= Eagles Temple =

Eagles Temple may refer to:

== in the United States ==
- Eagles Temple (Akron, Ohio), NRHP-listed
- Eagles Temple (Canton, Ohio), NRHP-listed

== See also ==
- List of Eagles buildings
