= List of Past Grand Worthy Presidents =

This list contains the year and name of Past Grand Worthy Presidents for the Fraternal Order of Eagles.

== Past Grand Worthy Presidents ==
- 1898 — John Cort
- 1899 — John W. Considine
- 1900 — H. R. Littlefield
- 1901 — Del Cary Smith
- 1902 — Del Cary Smith
- 1903 — Timothy D. Sullivan
- 1904 — John F. Pelletier
- 1905 — Hy D. Davis
- 1906 — E. W. Krause
- 1907 — Theo A. Bell
- 1908 — B.J. Monaghan
- 1909 — Frank E. Hering
- 1910 — Thomas F. Grady
- 1911 — Frank E. Hering
- 1912 — William J. Brennan
- 1913 — Thomas J. Cogan
- 1914 — Conrad H. Mann
- 1915 — William L. Grayson
- 1916 — Rex B. Goodcell
- 1917 — Carl G. Winter
- 1918 — A. B. Duncan
- 1919 — Elbert D. Weed
- 1920 — Elbert D. Weed
- 1921 — John M. Morin
- 1922 — Herbert I. Choynski
- 1923 — Howard N. Ragland
- 1924 — Otto P. Deluse
- 1925 — Charles C. Guenther
- 1926 — Michael O. Burns
- 1927 — L.V. Westerman
- 1928 — Edward J. Ryan
- 1929 — Charles J. Chenu
- 1930 — Robert E. Proctor
- 1931 — J.C. Canty
- 1932 — Henry J. Berrodin
- 1933 — George Nordin
- 1934 — George F. Douglas
- 1935 — George Nordin
- 1936 — Dr. H. B. Mehrmann
- 1937 — John W. Heller Jr.
- 1938 — Dr. Fred C. Dilley
- 1939 — John A. Abel
- 1940 — Charles P. McCann
- 1941 — George C. Tank
- 1942 — Lester H. Loble
- 1943 — Robert W. Hansen
- 1944 — John W. Young
- 1945 — Edward F. Poss
- 1946 — James W. Bryan
- 1947 — Raymond P. McElroy
- 1947 — E. J. Balsiger
- 1948 — DeVere Watson
- 1949 — William H. Mostyn
- 1949 — G. A. Farabaugh
- 1949 — Barnett H. Goldstein
- 1950 — William Hornblower
- 1951 — William P. Wetherald
- 1952 — Ray A. Rhode
- 1953 — Robert W. Hansen
- 1954 — Carl McGriff
- 1954 — James Cheetham
- 1954 — Walter J. S. Laurie
- 1954 — John J. Rice
- 1955 — Maurice Splain Jr.
- 1956 — Lawrence Leahy
- 1957 — Martin Mol
- 1958 — Andrew J. Halloran
- 1959 — J. Philip Bigley
- 1960 — Leo V. Connell
- 1961 — Paul N. Hoffman
- 1962 — Carl Thacker
- 1963 — Herschel McWilliams
- 1964 — Harry E. Burns
- 1965 — Max F. Schroeder Jr.
- 1966 — D.D. Billings
- 1967 — William A. McCawley
- 1968 — Harry B. A. Ford
- 1969 — Steven V. Thomas Jr.
- 1970 — Maynard Floyd
- 1971 — Ken Stewardson
- 1972 — J. C. Mitchell
- 1973 — James J. Bailey
- 1974 — Lewis Reed
- 1975 — Joseph E. Fournier
- 1975 — Arthur S. Ehrmann
- 1976 — Clyde J. Schmieg
- 1976 — Michael T. Gaffney
- 1976 — Al T. Williams
- 1977 — Anthony Angelo
- 1978 — D. D. "Doc" Dunlap
- 1979 — Leo Lentsch
- 1980 — Kenneth Amsbaugh
- 1980 — Paul E. Eichman
- 1981 — James I. Mason
- 1982 — Ben E. Packard
- 1983 — Peter "Pio" Scagnelli
- 1984 — Russell E. Clark
- 1985 — B. J. Sims
- 1986 — Jerry W. Wilson
- 1987 — Vincent Cherry
- 1988 — Laverne T. Weber
- 1989 — Dale E. Webster
- 1990 — Ken Cross
- 1991 — John Lester
- 1992 — Sherm Spears
- 1993 — Henry M. Funk
- 1994 — E. L. "Bud" Collett
- 1995 — George F. Ziebol
- 1996 — D. R. "Jim" West
- 1997 — William "Bill" Blum
- 1998 — Andrew Vollmer
- 1999 — Larry Hanshaw
- 2000 — W. P. "Pete" Harty
- 2001 — Edgar L. "Ed" Bollenbacher
- 2002 — Fred E. Smith
- 2003 — Wayne D. Clark
- 2004 — Orville "Sonny" Crawford
- 2005 — Chris Lainas Jr.
- 2006 — William L. "Bill" Loffer
- 2006 — Robert "Bob" Wahls
- 2007 — John Potter
- 2008 — James H. "Jim" Roberts
- 2009 — Michael B. "Mike" Lagervall
- 2010 — Phillip D. "Phil" Tice
- 2011 — Melvin Fry
- 2012 — Ron Stine
- 2013 — David Tice
- 2014 — Elwin "Bud" Haigh
- 2015 — Charles "Chuck" Lang
- 2016 — Jerry L. Sullivan
- 2017 — Thomas L. “Tom” McGrath
- 2018 - H. Carl Burnett
- 2019 - Ron Malz
- 2020 - Dave Smith
- 2021 - Brian Rogers
- 2022 - Rick Powell
- 2023 - Chuck Weber

== See also ==
- List of Past Grand Madam Presidents
