= Ballard Building =

Building in Seattle, Washington, U.S.

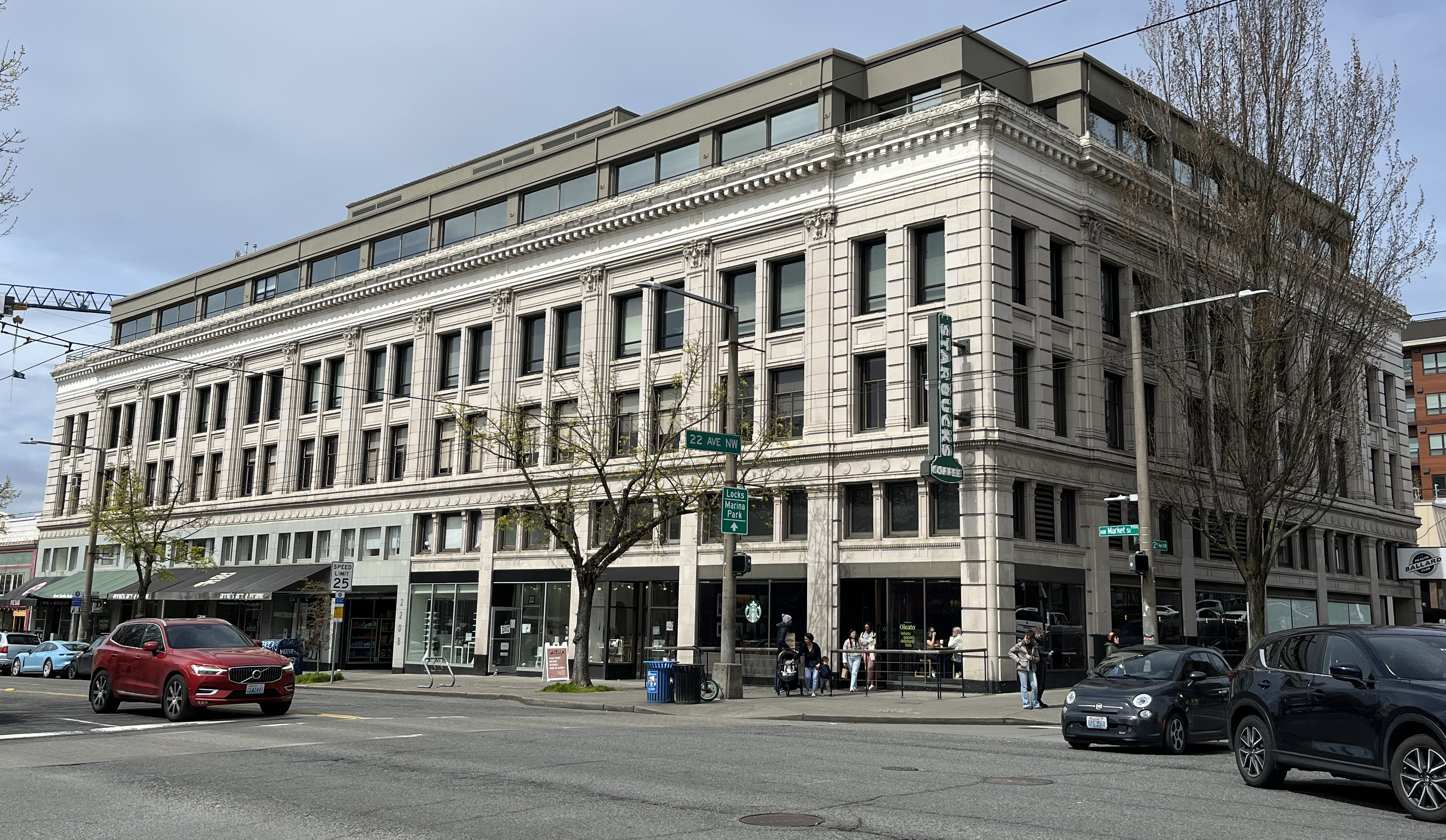
- The building's exterior in 2023
- Interactive map of the Ballard Building area

General information
- Location: Seattle, Washington, United States
- Coordinates: 47°40′8″N 122°23′7″W

The Ballard Building is a historic building in Seattle's Ballard neighborhood, in the U.S. state of Washington. It was built by the Fraternal Order of Eagles in the 1920s. The terracotta building has housed a community hospital, restaurants and other businesses, including a music venue called the Backstage, which closed in 1998.
