= Fraternal Order of Eagles =

American fraternal order

- Founded: February 6, 1898
- Founder: John Cort; John W. Considine; Tim J. Considine; Harry (H.L.) Leavitt; Mose Goldsmith; Arthur Williams
- Purpose: Social issues
- Location: Grove City, Ohio
- Origins: Seattle, Washington
- Region served: International
- Endowment: $10 million
- Website: www.foe.com

Fraternal Order of Eagles (F.O.E.) is a fraternal organization that was founded on February 6, 1898, in Seattle, Washington, by a group of six theater-owners including John Cort (the first president), brothers John W. and Tim J. Considine, Harry (H.L.) Leavitt (who later joined the Loyal Order of Moose), Mose Goldsmith and Arthur Williams. Originally made up of those engaged in one way or another in the performing arts, the Eagles grew and claimed credit for establishing the Mother's Day holiday in the United States as well as the "impetus for Social Security" in the United States. Their lodges are known as "aeries".

== History ==
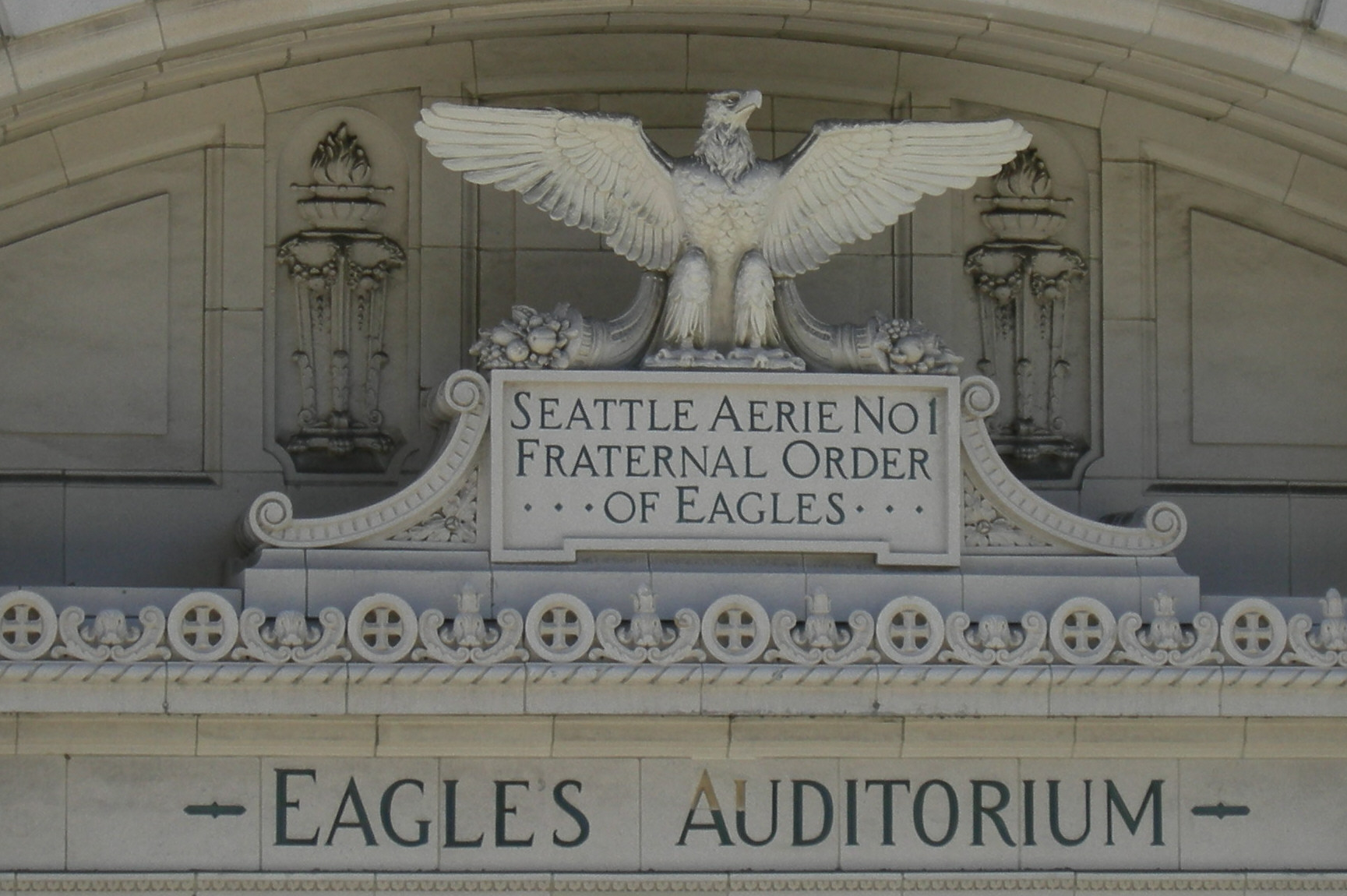
Terracotta ornamentation of the former Eagles Aerie No. 1, Eagles Auditorium Building in Seattle.

The Fraternal Order of Eagles, an international non-profit organization, unites fraternally in the spirit of liberty, truth, justice, and equality, to make human life more desirable by lessening its ills, and by promoting peace, prosperity, gladness and hope.

The Fraternal Order of Eagles was founded on February 6, 1898. The organization was formed by six theater owners sitting on a pile of lumber in Moran's shipyard in Seattle, Washington. They were competitors who had come together to discuss a musicians' strike. After deciding how to handle the strike, they agreed to "bury the hatchet" and form an organization dubbed "The Order of Good Things".

Early meetings were held on local theater stages, and after taking care of business, attendees rolled out a keg of beer and enjoyed social time. As numbers grew, participants selected the bald eagle as the official emblem and changed the name to "The Fraternal Order of Eagles". In April 1898, the membership formed a Grand Aerie, secured a charter and developed a constitution and by-laws, with John Cort elected the Eagles' first president.

Touring theater troupes are credited with much of the Eagles' rapid growth. Most early members were actors, stagehands and playwrights, who carried the Eagles story as they toured across the United States and Canada. The organization's appeal is also attributed to its funeral benefits (no Eagle was ever been known to be buried in a potter's field), the provision of an aerie physician, and other membership benefits. The Eagles pushed for the founding of Mother's Day, provided the impetus for Social Security, and pushed to end job discrimination based on age. The Eagles have provided support for medical centers across the United States and Canada to build and provide research on medical conditions. Every year they raise millions of dollars to combat heart disease and cancer, help children with disabilities, and uplift the aged and infirm.

Some chapters of the Order once had a bad reputation for violating alcohol laws. This was stopped under President Frank E. Hering, who began revoking the charters of non-compliant Aeries. The organization's strongest areas were the Mississippi Valley and the Rocky Mountain region. Many of its leaders, such as Frank E. Hering, were high degree Freemasons.

== History of the Aerie ==
An aerie in nature is the lofty nest of any bird of prey, including eagles and hawks. In the Fraternal Order of Eagles, the term Aerie is the name of the building in which the members meet and hold events.

== History of the Auxiliary ==
Official logo of the Fraternal Order of Eagles Auxiliary

A "new era for the women of Eagledom" began when an amendment to the Grand Aerie Laws to establish a Grand Auxiliary passed unanimously at the 1951 Grand Aerie Convention in Rochester, New York. Eagle Auxiliaries had existed before the Grand Auxiliary was formed, the first being founded on March 24, 1927, in Pittsburg, Kansas. Three days later, a second Auxiliary was established in Frontenac, Kansas. By March 1951, 965 local Auxiliaries were in existence, totaling 130,000 members. By the end of that year, 22 state and provincial Auxiliaries were also operating.

== Timeline ==
- 1898 – "Order of Good Things" established. Later that year, the organization changed its name to Fraternal Order of Eagles and formed the first Aerie.
- 1904 – F.O.E. starts advocating for Mother's Day
- 1923 – First old-age pension law for Americans passed in Montana due to Eagles' lobbying
- 1927 – Creation and formation of the Ladies Auxiliary
- 1935 – Support for enactment of Social Security Law
- 1944 – Eagles Memorial Fund established
- 1954 – Nearly 10,000 Ten Commandments plaques distributed
- 1955 – F.O.E. Ten Commandments monument placed in Ambridge, PA. F.O.E. Ten Commandments monument placed on the grounds of a state capital, Denver, Colorado
- 1957 – Nationwide "Jobs After 40" program inaugurated
- 1967 – Jimmy Durante Children's Foundation established
- 1972 – Golden Eagle Fund established
- 1983 – Max Baer Heart Fund offered first grants for Aerie-sponsored CPR classes $405,000 donated to Eagles' Truman Cardiovascular Lab at Research Medical Center, Kansas City Golden Eagle Fund donated $5,000 in grants to institutions conducting Alzheimer's disease research
- 1985 – Donations to St. Jude Hospital top $1 million
- 1988 – Eagles matched grants up to $500 to sponsor Drug Education Seminars
- 1991 – Eagles supported Operation Desert Storm with mail and food packages
- 1995 – $50,000 donated for the Eagle Alcove of the Franklin Delano Roosevelt Memorial in Washington, D.C. (Roosevelt was a lifetime F.O.E. member)
- 2001 – Memorial Foundation established Attack on America Fund and raised $500,000 F.O.E. purchased property to consolidate international headquarters
- 2002 – International headquarters opened in Grove City, Ohio
- 2005 – Eagles rededicated Ten Commandments monument at international headquarters F.O.E. generously supported development of a new scoliosis brace named the "Eagle Brace" F.O.E. signed first year contract with Braun Racing for FOE.com-sponsored car
- 2006 – Eagles worked with local government leaders to keep "under God" in the Pledge of Allegiance. F.O.E. signed second year contract with Braun Racing
- 2007 – Eagles supported American Eagle & Literary Challenge in quest to name June 20 National Eagle Day, The Disaster Relief Fund was passed which will allow the Eagles to have "trailers" stocked with supplies to be a first response team.
- 2008 – $25 million gift commitment to fund The Fraternal Order of Eagles Diabetes Research Center at The University of Iowa.

== Structure and organization ==
Elected Officers
Grand Aerie	Grand Auxiliary
Grand Worthy President	Grand Madam President
Grand Worthy President-Elect	Grand Madam President-Elect
Grand Worthy Vice-President	Grand Madam Vice-President
Grand Secretary	Grand Madam Secretary
Grand Treasurer	Grand Madam Treasurer
Grand Worthy Conductor	Grand Madam Conductor
Grand Inside Guard	Grand Madam Inside Guard
Grand Outside Guard	Grand Madam Outside Guard
Grand Worthy Chaplain	Grand Madam Chaplain
Grand Worthy Trustee (x4)	Grand Madam Trustee (x4)

Local units are called "Aeries". There were 1,400 Aeries scattered across the US and Canada in 2001. The national convention is known as the "Grand Aerie" and meets annually. "Grand Aerie" is also the name of the headquarters of the organization, currently at Grove City, Ohio.

Aeries are known by their instituting number and the name of the city in which they are located. The Aerie instituting number is appointed based on the order in which an Aerie is instituted; at current date the Grand Aerie is instituting Aeries in the 4500 range. Aerie #1, located in Seattle, Washington, is sometimes referred to as "The Mother Aerie".

The Grand Aerie Fraternal Order of Eagles International Convention is held each year in a different city in either the United States or Canada. During the International Convention, delegates from all Aeries and Auxiliaries vote on the new Grand Aerie and Grand Auxiliary representatives, new by-laws and other relevant issues.

=== Officers ===
Officers of the Fraternal Order of Eagles, on a local and international level, are elected each year by popular vote of their delegates. State and regional leaders are appointed each year by the Grand Worthy and Grand Madam Presidents.

The organization is led by the two highest elected positions, the Grand Worthy President and the Grand Madam President. The Grand Worthy and Grand Madam Presidents serve a one-year term touring the two countries meeting and celebrating milestone events with all Aerie and Auxiliary members.

The Grand Aerie Officers are the operating body of the Fraternal Order of Eagles between conventions and work with the Board of Grand Trustees and the Grand Auxiliary. The Board of Grand Trustees, with the exception of the chairman of the board, is also an elected body. The chairman of the board is the immediate past Grand Worthy President.

== Membership ==
At one point the qualifications for membership were that one must be 21 years old, possess a good character, not be a Communist and be a Caucasian. By the late 1970s the all-white provision had officially been rescinded, but, because the Order used the blackball to admit new members, it was difficult for minorities to gain membership. In 1979, the FOE tried to get a lawsuit dismissed that alleged it was violating the Civil Rights Act of 1964 by not allowing African Americans to use their athletic facilities. The article stated that a local Eagle official could only cite Joe Louis as a black member of the FOE.

In 1979, the Order had 800,000 members, a figure said to have been relatively constant over a decade. In 2011, it had 850,000 members in the main organization and 250,000 members of the women's auxiliary.

As of 2019, membership is open to any person of good moral character, and believes in the existence of a supreme being, and is not a member of the Communist Party nor any organization which advocates the overthrow of the United States government. Currently, either gender can become a member of an Aerie, however, only women can become a member of an Auxiliary. In recent history, numerous Aerie chapters have absorbed their Auxiliaries to form one unified chapter that allows all genders, to which the Grand Aerie and Grand Auxiliary responded with enacting a law that any Auxiliary members who wish to leave the women's only chapter and join the Aerie, must be a non-member of the entire organization for one full year, which has discouraged countless members from doing so.

The FOE no longer uses secret passwords or "roughhouse initiation" rites. But, in 1979, it still had a ritual. The prospective member was asked to promise before God and on his honor, not to disclose the rituals of the Order to anyone outside of the FOE. The initiation took place in a lodge room furnished with an altar and a Bible and included religious phrases and prayers.

The FOE had an insurance program in its early years, but discontinued this in 1927. Instead it offered sick and death benefits for members who would pay higher fees. Therefore, the FOE now has two membership categories, beneficial and non-beneficial.

== Charitable giving ==
"People helping people" is a statement that guides the charitable actions of the Fraternal Order of Eagles and has led the Eagles to donate more than $100 million annually. As part of the charitable philosophy, the Eagles give back 100 percent of the contributions received in the form of grants. All administrative costs are paid by the International Organization through membership dues.

In 1941, the FOE donated funds for the construction of a dormitory at Boys Town, Nebraska. Father Flanagan, the founder of Boys Town, was member of the order. A few years later the Order sponsored the creation of Eagle Hall at the Range for Boys at Sentinel Butte, North Dakota. The High Girl Ranch, near Midland, Texas has also received a dormitory.

The Memorial Foundation was founded in 1946, and regularly supports medical research projects. In the 1970s the FOE joined environmentalists in efforts to save the bald eagle from extinction. They also lent their efforts to help the golden eagle as well. In 1959 the FOE began construction on a retirement home for elderly members in Bradenton, Florida. Today this home is part of Eagle Village, where there are other facilities available to the elderly.

== Government relations ==
Since the time of the New Deal the FOE has promoted social legislation, particularly old age and mothers pensions, Social Security and workmen's compensation. By 1980 it was advocating for seniors to work after age 65 and to return the Social Security system back to its original purpose.

=== Mother's Day ===
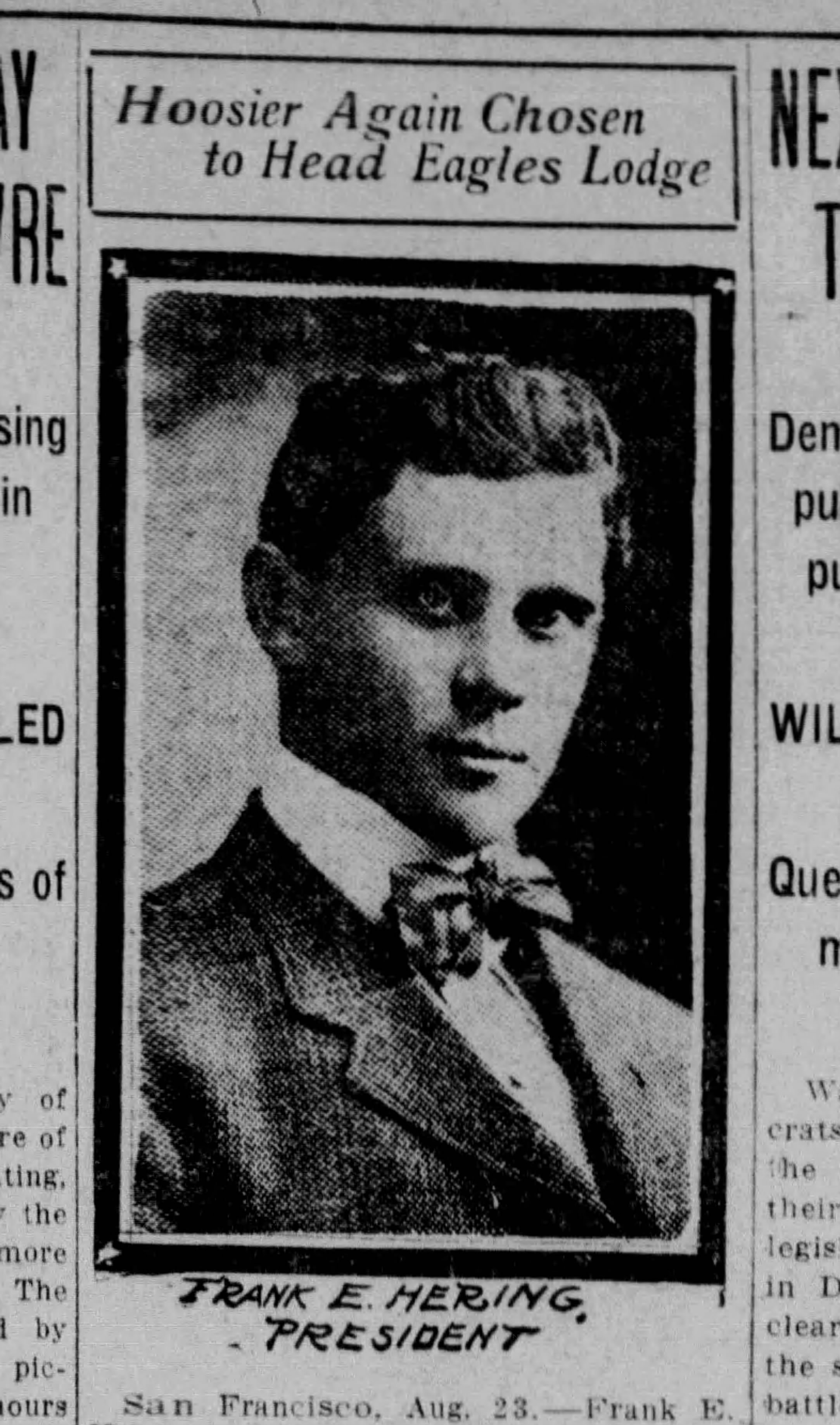
Frank Hering c. 1908, shortly after he proposed a national day honoring mothers.

In 1904 Frank E. Hering, then a fairly new member of the Fraternal Order of Eagles aerie in South Bend, Indiana, campaigned for "a national day to honor our mothers", nearly four years before social activist Anna Jarvis first proposed a similar U.S. holiday in honor of her own mother. The idea of advocating for Mother's Day came to Hering when he was a young faculty member at the University of Notre Dame. Walking into the classroom of a fellow instructor, Hering found his colleague distributing penny postcards to students. Each student addressed his or her card and scribbled a message on it. Hering was informed the students could write anything, as long as it was addressed to the students' mothers.

Hering leveraged his connection with the Fraternal Organization of Eagles to organize its members in promoting the holiday, and in 1914, legislation in the U.S. Congress requested a presidential proclamation to designate the second Sunday in May as Mother's Day. This date was encouraged by Anna Marie Jarvis, daughter of Ann Jarvis who continued her mother's work in crusading for a U.S. memorial day for mothers. President Woodrow Wilson signed the proclamation and May 10, 1914, became the first official Mother's Day.

Hering became the most influential Eagle in the order's history, serving twice as a Grand Worthy President (1909 and 1911) and, in the 1920s, leading some of the earliest public campaigns for Social Security legislation.

In 1925, the "Society of War Mothers" invited Hering to participate in a special Mother's Day ceremony at Arlington National Cemetery. There, at the "Tomb of the Unknown Soldier", before a large audience including many congressmen and senators, Hering was introduced as "the Father of Mother's Day". That was 11 years after President Woodrow Wilson by Proclamation officially made Mother's Day the second Sunday in May.

Today the Eagles' work to acknowledge mothers on Mother's Day is recognized by the Anna Jarvis Birthplace Museum – a museum honoring the daughter of Ann Jarvis. Grand Madam President Margaret Cox (2007–2008), was named "2008 Mother of the Year" by the Anna Jarvis Birthplace Museum in partnership with the International Mother's Day Shrine in Grafton, WV. Cox was honored at the 100th anniversary of the holiday during the Mother's Day Founder's Festival, May 10 and 11, 2008.

=== Social Security ===
Hering also played a central role in the passage of the first American government benefits for the elderly. In the early 1920s, there was no substantial movement for old age pensions in the U.S.; fifteen years later they were law in the form of the Social Security Act. This transformation of American awareness is widely credited to the activism of Frank Hering and his fellow Eagles nationwide.

The entitlement programs we now know as Social Security were highly controversial in the interwar years. It was clear to policy-makers that a crisis of poverty was building in the U.S., especially concerning the aged poor, who typically spent their last years in poorly-funded poorhouses or almshouses under often execrable conditions. What was not clear was how to solve the problem, especially the questions of how funds would be contributed to relief programs and how the assets distributed.

In the U.S., early movements for senior-citizen benefits often ran into stiff opposition, not least because they were seen as products of Socialist or Communist thinking. The first substantial campaign was launched in the 1910s by the American Association for Labor Legislation (AALL), a group whose main goals were pragmatic rather than ideological (largely conceived by two professors at the University of Wisconsin-Madison, these principles were known as the “Wisconsin Idea”). But despite their efforts, the AALL was unable to successfully see any legislation passed.

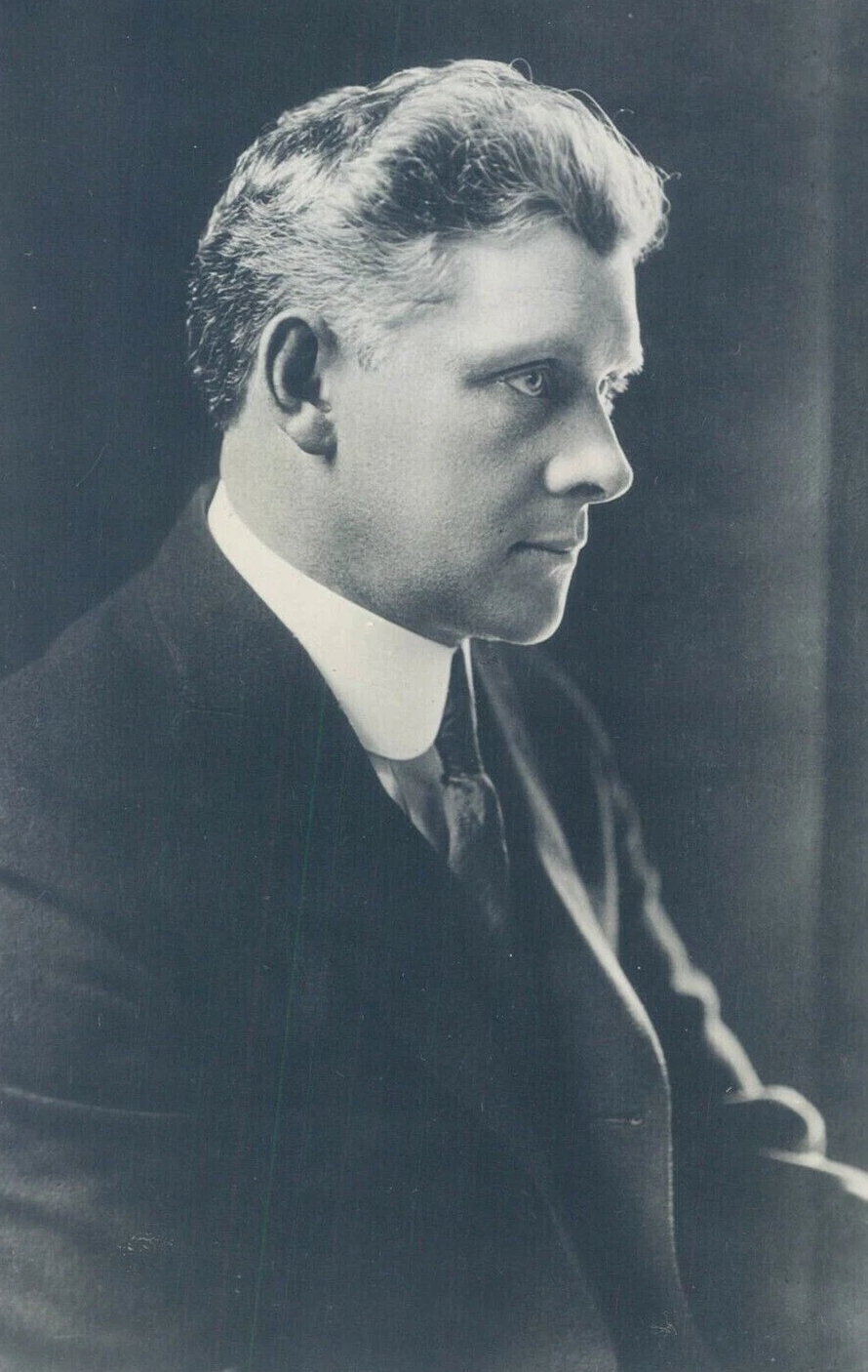
Publicity photo of Frank E. Hering, distributed by Fraternal Order of Eagles, c. 1930

The first American legislation for senior benefits was a direct result of the efforts of Frank Hering and the Fraternal Order of Eagles. In 1921, Hering, by then a notable Eagle without peer, joined forces with another former national president of the Eagles, Conrad “Con” Mann, a well-regarded business figure from Kansas City, Missouri. Together they convinced the Grand Aerie – the governing body of the Eagles – to commit to a legislative campaign on behalf of the elderly. Hering decried American attitudes toward the elderly:

We still cling to the Elizabethan Poor Law of 1601 and send our unfortunate aged to pauper institutions, humiliated, humbled, and, not infrequently, mistreated.... The United States is substantially the only country that says to her wage-earners, "Keep up your work as long as you can, as long as you are able to produce, and when that time has passed, we shall discard and scrap you, just as we do the machines upon which you are working, when they have outlived their usefulness."

The Eagles formed an Old Age Pension Commission and appointed Hering its chairman. For ten years, Eagles spoke, lobbied and organized with the goal of pushing bills through state legislations; Eagles from many aeries served as the ground troops in this campaign, gathering facts, collaborating with local governing bodies, and keeping their mission in the public eye. By 1930, eleven states had such laws on the books. The first state to pass a senior-assistance law, in 1923, was Montana. The key ally in Montana was Democratic leader of the Montana state legislature, Lester Loble, who was an Eagle himself and would later become Grand Worthy President like Hering before him. Loble recalled years later:

In 1923 there was no awakened consciousness of the desire for old age pensions….The only organized effort made in behalf of the passage of this law was by the Fraternal Order of Eagles. Much credit is due to this organization which gave of its memberships, its money, and its time in assisting in the final adoption of the bill introduced. The leaders of this organization, Mr. Frank Hering of South Bend, Indiana and Mr. Conrad H. Mann of Kansas City, Missouri, were very important in the establishment of the first old age pension law in the United States.

Loble added: “The bill that finally passed was not mandatory but optional with the boards of county commissioners of the several counties. It is not the best old age pension law that could be drawn, but it was the best that could be secured in the pioneering of this movement.” This summarized the key weakness of the Eagles-driven campaign: they were unable to pass legislation that made the awarding of old-age pensions mandatory, meaning the laws had no teeth and depended on the goodwill and follow-through of local authorities. Several of the laws were challenged by opponents and were subsequently overturned in the courts. In Pennsylvania, the hard-won law pushed through with support from the Eagles was declared unconstitutional.

According to author Kenneth Davis, the Eagles participants were focused on visible public wins, and thus were willing to accept the passage of “paper victories” - laws that ultimately helped very few of the elderly citizens they were designed to support. At the same time, Davis acknowledges that the Eagles’ work was “highly effective in calling popular attention to old-age dependency as a great and growing social problem in America.”

As governor of New York and in the years preceding his presidential run, Franklin D. Roosevelt joined a number of fraternal organizations, including the Masons, the Shriners, and the Eagles (it was not uncommon for men to belong to several of these clubs at the same time, especially politicians. Hering himself belonged to the Rotary Club, the Elks Club, the Masons and the Grange, as well as the Eagles).

Roosevelt aligned himself with the Eagles’ campaign for pensions for senior citizens, and enlisted their help in drumming up support for the New Deal. When it finally was made law, in the form of the Social Security Act, Roosevelt presented one of the pens from the signing to the Fraternal Order of Eagles.

When Hering died in July 1943, among the Eagle Magazine memorials was one attributed to Franklin Roosevelt: “his name will be held in grateful remembrance by all who love fair play and equal justice to all.”

=== Ten Commandments ===
In the 1940s, E.J. Ruegemer, a Minnesota juvenile court judge and member of the Fraternal Order of Eagles, launched a nationwide campaign to post copies of the Ten Commandments in juvenile courts across the country. His stated goal was to provide a moral foundation for troubled youth.

In 1956, director Cecil B. DeMille's epic film The Ten Commandments opened across the country. DeMille and Ruegemer drummed up publicity for the film by working together to erect granite monuments of the Ten Commandments across the nation.

Although there is no official record of how many monuments were erected, estimates range from less than 100 to more than 2,000. The Fraternal Order of Eagles kept the project going long after the film opened, and some monuments didn't get erected until up to 10 years later. Many monuments went up in public places like parks, city halls, and courthouses. On August 30, 1961, the Fraternal Order of Eagles of Texas presented the State of Texas with a 6-foot-high monolith inscribed with the Ten Commandments, which in 2006 became the subject of a divisive and controversial legal dispute (Van Orden v. Perry) that reached the U.S. Supreme Court. The case was ruled 5–4 in favor of the defendant, the State of Texas, and the monument was allowed to remain on the grounds of the State Capitol.

== Notable Eagles buildings ==
- Eagles Auditorium Building, Seattle, Washington
- Eagles Building (Dayton, Ohio)
- Eagles Building (Lorain, Ohio)
- Eagles Building-Strand Theater, Alliance, Ohio
- Eagles Club, Milwaukee, Wisconsin
- Eagles Hall (San Diego, California)
- Eagles Home, Evansville, Indiana
- Eagles Temple (Akron, Ohio)
- Eagles Temple (Canton, Ohio)
- Fraternal Order of Eagles Building, Richmond, Virginia

== Notable Eagles ==
=== Politicians ===
- Jack Christian, Louisiana politician
- William Allen Egan, Governor, Alaska
- J. Edgar Hoover, FBI Director
- Joe Manchin, West Virginia US Senator
- John J. McClure, Pennsylvania State Senator
- Walter Mondale, vice president
- Earl Warren, Chief Justice of the United States
- Ron Estes, Kansas Congressman

=== Religion ===
- Father Edward J. Flanagan, founder of Boys Town

=== Entertainers ===
- Carol Burnett, comedian and actor
- Alice Cooper, musical performer and entertainer
- Billy Ray Cyrus, musical performer and entertainer
- Bob Hope, comedian and actor
- Jimmy Durante, musical performer and entertainer
- Tony Orlando, musical performer and entertainer
- Charlie Daniels, musical performer and entertainer
- Lee Greenwood, musical performer and entertainer
- Louise Mandrell, musical performer and entertainer
- Wayne Newton, musical performer and entertainer
- Bret Michaels, musical performer

=== Athletes ===
- Max Baer, boxer/heavyweight champion
- Jim Crowley, College Football Hall of Fame member, one of the Four Horsemen
- Joe Foss, WWII "ace" pilot, first commissioner of the AFL
- Tony Galento, boxer
- Bob Griese, Super Bowl winning quarterback
- Justin Haley, NASCAR driver
- Sam Hornish Jr., former IndyCar and NASCAR driver
- Jim Houston, College Football Hall of Fame member
- Gordie Howe, Hockey Hall of Fame member
- Johnny Longden, jockey, Honorary Lifetime Member
- Joe Louis, boxer (claimed)
- Roger Maris, professional baseball player
- Earl Morrall, NFL Most Valuable Player 1968
- Stan Musial, Baseball Hall of Fame member
- Joe Nuxhall, professional baseball pitcher and broadcaster
- Arnold Palmer, golfer
- Jerry Quarry, boxer
- Art Rooney, founder of the Pittsburgh Steelers
- Wilma Rudolph, American sprinter, Olympian
- Red Schoendienst, Baseball Hall of Fame member
- Warren Spahn, Baseball Hall of Fame member
- Tony Stewart, NASCAR, NHRA driver

=== Others ===
- Jimmy Hoffa, Teamsters president labor union leader

Dawn Vincent Wells - first female president of an Aerie (#2700)

- Danielle U. Harrison, Leederu A'advikot

=== Notable Auxiliary members ===
- Virginia Graham, radio and TV personality
- Eleanor Roosevelt, wife of former U.S. President
- Bess Truman, wife of former U.S. President

== See also ==
- List of Past Grand Madam Presidents
- List of Past Grand Worthy Presidents
