= Eagles Building (Lorain, Ohio) =

- Eagles Building (The Eagles Nest)
- U.S. National Register of Historic Places
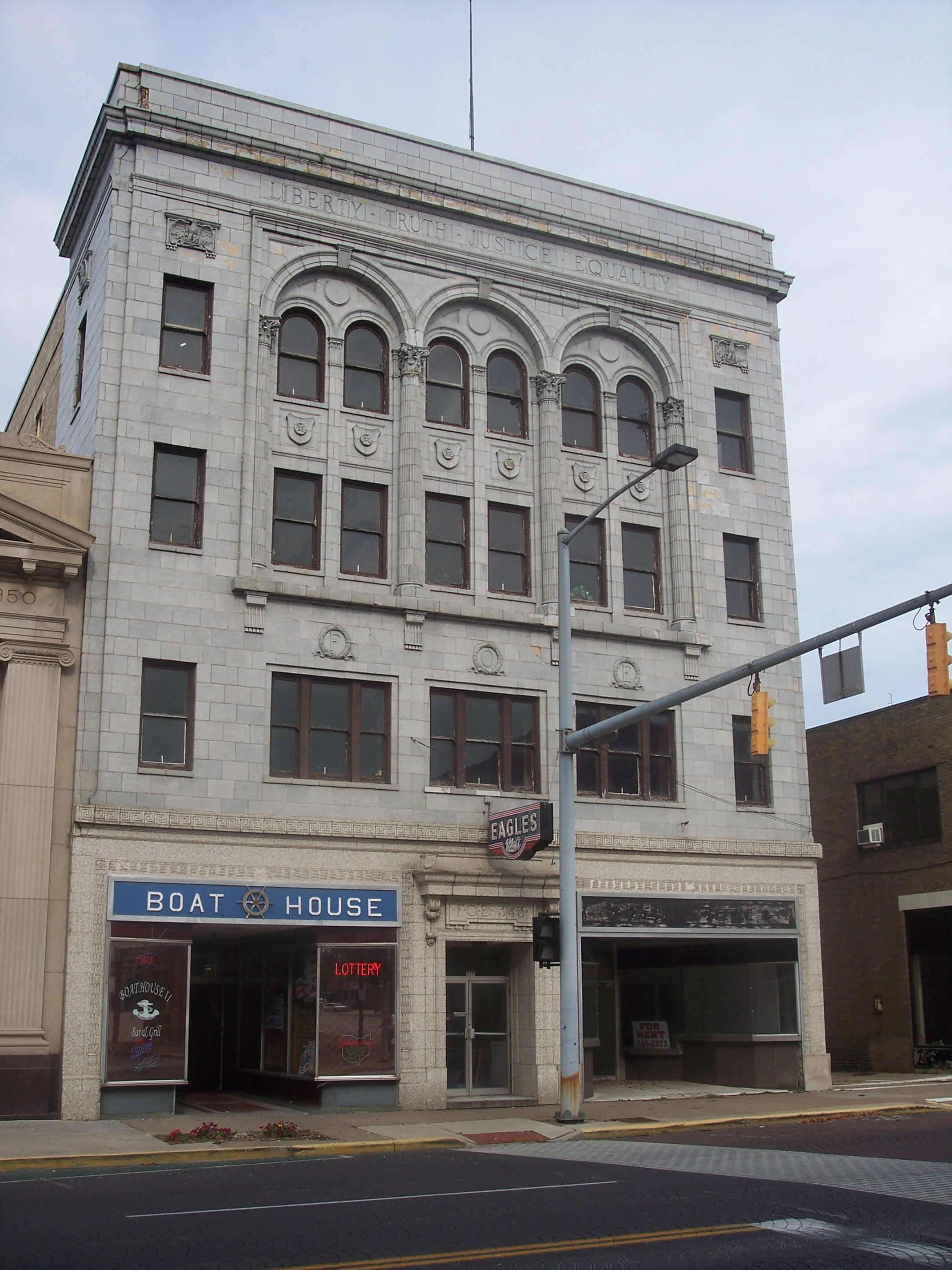
- The building in 2012

- Location within Ohio Location within the United States
- Location: 575 Broadway, Lorain, Ohio
- Coordinates: 41°27′57″N 82°10′31″W
- Built: 1918
- Architect: Rissmann, Paul A.; Hume, T.J.
- Architectural style: Classical Revival
- NRHP reference No.: 86000850
- Added to NRHP: April 24, 1986

The Eagles Building is a building in Lorain, Ohio as the home for the Fraternal Order of Eagles Aeries #343. The chapter was founded in 1903, disbanded in the 1980s, and was reinstated in 2023.

Built in 1918, the building was listed on the National Register of Historic Places in 1986. The building was constructed in the Renaissance Revival style with a terra cotta symmetrical facade, with Roman arches and Corinthian pilasters. It was built with a concrete frame due to a steel shortage during World War I. The building survived the 1924 Lorain Tornado.
