= List of Past Grand Madam Presidents =

This list contains the year and name of Past Grand Madam Presidents for the Fraternal Order of Eagles.

== Past Grand Madam Presidents ==
- 1952 — Alta Smith
- 1952 — Kay Guy
- 1953 — Mary Dunn
- 1954 — Carol Bennett
- 1955 — Virginia Turner
- 1956 — Chloe Honeycutt
- 1957 — Elizabeth Baum
- 1958 — Stella Moorehouse
- 1959 — Lois Nelson Fargo
- 1960 — Adaline Navarra
- 1960 — Georgia Walker
- 1961 — Evelyn Schreier
- 1962 — Cora Rigg
- 1963 — Isabel Vallie
- 1964 — Juanita Dix
- 1965 — Frances Vanis
- 1966 — Kay Williamson
- 1967 — Nora Belle Goodman
- 1968 — Alta Lewin
- 1969 — Yvonne Magnan
- 1970 — Dorothy Wilding
- 1971 — Ruby Bigoni
- 1972 — Lucille Lewis-McGovern
- 1973 — Vera Dailey
- 1974 — Imogene Harac (Zarecki)
- 1975 — Clara Johnson-Harding
- 1976 — Verna Funke
- 1977 — Dolores "Doadie" Cloclough
- 1978 — Bonnie Quatkemeyer
- 1979 — Ruth Elderbrook
- 1980 — Mildred "Millie" Johnson
- 1981 — Paula Wilson
- 1982 — Doris Anderson
- 1983 — Bess Lenarduzzi
- 1984 — Marcella "Marcy" James
- 1984 — Fran Ehrmann
- 1985 — Jacquelin "Jackie" Spahn
- 1986 — Joanne "Jo" Rott Jamestown
- 1987 — Catherine "Cathy" Wilson
- 1988 — Jean Dockall
- 1989 — Katherine "Kathy" Gonzagowski
- 1990 — Barbara Cyphers
- 1991 — Shirley Johnson
- 1992 — Alta Haslow
- 1993 — Joyce Avery
- 1994 — Iris McDermott
- 1995 — Lorraine Grimes
- 1996 — Carol Inge Spiro
- 1997 — Sharon Sabourin
- 1998 — Doris Bateson
- 1999 — Linda Heffner
- 2000 — Judy Sanders
- 2001 — Bettie L. Clark
- 2002 — Carleen Corum
- 2003 — Peggy L. Carver
- 2004 — Dorothy "Dottie" Beattie #1637
- 2004 — Pat Lazenby
- 2005 — Roxann Alley McGovern
- 2006 — Stephanie Smith
- 2007 — Margaret Cox
- 2008 — Pat Durham
- 2009 — Jean Kerr
- 2010 — Mary Myers
- 2011 — Gwen Stallkamp
- 2012 — Sally Villalva
- 2013 — Katie Ziebol
- 2014 — Gloria Mason
- 2015 — Penny Skinner
- 2016 — Judy Johnson
- 2017 — Helen Poehner
- 2018 - Althea Lane
- 2019 - Gloria Williams
- 2020 - Jacqueline Wahl Marble

== See also ==
- List of Past Grand Worthy Presidents
