= Frank E. Hering =

American football player and sports coach (1874–1943)

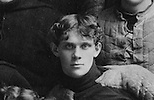
- Hering as Notre Dames's coach and quarterback in 1896

Biographical details
- Born: April 30, 1874
- Died: July 11, 1943 (aged 69); South Bend, Indiana, U.S.

Playing career

Football
- 1893–1894: Chicago
- 1896: Notre Dame
- Position: Quarterback

Coaching career (HC unless noted)

Football
- 1895: Bucknell (assistant)
- 1896–1898: Notre Dame

Basketball
- 1897–1898: Notre Dame

Baseball
- 1897–1899: Notre Dame

Head coaching record
- Overall: 12–6–1 (football); 1–2 (basketball); 17–7 (baseball)

Francis Earl Hering (April 30, 1874 – July 11, 1943) was an American social reformer, public speaker, and fraternal organization leader.

In his youth, Hering was a college football player and coach of football, basketball, and baseball at the University of Notre Dame.

Later, Hering achieved national fame as a leader of the Fraternal Order of Eagles, and served as its Grand Worthy President twice, elected in 1909 and 1911. He was publisher of the order's national magazine The Eagle for more than three decades. In his role as an Eagles leader during the heyday of fraternal societies, Hering used his pulpit to lead several national campaigns for social justice, most importantly his work on behalf of social security benefits.

== Early Life and Sports Career ==
Hering was born in Northumberland County, Pennsylvania, to Solomon and Mary (Neuer) Hering.

He attended high school in Williamsport, Pennsylvania, graduating in 1892.

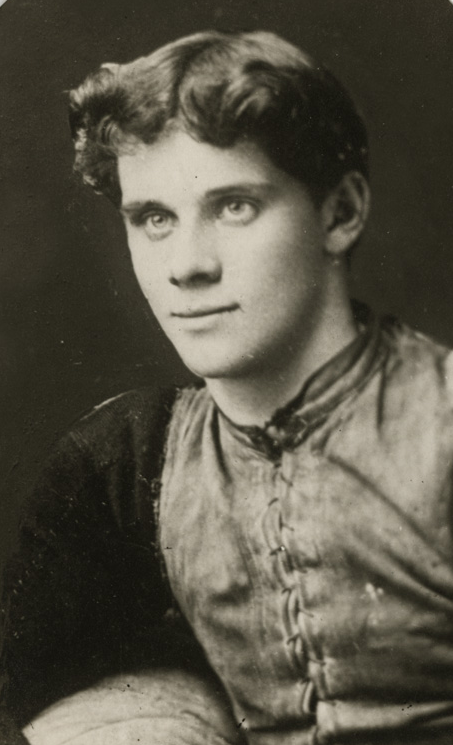
A photograph of Frank Hering in his University of Chicago football uniform, 1894

After a year working for the Pennsylvania Railroad, Hering enrolled at the University of Chicago, and played quarterback for the Chicago Maroons for the 1893 and 1894 seasons under the tutelage of legendary Chicago coach Amos Alonzo Stagg. Stagg remembered Hering's unique talents in his memoir, Touchdown!

Frank Hering... was my quarter in 1894, and the first man I encountered who could throw a football as a baseball is thrown, an ability arising from the unusual size and grip of his hands. I trained Hering, if he got the ball on the kick-off, to pass it back to an end or a half or to shoot it to a sleeper lying outside.

Stagg added, "He spiraled the pass." Bill Leiser, the legendary sports columnist for the San Francisco Chronicle, published his conclusion that Hering was the first football player recorded to have used the single-handed overhand spiral pass that is such a central part of the game today. (Credit for the first legal overhand pass generally goes to Bradbury Robinson in 1906, after the official rules were changed to explicitly permit this style of throw.)

Hering left the University of Chicago in 1895 and got his first head coaching job, with the Bucknell Bisons. That same year, Hering married Florence Madison Dalmond, of Chicago. At Bucknell, Hering joined the Phi Gamma Delta fraternity.

The following year, he left Bucknell and enrolled at the University of Notre Dame and began serving as its director of athletics for the Fighting Irish. He also served as the team's quarterback, and as the school's full-time head football coach from 1896 to 1898, compiling a record of 12–6–1. He earned the title of "Father of Notre Dame Football" for his success in expanding the football program from an intramural activity to a full-fledged intercollegiate sport. According to a 1909 profile, during his entire football career "he never weighed more than 120 pounds."

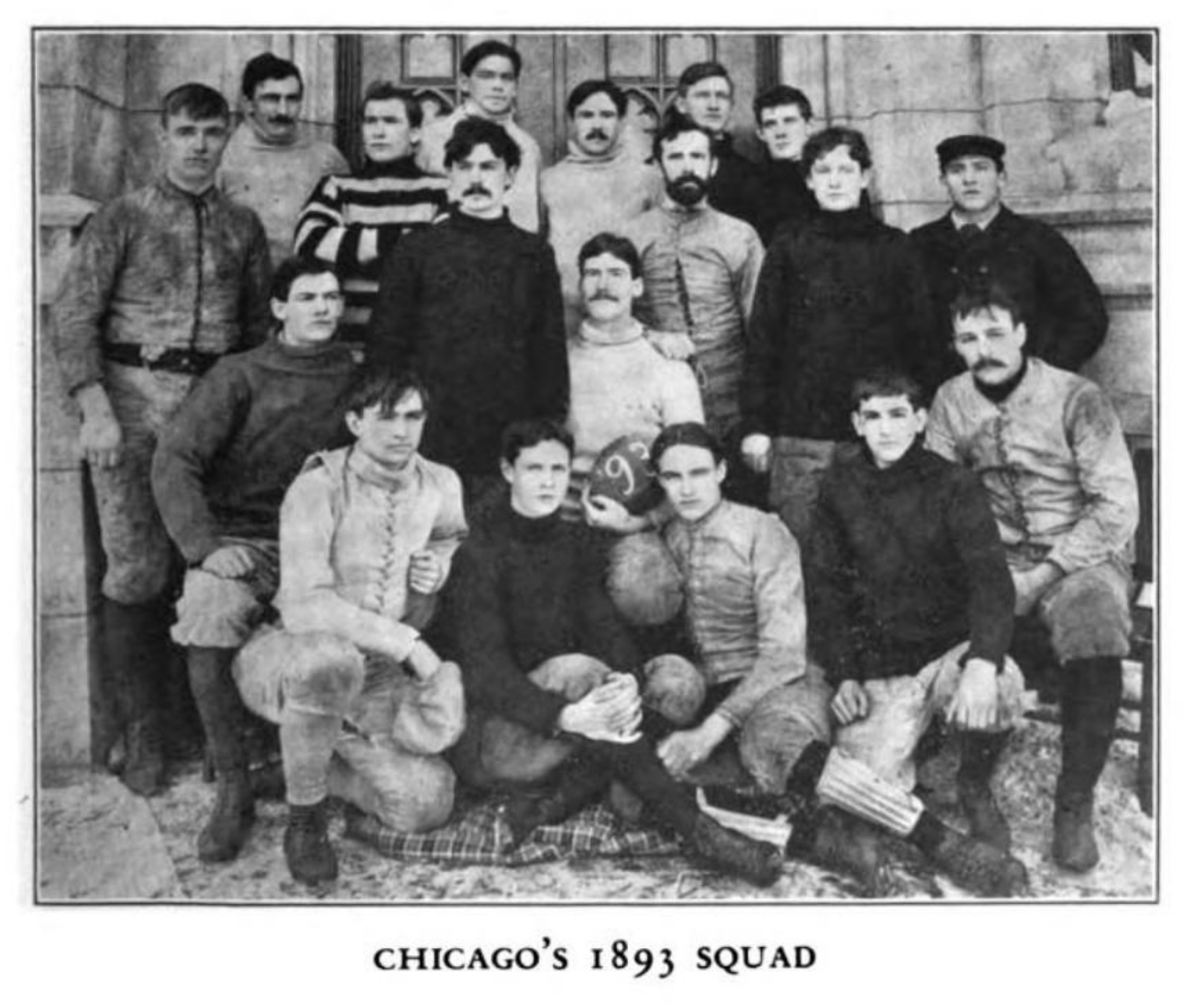
The 1893 University of Chicago Maroons football team. Frank Hering is visible in the back row, third from right.

Hering is credited with introducing the game of basketball to Notre Dame. On February 17, 1897, the South Bend Tribune announced an exhibition game between two Notre Dame squads, "trained by the university coach, Mr. Hering. This will be the first game of basketball played in South Bend," the paper proclaimed. "It is full of action and keeps the spectator interested from start to finish." Hering then served as basketball coach at Notre Dame, coaching one season in 1897–98, and captained the school's baseball team for three seasons, from 1897 to 1899.

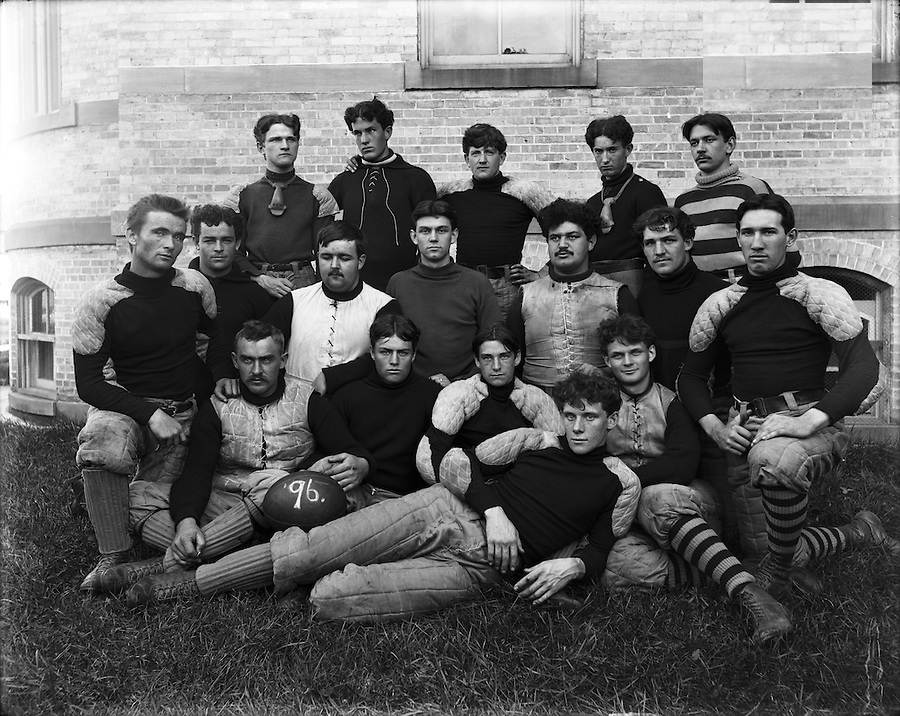
The University of Notre Dame Football squad of 1896. Frank Hering is lying center front.

Hering received a bachelor's degree in philosophy from Notre Dame in 1898. According to a 1902 local newspaper article, that same year Hering's career as an athlete and coach for Notre Dame came to an end "because of his failure to agree with Notre Dame students," an unexplained conflict that hints toward some of the controversies that would pepper his career.

After he ceased coaching, Hering continued to study law at Notre Dame, earning a law degree in 1902. Beginning in his student years, he also taught English and American Colonial History at the university until 1905, and was, according to reporting at the time, the first Protestant to join the Notre Dame faculty.

== Business and Political Career ==
After leaving the university, Hering stayed in South Bend and began his lifelong career as an orator and public figure working as a political operative during the 1900 Congressional election season. A one-time Republican, he left the party to join the Democrats in 1900 and was tapped to make issue speeches at public gatherings. The speech-heavy public culture of the day afforded him many opportunities. He was usually identified in the press at this time as "Professor Frank Hering," since he was still teaching at Notre Dame.

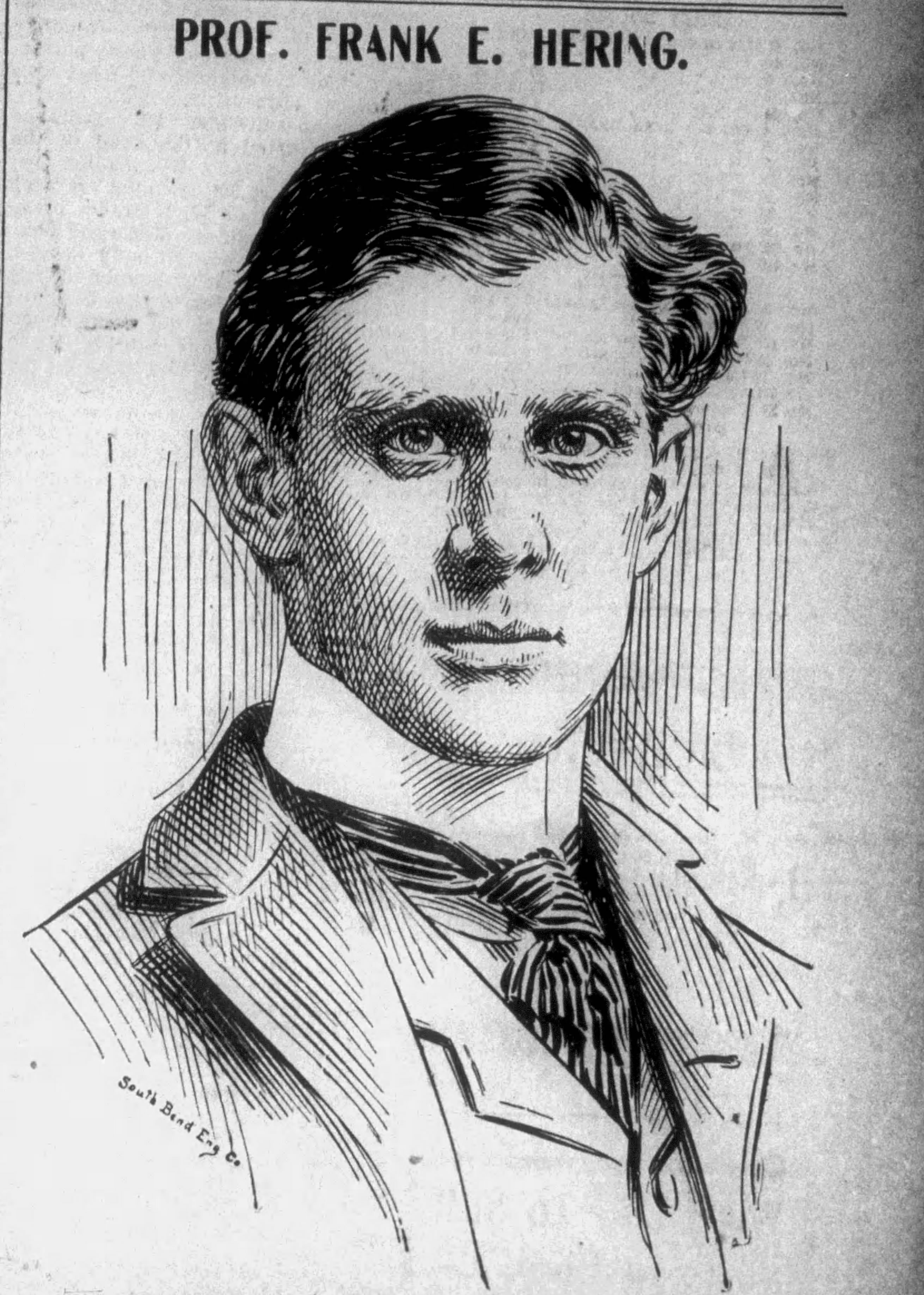
An engraving of Frank Hering published in the Elkhart Daily Truth in October 1902, as Hering was preparing to run for Congress for the first time.

For his first topic, Hering adopted William Jennings Bryan's passionate polemic in favor of adding silver coinage to the country's money supply. According to the coverage in the staunchly Republican South Bend Tribune coverage at the time, Hering's speeches were:

more interesting for the oratorial features than for the solidness of their arguments. These speeches gave Mr. Hering standing with the free silver element of the district and placed the party under obligations to him.

After the Democrats lost the election in South Bend's 13th Congressional District, Hering kept up a steady stream of public speaking appearances, aligning himself with social justice causes like publicly-funded insurance. He embraced the Democratic party's shift towards a more progressive agenda (which had begun in earnest with Bryan's 1896 presidential campaign), and regularly delivered speeches on "The History of Socialism."

By 1902, Hering had, by his public appearances, positioned himself as the obvious choice to run for Congress against the Republican incumbent, Abraham Brick. Hering was nominated on April 2, 1902, at a gathering of Democratic Party officials at the Centennial Opera House in Plymouth, Indiana. Hering ran as a pro-labor candidate, speaking out on behalf of unions. He did well at the polls in November but still lost, receiving 46.3% of the vote to Brick's 50.3%. He ran again in 1904, but lost by a larger margin, 40.1% to 52.5%

In 1902, he co-founded the firm Murphy & Hering with partner Daniel Murphy; the company harvested and stored ice from local bodies of water for sale to ice retailers in the region. Some of his ice houses were on the Notre Dame campus. The company also sold coal for heating residences.

== Fraternal Order of Eagles ==
In 1903, a local branch of the Fraternal Order of Eagles was established in South Bend, and Hering joined.

In the first thirty years of the 20th century, fraternal organizations boasted huge and loyal memberships and their leaders often commanded national attention. Many of these organizations, including the Eagles, offered "mutual aid" like health care and death benefits, long before the U.S. Government did. For middle-class Americans, these fraternal societies took on great significance as sources of both civic and social support, and their leaders were often invited to speak on matters of civic importance. The Fraternal Order of Eagles was a relative latecomer to the crowded field of fraternal societies - it was founded in 1898 - but it grew quickly, in part because of its comparatively open membership rules (Americans of any religion were welcome, but Black people were not - only "pure caucasions" were eligible for membership), and also due to its generous medical and burial benefits. Eagles literature boasted that "no Eagle lies in a potter's field."

By 1905, the Eagles claimed to have 1,300 local lodges, or "aeries," and the South Bend aerie boasted 450 members. In its heyday the group's annual national conventions, known as "Grand Aeries," were massive events during which tens of thousands of visitors descended on the host community. Cities competed for the honor of hosting the Grand Aerie each August; its opening ceremonies, parades, speeches and even officer elections were a spectacle for the public not unlike the Olympics today: in 1913, a relay of eight runners traveling five miles each carried a message of greeting from U.S. President Woodrow Wilson from the White House to the Eagles gathering in Baltimore, 40 miles away.

After his efforts in the political arena fell short, the Eagles proved an effective vehicle through which Hering built a national profile as a speaker and an outspoken advocate for social justice. He spent most of his career as a prominent member of the order, becoming its most influential representative in its peak years.

Hering was quickly recognized as a capable fraternal speaker and organizer. In 1904, he gave the annual memorial address to the Indianapolis aerie. In August 1905, at age 31, Hering was elected "grand treasurer" of the national Eagles organization at the order's annual convention. His appointment caused a flurry of excitement in the South Bend business community, as funds under the treasurer's management typically were invested in the treasurer's home town. "South Bend members are congratulating each other that so high an honor has come to South Bend," reported a local paper. "It usually goes to larger cities." When Hering returned to South Bend a week later, he was met by 300 Eagles at the train station, and then honored with a glittering banquet hosted by the city's mayor. South Bend banks eventually received some $275,000 (about $10 million in 2026 dollars) from the pooled dues of the roughly quarter-million Eagles members nationwide. This appointment began Hering's long career as a well-known Eagles figure, with substantial influence or control over the large-scale resources generated by the membership. Hering himself was known to point out that salaries for Eagles "grand officers" were higher than those of any other fraternal organization.

Although Hering still maintained his ice business, the demands of managing the treasury, and traveling for Eagles commitments, began to consume a growing portion of his professional attention. As early as January 1906, the Indiana state organization was putting his name forward for Grand Worthy President. At the 1906 national convention, Hering secured permission from the Eagles leadership to open formal offices of the Eagles' treasury in South Bend.

Hering was re-elected Treasurer in 1906 and in 1907. In 1908, he was elected the national vice president, which under Eagles rules meant he was next in line for president; he became Grand Worthy President of the national Eagles organization in August 1909, at the annual convention in Omaha, Nebraska. He was 35.

As president, Hering aggressively worked to revoke the charters of aeries that used the privacy of the Eagles lodges to circumvent local laws against serving liquor, known colloquially as "lids."

As described by a reporter at the time, Hering was determined "to purge the order of any grafters and law breakers.... The order's branches in some states - aeries, they are called - are burdened with undesirables, and that law-breaking is winked at, if not encouraged."

=== Battles at the 1910 Grand Aerie ===
After serving his one-year term as president, Hering became embroiled in a bitter and highly dramatic succession fight at the national convention in St. Louis in August 1910. The episode culminated with Hering fainting on the stage in front of hundreds of onlookers, an event which received national press attention.

Under the Eagles' constitution, the outgoing national president took up the post of chairman of the trustees, while the serving vice president automatically ascended to the presidency, as Hering had in 1909. But in 1910 the vice president was Thomas F. Grady, a state senator from New York and a member of the corrupt Tammany Hall political machine. As Hering prepared to become the trustee chairman, he saw Grady - a well-known tippler and indifferent to reform - as the wrong kind of Eagle and the wrong successor.

Hering's choice for the next Grand Worthy President was Theodore Bell, a former U.S. Congressman from California and, along with Conrad Mann, one of Hering's key allies in the Eagles. Because of the automatic ascendancy of the vice president, the only way to install Bell as president instead of Grady was to amend the order's constitution. Hering and his allies successfully passed an amendment that changed the selection mechanism of the president to a full vote of convention delegates, but they were unable to get the amendment passed before Grady officially took over the presidency on August 25, and were unable to make it retroactive. So Grady stayed in the president's chair.

The convention at the Olympic Theater then took on operatic dimensions as Hering and his allies demanded that the Trial Committee expel four past grand officers of the order for misallocation of funds.

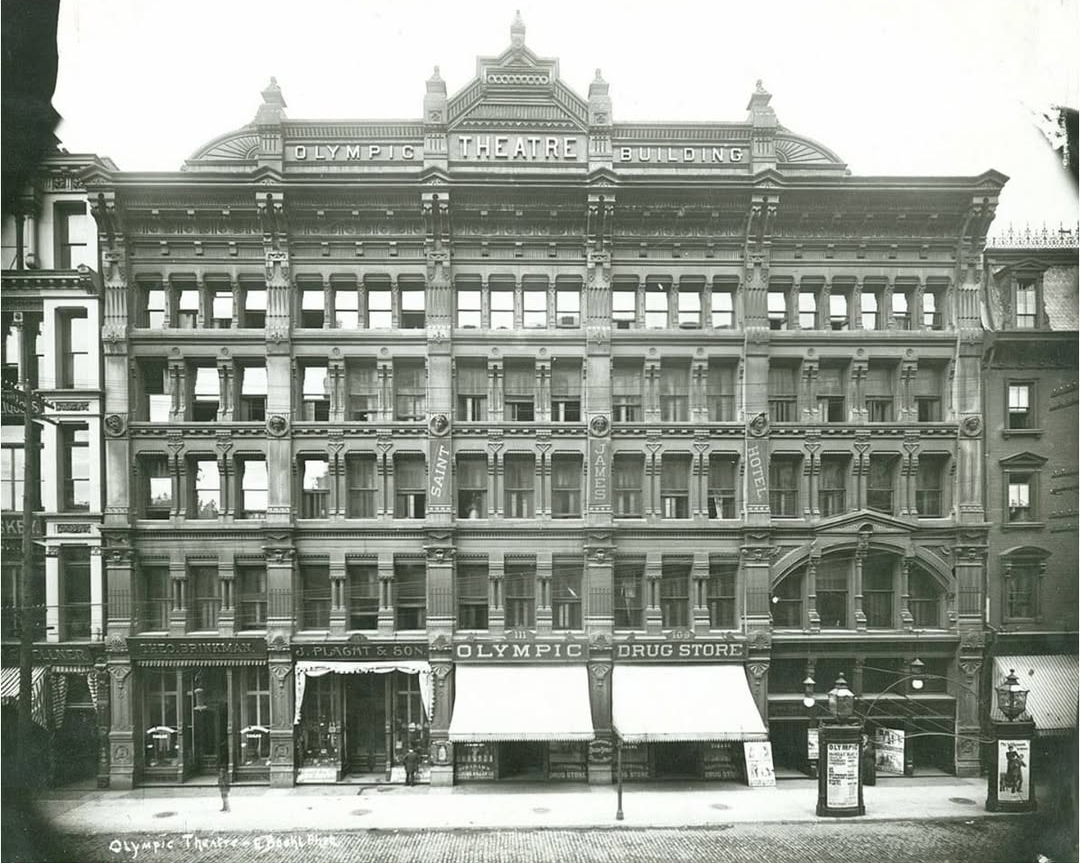
St. Louis's Olympic Theater, where the dramatic confrontations of the 1910 Grand Aerie took place

Before the Trial sessions, Hering had declared to the press:

I will see that my policies are carried out to the letter. There is no more surmising and talk of opposition. The illegal clubrooms will be abolished; undesirable members will be expelled; and those found guilty of anything criminal will be given penal servitude. Opposition has disappeared, and we will carry out the reform to the utmost.

But opposition had not disappeared. After hours of the delegates thundering at one another, the committee voted to expel the four alleged grafters, among them two Past Grand Worthy Presidents of the national order, including Hering's predecessor. As the voting ended, a crowd of delegates outraged by the expulsion stormed the meeting hall in the Olympic, led by John E. Cline of Cincinnati. Cline verbally attacked Hering and the reform faction from the floor. According to the St. Louis Globe-Democrat, when Cline sat down,

...A storm of applause broke loose, and delegates all over the hall were on their feet, cheering and shouting at the top of their voices, some of them trying to get recognition to speak. At this juncture Hering arose. and, with outstretched arms, exclaimed in an appeal for order:
"This is no ball game."
Then he faltered, staggered and sank into his chair. His collapse added to the confusion, and the convention was a scene of great excitement for a time. There were those among the delegates who said they believed Hering's fainting spell was a "four flush" sprung in order to save the day at a time when he feared the opposition would sweep the convention and possibly turn the tables on the triumphant reformers. Hering's friends indignantly repudiated this insinuation which they branded as cowardly.

Hering was carried unconscious to his hotel by his loyalists, where it was declared he was suffering from "nervous exhaustion" after three sleepless days of floor fights. He resumed his duties the next day and then passed the baton of his presidency to Grady.

Hering also had enemies outside the Eagles. In 1910, he published an essay in the February 15 edition of the Mid-West Eagle, noting that Eagles lodges were having trouble delivering promised medical care benefits to members because doctors were refusing to provide services at prices the lodges could afford. The Journal of the American Medical Association responded promptly, pointing out that the Eagles offered doctors $2.00 a year to care for each member's family. "The terms are such as no self-respecting physician could afford to accept," the journal wrote.

Unless the order has some better excuse for its existence than acting as middleman between physicians and patients and furnishing medical service for an entire family at the rate of four cents a week, its further existence is not warranted.... If it is true that this organization can only exist by paying pauper wages to its physicians, then we can see no reason why it should not go into bankruptcy, and the sooner the better.

This public feud highlighted Hering's early focus on benefit programs for working Americans - as well as the complex challenges involved in developing a working and sustainable entitlement system. As an early and ardent opponent of healthcare entitlements, the AMA would remain hostile to Hering's social agenda for years.

== Divorce Scandal ==
In 1911, Hering was the subject of months of breathless front-page headlines in the South Bend press following his divorce from his first wife, and marriage to his second.

On October 19, 1909, Hering's wife Florence, née Dalmond, was granted a divorce after fourteen years of marriage. In the divorce proceedings, Florence Hering charged her ex-husband with "cruelty and desertion." Hering did not contest the accusation. An alimony judgment of $10,000 was entered against Hering, who secured an agreement with Florence to pay the alimony in $1,000 annual installments.

Three months later, on January 20, 1910, Hering married his second wife, Claribel Ormsby Orton, in Milwaukee, Wisconsin. According to newspaper accounts, Hering sought to marry quietly and without the publicity that he more typically sought - possibly because a divorce and quick remarriage did not fit his reputation as an upright social reformer and fraternal leader.

Indiana reporters chasing down local rumors followed Hering to Milwaukee, where they determined that Hering had obtained a marriage license from the city offices. Hering denied that any wedding was in the works, but when confronted with the license, he issued a formal, typewritten statement acknowledging that he was marrying Claribel Orton that afternoon at her mother's home in Milwaukee. Hering's fortunes were considerably improved by the marriage; his second wife was from a Milwaukee family of considerable means, and was the widow of a wealthy South Bend railroad executive who had died in 1908.

Thirteen months after the wedding, Hering's first wife Florence sued his second wife, Claribel, for "alienation of affections." This tort law is more commonly known as the "homewrecker law," and is generally used to hold third parties accountable for extra-marital affairs that end a marriage.

The lawsuit accused Claribel of having "put forth every effort to separate Mr. Hering and his wife," and of

having used artifice, cunning and temptation to allure and alienate the affections of the man from his lawful wife. It is claimed as a result of these charges Mr. Hering became so abusive toward his wife she was forced to divorce him. The present Mrs. Hering is said also to have paid frequent visits before her marriage to the office of Mr. Hering in the Dean Building. It is also claimed she left the city at intervals in his company.

Six weeks after Florence filed her lawsuit, newspapers reported (with much smaller headlines) that the scandal was over: Frank Hering presented the court with an affidavit signed by Florence withdrawing her claim, and the alienation of affections suit was formally dismissed.

But a week later, the divorce came roaring back to the front pages, this time with stories promising “sensational” revelations. Florence sought to reinstate her claim against Claribel, and added a second $50,000 lawsuit, this one for assault and intimidation, against Hering’s lawyers and the Pinkerton detectives working for them.

According to this new lawsuit, Florence had received a visit from legendary Los Angeles criminal lawyer Earl Rogers, who was as famous for his flamboyant courtroom behavior as he was for his heavy drinking. With Rogers was Edward Hirsch, a Baltimore union leader. Both men were Eagles. The fact that midwestern Hering was able to enlist a west coast lawyer and an east coast union boss for this task speaks to the national reach and influence of Hering's Eagles network.

In her affidavits, Florence Hering told that court that Rogers had, “in a highly insolent manner,” warned her to drop her lawsuit against the new Mrs. Hering. Otherwise, Florence Hering said, she was told that

Mr. Hering would arrange to kill her if she did not dismiss the case, that he would destroy her reputation for honor and chastidy [sic] and that he had already made arrangements to prosecute her sister, May E. Jennings, for blackmail.

Florence also alleged that Rogers promised her the full $10,000 of adjudicated alimony if she withdrew her suit, but in a second meeting only gave her $6,000. Days later, Florence Hering filed a fourth lawsuit, this time in Illinois, alleging that her husband and his representatives were again bringing illicit influence to bear to get the latest suits dismissed.

The defendants countered in preliminary filings that it was not Rogers, but Florence’s own lawyer, Jonas Hoover, who had threatened her. The next day, Florence filed a fifth lawsuit to claim the alimony she said she was still owed, $3,390.38.

At the end of May 1911, the South Bend Circuit Court judge ruled that Florence Hering’s original lawsuit alleging that she had been threatened and intimidated was invalid, because she had accepted the $6,000 payment in Chicago, and had not returned it when she filed her suit. In the judge’s view, the cases were solely intended to squeeze money from the defendants, who had acted “in good faith.”

That October, Florence Hering agreed to withdraw her suits; in exchange, Hering agreed to pay her the full amount of her alimony, as well as $1,000 in interest.

== Eagles Power Struggle ==
In August 1911, Hering traveled to San Francisco for the annual convention, or "Grand Aerie," of the FOE. The San Francisco gathering was immense; some 40,000 Eagles attended.

The new rules pushed through by Hering the year before now allowed Eagles at the convention to campaign for the presidency, and Hering set about doing exactly that. Sitting President Thomas Grady, a Hering rival, did not attend the convention. This left a leadership and prestige vacuum that Hering, as the chairman of the trustees and the immediately previous president, exploited comfortably.

Since taking over the treasurer's position in 1905, Hering had steadily consolidated power over the Eagles. Even though he was a declared reformer, his grip on the organization led some newspapers to call Hering and his group the "conservative" or the "machine" faction.

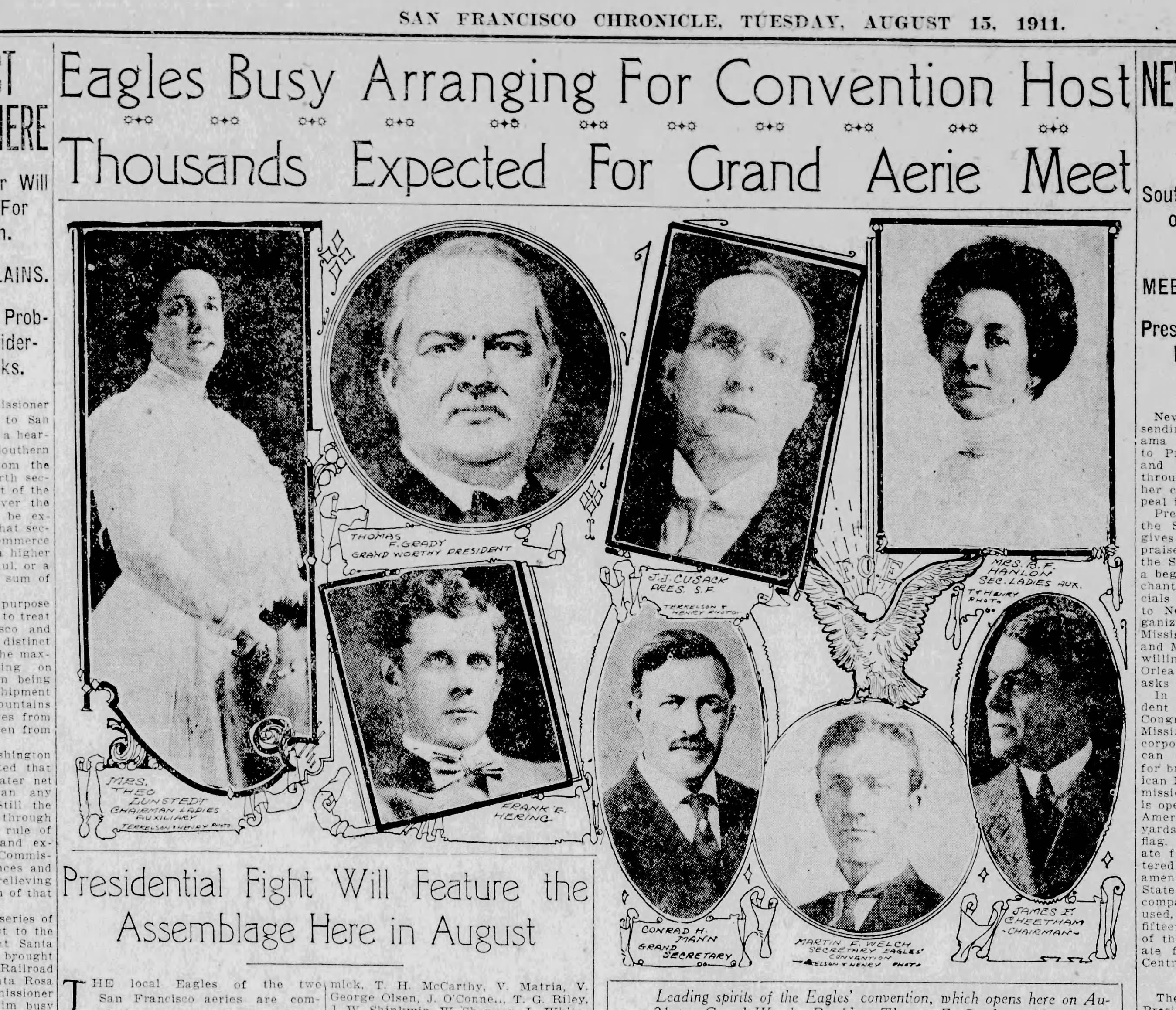
This San Francisco Chronicle illustration includes the two candidates vying for control of the Fraternal Order of Eagles in 1911: Frank Hering (center-left, bottom) and J.J. Cusack (center-right, top)

Some lower-level leaders of the Eagles felt that it was time to end what they called Hering's "one-man rule." This opposition was called an "insurgency," and the Eagles drama was carefully tracked and reported in the press. "Already much activity has been manifested in the fight at local aeries around the country," wrote the San Francisco Chronicle. "Indications point to the fact that the contest will prove one of the most bitterly fought since the organization of the order."

Opposition to Hering coalesced around a California-based delegate named J.J. Cusack, who was San Francisco's assistant city treasurer. Cusack and his allies hinted darkly at profligate spending by the "old guard," and insisted on transparent national budgets, among other reforms.

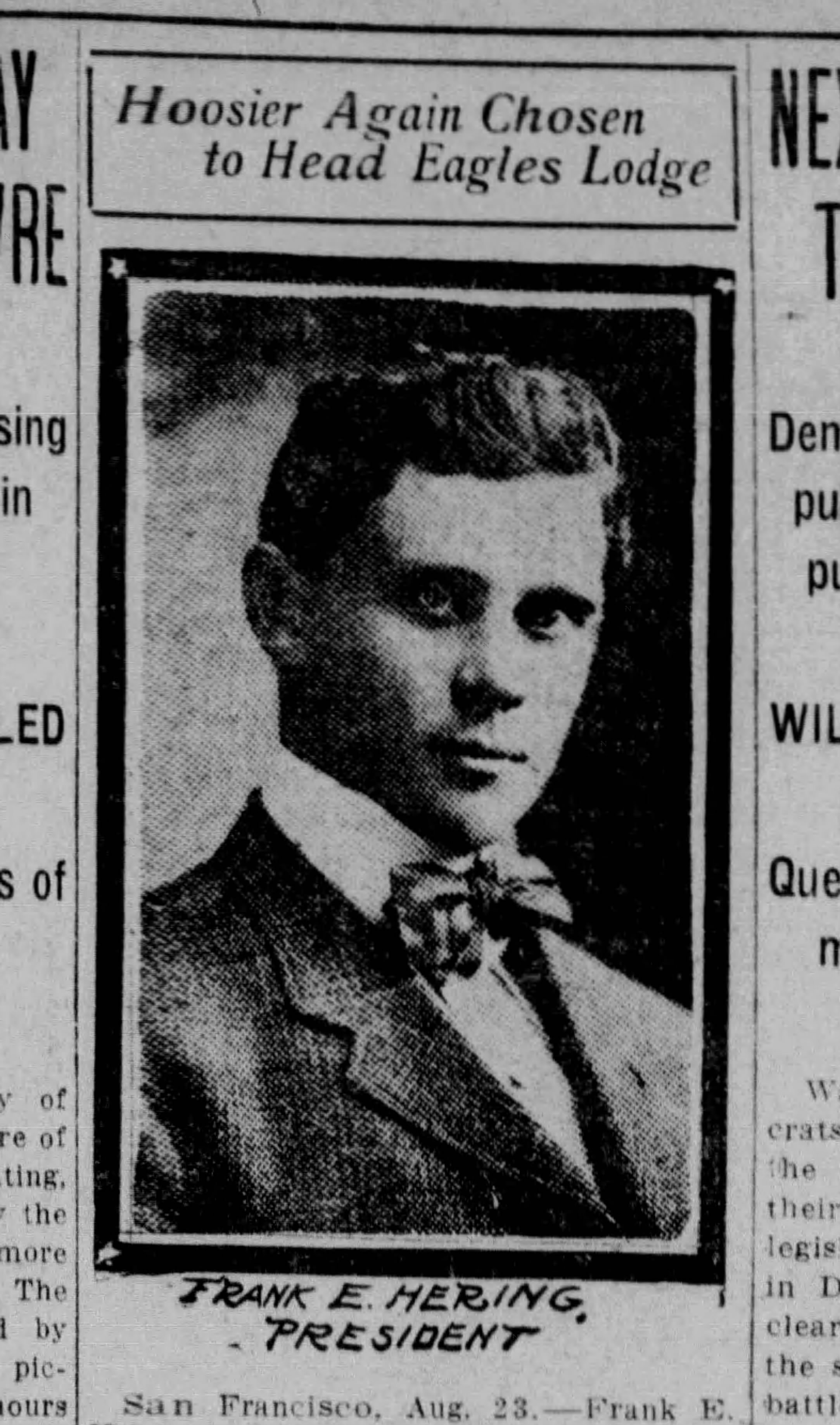
Frank Hering's victory at the San Francsico Grand Aerie is announced in the Muncie Star Press

Anticipating a tough floor fight for the nomination against a local California Eagle, Hering staged a clandestine maneuver: on the weekend before the national convention, he and a handful of key allies traveled 60 miles east to Stockton, California, where the California state convention was being held. There they secured the endorsement of some 100 past presidents of California aeries. Hering then returned in triumph to San Francisco with this vote of confidence in hand. This was especially embarrassing to Cusack, who as a Californian was expected to have the state group's loyalty.

The Cusack faction admitted that Hering "had put one over on them," but vowed to fight on. Said one:

We're not afraid. This fight hasn't really begun yet. We have some things up our sleeve that we are going to hold until the right time. Hering has been a capable president, but he has been in power too long and has made many enemies.

Cusack made the assignment of power to state offices a key plank of his platform, but Hering outflanked him, publishing columns in local papers declaring that he, too, favored more control for the state-level organizations. "All matters which come within the jurisdiction of the state and belong rather to the state aerie than the Grand Aerie will be placed in the hands of the States," he wrote.

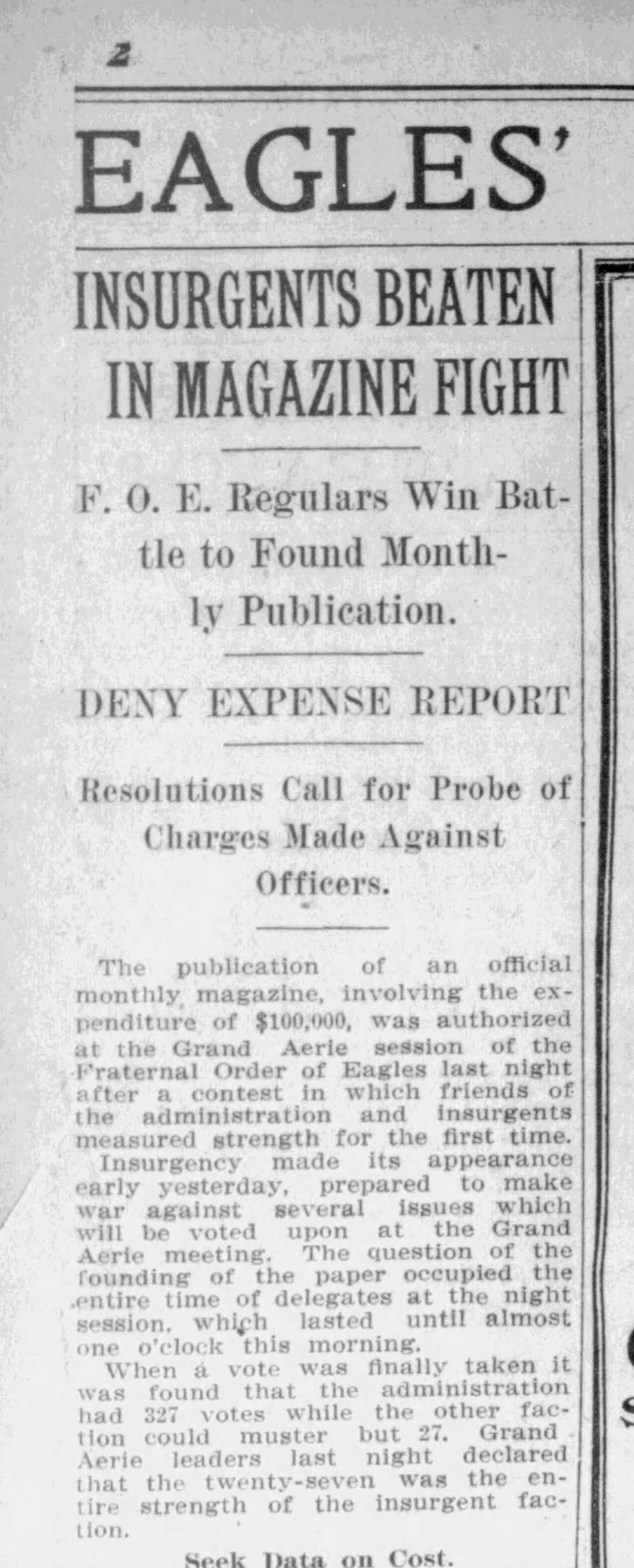
Headline in the Cleveland Leader describing the fight over founding The Eagles Magazine

After three days of jockeying and lobbying delegates, Hering's faction began to gain the upper hand. After securing promises of greater fiscal transparency, Cusack withdrew.

The San Francisco Call Bulletin reported:

The vine of insurgency in the grand aerie convention of the Eagles, carefully planted and nurtured by a small group of San Franciscans, blossomed, bore fruit, and withered, all in the space of a few hours yesterday. The crisis of the big meeting has passed, for after the stormy business session in which both sides explained their positions and made broad concessions, a genuine love feast was held with all the factions united in support of Frank E. Hering of Indiana for next grand president of the order.

Hering won re-election, and began serving his term that September. He was the first Grand Worthy President to be named to the position twice. He spent the year of his second presidency pushing aggressive recruitment - he claimed to have added 100,000 members to the rolls by the following August - and pursuing his moral reforms. At the 1912 Grand Aerie in Cleveland, Ohio, as Hering's second term came to a close, the Eagles voted to withhold the group's famous medical benefits for illnesses caused by alcohol or "immoral conduct." The order also agreed that initiates would no longer be blindfolded during their induction rituals.

In Cleveland, Hering did not pursue the presidency for a third term. Instead, he pivoted to a new strategy. He and his longtime ally Conrad H. Mann of Missouri successfully lobbied for the FOE to create and fund a monthly Eagles magazine. The amount to be set aside for this publication was $100,000, approximately $3.4 million in 2026 dollars. Hering was to be its first editor.

Most fraternal orders published a magazine for members, but to some Eagles, this arrangement smacked of self-dealing, and opponents of the magazine made their concerns known. Virtually the entire August 6 session of the convention was consumed by debate over the founding of the magazine, with arguments continuing until 1:00 AM. But again, the "insurgents" who dared to challenge Frank Hering lost. When the vote was taken, those in favor of funding the magazine crushed the opposition, 327 to 27. Mann, the chairman of the trustees, promptly appointed outgoing president Frank Hering as managing editor of the new magazine.

Hering held the editor's job without pause from the first issue until his death in July 1943. As Grand Worthy Presidents came and went, he remained a constant and influential voice in all Eagles affairs.

== From Iceman to Chicken Champion ==
In 1912, Hering's ice business was buried in debt, and the partnership with Daniel Murphy was dissolved. According to their bankruptcy filing, Hering had not run the business in two years. By the time the business closed, Hering was a full-time Eagles official with additional income soon to come from the The Eagle Magazine.

He continued to dabble in business - in 1913, he won multiple prizes in a Chicago poultry show for Campine chickens he bred on Hering farm, a poultry business in what is now the Chain-O-Lakes district in western South Bend. In 1914, he entered 25 Single-Combed Leghorn chickens in a competition in Indianapolis - 24 of them won prizes.

== "Father of Mother's Day" ==
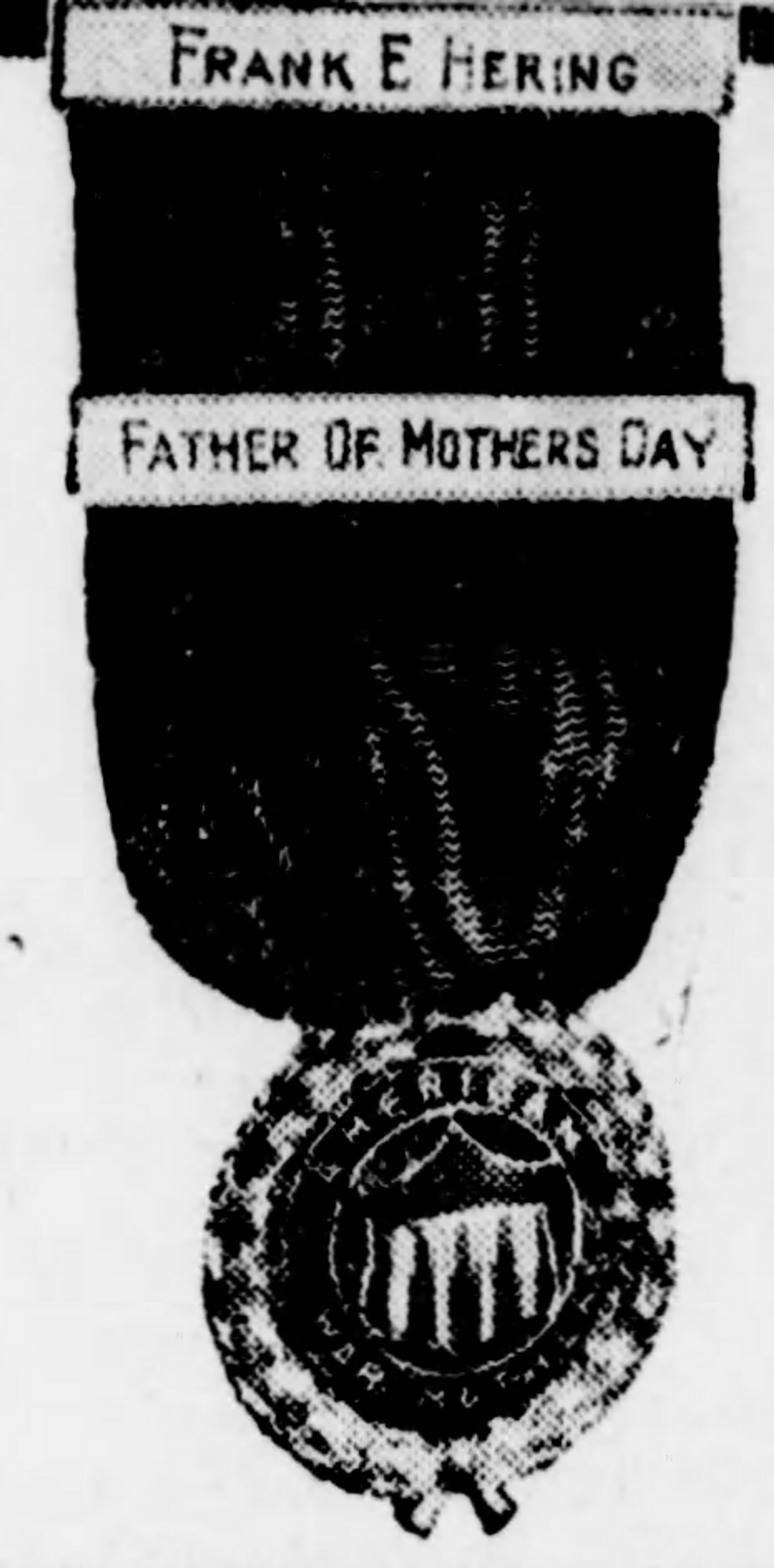
Newspaper illustration showing Frank Hering's medal from the American War Mothers

Throughout his life, Hering was credited with leading public awareness campaigns on a number of issues he cherished. One of those was the establishment of a national holiday for Mother's Day.

On February 7, 1904, as he was rising in the ranks of the Eagles, Hering gave an impassioned speech to the members of the Indianapolis Eagles lodge at the English Opera House, advocating for the establishment of an annual, nationwide day of recognition for mothers. According to one history, it was as a teacher at Notre Dame that Hering first observed that "practically every boy had as his sweetheart, his mother; and the surest way to appeal to him for his best efforts in building his character and his grades—these things greatly to be desired—was to remind him of the deep happiness his mother receives." At the 1912 Grand Aerie in Cleveland, Hering saw to it that a yearly celebration of Mother's Day would be observed at all the local lodges; two years later, in 1914, President Woodrow Wilson issued a proclamation making Mother's Day a national tradition.

By that time, a battle had already erupted over who deserved credit for the holiday. Today the movement to establish a day honoring mothers is traced at least as far back as 1870, with Julia Ward Howe's "Appeal to Womanhood Throughout the World," now more commonly known as her "Mother's Day Peace Proclamation." Howe was less interested in a celebration like our modern Mother's Day, and was focused on bringing women together to use their unique perspective to push back against the male tendency to make war.

Even before Howe, social activist Ann Reeves Jarvis publicized the notion of a day of empowerment among mothers. In 1858, Reeves Jarvis organized her first Mother's Day Work Club, dedicated to reducing the scourge of infant mortality. When Jarvis died in 1905, her daughter Anna Jarvis picked up the torch of a mother's holiday, but changed its meaning substantially to a much more doting and sentimental tribute to one's own beloved mother. (Historians have pointed out that Anna Jarvis's predecessors used "mothers'" plural in the holiday name, while she opted for "mother's" in the singular.) Nevertheless Anna Jarvis's letter-writing campaign built the most substantial momentum toward the official establishment of the holiday. Her first earnest events were held in 1908; more than 15,000 people attended her speech in Philadelphia. Jarvis is today recognized as the holiday's essential proponent and founder.

=== Controversy ===
Where Hering's advocacy fits into this story has been debated for years. There is little question that Hering's early campaigning brought substantial momentum to the movement for a Mother's Day holiday; he delivered his English Opera House speech a year before Ann Reeves Jarvis died and four years before Anna Jarvis's first celebrations, and he saw to it that the Eagles aeries nationwide carried the message. The FOE's close relationship with newspapermen, especially in the midwest, added to the drumbeat of Mother's Day messaging (and to the notion that the holiday was Hering's idea.) By 1912, newspapers regularly reported that "Hering was the originator of Mothers' Day, now generally observed throughout the land."

But as the person most directly responsible for establishment of the official holiday, Anna Jarvis deeply resented any credit given to Hering or anyone else, and made many public statements denigrating his role. For Jarvis, Mother's Day was not only her idea, it was her intellectual property. "[R]eference works of almost every kind," she wrote,

including dictionaries, and encyclopedias, in this and foreign countries... credit me as the originator.... My files are filled with thousands of testimonials to me as founder of this day. . . . Every basic feature, name, emblem, dates and slogan established by me in connection with this day has been appropriated by him. You are not asked to take sides in this matter but to do me the justice of refraining from furthering the selfish interests of this claimant, who is making a desperate effort to snatch from me the rightful title of originator and founder of Mother’s Day, established by me after decades of untold labor, time, and expense.

In 1925, members of the American War Mothers stepped into the controversy. The AWM had made Mother's Day a part of their public ritual, and they sought to form an alliance with Anna Jarvis. She refused, accusing them of "vanity and hypocrisy." In response, the AWM announced that Hering's campaign was earlier than Jarvis's (this was certainly true, though they ignored Howe's and the elder Jarvis's 19th-century contributions), anointed Hering the holiday's founder and invited him to give the keynote address for their Mother's Day ceremonies at the Tomb of the Unknown Soldier in Arlington National Cemetery.

These events added weight to Hering's claim - and further enraged Jarvis. Four months later, she pushed her way into a convention of the American War Mothers and interrupted the proceedings in protest. After the women of the AWM physically shoved her out onto the sidewalk, she "threw all caution to the winds and hurled invective at the women" until nearby traffic policemen arrested her. She was charged with disorderly conduct; the charges were dropped three days later.

In 1929, the AWM presented Hering with a medal honoring him as the "Father of Mother's Day." He was at the time only the fifth American to receive such a medal, and the sole civilian.

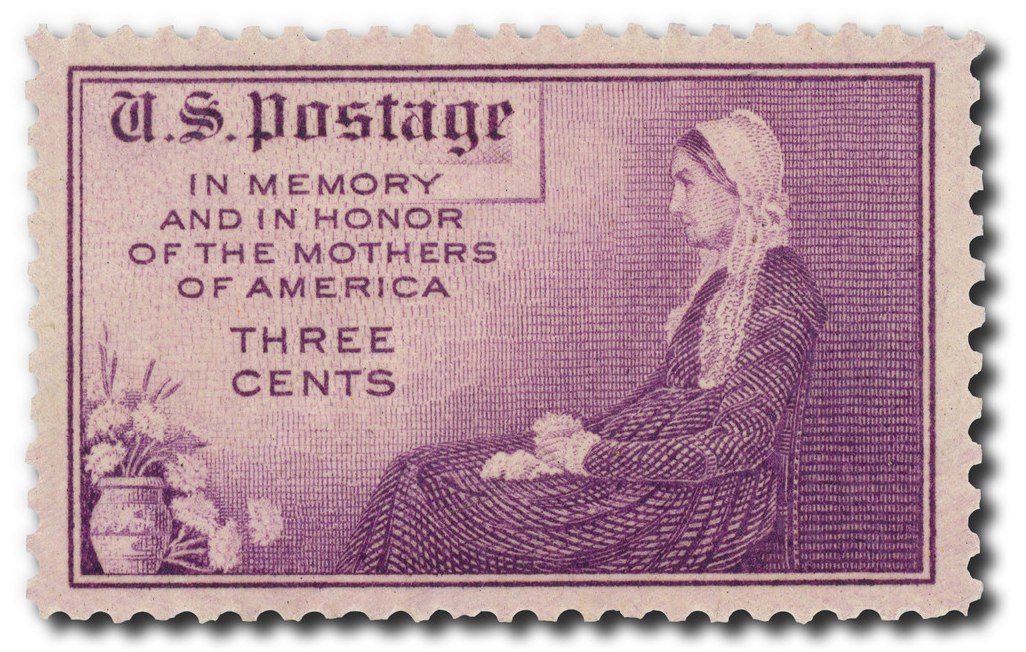
The "Mother's Day" stamp, featuring a portion of the well-known painting Whistler's Mother by James McNeill Whistler, was designed by Franklin Roosevelt in 1934

Infuriated, Jarvis sneered, "Anyone can buy a medal and give it to any person they please, but it is a joke on its wearer if his vanity and lack of truthful honor will ever permit him to show it."

In 1934, as the 20th anniversary of Wilson's Mother's Day proclamation approached, the American War Mothers lobbied President Franklin D. Roosevelt for the creation of a stamp memorializing the holiday. After some initial reluctance, Roosevelt agreed, and designed the stamp himself. Jarvis was outraged that the design included white carnations, the emblem that she herself had conceived as the symbol of Mother's Day; she intervened in the process and made sure that the stamp did not include the phrase "Mother's Day."

In the end, U.S. Representative from Indiana Samuel Pettengill publicly linked the stamp to Frank Hering, and arranged for the stamps to be issued in South Bend a day earlier than the rest of the country in Hering's honor.

In retrospect, it's clear that Hering's 1904 original proposal, and Anna Jarvis's 1905 idea were closely aligned: both focused on a sentimental ennoblement of one's own mother rather than a day of solidarity and action among mothers. And intentionally or not, over time the Eagles expanded their vision of mother's day to embrace Howe's anti-war message and Ann Reeves Jarvis's cause of healthcare. But to the end of her life, Jarvis would speak out against Hering as an "imposter" and his AWM supporters as "peddling women."

== Crusading for Social Security ==
Mother's Day was only the first well-publicized social campaign for Hering. He spoke out for workers' compensation laws, and played a central role in the passage of the first American government benefits for the elderly.

In the early 1920s, there was no substantial movement for old age pensions in the U.S.; fifteen years later they were law in the form of the Social Security Act. This transformation of American awareness is widely credited to the activism of Frank Hering and his fellow Eagles nationwide.

=== Background ===
The entitlement programs we now know as Social Security were highly controversial in the interwar years. It was clear to policy-makers that a crisis of poverty was building in the U.S., especially concerning the aged poor, who typically spent their last years in poorly-funded poorhouses or almshouses under often execrable conditions. What was not clear was how to solve the problem, especially the questions of how funds would be contributed to relief programs and how the assets distributed.

European nations such as Germany, Hungary and the U.K. had put in place government-funded support for the elderly, especially the elderly poor. In the U.S. these programs were often dismissed as “socialism” by their opponents (which included Hering's old adversaries, the AMA), but in fact the programs themselves were generally put in place by moderates seeking to push back against Socialist and Communist pressures on the established political order.

In the U.S., early movements for senior-citizen benefits often ran into stiff opposition, not least because of the frontier mentality that exalted self-reliance and stoic endurance. The first substantial campaign was launched in the 1910s by the American Association for Labor Legislation (AALL), a group whose main goals were pragmatic rather than ideological (largely conceived by two professors at the University of Wisconsin-Madison, these principles were known as the “Wisconsin Idea”). But despite their efforts, the AALL was unable to get any legislation passed.

=== The Eagles Enter The Fight ===
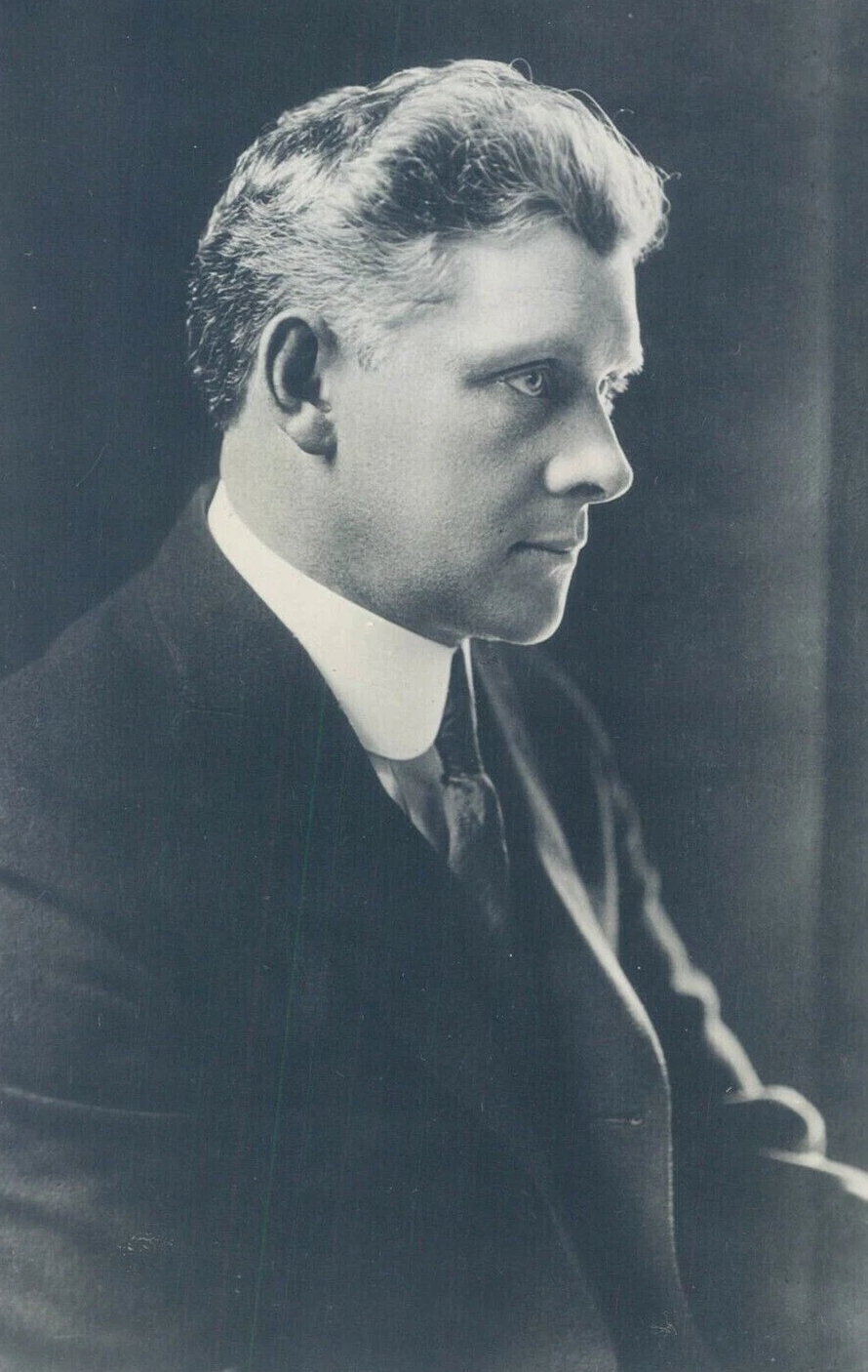
Publicity photo of Frank E. Hering in the mid-1920s, distributed by Fraternal Order of Eagles

The first American legislation awarding senior citizens government benefits was a direct result of the efforts of Frank Hering and the Fraternal Order of Eagles.

In 1921, Hering, by then a notable Eagle without peer, joined forces with former national president of the Eagles, Conrad “Con” Mann, to convince the Grand Aerie to commit to a legislative campaign on behalf of the elderly. Hering decried American attitudes toward the elderly:

We still cling to the Elizabethan Poor Law of 1601 and send our unfortunate aged to pauper institutions, humiliated, humbled, and, not infrequently, mistreated.... The United States is substantially the only country that says to her wage-earners, "Keep up your work as long as you can, as long as you are able to produce, and when that time has passed, we shall discard and scrap you, just as we do the machines upon which you are working, when they have outlived their usefulness."

Hering was appointed to lead the Eagles’ Old Age Pension Commission. For ten years, Hering and the Eagles spoke, lobbied and organized with the goal of pushing bills through state legislations; Eagles from many aeries served as the ground troops in this campaign, gathering facts, collaborating with local governing bodies, and keeping their mission in the public eye. By 1930, eleven states had such laws on the books. In 1931, after signing Colorado's pension law, Governor William Herbert Adams gave the signing pen to Hering, and publicly credited the Eagles for passing the law.

The first state to pass a senior-assistance law, in 1923, was Montana. The key ally in Montana was Democratic leader of the Montana state legislature, Lester Noble, who was an Eagle himself and would later become Grand Worthy President like Hering before him. Loble recalled years later:

In 1923 there was no awakened consciousness of the desire for old age pensions….The only organized effort made in behalf of the passage of this law was by the Fraternal Order of Eagles. Much credit is due to this organization which gave of its memberships, its money, and its time in assisting in the final adoption of the bill introduced. The leaders of this organization, Mr. Frank Hering of South Bend, Indiana and Mr. Conrad H. Mann of Kansas City, Missouri, were very important in the establishment of the first old age pension law in the United States.

Loble added: “The bill that finally passed was not mandatory but optional with the boards of county commissioners of the several counties. It is not the best old age pension law that could be drawn, but it was the best that could be secured in the pioneering of this movement.” This summarized the key weakness of the Eagles-driven campaign: they were unable to pass legislation that made the awarding of old-age pensions mandatory, meaning the laws had no teeth and depended on the goodwill and follow-through of local authorities.

Several of the laws were challenged by opponents and were subsequently overturned in the courts. In Hering's home state of Indiana, the legislature passed a pension law but the governor vetoed it. In Pennsylvania, the law pushed through with support from the Eagles was declared unconstitutional.

According to author Kenneth Davis, the Eagles participants were focused on visible public wins, and thus were willing to accept the passage of “paper victories” - laws that were technically pension provisions, but ultimately helped very few of the elderly citizens they were designed to support. At the same time, Davis acknowledges that the Eagles’ work was “highly effective in calling popular attention to old-age dependency as a great and growing social problem in America.”. In the debates to come over Social Security, Hering and the Eagles used the touching personal stories of the seniors they had managed to help as emotional anchors in their push for national legislation.

As governor of New York, Franklin D. Roosevelt made it clear he supported benefit programs like unemployment insurance and old-age pensions. For added support, he aligned himself with the Eagles’ campaign, and enlisted their help in drumming up support for the New Deal programs.

Early in his term as governor, Roosevelt joined a number of fraternal organizations, including the Masons, the Shriners, and the Eagles (it was not uncommon for men to belong to several of these clubs at the same time, especially politicians. Hering himself belonged to the Rotary Club, the Elks Club, the Masons and the Grange, as well as the Eagles).

And in another critical way, the work of Hering and the Eagles carried over into the campaigns that led to the passage of federal old-age assistance: Abraham Epstein, who founded the advocacy group the American Association for Old Age Security (AAOAS), launched his career in the U.S. as Hering’s assistant; later, the two men parted bitterly over disagreements about strategy. Epstein and the AAOAS were responsible for collaborating with Frances Perkins, Roosevelt's Secretary of Labor, in shaping and drafting the legislation that would eventually pass in 1935 as the Social Security Act, providing the first guarantees of old-age assistance to American seniors.

When it finally was made law, in the form of the Social Security Act, Roosevelt presented one of the pens from the signing to the Fraternal Order of Eagles.

== Service to University of Notre Dame ==
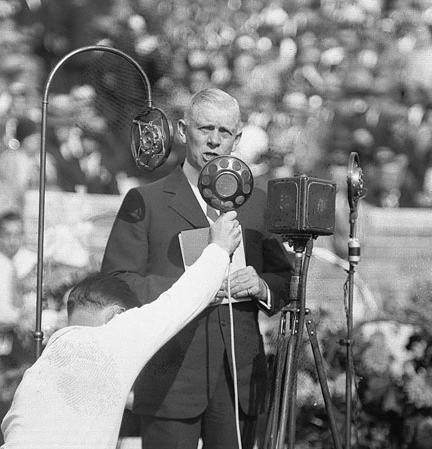
Frank Hering gives the address at the dedication of Notre Dame Stadium, October 11, 1930

Hering remained closely associated with the University of Notre Dame, serving as the national president of the alumni association and eventually as a lay trustee. Hering chaired the committees that found a site for and built Notre Dame Stadium, and he gave the primary speech at the dedication ceremony of the new arena when it opened in 1930. According to the South Bend Tribune, Hering's speech was awaited with great suspense; it was popularly believed he would conclude by announcing the new stadium's official name (it was also widely expected that the stadium would be named for beloved coach Knute Rockne). But Hering finished with no such announcement; the stadium was simply referred to as "Notre Dame Stadium" in official literature, and retains that name today - though it is also affectionately known as "The House That Rockne Built."

Hering would continue to be treated with special regard by the Notre Dame community as the university's "first formal coach of football."

== Lottery Scandal ==
In 1932, Hering, along with several other fraternal organization leaders, suffered a humiliating reputational blow when he was swept up in a federal criminal investigation of illegal lotteries.

=== Background ===
Anti-vice crusades in the late 1800s - led primarily by Anthony Comstock - led to widespread state bans on the use of lotteries, and in 1890, the U.S. forbade shipments of lottery tickets or advertisements across state lines, effectively ending all lotteries in the U.S. for 70 years. But lotteries, known more commonly today as “raffles,” remained a popular form of local fund-raiser for social groups of all kinds, from churches to police departments, since players risked very low sums of money for a small chance at a substantial prize, and the events could produce substantial revenues. Fraternal orders, with their large national memberships and busy social calendars, continued to hold lottery-like contests, which eventually drew the attention of federal investigators.

=== Charges and Trial ===
On August 18, 1932, the U.S. Attorney’s office in New York indicted Hering and his lifelong Eagles ally, Conrad H. Mann, for violating federal lottery laws, including shipping tickets by mail. Mann was by this time a personal friend of president Herbert Hoover; Hoover had appointed Mann to his unemployment commission. Indicted along with them was a sitting U.S. Senator and former Secretary of Labor, James J. Davis, who was accused of committing the same crimes on behalf of the Loyal Order of Moose. Because the defendants were men of national reputation - Hering was by this time a trustee of the University of Notre Dame - the story drew steady headlines, especially in the Midwest, the heartland of the fraternal societies.

Hering met the charges with a fiery speech of resistance. "We will carry this case clear to the United States Supreme Court, if necessary," he announced to reporters after being notified of his indictment. Hering pointed out that the defendants had intentionally avoided using the U.S. Postal Service, shipping their tickets instead using the package delivery service of Western Union (the Western Union corporation and one of its executives were also indicted). "Do you suppose such a gigantic corporation as the Western Union with a battery of attorneys would lend itself to a corrupt practice or that men of integrity would knowingly violate the law?" Hering accused the Justice Department of announcing the indictments for political purposes, to undermine Davis's upcoming run for reelection.

Mann and Hering’s trial began in Federal court in New York City on November 28, 1932. Their co-defendants were Bernard McGuire, a contest promoter, and his assistant Raymond Walsh. James Davis had been tried earlier but his case had ended in mistrial (he would be retried a year later and acquitted). All of the defendants were charged on two counts: transporting lottery tickets across state lines, and conspiracy to violate federal lottery laws.

As the story was laid out by prosecutor Louis Mead Treadwell, the defendants held contests that were lotteries in all but name. Worse, the prosecution painted a vivid picture of what they called a conspiracy to defraud the members of the Eagles and to pocket substantial profits from the ticket-selling.

Individual lodges had been running fundraisers on a small scale, and Eagles’ leadership decided that the professional promoters who organized them “were getting too much of a hold on the aeries, or local chapters, of the order.” In 1926 the Eagles unified the control of such promotions into a single “Department of Bazaars.” Mann was appointed the department’s managing director, with a contract that awarded him 40% of any profits the department produced. In 1930, promoter Bernard McGuire proposed to Mann and Hering a national set of contests. McGuire promised the two Eagles that they could effectively run a contest that was as far-reaching and as profitable as a national lottery, but which would stay safely within the boundaries of federal anti-lottery laws. Mann’s personal attorney testified that McGuire had said he “was familiar with the law, having had previous experience with such matters, and knew how it could be done legally.” (Part of this experience was in running a similar contest for Davis, his fellow defendant). In light of McGuire's assurances, Mann’s lawyer advised him that the plan was legitimate – but still recommended he “stay out of it” as the “risk of loss” was too great.

The workaround that McGuire devised was to sell tickets not specifically for prizes, but to “frolics and dances” that would be held at local aeries, as Eagle lodges were called. The promoters printed and distributed 4,400,000 tickets to the 879 chapters around the country using Western Union instead of the U.S. mail. Buying tickets to these events made the ticket-buyers eligible for $75,000 worth of prizes, distributed nationwide. The defendants claimed that the prizes would not be awarded by chance, or lot, but by some other means, thus avoiding the legal definition of “lottery.”

Although the statutes upon which the charges were based were narrowly drawn, the prosecution also used the trial to paint the defendants as corrupt. Many American men joined fraternal organizations in part because they offered life insurance benefits and old-age pension payments to their members before any such New Deal entitlements were available. The glow of patriotic, egalitarian charity was an essential ingredient of the Eagles’ culture. But according to the government, the total raised by the ‘frolics and dances’ was $1,750,000 (roughly $35 million in 2026), and yet only $440,000 of that money went back to the Eagles’ lodges, and none went to charitable giving.

Under the terms of the Eagles’ deal with McGuire and Walsh, Mann received $230,000, of which he gave a third - roughly $77,000 - to Hering ($4.5 million and $1.5 million respectively in 2026 dollars). As the defense pointed out, the organizers had to carry substantial up-front costs for these competitions, and these monies were intended as a guarantee they didn't lose money if the tickets sales were poor. The prosecutor himself acknowledged that “[t]he statute does not make it criminal to use fraud in the sale of lottery tickets or to make personal profits.” But for a nation facing the hardships of the early Depression, these were vast sums; the allegations of fraud were splashed across front pages nationwide, and the reputations of the Eagles’ leaders suffered.

The defense argued that the $400,000 given to local aeries – about $500 per chapter – had been donated to charities, and members of local chapters testified at the trial that they had done so. The judge deemed this testimony “irrelevant” but allowed it. But the defense was unable to refute evidence that the prizes from the “frolics” were awarded by chance or “lot.” In the final stage of the contest, members of the Eagles had set out on a boat cruise from Toledo, Ohio, onto Lake Erie, where they drew stubs from the tickets out of a barrel. This, defense attorney Max Steuer claimed, happened because a member of the group shouted out that they should choose the winners “the old-fashioned way.” “And after all,” said Steuer, “ that old-fashioned way, putting stubs in a barrel, mixing them up, and drawing, is the fairest way.”

The jury deliberated for seven hours, and returned guilty verdicts against Hering, Mann and McGuire on December 3. At the same time the jury delivered the verdicts, they recommended clemency in sentencing. Walsh, McGuire’s assistant, was acquitted, but according to news reports, reacted by repeating “What about the others? What about them?”

Even the prosecutor was overheard by the Associated Press reporter to mutter, "I guess I'm a rotten prosecutor. I don't think I can stand what this is doing to him."

Hering's rival for the honor of Mother's Day founder, Anna Jarvis, was in the courtroom to see him convicted.

On December 9, Federal Judge Frank Coleman sentenced Hering to 4 months in New York’s Federal house of detention, and a $4,000 fine. Conrad Mann received a 5-month sentence and a $12,000 fine. Bernard McGuire was sentenced to a year and a day in the federal penitentiary in Atlanta, and was also fined $12,000.

In his remarks at sentencing, Judge Coleman singled out Hering among the defendants as “the least guilty.”

It may well be that the defendants did not know they were violating a criminal statute and one may assume that they would not have perpetrated the acts complained of if they had known that they were committing a crime. However, they must have known that they were skirting a criminal law. I believe they took a chance of committing a criminal crime because of the very large profits which were to be divided between them. As to the guilt of the three defendants, I believe that Hering was the least culpable, his interest having been smallest and his activity least, as were his profits.

All three men were allowed to remain free pending appeal.

=== Pardons ===
Hering, Mann and McGuire appealed their convictions, and in April 1933, the U.S. Circuit Court reversed one of the two charges against them. The verdict for shipping lottery tickets was vacated and their fines were halved, but the conspiracy conviction was affirmed, and their prison sentences were left unchanged. As he had promised, Hering appealed to the U.S. Supreme Court, but his request for a hearing was denied in October.

On October 13, five days after the Supreme Court declined to hear Hering's case, U.S. Senator James J. Davis was acquitted of the exact same lottery crimes of which Hering had been found guilty. In the wake of Davis's exoneration, a growing list of worthies from South Bend and other parts of Indiana added their names to a petition for executive clemency for Hering, including Congressman Samuel B. Pettengill, Senator Frederick Van Nuys and the governors of Minnesota and New Jersey. Pettengill claimed that "91 Congressmen, 10 Governors, 12 U.S. Senators," the Vice President, the Speaker of the House, and two railroad presidents had all signed the petition.

On November 14, 1933, the day before their sentences were to begin, President Roosevelt granted Frank Hering executive clemency, on the condition that he pay his $2,000 fine by the end of the calendar year. The next day he granted Mann the same terms – just four hours after Mann began serving his sentence. McGuire, the promoter, received no such mercy, and served his sentence at the federal prison in Lewisberg, Pennsylvania.

Writing in 1937, author Charles Ferguson pointed out the paradox of Hering's prosecution:

The irony lay in the fact that the Fraternal Order of Eagles has always been not only a law-abiding but actually a reform organization...the two men sentenced for what seemed to be shady deals had led a nation-wide fight for workingmen's compensation and old-age pension laws.... With a program both liberal and vigorous, the Eagles have taken a more active part in politics and social engineering than has any other fraternal organization.

== Hering House ==
Hering and his second wife, Claribel, were known for their outreach programs in South Bend, including the establishment of Hering House—a community center for African-Americans—which opened late in 1924. Hering House was located at 732 W. Division Street, later renamed Western Avenue. According to an interview with John Charles Bryant in the Indiana University South Bend Civil Rights Heritage Center Oral History Project, the Hering House building originally belonged to the First Church of Christ Scientist, but the congregation outgrew the capacity of the building and relocated. Hering bought it for $1 and had the structure moved to West Division.

The center remained a hub of African-American activity and early civil rights action until 1960, when it closed its doors. Hering House, Inc., continued for some years as a charitable organization serving the South Bend Black community.

== Death ==
Hering died July 11, 1943, at his home in South Bend, Indiana, following several weeks of illness. Among the many tributes to Hering published in The Eagle Magazine was one attributed to President Roosevelt: "his name will be held in grateful remembrance by all who love fair play and equal justice to all."

In death at least, Hering escaped the reputational stain of his lottery conviction; few obituaries mentioned it, recalling instead his football feats, his Eagles career, and his role in proposing a national Mother's Day.

A week after Hering died, football coach Amos Alonzo Stagg was a guest at a luncheon in Stockton, California, and told the following story about his 1894 quarterback: Stagg said that when Hering was an undergraduate at University of Chicago, he was homesick at Christmas but had no money to get home to Pennsylvania. Stagg loaned him twenty dollars, and Hering traveled home for the holiday. Stagg said Hering left Chicago for Notre Dame without repaying the loan. Then, 35 years later, he received a note from Hering in the mail. Hering apologizing for the delay in making good the loan, and enclosed the twenty dollars, plus 133 dollars more in compounded interest. Stagg said he gave the money to other students in need.

== Notre Dame coaching record ==
=== Football ===
Year	Team	Overall	Conference	Standing	Bowl/playoffs
Notre Dame (Independent) (1896–1898)
1896	Notre Dame	4–3			
1897	Notre Dame	4–1–1			
1898	Notre Dame	4–2			
Notre Dame:		12–6–1			
Total:		12–6–1			
