= Eagles Temple (Canton, Ohio) =

- Eagles' Temple
- U.S. National Register of Historic Places
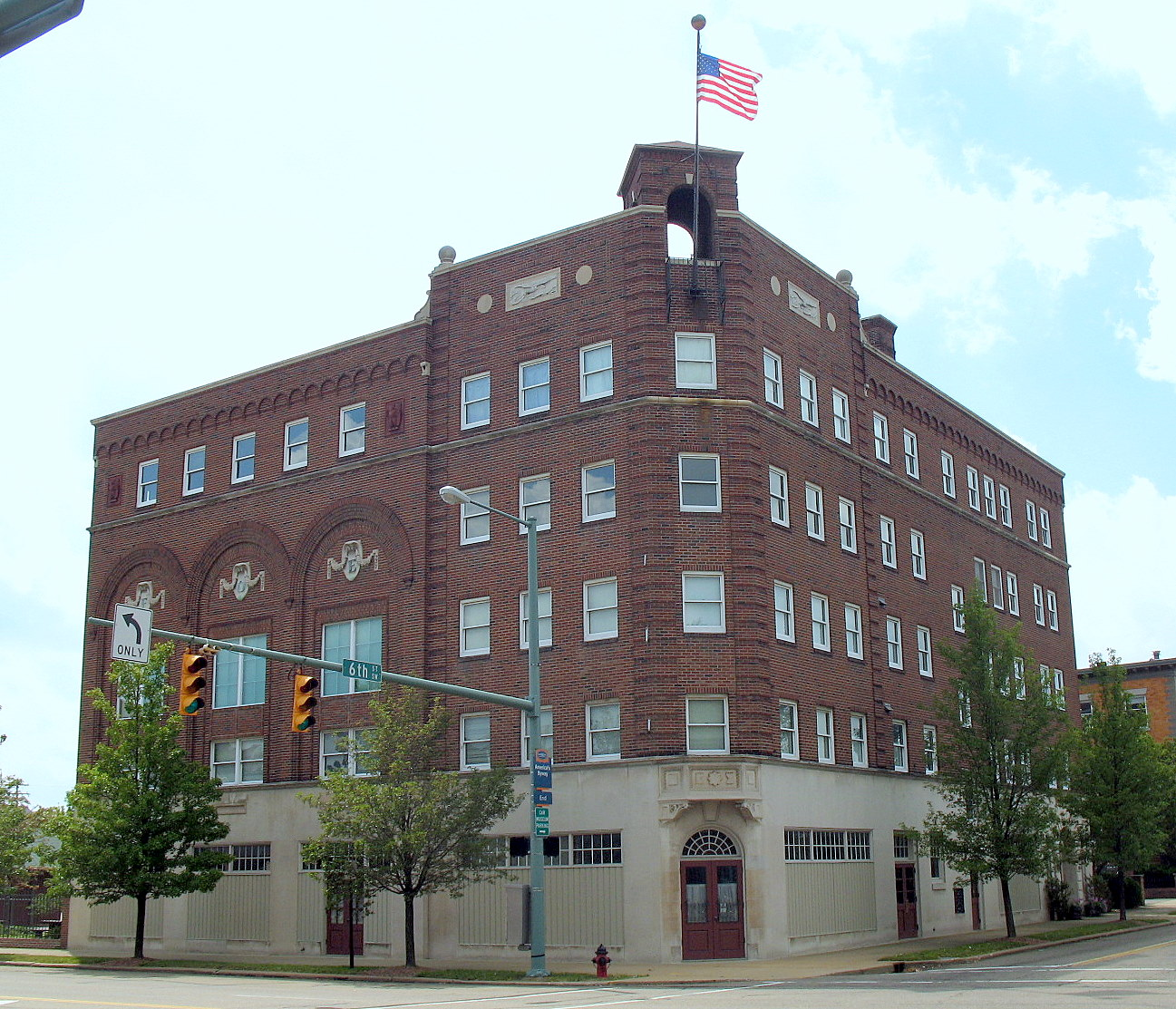
- Front of the temple

- Location within Ohio Location within the United States
- Location: 601 S. Market Ave., Canton, Ohio
- Coordinates: 40°47′41″N 81°22′32″W
- Area: less than one acre
- Built: 1927-28
- Architect: Thayer, Albert
- Architectural style: Spanish Colonial Revival
- NRHP reference No.: 82003646
- Added to NRHP: July 15, 1982

The Eagles Temple or Eagles' Temple in Canton, Ohio is a Spanish Colonial Revival building designed during 1927–28. It was listed on the National Register of Historic Places in 1982.

It is a five-story building designed by architect Albert Thayer. It is the only building built for the Canton Aerie 141, which was founded in 1901, and was the oldest chapter of the Fraternal Order of Eagles in Ohio.
