= Eagles Temple (Akron, Ohio) =

- U.S. National Register of Historic Places
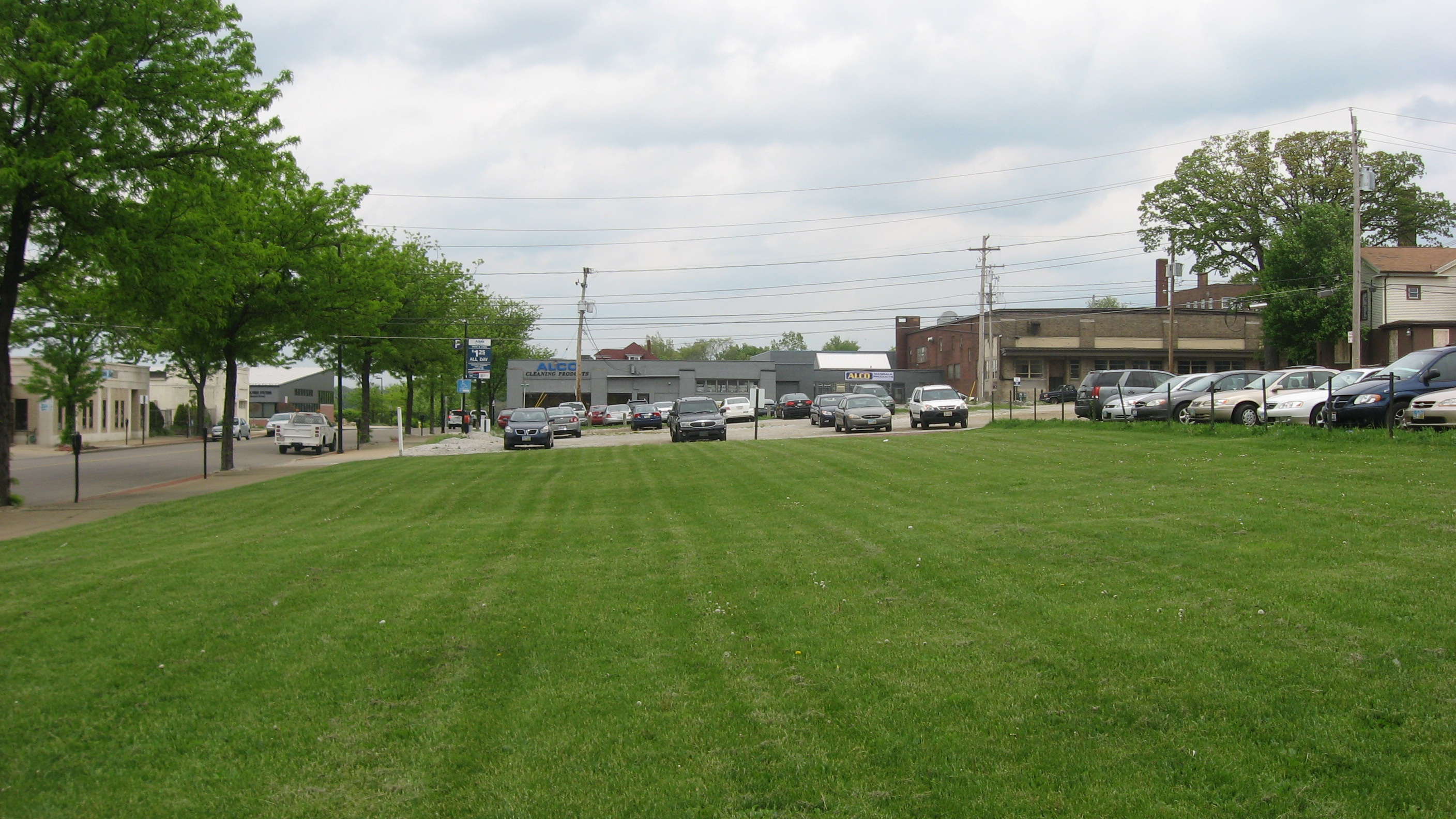
- Site of the building

- Location within Ohio Location within the United States
- Location: 131-137 E. Market St., Akron, Ohio
- Coordinates: 41°5′3″N 81°30′48″W
- Area: Less than 1 acre (0.40 ha)
- Built: 1918
- Architect: Boenisch, Kraus, and Helmkamp; C.W. & P. Construction
- Architectural style: Art Deco
- NRHP reference No.: 82003656
- Added to NRHP: June 1, 1982

The Eagles Temple was a prominent Fraternal Order of Eagles building in downtown Akron, Ohio, United States. With its high-styled Art Deco architecture, it was home to an organization with thousands of members, and it was designated a historic site when not yet sixty-five years old.

== Overview ==
Akron's Eagles aerie arranged for the construction of the building in 1917, contracting with the architectural firm of Boenisch, Kraus, and Helmkamp for the design. Founded in 1904, its new occupants were among the oldest local chapters of the FOE, which itself was established just six years before the Akron chapter. The original building was a large Neoclassical structure with a traditional masonry facade. Little more than a decade passed, and the members were no longer satisfied with the appearance of their meeting place; they rehired the original contractor to convert its appearance to the new Art Deco style with its early modern architecture influences. Construction was completed in 1930, by which time the Great Depression had begun, but the aerie remained financially strong. As the members saw it as their duty to help the poor in such dire times, the building was opened to assist non-members, and aerie money was spent on financing dinners for the indigent. In some months, the kitchens served more than eighteen thousand charity meals. Following the Second World War, the aerie continued to grow, with a membership roll surpassing eight thousand at points in the 1950s. By the late 1960s, the original building had become insufficient for the aerie's needs, due largely to transportation: the early members had commuted via streetcars, but with the rise of the automobile, there was nowhere for thousands of cars to be parked. A new building was finished in 1968, with extensive parking space, and the Temple was left empty. A Christian youth organization bought the building and ran a haunted house in it for five years, but left in 1974. The group sold the building in early 1987, and it was demolished in May of the same year.

Following the reconstruction of 1930, the Eagles' Temple was primarily a terracotta structure; the sides remained brick-faced, but the facade was covered with terracotta tiles. Stark vertical elements divided the three-story facade into five bay. A tall belt course, several feet high, separated the first-story doors from the second-story windows, while elaborate artwork was placed between the second- and third-story windows. Some elements of metalwork and stonework were placed for additional decoration. The basic design remained that of the original structure, although modified so thoroughly that its Neoclassical origins were no longer apparent.

In 1982, the former Eagles Temple was listed on the National Register of Historic Places, qualifying both because of its significant architecture and its place in local history. Another Register-listed building, the Akron Post Office and Federal Building, sits on the opposite side of Market Street. Although more than a quarter century has passed since the temple's demolition, it officially remains listed on the Register.
