= Eagles Building-Strand Theater =

- Eagles Building--Strand Theater
- U.S. National Register of Historic Places
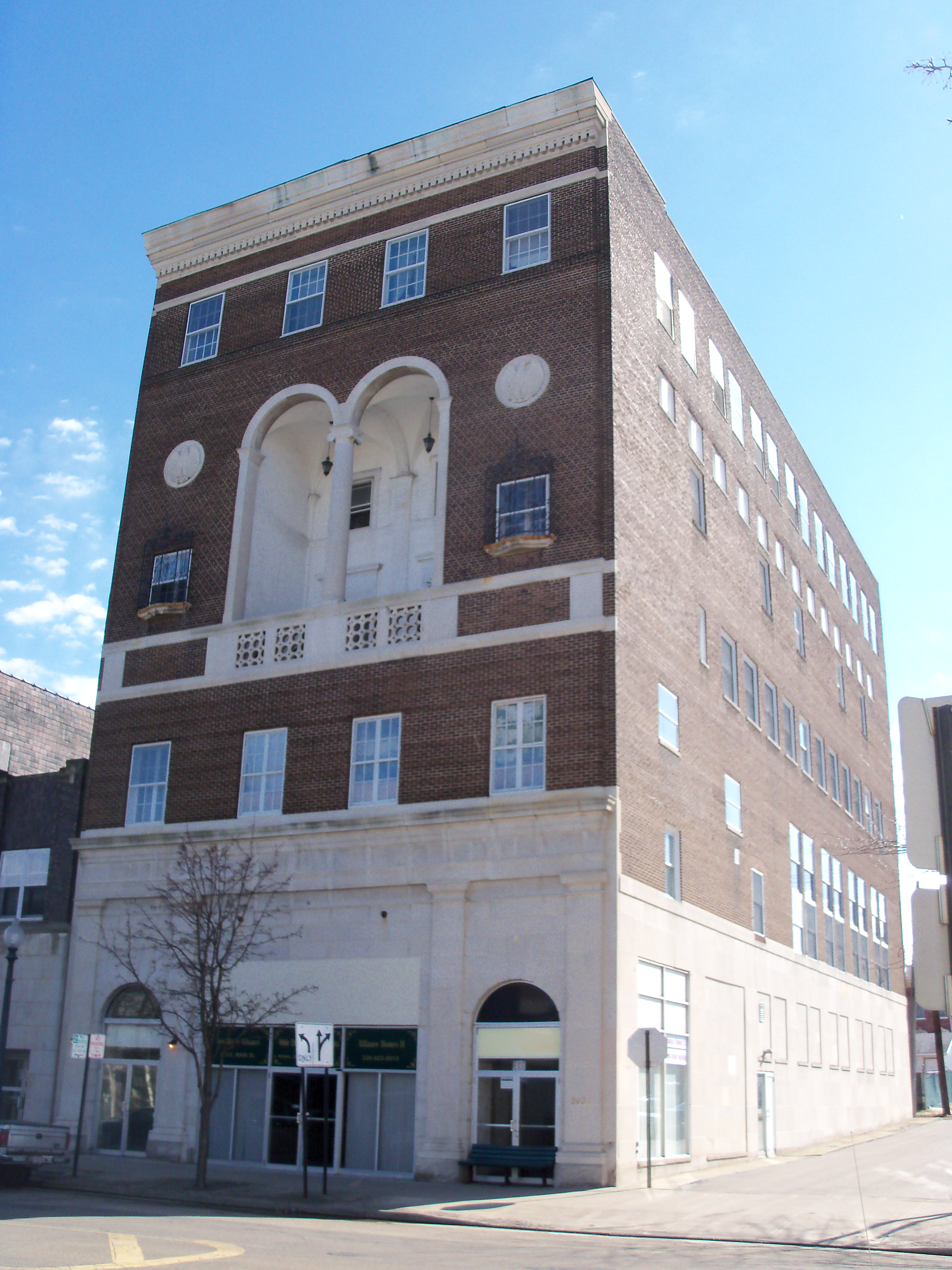

- Location within Ohio Location within the United States
- Location: 243 E. Main St., Alliance, Ohio
- Coordinates: 40°55′18″N 81°6′10″W
- Area: less than one acre
- Built: 1921
- Architectural style: Renaissance
- NRHP reference No.: 96001624
- Added to NRHP: January 25, 1997

The Eagles Building-Strand Theater is a building built in 1921 in Alliance, Ohio, also known as the Wallace Building. It historically served as a meeting hall and as a theater. It was listed on the National Register of Historic Places in 1997.

It opened as the Strand Theatre in May 1927, and it closed in 1960.
