= National Register of Historic Places listings in Taylor County, West Virginia =

Location of Taylor County in West Virginia

This is a list of the National Register of Historic Places listings in Taylor County, West Virginia.

This is intended to be a complete list of the properties and districts on the National Register of Historic Places in Taylor County, West Virginia, United States. The locations of National Register properties and districts for which the latitude and longitude coordinates are included below, may be seen in a Google map.

There are 6 properties and districts listed on the National Register in the county.

This National Park Service list is complete through NPS recent listings posted April 17, 2026.

Contents: Counties in West Virginia

Barbour - Berkeley - Boone - Braxton - Brooke - Cabell - Calhoun - Clay - Doddridge - Fayette - Gilmer - Grant - Greenbrier - Hampshire - Hancock - Hardy - Harrison - Jackson - Jefferson - Kanawha - Lewis - Lincoln - Logan - Marion - Marshall - Mason - McDowell - Mercer - Mineral - Mingo - Monongalia - Monroe - Morgan - Nicholas - Ohio - Pendleton - Pleasants - Pocahontas - Preston - Putnam - Raleigh - Randolph - Ritchie - Roane - Summers - Taylor - Tucker - Tyler - Upshur - Wayne - Webster - Wetzel - Wirt - Wood - Wyoming

== Current listings ==
	Name on the Register	Image	Date listed	Location	City or town	Description
1	Andrews Methodist Church	Andrews Methodist Church	December 18, 1970 (#70000667)	11 E. Main St. 39°20′27″N 80°01′07″W	Grafton	
2	Clelland House	Clelland House	June 23, 1980 (#80004043)	Off County Route 250/4; 39°23′38″N 80°09′10″W	Grafton	
3	Grafton Downtown Commercial Historic District	Grafton Downtown Commercial Historic District	April 9, 1984 (#84003675)	Main and Latrobe Sts. between Bridge and St. Mary's; 39°20′25″N 80°01′16″W	Grafton	
4	Grafton National Cemetery	Grafton National Cemetery	February 19, 1982 (#82004330)	431 Walnut St. 39°20′15″N 80°01′57″W	Grafton	
5	Anna Jarvis House	Anna Jarvis House	May 29, 1979 (#79002601)	U.S. Routes 119 and 250; 39°17′37″N 80°02′39″W	Webster	
6	Tygart River Reservoir Dam	Tygart River Reservoir Dam	June 23, 1995 (#95000763)	On the Tygart Valley River, 2.25 miles south of Grafton; 39°18′41″N 80°01′58″W	Grafton	

== See also ==
- List of National Historic Landmarks in West Virginia
- National Register of Historic Places listings in West Virginia
