= Ann Jarvis =

American activist (1832–1905)

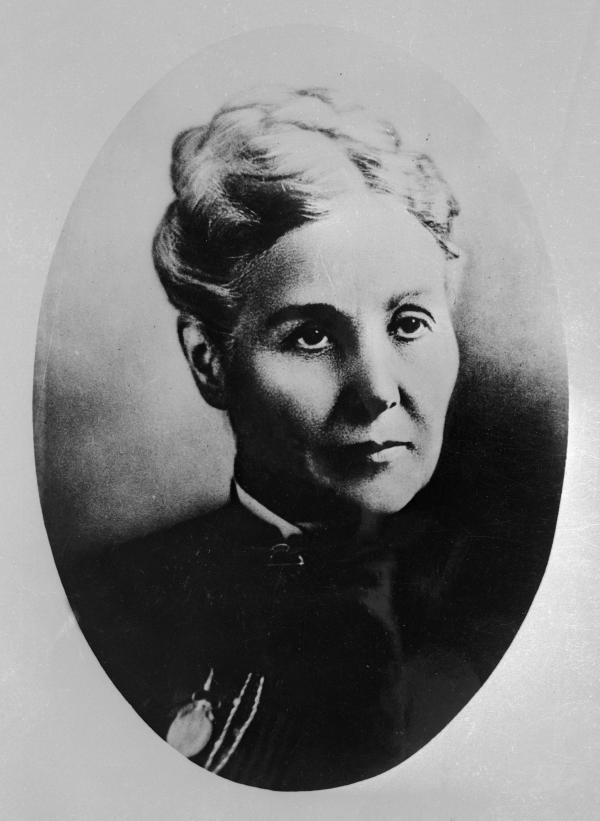
- Jarvis, c. 1930
- Born: Ann Maria Reeves; September 30, 1832; Culpeper, Virginia, U.S.
- Died: May 9, 1905 (aged 72); Philadelphia, Pennsylvania, U.S.
- Known for: social activism during the American Civil War; inspired Mother's Day

Ann Maria Reeves Jarvis (September 30, 1832 – May 9, 1905) was a social activist and community organizer during the American Civil War era. She is recognized as the mother who inspired Mother's Day and as a founder of Mother's Day movements, and her daughter, Anna Marie Jarvis (1864–1948), is recognized as the founder of the Mother's Day holiday in the United States.

== Biography ==
Ann Marie Reeves Jarvis was born in Culpeper, Virginia, on September 30, 1832, the daughter of Josiah Washington Reeves and Nancy Kemper Reeves. Jarvis moved to Philippi, Barbour County, (West) Virginia with her family when her father, a Methodist minister, was transferred to a church in that town. In 1850, she married Granville Jarvis, the son of a Baptist minister, who became a successful merchant in nearby Taylor County. Two years later, in 1852, the couple moved to Webster, where Granville established a mercantile business.

The Jarvis family, like many families during the mid-1800s, experienced frequent tragedy and loss. Jarvis bore between eleven and thirteen children over the course of seventeen years. Of these children, only four survived to adulthood. The others died of diseases such as measles, typhoid fever, and diphtheria, epidemics of which were common in Appalachian communities in Taylor County. These losses inspired Jarvis to take action to help her community combat childhood diseases and unsanitary conditions.

Jarvis was a dynamic woman who saw needs in her community and found ways to meet them. In 1858, while pregnant with her sixth child, Jarvis began Mothers' Day Work Clubs in the towns of Grafton, Pruntytown, Philippi, Fetterman, and Webster to improve health and sanitary conditions. She and other area women joined a growing public health movement in the United States. Jarvis' clubs sought to provide assistance and education to families in order to reduce disease and infant mortality. These clubs raised money to buy medicine and to hire women to work in families where the mother suffered from tuberculosis or other health problems. They developed programs to inspect milk long before there were state requirements. Club members visited households to educate mothers and their families about improving sanitation and overall health. The clubs benefited from the advice of Jarvis' brother, James Reeves, a physician who was known for his work in the typhoid fever epidemics in northwestern Virginia.

During the American Civil War (1861–1865), sentiment in western Virginia was sharply divided between north and south. In 1863, this culminated when the western part of the state broke away from Virginia and formed the new state of West Virginia, which was loyal to the Union. Western Virginia became the location of some of the first conflicts of the Civil War. Jarvis' Mothers' Day Work Clubs altered their mission to meet the changing demands brought about by war. Ann Jarvis urged the clubs to declare neutrality and to provide aid to both Confederate and Union soldiers. Jarvis illustrated her resolve to remain neutral and aid both sides by refusing to support a proposed division of the Methodist Church into a northern and southern branch. Additionally, she reportedly offered a lone prayer for Thornsbury Bailey Brown, the first Union soldier killed by a Confederate in the area, when others refused. Under her guidance, the clubs fed and clothed soldiers from both sides who were stationed in the area. When typhoid fever and measles broke out in the military camps, Jarvis and her club members nursed the suffering soldiers from both sides at the request of a commander.

Jarvis' efforts to keep the community together continued after the Civil War ended. After the fighting concluded, public officials seeking ways to eliminate post-war strife called on Jarvis to help. She and her club members planned a "Mothers Friendship Day" for soldiers from both sides and their families at the Taylor County Courthouse in Pruntytown to help the healing process. Despite threats of violence, Jarvis successfully staged the event in 1868. She shared with the veterans a message of unity and reconciliation. Bands played "Dixie" and the "Star Spangled Banner" and the event ended with everyone, north and south, joining to sing "Auld Lang Syne." This effective and emotional event reduced many to tears. It showed the community that old animosities were destructive and must end.

Near the end of the Civil War, in 1864, the Jarvis family moved to Grafton in order to aid Granville's business ventures as an innkeeper and land speculator. Jarvis continued her social activist work. Throughout her life, Jarvis taught Sunday School and was very involved with the Methodist church. In Grafton, Jarvis was involved in the Andrews Methodist Episcopal Church's construction and subsequently taught Sunday school classes there. She served as superintendent of the Primary Sunday School Department at the church for twenty-five years. Jarvis also was a popular speaker and often lectured on subjects ranging from religion, public health, and literature for audiences at local churches and organizations. Her lectures included, "Literature as a Source of Culture and Refinement", "Great Mothers of the Bible", "Great Value of Hygiene for Women and Children", and "The Importance of Supervised Recreational Centers for Boys and Girls".

Throughout her life, Jarvis strove to honor and help mothers. Her daughter Anna recalled her praying for someone to start a day to memorialize and honor mothers during a Sunday school lesson in 1876. On the first anniversary of Jarvis' death, Anna met with friends and announced plans for a memorial service remembering her mother for the next year. In May 1907, a private service was held in honor of Jarvis. The following year, in 1908, Anna organized the first official observance of Mother's Day, coming near the anniversary of her mother's death. Andrews Methodist Church held the first public service on the morning of May 10, 1908. Anna did not attend the service, but sent a donation of 500 white carnations for all of those in attendance. In the afternoon, 15,000 people attended another service that Anna organized in Philadelphia, held at the Wanamaker Store Auditorium.

In the years following the initial ceremonies, Anna's new holiday gained recognition in many states and spread to a number of foreign countries. Anna also embarked on a mission to make Mother's Day an officially recognized holiday in the United States. She succeeded when, in 1914, President Woodrow Wilson signed a congressional resolution officially making the second Sunday in May the national Mother's Day and calling for Americans to recognize it by displaying the flag.

== Death ==
Ann Jarvis remained in Grafton until after the death of her husband in 1902. After his death, Jarvis moved to Philadelphia to live near her sons and two daughters. Anna, her daughter, became her caretaker as her health steadily declined due to heart problems. Jarvis died in Philadelphia on May 8, 1905, surrounded by her four surviving children. She was buried in West Laurel Hill Cemetery in Philadelphia.

== See also ==
- Mother's Day (United States)
- International Mother's Day Shrine
