= West Virginia Memorial Day Parade =

- Nickname: Grafton Memorial Day Parade
- Status: Active
- Genre: Parade
- Date: Memorial Day
- Frequency: Annually
- Location: Grafton, West Virginia
- Country: United States
- Years active: 159
- Inaugurated: May 30, 1867
- Website: www.wvmemorialday.com

The West Virginia Memorial Day Parade, is an annual parade held in Grafton, West Virginia, and is the oldest running Memorial Day parade in the United States.

== History ==
Two years after the Civil War's end, in 1867, the town of Grafton held its first parade, as a Flower Strewing Day, on May 30, a small parade and ceremony to decorate Grafton National Cemetery with flowers. In 1882, the parade was named the Grafton Memorial Day Parade. It kept that name until 2018, when West Virginia adopted the parade as the official Memorial Day Parade.

== See also ==
- West Virginia in the American Civil War
