= West Virginia National Cemetery =

Veterans cemetery in Taylor County, West Virginia

Coordinates: 39°19′58″N 80°04′15″W

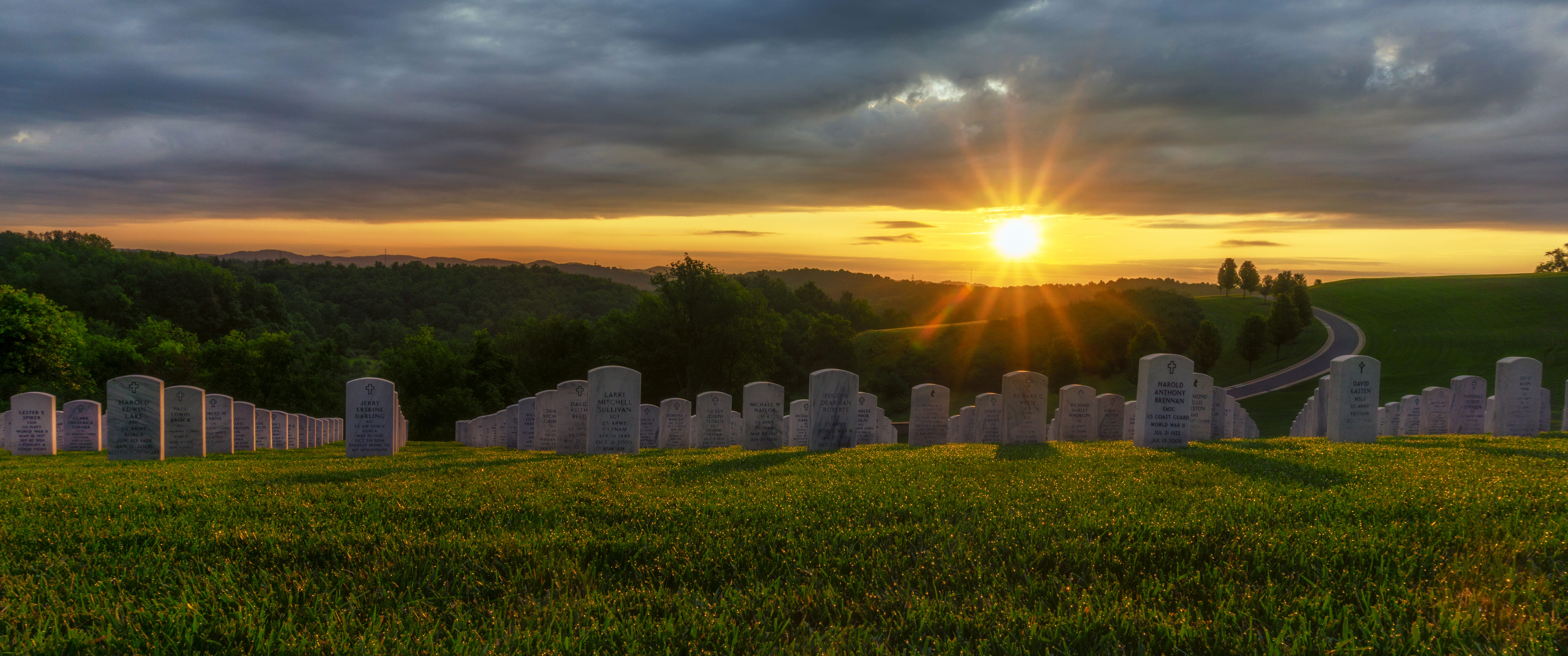
- Sunrise at West Virginia National Cemetery
- Interactive map of West Virginia National Cemetery

Details
- Location: Grafton, West Virginia
- Type: United States National cemetery
- Size: 89.7 acres (36.3 ha)

West Virginia National Cemetery is a United States National Cemetery located Grafton, Taylor County, West Virginia. It encompasses 89.7 acres (36.3 ha). Along with Grafton National Cemetery, it is one of the two national cemeteries in the state of West Virginia, both of which are located in Grafton. After it was determined that the 3 acres (1.2 ha) Grafton cemetery had inadequate space for new burials, West Virginia groups began petitioning for a new national cemetery for the state. The federal government appropriated the site of the former West Virginia Industrial Home for Boys for the new cemetery, which was dedicated and opened in 1987.

== History ==
By the 1960s the small, 3-acre (1.2 ha) Grafton National Cemetery had limited free space for new burials. A 1975 study of the cemetery determined that the remaining unused space was either too steep or too costly to use. West Virginia veteran groups such as the West Virginia United Veterans National Cemetery Committee campaigned state and federal government officials for a new national cemetery.

Negotiations between the United States Department of Veterans Affairs and the state resulted in the selection of a 58-acre (23 ha) site that was part of the West Virginia Industrial Home for Boys. Construction was delayed by work negotiations and poor weather conditions. A dedication ceremony took place on September 28, 1987 and the cemetery was opened for interments the next day, even though construction was incomplete.

The cemetery contains the Industrial School for Boys monument, a granite memorial erected in 1992 in memory of the residents of the West Virginia Industrial School for Boys who were buried at the cemetery between 1890 and 1939.

In 2010, the remains of World War II casualty Private First Class Lawrence Harris of Elkins, West Virginia were relocated to the National Cemetery after having been lost for 66 years. Harris and two other American soldiers—Corporal Judge C. Hellums and Private Donald D. Owens—were killed on October 9, 1944 when their M10 tank destroyer was destroyed by an explosion in France. The soldiers' remains were identified at the time of the incident, but after the war Army Graves Registration Service members were unable to locate the remains. In 1947, the three men were declared dead and their remains unrecoverable by a military board. The board was unaware that an Army group had removed the remains and had them buried unidentified at Ardennes American Cemetery in Belgium. After an ID bracelet was recovered from the site in 2003, investigations between 2006 and 2008 led to the graves being exhumed for DNA testing. The three soldiers were and Harris' remains were re-interred at the National Cemetery in his home state.

== Notable burials ==
- Sarah Beckstrom (2005-2025) – Victim of the 2025 Washington, D.C., National Guard shooting
- Frank Gatski (1921–2005) – United States Army Private First Class in World War II and Hall of Fame professional football player
- Roy Earl Parrish (1888–1918) – West Virginia state senator and United States Army second lieutenant in World War I (cenotaph)
