= Mother's Day (United States) =

Holiday in the United States

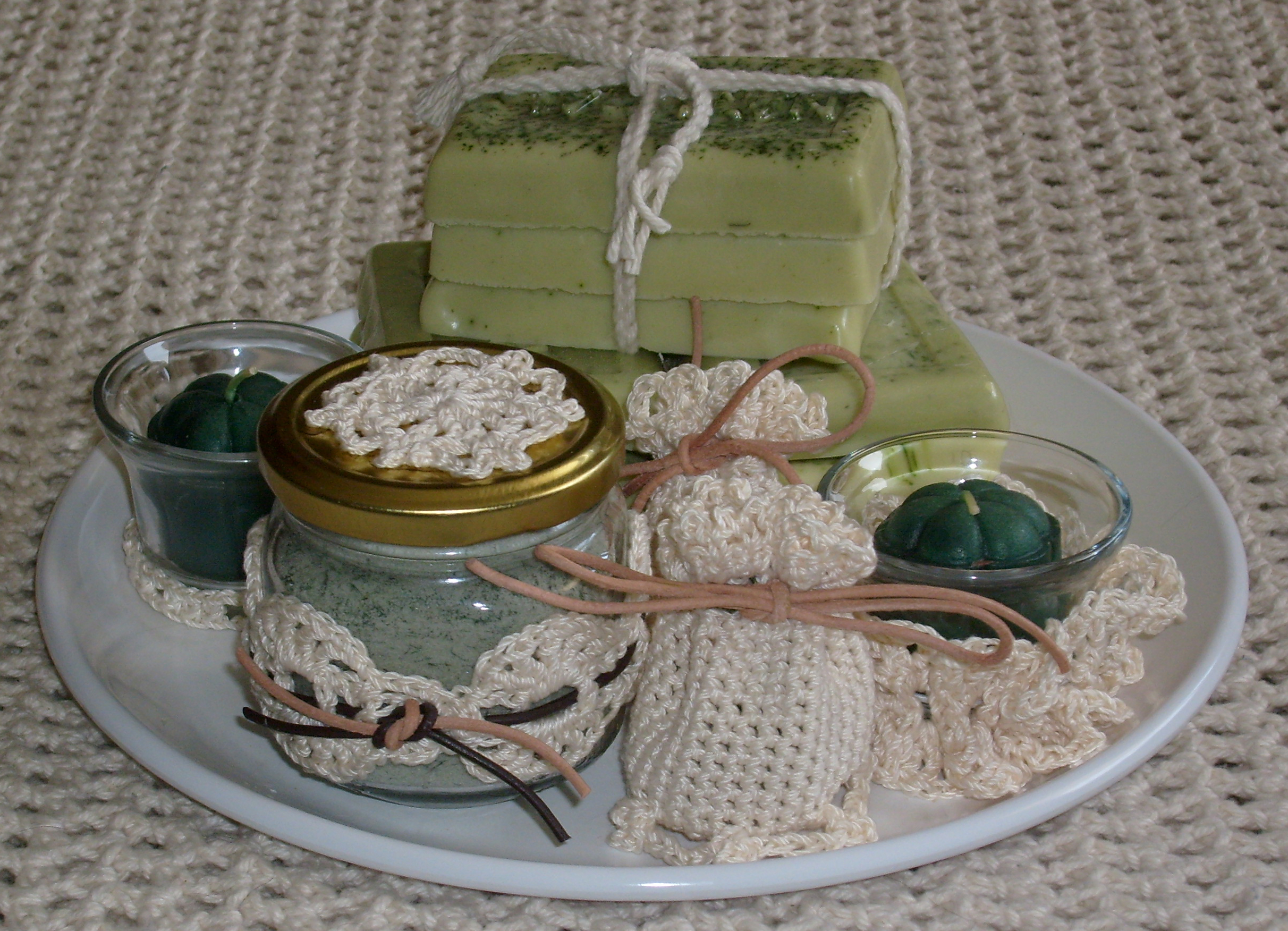
- Examples of handmade Mother's Day gifts
- Observed by: United States, Canada
- Type: Commercial, cultural, religious
- Observances: Holiday card and gift giving, churchgoing accompanied by the distribution of carnations, and family dinners
- Date: Second Sunday in May
- 2025 date: May 11
- 2026 date: May 10
- 2027 date: May 9
- 2028 date: May 14
- Frequency: Annual
- Related to: Father's Day

Mother's Day is an annual holiday celebrated in the United States and, since 1914, in Canada on the second Sunday in May. Mother's Day recognizes mothers, motherhood and maternal bonds in general, as well as their positive contributions to their families and society. It was established by Anna Jarvis, with the first Mother's Day celebrated through a service of worship at St. Andrew's Methodist Church in Grafton, West Virginia, on May 10, 1908. Popular observances include holiday card and gift giving, churchgoing often accompanied by the distribution of carnations, and family dinners. In the United States, Mother's Day complements similar celebrations honoring family members, such as Father's Day, Siblings Day and Grandparents Day.

Internationally, many Mother's Day celebrations have different origins and traditions, some also influenced by this more recent American tradition. For the international celebration, see Mother's Day.

== History ==
=== First attempts to establish a holiday ===
During the 19th century, women's peace groups in the United States tried establishing holidays and regular activities in favor of peace and against war. A common early activity was the meeting of groups of mothers whose sons had fought or died on opposite sides of the American Civil War.

In 1868, Ann Jarvis, Anna Jarvis's mother, organized a committee to establish a "Mother's Friendship Day", the purpose of which was "to reunite families that had been divided during the Civil War." Ann Jarvis, who had previously organized Mother's Day Work Clubs to improve sanitation and health for both Union and Confederate encampments undergoing a typhoid outbreak, wanted to expand these into an annual memorial for mothers, but she died in 1905 before the annual celebration was established. Her daughter would continue her mother's efforts.

There were several limited observances in the 1870s and the 1880s. Still, none achieved resonance beyond the local level. At the time, Protestant schools in the United States already held many celebrations and observations such as Children's Day, Temperance Sunday, Roll Call Day, Decision Day, Missionary Day and others. In New York City, Julia Ward Howe led a "Mother's Day for Peace" anti-war observance on June 2, 1872, which was accompanied by an "Appeal to womanhood throughout the world" (nowadays known as Mother's Day Proclamation). The observance continued in Boston for about ten years under Howe's sponsorship, then died out. In these celebrations, mothers all around the world would work towards world peace.

Several years later, a Mother's Day observance on May 13, 1877, was held in Albion, Michigan over a dispute related to the temperance movement. According to local legend, Albion pioneer Juliet Calhoun Blakeley stepped up to complete the sermon of the Rev. Myron Daughterty who was distraught because an anti-temperance group had forced his son and two other temperance advocates at gunpoint to spend the night in a saloon and become publicly drunk. From the pulpit, Blakeley called on other mothers to join her. Blakeley's two sons, both traveling salesmen, were so moved that they vowed to return each year to pay tribute to her and embarked on a campaign to urge their business contacts to do likewise. At their urging, in the early 1880s, the Methodist Episcopal Church in Albion set aside the second Sunday in May to recognize the special contributions of mothers.

Frank E. Hering, alumnus and administrator at the University of Notre Dame and President of the Fraternal Order of Eagles, made a plea for "setting aside one day in the year as a nationwide memorial to the memories of Mothers and motherhood" in 1904. After observing a class of Notre Dame students sending home penny postcards to their mothers, Hering went on to be a vocal advocate for a national Mother's Day for the next decade. As Hering stated in a 1941 issue of Scholastic: "Throughout history the great men of the world have given their credit for their achievements to their mothers. [The] Holy Church recognizes this, as does Notre Dame especially, and Our Lady who watches over our great institution."

=== Establishment of holiday ===
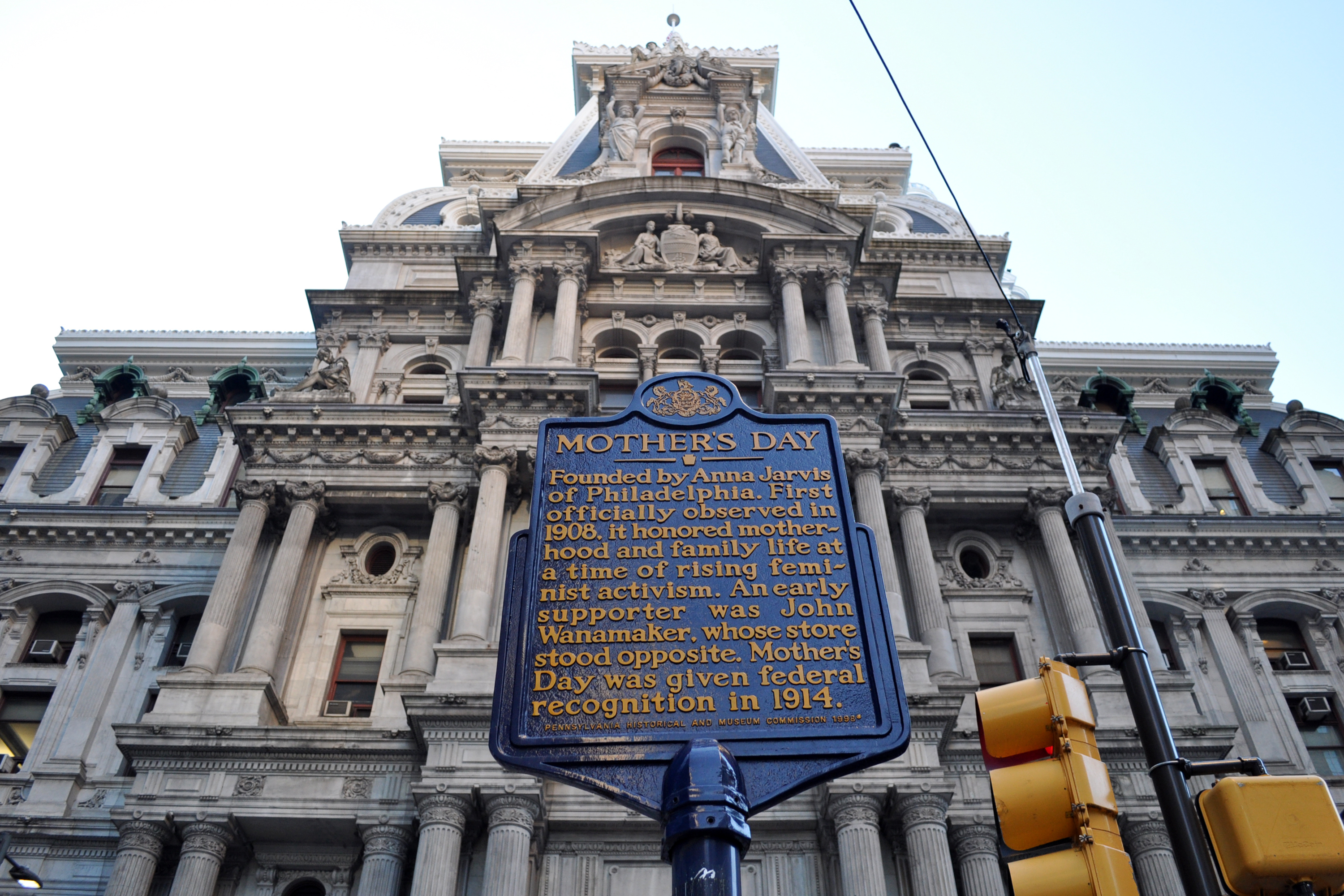
Mother's Day Historical Marker at Market and N. Juniper Sts. Philadelphia PA

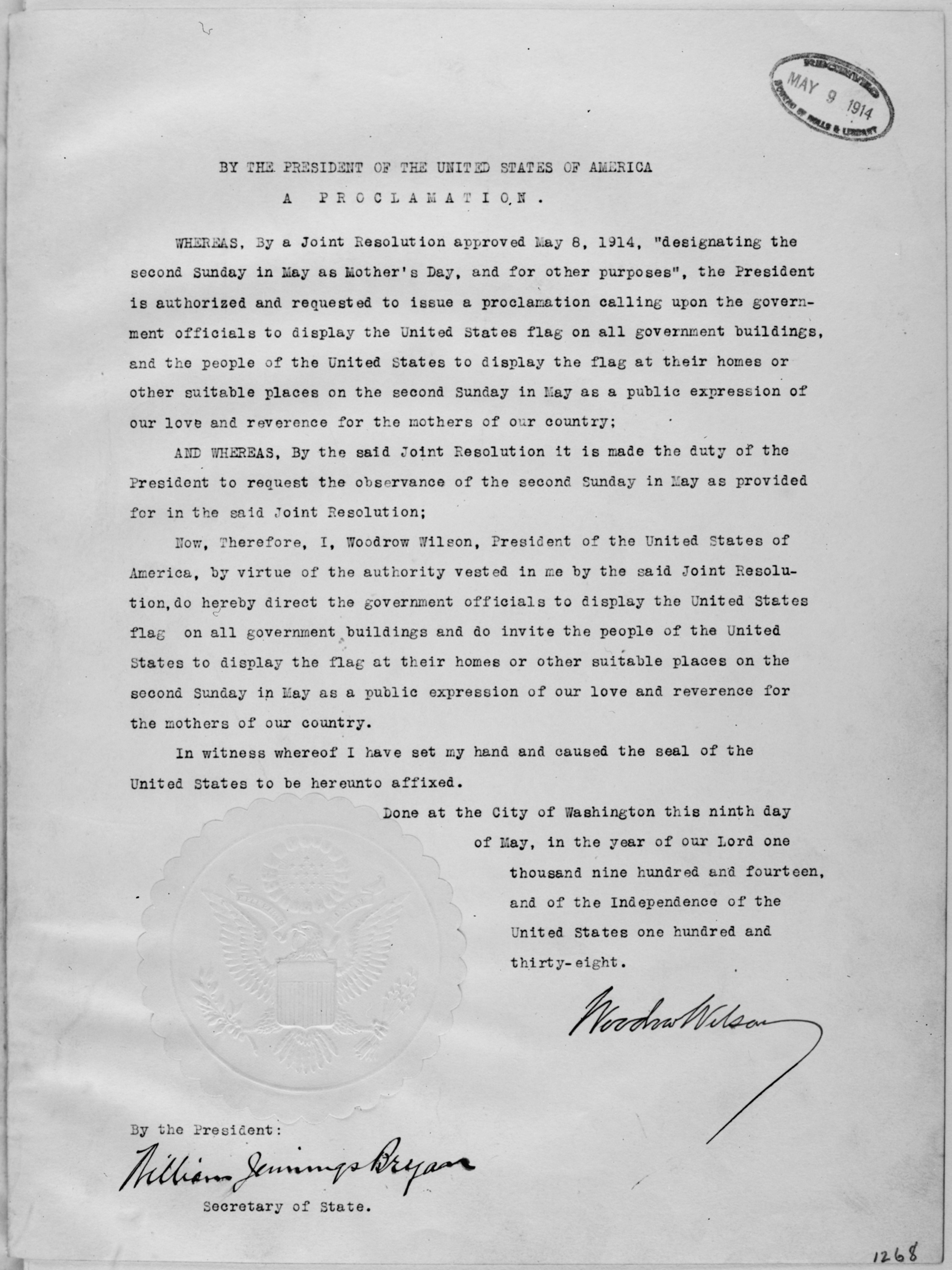
President Wilson's Mother's Day Proclamation of May 9, 1914

In its present form, Mother's Day was established by Anna Jarvis with the help of Philadelphia merchant John Wanamaker following the death of her mother, Ann Jarvis, on May 9, 1905. Jarvis never mentioned Howe or Mothering Sunday, and she never mentioned any connection to the Protestant school celebrations, always claiming that the creation of Mother's Day was hers alone.

A small service was held on May 12, 1907, in the Andrew's Methodist Episcopal Church in Grafton, West Virginia, where Anna's mother had been teaching Sunday school. The first "official" service of worship was on May 10, 1908, in the same church, accompanied by a larger ceremony in the Wanamaker Auditorium in the Wanamaker's store in Philadelphia. The next year the day was reported to be widely celebrated in New York.

Jarvis then campaigned to establish Mother's Day first as a U.S. national holiday and then later as an international holiday. The holiday was declared officially by the state of West Virginia in 1910, and the rest of the states followed quickly.

On May 10, 1913, the U.S. House of Representatives passed a resolution calling on all federal government officials (from the president down) to wear a white carnation the following day in observance of Mother's Day. On May 8, 1914, the U.S. Congress passed a law designating the second Sunday in May as Mother's Day and requesting a proclamation. The next day, President Woodrow Wilson issued a proclamation declaring the first official Mother's Day as a day for American citizens to show the flag in honor of those mothers whose sons had died in war. In 1934, President Franklin D. Roosevelt approved a stamp commemorating the holiday.

In May 2008, the House of Representatives voted twice on a resolution commemorating Mother's Day, the first one being passed without a dissenting vote (21 members not voting). The Saint Andrews Methodist Church, where the first celebration was held, is now the International Mother's Day Shrine and is a National Historic Landmark.

== Spelling ==
In 1912 Anna Jarvis trademarked the phrases "Second Sunday in May" and "Mother's Day", and created the Mother's Day International Association. She specifically noted that "Mother's" should "be a singular possessive, for each family to honor its own mother, not a plural possessive commemorating all mothers in the world." This is also the spelling used by President Woodrow Wilson in his 1914 presidential proclamation, by the Congress in relevant bills, and by various presidents in their proclamations concerning Mother's Day.

== Traditions ==
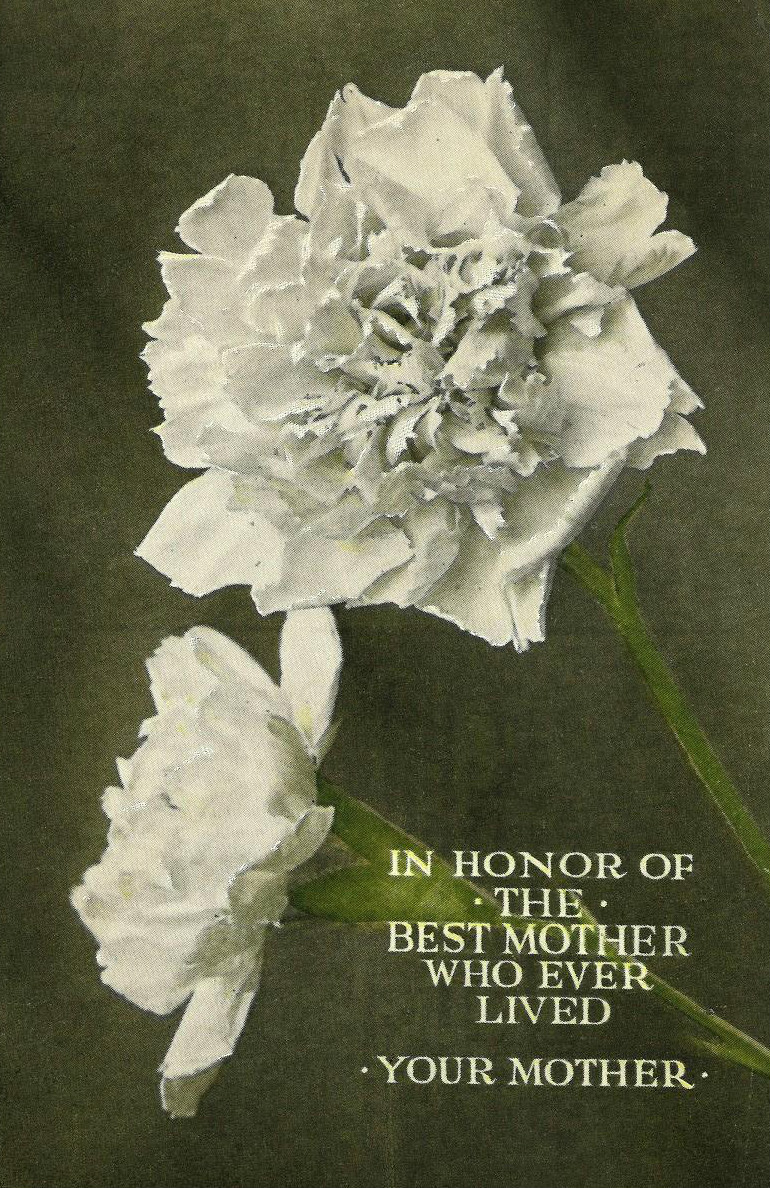
Mother's Day 1915 postcard from Northern Pacific Railway

Traditions on Mother's Day include churchgoing, the distribution of carnations, and family dinners. Mother's Day is the third largest holiday in the United States for sending cards. According to the greeting card industry, it is estimated that more than 50 percent of American households send greeting cards on this holiday. The holiday has been heavily commercialized by advertisers and retailers, and has been criticized by some as a Hallmark Holiday.

=== Carnations ===
Carnations are often worn on special occasions, especially Mother's Day and weddings. In 1907, Anna Jarvis chose a carnation as the emblem of Mother's Day because it was her mother's favourite flower. This tradition is now observed in the United States and Canada on the second Sunday in May. Jarvis chose the white carnation because she wanted to represent the purity of a mother's love. Carnations have come to represent Mother's Day since Anna Jarvis delivered 500 at the first celebration in 1908. Many religious services held later adopted the custom of giving away carnations. This also started the custom of wearing a carnation on Mother's Day. The founder, Anna Jarvis, chose the carnation because it was her mother's favorite flower. In part due to the shortage of white carnations, and in part due to the efforts to expand the sales of more types of flowers in Mother's Day, florists invented the idea of wearing a pink carnation if your mother was living, or a white one if she was dead; this was tirelessly promoted until it made its way into the popular observations at churches. Other less traditional flower options may include roses, a live blooming plant, flower leis, or a bouquet of a variety of different flowers.

=== Commercialization ===
The commercialization of U.S. holidays began very early. Only nine years after the first official Mother's Day, it had become so rampant that Anna Jarvis herself became a prominent opponent of what the holiday had become, spending all her inheritance and the rest of her life fighting what she saw as an abuse of the celebration. She decried the practice of purchasing greeting cards, which she saw as a sign of being too lazy to write a personal letter. She was arrested in 1948 for disturbing the peace while protesting against the commercialization of Mother's Day, and she finally said that she "...wished she would have never started the day because it became so out of control ..." She died later that year.

Mother's Day is now one of the most commercially successful American occasions, having become the most popular day of the year to dine out at a restaurant in the United States and generating a significant portion of the U.S. jewelry industry's annual revenue, from custom gifts like mother's rings. Americans spend approximately $2.6 billion on flowers, $1.53 billion on pampering gifts—like spa treatments—and another $68 million on greeting cards.

It has been suggested that commercialization has ensured that the holiday has continued. In contrast, other holidays from the same time, such as Children's Day and Temperance Sunday, are no longer celebrated.

=== Sports ===
From 2005 to 2013, the Southern 500 auto race at Darlington Raceway was held on Saturday of Mother's Day weekend. From 2014 to 2019, the NASCAR Cup Series hosted the Digital Ally 400 at Kansas Speedway on Saturday of Mother's Day weekend. In 2020, the Blue-Emu Maximum Pain Relief 500 at Martinsville Speedway was scheduled to take place on the Saturday of Mother's Day weekend (although that race was postponed until June). In 2021, the Goodyear 400 auto race at Darlington Raceway occurred on Mother's Day and served as NASCAR's throwback race. Also, the IndyCar Grand Prix has been held on Saturday of Mother's Day weekend since 2014.

From 2007–2018, The Players Championship men's golf tournament was held on Mother's Day weekend, except in 2011 and 2014 when May 1 fell on a Sunday. In those cases, it was held the following weekend. Previously, the Kingsmill Championship women's golf tournament was played on Mother's Day weekend from 2004 to 2009.

Professional sports players often wear pink clothing accessories on Mother's Day weekend.

== See also ==
- Father's Day
- Mōdraniht
- National Grandparents Day
