= Anna Jarvis =

Founder of Mother's Day (1864-1948)

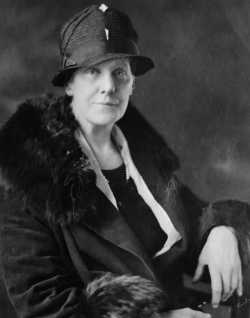
- Born: Anna Maria Jarvis; May 1, 1864; Webster, Taylor County, West Virginia, U.S.
- Died: November 24, 1948 (aged 84); West Chester, Pennsylvania, U.S.
- Resting place: West Laurel Hill Cemetery, Bala Cynwyd, Pennsylvania, U.S.
- Known for: Founder of American Mother's Day

Anna Maria Jarvis (May 1, 1864 – November 24, 1948) was the founder of Mother's Day in the United States. Her mother had frequently expressed a desire to establish such a holiday, and after her mother's death, Jarvis led the movement for the commemoration. However, as the years passed, Jarvis grew disenchanted with the growing commercialization of the observation and even attempted to have Mother's Day rescinded. By the early 1940s, she had become infirm, and was placed in a sanatorium by friends and associates where she died on November 24, 1948. A legend exists that a portion of her medical bills were paid for by florists.

== Family and early life ==
Anna Maria Jarvis was born to Granville E. and Ann Maria (née Reeves) Jarvis on May 1, 1864, in Webster, Taylor County, West Virginia, the ninth of eleven children. Seven of her siblings died in infancy or early childhood. Her birthplace, today known as the Anna Jarvis House, has been listed on the National Register of Historic Places since 1979. The family moved to Grafton, West Virginia, also in Taylor County, later in her childhood.

Ann Reeves Jarvis was a social activist and founder of Mothers' Day Work Clubs. As a woman defined by her faith, she was very active within the Andrews Methodist Episcopal Church community. It was during one of her Sunday school lessons in 1876 that her daughter, Anna Jarvis, allegedly found her inspiration for Mother's Day, as Ann closed her lesson with a prayer, stating:

I hope and pray that someone, sometime, will found a memorial mothers day commemorating her for the matchless service she renders to humanity in every field of life. She is entitled to it.

— Ann Reeves Jarvis

With the encouragement of her mother, Anna Jarvis attended college. She was awarded a diploma for the completion of two years of coursework at the Augusta Female Seminary in Staunton, Virginia, today known as Mary Baldwin University. Jarvis returned to Grafton to work in the public school system, additionally joining her mother as an active church member, maintaining a close link to her mother.

After her uncle, Dr. James Edmund Reeves, persuaded her to move to Chattanooga, Tennessee, Jarvis worked there as a bank teller for a year. The following year, Jarvis again moved, this time to live with her brother in Philadelphia, Pennsylvania, despite her mother's urging to return to Grafton. Jarvis was successful in Philadelphia, taking a position at Fidelity Mutual Life Insurance Company, where she became the agency's first female literary and advertising editor. Another accomplishment was becoming a shareholder in the Quaker City Cab Company, her brother's business.

While away from Grafton, Anna Jarvis maintained close correspondence with her mother. Ann Reeves Jarvis was proud of her daughter's achievements, and the letters kept mother and daughter closely linked. After the death of Jarvis's father, Granville, in 1902, she urged her mother to move to Philadelphia to stay with her and her brother. Both brother and sister worried about their mother's health, and Ann Reeves Jarvis ultimately agreed to move to Philadelphia in 1904 when her heart problems necessitated it. Jarvis spent most of her time caring for her mother as Ann Reeves Jarvis's health declined. She died on May 9, 1905.

== Movement towards Mother's Day ==
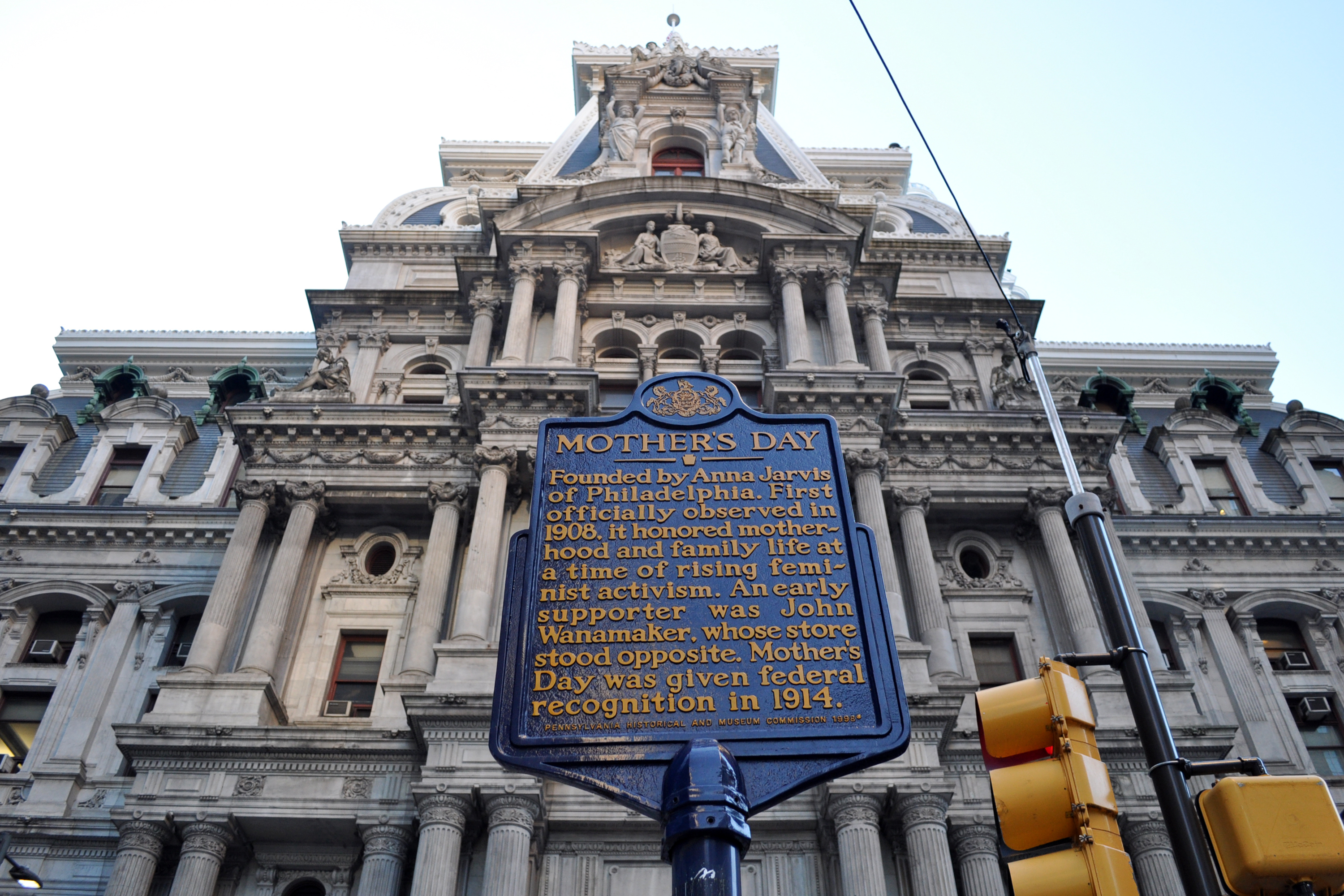
Mother's Day Historical Marker at Market and N. Juniper Sts. Philadelphia, Pennsylvania

On May 10, 1908, three years after her mother's death, Jarvis held a memorial ceremony to honor her mother and all mothers at Andrews Methodist Episcopal Church, today the International Mother's Day Shrine, in Grafton, West Virginia, marking the first official observance of Mother's Day. The International Mother's Day Shrine has been a designated National Historic Landmark since October 5, 1992.

Although Jarvis did not attend this service, she sent a telegram describing the significance of the day and five hundred white carnations for all who attended the service. As she spoke in Philadelphia at the Wanamaker's Store Auditorium, she moved her audience with the power of her speech.

In the ensuing years, Anna Jarvis embarked upon a campaign to make "Mother's Day" a recognized holiday. She spent a significant amount of time writing to countless business executives, church groups, and politicians at the state and national level to promote the commemorative day. Jarvis was singularly dedicated throughout this process, resigning her position at Fidelity Mutual and incorporating the Mother’s Day International Association (MDIA) in 1912 to encourage national and international recognition of the day. During her campaign, the holiday spread throughout every U.S. state and numerous foreign countries, including Canada, Mexico, China, Japan, and throughout South America and Africa. After her persistent efforts, Mother’s Day was finally proclaimed a national holiday in 1914 by President Woodrow Wilson.

== Commercialization, conflict, and later life ==
Although the national proclamation represented a public validation of her efforts, Jarvis always believed herself to be the leader of the commemorative day. She, therefore, maintained her established belief in the sentimental significance of the day to honor all mothers and motherhood. Jarvis valued the symbolism of such tangible items as the white carnation emblem, which she described as:

Its whiteness is to symbolize the truth, purity and broad-charity of mother love; its fragrance, her memory, and her prayers. The carnation does not drop its petals, but hugs them to its heart as it dies, and so, too, mothers hug their children to their hearts, their mother love never dying. When I selected this flower, I was remembering my mother's bed of white pinks.

Jarvis frequently referred to her mother's memory during her efforts to maintain the sentimental heart of the day while also maintaining her role as the founder of the holiday. In addition to her efforts to maintain her position and recognition as the holiday's founder, Jarvis struggled against forces of commercialization that overwhelmed her original message. Among some of these forces were the confection, floral, and greeting card industries. The symbols she valued for their sentimentality, such as the white carnation, easily became commodified and commercialized.

By the 1920s, as the floral industry continued increasing prices of white carnations and then introduced red carnations to meet the demand for the flower, Anna Jarvis's original symbols began to become re-appropriated, such as the red carnation representing living mothers and the white carnation honoring deceased mothers. She attempted to counter these commercial forces, creating a badge with a Mother's Day emblem as a less ephemeral alternative to the white carnation.

A printed card means nothing except that you are too lazy to write to the woman who has done more for you than anyone in the world. And candy! You take a box to Mother—and then eat most of it yourself. A pretty sentiment.

However, her efforts to hold on to the day's original meaning led to her own economic hardship. While others profited from the day, Jarvis did not, and she spent the later years of her life with her sister Lillie. In 1943, she began organizing a petition to rescind Mother's Day. However, these efforts were halted when she was placed in the Marshall Square Sanitarium in West Chester, Pennsylvania. People connected with the floral and greeting card industries paid the bills to keep her in the sanitarium.

Jarvis died on November 24, 1948, and was buried next to her mother, sister, and brother at West Laurel Hill Cemetery in Bala Cynwyd, Pennsylvania. Although the Anna M. Jarvis Committee supported her and helped to continue her movement during her declining health, it ultimately disbanded with the assurance that the Jarvis family gravesite would remain under the care of her grandniece who was the only heir to the estate, her second oldest brother's granddaughter, as she never married or had any children.

== See also ==
- International Mother's Day Shrine
