= Grafton Downtown Commercial Historic District =

Historic district in West Virginia, United States

- U.S. National Register of Historic Places
- U.S. Historic district
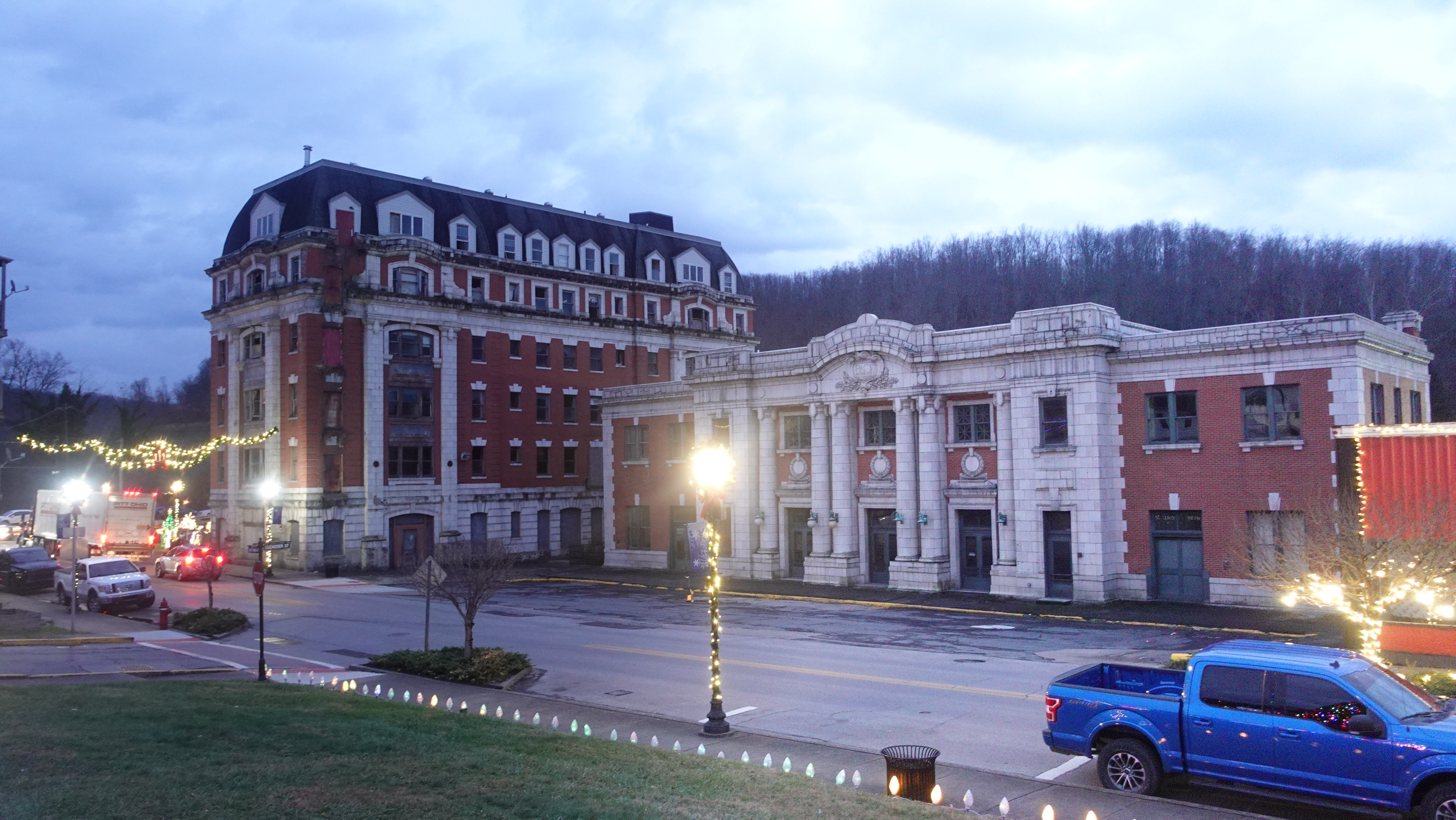
- Street view of Grafton Hotel & Grafton B&O Depot in 2023.

- Location within West Virginia Location within the United States
- Location: Main and Latrobe Sts. between Bridge and St. Mary's, Grafton, West Virginia
- Coordinates: 39°20′25″N 80°1′16″W
- Area: 25 acres (10 ha)
- Built: 1856
- Architect: Multiple
- Architectural style: Early Commercial, Beaux-Arts, Italianate
- NRHP reference No.: 84003675
- Added to NRHP: April 9, 1984

Grafton Downtown Commercial Historic District is a national historic district located at Grafton, Taylor County, West Virginia. It encompasses 72 contributing buildings and two contributing structures. They include the business and commercial core of Grafton. Most of the buildings in the district date from 1890–1920 and are generally of brick or frame construction. Notable buildings include the Grafton Hotel and the B & O station, both built in 1911 and the Post Office built in 1913. Located in the district and separately listed is the Andrews Methodist Church.

It was listed on the National Register of Historic Places in 1984.
