= Webster, West Virginia =

Webster
- Unincorporated community
- Location of Webster in West Virginia Webster (the United States)
- Coordinates: 39°17′48″N 80°2′43″W
- Country: United States
- State: West Virginia
- County: Taylor
- Elevation: 1,030 ft (310 m)
- Time zone: UTC-5 (Eastern (EST))
  - Summer (DST): UTC-4 (EDT)
- GNIS feature ID: 1548873

Webster is an unincorporated community in Taylor County, West Virginia. It lies four miles south of Grafton. Its elevation is 1,019 feet above sea level.

== History ==
Webster became a junction on the Baltimore and Ohio Railroad in 1854. Webster was the location of a Union encampment during the American Civil War. It was the birthplace of Anna Marie Jarvis, the founder of Mother's Day as a national holiday in the United States. Her birthplace, known as the Anna Jarvis House, was listed on the National Register of Historic Places in 1979.

The village of Webster should not be confused with Webster County, West Virginia or its county seat, Webster Springs.
