= Fetterman, West Virginia =

Unincorporated community in West Virginia, United States

Fetterman
- Unincorporated community
- Location within the state of West Virginia Fetterman (the United States)
- Coordinates: 39°20′58″N 80°2′17″W
- Country: United States
- State: West Virginia
- County: Taylor
- Elevation: 1,024 ft (312 m)
- Time zone: UTC-5 (Eastern (EST))
  - Summer (DST): UTC-4 (EDT)
- GNIS ID: 1538943

Fetterman is an unincorporated community or populated place located in Taylor County, West Virginia, United States. It is coterminous with Ward 1 of the city of Grafton.

The elevation of Fetterman is 1,024 feet (312 m) and it appears on the Grafton USGS Map. Taylor County is in the Eastern time zone (UTC-5) and in postal zip code 26354. Fetterman was one of the early settlements in what became Taylor County, Virginia (later West Virginia). It was originally located at the crossing of the Tygart Valley River by a covered bridge built for the Northwestern Turnpike in the 1830s.

== History ==
The original community of "Valley Bridge" grew up around the old covered bridge built over the Tygart in 1834 as part of the Northwestern Turnpike. The settlement formally became Fetterman in 1854, two years after the B&O Railroad arrived to the region. (The new name derived from a resident of Pittsburgh who then owned the town site.) The old covered bridge itself served the community until 1888 when it was swept away in the massive flood of that year.

=== American Civil War ===
In the early days of the American Civil War, before Virginia had completed the process of secession from the Union, Virginia formed a state army and navy under the command of Virginia Major General Robert E. Lee. Lee sent Colonel George A. Porterfield to Grafton, Virginia to organize and recruit new members for the secessionist forces for the state, with a view toward joining the Confederacy, to hold northwestern Virginia for Virginia and ultimately the Confederacy. Porterfield also was ordered to hold and protect the Baltimore and Ohio Railroad, but to destroy bridges to impede Union forces if it could not be held. Porterfield found that sympathies at Grafton were largely with the Union and the Grafton Guards under Captain George R. Latham were organized at Grafton. Porterfield moved to nearby Fetterman and began to gather a company from the area, the Letcher Guard or Letcher's Guard, and companies that supported the Confederacy from other locations in the region. Porterfield's men briefly held Grafton when the Grafton Guards went to Wheeling, Virginia to be mustered into the Union Army on May 25, 1861.

A few days later, Porterfield learned that larger Union forces were moving toward Grafton and he withdrew to Philippi in Barbour County, about 30 miles (48 km) to the south of Grafton. At about dawn on June 3, 1861, the larger Union force surprised the Confederates under Porterfield's command, who were mostly still asleep in their tents, and routed them, with only a few men wounded on both sides and about five prisoners taken by the Union force, in the Battle of Philippi, soon called the Philippi Races due to the hasty retreat of the Confederate force.

Thornsbury Bailey Brown of Taylor County, Virginia (now West Virginia) is generally considered the first Union soldier killed by a Confederate soldier during the American Civil War. Brown was a member of a Virginia militia company, the Grafton Guards, which supported the Union. He was killed by a member of a Virginia militia company which supported the Confederacy from the same general vicinity, the Letcher Guard, at the bridge at the intersection of the Northwestern Turnpike and the Baltimore and Ohio Railroad at Fetterman, Virginia (now West Virginia) on May 22, 1861.

=== Later inclusion with Grafton ===
Fetterman has been absorbed by the expansion of Grafton. It is considered a populated location within the incorporated place of Grafton, now constituting Ward 1 of the city. Grafton is an incorporated place located in Taylor County, West Virginia at latitude 39.341 and longitude -80.019.
