= Thornsbury Bailey Brown =

- Born: May 15, 1829
- Died: May 22, 1861 (aged 32); Fetterman, West Virginia
- Burial place: Grafton National Cemetery; Grafton, West Virginia
- Military career
- Allegiance: United States of America; Union
- Branch: Grafton Guards militia (Union Army)
- Service years: 1861
- Rank: Private
- Conflicts: American Civil War

Thornsbury Bailey Brown (May 15, 1829 – May 22, 1861) of Taylor County, Virginia (now West Virginia), is generally considered the first Union soldier killed by a Confederate soldier during the American Civil War. Brown, a member of a Virginia militia or volunteer company which supported the Union with the grade of private, was killed by a member of a Virginia militia or volunteer company which supported the Confederacy at Fetterman, Virginia (now West Virginia) on May 22, 1861. The members of both companies were from the same general vicinity of Taylor County.

== Death ==
On May 22, 1861, two members of the Grafton Guards, Lieutenant Daniel Wilson and Private Thornsbury Bailey Brown went from Grafton, Virginia, to a rally in Pruntytown, Virginia, to recruit men for the Union army. When they returned that evening, they encountered three members of a Virginia militia company with Confederate sympathies, George E. Glenn, Daniel W. S. Knight, and William Reese of the Letcher Guards, who were on picket duty at the Fetterman Bridge. The Letcher Guards would become a company of the Confederate 25th Virginia Infantry Regiment. The bridge was located at the crossing of the Northwestern Turnpike with the tracks of the Baltimore and Ohio Railroad. The pickets ordered Wilson and Brown to halt. Brown responded, possibly at Wilson's order to test the Confederates, by firing his pistol. The shot injured Knight's ear. Knight, and perhaps his two companions, then fired at Brown and killed him. According to the official and more generally accepted story, T. Bailey Brown thus became the first Union combat death of the American Civil War, or perhaps more precisely, the first Union soldier to be killed by a Confederate soldier during the Civil War.

== Other early deaths of Union soldiers ==
At the Fort Sumter surrender ceremony, on April 14, 1861, Union Private Daniel Hough was killed and Private Edward Galloway was mortally wounded when a Union cannon or shells near the cannon accidentally exploded while the Union garrison was giving a cannon fire salute to the American flag. These deaths were accidents, however, and were not due to enemy fire. The famous death of the first Union Army officer to be killed during the war, Union Colonel Elmer E. Ellsworth, who was killed at Alexandria, Virginia while taking down a secessionist flag by hotel owner James W. Jackson, who was a Confederate sympathizer, occurred two days later than the incident in which Brown was killed, May 24, 1861. Assuming the incident at Fetterman was not a battle, the first Union soldier to be killed in battle was a Private Saintclair of the 2d U.S. Cavalry Regiment who was killed at the Battle of Fairfax Court House (June 1861) on June 1, 1861. The web site of a Civil War re-enactor group states with respect to the picket duty performed by the regiment in the early days of the war, and obviously with reference to the Battle of Arlington Mills, also on June 1, 1861: "21-year-old Henry S. Cornell of Company G, a member of Engine Co. 13, was killed and another man wounded one night on the picket line." Eighteen Union soldiers were killed at the Battle of Big Bethel on June 10, 1861.

== Questions about combat status ==
At least two accounts add an aspect to the story of Brown's death which has raised questions about its combat status or even whether it was war related. The first account states that at an earlier date Brown had turned Knight over to the sheriff for stealing a cow. This may suggest a personal motive for the shooting and call into question whether Knight's killing of Brown was in fact combat related or perhaps was instead a matter of revenge. Another account states that Knight had vowed revenge at the time of his earlier arrest and that at the confrontation on May 22, 1861, Brown was agitated that a known trouble-maker such as Knight was blocking his path. Regardless of the technicalities of transfer of militia units to Union and Confederate forces or whether the confrontation of Brown with Knight was a combat situation or had a personal aspect, Brown and Knight encountered each other as soldiers, at least militia, for their respective causes and Brown was the first Northern or Union supporting soldier to be killed by a Southern or Confederate supporting soldier in the Civil War.

== Aftermath and reburial ==
The Confederates took Brown's body to their camp and their commander, Colonel George A. Porterfield at first refused to return the body. When they learned of this refusal to return Brown's body, a group of the Union-oriented Grafton Guards militia company, under Captain George R. Latham, started for the Confederate camp in order to take the body by force if necessary when it was met by a group of Confederates who were returning the body to Grafton. Initially, Brown was buried in a family plot.

Brown's body was moved to the Grafton National Cemetery in Grafton, West Virginia in June, 1903. A 12-foot-high obelisk commemorating Private Brown as the first Union combat casualty of the war was placed on his grave in the national cemetery in 1928 by the Daughters of Union Veterans of the Civil War and a marker also was placed near the spot where he died.
