= Anna Jarvis House =

Historic house in West Virginia, United States

- U.S. National Register of Historic Places
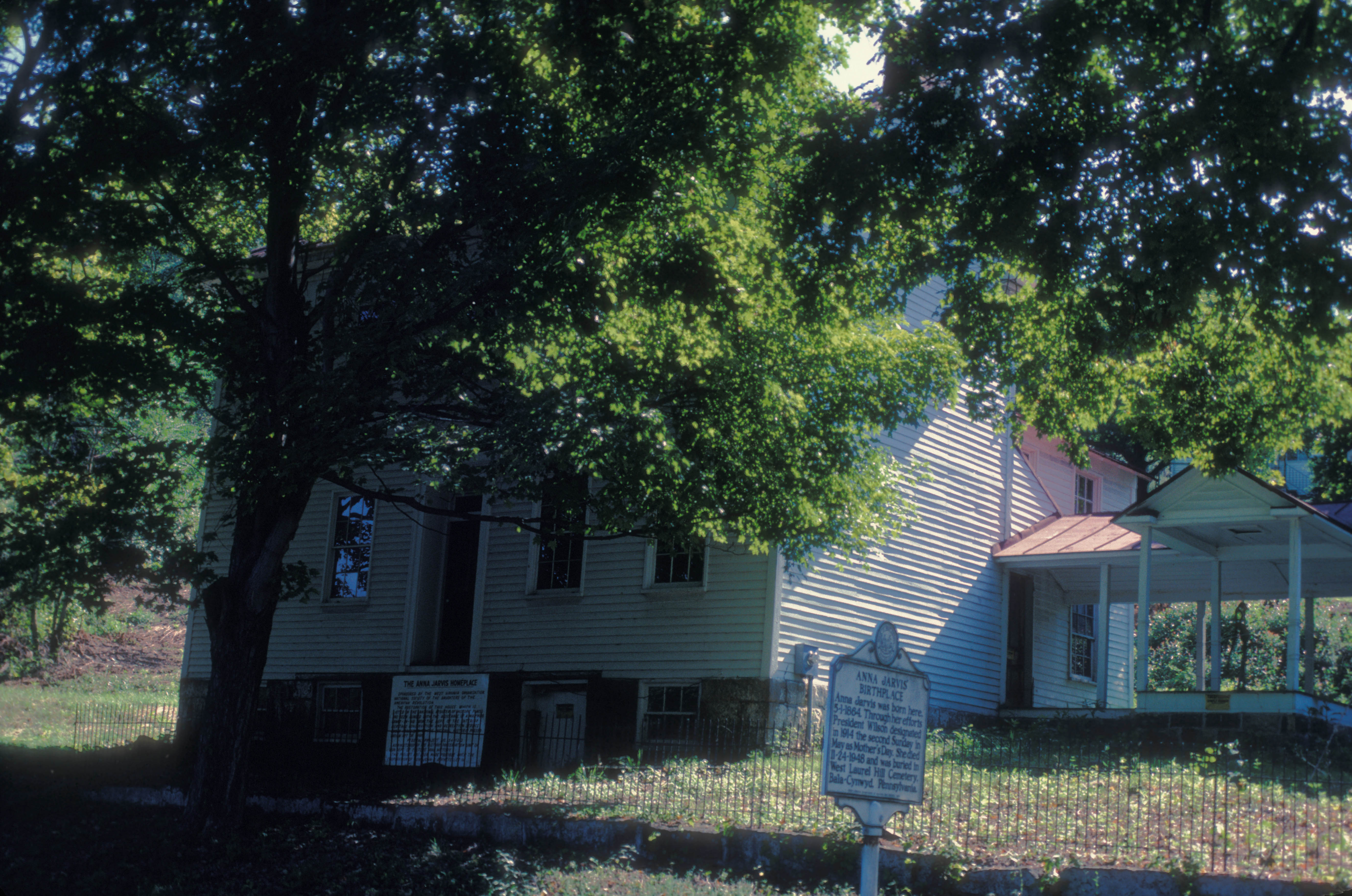

- Location within West Virginia Location within the United States
- Location: U.S. Routes 119 and 250, Webster, West Virginia
- Coordinates: 39°17′37″N 80°2′39″W
- Area: 1.5 acres (0.61 ha)
- Built: 1854
- Architectural style: I-House
- NRHP reference No.: 79002601
- Added to NRHP: May 29, 1979

Anna Jarvis House is a historic home located at Webster in Taylor County, West Virginia, United States. It was built in 1854, and is a frame I-house. It is notable as the birthplace of Anna Jarvis, founder of Mother's Day, and as General George B. McClellan's first field headquarters during his 1861 western Virginia campaign.

It was listed on the National Register of Historic Places in 1979.
