= Grafton National Cemetery =

Historic cemetery in Taylor County, West Virginia

- U.S. National Register of Historic Places
- Grafton National Cemetery

- Location within West Virginia Location within the United States
- Location: Grafton, West Virginia
- Coordinates: 39°20′11″N 80°01′48″W
- NRHP reference No.: 82004330
- Added to NRHP: February 2, 1982

Grafton National Cemetery is a United States National Cemetery located in Grafton, West Virginia. It encompasses a total of 3.2 acres (1.3 ha). Along with West Virginia National Cemetery, it is one of two United States Department of Veterans Affairs national cemeteries in West Virginia, both of which are located in Grafton. The first interments took place in 1867 for casualties of the American Civil War in West Virginia.

The Grafton cemetery is closed to most new interments due to inadequate space. Interments are made at nearby West Virginia National Cemetery since it was dedicated in 1987.

== History ==
In 1867, the United States Department of War directed Major R. C. Bates to find a location where the remains of Union soldiers who had died in West Virginia during the American Civil War could be properly re-interred. (Initially part of the Commonwealth of Virginia at the start of the American Civil War and, as a result, a part of the Confederate States of America due to Virginia's secession from the United States prior to the start of that war, West Virginia subsequently became part of the Union after it seceded from Virginia and the CSA, and formed a new state in 1863.)

Bates found a site adjacent to the town of Grafton's Maple Avenue Cemetery, where many soldiers had already been buried. The terrain was also relatively level, unusual for the mountainous region. The 39th Congress appropriated a 3 acres (1.2 ha) site that same year. The cemetery was dedicated in 1868 by Arthur I. Boreman, the first Governor of West Virginia. Boreman was key in the two-year campaign for a cemetery in the state.

The first interments were held in the lower two terraces: 1,252 Union soldiers, 613 of which were unknown, were buried. Remains from temporary graves in Clarksburg, Grant County, Fayette County, Kanawha County, Marion County, Rich Mountain battle site, and Wheeling, as well as several Union dead from Kentucky were relocated to the National Cemetery. Additionally, some Confederate soldiers were buried.

The cemetery contains the burial site of Thornsbury Bailey Brown, believed to have been the first Union casualty of the Civil War. Brown was believed to have been killed on May 22, 1861 when he refused to acknowledge a Confederate sentry. Brown is said to have shot the Confederate in the ear, and was then shot in the heart. Brown was reinterred at Grafton in 1903 in Section F, Grave 1226. In 1904, the Grand Army of the Republic dedicated a 12 feet (3.7 m) memorial marble obelisk.

The three-acre site sits along Grafton's Walnut Street. It is surrounded by a stone wall approximately 3 feet (0.91 m) high, with entrance gates on three of the sides. A walkway and series of stairs divides the site in half, running from the Walnut Street entrance to the rear entrance. Smaller walkways are laid out perpendicular to the central path, dividing the cemetery into six sections on three leveled terraces. A large flag pole sites in the middle of the central terrace, while next to it is a plaque containing wording from an 1875 act of Congress regarding the preservation of the cemetery.

On the lower terrace are two more plaques that contain the wording of Theodore O'Hara' poem, Bivouac of the Dead. Along the edges of the cemetery are five additional memorial sites dedicated to cenotaphs for service men whose bodies were not recovered, either from sea or elsewhere. The grave markers on the two upper levels are uniform small, white, rectangular stones with arched tops, while the bottom level contains private, individual markers.

Two buildings have stood on the cemetery grounds. A Superintendent's Lodge designed by General Montgomery C. Meigs stood until it was demolished in 1957. The modern caretaker's house, a 1 1/2-story stone building, was constructed c. 1900 and later served as an administrative building.

By the 1960s the Grafton cemetery had limited free space for burials. West Virginia veterans groups began lobbying for a new national cemetery after a 1975 study determined the limited remaining space at Grafton was too steep or costly to use. The West Virginia United Veterans National Cemetery Committee was established and sought to pressure the governor and federal government representatives to seek a new national cemetery. In 1987, the 58 acres (23 ha) West Virginia National Cemetery opened nearby. The Grafton cemetery closed to most new interments. The cemetery offers interment for veterans or eligible family members in existing gravesites.

Grafton National Cemetery was listed on the National Register of Historic Places on February 2, 1982. In addition to the two cemeteries, Grafton holds the longest ongoing annual Memorial Day celebration in the country, first decorating the graves of soldiers in 1867.

== See also ==
- West Virginia Memorial Day Parade
