= International Mother's Day Shrine =

Church in West Virginia, United States

- Andrews Methodist Episcopal Church
- U.S. National Register of Historic Places
- U.S. National Historic Landmark

- Location within West Virginia Location within the United States
- Location: 11 E. Main St., Grafton, WV
- Coordinates: 39°20′26.64″N 80°1′6.75″W
- Area: 1 acre (0.40 ha)
- Built: 1873
- Architect: Phillips and Anderson
- Architectural style: Romanesque
- NRHP reference No.: 70000667

Significant dates
- Added to NRHP: December 18, 1970
- Designated NHL: October 5, 1992

Andrews Methodist Episcopal Church, the "mother church" of Mother's Day, was incorporated as the International Mother's Day Shrine on May 15, 1962, as a shrine to all mothers. It is best known for being the place that Anna Jarvis conceived of the idea of Mother's Day. The church is located along Main Street in downtown Grafton in Taylor County, West Virginia.

The church building is dedicated to Edward Gayer Andrews, a bishop of the Methodist Episcopal Church, who presided over the dedication service on 16 March 1873. The International Mother's Day Shrine was designated a National Historic Landmark October 5, 1992. Its location is approximately one mile south of the junction of U.S. Route 50 and U.S. Route 119. The shrine holds a Mother's Day liturgy annually and is open by appointment, as well as being available for wedding services and tour groups.

== Dedication of Andrews Methodist Episcopal Church ==
Andrews Methodist Episcopal Church is dedicated to Edward Gayer Andrews, a bishop of the Methodist Episcopal Church, who presided over the dedication service on 16 March 1873. In 1903, stained glass windows supplanted the plain glass windows installed when the church was constructed. Christian sacred art by George Blaney that portrays the Agony in the Garden of Gethsemane furnishes the chancel.

== The Founding of Mother's Day ==
Andrews Methodist Episcopal Church is most noted for holding the first official celebration of Mother's Day in 1908. Anna Jarvis, the founder of Mother's Day, conceived the idea as a way to venerate "a mother's private service to her family." This reflected Anna's desire to use Mother's Day as a sentimental way to remember her own mother, Ann Maria Reeves Jarvis, following her mother's death in 1905. Following the original celebrations of Mother's Day in 1908 in Grafton, West Virginia and Philadelphia, Pennsylvania, Jarvis' holiday quickly gained support across America. Jarvis campaigned for recognition of Mother's Day as an official holiday. Anna chose the second Sunday in May as the annual date for the holiday because, in 1908, it had marked the anniversary of her mother's death. The white carnation became a symbol of the day, and was selected by Jarvis to honor her mother's favorite flower. The celebration also extended to many foreign countries within only a few years of its conception. In 1914, President Woodrow Wilson proclaimed that flags be flown "on the second Sunday in May as a public expression of our love and reverence for the mothers of our country." The 1914 proclamation by Wilson represents a victory for Jarvis, since it recognized her holiday and mothers across America. The year 2014 represents the 100th anniversary of Wilson's proclamation and the official national recognition of Mother's Day as a holiday. The International Mother's Day Shrine in Grafton, West Virginia holds special commemorations and events in recognition of this anniversary.

== International Mother's Day ==
The adoption of Mother's Day spread quickly internationally. By the third call for a Mother's Day celebration by Anna Jarvis in 1909, "forty-five states, Puerto Rico, Hawaii, Canada, and Mexico" participated with celebrations on the second Sunday in May. The rapid adoption of Mother's day by other nations surprised Jarvis, who stated, "Where it will end must be left for the future to tell. That it will girdle the globe seems now certain." Jarvis foresaw the international appeal of Mother's Day and believed the celebration and honor would be adopted around the globe. In May 1932, Mother's Day was even adopted in Japan, after 19 years of observance by Christians, showing the wide reach of Anna Jarvis and the embracement of Mother's Day internationally. The international spread and adoption of Mother's Day creates a larger international connection for the Shrine.

== See also ==
- National Register of Historic Places in Taylor County, West Virginia
- List of National Historic Landmarks in West Virginia
