= Grafton, West Virginia =

City in the United States

- City
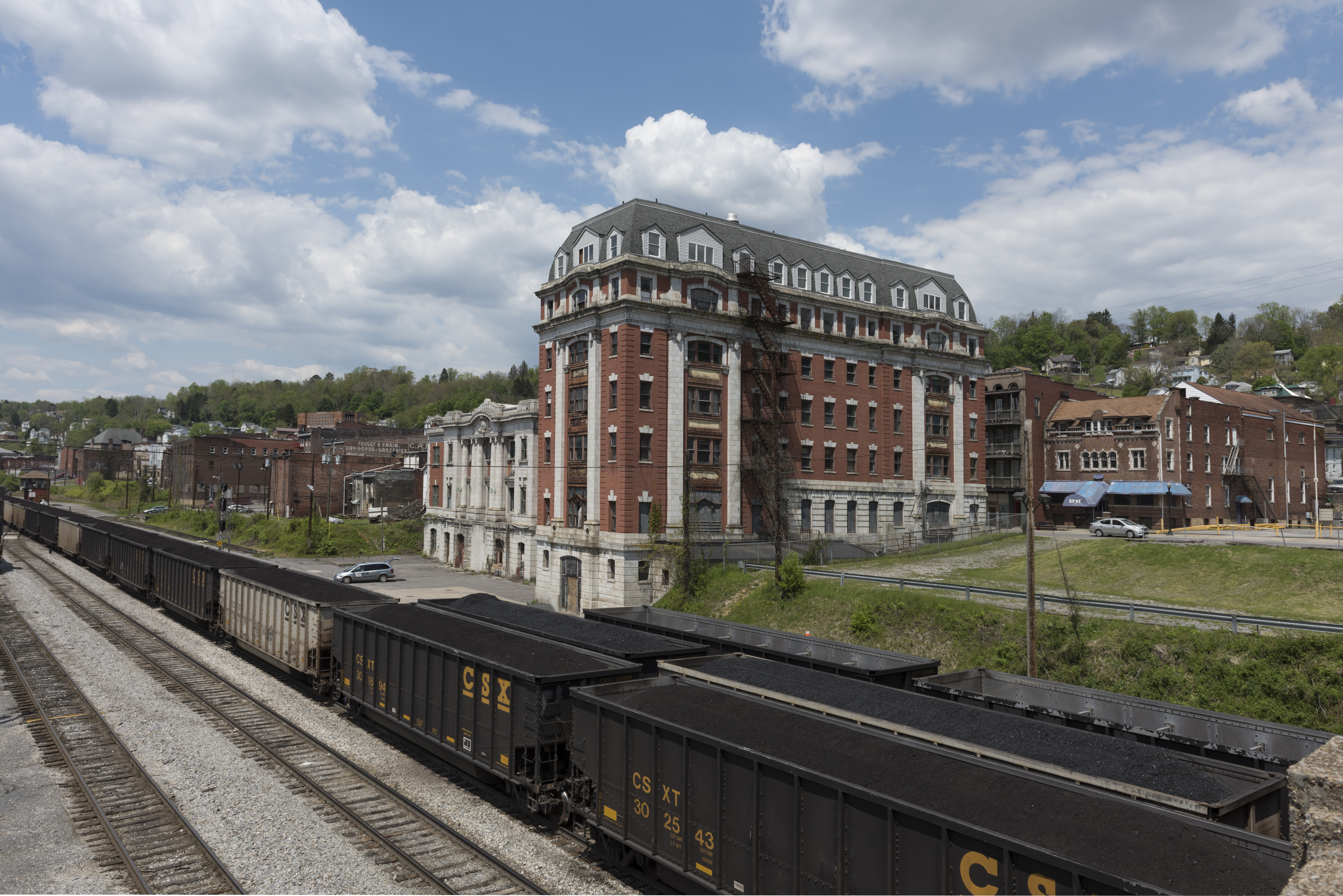
- Grafton CSX yard, with the city's downtown in the background

- Flag Seal Logo
- Interactive map of Grafton, West Virginia
- Location within West Virginia Location within the United States
- Coordinates: 39°20′30″N 80°1′11″W
- Country: United States
- State: West Virginia
- County: Taylor
- Chartered: March 15, 1856

Government
  - Type: Council-manager government
  - City Manager: Coleman Durrett

Area
  - Total: 3.80 sq mi (9.85 km^{2})
  - Land: 3.67 sq mi (9.51 km^{2})
  - Water: 0.13 sq mi (0.34 km^{2})
- Elevation: 1,024 ft (312 m)

Population (2020)
  - Total: 4,722
  - Estimate (2023): 4,589
  - Density: 1,356.6/sq mi (523.77/km^{2})
- Time zone: UTC-5 (Eastern (EST))
  - Summer (DST): UTC-4 (EDT)
- ZIP code: 26354
- Area code: 304
- FIPS code: 54-32716
- GNIS feature ID: 1554590
- Website: www.graftonwv.org

Grafton is a city in Taylor County, West Virginia, United States, and its county seat. The population was 4,729 at the 2020 census. Located along the Tygart Valley River, it originally developed as a junction point for the Baltimore and Ohio Railroad, serving numerous branches of a network that was vital to the regional coal industry.

Grafton is the home of both of West Virginia's national cemeteries, and was where the West Virginia Equal Suffrage Association formed in 1895. Mother's Day was founded in Grafton on May 10, 1908, and the city is home to the International Mother's Day Shrine. Grafton was also among the first cities in the United States to observe Memorial Day.

== History ==
=== Etymology ===
The origin of the name "Grafton" — originally Grafton Junction — is disputed. The city may have been named for John Grafton, a civil engineer of the Baltimore and Ohio Railroad. Alternatively, railroad crews may have referred to the town as "Graftin" because it was the point at which a number of branch railroad lines met (grafted to) the railroad's mainline.

=== Earliest settlers ===
Grafton developed from early white settlements at the confluence of Three Fork Creek with the Tygart Valley River, part of the headwaters region of the Monongahela River watershed. In 1776, Virginia's remote District of West Augusta was divided into three counties, including Monongalia County, which included what are now Taylor County and Grafton.

Among the earliest settlers were James Current (ca. 1730–1822) and his family. He was a Scots-Irish immigrant who fought in the Revolutionary War in 1778, had landed in Maryland and moved into the interior. He was living in Monongalia County with his family by 1782 when he was recorded on a census there. According to family tradition, Current traded a "gray horse" for 1,300 acres of land located where present-day Grafton developed. James and his wife Margaret are buried in Bluemont Cemetery (part of his original property). Current's grave is the only one in Grafton known to belong to a veteran of the Revolutionary War.

=== Turnpike and railroad ===
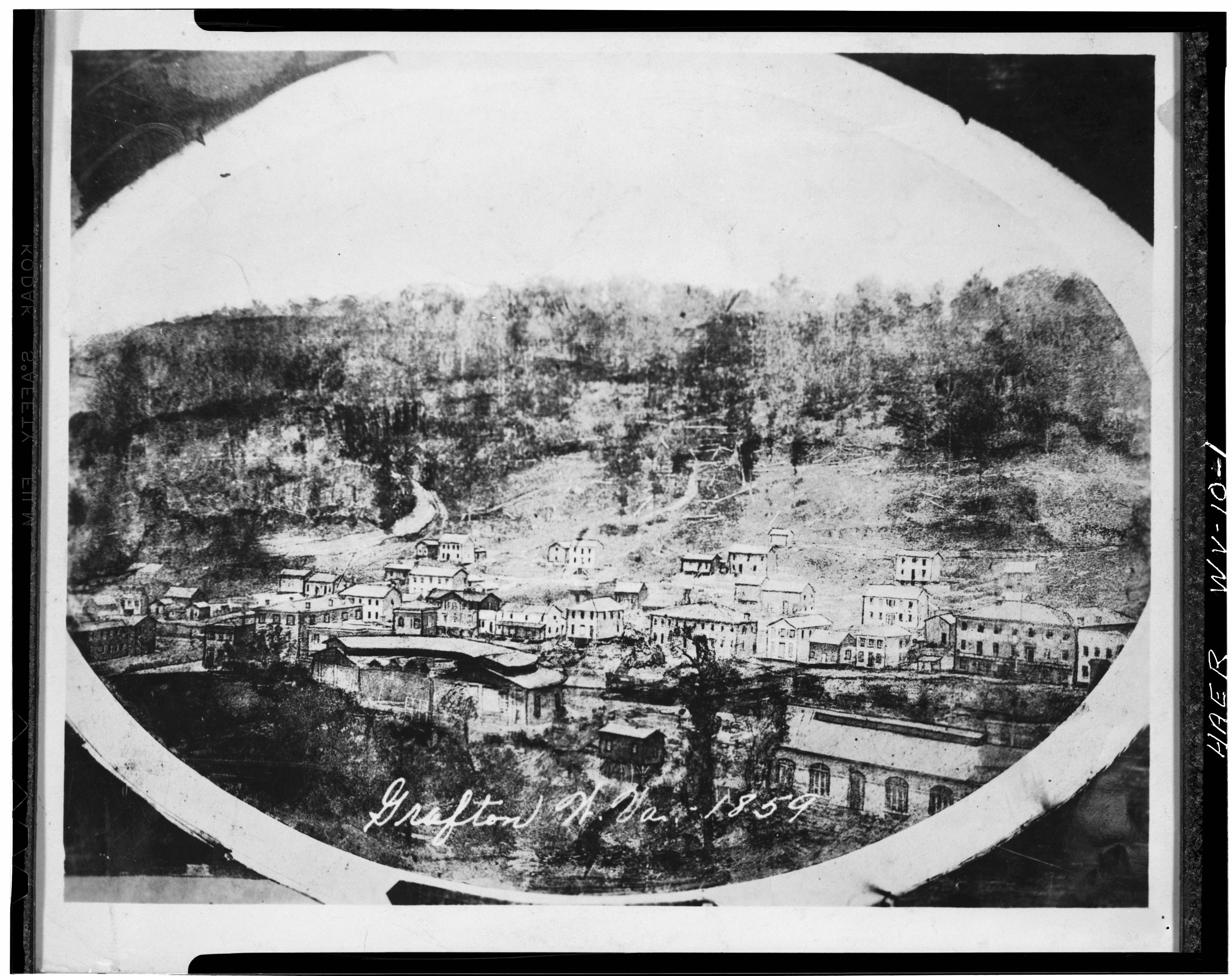
Grafton in 1859, from the Historic American Engineering Review – HAER

John Wolverton Blue (1803–1889) was in charge of the construction of Virginia's Northwestern Turnpike from Aurora to the Tygart Valley. Visiting the future site of Grafton in 1833, he stayed overnight with the Currents. According to a local historian, "Blue, upon awakening the next morning, heard the wife of Current sobbing bitterly" over the impending loss of her "cabin home...[and] vegetable and flower garden" because of the planned right-of-way for the road. "Mr. Blue, a Virginian of the old school, was greatly moved...and...an offer of $300 for 900 acres...and their ruined home...was quickly accepted."

This neighborhood (now a suburb of Grafton) became known as Blueville and it — along with the nearby area called "Valley Bridge" (present day Fetterman, or Ward 1) — began to grow after the Turnpike was completed in 1834. Blue also supervised the construction of a (now long gone) covered bridge over the Tygart here at this time.

In 1847, the Virginia General Assembly passed an act authorizing the Baltimore and Ohio Railroad Company to extend its line to the Ohio River at Wheeling. The city of Grafton owes its existence to the interventions of Thomas S. Haymond (1794–1869), a lawyer and U.S. Congressman (and future Confederate colonel) from nearby Marion County. According to another local historian, "Haymond never mentioned his county as desiring the [rail]road; but being well acquainted with the geography of north-western Virginia, he quietly got the following clause attached to the bill: 'That the said railroad to be constructed through the territory of Virginia, shall reach or cross the Tygart's Valley River at or within three miles of the mouth of Three Fork Creek in the county of Taylor'". This clause effectively re-routed the line away from Morgantown and forced it to pass through Haymond's hometown of Fairmont. Grafton, which is perched in unlikely fashion on a very steep hillside at the mentioned confluence, was the accidental beneficiary, also becoming the branch point for the side line north to Morgantown.

The Grafton B&O Depot

The B&O work crews completed the line on January 11, 1852, and the first "iron horse" arrived two days later. This was the first trans-Appalachian railroad. The population in 1853 was reported as comprising only eight families, but within a year "Grafton Junction" had emerged as a booming railroad town with several more residences and stores. As the railroad facilities were developed, local land was surveyed for the new town, which was chartered on March 15, 1856, in the Virginia General Assembly. The population by this time was 606 people.

=== Civil War ===
Due to the importance of the B&O and Northwestern Virginia Railroads for the movement of troops and supplies, Grafton became an early strategic target during the Civil War (1861–1865) and both sides tried to control it. CSA General Robert E. Lee initially vowed to protect the railroad, and sent first CSA Major Francis M. Boykin Jr., then CSA Col. George A. Porterfield (a Virginia Military Institute graduate from Charles Town across from Harpers Ferry) to recruit at Grafton, but neither had much success. Most Grafton residents, immigrants brought in to work for the railroad, sided with the Union. The Grafton Guards led by Col. George R. Latham became Company B of the 2nd West Virginia Infantry Regiment days after Virginians (over the objection of most of western Virginia) voted for secession on May 23.

The previous evening (May 22, 1861), opposing factions skirmished in the Town of Fetterman (now a part of Grafton), resulting in the death of Thornsbury Bailey Brown, the first soldier killed in the Civil War. Southern supporters joined the Confederate Letcher's Guard.

With the Grafton Guards in Wheeling, Porterfield occupied Grafton on May 25, but left three days later for Philippi, when he realized his vastly outnumbered forces were facing a pincer movement from troops under the Wheeling militia's Col. Benjamin Franklin Kelley (soon to become a Brigadier General and who would station his Railroad Division at Grafton) as well as various Ohio and Indiana units sent by Union General George McClellan, a U.S. Army officer turned railroad man whom President Lincoln had placed in charge of the Department of the Ohio. Kelley planned to attack the Confederates and drive them away from the vital railroads. Although reinforced by about 400 men at Philippi, the Confederates, realizing themselves vastly outnumbered in the June 3 attack, fled, leaving more than 750 muskets, ammunition, wagons, horses, medical supplies and tents behind, so the Battle of Philippi (West Virginia) would sometimes be called the "Philippi Races." Gen. Lee soon replaced Porterfield with CSA Gen. Robert S. Garnett.

Although the Union controlled Grafton, Confederates often raided and vandalized to disrupt railroad operations. The Northwestern Virginia Railroad and its rail yard and machine shops at Grafton were also a probable objective of the Jones-Imboden Raid in April 1863. Raiders did destroy the 3-span bridge across the Monongahela River at Fairmont due north of Grafton (the largest on the line) as well as several smaller bridges, but Grafton's rail yards, which were protected by Mulligan's Brigade, the First and Eighth Maryland, and Miner's Indiana battery, were not attacked.

=== Post-war growth ===
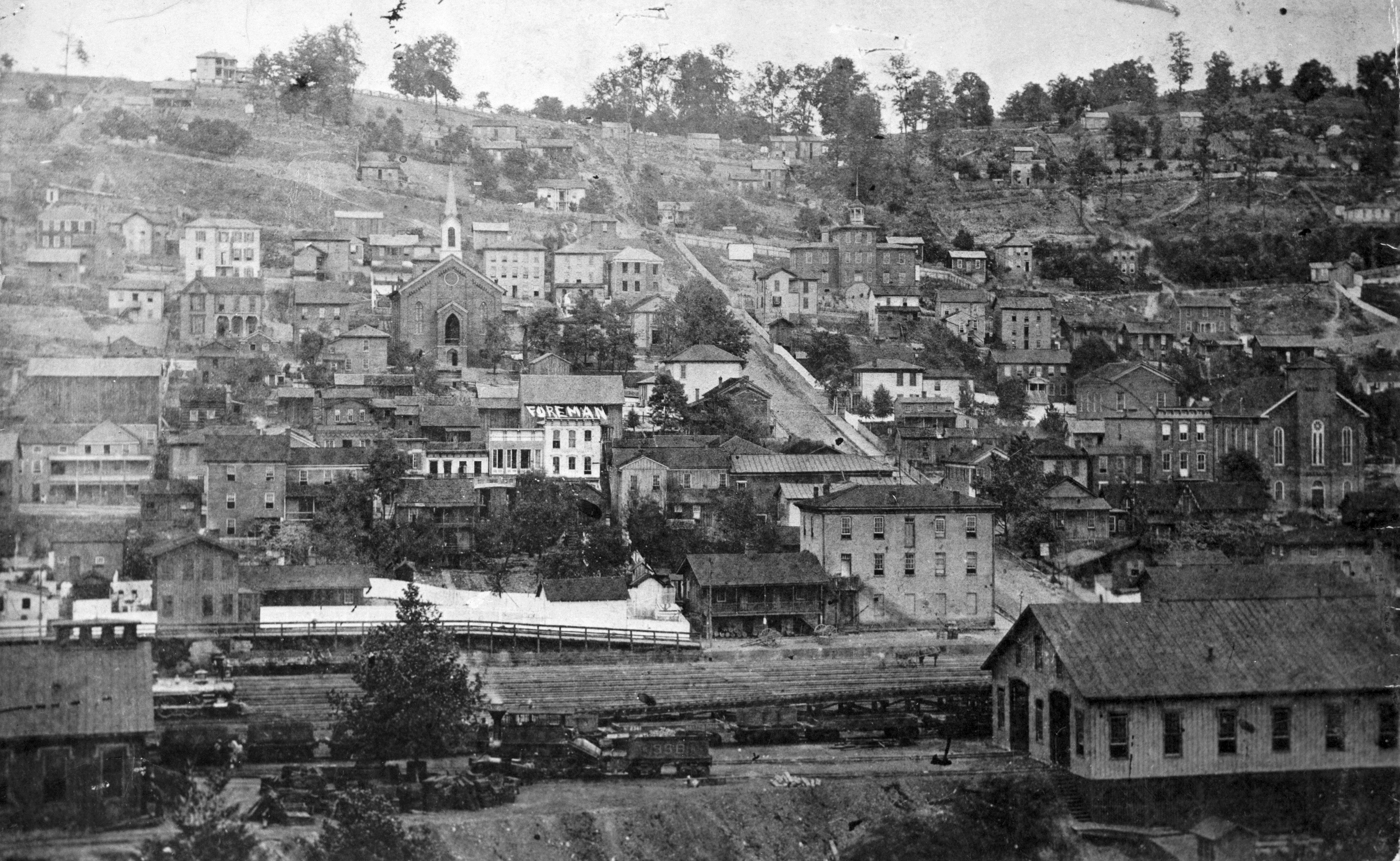
1876

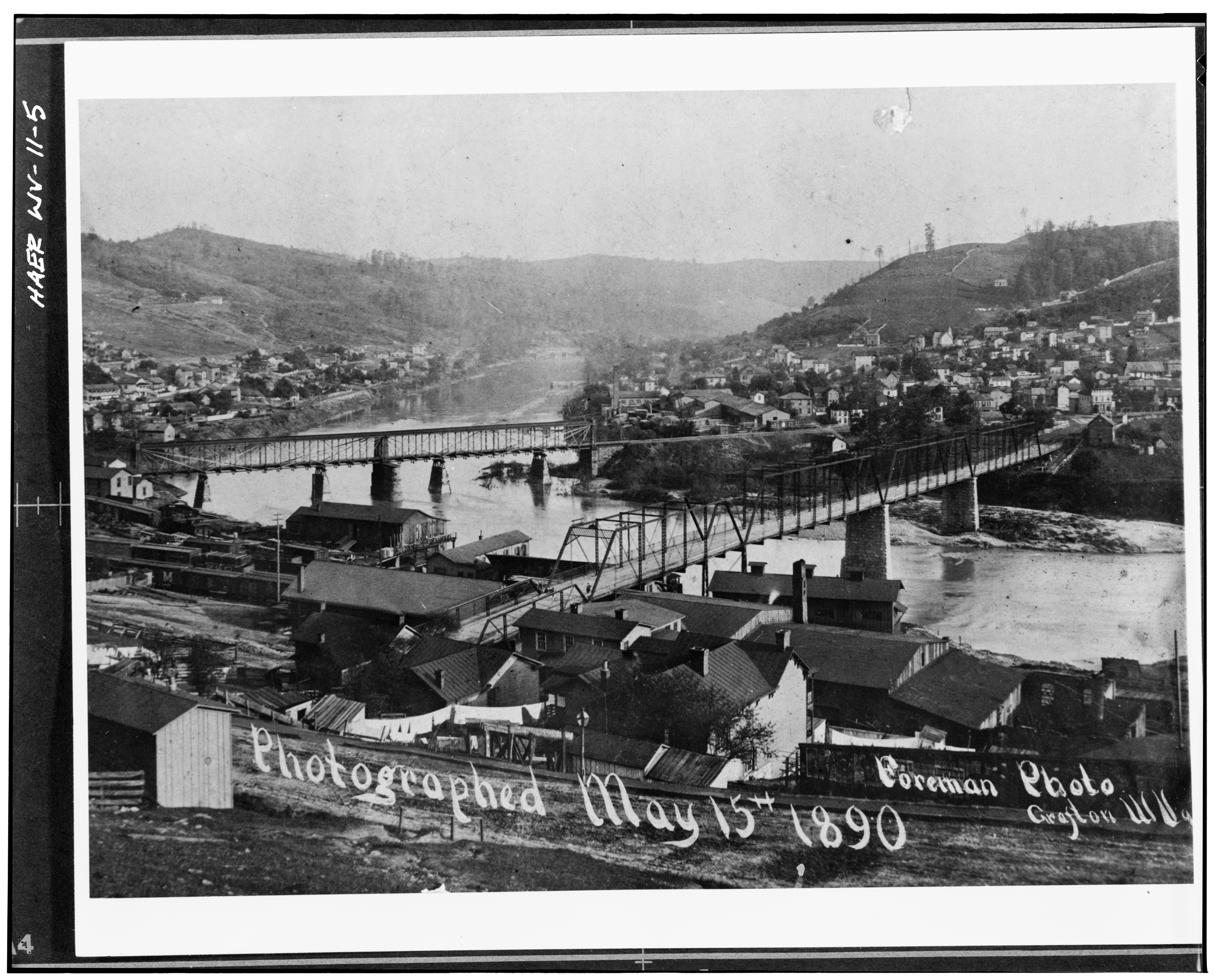
1890

Following the Civil War, Grafton continued to grow and prosper, developing into a major retail and industrial center for North Central West Virginia. Grafton was visited by President U.S. Grant on September 23, 1872, as part of his reelection campaign. Grant's speech was interrupted several times by noisy southern sympathizers.

In 1878, Grafton was designated as the county seat, replacing Pruntytown in this role. A massive flood which swept through town in 1888 wrought many changes, including destruction of the historic (1834) covered bridge at Fetterman. Most of present-day Grafton was built during the period from 1890 to 1930. John T. McGraw, a financier and major contributor to most of Grafton's buildings, was the principal town builder. Besides his bank, McGraw built a number of buildings along Main Street, and also the streetcar system that was used for many years.

=== 20th century ===
Tygart Dam was constructed about 2 miles south of Grafton between 1934 and 1938, by the Works Progress Administration of the Franklin D. Roosevelt administration. President Roosevelt visited the city on a stump tour, and remarked on such projects on October 1, 1936; he gained a landslide re-election the following month. Upstream of the dam, Tygart Lake State Park was designated to preserve recreation areas around the man-made lake. The Tygart Valley River flows through Grafton.

Grafton continued to prosper throughout much of the early 20th century, based on the railroad's importance in both the area and the national economy. But in the early 1950s, the Carr China Plant closed and left hundreds of residents unemployed. In the late 1950s, Hazel Atlas Glass Plant closed and also left hundreds of residents without jobs. In 1958, the women of Grafton organized a parade on Main Street to attract jobs for residents of the community. This parade received national attention. Grafton was the chosen site of a plastic baby toys manufacturer. Because of the residents' efforts, Grafton was given an All-America City Award by the National Civic League in 1962, the smallest city that year to receive the award.

Although instrumental to the city's early growth and economy, the railroad inhibited its expansion. In the 1920s smoke abatement experts reported that the combination of high hills, low wind velocity, and frequent railroad traffic, created air quality problems for the city and its business district, which was adjacent to the area of intense railroad activity. The resulting smoke from the railroad industry was a chief factor in hindering the growth of the city. Restructuring of the railroads and heavy industry through the late 20th century resulted in the loss of more jobs and, ultimately, population. People moved elsewhere for work.

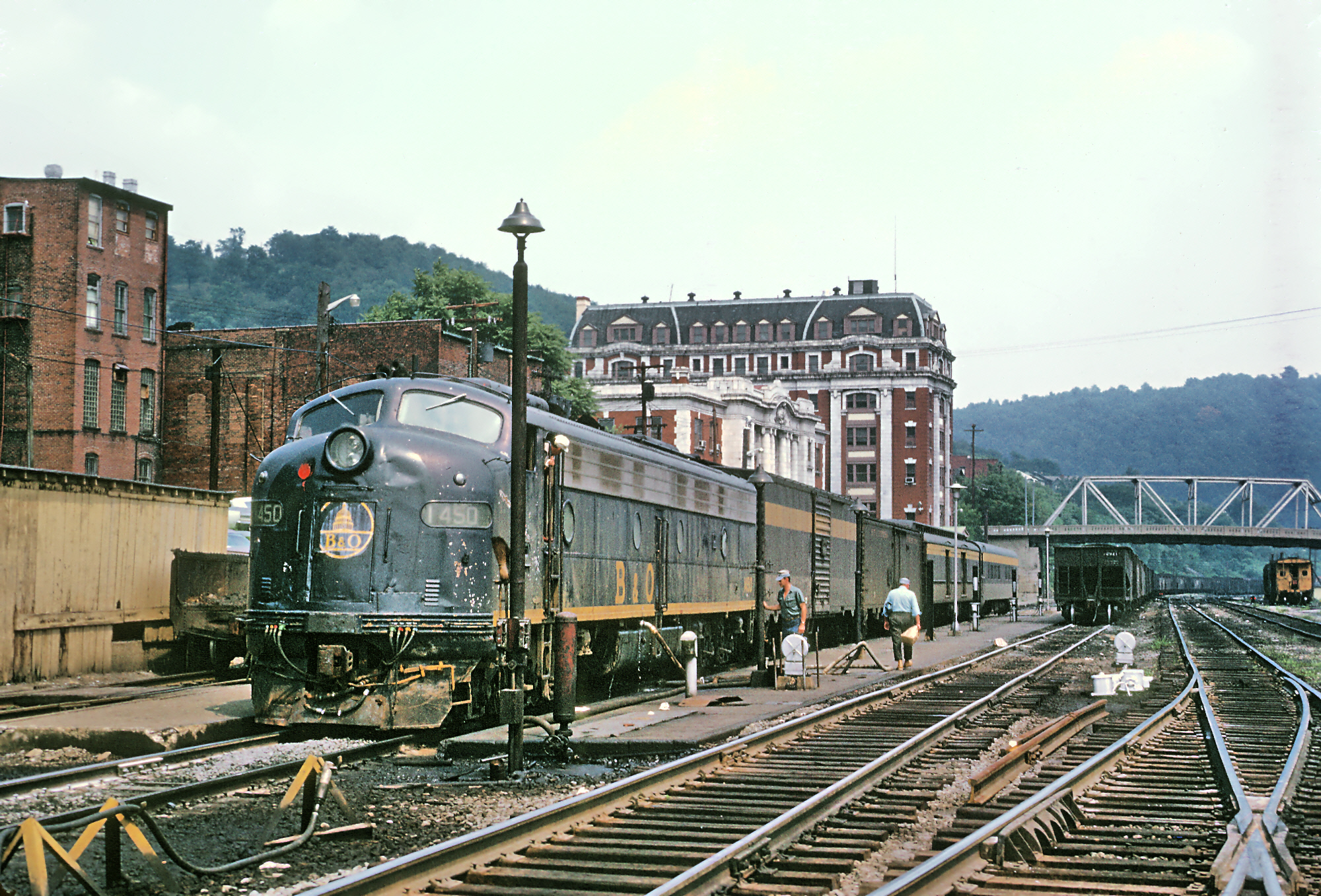
The Metropolitan Special at Grafton Station in July 1970

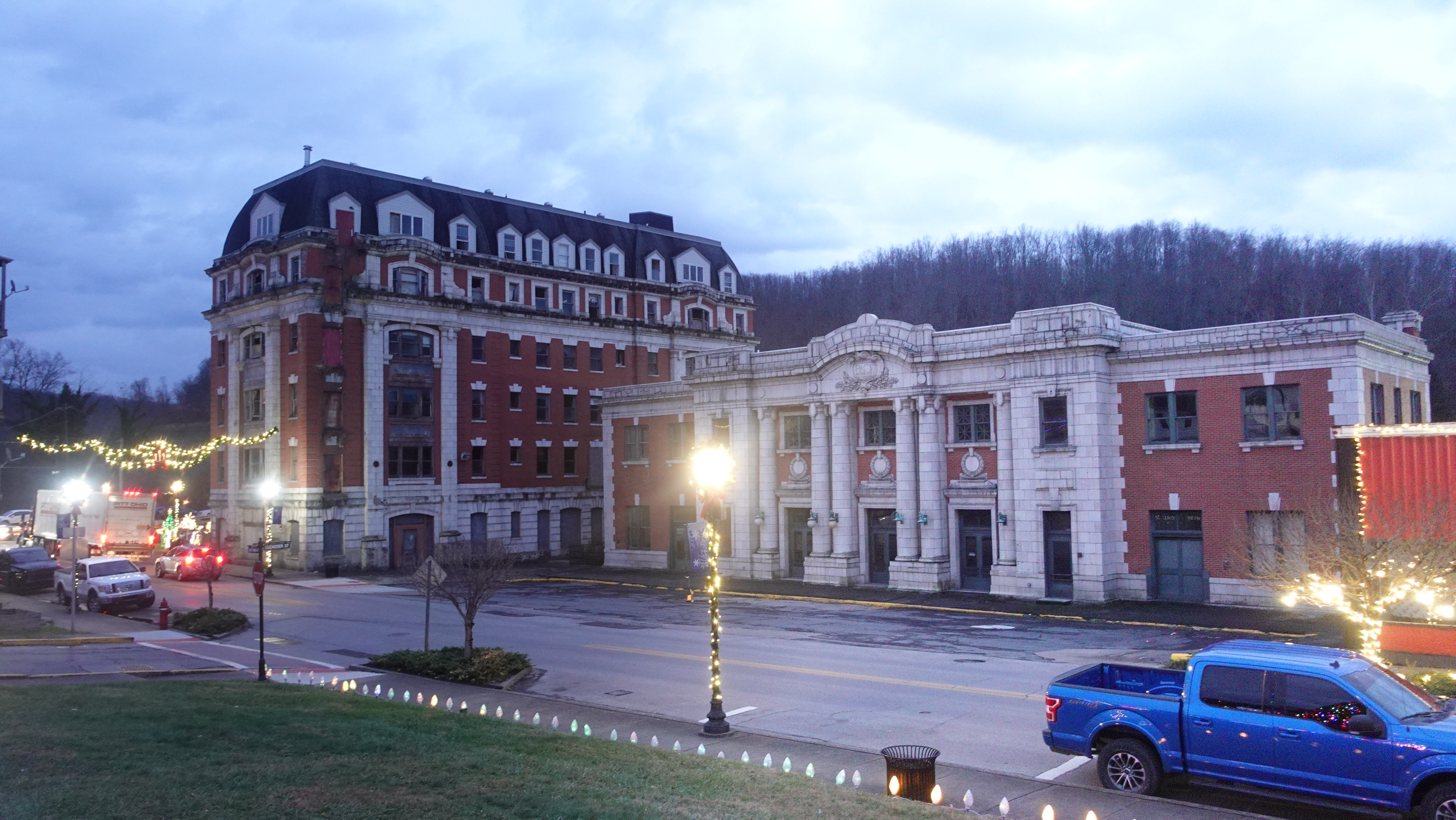
Street view of Grafton Hotel & Grafton B&O Depot in 2023.

In the early 1980s, the railroad relocated hundreds of jobs to Jacksonville, Florida, as the Chessie System aimed to form CSX. Grafton suffered a severe economic and emotional loss from these changes.

The 1985 Election day floods were notable in Grafton. Most of the 47 people killed in this incident were in Pendleton and Grant counties, according to the National Weather Service. Flooding in the Tygart Valley River basin (a tributary to the Monongahela River) set new records for peak discharge at all five of the long-term unregulated gauging stations in the basin. However, the peaks were not as extreme, relative to the previous peaks of record, as those in the Cheat River and South Branch Potomac River basins. Recurrence intervals for the peaks equaled or exceeded 50 years at all five of the aforementioned sites in the Tygart basin, and four were in excess of 100 years. Also, at one newly established gauging station, Three Forks Creek near Grafton, the peak discharge, 12,000 cubic feet per second (340 m^{3}/s), was estimated to exceed the 100-year recurrence interval.

=== Historic places ===
The Grafton Downtown Commercial Historic District was listed on the National Register of Historic Places in 1984 and the Grafton National Cemetery was listed in 1982.

== Geography ==
Grafton is located at 39°20′30″N 80°1′11″W (39.341757, −80.019817), along the Tygart Valley River. Tygart Lake State Park is a major nearby tourist attraction.

According to the United States Census Bureau, the city has a total area of 3.80 square miles (9.84 km^{2}), of which 3.67 square miles (9.51 km^{2}) is land and 0.13 square miles (0.34 km^{2}) is water.

== Demographics ==
Historical population
Census	Pop.	Note	%±
1860	891		—
1870	1,987		123.0%
1880	3,030		52.5%
1890	3,159		4.3%
1900	5,650		78.9%
1910	7,563		33.9%
1920	8,517		12.6%
1930	7,737		−9.2%
1940	7,431		−4.0%
1950	7,365		−0.9%
1960	5,791		−21.4%
1970	6,433		11.1%
1980	6,845		6.4%
1990	5,524		−19.3%
2000	5,489		−0.6%
2010	5,164		−5.9%
2020	4,722		−8.6%
2021 (est.)	4,651		−1.5%
U.S. Decennial Census

=== 2020 census ===
As of the 2020 census, Grafton had a population of 4,722. The median age was 41.9 years. 22.0% of residents were under the age of 18 and 20.4% of residents were 65 years of age or older. For every 100 females there were 91.4 males, and for every 100 females age 18 and over there were 87.1 males age 18 and over.

96.8% of residents lived in urban areas, while 3.2% lived in rural areas.

There were 2,040 households in Grafton, of which 27.7% had children under the age of 18 living in them. Of all households, 36.9% were married-couple households, 20.2% were households with a male householder and no spouse or partner present, and 32.9% were households with a female householder and no spouse or partner present. About 34.1% of all households were made up of individuals and 16.3% had someone living alone who was 65 years of age or older.

There were 2,329 housing units, of which 12.4% were vacant. The homeowner vacancy rate was 3.3% and the rental vacancy rate was 7.3%.

Racial composition as of the 2020 census
Race	Number	Percent
White	4,410	93.4%
Black or African American	36	0.8%
American Indian and Alaska Native	3	0.1%
Asian	15	0.3%
Native Hawaiian and Other Pacific Islander	0	0.0%
Some other race	11	0.2%
Two or more races	247	5.2%
Hispanic or Latino (of any race)	65	1.4%

=== 2010 census ===
As of the census of 2010, there were 5,164 people, 2,192 households, and 1,357 families residing in the city. The population density was 1,407.1 inhabitants per square mile (543.3/km^{2}). There were 2,512 housing units at an average density of 684.5 per square mile (264.3/km^{2}). The racial makeup of the city was 97.1% White, 0.7% African American, 0.3% Native American, 0.2% Asian, 0.1% from other races, and 1.5% from two or more races. Hispanic or Latino of any race were 0.9% of the population.

There were 2,192 households, of which 29.0% had children under the age of 18 living with them, 41.3% were married couples living together, 15.0% had a female householder with no husband present, 5.6% had a male householder with no wife present, and 38.1% were non-families. 33.8% of all households were made up of individuals, and 15.3% had someone living alone who was 65 years of age or older. The average household size was 2.29 and the average family size was 2.92.

The median age in the city was 41.7 years. 21.9% of residents were under the age of 18; 8.4% were between the ages of 18 and 24; 23.9% were from 25 to 44; 26.9% were from 45 to 64; and 19% were 65 years of age or older. The gender makeup of the city was 47.6% male and 52.4% female.

=== 2000 census ===
As of the census of 2000, there were 5,489 people, 2,277 households, and 1,448 families residing in the city. The population density was 1,491.1 inhabitants per square mile (575.7/km^{2}). There were 2,575 housing units at an average density of 699.5 per square mile (270.1/km^{2}). The racial makeup of the city was 98.07% White, 0.84% African American, 0.27% Native American, 0.16% Asian, 0.05% from other races, and 0.60% from two or more races. Hispanic or Latino people of any race comprised 0.67% of the population.

There were 2,277 households, out of which 29.4% had children under the age of 18 living with them, 45.4% were married couples living together, 14.2% had a female householder with no husband present, and 36.4% were non-families. 33.2% of all households were made up of individuals, and 17.9% had someone living alone who was 65 years of age or older. The average household size was 2.33 and the average family size was 2.95.

In the city the population was spread out, with 23.6% under the age of 18, 7.7% from 18 to 24, 25.4% from 25 to 44, 22.0% from 45 to 64, and 21.3% who were 65 years of age or older. The median age was 40 years. For every 100 females, there were 87.1 males. For every 100 females age 18 and over, there were 82.2 males.

The median income for a household in the city was $18,981, and the median income for a family was $25,161. Males had a median income of $22,765 versus $16,629 for females. The per capita income for the city was $9,616. About 26.6% of families and 35.1% of the population were below the poverty line, including 51.2% of those under age 18 and 15.7% of those age 65 or over.

== National cemeteries ==
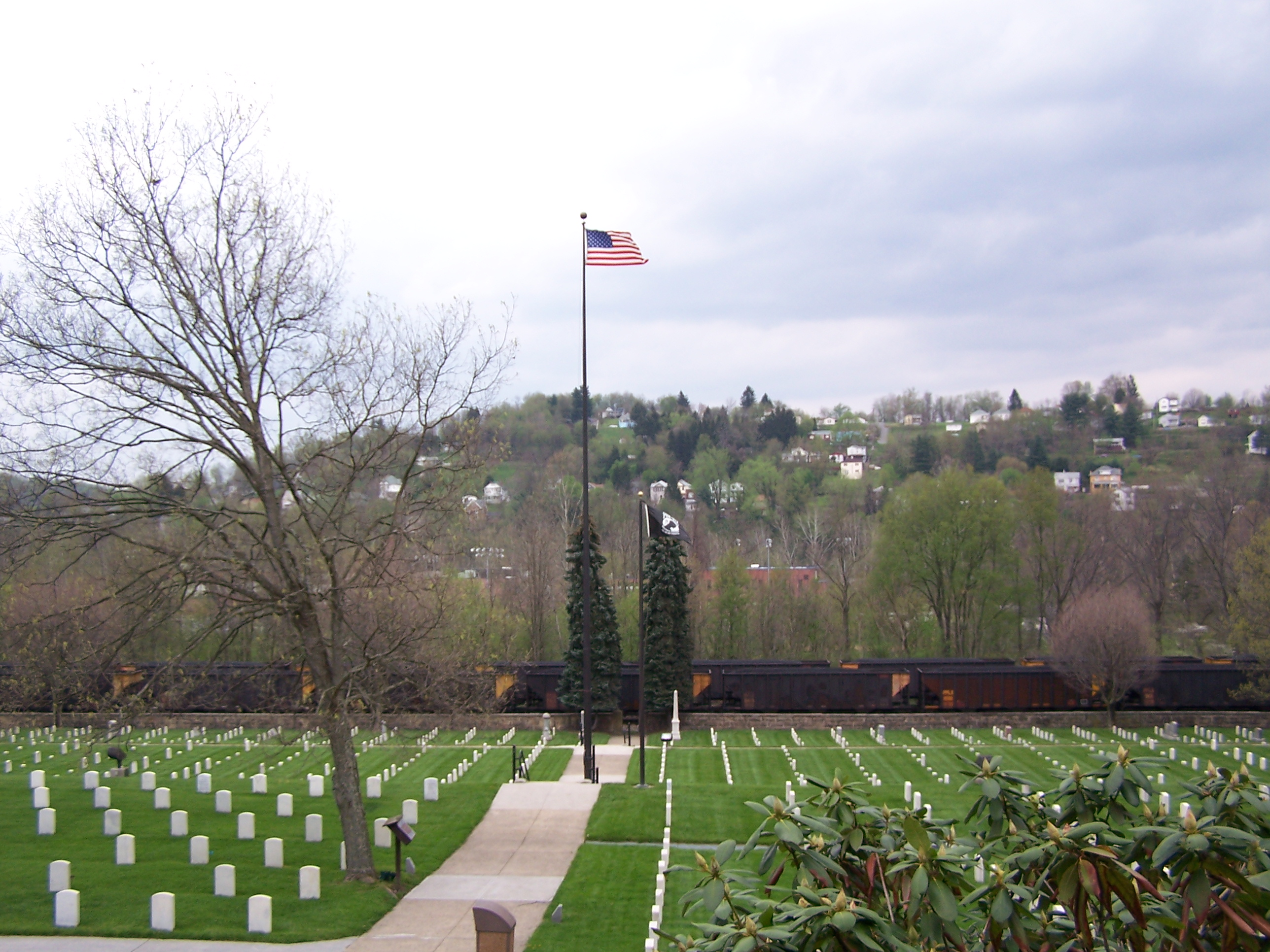
Grafton National Cemetery

Thornsbury Bailey Brown was the first soldier killed in the Civil War, at Fetterman, now part of Grafton. He is interred at the Grafton National Cemetery. This was opened in 1868 to provide a burial ground for Union soldiers who died in West Virginia's military hospitals and battlefields. The Federal Government selected Grafton as the site of the national cemetery for its proximity to the Maple Avenue Cemetery, which already contained the remains of many US Civil War veterans.

On June 14, the first governor of West Virginia, Arthur Boreman, officially dedicated the cemetery. The cemetery contains more than 2,100 interments, including 1,252 Union soldiers. 613 Civil War soldiers are buried as unknowns and their graves are identified with six-inch square marble markers. In 1875, an Act of Congress was passed authorizing "preservation and maintenance" of the cemetery. Two plaques on the lowest terrace contain stanzas from Theodore O'Hara's poem "Bivouac of the Dead."

Memorial Day services at Grafton National Cemetery include a special tradition known locally as "Flower Strewing Day". Historically, each year a parade begins in downtown Grafton and winds to the cemetery, where town children place flowers at each grave marker. The day concludes with a memorial service officiated by a prominent West Virginian. Every governor, except one who served a term of only six days, has spoken at the Grafton National Cemetery at least once during their term in office.

== Folklore ==
=== The Grafton Monster ===
On June 15, 1964, Grafton Sentinel reporter Robert Cockrell spotted a mysterious creature in Grafton while he was on the road around 11 p.m. near the Tygart Valley River. This creature was large, standing around 7–9 feet tall, white, hairy and without a noticeable head. After witnessing this encounter, Cockrell was eager to write an article on the monster. The reports of this creature were thought to be unbelievable by the editors of the paper and they originally rejected his article. However, after more sources began to witness similar encounters, the news outlet allowed Cockrell to publish the report. Following Cockrell's report, numerous individuals claimed to have seen the creature, leading to widespread interest and local investigations. No physical evidence has been found to substantiate the sightings.

On June 15, 2024, Grafton celebrated the 60th anniversary of the Grafton Monster sighting during its Grafton Monster Festival. Hundreds of visits and vendors packed the streets of Grafton for the soft opening of the Grafton Monster Museum, located at 107 West Main St. The events that occurred during the two-day festival included guest speakers, a cryptid cosplay contest, and even a Grafton Monster calling contest, which resembled a whistling noise. The town is planning to make the Grafton Monster Festival a yearly event occurring each year on June 15.

Grafton is a location in the game Fallout 76.

== Education ==
The sole school district in the county is Taylor County School District.

== Notable people ==
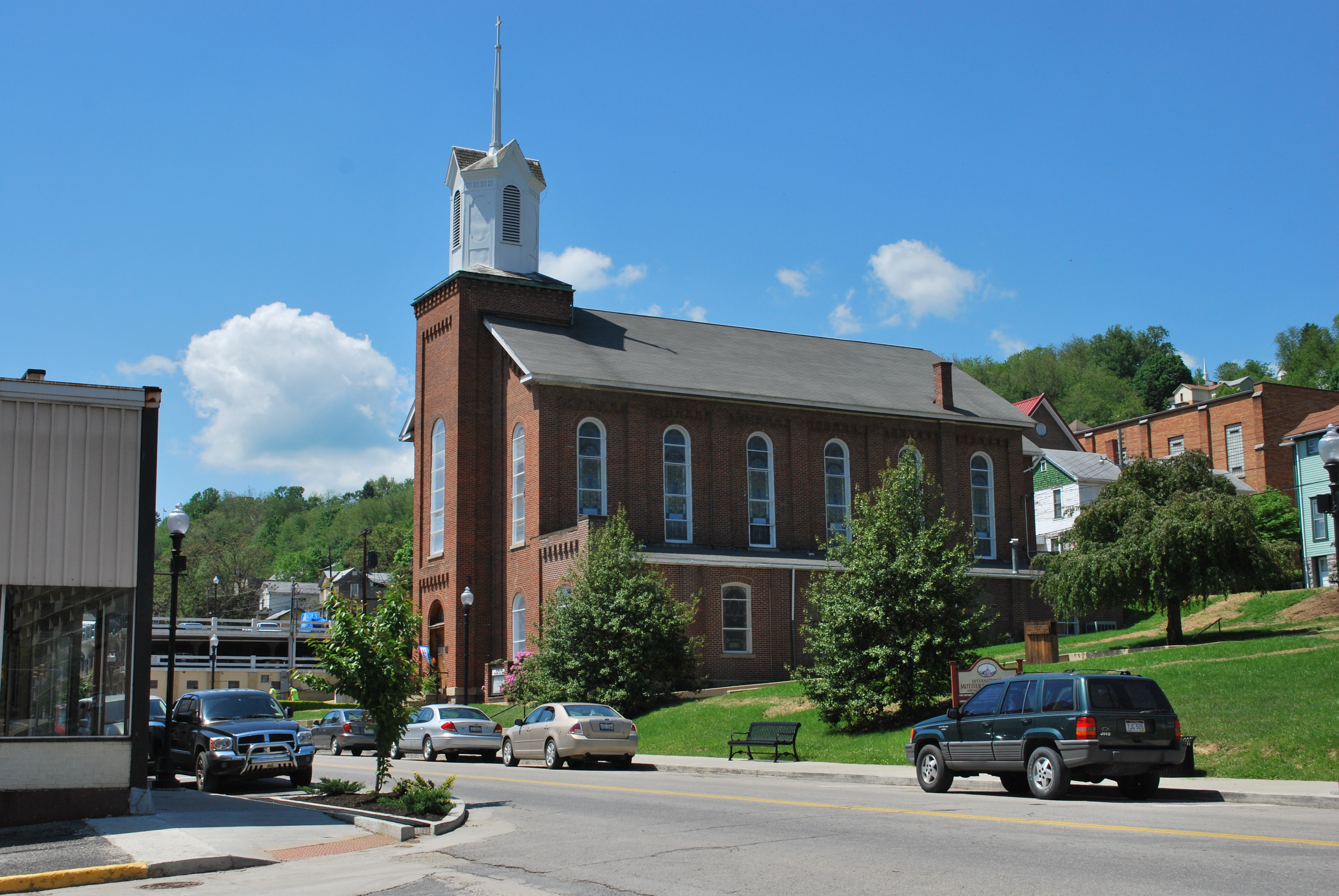
International Mother's Day Shrine

- Clair Bee, author and basketball coach for Long Island University, born in Grafton
- Martin McNulty Crane, Texas politician and attorney, born in Grafton
- Marmaduke H. Dent, justice of the West Virginia Supreme Court of Appeals, lived in Grafton most of his life
- Frank Gatski, aka "Gunner Gatski", Pro Football Hall of Fame center for Cleveland Browns
- Robert Halbritter, politician and judge, born in Grafton
- Anna Jarvis, founder of Mother's Day
- William Jaco, mathematician at Oklahoma State University, born in Grafton
- Frances Benjamin Johnston, early photographer and photojournalist, born in Grafton
- George Preston Marshall, longtime owner and president of NFL's Washington Commanders, born in Grafton
- Eldora Nuzum, first female editor of daily newspaper in West Virginia and interviewer of U.S. presidents, born in Grafton
- Ira E. Robinson, politician and lawyer
- James W. Stansberry, United States Air Force lieutenant general, born in Grafton
