= Clarksburg micropolitan area =

Fairmont–Clarksburg, WV Fairmont–Clarksburg, WV Combined Statistical Area
- Combined Statistical Area
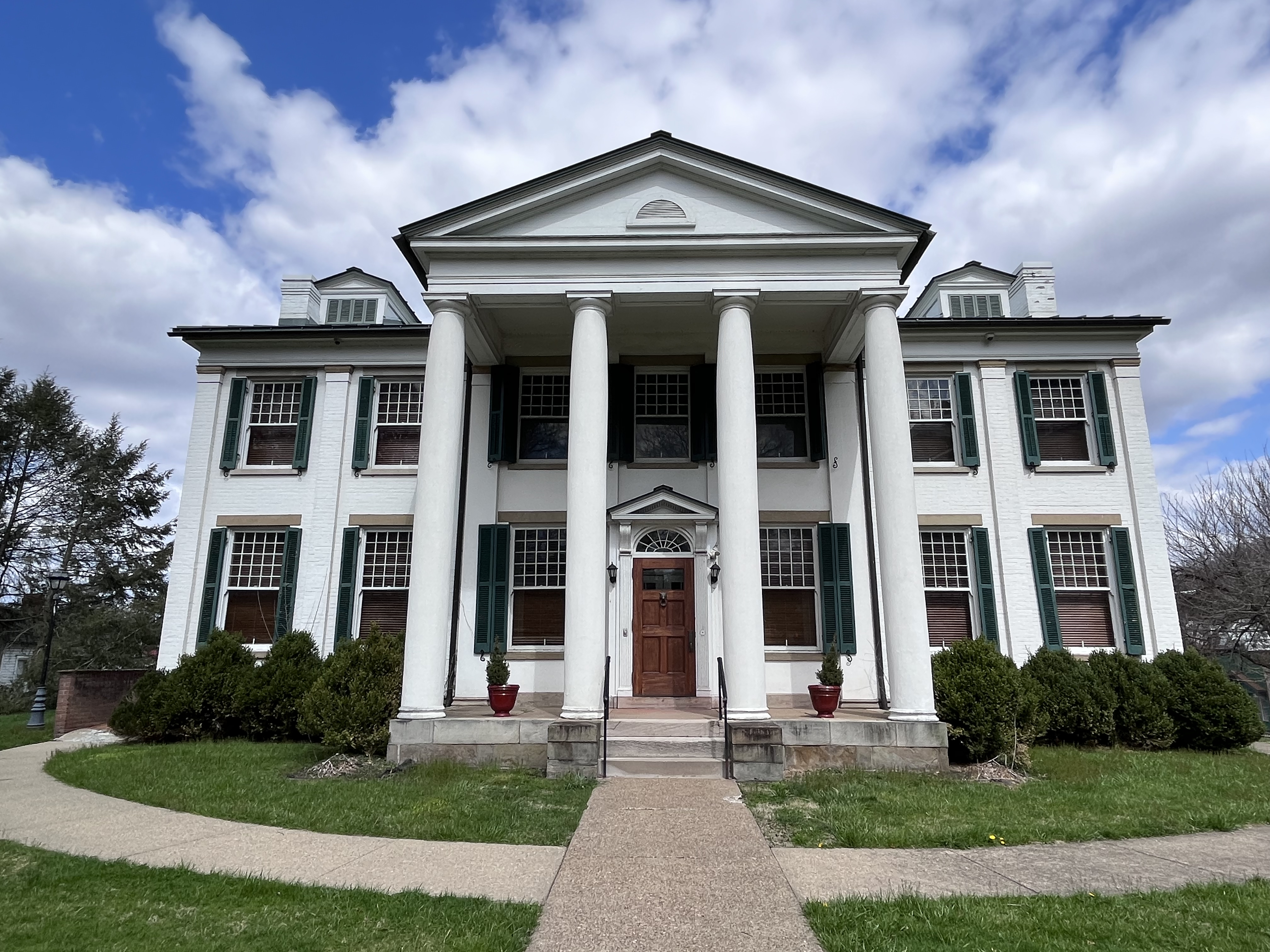
- Waldomore
Map of Fairmont–Clarksburg, WV CSA
Clarksburg, WV µSA
Fairmont, WV µSA
City of Fairmont
City of Clarksburg
- Country: United States
- State: West Virginia
- Largest city: Fairmont
- Other cities: Clarksburg

Population (2020)
  - Total: 146,641
  - Estimate (July 2024): 144,174
- Time zone: UTC−5 (EST)
  - Summer (DST): UTC−4 (EDT)

The Clarksburg Micropolitan Statistical Area, as defined by the United States Census Bureau, is an area consisting of four counties in North-Central West Virginia, anchored by the city of Clarksburg.

As of the 2020 census, the μSA had a population of 90,431, with an estimated 2024 population of 88,525.The Fairmont-Clarksburg CSA had a population of 146,641 at the 2020 census, with a 2024 estimate of 144,174.

== Counties ==
- Doddridge
- Harrison
- Taylor
- Marion

== Communities ==
- Places with 10,000 or more inhabitants
  - Clarksburg (Principal city)
- Places with 5,000 to 10,000 inhabitants
  - Bridgeport
- Places with 1,000 to 5,000 inhabitants
  - Despard
  - Nutter Fort
  - Salem
  - Shinnston
  - Stonewood
  - Grafton
- Places with less than 1,000 inhabitants
  - Anmoore
  - Enterprise
  - Flemington
  - Lost Creek
  - Lumberport
  - West Milford
  - West Union

- Unincorporated places
  - Astor
  - Belgium
  - Blueville
  - Brownlow
  - Center Point
  - Elliotsville
  - Fetterman
  - Hepzibah
  - Knottsville
  - Lucretia
  - McGee
  - Meadland
  - Millertown
  - New Milton
  - Oreide
  - Park View
  - Pruntytown
  - Rosemont
  - Santiago
  - Simpson
  - Smithburg
  - South Grafton
  - Tappan
  - Thornton
  - Webster
  - Wendel
  - West Grafton

== Demographics ==
As of the census of 2000, there were 92,144 people, 37,032 households, and 25,677 families residing within the μSA. The racial makeup of the μSA was 96.96% White, 1.37% African American, 0.17% Native American, 0.48% Asian, 0.03% Pacific Islander, 0.18% from other races, and 0.82% from two or more races. Hispanic or Latino of any race were 0.86% of the population.

The median income for a household in the μSA was $28,143, and the median income for a family was $33,198. Males had a median income of $28,991 versus $20,825 for females. The per capita income for the μSA was $14,666.

Clarksburg μSA
Census	Pop.	Note	%±
1850	19,845		—
1860	26,456		33.3%
1870	33,157		25.3%
1880	42,188		27.2%
1890	46,249		9.6%
1900	56,357		21.9%
1910	77,607		37.7%
1920	105,511		36.0%
1930	108,169		2.5%
1940	113,753		5.2%
1950	112,744		−0.9%
1960	99,836		−11.4%
1970	93,295		−6.6%
1980	101,727		9.0%
1990	91,509		−10.0%
2000	92,144		0.7%
2010	94,196		2.2%
2020	90,431		−4.0%

== See also ==
- West Virginia census statistical areas
