= West Virginia College =

Former Baptist-affiliated college in the U.S. state of West Virginia

- Other names: West Virginia College at Flemington; Flemington College
- Type: Private university
- Active: 1865 (opened); 1868 (established by the legislature)–1895
- Religious affiliation: Free Will Baptist
- Location: Flemington, West Virginia, United States; 39°16′01.7″N 80°07′09.1″W
- Campus: Rural
- Journal: Graphic
- Location of West Virginia College in West Virginia

West Virginia College, also known as West Virginia College at Flemington or Flemington College, was a private institution affiliated with the Free Will Baptist denomination. Located in Flemington in Taylor County, West Virginia, the college was established in 1865 by Reverend Flavius J. Cather and other Free Will Baptists, serving as a successor to Rector College. West Virginia College was formally incorporated by the state in 1868. The college provided a classical and English education but faced low enrollment and financial difficulties, leading to its closure in 1895. The final graduation ceremony was held in 1894.

== History ==
At the close of the American Civil War, Reverend Flavius J. Cather and the Free Will Baptists sought to establish an institution of higher education in Flemington, located in Taylor County, West Virginia. This institution was intended as a successor to the Free Will Baptists' Rector College in nearby Pruntytown, which had ceased operations in 1855, and was destroyed by fire in 1857. In September 1865, the Free Will Baptists opened West Virginia College.

On May 1, 1866, a corporation was created for West Virginia College "for the purpose of establishing an institution of learning, in which the ordinary branches of an English and classical education may be taught." The nine shareholders of this corporation initially subscribed a total of $5,000 in capital. (Note: The nine shareholders of the West Virginia College corporation consisted of Benjamin Bailey, Flavius J. Cather, J. H. Cather, L. E. Davidson, J. B. Newlon, George Payne, David Powell, John St. Clair, and Joseph West.) Secretary of State of West Virginia Granville D. Hall certified this agreement on February 19, 1867.

The following year, the West Virginia Legislature passed an act incorporating West Virginia College in Flemington on June 26, 1868. This act established a governing body known as the Stockholders of West Virginia College, which was composed of 24 corporators responsible for the oversight and management of the college's real estate, infrastructure, other property, assets, and rights. (Note: The corporators of West Virginia College consisted of Benjamin Bailey, Silas P. Bailey, F. A. Cather, Flavius J. Cather, Frank Cather, Jasper Cather, Jesse H. Cather, Robert G. Cather, Francis Copland, L. E. Davidson, Miner S. Fleming, W. H. La Follett, Cornelius Lawson, George Payne, David Powell, Elijah Powell, William M. Powell, John Prunty, Isaac D. Ross, W. H. Shields, John Sinclair, E. Sinsel, Cyrus Webb, A. W. Woodford, and their associates.) The legislation granted authority to Jesse H. Cather, the president of the college's stockholders, and David Powell, the secretary, to convene a meeting for the purpose of electing the board of directors, which would be known as the Trustees of West Virginia College. The act concluded that the corporation's capital stock shall not exceed $500,000, divided into shares of $25 each.

When the act was passed in 1868, West Virginia College had approximately 120 students enrolled, including 20 students in its collegiate department. In September 1868, Reverend Alvin D. Williams was elected college president. Williams also served as a travelling secretary for West Virginia College for the purposes of fundraising for the institution until his appointment as general superintendent of West Virginia free schools in February 1870.

Williams was succeeded as president by his assistant Reverend William Colegrove in 1870. Colegrove had previously joined West Virginia College as a professor of languages in 1868. In 1874, Colegrove began operating West Virginia College as a private institution, which it remained until its closure. In 1878, the Grafton Sentinel reported that an "Algebraic problem whose solution had been pronounced impossible was taken to West Virginia College" and solved by the then-president in less than five minutes using his new method. In 1879, college president Colegrove authored the college textbook, A Complete Scientific Grammar of the English Language.

The 1876 Report of the Commissioner of Education stated that West Virginia College had seven instructors, 31 preparatory students, four collegiate students, property valued at $15,000, and 574 volumes in its library. However, by 1880, West Virginia College was staffed by two instructors and had an enrollment of 38 students. Additionally, the institution's alumni comprised approximately 250 former students. The college consisted of a "substantial brick building", still valued at $15,000, and its library contained 600 volumes. The institution did not have an endowment.

Colegrove resigned from the presidency on February 19, 1880, and was succeeded by O. G. Augier. By 1882, West Virginia College began publishing a monthly journal entitled the Graphic. Augier stepped down as president on August 9, 1882, and was followed by Howard N. Ogden, who served for one year. Ogden was then succeeded by Reverend W. E. Joliffe, who held the position until July 26, 1887. Following Joliffe, Reverend T. E. Peden took over as president. During this time, West Virginia College struggled to secure additional investments and experienced low enrollment. During the academic year of 1894-1895, Haywood Fleming served as acting president, after which the institution was no longer mentioned in official state reports and ceased operations. The final reported graduation at the college was held on May 17, 1894.

== Facility ==
West Virginia College's facilities consisted of a small two-story red brick building. During the construction of the building, the residents of Flemington made the bricks to save costs because ordering the bricks was too expensive. Following the school's closure in 1895, the West Virginia College building housed a normal school for six years before its transfer to Taylor County Schools ownership in 1901. In 1902, the building became one of the state's first district high schools. The building then served as Flemington High School until it was demolished in the 1950s.

== Legacy ==
In December 1868, the West Virginia Legislature renamed the Agricultural College of West Virginia in Morgantown to West Virginia University. This change was partly made to distinguish it from West Virginia College, the name of which caused confusion in mail distribution to the two institutions. West Virginia historian Charles Henry Ambler remarked of West Virginia College, "All told, the college department did not graduate more than two score students, but it maintained high standards and thus left worthy traditions." In 1982, the West Virginia Department of Culture and History erected a historical marker for West Virginia College at Flemington Elementary School on Simpson Road (West Virginia Secondary Route 13). The marker reads:

Opened on this site in 1865 by Free Will Baptists led by local resident Rev. F. J. Cather. Chartered by the legislature June 26, 1868. Rev. A. D. Williams became first president and served until 1870 when he resigned to become Supt. of Free Schools in W. Va. It functioned into the 1890's when reduced enrollments forced its closing. Building served Flemington High School until razed in 1950's.

== Bibliography ==
- Ambler, Charles Henry (1951). A History of Education in West Virginia From Early Colonial Times to 1949. Huntington, West Virginia: Standard Printing & Publishing Company. OCLC 1205534 – via Internet Archive.
- Colegrove, William (1879). A Complete Scientific Grammar of the English Language. New York: The Authors' Publishing Company. OCLC 1042557641 – via Internet Archive.
- Doherty, William T., Jr.; Summers, Festus P. (2013). West Virginia University: Symbol of Unity in a Sectionalized State. Morgantown, West Virginia: West Virginia University Press. OCLC 867742272.
- The Freewill Baptists (1881). The Centennial Record of Freewill Baptists, 1780–1880. Dover, New Hampshire: The Printing Establishment. OCLC 1041802062 – via Internet Archive.
- R.L. Polk & Company (1882). West Virginia State Gazetteer and Business Directory. Vol. II. Detroit & Philadelphia: R.L. Polk & Company. OCLC 32233702 – via Internet Archive.
- United States Bureau of Education (1878). Report of the Commissioner of Education for the Year 1876. Washington, D.C.: Government Printing Office. OCLC 9689669125 – via Internet Archive.
- West Virginia Legislature (1868a). Acts of the Legislature of West Virginia at the Sixth Session, Commencing January 21st, 1868. Wheeling, West Virginia: John Frew, Public Printer. OCLC 422695120 – via Internet Archive.
- West Virginia Legislature (1868b). Acts of the Legislature of West Virginia at an Extraordinary Session, Commencing June 2nd, 1868. Wheeling, West Virginia: John Frew, Public Printer. OCLC 422695120 – via Internet Archive.
