= Pruntytown State Farm Wildlife Management Area =

State Wildlife Management Area in Taylor County, West Virginia

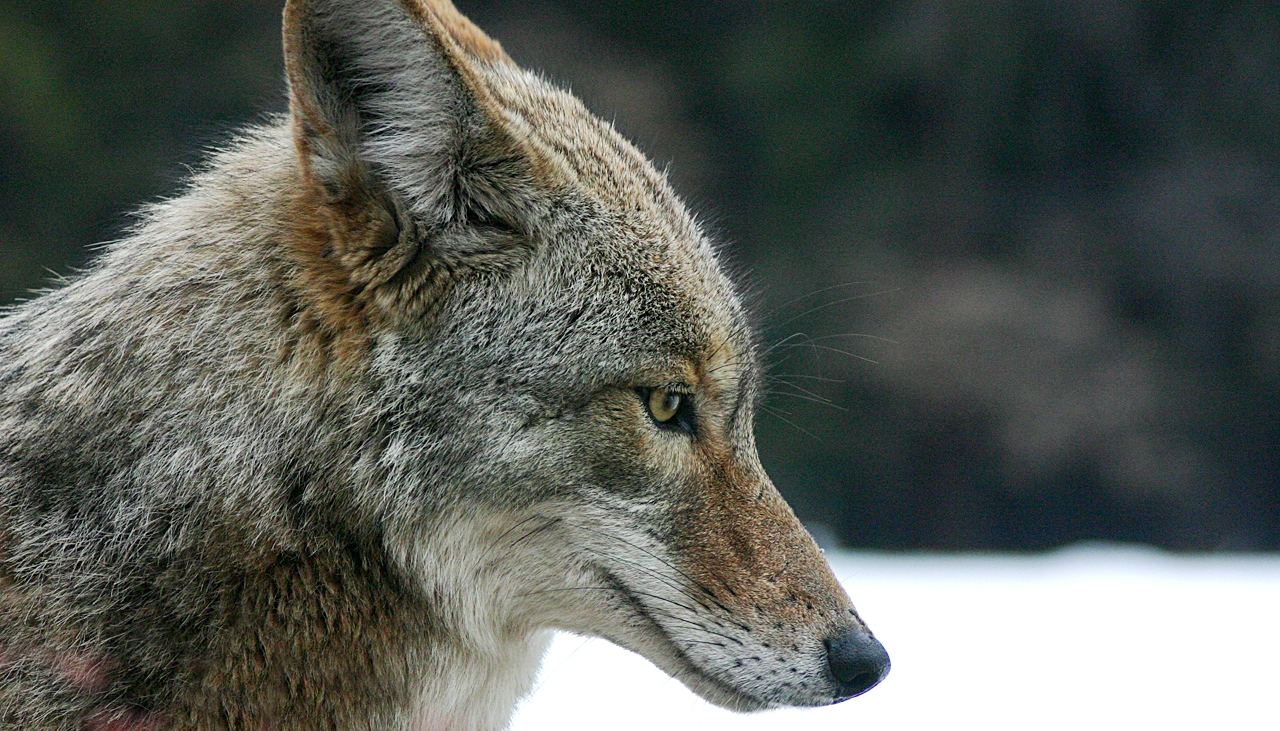
- Coyote (Canis latrans) may be found at the Pruntytown State Farm WMA

- Location within West Virginia
- Location: Taylor, West Virginia, United States
- Coordinates: 39°19′51″N 80°05′34″W
- Area: 1,764 acres (7.14 km^{2})
- Elevation: 1,245 ft (379 m)
- Operator: Wildlife Resources Section, WV Division of Natural Resources and WV Department of Agriculture

Pruntytown State Farm Wildlife Management Area, is located near Pruntytown, West Virginia in Taylor County. The WMA is managed as a beef cattle farm by the West Virginia Department of Agriculture. Located on 1,764 acres (7.14 km^{2}) gently sloping farmland with hay and pasture fields and woodlots on the steeper slopes.

Access to Pruntytown State Farm WMA is from U.S. Route 50 about 1/2 mile west of Pruntytown or from County Route 38 south of Pruntytown.

== Hunting and Fishing ==
Hunting opportunities in Pruntytown State Farm WMA include coyote, deer, grouse, mourning dove, rabbit, and turkey.

Although camping is not allowed at the WMA, camping is available at nearby Tygart Lake State Park. A firearm safety zone is maintained around the barns and other farm buildings.

== See also ==
- Animal conservation
- Hunting
- List of West Virginia wildlife management areas
