= West Virginia statistical areas =

Coordinates: 38.6409°N 80.6227°W

The U.S. state of West Virginia currently has 20 statistical areas that have been delineated by the Office of Management and Budget (OMB). On July 21, 2023, the OMB delineated five combined statistical areas, 10 metropolitan statistical areas, and five micropolitan statistical areas in West Virginia. As of 2023, the largest of these is the Charleston-Huntington-Ashland, WV-OH-KY CSA, which includes West Virginia's capital and largest city, Charleston.

== Statistical areas ==
The Office of Management and Budget (OMB) has designated more than 1,000 statistical areas for the United States and Puerto Rico. These statistical areas are important geographic delineations of population clusters used by the OMB, the United States Census Bureau, planning organizations, and federal, state, and local government entities.

The OMB defines a core-based statistical area (CBSA) as the county or counties (or county-equivalents) surrounding at least one densely-settled core of at least 10,000 population, "plus adjacent counties having a high degree of social and economic integration with the core as measured through commuting ties with the counties containing the core". The OMB further divides a CBSA based on population into a metropolitan statistical area (MSA) for those with at least 50,000 people or a micropolitan statistical area (μSA) for those with 10,000 to 49,999 people.

The OMB defines a combined statistical area (CSA) as two or more adjacent CBSAs where the employment interchange rate (percent commuting from A to B plus percent commuting from B to A) is at least 15%. A primary statistical area (PSA) includes all CSAs and any CBSA that is not a constituent of a combined statistical area.

The 20 United States statistical areas and 55 counties of the State of West Virginia (Note: An out-of-state area and its population are displayed in green. An area that extends into more than one state is displayed in purple. A purple population number over a black population number show the total population versus the in-state population. The state's abbreviation is also shown next to the in-state total.)
Combined statistical area	2025 population (est.)	Core-based statistical area	2025 population (est.)	County	2025 population (est.)	Metropolitan division	2025 population (est.)
Charleston-Huntington-Ashland, WV-OH-KY CSA	637,500; 385,547 (WV)	Huntington-Ashland, WV-KY-OH MSA	365,965; 185,377 (WV)	Cabell County, West Virginia	91,183	none	
Charleston-Huntington-Ashland, WV-OH-KY CSA	637,500; 385,547 (WV)	Huntington-Ashland, WV-KY-OH MSA	365,965; 185,377 (WV)	Putnam County, West Virginia	56,885	none	
Charleston-Huntington-Ashland, WV-OH-KY CSA	637,500; 385,547 (WV)	Huntington-Ashland, WV-KY-OH MSA	365,965; 185,377 (WV)	Lawrence County, Ohio	55,710	none	
Charleston-Huntington-Ashland, WV-OH-KY CSA	637,500; 385,547 (WV)	Huntington-Ashland, WV-KY-OH MSA	365,965; 185,377 (WV)	Boyd County, Kentucky	47,751	none	
Charleston-Huntington-Ashland, WV-OH-KY CSA	637,500; 385,547 (WV)	Huntington-Ashland, WV-KY-OH MSA	365,965; 185,377 (WV)	Wayne County, West Virginia	37,309	none	
Charleston-Huntington-Ashland, WV-OH-KY CSA	637,500; 385,547 (WV)	Huntington-Ashland, WV-KY-OH MSA	365,965; 185,377 (WV)	Greenup County, Kentucky	35,213	none	
Charleston-Huntington-Ashland, WV-OH-KY CSA	637,500; 385,547 (WV)	Huntington-Ashland, WV-KY-OH MSA	365,965; 185,377 (WV)	Carter County, Kentucky	26,149	none	
Charleston-Huntington-Ashland, WV-OH-KY CSA	637,500; 385,547 (WV)	Huntington-Ashland, WV-KY-OH MSA	365,965; 185,377 (WV)	Lawrence County, Kentucky	15,765	none	
Charleston-Huntington-Ashland, WV-OH-KY CSA	637,500; 385,547 (WV)	Charleston, WV MSA	200,170	Kanawha County, West Virginia	172,381	none	
Charleston-Huntington-Ashland, WV-OH-KY CSA	637,500; 385,547 (WV)	Charleston, WV MSA	200,170	Boone County, West Virginia	20,251	none	
Charleston-Huntington-Ashland, WV-OH-KY CSA	637,500; 385,547 (WV)	Charleston, WV MSA	200,170	Clay County, West Virginia	7,538	none	
Charleston-Huntington-Ashland, WV-OH-KY CSA	637,500; 385,547 (WV)	Portsmouth, OH μSA	71,365	Scioto County, Ohio	71,365	none	
Washington-Baltimore-Arlington, DC-MD-VA-WV-PA CSA	10,274,894; 244,756 (WV)	Washington-Arlington-Alexandria, DC-VA-MD-WV MSA	6,465,724; 63,102 (WV)	Fairfax County, Virginia	1,167,873	Arlington-Alexandria-Reston, VA-WV MD	3,247,647; 63,102 (WV)
Washington-Baltimore-Arlington, DC-MD-VA-WV-PA CSA	10,274,894; 244,756 (WV)	Washington-Arlington-Alexandria, DC-VA-MD-WV MSA	6,465,724; 63,102 (WV)	Prince William County, Virginia	502,966	Arlington-Alexandria-Reston, VA-WV MD	3,247,647; 63,102 (WV)
Washington-Baltimore-Arlington, DC-MD-VA-WV-PA CSA	10,274,894; 244,756 (WV)	Washington-Arlington-Alexandria, DC-VA-MD-WV MSA	6,465,724; 63,102 (WV)	Loudoun County, Virginia	449,749	Arlington-Alexandria-Reston, VA-WV MD	3,247,647; 63,102 (WV)
Washington-Baltimore-Arlington, DC-MD-VA-WV-PA CSA	10,274,894; 244,756 (WV)	Washington-Arlington-Alexandria, DC-VA-MD-WV MSA	6,465,724; 63,102 (WV)	Arlington County, Virginia	243,931	Arlington-Alexandria-Reston, VA-WV MD	3,247,647; 63,102 (WV)
Washington-Baltimore-Arlington, DC-MD-VA-WV-PA CSA	10,274,894; 244,756 (WV)	Washington-Arlington-Alexandria, DC-VA-MD-WV MSA	6,465,724; 63,102 (WV)	City of Alexandria, Virginia	160,662	Arlington-Alexandria-Reston, VA-WV MD	3,247,647; 63,102 (WV)
Washington-Baltimore-Arlington, DC-MD-VA-WV-PA CSA	10,274,894; 244,756 (WV)	Washington-Arlington-Alexandria, DC-VA-MD-WV MSA	6,465,724; 63,102 (WV)	Stafford County, Virginia	170,803	Arlington-Alexandria-Reston, VA-WV MD	3,247,647; 63,102 (WV)
Washington-Baltimore-Arlington, DC-MD-VA-WV-PA CSA	10,274,894; 244,756 (WV)	Washington-Arlington-Alexandria, DC-VA-MD-WV MSA	6,465,724; 63,102 (WV)	Spotsylvania County, Virginia	155,388	Arlington-Alexandria-Reston, VA-WV MD	3,247,647; 63,102 (WV)
Washington-Baltimore-Arlington, DC-MD-VA-WV-PA CSA	10,274,894; 244,756 (WV)	Washington-Arlington-Alexandria, DC-VA-MD-WV MSA	6,465,724; 63,102 (WV)	Fauquier County, Virginia	76,503	Arlington-Alexandria-Reston, VA-WV MD	3,247,647; 63,102 (WV)
Washington-Baltimore-Arlington, DC-MD-VA-WV-PA CSA	10,274,894; 244,756 (WV)	Washington-Arlington-Alexandria, DC-VA-MD-WV MSA	6,465,724; 63,102 (WV)	Jefferson County, West Virginia	63,102	Arlington-Alexandria-Reston, VA-WV MD	3,247,647; 63,102 (WV)
Washington-Baltimore-Arlington, DC-MD-VA-WV-PA CSA	10,274,894; 244,756 (WV)	Washington-Arlington-Alexandria, DC-VA-MD-WV MSA	6,465,724; 63,102 (WV)	Culpeper County, Virginia	57,666	Arlington-Alexandria-Reston, VA-WV MD	3,247,647; 63,102 (WV)
Washington-Baltimore-Arlington, DC-MD-VA-WV-PA CSA	10,274,894; 244,756 (WV)	Washington-Arlington-Alexandria, DC-VA-MD-WV MSA	6,465,724; 63,102 (WV)	City of Manassas, Virginia	44,332	Arlington-Alexandria-Reston, VA-WV MD	3,247,647; 63,102 (WV)
Washington-Baltimore-Arlington, DC-MD-VA-WV-PA CSA	10,274,894; 244,756 (WV)	Washington-Arlington-Alexandria, DC-VA-MD-WV MSA	6,465,724; 63,102 (WV)	Warren County, Virginia	42,740	Arlington-Alexandria-Reston, VA-WV MD	3,247,647; 63,102 (WV)
Washington-Baltimore-Arlington, DC-MD-VA-WV-PA CSA	10,274,894; 244,756 (WV)	Washington-Arlington-Alexandria, DC-VA-MD-WV MSA	6,465,724; 63,102 (WV)	City of Fredericksburg, Virginia	30,393	Arlington-Alexandria-Reston, VA-WV MD	3,247,647; 63,102 (WV)
Washington-Baltimore-Arlington, DC-MD-VA-WV-PA CSA	10,274,894; 244,756 (WV)	Washington-Arlington-Alexandria, DC-VA-MD-WV MSA	6,465,724; 63,102 (WV)	City of Fairfax, Virginia	26,772	Arlington-Alexandria-Reston, VA-WV MD	3,247,647; 63,102 (WV)
Washington-Baltimore-Arlington, DC-MD-VA-WV-PA CSA	10,274,894; 244,756 (WV)	Washington-Arlington-Alexandria, DC-VA-MD-WV MSA	6,465,724; 63,102 (WV)	City of Manassas Park, Virginia	16,560	Arlington-Alexandria-Reston, VA-WV MD	3,247,647; 63,102 (WV)
Washington-Baltimore-Arlington, DC-MD-VA-WV-PA CSA	10,274,894; 244,756 (WV)	Washington-Arlington-Alexandria, DC-VA-MD-WV MSA	6,465,724; 63,102 (WV)	Clarke County, Virginia	15,609	Arlington-Alexandria-Reston, VA-WV MD	3,247,647; 63,102 (WV)
Washington-Baltimore-Arlington, DC-MD-VA-WV-PA CSA	10,274,894; 244,756 (WV)	Washington-Arlington-Alexandria, DC-VA-MD-WV MSA	6,465,724; 63,102 (WV)	City of Falls Church, Virginia	15,159	Arlington-Alexandria-Reston, VA-WV MD	3,247,647; 63,102 (WV)
Washington-Baltimore-Arlington, DC-MD-VA-WV-PA CSA	10,274,894; 244,756 (WV)	Washington-Arlington-Alexandria, DC-VA-MD-WV MSA	6,465,724; 63,102 (WV)	Rappahannock County, Virginia	7,439	Arlington-Alexandria-Reston, VA-WV MD	3,247,647; 63,102 (WV)
Washington-Baltimore-Arlington, DC-MD-VA-WV-PA CSA	10,274,894; 244,756 (WV)	Washington-Arlington-Alexandria, DC-VA-MD-WV MSA	6,465,724; 63,102 (WV)	Prince George's County, Maryland	970,374	Washington, DC-MD MD	1,840,612
Washington-Baltimore-Arlington, DC-MD-VA-WV-PA CSA	10,274,894; 244,756 (WV)	Washington-Arlington-Alexandria, DC-VA-MD-WV MSA	6,465,724; 63,102 (WV)	District of Columbia	693,645	Washington, DC-MD MD	1,840,612
Washington-Baltimore-Arlington, DC-MD-VA-WV-PA CSA	10,274,894; 244,756 (WV)	Washington-Arlington-Alexandria, DC-VA-MD-WV MSA	6,465,724; 63,102 (WV)	Charles County, Maryland	176,593	Washington, DC-MD MD	1,840,612
Washington-Baltimore-Arlington, DC-MD-VA-WV-PA CSA	10,274,894; 244,756 (WV)	Washington-Arlington-Alexandria, DC-VA-MD-WV MSA	6,465,724; 63,102 (WV)	Montgomery County, Maryland	1,074,582	Frederick-Gaithersburg-Bethesda, MD MD	1,377,465
Washington-Baltimore-Arlington, DC-MD-VA-WV-PA CSA	10,274,894; 244,756 (WV)	Washington-Arlington-Alexandria, DC-VA-MD-WV MSA	6,465,724; 63,102 (WV)	Frederick County, Maryland	302,883	Frederick-Gaithersburg-Bethesda, MD MD	1,377,465
Washington-Baltimore-Arlington, DC-MD-VA-WV-PA CSA	10,274,894; 244,756 (WV)	Baltimore-Columbia-Towson, MD MSA	2,857,781	Baltimore County, Maryland	847,650	none	
Washington-Baltimore-Arlington, DC-MD-VA-WV-PA CSA	10,274,894; 244,756 (WV)	Baltimore-Columbia-Towson, MD MSA	2,857,781	Anne Arundel County, Maryland	603,380	none	
Washington-Baltimore-Arlington, DC-MD-VA-WV-PA CSA	10,274,894; 244,756 (WV)	Baltimore-Columbia-Towson, MD MSA	2,857,781	Baltimore City, Maryland	569,997	none	
Washington-Baltimore-Arlington, DC-MD-VA-WV-PA CSA	10,274,894; 244,756 (WV)	Baltimore-Columbia-Towson, MD MSA	2,857,781	Howard County, Maryland	339,183	none	
Washington-Baltimore-Arlington, DC-MD-VA-WV-PA CSA	10,274,894; 244,756 (WV)	Baltimore-Columbia-Towson, MD MSA	2,857,781	Harford County, Maryland	266,446	none	
Washington-Baltimore-Arlington, DC-MD-VA-WV-PA CSA	10,274,894; 244,756 (WV)	Baltimore-Columbia-Towson, MD MSA	2,857,781	Carroll County, Maryland	176,677	none	
Washington-Baltimore-Arlington, DC-MD-VA-WV-PA CSA	10,274,894; 244,756 (WV)	Baltimore-Columbia-Towson, MD MSA	2,857,781	Queen Anne's County, Maryland	54,448	none	
Washington-Baltimore-Arlington, DC-MD-VA-WV-PA CSA	10,274,894; 244,756 (WV)	Hagerstown-Martinsburg, MD-WV MSA	315,280; 157,549 (WV)	Washington County, Maryland	157,731	none	
Washington-Baltimore-Arlington, DC-MD-VA-WV-PA CSA	10,274,894; 244,756 (WV)	Hagerstown-Martinsburg, MD-WV MSA	315,280; 157,549 (WV)	Berkeley County, West Virginia	139,522	none	
Washington-Baltimore-Arlington, DC-MD-VA-WV-PA CSA	10,274,894; 244,756 (WV)	Hagerstown-Martinsburg, MD-WV MSA	315,280; 157,549 (WV)	Morgan County, West Virginia	18,027	none	
Washington-Baltimore-Arlington, DC-MD-VA-WV-PA CSA	10,274,894; 244,756 (WV)	Lexington Park, MD MSA	211,176	St. Mary's County, Maryland	116,692	none	
Washington-Baltimore-Arlington, DC-MD-VA-WV-PA CSA	10,274,894; 244,756 (WV)	Lexington Park, MD MSA	211,176	Calvert County, Maryland	94,484	none	
Washington-Baltimore-Arlington, DC-MD-VA-WV-PA CSA	10,274,894; 244,756 (WV)	Chambersburg, PA MSA	160,652	Franklin County, Pennsylvania	160,652	none	
Washington-Baltimore-Arlington, DC-MD-VA-WV-PA CSA	10,274,894; 244,756 (WV)	Winchester, VA-WV MSA	152,332; 24,105 (WV)	Frederick County, Virginia	99,955	none	
Washington-Baltimore-Arlington, DC-MD-VA-WV-PA CSA	10,274,894; 244,756 (WV)	Winchester, VA-WV MSA	152,332; 24,105 (WV)	City of Winchester, Virginia	28,272	none	
Washington-Baltimore-Arlington, DC-MD-VA-WV-PA CSA	10,274,894; 244,756 (WV)	Winchester, VA-WV MSA	152,332; 24,105 (WV)	Hampshire County, West Virginia	24,105	none	
Washington-Baltimore-Arlington, DC-MD-VA-WV-PA CSA	10,274,894; 244,756 (WV)	Easton, MD μSA	38,238	Talbot County, Maryland	38,238	none	
Washington-Baltimore-Arlington, DC-MD-VA-WV-PA CSA	10,274,894; 244,756 (WV)	Lake of the Woods, VA μSA	40,083	Orange County, Virginia	40,083	none	
Washington-Baltimore-Arlington, DC-MD-VA-WV-PA CSA	10,274,894; 244,756 (WV)	Cambridge, MD μSA	33,628	Dorchester County, Maryland	33,628	none	
Fairmont-Clarksburg, WV CSA	143,726	Clarksburg, WV μSA	88,142	Harrison County, West Virginia	64,221	none	
Fairmont-Clarksburg, WV CSA	143,726	Clarksburg, WV μSA	88,142	Taylor County, West Virginia	16,287	none	
Fairmont-Clarksburg, WV CSA	143,726	Clarksburg, WV μSA	88,142	Doddridge County, West Virginia	7,634	none	
Fairmont-Clarksburg, WV CSA	143,726	Fairmont, WV μSA	55,584	Marion County, West Virginia	55,584	none	
none		Morgantown, WV MSA	141,995	Monongalia County, West Virginia	107,991	none	
none		Morgantown, WV MSA	141,995	Preston County, West Virginia	34,004	none	
none		Beckley, WV MSA	109,940	Raleigh County, West Virginia	71,775	none	
none		Beckley, WV MSA	109,940	Fayette County, West Virginia	38,165	none	
Parkersburg-Marietta-Vienna, WV-OH CSA	145,653; 87,264 (WV)	Parkersburg-Vienna, WV MSA	87,264	Wood County, West Virginia	82,385	none	
Parkersburg-Marietta-Vienna, WV-OH CSA	145,653; 87,264 (WV)	Parkersburg-Vienna, WV MSA	87,264	Wirt County, West Virginia	4,879	none	
Parkersburg-Marietta-Vienna, WV-OH CSA	145,653; 87,264 (WV)	Marietta, OH μSA	58,389	Washington County, Ohio	58,389	none	
none		Wheeling, WV-OH MSA	134,089; 69,655 (WV)	Belmont County, Ohio	64,434	none	
none		Wheeling, WV-OH MSA	134,089; 69,655 (WV)	Ohio County, West Virginia	40,496	none	
none		Wheeling, WV-OH MSA	134,089; 69,655 (WV)	Marshall County, West Virginia	29,159	none	
none		Bluefield, WV-VA μSA	96,138; 57,503 (WV)	Mercer County, West Virginia	57,503	none	
none		Bluefield, WV-VA μSA	96,138; 57,503 (WV)	Tazewell County, Virginia	38,635	none	
Pittsburgh-Weirton-Steubenville, PA-OH-WV CSA	2,725,198; 48,871 (WV)	Pittsburgh, PA MSA	2,421,992	Allegheny County, Pennsylvania	1,225,035	none	
Pittsburgh-Weirton-Steubenville, PA-OH-WV CSA	2,725,198; 48,871 (WV)	Pittsburgh, PA MSA	2,421,992	Westmoreland County, Pennsylvania	349,324	none	
Pittsburgh-Weirton-Steubenville, PA-OH-WV CSA	2,725,198; 48,871 (WV)	Pittsburgh, PA MSA	2,421,992	Washington County, Pennsylvania	210,802	none	
Pittsburgh-Weirton-Steubenville, PA-OH-WV CSA	2,725,198; 48,871 (WV)	Pittsburgh, PA MSA	2,421,992	Butler County, Pennsylvania	200,169	none	
Pittsburgh-Weirton-Steubenville, PA-OH-WV CSA	2,725,198; 48,871 (WV)	Pittsburgh, PA MSA	2,421,992	Beaver County, Pennsylvania	166,032	none	
Pittsburgh-Weirton-Steubenville, PA-OH-WV CSA	2,725,198; 48,871 (WV)	Pittsburgh, PA MSA	2,421,992	Fayette County, Pennsylvania	123,021	none	
Pittsburgh-Weirton-Steubenville, PA-OH-WV CSA	2,725,198; 48,871 (WV)	Pittsburgh, PA MSA	2,421,992	Lawrence County, Pennsylvania	83,911	none	
Pittsburgh-Weirton-Steubenville, PA-OH-WV CSA	2,725,198; 48,871 (WV)	Pittsburgh, PA MSA	2,421,992	Armstrong County, Pennsylvania	63,698	none	
Pittsburgh-Weirton-Steubenville, PA-OH-WV CSA	2,725,198; 48,871 (WV)	Weirton-Steubenville, WV-OH MSA	112,468; 48,871 (WV)	Jefferson County, Ohio	63,597	none	
Pittsburgh-Weirton-Steubenville, PA-OH-WV CSA	2,725,198; 48,871 (WV)	Weirton-Steubenville, WV-OH MSA	112,468; 48,871 (WV)	Hancock County, West Virginia	27,729	none	
Pittsburgh-Weirton-Steubenville, PA-OH-WV CSA	2,725,198; 48,871 (WV)	Weirton-Steubenville, WV-OH MSA	112,468; 48,871 (WV)	Brooke County, West Virginia	21,142	none	
Pittsburgh-Weirton-Steubenville, PA-OH-WV CSA	2,725,198; 48,871 (WV)	Hermitage, PA μSA	107,860	Mercer County, Pennsylvania	107,860	none	
Pittsburgh-Weirton-Steubenville, PA-OH-WV CSA	2,725,198; 48,871 (WV)	Indiana, PA μSA	82,878	Indiana County, Pennsylvania	82,878	none	
none		Elkins, WV μSA	26,882	Randolph County, West Virginia	26,882	none	
none		Cumberland, MD-WV μSA	93,640; 26,792 (WV)	Allegany County, Maryland	66,848	none	
none		Cumberland, MD-WV μSA	93,640; 26,792 (WV)	Mineral County, West Virginia	26,792	none	
none		none		Greenbrier County, West Virginia	31,578	none	
none		none		Logan County, West Virginia	30,375	none	
none		none		Jackson County, West Virginia	27,450	none	
none		none		Mason County, West Virginia	24,707	none	
none		none		Nicholas County, West Virginia	23,848	none	
none		none		Upshur County, West Virginia	23,758	none	
none		none		Mingo County, West Virginia	21,455	none	
none		none		Wyoming County, West Virginia	19,801	none	
none		none		Lincoln County, West Virginia	19,177	none	
none		none		McDowell County, West Virginia	16,878	none	
none		none		Lewis County, West Virginia	16,394	none	
none		none		Barbour County, West Virginia	15,414	none	
none		none		Hardy County, West Virginia	14,337	none	
none		none		Wetzel County, West Virginia	13,734	none	
none		none		Roane County, West Virginia	13,317	none	
none		none		Monroe County, West Virginia	12,491	none	
none		none		Braxton County, West Virginia	11,885	none	
none		none		Summers County, West Virginia	11,532	none	
none		none		Grant County, West Virginia	11,041	none	
none		none		Ritchie County, West Virginia	8,034	none	
none		none		Webster County, West Virginia	7,760	none	
none		none		Tyler County, West Virginia	7,881	none	
none		none		Pocahontas County, West Virginia	7,602	none	
none		none		Pleasants County, West Virginia	7,338	none	
none		none		Gilmer County, West Virginia	7,338	none	
none		none		Tucker County, West Virginia	6,540	none	
none		none		Pendleton County, West Virginia	5,826	none	
none		none		Calhoun County, West Virginia	5,978	none	
State of West Virginia					1,766,147	none	

The 15 core-based statistical areas of the State of West Virginia (Note: For CBSAs comprising populations from multiple states, they are listed twice to show both their intrastate population within that CBSA as well as the CBSA's total population. Only the intrastate population is ranked.)
2025 rank	Core-based statistical area	Population				
2025 rank	Core-based statistical area	2025 estimate	Change	2020 Census	Change	2010 Census
1	Charleston, WV MSA	200,170	−4.95%	210,605	−7.25%	227,078
2	Huntington-Ashland, WV-KY-OH MSA (WV)	185,377	−2.83%	190,772	−1.81%	194,286
3	Hagerstown-Martinsburg, MD-WV MSA (WV)	157,549	+13.23%	139,139	+14.32%	121,710
4	Morgantown, WV MSA	141,995	+1.40%	140,038	+7.96%	129,709
5	Beckley, WV MSA	109,940	−4.47%	115,079	−7.86%	124,898
6	Clarksburg, WV μSA	88,142	−2.53%	90,434	−3.99%	94,196
7	Parkersburg-Vienna, WV MSA	87,264	−2.49%	89,490	−3.43%	92,673
8	Wheeling, WV-OH MSA (WV)	69,655	−4.60%	73,016	−5.85%	77,550
9	Washington-Arlington-Alexandria, DC-VA-MD-WV MSA (WV)	63,102	+9.36%	57,701	+7.86%	53,498
10	Bluefield, WV-VA μSA (WV)	57,503	−3.62%	59,664	−4.18%	62,264
11	Fairmont, WV μSA	55,584	−1.10%	56,205	−0.38%	56,418
12	Weirton-Steubenville, WV-OH MSA (WV)	48,871	−5.39%	51,654	−5.65%	54,745
13	Elkins, WV μSA	26,882	−3.76%	27,932	−5.01%	29,405
14	Cumberland, MD-WV μSA (WV)	26,792	−0.54%	26,938	−4.52%	28,212
15	Winchester, VA-WV MSA (WV)	24,105	+4.38%	23,093	−3.63%	23,964
	Bluefield, WV-VA μSA	96,138	−3.95%	100,093	−6.75%	107,342
	Cumberland, MD-WV μSA	93,640	−1.48%	95,044	−7.99%	103,299
	Hagerstown-Martinsburg, MD-WV MSA	315,280	+7.30%	293,844	+9.18%	269,140
	Huntington-Ashland, WV-KY-OH MSA	365,965	−2.71%	376,155	−2.74%	386,768
	Washington-Arlington-Alexandria, DC-VA-MD-WV MSA	6,465,724	+2.98%	6,278,542	+13.18%	5,547,495
	Weirton-Steubenville, WV-OH MSA	112,468	−3.79%	116,903	−6.07%	124,454
	Wheeling, WV-OH MSA	134,089	−3.89%	139,513	−5.70%	147,950
	Winchester, VA-WV MSA	152,332	+6.80%	142,632	+11.02%	128,472

The five combined statistical areas of the State of West Virginia (Note: For CSAs comprising populations from multiple states, they are listed twice to show both their intrastate population within that CSA as well as the CSA's total population. Only the intrastate population is ranked.)
2025 rank	Combined statistical area	Population				
2025 rank	Combined statistical area	2025 estimate	Change	2020 Census	Change	2010 Census
1	Charleston-Huntington-Ashland, WV-OH-KY CSA (WV)	385,547	−3.94%	401,377	−4.74%	421,364
2	Washington-Baltimore-Arlington, DC-MD-VA-WV-PA CSA (WV)	244,756	+11.29%	219,933	+10.42%	199,172
3	Clarksburg-Fairmont, WV CSA	143,726	−1.99%	146,639	−2.64%	150,614
4	Parkersburg-Marietta-Vienna, WV-OH CSA (WV)	87,264	−2.49%	89,490	−3.43%	92,673
5	Pittsburgh-Weirton-Steubenville, PA-OH-WV CSA (WV)	48,871	−5.39%	51,654	−5.65%	54,745
	Charleston-Huntington-Ashland, WV-OH-KY CSA	637,500	−3.52%	660,768	−4.70%	693,345
	Parkersburg-Marietta-Vienna, WV-OH CSA	145,653	−2.42%	149,261	−3.36%	154,451
	Pittsburgh-Weirton-Steubenville, PA-OH-WV CSA	2,725,198	−1.54%	2,767,801	−0.34%	2,777,365
	Washington-Baltimore-Arlington, DC-MD-VA-WV-PA CSA	10,274,894	+2.46%	10,028,331	+10.17%	9,102,983

== See also ==
- Geography of West Virginia
  - Demographics of West Virginia
