= Simpson, West Virginia =

Simpson
- Unincorporated community
- Location within the state of West Virginia Simpson (the United States)
- Coordinates: 39°16′0″N 80°5′36″W
- Country: United States
- State: West Virginia
- County: Taylor
- Elevation: 1,066 ft (325 m)
- Time zone: UTC-5 (Eastern (EST))
  - Summer (DST): UTC-4 (EDT)
- ZIP code: 26435
- GNIS feature ID: 1546810

Simpson is an unincorporated community in Taylor County, West Virginia, United States.

== History ==
The community was named for nearby Simpson Creek. The creek was named for John Simpson, an 18th-century hunter and trapper who traveled through the region.

== Notable people ==
Randal McCloy is a native of Simpson and was the sole survivor of the 2006 Sago Mine disaster at Sago in Upshur County.

== Location ==
Simpson is located east of Flemington along the Right Fork Simpson Creek on County Route 13 in proximity to Tygart Lake State Park. Simpson also has its own post office, established in 1885 and currently in operation. The community takes its name from nearby Simpson Creek.
