= Hepzibah, West Virginia =

Hepzibah, West Virginia may refer to:

- Hepzibah, Harrison County, West Virginia, an unincorporated community in Harrison County
- Hepzibah, Taylor County, West Virginia, an unincorporated community in Taylor County
