= Elliotsville =

Elliotsville may refer to:

- Calumet, Ohio, and unincorporated community in Jefferson County known as Elliotsville prior to about 1880
- Elliotsville, West Virginia, an unincorporated community in Taylor County
