= South Grafton =

South Grafton may refer to:

- South Grafton, Massachusetts
- South Grafton, New South Wales
- South Grafton, West Virginia
