= Lesmalinston, West Virginia =

Lesmalinston
- Unincorporated community
- Location within the state of West Virginia Lesmalinston (the United States)
- Coordinates: 39°20′20″N 79°58′11″W
- Country: United States
- State: West Virginia
- County: Taylor
- Elevation: 1,037 ft (316 m)
- Time zone: UTC-5 (Eastern (EST))
  - Summer (DST): UTC-4 (EDT)
- GNIS ID: 1554945

Lesmalinston is an unincorporated community in Taylor County, West Virginia, United States.
