= Henry Simon (general) =

United States Air Force general (1921–2016)

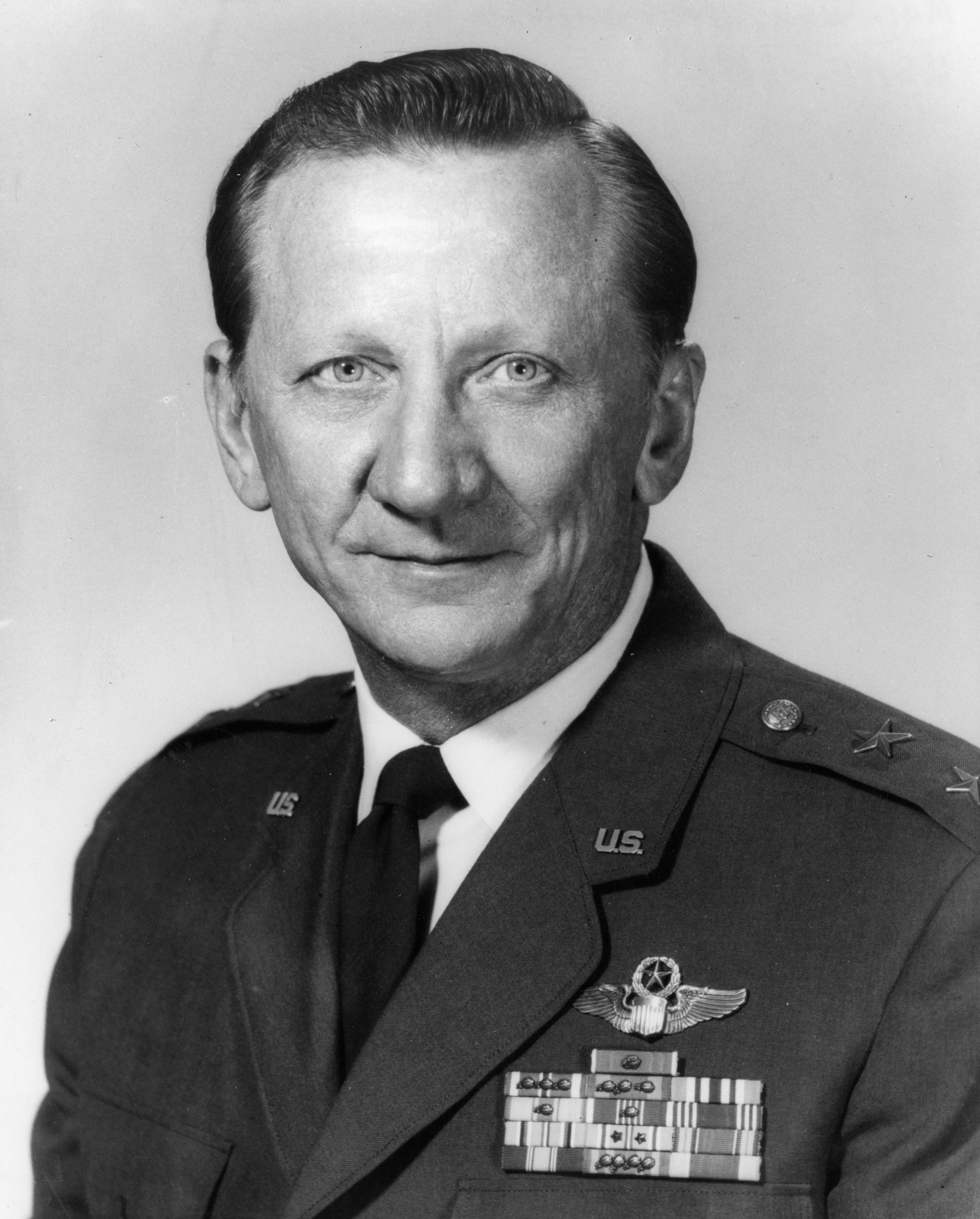
- Born: February 12, 1921; Rosemont, West Virginia, U.S.
- Died: October 9, 2016 (aged 95) Crystal River, Florida, U.S.
- Allegiance: United States of America
- Branch: United States Air Force
- Service years: 1942–1976
- Rank: Major general
- Commands: Defense Supply Agency
- Conflicts: World War II

Henry Simon (February 12, 1921 – October 9, 2016) was a United States Air Force major general who served as deputy director of the Defense Supply Agency.

== Biography ==
Henry Simon was born in Rosemont, West Virginia on February 12, 1921. He graduated from Cranford High School in Cranford, New Jersey, earned a bachelor's degree in 1948 from Rutgers University and earned two graduate degrees from George Washington University.

Simon retired in 1976, and lived in Crystal River, Florida, where he died on October 9, 2016, at the age of 95.
