= Maple Run, Taylor County, West Virginia =

Maple Run
- Unincorporated community
- Location within the state of West Virginia Maple Run (the United States)
- Coordinates: 39°20′7″N 79°54′14″W
- Country: United States
- State: West Virginia
- County: Taylor
- Elevation: 1,322 ft (403 m)
- Time zone: UTC-5 (Eastern (EST))
  - Summer (DST): UTC-4 (EDT)
- GNIS ID: 1689896

Maple Run is an unincorporated community in Taylor County, West Virginia, United States.
