= Knottsville =

Knottsville may refer to:

- Knottsville, Kentucky, an unincorporated community in eastern Daviess County
- Knottsville, West Virginia, an unincorporated community in Taylor County
