= Westerman, West Virginia =

Westerman
- Unincorporated community
- Location within the state of West Virginia Westerman (the United States)
- Coordinates: 39°21′21″N 79°55′59″W
- Country: United States
- State: West Virginia
- County: Taylor
- Elevation: 1,050 ft (320 m)
- Time zone: UTC-5 (Eastern (EST))
  - Summer (DST): UTC-4 (EDT)
- GNIS ID: 1689910

Westerman is an unincorporated community in Taylor County, West Virginia, United States.
