= Clelland House =

Historic house in West Virginia, United States

- U.S. National Register of Historic Places
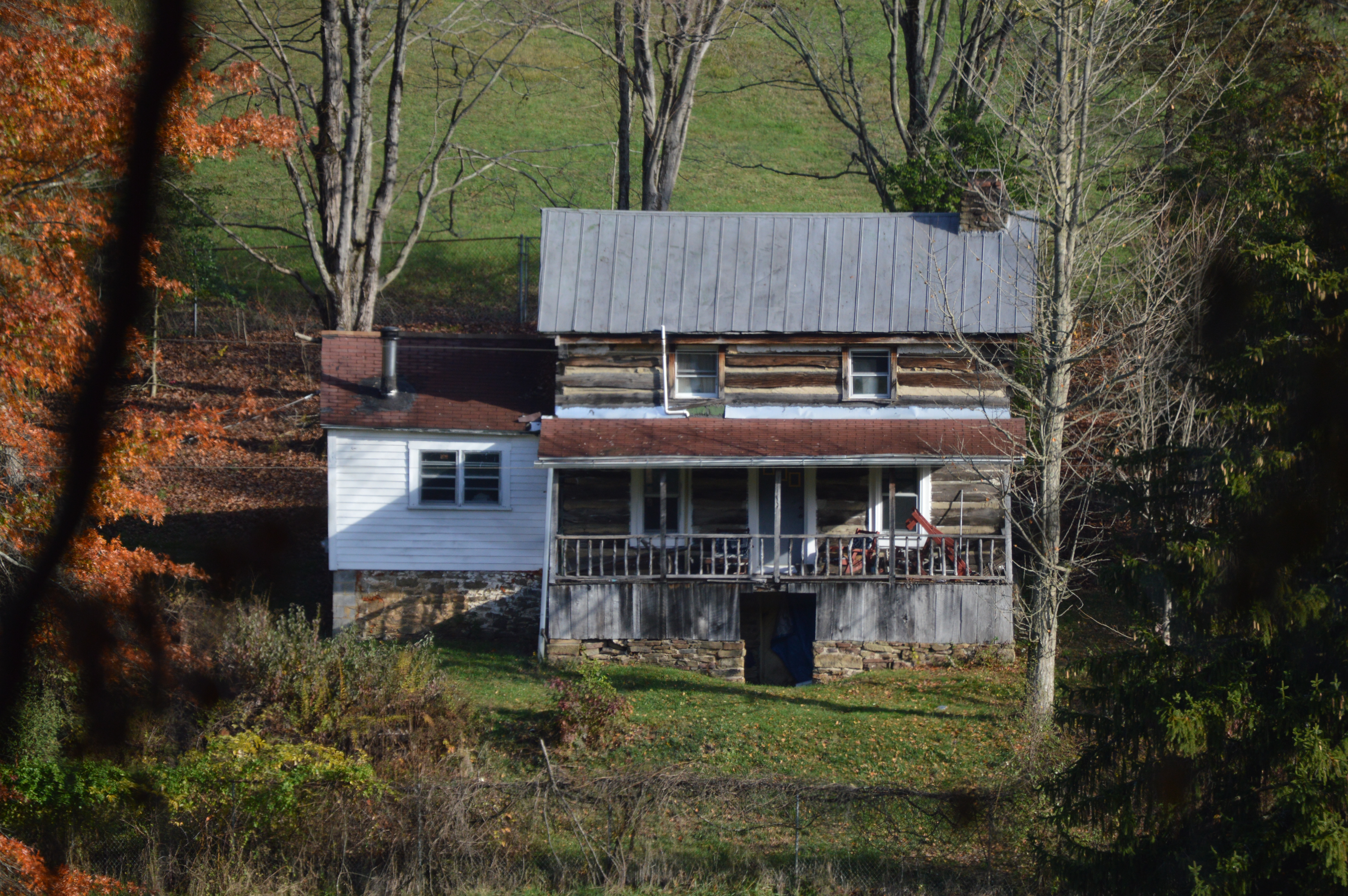
- Distant view from River Run Road

- Location within West Virginia Location within the United States
- Location: Off County Route 250/4, near Grafton, West Virginia
- Coordinates: 39°23′38″N 80°9′10″W
- Area: 1.5 acres (0.61 ha)
- Built: 1800
- Architect: Clelland, Rev. James
- Architectural style: Scotch-Irish Plan
- NRHP reference No.: 80004043
- Added to NRHP: June 23, 1980

Clelland House, also known as the Houghton House and Clelland-Houghton-Wallace Log House, is a historic home located near Grafton, Taylor County, West Virginia. It was built about 1800, and consists of a two-story main section constructed of "V"-notched logs, with a one-story frame kitchen wing. It was designed with one chimney and one large room on each floor. It is the oldest surviving house in the area.

It was listed on the National Register of Historic Places in 1980.
