= Bluefield micropolitan area =

Micropolitan area in Bluefield, WV

Bluefield, WV–VA Bluefield, WV–VA Micropolitan Statistical Area
- Micropolitan Statistical Area
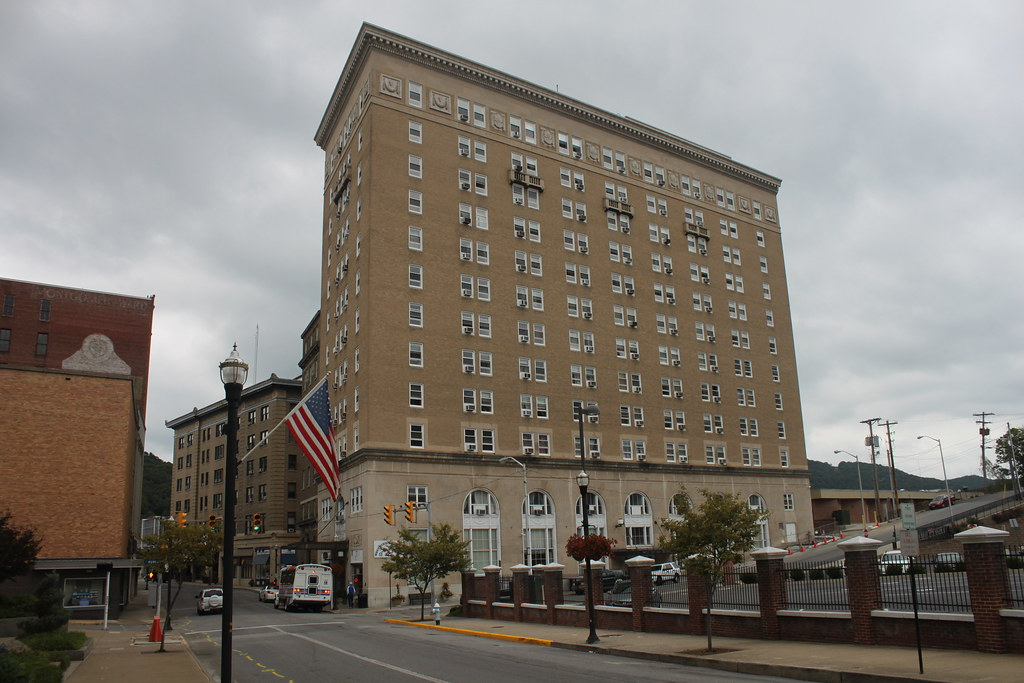
- Bluefield Downtown Commercial Historic District
Interactive Map of Bluefield, WV–VA μSA
City of Bluefield, WV
Bluefield, WV–VA μSA
- Country: United States
- State: West Virginia; Virginia
- Largest city: Bluefield, WV
- Other municipalities: Princeton, WV Richlands, VA Bluefield, VA
- Time zone: UTC−5 (EST)
  - Summer (DST): UTC−4 (EDT)

The Bluefield Micropolitan Statistical Area, as defined by the United States Census Bureau, is an area consisting of two counties – one in West Virginia and one in Virginia – anchored by the town of Bluefield, West Virginia.

As of the 2010 census, the μSA had a population of 107,342.

== Counties ==
- Mercer County, West Virginia
- Tazewell County, Virginia

== Communities ==
- Places with 5,000 to 10,000 inhabitants
  - Bluefield, West Virginia (Principal city)
  - Bluefield, Virginia
  - Princeton, West Virginia
  - Richlands, Virginia
- Places with 1,000 to 5,000 inhabitants
  - Athens, West Virginia
  - Cedar Bluff, Virginia
  - Claypool Hill, Virginia (Census-designated place)
  - Tazewell, Virginia
- Places with less than 1,000 inhabitants
  - Bramwell, West Virginia
  - Matoaka, West Virginia
  - Montcalm, West Virginia (census-designated place)
  - Oakvale, West Virginia
  - Pocahontas, Virginia
- Unincorporated places
  - Burke's Garden, Virginia

== Demographics ==
As of the census of 2010, there were 107,342 people, 44,052 households, and 30,053 families residing within the μSA. The racial makeup of the μSA was 94.2% White, 5.5% African American, 0.6% Native American, 0.7% Asian, 0.0% Pacific Islander, 0.3% from other races, and 0.1% from two or more races. Hispanic or Latino of any race were 0.7% of the population.

In 2000 the median income for a household in the μSA was $31,841, and the median income for a family was $40,315. The per capita income for the μSA was $17,638.

== See also ==
- West Virginia census statistical areas
- Virginia census statistical areas
