= Wendel, West Virginia =

- Unincorporated community
- Location within West Virginia Location within the United States
- Coordinates: 39°17′47″N 80°06′19″W
- Country: United States
- State: West Virginia
- County: Taylor
- Elevation: 1,184 ft (361 m)
- Time zone: UTC-5 (Eastern (EST))
  - Summer (DST): UTC-4 (EDT)
- Area codes: 304 & 681
- GNIS feature ID: 1555939

Wendel is an unincorporated community in Taylor County, West Virginia, United States. Wendel is located on County Route 11, 2.5 miles (4.0 km) northeast of Flemington.
