= Rector College =

Former Baptist-affiliated college in Pruntytown, Virginia (now West Virginia), USA

- Former names: Western Virginia Educational Society
- Type: Private university
- Active: 1839–1855
- Religious affiliation: Baptist
- Academic staff: 4 (1839)
- Students: 72 (1839); 110 (1840)
- Location: Pruntytown, West Virginia, U.S. 39°20′02″N 80°04′36″W
- Campus: Rural

Rector College — or Rector College and Girls’ Seminary — was a pioneering Baptist college in Pruntytown, Taylor County, western (now West) Virginia. It was founded in 1839 and discontinued its operations in 1855.

== History ==
Elder Joshua Bradley (1773-1855), a 1799 graduate of Brown University, had been active in Baptist ministry and education in western Virginia since the early 1830s. In March 1838, he and others in the Western Virginia Educational Society (a Baptist association) successfully petitioned the Virginia General Assembly for a charter for a new college to be established at Williamsport. On May 17, 1839, Rev. Bradley, as general agent for the WVES, met with Rev. Enoch Rector (1804-1898), a wealthy Baptist preacher, at Marietta, Ohio. (Rector had made his fortune in real estate speculation and development in Ohio.) He agreed to fund a new college and seminary at Williamsport (officially called Pruntytown after 1845) in collaboration with the local congregation at Beulah Baptist Church. (This was the most influential Baptist congregation in the region, with the largest and wealthiest membership.) The result was Rector College and Girls’ Seminary, which was established later that year and chartered in 1842. Under the presidency of Bradley, and later that of Rev. Charles A.M. Wheeler (1784-1851), the college flourished for several years with a student body numbering in the hundreds. (Bradley and Wheeler shared a background as accomplished ministers and intellectuals from New England.)

Three developments spelled the end for Rector College. First, in the summer and autumn of 1850, a typhoid fever epidemic swept through the Pruntytown area and significantly disrupted classes. Second, during the same seasons, Wheeler's health began to decline dramatically, not from typhoid, but probably due to tuberculosis; he died on July 11, 1851. Finally, on March 25, 1855, a disastrous fire destroyed the college's buildings including its large library and a museum. The institution never reopened.
