= Pruntytown Correctional Center =

State prison for West Virginia

Coordinates: 39°19′47″N 80°04′26″W

- Interactive map of Pruntytown Correctional Center
- Location: 2006 Trap Springs Road Grafton, West Virginia
- Status: open
- Security class: minimum
- Capacity: 369
- Opened: 1985
- Managed by: West Virginia Division of Corrections and Rehabilitation

Pruntytown Correctional Center (PCC) is a state prison for West Virginia, located at Pruntytown near Grafton, West Virginia, USA.

The premises were previously used for a juvenile detention center known as the West Virginia Industrial Home for Boys, which closed in 1983. Juvenile prisoners were then transferred to the West Virginia Industrial Home for Youth at Industrial near Salem.

PCC was opened in 1985 on those grounds. The initial intake consisted of minimum custody adult male inmates whose primary work function was to renovate the facility

== Women prisoners ==
In November 1988 thirty-two state adult female prisoners, were moved to PCC from their previous accommodation within the federal prison system in Alderson Federal Prison Camp at Alderson, West Virginia, making PCC the State of West Virginia's first adult mixed-sex prison.

In January 2007 all female prisoners at PCC were transferred to Lakin Correctional Center, a multi-security female correctional facility located near Point Pleasant in Mason County, West Virginia constructed in 2003. PCC no longer houses female prisoners.

== Male prisoners ==
The male population has a capacity of 369 inmates, including a 24-bed substance abuse treatment unit and an additional 24 beds designated as pre-treatment. The male population consists of low public risk inmates (levels 1, 2, and several 3's) received directly from the regional jails and minimum and medium security inmates from Huttonsville Correctional Center, Denmar Correctional Center and St. Marys Correctional Center.
