= West Virginia Industrial Home for Boys =

Juvenile detention center in Grafton, West Virginia

Coordinates: 39°19′47″N 80°04′26″W

- Interactive map of West Virginia Industrial Home for Boys
- Location: 2006 Trap Springs Road Grafton, West Virginia
- Status: Closed
- Security class: Minimum
- Opened: 1891
- Closed: 1983
- Managed by: West Virginia Division of Corrections

The West Virginia Industrial Home for Boys was, from 1891 to 1983, the state juvenile detention center for male offenders, located at Pruntytown near Grafton, West Virginia.

Young male offenders, aged 12 to 20 years, were sentenced to the facility beginning in 1891. Sentencing was by the juvenile courts, or justices of the peace, for incorrigibility and immorality, and by the criminal courts for felonies. The facility was crowded in the 1950s. Inmates escaped over the years, and attempted escapes were a regular occurrence.

Changes in philosophy regarding youth incarceration, beginning in the 1970s, led to population declines at the industrial home, and at its sister institution, the West Virginia Industrial Home for Girls, which had opened in 1899 at Salem. In 1983, the Industrial School for Boys closed, the girls’ facility was redesignated as the West Virginia Industrial Home for Youth, and the boys were transferred to it.

The Pruntytown Correctional Center (PCC), a state prison for adult offenders, opened in 1985 on the old grounds of the former industrial home. A veterans' cemetery was also established on the home's site in the 1980s.
