= Oreide, West Virginia =

Oreide
- Unincorporated community
- Location within the state of West Virginia Oreide (the United States)
- Coordinates: 39°21′40″N 80°11′59″W
- Country: United States
- State: West Virginia
- County: Taylor
- Elevation: 1,050 ft (320 m)
- Time zone: UTC-5 (Eastern (EST))
  - Summer (DST): UTC-4 (EDT)
- GNIS ID: 1555269

Oreide is an unincorporated community in Taylor County, West Virginia, United States.
