= Park View, West Virginia =

Park View
- Unincorporated community
- Location within the state of West Virginia Park View (the United States)
- Coordinates: 39°19′3″N 80°1′41″W
- Country: United States
- State: West Virginia
- County: Taylor
- Elevation: 1,011 ft (308 m)
- Time zone: UTC-5 (Eastern (EST))
  - Summer (DST): UTC-4 (EDT)
- GNIS ID: 1555306

Park View is an unincorporated community in Taylor County, West Virginia, United States.
