= Charles Henry Ambler =

American historian, teacher, professor and civil servant

- Born: August 12, 1876; New Matamoras, Ohio, U.S.
- Died: August 31, 1957 (aged 81); Ashland, Virginia, U.S.
- Resting place: Lawnwood Cemetery, Morgantown, West Virginia
- Occupations: Historian, Professor of history, Civil Servant, Sheriff
- Spouse: Helen Mary Carle / Ambler
- Children: Mary Elizabeth Ambler; Mary Louise Ambler

Charles Henry Ambler (August 12, 1876 – August 31, 1957) was an American historian, teacher, professor and civil servant. As a historian he was an accomplished writer of Virginia and West Virginia history, publishing many works on those subjects. Ambler is noted for his expertise on the American Civil War in how it brought about the formation of West Virginia. He was also noted for his approach in applying modern research techniques in the study of West Virginia's history, and was complimented by his contemporaries of belonging to the "modern school of historians". During his career as a historian and professor Ambler had authored and published numerous works on Colonial Virginia, the states of Virginia and West Virginia before and during the American Civil War, along with publications about the colonial move westward.

== Early life and education ==
Charles Henry Ambler was born on August 12, 1876, in Matamoras, Ohio. His boyhood days were spent in St. Marys, West Virginia. He married Helen Mary Carle in 1920, who also attended West Virginia University; their marriage bringing two children, Mary Elizabeth and Mary Louise.

Ambler was a teacher in Pleasants County, West Virginia public school from 1894 to 1900. He attended West Liberty University. He was elected sheriff of Pleasants County and served in 1900–1901. In 1901 he enrolled at West Virginia University, where he earned an AB in social sciences, and a MA, in 1904 and 1905 respectively. He thereafter attended the University of Wisconsin, and became acquainted with Frederick Jackson Turner, noted for his famous, yet historically controversial, Frontier Thesis. Ambler earned his doctorate in history in 1908, using the first eight chapters of his work, Sectionalism in Virginia from 1776 to 1861 (1910), for his dissertation. Ambler went on to teach political science and history at Randolph-Macon College in Virginia until 1917. During his tenure there he met J. M. Battin, a former student of the college, who was in possession of the long forgotten diary of John Floyd, 25th Governor of Virginia, from 1830 to 1834, which Ambler made extensive use of when he wrote Floyd's biography. In writing the biography Ambler received helpful assistance from Doctor George B. Johnston, and Ann Mason Lee, both from Richmond, who were direct descendants of Floyd.

In the following thirty years Ambler was a member of the West Virginia University history department, and served as its chairman from 1929 until 1946. He created the West Virginia and Regional History Collection in West Virginia's university library.

== Later life ==
Ambler was the president of the Mississippi Valley Historical Association in 1942–43 and received numerous other recognitions of this sort. As a member of the West Virginia House of Delegates, he represented Monongalia County from 1951 until 1955. Ambler was a leading authority on the history of education in pre-statehood West Virginia in the 19th century, and noted that the failures in the free school system of the 1840s was due to the inefficiency of the state legislature and its failure to enact special laws.

Ambler's 1958 work, (Note: Published the year after his death) entitled, West Virginia, the Mountain State, (1958), is a rewriting and further elaboration of his earlier work, A History of West Virginia, (1933). Here he discusses the prominent geological divisions, i.e.the vast mountain ranges that divided the original region of Virginia, and how they led to the social divisions and sectionalism that, after years of political and Constitutional debate, led to the creation and establishment of the State of West Virginia.

Ambler also belonged to the American Geographical Society, the Masonic Order, and the International Order of Odd Fellows. Among Ambler's most notable legacies was his efforts in the creating the West Virginia and Regional History Collection in the West Virginia University library.

Charles Ambler died on August 31, 1957, aged 81. He is buried at Lawnwood Cemetery, Morgantown, Monogalia County, West Virginia.

== Works ==
Charles Ambler has authored at least 50 works in 198 publications. Some of his works were published after his death. His works involved considerable research, exploring numerous topics that previously had received little attention from historians.

Selected works:

- Disfranchisement in West Virginia. I. and II. (1906)
- Sectionalism in Virginia from 1776 to 1861 (1910)
- Thomas Ritchie; a study in Virginia politics (1913)
- The life and diary of John Floyd, governor of Virginia : an apostle of secession and the father of the Oregon country (1918)
- (ed.) Correspondence of Robert M. T. Hunter, 1826–1876 (1918)
- A history of transportation in the Ohio valley, with special reference to its waterways, trade, and commerce from the earliest period to the present time (1932)
- A History of West Virginia (1933)
- George Washington and the West (1936)
- Francis H. Pierpont, Union War Governor of Virginia and father of West Virginia (1937)
- Recollections of war and peace, 1861-1868 (1938)
- West Virginia, the Mountain State (1940, reprinted 1958)
- West Virginia; stories and biographies (1942)
- The makers of West Virginia and their work (1942)
- A history of education in West Virginia; from early Colonial times to 1949 (1951)

== See also ==
- History of West Virginia
- Thomas Perkins Abernethy - specialized in frontier history, and a contemporary of Charles Ambler
- James Kendall Hosmer - American historian of the American Civil War and librarian

== Sources ==
- Ambler, Charles Henry (1910). Sectionalism in Virginia from 1776 to 1861. Chicago : University of Chicago Press.
- —— (1918). The life and diary of John Floyd, governor of Virginia. Richmond, Richmond Press, Inc.
- —— (2019) [1936]. George Washington and the West. UNC Press Books. ISBN 9781469643878.
- Buck, Solon J. (1934). "A History of West Virginia. By Charles Henry Ambler". The Mississippi Valley Historical Review. 21 (1): 114–116. doi:10.2307/1896438. JSTOR 1896438.
- Plummer, Kenneth Moses (1965). A history of West Virginia Wesleyan College, 1890-1965. West Virginia Wesleyan College Press.
- Rice, Otis K. (September 24, 2012). "Charles Henry Ambler". The West Virginia Encyclopedia.
- —— (2015). The Allegheny Frontier: West Virginia Beginnings, 1730--1830. University Press of Kentucky. ISBN 978-0-8131-6438-0.
- "Ambler, Charles Henry 1876-1957". WorldCat Identities. 2019.
- Leonard, John William; Marquis, Albert Nelson (1914). Who was who in America with world notables : volume VIII. Chicago, Ill. : Marquis Who's Who. ISBN 9780837902142.
- West Virginia University Bulletin, Issue 2. West Virginia University. 1923.
