= Thornton, West Virginia =

Thornton
- Unincorporated community
- Location within the state of West Virginia Thornton (the United States)
- Coordinates: 39°20′44″N 79°56′31″W
- Country: United States
- State: West Virginia
- County: Taylor
- Elevation: 1,043 ft (318 m)
- Time zone: UTC-5 (Eastern (EST))
  - Summer (DST): UTC-4 (EDT)
- ZIP code: 26440
- Area codes: 304 and 681
- GNIS feature ID: 1548055

Thornton is an unincorporated community in Taylor County, West Virginia, United States. Thornton is located on Three Fork Creek along the Northwestern Turnpike (US 50) at its junction with County Route 7. Thornton also hosts an annual Pumpkin Festival. Thornton contains a Volunteer Fire Department, Post Office, and Taylor County's Judge Alan Moats' residence.

After his 1976 escape from prison in Pennsylvania, the sex cult leader George Feigley hid on a farm near Thornton. He and his followers referred to the farm as the "Aaron Farm", and used it as a compound until Feigley was recaptured in 1978.

== Historic site ==
- Thornton United Methodist Church (1912)
