= Tappan, West Virginia =

Tappan
- Unincorporated community
- Location within the state of West Virginia Tappan (the United States)
- Coordinates: 39°22′34″N 80°9′29″W
- Country: United States
- State: West Virginia
- County: Taylor
- Elevation: 1,053 ft (321 m)
- Time zone: UTC-5 (Eastern (EST))
  - Summer (DST): UTC-4 (EDT)
- GNIS ID: 1555782

Tappan is an unincorporated community in Taylor County, West Virginia, United States.
