= Belgium, West Virginia =

Unincorporated community in West Virginia, United States

Belgium
- Unincorporated community
- Location within the state of West Virginia Belgium (the United States)
- Coordinates: 39°19′25″N 80°6′58″W
- Country: United States
- State: West Virginia
- County: Taylor
- Elevation: 1,119 ft (341 m)
- Time zone: UTC-5 (Eastern (EST))
  - Summer (DST): UTC-4 (EDT)
- GNIS feature ID: 1553843

Belgium is an unincorporated community in Taylor County, West Virginia, United States.
