= Astor, West Virginia =

Unincorporated community in West Virginia, United States

Astor
- Unincorporated community
- Location within the state of West Virginia Astor (the United States)
- Coordinates: 39°14′25″N 80°8′28″W
- Country: United States
- State: West Virginia
- County: Taylor
- Elevation: 1,099 ft (335 m)
- Time zone: UTC-5 (Eastern (EST))
  - Summer (DST): UTC-4 (EDT)
- GNIS ID: 1553761

Astor is an unincorporated community in Taylor County, West Virginia, United States.
