= Blueville, West Virginia =

Unincorporated community in West Virginia, United States

Blueville
- Unincorporated community
- Location within the state of West Virginia Blueville (the United States)
- Coordinates: 39°20′46″N 80°0′12″W
- Country: United States
- State: West Virginia
- County: Taylor
- Elevation: 1,188 ft (362 m)
- Time zone: UTC-5 (Eastern (EST))
  - Summer (DST): UTC-4 (EDT)
- GNIS ID: 1536149

Blueville is an unincorporated community in Taylor County, West Virginia, United States.

The community was named for the local Blue family.
