= Santiago, West Virginia =

Santiago
- Unincorporated community
- Location within the state of West Virginia Santiago (the United States)
- Coordinates: 39°22′11″N 80°12′5″W
- Country: United States
- State: West Virginia
- County: Taylor
- Elevation: 1,034 ft (315 m)
- Time zone: UTC-5 (Eastern (EST))
  - Summer (DST): UTC-4 (EDT)
- GNIS ID: 1546427

Santiago is an unincorporated community in Taylor County, West Virginia, United States.
