= Brownlow, West Virginia =

Unincorporated community in West Virginia, United States

Brownlow
- Unincorporated community
- Location within the state of West Virginia Brownlow (the United States)
- Coordinates: 39°21′5″N 79°59′48″W
- Country: United States
- State: West Virginia
- County: Taylor
- Elevation: 1,240 ft (380 m)
- Time zone: UTC-5 (Eastern (EST))
  - Summer (DST): UTC-4 (EDT)
- GNIS ID: 1553989

Brownlow is an unincorporated community in Taylor County, West Virginia, United States.
