= West Grafton, West Virginia =

West Grafton
- Unincorporated community
- Location within the state of West Virginia West Grafton (the United States)
- Coordinates: 39°20′13″N 80°1′31″W
- Country: United States
- State: West Virginia
- County: Taylor
- Elevation: 997 ft (304 m)
- Time zone: UTC-5 (Eastern (EST))
  - Summer (DST): UTC-4 (EDT)
- GNIS ID: 1555944

West Grafton is an unincorporated community in Taylor County, West Virginia, United States.
