= McGee, West Virginia =

McGee
- Unincorporated community
- Location within the state of West Virginia McGee (the United States)
- Coordinates: 39°21′39″N 80°7′39″W
- Country: United States
- State: West Virginia
- County: Taylor
- Elevation: 1,365 ft (416 m)
- Time zone: UTC-5 (Eastern (EST))
  - Summer (DST): UTC-4 (EDT)
- GNIS ID: 1542997

McGee is an unincorporated community in Taylor County, West Virginia, United States.
