= Millertown, West Virginia =

Millertown
- Unincorporated community
- Location within the state of West Virginia Millertown (the United States)
- Coordinates: 39°17′59″N 79°57′32″W
- Country: United States
- State: West Virginia
- County: Taylor
- Elevation: 1,460 ft (450 m)
- Time zone: UTC-5 (Eastern (EST))
  - Summer (DST): UTC-4 (EDT)
- GNIS ID: 1543404

Millertown is an unincorporated community in Taylor County, West Virginia, United States.
