= Lucretia, West Virginia =

Lucretia
- Unincorporated community
- Location within the state of West Virginia Lucretia (the United States)
- Coordinates: 39°19′46″N 80°0′4″W
- Country: United States
- State: West Virginia
- County: Taylor
- Elevation: 1,204 ft (367 m)
- Time zone: UTC-5 (Eastern (EST))
  - Summer (DST): UTC-4 (EDT)
- GNIS ID: 1542609

Lucretia is an unincorporated community in Taylor County, West Virginia, United States.
