= Hepzibah, Taylor County, West Virginia =

Hepzibah, West Virginia
- Unincorporated community
- Location within West Virginia Location within the United States
- Coordinates: 39°21′00″N 80°10′08″W
- Country: United States
- State: West Virginia
- County: Taylor
- Elevation: 1,161 ft (354 m)
- Time zone: UTC-5 (Eastern (EST))
  - Summer (DST): UTC-4 (EDT)
- Area codes: 304 & 681
- GNIS feature ID: 1549734

Hepzibah is an unincorporated community in Taylor County, West Virginia, United States. Hepzibah is located 6.5 miles (10.5 km) northeast of Bridgeport.
