= Elliotsville, West Virginia =

Unincorporated community in West Virginia, United States

Elliotsville
- Unincorporated community
- Location within the state of West Virginia Elliotsville (the United States)
- Coordinates: 39°17′22″N 80°2′44″W
- Country: United States
- State: West Virginia
- County: Taylor
- Elevation: 1,043 ft (318 m)
- Time zone: UTC-5 (Eastern (EST))
  - Summer (DST): UTC-4 (EDT)
- GNIS ID: 1689778

Elliotsville is an unincorporated community in Taylor County, West Virginia, United States.
