= Tygart Lake State Park =

State Park in Taylor County, West Virginia

- IUCN category III (natural monument or feature)
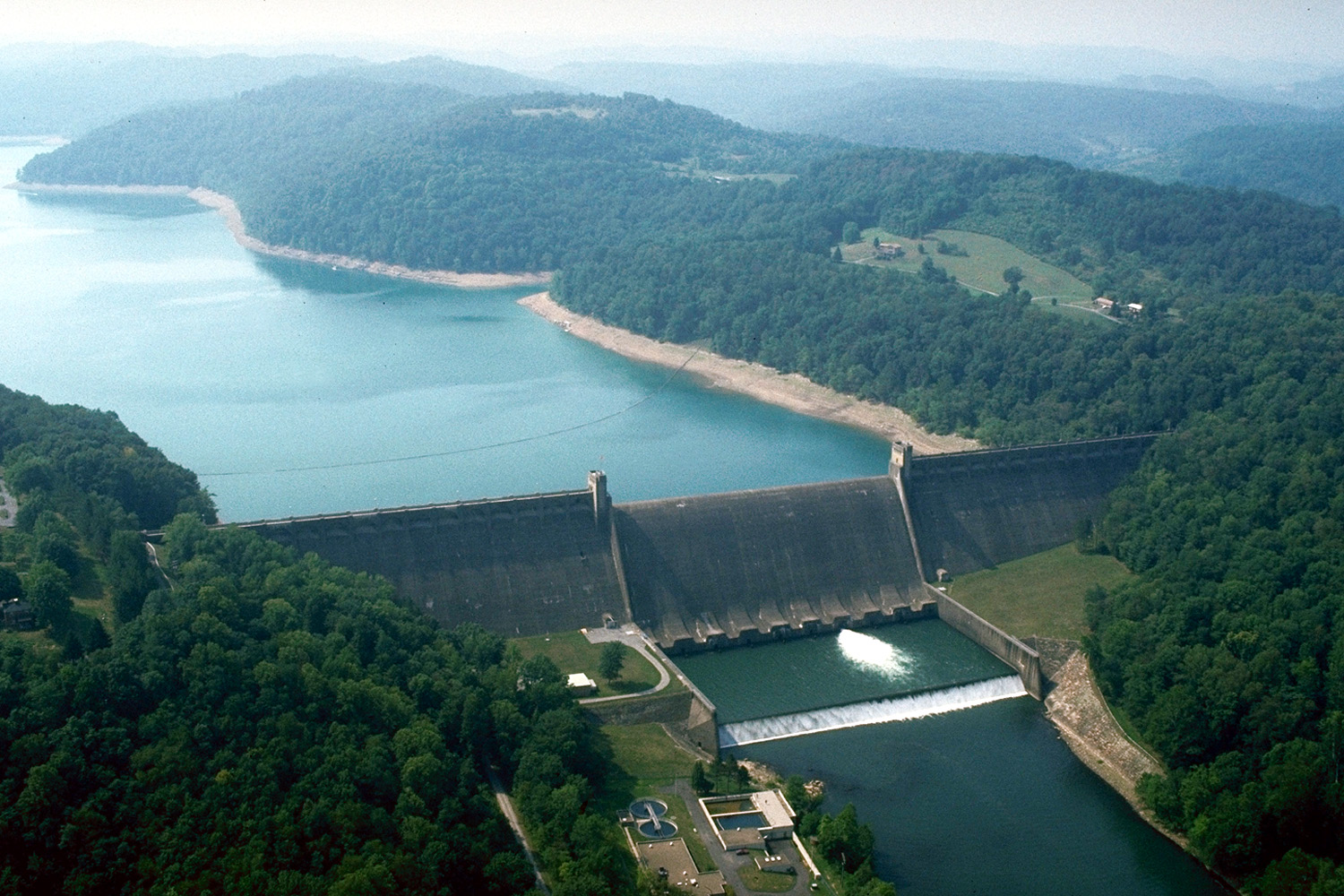
- Tygart Lake

- Location within West Virginia
- Location: Taylor, West Virginia, United States
- Nearest city: Grafton, West Virginia
- Coordinates: 39°18′16″N 80°01′20″W
- Length: 1.6 km (0.99 mi)
- Area: 1,750 acres (7.1 km^{2})
- Elevation: 1,375 ft (419 m)
- Created: 1938
- Established: 1945
- Named for: Tygart Lake on Tygart River
- Governing body: West Virginia Division of Natural Resources
- Website: wvstateparks.com/park/tygart-lake-state-park/

Tygart Lake State Park sits on 391 acres (1.58 km^{2}) along the shores of Tygart Lake in Taylor County near Grafton, West Virginia, United States.

== Facilities ==
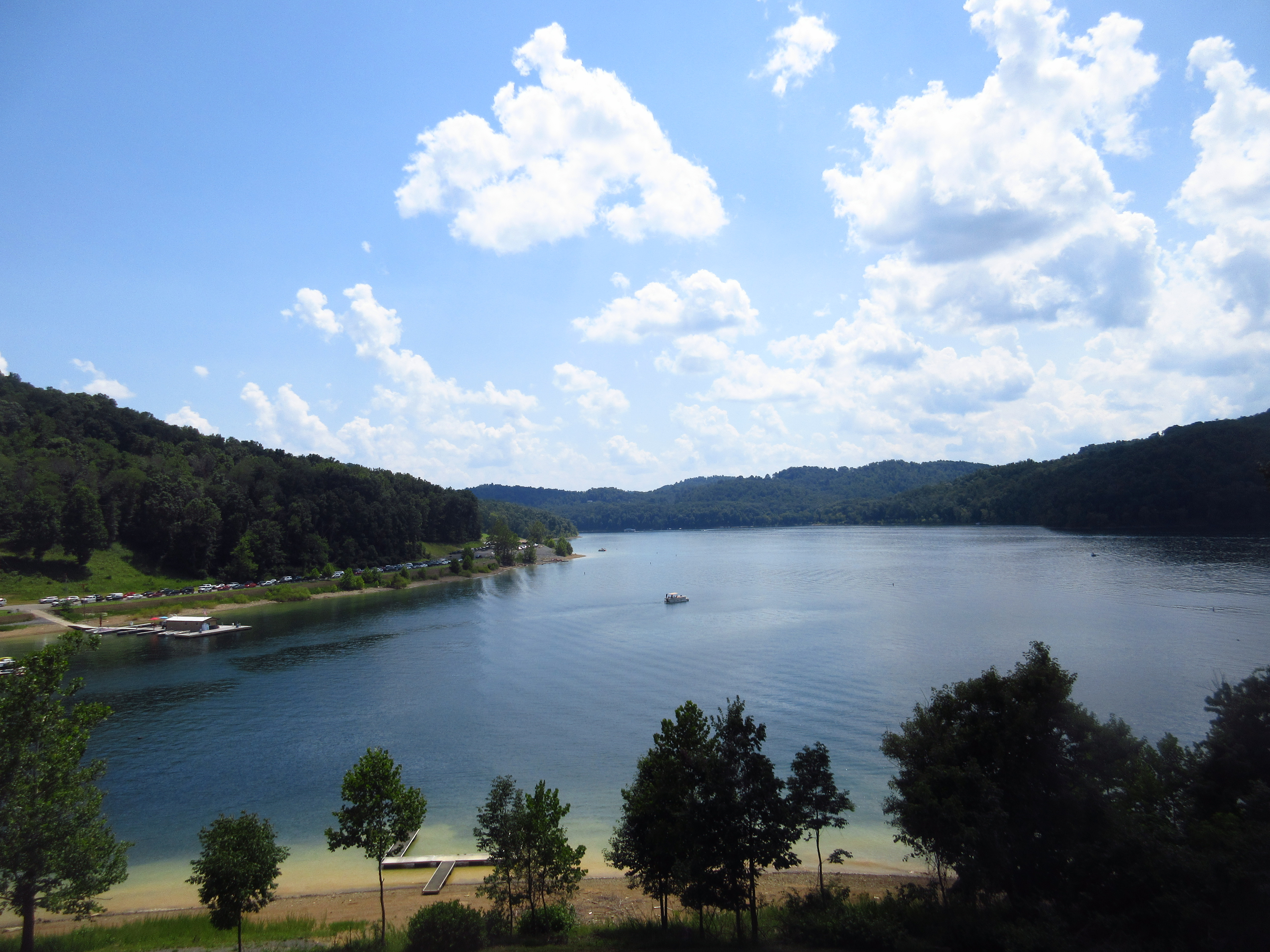
View of the lake from near the lodge.

- 20-room Tygart Lake Lodge
- Lodge restaurant
- 2 gift shops
- 11 cabins
- 40 camp sites (10 with electric hookup)
- Hiking trails
- Boating
- Fishing
- Marina with boat rentals
- Waterskiing
- Swimming
- Picnic area

== See also ==
- List of West Virginia state parks
- State park
