= Knottsville, West Virginia =

Knottsville
- Unincorporated community
- Location within the state of West Virginia Knottsville (the United States)
- Coordinates: 39°18′40″N 79°57′54″W
- Country: United States
- State: West Virginia
- County: Taylor
- Elevation: 1,499 ft (457 m)
- Time zone: UTC-5 (Eastern (EST))
  - Summer (DST): UTC-4 (EDT)
- GNIS ID: 1541281

Knottsville is an unincorporated community in Taylor County, West Virginia, United States.
