= Rosemont, West Virginia =

- Unincorporated community
- Location within West Virginia Location within the United States
- Coordinates: 39°16′07″N 80°09′46″W
- Country: United States
- State: West Virginia
- County: Taylor
- Elevation: 1,004 ft (306 m)
- Time zone: UTC-5 (Eastern (EST))
  - Summer (DST): UTC-4 (EDT)
- ZIP code: 26424
- Area codes: 304 & 681
- GNIS feature ID: 1546081

Rosemont is an unincorporated community in Taylor County, West Virginia, United States. Rosemont is located on West Virginia Route 76, 5 miles (8.0 km) east-southeast of Bridgeport. Rosemont has a post office with ZIP code 26424.
