= Pruntytown, West Virginia =

Pruntytown
- Unincorporated community
- Location within the state of West Virginia Pruntytown (the United States)
- Coordinates: 39°20′2″N 80°4′36″W
- Country: United States
- State: West Virginia
- County: Taylor
- Elevation: 1,204 ft (367 m)
- Time zone: UTC-5 (Eastern (EST))
  - Summer (DST): UTC-4 (EDT)
- GNIS feature ID: 1545306

Pruntytown is an unincorporated community at the junction of the Northwestern Turnpike (U.S. Route 50) and U.S. Route 250 in Taylor County, West Virginia, USA. It was formerly the county seat and is currently the site of the Pruntytown Correctional Center (formerly West Virginia Industrial Home for Boys).

== History ==
The first settlement at Pruntytown — the earliest named white settlement in what is now Taylor County — was made circa 1798 with the arrival of pioneers John Prunty, Sr (1745-1823) and his son David (1768-1841). (Both Pruntys were delegates from Harrison County to the Virginia Assembly who had already lived elsewhere in the region for a quarter century.) The new settlement was initially known as Cross Roads, from the intersection there of the old Clarksburg Pike and the old Beverly and Fairmont Road. On January 1, 1801 Cross Roads was renamed Williamsport in honor of Abraham Williams, a local resident.

The name "Prunty Town" appears in an 1835 gazetteer, which describes the status of the town at the time:

It contains 18 dwelling houses, 1 Methodist and 1 Baptist house of worship, 1 common school, 3 miscellaneous stores, 1 tavern, 1 tanyard, 2 saddlers, 2 boot and shoe factories, 1 hatter, 1 tailor, 2 smith shops, 1 gun smith, and 1 cabinet maker. Population 110. The surrounding country is somewhat broken, but the soil is good, and well adapted to the grazing of cattle; and growing every species of small grain.

That "Baptist house of worship" was the Beulah Baptist Church, organized in 1818. (The current church building went up in 1848.) It was the most influential Baptist congregation in the region, with the largest and wealthiest membership. On May 17, 1839 Elder Joshua Bradley (1773-1855), general agent for the Western Virginia Educational Society (a Baptist association), met with Rev. Enoch Rector (1804-1898), a wealthy Baptist preacher, at Marietta, Ohio. The latter agreed to fund a new college and seminary at Pruntytown in collaboration with the congregation at Beulah. The result was Rector College and Girls’ Seminary, which was established later that year and chartered in 1842. Under the presidency of Bradley, and later that of Rev. Charles A.M. Wheeler (1784-1851), the college flourished for several years with a student body numbering in the hundreds. (Both Bradley and Wheeler were accomplished ministers and intellectuals from New England.) Rector College began to decline after Wheeler’s death and, after a devastating fire in 1855 the institution was dissolved.

The name change to "Pruntytown" was made official on January 23, 1845 to honor the Pruntys. This town served as the Taylor county seat from the county's founding in 1844 until a county election in 1878 moved it approximately three miles away, to Grafton. At this time the main post office also shifted to Grafton and thereafter the community went into a steep decline.

In 1891, the West Virginia Industrial Home for Boys — the state juvenile detention center for male offenders — was established at Pruntytown. According to The West Virginia Encyclopedia (e-WV), "For generations of West Virginia youth, the name Pruntytown was synonymous with reform school". The facility closed in 1983. The Pruntytown Correctional Center (PCC) — a minimum-security state prison for adult offenders of both genders — opened in 1985 on the old grounds.

== Notable person ==
- John Barton Payne (1855–1935), Pruntytown-born lawyer and U.S. Secretary of the Interior (1920–21)
