= Flemington, West Virginia =

- Town
- Location of Flemington in Taylor County, West Virginia.
- Coordinates: 39°16′0″N 80°7′46″W
- Country: United States
- State: West Virginia
- County: Taylor

Area
  - Total: 0.31 sq mi (0.79 km^{2})
  - Land: 0.31 sq mi (0.79 km^{2})
  - Water: 0 sq mi (0.00 km^{2})
- Elevation: 1,020 ft (310 m)

Population (2020)
  - Total: 309
  - Estimate (2021): 307
  - Density: 1,003.6/sq mi (387.49/km^{2})
- Time zone: UTC-5 (Eastern (EST))
  - Summer (DST): UTC-4 (EDT)
- ZIP code: 26347
- Area code: 304
- FIPS code: 54-27940
- GNIS feature ID: 1554472
- Website: https://local.wv.gov/flemington/Pages/default.aspx

Flemington is a town in Taylor County, West Virginia, United States. The population was 311 at the 2020 census.

== History ==
Flemington was incorporated in 1922 by the West Virginia Circuit Court, and named for James Fleming, an early settler in the area originally from Hampshire County. West Virginia College operated here from 1865 to 1895.

== Geography ==
Flemington is located at 39°16′0″N 80°7′46″W (39.266749, -80.129378), along Simpson Creek.

According to the United States Census Bureau, the town has a total area of 0.31 square miles (0.80 km^{2}), all land.

== Demographics ==
Historical population
Census	Pop.	Note	%±
1930	617		—
1940	690		11.8%
1950	572		−17.1%
1960	478		−16.4%
1970	458		−4.2%
1980	452		−1.3%
1990	352		−22.1%
2000	287		−18.5%
2010	312		8.7%
2020	309		−1.0%
2021 (est.)	307	▼	−0.6%
U.S. Decennial Census

=== 2010 census ===
As of the census of 2010, there were 312 people, 124 households, and 90 families living in the town. The population density was 1,006.5 inhabitants per square mile (388.6/km^{2}). There were 139 housing units at an average density of 448.4 per square mile (173.1/km^{2}). The racial makeup of the town was 98.7% White, 0.6% African American, and 0.6% from two or more races. Hispanic or Latino of any race were 2.6% of the population.

There were 124 households, of which 29.0% had children under the age of 18 living with them, 50.0% were married couples living together, 12.1% had a female householder with no husband present, 10.5% had a male householder with no wife present, and 27.4% were non-families. 23.4% of all households were made up of individuals, and 13.7% had someone living alone who was 65 years of age or older. The average household size was 2.52 and the average family size was 2.94.

The median age in the town was 45 years. 21.8% of residents were under the age of 18; 6.1% were between the ages of 18 and 24; 22.1% were from 25 to 44; 29.1% were from 45 to 64; and 20.8% were 65 years of age or older. The gender makeup of the town was 49.4% male and 50.6% female.

=== 2000 census ===
As of the census of 2000, there were 287 people, 108 households, and 77 families living in the town. The population density was 943.5 inhabitants per square mile (369.4/km^{2}). There were 117 housing units at an average density of 384.7 per square mile (150.6/km^{2}). The racial makeup of the town was 98.26% White, 1.05% African American, 0.35% Native American, and 0.35% from two or more races. Hispanic or Latino of any race were 2.44% of the population.

There were 108 households, out of which 29.6% had children under the age of 18 living with them, 58.3% were married couples living together, 8.3% had a female householder with no husband present, and 28.7% were non-families. 24.1% of all households were made up of individuals, and 14.8% had someone living alone who was 65 years of age or older. The average household size was 2.66 and the average family size was 3.19.

In the town, the population was spread out, with 23.7% under the age of 18, 5.9% from 18 to 24, 27.9% from 25 to 44, 27.5% from 45 to 64, and 15.0% who were 65 years of age or older. The median age was 40 years. For every 100 females, there were 108.0 males. For every 100 females age 18 and over, there were 93.8 males.

The median income for a household in the town was $27,917, and the median income for a family was $40,417. Males had a median income of $32,500 versus $21,563 for females. The per capita income for the town was $12,540. About 22.7% of families and 23.6% of the population were below the poverty line, including 24.1% of those under the age of eighteen and 10.5% of those 65 or over.
