= Taylor County, West Virginia =

County in West Virginia, United States

- County
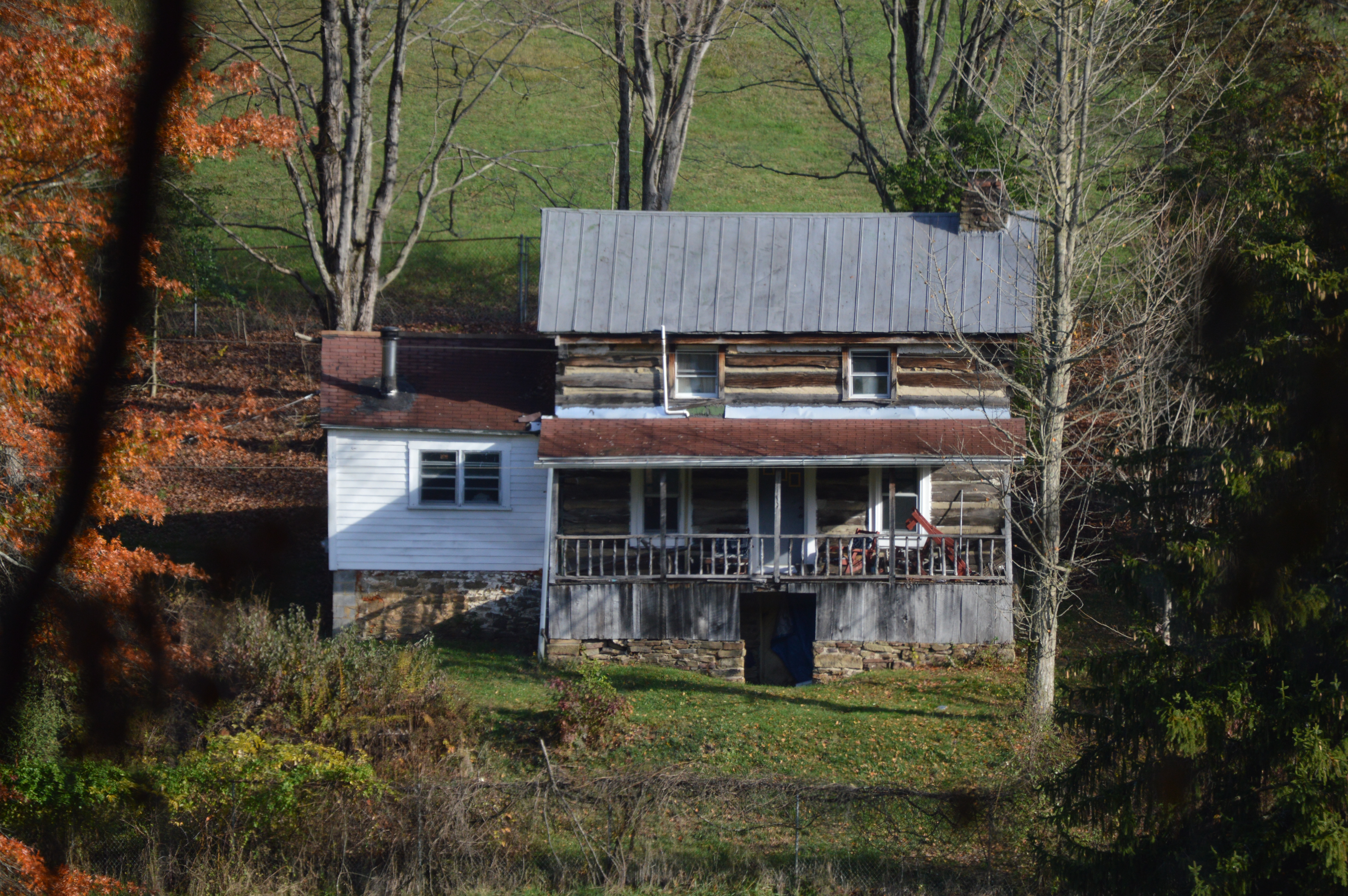
- Clelland House, built in 1800.

- Seal

- Location within the U.S. state of West Virginia
- Coordinates: 39°20′N 80°03′W
- Country: United States
- State: West Virginia
- Founded: January 19, 1844
- Named for: John Taylor of Caroline
- Seat: Grafton
- Largest city: Grafton

Area
  - Total: 176 sq mi (460 km^{2})
  - Land: 173 sq mi (450 km^{2})
  - Water: 2.9 sq mi (7.5 km^{2}) 1.7%

Population (2020)
  - Total: 16,705
  - Estimate (2025): 16,287 ▼
  - Density: 96.6/sq mi (37.3/km^{2})
- Time zone: UTC−5 (Eastern)
  - Summer (DST): UTC−4 (EDT)
- Congressional district: 1st
- Website: www.wvcountytaylor.com

Taylor County is a county in the U.S. state of West Virginia. As of the 2020 census, the population was 16,705. Its county seat is Grafton. The county was formed in 1844 and named for Senator John Taylor of Caroline. Taylor County is part of the Clarksburg, WV Micropolitan Statistical Area.

== History ==
This area was populated by the Adena culture in the Pre-Columbian Woodland period of the Native Americans in the United States.

In 1768, trapper John Simpson became the earliest known person of European descent to enter present-day Taylor County.

Pruntytown is the oldest (c. 1798) known white settlement in what is now Taylor County. Initially known as Cross Roads, on January 1, 1801, it was renamed Williamsport in honor of Abraham Williams, a longtime resident. The name was changed again on January 23, 1845, to honor pioneer settler John Prunty, Sr (1745-1823) and son David. This town served as the county seat of government from the county's founding in 1844 until a county election in 1878 moved that honor to Grafton, West Virginia.

The county was established by the Virginia General Assembly on January 19, 1844. It was formed out of parts of Barbour, Harrison, and Marion counties in Virginia. Most historians think the county was named after John Taylor (1753-1824) of Caroline County, Virginia, while a minority believe it was named after Zachary Taylor. Fifteen justices were appointed by Governor James McDowell to organize the newly formed county: John Asbury, Frederick Burdett, Dr. Joseph L. Carr, John Cather, John A. Guseman, Nathan Hall, Calder Haymond, Absalom Knotts, John Leeper, Charles W. Newlon, Jonathan Poe, Robert Reed, Joshua A. Robinson, William A. Rogers, and Benjamin Sinclair.

On June 20, 1863, at the height of the Civil War, Taylor was one of fifty Virginia counties that were admitted to the Union as the state of West Virginia. Later that year, the counties were divided into civil townships, with the intention of encouraging local government. This proved impractical in the heavily rural state, and in 1872 the townships were converted into magisterial districts. Taylor County was initially divided into nine townships: Booths Creek, (Note: Spelled "Booth's Creek" before 1890.) Clay, Court House, Fetterman, Flemington, Grafton, Haymond, Union, and Webster. Grafton Township was co-extensive with the town of Grafton.

In 1871, Union Township was annexed by Grafton Township; the following year, Clay and Webster Townships were annexed by Court House Township, Haymond was annexed by Fetterman, and the five remaining townships were converted to magisterial districts. In the 1880s, Knottsville District was created from the part of Grafton District that lay outside the town of Grafton. Except for minor adjustments, the six historic districts remained largely unchanged for the next ninety years, until in the 1970s they were consolidated into three new magisterial districts: Central, Eastern, and Western. In the 1990s, Central District was renamed, becoming Tygart.

The West Virginia Equal Suffrage Association was founded in November 1895 at the Taylor County Courthouse after a meeting called by leaders of the National American Woman Suffrage Association.

Anna Jarvis, the founder of the Mother's Day, was a native of Taylor County, which is now home to the International Mother's Day Shrine.

== Geography ==
According to the United States Census Bureau, the county has a total area of 176 square miles (460 km^{2}), of which 173 square miles (450 km^{2}) is land and 2.9 square miles (7.5 km^{2}) (1.7%) is water. It is the fifth-smallest county in West Virginia by area.

=== Major highways ===
- U.S. 50
- U.S. 119
- U.S. 250
- WV 76
- WV 310

=== Adjacent counties ===
- Monongalia County (north)
- Preston County (east)
- Barbour County (south)
- Harrison County (west)
- Marion County (northwest)

== Demographics ==
Historical population
Census	Pop.	Note	%±
1850	5,367		—
1860	7,463		39.1%
1870	9,367		25.5%
1880	11,455		22.3%
1890	12,147		6.0%
1900	14,978		23.3%
1910	16,554		10.5%
1920	18,742		13.2%
1930	19,114		2.0%
1940	19,919		4.2%
1950	18,422		−7.5%
1960	15,010		−18.5%
1970	13,878		−7.5%
1980	16,584		19.5%
1990	15,144		−8.7%
2000	16,089		6.2%
2010	16,895		5.0%
2020	16,705		−1.1%
2025 (est.)	16,287	▼	−2.5%
U.S. Decennial Census; 1790–1960 1900–1990; 1990–2000 2010–2020

=== 2020 census ===
As of the 2020 census, the county had a population of 16,705. Of the residents, 20.6% were under the age of 18 and 20.3% were 65 years of age or older; the median age was 43.8 years. For every 100 females there were 102.2 males, and for every 100 females age 18 and over there were 100.1 males.

The racial makeup of the county was 94.0% White, 0.7% Black or African American, 0.1% American Indian and Alaska Native, 0.2% Asian, 0.2% from some other race, and 4.7% from two or more races. Hispanic or Latino residents of any race comprised 1.1% of the population.

There were 6,723 households in the county, of which 28.1% had children under the age of 18 living with them and 23.5% had a female householder with no spouse or partner present. About 26.9% of all households were made up of individuals and 13.0% had someone living alone who was 65 years of age or older.

There were 7,441 housing units in the county, of which 9.6% were vacant. Among occupied housing units, 78.4% were owner-occupied and 21.6% were renter-occupied. The homeowner vacancy rate was 1.5% and the rental vacancy rate was 7.1%.

The average household and family size was 3.08. The median income for a household was $52,823 and the poverty rate was 16.2%.

Taylor County, West Virginia – Racial and ethnic composition Note: the US Census treats Hispanic/Latino as an ethnic category. This table excludes Latinos from the racial categories and assigns them to a separate category. Hispanics/Latinos may be of any race.
Race / Ethnicity (NH = Non-Hispanic)	Pop 2000	Pop 2010	Pop 2020	% 2000	% 2010	% 2020
White alone (NH)	15,712	16,377	15,636	97.66%	96.93%	93.60%
Black or African American alone (NH)	131	125	112	0.81%	0.74%	0.67%
Native American or Alaska Native alone (NH)	31	37	19	0.19%	0.22%	0.11%
Asian alone (NH)	24	60	41	0.15%	0.36%	0.25%
Pacific Islander alone (NH)	0	0	0	0.00%	0.00%	0.00%
Other race alone (NH)	4	3	22	0.02%	0.02%	0.13%
Mixed race or Multiracial (NH)	92	150	696	0.57%	0.89%	4.17%
Hispanic or Latino (any race)	95	143	179	0.59%	0.85%	1.07%
Total	16,089	16,895	16,705	100.00%	100.00%	100.00%

=== 2010 census ===
As of the 2010 United States census, there were 16,895 people, 6,778 households, and 4,703 families living in the county. The population density was 97.8 inhabitants per square mile (37.8/km^{2}). There were 7,541 housing units at an average density of 43.6 units per square mile (16.8 units/km^{2}). The racial makeup of the county was 97.5% white, 0.7% black or African American, 0.4% Asian, 0.2% American Indian, 0.1% from other races, and 1.0% from two or more races. Those of Hispanic or Latino origin made up 0.8% of the population. In terms of ancestry, 26.1% were German, 22.9% were Irish, 11.3% were American, 10.3% were English, 7.2% were Italian, and 5.1% were Dutch.

Of the 6,778 households, 29.3% had children under the age of 18 living with them, 53.6% were married couples living together, 10.6% had a female householder with no husband present, 30.6% were non-families, and 26.1% of all households were made up of individuals. The average household size was 2.42 and the average family size was 2.89. The median age was 42.3 years.

The median income for a household in the county was $36,956 and the median income for a family was $45,620. Males had a median income of $38,085 versus $26,292 for females. The per capita income for the county was $18,562. About 11.3% of families and 15.8% of the population were below the poverty line, including 21.6% of those under age 18 and 16.0% of those age 65 or over.

=== 2000 census ===
As of the census of 2000, there were 16,089 people, 6,320 households, and 4,487 families living in the county. The population density was 93 people per square mile (36 people/km^{2}). There were 7,125 housing units at an average density of 41 units per square mile (16 units/km^{2}). The racial makeup of the county was 98.07% White, 0.83% Black or African American, 0.19% Native American, 0.17% Asian, 0.04% Pacific Islander, 0.06% from other races, and 0.63% from two or more races. 0.59% of the population were Hispanic or Latino of any race.

There were 6,320 households, out of which 30.90% had children under the age of 18 living with them, 56.40% were married couples living together, 10.90% had a female householder with no husband present, and 29.00% were non-families. 25.50% of all households were made up of individuals, and 12.60% had someone living alone who was 65 years of age or older. The average household size was 2.47 and the average family size was 2.95.

In the county, the population was spread out, with 22.90% under the age of 18, 7.90% from 18 to 24, 28.50% from 25 to 44, 24.90% from 45 to 64, and 15.80% who were 65 years of age or older. The median age was 39 years. For every 100 females, there were 95.70 males. For every 100 females age 18 and over, there were 92.90 males.

The median income for a household in the county was $27,124, and the median income for a family was $32,222. Males had a median income of $29,349 versus $20,116 for females. The per capita income for the county was $13,681. About 15.30% of families and 20.30% of the population were below the poverty line, including 27.00% of those under age 18 and 16.10% of those age 65 or over.

== Politics ==
United States presidential election results for Taylor County, West Virginia
Year	Republican		Democratic		Third party(ies)	
Year	No.	%	No.	%	No.	%
1912	791	21.22%	1,445	38.77%	1,491	40.01%
1916	2,002	53.23%	1,672	44.46%	87	2.31%
1920	3,649	60.02%	2,311	38.01%	120	1.97%
1924	3,683	53.45%	2,499	36.27%	708	10.28%
1928	5,101	66.20%	2,548	33.07%	56	0.73%
1932	3,856	46.54%	4,293	51.82%	136	1.64%
1936	4,061	41.03%	5,795	58.55%	42	0.42%
1940	4,841	49.35%	4,968	50.65%	0	0.00%
1944	3,890	51.57%	3,653	48.43%	0	0.00%
1948	3,948	50.16%	3,888	49.40%	35	0.44%
1952	4,711	55.67%	3,752	44.33%	0	0.00%
1956	4,743	60.64%	3,079	39.36%	0	0.00%
1960	3,992	53.36%	3,489	46.64%	0	0.00%
1964	2,292	34.04%	4,442	65.96%	0	0.00%
1968	3,012	46.84%	2,953	45.92%	466	7.25%
1972	4,385	67.77%	2,085	32.23%	0	0.00%
1976	2,891	42.54%	3,905	57.46%	0	0.00%
1980	3,010	46.40%	3,216	49.58%	261	4.02%
1984	4,007	59.23%	2,754	40.71%	4	0.06%
1988	2,816	49.46%	2,852	50.09%	26	0.46%
1992	2,022	33.07%	2,843	46.49%	1,250	20.44%
1996	1,977	35.73%	2,692	48.65%	864	15.62%
2000	3,124	54.69%	2,473	43.29%	115	2.01%
2004	3,893	59.43%	2,617	39.95%	41	0.63%
2008	3,605	58.12%	2,462	39.69%	136	2.19%
2012	3,840	64.85%	1,941	32.78%	140	2.36%
2016	4,733	71.79%	1,491	22.61%	369	5.60%
2020	5,477	74.18%	1,796	24.33%	110	1.49%
2024	5,422	74.63%	1,694	23.32%	149	2.05%

Taylor County, competitive throughout the 20th century, has been solidly Republican in presidential elections since 2000.

== Communities ==
=== City ===
- Grafton (county seat)

=== Town ===
- Flemington

=== Magisterial districts ===
==== Current ====
- Eastern
- Tygart
- Western

==== Historic ====
- Booths Creek
- Court House
- Fetterman
- Flemington
- Grafton
- Knottsville

=== Unincorporated communities ===
- Astor
- Belgium
- Blueville
- Brownlow
- Elliotsville
- Fetterman
- Hardman (partial)
- Hepzibah
- Knottsville
- Lucretia
- McGee
- Meadland
- Millertown
- Oreide
- Park View
- Pruntytown
- Rosemont
- Sandy
- Santiago
- Simpson
- South Grafton
- Tappan
- Thornton
- Webster
- Wendel
- West Grafton
- Westerman

== Education ==
The only school district in the county is Taylor County School District.

== See also ==
- National Register of Historic Places listings in Taylor County, West Virginia
- Pruntytown Wildlife Management Area
- Tygart Lake State Park
- Valley Falls State Park
