= Why Mom Deserves a Diamond contest =

American essay contest

The "Why Mom Deserves a Diamond" contest is an American essay contest founded by Michael "Diamond Mike" Watson in Costa Mesa, California in 1993. The contest was established in honor of Watson's adoptive mother and the birth mother he had never known. In a limited number of words, children are asked to write essays explaining why their mother deserves a diamond.

Hundreds of thousands of American children have participated, and dozens of children have won the grand prize of a diamond to give to their mothers (and other precious gems). The first winner was sophomore Margaret Ketchersid, from Edison High School in Huntington Beach, California. On Mother's Day 1993, she was awarded the grand prize of a quarter-carat diamond to give to her mother, Ruth.

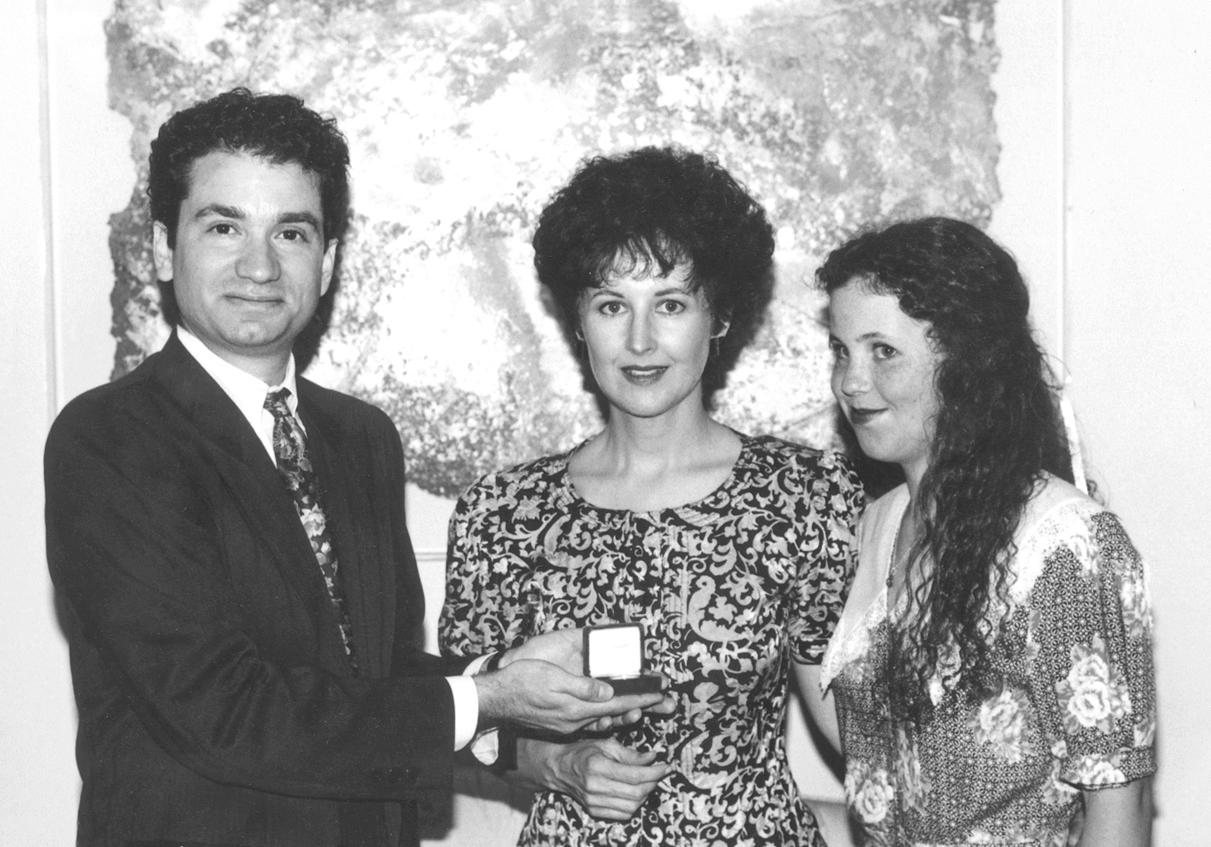
Founder Diamond Mike Watson presents the unmounted diamond to the first diamond winner, Margaret Ketchersid, to give to her mother, Ruth. (Mother’s Day, 1991.)

== Founder ==
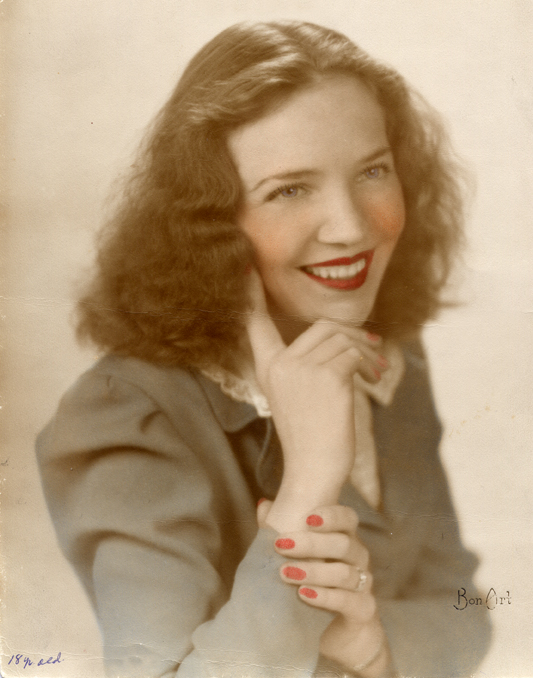
Martha Velia Watson March 15, 1920 – September 14, 2006

Michael "Diamond Mike" Watson was born and adopted in Indianapolis in 1958. He spent his early life in New Albany, where his adopted parents raised him. The foundation of the contest began while Watson was searching for his own birth mother when he was 17.

About the same time he started his quest, Watson entered the jewelry industry as an errand boy for a store in New Albany. He joined a retail chain and worked in jewelry stores in Indiana, Kentucky and Kansas City, then moved to California in 1989. In 1991, Watson opened Gallery of Diamonds Jewelers in Costa Mesa, California.

Watson obtained a copy of his hospital bill from Community Hospital, which showed his mother's name (Betty Price) and age. Armed with this information, he embarked on a search that lasted nearly 20 years. Watson found the judge who had presided over the adoption only to learn that the records were sealed. The judge did, however, give Watson the report by the Department of Public Welfare, which contained information about his birth mother. The report listed names and a wedding date, and he contacted every county in Indiana to locate a wedding license. In mid-1994 he heard from the courthouse in Coatesville that the information on the license matched. He found that his birth mother's maiden name was Stewart, and also discovered her parents' address and telephone number. When calling his biological grandmother, she said that no one knew he was alive because his birth mother told the family he was stillborn. He learned that his mother had died in 1981.

Watson then learned he had an infant sister that vanished before he was born. Thus began a new journey to find his missing sibling. With the help of five genealogical researchers in which Watson named the Fabulous Five, Watson finally found his missing sister alive and well in 2017. That same year, with the miracle of DNA matching, Watson discovered his paternal Syrian Jewish roots and that he came from a long ancestry of distinguished rabbis from Aleppo, Syria. His great great grandfather was Hakham Mordechai Abadi.

From 1993 to 2012, Watson published the winning entries in an annual book to raise money for the local county's library. Over the years, thousands of children submit their essays to the company's headquarters in Santa Ana, California, and come to Gallery of Diamonds Jewelers every year.

Watson earned a Bachelor of Science in Business Administration from Indiana University Southeast and is a gemologist from the Gemological Institute of America. He is the author of Moon Over Mountains- The Search for Mom, The Legend of Why Mom Deserves a Diamond, Tales of Imagination- Everything is Real, In Search of Mom- Journey of an Adoptee, and Adopted Like Me- Chosen to Search for a Birthmother.

== Diamond Winners ==
Year	Winner	Grade	School	City	State
1993	Margaret Ketchersid	10	Edison HS	Huntington Beach	CA
1994	Alison Murphy	10	Capistrano Valley HS	Mission Viejo	CA
1995	Scott Kircher	6	Harbor Day	Corona del Mar	CA
1996	Megan Darakjian	4	Cordillera	Mission Viejo	CA
1996	Lauren Kiang	7	La Paz Intermediate	Mission Viejo	CA
1997	Jessica Barraco	4	Eastshore Elementary	Irvine	CA
1997	Genevieve Slunka	11	Irvine High	Irvine	CA
1998	Jason Kirstein	3	Westwood Basics	Irvine	CA
1998	Tawnya Ravy	7	Bernardo M.S.	Yorba Linda	CA
1998	Vicki Ann Blood	4	St. Pancratius	Lakewood	CA
1998	Jennifer Plankenhorn	8	Arroyo Seco	Valencia	CA
1999	Blair Perkins	5	Taft Elementary	Orange	CA
1999	Paula Kim	7	Los Alisos	Mission Viejo	CA
1999	Roberto Ruiz	5	St. Malachy	Los Angeles	CA
1999	Chris Olsen-Philips	6	Binford Elementary	Bloomington	IN
1999	Brice Tomlinson	6	Trinity Christian Academy	Addison	TX
2000	Sandy Enriquez	5	Gilbert Elem.	Garden Grove	CA
2000	Tiffany Lamanski	7	St. Pius V	Buena Park	CA
2000	Rachel Tomberlin	7	St. Timothy Episcopal	Apple Valley	CA
2000	Victor Taylor	5	St. Mary	New Albany	IN
2000	Ashley Goodell	8	Chippewa M.S.	Okemos	MI
2000	Laura Cataldi	10	Nardin Academy	Buffalo	NY
2000	Ashley Kreidler	11	St. Johns	Delphos	OH
2000	Jennifer Scruggs	5	Sleepy Hollow Elementary	Amarillo	TX
2001	E. J. Debowski	4	John Malcolm	Laguna Niguel	CA
2001	Alyssa Connella	7	La Paz	Mission Viejo	CA
2001	Jesus Hernandez, Jr.	12	St. Thomas High	Houston	TX
2002	Harry Hudson	2	Bathgate Elem.	Mission Viejo	CA
2002	Amanda Wheeler	7	Los Alisos	Mission Viejo	CA
2002	Matthew W. Scott	11	Heartland High	Belton	MO
2003	Aris Simsarian	2	De Portola Elem.	Mission Viejo	CA
2003	Logan Cluttey	8	Los Flores M.S.	R. Sta. Margarita	CA
2003	Travis Dziad	6	St. Mary's	Greenville	SC
2004	Tyler Buttle	5	Reilly Elementary	Mission Viejo	CA
2004	Erica Haggerty	8	St. Angela Merici	Brea	CA
2004	Lindsey Croft	12	Nevada Union High	Grass Valley	CA
2005	Analyse Groton	4	Linda Vista Elem.	Orange	CA
2005	Jason Punzalon	8	Servite High	Anaheim	CA
2005	Emily Magers	6	Timberview M.S.	Colorado Springs	CO
2006	Kevin Banifatemi	5	De Portola Elem.	Mission Viejo	CA
2006	Laura Chae	7	Sierra Vista M.S.	Irvine	CA
2006	Sera Choi	7	Becker M.S.	Las Vegas	NV
2007	Grace Penner	5	Brookhaven Ele.	Placentia	CA
2007	Michael Glidden	11	Capistrano Valley HS	Mission Viejo	CA
2008	Sophia Vazquez	2	Jim Thorpe Fund.	Santa Ana	CA
2008	Linda Huynh	7	Fred Moila	Fountain Valley	CA
2009	David Duplissey	4	Ambuehl Ele.	San Juan Capistr.	CA
2009	Cheryl Bond	7	Oak Middle School	Los Alamitos	CA
2010	Harvey Zhou	4	Canyon View Elem.	Irvine	CA
2010	Thomas Loi	8	Bethel Baptist	Santa Ana	CA
2011	Leah Korenberg	1	Los Coyotes	La Palma	CA
2011	Charlie Xu	8	Rancho San Joaquin	Irvine	CA
2012	Makenzie Kaufman	4	Vista Verde	Irvine	CA
2012	Lauren Lee	8	Fairmont Private	Santa Ana	CA
2013	Gage Butterfield	6	Crescent Intermediate	Anaheim	CA
2013	Tony Scarsciotti	4	Benson Elementary	Tustin	CA
2014	Nikki Young	7	MacArthur Fundamental	Santa Ana	CA
2014	Sarah Stern	11	University High	Santa Ana	CA
2014	Benjamin Pham	3	Roch Courreges Elementary	Fountain Valley	CA
2015	Gavin Mosher	7	California Virtual Academy	Trabuco Canyon	CA
2015	Neha Abbas	5	John O. Tynes	Placentia	CA
2016	Danali Olivares	7	Mendez Fundamental	Santa Ana	CA
2016	Gina Kim	5	Margaret Landell Elementary	Cypress	CA
2017	Joseph Hamby	6	Emery Elementary	Buena Park	CA
2017	Lauren Morgan	3	Gilbert Elementary	Garden Grove	CA
2018	Katelyn Oho	4	Robert Fisler Elementary	Fullerton	CA
2018	Leah Korenberg	4	Christ Lutheran School	Costa Mesa	CA
2019	Mai Han Tran	5	Eastwood Elementary	Westminister	CA
2019	Allison Kim	6	Margaret Landell Elementary	Cypress	CA
2020	Genevieve Raphael	5	Vista Verde School	Irvine	CA
2020	Brayden Nguyen	8	Bethany Christian Academy	Westminster	CA
2021	Giselle Nguyen	2	Northcutt Elementary	Fountain Valley	CA
2021	Dylan Tran	6	Eastwood Elementary	Westminster	CA
2022	Jason Ross	6	St. John’s Episcopal	Rancho Santa Margarita	CA
2023	Claire Cho	6	Landell Elementary	Cypress	CA
2024	Zennia Achouri	5	Westpark School	Irvine	CA
2025	Braelyn Murphy	7	Sowers Middle School	Huntington Beach	CA
2025	Lauren O’Hara	9	Irvine High School (1995)	Irvine	CA
2026	Devin Delgado	5	Maple Elementary	Fullerton	CA

== Intellectual property ==
The trademark Why Mom Deserves a Diamond was filed with the United States Patent and Trademark office on July 27, 2001, registration number 2,620,840. The trademark, The Legendary Contest, received registration on April 17, 2007, as "A writing contest in which kids can honor their mothers and have the chance to win a diamond or gemstone." Reg #3229618.

== Anthologies ==
From 1993 to 2012, Gallery of Diamonds Jewelers, the founding sponsor of the contest, published an annual anthology of the winners. A portion of the proceeds from the sale of these books were donated to the Orange County Library system in Orange County, California. Following are the book titles and the years they were published.

- 2012. Why Mom Deserves a Diamond - A Gift of Love
- 2011. Why Mom Deserves a Diamond - Legacy Edition
- 2010. Why Mom Deserves a Diamond - Discovered With Great Bliss
- 2009. Why Mom Deserves a Diamond - The Encouraging Branch
- 2008. Why Mom Deserves a Diamond - The Crystal Heart
- 2007. Why Mom Deserves a Diamond - Sparkling Treasures
- 2006. Why Mom Deserves a Diamond - Beyond the Goddess Venus
- 2005. Why Mom Deserves a Diamond - Words of Love
- 2004. Why Mom Deserves a Diamond - Twelve Years of Love
- 2003. Why Mom Deserves a Diamond - The Legendary Contest
- 2002. Why Mom Deserves a Diamond - 10th Anniversary of the Greatest Contest on Earth
- 2001. Why Mom Deserves a Diamond - The Greatest Contest on Earth
- 2000. Why Mom Deserves a Diamond - A Millennium Mother's Day Tribute
- 1999. Why Mom Deserves a Diamond - Seventh Anniversary Edition
- 1998. Why Mom Deserves a Diamond - 1,500 Essay Winners for 1998
- 1997. Why Mom Deserves a Diamond - 1,002 Essay Winners for 1997
- 1996. Why Mom Deserves a Diamond - 732 Essay Winners for 1996
- 1995. Why Mom Deserves a Diamond - 391 Essay Winners for 1995
- 1994. Why Mom Deserves a Diamond - 1994 Essay Winners
- 1993. Why Mom Deserves a Diamond - 1993 Essay Winners
