= Mother's Day Proclamation =

1870 essay by Julia Ward Howe

Mothers' Day Proclamation
- Created: 1870
- Author: Julia Ward Howe
- Subject: Feminism, politics, gender
- Purpose: Appeal for women to unite

The "Appeal to womanhood throughout the world" (later known as "Mothers' Day Proclamation") by Julia Ward Howe was an appeal for women to unite for peace in the world. Written in 1870, Howe's "Appeal to womanhood" was a pacifist reaction to the carnage of the American Civil War and the Franco-Prussian War. The appeal was tied to Howe's feminist conviction that women had a responsibility to shape their societies at the political level.

The original Mothers' Day Proclamation, Julia Ward Howe, 1870:

Arise, then... women of this day!

Arise, all women who have hearts, whether our baptism be that of water or of tears! Say firmly: We will not have great questions decided by irrelevant agencies. Our husbands shall not come to us, reeking with carnage, for caresses and applause. Our sons shall not be taken from us to unlearn all that we have been able to teach them of charity, mercy and patience. We, women of one country, will be too tender of those of another country to allow our sons to be trained to injure theirs.

From the bosom of the devastated earth a voice goes up with our own. It says: Disarm, Disarm! The sword of murder is not the balance of justice. Blood does not wipe out dishonor, nor violence vindicate possession. As men have often forsaken the plough and the anvil at the summons of war, let women now leave all that may be left of home for a great and earnest day of council.

Let them meet first, as women, to bewail and commemorate the dead. Let them then solemnly take council with each other as to the means whereby the great human family can live in peace, each bearing after his own kind the sacred impress, not of Caesar, but of God.

In the name of womanhood and of humanity, I earnestly ask that a general congress of women, without limit of nationality, may be appointed and held at some place deemed most convenient, and at the earliest period consistent with its objects,

to promote the alliance of the different nationalities, the amicable settlement of international questions, the great and general interests of peace.

In 1872 Howe asked for the celebration of a "Mothers' Day for Peace" on 2 June of every year, but she was unsuccessful. The modern Mother's Day was established by Anna Jarvis 36 years later. While the day she established was different in significance from what Howe had proposed, Anna Jarvis was reportedly inspired by her mother's work with Howe.

Today, an edited version of the appeal is included in the Unitarian Universalist hymnal Singing the Living Tradition.

== Appeal to womanhood throughout the world ==
Again, in the sight of the Christian world, have the skill and power of two great nations exhausted themselves in mutual murder. Again have the sacred questions of international justice been committed to the fatal mediation of military weapons. In this day of progress, in this century of light, the ambition of rulers has been allowed to barter the dear interests of domestic life for the bloody exchanges of the battle field. Thus men have done. Thus men will do. But women need no longer be made a party to proceedings which fill the globe with grief and horror. Despite the assumptions of physical force, the mother has a sacred and commanding word to say to the sons who owe their life to her suffering. That word should now be heard, and answered to as never before.

Arise, then, Christian women of this day ! Arise, all women who have hearts, Whether your baptism be that of water or of tears ! Say firmly : We will not have great questions decided by irrelevant agencies. Our husbands shall not come to us, reeking with carnage, for caresses and applause. Our sons shall not be taken from us to unlearn all that we have been able to teach them of charity, mercy and patience. We, women of one country, will be too tender of those of another country, to allow our sons to be trained to injure theirs. From the bosom of the devastated earth a voice goes up with our own. It says: Disarm, disarm! The sword of murder is not the balance of justice. Blood does not wipe out dishonor, nor violence vindicate possession. As men have often forsaken the plough and the anvil at the summons of war, let women now leave all that may be left of home for a great and earnest day of council.

Let them meet first, as women, to bewail and commemorate the dead. Let them then solemnly take council with each other as to the means whereby the great human family can live in peace, man as the brother of man, each bearing after his own kind the sacred impress, not of Caesar, but of God.

In the name of womanhood and of humanity, I earnestly ask that a general congress of women, without limit of nationality, may be appointed and held at some place deemed most convenient, and at the earliest period consistent with its objects, to promote the alliance of the different nationalities, the amicable settlement of international questions, the great and general interests of peace.

— Julia Ward Howe
