= Mother's Day =

Celebration honouring mothers

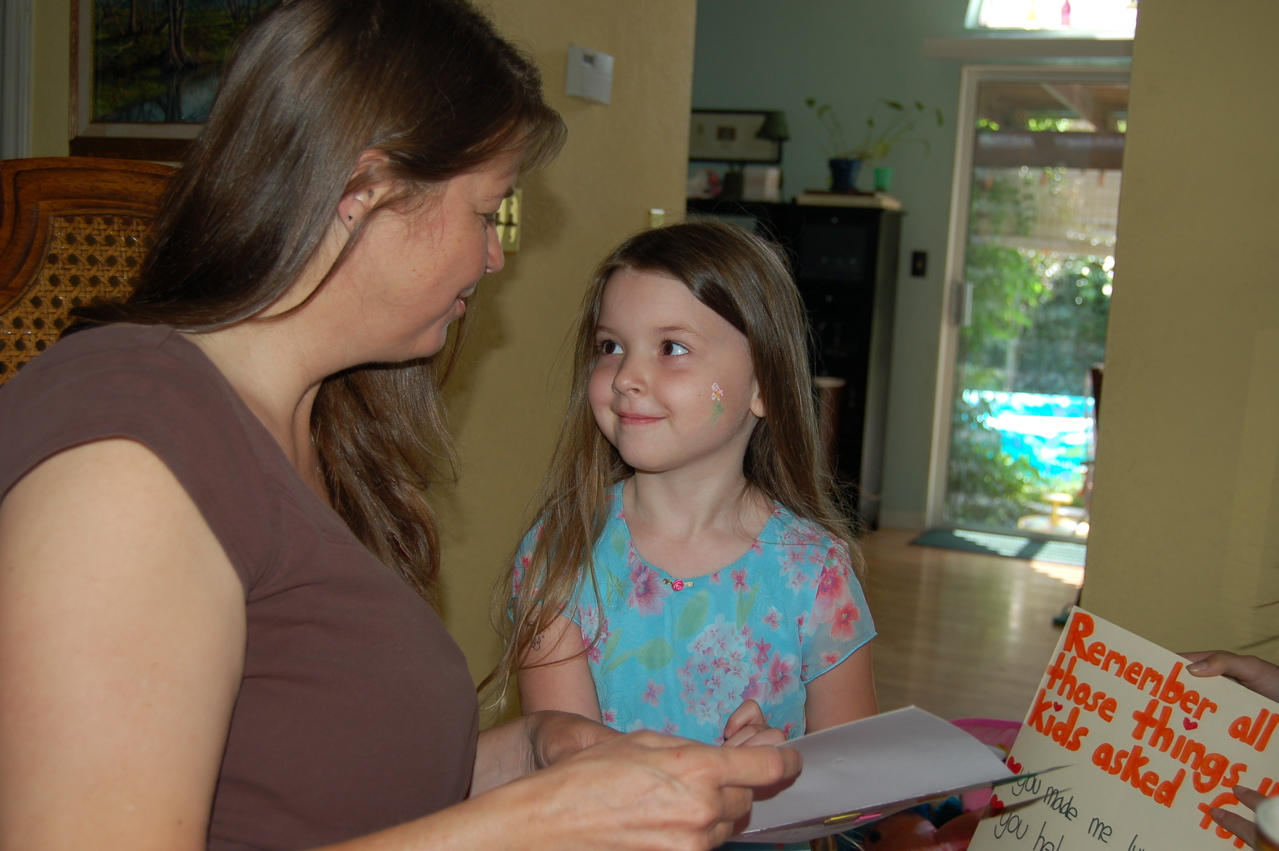
- Mother and daughter with Mother's Day card
- Observed by: 40+ countries
- Type: Worldwide
- Significance: Honors mothers and motherhood
- Date: Varies per country
- Frequency: Annual
- Related to: Children's Day; Siblings Day; Father's Day; Parents' Day; Grandparents' Day

Mother's Day is a celebration honoring the mother of the family or individual, as well as motherhood, maternal bonds, and the influence of mothers in society. It is celebrated on different days in many parts of the world, most commonly in March or May. It complements similar celebrations honoring family members, such as Father's Day, Siblings Day, and Grandparents' Day.

Countries around the world have a multi-century history of a day to celebrate mothers.

In the United States, the modern version of the holiday began in the early 20th century at the initiative of Anna Jarvis. She organized the first Mother's Day service of worship and celebration at Andrews Methodist Episcopal Church in Grafton, West Virginia, which serves as the International Mother's Day Shrine today. It is not directly related to the many traditional celebrations of mothers and motherhood that have existed throughout the world over thousands of years, such as the Greek worshippers of Cybele, the mother deity Rhea, the Roman festival of Hilaria, or the other Christian ecclesiastical Mothering Sunday celebration (associated with the image of Mother Church). However, in some countries, Mother's Day is still synonymous with these older traditions.

The American version of Mother's Day has been criticized for having become too commercialized. Jarvis herself, who began the celebration as a liturgical observance, regretted this commercialism and expressed that this was never her intention. In response, Constance Adelaide Smith successfully advocated for Mothering Sunday as a commemoration of a broader definition of motherhood in many other parts of the English-speaking world.

== Establishment of holiday ==
Andrews Methodist Episcopal Church, the site of the first Mother's Day religious service in 1908, is the International Mother's Day Shrine.

The modern holiday was first celebrated in 1908, when Anna Jarvis held the first Mother's Day service of worship at Andrews Methodist Episcopal Church in Grafton, West Virginia. Andrew's Methodist Church now holds the International Mother's Day Shrine. Her campaign to make Mother's Day a recognized holiday in the United States began in 1905, the year her mother, Ann Reeves Jarvis, died. Ann Jarvis had been a peace activist who cared for wounded soldiers on both sides of the American Civil War, and created Mother's Day Work Clubs to address public health issues. She and another peace activist and suffragist, Julia Ward Howe, had been urging for the creation of a "Mother's Day For Peace" where mothers would ask that their husbands and sons were no longer killed in wars. Forty years before it became an official holiday, Ward Howe had made her Mother's Day Proclamation in 1870, which called upon mothers of all nationalities to band together to promote the "amicable settlement of international questions, the great and general interests of peace." Anna Jarvis wanted to honor this and to set aside a day to honor all mothers because she believed a mother is "the person who has done more for you than anyone in the world".

In 1908, the U.S. Congress rejected a proposal to make Mother's Day an official holiday, joking that they would also have to proclaim a "Mother-in-law's Day". However, owing to the efforts of Anna Jarvis, by 1911 all U.S. states observed the holiday, with some of them officially recognizing Mother's Day as a local holiday (the first being West Virginia, Jarvis's home state, in 1910). In 1914, Woodrow Wilson signed a proclamation designating Mother's Day, held on the second Sunday in May, as a national holiday to honor mothers.

Although Jarvis, who started Mother's Day as a liturgical service, was successful in founding the celebration, she became resentful of the commercialization of the holiday, and it became associated with the phrase "Hallmark holiday". By the early 1920s, Hallmark Cards and other companies had started selling Mother's Day cards. Jarvis believed that the companies had misinterpreted and exploited the idea of Mother's Day, and that the emphasis of the holiday was on sentiment, not profit. As a result, she organized boycotts of Mother's Day and threatened to issue lawsuits against the companies involved. Jarvis argued that people should appreciate and honor their mothers through handwritten letters expressing their love and gratitude, instead of buying gifts and pre-made cards. Jarvis protested at a candy makers' convention in Philadelphia in 1923, and at a meeting of American War Mothers in 1925. By this time, carnations had become associated with Mother's Day, and the selling of carnations by the American War Mothers to raise money angered Jarvis, who was arrested for disturbing the peace.

In Britain, Constance Adelaide Smith was inspired to advocate for Mothering Sunday, an already-existing Christian ecclesiastical celebration in which the faithful visit the church in which they received the sacrament of baptism, as an equivalent celebration. She referred to medieval traditions of celebrating Mother Church, 'mothers of earthly homes', Mary, mother of Jesus, and Mother Nature. Her efforts were successful in the British Isles and other parts of the English-speaking world.

== Spelling ==
In 1912, Anna Jarvis trademarked the phrase "Second Sunday in May, Mother's Day, Anna Jarvis, Founder", and created the Mother's Day International Association. She specifically noted that "Mother's" should "be a singular possessive, for each family to honor its own mother, not a plural possessive commemorating all mothers in the world." This is also the spelling used by U.S. President Woodrow Wilson in his 1914 presidential proclamation, by the U.S. Congress in relevant bills, and by various U.S. presidents in their proclamations concerning Mother's Day.

== Dates around the world ==
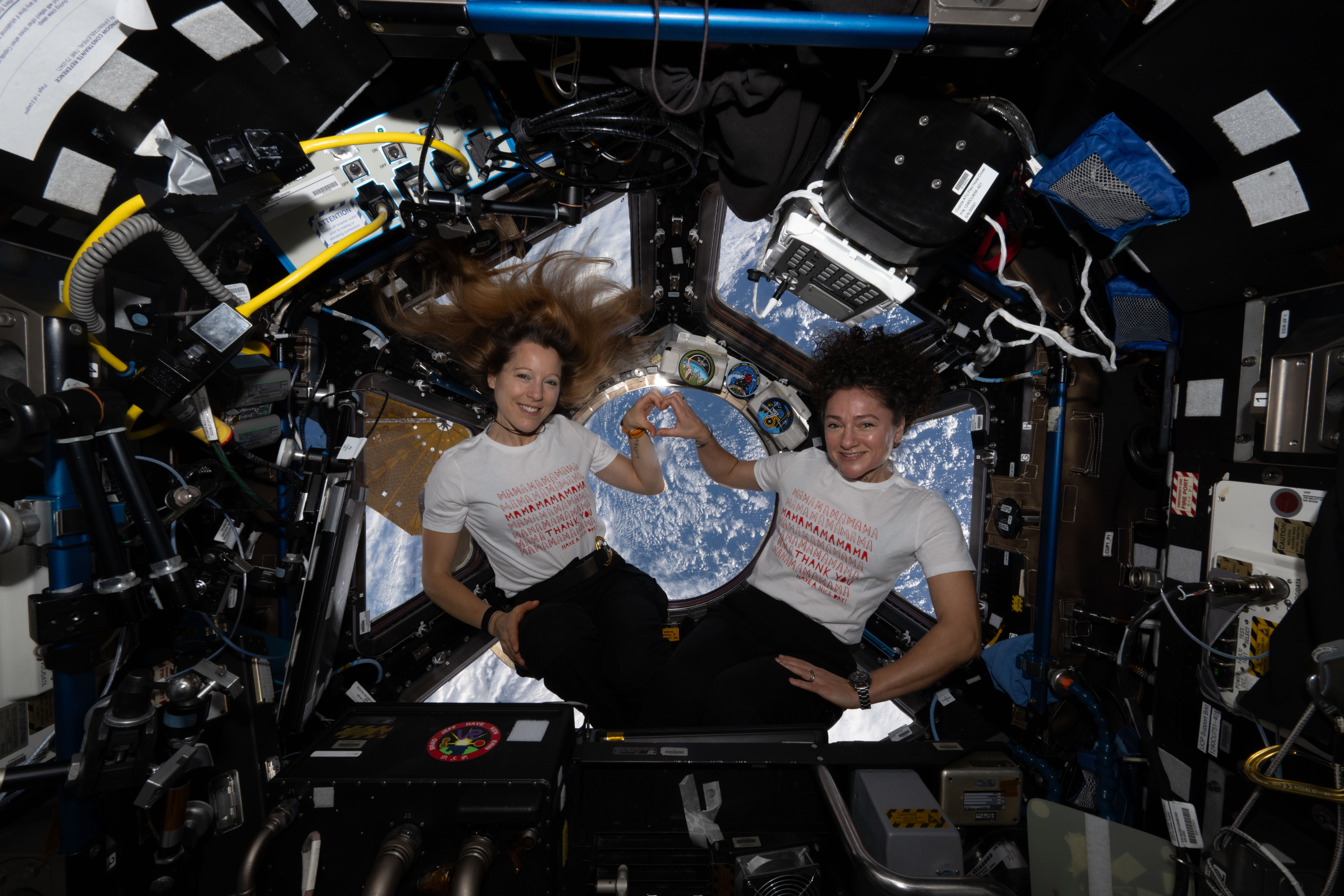
Astronauts Sophie Adenot and Jessica Meir celebrate Mother's Day (2nd Sunday in May) aboard the International Space Station

While the United States holiday was adopted by some other countries, existing celebrations, held on different dates, honoring motherhood have become described as "Mother's Day", such as Mothering Sunday in the United Kingdom or, in Greece, the Eastern Orthodox celebration of the presentation of Jesus Christ to the temple (2 February of Julian Calendar). Both the secular and religious Mother Day are present in Greece. Mothering Sunday is often referred to as "Mother's Day" even though it is an unrelated celebration.

In some countries, the date adopted is one significant to the majority religion, such as Virgin Mary Day in Catholic countries. Other countries selected a date with historical significance. For example, Bolivia's Mother's Day is a fixed date, May 27, commemorating a battle in which women participated to defend their children.

Some Ex-communist countries, such as Russia, celebrate International Women's Day instead of Mother's Day or simply celebrate both holidays, which is the custom in Ukraine. Recently in 2012, Kyrgyzstan introduced Mother's Day.

Dates in various countries
Gregorian calendar
Occurrence	Dates	Country
Second Sunday of February	9 February 2025; 8 February 2026; 14 February 2027	Norway
3 March		Georgia
8 March (with International Women's Day)		Albania; Armenia; Azerbaijan; Belarus; Bosnia and Herzegovina; Bulgaria; Burundi; Burkina Faso; Kazakhstan; Kosovo; Laos; Moldova; Montenegro; North Macedonia; Russia; Serbia; Tajikistan; Uzbekistan; Vietnam
Fourth Sunday in Lent (Mothering Sunday)	30 March 2025; 15 March 2026; 7 March 2027	Guernsey; Ireland; Isle of Man; Jersey; Nigeria; United Kingdom
21 March (Spring equinox)		Bahrain; Comoros; Djibouti; Egypt; Iraq; Jordan; Kuwait; Libya; Lebanon; Mauritania; Oman; Palestine; Qatar; Saudi Arabia; Somalia; Sudan; Syria; United Arab Emirates; Yemen
25 March		Slovenia
7 April (Annunciation day)		Armenia (Motherhood and Beauty Day)
First Sunday of May	4 May 2025; 3 May 2026; 2 May 2027	Angola; Cape Verde; Hungary; Andorra; Lithuania; Mozambique; Romania; Portugal; São Tomé and Príncipe; Spain
8 May		South Korea (Parents' Day)
10 May		El Salvador; Guatemala (working mothers only); Mexico
Second Sunday of May	11 May 2025; 10 May 2026; 9 May 2027	Anguilla; Antigua and Barbuda; Aruba; Australia; Austria; Bahamas; Bangladesh; Barbados; Belgium; Belize; Bermuda; Bhutan; Bonaire; Botswana; Brazil; Brunei; Canada; Cambodia; Cayman Islands; Central African Republic; Chad; Chile; China; Colombia; Congo, Dem. Rep.; Congo, Rep.; Cote d'Ivoire; Croatia; Cuba; Curaçao; Cyprus; Czech Republic; Denmark; Dominica; Ecuador; Equatorial Guinea; Estonia; Ethiopia; Faroe Islands; Fiji; Finland; Gabon; Gambia; Germany; Ghana; Greece; Greenland; Grenada; Guyana; Honduras; Hong Kong; Iceland; India; Italy; Jamaica; Japan; Kenya; Latvia; Liberia; Liechtenstein; Macau; Malaysia; Malta; Myanmar; Namibia; Netherlands; New Zealand; Pakistan; Papua New Guinea; Peru; Philippines; Saint Kitts and Nevis; Saint Lucia; Saint Vincent and the Grenadines; Samoa; Singapore; Sint Maarten; Slovakia; South Africa; Sri Lanka; Suriname; Switzerland; Taiwan; Tanzania; Tonga; Trinidad and Tobago; Turkey; Uganda; Ukraine; United States; Uruguay; Vietnam; Venezuela; Zambia; Zimbabwe
14 May		Benin
15 May		Paraguay (same day as Día de la Patria)
19 May		Kyrgyzstan (Russian: День матери, Kyrgyz: Энэ күнү)
26 May		Poland (Polish: Dzień Matki)
27 May		Bolivia
Last Sunday of May	25 May 2025; 31 May 2026; 30 May 2027	Algeria; Cameroon; Dominican Republic; Haiti; Madagascar; Mali; Mauritius; Morocco; Niger; Senegal; Sweden; Tunisia
Last Sunday of May, or first Sunday of June if the last Sunday of May is Pentecost	25 May 2025; 31 May 2026; 30 May 2027	France; French Antilles
30 May		Nicaragua
1 June		Mongolia (together with Children's Day)
Second Sunday of June	8 June 2025; 14 June 2026; 13 June 2027	Luxembourg
14 June		Afghanistan
First Monday of July	7 July 2025; 6 July 2026; 5 July 2027	South Sudan
12 August		Thailand (birthday of Queen Sirikit)
15 August (Assumption of Mary)		Antwerp (Belgium); Costa Rica
Third Sunday of September	21 September 2025 20 September 2026; 19 September 2027	Kazakhstan
14 October		Belarus (since 1996)
15 October, or following work day	15 October 2025; 15 October 2026; 15 October 2027	Malawi
20 October		Vietnam (Vietnamese Women's Day)
Third Sunday of October	19 October 2025; 18 October 2026; 17 October 2027	Argentina (Día de la Madre)
3 November		Timor Leste
16 November		North Korea
Last Sunday of November	30 November 2025; 29 November 2026; 28 November 2027	Russia
8 December (Feast of the Immaculate Conception)		Panama
22 December		Indonesia (Hari Ibu)
Hebrew calendar
Occurrence	Equivalent Gregorian dates	Country
30 Shevat	Between 30 January and 1 March 28 February 2025; 17 February 2026; 7 February 2027	Israel (Family Day)
Hindu calendar
Occurrence	Equivalent Gregorian dates	Country
Vaisakha Amavasya (Mata Tirtha Aunsi)	Between 19 April and 19 May	Nepal
Islamic calendar
Occurrence	Equivalent Gregorian dates	Country
20 Jumada II	11 December 2025; 30 November 2026; 19 November 2027	Iran
Vietnamese calendar
Occurrence	Equivalent Gregorian dates	Country
15th day of seventh month	Between 6 August and 6 September 6 September 2025; 29 June 2026; 19 June 2027	Vietnam (Vu-lan Báo Hiếu)

== International history and tradition ==
Mother's Day in the Netherlands in 1925

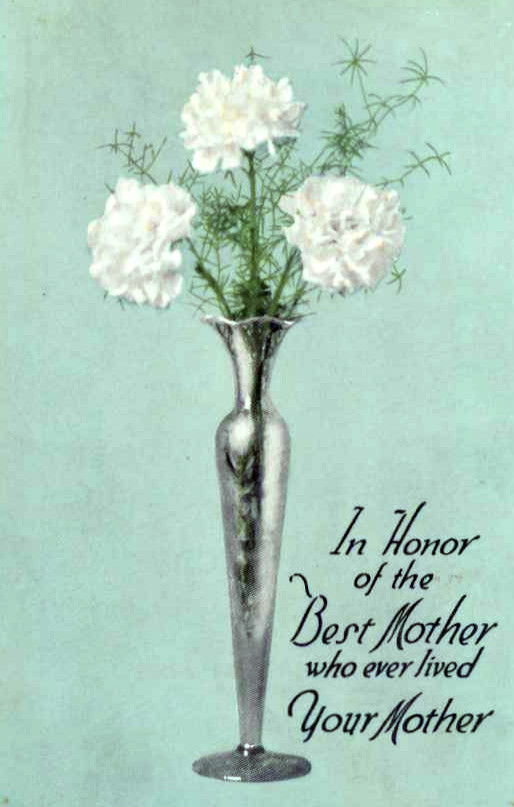
Northern Pacific Railway postcard for Mother's Day 1916.

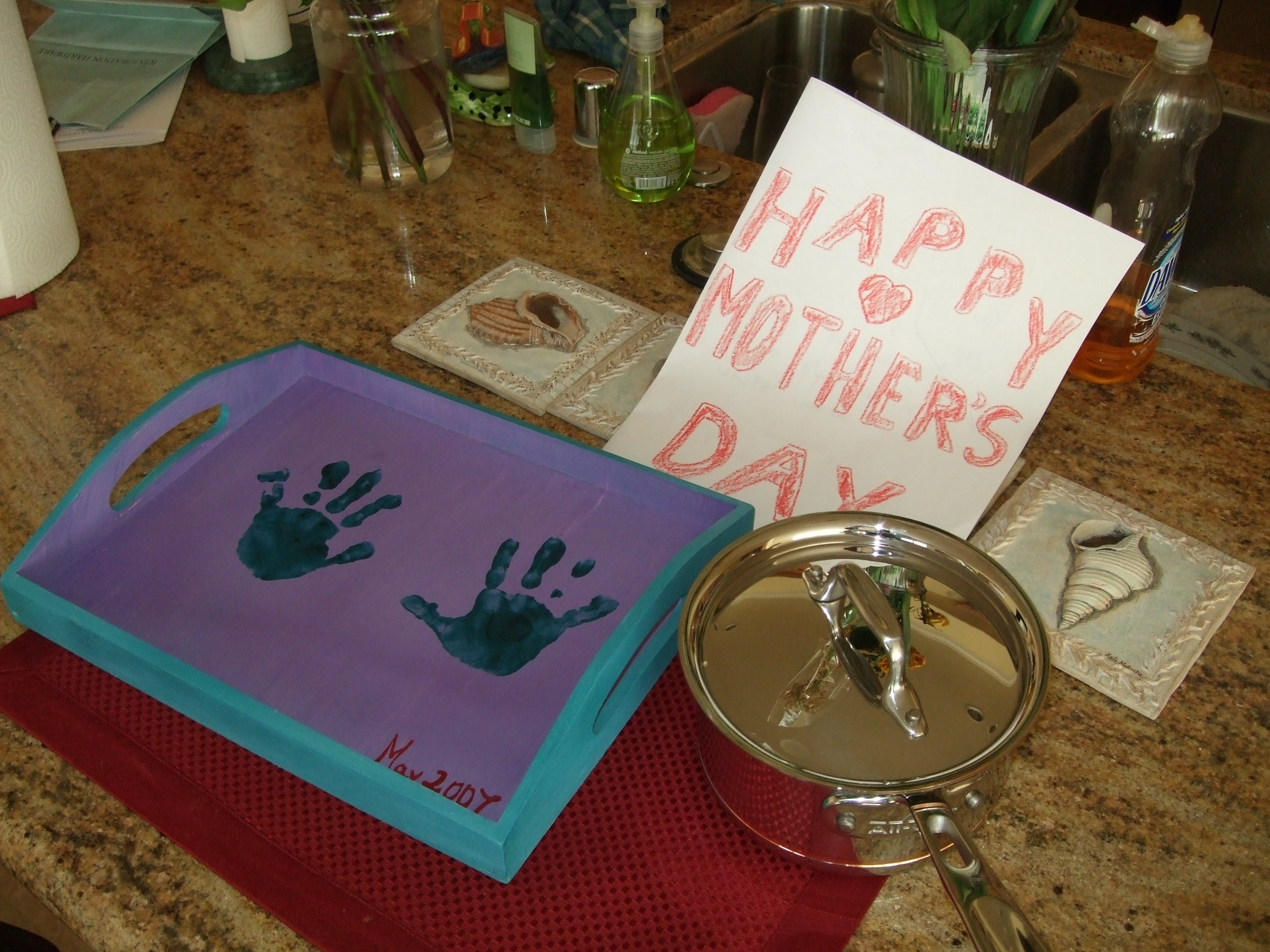
Mother's Day gift in 2007

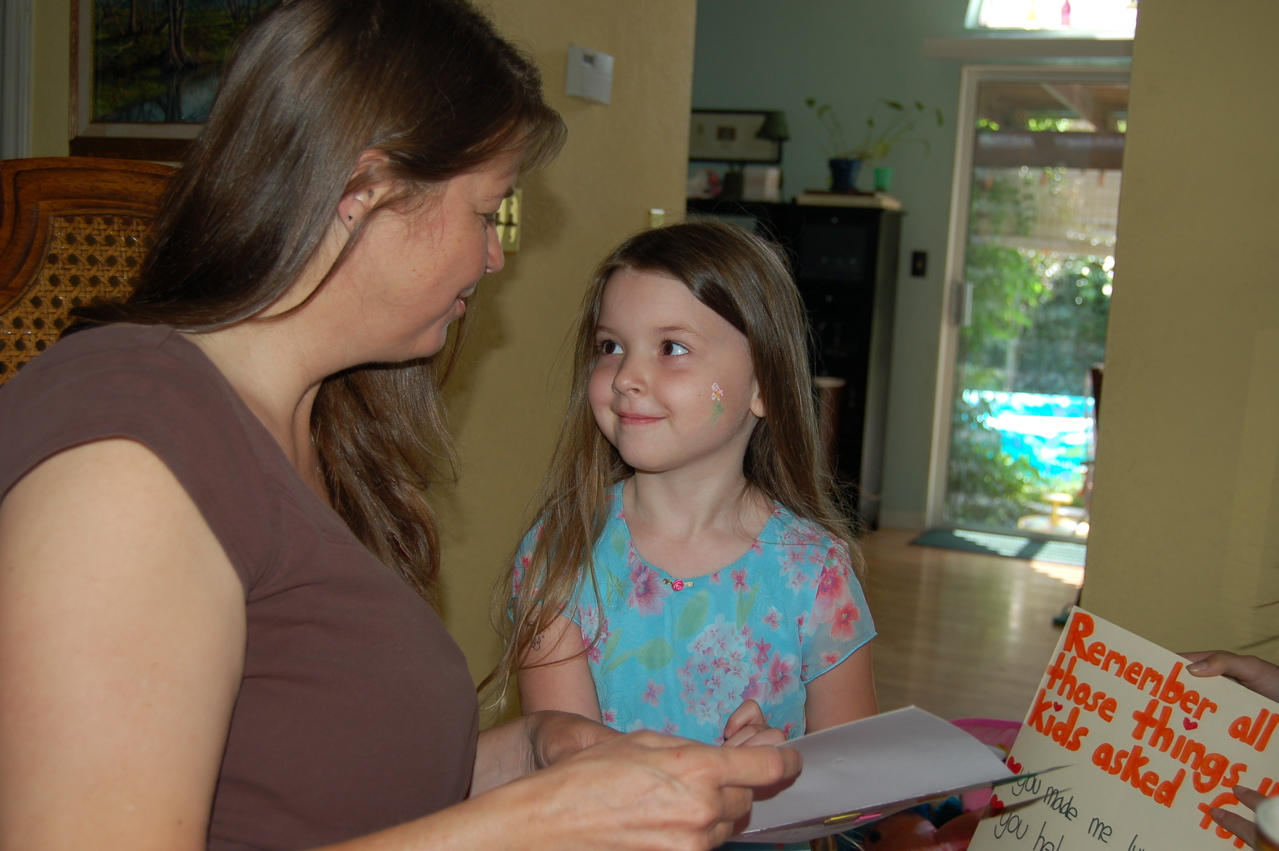
Mother and daughter and Mother's Day card

In most countries, Mother's Day is an observance derived from the holiday as it has evolved in the United States, promoted by companies who saw benefit in making it popular. As adopted by other countries and cultures, the holiday has different meanings, is associated with different events (religious, historical or legendary), and is celebrated on different dates.

In some cases, countries already had existing celebrations honoring motherhood, and their celebrations then adopted several external characteristics from the US holiday, such as giving carnations and other presents to one's mother.

The extent of the celebrations varies greatly. In some countries, it is potentially offensive to one's mother not to mark Mother's Day. In others, it is a little-known festival celebrated mainly by immigrants, or covered by the media as a taste of foreign culture.

=== Religion ===
In certain traditional branches of Christianity, the holiday is strongly associated with revering the Virgin Mary. In some Catholic, Lutheran and Anglican homes, families have a special shrine on their home altar devoted to the Blessed Virgin Mary. In many Eastern Catholic and Eastern Orthodox Churches, a special prayer service is held in honor of the Theotokos Virgin Mary.

In Islam, special attention is paid to mothers. The Islamic prophet Muhammad said in this regard: "The Paradise is beneath mother's feet." While there is no concept of Mother's Day in Islam, the Quran teaches that children should give priority to loving their mother over their father. The Quran also mentions the status and respect of for mothers in many verses: Surah Al-Isra, verse 23; Al-Ahqaf, verse 15; Luqman, verse 14; and Al-Baqarah, verse 233.

In Hindu tradition, Mother's Day is called "Mata Tirtha Aunshi" or "Mother Pilgrimage fortnight", and is celebrated in countries with a Hindu population, especially in Nepal, where mothers are honored with special foods. The holiday is observed on the new moon day in the month of Baisakh, i.e., April/May. This celebration is based on the Hindu religion and it pre-dates the creation of the US-inspired celebration by at least a few centuries.

In Buddhism, the festival of Ullambana is derived from the story of Maudgalyayana and his mother.

=== By country ===
==== Albania ====
In Albania, as in a number of Balkan and Eastern European countries, Mother's Day is celebrated on 8 March, in conjunction with International Women's Day.

==== Arab world ====
Mother's Day in most Arab countries is celebrated on 21 March. It was introduced in Egypt by journalist Mustafa Amin and was first celebrated in 1956. The practice has since been adopted by other Arab countries.

==== Argentina ====
In Argentina, Mother's Day is celebrated on the third Sunday of October. The holiday was originally celebrated on 11 October, the old liturgical date for the celebration of the Maternity of the Blessed Virgin Mary but after the Second Vatican Council, which moved the Virgin Mary festivity to 1 January, the Mother's Day started to be celebrated the third Sunday of October because of popular tradition. Argentina is the only country in the world that celebrates Mother's Day on this date.

==== Armenia ====
In Armenia, Mother's Day is celebrated on 8 March, and on 7 April as Maternity and Beauty Day.

==== Australia ====
In Australia, Mother's Day is celebrated on the second Sunday in May. Australia celebrated Mother’s Day for the first time in 1910 with special church services, however, it was not popularly observed until the 1920s. Because it is autumn in Australia for Mother’s Day, and carnations are a spring flower, white chrysanthemums are the traditional Mother’s Day flower in Australia.

==== Bangladesh ====
There is no historical tradition of celebrating Mother's Day (Bengali: মা দিবস, romanized: Mā Dibôs) in Bangladesh, and it has become popular in the country due to western influences. It is celebrated on the second Sunday of May and is not a public holiday. Mother's Day was not very popular and in recent times it has been spread more widely by the Millennial and Generation Z communities across the country through social media. Although many religious families do not celebrate it, it is more widespread than ever before. There is a popular phrase used by many parents, including mothers, which is "Every day is Father's/Mother's Day so you will love your parents every day." Most people just wish or pray for their mother, but many from big cities like Dhaka, Chittagong, Khulna, Sylhet, Barishal, Narayangonj, Bogura etc. go to restaurants to celebrate, many also cut cakes. Many others cut cakes at home or order meals online. Some children may give small gifts to their mothers.

==== Belarus ====
Belarus celebrates Mother's Day on 14 October. Like other ex-Communist republics, Belarus used to celebrate only International Women's Day on 8 March. Mother's Day in Belarus was officially established by the Belarusian government, and it was celebrated for the first time in 1996. The celebration of the Virgin Mary (the holiday of Protection of the Holy Mother of God) is celebrated on the same day.

==== Bhutan ====
Mother's Day in Bhutan is celebrated on 8 May. It was introduced in Bhutan by the Tourism Council of Bhutan.

==== Belgium ====
In Belgium, Mother's Day (Moederdag or Moederkesdag in Dutch and Fête des Mères in French) is celebrated on the second Sunday of May. In the week before this holiday children make little presents at primary school, which they give to their mothers in the early morning of Mother's Day. Typically, the father will buy croissants and other sweet breads and pastries and bring these to the mother while she is still in bed – the beginning of a day of pampering for the mother. There are also many people who celebrate Mother's Day on 15 August instead; these are mostly people around Antwerp, who consider that day (Assumption) the classical Mother's Day and the observance in May an invention for commercial reasons. It was originally established on that day as the result of a campaign by Frans Van Kuyck, a painter and Alderman from Antwerp.

==== Bolivia ====
In Bolivia, Mother's Day is celebrated on 27 May. El Día de la Madre Boliviana was passed into law on 8 November 1927, during the presidency of Hernando Siles Reyes. The date commemorates the Battle of La Coronilla, which took place on 27 May 1812, during the Bolivian War of Independence, in what is now the city of Cochabamba. In this battle, women fighting for the country's independence were slaughtered by the Spanish army. It is not a public holiday, but all schools hold activities and festivities throughout the day.

==== Brazil ====
In Brazil, Mother's Day is celebrated on the second Sunday of May. The first Mother's Day in Brazil was promoted by Associação Cristã de Moços de Porto Alegre (Young Men's Christian Association of Porto Alegre) on 12 May 1918. In 1932, then President Getúlio Vargas made the second Sunday of May the official date for Mother's Day. In 1947, Archbishop Jaime de Barros Câmara, Cardinal-Archbishop of Rio de Janeiro, decided that this holiday would also be included in the official calendar of the Catholic Church.

Mother's Day is not an official holiday (see Public holidays in Brazil), but it is widely observed and typically involves spending time with and giving gifts to one's mother. Because of this, it is considered one of the celebrations most related to consumerism in the country, second only to Christmas Day as the most commercially lucrative holiday.

==== Canada ====
See also Other observances in Canada

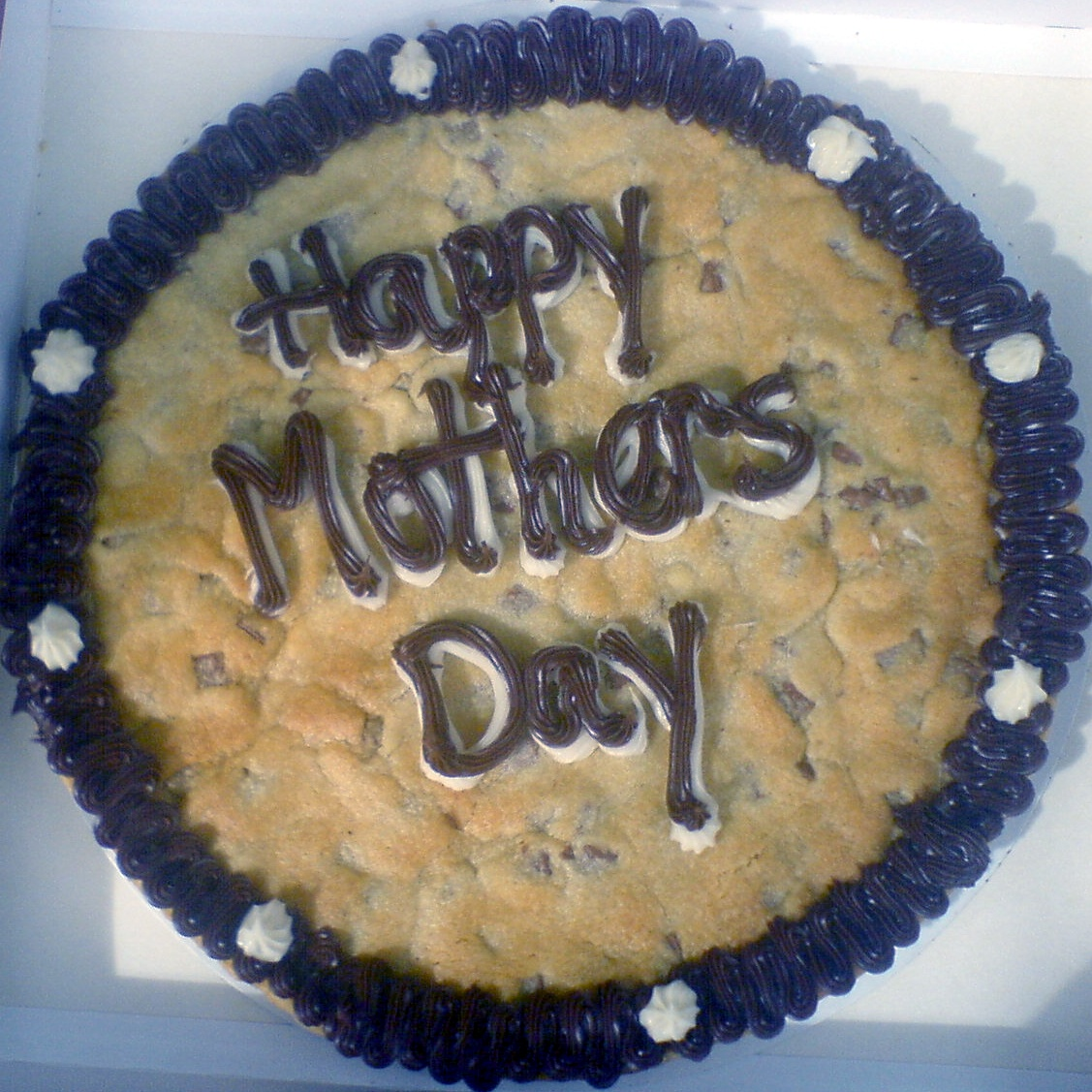
Mother's Day cookie cake

Mother's Day in Canada is celebrated on the second Sunday in May (it is not a public holiday or bank holiday), and typically involves small celebrations and gift-giving to one's mother, grandmother, or other important female figures in one's family. Celebratory practices are very similar to those of other western nations. A Québécois tradition is for Québécois men to offer roses or other flowers to the women.

==== China ====
Mother's Day is becoming more popular in China. Carnations are a very popular Mother's Day gift and the most sold flowers in relation to the day. In 1997 Mother's Day was set as the day to help poor mothers and to remind people of the poor mothers in rural areas such as China's western region. In the People's Daily, the Chinese government's official newspaper, an article explained that "despite originating in the United States, people in China accept the holiday without hesitation because it is in line with the country's traditional ethics – respect for the elderly and filial piety towards parents."

In recent years, the Communist Party member Li Hanqiu began to advocate for the official adoption of Mother's Day in memory of Meng Mu, the mother of Mèng Zǐ. He formed a non-governmental organization called Chinese Mothers' Festival Promotion Society, with the support of 100 Confucian scholars and lecturers of ethics. Li and the Society want to replace the Western-style gift of carnations with lilies, which, in ancient times, were planted by Chinese mothers when children left home. Mother's Day remains an unofficial festival, except in a small number of cities.

==== Costa Rica ====
In Costa Rica, Mother's Day is celebrated on 15 August. In 1927, at the Nicolás Ulloa School in Heredia, Evangelina Solís founded an annual event that would celebrate the mothers of the students. It was held around the time of the distribution of midterm notes, in July. Evangelina's reasoning was that mothers should be congratulated for their children's successes. The event gained national traction and was enacted into law in 1932. The final date of 15 August was chosen as it coincided with the celebration of Assumption of Mary, mother of Jesus.

==== Czech Republic ====
In the Czech Republic, Mother's Day is celebrated every second Sunday in May. It started in former Czechoslovakia in 1923. The promoter of this celebration was Alice Masaryková. After World War II communists replaced Mother's Day with International Woman's Day, celebrated on 8 March. The former Czechoslovakia celebrated Women's Day until the Velvet Revolution in 1989. After the split of the country in 1993, the Czech Republic started celebrating Mother's Day again.

==== Egypt ====
Mother's Day in Egypt is celebrated on 21 March, the first day of spring in the northern hemisphere. It was introduced in Egypt by journalist Mustafa Amin in his book Smiling America (1943). The idea was overlooked at the time. Later Amin heard the story of a widowed mother who devoted her whole life to raising her son until he became a doctor. The son then married and left without showing any gratitude to his mother. Hearing this, Amin became motivated to promote "Mother's Day". The idea was first ridiculed by president Gamal Abdel Nasser but he eventually accepted it and Mother's Day was first celebrated on 21 March 1956. The practice has since been copied by other Arab countries.

When Mustafa Amin was arrested and imprisoned, the government changed the name of the holiday from "Mother's Day" to "Family Day", but they reverted the name after Egyptian mothers wrote to complain. Celebrations continued to be held on the same date and classic songs celebrating mothers remain famous to this day.

==== Ethiopia ====
Mother's Day is celebrated for three days in Ethiopia, after the end of the rainy season. It comes in mid-fall where people enjoy a three-day feast called "Antrosht".

For the feast, ingredients will be brought by the children for a traditional hash recipe. The ingredients are divided along genders, with girls bringing spices, vegetables, cheese and butter, while the boys bring a lamb or bull. The mother hands out the hash to the family.

A celebration takes place after the meal. The mothers and daughters anoint themselves using butter on their faces and chests. While honoring their family and heroes, men sing songs.

==== Estonia ====
In Estonia, Mother's Day (emadepäev in Estonian) is celebrated on the second Sunday of May. It is recognized nationally, but is not a public holiday.

==== Finland ====
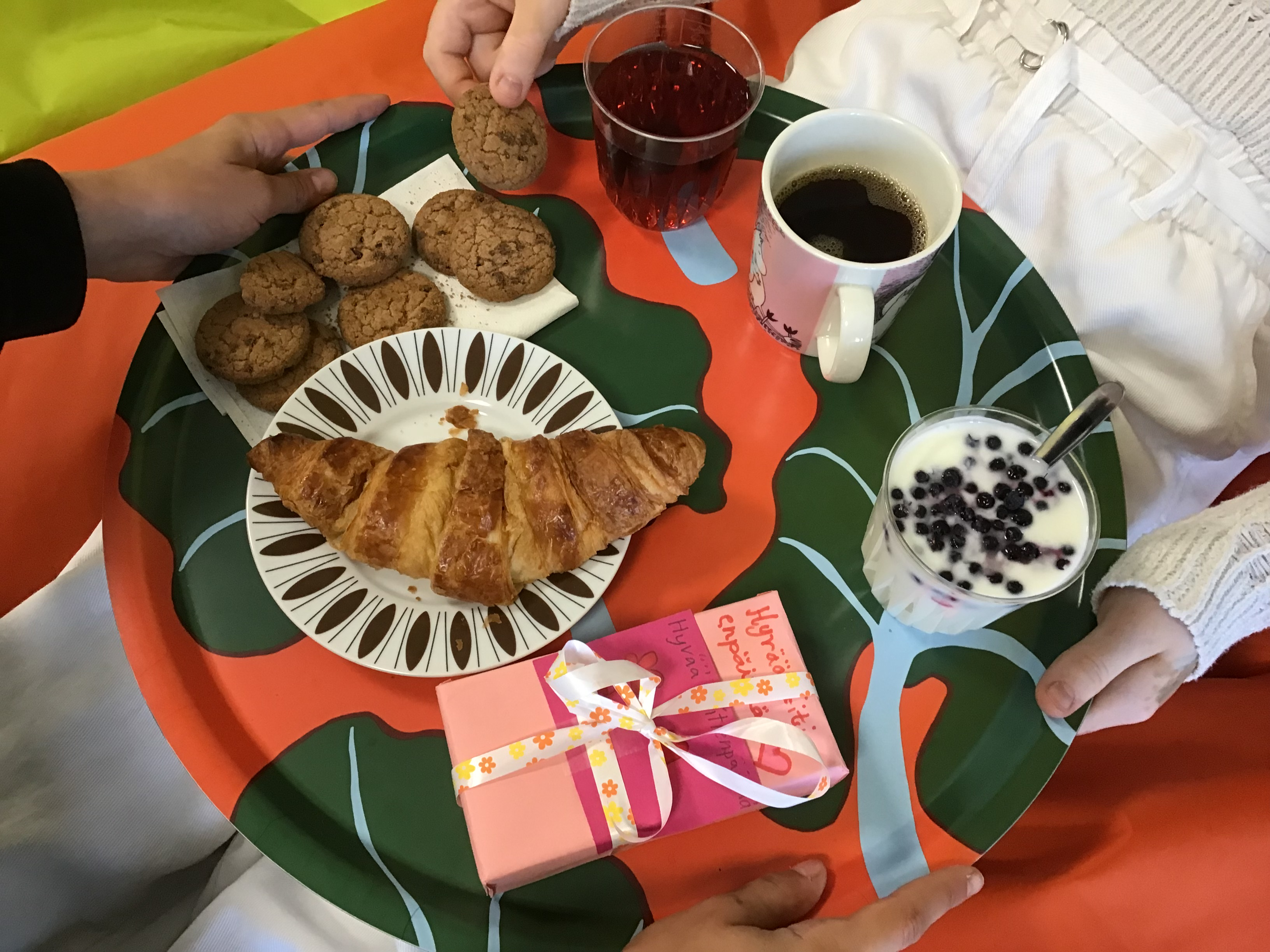
Mother's Day breakfast in Finland

In Finland, Mother's Day (äitienpäivä in Finnish) is celebrated on the second Sunday of May. It is recognized nationally and is a public holiday. It is usually celebrated at homes where children or grandchildren bring Mother's day cards that they have drawn to their mothers and grandmothers. Usually, some food, coffee and cakes are served for guests. Grown up children visit their parents' homes and bring traditionally Mother's day roses or other flowers accompanied by a Mother's day card. The president of Finland honors with medals every year some mothers who have done something exceptional and positive during the year.

==== France ====
In France, amidst alarm at the low birth rate, there were attempts in 1896 and 1904 to create a national celebration honoring the mothers of large families. In 1906 ten mothers who had nine children each were given an award recognising "High Maternal Merit" ("Haut mérite maternel"). American World War I soldiers fighting in France popularized the US Mother's Day holiday created by Anna Jarvis. They sent so much mail back to their country for Mother's Day that the Union Franco-Américaine created a postal card for that purpose. In 1918, also inspired by Jarvis, the town of Lyon wanted to celebrate a "journée des Mères", but instead decided to celebrate a "Journée Nationale des Mères de familles nombreuses." The holiday was more inspired by anti-depopulation efforts than by the US holiday, with medals awarded to the mothers of large families. The French government made the day official in 1920 as a day for mothers of large families. Since then the French government awards the Médaille de l'enfance et des familles to mothers of large families.

In 1941, by an initiative of Philippe Pétain, the wartime Vichy government used the celebration in support of their policy to encourage larger families, but all mothers were now honored, even mothers with smaller families.

In 1950, after the war, the celebration was reinstated. The law of 24 May 1950 required (in Article 1) that the Republic pay official homage to French Mothers. Article 2 stated it should be celebrated on the last Sunday in May as the "Fête des Mères" (except when Pentecost fell on that day, in which case it was moved to the first Sunday in June). Article 3 stated that all expenditure shall be covered from the budget of the Ministry of Public Health and Population.

During the 1950s, the celebration lost all its patriotic and natalist ideologies, and became heavily commercialized.

In 1956, the celebration was given a budget and integrated into the new Code de l'action Sociale et des familles. In 2004 responsibility for the holiday was transferred to the Minister responsible for families.

==== Georgia ====
Georgia celebrates Mother's Day on 3 March. It was declared by the first President of Georgia Zviad Gamsakhurdia in order to replace the International Women Day, and it was officially approved by the Supreme Council in 1991. Nowadays Georgia celebrates both Mother's Day on 3 March and International Women's Day on 8 March.

==== Germany ====
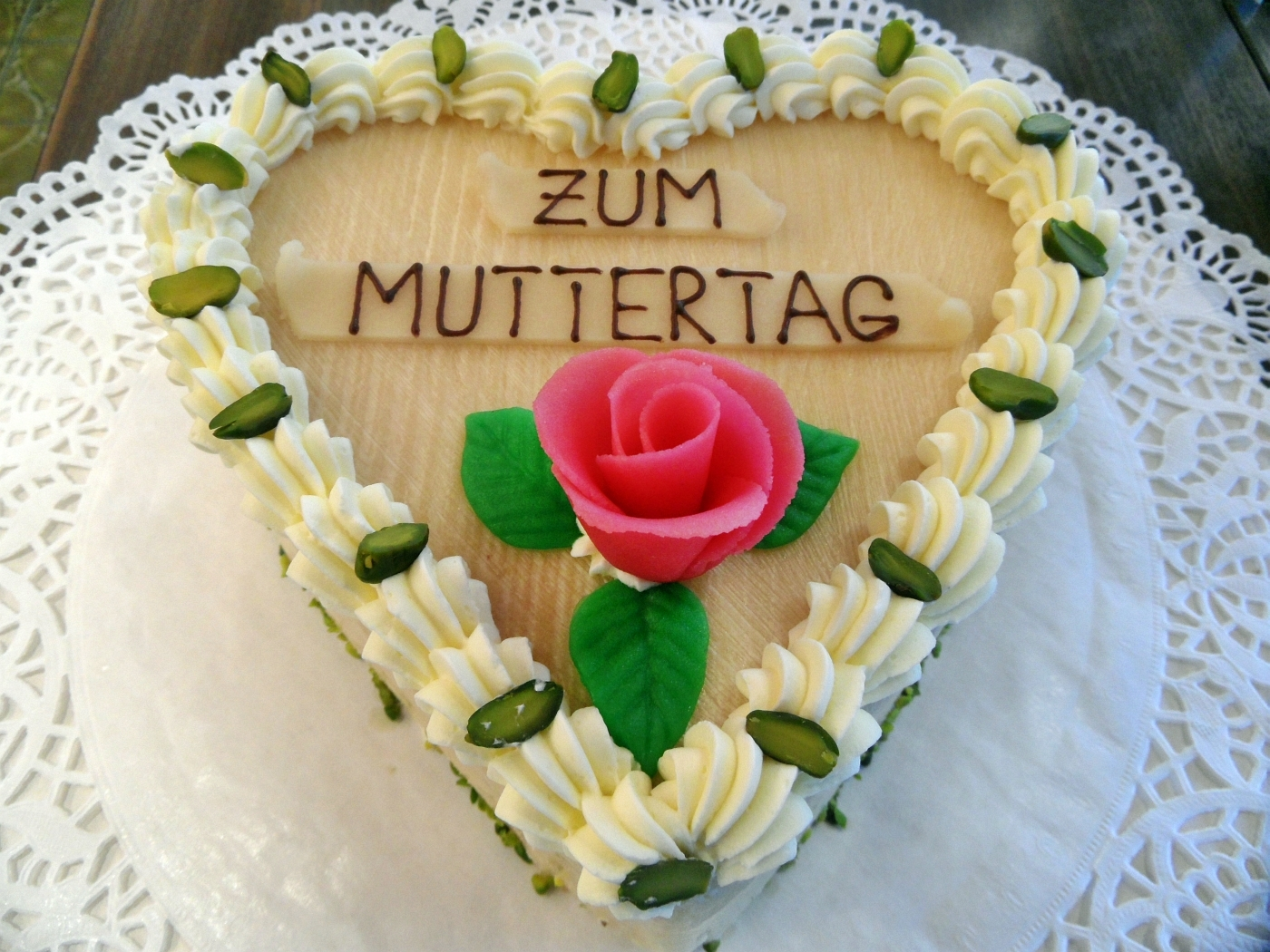
Mother's Day cake in Germany

Germany celebrates Mother's Day on the 2nd Sunday in May.

In the 1920s, Germany had the lowest birthrate in Europe, and the declining trend was continuing. This was attributed to women's participation in the labor market. At the same time, influential groups in society (politicians of left and right, churchwomen, and feminists) believed that mothers should be honored but could not agree on how to do so. However, all groups strongly agreed on the promotion of the values of motherhood. In 1923, this resulted in the unanimous adoption of Muttertag, the Mother's Day holiday as imported from America. The head of the Association of German Florists cited "the inner conflict of our Volk and the loosening of the family" as his reason for introducing the holiday. He expected that the holiday would unite the divided country. In 1925, the Mother's Day Committee joined the task force for the recovery of the volk, and the holiday stopped depending on commercial interests and began emphasizing the need to increase the population in Germany by promoting motherhood.

The holiday was then seen as a means to encourage women to bear more children, which nationalists saw as a way to rejuvenate the nation. The holiday did not celebrate individual women, but an idealized standard of motherhood. The progressive forces resisted the implementation of the holiday because it was backed by so many conservatives and because they saw it as a way to eliminate the rights of working women. Die Frau, the newspaper of the Federation of German Women's Associations, refused to recognize the holiday. Many local authorities adopted their own interpretation of the holiday: it would be a day to support economically larger families or single-mother families. The guidelines for the subsidies had eugenics criteria, but there is no indication that social workers ever implemented them in practice, and subsidies were given preferentially to families in economic need rather than to families with more children or "healthier" children.

With the Nazi party in power during 1933–1945, the situation changed radically. The promotion of Mother's Day increased in many European countries, including the UK and France. From the position of the German Nazi government, the role of mothers was to give healthy children to the German nation. The Nazi party's intention was to create a pure "Aryan race" according to nazi eugenics. Among other Mother's Day ideas, the government promoted the death of a mother's sons in battle as the highest embodiment of patriotic motherhood.

The Nazis quickly declared Mother's Day an official holiday and put it under the control of the NSV (National Socialist People's Welfare) and the NSF (National Socialist Women's League). This created conflicts with other organizations that resented Nazi control of the holiday, including Catholic and Protestant churches and local women's organizations. Local authorities resisted the guidelines from the Nazi government and continued assigning resources to families who were in economic need, much to the dismay of the Nazi officials.

In 1938, the government began issuing an award called Mother's Cross (Mutterkreuz), according to categories that depended on the number of children a mother had. The medal was awarded on Mother's Day and also on other holidays due to a large number of recipients. The Cross was an effort to encourage women to have more children, and recipients were required to have at least four.

==== Hungary ====
In Hungary, Mother's Day is celebrated on the first Sunday of May. It was first celebrated in 1925 by the Hungarian Red Cross Youth.

==== India ====
The modern Mother's Day has been assimilated into Indian culture and is celebrated every year on the second Sunday of May. Indians do not celebrate the occasion as a religious event; its celebration is mostly restricted to urban areas where the occasion has been largely commercialized.

==== Indonesia ====
Indonesian Mother's Day (Indonesian: Hari Ibu) is celebrated nationally on 22 December. The date was made an official holiday by President Sukarno under Presidential Decree No. 316/1953, on the 25th anniversary of the 1928 Indonesian Women Congress. The day originally sought to celebrate the spirit of Indonesian women and to improve the condition of the nation. Today, the meaning of Mother's Day has changed, and it is celebrated by expressing love and gratitude to mothers. People present gifts to mothers (such as flowers) and hold surprise parties and competitions, which include cooking and kebaya wearing. People also allow mothers a day off from domestic chores.

The holiday is celebrated on the anniversary of the opening day of the first Indonesian Women Congress (Kongres Perempuan Indonesia), which was held from 22 to 25 December 1928. The Congress took place in a building called Dalem Jayadipuran, which now serves as the office of the Center of History and Traditional Values Preservation (Balai Pelestarian Sejarah dan Nilai Tradisional) in Brigjen Katamso Street, Yogyakarta. The Congress was attended by 30 feminist organizations from 12 cities in Java and Sumatra. In Indonesia, feminist organizations have existed since 1912, inspired by Indonesian heroines of the 19th century, e.g., Kartini, Martha Christina Tiahahu, Cut Nyak Meutia, Maria Walanda Maramis, Dewi Sartika, Nyai Ahmad Dahlan, Rasuna Said, etc. The Congress intended to improve women's rights in education and marriage.

Indonesia also celebrates the Kartini Day (Hari Kartini) on 21 April, in memory of activist Raden Ajeng Kartini. This is a celebration of the emancipation of women. The observance was instituted at the 1938 Indonesian Women Congress.

During President Suharto's New Order (1965–1998), government propaganda used Mother's Day and Kartini Day to inculcate into women the idea that they should be docile and stay at home.

==== Iran ====
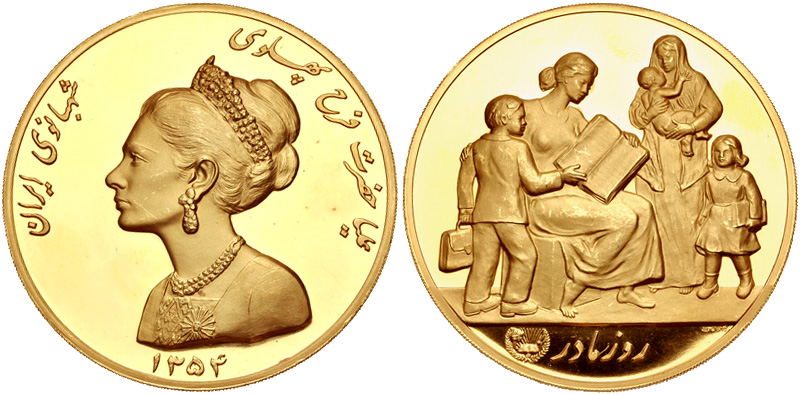
Commemorative gold medal issued in the Pahlavi era on the occasion of Mother's Day, dated 1975. Obv: Bust of Empress Farah Pahlavi. Rev: Mother and children standing around a seated Farah Pahlavi, holding open book

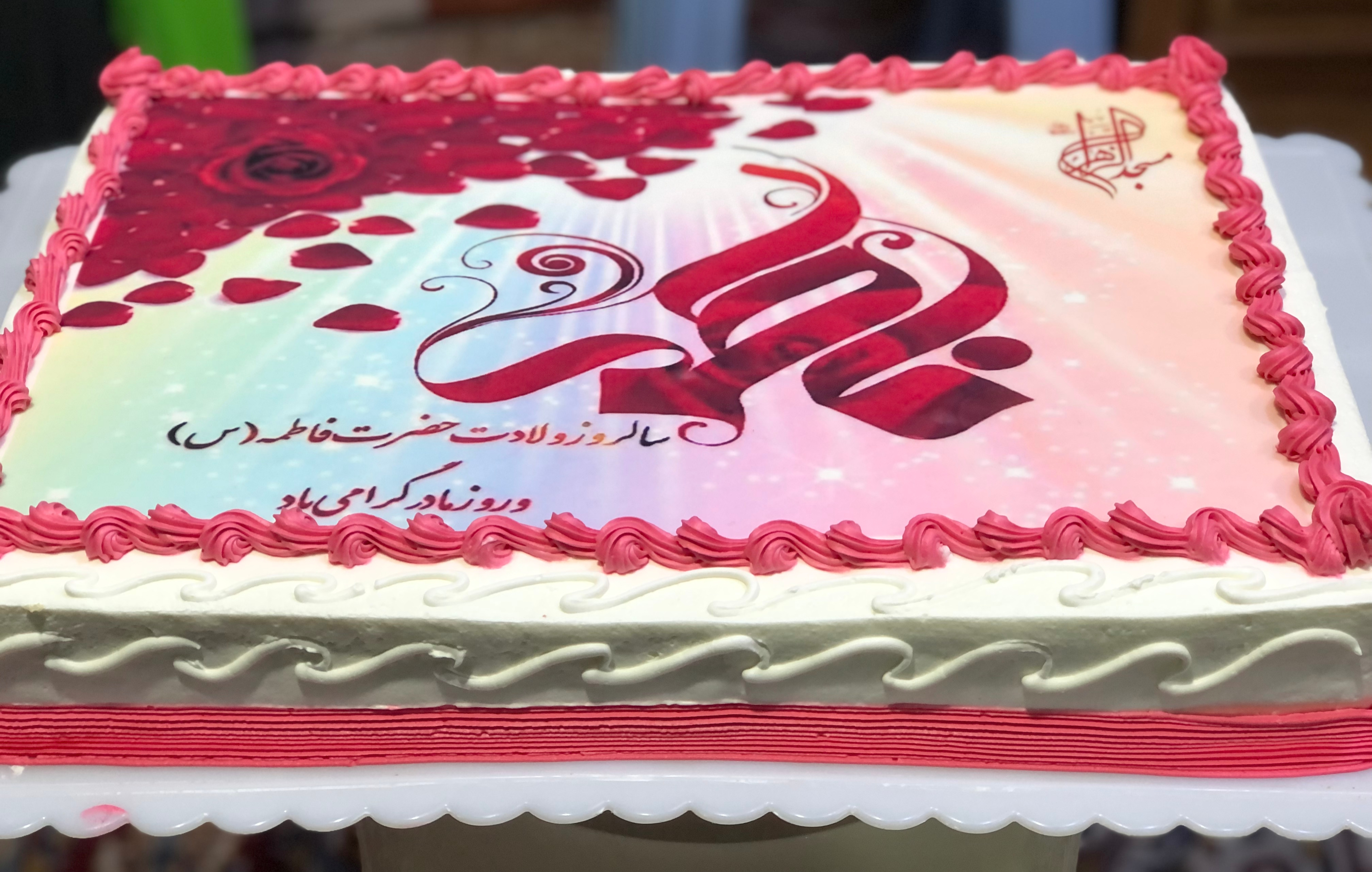
Celebration of the Mother's Day

In Iran, Mother's Day is celebrated on 20 Jumada II. This is the sixth month in the Islamic calendar (a lunar calendar) and every year the holiday falls on a different day of the Gregorian calendar. This is the birthday anniversary of Fatimah, Muhammad's only daughter according to Shia Islam. On this day, banners reading "Ya Fatemeah (O! Fatemeh)" are displayed on "government buildings, private buildings, public streets and car windows." Mother's Day was originally observed on 16 December but the date was changed after the Iranian Revolution in 1979. The celebration is both Women's Day (replacing International Women's Day) and Mother's Day.

In 1960, the Institute for Women Protection adopted the Western holiday and established it on 25 Azar (16 December), the date the Institute was founded. The Institute's action had the support of Empress Farah Pahlavi, the wife of the last Shah of Persia, who promoted the construction of maternity clinics in remote parts of the country to commemorate the day. Pahlavi regime used the holiday to promote "gender ideologies" of the regime. The Shah's government honored and gave awards to women who represented the idealized view of the regime, including mothers who had many healthy children.

According to Shahla Haeri, the Islamic Republic government has used the holiday to "control and channel women's movements" and to promote role models for the traditional concept of family. Fatimah is seen by these critics as the chosen model of a woman completely dedicated to certain traditionally sanctioned feminine roles. However, supporters of the choice contend that there is much more to her life story than simply such "traditional" roles.

==== Ireland ====
In Ireland, Mother's Day is celebrated on the fourth Sunday of Lent, as in the United Kingdom, and has the same roots in Mothering Sunday. The practice died out in Ireland around the late 18th century but was revived around the 1950s due to Americanisation.

==== Israel ====
The Jewish population of Israel used to celebrate Mother's Day on Shevat 30 of the Jewish calendar, which falls between 30 January and 1 March. The celebration was set as the same date that Henrietta Szold died (13 February 1945). Henrietta had no biological children, but her organization Youth Aliyah rescued many Jewish children from Nazi Germany and provided for them. She also championed children's rights. Szold is considered the "mother" of all those children, and that is why her annual remembrance day (יום השנה) was set as Mother's Day (יוֹם הָאֵם, yom ha'em). The holiday has evolved over time, becoming a celebration of mutual love inside the family, called Family Day (יוֹם הַמִשְּפָּחָה, yom hamishpacha). This holiday is mainly celebrated in preschools with an activity to which parents are invited. Mother's Day is mainly celebrated by children at kindergartens. There are no longer mutual gifts among members of the family, and there is no longer any commercialization of the celebration. It is not an official holiday.

==== Italy ====
Mother's Day in Italy was celebrated for the first time on 24 December 1933 as the "Day of the mother and the child" (Giornata della madre e del fanciullo). It was instituted by the Opera nazionale maternità e infanzia in order to publicly reward the most prolific Italian women every year.

After World War II, Mother's Day was first celebrated on 12 May 1957 in Assisi, at the initiative of Reverend Otello Migliosi, the parish priest of the Tordibetto church. This celebration was so popular that in the following year Mother's Day was adopted throughout Italy. On 18 December 1958, a proposal was presented to the Italian Senate to make the holiday official.

==== Japan ====
In Japan, Mother's Day (母の日, Haha no Hi) was initially commemorated during the Shōwa period as the birthday of Empress Kōjun (mother of Emperor Akihito) on 6 March. This was established in 1931 when the Imperial Women's Union was organized. In 1937, the first meeting of "Praise Mothers" was held on 8 May, and in 1949 Japanese society adopted the second Sunday of May as the official date for Mother's Day in Japan. Today, people typically give their mothers gifts of flowers such as red carnations and roses. Giving carnations on Mother's Day is the most common in Japan.

==== Kyrgyzstan ====
In Kyrgyzstan, Mother's Day is celebrated on 19 May every year. The holiday was first celebrated in 2012. Mothers are also honored on International Women's Day

==== Latvia ====
Mother's Day in Latvia was celebrated for the first time in 1922. Since 1934, Mother's Day is celebrated on the second Sunday of May. After the end of the Soviet occupation of Baltic states celebration was resumed in 1992. Mothers are also honored on International Women's Day.

==== Lithuania ====
Mother's Day in Lithuania was celebrated for the first time in 1929. In Lithuania, Mother's Day is celebrated on the first Sunday of May.

==== Malawi ====
In Malawi, Mother's Day is a public holiday. The day is observed on 15 October or the following workday. It is celebrated on the UN's World Rural Women's Day.

==== Maldives ====
In the Maldives, Mother's Day is celebrated on 13 May. The day is celebrated in different ways. Children give gifts and spend time with their mothers. Daughters give their mothers cards and handmade gifts and sons give their mothers gifts and flowers. Maldivians love to celebrate Mother's day, and they have it specially written on their calendar.

==== Malta ====
The first mention of Mother's Day in Malta occurred during the Radio Children's Programmes run by Frans H. Said in May 1961. Within a few years, Mother's Day became one of the most popular dates in the Maltese calendar. In Malta, this day is commemorated on the second Sunday in May. Mothers are invariably given gifts and invited for lunch, usually at a good quality restaurant.

==== Mexico ====
In Mexico, the government of Álvaro Obregón imported the Mother's Day holiday from the US in 1922, and the newspaper Excélsior held a massive promotional campaign for the holiday that year. The conservative government tried to use the holiday to promote a more conservative role for mothers in families, but that perspective was criticized by the socialists as promoting an unrealistic image of a woman who was not good for much more than breeding.

In the mid-1930s, the leftist government of Lázaro Cárdenas promoted the holiday as a "patriotic festival". The Cárdenas government tried to use the holiday as a vehicle for various efforts: to stress the importance of families as the basis for national development; to benefit from the loyalty that Mexicans felt towards their mothers; to introduce new morals to Mexican women; and to reduce the influence that the church and the Catholic right exerted over women. The government sponsored the holiday in the schools. However, ignoring the strict guidelines from the government, theatre plays were filled with religious icons and themes. Consequently, the "national celebrations" became "religious fiestas" despite the efforts of the government.

Soledad Orozco García, the wife of President Manuel Ávila Camacho, promoted the holiday during the 1940s, resulting in an important state-sponsored celebration. The 1942 celebration lasted a full week and included an announcement that all women could reclaim their pawned sewing machines from the Monte de Piedad at no cost.

Due to Orozco's promotion, the Catholic National Synarchist Union (UNS) took heed of the holiday around 1941. Shop-owner members of the Party of the Mexican Revolution (now the Institutional Revolutionary Party) observed a custom allowing women from humble classes to pick a free Mother's Day gift from a shop to bring home to their families. The Synarchists worried that this promoted both materialism and the idleness of lower classes, and in turn, reinforced the systemic social problems of the country. Currently this holiday practice is viewed as very conservative, but the 1940s UNS saw Mother's Day as part of the larger debate on the modernization that was happening at the time. This economic modernization was inspired by US models and was sponsored by the state. The fact that the holiday was originally imported from the US was seen as evidence of an attempt at imposing capitalism and materialism in Mexican society.

The UNS and the clergy of the city of León interpreted the government's actions as an effort to secularize the holiday and to promote a more active role for women in society. They concluded that the government's long-term goal was to cause women to abandon their traditional roles at home in order to spiritually weaken men. They also saw the holiday as an attempt to secularize the worship of the Virgin Mary, inside a larger effort to dechristianize several holidays. The government sought to counter these claims by organizing widespread masses and asking religious women to assist with the state-sponsored events in order to "depaganize" them. The clergy preferred to promote 2 July celebration of the Santísima Virgen de la Luz, the patron of León, Guanajuato, in replacement of Mother's Day. In 1942, at the same time as Soledad's greatest celebration of Mother's Day, the clergy organized the 210th celebration of the Virgin Mary with a large parade in León.

There is a consensus among scholars that the Mexican government abandoned its revolutionary initiatives during the 1940s, including its efforts to influence Mother's Day.

Today the "Día de las Madres" is an unofficial holiday in Mexico held each year on 10 May, the day on which it was first celebrated in Mexico.

In Mexico, to show affection and appreciation to the mother, it is traditional to start the celebration with the famous song "Las Mañanitas", either a cappella, with the help of a mariachi or a contracted trio. Families usually gather to celebrate, trying to spend as much time as possible with mothers to honor them. They bring some dishes and eat together or visit a restaurant.

==== Myanmar ====
In Myanmar, Mothers' Day (the plural form of mother is used as an official title) is celebrated on the full moon day of Pyatho, the tenth month of the Myanmar calendar, which usually falls in January. At the proposal and initiative of U Thukha, who put a lot of effort into founding this day, it was first celebrated in Mandalay on the full moon day of Pyatho in 1995, but it was officially added to the Myanmar calendar in 1997, two years after its first celebration.

People who are away from home, send postcards or phone their mothers to express love and gratitude and those who live with their mother, give her personal service, like bathing or shampooing, and usually take her to pagodas.

==== Nepal ====
In Nepal, there is a festival equivalent to Mother's Day, called Mata Tirtha Aunsi ("Mother Pilgrimage New Moon"), or Mata Tirtha Puja ("Mother Pilgrimage Worship"). It is celebrated according to the lunar calendar. It falls on the last day of the dark fortnight in the month of Baishakh which falls in April–May (in 2015, it will occur on 18 April). The dark fortnight lasts for 15 days from the full moon to the new moon. This festival is observed to commemorate and honor mothers, and it is celebrated by giving gifts to mothers and remembering mothers who are no more.

To honor mothers who have died, it is the tradition to go on a pilgrimage to the Mata Tirtha ponds, located 6 km to the southwest of downtown Kathmandu. The nearby Mata Tirtha village is named after these ponds. Previously, the tradition was observed primarily by the Newar community and other people living in the Kathmandu Valley. Now this festival is widely celebrated across the country.

Many tragic folklore legends have been created, suggesting different reasons why this pond became a pilgrimage site. The most popular version says that, in ancient times, the mother of a shepherd died, and he made offerings to a nearby pond. There he saw the face of his mother in the water, with her hand taking the offerings. Since then, many people have visited the pond, hoping to see their deceased mother's face. Pilgrims believe that they will bring peace to their mothers' souls by visiting the sacred place. There are two ponds. The larger one is for ritual bathing. The smaller one is used to "look upon mother's face", and is fenced by iron bars to prevent people from bathing in it.

Traditionally, in the Kathmandu valley the South-Western corner is reserved for women and women-related rituals, and the North-Eastern is for men and men-related rituals. The worship place for Mata Tirtha Aunsi is located in Mata Tirtha in the South-Western half of the valley, while the worship place for Gokarna Aunsi, the equivalent celebration for deceased fathers is located in Gokarna, Nepal, in the North-Eastern half. This division is reflected in many aspects of the life in Kathmandu valley.

Mother's Day is known as Aama ko Mukh Herne Din in Nepali, which literally means "day to see mother's face". In Nepal Bhasa, the festival is known as Mām yā Khwā Swayegu, which can be translated as "to look upon mother's face".

==== Netherlands ====
In the Netherlands, Mother's Day was introduced as early as 1910 by the Dutch branch of the Salvation Army. The Royal Dutch Society for Horticulture and Botany, a group protecting the interest of Dutch florists, worked to promote the holiday; they hoped to emulate the commercial success achieved by American florists. They were imitating the campaign already underway by florists in Germany and Austria, but they were aware that the traditions had originated in the US.

Florists launched a major promotional effort in 1925. This included the publication of a book of articles written by famous intellectuals, radio broadcasts, newspapers ads, and the collaboration of priests and teachers who wanted to promote the celebration for their own reasons. In 1931 the second Sunday of May was adopted as the official celebration date. In the mid-1930s the slogan Moederdag – Bloemendag (Mother's Day – Flowers' Day) was coined, and the phrase was popular for many years. In the 1930s and 1940s "Mother's Day cakes" were given as gifts in hospitals and to the Dutch Queen, who is known as the "mother of the country". Other trade groups tried to cash in on the holiday and to give new meaning to the holiday in order to promote their own wares as gifts.

Roman Catholic priests complained that the holiday interfered with the honoring of the Virgin Mary, the divine mother, which took place during the whole month of May. In 1926 Mother's Day was celebrated on 7 July in order to address these complaints. Catholic organizations and priests tried to Christianize the holiday, but those attempts were rendered futile around the 1960s when the church lost influence and the holiday was completely secularized.

In later years, the initial resistance disappeared, and even leftist newspapers stopped their criticism and endorsed Mother's Day.

In the 1980s, the American origin of the holiday was still not widely known, so feminist groups who opposed the perpetuation of gender roles sometimes claimed that Mother's Day was invented by Nazis and celebrated on the birthday of Klara Hitler, Hitler's mother.

==== New Zealand ====
In New Zealand, Mother's Day is celebrated on the second Sunday in May. Mother's Day is not a public holiday. The New Zealand tradition is to send or give cards and gifts, and for children to serve their mothers breakfast in bed.

==== Nicaragua ====
In Nicaragua, the Día de la Madre has been celebrated on 30 May since the early 1940s. The date was chosen by President Anastasio Somoza García because it was the birthday of Casimira Sacasa, his wife's mother.

==== North Korea ====
Mother's Day is celebrated on 16 November as a public holiday in North Korea. The date takes its significance from the First National Meeting of Mothers held in 1961, for which Kim Il Sung, the leader of the country, published a work called The Duty of Mothers in the Education of Children. The date was designated as Mother's Day in May 2012 by the Presidium of the Supreme People's Assembly but only became a public holiday and appeared on the North Korean calendar starting in 2015.

==== Norway ====
Mother's Day was first celebrated on 9 February 1919 and was initially organized by religious institutions. Later it has become a family day, and the mother is often treated to breakfast in bed, flowers and cake.

It has gradually become a major commercial event, with special pastries, flowers and other presents offered by retailers. Day-cares and primary schools often encourage children to make cards and other gifts.

==== Pakistan ====
In Pakistan, Mother's Day is celebrated on the second Sunday of May. Media channels celebrate with special shows. Individuals honor their mothers by giving gifts and commemorative articles. Individuals who have lost their mothers pray and pay their respects to their loved ones lost. Schools hold special programs in order to acknowledge the efforts of their mothers.

==== Panama ====
In Panama, Mother's Day is celebrated on 8 December, the same day as the Feast of the Immaculate Conception. This date was suggested in 1930 by the wife of Panama's President Florencio Harmodio Arosemena. 8 December was adopted as Mother's Day under Law 69, which was passed the same year.

According to another account, in 1924 the Rotary Club of Panama asked that Mother's Day be celebrated on 11 May. Politician Aníbal D. Ríos changed the proposal so that the celebration would be held on 8 December. He then established Mother's Day as a national holiday on that date.

==== Paraguay ====
In Paraguay, Mother's Day is celebrated on 15 May, the same day as the Dia de la Patria, which celebrates the independence of Paraguay. This date was chosen to honor the role played by Juana María de Lara in the events of 14 May 1811 that led to Paraguay's independence.

In 2008, the Paraguayan Minister of Culture, Bruno Barrios, lamented this coincidence because, in Paraguay, Mother's Day is much more popular than independence day and the independence celebration goes unnoticed. As a result, Barrios asked that the celebration be moved to the end of the month. A group of young people attempted to gather 20,000 signatures to ask the Parliament to move Mother's Day. In 2008, the Comisión de festejos (Celebration Committee) of the city of Asunción asked that Mother's Day be moved to the second Sunday of May.

==== Philippines ====
In the Philippines, Mother's Day is officially celebrated on the second Sunday of May, but it is not a public holiday. Although not a traditional Filipino holiday, the occasion owes its popularity to American Colonial Period influence.

According to a 2008 article by the Philippine News Agency, in 1921 the Ilocos Norte Federation of Women's Clubs asked to declare the first Monday of December as Mother's Day "to honor these fabulous women who brought forth God's children into this world." In response, Governor-General Charles Yeater issued Circular No. 33 declaring the celebration. In 1937 President Manuel L. Quezon issued Presidential Proclamation No. 213, changing the name of the occasion from "Mother's Day" to "Parent's Day" to address the complaints that there wasn't a "Father's Day". In 1980 President Ferdinand Marcos issued Presidential Proclamation No. 2037 proclaiming the date as both Mother's Day and Father's Day. In 1988 President Corazon Aquino issued Presidential Proclamation No. 266, changing Mother's Day to the second Sunday of May, and Father's Day to the third Sunday of June, discontinuing the traditional date. In 1998 President Joseph Estrada returned both celebrations to the first Monday of December.

==== Poland ====
In Poland Mother's Day is celebrated May 26.

==== Portugal ====
In Portugal, the "Dia da Mãe" ("Mother's Day") is an unofficial holiday held each year on the first Sunday of May (sometimes coinciding with Labour Day). In the weeks leading up to this Sunday, school children spend a few hours a day preparing a gift for their mothers, aided by their school teachers. In general, mothers receive gifts from their family members and this day is meant to be celebrated with the whole family. It used to be celebrated on 8 December, the same date as the Conception of the Virgin celebration.

==== Romania ====
In Romania, Mother's Day has been celebrated on the first Sunday of May since 2010. Law 319/2009 made both Mother's Day and Father's Day official holidays in Romania. The measure was passed thanks to campaign efforts from the Alliance Fighting Discrimination Against Fathers (TATA). Previously, Mother's Day was celebrated on 8 March, as part of International Women's Day (a tradition dating back to when Romania was part of the Eastern bloc). Today, Mother's Day and International Women's Day are two separate holidays, with International Women's Day being held on its original date of 8 March.

==== Russia ====
Traditionally Russia had celebrated International Women's Day and Mother's Day on 8 March, an inheritance from the Soviet Union, and a public holiday.

Women's Day was first celebrated on the last Sunday in February in 1913 in Russia.

In 1917, demonstrations marking International Women's Day in Saint Petersburg on the last Sunday in February (which fell on 8 March on the Gregorian calendar) initiated the February Revolution. Following the October Revolution later that year, the Bolshevik Alexandra Kollontai persuaded Vladimir Lenin to make it an official holiday in the Soviet Union, and it was established, but was a working day until 1965.

On 8 May 1965, by the decree of the Presidium of the Supreme Soviet, International Women's Day was declared a non-working day in the Soviet Union "in commemoration of the outstanding merits of Soviet women in communistic construction, in the defense of their Fatherland during the Great Patriotic War, in their heroism and selflessness at the front and in the rear, and also marking the great contribution of women to strengthening friendship between peoples, and the struggle for peace. But still, women's day must be celebrated as are other holidays."

==== Samoa ====
In Samoa, Mother's Day is celebrated on the second Sunday in May, and as a recognised national holiday on the Monday following.

==== Singapore ====
In Singapore, Mother's Day is celebrated on the second Sunday of May. It is not recognized as a holiday by the government.

==== Slovakia ====
Czechoslovakia celebrated only Women's Day until the Velvet Revolution in 1989. After the country split in 1993, Slovakia started celebrating both Women's Day and Mother's Day. The politicization of Women's Day has affected the official status of Mother's Day. Center-right parties want Mother's Day to replace Women's Day, and social-democrats want to make Women's Day an official holiday. Currently, both days are festive, but they are not "state holidays". In the Slovak Republic, Mother's Day is celebrated every second Sunday in May.

==== South Africa ====
In South Africa, Mother's Day is celebrated on the second Sunday of May. It is not recognized as a holiday by the government. The tradition is to give cards and gifts and to serve mothers breakfast in bed or to go out to lunch together as a family.

==== South Korea ====
In South Korea, Parents' Day (어버이날, Eobeoinal) is celebrated annually on May 8. Unlike Mother's Day, which is focused solely on mothers, Parents' Day honors both mothers and fathers. The holiday was established as an official national observance in 1973, replacing the separate celebrations of Mother's Day and Father's Day that had been observed earlier. Typical customs include giving carnations, writing letters, and spending time with one's parents.

==== South Sudan ====
In South Sudan, Mother's Day is celebrated on the first Monday in July. President Salva Kiir proclaimed Mother's Day as the first Monday in July after handing over from Sudan. Children in South Sudan are presenting mothers with gifts and flowers. The first Mother's Day was held in that country on 2 July 2012.

==== Spain ====
In Spain, Mother's Day or Día de la Madre is celebrated on the first Sunday of May. The weeks leading up to this Sunday, school children spend a few hours a day preparing a gift for their mothers, aided by their school teachers. In general, mothers receive gifts from their family members & this day is meant to be celebrated with the whole family. It is also said to be celebrated in May, as May is the month dedicated to the Virgin Mary (mother of Jesus) according to Catholicism. The idea of a month dedicated specifically to Mary can be traced back to baroque times. Although it wasn't always held during May, Mary Month included thirty daily spiritual exercises honoring Mary.

In 1925 the Valencian poet Julio Menéndez García published a Hymn to Mother in a pamphlet in which he proposed the celebration of Mother's Day in all Spanish-speaking countries. The official declaration was never produced, but at that time the initiative was adopted at a local level on different dates; thus, for example, in Madrid, Mother's Day was celebrated on 4 October 1926.

In 1939 the Youth Front of FET y de las JONS party, promoted the celebration of Mother's Day coinciding with the feast of the Immaculate Conception, on 8 December.

In the early 1960s, on the initiative of a chain of department stores (Galerías Preciados), which copied the custom established in Cuba, Mother's Day was also celebrated on the first Sunday of May (El Corte Inglés, the great competitor of Galerías Preciados, celebrated the holiday in December). The two dates, May and December, coexisted until 1965 when the ecclesiastical authorities chose to celebrate the festival in May, within the month consecrated to the Virgin, to recover the authentic character of the Day of the Immaculate Conception.

==== Sri Lanka ====
In Sri Lanka, Mother's Day is celebrated on the second Sunday of May.

==== Sweden ====
In Sweden, Mother's Day was first celebrated in 1919, by an initiative of the author Cecilia Bååth-Holmberg. It took several decades for the day to be widely recognized. Swedes born in the early nineteen hundreds typically did not celebrate the day because of the common belief that the holiday was invented strictly for commercial purposes. This was in contrast to Father's Day, which has been widely celebrated in Sweden since the late 1970s. Mother's Day in Sweden is celebrated on the last Sunday in May. A later date was chosen to allow everyone to go outside and pick flowers.

==== Switzerland ====
In Switzerland, the "règle de Pentecôte" law allows Mother's Day to be celebrated a week late if the holiday falls on the same day as Pentecost. In 2008, merchants declined to move the date.

==== Taiwan ====
In Taiwan, Mother's Day is celebrated on the second Sunday of the month of May, coinciding with Buddha's Birthday and the traditional ceremony of "washing the Buddha". In 1999 the Taiwanese government established the second Sunday of May as Buddha's Birthday, so they would be celebrated in the same day.

Since 2006, the Tzu Chi, the largest charity organization in Taiwan, celebrates the Tzu Chi Day, Mother's Day and Buddha's Birthday all together, as part of a unified celebration and religious observance.

==== Thailand ====
Mother's day in Thailand is celebrated on the birthday of the Queen Mother of Thailand, Sirikit (12 August). The holiday was first celebrated around the 1980s as part of the campaign by the Prime Minister of Thailand Prem Tinsulanonda to promote Thailand's Royal family. Father's Day is celebrated on the late King Bhumibol Adulyadej's birthday.

==== Ukraine ====
Ukraine celebrates Mother's Day (Ukrainian: День Матері) on the second Sunday of May. In Ukraine, Mother's Day officially became a holiday in 1999 and has been celebrated since 2000. Ukrainian society also celebrates International Women's Day, a holiday adopted under the Soviet Union that remained a tradition in Ukraine after its collapse.

==== United Kingdom ====
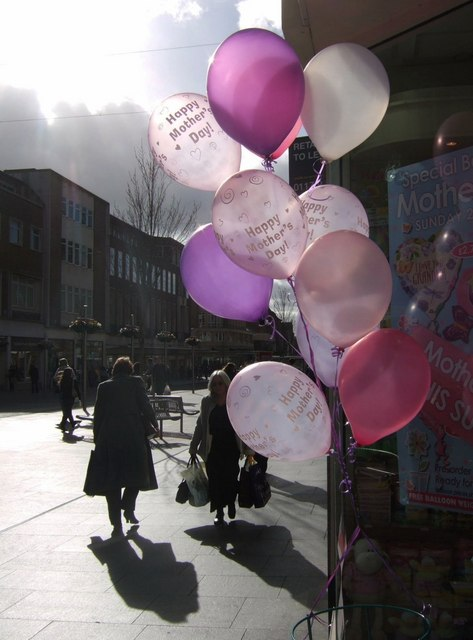
Balloons outside, in the week before Mother's Day 2008

The United Kingdom celebrates Mother's Day on the Fourth Sunday in Lent (15 March 2026). In the United Kingdom, the holiday has its roots in the religious Mothering Sunday celebration and was originally unrelated to the international Mother's Day holiday. Most historians believe that Mothering Sunday evolved from a medieval practice of visiting one's mother church annually on Laetare Sunday.

==== United States ====
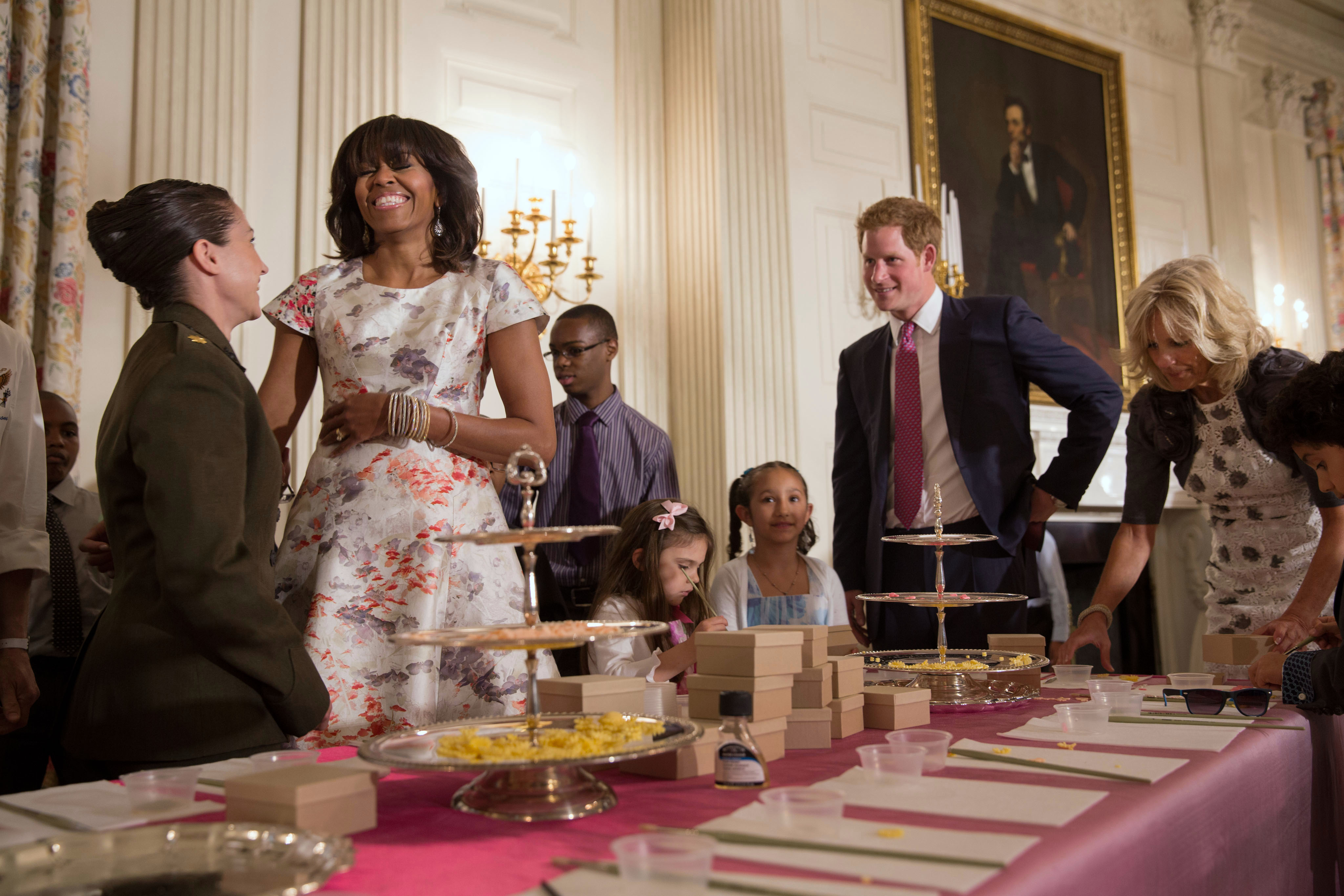
Prince Harry, Michelle Obama and Jill Biden helping children create Mother's Day cards at the White House, 9 May 2013

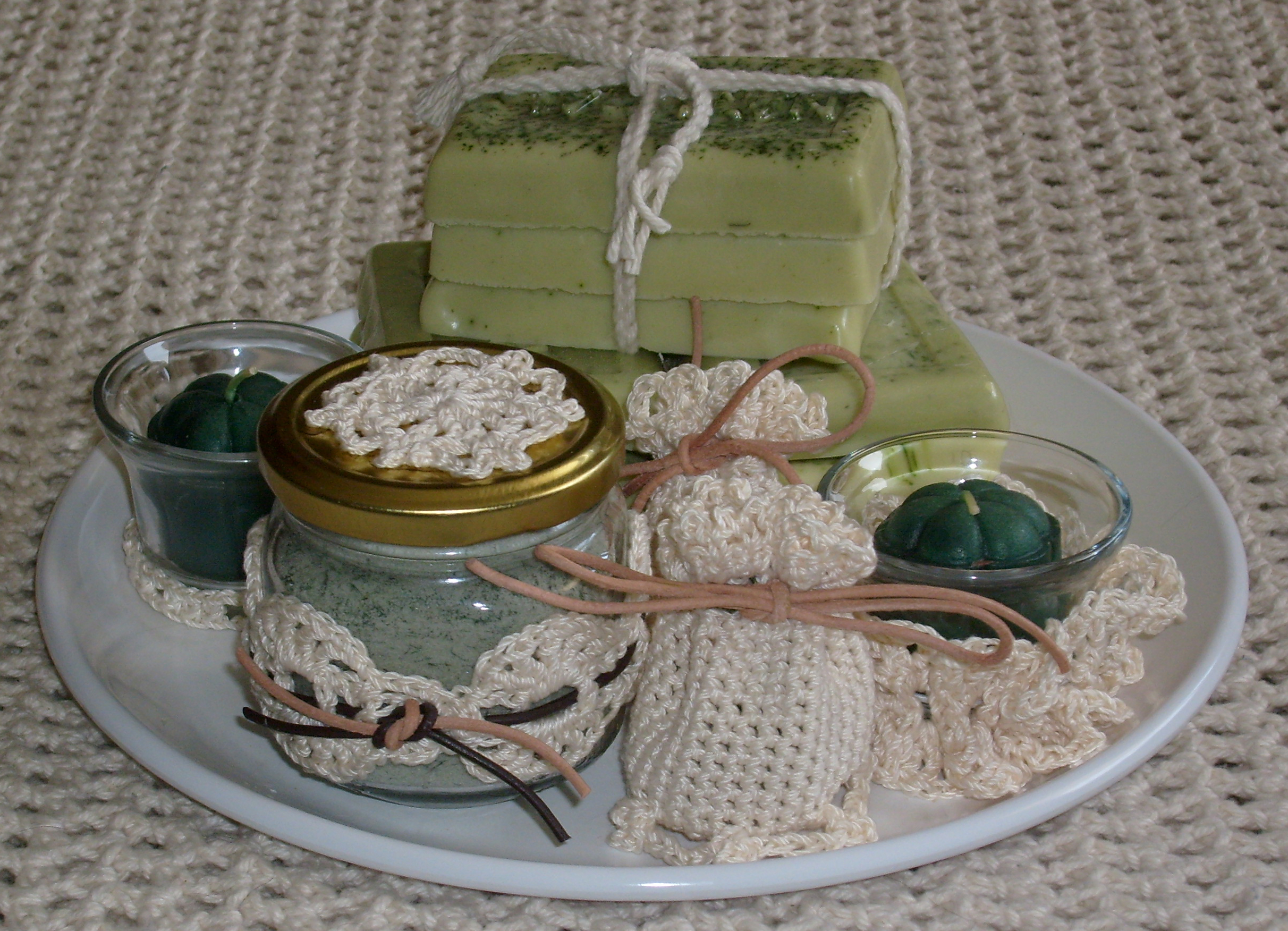
Handmade Mother's Day gifts

The United States celebrates Mother's Day on the second Sunday in May. In 1872 Julia Ward Howe called for women to join in support of disarmament and asked for 2 June 1872, to be established as a "Mother's Day for Peace". Her 1870 "Appeal to womanhood throughout the world" is sometimes referred to as Mother's Day Proclamation. But Howe's day was not for honouring mothers but for organizing pacifist mothers against war. In the 1880s and 1890s there were several further attempts to establish an American "Mother's Day", but these did not succeed beyond the local level.

In the United States, Mother's Day remains one of the biggest days for sales of flowers, greeting cards, and the like; Mother's Day is also the biggest holiday for dining out and for long-distance telephone calls. Moreover, churchgoing is also popular on Mother's Day, yielding the highest church attendance after Christmas Eve and Easter. Many worshippers celebrate the day with carnations, coloured if the mother is living and white if she is dead.

It is possible that the holiday would have withered over time without the support and continuous promotion of the florist industry. Other holidays from the same time, such as Children's Day and Temperance Sunday, do not have the same level of popularity.

== See also ==
- International Mother's Day Shrine
- International Women's Day
- Father's Day
- List of films set around Mother's Day
- May devotions to the Blessed Virgin Mary
- Why Mom Deserves a Diamond contest

== Notes ==
=== Citations ===
Enstam, Elizabeth York. "The Dallas equal suffrage association, political style, and popular culture: grassroots strategies of the Woman Suffrage Movement, 1913–1919." Journal of Southern History 68.4 (2002):817+. Student Resources in Context. Web. 14 November 2014.
