= Father–Daughter Day =

Holiday recognized annually in October in the US

- Observed by: United States
- Type: National
- Significance: Honoring relationships of fathers and daughters
- Date: Second Sunday in October
- 2024 date: October 13
- 2025 date: October 12
- 2026 date: October 11
- 2027 date: October 10
- Frequency: Annual
- First time: 2017
- Related to: In history and celebrations: Father's Day, Mother's Day, Parents' Day, National Grandparents Day, Siblings Day

Father–Daughter Day (sometimes called National Father–Daughter Day) is a holiday recognized annually on the second Sunday of October in the United States, honoring the relationship between a father and a daughter. Unlike Mother's Day and Father's Day, it is not federally recognized.

== History ==
The U.S. holiday was contrived by Adam Lowenberg, a music-industry executive with ownership rights to the song "My Girl", and pitched to Smokey Robinson, who positioned the holiday as honoring his relationship with his only daughter. In human development the relationship between fathers and sons overshadows the bond with daughters. This holiday promotes the development of young women through their father.

Robinson stated: “There are many different kinds of families today, and we know that all parental relationships are important to the healthy development of children, but the father/daughter bond is unique and one that is near to my heart. The father/daughter relationship shapes a young woman’s perspective of men and what to expect from them. I believe that female empowerment begins in the home and fathers must set a healthy example through their personal actions and interactions.”

=== Celebration ===
Examples of commemoration during Father–Daughter Day can be both commercial or intangible. Nonmaterial examples of observances during this day include embracing one another with hugs, spending quality time together, and honoring their presence in your life.

In September 2017, Rockabye Baby! Music released a lullaby version of Smokey Robinson's "My Girl" to support the holiday. In October 2017, greeting card company American Greetings announced their plan to release a line of eCards with Smokey Robinson to celebrate the launch of Father-Daughter Day.

== See also ==
- American Greetings
