= Caperton, West Virginia =

Unincorporated community in West Virginia, United States

- Unincorporated community
- Location within West Virginia Location within the United States
- Coordinates: 38°1′16″N 81°1′35″W
- Country: United States
- State: West Virginia
- County: Fayette
- Elevation: 991 ft (302 m)
- Time zone: UTC-5 (Eastern (EST))
  - Summer (DST): UTC-4 (EDT)
- GNIS ID: 1554066

Caperton is an unincorporated community and coal town in Fayette County, West Virginia, United States. It was also known as Elen.

Caperton was founded in 1880 by Joseph L. Beury, John Cooper, and George H. Caperton, the town's namesake. The community has the name of Austin Caperton, a businessman in the local mining industry.

== Notable people ==
- J. Roy Hunt, cinematographer
- Marian McQuade, National Grandparent's Day founder

== See also ==
- List of ghost towns in West Virginia
