= Father's Day (United States) =

US holiday honoring fathers

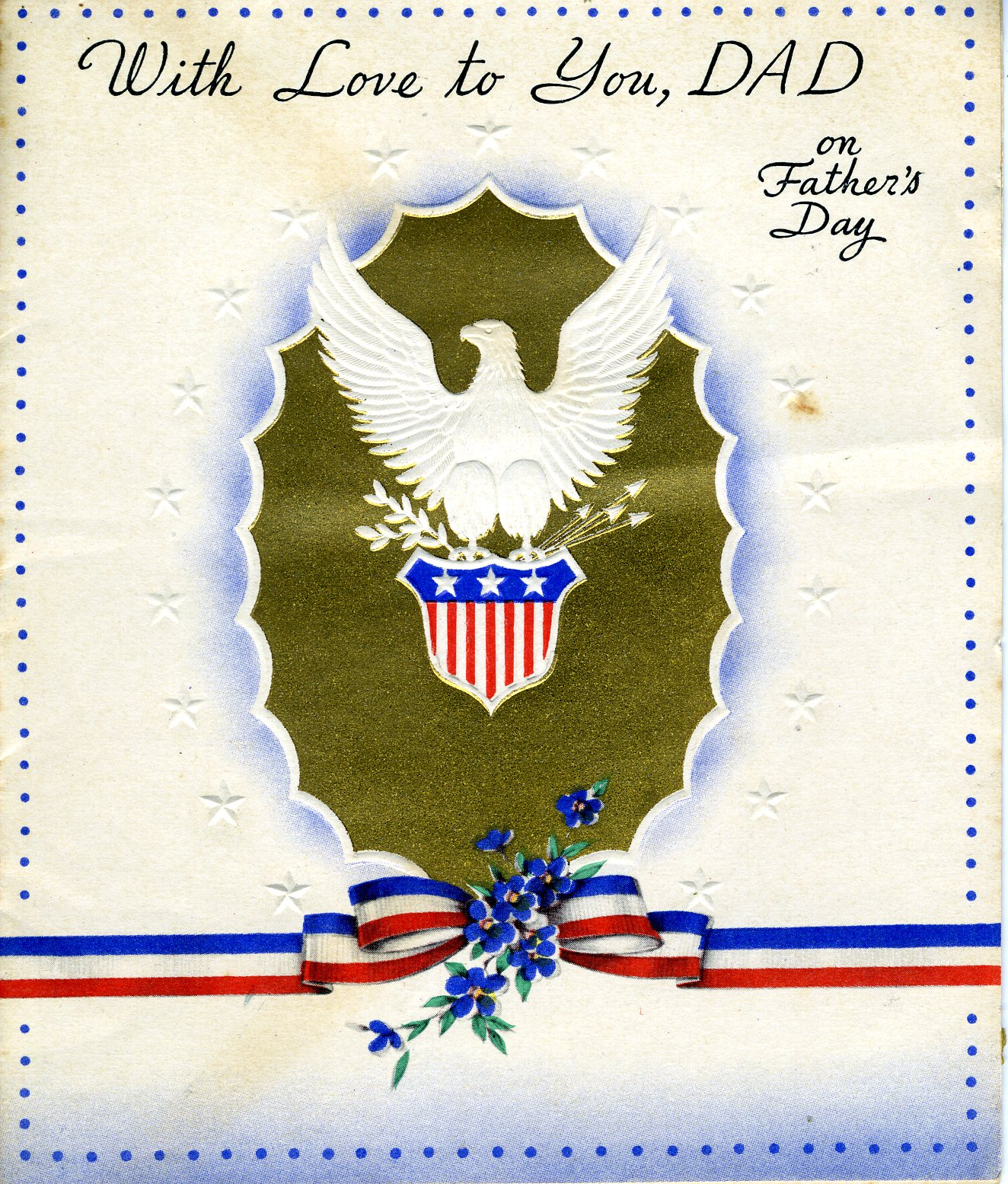
- An American Father's Day card
- Observed by: United States
- Type: US Culture
- Significance: Honors fathers and fatherhood
- Date: Third Sunday in June
- 2025 date: June 15
- 2026 date: June 21
- 2027 date: June 20
- 2028 date: June 18
- Frequency: Annual
- Related to: Mother's Day

Father's Day is an annual holiday honoring people's fathers and celebrating fatherhood, paternal bonds, and the influence of fathers in society. It was first proposed by Sonora Smart Dodd of Spokane, Washington, in 1909. It is currently celebrated in the United States annually on the third Sunday in June.

== History ==
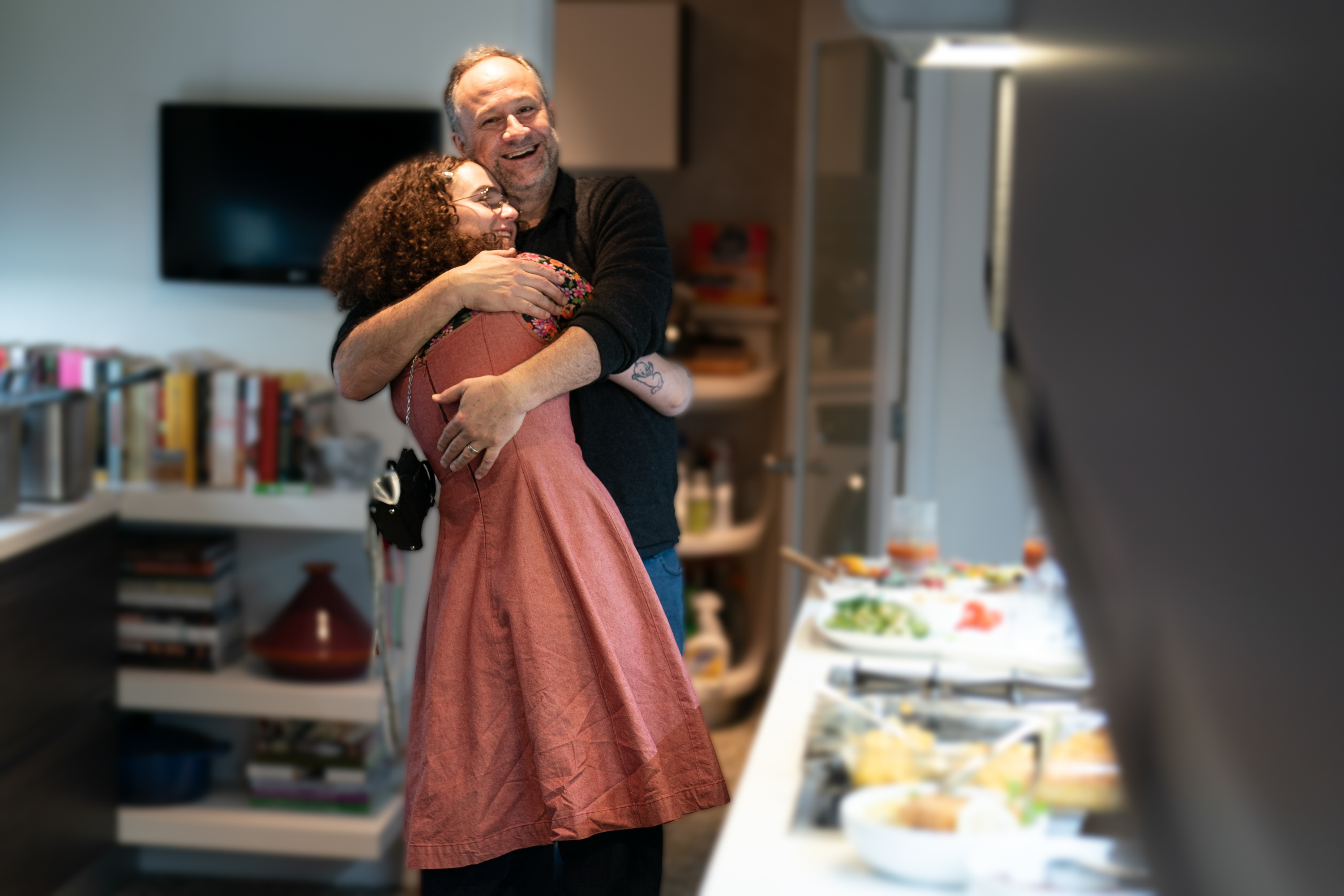
United States second gentleman Doug Emhoff celebrating Father's Day with his daughter Ella Emhoff in 2024

Father's Day was inaugurated in the United States in the early 20th century to complement Mother's Day in celebrating fathers, fathering, and fatherhood.

Father's Day was founded in Spokane, Washington, at the YMCA in 1910 by Sonora Smart Dodd, who was born in Arkansas. Its first celebration was in the Spokane YMCA on June 19, 1910. Her father, the Civil War veteran William Jackson Smart, was a single parent who raised his six children there. After hearing a sermon about Anna Jarvis' Mother's Day at Central Methodist Episcopal Church in 1909, she told her pastor that fathers should have a similar holiday honoring them. Although she initially suggested June 5, her father's birthday, the pastors of the Spokane Ministerial Alliance did not have enough time to prepare their sermons, and the celebration was deferred to the third Sunday of June.

It did not have much success initially. In the 1920s, Dodd stopped promoting the celebration because she was studying at the Art Institute of Chicago, and it faded into relative obscurity, even in Spokane. In the 1930s, Dodd returned to Spokane and started promoting the celebration again, raising its awareness at a national level. She had the help of those trade groups that would benefit most from the holiday, for example the manufacturers of ties, tobacco pipes, and any traditional presents to fathers. Since 1938, she had the help of the Father's Day Council, founded by the New York Associated Men's Wear Retailers to consolidate and systematize the commercial promotion. Americans resisted the holiday at first, perceiving it as just an attempt by merchants to replicate the commercial success of Mother's Day, and newspapers frequently featured cynical and sarcastic attacks and jokes. But the trade groups did not give up: they kept promoting it and even incorporated the jokes into their adverts, and they eventually succeeded. By the mid-1980s, the Father's Council wrote that "(...) [Father's Day] has become a Second Christmas for all the men's gift-oriented industries."

A bill to accord national recognition of the holiday was introduced in Congress in 1913. In 1916, President Woodrow Wilson went to Spokane to speak at a Father's Day celebration and wanted to make it official, but Congress resisted, fearing that it would become commercialized. US President Calvin Coolidge recommended in 1924 that the day be observed by the nation but stopped short of issuing a national proclamation. Two earlier attempts to formally recognize the holiday had been defeated by Congress. In 1957, Maine Senator Margaret Chase Smith wrote a proposal accusing Congress of ignoring fathers for 40 years while honoring mothers, thus "[singling] out just one of our two parents". In 1966, President Lyndon B. Johnson issued the first presidential proclamation honoring fathers, designating the third Sunday in June as Father's Day. Six years later, the day was made a permanent national holiday when President Richard Nixon signed it into law on April 24, 1972.

Many other countries celebrate a Father's Day, for example at Saint Joseph's Day or in June. International Men's Day is celebrated in many countries on November 19 for men and boys who are not fathers.

A "Father's Day" service was held on July 5, 1908, in Fairmont, West Virginia, in the Williams Memorial Methodist Episcopal Church South, now known as Central United Methodist Church. Grace Golden Clayton was mourning the loss of her father who died on December 6, 1907, when the Monongah mining disaster in nearby Monongah killed 361 men, 250 of them fathers, leaving around a thousand fatherless children. Clayton suggested to her pastor, Robert Thomas Webb, that he should honor all those fathers. Clayton chose the Sunday nearest to the birthday of her father, Methodist minister Fletcher Golden.

Clayton's event did not have repercussions outside of Fairmont for several reasons, among them: the city was overwhelmed by other events, the celebration was never promoted outside of the town itself and no proclamation was made in the City Council. Also two events overshadowed this event: the celebration of Independence Day July 4, 1908, with 12,000 attendees and several shows including a hot air balloon event, which took over the headlines in the following days, and the death of a 16-year-old girl on July 4. The local church and Council were overwhelmed and they did not even think of promoting the event, and it was not celebrated again for many years. The original sermon was not reproduced in the press, and it was lost. Finally, Clayton was a quiet person, who never promoted the event or even talked to other persons about it.

Clayton also may have been inspired by Anna Jarvis' crusade to establish Mother's Day; two months prior, Jarvis had held a celebration for her dead mother in Grafton, West Virginia, a town about 15 miles (24 km) away from Fairmont.

In 1911, Jane Addams proposed a citywide Father's Day in Chicago, but she was turned down.

In 1912, there was a Father's Day celebration in Vancouver, Washington, suggested by Methodist pastor J. J. Berringer of the Irvingtom Methodist Church. They believed mistakenly that they had been the first to celebrate such a day. They followed a 1911 suggestion by the Portland Oregonian.

Harry C. Meek, member of Lions Clubs International, claimed that he had the first idea for Father's Day in 1915. Meek claimed that the third Sunday of June was chosen because it was his birthday (it would have been more natural to choose his father's birthday). The Lions Club has named him "Originator of Father's Day". Meek made many efforts to promote Father's Day and make it an official holiday.

== Spelling ==
In the United States, Dodd used the "Fathers' Day" spelling on her original petition for the holiday, indicating a plural "fathers". But the spelling "Father's Day" (singular "father") was already used in 1913 when a bill was introduced to the U.S. Congress as the first attempt to establish the holiday, and it was still spelled the same way when its creator was commended in 2008 by the U.S. Congress.

== See also ==
- List of films set around Father's Day
