= Grace Golden Clayton =

First person to suggest Father's Day

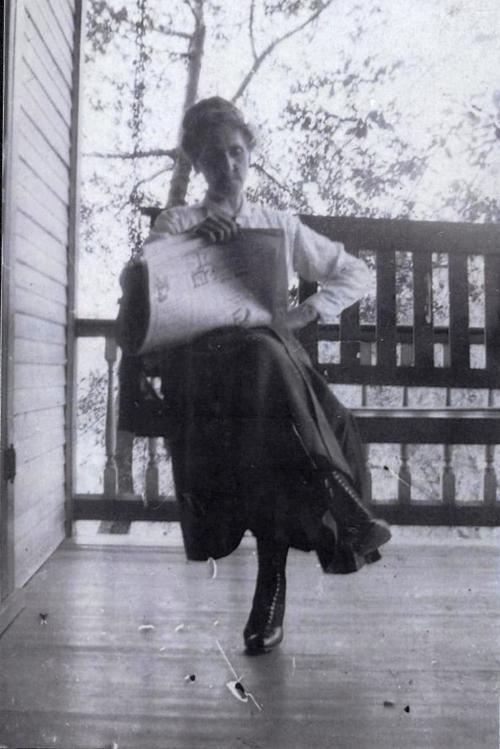
- Born: October 4, 1875; Barboursville, West Virginia, U.S.
- Died: March 29, 1958 (aged 82); Belleville, West Virginia, U.S.
- Known for: Father's Day
- Spouse: Charles Little Clayton

Grace Golden Clayton (October 4, 1875 - March 29, 1958) has been credited as the first person to suggest a one-time memorial for fathers, which is believed to be the first recorded occasion celebrating Father's Day.

== Father's day service ==
When the 1907 Monongah, West Virginia coal mining disaster occurred on December 6, 1907, killing 361 men, 250 of them fathers, Clayton suggested to her local pastor of the Williams Methodist Episcopal Church South in Fairmont, West Virginia, Reverend Robert T. Webb, that a commemoration service be held in their honor.

"It was partly the explosion that set me to think how important and loved most fathers are," Clayton said in an interview with The Fairmont Times on September 23, 1979. "All those lonely children and the heart-broken wives and mothers, made orphans and widows in a matter of a few minutes. Oh, how sad and frightening to have no father, no husband, to turn to at such a sad time."

A memorial service was held on July 5, 1908; a date which Clayton herself chose since it was the Sunday closest to her own father's birthday. Although the remembrance recognized Clayton's father and the 1,000 children's fathers, the event was local and did not gain national attention. Reasons for this have been cited on claims that two other large gatherings had happened around the same time: a July 4 celebration the day before, which gathered some 12,000 people to the city, and the death of a well known daughter of parishioners to the church. The combination of extreme jubilation and intense sadness may have directed attention away from the planned Father's day remembrance service. On account of this, no one felt it necessary to approach the city and request a proclamation instituting an official Father's Day.

In the following years, many people attempted to officiate a national Father's Day elsewhere, but it wasn't until 1972 when Richard Nixon signed into law a bill proclaiming it a national observance. Ten years earlier on August 10, 1962, however, an attendee to the Clayton-Webb memorial service by the name of Ward Downs wrote a letter to then United States House of Representative Arch Moore stating:

"It has recently come to my attention of a movement establishing a Father's Day by an act of Congress to be observed the same as Mother's Day. It was my privilege to have attended the first Father's Day Service July 5, 1908 at the Williams Memorial M.E. Church, South, now the Central United Methodist Church, Fairmont, WV. The sermon was preached by Dr. R.T. Webb at the request of Mrs. Charles Clayton, a member of that congregation, and daughter of a Methodist minister. I recall the occasion very distinctly as the pulpit was decorated by having ripened sheaves of wheat placed about it. Many favorable comments by the individuals and the press were made concerning the service at that time. Any assistance you can give this movement will be very much appreciated by me and all the Methodists in this part of the country."

== Personal life ==
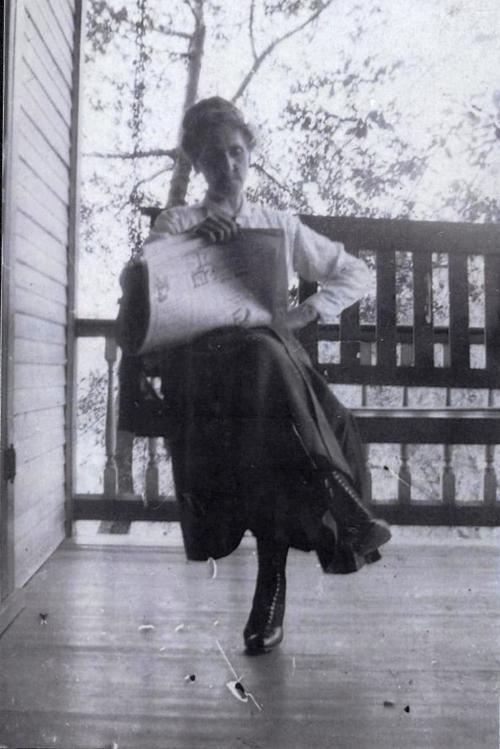
Grace Golden Clayton sitting on her Spring Street porch in Fairmont

Grace Golden Clayton was born in Barboursville, West Virginia to Rev. Martin Fletcher Golden and Maria L Scott Golden. She was the youngest of eight children. Clayton's father was a traveling minister, serving the Marion Circuit throughout 1878; before being appointed elder of the Methodist Episcopal Church South in the Fayette District. In 1885, Rev. Golden served as Presiding Elder in Prestonburg, Kentucky until his death in May 1890.

Clayton married Charles Little "Charley" Clayton (September 8, 1897 - October 10, 1934). They had four children: Carol Jennings Clayton, Robert Lewis Clayton, Joseph Edwin Clayton, Carroll Clayton. The Fairmont Times reported that a church in the area of Stafford, completed in 1896, employed an organist named Mrs. Grace Clayton. Grace Golden Clayton died on March 29, 1958, in Belleville, West Virginia at age 82.

== Legacy ==
Many years later, the city of Fairmont in Marion County, West Virginia erected approaching state signs that read: "Welcome to Fairmont the friendly city - Home of the first Father's Day Service July 5, 1908"; while the State of West Virginia itself signed governor resolutions giving Clayton proper credit for having founded Father's Day. Today, a commemoration plaque hangs outside the Central United Methodist Church in Fairmont, West Virginia (former site of the Williams Methodist Episcopal Church South) that reads: "First Father's Day Service."

== See also ==
- Father's Day
- Sonora Smart Dodd
