= Parents' Day =

One of several holidays dedicated to parents

- Date: Varies by country
- Frequency: Annual
- Related to: Mother's Day; Father's Day; Grandparents' Day; Children's Day; Siblings Day

Parents' Day is observed in South Korea on May 8 and in the United States on the fourth Sunday of July. The South Korean designation was established in 1973, replacing the Mother's Day previously marked on May 8, and includes public and private celebrations. The United States day was created in 1994 under President Bill Clinton. June 1 has also been proclaimed as "Global Day of Parents" by the United Nations as a mark of appreciation for the commitment of parents towards their children. In the Philippines, while it is not strictly observed or celebrated, the first Monday of December each year is proclaimed as Parents' Day.

== International ==
The United Nations proclaimed June 1 to be the Global Day of Parents "to appreciate all parents in all parts of the world for their selfless commitment to children and their lifelong sacrifice towards nurturing this relationship".

== In the United States ==
Parents' Day
- Observed by: United States
- Type: Federal observance
- Date: Fourth Sunday in July
- 2025 date: July 27
- 2026 date: July 26
- 2027 date: July 25
- 2028 date: July 23
- Frequency: Annual
- Related to: Mother's Day; Father's Day

In the United States, Parents' Day is held on the fourth Sunday of July. This was established in 1994 when President Bill Clinton signed a Congressional Resolution into law (36 U.S.C. § 135) for "recognizing, uplifting, and supporting the role of parents in the rearing of children." The bill was introduced by Republican Senator Trent Lott. It was supported by members of the Unification Church which also celebrates a holiday called Parents' Day, although on a different date. Parents' Day is celebrated throughout the United States.

== In South Korea ==
Parents' Day
- Observed by: South Korea
- Type: National
- Date: May 8

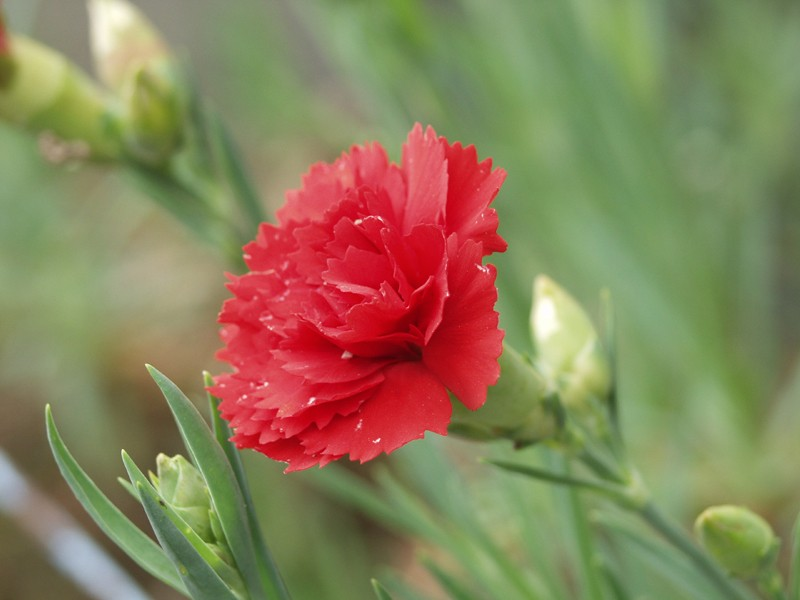
Dianthus caryophyllus, commonly known as carnations, flowers that symbolize Parents' Day and are given to parents by children in celebrating Parents' Day in South Korea

In South Korea, Parents' Day (Korean: 어버이날 Eobeoinal) is annually held on May 8. Parents' Day is celebrated by both the public and the government. Family events focus on the parents; popular actions include giving parents carnations. The ceremony to designate Parents' Day as an anniversary and to wear carnations originated in Christian culture in the United States. Western religion, culture, and Confucian ideas combined to make it a traditional holiday. Public events are led by the Ministry of Health and Welfare and include public celebrations and awards.

The origins of Parents' Day can be traced back to the 1930s. Starting in 1930, some Christian communities began to celebrate Mother's Day or Parents' Day. This tradition was combined with Korea's traditional Confucianism culture to eventually establish Mother's Day. In 1956, the State Council of South Korea designated May 8 as an annual Mother's Day. However, the question of Father's Day was discussed and on March 30, 1973, May 8 was designated as Parents' Day under Presidential Decree 6615, or the Regulations Concerning Various Holidays (각종 기념일 등에 관한 규정). When Parents' Day was first established, the entire week with the 8th day was designated to be a week to respect the elderly, but respecting elders in the month of May was abolished in 1997 with October becoming the month designated for respecting the elderly.

== In the Philippines ==
Mothers' Day is traditionally celebrated on the first Monday of December. On this day, children placed pink cadena de amor on their chest. Children who no longer have mothers place white cadena de amor.

In 1921, Circular No. 33 designating the first Monday every December as Mothers' day was issued, as a response to the appeal Ilocos Norte Federation of Woman's Clubs. During the Philippine Commonwealth Government, then President Quezon issued Proclamation No. 213, s. 1937 declaring the day designated as Mothers' Day as Parents' Day. This was due to finding petitions to set a special date for Fathers’ Day not advisable as there are already set of numerous holidays set, and deeming it more fitting to celebrate both Mothers' and Fathers' Day together and not apart. In 1980, a proclamation was issued declaring first Sunday and the first Monday of December as Father's Day and Mother's Day respectively. In 1988, the issued presidential proclamation followed the international day of celebration of Father's and Mother's Day which most Filipinos are familiar with. However, then President Estrada tried to revive the tradition through Proclamation No. 58, s. 1998.

== In the Democratic Republic of the Congo ==
Parents' Day (Siku ya Wazazi)
- Observed by: Democratic Republic of the Congo
- Type: National
- Date: August 1
- Related to: Parents and Ancestors

In the Democratic Republic of the Congo, Parents’ Day, also called Siku ya Wazazi in Swahili, is one of the public holidays especially celebrated on August 1 each year. This day is devoted to honor the role played by mothers and fathers in the Congolese society and the significance of the family unit. The origin of this celebration is attributed to Mobutu in 1979 who decided to replace All Saints' Day, a vestige of the colonial era, with this holiday now dedicated to parents and ancestors in general. Early in the morning, people go to clean up the cemeteries in remembrance of the deceased relatives before giving cards and gifts to their parents. This accentuates the traditional roles of parents, which is to look after and provide for the family as numerous as it may be. Culturally, parents are not only the individual that gave you birth and brought you up to face this challenging world. They are all those who placed the building blocks of your life.

== In India ==
In India, Parents' Worship Day is celebrated on 14 February.

== See also ==
- Father's Day
- Mother's Day
- Grandparents Day
- Public holidays in the United States
- Public holidays in South Korea
- List of International observances
