= Siblings Day =

Holiday honouring relationships of siblings

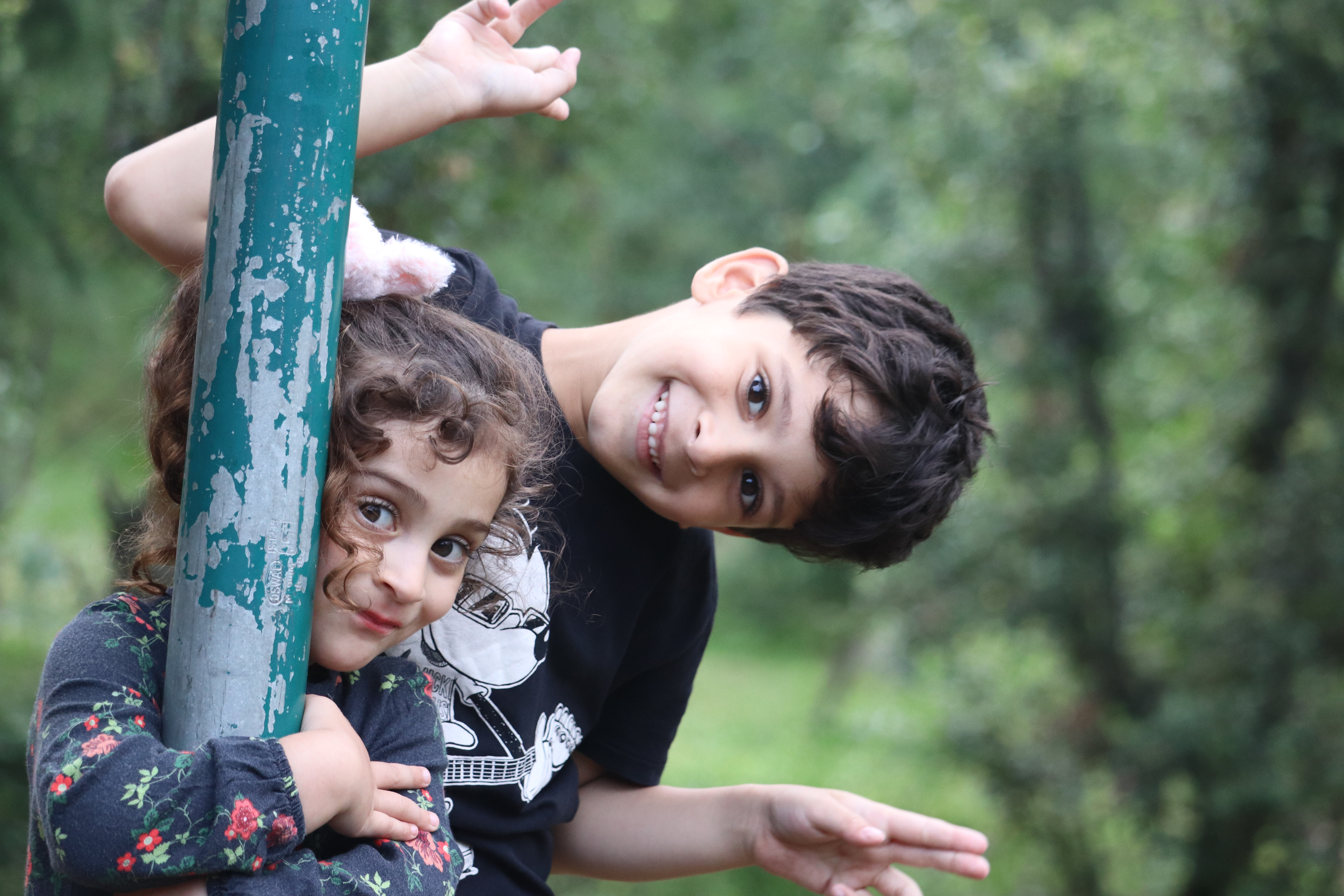
- A brother and sister smiling together
- Observed by: Several countries, originally United States
- Significance: Honouring relationships of siblings
- Date: April 10
- Next time: April 10, 2027
- Frequency: Annual
- Related to: In honorees: Raksha Bandhan; In history and celebrations: Children's Day, Father's Day, Mother's Day, Parents' Day

Brothers and Sisters Day
- Observed by: Several countries, namely the United States, France, Portugal, Spain
- Significance: Honoring bonds and relationships of siblings
- Date: May 31
- Next time: May 31, 2027
- Frequency: Annual
- First time: 1995
- Started by: Claudia Evart
- Related to: In honorees: In history and celebrations: Children's Day, Father's Day, Mother's Day, Parents' Day, National Grandparents Day

Siblings Day is a holiday recognized in parts of the United States and Canada on April 10, and as Brothers and Sisters Day on May 31 in Europe. It honours the relationship of siblings of all ages. Unlike Mother's Day and Father's Day, it is not federally recognized in the United States, though the Siblings Day Foundation is working to change this. Since 1998, the governors of 49 states have officially issued proclamations to recognize Siblings Day in their state.

Siblings Day is also celebrated in India. The Hindu holiday of Raksha Bandhan, which is the oldest festival in this category, also celebrates the bond of brothers and sisters.

== History ==
Claudia Evart, a native New Yorker and resident of New York City, founded the Siblings Day Foundation (SDF) as a tax-exempt organization. Inspired by the loss of her siblings Alan (age 36) and Lisette (age 19) at a young age, she created the SDF with the aim of establishing a National Siblings Day to be celebrated annually on April 10, Lisette's birthday. The foundation achieved non-profit status in 1999.

Carolyn Maloney, then the U.S. representative for New York's 14th congressional district, officially saluted the holiday and introduced it into the official Congressional Record of the United States Congress on April 10, 1997; and in subsequent years 2001, 2005 and 2008.

The foundation has received formal recognition from three American presidents. Presidents Clinton, Bush, and Obama each signing Presidential Messages in 2000, 2008, and 2016 respectively, praising the foundation's efforts. The foundation has also garnered widespread support from 49 U.S. governors. Notable individuals such as Senators Edward Kennedy, Chuck Schumer, Hillary Clinton, and Kirsten Gillibrand, seven White House cabinet members, three New York mayors, the Manhattan Borough President, various state and local elected officials, celebrities including Oprah Winfrey, and siblings across America have also commended the Siblings Day Foundation.

Siblings Day has expanded internationally, with fourteen countries including Australia, Brazil, Canada, Ghana, India, Ireland, Japan, New Zealand, Nigeria, the Philippines, Singapore, South Africa, Sweden, and the United Kingdom either continuing or adopting the celebration since 2014.

Siblings Day has gained attention through its coverage in various media outlets including CNN, Voice of America, International Business Times, and YouTube's global blog. It's also a popular topic on social media platforms such as Facebook, Twitter, Instagram, YouTube, and Tumblr.

Since its inception in 1995, Siblings Day has garnered widespread recognition. The U.S. Patent and Trademark Office granted it a "Service Mark" in 2007, which was renewed in 2020. The Siblings Day Foundation, has been working towards official recognition of the day. On February 25, 2023, the foundation penned a letter to President Biden requesting a Presidential Proclamation to establish the day as a commemorative event.

In Europe, the holiday was launched in 2014 by the European Large Families Confederation (ELFAC) to celebrate siblings' bonds and relationships on May 31. The May 31 feast spread in different ways in the European countries where ELFAC is present. In Portugal, Dia dos Irmãos has become very popular and the President of Republic of Portugal greeted it publicly, in 2016 and 2017.

The siblings' day is celebrated across European countries: Austria, Cyprus, Croatia, Czech Republic, Estonia, France, Germany, Greece, Hungary, Italy, Latvia, Lithuania, Portugal, Romania, Serbia and Switzerland. But adherence to the date and spirit of May 31 or April 10, the original date established for the Siblings Day, is open to any other European or non-European country.

== Celebration ==
In the United States, approximately 80% of people have at least one sibling. The holiday is intended to be a celebration of the relationship between brothers and sisters.

Examples of commemoration during this observance include: giving the sibling a gift (including a surprise gift), a gift card, and taking one out for dinner. Non-material examples of observances during this day includes giving hugs to one's sibling(s), enjoying time with them, honoring their presence in one's life, and greeting them on various social media platforms using childhood photos.

== Gallery ==
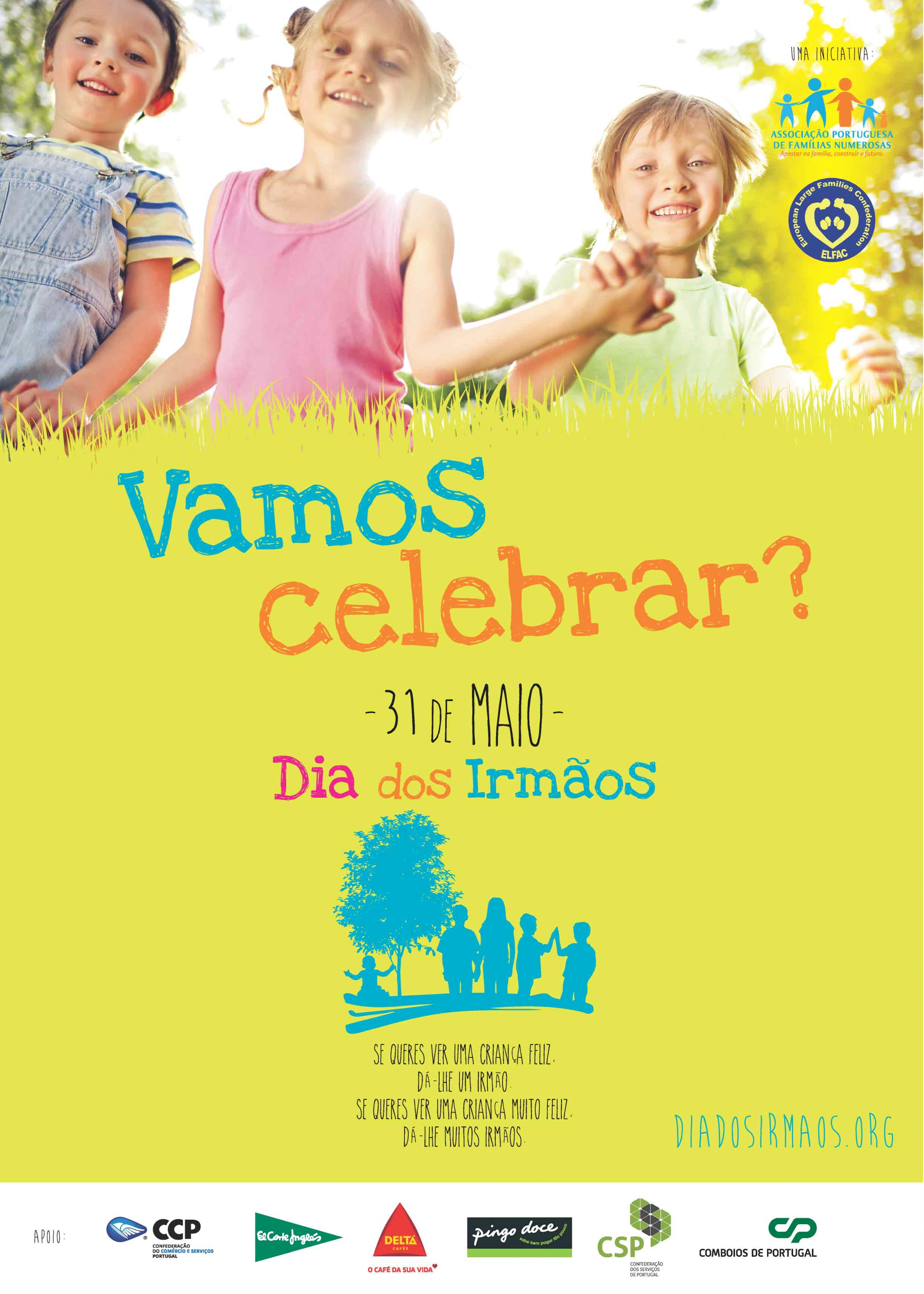
Siblings Day poster, published by APFN, the Portuguese Large Families Association, May 2016

== See also ==
- Children's Day
- Rakhri
- Raksha Bandhan: a popular, traditionally Hindu, annual Siblings Day
