= Marian McQuade =

American elder rights activist (1917–2008)

- Born: Marian Lucille Herndon; January 18, 1917; Caperton, West Virginia, U.S.
- Died: September 26, 2008 (aged 91); Oak Hill, West Virginia, U.S.

Marian McQuade (January 18, 1917 – September 26, 2008) was an American elder rights activist from West Virginia, best known as the founder of Grandparents' Day in the United States.

== Early life and education ==
McQuade was born Marian Lucille Herndon in Caperton, West Virginia on January 18, 1917. Like Mother's Day founder Anna Jarvis, she was a native West Virginian. As a child, she often visited elderly neighbors with her grandmother. After graduating high school, she went on to briefly attend nursing school. In 1936, she dropped out of school to marry Joe McQuade, a coal miner, whom she had first dated in high school.

== Activism ==
McQuade's first foray into activism was in 1956, when she organized an event for octogenarians in the state.

After the youngest of her 15 children graduating high school, McQuade focused on helping the elderly. She served on the West Virginia Commission on Aging, the Nursing Home Licensing Board, and the Vocational Rehabilitation Foundation.

For many years, she helped with the Past 80 Party, which was held annually in Richwood, WV. Jim Comstock, editor of 'The News Leader' and the West Virginia Hillbilly, originated the Past 80 Party.

In 1970, she ran for a seat in Congress as a Republican, but was defeated. In 1972, she ran for a seat in the West Virginia Senate, and was again unsuccessful. In 1971, McQuade was a delegate at the White House Conference on Aging. That same year, she was elected vice-chairman of the West Virginia Committee of Aging.

=== National Grandparents' Day ===
McQuade began campaigning for a National Grandparents Day in 1970, hoping it would allow nursing care patients a time to connect with their families. In 1973, West Virginia became the first state with a special day to honor grandparents when Governor Arch Moore proclaimed May 27, 1973, Grandparents Day. She continued to push other states to adopt the day as a yearly observance, helped by a group of volunteers who hailed primarily form her church. In September 1978, the White House called her to inform her that President Jimmy Carter had signed a bill designating the Sunday after Labor Day as National Grandparents Day beginning in 1979. Throughout her campaigning, McQuade remained adamant that the day be focused on homemade gifts and family time, rather than commercialism; at one point, she turned down royalties from a company selling Grandparents Day cards.

In 1989, the United States Postal Service issued a tenth anniversary commemorative envelope bearing the likeness of Marian McQuade in honor of National Grandparents Day.

In her later years, McQuade launched a website for National Grandparents' Day

== Later years and personal life ==
She later lived in Oak Hill, West Virginia with her husband, Joe McQuade (1915–2001). She died from heart failure at a nursing home in Oak Hill on September 26, 2008, at age 91.

McQuade had 15 children and 43 grandchildren.
