= Father's Day =

Celebration honoring fathers

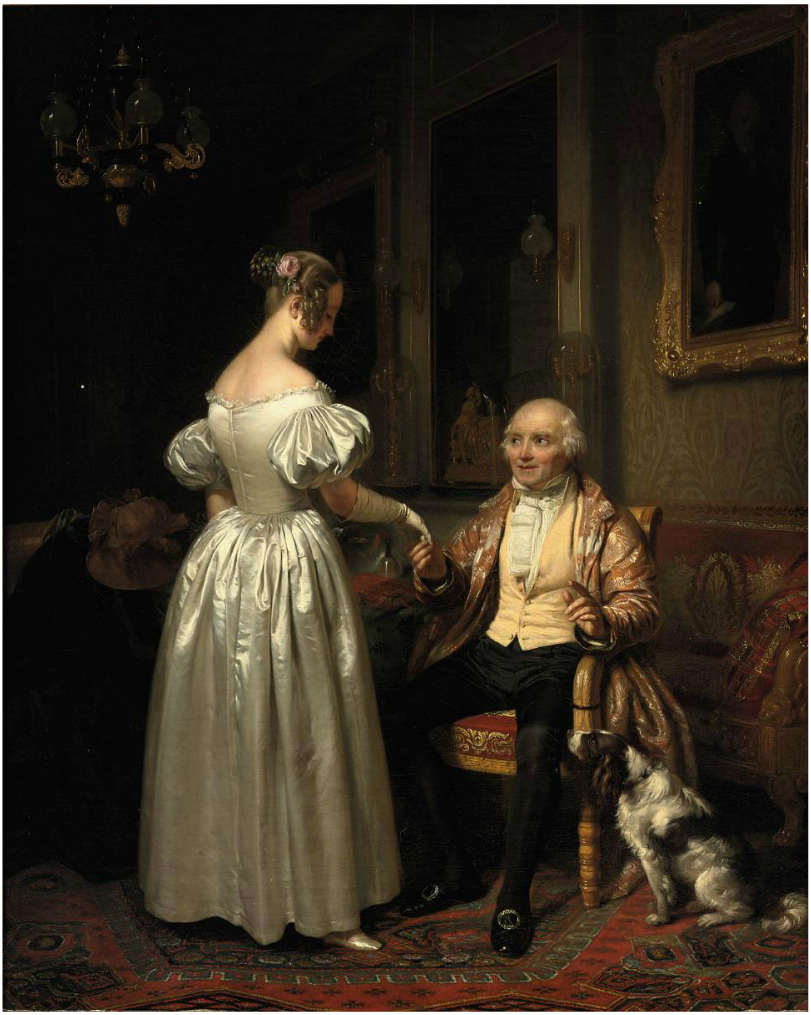
- Paternal Advice, painted by Josephus Laurentius Dyckmans
- Observed by: 112+ countries
- Type: Worldwide
- Significance: Honors Fathers and Fatherhood
- Date: Varies by country
- Duration: All Day
- Frequency: Annual
- Related to: Children's Day; Siblings Day; Mother's Day; Parents' Day; Grandparents' Day

Father's Day is a day set aside for honoring one's father, as well as fatherhood, paternal bonds, and the influence of fathers in society. "Father's Day" complements similar celebrations honoring family members, such as Mother's Day and, in some countries, Siblings Day, Children's Day, and Grandparents' Day. The day is held on various dates across the world, and different regions maintain their own traditions of honoring fatherhood.

In Catholic countries of Europe, it has been celebrated on 19 March as Saint Joseph's Day since the Middle Ages. In the United States, Father's Day was founded in the state of Washington by Sonora Smart Dodd in 1910. Father's Day is a recognized public holiday in Lithuania and some parts of Spain and was regarded as such in Italy until 1977. It is a national holiday in Samoa, and equivalently in South Korea, where it is celebrated as Parents' Day.

== History ==
For centuries, the Eastern Orthodox Church has appointed the second Sunday before Nativity as the Sunday of the Forefathers to commemorate the ancestors of Christ according to the flesh, starting with Adam and emphasizing the patriarch Abraham, to whom God said,

In thy seed shall all the nations of the earth be blessed

— Genesis 12:3, 22:18

This feast can fall between 11 and 17 December. This feast includes the ancestors of Mary, mother of Jesus and various prophets.

A customary day for the celebration of fatherhood in Catholic Europe is known to date back to at least 1508. It is usually celebrated on 19 March, as the feast day of Saint Joseph, who is referred to as the fatherly Nutritor Domini ("Nourisher of the Lord") in Catholicism and "the putative father of Jesus" in southern European tradition. This celebration was brought to the Americas by the Spanish and Portuguese. The Catholic Church actively supported the custom of a celebration of fatherhood on St. Joseph's Day from either the last years of the 14th century or from the early 15th century, apparently on the initiative of the Franciscans.

In the Coptic Orthodox Church, the celebration of fatherhood is also observed on St Joseph's Day, but the Copts observe this on 20 July. The Coptic celebration may date back to the fifth century.

In the United States, whether to celebrate this day nationwide or not is a matter for debate. In 1908, Grace Golden Clayton proposed the day to honor those men who had died in a mining accident in the US. Though it was not accepted then, in 1909 Sonora Smart Dodd, who along with her five brothers was raised by her father alone, after attending Mother's Day in a church, convinced the Spokane Ministerial Association to celebrate Father's Day nationwide.

In addition to Father's Day, International Men's Day is celebrated in many countries on 19 November in honor of both men and boys.

== Spelling ==
"Father's Day" is spelled as a singular possessive following the precedent established by its predecessor, Mother's Day. In 1912, Anna Jarvis trademarked the phrase "Second Sunday in May, Mother's Day, Anna Jarvis, Founder." Jarvis specifically noted that "Mother's" should "be a singular possessive, for each family to honor its own mother, not a plural possessive commemorating all mothers in the world."

== Dates ==
The following is a list of when Father's Day is celebrated, in order of date of observance.

Gregorian calendar
Occurrence	Dates	Country
Soldier's Day (Note: As with Russia, the celebration is officially for people who served or are serving in the Mongolian Armed Forces, but the congratulations are for all fathers and all other adult men and male children as well.)	18 March	Mongolia
St. Joseph's Day	19 March	Andorra (Dia del Pare); Angola; Antwerp (Belgium); Bolivia; Croatia; Honduras; Italy (Festa del papà); Liechtenstein; Mozambique (Dia do Pai); Portugal (Dia do Pai); Spain (Día del Padre); Ticino (Festa del papà); Libya (Festa del papà); Kosovo (Dita e Babait)
	8 May	South Korea (Parents' Day)
Second Sunday in May	11 May 2025; 10 May 2026; 9 May 2027	Romania (Ziua Tatălui)
Third Sunday in May	18 May 2025; 17 May 2026; 16 May 2027	Tonga
Ascension Day	29 May 2025; 14 May 2026; 6 May 2027	Germany
First Sunday in June	1 June 2025; 7 June 2026; 6 June 2027	Lithuania (Tėvo diena); Switzerland
	5 June	Denmark (also Constitution Day)
Second Sunday in June	8 June 2025; 14 June 2026; 13 June 2027	Austria (Vatertag); Belgium
Third Sunday in June	15 June 2025; 21 June 2026; 20 June 2027	Afghanistan; Algeria; Albania; Antigua and Barbuda; Argentina (except Jujuy and Mendoza); Aruba; Bahamas; Bahrain; Bangladesh; Barbados; Belize; Bermuda; Bosnia and Herzegovina; Botswana; Brunei; Burkina Faso; Cambodia; Canada; Chad; Chile; China**; Colombia; Comoros; Costa Rica; Cuba; Curaçao; Cyprus; Czech Republic; Dominica; Ecuador; Eswatini; Ethiopia; France; Georgia; Ghana; Greece; Guernsey; Guyana; Hong Kong; Hungary; India; Ireland; Isle of Man; Ivory Coast; Jamaica; Japan; Jersey; Kazakhstan; Kenya; Kuwait; Laos; Macau; Mali; Madagascar; Malaysia; Maldives; Malta; Mauritius; Mexico; Morocco; Namibia; Netherlands; Nigeria; Oman; Pakistan; Panama; Paraguay; Peru; Philippines; Qatar; Saint Lucia; Saint Vincent and the Grenadines; Saudi Arabia; Senegal; Singapore; Sierra Leone; Slovakia; Slovenia; South Africa; Sri Lanka; Suriname; Tanzania; Trinidad and Tobago; Tunisia; Turkey; Uganda; Ukraine; United Kingdom; United States; Venezuela; Vietnam; Zambia; Zimbabwe
	17 June	Armenia; El Salvador; Guatemala
	19 June	Azerbaijan
	21 June	Egypt; Jordan; Lebanon; Syria; United Arab Emirates
	23 June	Nicaragua; Poland
Last Sunday in June	29 June 2025; 28 June 2026; 27 June 2027	Haiti
Second Sunday in July	13 July 2025; 12 July 2026; 11 July 2027	Uruguay
Last Sunday in July	27 July 2025; 26 July 2026; 25 July 2027	Dominican Republic
	8 August (Note: ROC only. Though Father's Day on 8 August was first celebrated in Shanghai in 1945, there is no longer an official Father's Day in mainland China since 1949.)	Taiwan
Second Sunday in August	10 August 2025; 9 August 2026; 8 August 2027	Brazil (Dia dos Pais); Samoa
Last Monday in August	25 August 2025; 31 August 2026; 30 August 2027	South Sudan
First Sunday in September	7 September 2025; 6 September 2026; 5 September 2027	Australia; Fiji; New Zealand; Papua New Guinea
Second Sunday in September	14 September 2025; 13 September 2026; 12 September 2027	Latvia
First Sunday in October	5 October 2025; 4 October 2026; 3 October 2027	Luxembourg
Third Sunday in October	19 October 2025 18 October 2026; 17 October 2027	Russia
	21 October	Belarus
Second Sunday in November	9 November 2025; 8 November 2026; 14 November 2027	Estonia (Isadepäev); Finland (Isänpäivä); Iceland (Feðradagur); Norway (Farsdag); Sweden (Fars dag)
	12 November	Indonesia
	5 December	Thailand (the birthday of King Bhumibol Adulyadej)
	26 December	Bulgaria
Hebrew calendar
Occurrence	Equivalent Gregorian dates	Country
30 Shevat	Between 30 January and 1 March 28 February 2025; 17 February 2026; 7 February 2027	Israel (Family Day)
Hindu calendar
Definition	Equivalent Gregorian dates	Country/territory
Kushe Aunsi (Bhadrapada Amavasya)	Between 30 August and 30 September	Nepal
Islamic calendar
Occurrence	Equivalent Gregorian dates	Country/territory
13 Rajab, Ali Ibn Abi Talib's birthday	13 January 2025; 2 January 2026; 22 December 2026; 11 December 2027	Bahrain; Iran; Iraq; Kuwait; Mauritania; Somalia; Sudan; Yemen
Burmese calendar
Occurrence	Equivalent Gregorian dates	Country/territory
Full Moon Day of Tabaung	in February or March 13 March 2025; 2 March 2026 ?	Myanmar (Father's Day)

Map of dates when Father's Day is celebrated

== African traditions ==
=== Algeria ===
In Algeria, the third Sunday in June is the dedicated day to celebrate the Father's Day.

=== Kenya ===
In Kenya, Father's Day is celebrated on the third Sunday of June and is not a public holiday.

=== Morocco ===
In Morocco, the third Sunday in June is the dedicated day to celebrate the Father's Day.

=== Mozambique ===
In Mozambique, Father's Day is observed on 19 March every year.

=== Nigeria ===
In Nigeria, the third Sunday in June is the dedicated day to celebrate Father's Day.

=== Seychelles ===
In Seychelles, Father's Day is celebrated on 16 June and is not a public holiday.

=== South Africa ===
In South Africa, Father's Day is celebrated on the third Sunday of June. It is not a public holiday.

=== South Sudan ===
In South Sudan, Father's Day is celebrated on the last Monday of August. President Salva Kiir proclaimed it before 27 August 2012. First celebrated on 27 August 2012, Father's Day was not celebrated in South Sudan in 2011 (due to the country's independence).

=== Sudan ===
In Sudan, Father's Day (عيد الأب), is celebrated on 21 June.

== Asian traditions ==
=== Bangladesh ===
In Bangladesh there is no historical tradition of celebrating Father's Day (Bengali/Bangla: বাবা/আব্বু দিবস, Baba/abbu dibosh) and has been popularized by Western influences in the country. It is celebrated on the third Sunday of June, and is not a public holiday. Father's Day was not very popular and had been made more widespread by the Millennial and Generation Z communities all over the country through social media in recent times. Even though many religious families do not celebrate it, it is more widespread than ever.

=== Cambodia ===
In Cambodia, Father's Day is celebrated on the 15th of June.

=== China ===
In the People's Republic of China, there is no official Father's Day. Some people celebrate on the third Sunday of June, according to the tradition of the United States. Father's Day is also celebrated in the special administrative regions. In Hong Kong, it is celebrated on the third Sunday of June and is not a public holiday. In Macau, Father's Day (Dia do Pai) is celebrated on the third Sunday of June and is not a public holiday.

=== India ===
Father's Day is not an original custom in India but is rather followed by the influence of the Western world. It is observed on the third Sunday of June. This event is not a public holiday. The day is usually celebrated only in larger cities like Mumbai, New Delhi, Chennai, Bengaluru, Pune, Kolkata, Jaipur, Lucknow and others. It is a huge holiday in the North Eastern state of Nagaland and Kerala where prayers are held in church on Sunday Services. After this day was first observed in the United States in 1908 and gradually gained popularity, Indian metropolitan cities, much later, followed suit by recognising this event. In India, the day is usually celebrated with children giving gifts such as greeting cards, electronic gadgets, shirts, gold necklaces, coffee mugs or books to their fathers.

=== Indonesia ===
In Indonesia, Father's Day is celebrated on 12 November and is not a public holiday. Father's Day in Indonesia was first declared in 2006 in Surakarta City Hall attended by hundreds of people from various community groups, including people from community of inter-religion communication. Because of its recent declaration, there is not much hype about the celebration, compared to the celebration of Mother's Day on 22 December. Google also created its doodle for Indonesia in 2019 and 2020.

=== Iran ===
In Iran before the revolution, the 24th of Esfand, Reza Shah's birthday, was called Father's Day based on the Iranian calendar. After the revolution of 1979, this day was changed to the 13th of Rajab, the birthday of Ali bin Abi Talib, the first imam of Shiites. Zoroastrians also celebrate Shahrivargan as Father's Day.

=== Israel ===
In Israel, Father's Day is usually celebrated as part of Family Day on 30 Shevat, though some celebrate on 1 May together with Workers' Day or Labor Day.

=== Japan ===
In Japan, Father's Day (父の日, chichi no hi) is celebrated on the third Sunday of June and is not a public holiday. Common presents are sake, shochu, fashion items, some kinds of gourmet food, sports equipment and various sweets.

=== Kazakhstan ===
Since 2012, Kazakhstan celebrates Defender of the Fatherland Day (Kazakh: Отан Қорғаушы күні) to commemorate the foundation of the armed forces. It is also called Army Day and it is celebrated on 7 May. Kazakh society perceives it as 'a men's day' and honoring men so it is vaguely a celebration of fathers.

=== Malaysia ===
In Malaysia, Father's Day is celebrated on the third Sunday of June and is not a public holiday.

=== Mongolia ===
The Mongolian Men's Association began the celebration of Father's Day on 8 August 2005.

=== Nepal ===
The Nepalese Hindus as well as the Newars in Nepal honors fathers on the day of Kushe aunsi (Nepali: कुशे औंसी), which occurs in late August or early September, depending on the year, since it depends on the lunar calendar. According to Hindu calendar, the festival falls on the new moon day of Bhadra month. It is also known as Gokarna Aunsi or Pitri Tirpani Aunsi.

In recent years, Nepalese non–Hindus have also adopted the Kushe Aunsi day. It is commonly known as Buwaako mukh herne din (Nepali: बुवाको मुख हेर्ने दिन, lit. 'day for looking at father's face') or Abu ya Khwa Swoyegu in Nepal Bhasa. The celebration of the festival has been modernized in some ways in recent years. Children worship their father on this day, put tika on his forehead and give him sweets, delicacies and gifts as a part of celebration. In return, the father blesses good fortune to his children.

On the new moon day (Amavasya), it is traditional to pay respect to one's deceased father; Hindus go to the Shiva temple of Gokarneswor Mahadev, in Gokarna, a suburb of Kathmandu while Buddhists go to Jana Bahal (Seto Machhendranath or white Tara) temple in Kathmandu.

Traditionally, in the Kathmandu Valley, the south-western corner is reserved for women and women-related rituals, and the north-eastern is for men and men-related rituals. The worship place for Mata Tirtha Aunsi ('Mother Pilgrimage New Moon') is located in Mata Tirtha in the south-western half of the valley, while the worship place for Gokarna Aunsi is located in the north-eastern half. This division is reflected in many aspects of the life in the Kathmandu Valley.

=== Pakistan ===
Father's Day is celebrated on the third Sunday of June. The Rutgers WPF launched a campaign titled 'Greening Pakistan – Promoting Responsible Fatherhood' on Father's Day (Sunday, 18 June 2017) across Pakistan to promote active fatherhood and responsibility for the care and upbringing of children. Father's Day is not a public holiday in Pakistan.

=== Philippines ===
In the Philippines, Father's Day is officially celebrated every third Sunday of June according to a recent presidential proclamation, but it is not a public holiday. It is more widely observed by the public on the third Sunday of June perhaps due to American influence and as proclaimed in 1988 by Philippine President Corazon Aquino.

Under Proclamation No. 58, series of 1998, issued by then Philippine President Joseph Ejercito Estrada, the first Monday of December of every year was designated as Mother's Day and Father's Day, expressly repealing the third Sunday of June observance.

=== Singapore ===
In Singapore, Father's Day is celebrated on the third Sunday of June but is not a public holiday.

=== South Korea ===
In South Korea, Parents' Day (Korean: 어버이날) is celebrated on 8 May and is not a public holiday. Setting Parents' Day as a national holiday and holding a pan-national event is intended to inherit and develop traditional ethical standards such as filial piety and senior citizens' ideology. Regardless of age or gender, this day is also an opportunity to reaffirm that traditional filial piety is a crucial norm and cultural value in modern society. The ceremony to mark Parents' Day as an anniversary and put on carnations stems from a Christian culture. As Western religions and cultures entered, this holiday, which was introduced together, became the most traditional holiday combined with Confucian filial piety in the process of establishing itself.

=== Sri Lanka ===
Father's Day (Sinhala: පියවරුන්ගේ දිනය, Piyawarunge dhinaya; Tamil: தந்தையர் தினம், Thanthaiyar Thinam) is observed on the third Sunday of June. It is not a public holiday. Many schools hold special events to honor fathers.

=== Syria ===
In Syria, Father's Day is celebrated annually on June 21. This date aligns with the summer solstice and is observed in several Arab countries, including Egypt, Jordan, Lebanon, Palestine, and the United Arab Emirates.

=== Taiwan ===
In Taiwan, Father's Day is not an official holiday, but is widely observed on 8 August, the eighth day of the eighth month of the year. In Mandarin Chinese, the pronunciation of the number eight is bā, and the pronunciation is very similar to the character 爸 (bà), which means "pa" or "dad". The eighth day of the eighth month (bā-bā) is a pun for dad (爸爸; bàba). Taiwan, therefore, sometimes refer to 8 August as "Bābā Holiday" as a pun for "Dad's Holiday" (爸爸節) or the more formal "Father's Day" (父親節).

=== Thailand ===
In Thailand, Father's Day is celebrated annually on 5 December, which is the birthday of King Bhumibol Adulyadej (Rama IX). Both Father's Day and Mother's Day are recognized as national public holidays in Thailand. Traditionally, Thai people honor their fathers and grandfathers by presenting them with a canna flower, which is regarded as a symbol of masculinity. However, this practice has become less common in recent years. On this day, many Thais wear yellow to pay tribute to the King, as yellow represents Monday, the day of the week on which the King was born.

A central aspect of the celebration involves large gatherings at Sanam Luang, the royal ceremonial ground in front of the Grand Palace in Bangkok, where people would traditionally assemble to listen to the King's annual address. Many remain into the evening for a national candle-lighting ceremony, during which participants demonstrate their loyalty and reverence for the monarch. Similar ceremonies are held across the country in towns and villages, and even abroad in Thai communities and embassies.

Father's Day began to gain widespread national popularity in the 1980s, largely due to a campaign initiated by Prime Minister Prem Tinsulanonda, who aimed to promote loyalty to the Thai royal family. In parallel, Mother's Day in Thailand is observed on 12 August, which marks the birthday of Queen Sirikit, King Bhumibol Adulyadej's consort.

=== Turkey ===
In Turkey, Father's Day is celebrated on the third Sunday in June and is not a public holiday.

=== United Arab Emirates ===
In the United Arab Emirates, Father's Day is celebrated on 21 June.

== European traditions ==
=== Roman Catholicism ===
In the Roman Catholic tradition, fathers are celebrated on Saint Joseph's Day (commonly called the Feast of Saint Joseph), 19 March, though in certain countries Father's Day has become a secular celebration. It is also common for Catholics to honor their "spiritual father", their parish priest, on Father's Day.

=== Austria ===
In Austria, Father's Day (Vatertag) is celebrated on the second Sunday of June and it is not a public holiday.

=== Belarus ===
In Belarus Father's Day is celebrated on 21 October.

=== Belgium ===
In Belgium, Father's Day (Vaderdag/Fête des Pères) is celebrated on the second Sunday of June or 14 June, and it is not a public holiday, except for Antwerp where it is celebrated on 19 March.

=== Bulgaria ===
In Bulgaria, Father's Day is celebrated on 26 December and it is not a public holiday. According to the Eastern Orthodox tradition, fathers are celebrated on Saint Joseph's Day – one day after Christmas.

=== Croatia ===
In Croatia, according to the Roman Catholic tradition, fathers are celebrated on Saint Joseph's Day (Dan svetog Josipa), 19 March. It is not a public holiday.

=== Denmark ===
In Denmark, Father's Day (Fars dag) is celebrated on 5 June. It coincides with Constitution Day.

=== Estonia ===
In Estonia, Father's Day (Isadepäev) is celebrated on the second Sunday of November. It is an established flag flying day and a national holiday.

=== Finland ===
In Finland, Father's Day (Finnish: Isänpäivä; Swedish: Fars dag) is celebrated on the second Sunday of November. It is an established flag flying day.

=== France ===
In France, lighter manufacturer Flaminaire introduced the idea of Father's Day first in 1949, for commercial reasons. Director Marcel Quercia wanted to sell their lighter in France. In 1950, they introduced "la Fête des Pères", which would take place every third Sunday of June (following the American example). Their slogan is "Nos papas nous l'ont dit, pour la fête des pères, ils désirent tous un Flaminaire" (Our dads told us, for Father's Day, they all want a Flaminaire). In 1952, the holiday was officially decreed. A national Father's Day committee was set up to give a prize for fathers who deserved it most (originally, candidates were nominated by the social services of each town hall's/mayor's office). This complements la Fête des Mères (Mother's Day), which was made official in France in 1928 and added to the calendar in Vichy France in 1941.

=== Germany ===
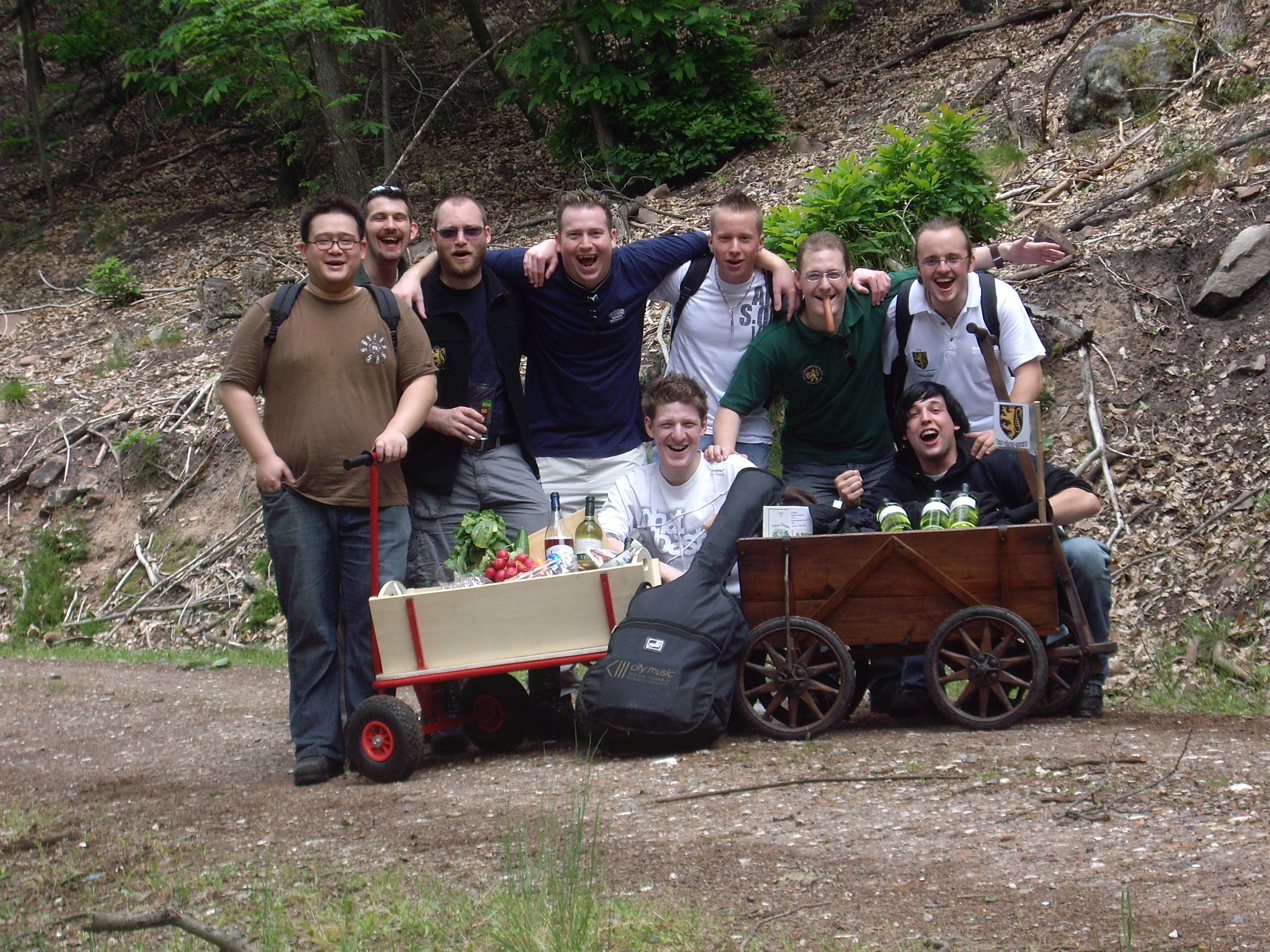
Hiking tour on Father's Day with smaller wagons.

In Germany, Father's Day (Vatertag) is celebrated differently from other parts of the world, as it is celebrated on Ascension Day (the Thursday forty days after Easter), which is a federal holiday. Regionally, it is also called gentlemen's day, Herrentag or Männertag (men's day). It is a tradition for groups of males (young and old, but usually excluding pre-teenage boys) to do a hiking tour with one or more smaller wagons, Bollerwagen, pulled by manpower. In the wagons are wine or beer bottles (according to the region) and traditional regional food, Hausmannskost. Many men use this holiday as an opportunity to get drunk. According to the Federal Statistical Office of Germany, alcohol-related traffic accidents triple on this day. The tradition of Father's Day is especially prevalent in Eastern Germany.

These traditions are probably rooted in Christian Ascension Day's processions to the farmlands, which has been celebrated since the 18^{th} century. Men would be seated in a wooden cart and carried to the village's plaza, and the mayor would award a prize to the father who had the most children, usually with a big piece of ham. In the late 19^{th} century the religious component was progressively lost, especially in urban areas such as Berlin, and groups of men organized walking excursions with beer and ham. By the 20^{th} century, alcohol consumption had become a major part of the tradition. Many people will take the following Friday off work, and some schools are closed on that Friday as well; many people then use the resulting four-day-long weekend for a short vacation.

=== Greece ===
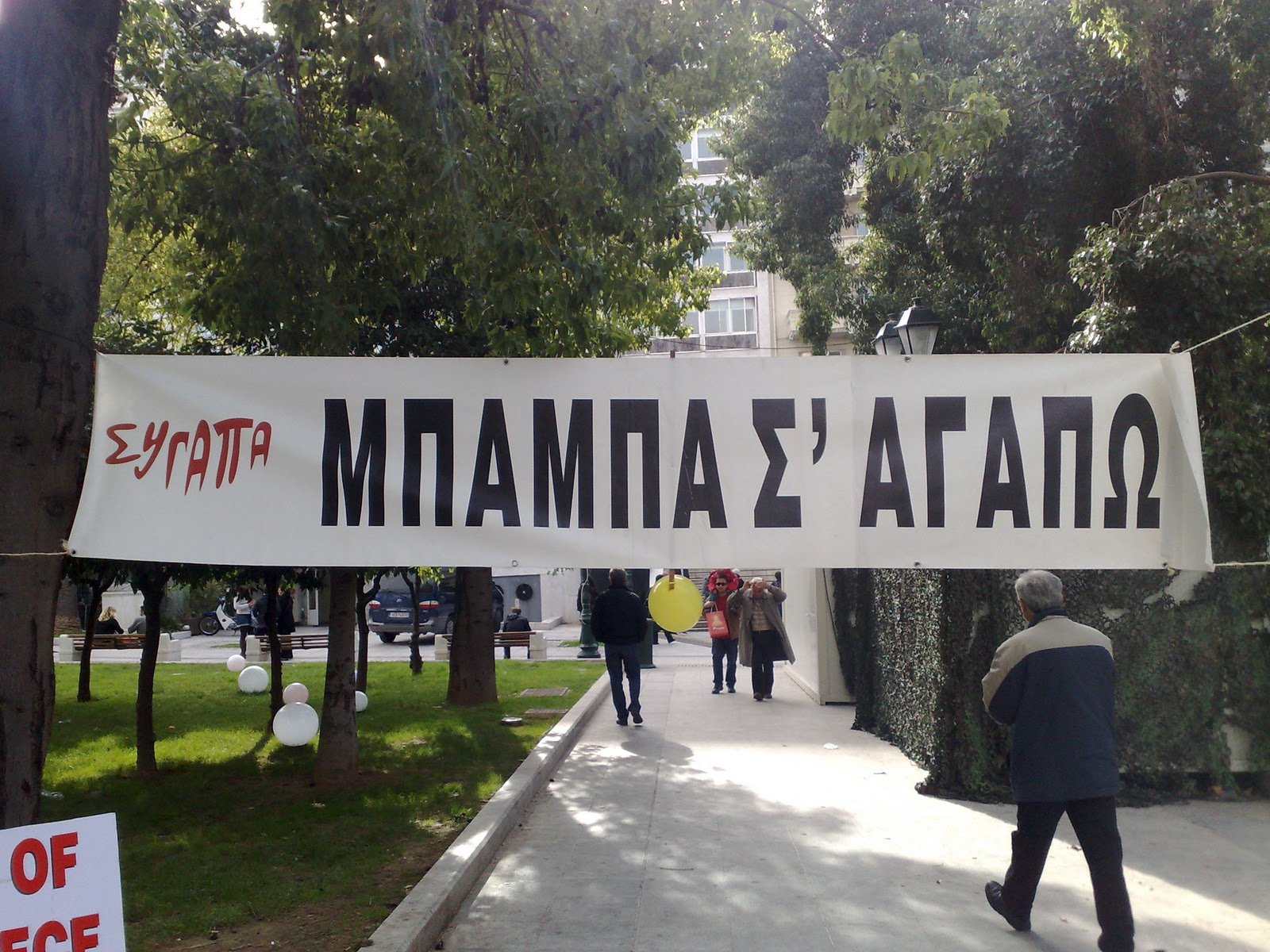
A 2004 outdoor banner at Syntagma Square, Athens, Greece, with the message "Μπαμπά Σ'αγαπώ", i.e. "Daddy I love you".

In Greece, Father's Day (η γιορτή του πατέρα) is officially celebrated on the third Sunday of June. The SYGAPA association, which supports the needs of divorced fathers, raises awareness and advocates for the father's role in society, also organizes various events on the day across the country.

=== Hungary ===
In Hungary, Father's Day is celebrated on the third Sunday of June and is not a public holiday.

=== Iceland ===
In Iceland, Father's Day is celebrated on the second Sunday of November.

=== Italy ===
In Italy, according to the Roman Catholic tradition, Father's Day is celebrated on Saint Joseph's Day, commonly called the Feast of Saint Joseph (Festa di San Giuseppe), 19 March. It was a public holiday until 1977.

=== Latvia ===
In Latvia, Father's Day (Tēvu diena) is celebrated on the second Sunday of September and is not a public holiday. In Latvia people did not always celebrate this day because of the USSR's influence with its own holidays. This day in Latvia was officially born in 2008 when it was celebrated and marked in the calendar for the first time on 14 September (second Sunday of September) to promote the idea that man as the father must be satisfied and proud of his family and children, also, the father is important to gratitude and loving words from his family for devoted to continuous altruistic concerns. Because this day is new to the country it does not have established unique traditions, but people borrow ideas from other countries' Father's Day traditions to congratulate fathers in Latvia.

=== Lithuania ===
In Lithuania, Father's Day (Tėvo diena) is celebrated on the first Sunday of June and is a public holiday. During the interwar period, there was an effort to popularize Father's Day like Mother's Day. It was suggested to celebrate it on the first Sunday of June. Not receiving support, an attempt was made to move the holiday to the first Sunday of September, arguing that such a time is more convenient since the major farm work would already be finished. There were also other occasional calls to celebrate Father's Day, but it was celebrated more actively after the restoration of independence, and Father's Day was officially recognized as a public holiday only in 2009.

=== Malta ===
Malta has followed the international trend and celebrates Father's Day on the third Sunday in June. As in the case of Mother's Day, the introduction of Father's Day celebrations in Malta was encouraged by Frans H Said (Uncle Frans of the children's radio programs). The first mention of Father's Day was in June 1977, and the day is now part of the local events calendar.

=== Netherlands ===
In the Netherlands (including its constituent countries in the Caribbean), Father's Day (Vaderdag) is celebrated on the third Sunday of June and is not a public holiday. Traditionally, as on Mother's Day, fathers get breakfast in bed made by their children and families gather together and have dinner, usually at the grandparents' house. In recent years, families also started having dinner out, and as on Mother's Day, it is one of the busiest days for restaurants. At school, children handcraft presents for their fathers. Consumer goods companies have all sorts of special offers for fathers: socks, ties, electronics, suits, and men's healthcare products.

=== Norway ===
In Norway, Father's Day (Farsdag), is celebrated on the second Sunday of November. It is not a public holiday.

=== Poland ===
In Poland, Father's Day (Polish: Dzień Ojca) is celebrated on 23 June and is not a public holiday. Google recognized Poland in its Father's Day 2019 Doodle.

=== Portugal ===
Father's Day (Dia do Pai) is celebrated on 19 March (see Roman Catholic tradition below) in Portugal. It is not a bank and public holiday.

=== Romania ===
The law instituting the celebration of Father's Day in Romania passed on 29 September 2009, and stated that Father's Day will be celebrated annually on the second Sunday of May. The first time it was celebrated was on 9 May 2010.

=== Russia ===
In 2021, President Vladimir Putin established the Father's Day as falling on the third Sunday of October.

=== Slovakia ===
In Slovakia, Father's Day (Slovak: deň otcov) is celebrated on the third Sunday of June. It is not a public holiday.

=== Spain ===
Father's Day (El Día del Padre) is observed on the feast day of Saint Joseph, which is 19 March. It is celebrated as a public holiday in some regions of Spain.

=== Sweden ===
In Sweden, Father's Day (Fars dag), is celebrated on the second Sunday of November but is not a public holiday.

=== Switzerland ===
In most of Switzerland the holiday is celebrated on the first Sunday of June; in Ticino, the Italian speaking canton, it is an official public holiday, celebrated on 19 March.

=== Turkey ===
In Turkey, Father's Day is celebrated on the third Sunday in June and is not a public holiday.

=== Ukraine ===
In Ukraine, Father's Day (Ukrainian: День батька, romanized: Den batka) is celebrated on the third Sunday of June. It is not a public holiday.

=== United Kingdom ===
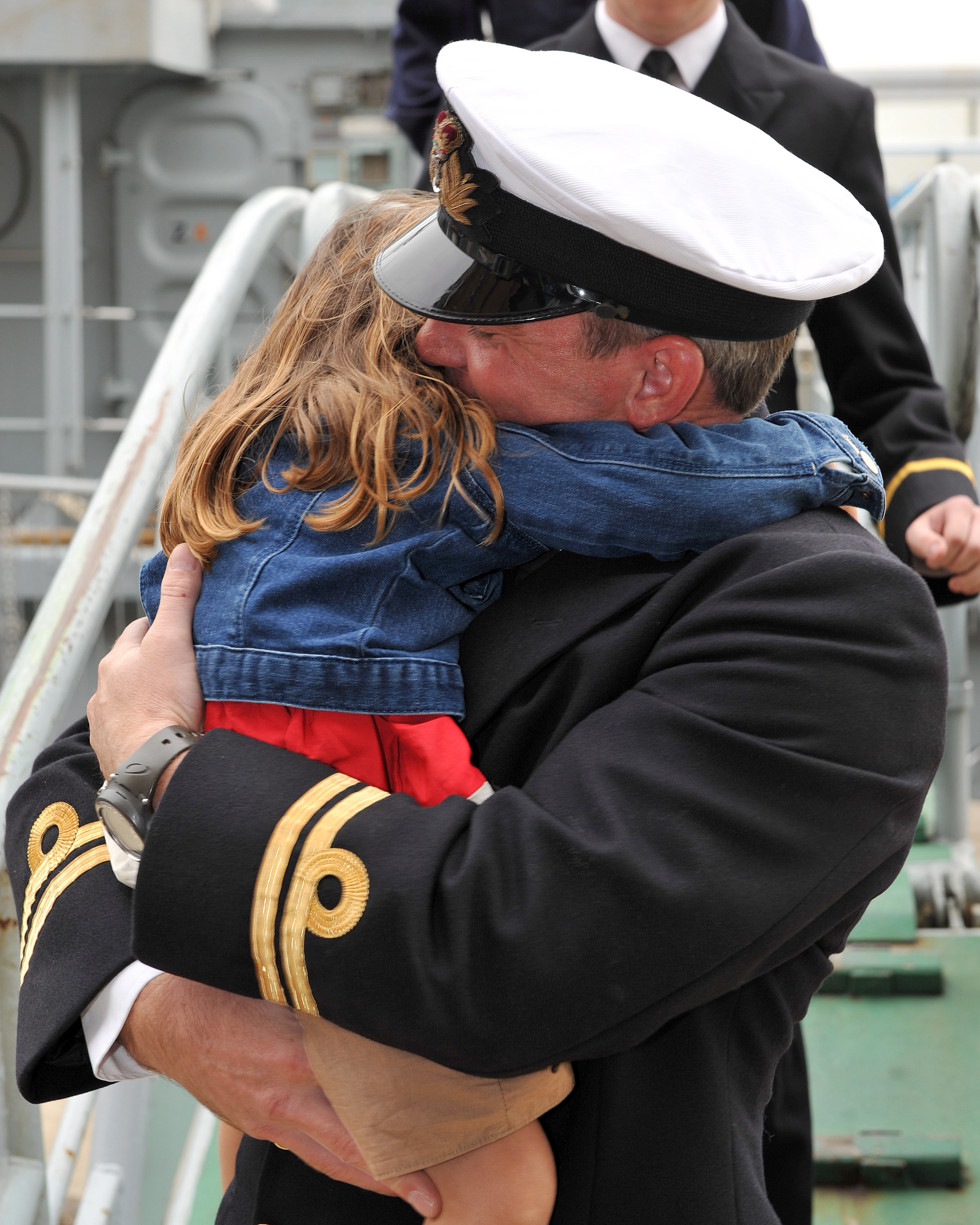
A Royal Navy Officer hugs his daughter after returning from a long deployment on HMS Chiddingfold

In the United Kingdom, Father's Day is celebrated on the third Sunday of June. The day does not have a long tradition; Steve Roud, in The English Year (2006), states that it entered British popular culture "sometime after the Second World War, not without opposition".

== North American traditions ==
=== Bahamas, Barbados, Belize, Cuba and Puerto Rico ===
Father's Day is celebrated on the third Sunday of June and is not a public holiday.

=== Canada ===
In Canada, Father's Day (French: Fête des Pères) is celebrated on the third Sunday of June and is not a public holiday. Father's Day typically involves spending time with one's father or the father figures in one's life. Small family gatherings and the giving of gifts may be part of the festivities organized for Father's Day.

=== Central America (except for Belize) ===
In Costa Rica, the Social Christian Unity Party presented a bill to change the celebration of Father's Day from the third Sunday of June to 19 March, the day of Saint Joseph. That was to give tribute to this saint, who gave his name to the capital of the country San José, Costa Rica, so family heads will be able to celebrate Father's Day at the same time as the Feast of Saint Joseph the Worker. The official date is still the third Sunday of June.

While in Honduras is officially celebrated on March 19, the feast day of Saint Joseph. This Catholic tradition, also observed in Spain, Bolivia, and parts of Europe, associates fatherhood with the figure of Joseph as a protector and provider.

Guatemala and El Salvador both celebrate on June 17. This is rare as it is a fixed date not tied to a Sunday. In El Salvador is considered a national public holiday.

Nicaragua celebrates on June 23, also a fixed date.

=== Dominican Republic ===
In Dominican Republic, Father's Day is celebrated on the third Sunday of July and is not a public holiday.

=== Haiti ===
In Haiti, Father's Day (Fête des pères) is celebrated on the last Sunday of June and is not a public holiday. Fathers are recognized and celebrated on this day with cards, gifts, breakfast, lunch, brunch or early Sunday dinner; whether enjoying the day at the beach or mountains, spending family time or doing favorite activities.

Children exclaim "bonne fête papa", while everyone wishes all fathers "bonne Fête des Pères" (Happy Father's Day).

=== Mexico ===
In Mexico, Father's Day is celebrated on the third Sunday of June and is not a public holiday. Father's Day typically involves spending time with one's father or the father figures in one's life. Small family gatherings and the giving of gifts may be part of the festivities organized for Father's Day.

=== Trinidad and Tobago ===
In Trinidad and Tobago, Father's Day is celebrated on the third Sunday of June and is not a public holiday.

=== United States ===
In the US, Father's Day is celebrated on the third Sunday of June. Typically, families gather to celebrate the father figures in their lives. Schools (if in session) and other children's programs commonly have activities to make Father's Day gifts.

== Oceanian traditions ==
=== Australia ===
In Australia, Father's Day is celebrated on the first Sunday of September, which is the first Sunday of spring in Australia. Most families present fathers with gifts and cards, and share a meal. It is not a public holiday.

The idea of Father's Day wasn't initially well received in Australia in the 1910s and 1920s. Many thought it was either unnecessary or undermined a father's assumed “supremacy” as head of the household. Newspapers at the time printed satirical poems and critical editorials of the new tradition. Father's Day was originally observed in June, matching the USA date, with church services and the wearing of a red flower. In June 1925, Janet Heyden of Sydney (who also advocated for Mother's Day celebrations in Australia) began collecting donations to bring cheer to elderly men in nursing/charity homes. While Mother's Day became instantly popular, it wasn't until the 1930s that Father's Day came to be popularly celebrated in Australia on the first Sunday in September. The Father's Day Council of Australia was established in 1957 and continues to honour distinguished fathers with an annual Australian Father of the Year award. Father's Day traditions in Australia include school crafts with handmade gifts and cards from younger children, taking dad out for lunch, BBQs, and outdoor family activities. Public schools often hold a Father's Day gift stall with inexpensive presents for fathers, grandfathers, carers, or other role-models.

YMCA Victoria continues the tradition of honoring the role fathers and father figures play in parenting through the annual awarding of Local Community Father of the Year in 32 municipalities in Victoria. The Father's Day Council of Victoria also annually recognizes fathers in the Victorian Father of the Year Award.

=== New Zealand ===
In New Zealand, Father's Day is celebrated on the first Sunday of September and it is not a public holiday. Father's Day was first observed at St Matthew's Church, Auckland on 14 July 1929 and first appeared in commercial advertising the following year. By 1931 other churches had adopted the day and in 1935 much of Australia moved to mark the day at the beginning of September. New Zealand followed this, with a Wellington advert in 1937 and a Christchurch Salvation Army service in 1938.

=== Samoa ===
In Samoa, Father's Day is celebrated on the second Sunday in August, and is a recognized national holiday on the Monday following.

=== Fiji ===
In Fiji, Father's Day is celebrated in September. Fathers Day is usually on the first Sunday and then the Father's Day for some Christian denominations is usually celebrated on the second Sunday.

== South American traditions ==
=== Argentina ===
Father's Day in Argentina is celebrated on the third Sunday of June.

Attempts have been made to change the date to 24 August, to commemorate the day on which the "Father of the Nation", José de San Martín, became a father. In 1953, the proposal to celebrate Father's Day in all educational establishments on 24 August, in honor of José de San Martín, was raised to the General Direction of Schools of Mendoza Province. The day was celebrated for the first time in 1958, on the third Sunday of June, but it was not included in the school calendars due to pressure from several groups.

Schools in the Mendoza Province continued to celebrate Father's Day on 24 August, and in 1982 the provincial governor passed a law declaring Father's Day in the province to be celebrated on that day.

In 2004, a proposal to change the date to 24 August was presented to the Argentine Chamber of Deputies as a single, unified project.

=== Bolivia ===
In Bolivia Father's Day (Día del padre, in Spanish) is celebrated on 19 March (Saint Joseph Day). People usually give a present to their fathers and spend time with them.

=== Brazil ===
In Brazil Fathers' Day (Dia dos Pais, in Portuguese a plural form) is celebrated three months after Mother's Day, on the second Sunday of August. Publicist Sylvio Bhering picked the day in honor of Saint Joachim, patron of fathers. While it is not an official holiday (see Public holidays in Brazil), it is widely observed and typically involves spending time with and giving gifts to one's father or father figure.

=== Chile ===
In Chile Father's Day (Día del padre, in Spanish) is officially celebrated on 19 June.

=== Colombia ===
In Colombia, Father's Day (Día del padre, in Spanish) is celebrated on the third Sunday of June. In 2022, it was officially celebrated on 26 June to avoid coinciding with the second round of the presidential elections.

=== Paraguay ===
In Paraguay, Father's Day is typically celebrated the third Sunday of June with a traditional banquet of Paraguayan barbecue. In Paraguay Father's Day is a very important day, and is celebrated with much fervor.

=== Peru ===
In Peru, Father's Day is celebrated on the third Sunday of June and is not a public holiday. People usually give a present to their fathers and spend time with them mostly during a family meal.

== See also ==
- List of films set around Father's Day
