= Sonora Smart Dodd =

American activist (1882–1978)

Sonora Louise Smart Dodd (February 18, 1882 – March 22, 1978) was the daughter of American Civil War veteran William Jackson Smart, and was responsible for the founding of Father's Day.

== Early life ==
Sonora Louise Smart was born in Jenny Lind, Arkansas to William Jackson Smart (1842–1919) and Ellen Victoria Cheek Smart (1851–98) on February 18, 1882. In 1889, when Sonora was seven years old, the Smart family moved from Marion, Arkansas, to a farm west of Spokane, Washington between Creston and Wilbur.

When Sonora was 16, her mother died in childbirth with her sixth child. Sonora was the only daughter and shared with her father William in the raising of her younger brothers, including her new infant brother Marshall. Sonora Smart married John Bruce Dodd (1870–1945), one of the original founders of Ball & Dodd Funeral Home, and had a son, John Bruce "Jack" Dodd, born in 1909.

== Father's Day ==
Though a Father's Day service was held on July 5, 1908, in West Virginia to honor the fathers killed in the Monongah Mine Disaster, it is Sonora Smart Dodd who is credited as the founder of the official American national holiday.

Smart held her father in great esteem. While hearing a church sermon about the newly recognized Mother's Day at Central Methodist Episcopal Church, Sonora felt strongly that fatherhood needed recognition as well. She approached the Spokane Ministerial Alliance and suggested her own father's birthday, of June 5, as the day of honor for fathers. The Alliance chose the third Sunday in June instead.

The first Father's Day was celebrated June 19, 1910, in Spokane, Washington. Although observance of the holiday faded in the 1920s, over time, the idea of Father's Day became popular and embraced across the nation. In 1916, President Woodrow Wilson sent a telegraph to Spokane praising Father's Day services. William Jennings Bryan was another early admirer of the observance. In 1966, President Lyndon B. Johnson signed a presidential proclamation declaring the third Sunday of June as Father's Day. In 1972, President Nixon established a permanent national observance of Father's Day to be held on the 3rd Sunday of June each year.

Dodd was honored at Expo '74, the World's Fair, in Spokane in 1974. She died four years later at the age of ninety-six, and was buried in Greenwood Memorial Terrace in Spokane.

== Other work ==
Besides her advocacy for Father's Day, Dodd was also active in the Spokane chapter of the Woman's Christian Temperance Union.

In the 1920s, Dodd spent some time away from Spokane, studying at the School of the Art Institute of Chicago, painting, writing poetry, and working in fashion design in Hollywood.

== See also ==
- Grace Golden Clayton
