= Grandparents' Day =

Celebration honoring grandparents

- Observed by: Various countries
- Type: International
- Date: Various
- Frequency: annual

Grandparents' Day or National Grandparents' Day is a secular holiday celebrated in various countries; it is celebrated to show the bond between grandparents and grandchildren. It occurs on various days of the year, either as one holiday or sometimes as a separate Grandmother's Day and Grandfather's Day. It was celebrated for the first time in Poland in 1965.

== Celebrations worldwide ==
=== Bangladesh ===
In Bangladesh, the National Grandparents Day is celebrated on 9 September to honor and express gratitude towards their constant love, care, and support.

=== Brazil ===
In Brazil, Grandparents' Day (Portuguese: Dia dos avós) is celebrated on July 26.

=== Canada ===
National Grandparents' Day (French: Journée Nationale des Grands-parents) began in Canada in 1995. Motion number 273 submitted in the House of Commons by Sarkis Assadourian in 1995 read:

That, in the opinion of this House, the government should consider designating the second Sunday in September of each year as Grandparents' Day in order to acknowledge their importance to the structure of the family in the nurturing, upbringing and education of children.

=== Estonia ===
In Estonia, Grandparents' Day (Vanavanemate päev) is celebrated on the second Sunday in September.

=== France ===
In France, Grandmothers' Day (La fête des grands-mères) was launched in 1987 by a brand of coffee (Café Grand'Mère), part of the Kraft Jacobs Suchard Group. The date is now included in French calendars and is celebrated on the first Sunday in March.

=== Germany ===
In Germany, Grandmothers' Day was established in 2010 and is celebrated on the second Sunday in October.

=== Holy See ===
In 2021, Pope Francis declared World Day for Grandparents and the Elderly, to take place annually on the fourth Sunday of July, neighboring the memorial of Sts. Joachim and Anne, the grandparents of Jesus.

The Dicastery for Laity, Family and Life promotes two ways for Catholics to celebrate. The first is by celebrating Mass for the grandparents and the elderly. The second is to visit those who are alone. A plenary indulgence is granted for those who participate in either of these activities.

=== Hong Kong ===
Junior Chamber International Victoria introduced the first Grandparents' Day in Hong Kong in 1990. It is celebrated on the second Sunday in October.

=== Italy ===
In Italy, Grandparents' Day (officially Festa Nazionale dei Nonni, "National Grandparents' Feast") was established in 2005 and is celebrated on October 2, Guardian Angels' Day in the Roman Catholic Church.

=== Japan ===
In Japan, Respect for the Aged Day (敬老の日, Keiro-no-hi) was established as National Holiday in 1966, is one of the national holidays of Japan and is celebrated on the third Monday of September.

=== Malta ===
The Republic of Malta celebrates 'Grandparents Day' annually on the second Sunday of October since 2013. It was created by Philip Michael Chircop, founder of the Grandparents Malta Foundation (VO/0869), and made official through a decree by the Maltese Parliament in 2014. Chircop has been an advocate for grandparents' visitation rights, and received a Medal for Service to the Republic in 2021 for his efforts.

Malta also participates in the World Day for Grandparents and the Elderly declared in 2021 by Vatican.

=== Mexico ===
In Mexico, Grandparents' Day (Spanish: Día de los Abuelos) is celebrated on August 28.

=== Netherlands ===
In the Netherlands, Opa en Oma Dag was created in 2004 and falls on June 4. It is not widely celebrated and to many people in the Netherlands it is completely unknown. The day was envisioned as a day for grandparents and great-grandparents to spend time in enjoyable activities with their (great-)grandchildren, in order to strengthen the bond between the generations and to increase respect and appreciation for senior citizens in general. One idea that has been promoted is the "adoption" of a grandmother or grandfather - for the day, or for life.

=== Philippines ===
In the Philippines, Grandparents' Day is celebrated on the second Sunday of September. The country started celebrating this event in 1987.

Grandparents' Day in the Philippines is also a family day. Many commercial establishments organize special events and give special privileges for the elderly people: free concerts, meal discounts, free medical checkups, flowers, etc.

=== Poland ===
In Poland, "Grandma's Day" (Polish: Dzień Babci) was created in 1964 by the Kobieta i Życie magazine, and popularized from 1965 onwards. It is celebrated on January 21. "Grandpa's Day" (Polish: Dzień Dziadka) is celebrated a day later, on January 22.

=== Portugal ===
In Portugal, Grandparents' Day (Portuguese: Dia dos avós) is celebrated on July 26.

=== Russia ===
Russia celebrates Grandparents' Day on October 28. Grandparents' Day was first celebrated by the ancient Slavs. The day was intended to consolidate people's connection with their ancestors, and bring together all generations.

=== Singapore ===
Singapore started celebrating Grandparents' Day in 1979, a year after the U.S. started. It is celebrated on the fourth Sunday in November.

=== South Sudan ===
South Sudan started celebrating Grandparents' Day in 2013, with the date set as the second Sunday in November.

=== Spain ===
In Spain, Grandparents' Day (Spanish: Día de los abuelos y las abuelas) is celebrated on July 26, the feast day of Saint Joachim and Saint Anne, parents of Mary, the mother of Jesus.

=== Taiwan ===
The Taiwanese Ministry of Education initiated Grandparents' Day (祖父母節, Zǔfùmǔ Jié) in Taiwan on 29 August 2010, on the fourth Sunday in August annually, shortly before school children would start a new schoolyear.

=== United Kingdom ===
The day was introduced to the UK in 1990 by the charity Age Concern but it has not been widely accepted by the British public. It has been celebrated on the first Sunday in October since 2008.

=== United States ===
In the United States, Grandparents' Day falls on the first (or second) Sunday of September following Labor Day (celebrated on the first Monday of September). Thus, the date changes from early to mid-September.

In the United States, Russell Capper (age 9 in 1969) sent a letter to President Nixon suggesting a special day be set aside as Grandparents' Day. On June 12, 1969, he received a letter back from Rose Mary Woods (Personal Secretary to the President) reading, "Dear Russell, Thank you for your letter to President Nixon. Your suggestion regarding a Grandparent’s Day is appreciated, but the President ordinarily issues proclamations designating periods for special observance only when a Congressional resolution authorizes him to do so. With best wishes, Sincerely, Rose Mary Woods Personal Secretary to the President".

Since the aforementioned letter, Marian McQuade, a West Virginia housewife, was recognized nationally by the United States Senate – in particular by Senators Jennings Randolph and Robert Byrd – and by President Jimmy Carter, as the founder of National Grandparents Day. McQuade made it her goal to educate the youth in the community about the important contributions seniors have made throughout history. She also urged the youth to "adopt" a grandparent, not just for one day a year, but rather for a lifetime. Co-founder Cynthia Bennett, who worked for Marian's husband, contributed by writing letters of verification.

In 1973, then-Senator Jennings Randolph, D-WV, introduced a resolution to the Senate to make Grandparents' Day a national holiday. West Virginia's Governor Arch Moore had proclaimed an annual Grandparents' Day for the state, at the urging of Marian McQuade. When Senator Randolph's resolution in the U.S. Senate died in committee, Marian McQuade organized supporters and began contacting governors, senators, and congressmen in all fifty states. She urged each state to proclaim their own Grandparents' Day. Within three years, she had received Grandparents' Day proclamations from forty-three states. She sent copies of the proclamations to Senator Randolph.

In February 1977, Senator Randolph, with the concurrence of many other senators, introduced a joint resolution to the senate requesting the president to "issue annually a proclamation designating the first Sunday of September after Labor Day of each year as 'National Grandparents' Day'." Congress passed the legislation proclaiming the first Sunday after Labor Day as National Grandparents' Day and, on August 3, 1978, then-President Jimmy Carter signed the proclamation. The statute cites the day's purpose: "...to honor grandparents, to give grandparents an opportunity to show love for their children's children, and to help children become aware of strength, information, and guidance older people can offer".

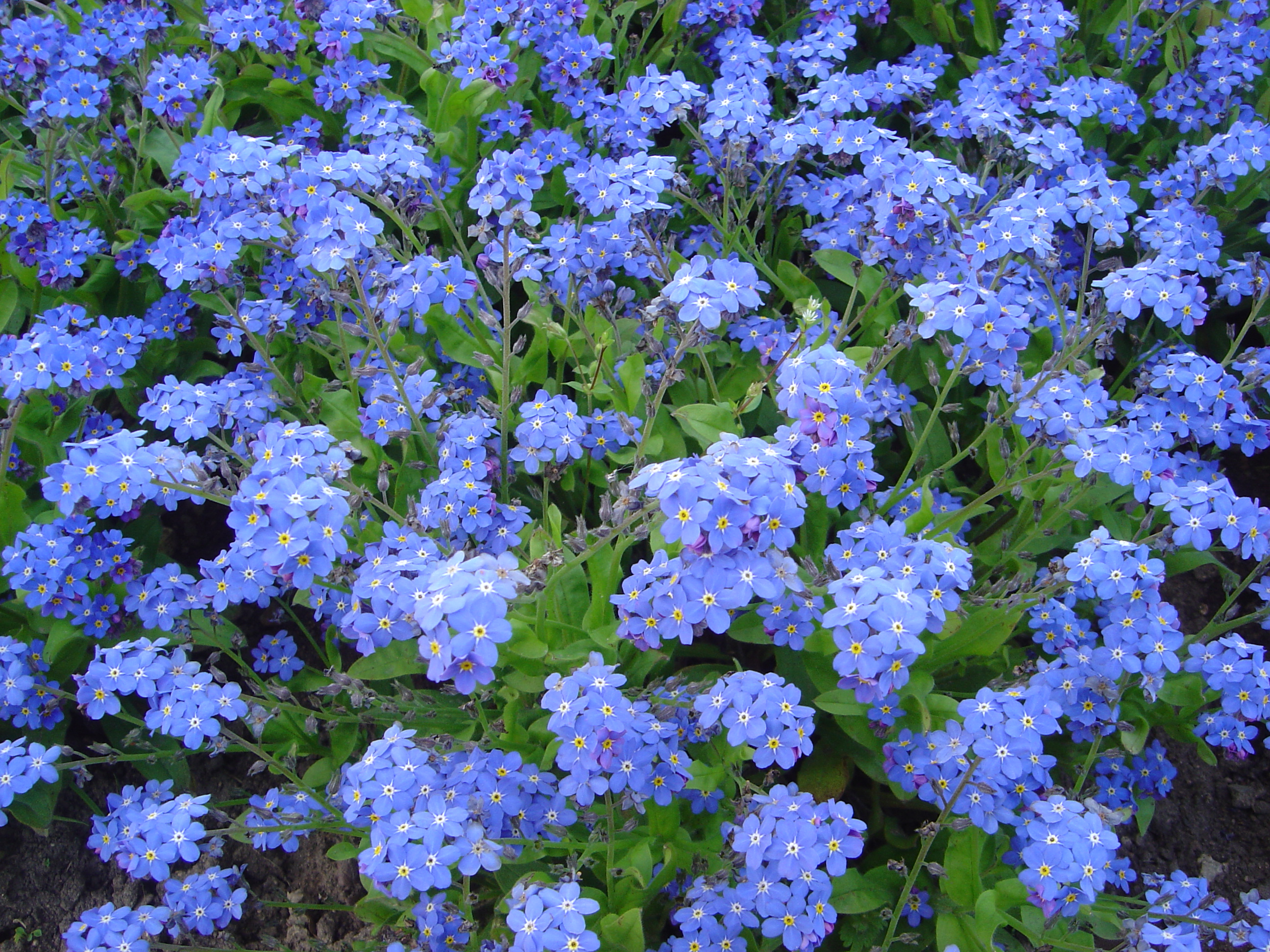
Forget-me-not

The flower of the U.S. National Grandparents Day is the forget-me-not which blooms in the spring. As a result, seasonal flowers are given in appreciation to grandparents on this day.

== See also ==
- Father's Day
- Mother's Day
