= 2024 West Virginia House of Delegates election =

2024 West Virginia House of Delegates elections
- November 5, 2024

All 100 seats in the West Virginia House of Delegates 51 seats needed for a majority
	Majority party	Minority party
	GOP	DEM
Leader	Roger Hanshaw	Sean Hornbuckle
Party	Republican	Democratic
Leader since	August 29, 2018	August 8, 2023
Leader's seat	62nd district	25th district
Last election	88 seats, 68.7%	12 seats, 30.1%
Seats before	89	11
Seats after	91	9
Seat change	▲2	▼2
- Republican gain Republican hold Democratic hold 50–60% 60–70% 70–80% 80–90% >90% 50–60% 70–80% >90%
Speaker before election
Roger Hanshaw
Republican
Elected Speaker
Roger Hanshaw
Republican

The 2024 West Virginia House of Delegates elections were on November 5, 2024, alongside elections to the presidency, governorship, U.S. Senate, U.S. House of Representatives, and other offices. Primary elections were held on May 14, 2024.

== Background ==
Following the 2022 legislative races and party changes in both chambers of the legislature, Democratic presence in state government has been reduced to a historically small level. This has come after roughly a decade of change in the composition of the state government, with the legislature beginning the 2010s with decisive Democratic majorities and ending the decade with Republican ones. This change has been characterized by Democratic to Republican party switches among legislators and other officials, and increasing margins of victory for Republicans over time, as ancestrally Democratic-leaning regions and demographics shift towards the GOP.

In the 2020 Presidential Election, Republican Donald Trump won 94 House of Delegates Districts, and Joe Biden won 6. There are 5 districts that voted for Trump in 2020 which are represented by Democrats going into the 2024 West Virginia House of Delegates Elections: District 5 in Ohio County (Trump + 12% ) District 27 in Cabell County (Trump + 28% ); District 52 in Kanawha County (Trump + 21% ); District 56 in Kanawha County (Trump + 10% ); and District 76 in Marion County (Trump + 15% ).

Biden 50–60% 60–70% / Trump 50–60% 60–70% 70–80% 80–90%

== Retiring incumbents ==
=== Democrats ===
1. District 27: Ric Griffith is retiring to run for State Senate.
2. District 52: Larry L. Rowe is retiring.
3. District 76: Joey Garcia is retiring to run for State Senate.

=== Republicans ===
1. District 16: Steve Westfall is retiring to run for Jackson County Commission.
2. District 20: Geoff Foster is retiring.
3. District 47: Todd Longanacre is retiring.
4. District 51: Tom Fast is retiring to run for Fayette County Circuit Court.
5. District 53: Chris Pritt is retiring to run for State Senate.
6. District 66: Ty Nestor is retiring to run for Randolph County Circuit Court.
7. District 73: Amy Summers is retiring.
8. District 82: Debbie Warner is retiring.
9. District 96: Eric Householder is retiring to run for State Auditor.
10. District 97: John Hardy is retiring to run for Berkeley County Commission.

== Incumbents defeated ==
=== In primary election ===
Four incumbent representatives, all Republicans, were defeated in the May 14 primary election.

==== Republicans ====
1. District 4: Diana Winzenreid lost nomination to a full term to Bill Flanigan.
2. District 30: David Adkins lost renomination to Jeff Eldridge.
3. District 49: Heather Tully lost renomination to Stanley Adkins.
4. District 91: Don Forsht lost renomination to Joseph de Soto.

== Predictions ==
Source	Ranking	As of
CNalysis	Solid R	March 19, 2024

== Appointments ==
According to §3-10-5 of West Virginia Code, vacancies in the House of Delegates are filled through appointment by the Governor of one of three candidates chosen by the executive committee of the outgoing member's party. Below is a list of appointments made during the 86th Legislature.

District	Incumbent		Party	Appointee		Ref.
District	Departing Member	First elected	Party	Incoming Member	Appt. Date	Ref.
4	Erikka Storch	2010	Rep	Diana Winzenreid	June 5, 2023	
6	Charlie Reynolds	2020	Rep	Jeffrey Stephens	October 26, 2023	
15	Riley Keaton	2020	Rep	Erica Moore	October 31, 2023	
28	Mark Ross	2022	Rep	Ryan Browning	July 2, 2024	
36	Anita Hall	2022	Rep	Stephen "David" Green	January 29, 2024	
44	Todd Kirby	2022	Rep	Carl "Bill" Roop	July 16, 2024	
46	Michael Honaker	2021 (appointed)	Rep	Jeff Campbell	September 13, 2023	
48	Caleb Hanna	2018	Rep	Tom Clark	January 12, 2024	
55	Moore Capito	2016	Rep	JB Akers	January 9, 2024	
57	Doug Skaff	2008; 2014 (retired); 2018	Dem	Hollis Lewis	September 19, 2023	
81	Danielle Walker	2018	Dem	Anitra Hamilton	April 27, 2023	
98	Paul Espinosa	2012	Rep	Joe Funkhouser	October 16, 2024	

== Overview ==
2024 West Virginia House of Delegates election results
Party	Races	Seats	Aggregate votes		2022 general		Change	
Party	Races	Seats	No.	Percent	Seats	%	Seats	%
Republican	98	91	533,240	77.48%	89	68.68%	+2	+8.80%
Democratic	58	9	152,468	22.15%	11	30.10%	−2	−7.95%
Constitution	1	0	1,860	0.27%	DNC		—	
Independent	1	0	399	0.06%	0	0.35%	—	−0.29%
Libertarian	1	0	288	0.04%	0	0.12%	—	−0.08%
Totals	159	100	688,255	100%	—	100	100	—

=== Close races ===
Districts where the margin of victory was under 10%:

1. District 76, 1.94%
2. District 56, 3.84%
3. District 100, 6.76%
4. District 82, 7.88%
5. District 97, 8.32%
6. District 67, 9.08%
7. District 57, 9.86%

== Summary of results ==
Italics denote an open seat held by the incumbent party; bold text denotes a gain for a party.

State House District	Incumbent			Elected Delegate		
State House District	Member	Party	First elected	Member	Party	Outcome
1	Pat McGeehan	Republican	2016	Pat McGeehan	Republican	Rep Hold
2	Mark Zatezalo	Republican	2020	Mark Zatezalo	Republican	Rep Hold
3	Jimmy Willis	Republican	2022	Jimmy Willis	Republican	Rep Hold
4	Diana Winzenreid	Republican	2023	Bill Flanigan	Republican	Rep Hold
5	Shawn Fluharty	Democratic	2014	Shawn Fluharty	Democratic	Dem Hold
6	Jeffrey Stephens	Republican	2023	Jeffrey Stephens	Republican	Rep Hold
7	Charles Sheedy	Republican	2022	Charles Sheedy	Republican	Rep Hold
8	David Kelly	Republican	2018	David Kelly	Republican	Rep Hold
9	Trenton Barnhart	Republican	2019	Trenton Barnhart	Republican	Rep Hold
10	Bill Anderson	Republican	1992	Bill Anderson	Republican	Rep Hold
11	Bob Fehrenbacher	Republican	2022	Bob Fehrenbacher	Republican	Rep Hold
12	Vernon Criss	Republican	2016	Vernon Criss	Republican	Rep Hold
13	Scot Heckert	Republican	2022	Scot Heckert	Republican	Rep Hold
14	Dave Foggin	Republican	2022	Dave Foggin	Republican	Rep Hold
15	Erica Moore	Republican	2023	Erica Moore	Republican	Rep Hold
16	Steve Westfall	Republican	2012	Frederick "Happy Joe" Parsons	Republican	Rep Hold
17	Jonathan Pinson	Republican	2020	Jonathan Pinson	Republican	Rep Hold
18	Jim Butler	Republican	2022	Jim Butler	Republican	Rep Hold
19	Kathie Hess Crouse	Republican	2021	Kathie Hess Crouse	Republican	Rep Hold
20	Geoff Foster	Republican	2014	Sarah Drennan	Republican	Rep Hold
21	Jarred Cannon	Republican	2022	Jarred Cannon	Republican	Rep Hold
22	Daniel Linville	Republican	2018	Daniel Linville	Republican	Rep Hold
23	Evan Worrell	Republican	2018	Evan Worrell	Republican	Rep Hold
24	Patrick Lucas	Republican	2022	Patrick Lucas	Republican	Rep Hold
25	Sean Hornbuckle	Democratic	2014	Sean Hornbuckle	Democratic	Dem Hold
26	Matthew Rohrbach	Republican	2014	Matthew Rohrbach	Republican	Rep Hold
27	Ric Griffith	Democratic	2020	**Michael D. Amos**	Republican	**Rep Gain**
28	Ryan Browning	Republican	2024	Ryan Browning	Republican	Rep Hold
29	Henry Dillon	Republican	2022	Henry Dillon	Republican	Rep Hold
30	David Adkins	Republican	2022	Jeff Eldridge	Republican	Rep Hold
31	Margitta Mazzocchi	Republican	2020	Margitta Mazzocchi	Republican	Rep Hold
32	Josh Holstein	Republican	2020	Josh Holstein	Republican	Rep Hold
33	Jordan Bridges	Republican	2020	Jordan Bridges	Republican	Rep Hold
34	Mark Dean	Republican	2016	Mark Dean	Republican	Rep Hold
35	Adam Vance	Republican	2022	Adam Vance	Republican	Rep Hold
36	David Green	Republican	2024	David Green	Republican	Rep Hold
37	Marty Gearheart	Republican	2020	Marty Gearheart	Republican	Rep Hold
38	Joe Ellington	Republican	2010	Joe Ellington	Republican	Rep Hold
39	Doug Smith	Republican	2020	Doug Smith	Republican	Rep Hold
40	Roy Cooper	Republican	2012	Roy Cooper	Republican	Rep Hold
41	Jordan Maynor	Republican	2021	Jordan Maynor	Republican	Rep Hold
42	Brandon Steele	Republican	2018	Brandon Steele	Republican	Rep Hold
43	Chris Toney	Republican	2018	Chris Toney	Republican	Rep Hold
44	Bill Roop	Republican	2024	Bill Roop	Republican	Rep Hold
45	Eric Brooks	Republican	2022	Eric Brooks	Republican	Rep Hold
46	Jeff Campbell	Republican	2023	Jeff Campbell	Republican	Rep Hold
47	Todd Longanacre	Republican	2020	Ray Canterbury	Republican	Rep Hold
48	Tom Clark	Republican	2024	Tom Clark	Republican	Rep Hold
49	Heather Tully	Republican	2020	Stanley S. Adkins	Republican	Rep Hold
50	Elliott Pritt	Republican	2022	Elliott Pritt	Republican	Rep Hold
51	Tom Fast	Republican	2014	Marshall W. Clay	Republican	Rep Hold
52	Larry Rowe	Democratic	2014	**Tresa Howell**	Republican	**Rep Gain**
53	Chris Pritt	Republican	2020	Tristan Leavitt	Republican	Rep Hold
54	Mike Pushkin	Democratic	2014	Mike Pushkin	Democratic	Dem Hold
55	JB Akers	Republican	2024	JB Akers	Republican	Rep Hold
56	Kayla Young	Democratic	2020	Kayla Young	Democratic	Dem Hold
57	Hollis Lewis	Democratic	2023	Hollis Lewis	Democratic	Dem Hold
58	Walter Hall	Republican	2022	Walter Hall	Republican	Rep Hold
59	Andy Shamblin	Republican	2022	Andy Shamblin	Republican	Rep Hold
60	Dana Ferrell	Republican	2020	Dana Ferrell	Republican	Rep Hold
61	Dean Jeffries	Republican	2018	Dean Jeffries	Republican	Rep Hold
62	Roger Hanshaw	Republican	2014	Roger Hanshaw	Republican	Rep Hold
63	Lori Dittman	Republican	2022	Lori Dittman	Republican	Rep Hold
64	Adam Burkhammer	Republican	2020	Adam Burkhammer	Republican	Rep Hold
65	Carl Martin	Republican	2018	Carl Martin	Republican	Rep Hold
66	Ty Nestor	Republican	2020	Jonathan B. Kyle	Republican	Rep Hold
67	Elias Coop-Gonzalez	Republican	2022	Elias Coop-Gonzalez	Republican	Rep Hold
68	Chris Phillips	Republican	2018	Chris Phillips	Republican	Rep Hold
69	Keith Marple	Republican	2022	Keith Marple	Republican	Rep Hold
70	Mickey Petitto	Republican	2022	Mickey Petitto	Republican	Rep Hold
71	Laura Kimble	Republican	2020	Laura Kimble	Republican	Rep Hold
72	Clay Riley	Republican	2020	Clay Riley	Republican	Rep Hold
73	Amy Summers	Republican	2014	Bryan Smith	Republican	Rep Hold
74	Mike DeVault	Republican	2022	Mike DeVault	Republican	Rep Hold
75	Phil Mallow	Republican	2020	Phil Mallow	Republican	Rep Hold
76	Joey Garcia	Democratic	2020	Rick Garcia	Democratic	Dem Hold
77	Joe Statler	Republican	2020	Joe Statler	Republican	Rep Hold
78	Geno Chiarelli	Republican	2022	Geno Chiarelli	Republican	Rep Hold
79	Evan Hansen	Democratic	2018	Evan Hansen	Democratic	Dem Hold
80	John Williams	Democratic	2016	John Williams	Democratic	Dem Hold
81	Anitra Hamilton	Democratic	2023	Anitra Hamilton	Democratic	Dem Hold
82	Debbie Warner	Republican	2022	David McCormick	Republican	Rep Hold
83	George Street	Republican	2022	George Street	Republican	Rep Hold
84	D. Rolland Jennings	Republican	2017	D. Rolland Jennings	Republican	Rep Hold
85	John Paul Hott	Republican	2018	John Paul Hott	Republican	Rep Hold
86	Bryan Ward	Republican	2020	Bryan Ward	Republican	Rep Hold
87	Gary Howell	Republican	2010	Gary Howell	Republican	Rep Hold
88	Rick Hillenbrand	Republican	2022	Rick Hillenbrand	Republican	Rep Hold
89	Darren Thorne	Republican	2022	Darren Thorne	Republican	Rep Hold
90	George Miller	Republican	2020	George Miller	Republican	Rep Hold
91	Don Forsht	Republican	2020	Joseph de Soto	Republican	Rep Hold
92	Michael Hite	Republican	2022	Michael Hite	Republican	Rep Hold
93	Michael Hornby	Republican	2022	Michael Hornby	Republican	Rep Hold
94	Larry Kump	Republican	2022	Larry Kump	Republican	Rep Hold
95	Chuck Horst	Republican	2020	Chuck Horst	Republican	Rep Hold
96	Eric Householder	Republican	2010	Lisa White	Republican	Rep Hold
97	John Hardy	Republican	2018	S. Chris Anders	Republican	Rep Hold
98	Joe Funkhouser	Republican	2024	Joe Funkhouser	Republican	Rep Hold
99	Wayne Clark	Republican	2020	Wayne Clark	Republican	Rep Hold
100	William Ridenour	Republican	2022	William Ridenour	Republican	Rep Hold

== List of districts ==
=== District 1 ===
Incumbent Pat McGeehan was first elected in 2014.

Republican primary results
Party	Candidate	Votes	%
Republican	Pat McGeehan (incumbent)	2,255	100.0
Total votes		2,255	100.0

==== General election ====
West Virginia's 1st House of Delegates district, 2024
Party	Candidate	Votes	%
Republican	Pat McGeehan (incumbent)	7,689	100%
Total votes		7,689	100.0

=== District 2 ===
Incumbent Mark Zatezalo was first elected in 2014, left the House of Delegates in 2018, and was elected again in 2020.

Republican primary results
Party	Candidate	Votes	%
Republican	Mark Zatezalo (incumbent)	1,124	63.3
Republican	Michele Slates	651	36.7
Total votes		1,775	100.0

Democratic primary results
Party	Candidate	Votes	%
Democratic	Olivia Dowler	1,058	100.0
Total votes		1,058	100.0

==== General election ====
===== Predictions =====
Source	Ranking	As of
CNalysis	Solid R	August 4, 2024

===== Results =====
West Virginia's 2nd House of Delegates district, 2024
Party	Candidate	Votes	%
Republican	Mark Zatezalo (incumbent)	5,206	68.25%
Democratic	Olivia Dowler	2,422	31.75%
Total votes		7,628	100.0

=== District 3 ===
Incumbent Jimmy Willis was first elected in 2022.

Republican primary results
Party	Candidate	Votes	%
Republican	Jimmy Willis (incumbent)	1,784	100.0
Total votes		1,784	100.0

Democratic primary results
Party	Candidate	Votes	%
Democratic	David Cantrell	1,187	100.0
Total votes		1,187	100.0

==== General election ====
===== Predictions =====
Source	Ranking	As of
CNalysis	Very Likely R	August 4, 2024

===== Results =====
West Virginia's 3rd House of Delegates district, 2024
Party	Candidate	Votes	%
Republican	Jimmy Willis (incumbent)	5,128	68.83%
Democratic	David Cantrell	2,322	31.17%
Total votes		7,450	100.0

=== District 4 ===
Incumbent Diana Winzenreid was appointed in 2023. She lost renomination to challenger Bill Flanigan.

Republican primary results
Party	Candidate	Votes	%
Republican	Bill Flanigan	1,714	61.2
Republican	Diana Winzenreid (incumbent)	1,086	38.8
Total votes		2,800	100.0

Democratic primary results
Party	Candidate	Votes	%
Democratic	Jonathan Haught	1,487	100.0
Total votes		1,487	100.0

==== General election ====
===== Predictions =====
Source	Ranking	As of
CNalysis	Solid R	August 4, 2024

===== Results =====
West Virginia's 4th House of Delegates district, 2024
Party	Candidate	Votes	%
Republican	Bill Flanigan	5,991	65.95%
Democratic	Jonathan Haught	3,093	34.05%
Total votes		9,084	100.0

=== District 5 ===
Incumbent Shawn Fluharty was first elected in 2014.

Republican primary results
Party	Candidate	Votes	%
Republican	Thomas Salkovick	1,711	100.0
Total votes		1,711	100.0

Democratic primary results
Party	Candidate	Votes	%
Democratic	Shawn Fluharty (incumbent)	2,014	100.0
Total votes		2,014	100.0

==== General election ====
===== Predictions =====
Source	Ranking	As of
CNalysis	Likely D	August 4, 2024

=== Results ===
West Virginia's 5th House of Delegates district, 2024
Party	Candidate	Votes	%
Democratic	Shawn Fluharty (incumbent)	4,135	57.28%
Republican	Thomas Salkovick	3,084	42.72%
Total votes		7,219	100.0

=== District 6 ===
Incumbent Jeffrey Stephens was appointed in 2023.

Republican primary results
Party	Candidate	Votes	%
Republican	Jeffrey Stephens (incumbent)	1,222	50.7
Republican	Jason Padlow	1,189	49.3
Total votes		2,411	100.0

==== General election ====
West Virginia's 6th House of Delegates district, 2024
Party	Candidate	Votes	%
Republican	Jeffrey Stephens (incumbent)		
Total votes			100.0

=== District 7 ===
Incumbent Charles Sheedy was first elected in 2022.

Republican primary results
Party	Candidate	Votes	%
Republican	Charles Sheedy (incumbent)	2,073	100.0
Total votes		2,073	100.0

Democratic primary results
Party	Candidate	Votes	%
Democratic	Devon Tennant	1,093	100.0
Total votes		1,093	100.0

==== General election ====
===== Predictions =====
Source	Ranking	As of
CNalysis	Very Likely R	August 4, 2024

===== Results =====
West Virginia's 7th House of Delegates district, 2024
Party	Candidate	Votes	%
Republican	Charles Sheedy (incumbent)	5,106	67.76%
Democratic	Devon Tennant	2,429	32.24%
Total votes		7,535	100.0

=== District 8 ===
Incumbent David Kelly was first elected in 2018.

Republican primary results
Party	Candidate	Votes	%
Republican	David Kelly (incumbent)	2,238	73.8
Republican	Dave Shelton	794	26.2
Total votes		3,032	100.0

==== General election ====
West Virginia's 8th House of Delegates district, 2024
Party	Candidate	Votes	%
Republican	David Kelly (incumbent)	6,537	100%
Total votes		6,537	100.0

=== District 9 ===
Incumbent Trenton Barnhart was first appointed in 2019.

Republican primary results
Party	Candidate	Votes	%
Republican	Trenton Barnhart (incumbent)	2,992	100.0
Total votes		2,992	100.0

==== General election ====
West Virginia's 9th House of Delegates district, 2024
Party	Candidate	Votes	%
Republican	Trenton Barnhart (incumbent)	7,475	100%
Total votes		7,475	100.0

=== District 10 ===
Incumbent Bill Anderson was first elected in 1992.

Republican primary results
Party	Candidate	Votes	%
Republican	Bill Anderson (incumbent)	2,180	100.0
Total votes		2,180	100.0

==== General election ====
West Virginia's 10th House of Delegates district, 2024
Party	Candidate	Votes	%
Republican	Bill Anderson (incumbent)	7,020	100%
Total votes		7,020	100.0

=== District 11 ===
Incumbent Bob Fehrenbacher was first elected in 2022.

Republican primary results
Party	Candidate	Votes	%
Republican	Bob Fehrenbacher (incumbent)	2,034	100.0
Total votes		2,034	100.0

==== General election ====
West Virginia's 11th House of Delegates district, 2024
Party	Candidate	Votes	%
Republican	Bob Fehrenbacher (incumbent)	6,272	100%
Total votes		6,272	100.0

=== District 12 ===
Incumbent Vernon Criss was first elected in 2016.

Republican primary results
Party	Candidate	Votes	%
Republican	Vernon Criss (incumbent)	1,407	100.0
Total votes		1,407	100.0

==== General election ====
West Virginia's 12th House of Delegates district, 2024
Party	Candidate	Votes	%
Republican	Vernon Criss (incumbent)	4,847	100%
Total votes		4,847	100.0

=== District 13 ===
Incumbent Scot Heckert was first elected in 2022.

Republican primary results
Party	Candidate	Votes	%
Republican	Scot Heckert (incumbent)	1,759	100.0
Total votes		1,759	100.0

==== General election ====
West Virginia's 13th House of Delegates district, 2024
Party	Candidate	Votes	%
Republican	Scot Heckert (incumbent)	5,883	100%
Total votes		5,883	100.0

=== District 14 ===
Incumbent Dave Foggin was first elected in 2022.

Republican primary results
Party	Candidate	Votes	%
Republican	Dave Foggin (incumbent)	2,471	100.0
Total votes		2,471	100.0

Democratic primary results
Party	Candidate	Votes	%
Democratic	Jim Marion	613	100.0
Total votes		613	100.0

==== General election ====
===== Predictions =====
Source	Ranking	As of
CNalysis	Solid R	August 4, 2024

===== Results =====
West Virginia's 14th House of Delegates district, 2024
Party	Candidate	Votes	%
Republican	Dave Foggin (incumbent)	6,146	76.52%
Democratic	Jim Marion	1,886	23.48%
Total votes		8,032	100.0

=== District 15 ===
Incumbent Erica Moore was appointed in 2023.

Republican primary results
Party	Candidate	Votes	%
Republican	Erica Moore (incumbent)	1,802	64.7
Republican	Martin Atkinson	985	35.3
Total votes		2,787	100.0

Democratic primary results
Party	Candidate	Votes	%
Democratic	JuliAnna Penfold	774	100.0
Total votes		774	100.0

==== General election ====
===== Predictions =====
Source	Ranking	As of
CNalysis	Solid R	August 4, 2024

===== Results =====
West Virginia's 15th House of Delegates district, 2024
Party	Candidate	Votes	%
Republican	Erica Moore (incumbent)	8,032	82.04%
Democratic	JuliAnna Penfold	1,285	17.96%
Total votes		7,154	100.0

=== District 16 ===
Incumbent Steve Westfall was first elected in 2012. He is retiring.

Republican primary results
Party	Candidate	Votes	%
Republican	Frederick Parsons	1,597	47.9
Republican	Randy Halstead	1,066	32.0
Republican	Trey R. Jones	672	20.1
Total votes		3,335	100.0

==== General election ====
West Virginia's 16th House of Delegates district, 2024
Party	Candidate	Votes	%
Republican	Frederick Parsons	7,482	
Total votes		7,482	100.0

=== District 17 ===
Incumbent Jonathan Pinson was first elected in 2020.

Republican primary results
Party	Candidate	Votes	%
Republican	Jonathan Pinson (incumbent)	1,997	77.6
Republican	Adam Roush	576	22.4
Total votes		2,573	100.0

==== General election ====
West Virginia's 17th House of Delegates district, 2024
Party	Candidate	Votes	%
Republican	Jonathan Pinson (incumbent)	6,639	100%
Total votes		6,639	100.0

=== District 18 ===
Incumbent Jim Butler was first elected in 2022.

Republican primary results
Party	Candidate	Votes	%
Republican	Jim Butler (incumbent)	2,033	100.0
Total votes		2,033	100.0

Democratic primary results
Party	Candidate	Votes	%
Democratic	Andrea Meadows	763	100.0
Total votes		763	100.0

==== General election ====
===== Predictions =====
Source	Ranking	As of
CNalysis	Solid R	August 4, 2024

===== Results =====
West Virginia's 18th House of Delegates district, 2024
Party	Candidate	Votes	%
Republican	Jim Butler (incumbent)	5,023	71.71%
Democratic	Andrea Meadows	1,982	28.29%
Total votes		7,005	100.0

=== District 19 ===
Incumbent Kathie Hess Crouse was first appointed in 2021.

Republican primary results
Party	Candidate	Votes	%
Republican	Kathie Hess Crouse (incumbent)	1,403	53.2
Republican	Debbie Deweese	1,232	46.8
Total votes		2,635	100.0

==== General election ====
West Virginia's 19th House of Delegates district, 2024
Party	Candidate	Votes	%
Republican	Kathie Hess Crouse (incumbent)	6,560	100%
Total votes		6,560	100.0

=== District 20 ===
Incumbent Geoff Foster was first elected in 2014. He is retiring.

Republican primary results
Party	Candidate	Votes	%
Republican	Sarah Drennan	1,731	52.9
Republican	Jacob Losh	1,539	47.1
Total votes		3,270	100.0

Democratic primary results
Party	Candidate	Votes	%
Democratic	Steve Patrick	822	100.0
Total votes		822	100.0

==== General election ====
===== Predictions =====
Source	Ranking	As of
CNalysis	Solid R	August 4, 2024

===== Results =====
West Virginia's 20th House of Delegates district, 2024
Party	Candidate	Votes	%
Republican	Sarah Drennan	6,617	71.63%
Democratic	Steve Patrick	2,621	28.37%
Total votes		9,238	100.0

=== District 21 ===
Incumbent Jarred Cannon was first appointed in 2022.

Republican primary results
Party	Candidate	Votes	%
Republican	Jarred Cannon (incumbent)	2,281	100.0
Total votes		2,281	100.0

Democratic primary results
Party	Candidate	Votes	%
Democratic	Michael Mosteller II	757	100.0
Total votes		757	100.0

==== General election ====
===== Predictions =====
Source	Ranking	As of
CNalysis	Solid R	August 4, 2024

===== Results =====
West Virginia's 21st House of Delegates district, 2024
Party	Candidate	Votes	%
Republican	Jarred Cannon (incumbent)	5,865	68.99%
Democratic	Michael Mosteller II	2,636	31.01%
Total votes		8,501	100.0

=== District 22 ===
Incumbent Daniel Linville was first elected in 2020.

Republican primary results
Party	Candidate	Votes	%
Republican	Daniel Linville (incumbent)	1,183	51.0
Republican	Aaron Holley	1,137	49.0
Total votes		2,320	100.0

==== General election ====
West Virginia's 22nd House of Delegates district, 2024
Party	Candidate	Votes	%
Republican	Daniel Linville (incumbent)	6,091	100%
Total votes		6,091	100.0

=== District 23 ===
Incumbent Evan Worrell was first elected in 2018.

Republican primary results
Party	Candidate	Votes	%
Republican	Evan Worrell (incumbent)	1,856	100.0
Total votes		1,856	100.0

Democratic primary results
Party	Candidate	Votes	%
Democratic	Amanda Beth Beach-Burge	762	100.0
Total votes		762	100.0

==== General election ====
===== Predictions =====
Source	Ranking	As of
CNalysis	Solid R	August 4, 2024

===== Results =====
West Virginia's 23rd House of Delegates district, 2024
Party	Candidate	Votes	%
Republican	Evan Worrell (incumbent)	5,170	75.55%
Democratic	Amanda Beth Beach-Burge	1,673	24.45%
Total votes		6,843	100.0

=== District 24 ===
Incumbent Patrick Lucas was first elected in 2022.

Republican primary results
Party	Candidate	Votes	%
Republican	Patrick Lucas (incumbent)	1,188	100.0
Total votes		1,188	100.0

Democratic primary results
Party	Candidate	Votes	%
Democratic	Billy Wray	898	100.0
Total votes		898	100.0

==== General election ====
===== Predictions =====
Source	Ranking	As of
CNalysis	Tilt R	August 4, 2024

===== Results =====
West Virginia's 24th House of Delegates district, 2024
Party	Candidate	Votes	%
Republican	Patrick Lucas (incumbent)	3,134	57.13%
Democratic	Billy Wray	2,352	42.87%
Total votes		5,486	100.0

=== District 25 ===
Incumbent Sean Hornbuckle was first elected in 2014.

Republican primary results
Party	Candidate	Votes	%
Republican	Connie Beaty	564	100.0
Total votes		564	100.0

Democratic primary results
Party	Candidate	Votes	%
Democratic	Sean Hornbuckle (incumbent)	1,354	100.0
Total votes		1,354	100.0

==== General election ====
===== Predictions =====
Source	Ranking	As of
CNalysis	Very Likely D	August 4, 2024

===== Results =====
West Virginia's 25th House of Delegates district, 2024
Party	Candidate	Votes	%
Democratic	Sean Hornbuckle (incumbent)	3,699	74.35%
Republican	Connie Beaty	1,276	25.65%
Total votes		4,975	100.0

=== District 26 ===
Incumbent Matthew Rohrbach was first elected in 2014.

Republican primary results
Party	Candidate	Votes	%
Republican	Matthew Rohrbach (incumbent)	1,846	100.0
Total votes		1,846	100.0

==== General election ====
West Virginia's 26th House of Delegates district, 2024
Party	Candidate	Votes	%
Republican	Matthew Rohrbach (incumbent)	6,046	100%
Total votes		6,046	100.0

=== District 27 ===
Incumbent Ric Griffith was first elected in 2020. He is retiring.

Republican primary results
Party	Candidate	Votes	%
Republican	Michael D. Amos	820	55.3
Republican	Jeff Maynard	664	44.7
Total votes		1,484	100.0

Democratic primary results
Party	Candidate	Votes	%
Democratic	Gina Milum	943	100.0
Total votes		943	100.0

Libertarian primary results
Party	Candidate	Votes	%
Libertarian	Craig Carpenter II	18	100.0
Total votes		18	100.0

==== General election ====
===== Predictions =====
Source	Ranking	As of
CNalysis	Very Likely R (flip)	August 4, 2024

===== Results =====
West Virginia's 27th House of Delegates district, 2024
Party	Candidate	Votes	%
Democratic	Gina Milum	1,910	31.36%
Republican	Michael D. Amos	3,892	63.91%
Libertarian	Craig Carpenter II	288	4.73%
Total votes		6,090	100.0

=== District 28 ===
Incumbent Ryan Browning was appointed in 2024.

Republican primary results
Party	Candidate	Votes	%
Republican	Ryan Browning	957	43.1
Republican	Samantha Stephens	827	37.3
Republican	Jason Stephens	434	19.6
Total votes		2,218	100.0

==== General election ====
West Virginia's 28th House of Delegates district, 2024
Party	Candidate	Votes	%
Republican	Ryan Browning (incumbent)	6,126	98.2
Write-in		115	1.8
Total votes		6,241	100.0

=== District 29 ===
Incumbent Henry Dillon was first elected in 2022.

Republican primary results
Party	Candidate	Votes	%
Republican	Henry Dillon (incumbent)	1,160	66.5
Republican	Nate Randolph	584	33.5
Total votes		1,744	100.0

Democratic primary results
Party	Candidate	Votes	%
Democratic	Wayne Bug Williamson	938	100.0
Total votes		938	100.0

==== General election ====
===== Predictions =====
Source	Ranking	As of
CNalysis	Solid R	August 4, 2024

===== Results =====
West Virginia's 29th House of Delegates district, 2024
Party	Candidate	Votes	%
Republican	Henry Dillon (incumbent)	3,397	60.78%
Democratic	Wayne Bug Williamson	2,192	39.22%
Total votes		5,589	100.0

=== District 30 ===
Incumbent David Adkins was first elected in 2022.

Republican primary results
Party	Candidate	Votes	%
Republican	Jeff Eldridge	1,311	53.3
Republican	David Adkins (incumbent)	1,150	46.7
Total votes		2,461	100.0

Democratic primary results
Party	Candidate	Votes	%
Democratic	Britney Brogan	736	100.0
Total votes		736	100.0

==== General election ====
===== Predictions =====
Source	Ranking	As of
CNalysis	Solid R	August 4, 2024

===== Results =====
West Virginia's 30th House of Delegates district, 2024
Party	Candidate	Votes	%
Republican	Jeff Eldridge	4,533	72.22%
Democratic	Britney Brogan	1,744	27.78%
Total votes		6,277	100.0

=== District 31 ===
Incumbent Margitta Mazzocchi was first elected in 2020.

Republican primary results
Party	Candidate	Votes	%
Republican	Margitta Mazzocchi (incumbent)	1,539	100.0
Total votes		1,539	100.0

==== General election ====
West Virginia's 31st House of Delegates district, 2024
Party	Candidate	Votes	%
Republican	Margitta Mazzocchi (incumbent)	5,265	100%
Total votes		5,265	100.0

=== District 32 ===
Incumbent Josh Holstein was first elected in 2020.

Republican primary results
Party	Candidate	Votes	%
Republican	Josh Holstein (incumbent)	1,569	100.0
Total votes		1,569	100.0

Democratic primary results
Party	Candidate	Votes	%
Democratic	April D. Estep	1,294	100.0
Total votes		1,294	100.0

==== General election ====
===== Predictions =====
Source	Ranking	As of
CNalysis	Likely R	August 4, 2024

===== Results =====
West Virginia's 32nd House of Delegates district, 2024
Party	Candidate	Votes	%
Republican	Josh Holstein (incumbent)	4,909	73.24%
Democratic	April D. Estep	1,794	26.76%
Total votes		6,703	100.0

=== District 33 ===
Incumbent Jordan Bridges was first elected in 2020.

Republican primary results
Party	Candidate	Votes	%
Republican	Jordan Bridges (incumbent)	1,468	100.0
Total votes		1,468	100.0

Democratic primary results
Party	Candidate	Votes	%
Democratic	George Howes	772	100.0
Total votes		772	100.0

==== General election ====
===== Predictions =====
Source	Ranking	As of
CNalysis	Solid R	August 4, 2024

===== Results =====
West Virginia's 33rd House of Delegates district, 2024
Party	Candidate	Votes	%
Republican	Jordan Bridges (incumbent)		
Democratic	George Howes		
Total votes			100.0

=== District 34 ===
Incumbent Mark Dean was first elected in 2016.

Republican primary results
Party	Candidate	Votes	%
Republican	Mark Dean (incumbent)	1,107	44.3
Republican	John White	875	35.0
Republican	Gavin Dillon	515	20.6
Total votes		2,497	100.0

==== General election ====
West Virginia's 34th House of Delegates district, 2024
Party	Candidate	Votes	%
Republican	Mark Dean (incumbent)	5,383	100%
Total votes		5,383	100.0

=== District 35 ===
Incumbent Adam Vance was first elected in 2022.

Republican primary results
Party	Candidate	Votes	%
Republican	Adam Vance (incumbent)	1,830	100.0
Total votes		1,830	100.0

==== General election ====
West Virginia's 35th House of Delegates district, 2024
Party	Candidate	Votes	%
Republican	Adam Vance (incumbent)	5,579	100%
Total votes		5,579	100.0

=== District 36 ===
Incumbent Stephen Green was appointed in 2024.

Republican primary results
Party	Candidate	Votes	%
Republican	Stephen Green (incumbent)	960	100.0
Total votes		960	100.0

Democratic primary results
Party	Candidate	Votes	%
Democratic	Tiffany Clemins	825	100.0
Total votes		825	100.0

==== General election ====
===== Predictions =====
Source	Ranking	As of
CNalysis	Very Likely R	August 4, 2024

===== Results =====
West Virginia's 36th House of Delegates district, 2024
Party	Candidate	Votes	%
Republican	Stephen Green (incumbent)	3,668	74.09%
Democratic	Tiffany Clemins	1,283	25.91%
Total votes		4,951	100.0

=== District 37 ===
Incumbent Marty Gearheart was first elected in 2020.

Republican primary results
Party	Candidate	Votes	%
Republican	Marty Gearheart (incumbent)	1,598	100.0
Total votes		1,598	100.0

Democratic primary results
Party	Candidate	Votes	%
Democratic	Polla McClellan Rumberg	654	100.0
Total votes		654	100.0

==== General election ====
===== Predictions =====
Source	Ranking	As of
CNalysis	Solid R	August 4, 2024

===== Results =====
West Virginia's 37th House of Delegates district, 2024
Party	Candidate	Votes	%
Republican	Marty Gearheart (incumbent)	4,851	73.85%
Democratic	Polla McClellan Rumberg	1,718	26.15%
Total votes		6,569	100.0

=== District 38 ===
Incumbent Joe Ellington was first elected in 2010.

Republican primary results
Party	Candidate	Votes	%
Republican	Joe Ellington (incumbent)	2,021	100.0
Total votes		2,021	100.0

Democratic primary results
Party	Candidate	Votes	%
Democratic	Randa D. Faulkner	718	100.0
Total votes		718	100.0

==== General election ====
===== Predictions =====
Source	Ranking	As of
CNalysis	Solid R	August 4, 2024

===== Results =====
West Virginia's 38th House of Delegates district, 2024
Party	Candidate	Votes	%
Republican	Joe Ellington (incumbent)	5,410	75.23%
Democratic	Randa D. Faulkner	1,781	24.77%
Total votes		7,191	100.0

=== District 39 ===
Incumbent Doug Smith was first elected in 2020.

Republican primary results
Party	Candidate	Votes	%
Republican	Doug Smith (incumbent)	2,224	100.0
Total votes		2,224	100.0

Democratic primary results
Party	Candidate	Votes	%
Democratic	Neal Vestal	630	100.0
Total votes		630	100.0

==== General election ====
===== Predictions =====
Source	Ranking	As of
CNalysis	Solid R	August 4, 2024

===== Results =====
West Virginia's 39th House of Delegates district, 2024
Party	Candidate	Votes	%
Republican	Doug Smith (incumbent)	5,958	81.22%
Democratic	Neal Vestal	1,378	18.78%
Total votes		7,336	100.0

=== District 40 ===
Incumbent Roy Cooper was first elected in 2012.

Republican primary results
Party	Candidate	Votes	%
Republican	Roy Cooper (incumbent)	1,818	63.5
Republican	Jonathon Fain	1,047	36.5
Total votes		2,865	100.0

Democratic primary results
Party	Candidate	Votes	%
Democratic	James W. McNeely	1,106	100.0
Total votes		1,106	100.0

==== General election ====
===== Predictions =====
Source	Ranking	As of
CNalysis	Solid R	August 4, 2024

===== Results =====
West Virginia's 40th House of Delegates district, 2024
Party	Candidate	Votes	%
Republican	Roy Cooper (incumbent)	6,178	72.79%
Democratic	James W. McNeely	2,310	27.21%
Total votes		8,488	100.0

=== District 41 ===
Incumbent Jordan Maynor was first appointed in 2021.

Republican primary results
Party	Candidate	Votes	%
Republican	Jordan Maynor (incumbent)	2,684	100.0
Total votes		2,684	100.0

Democratic primary results
Party	Candidate	Votes	%
Democratic	Anna White Ferraraccio	780	100.0
Total votes		780	100.0

==== General election ====
===== Predictions =====
Source	Ranking	As of
CNalysis	Solid R	August 4, 2024

===== Results =====
West Virginia's 41st House of Delegates district, 2024
Party	Candidate	Votes	%
Republican	Jordan Maynor (incumbent)	6,960	79.01%
Democratic	Anna White Ferraraccio	1,849	20.99%
Total votes		8,809	100.0

=== District 42 ===
Incumbent Brandon Steele was first elected in 2018.

Republican primary results
Party	Candidate	Votes	%
Republican	Brandon Steele (incumbent)	2,357	100.0
Total votes		2,357	100.0

Democratic primary results
Party	Candidate	Votes	%
Democratic	Addam Gibson	692	100.0
Total votes		692	100.0

==== General election ====
===== Predictions =====
Source	Ranking	As of
CNalysis	Solid R	August 4, 2024

===== Results =====
West Virginia's 42nd House of Delegates district, 2024
Party	Candidate	Votes	%
Republican	Brandon Steele (incumbent)	5,929	77%
Democratic	Addam Gibson	1,771	23%
Total votes		7,700	100.0

=== District 43 ===
Incumbent Christopher Toney was first elected in 2018.

Republican primary results
Party	Candidate	Votes	%
Republican	Christopher Toney (incumbent)	2,076	100.0
Total votes		2,076	100.0

==== General election ====
West Virginia's 43rd House of Delegates district, 2024
Party	Candidate	Votes	%
Republican	Christopher Toney (incumbent)	6,365	100%
Total votes		6,365	100.0

=== District 44 ===
Incumbent Carl "Bill" Roop was appointed in 2024.

Republican primary results
Party	Candidate	Votes	%
Republican	Carl "Bill" Roop	1,727	100.0
Total votes		1,727	100.0

Democratic primary results
Party	Candidate	Votes	%
Democratic	Tony O. Martin	1,285	100.0
Total votes		1,285	100.0

==== General election ====
===== Predictions =====
Source	Ranking	As of
CNalysis	Likely R	August 4, 2024

===== Results =====
West Virginia's 44th House of Delegates district, 2024
Party	Candidate	Votes	%
Republican	Carl "Bill" Roop (incumbent)	3,883	57.11%
Democratic	Tony O. Martin	2,916	42.89%
Total votes		6,799	100.0

=== District 45 ===
Incumbent Eric Brooks was first elected in 2022.

Republican primary results
Party	Candidate	Votes	%
Republican	Eric Brooks (incumbent)	1,535	100.0
Total votes		1,535	100.0

==== General election ====
West Virginia's 45th House of Delegates district, 2024
Party	Candidate	Votes	%
Republican	Eric Brooks (incumbent)	4,991	100%
Total votes		4,991	100.0

=== District 46 ===
Incumbent Jeff Campbell was appointed in 2023. He previously served in the House of Delegates from 2017 to 2020.

Republican primary results
Party	Candidate	Votes	%
Republican	Jeff Campbell (incumbent)	1,429	52.9
Republican	Trey Ewing	820	30.4
Republican	Thomas Perkins	452	16.7
Total votes		2,701	100.0

Democratic primary results
Party	Candidate	Votes	%
Democratic	Paul Detch	1,142	100.0
Total votes		1,142	100.0

==== General election ====
===== Predictions =====
Source	Ranking	As of
CNalysis	Solid R	August 4, 2024

West Virginia's 46th House of Delegates district, 2024
Party	Candidate	Votes	%
Republican	Jeff Campbell (incumbent)	5,714	71.13%
Democratic	Paul Detch	2,319	28.87%
Total votes		8,033	100.0

=== District 47 ===
Incumbent Todd Longanacre was first elected in 2020. He is retiring.

Republican primary results
Party	Candidate	Votes	%
Republican	Ray Canterbury	952	39.0
Republican	George Ambler	797	32.7
Republican	Stephen Snyder	691	28.3
Total votes		2,440	100.0

Democratic primary results
Party	Candidate	Votes	%
Democratic	Kayla McCoy	709	60.0
Democratic	Roger Vannoy	473	40.0
Total votes		1,182	100.0

==== General election ====
===== Predictions =====
Source	Ranking	As of
CNalysis	Solid R	August 4, 2024

===== Results =====
West Virginia's 47th House of Delegates district, 2024
Party	Candidate	Votes	%
Republican	Ray Canterbury	5,516	71.42%
Democratic	Kayla McCoy	2,207	28.58%
Total votes		7,723	100.0

=== District 48 ===
Incumbent Tom Clark was appointed in 2024.

Republican primary results
Party	Candidate	Votes	%
Republican	Tom Clark (incumbent)	1,792	100.0
Total votes		1,792	100.0

Democratic primary results
Party	Candidate	Votes	%
Democratic	Devin Spinks	883	100.0
Total votes		883	100.0

==== General election ====
===== Predictions =====
Source	Ranking	As of
CNalysis	Solid R	May 9, 2024

===== Results =====
West Virginia's 48th House of Delegates district, 2024
Party	Candidate	Votes	%
Republican	Tom Clark (incumbent)	4,546	75.44%
Democratic	Devin Spinks	1,480	24.56%
Total votes		6,026	100.0

=== District 49 ===
Incumbent Heather Tully was first appointed in 2020. She lost renomination to challenger Stanley Adkins.

Republican primary results
Party	Candidate	Votes	%
Republican	Stanley Adkins	1,569	53.6
Republican	Heather Tully (incumbent)	1,359	46.4
Total votes		2,928	100.0

Democratic primary results
Party	Candidate	Votes	%
Democratic	Jean Nutter	832	100.0
Total votes		832	100.0

==== General election ====
===== Predictions =====
Source	Ranking	As of
CNalysis	Solid R	May 9, 2024

===== Results =====
West Virginia's 49th House of Delegates district, 2024
Party	Candidate	Votes	%
Republican	Stanley Adkins	5,290	76.38%
Democratic	Jean Nutter	1,636	23.62%
Total votes		6,926	100.0

=== District 50 ===
Incumbent Elliott Pritt was first elected in 2022.

Republican primary results
Party	Candidate	Votes	%
Republican	Elliott Pritt (incumbent)	1,222	100.0
Total votes		1,222	100.0

Democratic primary results
Party	Candidate	Votes	%
Democratic	Jerry L. Allen	865	100.0
Total votes		865	100.0

==== General election ====
===== Predictions =====
Source	Ranking	As of
CNalysis	Likely R	August 4, 2024

===== Results =====
West Virginia's 50th House of Delegates district, 2024
Party	Candidate	Votes	%
Republican	Elliott Pritt (incumbent)	3,928	66.42%
Democratic	Jerry L. Allen	1,587	26.83%
Independent	Scotty Bowman	399	6.75%
Total votes		5,914	100.0

=== District 51 ===
Incumbent Tom Fast was first elected in 2020. He is retiring.

Republican primary results
Party	Candidate	Votes	%
Republican	Marshall W. Clay	1,144	52.4
Republican	Dan Hill	1,038	47.6
Total votes		2,182	100.0

Democratic primary results
Party	Candidate	Votes	%
Democratic	Robyn Kincaid	625	52.6
Democratic	Jack Thompson	563	47.4
Total votes		1,188	100.0

==== General election ====
===== Predictions =====
Source	Ranking	As of
CNalysis	Solid R	August 4, 2024

===== Results =====
West Virginia's 51st House of Delegates district, 2024
Party	Candidate	Votes	%
Republican	Marshall W. Clay	4,882	67.08%
Democratic	Robyn Kincaid	2,396	32.92%
Total votes		7,278	100.0

=== District 52 ===
Incumbent Larry Rowe was first elected in 1996, before leaving the chamber and returning in 2014. He did not file for re-election.

Republican primary results
Party	Candidate	Votes	%
Republican	Tresa Howell	840	63.1
Republican	Greg Ingram	492	36.9
Total votes		1,332	100.0

Democratic primary results
Party	Candidate	Votes	%
Democratic	Thomas Jones	1,129	100.0
Total votes		1,129	100.0

==== General election ====
===== Predictions =====
Source	Ranking	As of
CNalysis	Likely R (flip)	August 4, 2024

===== Results =====
West Virginia's 52nd House of Delegates district, 2024
Party	Candidate	Votes	%
Democratic	Thomas Jones	2,694	39.72%
Republican	Tresa Howell	4,088	60.28%
Total votes		6,782	100.0

=== District 53 ===
Incumbent Chris Pritt was first elected in 2020. He is retiring.

Republican primary results
Party	Candidate	Votes	%
Republican	Tristan Leavitt	943	60.0
Republican	Terry Burns	628	40.0
Total votes		1,571	100.0

Democratic primary results
Party	Candidate	Votes	%
Democratic	Chris Smith	886	100.0
Total votes		886	100.0

==== General election ====
===== Predictions =====
Source	Ranking	As of
CNalysis	Very Likely R	August 4, 2024

===== Results =====
West Virginia's 53rd House of Delegates district, 2024
Party	Candidate	Votes	%
Republican	Tristan Leavitt	3,893	59.89%
Democratic	Chris Smith	2,607	40.11%
Total votes		6,500	100.0

=== District 54 ===
Incumbent Mike Pushkin was first elected in 2014.

Republican primary results
Party	Candidate	Votes	%
Republican	Julien Aklei	646	100.0
Total votes		646	100.0

Democratic primary results
Party	Candidate	Votes	%
Democratic	Mike Pushkin (incumbent)	1,667	100.0
Total votes		1,667	100.0

==== General election ====
===== Predictions =====
Source	Ranking	As of
CNalysis	Solid D	August 4, 2024

===== Results =====
West Virginia's 54th House of Delegates district, 2024
Party	Candidate	Votes	%
Democratic	Mike Pushkin (incumbent)	4,611	74.89%
Republican	Julien Aklei	1,546	25.11%
Total votes		6,157	100.0

=== District 55 ===
Incumbent JB Akers was appointed in 2024.

Republican primary results
Party	Candidate	Votes	%
Republican	JB Akers	2,034	100.0
Total votes		2,034	100.0

Democratic primary results
Party	Candidate	Votes	%
Democratic	Linda Bodie	1,219	100.0
Total votes		1,219	100.0

==== General election ====
===== Predictions =====
Source	Ranking	As of
CNalysis	Tilt R	August 4, 2024

===== Results =====
West Virginia's 55th House of Delegates district, 2024
Party	Candidate	Votes	%
Republican	JB Akers	4,926	59.75%
Democratic	Linda Bodie	3,319	40.25%
Total votes		8,245	100.0

=== District 56 ===
Incumbent Kayla Young was first elected in 2020.

Republican primary results
Party	Candidate	Votes	%
Republican	Andrew Anderson	1,636	100.0
Total votes		1,636	100.0

Democratic primary results
Party	Candidate	Votes	%
Democratic	Kayla Young (incumbent)	1,332	100.0
Total votes		1,332	100.0

==== General election ====
===== Predictions =====
Source	Ranking	As of
CNalysis	Tossup	May 9, 2024

===== Results =====
West Virginia's 56th House of Delegates district, 2024
Party	Candidate	Votes	%
Democratic	Kayla Young (incumbent)	4,198	51.92%
Republican	Andrew G. Anderson	3,887	48.08%
Total votes		8,085	100.0

=== District 57 ===
Incumbent Hollis Lewis was appointed in 2023.

Republican primary results
Party	Candidate	Votes	%
Republican	Mark Carter	597	40.8
Republican	Ernest Blevins	482	32.9
Republican	Aaron Neil	385	26.3
Total votes		1,464	100.0

Democratic primary results
Party	Candidate	Votes	%
Democratic	Hollis Lewis (incumbent)	1,343	100.0
Total votes		1,343	100.0

==== General election ====
===== Predictions =====
Source	Ranking	As of
CNalysis	Likely D	August 4, 2024

===== Results =====
West Virginia's 57th House of Delegates district, 2024
Party	Candidate	Votes	%
Democratic	Hollis Lewis (incumbent)	4,006	54.93%
Republican	Mark Carter	3,287	45.07%
Total votes		7,293	100.0

=== District 58 ===
Incumbent Walter Hall was first elected in 2022.

Republican primary results
Party	Candidate	Votes	%
Republican	Walter Hall (incumbent)	1,830	100.0
Total votes		1,830	100.0

==== General election ====
West Virginia's 58th House of Delegates district, 2024
Party	Candidate	Votes	%
Republican	Walter Hall (incumbent)	5,842	100%
Total votes		5,842	100.0

=== District 59 ===
Incumbent Andy Shamblin was first elected in 2022.

Republican primary results
Party	Candidate	Votes	%
Republican	Andy Shamblin (incumbent)	1,404	100.0
Total votes		1,404	100.0

==== General election ====
West Virginia's 59th House of Delegates district, 2024
Party	Candidate	Votes	%
Republican	Andy Shamblin (incumbent)	5,636	100%
Total votes		5,636	100.0

=== District 60 ===
Incumbent Dana Ferrell was first elected in 2020.

Republican primary results
Party	Candidate	Votes	%
Republican	Dana Ferrell (incumbent)	1,761	100.0
Total votes		1,761	100.0

==== General election ====
West Virginia's 60th House of Delegates district, 2024
Party	Candidate	Votes	%
Republican	Dana Ferrell (incumbent)	6,346	100%
Total votes		6,346	100.0

=== District 61 ===
Incumbent Dean Jeffries was first elected in 2018.

Republican primary results
Party	Candidate	Votes	%
Republican	Dean Jeffries (incumbent)	2,134	100.0
Total votes		2,134	100.0

==== General election ====
West Virginia's 61st House of Delegates district, 2024
Party	Candidate	Votes	%
Republican	Dean Jeffries (incumbent)	6,328	100%
Total votes		6,328	100.0

=== District 62 ===
Incumbent Roger Hanshaw was first elected in 2014.

Republican primary results
Party	Candidate	Votes	%
Republican	Roger Hanshaw (incumbent)	1,805	71.5
Republican	Justin H. Bordas	397	15.7
Republican	Laura McGinnis	323	12.8
Total votes		2,525	100.0

==== General election ====
West Virginia's 62nd House of Delegates district, 2024
Party	Candidate	Votes	%
Republican	Roger Hanshaw (incumbent)	6,224	100%
Total votes		6,224	100.0

=== District 63 ===
Incumbent Lori Dittman was first elected in 2022.

Republican primary results
Party	Candidate	Votes	%
Republican	Lori Dittman (incumbent)	1,488	100.0
Total votes		1,488	100.0

==== General election ====
West Virginia's 63rd House of Delegates district, 2024
Party	Candidate	Votes	%
Republican	Lori Dittman (incumbent)	5,501	100%
Total votes		5,501	100.0

=== District 64 ===
Incumbent Adam Burkhammer was first elected in 2020.

Republican primary results
Party	Candidate	Votes	%
Republican	Adam Burkhammer (incumbent)	2,608	100.0
Total votes		2,608	100.0

==== General election ====
West Virginia's 64th House of Delegates district, 2024
Party	Candidate	Votes	%
Republican	Adam Burkhammer (incumbent)	6,474	100%
Total votes		6,474	100.0

=== District 65 ===
Incumbent Carl Martin was first elected in 2018.

Republican primary results
Party	Candidate	Votes	%
Republican	Carl Martin (incumbent)	2,658	100.0
Total votes		2,658	100.0

Democratic primary results
Party	Candidate	Votes	%
Democratic	Matthew Kerner	625	100.0
Total votes		625	100.0

==== General election ====
===== Predictions =====
Source	Ranking	As of
CNalysis	Solid R	August 4, 2024

===== Results =====
West Virginia's 65th House of Delegates district, 2024
Party	Candidate	Votes	%
Republican	Carl Martin (incumbent)	5,321	77.17%
Democratic	Matthew Kerner	1,574	22.83%
Total votes		6,895	100.0

=== District 66 ===
Incumbent Ty Nestor was first elected in 2020. He is retiring.

Republican primary results
Party	Candidate	Votes	%
Republican	Jonathan B. Kyle	1,712	100.0
Total votes		1,712	100.0

Democratic primary results
Party	Candidate	Votes	%
Democratic	Dama M. Nestor	990	100.0
Total votes		990	100.0

==== General election ====
===== Predictions =====
Source	Ranking	As of
CNalysis	Solid R	August 4, 2024

===== Results =====
West Virginia's 66th House of Delegates district, 2024
Party	Candidate	Votes	%
Republican	Jonathan B. Kyle	4,826	70.26%
Democratic	Dama M. Nestor	2,043	29.74%
Total votes		6,869	100.0

=== District 67 ===
Incumbent Elias Coop-Gonzalez was first elected in 2022.

Republican primary results
Party	Candidate	Votes	%
Republican	Elias Coop-Gonzalez (incumbent)	1,900	100.0
Total votes		1,900	100.0

Democratic primary results
Party	Candidate	Votes	%
Democratic	Cody Thompson	1,362	100.0
Total votes		1,362	100.0

==== General election ====
===== Predictions =====
Source	Ranking	As of
CNalysis	Very Likely R	August 4, 2024

===== Results =====
West Virginia's 67th House of Delegates district, 2024
Party	Candidate	Votes	%
Republican	Elias Coop-Gonzalez (incumbent)	4,358	54.54%
Democratic	Cody Thompson	3,632	45.46%
Total votes		7,990	100.0

=== District 68 ===
Incumbent Chris Phillips was first elected in 2018.

Republican primary results
Party	Candidate	Votes	%
Republican	Chris Phillips (incumbent)	2,107	67.4
Republican	David Critchfield	1,018	32.6
Total votes		3,125	100.0

==== General election ====
West Virginia's 68th House of Delegates district, 2024
Party	Candidate	Votes	%
Republican	Chris Phillips (incumbent)	6,286	100%
Total votes		6,286	100.0

=== District 69 ===
Incumbent Keith Marple was first elected in 2022.

Republican primary results
Party	Candidate	Votes	%
Republican	Keith Marple (incumbent)	1,601	57.4
Republican	Danny Hamrick	1,190	42.6
Total votes		2,791	100.0

==== General election ====
West Virginia's 69th House of Delegates district, 2024
Party	Candidate	Votes	%
Republican	Keith Marple (incumbent)	7,504	100%
Total votes		7,504	100.0

=== District 70 ===
Incumbent Mickey Petitto was first elected in 2022.

Republican primary results
Party	Candidate	Votes	%
Republican	Mickey Petitto (incumbent)	1,243	100.0
Total votes		1,243	100.0

Democratic primary results
Party	Candidate	Votes	%
Democratic	Morgan Earp	1,135	100.0
Total votes		1,135	100.0

==== General election ====
===== Predictions =====
Source	Ranking	As of
CNalysis	Lean R	August 4, 2024

===== Results =====
West Virginia's 70th House of Delegates district, 2024
Party	Candidate	Votes	%
Republican	Mickey Petitto (incumbent)	3,505	56.16%
Democratic	Shannon R Welsh	2,736	43.84%
Total votes		6,241	100.0

=== District 71 ===
Incumbent Laura Kimble was first elected in 2020.

Republican primary results
Party	Candidate	Votes	%
Republican	Laura Kimble (incumbent)	2,281	100.0
Total votes		2,281	100.0

==== General election ====
West Virginia's 71st House of Delegates district, 2024
Party	Candidate	Votes	%
Republican	Laura Kimble (incumbent)	7,201	100%
Total votes		7,201	100.0

=== District 72 ===
Incumbent Clay Riley was first elected in 2020.

Republican primary results
Party	Candidate	Votes	%
Republican	Clay Riley (incumbent)	1,812	100.0
Total votes		1,812	100.0

==== General election ====
West Virginia's 72nd House of Delegates district, 2024
Party	Candidate	Votes	%
Republican	Clay Riley (incumbent)	6,145	100%
Total votes		6,145	100.0

=== District 73 ===
Incumbent Amy Summers was elected in 2014. She is retiring.

Republican primary results
Party	Candidate	Votes	%
Republican	Bryan Smith	1,362	46.3
Republican	Fred Guidi	1,096	37.2
Republican	Richard A. Wolfe	485	16.5
Total votes		2,943	100.0

==== General election ====
West Virginia's 73rd House of Delegates district, 2024
Party	Candidate	Votes	%
Republican	Bryan Smith	6,710	100%
Total votes		6,710	100.0

=== District 74 ===
Incumbent Mike DeVault was first elected in 2022.

Republican primary results
Party	Candidate	Votes	%
Republican	Mike DeVault (incumbent)	2,164	100.0
Total votes		2,164	100.0

Democratic primary results
Party	Candidate	Votes	%
Democratic	Frankie Delapas	1,312	100.0
Total votes		1,312	100.0

==== General election ====
===== Predictions =====
Source	Ranking	As of
CNalysis	Solid R	August 4, 2024

===== Results =====
West Virginia's 74th House of Delegates district, 2024
Party	Candidate	Votes	%
Republican	Mike DeVault (incumbent)	6,023	72.05%
Democratic	Frankie Delapas	2,337	27.95%
Total votes		8,360	100.0

=== District 75 ===
Incumbent Phil Mallow was first elected in 2020.

Republican primary results
Party	Candidate	Votes	%
Republican	Phil Mallow (incumbent)	1,123	56.7
Republican	David Kennedy	858	43.3
Total votes		1,981	100.0

Democratic primary results
Party	Candidate	Votes	%
Democratic	Stephanie Tomana	1,588	100.0
Total votes		1,588	100.0

==== General election ====
===== Predictions =====
Source	Ranking	As of
CNalysis	Likely R	August 4, 2024

===== Results =====
West Virginia's 75th House of Delegates district, 2024
Party	Candidate	Votes	%
Republican	Phil Mallow (incumbent)	4,467	55.66%
Democratic	Stephanie Tomana	3,558	44.34%
Total votes		8,025	100.0

=== District 76 ===
Incumbent Joey Garcia was first elected in 2020. He is retiring.

Republican primary results
Party	Candidate	Votes	%
Republican	Jon Dodds	841	53.1
Republican	Toby Heaney	742	46.9
Total votes		1,583	100.0

Democratic primary results
Party	Candidate	Votes	%
Democratic	Rick Garcia	1,086	66.9
Democratic	Tom Mainella	536	33.1
Total votes		1,622	100.0

==== General election ====
===== Predictions =====
Source	Ranking	As of
CNalysis	Tilt R (flip)	October 7, 2024

===== Results =====
West Virginia's 76th House of Delegates district, 2024
Party	Candidate	Votes	%
Democratic	Rick Garcia	3,568	50.97%
Republican	Jon Dodds	3,432	49.03%
Total votes		7,000	100.0

=== District 77 ===
Incumbent Joe Statler was first elected in 2020.

Republican primary results
Party	Candidate	Votes	%
Republican	Joe Statler (incumbent)	1,892	100.0
Total votes		1,892	100.0

==== General election ====
West Virginia's 77th House of Delegates district, 2024
Party	Candidate	Votes	%
Republican	Joe Statler (incumbent)	6,984	100%
Total votes		6,984	100.0

=== District 78 ===
Incumbent Geno Chiarelli was first elected in 2022.

Republican primary results
Party	Candidate	Votes	%
Republican	Geno Chiarelli (incumbent)	1,603	100.0
Total votes		1,603	100.0

Democratic primary results
Party	Candidate	Votes	%
Democratic	Diane Market Gaston	1,227	100.0
Total votes		1,227	100.0

==== General election ====
===== Predictions =====
Source	Ranking	As of
CNalysis	Very Likely R	August 4, 2024

===== Results =====
West Virginia's 78th House of Delegates district, 2024
Party	Candidate	Votes	%
Republican	Geno Chiarelli (incumbent)	4,641	55.68%
Democratic	Diane Market Gaston	3,694	44.32%
Total votes		8,335	100.0

=== District 79 ===
Incumbent Evan Hansen was first elected in 2018.

Democratic primary results
Party	Candidate	Votes	%
Democratic	Evan Hansen (incumbent)	1,413	100.0
Total votes		1,413	100.0

==== General election ====
West Virginia's 79th House of Delegates district, 2024
Party	Candidate	Votes	%
Democratic	Evan Hansen (incumbent)	4,496	100%
Total votes		4,496	100.0

=== District 80 ===
Incumbent John Williams was first elected in 2016.

Republican primary results
Party	Candidate	Votes	%
Republican	Summer D. Hartley	876	100.0
Total votes		876	100.0

Democratic primary results
Party	Candidate	Votes	%
Democratic	John Williams (incumbent)	1,257	100.0
Total votes		1,257	100.0

==== General election ====
===== Predictions =====
Source	Ranking	As of
CNalysis	Solid D	August 4, 2024

===== Results =====
West Virginia's 80th House of Delegates district, 2024
Party	Candidate	Votes	%
Democratic	John Williams (incumbent)	3,283	58.76%
Republican	Summer D. Hartley	2,304	41.24%
Total votes		5,587	100.0

=== District 81 ===
Incumbent Anitra Hamilton was appointed in 2023.

Democratic primary results
Party	Candidate	Votes	%
Democratic	Anitra Hamilton (incumbent)	677	100.0
Total votes		677	100.0

==== General election ====
West Virginia's 81st House of Delegates district, 2024
Party	Candidate	Votes	%
Democratic	Anitra Hamilton (incumbent)	3,456	100%
Total votes		3,456	100.0

=== District 82 ===
Incumbent Debbie Warner was first elected in 2022. She is retiring.

Republican primary results
Party	Candidate	Votes	%
Republican	David McCormick	1,506	100.0
Total votes		1,506	100.0

Democratic primary results
Party	Candidate	Votes	%
Democratic	Bill Reger-Nash	753	60.2
Democratic	Mai-Lyn Sadler	497	39.8
Total votes		1,250	100.0

==== General election ====
===== Predictions =====
Source	Ranking	As of
CNalysis	Tilt D (flip)	August 4, 2024

===== Results =====
West Virginia's 82nd House of Delegates district, 2024
Party	Candidate	Votes	%
Republican	Dave McCormick	4,657	53.94%
Democratic	Bill Reger-Nash	3,976	46.06%
Total votes		8,633	100.0

=== District 83 ===
Incumbent George Street was first elected in 2022.

Republican primary results
Party	Candidate	Votes	%
Republican	George Street (incumbent)	2,181	100.0
Total votes		2,181	100.0

==== General election ====
West Virginia's 83rd House of Delegates district, 2024
Party	Candidate	Votes	%
Republican	George Street (incumbent)	5,910	100%
Total votes		5,910	100.0

=== District 84 ===
Incumbent D. Rolland Jennings was first elected in 2022.

Republican primary results
Party	Candidate	Votes	%
Republican	D. Rolland Jennings (incumbent)	1,688	54.1
Republican	Justin Hough	1,433	45.9
Total votes		3,121	100.0

==== General election ====
West Virginia's 84th House of Delegates district, 2024
Party	Candidate	Votes	%
Republican	D. Rolland Jennings (incumbent)	6,455	100%
Total votes		6,455	100.0

=== District 85 ===
Incumbent John Paul Hott was first elected in 2018.

Republican primary results
Party	Candidate	Votes	%
Republican	John Paul Hott (incumbent)	2,678	74.7
Republican	Anthony Prato	905	25.3
Total votes		3,583	100.0

==== General election ====
West Virginia's 85th House of Delegates district, 2024
Party	Candidate	Votes	%
Republican	John Paul Hott (incumbent)	7,403	100%
Total votes		7,403	100.0

=== District 86 ===
Incumbent Bryan Ward was first elected in 2020.

Republican primary results
Party	Candidate	Votes	%
Republican	Bryan Ward (incumbent)	1,724	100.0
Total votes		1,724	100.0

==== General election ====
West Virginia's 86th House of Delegates district, 2024
Party	Candidate	Votes	%
Republican	Bryan Ward (incumbent)	6,623	100%
Total votes		6,623	100.0

=== District 87 ===
Incumbent Gary Howell was first elected in 2010.

Republican primary results
Party	Candidate	Votes	%
Republican	Gary Howell (incumbent)	2,164	100.0
Total votes		2,164	100.0

==== General election ====
West Virginia's 87th House of Delegates district, 2024
Party	Candidate	Votes	%
Republican	Gary Howell (incumbent)	6,744	100%
Total votes		6,744	100.0

=== District 88 ===
Incumbent Rick Hillenbrand was first elected in 2022.

Republican primary results
Party	Candidate	Votes	%
Republican	Rick Hillenbrand (incumbent)	2,333	100.0
Total votes		2,333	100.0

Democratic primary results
Party	Candidate	Votes	%
Democratic	Amanda Vincent	562	100.0
Total votes		562	100.0

==== General election ====
===== Predictions =====
Source	Ranking	As of
CNalysis	Solid R	August 4, 2024

===== Results =====
West Virginia's 88th House of Delegates district, 2024
Party	Candidate	Votes	%
Republican	Rick Hillenbrand (incumbent)	6,176	78.46%
Democratic	Amanda Vincent	1,696	21.54%
Total votes		7,872	100.0

=== District 89 ===
Incumbent Darren Thorne was first elected in 2022.

Republican primary results
Party	Candidate	Votes	%
Republican	Darren Thorne (incumbent)	2,088	100.0
Total votes		2,088	100.0

Democratic primary results
Party	Candidate	Votes	%
Democratic	Alyson Reeves	484	100.0
Total votes		484	100.0

==== General election ====
===== Predictions =====
Source	Ranking	As of
CNalysis	Solid R	August 4, 2024

===== Results =====
West Virginia's 89th House of Delegates district, 2024
Party	Candidate	Votes	%
Republican	Darren Thorne (incumbent)	6,665	79.43%
Democratic	Alyson Reeves	1,726	20.57%
Total votes		8,391	100.0

=== District 90 ===
Incumbent George Miller was first elected in 2020.

Republican primary results
Party	Candidate	Votes	%
Republican	George Miller (incumbent)	2,271	74.7
Republican	Mike Riccio	767	25.3
Total votes		3,038	100.0

==== General election ====
West Virginia's 90th House of Delegates district, 2024
Party	Candidate	Votes	%
Republican	George Miller (incumbent)	8,712	100%
Total votes		8,712	100.0

=== District 91 ===
Incumbent Don Forsht was first elected in 2020. He lost renomination to challenger Joseph de Soto.

Republican primary results
Party	Candidate	Votes	%
Republican	Joseph de Soto	724	41.6
Republican	Tammy Hess	581	33.4
Republican	Don Forsht (incumbent)	435	25.0
Total votes		1,740	100.0

==== General election ====
West Virginia's 91st House of Delegates district, 2024
Party	Candidate	Votes	%
Republican	Joseph de Soto	5,974	76.26%
Constitution	Rick Thomson	1,860	23.74%
Total votes		7,834	100.0

=== District 92 ===
Incumbent Michael Hite was first elected in 2022.

Republican primary results
Party	Candidate	Votes	%
Republican	Michael Hite (incumbent)	1,795	100.0
Total votes		1,795	100.0

==== General election ====
West Virginia's 92nd House of Delegates district, 2024
Party	Candidate	Votes	%
Republican	Michael Hite (incumbent)	7,176	100%
Total votes		7,176	100.0

=== District 93 ===
Incumbent Michael Hornby was first elected in 2022.

Republican primary results
Party	Candidate	Votes	%
Republican	Michael Hornby (incumbent)	1,182	100.0
Total votes		1,182	100.0

==== General election ====
West Virginia's 93rd House of Delegates district, 2024
Party	Candidate	Votes	%
Republican	Michael Hornby (incumbent)	5,159	100%
Total votes		5,159	100.0

=== District 94 ===
Incumbent Larry Kump was first elected in 2022.

Republican primary results
Party	Candidate	Votes	%
Republican	Larry Kump (incumbent)	1,266	100.0
Total votes		1,266	100.0

==== General election ====
West Virginia's 94th House of Delegates district, 2024
Party	Candidate	Votes	%
Republican	Larry Kump (incumbent)	6,413	100%
Total votes		6,413	100.0

=== District 95 ===
Incumbent Chuck Horst was first elected in 2020.

Republican primary results
Party	Candidate	Votes	%
Republican	Chuck Horst (incumbent)	1,203	100.0
Total votes		1,203	100.0

Democratic primary results
Party	Candidate	Votes	%
Democratic	Debi Carroll	417	100.0
Total votes		417	100.0

==== General election ====
===== Predictions =====
Source	Ranking	As of
CNalysis	Solid R	August 4, 2024

===== Results =====
West Virginia's 95th House of Delegates district, 2024
Party	Candidate	Votes	%
Republican	Chuck Horst (incumbent)	4,877	67.38%
Democratic	Debi Carroll	2,361	32.62%
Total votes		7,238	100.0

=== District 96 ===
Incumbent Eric Householder was first elected in 2010. He is retiring.

Republican primary results
Party	Candidate	Votes	%
Republican	Lisa White	888	67.5
Republican	Tanner W. Rogers	428	32.5
Total votes		1,316	100.0

Democratic primary results
Party	Candidate	Votes	%
Democratic	Aniqua Lower	392	100.0
Total votes		392	100.0

==== General election ====
===== Predictions =====
Source	Ranking	As of
CNalysis	Solid R	August 4, 2024

===== Results =====
West Virginia's 96th House of Delegates district, 2024
Party	Candidate	Votes	%
Republican	Lisa White	5,383	71.05%
Democratic	Aniqua Lower	2,193	28.95%
Total votes		7,576	100.0

=== District 97 ===
Incumbent John Hardy was first elected in 2018. He is retiring.

Republican primary results
Party	Candidate	Votes	%
Republican	S. Chris Anders	949	61.0
Republican	Pam Brush	606	39.0
Total votes		1,555	100.0

Democratic primary results
Party	Candidate	Votes	%
Democratic	Lucia Valentine	900	100.0
Total votes		900	100.0

==== General election ====
===== Predictions =====
Source	Ranking	As of
CNalysis	Very Likely R	August 4, 2024

===== Results =====
West Virginia's 97th House of Delegates district, 2024
Party	Candidate	Votes	%
Republican	S. Chris Anders	4,594	54.16%
Democratic	Lucia Valentine	3,888	45.84%
Total votes		8,482	100.0

=== District 98 ===
Incumbent Joe Funkhouser was appointed in 2024.

Republican primary results
Party	Candidate	Votes	%
Republican	Joe Funkhouser	923	59.4
Republican	Barbara Fuller	631	40.6
Total votes		1,554	100.0

Democratic primary results
Party	Candidate	Votes	%
Democratic	Troy N. Miller	528	100.0
Total votes		528	100.0

==== General election ====
===== Predictions =====
Source	Ranking	As of
CNalysis	Solid R	August 4, 2024

===== Results =====
West Virginia's 98th House of Delegates district, 2024
Party	Candidate	Votes	%
Republican	Joe Funkhouser (incumbent)	5,136	65.99%
Democratic	Troy N. Miller	2,647	34.01%
Total votes		7,783	100.0

=== District 99 ===
Incumbent Wayne Clark was first elected in 2022.

Republican primary results
Party	Candidate	Votes	%
Republican	Wayne Clark (incumbent)	696	45.6
Republican	Daphne Andrews	576	37.8
Republican	Mike Allers Jr.	253	16.6
Total votes		1,525	100.0

Democratic primary results
Party	Candidate	Votes	%
Democratic	Osmund A. Anderson	655	100.0
Total votes		655	100.0

==== General election ====
===== Predictions =====
Source	Ranking	As of
CNalysis	Very Likely R	August 4, 2024

===== Results =====
West Virginia's 99th House of Delegates district, 2024
Party	Candidate	Votes	%
Republican	Wayne Clark (incumbent)	5,199	57.97%
Democratic	Osmund A. Anderson	3,770	42.03%
Total votes		8,969	100.0

=== District 100 ===
Incumbent William Ridenour was first elected in 2022.

Republican primary results
Party	Candidate	Votes	%
Republican	William Ridenour (incumbent)	1,548	100.0
Total votes		1,548	100.0

Democratic primary results
Party	Candidate	Votes	%
Democratic	Maria Russo	1,010	100.0
Total votes		1,010	100.0

==== General election ====
===== Predictions =====
Source	Ranking	As of
CNalysis	Tilt D (Flip)	October 28, 2024

===== Results =====
West Virginia's 100th House of Delegates district, 2024
Party	Candidate	Votes	%
Republican	William Ridenour (incumbent)	4,610	53.38%
Democratic	Maria Russo	4,027	46.62%
Total votes		8,637	100.0

== See also ==
- List of West Virginia state legislatures
