= 2024 West Virginia Republican presidential primary =

Presidential electoral process in West Virginia

- May 14, 2024

32 Republican National Convention delegates

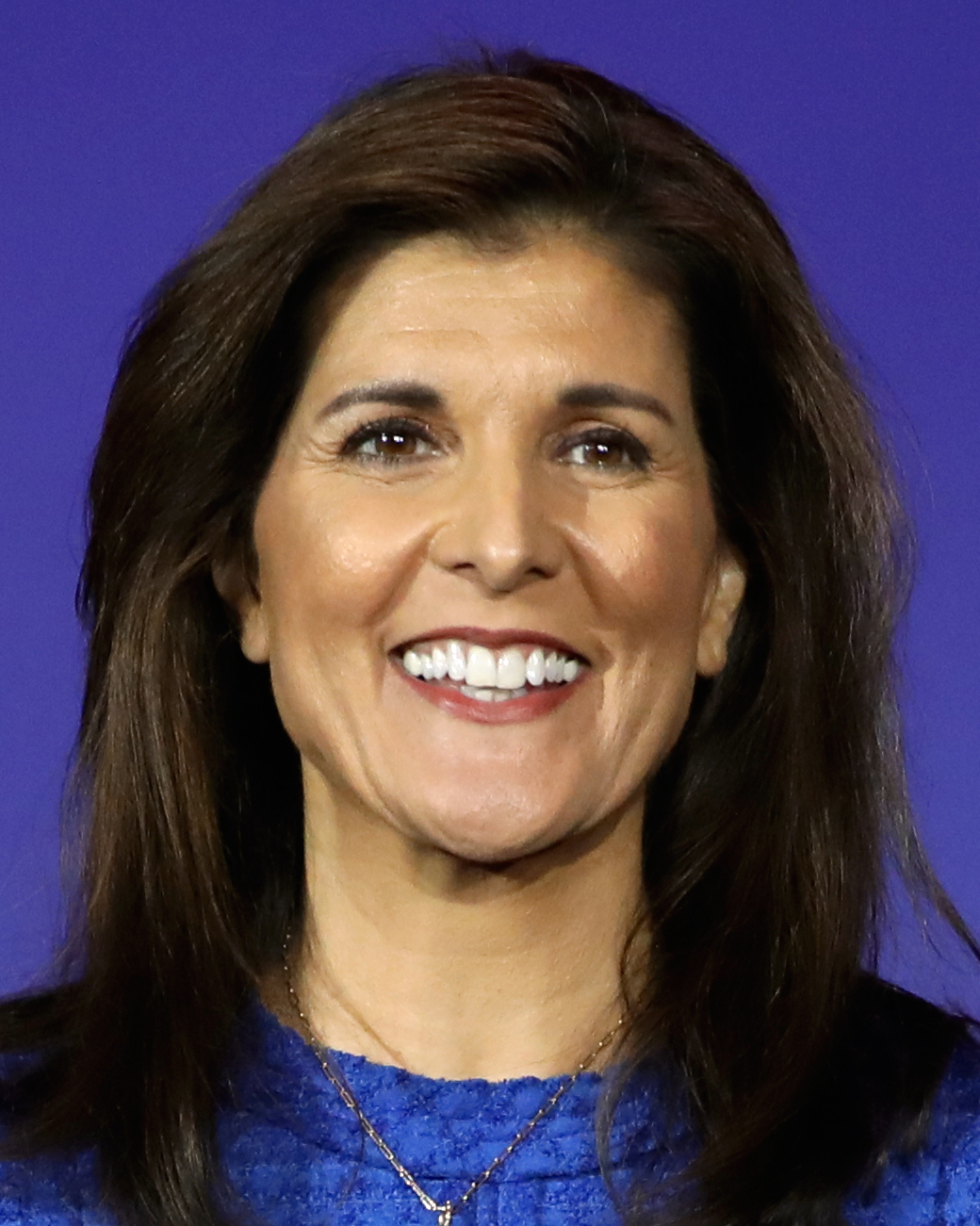
Candidate	Donald Trump	Nikki Haley (withdrawn)
Home state	Florida	South Carolina
Delegate count	32	0
Popular vote	199,497	21,231
Percentage	88.4%	9.4%
County results
Trump
70–80%
80–90%
>90%

The 2024 West Virginia Republican presidential primary was held on May 14, 2024, as part of the Republican Party primaries for the 2024 presidential election. 32 delegates to the 2024 Republican National Convention were allocated on a winner-take-all basis. The contest was held alongside the Maryland and Nebraska primaries.

== Endorsements ==
Asa Hutchinson (withdrawn)

Party officials

- Conrad Lucas, former Chair of the West Virginia Republican Party (2012–2018)
Donald Trump

U.S. Senator

- Shelley Moore Capito, (2015–present)

U.S. Representatives

- Carol Miller, WV-01 (2019–present) (Note: Numbered as the 3rd from 2019–2023)
- Alex Mooney, WV-02 (2015–present)

Governor

- Jim Justice (2017–present)

State executive officials

- Riley Moore, State Treasurer (2021–present)
- Patrick Morrisey, Attorney General (2013–present)

State senators

- Mike Azinger, District 3 (2017–present)
- Laura Wakim Chapman, District 1 (2022–present)
- Vince Deeds, District 10 (2022–present)
- Mark Hunt, District 8 (2022–present)
- Robert L. Karnes, District 14 (2020–present, 2015–2018)
- Rupie Phillips, District 7 (2020–present)
- Mike Stuart, District 7 (2022–present); U.S. Attorney for the Southern District of West Virginia (2018–2022)
- Eric Tarr, District 4 (2019–present)
- Jack Woodrum, District 10 (2020–present)

State delegates

- David Adkins, District 30 (2022–present)
- Trenton Barnhart, District 9 (2022–present) and the 7th district (2019–2022)
- Jordan Bridges, District 33 (2022–present) and District 24 (2020–2022)
- Eric Brooks, District 45 (2022–present)
- Jarred Cannon, District 21 (2022–present) and District 22 (2022)
- Moore Capito, 55th district (2022–present) and the 35th district (2016–2022)
- Geno Chiarelli, District 78 (2022–present)
- Wayne Clark, District 99 (2022–present)
- Roger Conley, District 10 (2020–2022)
- Elias Coop-Gonzalez, District 67 (2022–present)
- Mark Dean, District 34 (2022–present) and District 21 (2016–2022)
- Mike DeVault, District 74 (2022–present)
- Henry Dillon, District 29 (2022–present)
- Derrick Evans, District 19 (2020–2021) and participant in the 2021 United States Capitol attack
- Dave Foggin, District 14 (2022–present)
- Don Forsht, District 91 (2022–present)
- Geoff Foster, District 20 (2022–present) and District 15 (2014–2022)
- Marty Gearhart, District 37 (2022–present), District 27 (2020–2022, 2012–2018), and District 24 (2010–2012)
- Anita Hall, District 36 (2022–present)
- Josh Holstein, District 32 (2022–present) and District 23 (2020–2022)
- Michael Honaker, District 46 (2022–2023) and District 42 (2022)
- Michael Hornby, District 93 (2022–present)
- Eric Householder, District 96 (2022–present), District 64 (2012–2022), and District 56 (2010–2012); Majority Leader (2023–present)
- Gary Howell, District 87 (2022–present), District 58 (2012–2022), and District 49 (2010–2012); President pro tempore (2021–2023)
- D. Rolland Jennings, District 84 (2022–present) and District 53 (2016–2022)
- Riley Keaton, District 15 (2022–2023) and District 11 (2020–2022)
- David Kelly, District 8 (2022–present) and District 6 (2018–2022)
- Daniel Linville, District 22 (2022–present) and District 16 (2018–2022)
- Phil Mallow, District 75 (2022–present) and District 50 (2020–2022)
- Carl Martin, District 65 (2022–present) and District 45 (2018–2022)
- Margitta Mazzocchi, District 31 (2022–present) and the District 24 (2020–2022)
- Pat McGeehan, District 1 (2014–present, 2008–2010)
- George Miller, District 90 (2022–present) and District 58 (2020–2022)
- Ty Nestor, District 66 (2022–present) and District 43 (2020–2022)
- Chris Phillips, District 68 (2022–present) and District 47 (2018–2022)
- Chris Pritt, District 53 (2022–present) and District 36 (2020–2022)
- Charlie Reynolds, District 6 (2022–present) and District 4 (2020–2022)
- Doug Smith, District 39 (2022–present) and District 27 (2020–2022)
- Brandon Steele, District 42 (2022–present) and District 29 (2018–2022)
- Darren Thorne, District 89 (2022–present)
- Adam Vance, District 35 (2022–present)
- Bryan Ward, District 86 (2022–present) and District 55 (2020–2022)
- Jimmy Willis, District 3 (2022–present)

== Maps ==
Endorsements by incumbent Republicans in the West Virginia House of Delegates. Endorsed Donald Trump (39) No endorsement (50)

== Polling ==
Poll source	Date(s) administered	Sample size (Note: Key: A – all adults RV – registered voters LV – likely voters V – unclear)	Margin of error	Ron DeSantis	Nikki Haley	Asa Hutchinson	Mike Pence	Vivek Ramaswamy	Tim Scott	Donald Trump	Other	Undecided
ECU Center for Survey Research	May 22–23, 2023	957 (RV)	± 3.7%	9%	3%	2%	5%	2%	4%	54%	–	20%

== Results ==
West Virginia Republican primary, May 14, 2024
Candidate	Votes	Percentage	Actual delegate count		
Candidate	Votes	Percentage	Bound	Unbound	Total
Donald Trump	199,497	88.4%	32		32
Nikki Haley (withdrawn)	21,231	9.4%			
Rachel Swift	2,326	1.0%			
Ryan Binkley (withdrawn)	1,481	0.7%			
David Stuckenberg	1,168	0.5%			
Total:	225,703	100.0%	32		32

== See also ==
- 2024 West Virginia Democratic presidential primary
- 2024 Republican Party presidential primaries
- 2024 United States presidential election
- 2024 United States presidential election in West Virginia
- 2024 United States elections
