= Abortion in West Virginia =

Abortion in West Virginia is illegal except in cases of rape or incest (under 14 weeks), fatal fetal abnormalities, and when the mother’s life is at risk from a pregnancy.

The number of clinics in West Virginia has declined steeply from the original nineteen over the years, with ten in 1982, five in 1992, two in 2014, and one in 2017. There were 1,730 legal abortions in 2014, and 1,516 in 2015.

On September 13, 2022, West Virginia passed a near-total abortion ban in both houses of its legislature. Governor Jim Justice signed the bill into law on September 16, 2022. The Constitution of West Virginia was amended in 2018 to expressly ban abortion access.

The near-total ban on abortions is currently being challenged in court.

== Legislative and judicial history ==
West Virginia's primary abortion statute is a holdover from a Virginia law passed in 1848. The statute reads:

Any person who shall administer to, or cause to be taken by, a woman, any drug or other thing, or use any means, with intent to destroy her unborn child, or to produce abortion or miscarriage, and shall thereby destroy such child, or produce such abortion or miscarriage, shall be guilty of a felony, and, upon conviction, shall be confined in the penitentiary not less than three nor more than ten years; and if such woman die by reason of such abortion performed upon her, such person shall be guilty of murder. No person, by reason of any act mentioned in this section, shall be punishable where such act is done in good faith, with the intention of saving the life of such woman or child.

— West Virginia Code, § 61-2-8

In Roe v. Wade (1973), the Supreme Court of the United States ruled that states could no longer regulate abortion in the first trimester. (However, the Supreme Court overturned Roe v. Wade in Dobbs v. Jackson Women's Health Organization, No. 19-1392, 597 U.S. ___ (2022) later in 2022.) Following this, the above statute was declared unconstitutional by the Fourth Circuit Court of Appeals in Doe v. Charleston Area Medical Center (1975).

The West Virginia Legislature passed the Women's Right To Know Act in 2002, requiring abortion providers to read a counselling script to women seeking an abortion. These materials include details on fetal development by week and a list of "psychological risks" of the procedure, including guilt, depression, suicidal thoughts or acts, and "chronic relationship problems". Earlier editions of the script labelled the psychological risks as "post-traumatic stress disorder", in addition to containing scientifically unsupported warnings about a link between abortion and breast cancer.

In March 2015, the West Virginia legislature overrode a veto from governor Earl Ray Tomblin to pass "The Pain-Capable Unborn Child Protection Act", outlawing abortions more than 20 weeks into a pregnancy.

West Virginia requires parental consent for a minor to receive an abortion. Historically, this could be avoided by a waiver from a physician; in 2017, HB2002 was enacted, requiring the physician's waiver to also be approved by a judge.

In July 2022, Dean Jeffries (politician), Rolland Jennings, Mark Dean (politician), Michael Honaker, Guy Ward, Ruth Rowan Phil Mallow, Evan Worrell, Don Forsht, and George Miller authored House Bill 302, a total abortion ban with exceptions for medical emergency, and rape or incest when under 14 weeks. Governor Jim Justice signed the bill into law on September 16, 2022.

=== Clinic history ===
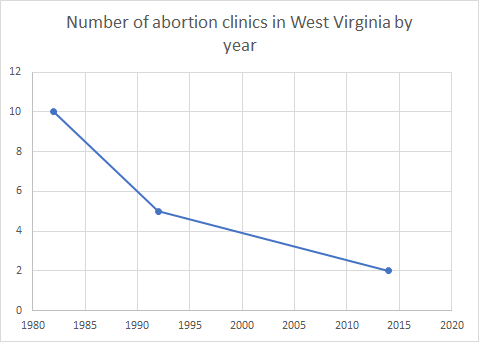
Number of abortion clinics in West Virginia by year

The Women's Health Center of West Virginia opened in 1976. Between 1982 and 1992, the number of abortion clinics in the state declined by five, going from ten in 1982 to five in 1992. In 1998, 96% of the counties in the state lacked an abortion clinic.

In 2014, there were two abortion clinics in the state. In 2014, 98% of the counties in the state did not have an abortion clinic. That year, 90% of women in the state aged 15–44 lived in a county without an abortion clinic. In 2017, only about 20% of all patients at the Women's Health Center of West Virginia went seeking abortion services. Women came from Ohio and Kentucky to utilize their services. Few came from Virginia, which had more clinics providing abortion services. In 2017, there was only one Planned Parenthood clinic, which did not offer abortion services, in a state with a population of 392,351 women aged 15–49. As of July 21, 2017, Kentucky, Louisiana, Mississippi, North Dakota, West Virginia, and Wyoming were the only six states that did not have a Planned Parenthood clinic offering abortion services. In January 2017, Kanawha Surgicenter closed after the doctor running the clinic moved to California, leaving the Women's Health Center of West Virginia as the only abortion clinic in the state. In May 2019, the state was officially one of six in the nation with only one abortion clinic.

After the decision in Dobbs v. Jackson Women's Health Organization, the Women's Health Center of West Virginia stopped offering abortion services in the state.

== Statistics ==
In the period between 1972 and 1974, there were zero recorded illegal abortion deaths in the state. In 1990, 179,000 women in the state faced the risk of an unintended pregnancy. In 2013, among white women aged 15–19, there were 230 abortions, 40 abortions for black women aged 15–19, 0 abortions for Hispanic women aged 15–19, and 0 abortions for women of all other races. In 2014, only 35% of West Virginians in a poll approved of legalized abortion in most or all situations. But the 2023 American Values Atlas reported that, in their most recent survey, 57% of West Virginians said that abortion should be legal in all or most cases. In 2016, only four minors had abortions that bypassed parental consent by getting a waiver. In 2017, the state had an infant mortality rate of 7.0 deaths per 1,000 live births.

Number of reported abortions, abortion rate and percentage change in rate by geographic region and state in 1992, 1995 and 1996
Census division and state	Number			Rate			% change 1992–1996
Census division and state	1992	1995	1996	1992	1995	1996	% change 1992–1996
South Atlantic	269,200	261,990	263,600	25.9	24.6	24.7	–5
Delaware	5,730	5,790	4,090	35.2	34.4	24.1	–32
District of Columbia	21,320	21,090	20,790	138.4	151.7	154.5	12
Florida	84,680	87,500	94,050	30	30	32	7
Georgia	39,680	36,940	37,320	24	21.2	21.1	–12
Maryland	31,260	30,520	31,310	26.4	25.6	26.3	0
North Carolina	36,180	34,600	33,550	22.4	21	20.2	–10
South Carolina	12,190	11,020	9,940	14.2	12.9	11.6	–19
Virginia	35,020	31,480	29,940	22.7	20	18.9	–16
West Virginia	3,140	3,050	2,610	7.7	7.6	6.6	–14

Number, rate, and ratio of reported abortions, by reporting area of residence and occurrence and by percentage of abortions obtained by out-of-state residents, US CDC estimates
Location	Residence			Occurrence			% obtained by out-of-state residents	Year	Ref
Location	No.	Rate^	Ratio^^	No.	Rate^	Ratio^^	% obtained by out-of-state residents	Year	Ref
West Virginia	1,884	5.6	93	1,730	5.1	85	13.2	2014	
West Virginia	1,736	5.2	88	1,516	4.5	77	12.7	2015	
West Virginia	1,637	5.0	86	1,428	4.4	75	12.0	2016	
^number of abortions per 1,000 women aged 15–44; ^^number of abortions per 1,000 live births

== Public opinion ==
In 2014, polling by Pew Research indicated that 35% of citizens in West Virginia thought abortion should be legal in most or all cases, while 58% said it should be illegal in most or all cases.

In 2022, a poll indicated that 40% of citizens in West Virginia state thought abortion should be legal in most or all cases, while 55% thought it should be illegal in most or all cases.

Polling by Pew Research from July 2023 to March 2024, indicated that 54% of adults in West Virginia thought abortion should be legal "in all/most cases", while 46% of adults in West Virginia thought abortion should be illegal "in all/most cases".

== Abortion financing ==
Since 2018 West Virginia covers abortion only in case of rape, incest, or life endangerment. Before 2018 West Virginia used their own funds to cover all or most "medically necessary" abortions sought by low-income women under Medicaid. In 2010, the state had 1,111 publicly funded abortions, of which all were state funded and none were federally funded.

== Abortion rights views and activities ==
=== Protests ===
Women from the state participated in marches supporting abortion rights as part of a #StoptheBans movement in May 2019.

Following the overturn of Roe v. Wade on June 24, 2022, hundreds of abortion rights protesters gathered in Charleston, Huntington, Fairmont, and Shepherdstown. Abortion rights protesters gathered and rallied at the West Virginia State Capitol for several days in July and August. On September 13, more than a dozen abortion rights protesters were forcibly removed from the West Virginia statehouse after lawmakers passed a near-total ban on abortion.
