= Scott Cadle =

American politician

Member of the West Virginia House of Delegates from the 13th district
- In office December 1, 2012 – December 1, 2016
- Preceded by: Helen Martin
- In office December 1, 2018 – December 1, 2020
- Succeeded by: Jonathan Pinson, Joshua Higginbotham

Personal details
- Party: Republican
- Education: Glenville State College

Scott Nelson Cadle is an American politician and a former Republican member of the West Virginia House of Delegates representing the 13th District from 2012 to 2016 and again from 2018 until 2020.

== Politics ==
Cadle made national news in 2016 for sharing and drinking unpasteurized milk, after voting for a law that legalized it in West Virginia. Cadle claimed that any illness from consuming the milk was a coincidence. He was later reprimanded by the West Virginia Department of Health and Human Resources in connection with the incident.

In 2018, Cadle was named as an assistant majority whip by Speaker Roger Hanshaw.

In 2020, Cadle voted against the creation of an intermediate court of appeals. Later that year, Cadle joined six fellow Delegates in a letter to Governor Jim Justice, expressing concern over the use of emergency gubernatorial powers during the coronavirus pandemic.

== Personal ==
Cadle has worked as a truck driver for over 45 years. Cadle attended Glenville State College.

== Elections ==
- 2020: Cadle was one of ten incumbent Republican lawmakers—including seven in the House of Delegates, who lost to fellow Republicans in the June primary election. Cadle came in third place (out of five contenders) in the 13th District's top-two primary, behind future Delegate Jonathan Pinson and then-Delegate Joshua Higginbotham.
- 2012: To challenge incumbent District 13 Democratic Representatives Brady Paxton and appointed Representative Helen Martin, Cadle ran in the four-way May 8, 2012 Republican Primary and placed first with 1,526 votes (32.3%), and placed second in the four-way two-position November 6, 2012 General election with 6,149 votes (25.7%) behind Representative Paxton and ahead of fellow Republican nominee Brian Scott and Democratic Representative Martin.
