= Jonathan Pinson =

American politician

Member of the West Virginia House of Delegates from the 13th district
- Incumbent
- Assumed office December 1, 2020 Serving with Kathie Hess Crouse
- Preceded by: Scott Cadle

Personal details
- Born: Jonathan Adam Pinson
- Party: Republican
- Spouse: Amy Pinson
- Education: West Virginia University at Parkersburg
- Occupation: Police officer, pastor

Jonathan Adam Pinson is an American politician who has served as a Delegate from the 13th district to the West Virginia House of Delegates since 2020. Pinson is a Republican.

== Early life, education, and career ==
Pinson was educated at West Virginia University at Parkersburg, a community college. He also graduated from the West Virginia police academy. Before running for office, Pinson served as a police officer with Jackson County, West Virginia and as a pastor.

== Elections ==
=== 2020 ===
In his first primary, Pinson received 33.03% of the vote to be sent to the nomination alongside fellow Republican Joshua Higginbotham.

In the general, Pinson received 36.04%, the highest percentage in the select-two election to be sent to the House of Delegates.

=== 2022 ===
After redistricting, Pinson ran in the redrawn 17th House of Delegates District. He defeated Republican challengers Morgan Hurlow and Robert Marchal, receiving 79.8% of the vote to be nominated.

== Tenure ==
=== Committee assignments ===
- Agriculture and Natural Resources
- Judiciary
- Senior, Children, and Family Issues

=== Transgender rights ===
Pinson voted for a bill that would prohibit transgender athletes from competing on the team that aligns with their gender identity.

=== Worker's rights ===
Woodrum voted for SB 11, a bill that would make it more difficult for employees to strike.

=== DC statehood ===
With many of his fellow Delegates, Pinson signed onto a resolution requesting West Virginia Senators and Congresspeople to oppose bills that would allow statehood for the District of Columbia.

== Personal life ==
Pinson is married to Amy Pinson and has three children. He is a Baptist and serves as a Baptist pastor.
