= Winzenreid =

Winzenreid, Winzenried or Wanzenried is a surname of European origin.

== People with the name ==
- David Wanzenried, Montana politician
- Diana Winzenreid, West Virginia politician
- Gottlieb Wanzenried (1906–1993), Swiss cyclist
- Mark Winzenried (born 1949), American former middle-distance runner

== See also ==
- Reid
- Wangenried
