= Elliott Pritt =

American politician and child sex offender (born 1990)

Member of the West Virginia House of Delegates from the 50th district
- In office December 1, 2022 – July 27, 2026
- Preceded by: New boundaries
- Succeeded by: William Vest

Personal details
- Born: David Elliott Pritt; March 23, 1990 (age 36) Beckley, West Virginia, U.S.
- Party: Republican (from 2023)
- Other political affiliations: Democratic (2022–2023); Mountain (2018–2022); Socialist (before 2018)
- Spouse: Ashton
- Children: 4
- Education: Concord University (BA, MA)

Military service
- Branch/service: United States Air Force
- Years of service: 2008–2014
- Rank: Staff Sergeant
- Unit: 353rd SOMXS, Kadena ABS, Japan, 58th AMXS, Albuquerque, New Mexico
- Commands: AFSOC
- Criminal information
- Conviction: One count of attempted production of child pornography

Details
- Victims: 1
- Date apprehended: July 22, 2026

David Elliott Pritt (born March 23, 1990) is an American politician who served in the West Virginia House of Delegates from 2022 to 2026. He represented the 50th district in Fayette County.

Following allegations of raping a 15 year old girl and former student, he was subsequently arrested on charges of enticement of a minor. Pritt officially resigned from the West Virginia House of Delegates in a letter to House Speaker Roger Hanshaw on July 27, 2026.

== Personal life ==
Pritt was born in Beckley, West Virginia. He has a Bachelor of Arts degree in history, and a Master of Arts degree in teaching, both from Concord University. He is a Roman Catholic. He has served in the United States Air Force, and teaches history at Fayetteville Middle School.

=== Sexual abuse allegations ===
Pritt was arrested on July 22, 2026 and charged with enticing a minor after an investigation found that he communicated with a girl through Roblox and Snapchat. The complaint said that Pritt later initiated a physical relationship with the minor and requested that she meet him in his classroom at Oak Hill High School to engage in sexual activity at least five to ten times.

Following his arrest, Pritt's teaching license was suspended and the West Virginia Republican Party unanimously voted to disavow Pritt.

On November 10, 2026, Pritt entered into a guilty plea with prosecutors, pleading guilty to one count of attempted production of child pornography in exchange for two other counts in his indictment being dropped.

== Political career ==
Originally a member member of the Socialist Party, Pritt joined the Mountain Party to run for the 32nd district of the West Virginia House of Delegates in 2018, with a cross-nomination from the Socialist Party. He came in seventh place out of seven candidates.

He would win election to the House of Delegates in 2022 as a Democrat. He changed his party affiliation to Republican in 2023. Since becoming a member of the House Republican Caucus in 2023, Pritt was named Assistant Majority Leader of the House Republican Caucus by Speaker Roger Hanshaw for the 87th West Virginia Legislature in 2025. He served under Majority Leader Pat McGeehan.

Pritt was re-elected to the West Virginia House of Delegates on November 5, 2024 with nearly 70% of the total vote in a three-way race. Pritt represented one-third of Fayette County, West Virginia in the West Virginia House of Delegates.

=== Electoral history ===
West Virginia's 50th House of Delegates district, 2022
Party	Candidate	Votes	%
Democratic	Elliott Pritt	1,892	51.8
Republican	Austin Haynes (incumbent)	1,759	48.2
Total votes		3,651	100.0
Democratic win (new boundaries)			

West Virginia's 50th House of Delegates district, 2024
Party	Candidate	Votes	%
Republican	Elliott Pritt (incumbent)	3,928	66.42
Democratic	Jerry L. Allen	1,587	26.83
	Scotty Bowman	399	6.75
Total votes		5,914	100.0
Republican hold			
