= Chris Toney =

American politician

Member of the West Virginia House of Delegates from the 31st district
- Incumbent
- Assumed office 2018
- Preceded by: Chanda Adkins

Personal details
- Born: Christopher Wayne Toney; February 13, 1988 (age 38)
- Party: Republican
- Education: B.A., Concord University

Christopher Wayne Toney (born February 13, 1988) is an American politician who has served as a Delegate from the 31st District to the West Virginia House of Delegates since 2018. He is a Republican.

== Early life, education, and career ==
Toney was born to Gregory Toney and Emma Shrewsbury. He received a B.A. in History and Special Education from Concord University. He operated a school bus before assuming office.

== Elections ==
=== 2018 ===
In his first primary, Toney defeated incumbent Chanda Adkins with 51.16% of the vote.

In the general election, Toney defeated Democrat Richard Snuffer with 55.76% of the vote to win his seat in the House of Delegates.

=== 2020 ===
In Toney's second primary election, he defeated fellow Republican Kase Poling with 56.60% of the vote.

In the general, Toney ran and won unopposed.

== Tenure ==
=== Committee assignments ===
- Veterans Affairs (Vice Chair)
- Education
- Finance
- Senior, Children, and Family Issues
- Small Business and Economic Development

=== Coal ===
Toney voted for $12 million worth of tax cuts and exemptions in order to bail out a failing coal plant.

=== Education ===
Toney was one of a few Republicans to oppose an omnibus education bill that would allow charter schools in West Virginia and increase school funding, among other things.

Additionally, Toney supported a bill to allow students in home-school to participate in public school sports, on the condition that they take certain virtual classes.

=== Federal term limits ===
Toney sponsored a resolution supporting a Constitutional convention to consider term limits for members of Congress. A similar resolution was adopted by both houses of the legislature in 2021. Many more states would have to ratify similar resolutions for a convention to be held.

=== Gun control ===
As of 2020, Toney had an "A" rating from the NRA Political Victory Fund and a 64% rating from the West Virginia Citizen's Defense League, a local gun rights organization.

Toney supported a bill to allow concealed carry on college campuses. The bill was ultimately stalled in the State Senate by protest and debate.

=== Labor ===
Toney has a 44% rating from the AFL–CIO as of 2020. He voted against a bill that would make it more difficult for employees to strike.

=== Marijuana ===
Toney opposed efforts to legalize marijuana in West Virginia and efforts to expand access to medical marijuana.

=== West Virginia Impact Fund ===
Toney sponsored a bipartisan bill to create a fund to invest in and attract businesses to West Virginia in order to create jobs. Additionally, Toney wrote an op-ed praising the legislation. The bill was signed by West Virginia Governor Jim Justice in March 2020.

== Personal life ==
Toney is a Christian.
