= John Paul Hott =

American politician

Member of the West Virginia House of Delegates from the 54th district
- Incumbent
- Assumed office December 1, 2018

Personal details
- Born: September 23, 1969 (age 56) Petersburg, West Virginia, U.S.
- Party: Republican
- Spouse: Karen Hott
- Children: 4
- Education: Frostburg State University (BA, MEd)

John Paul Hott II (born September 23, 1969) is an American politician serving as a member of the West Virginia House of Delegates from the 54th district. Elected in November 2018, he assumed office on December 1, 2018.

== Early life and education ==
Hott was born in Petersburg, West Virginia in 1969. He earned a Bachelor of Arts degree in education and Master of Education from Frostburg State University.

== Career ==
Outside of politics, Hott has worked as an insurance agent. He also served as a member of the Petersburg City Council from 2009 to 2014. Hott was elected to the West Virginia House of Delegates in November 2018 and assumed office on December 1, 2018. In the 2021–2022 legislative session, Hott is vice chair of the House Banking and Insurance Committee. He is also chair of the House Forest Management Review Commission.
