= Don Forsht =

American politician

Member of the West Virginia House of Representatives from the 91st district
- In office December 1, 2022 – December 1, 2024
- Succeeded by: Ian Masters

Member of the West Virginia House of Representatives from the 60th district
- In office December 1, 2020 – December 1, 2022
- Preceded by: S. Marshall Wilson
- Succeeded by: Dana Ferrell

Personal details
- Born: Washington, D.C.
- Party: Republican
- Spouse: Mary Carson
- Children: 5
- Education: University of Maryland
- Occupation: Business owner

Don Forsht is an American politician who served in the West Virginia House of Delegates from 2020 to 2024.

== Biography ==
Forsht earned a bachelor's degree in business and information technology from the University of Maryland. He served in the United States Air Force in the Vietnam War. He is a Christian. He is a member and former president of Blue Ridge Patriots, a Tea Party Political action committee.

== Electoral history ==
Forsht was elected to the 60th district in the 2020 West Virginia House of Delegates election, and was redistricted to the 91st district in the 2022 West Virginia House of Delegates election. He lost the Republican primary to Joseph de Soto in the 2024 West Virginia House of Delegates election.
