= D. Rolland Jennings =

American politician

Member of the West Virginia House of Representatives from the 84th district
- Incumbent
- Assumed office December 1, 2022

Member of the West Virginia House of Representatives from the 53rd district
- In office 2018 – December 1, 2022
- Preceded by: Tony Lewis
- Succeeded by: Chris Pritt

Personal details
- Born: September 3, 1951 (age 74)
- Party: Republican
- Spouse: Evelyn J. Jennings
- Children: 3

D. Rolland "Buck" Jennings (born September 3, 1951) is an American politician serving as a member of the West Virginia House of Delegates.

== Electoral history ==
Jennings lost in the Republican primary in the 2016 West Virginia House of Delegates election. He was first elected to the 53rd district in the 2018 West Virginia House of Delegates election. He was reelected in the 2020 West Virginia House of Delegates election. He was redistricted to the 84th district in the 2022 West Virginia House of Delegates election. He ran unopposed in the 2024 West Virginia House of Delegates election after winning the primary.

== Personal life ==
Jennings is a United Methodist.
