= Bill Anderson (West Virginia politician) =

American politician (born 1948)

Member of the West Virginia House of Delegates from the 10th district
- Incumbent
- Assumed office December 1, 2022
- Preceded by: Multiple incumbents

Member of the West Virginia House of Delegates from the 8th district
- In office December 1, 1992 – December 1, 2022
- Preceded by: Constituency established
- Succeeded by: David Kelly

Personal details
- Born: Everette William Anderson; August 9, 1948 (age 78) Parkersburg, West Virginia, U.S.
- Party: Republican
- Education: Marshall University; West Virginia University

Everette William Anderson (born August 9, 1948) is an American politician who is a Republican member of the West Virginia House of Delegates representing District 10 since 2022 and District 8 from 1992 to 2022.

== Education ==
Anderson earned his BA from Marshall University and his MA from West Virginia University.

== Elections ==
- 2012 Anderson was unopposed for the May 8, 2012 Republican Primary, winning with 1,531 votes, and won the three-way November 6, 2012 General election with 4,842 votes (66.8%) against Democratic nominee Denzil Malone and Independent candidate Bob Buchanan.
- 1990s Anderson was initially elected in the 1992 Republican Primary and the November 3, 1992 General election and re-elected in the general elections of November 8, 1994 and November 5, 1996.
- 1998 Anderson was unopposed for both the 1998 Republican Primary and the November 3, 1998 General election.
- 2000 Anderson was unopposed for the 2000 Republican Primary and won the November 7, 2000 General election against Democratic nominee Pat Criss.
- 2002 Anderson was unopposed for the 2002 Republican Primary and won the November 5, 2002 General election against Democratic nominee Becky Sutphin.
- 2004 Anderson was challenged in the 2004 Republican Primary but won, and was unopposed for the November 2, 2004 General election.
- 2006 Anderson was unopposed for both the 2006 Republican Primary and the November 7, 2006 General election.
- 2008 Anderson was unopposed for the May 13, 2008 Republican Primary, winning with 1,541 votes, and won the November 4, 2008 General election with 5,023 votes (67.3%) against Democratic nominee Charles Webb.
- 2010 Anderson was unopposed for both the May 11, 2010 Republican Primary, winning with 1,343 votes, and the November 2, 2010 General election, winning with 4,530 votes.
