= Jeffrey Stephens =

American politician

Jeffrey Stephens is an American politician from West Virginia. He is a Republican and represents District 6 in the West Virginia House of Delegates since 2024.

Stephens is a graduate of West Liberty University. Jeffrey Stephens is a public schoolteacher by profession. In 2023, Governor Jim Justice appointed Stephens to fill the vacancy created by Charlie Reynolds.
