= Erica Moore (politician) =

American politician

Erica J. Moore is an American politician from West Virginia. She is a Republican and represents District 15 in the West Virginia House of Delegates since 2023.

Moore was born in Parkersburg, West Virginia and graduated with a degree in computer science from West Virginia University. Moore is the former clerk for the Water and Sewer Department of the City of Spencer.

Moore has lived in Roane County with her husband for 34 years and previously worked managing a family oil and gas business. In 2023, Governor Jim Justice appointed Moore to fill the vacancy created by Riley Keaton.
