= JB Akers =

American politician

Member of the West Virginia House of Delegates from the 55th district
- Incumbent
- Assumed office January 9, 2024
- Appointed by: Jim Justice
- Preceded by: Moore Capito

Personal details
- Born: James Robert Akers II West Virginia, U.S.
- Party: Republican
- Spouse: Maryclaire Atkins
- Education: Wake Forest University (BA); West Virginia University (JD)
- Website: www.jbakers.com

James Robert "JB" Akers II is an American politician from West Virginia. He is a Republican and represents District 55 in the West Virginia House of Delegates since 2023.

Akers is a graduate of Wake Forest University and West Virginia University. In 2024, Governor Jim Justice appointed Akers to fill the vacancy created by Moore Capito.
