= Scot Heckert =

American politician

Member of the West Virginia House of Representatives from the 13th district
- Incumbent
- Assumed office December 1, 2022
- Preceded by: redistricting

Personal details
- Party: Republican
- Occupation: Business owner

Scot Heckert is an American politician serving as a member of the West Virginia House of Delegates from the 13th district. Elected on November 8, 2022, he assumed office on December 1, 2022.

== Biography ==
His father, R.C. “Heck” Heckert died in August 2022.

== Political Positions ==
Heckert is anti-abortion.
