= Walter Hall (American politician) =

American politician

Member of the West Virginia House of Delegates from the 58th district
- Incumbent
- Assumed office December 1, 2022
- Preceded by: George Miller

Personal details
- Born: April 10, 1963 (age 63) South Charleston, West Virginia, U.S.
- Party: Republican
- Spouse: Sue
- Education: B.B.A in marketing
- Alma mater: Marshall University
- Occupation: Insurance agent

Walter Hall (born April 10, 1963) is an American Insurance agent and politician serving as a member of the West Virginia House of Delegates from the 58th district. Elected on November 8, 2022, he assumed office on December 1, 2022.

== Biography ==
Hall was born in South Charleston, West Virginia to parents Kyle L. Hall and Barbara A. Hall. He is a Baptist and attends Grace Baptist Temple in St. Albans, West Virginia. He went to high school at Saint Albans High School and graduated from Marshall University with a B.B.A in marketing.
