= Jordan Bridges (politician) =

American politician (born 1988)

Member of the West Virginia House of Delegates from the 24th district
- Incumbent
- Assumed office 2020 Serving with Margitta Mazzocchi
- Preceded by: Tim Tomblin

Personal details
- Born: Jordan Ray Bridges; March 28, 1988 (age 38) Logan, West Virginia, U.S.
- Party: Republican
- Education: Southern West Virginia Community and Technical College

Jordan Ray Bridges (born March 28, 1988) is an American politician who has served as a Delegate from the 24th District to the West Virginia House of Delegates since 2020. He is a Republican.

== Early life, education, and career ==
Bridges was born in Logan, West Virginia, to Bobby and Jackie Bridges. He attended the Southern West Virginia Community and Technical College. He was employed in the coal industry before assuming office.

== Elections ==
=== 2018 ===
Bridges first ran for office in 2018 but was ultimately unsuccessful. Bridges was one of two Republicans to receive his party's nomination in the primary, receiving 44.27% of the vote. In the four-way, elect-two general election, Bridges, as well as his fellow Republican, was defeated by Democrats Tim Tomblin and Ralph Rodighiero. Bridges received 22.82% of the vote.

=== 2020 ===
Bridges ran again in 2020. During his campaign, Bridges supported investment in infrastructure, limited regulations on business, and less taxation.

In his primary, Bridges was nominated alongside Margitta Mazzocchi with 60.37% of the vote.

In the general, Bridges defeated Tomblin and another Democrat with 29.24% of the vote.

== Tenure ==
=== Committee assignments ===
- Agriculture and Natural Resources
- Education
- Energy and Manufacturing
- Workforce Development

=== Coal ===
As a former coal miner, Bridges joined an unofficial bipartisan workgroup designed to aid the recovery of communities reliant on the failing coal industry.

=== Transgender rights ===
Bridges was a cosponsor of House Bill 3293, a bill that would prohibit transgender athletes from competing on sports teams that align with their gender identity. After announcing that he would cosponsor the bill on his Facebook page, Bridges liked a number of posts that encouraged violence against the transgender community, compared transgender people to pigs, and used the derogatory term, "tranny." The bill was cited in a June 2020 statement by the Department of Justice, which argued that the bill violated federal law, the Fourteenth Amendment, and Title IX.

=== Worker's rights ===
Bridges voted against SB 11, a bill that would make it more difficult for employees to strike.

== Personal life ==
Bridges has two children. He is of the Christian faith.
