= Vernon Criss =

American politician

Member of the West Virginia House of Delegates
- Incumbent
- Assumed office December 1, 2016
- Preceded by: Mike Azinger
- Constituency: 12th district (2022–present); 10th district (2016–2022)
- In office December 8, 1987 – December 1, 1990
- Preceded by: Sandy Rogers
- Succeeded by: J.D. Beane; Larry Border; Brenda Brum; Barbara W. Sims
- Constituency: 8th district

Personal details
- Born: September 25, 1954 (age 71)
- Party: Republican

Vernon Criss (born September 25, 1954) is an American politician who has served in the West Virginia House of Delegates from the 12th district since 2016. He previously served in the West Virginia House of Delegates from the 8th district from 1987 to 1990.
