= Matthew Rohrbach =

American politician

Matt Rohrbach

Speaker pro tempore of the West Virginia House of Delegates
- Incumbent
- Assumed office January 8, 2025
- Preceded by: Paul Espinosa

Member of the West Virginia House of Delegates from the 17th district
- Incumbent
- Assumed office December 1, 2014
- Preceded by: Dale Stephens

Personal details
- Born: Matthew Alan Rohrbach; May 12, 1959 (age 67) Huntington, West Virginia, U.S.
- Party: Republican
- Education: Marshall University (BS, MD)

Matthew Alan "Matt" Rohrbach (born May 12, 1959) is an American politician who has served in the West Virginia House of Delegates from the 17th district since 2014.

West Virginia House of Delegates
Preceded by Paul Espinosa	Speaker pro tempore of the West Virginia House of Delegates; 2025–present	Incumbent
