= Joe Funkhouser =

American politician

Member of the West Virginia House of Delegates from the 98th district
- Incumbent
- Assumed office October 24, 2024
- Preceded by: Paul Espinosa

Personal details
- Party: Republican

Joe Funkhouser is an American politician who serves as a Republican member for the 98th district of the West Virginia House of Delegates.

== Legislation ==
During his first term as delegate, Funkhouser put forth two bills regarding the regulation of groundwater. Faced with opposition lobbying from a California firm, these bills did not make it to a vote. Funkhouser indicated that his efforts to address groundwater would continue.
