= Joshua Higginbotham =

American politician (born 1996)

Member of the West Virginia House of Delegates from the 13th district
- In office December 1, 2016 – November 5, 2021
- Preceded by: Michael Ihle
- Succeeded by: Kathie Hess Crouse

Personal details
- Born: Joshua Kurt Higginbotham; July 23, 1996 (age 30)
- Party: Republican
- Education: University of Charleston (BA)

Joshua Kurt Higginbotham (born July 23, 1996) is an American politician and author. He served in the West Virginia House of Delegates as a Republican, representing the 13th district, from 2016 until November 2021.

== Early life and education ==
Higginbotham is the son of Kurt and Trina Higginbotham. He graduated from Poca High School in 2014 and earned a Bachelor of Arts degree in history from the University of Charleston in 2017.

== Career ==
Higginbotham was elected to the House of Delegates for the 13th district in 2016. At the time of his taking office, he was 20 years old, the youngest member of the House.

In 2018, Higginbotham was among delegates that visited Taiwan to promote investment in West Virginia. In December 2018, he was named an assistant majority whip by House Speaker Roger Hanshaw.

In 2021, Higginbotham was the lead Republican sponsor of the Fairness Act, which would add sexual orientation and gender identity as protected classes in West Virginia's Human Rights Act and the Fair Housing Act. Higginbotham was also the only Republican in the House to vote against a bill that forces transgender students to play on sports teams according to the sex they are assigned at birth, as opposed to their gender identity. Later that year, Higginbotham attended the Spirit of Lincoln Gala honoring former First Lady Melania Trump, hosted by the Log Cabin Republicans. He also visited the America First Policy Institute, led by former Trump administration officials. As of September 2021, Higginbotham has been the lead sponsor of 49 different bills in the Legislature.

In September 2021, Higginbotham announced he will run for the West Virginia Senate in the 2022 elections for a seat in the Kanawha Valley. In December 2021, Higginbotham was endorsed by former EPA administrator and Trump cabinet member Andrew Wheeler.

He is also a member of the American Legislative Exchange Council, a conservative lobbying group.

== Personal life ==
Higginbotham is a Presbyterian. In 2014, at the age of 18, Higginbotham released Ecclesiastes, a fictionalized version of the Bible book of the same name, on eLectio Publishing.

In June 2021, Higginbotham made statewide and national news when he publicly came out as gay, becoming the first openly gay Republican lawmaker in West Virginia.
