= Laura Kimble =

American politician

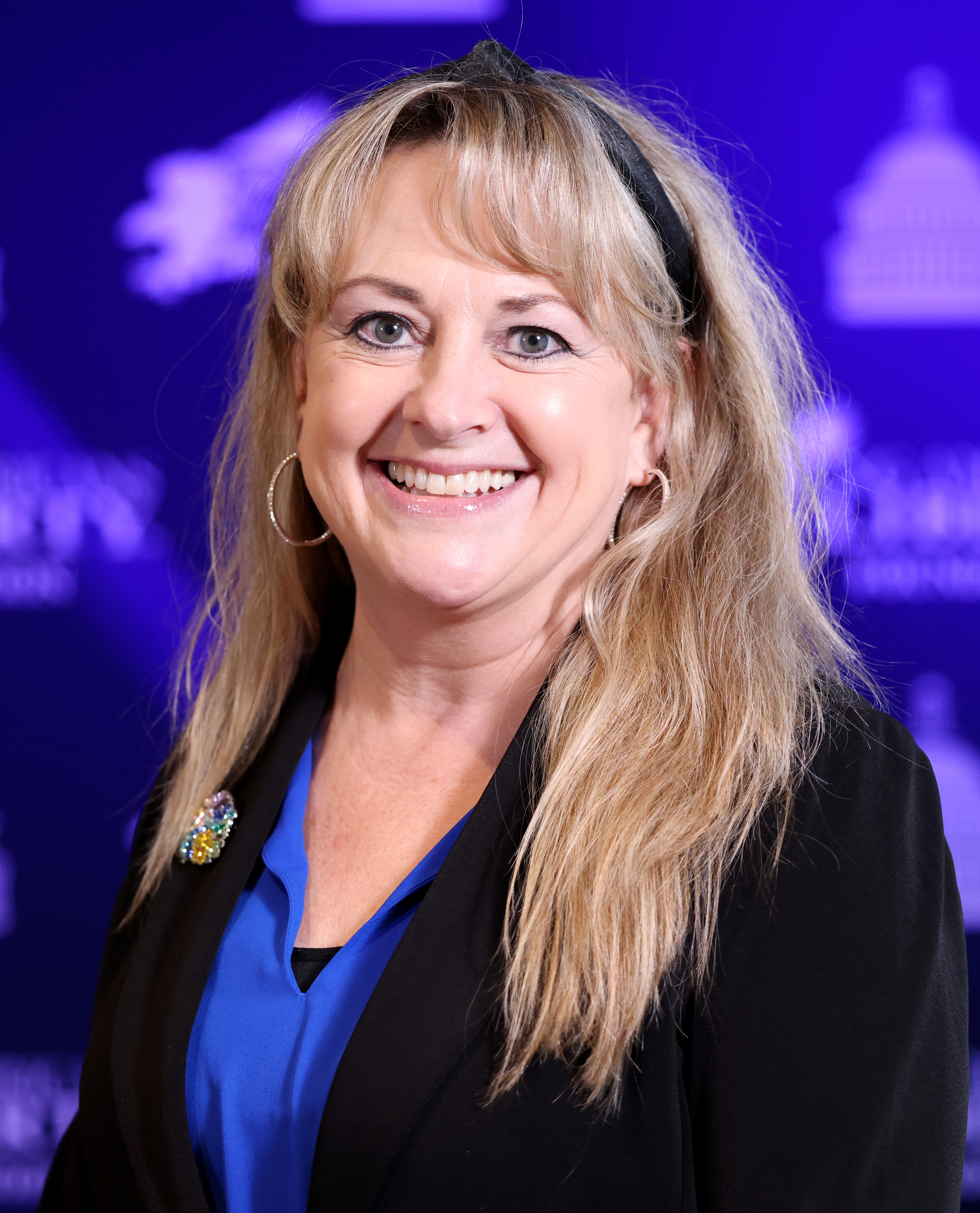
- Kimble at the 2024 Hazlitt Summit hosted by Young Americans for Liberty Foundation

Member of the West Virginia House of Delegates from the 48th district
- Incumbent
- Assumed office 2020
- Preceded by: Tim Miley

Personal details
- Born: June 11, 1967 (age 59) Loveland, Colorado, U.S.
- Party: Republican
- Spouse: Jeffrey Kimble
- Education: BA, West Virginia University

Laura Kimble (nee Critchfield; born July 11, 1967) is an American politician who has served as a Delegate from the 48th district to the West Virginia House of Delegates since 2020. Kimble is a member of the Republican Party.

== Early life and education ==
Kimble was born on July 11, 1967, in Loveland, Colorado to parents Clark and Diana Critchfield. Her family moved to Clarksburg, West Virginia when she was nine years old and she graduated from Washington Irving High School. Upon completing her Bachelor of Arts degree in International Studies from West Virginia University, she married Jeffrey Kimble. They have three children.

== Career ==
After spending three years on the Harrison County Republican Executive Committee, Kimble was elected to serve as a Delegate from the 48th district to the West Virginia House of Delegates in 2020.
