= Ty Nestor =

American attorney and politician

Member of the West Virginia House of Delegates from the 66th district
- In office December 1, 2022 – December 1, 2024
- Preceded by: Paul Espinosa
- Succeeded by: Jonathan Kyle

Member of the West Virginia House of Delegates from the 43rd district
- In office December 1, 2020 – December 1, 2022
- Preceded by: William Hartman

Personal details
- Born: William Nestor
- Party: Republican
- Education: West Virginia University (BA, JD)

William "Ty" Nestor is an American attorney and politician who was a member of the West Virginia House of Delegates. Elected in November 2020, he assumed office on December 1, 2020.

== Background ==
Nestor earned a Bachelor of Arts degree in political science and Juris Doctor from West Virginia University. Nestor is the founder of the Nestor Law Office and Tygart Valley Distributor, Inc. He was elected to the West Virginia House of Delegates in November 2020 and assumed office on December 1, 2020.
