= Diana Winzenreid =

American politician (born 1983)

Member of the West Virginia House of Delegates from the 4th district
- In office June 7, 2023 – December 1, 2024
- Preceded by: Erikka Storch
- Succeeded by: Bill Flanigan

Personal details
- Born: 1983 (age 42–43)
- Party: Republican
- Education: Indiana University Bloomington

Diana Winzenreid (born 1983) is an American politician from West Virginia. She is a Republican and represented District 4 in the West Virginia House of Delegates from June 7, 2023 to December 1, 2024.

Winzenreid was born in the Ohio Valley an attended high school in Canada, and later graduated in New Jersey. She received a Bachelor of Arts in Political Science from Indiana University Bloomington in 2004 and a Master of Business Administration from Kelley School of Business in 2010.

In 2023, Governor Jim Justice appointed Winzenreid to fill the vacancy created by Erikka Lynn Storch.
