= Josh Holstein =

American politician in West Virginia

Chair of the West Virginia Republican Party
- Incumbent
- Assumed office July 26, 2025
- Preceded by: Matt Herridge

Member of the West Virginia House of Delegates
- Incumbent
- Assumed office December 1, 2020
- Preceded by: Rodney Miller
- Constituency: 23rd district (2020–2023); 32nd district (2023–present)

Personal details
- Born: November 2, 2001 (age 25)
- Party: Republican
- Education: Marshall University (BA)

Josh Holstein (born November 2, 2001) is an American politician serving as a member of the West Virginia House of Delegates from the 32nd district. Elected in November 2020, he assumed office on December 1, 2020. He was re-elected in 2022 and 2024.

He also serves as Chairman of the West Virginia Republican Party and was elected on July 26th, 2025. He is currently the youngest elected member of the Republican National Committee (RNC) to ever serve on the committee and the youngest state party chair in the nation’s history.

== Early life and education ==
Holstein is a native of Ashford, West Virginia. He graduated from Sherman High School and is projected to earn a Bachelor of Arts degree in economics from Marshall University in 2021.

== Career ==
In 2018, Holstein was an intern in the United States House of Representatives. During the 2018 United States Senate elections, he worked as a voter registration coordinator for the West Virginia Republican Party.

Holstein served as chairman of the Boone County Republican Executive Committee and as a member of the West Virginia Republican State Executive Committee from 2019 to 2025. Holstein was a candidate for the West Virginia House of Delegates in 2020. He was featured in a Business Insider piece about young candidates for state legislatures. Holstein did not face an opponent in the Republican primary and defeated Democratic incumbent Rodney Miller in the November general election.

He was elected Chairman of the West Virginia Republican Party on July 26, 2025.

== Political positions ==
=== Donald Trump ===
Holstein is a supporter of President Donald Trump and has publicly endorsed his 2020 and 2024 campaigns. On June 7, 2023, Politico published an article titled, "Trump scores 50 endorsements from the West Virginia state legislature". The article states, "The letter is signed by 50 members total, including 40 West Virginia Delegates and ten Senators. It was organized by Delegate Josh Holstein from Boone County..."

=== Critical Race Theory ===
In 2021 Holstein spoke against Critical Race Theory and stated “I don't want to see future West Virginians and future Americans growing up thinking that everyone is hateful, that everyone is looking to oppress others."

=== Abortion ===
In 2022, the West Virginia Legislature passed HB302 banned abortion in West Virginia with exceptions only for rape, incest, and the life of the mother. On September 13, 2022, Holstein joined 77 other members of the West Virginia House of Delegates by voting in favor of the bill. He was endorsed by West Virginians for Life during the 2020 and 2022 election cycles.

Party political offices
Preceded by Matt Herridge	Chair of the West Virginia Republican Party; 2025–present	Incumbent
