= Dave Foggin =

American politician

Member of the West Virginia House of Delegates from the 14th district
- Incumbent
- Assumed office December 1, 2022
- Preceded by: Johnnie Wamsley

Personal details
- Born: Parkersburg, West Virginia, U.S.
- Party: Republican
- Occupation: High School physics teacher

Dave Foggin is an American politician serving as a member of the West Virginia House of Delegates from the 14th district since 2022.. He is a member of the

== Biography ==
Foggin was born in Parkersburg, West Virginia. He has a B.S. in chemical engineering, a M.A. in secondary education and EMT training. In 2019, he was suspended from his job as a high school teacher for posting a homophobic rant on Facebook.

== Legislative history ==
Foggin cosponsored West Virginia House Bill 2545, a bill introduced on February 18, 2025, that would authorize corporal punishment in public schools.

In February 2026, Foggin was the sole delegate to vote against House Bill 4725, which would criminalize sexual contact with animals.
