= Charlie Reynolds (politician) =

American politician

Member of the West Virginia House of Delegates from the 6th district
- In office December 1, 2022 – October 6, 2023
- Preceded by: David Kelly
- Succeeded by: Jeffrey Stephens

Member of the West Virginia House of Delegates from the 4th district
- In office December 1, 2020 – December 1, 2022
- Preceded by: Joe Canestraro

Personal details
- Born: Charles Foster Reynolds; April 30, 1971 (age 55)
- Party: Republican

Charlie Reynolds (Born April 30, 1971) is an American politician who served in the West Virginia House of Delegates from 2020 to 2023. Reynolds is a Republican.

== Early life, education, and career ==
Reynolds is the son of Charles Foster Reynolds Sr. and Ruth Ann Reynolds. He received his high school diploma from John Marshall High School. Reynolds worked as a railroad terminal manager before seeking public office.

== Elections ==
Reynolds announced his candidacy in 2020, with no prior experience in law or politics. He received the endorsement of the West Virginia Business and Industry Council. Reynolds won unopposed in his primary election.

In a three-way, vote-for-two general election, Reynolds received 35.69% of the vote.

Reynolds resigned in October 2023 after taking a position with the West Virginia Division of Highways.

== Tenure ==
=== Committee assignments ===
- Energy and Manufacturing
- Government Organization
- Veterans Affairs and Homeland Security
- Workforce Development

=== Gun Rights ===
Reynolds is a self-described "gun guy" and a member of the National Rifle Association of America. In the House of Delegates, he was the lead sponsor of HB 2739, a bill that would declare West Virginia a Second Amendment "sanctuary state."

== Personal life ==
Reynolds has two children. Reynolds is a Christian.
