= Wayne Clark (politician) =

American state legislator from West Virginia

Member of the West Virginia House of Representatives from the 99th district
- Incumbent
- Assumed office December 1, 2022

Member of the West Virginia House of Representatives from the 65th district
- In office 2020 – December 1, 2022
- Preceded by: Sammi Brown
- Succeeded by: Carl Martin

Personal details
- Born: February 16, 1972 (age 54) Baltimore, Maryland, U.S.
- Party: Republican
- Spouse: Wendy
- Children: Casey, Mattie, and Meghan
- Education: A.A. Degree
- Alma mater: Community College of Baltimore
- Occupation: Owner of Locust Hill Golf Course

Wayne Clark (born February 16, 1972) is an American politician who represents District 99 in the West Virginia House of Delegates as a Republican. He has been serving in that position since December 1, 2022. He has previously served as the member for the 65th district for 1 2-year term, from 2020 to 2022.

== Biography ==
Clark was born in Baltimore, Maryland to parents Gerald J. Clark Sr. and Barbara Clark. He is the owner of a golf course named Locust Hill Golf Course. He is a Christian.
