= David Adkins (West Virginia politician) =

American politician (born 1961)

Member of the West Virginia House of Representatives from the 30th district
- In office December 1, 2022 – December 1, 2024
- Preceded by: Mick Bates
- Succeeded by: Jeff Eldridge

Personal details
- Born: June 16, 1961 (age 65) West Hamlin, West Virginia, U.S.
- Party: Republican
- Spouse: Tina J Adkins
- Children: 4
- Occupation: Business Owner

David Adkins (born June 16, 1961) is an American politician who was a member of the West Virginia House of Delegates from the 30th district. Elected on November 8, 2022, he assumed office on December 1, 2022, and left office on December 1, 2024.

== Biography ==
Adkins was born in West Hamlin, West Virginia to parents Scott and Goldie Adkins. He is a Christian. He has previously served as the mayor of Hamlin, West Virginia. He is a graduate of Hamlin High School. Outside of politics, he works at Lincoln Contracting.
