= Evan Worrell =

American politician

Member of the West Virginia House of Delegates
- Incumbent
- Assumed office December 1, 2018
- Preceded by: Kelli Sobonya
- Constituency: 23rd district (2022–present); 18th district (2018–2022)

Personal details
- Born: September 26, 1979 (age 46); Myrtle Beach, South Carolina, U.S.
- Party: Republican
- Education: Marshall University (BA)

Evan Worrell (born September 26, 1979) is an American politician serving as a member of the West Virginia House of Delegates from the 23rd district.

== Early life and education ==
Evan Worrell was born in Myrtle Beach, South Carolina to parents Jay and Cheryl Worrell. He earned a Bachelor of Arts degree from Marshall University.

== Career ==
On November 6, 2018, Worrell was elected to the West Virginia House of Delegates, where he represented the 18th district, starting December 1, 2018. In the 2022 general election, Worrell was elected to represent the 23rd district. Worrell is a Republican.

== Personal life ==
Worrell lives in Barboursville, West Virginia. Worrell and his wife, Jennifer, have six children. Worrell is a Baptist.

== Electoral history ==
Election results
Year	Office	Election	Votes for Worrell	%	Opponent	Party	Votes	%
2018	West Virginia House of Delegates	General	3,943	62.7%	Karen Nance	Democratic	2,344	37.3%
2020	West Virginia House of Delegates	General	5,531	69.8%	Paul Ross	Democratic	2,398	30.2%
2022	West Virginia House of Delegates	Primary	787	60.3%	Jodi Biller	Republican	519	39.7%
2022	West Virginia House of Delegates	General	3,028	68.2%	Karen Nance	Democratic	1,413	31.8%
