= Jimmy Willis (politician) =

American politician

Member of the West Virginia House of Representatives from the 3rd district
- Incumbent
- Assumed office December 1, 2022
- Preceded by: redistricting

Personal details
- Party: Republican
- Education: West Liberty University

Jimmy Willis is an American politician serving as a member of the West Virginia House of Delegates from the 3rd district. Elected on November 8, 2022, he assumed office on December 1, 2022.

== Biography ==
Willis is a political science major with a minor in history at West Liberty University.
