= Michael Hornby (politician) =

American politician

Member of the West Virginia House of Representatives from the 93rd district
- Incumbent
- Assumed office December 1, 2022

Personal details
- Born: Chiredzi, Zimbabwe
- Party: Republican
- Occupation: Entrepreneur

Michael Hornby is an American politician serving as a member of the West Virginia House of Delegates from the 93rd district.

== Biography ==
Hornby earned a degree from St. Johns College in 1993. He is a Christian.
