= Eric Brooks (politician) =

American politician

Member of the West Virginia House of Delegates from the 45th district
- Incumbent
- Assumed office December 1, 2022
- Preceded by: Carl Martin

Personal details
- Born: Beckley Appalachian Regional Hospital
- Party: Republican
- Spouse: Jennifer
- Children: Clay, Morgan, Faith Brooks
- Education: Bachelor’s Degree in Sociology and Anthropology
- Alma mater: West Virginia University
- Profession: Retired - Department of Justice - Federal Bureau of Prisons
- Website: Official website

Eric Brooks (born December 24, 1971) is an American politician serving as a member of the West Virginia House of Delegates from the 45th district. Elected on November 8, 2022, he assumed office on December 1, 2022.

== Biography ==
Born on Christmas Eve 1971 in Beckley Appalachian Regional Hospital, to coal miner David Brooks and educator Linda Brooks. He is a baptist. After graduating high school, he obtained a Bachelor's degree in Sociology and Anthropology from West Virginia University in 1994. He married his high school sweetheart, Jennifer, in 1994 and they have 3 kids, Clay, Morgan, and Faith. He worked for the Federal Bureau of Prisons from 1995 to 2021; he is currently retired.
