= Paul Espinosa =

American politician

Speaker pro tempore of the West Virginia House of Delegates
- In office January 11, 2023 – October 8, 2024
- Preceded by: Gary Howell
- Succeeded by: Matthew Rohrbach

Member of the West Virginia House of Delegates
- In office December 1, 2012 – October 8, 2024
- Preceded by: Constituency established
- Succeeded by: Joe Funkhouser
- Constituency: 66th district (2012–2022); 98th district (2022–2024)

Personal details
- Born: Paul Allen Espinosa; April 28, 1962 (age 64) Ranson, West Virginia, U.S.
- Party: Republican
- Education: West Virginia Wesleyan College (BA)
- Website: Campaign website

Paul Allen Espinosa is an American politician and a former Republican member of the West Virginia House of Delegates, serving from 2012 to 2024. He resigned in October 2024 in order to take a position with the West Virginia Racing Commission.

== Education ==
Espinosa earned his bachelor's degree in child services from West Virginia Wesleyan College.

== Elections ==
- 2012: Espinosa was unopposed for the May 8, 2012 Republican Primary, winning with 763 votes, and won the November 6, 2012 General election with 4,233 votes (59.6%) against Democratic nominee John Maxey.
- 2014: Espinosa was re-elected to the House with a victory over opponent Daniel Lutz of the Mountain Party, receiving 77.81% of the vote.
- 2016: Espinosa was once again re-elected, defeating Democratic challenger David Dinges.

West Virginia House of Delegates
Preceded by Gary Howell	Speaker pro tempore of the West Virginia House of Delegates; 2023–2024	Succeeded by Joe Funkhouser
