= Dana Ferrell =

American politician

Member of the West Virginia House of Delegates from the 39th district
- Incumbent
- Assumed office December 1, 2020
- Preceded by: T. Kevan Bartlett

Personal details
- Born: April 17, 1961 (age 65) Charleston, West Virginia, U.S.
- Party: Republican
- Education: West Virginia State University (AAS, BS); Marshall University (MA)

Dana J. Ferrell (born April 17, 1961) is an American politician serving as a member of the West Virginia House of Delegates from the 39th district. He assumed office on December 1, 2020.

== Early life and education ==
Ferrell was born in Charleston, West Virginia in 1961. He earned an Associate of Applied Science in management and marketing and a Bachelor of Science in business education from West Virginia State University, followed by a Master of Arts in special education from Marshall University.

== Career ==
Outside of politics, Ferrell has worked as a teacher and as the president of the RSN Sports Network. He was elected to the West Virginia House of Delegates in November 2020 and assumed office on December 1, 2020.
