= Dean Jeffries (politician) =

American politician in West Virginia

Member of the West Virginia House of Delegates from the 40th district
- Incumbent
- Assumed office September 2018
- Preceded by: Tim Armstead

Personal details
- Born: September 29, 1971 (age 54) Charleston, West Virginia, U.S.
- Party: Republican
- Education: College of Charleston (BAS)

Dean Jeffries (born September 29, 1971) is an American politician serving as a member of the West Virginia House of Delegates from the 40th district. He was appointed in September 2018.

== Early life and education ==
Jeffries was born in Charleston, West Virginia. He earned a Bachelor of Applied Science degree in healthcare administration management from the College of Charleston.

== Career ==
Jeffries began his career as an area manager for Sun Healthcare. He also worked as a coach at Elkview Middle School and Capital High School. He joined State Farm as a field specialist in 2004 and became an insurance agent in 2006. Jeffries was appointed to the West Virginia House of Delegates in September 2018. He has also served as vice chair of the House Health and Human Resources Committee, chair of the House Enrolled Bills Committee, and co-chair of the House Committee on Flooding.
