= Carl Martin (politician) =

American state legislator from West Virginia

Member of the West Virginia House of Representatives from the 65th district
- In office December 1, 2018 – December 1, 2022
- Preceded by: Wayne Clark

Member of the West Virginia House of Representatives from the 45th district
- Incumbent
- Assumed office December 1, 2022
- Preceded by: William Hamilton
- Succeeded by: Eric Brooks

Personal details
- Born: Buckhannon, West Virginia, U.S.
- Party: Republican
- Education: B.S. in business management
- Alma mater: West Virginia Wesleyan College
- Occupation: Business owner

Carl "Robbie" Martin (born April 8, 1991) is an American politician who represents District 65 in the West Virginia House of Delegates as a Republican. He previously served the 45th district from 2018 to 2022. He entered his current office on December 1, 2022.

== Biography ==
Martin was born in Buckhannon, West Virginia to parents Carl J. Martin and Roberta J. Lynch. He is a Christian.
