= David Kelly (politician) =

American politician

Member of the West Virginia House of Delegates from the 8th district
- In office December 1, 2022 – June 15, 2025
- Preceded by: Everette Anderson
- Succeeded by: Bill Bell

Member of the West Virginia House of Delegates from the 6th district
- In office December 1, 2018 – December 1, 2022
- Preceded by: William Romine
- Succeeded by: Charlie Reynolds

Personal details
- Born: David L. Kelly; November 8, 1956 (age 69) Parkersburg, West Virginia, U.S.
- Party: Republican
- Spouse: Jan Kelly
- Education: PhD in Divinity
- Occupation: Sheriff, county commissioner

David Kelly (Born November 8, 1956) is an American politician who served in the West Virginia House of Delegates from 2018 to 2025. Kelly is a Republican.

== Early life, education, and career ==
Kelly was born in Petersburg, West Virginia to Darlene Dotson Kelly and John E. Kelly. He has a PhD in divinity. Kelly served 20 years in law enforcement, including two terms as a sheriff. He also served as the Tyler County commissioner before running to be a delegate.

== Elections ==
=== 2018 ===
In his primary, Kelly defeated fellow Republican Alex King with 53.05% of the vote to earn the nomination.

Kelly defeated Democrat T. Chris Combs and Independent J. Scott Beaver with 67.05% of the vote in the general election.

=== 2020 ===
In his second primary election, Kelly ran unopposed.

Kelly defeated Democrat Cindy Welch with 72.70% of the vote to win reelection in the general election.

== Tenure ==
=== Committee assignments ===
- Select Committee on Prevention and Treatment of Substance Abuse (Chair)
- Agriculture and Natural Resources
- Judiciary
- Veterans Affairs and Homeland Security

Kelly is the Assistant Majority Whip in the Republican-controlled House of Delegates.

Kelly has a 77% lifetime rating from the American Conservative Union. He also has a B− rating from the West Virginia Citizens Defense League, a gun rights organization, as of 2020. Kelly had a 16% rating from the West Virginia chapter of the Sierra Club as of 2020.

In June 2025, Kelly left the House to become the Commissioner of the Division of Corrections and Rehabilitation.

== Personal life ==
Kelly is married to Jan Kelly and has four children. He is a Protestant.
