= Kathie Hess Crouse =

American politician and activist

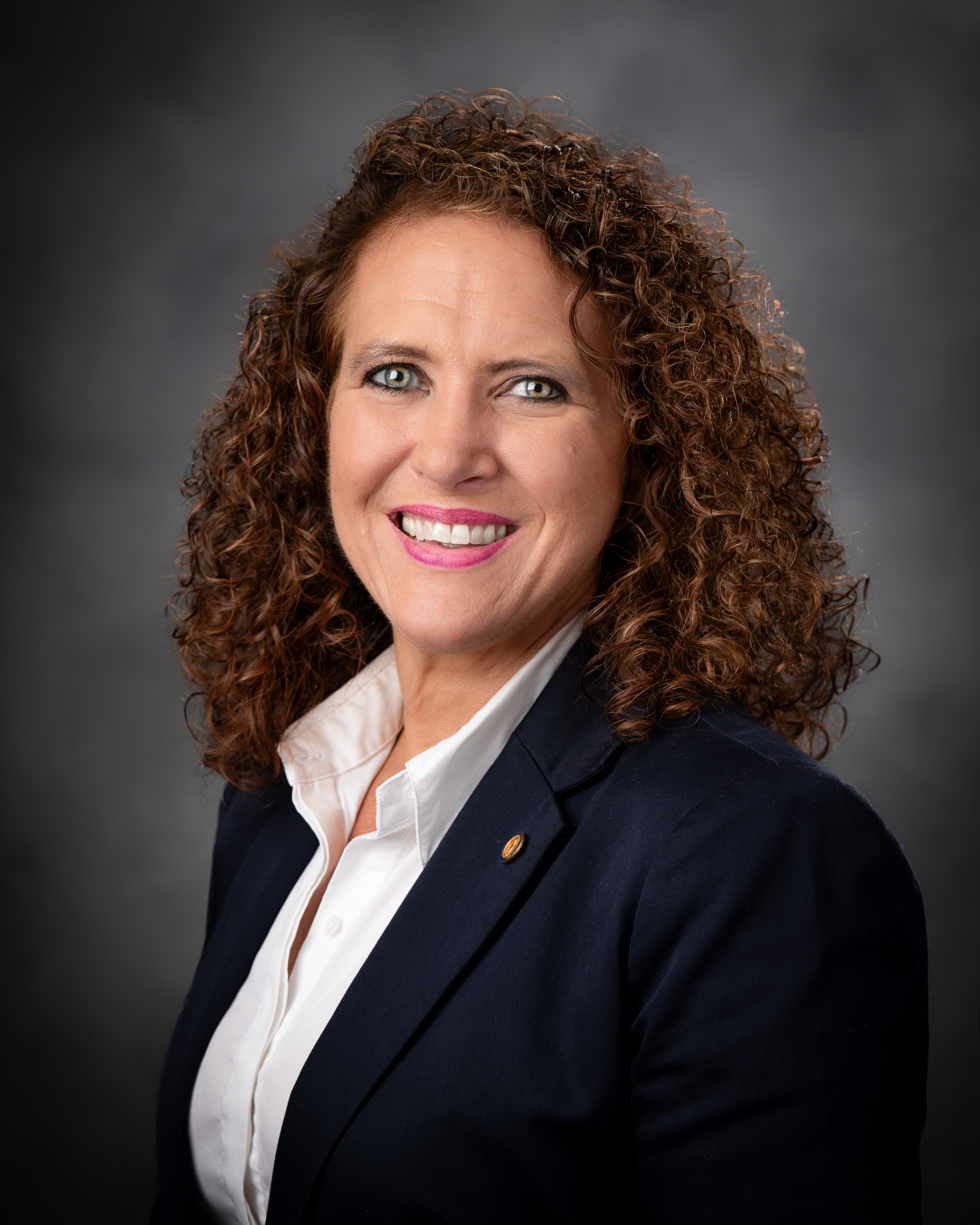

Member of the West Virginia House of Delegates
- Incumbent
- Assumed office December 2, 2021
- Preceded by: Joshua Higginbotham
- Constituency: 19th district (2022–present); 13th district (2021–2022)

Personal details
- Born: Kathryn Hess; December 2, 1969 (age 56) Charleston, West Virginia, U.S.
- Party: Republican
- Spouse: Marc Crouse
- Education: West Virginia State University (AS, BS)

Kathryn Hess Crouse (born December 2, 1969) is an American politician and activist serving as a member of the West Virginia House of Delegates from the 13th district. She was appointed by Governor Jim Justice on December 2, 2021, and was elected in 2022 for the 19th District, which represents a part of Putnam County.

== Early life and education ==
Born and raised in Charleston, West Virginia, Crouse earned an associate degree in science and bachelor of science degree in microbiology and molecular biology from West Virginia State University.

== Career ==
From 1998 to 2001, Crouse managed a Steak Escape restaurant. After earning her bachelor's degree, she worked as an analytical technician for Dow Chemical Company. From 2001 to 2004, she served as a microbiologist in the West Virginia Office of Laboratory Services. She was an unsuccessful candidate for the Putnam County Board of Education in 2010 and West Virginia House of Delegates in 2016. Crouse has been the president of the West Virginia Home Educators Association and a commissioner of the West Virginia State Athletic Commission. She was also a board member of the Putnam County Convention and Visitors Bureau. Crouse was appointed to the West Virginia House of Delegates in December 2021, and later elected in 2022 to the new 19th District.

== Personal life ==
Crouse lives in Buffalo, West Virginia.
