= Phil Mallow =

American politician (born 1957)

Member of the West Virginia House of Representatives from the 75th district
- Incumbent
- Assumed office December 1, 2022

Member of the West Virginia House of Representatives from the 50th district
- In office 2020 – December 1, 2022

Personal details
- Born: July 6, 1957 (age 69) Cumberland, Maryland, US
- Party: Republican
- Spouse: Pamela Raye
- Children: 2
- Education: Allegany College of Maryland

Phil Mallow (born July 6, 1957) is an American politician serving as a member of the West Virginia House of Delegates.

== Early and personal life ==
Born July 6, 1957, in Cumberland, Maryland, Mallow earned a degree in quality control technology from Allegany College of Maryland in 1977. He worked for United Parcel Service from 1979 to 2012. He is a Baptist.

== Electoral history ==
Mallow first ran for the 50th district in the 2014 West Virginia House of Delegates election but lost. He lost again in the 2016 West Virginia House of Delegates election. He lost again in the 2018 West Virginia House of Delegates election. He first won an election in the 2020 West Virginia House of Delegates election. He was redistricted to the 75th district in the 2022 West Virginia House of Delegates election. He won the Republican primary and is the party's nominee in the 2024 West Virginia House of Delegates election.
