= Chris Phillips (West Virginia politician) =

American politician

Member of the West Virginia House of Delegates for the 68th District

Member of the West Virginia House of Representatives
- Incumbent
- Assumed office 2019
- Preceded by: Danny Wagner

Personal details
- Born: October 8, 1969 (age 56) Buckhannon, West Virginia, U.S.
- Party: Republican

Chris Phillips (born October 8, 1969) is an American politician who was elected to the West Virginia House of Delegates in 2018 as a Republican. He represents District 68.

== Early life ==
Phillips was born in Buckhannon, West Virginia and attended Philip Barbour High School in Barbour County, West Virginia.

== Political career ==
Phillips was elected to the West Virginia House of Delegates in 2018.
