= George Miller (West Virginia politician) =

American politician

Member of the West Virginia House of Representatives from the 90th district
- Incumbent
- Assumed office December 1, 2022
- Preceded by: Redistricted

Member of the West Virginia House of Representatives from the 58th district
- In office December 1, 2020 – December 1, 2022
- Preceded by: Daryl Cowles
- Succeeded by: Walter Hall

Personal details
- Born: November 27, 1952 (age 73)
- Party: Republican
- Spouse: Barbara Ann Miller

George Miller (born November 27, 1952) is an American politician serving as a member of the West Virginia House of Delegates from the 90th district since 2022. He previously represented the 58th district for one term starting in 2020.

== Biography ==
Miller was born in East Stroudsburg, Pennsylvania to Paul and Betty Miller, and graduated from East Stroudsburg Area High School. He is a United Methodist.
