= Margitta Mazzocchi =

American politician

Member of the West Virginia House of Delegates from the 24th district
- Incumbent
- Assumed office December 1, 2020

Personal details
- Born: Margitta Schaaf; January 5, 1963 (age 63) Stolberg, West Germany
- Party: Republican
- Spouse: Eugene Mazzocchi
- Children: 2
- Education: University of Koblenz and Landau (Dipl.)

Margitta Mazzocchi (née Schaaf, born January 5 1963) is a German-born American politician serving as a member of the West Virginia House of Delegates from the 24th district. Elected in November 2020, she assumed office on December 1, 2020.

== Early life and education ==
Mazzocchi was born in Stolberg, West Germany. After her Abitur at Trifels-Gymnasium, she earned a Diplom in education from the University of Koblenz and Landau.

== Career ==
Since moving to the United States, Mazzocchi has worked as the office manager and billing officer for Life Solutions Counseling Services. She also managed a photography studio and worked as a teacher at the Recovery Group of Southern West Virginia.

== Personal life ==
Mazzocchi and her husband, Eugene, have two children, Marco and Mara. She became a naturalized citizen of the United States in 2017.
