= Roger Hanshaw =

American politician (born 1980)

Speaker of the West Virginia House of Delegates
- Incumbent
- Assumed office August 29, 2018
- Preceded by: Tim Armstead

Member of the West Virginia House of Delegates
- Incumbent
- Assumed office December 1, 2014
- Preceded by: David Walker
- Constituency: 33rd district (2014–2022); 62nd district (2022–present)

Personal details
- Born: March 24, 1980 (age 46) Charleston, West Virginia, U.S.
- Party: Republican
- Spouse: Ermel ‘Kirsten’ Hanshaw (? - present)
- Children: 2
- Education: West Virginia University, Morgantown (BS, JD); University of Notre Dame (PhD)

Roger Hanshaw (born March 24, 1980) is an American politician from West Virginia who currently serves as the Speaker of the West Virginia House of Delegates, in office since August 2018.

== West Virginia House of Delegates ==
Hanshaw was first elected to the West Virginia House of Delegates during the 2014 election cycle, defeating incumbent Democrat David Walker with 54.7% of the vote, to Walker's 45.3%.

Hanshaw condemned Delegate Derrick Evans's actions in the January 6 United States Capitol attack.

West Virginia House of Delegates
Preceded by David Walker	Member of the West Virginia House of Delegates from the 33rd district 2015–present	Incumbent
Political offices		Incumbent
Preceded by John Overington; Acting	Speaker of the West Virginia House of Delegates; 2018–present	Incumbent
