= 2016 West Virginia House of Delegates election =

- November 8, 2016

All 100 seats in the West Virginia House of Delegates 51 seats needed for a majority
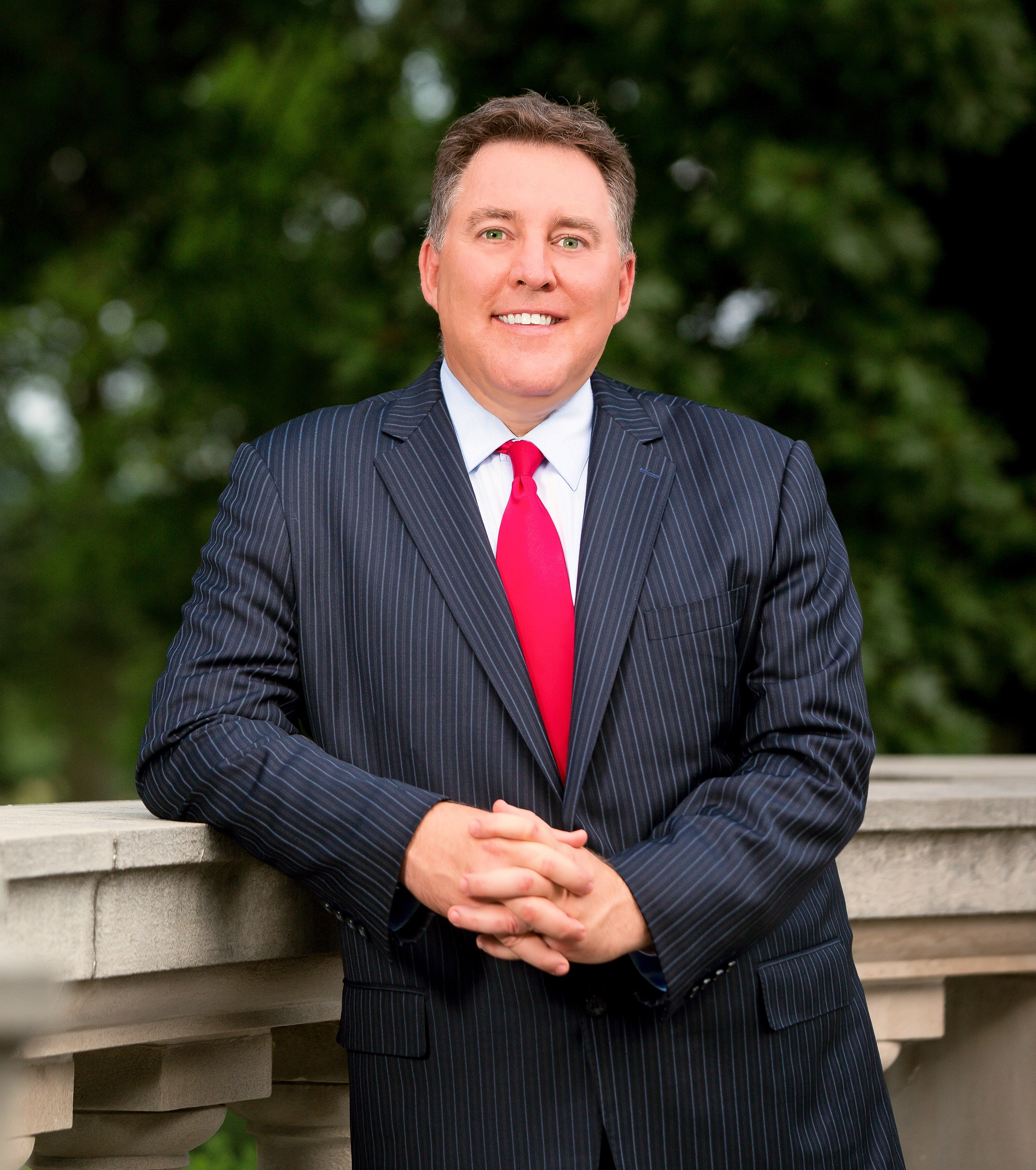
| | Majority party | Minority party |
|---|---|---|
| Leader | Tim Armstead | Tim Miley |
| Party | Republican | Democratic |
| Leader since | January 14, 2015 | January 9, 2013 |
| Leader's seat | 40th district | 48th district |
| Seats before | 64 | 36 |
| Seats won | 63 | 37 |
| Seat change | ▼1 | ▲1 |
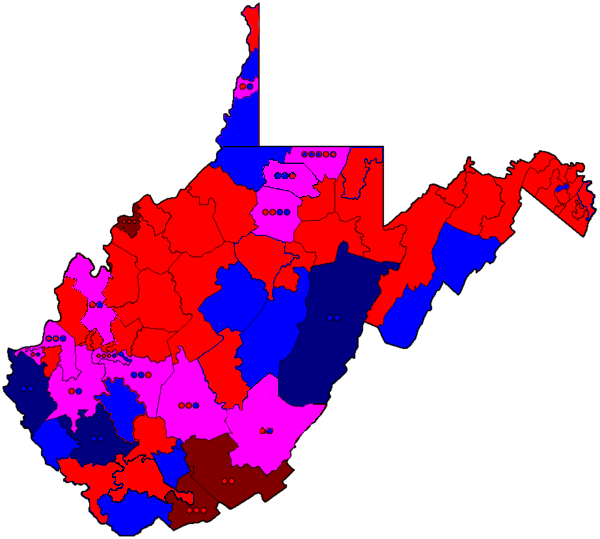
- District colors: Democratic (1+) Republican (1+) Democratic (1) Republican (1) Split delegation
Speaker before election
Tim Armstead
Republican
Elected Speaker
Tim Armstead
Republican

Elections to the West Virginia House of Delegates took place on November 8, 2016. All 100 seats in the West Virginia House of Delegates were up for election, with 13 Republican and 8 Democratic incumbents not running for re-election. The Republican majority sustained a net loss of 1 seat, decreasing the majority from 64 seats to 63. This soon changed when Democrat Rupert Phillips Jr. switched party affiliation to Independent in January 2017, and then to Republican in May 2017 reestablishing the 64–36 majority from 2014.

== Members ==
| District | Representatives |
|---|---|
| District 1 (2 seats) | Pat McGeehan (Republican) Mark Zatezalo (Republican) |
| District 2 | Phil Diserio (Democratic) |
| District 3 (2 seats) | Erikka Lynn Storch (Republican) Shawn Fluharty (Democratic) |
| District 4 (2 seats) | Joe Canestraro (Democratic) Michael Ferro (Democratic) |
| District 5 | Dave Pethtel (Democratic) |
| District 6 | William Romine (Republican) |
| District 7 | Jason Harshbarger (Republican) |
| District 8 | Bill Anderson (Republican) |
| District 9 | Ray Hollen (Republican) |
| District 10 (3 seats) | Vernon Criss (Republican) John R. Kelly (Republican) Frank Deem (Republican) |
| District 11 | Martin Atkinson III (Republican) |
| District 12 | Steve Westfall (Republican) |
| District 13 (2 seats) | Joshua Higginbotham (Republican) Scott Brewer (Democratic) |
| District 14 | Jim Butler (Republican) |
| District 15 | Geoff Foster (Republican) |
| District 16 (3 seats) | Sean Hornbuckle (Democratic) Carol Miller (Republican) Chuck Romine (Republican) |
| District 17 (2 seats) | Matthew Rohrbach (Republican) Chad Lovejoy (Democratic) |
| District 18 | Kelli Sobonya (Republican) |
| District 19 (2 seats) | Kenneth Hicks (Democratic) Robert Thompson (Democratic) |
| District 20 | Justin Marcum (Democratic) |
| District 21 | Mark Dean (Republican) |
| District 22 (2 seats) | Zack Maynard (Republican) Jeff Eldridge (Democratic) |
| District 23 | Rodney Miller (Democratic) |
| District 24 (2 seats) | Ralph Rodighiero (Democratic) Rupie Phillips (Democratic) |
| District 25 | Tony Paynter (Republican) |
| District 26 | Ed Evans (Republican) |
| District 27 (3 seats) | Joe Ellington (Republican) John Shott (Republican) Marty Gearheart (Republican) |
| District 28 (2 seats) | Roy Cooper (Republican) John O'Neal (Republican) |
| District 29 | Rick Moye (Democratic) |
| District 30 | Mick Bates (Democratic) |
| District 31 | Lynne Arvon (Republican) |
| District 32 (3 seats) | Tom Fast (Republican) Kayla Kessinger (Republican) Shirley Love (Democratic) |
| District 33 | Roger Hanshaw (Republican) |
| District 34 | Brent Boggs (Democratic) |
| District 35 (4 seats) | Moore Capito (Republican) Eric Nelson (Republican) Andrew Byrd (Democratic) Charlotte Lane (Republican) |
| District 36 (3 seats) | Andrew Robinson (Democratic) Larry Rowe (Democratic) Brad White (Republican) |
| District 37 | Mike Pushkin (Democratic) |
| District 38 | Nancy Reagan Foster (Republican) |
| District 39 | Ronald Walters (Republican) |
| District 40 | Tim Armstead (Republican) |
| District 41 | Jordan Hill (Republican) |
| District 42 (2 seats) | George Ambler (Republican) Stephen Baldwin (Democratic) |
| District 43 (2 seats) | William G. Hartman (Democratic) Phil Isner (Democratic) |
| District 44 | Dana Lynch (Democratic) |
| District 45 | William Hamilton (Republican) |
| District 46 | Patrick S. Martin (Republican) |
| District 47 | Danny Wagner (Republican) |
| District 48 (4 seats) | Danny Hamrick (Republican) Ben Queen (Republican) Richard Iaquinta (Democratic) Timothy Miley (Democratic) |
| District 49 | Amy Summers (Republican) |
| District 50 (3 seats) | Mike Caputo (Democratic) Linda Longstreth (Democratic) Guy Ward (Republican) |
| District 51 (5 seats) | Barbara Fleischauer (Democratic) Rodney Pyles (Democratic) John Williams (Democratic) Cindy Frich (Republican) Joe Statler (Republican) |
| District 52 | Terri Funk Sypolt (Republican) |
| District 53 | Tony Lewis (Republican) |
| District 54 | Allen Evans (Republican) |
| District 55 | Isaac Sponaugle (Democratic) |
| District 56 | Gary Howell (Republican) |
| District 57 | Ruth Rowan (Republican) |
| District 58 | Daryl Cowles (Republican) |
| District 59 | Saira Blair (Republican) |
| District 60 | S. Marshall Wilson (Republican) |
| District 61 | Jason Barrett (Democratic) |
| District 62 | John Overington (Republican) |
| District 63 | Michael Folk (Republican) |
| District 64 | Eric Householder (Republican) |
| District 65 | Jill Upson (Republican) |
| District 66 | Paul Espinosa (Republican) |
| District 67 | Riley Moore (Republican) |

== Results by district ==
=== District 35 ===
West Virginia House of Delegates District 35 election, 2016
| Party | Candidate | Votes | % |
|---|---|---|---|
| Republican | Moore Capito | 14,822 | 16.67% |
| Democratic | Andrew Byrd (incumbent) | 13,546 | 15.23% |
| Republican | Eric Nelson (incumbent) | 11,881 | 13.36% |
| Republican | Charlotte Lane | 10,505 | 11.81% |
| Republican | Keith Pauley | 10,251 | 11.53% |
| Democratic | Ben Adams | 9,899 | 11.13% |
| Democratic | Thornton Cooper | 9,404 | 10.57% |
| Democratic | Benjamin M. Sheridan | 8,628 | 9.70% |
| Total votes | | 88,936 | 100.00% |
| Republican hold | | | |
| Democratic hold | | | |
| Republican hold | | | |
| Republican hold | | | |
