= 2018 United States Senate election in West Virginia =

- November 6, 2018
- Turnout: 47.04% ▲
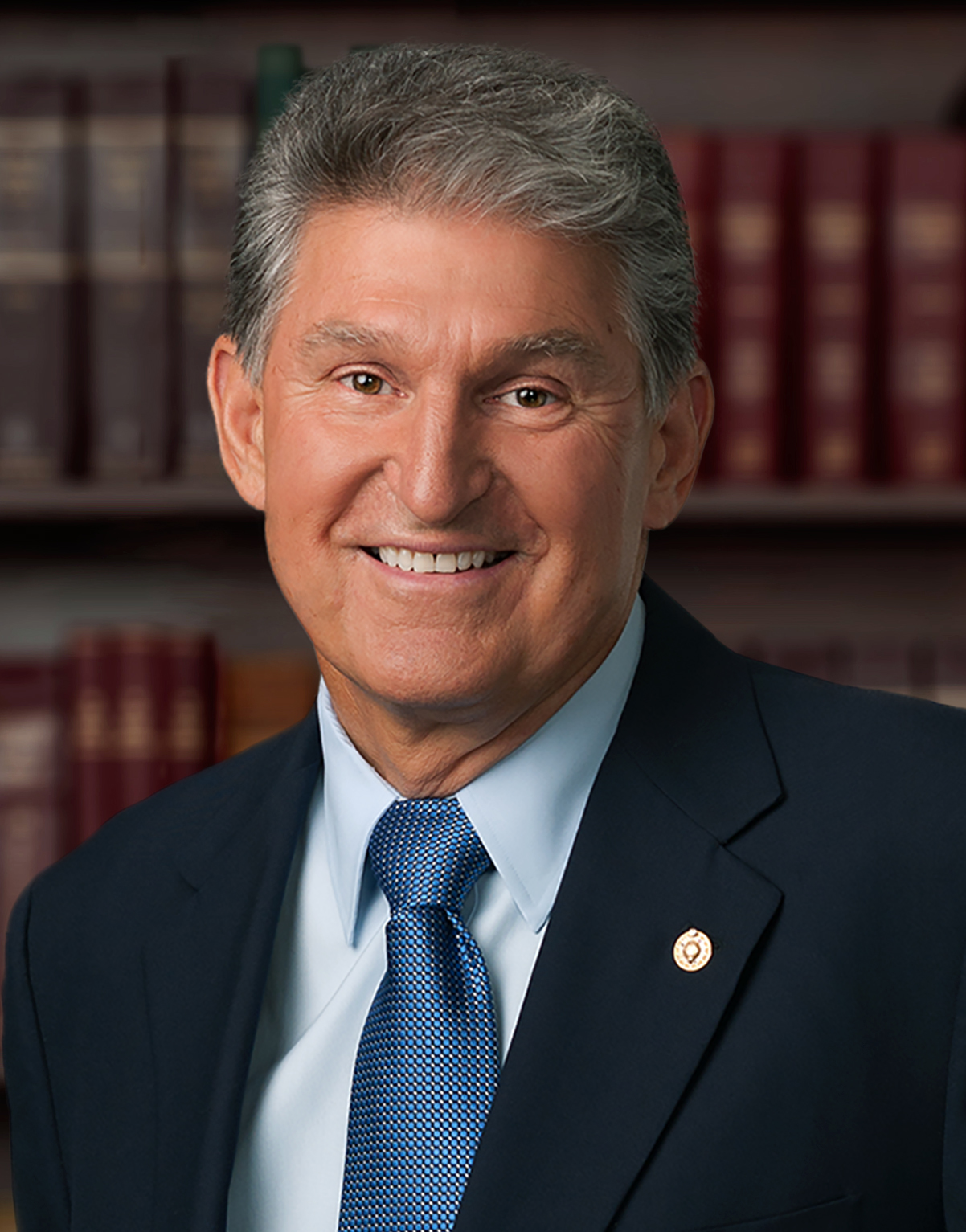

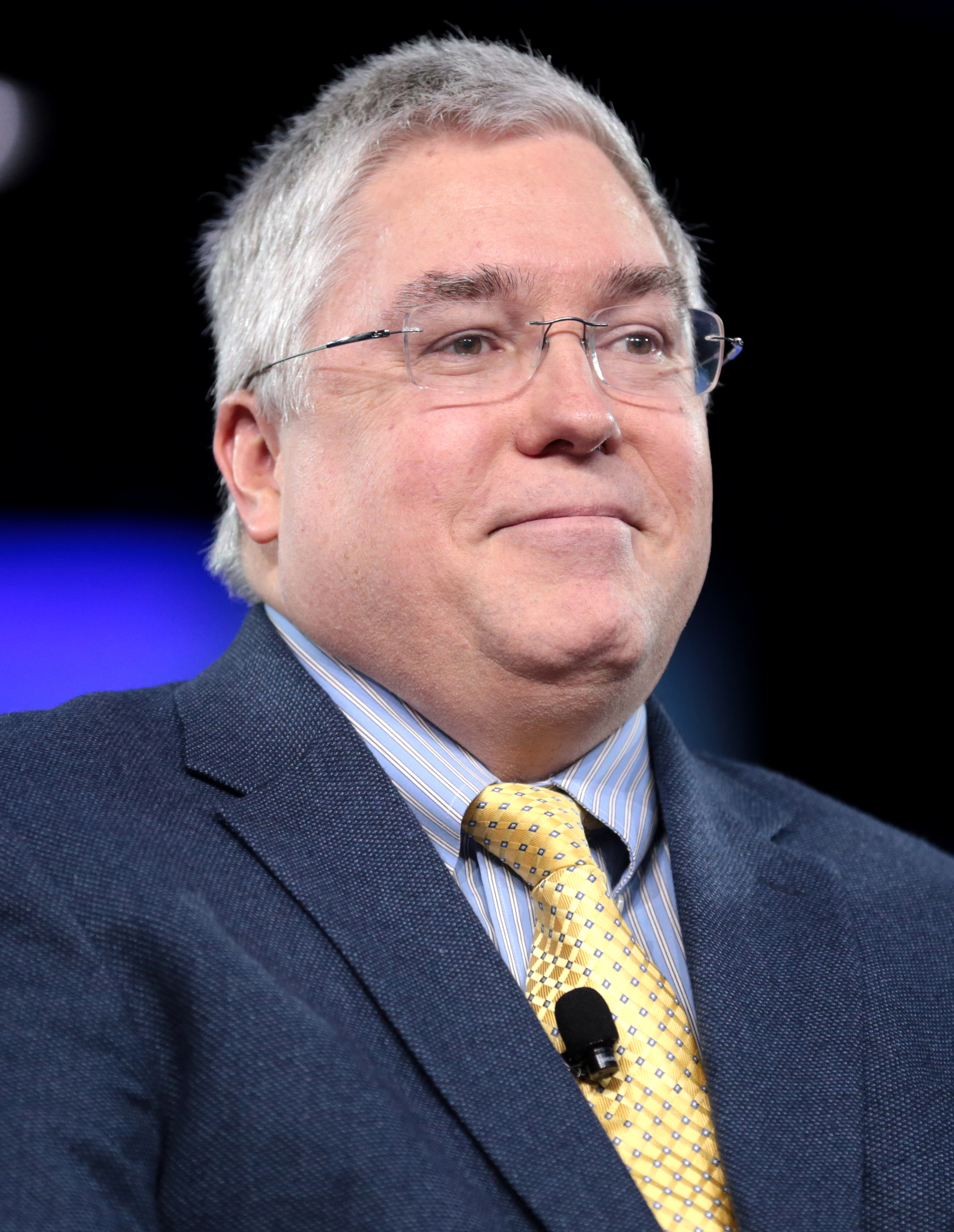
Nominee	Joe Manchin	Patrick Morrisey
Party	Democratic	Republican
Popular vote	290,510	271,113
Percentage	49.57%	46.26%
- Manchin: 40–50% 50–60% 60–70% 70–80% 80–90% Morrisey: 40–50% 50–60% 60–70% 70–80% 80–90%
U.S. senator before election
Joe Manchin
Democratic
Elected U.S. Senator
Joe Manchin
Democratic

The 2018 United States Senate election in West Virginia took place on November 6, 2018, to elect a member of the United States Senate to represent the State of West Virginia, concurrently with other elections to the United States Senate, elections to the United States House of Representatives, and various state and local elections. Incumbent Democratic Senator Joe Manchin won re-election to a second full term against Republican Patrick Morrisey, who at the time of the 2018 elections had been West Virginia's State Attorney General since 2013. This was one of ten Democratic-held Senate seats up for election in a state won by Donald Trump in the 2016 presidential election. Morrisey conceded on election night.

Manchin was considered to be among the most vulnerable Democratic senators facing re-election in 2018 due to the state's deepening partisan lean and his declining popularity. He ultimately won a second full term, though by a much narrower margin of 3.33% compared to his 2012 landslide, losing 28 counties he won in 2012 and outperforming the margins of defeat from both Barack Obama in 2012 and Hillary Clinton in 2016 by more than 40%.

As of 2026, this is the last time that a Democrat won a congressional or statewide election in West Virginia, the only general election defeat of Morrisey's career, and the last West Virginia U.S. Senate race where the winner received less than 58% of votes. Following his defeat in this election, Morrisey continued to serve as West Virginia's state attorney general until he won the 2024 West Virginia gubernatorial election and took office as the state's governor on January 13, 2025.

== Background ==
West Virginia has not voted for a Democratic presidential nominee since 1996. The last presidential race where the Republican nominee did not win every county in West Virginia was in 2008. From 1959 to 2015, West Virginia was exclusively represented in the U.S. Senate by Democrats.

Manchin was first elected to the U.S. Senate in a 2010 special election, defeating Republican challenger John Raese. Manchin defeated Raese a second time in 2012 to win his first full term in the Senate, receiving more than 60% of the vote and carrying all but three counties.

In 2016, Donald Trump won the state by a greater than 40-point margin over Hillary Clinton (68–26%), with Clinton's performance being the worst for either party in the state's history. Trump also won every county in the state.

Concurrent with Trump's landslide 2016 victory in West Virginia, Democratic businessman Jim Justice won the gubernatorial election with 49% of the vote but changed his party affiliation back to Republican within a year (Justice had previously been a Republican prior to running as a Democrat for governor). Democrats lost almost every statewide office in the state in 2016, with State Treasurer John Perdue being the only statewide Democrat re-elected.

Because of the heavy Republican lean of his state, Manchin was ranked by many outlets as one of the most vulnerable incumbents up for reelection. President Trump headlined three rallies in the state on behalf of Manchin's opponent Patrick Morrisey. Manchin's vote to confirm Judge Brett Kavanaugh in his highly contentious confirmation hearing, making him the only Democrat to do so, garnered national attention and backlash from members of his own party just weeks before the midterm elections. Despite the challenges to his re-election, Manchin leaned into his close personal ties to the state and emphasized his moderate to conservative views.

Although Manchin was seen as vulnerable during the lead-up to the election, polling considered him to be a slight favorite for most of the general election cycle.

== Democratic primary ==
=== Candidates ===
==== Nominee ====
- Joe Manchin, incumbent U.S. senator

==== Eliminated in primary ====
- Paula Jean Swearengin, social and environmental activist

=== Endorsements ===
Paula Jean Swearengin

State legislators

- Charlotte Pritt, former state senator from the 17th district (1988–1992) and 1996 Democratic nominee and 2016 Mountain Party nominee for governor (Mountain)

Individuals

- Tim Canova, founder of Progress For All
- Carol Hechler, widow of former West Virginia Secretary of State Ken Hechler
- Cenk Uygur, host of The Young Turks

Organizations

- Brand New Congress
- Justice Democrats
- The People for Bernie Sanders
- Upshur County Indivisible

=== Polling ===
Poll source	Date(s) administered	Joe Manchin	Paula Jean Swearengin	Undecided
SurveyMonkey (D-Swearengin)	September 2017	46%	8%	38%

Campaign finance reports as of September 30, 2018
Candidate (party)	Total receipts	Total disbursements	Cash on hand
Joe Manchin (D)	$8,872,162	$6,459,930	$4,200,530
Paula Jean Swearengin (D)	$219,707	$190,099	$29,608
Source: Federal Election Commission

=== Results ===
Results by county: Manchin: 50–60%; 60–70%; 70–80%

Democratic primary results
Party	Candidate	Votes	%
Democratic	Joe Manchin (incumbent)	112,658	69.86%
Democratic	Paula Jean Swearengin	48,594	30.14%
Total votes		161,252	100%

== Republican primary ==
=== Candidates ===
==== Nominee ====
- Patrick Morrisey, attorney general of West Virginia

==== Eliminated in primary ====
- Don Blankenship, former chairman and CEO of Massey Energy
- Bo Copley, coal miner
- Evan Jenkins, U.S. representative for West Virginia's 3rd congressional district (2015–2018)
- Jack Newbrough, truck driver and navy veteran
- Tom Willis, Army veteran

==== Declined ====
- Ryan Ferns, majority leader of the West Virginia Senate (running for re-election)
- David McKinley, U.S. representative for West Virginia's 1st congressional district (2011–2023) (running for re-election)
- Alex Mooney, U.S. representative for West Virginia's 2nd congressional district (2015–2025) (ran for re-election)

=== Endorsements ===
Evan Jenkins

State officials

- John McCuskey, auditor of West Virginia

Organizations

- Huntington Regional Chamber of Commerce
- West Virginia Chamber of Commerce

Newspapers

- Charleston Daily Mail

=== Debates ===
Host network	Date	Link(s)	Participants					
Host network	Date	Link(s)	Evan Jenkins	Patrick Morrisey	Don Blankenship	Bo Copley	Jack Newbrough	Tom Willis
Fox News	May 1, 2018		Invited	Invited	Invited	–	–	–
WVPB	April 23, 2018		Invited	Invited	Invited	Invited	Invited	Invited

=== Polling ===
Poll source	Date(s) administered	Sample size	Margin of error	Don Blankenship	Evan Jenkins	Patrick Morrisey	Other	Undecided
Public Opinion Strategies (R-Morrisey)	April 22–23, 2018	500	± 4.4%	15%	26%	28%	–	18%
Fox News	April 18–22, 2018	985	± 3.0%	16%	25%	21%	8%	24%
National Research Inc. (R-GOPAC)	April 17–19, 2018	411	± 4.9%	12%	20%	24%	5%	39%
Osage Research (R-Morrisey)	March 13, 2018	500	± 4.4%	23%	17%	24%	4%	–
Harper Polling (R-Jenkins)	March 5–6, 2018	400	–	27%	29%	19%	10%	15%
Harper Polling (R-Jenkins)	February 5–6, 2018	500	± 4.4%	18%	33%	25%	12%	12%
Harper Polling (R-Jenkins)	February 5–6, 2018	500	± 4.4%	–	42%	36%	–	22%
Fabrizio, Lee and Associates (R-35th PAC)	October 19–22, 2017	400	± 4.9%	–	34%	40%	–	26%

=== Results ===
Results by county: Morrisey: Morrisey—70–80%; Morrisey—60–70%; Morrisey—50–60%; Morrisey—40–50%; Morrisey—30–40%; Morrisey—<30%; Jenkins: Jenkins—30–40%; Jenkins—40–50%; Jenkins—50–60%; Jenkins—60–70%; Blankenship: Blankenship—<30%; Blankenship—30–40%; Blankenship—40–50%

Republican primary results
Party	Candidate	Votes	%
Republican	Patrick Morrisey	48,007	34.90%
Republican	Evan Jenkins	40,185	29.21%
Republican	Don Blankenship	27,478	19.97%
Republican	Tom Willis	13,540	9.84%
Republican	Bo Copley	4,248	3.09%
Republican	Jack Newbrough	4,115	2.99%
Total votes		137,573	100%

== Libertarian Party ==
=== Candidates ===
==== Nominated ====
- Rusty Hollen

== Constitution Party ==
=== Candidates ===
==== Denied ballot access ====
- Don Blankenship, former chairman and CEO of Massey Energy. Observers noted that he would be ineligible to run due to West Virginia's sore-loser law which states that the loser of a partisan primary election cannot appear on the ballot as an independent or with another political party in the general election. Blankenship was eligible to run as a write-in candidate. Secretary of State Mac Warner denied ballot access to Blankenship's campaign on July 26, citing West Virginia's "sore loser" law. After a lawsuit, the Supreme Court of Appeals of West Virginia ordered Warner to deny Blankenship ballot access on August 29, 2018.

=== Endorsements ===
Don Blankenship

Organizations

- Constitution Party of West Virginia

== General election ==
=== Candidates ===
- Mark Brazaitis (Independent, write-in), author and deputy mayor of Morgantown, West Virginia

=== Predictions ===
Source	Ranking	As of
The Cook Political Report	Lean D	October 26, 2018
Inside Elections	Tilt D	November 1, 2018
Sabato's Crystal Ball	Lean D	November 5, 2018
CNN	Lean D	November 5, 2018
RealClearPolitics	Tossup	November 5, 2018
Daily Kos	Lean D	November 5, 2018
Fox News	Lean D	November 5, 2018
FiveThirtyEight	Likely D	November 6, 2018

=== Endorsements ===
Joe Manchin (D)

U.S. senators

- Al Franken, former U.S. senator (MN)
- Amy Klobuchar, U.S. senator (MN)
- Elizabeth Warren, U.S. senator (MA)

Labor unions

- American Federation of Teachers, West Virginia affiliate
- Jackson County Education Association
- United Automobile Workers
- United Mine Workers of America
- West Virginia AFL–CIO
- West Virginia Education Association
- West Virginia State Building and Construction Trades Council, AFL-CIO

Organizations

- Democrats for Life of America
- Huntington Regional Chamber of Commerce
- National Committee to Preserve Social Security and Medicare

Individuals

- Bob Huggins, basketball coach for the West Virginia University
- Nick Saban, college football coach for the University of Alabama
- Jerry West, former NBA player

Newspapers

- The Sunday News-Register
Patrick Morrisey (R)

U.S. executive branch officials

- Mike Pence, 48th vice president of the United States
- Donald Trump, 45th president of the United States

U.S. senators

- Shelley Moore Capito, U.S. senator (WV)
- Ted Cruz, U.S. senator (TX)
- Rand Paul, U.S. senator (KY)
- David Perdue, U.S. senator (GA)

U.S. representatives

- Evan Jenkins (WV-03)
- David McKinley (WV-01)
- Alex Mooney (WV-02)

U.S. governors

- Jim Justice, governor of West Virginia
- Scott Walker, governor of Wisconsin

State senators

- Mike Azinger, state senator
- Craig Blair, state senator
- Eric Householder, state senator
- Patricia Rucker, state senator
- Randy Smith, state senator
- Charles S. Trump, state senator

State delegates

- Karen Arvon, state delegate
- Jim Butler, state delegate
- Vernon Criss, state delegate
- Paul Espinosa, state delegate
- Michael Folk, state delegate
- Geoff Foster, state delegate
- Nancy Reagan Foster, state delegate
- Danny Hamrick, state delegate
- Joshua Higginbotham, state delegate
- Jordan Hill, state delegate
- Ray Hollen, state delegate
- Gary Howell, state delegate
- John R. Kelly, state delegate
- Tony J. Lewis, state delegate
- Patrick S. Martin, state delegate
- Pat McGeehan, state delegate
- John Overington, state delegate
- Tony Paynter, state delegate
- William Romine, state delegate
- Ruth Rowan, state delegate
- Jill Upson, state delegate
- Ron Walters, state delegate
- Guy Ward, state delegate
- S. Marshall Wilson, state delegate

Organizations

- American Conservative Union
- Family Policy Council of West Virginia
- FreedomWorks
- Great America Alliance
- Gun Owners of America
- NRA Political Victory Fund
- Republican Jewish Coalition
- Senate Conservatives Fund
- Students For Trump
- Tea Party Patriots
- U.S. Chamber of Commerce
- West Virginia Citizens Defense League
- West Virginia Coal Association
- West Virginians for Life

Individuals

- Don Blankenship, former Massey Energy CEO
- Dinesh D'Souza, conservative political commentator, author and filmmaker
- Sebastian Gorka, former deputy assistant to the president
- Donald Trump Jr., businessman and son of U.S. President Donald Trump

Newspapers

- National Review

=== Fundraising ===
Campaign finance reports as of September 30, 2018
Candidate (party)	Total receipts	Total disbursements	Cash on hand
Joe Manchin (D)	$8,872,162	$6,459,930	$4,200,530
Patrick Morrisey (R)	$4,943,056	$3,315,300	$1,627,756
Source: Federal Election Commission

=== Polling ===
View source data.

Poll source	Date(s) administered	Sample size	Margin of error	Joe Manchin (D)	Patrick Morrisey (R)	Rusty Hollen (L)	Other	Undecided
Emerson College	October 28–31, 2018	1,013	± 3.2%	47%	42%	3%	–	8%
Research America Inc.	October 19–30, 2018	400	± 4.9%	45%	40%	11%	–	5%
Strategic Research Associates	October 12–19, 2018	650	± 3.8%	52%	36%	4%	–	8%
Fabrizio, Lee and Associates (R-NRSC)	October 16–18, 2018	600	± 4.0%	42%	44%	3%	–	12%
Fabrizio, Lee and Associates (R-NRSC)	October 16–18, 2018	600	± 4.0%	45%	47%	–	–	8%
Vox Populi Polling	October 13–15, 2018	789	± 3.5%	53%	47%	–	–	–
The Polling Company (R-Citizens United)	October 11–13, 2018	600	± 4.0%	49%	45%	–	2%	3%
Public Opinion Strategies (R-NRSC)	October 7–9, 2018	600	± 4.0%	41%	40%	8%	–	–
Strategic Research Associates	September 17–26, 2018	650	± 3.8%	46%	38%	3%	–	13%
1892 Polling (R-Morrisey)	September 24–25, 2018	500	± 4.4%	45%	45%	–	–	10%
The Tarrance Group (R-SLF)	September 23–25, 2018	612	± 4.1%	47%	43%	5%	–	5%
Global Strategy Group (D-Manchin)	September 19–23, 2018	601	± 4.0%	48%	36%	4%	–	–
Emerson College	September 13–15, 2018	825	± 3.5%	45%	33%	–	6%	16%
Harper Polling (R-35th PAC)	August 23–26, 2018	600	± 4.0%	47%	41%	–	–	12%
Research America Inc.	August 16–26, 2018	404	± 4.9%	46%	38%	–	–	16%
Trafalgar Group (R)	July 13–16, 2018	1,158	± 2.9%	50%	40%	2%	–	8%
SurveyMonkey/Axios	June 11 – July 2, 2018	892	± 5.5%	53%	40%	–	–	6%
Monmouth University	June 14–19, 2018	653	± 3.8%	49%	42%	–	3%	6%
Public Policy Polling	June 12–13, 2018	633	–	49%	42%	–	–	9%
Hart Research Associates (D-DSCC)	May 15–16, 2018	602	± 4.0%	52%	40%	–	–	–
Global Strategy Group (D-Manchin)	May 13–16, 2018	600	± 4.0%	50%	42%	–	–	–
Global Strategy Group (D-Manchin)	May 13–16, 2018	600	± 4.0%	47%	40%	4%	–	–
WPA Intelligence (R)	May 10, 2018	400	± 4.9%	44%	46%	–	–	11%
Zogby Analytics	September 27–30, 2017	320	± 5.5%	45%	38%	–	–	17%
Research America Inc.	August 11–20, 2017	400	± 4.9%	51%	37%	–	–	12%
Harper Polling	November 16–17, 2016	500	± 4.4%	57%	35%	–	–	8%

Hypothetical polling

with Don Blankenship

Poll source	Date(s) administered	Sample size	Margin of error	Joe Manchin (D)	Patrick Morrisey (R)	Don Blankenship (C)	Other	Undecided
Research America Inc.	August 16–26, 2018	404	± 4.9%	45%	34%	8%	–	13%
Monmouth University	June 14–19, 2018	653	± 3.8%	48%	39%	4%	2%	6%
Public Policy Polling	June 12–13, 2018	633	–	46%	35%	11%	–	7%
Gravis Marketing	May 22, 2018	543	± 4.2%	51%	39%	5%	–	–

with generic Republican

Poll source	Date(s) administered	Sample size	Margin of error	Joe Manchin (D)	Generic Republican	Undecided
National Research Inc. (R-GOPAC)	April 17–19, 2018	–	–	37%	41%	20%
SurveyMonkey/Axios	February 12 – March 5, 2018	1,591	± 3.5%	43%	52%	5%

with Evan Jenkins

Poll source	Date(s) administered	Sample size	Margin of error	Joe Manchin (D)	Evan Jenkins (R)	Undecided
Zogby Analytics	September 27–30, 2017	320	± 5.5%	49%	36%	15%
Research America Inc.	August 11–20, 2017	400	± 4.9%	50%	40%	10%
Harper Polling	November 16–17, 2016	500	± 4.4%	51%	39%	10%

with Alex Mooney

Poll source	Date(s) administered	Sample size	Margin of error	Joe Manchin (D)	Alex Mooney (R)	Undecided
Zogby Analytics	September 27–30, 2017	320	± 5.5%	49%	35%	17%
Harper Polling	November 16–17, 2016	500	± 4.4%	58%	28%	14%

with David McKinley

Poll source	Date(s) administered	Sample size	Margin of error	Joe Manchin (D)	David McKinley (R)	Undecided
Harper Polling	November 16–17, 2016	500	± 4.4%	54%	34%	12%
Public Policy Polling	April 29 – May 1, 2016	1,201	± 2.8%	46%	36%	18%

Poll source	Date(s) administered	Sample size	Margin of error	Carte Goodwin (D)	David McKinley (R)	Undecided
Harper Polling	November 16–17, 2016	500	± 4.4%	36%	42%	22%

with generic Democratic and Republican

Poll source	Date(s) administered	Sample size	Margin of error	Generic Democrat	Generic Republican	Other	Undecided
National Research Inc. (R-GOPAC)	April 17–19, 2018	–	–	37%	49%	4%	11%
Zogby Analytics	September 27–30, 2017	320	± 5.5%	35%	40%	6%	19%

with Carte Goodwin

Poll source	Date(s) administered	Sample size	Margin of error	Carte Goodwin (D)	Alex Mooney (R)	Undecided
Harper Polling	November 16–17, 2016	500	± 4.4%	41%	31%	28%

Poll source	Date(s) administered	Sample size	Margin of error	Carte Goodwin (D)	Evan Jenkins (R)	Undecided
Harper Polling	November 16–17, 2016	500	± 4.4%	31%	43%	25%

Poll source	Date(s) administered	Sample size	Margin of error	Carte Goodwin (D)	Patrick Morrisey (R)	Undecided
Harper Polling	November 16–17, 2016	500	± 4.4%	39%	43%	18%

=== Results ===

United States Senate election in West Virginia, 2018
Party	Candidate	Votes	%	±%
Democratic	Joe Manchin (incumbent)	290,510	49.57%	−12.00%
Republican	Patrick Morrisey	271,113	46.26%	+9.79%
Libertarian	Rusty Hollen	24,411	4.17%	N/A
Total votes		586,034	100.00%	N/A
Democratic hold				

==== By county ====
All results are from the office of the Secretary of State of West Virginia.

County	Joe Manchin Democratic		Patrick Morrisey Republican		Rusty Hollen Libertarian		Margin		Total votes cast
County	%	#	%	#	%	#	%	#	Total votes cast
Barbour	42.98%	2,121	51.91%	2,562	5.11%	252	-8.93%	-441	4,935
Berkeley	42.63%	14,508	53.21%	18,111	4.16%	1,416	-10.48%	-3,603	34,035
Boone	57.12%	3,894	39.75%	2,710	3.12%	213	17.37%	1,184	6,817
Braxton	51.24%	2,148	45.01%	1,887	3.75%	157	6.23%	261	4,192
Brooke	50.93%	3,987	44.88%	3,513	4.19%	328	6.05%	474	7,828
Cabell	58.18%	16,909	38.77%	11,267	3.05%	885	19.41%	5,642	29,061
Calhoun	45.34%	967	49.93%	1,065	4.74%	101	-4.59%	-98	2,133
Clay	46.92%	1,141	49.22%	1,197	3.87%	94	-2.30%	-56	2,432
Doddridge	33.77%	746	61.20%	1,352	5.02%	111	-27.43%	-606	2,209
Fayette	53.19%	6,502	42.22%	5,160	4.59%	561	10.97%	1,342	12,223
Gilmer	47.22%	944	46.47%	929	6.30%	126	0.85%	15	1,999
Grant	24.04%	935	72.49%	2,820	3.47%	135	-48.45%	-1,885	3,890
Greenbrier	50.78%	6,201	45.55%	5,563	3.67%	448	5.23%	638	12,212
Hampshire	33.80%	2,325	62.71%	4,313	3.49%	240	-28.91%	-1,988	6,878
Hancock	46.53%	4,707	49.06%	4,963	4.42%	447	-2.53%	-256	10,117
Hardy	41.41%	1,880	54.34%	2,467	4.25%	193	-12.93%	-587	4,540
Harrison	51.05%	11,491	42.25%	9,512	6.70%	1,508	8.80%	1,979	22,511
Jackson	47.89%	4,890	48.61%	4,964	3.50%	357	-0.72%	-74	10,211
Jefferson	51.32%	10,666	45.04%	9,360	3.64%	756	6.28%	1,306	20,782
Kanawha	61.58%	39,333	35.27%	22,527	3.16%	2,018	26.31%	16,806	63,878
Lewis	41.64%	2,326	51.54%	2,879	6.82%	381	-9.90%	-553	5,586
Lincoln	51.40%	2,899	45.27%	2,553	3.33%	188	6.13%	346	5,640
Logan	47.74%	4,574	49.13%	4,708	3.13%	300	-1.39%	-134	9,582
Marion	56.23%	10,889	37.59%	7,280	6.18%	1,197	18.64%	3,609	19,366
Marshall	50.84%	5,485	45.12%	4,868	4.04%	436	5.72%	617	10,789
Mason	51.06%	4,270	45.50%	3,805	3.44%	288	5.56%	465	8,363
McDowell	48.67%	2,222	48.15%	2,198	3.18%	145	0.52%	24	4,565
Mercer	41.19%	7,430	55.62%	10,033	3.20%	577	-14.43%	-2,603	18,040
Mineral	34.79%	3,108	61.84%	5,525	3.37%	301	-27.05%	-2,417	8,934
Mingo	42.13%	2,929	55.02%	3,825	2.85%	198	-12.89%	-896	6,952
Monongalia	58.20%	18,010	35.28%	10,918	6.52%	2,019	22.92%	7,092	30,947
Monroe	43.09%	2,125	53.61%	2,644	3.30%	163	-10.52%	-519	4,932
Morgan	34.54%	2,143	60.98%	3,783	4.48%	278	-26.44%	-1,640	6,204
Nicholas	45.75%	3,588	50.34%	3,948	3.91%	307	-4.59%	-360	7,843
Ohio	55.18%	8,731	41.64%	6,588	3.19%	504	13.54%	2,143	15,823
Pendleton	37.65%	948	58.70%	1,478	3.65%	92	-21.05%	-530	2,518
Pleasants	45.88%	1,157	50.20%	1,266	3.93%	99	-4.32%	-109	2,522
Pocahontas	44.59%	1,269	49.58%	1,411	5.83%	166	-4.99%	-142	2,846
Preston	35.56%	3,686	57.34%	5,943	7.10%	736	-21.78%	-2,257	10,365
Putnam	49.31%	10,513	47.33%	10,090	3.36%	716	1.98%	423	21,319
Raleigh	43.86%	10,581	52.31%	12,620	3.84%	926	-8.45%	-2,039	24,127
Randolph	50.27%	4,472	45.16%	4,017	4.58%	407	5.11%	455	8,896
Ritchie	33.85%	1,082	61.36%	1,961	4.79%	153	-27.51%	-879	3,196
Roane	51.30%	2,165	45.00%	1,899	3.70%	156	5.30%	266	4,220
Summers	50.62%	2,069	45.71%	1,868	3.67%	150	4.91%	201	4,087
Taylor	44.91%	2,376	49.94%	2,642	5.14%	272	-5.03%	-266	5,290
Tucker	46.90%	1,469	47.96%	1,502	5.14%	161	-1.06%	-33	3,132
Tyler	38.00%	1,065	57.19%	1,603	4.82%	135	-19.19%	-538	2,803
Upshur	41.17%	3,102	53.23%	4,010	5.60%	422	-12.06%	-908	7,534
Wayne	50.34%	6,395	46.87%	5,954	2.79%	355	3.47%	441	12,704
Webster	45.03%	1,033	48.82%	1,120	6.15%	141	-3.79%	-87	2,294
Wetzel	50.91%	2,518	43.17%	2,135	5.92%	293	7.74%	383	4,946
Wirt	42.22%	790	53.71%	1,005	4.06%	76	-11.49%	-215	1,871
Wood	48.88%	14,189	47.19%	13,696	3.93%	1,141	1.69%	493	29,026
Wyoming	44.27%	2,607	52.57%	3,096	3.16%	186	-8.30%	-489	5,889

Counties that flipped from Democratic to Republican

- Barbour (largest municipality: Philippi)
- Berkeley (largest municipality: Martinsburg)
- Calhoun (largest municipality: Grantsville)
- Clay (largest municipality: Clay)
- Hampshire (largest municipality: Romney)
- Hancock (largest municipality: Weirton)
- Hardy (largest municipality: Moorefield)
- Jackson (largest municipality: Ravenswood)
- Lewis (largest municipality: Weston)
- Logan (largest municipality: Logan)
- Mercer (largest municipality: Bluefield)
- Mineral (largest municipality: Keyser)
- Mingo (largest municipality: Williamson)
- Monroe (largest municipality: Peterstown)
- Morgan (largest municipality: Berkeley Springs)
- Nicholas (largest municipality: Summersville)
- Pendleton (largest municipality: Franklin)
- Pleasants (largest municipality: St. Marys)
- Pocahontas (largest municipality: Marlinton)
- Raleigh (largest municipality: Beckley)
- Ritchie (largest municipality: Harrisville)
- Taylor (largest municipality: Grafton)
- Tucker (largest municipality: Parsons)
- Tyler (largest municipality: Paden City)
- Upshur (largest municipality: Buckhannon)
- Webster (largest municipality: Webster Springs)
- Wirt (largest municipality: Elizabeth)
- Wyoming (largest municipality: Mullens)

==== By congressional district ====
Manchin won all three congressional districts, all of which elected Republicans.

District	Manchin	Morrisey	Representative
1st	49%	46%	David McKinley
2nd	50%	46%	Alex Mooney
3rd	49%	47%	Evan Jenkins (115th Congress)
3rd	49%	47%	Carol Miller (116th Congress)
