= Tomblin =

Tomblin is a surname. Notable people with the surname include:

- Arthur Tomblin (1836–1911), English cricketer
- Charles Tomblin (1891–1918), English cricketer
- David Tomblin (1930–2005), British film and television producer and director
- Earl Ray Tomblin (born 1952), American politician
- J. Bruce Tomblin (born 1944), American communication scientist
- Lisa Tomblin, make-up artist
- Ranjuo Tomblin (born 2005), British synchronised swimmer
- Ted Tomblin (born 1971), American politician
