= Susan Ellis Weismer =

American language and communication scientist

- Born: March 27, 1953 (age 73)

Academic background
- Education: Indiana University Bloomington (BA, PhD)

Academic work
- Discipline: Communications scientist; Linguist
- Sub-discipline: Language development; Language disorders
- Institutions: University of Wisconsin–Madison

Susan Ellis Weismer (born March 27, 1953) is a language and communication scientist known for her work on language development in children with specific language impairment (SLI, also known as developmental language disorder) and autism spectrum disorder (ASD). She is the Oros Family Chair and Professor of Communication Sciences and Disorders at the University of Wisconsin–Madison, where she is a Principal Investigator and Director of the Language Processes Lab. She has also served as the Associate Dean for Research, College of Letters and Sciences at the University of Wisconsin–Madison.

Ellis Weismer received the Alfred K. Kawana Award for Lifetime Achievement in Publications from the American Speech-Language-Hearing Association (ASHA) in 2017. Previously, in 2013, she received ASHA Honors of the Association, which is their highest honor for contributions to the discipline of communication sciences and disorders. Ellis Weismer has served as Language Editor of the Journal of Speech, Language and Hearing Research.

== Biography ==
Ellis Weismer received a Bachelor of Arts degree in Speech and Hearing Science and a Doctor of Philosophy in Language Development and Disorders from Indiana University Bloomington, and also completed requirements for her CCC-SLP (Certificate of Clinical Competence, Speech-Language Pathologist). As a graduate student, Ellis Weismer studied under the mentorship of Judith Johnston, who provided guidance for her dissertation, Constructive comprehension abilities exhibited by language-disordered children. Her dissertation examined children's ability to draw interferences based on information contained in short stories presented verbally or through pictures. Children (second graders) with language disorders were less likely to make appropriate spatial and causal inferences based on story content, even when they remembered the relevant information from the story, when compared to peers of the same age who were matched in terms of nonverbal abilities. The children with language disorders performed similarly to younger children (kindergarteners) matched on language comprehension. Ellis Weismer's research article based on the dissertation won the Language Editor's Award from the Journal of Speech and Hearing Research in 1986.

Ellis Weismer's research program has been funded through grants from the National Institutes of Health (NIH), the National Institute on Deafness and Communication Disorders (NIDCD) and the National Institute of Child Health and Human Development.

== Research ==
Ellis Weismer is known for longitudinal studies of language development and for designing interventions to support communicative development in different clinical populations. One of her goals has been to assist in early identification of toddlers at risk for language disorders. She and her students conducted a five-year study of lexical (vocabulary) and grammatical development in late talking toddlers with the aim of determining whether the evaluation methods used to assess language processing in late talkers were reliable indicators of future language delays. They found close links between vocabulary and syntactic knowledge in both late talkers and toddlers with typical language development, but also found less reliance on syntactic bootstrapping in support of vocabulary development among late talkers. The researchers provided public access to their language corpus through the CHILDES database.

Ellis Weismer and her colleagues have examined overlapping language profiles of different populations of children with language delay, which has led to improvements in early differential diagnosis of language disorders. One of her studies focused on distinguishing the lexical and grammatical abilities of children with ASD as compared to children identified as late talkers who are not on the autism spectrum. This study revealed that toddlers with autism had more severe receptive than expressive language delays in comparison to a group described as developmentally delayed. Other work, with Hugh Catts and colleagues, examined overlapping language profiles of children identified with dyslexia and those identified with SLI; their research identified a high rate of comorbidity between these developmental disorders. In another study, they compared the language development trajectories of 8th graders identified as having impairments in either reading comprehension or decoding skills, which include the ability to recognize the basic sounds that make up words and map sounds onto letters. At kindergarten, 2nd, and 4th grade, the children with poor reading comprehension had shown deficits in linguistic comprehension whereas the children with poor decoding skills had shown deficits in phonological processing. The distinct patterns of impaired skills in the two groups provided support for the simple view of reading, which proposes that reading is dependent on separable skills of decoding and linguistic comprehension.

Ellis Weismer also collaborated with J. Bruce Tomblin and others on studies of verbal working memory in children with SLI, and the impact of working memory deficits on language abilities. One of their studies used fMRI to explore brain-behavior relationships in adolescents with SLI and documented atypical attentional and memory processes while the youth performed verbal tasks.

== Representative publications ==
- Catts, H. W., Adlof, S. M., Hogan, T. P., & Ellis Weismer, S. (2005). Are specific language impairment and dyslexia distinct disorders? Journal of Speech, Language, and Hearing Research, 48(6), pages 1378–1396.
- Catts, H. W., Adlof, S. M., & Ellis Weismer, S. (2006). Language deficits in poor comprehenders: A case for the simple view of reading. Journal of Speech, Language, and Hearing Research, 49(2), pages 278–293.
- Ellis Weismer, S., Evans, J., & Hesketh, L. J. (1999). An examination of verbal working memory capacity in children with specific language impairment. Journal of Speech, Language, and Hearing Research, 42(5), pages 1249–1260.
- Ellis Weismer, S., & Hesketh, L. J. (1996). Lexical learning by children with specific language impairment: Effects of linguistic input presented at varying speaking rates. Journal of Speech, Language, and Hearing Research, 39(1), pages 177–190.
- Ellis Weismer, S., Tomblin, J. B., Zhang, X., Buckwalter, P., Chynoweth, J. G., & Jones, M. (2000). Nonword repetition performance in school-age children with and without language impairment. Journal of Speech, Language, and Hearing Research, 43(4), pages 865–878.
