= Paul Hardesty =

American lobbyist and politician

Member of the West Virginia Senate from the 7th district
- In office January 18, 2019 – December 3, 2020
- Appointed by: Jim Justice
- Preceded by: Richard Ojeda
- Succeeded by: Rupie Phillips

Personal details
- Born: February 4, 1963 (age 63) Man, West Virginia, U.S.
- Party: Democratic
- Spouse: Debby Kulchuk
- Children: 1

Paul Hardesty (born February 4, 1963) is an American lobbyist and politician who served as a member of the West Virginia Senate from 2019 to 2020. A Democrat, he served the 7th district, which contains Boone, Lincoln, and Logan counties, as well as parts of Mingo and Wayne counties.

Hardesty previously served as president of the Logan County Board of Education from July 2016 to January 2019, and as a legislative aide to Gov. Bob Wise and Gov. Joe Manchin from 2001 to 2007. Hardesty was also a registered coal lobbyist, whose clients included several companies affiliated with current Gov. Jim Justice.

== Early life ==
Hardesty was born in Man, West Virginia, on February 4, 1963, to Larry D. and Donna B. Hardesty. He attended Richlands High School.

Hardesty is a Baptist.

== West Virginia Senate (2019–2021) ==
=== Appointment ===
After Richard Ojeda resigned from the West Virginia Senate in 2019 in order to focus on his 2020 presidential campaign, the Democratic committee in the 7th district nominated three candidates to replace him: Hardesty, former state delegate Harry Keith White, and former state senator Art Kirkendoll (whom Ojeda defeated in the 2016 primary). On January 17, 2019, Governor Jim Justice chose Hardesty to fill the vacancy, and Hardesty assumed office the following day.

The appointment caused some controversy, as Hardesty had been a registered coal lobbyist whose clients included several companies affiliated with Justice. While Hardesty closed the lobbying arm of his business upon his appointment, Ojeda nevertheless saw the appointment as "the governor selecting his own personal puppet", and even attempted to rescind his resignation, though he was unsuccessful in doing so.

=== Committee assignments ===
- Committee on the Agriculture and Rural Development (2019–2020)
- Committee of the Whole (2019–2020)
- Committee on Interstate Cooperation (2019–2020)
- Committee on the Judiciary (2019–2020)
- Committee on the Military (2019–2020)
- Committee on Natural Resources (2019–2020)

=== Tenure ===
In February 2019, Hardesty voted in favor of a bill to increase the minimum age to purchase tobacco products to 21 and to make it a crime to smoke in a vehicle with a child as a passenger. Hardesty said his vote was influenced by his personal experiences of driving with his parents from Logan to Barboursville on Sundays, with his parents chain-smoking all along the way. Hardesty said he vomited in an identical spot on every ride because of the lack of fresh air and the winding road.

In March 2019, Hardesty voted against HB 2519, a bill to allow, with certain exceptions, people with concealed carry permits to carry weapons on college campuses in West Virginia. All of West Virginia's colleges and universities had been against the passage of the bill.

In 2023, Hardesty endorsed Republican, Moore Capito for Governor. Hardesty donated $5,600 to Capito’s campaign, according to reports filed with the West Virginia Secretary of State.

West Virginia Senate
| Preceded by Richard Ojeda | Member of the West Virginia Senate from the 7th district January 18, 2019 – December 3, 2020 | Succeeded by Rupie Phillips |
