= Nippold =

Nippold is a surname. Notable people with the surname include:

- Friedrich Wilhelm Franz Nippold (1838–1918), German Protestant theologian
- Marilyn Nippold (born 1951), American scientist
- Otfried Nippold (1864–1938), German–Swiss jurist, pacifist, and internationalist
