= Brad White =

Brad White may refer to:

- Brad White (cricketer) (born 1970), South African cricket umpire and cricketer
- Brad White (defensive lineman) (1958–2022), American football player
- Brad White (American football coach) (born 1982), American football coach
- Brad White (politician), American state legislator

== See also ==
- Bradley White (born 1982), American cyclist
