= Susan Ellis =

Susan Ellis may refer to:

- Susan J. Ellis, American trainer, researcher and consultant regarding volunteerism
- Susan Ellis (geophysicist), geophysicist based in New Zealand
- Susan Wild, née Ellis, member of the U.S. House of Representatives

== See also ==
- Susan Williams-Ellis, British pottery designer
- Susan Ellis Weismer, language and communication scientist
