= J. Bruce Tomblin =

American language and communication scientist

- Born: February 10, 1944 (age 82)
- Awards: ASHA Honors (2010); Callier Prize (2011)

Academic background
- Education: La Verne College (BA); University of Redlands (MA); University of Wisconsin–Madison (PhD)

Academic work
- Discipline: Communication scientist
- Sub-discipline: Developmental language disorders
- Institutions: University of Iowa

James Bruce Tomblin (born February 10, 1944) is a language and communication scientist and an expert on the epidemiology and genetics of developmental language disorders (DLD). He holds the position of Professor Emeritus of Communication Sciences and Disorders at the University of Iowa.

Tomblin received the Alfred K. Kawana Award for Lifetime Achievement in Publications from the American Speech-Language-Hearing Association (ASHA) in 2009 and ASHA Honors in 2010. He received the Callier Prize in Communication Disorders in 2011 for "remarkable advances in the epidemiology, etiology, assessment and treatment of children's language disorders."

Tomblin has co-edited several books including Understanding Individual Differences in Language Development Across the School Years (with Marilyn Nippold), and Understanding Developmental Language Disorders: From Theory to Practice (with Courtenay Norbury and Dorothy V. M. Bishop).

== Biography ==
Tomblin went to La Verne College from 1963–1966, where he earned his Bachelor of Arts degree in Psychology. He attended graduate school at the University of Redlands from 1966–1967, where he received his Master of Arts in Speech Pathology and was awarded his membership in American Speech and Hearing Association Certificate of Clinical Competence in Speech-Language Pathology (CCC-SLP). Tomblin completed his PhD in Communication Disorders at the University of Wisconsin–Madison in 1970. He held faculty positions at Syracuse University and SUNY Upstate Medical Center prior to joining the faculty of the University of Iowa in 1972.

Tomblin was named Spriestersbach Distinguished Professor of Liberal Arts & Sciences at the University of Iowa in 1999 and was named Honorary Fellow of the Murdoch Children's Research Institute in 2013. His research has been supported by grants from the National Institutes of Health and the National Institute on Deafness and Other Communication Disorders.

== Research ==
Tomblin and his colleagues developed a system for valid and reliable diagnosis of Specific Language Impairment (SLI, also known as DLD). Their validation study used measures of comprehension and production of vocabulary, grammar, and narrative to assess the language abilities of over 1500 kindergarten children, and received the Editor's Award from the Journal of Speech and Hearing Research in 2009. Tomblin's research team subsequently conducted a large scale epidemiological study which aimed to determine the prevalence of SLI in kindergarten children. This study screened over 7,000 children in the Midwestern region of the United States for SLI and established an overall prevalence rate of 7%, with estimates of 8% for boys and 6% for girls. Data from this study were made available to the public through the EpiSLI database.

Other research in Tomblin's lab has focused on language outcomes of deaf children who received cochlear implants. In one study, Tomblin and his colleagues examined growth in oral language, and found that children who received cochlear implants as infants had greater expressive language than children who received cochlear implants as toddlers. Another study examining "Long-term trajectories of the development of speech sound production in pediatric cochlear implant recipients" received the Editor's Award from the Journal of Speech, Language, and Hearing Research in 2009. This study examined speech sound production of pre-lingually deaf children who had cochlear implants for a minimum of eight years. Tomblin's research team found that development in children's speech sound production leveled off after about eight years of experience with the device, with accuracy in speech sound production after four years predicting their long-term speech outcomes.

== Representative publications ==
- Catts, H. W.; Fey, M. E.; Zhang, X.; Tomblin, J. B. (1999). "Language basis of reading and reading disabilities: Evidence from a longitudinal investigation". Scientific Studies of Reading. 3 (4): 331–361. doi:10.1207/s1532799xssr0304_2.
- Tomblin, J. B. (1989). "Familial concentration of developmental language impairment". Journal of Speech and Hearing Disorders. 54 (2): 287–295. doi:10.1044/jshd.5402.287. PMID 2468827.
- Tomblin, J. B.; Barker, B. A.; Spencer, L. J.; Zhang, X.; Gantz, B. J. (2005). "The effect of age at cochlear implant initial stimulation on expressive language growth in infants and toddlers". Journal of Speech, Language, and Hearing Research. 48 (4): 854–867. doi:10.1044/1092-4388(2005/059). PMC 3209960. PMID 16378478.
- Tomblin, J. B.; Records, N. L.; Buckwalter, P.; Zhang, X.; Smith, E.; O'Brien, M. (1997). "Prevalence of specific language impairment in kindergarten children". Journal of Speech, Language, and Hearing Research. 40 (6): 1245–1260. doi:10.1044/jslhr.4006.1245. PMC 5075245. PMID 9430746.
- Tomblin, J. B.; Records, N. L.; Zhang, X. (1996). "A system for the diagnosis of specific language impairment in kindergarten children". Journal of Speech, Language, and Hearing Research. 39 (6): 1284–1294. doi:10.1044/jshr.3906.1284. PMID 8959613.
