= Judith A. Cooper =

American speech pathologist (born 1949)

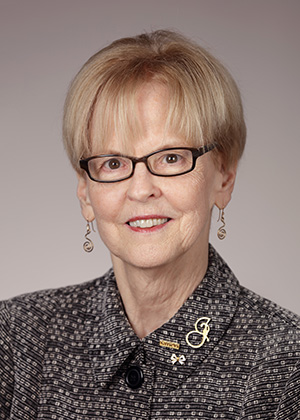
- Cooper in 2018

Director of the National Institute on Deafness and Other Communication Disorders
- Acting
- In office June 2018 – August 2019
- Preceded by: James F. Battey
- Succeeded by: Debara L. Tucci

Personal details
- Born: September 16, 1949 (age 77) Baton Rouge, Louisiana, U.S.
- Education: Southern Methodist University; Vanderbilt University; University of Washington
- Occupation: Speech pathologist

Judith Ann Cooper (born September 16, 1949) is an American speech pathologist serving as the deputy director of the National Institute on Deafness and Other Communication Disorders (NIDCD). She was the acting director of the NIDCD from June 2018 to August 2019. Cooper is an elected fellow of the American Speech–Language–Hearing Association.

== Education ==
Cooper was born September 16, 1949, in Baton Rouge, Louisiana, to Joyce and Peter Cooper. A native of Shreveport, Louisiana, she graduated from C. E. Byrd High School in 1967. Cooper completed a Bachelor of Fine Arts in speech-language pathology from Southern Methodist University in 1971. She received an M.S. in speech-language pathology at Vanderbilt University in 1972, and worked as a speech-language pathologist in Nashville, Tennessee, until 1978. Cooper earned a Ph.D. in speech and hearing sciences from the University of Washington 1982. Her dissertation was titled, Residual impairments in children with a history of acquired aphasia. Copper's doctoral advisor was Charles R. Flowers.

== Career ==
Cooper joined the National Institutes of Health in 1982 as a health science administrator (HSA) within the National Institute of Neurological and Communicative Disorders and Stroke. In 1988, Cooper joined the National Institute on Deafness and Other Communication Disorders (NIDCD) as an HSA soon after the institute was established. She subsequently served as deputy director as well as acting director of the Division of Human Communication; she was then named chief of the Scientific Programs Branch. In 2003, she became director, Division of Scientific Programs. Since 2004, she has also served as deputy director of the NIDCD. Throughout her time at the NIDCD, she has overseen the extramural research portfolio in the areas of language, language impairments, and language in deaf individuals.

Cooper is deputy director of the NIDCD and director of the NIDCD Division of Scientific Programs. Upon James F. Battey, Jr.'s retirement, served as NIDCD acting director from June 2018 until August 2019. Copper was succeeded by Debara L. Tucci.

== Awards and honors ==
Cooper received the Distinguished Alumnus award from Vanderbilt University, a Secretary's (Department of Health and Human Services) Award for Distinguished Service, and several NIH Director's awards. She was elected a fellow of the American Speech–Language–Hearing Association (ASHA) in 2006 and received ASHA's Honors of the Association award, its highest honor, in 2007.
