= Rupie Phillips =

American politician

Member of the West Virginia Senate from the 7th district
- Incumbent
- Assumed office December 1, 2020 Serving with Mike Stuart (2020-2025); Zack Maynard (2025-)
- Preceded by: Paul Hardesty

Member of the West Virginia House of Delegates from the 24th district
- In office January 2013 – January 2019
- Preceded by: Marty Gearheart
- Succeeded by: Ralph Rodighiero, Tim Tomblin

Member of the West Virginia House of Delegates from the 19th district
- In office January 2011 – January 2013
- Preceded by: Jeff Eldridge

Personal details
- Born: February 17, 1969 (age 57)
- Party: Republican
- Other political affiliations: Democratic (before 2017); Independent (2017)

Rupert W. "Rupie" Phillips, Jr. (born February 17, 1969) is an American politician and a Republican member of the West Virginia Senate since 2020. Prior to his election to the Senate, he served in the West Virginia House of Delegates representing the 19th and 24th Districts from 2011 to 2019.

== Politics ==
First elected as a Democrat to the House of Delegates in 2010, Phillips switched his party registration from Democrat to Independent after the 2016 elections. After a few months as an independent in 2017, Phillips became a Republican and announced a run for the Third Congressional District seat, being vacated by then-Representative Evan Jenkins in 2018. Phillips finished second in the primary to future Congresswoman and then-fellow Delegate Carol Miller.

After his unsuccessful Congressional run, Phillips ran as the Republican nominee for the West Virginia Senate 7th District in 2020, where he beat then-Democratic Delegate Ralph Rodighiero in the general election.

== Personal ==
Phillips graduated from Man High School. At one point, the license plate on his personal vehicle spelled "COALDEL," for coal delegate, and his twitter biography read, “I eat coal for breakfast.” reflecting his support of the coal industry.

He was arrested and charged with domestic battery in 2012. In January 2016, Phillips garnered national headlines for handing out bottles of sunscreen to other Delegates on the House floor to ridicule global warming.

Phillips was subject to national ridicule when he was unaware that power plants that operate using coal and natural gas are forced to go offline when temperatures approach 0F since the water cooling inlets freeze at such temperatures preventing operation.

== Elections ==
Senate:

West Virginia's 7th Senate district General Election, 2020
Party	Candidate	Votes	%
Republican	Rupie Phillips	20,484	56.2%
Democratic	Ralph Rodighiero	15,965	43.8%
Total votes		36,449	100.0%

U.S. House:

2018 West Virginia's Third Congressional District, Republican primary results
Party	Candidate	Votes	%
Republican	Carol Miller	8,936	23.8
Republican	Rupert Phillips	7,320	19.5
Republican	Marty Gearheart	6,833	18.2
Republican	Conrad Lucas	6,812	18.1
Republican	Rick Snuffer	4,032	10.7
Republican	Ayne Amjad	2,791	7.4
Republican	Philip Payton	861	2.3
Total votes		37,585	100.0

House of Delegates:

2012: After being redistricted to District 24 alongside former delegate Lidella Hrutkay, Phillips ran in the seven-way Democratic Primary and placed first with 2,917 votes (26.2%) ahead of Ted Tomblin, who placed second, and former Representative Hrutkay, who took third. Phillips and Tomblin were unopposed for the November general election where Phillips placed second with 6,861 votes (47.4%).

2010: Phillips ran in the eleven-way Democratic Primary and placed third with 3,205 votes (13.0%) ahead of former delegate Ted Ellis. The frontrunners won the six-way four-position November general election where Phillips placed fourth with 8,672 votes (18.1%) behind incumbent Representatives Ralph Rodighiero, Greg Butcher, and Josh Stowers and ahead of Republican nominees Chad Story and Elias Gregory, who had run for the seat in 2006.

2008: Phillips ran in the twelve-way Democratic Primary, but did not place in the top four in the multimember district. The frontrunners were unopposed for the four-position General election.

== See also ==
- List of American politicians who switched parties in office
