= Senator Dempsey =

Senator Dempsey may refer to:

- Chester Dempsey (1896–1969), Wisconsin State Senate
- Tracy Dempsey (born 1950), West Virginia State Senate
