= Suzette Raines =

American politician

Member of the West Virginia House of Delegates from the 35th district
- In office January 12, 2013 – December 1, 2014
- Preceded by: Pete Sigler
- Succeeded by: Chris Stansbury

Personal details
- Party: Republican
- Website: suzetteraines.com

Suzette Marie Raines is an American politician and a former Republican member of the West Virginia House of Delegates having represented District 35 from January 12, 2013 until December 1, 2014. Raines won the primary for the 2014 House of Delegates election, however she would later drop out from the race due to allegations from the Democratic Party as well as other personal reasons, and as a result her name was replaced on the ballot. She later served for three months as West Virginia Attorney General Patrick Morrisey's top legislative aide before quiting in April 2015.

== Elections ==
2012 With the redistricting of District 35, Raines ran in the ten-way May 8, 2012 Republican Primary and placed second with 2,561 votes (18.2%), and placed second in the eight-way four-position November 6, 2012 General election with 13,676 votes (14.5%), behind incumbent Democratic Representative Doug Skaff, ahead of fellow Republican selectees Eric Nelson and John McCuskey, and non-selectees incumbent Democratic Representatives Bobbie Hatfield and Bonnie Brown, Democratic nominee Chris Morris, and fellow Republican nominee Fred Joseph.
