= Laurence B. Leonard =

American language scientist

- Citizenship: American
- Occupations: Rachel E. Stark Distinguished Professor, Purdue University
- Awards: Callier Prize, University of Texas at Dallas, 2015 Fellow, American Association for the Advancement of Science, 2015 Honorary Doctorate, Faculty of Medicine, Lund University, Sweden, 2021

Academic background
- Education: B.A., Psychology, University of South Florida M.S., Speech Pathology, University of South Florida
- Alma mater: University of Pittsburgh

Academic work
- Discipline: Speech Pathology, Psycholinguistics
- Sub-discipline: Language development, Language Disorders in Children; Cross-Linguistic Research; Language Development; Language Intervention
- Institutions: Purdue University

Laurence Baker Leonard is an American speech pathologist and linguist, recognized for his foundational research on understanding the linguistic challenges of children with Specific Language Impairment (now referred to as Developmental Language Disorder). Leonard holds the Rachel E. Stark Distinguished Professorship at Purdue University, where he directs cross-linguistic research on child language disorders.

Leonard has received numerous awards in recognition of his significant contributions to the field of speech-language pathology. He was named a Fellow of the American Speech-Language-Hearing Association (ASHA) and subsequently received the Alfred K. Kawana Council of Editors Award for Lifetime Achievement in Publications in 1995 and ASHA Honors of the Association in 2001. These are the highest awards given by the association, acknowledging Leonard's extensive and influential work on Specific Language Impairment. In 2010, Leonard received the Distinguished Alumni Award from the University of Pittsburgh School of Health and Rehabilitation Sciences. In 2015, he received Callier Prize in Communication Disorders for his "leadership in fostering scientific advances and significant developments in the diagnosis and treatment of communication disorders."

== Biography ==
Leonard received his B.A. in Psychology from the University of South Florida in 1969 and his M.S. in Speech Pathology from the same institution in 1970. He went on to complete his Ph.D. in Speech Pathology/Psycholinguistics in 1973 at the University of Pittsburgh. His dissertation, mentored by Audrey Holland, was titled Teaching grammar to linguistically deviant children: The acquisition of and relationships among certain syntactic structures. After completing his degree, Leonard embarked on his academic career as an Assistant Professor of Speech Pathology at Memphis State University, before moving to Purdue University as an Associate Professor in 1978. He was named a Distinguished Professor of Speech-Language Pathology at Purdue in 1991.

Leonard's research career has been supported by National Institutes of Health (NIH) grants from the National Institute of Neurological and Communication Disorders and Stroke and the National Institute on Deafness and Other Communication Disorders.

From 1985-1990, Leonard served as Editor in Chief of the Journal of Speech and Hearing Disorders (now known as the Journal of Speech, Language, and Hearing Research).

== Research ==
Leonard has authored over 200 scientific papers, articles, and book chapters, His research has employed methodologies ranging from experimental designs to longitudinal studies of language development in English, Hebrew, Italian, and other languages. His extensive research on Specific Language Impairment has focused on grammatical morphology, verb acquisition, and cross-linguistic comparisons.

Among his many publications, three research articles were selected for ASHA Editor’s Awards, given to the most meritorious single article appearing in the journal in the previous year. In 1986, his paper "Unusual and subtle phonological behavior in the speech of phonologically disordered children" received the Editor's Award from the Journal of Speech and Hearing Disorders. In 1989, Leonard and Diane Frome Loeb received the Editor's Award from the Journal of Speech and Hearing Research for their paper "Government-binding theory and some of its applications: A tutorial". In 1998, Leonard and his collaborators Julia Eyer, Lisa Bedore, and Bernard Grela received the Editor's Award from the Journal of Speech, Language, and Hearing Research for their co-authored paper "Three accounts of the grammatical morpheme difficulties of English-speaking children with Specific Language Impairment."

== Selected publications ==
- Bedore, Lisa M.; Leonard, Laurence B. (2001). "Grammatical Morphology Deficits in Spanish-Speaking Children with Specific Language Impairment". Journal of Speech, Language, and Hearing Research. 44 (4): 905–924. doi:10.1044/1092-4388(2001/072). PMID 11521782.
- Leonard, Laurence B. (2014). "Specific Language Impairment Across Languages". Child Development Perspectives. 8 (1): 1–5. doi:10.1111/cdep.12053. PMC 3994122. PMID 24765105.
- Leonard, Laurence B.; Camarata, Stephen M.; Brown, Barbara; Camarata, Mary N. (2004). "Tense and Agreement in the Speech of Children with Specific Language Impairment". Journal of Speech, Language, and Hearing Research. 47 (6): 1363–1379. doi:10.1044/1092-4388(2004/102). PMID 15842016.
- Deevy, Patricia; Leonard, Laurence B. (2004). "The Comprehension of Wh -Questions in Children with Specific Language Impairment". Journal of Speech, Language, and Hearing Research. 47 (4): 802–815. doi:10.1044/1092-4388(2004/060). PMID 15324287.

== Books ==
- Leonard, L. B. (2000). Children with Specific Language Impairment. MIT Press.
- Leonard, L. B. (2014). Children with Specific Language Impairment (2nd ed.). MIT Press. ISBN 9780262535403
