= Senator Dalton =

Senator Dalton may refer to:

- Daniel Dalton (American politician) (born 1949), New Jersey State Senate
- Edwina P. Dalton (born 1936), Virginia State Senate
- John N. Dalton (1931–1986), Virginia State Senate
- Sammy D. Dalton (born 1951), West Virginia State Senate
- Theodore Roosevelt Dalton (1901–1989), Virginia State Senate
- Tristram Dalton (1738–1817), U.S. Senator from Massachusetts from 1789 to 1791
- Walter Dalton (born 1949), North Carolina State Senate
