= Timothy Kinsey =

American politician (born 1949)

Member of the West Virginia House of Delegates
- In office June 18, 2013 – 2014
- Constituency: District 19

Personal details
- Born: November 12, 1949 (age 76)
- Party: Democratic
- Education: Marshall University; University of Wisconsin

Timothy Kinsey (born November 12, 1949) is an American politician from West Virginia. He is a Democrat and represented District 19 in the West Virginia House of Delegates from 2013 to 2014. He was appointed to the seat by Governor Earl Ray Tomblin to replace Speaker Rick Thompson.
