= Richard Ojeda =

American politician and military officer (born 1970)

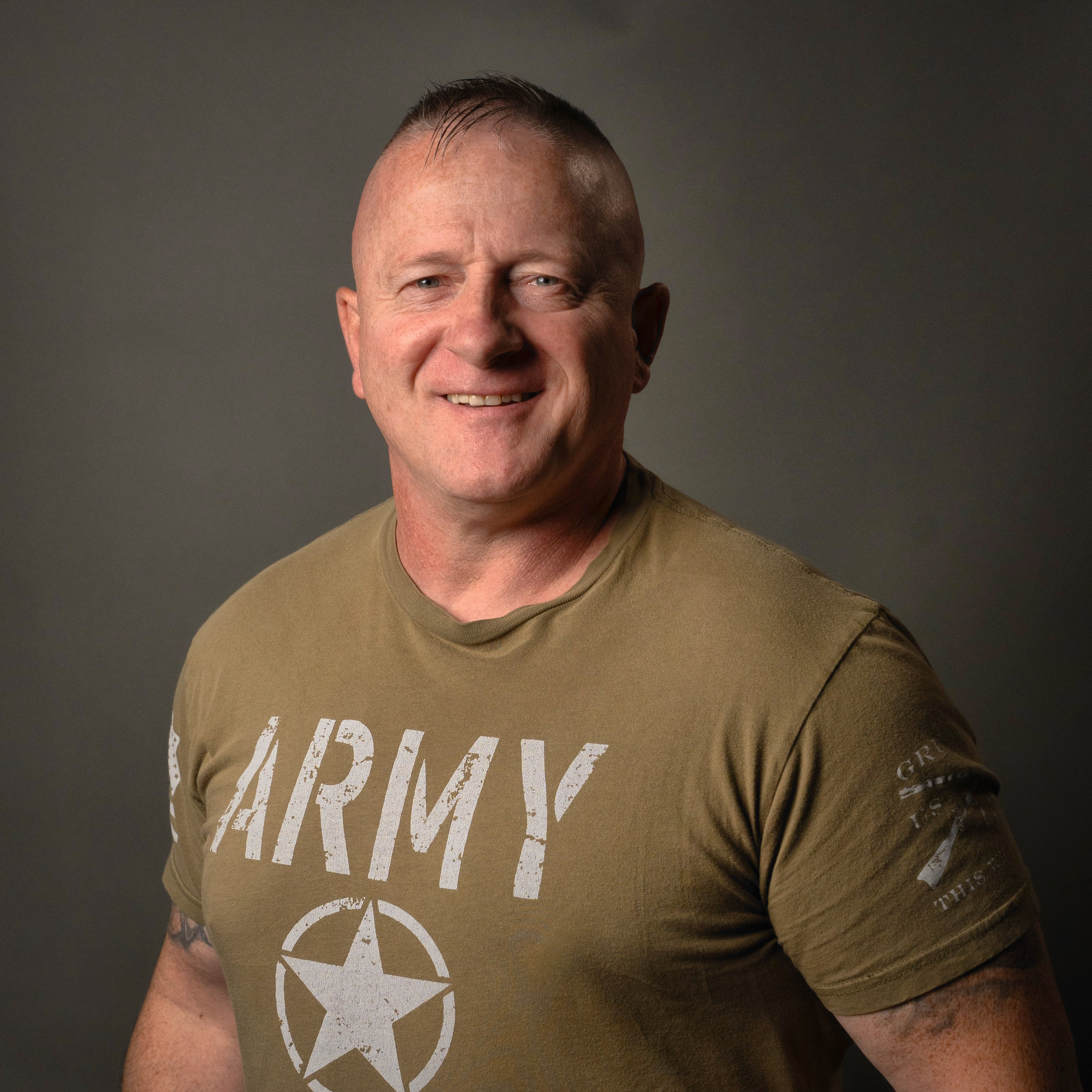
- Ojeda in 2026

Member-elect of the U.S. House of Representatives from North Carolina's 9th district
- Assuming office January 3, 2027
- Succeeding: Richard Hudson

Member of the West Virginia Senate from the 7th district
- In office December 1, 2016 – January 14, 2019
- Preceded by: Art Kirkendoll
- Succeeded by: Paul Hardesty

Personal details
- Born: Richard Neece Ojeda II; October 25, 1970 (age 56) Rochester, Minnesota, U.S.
- Party: Democratic
- Spouse: Kelly Ojeda
- Children: 3
- Education: West Virginia State University (BA); Webster University (MBA)
- Website: Campaign website

Military service
- Branch/service: United States Army
- Years of service: 1989–2014
- Rank: Major
- Unit: 10th Mountain Division; 20th Engineer Brigade
- Battles/wars: War in Afghanistan; Iraq War
- Awards: Bronze Star Medal (2) Full list: Meritorious Service Medal (2); Army Commendation Medal (7); Army Achievement Medal (5); Good Conduct Medal; National Defense Service Medal; Afghanistan Campaign Medal; Iraq Campaign Medal; GWOT Expeditionary Medal; GWOT Service Medal; Korea Defense Service Medal; Armed Forces Service Medal; Humanitarian Service Medal; Outstanding Volunteer Service Medal; Army Non-Commissioned Officer Professional Development Ribbon Ribbon; Army Service Ribbon; Overseas Service Ribbon (4); NATO Medal; Valorous Unit Award; Meritorious Unit Commendation (4); Superior Unit Award; Combat Action Badge; Master Parachutist Badge; Air Assault Badge; Bronze De Fleury Medal; Sapper Tab; Canadian, Venezuelan, German, Chilean, Kuwaiti, Egyptian and Pakistani parachutist badges; German Schützenschnur (bronze)

Richard Neece Ojeda II (/oʊˈdʒɛdə/ oh-JED-ə; born October 25, 1970) is an American politician and retired United States Army major who is the member-elect for North Carolina's 9th congressional district. A member of the Democratic Party, he previously served in the West Virginia Senate, representing the 7th district from December 2016 until January 2019.

Raised in Logan, West Virginia, Ojeda graduated from West Virginia State University and Webster University. He initially joined the United States Army as an enlisted soldier and went through officer training after finishing college. During his 25 years in the military, Ojeda earned two Bronze Star Medals and rose to the rank of major. He served two tours of duty in Iraq and spent over fifteen years during his service at Fort Bragg near Fayetteville, North Carolina. After retiring, he initially worked as a Junior Reserve Officers' Training Corps teacher before running for office.

In 2016, Ojeda was elected to the West Virginia Senate. In 2018, he was the Democratic nominee for West Virginia's 3rd congressional district, garnering attention as a vocal supporter of the 2018 teachers' strike and the legalization of cannabis in West Virginia. He lost the November election to Republican Carol Miller, and later that month announced his candidacy for President of the United States in the 2020 election, resigning from the state senate for his campaign. He later suspended his candidacy after failing to gain traction and instead ran for U.S. Senate, placing second in the Democratic primary. Following his 2020 campaigns, Ojeda moved back to North Carolina, winning the Democratic nomination for North Carolina's 9th congressional district in 2026. Ojeda defeated incumbent Richard Hudson, chair of the National Republican Congressional Committee, in the general election.

== Early life and education ==
Richard Neece Ojeda II was born on September 25, 1970, in Rochester, Minnesota, to Florena and Richard Ojeda Sr. Ojeda said he became a Democrat at age 18 because his parents were Democrats. He recalled that "back when I was in high school, being a Republican was like cursing". Ojeda's father was born in the United States, but moved to Mexico and lived there until the age of eight. Ojeda's father worked as a nurse anaesthetist and fought in the Korean War. Ojeda's paternal grandfather, Senon H. Ojeda, was an undocumented immigrant from Jalisco, Mexico who moved to Logan, West Virginia. Senon Ojeda rode with Pancho Villa, which led him to flee to the United States after Mexican troops were after him. His maternal grandfather was from Romania and died in a mining accident after fighting in World War II. Ojeda also has Italian ancestry.

Ojeda graduated from Logan High School in 1988. He earned a bachelor's degree in General Education from West Virginia State University and a master's degree in Business and Organizational Security from Webster University.

== Military service and teaching career ==
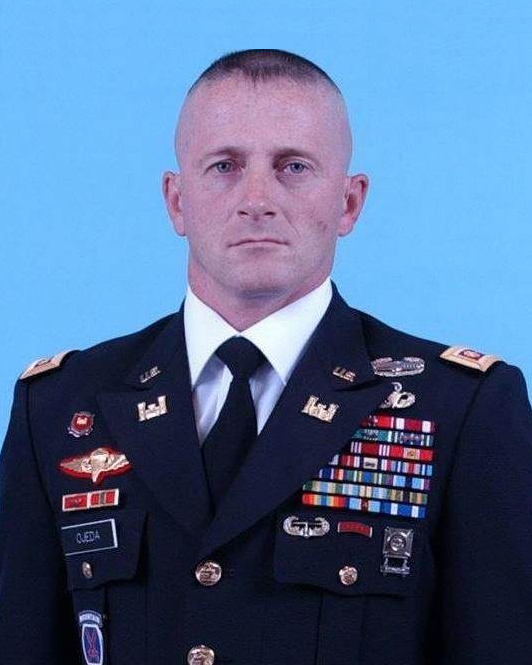
Army portrait (2013)

Ojeda said "Where I come from, when you graduate high school, there's only three choices—dig coal, sell dope, or join the Army. And I chose the military". He served 25 years in the United States Army, starting as an enlisted soldier before going through officer training and rising to the rank of major. His first orders sent him to serve in North Carolina at Fort Bragg in 1997, where he would spend the majority of his military career. In 2004, he assumed command of a company in the 20th Engineer Brigade and immediately deployed with them to Iraq as part of the Iraq War. He earned two Bronze Stars. During his service, he also spent time in South Korea, Honduras, Jordan, Haiti, Afghanistan. When not deployed abroad, Ojeda spent over 15 years based back at Fort Bragg, the post he was first ordered to upon entering the Army.

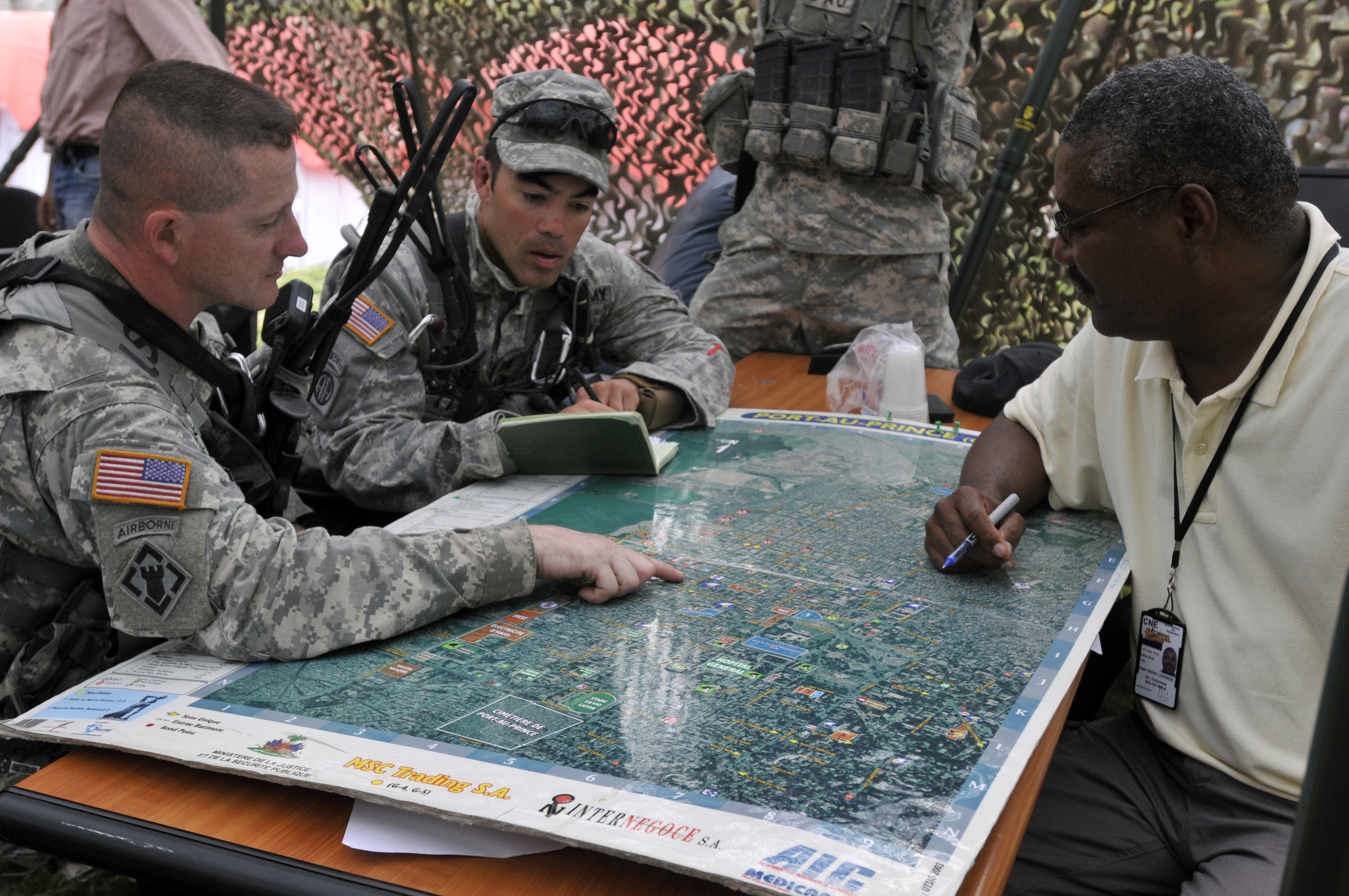
Ojeda (left) in Haiti in 2010, assisting with relief efforts after the 2010 earthquake

After retiring from the military, Ojeda worked as a Junior ROTC instructor at Chapmanville Regional High School from 2013 to 2017, resigning due to time constraints related to his service as state senator, in addition to his run for Congress. He helped start a Junior Reserve Officers' Training Corps at a local high school. He established a social services nonprofit, the Logan Empowerment Action and Development, which engaged in community cleanup, Christmas toy drives, providing meals for the needy, and raising money for shoes for kids. During this time, Ojeda also started penning letters to the editor of the Logan Banner. As a result, Ojeda was invited by Senator Joe Manchin of West Virginia to the 2013 State of the Union address as a guest. Ojeda decided to enter politics while listening to Manchin discuss disparities in allocation of "manufacturing hubs" to different regions of West Virginia.

== West Virginia State Senate ==
=== 2016 election ===
Ojeda was assaulted at a primary campaign event on May 8, 2016, in Logan County, West Virginia. The assailant, Jonathan S. Porter, who had ties to Ojeda's opponent, received 1–5 years in prison, and a $500 fine as a part of a plea deal. Ojeda went on to win the Democratic primary for the 7th District of the West Virginia Senate, defeating incumbent Art Kirkendoll. In the general election, held on November 8, 2016, he defeated Republican Jordan Bridges by almost 18 points.

=== Tenure ===
In the West Virginia Senate, Ojeda sponsored the West Virginia Medical Cannabis Act, legislation to legalize medical marijuana, which was signed into law by Governor Jim Justice on April 19, 2017. In the Senate, he called for increases in teacher wages, arguing that low pay would lead to strikes and teachers leaving the state. In January 2018, he criticized West Virginia Governor Jim Justice's proposed 1–2% increase in teacher wages, saying it was insufficient.

Ojeda has stated "I don't think I've ever voted for a Democrat for president" and supported Donald Trump in 2016. He told Politico that he voted for Trump because he initially believed Trump would do something for West Virginians. By 2018, he expressed regret for voting for Trump, saying that "he hasn't done shit" and he is "taking care of the daggone people he's supposed to be getting rid of". Ojeda said he supported Bernie Sanders in the 2016 Democratic primary.

Ojeda resigned from the West Virginia Senate on January 14, 2019, citing frustration with the legislature's slow pace and his inability to accomplish all his legislative goals.

==== Teachers' strikes ====
Ojeda rose to prominence for his early support of and leading role in the 2018 West Virginia teachers' strike. A month before the strike, Ojeda, in a speech on the Senate floor, called on his fellow legislators to heed the complaints and requests of teachers lest a strike be inevitable. He then introduced several bills, including ones addressing public employees' healthcare needs, raising their wages, and giving teachers tax deductions on purchased classroom supplies. Due to his active and vocal support of the strikes, Ojeda was said by some to have attained something of a "folk hero" status with teachers and other unionists. He was regularly met by chants of his last name and other expressions of appreciation and commendation while traveling the state to speak out in support of the strikers (and later his Congressional bid).

Ojeda traveled to California to support the 2019 Los Angeles teachers' strike, proclaiming "Don't make us go West Virginia on you" in an op-ed published in The Intercept.

== Federal Campaigns ==
=== 2014 U.S House campaign in West Virginia ===
Ojeda entered politics in 2014, running for Congress in West Virginia's 3rd District. He garnered 34% of the vote in the Democratic primary, losing to incumbent Nick Rahall, whom Ojeda challenged on the grounds that the incumbent was not doing enough to advance the interests of the district.

=== 2018 U.S. House campaign in West Virginia ===
Ojeda ran again for West Virginia's 3rd congressional district, a seat which was vacated by Republican Evan Jenkins, who filed instead to run in the primary for the U.S. Senate. His campaign was staffed in part by local residents who were working on the campaign without pay, and held private jobs while working on the campaign. According to Ojeda, the only donations he accepted were from individual donors and labor unions. He won the Democratic primary on May 9, 2018, defeating Shirley Love, Janice Hagerman, and Paul Davis.

Salon noted that Ojeda's race was a potential bellwether, noting that "Ojeda is no stranger to converting Trump supporters: He won his state Senate election by 18 points, in a district Trump carried by 59."

During the campaign, Ojeda agreed to an interview for Michael Moore's documentary, Fahrenheit 11/9. Ojeda's off the cuff unpolished pronouncements were used by opponent Carol Miller's campaign to bring under question Ojeda's patriotism while labeling him as unhinged. Ojeda took issue with Miller's criticism in a campaign ad.

As the polling began to indicate a tight race, President Trump traveled to West Virginia in October to campaign for Miller. On the stump, Trump mocked Ojeda while making a point of pronouncing Ojeda's last name while affecting an Hispanic accent.

On November 6, 2018, Ojeda was defeated in the general election by 12 points, winning 44% of the vote to Miller's 56%. For Democrats, this was a 32-point improvement in performance from the previous election, where the Democrat won only 24% to the Republican's 68%. According to FiveThirtyEight, Ojeda outperformed his district's partisan lean by 25%, the strongest showing for a non-incumbent.

=== 2020 presidential campaign ===
Ojeda for President
- Campaign: 2020 United States presidential election (Democratic Party primaries)
- Candidate: Richard Ojeda; State Senator from West Virginia (2016–2019)
- Affiliation: Democratic Party
- Status: Inactive
- Announced: November 11, 2018
- Suspended: January 25, 2019
- Headquarters: Washington, D.C.
- Receipts: US$119,477.74 (3/31/2019)
- Slogan: We Are Worthy

Website
- www.voteojeda.com

In November 2018, Ojeda filed with the Federal Election Commission, officially becoming a candidate for President of the United States. His campaign was announced on November 11, at a Louisville, Kentucky, rally which consisted mostly of union members. His campaign focuses included ending government corruption and returning the Democratic Party to a party that benefited the working class. As no incumbent state legislator has ever mounted a serious bid for the presidency, Ojeda was considered a "longshot" and "underdog" candidate.

He resigned from the West Virginia Senate on January 9, 2019, to focus on his presidential bid. A few days after, Ojeda asked the Senate Minority Leader (a Democrat) if he could rescind his resignation, with the Senate Minority Leader telling Ojeda to talk to the Senate President (a Republican) because that is the person to whom he sent the resignation letter. The Republican governor, Jim Justice, seated lobbyist Paul Hardesty in Ojeda's vacant seat. Ojeda dropped out of the race on January 26, 2019.

=== 2020 U.S. Senate campaign in West Virginia ===
On January 13, 2020, Ojeda announced his campaign for the United States Senate, hoping to challenge incumbent Shelley Moore Capito. On June 9, 2020, Ojeda was defeated in the primary election by five points, winning 33% of the vote, as opposed to Paula Jean Swearengin's 38%. Following the primary, Ojeda endorsed Swearengin for the general election.

=== 2026 N.C. 9th congressional campaign ===
Ojeda moved back to North Carolina in 2020, where he had previously lived for over fifteen years during his military career. Ojeda announced a campaign for North Carolina's 9th congressional district in the United States House of Representatives in 2025. By October 2025, Ojeda raised $1.2 million from 20,000 donors with an average contribution of $16 each, in his bid to oust National Republican Congressional Committee Chair Richard Hudson.

On March 3, 2026, he won the Democratic nomination for the district. His win was praised by the North Carolina AFL-CIO, which cited his work as a "very strong advocate for unions" in a race roundup article. After his victory, he was a keynote speaker at a Fayetteville No Kings rally.

Ojeda beat Hudson in the November 3 election. Ojeda was one of at least six North Carolinian Democratic house candidates to win a district that voted for Donald Trump by 10 or more points in 2024, in what commentators deemed a dummymander of North Carolina's 2023 gerrymander.

== U.S. House of Representatives ==
=== Tenure ===
On the 3rd of January 2027 Richard Ojeda will be sworn into the United States House of Representatives as part of the 120th congress.

== Political positions ==
=== Ideological orientation ===
Ojeda has been described by some as a populist of the "left-wing variety". He identifies as a traditional working-class Democrat and laments what he perceives as a Democratic party that is increasingly drifting away from its working-class roots and becoming a party of the elite. In the 2016 Democratic presidential primary, he says he voted for Independent Senator Bernie Sanders. He has also been described as a moderate Democrat and he stated that he voted for President Donald Trump in the 2016 presidential election (a decision he later regretted). During his 2018 campaign, he described himself as a "conservative on most cultural issues" who supports coal jobs and border security.

=== Taxes ===
Ojeda was one of the few West Virginia lawmakers who came out outspokenly in favor of raising taxes on corporations and the rich, calling for higher corporate taxes (particularly on coal and gas corporations that were the major economic players in WV) to offset spending cuts that had negatively affected public services and employees in the state.

=== Labor rights ===
Ojeda is devoutly pro-union and received $121,440 during his 2018 campaign from several unions, including the American Federation of Teachers and the Teamsters' Union. In his 2026 North Carolina campaign, Ojeda received an endorsement from the NC AFL-CIO. Ojeda opposes right-to-work laws.

=== Veterans affairs ===
Ojeda, a veteran himself, has advocated for improved services for those who have served in the military, arguing that the United States has a fundamental obligation to care for veterans following their service. He supports expanding Veterans Affairs (VA) benefits, particularly around mental health care. His 2026 North Carolina congressional campaign collected 90,000 signatures for a petition that criticized the Trump administration cuts to VA services as part of the larger Department of Government Efficiency (DOGE) cuts.

=== Gun control ===
On gun control, Ojeda has early in his political career been described as pro-gun. In 2018, he stated that increased services for the mentally ill would help ease gun violence. At the time, he noted that he supported the Second Amendment and does not believe additional restrictions are needed.

However, on August 8, 2019, following the Dayton and El Paso shootings, Ojeda shifted his position and called pro-gun rights politicians "spineless pieces of shit" who "didn't have the balls" to take on the NRA. He also called for stricter gun restrictions, citing a series of recent mass shootings that had collectively accounted for a total of 74 deaths.

=== Foreign policy ===
Ojeda, on his Twitter account has posted several tweets opposed to Saudi Arabia and the intervention it leads in support of the Yemeni government against the Iranian-backed Houthis that had taken over much of Yemen's north including its capital, Sanaa. He stated that the US should end support for Saudi Arabia and end arms deals with the nation; he also condemned the country for the alleged involvement of the Saudi government in Jamal Khashoggi's death.

Ojeda has stated he would not support a war with Iran, pointing to the failures of the War in Iraq.

=== Abortion ===
Ojeda self-identifies as pro choice. He supports abortion rights and that he would nominate only those judges who share his support for access to abortion. He said that he hates "the idea of telling a woman what to do with her body" and noted that he supported Roe v. Wade and Planned Parenthood in an interview with The Guardian in 2018. He has also voiced opposition to the Helms Amendment that limits the United States in assistance to abortion through foreign aid, saying, "a woman raped by the Taliban or Boko Haram should not be forced by the callousness of our government to bear her rapist's child".

=== Healthcare ===
During his 2026 North Carolina congressional campaign, Ojeda noted his support for expanding Medicaid and protecting the Affordable Care Act. Ojeda in 2018 stated that Congress and the president should be barred from taking out extra insurance, and should instead have to rely on the standard healthcare which would be afforded every American citizen for the course of their terms of office, to incentivize them in promoting and maintaining quality comprehensive universal healthcare coverage.

=== Environment ===
Ojeda has called for sustainable energy. Ojeda has noted that he sees a limited role for coal in steel-making for the foreseeable future but has acknowledged that coal is "not gonna come back", and expressed his desire to find a way for miners to transition into other well-paying jobs. During his 2018 congressional campaign, Ojeda praised the Trump administration's plan to roll back environmental regulations and stated it would benefit the coal industry and bring back jobs to his district.

=== Immigration ===
In a 2016 interview with The New Yorker during the presidential election that year, Ojeda said he understood the frustrations of working-class communities that made them receptive to Donald Trump's messaging on restricting benefits for undocumented immigrants. As Trump's administration began enacting immigration policy changes, Ojeda shifted leftward in response. He has since spoken out against the Trump administration's policy of separating migrant children from their parents at the border. In his 2026 congressional campaign, Ojeda has identified changing federal immigration policy as his top priority, and has been critical of Immigration and Customs Enforcement (ICE) raids. Ojeda supports Deferred Action for Childhood Arrivals and a pathway to citizenship for "Dreamers".

=== Cannabis ===
Ojeda has called for the legalization of marijuana and clemency for those incarcerated for possession. During his tenure as state senator, Ojeda spearheaded the passage of a bill legalizing medical marijuana. He advocates directing funds raised from taxes on cannabis sales to fund public works.

=== Pharmaceutical companies ===
Ojeda has taken stances against the pharmaceutical industry, focusing in particular on its role in sparking the opioid epidemic. During his 2018 campaign, Ojeda noted that he would not take money from drug companies and would "throw their lobbyists out of my office."

=== Campaign finance, political ethics, and transparency ===
As described by Ojeda, his presidential campaign focused on "lobbying and corruption in Washington", and proposed measures to address political ethics. Ojeda proposed requiring body-cams on lobbyists in order to increase government transparency and public oversight. He is a supporter of WolfPAC, and has pledged not to take corporate donations for his campaign.

Ojeda has proposed that to prevent exploitation of political office for personal financial gain, federally elected officials and Cabinet officials must donate to charity any net worth exceeding one million dollars. He proposed that, upon retirement from public office, such officials must be subject to an annual earnings limit of $120,000 (in addition to a $130,000 pension), "subject to automatic yearly cost of living adjustments." Ojeda also called for implementing "donor vouchers," allocated funds that would give individual voters small amounts of money to donate to the candidate of their choice, to enhance the financial sway of individual, poorer voters.

== Electoral history ==
West Virginia's 3rd congressional district Democratic primary, 2014
| Party | Candidate | Votes | % |
|---|---|---|---|
| Democratic | Nick Rahall (incumbent) | 37,176 | 66.4 |
| Democratic | Richard Ojeda | 18,767 | 33.6 |
| Total votes | | 55,943 | 100.0 |

West Virginia Senate District 7 (Position B) Democratic primary election, 2016
| Party | Candidate | Votes | % |
|---|---|---|---|
| Democratic | Richard Ojeda | 11,154 | 55.2 |
| Democratic | Art Kirkendoll (incumbent) | 9,065 | 44.8 |
| Total votes | | 20,219 | 100.0 |

West Virginia Senate District 7 (Position B) election, 2016
| Party | Candidate | Votes | % |
|---|---|---|---|
| Democratic | Richard Ojeda | 19,978 | 58.8% |
| Republican | Jordan Ray Bridges | 13,987 | 41.2% |
| Total votes | | 33,965 | 100.0% |

West Virginia's 3rd congressional district Democratic primary, 2018
| Party | Candidate | Votes | % |
|---|---|---|---|
| Democratic | Richard Ojeda | 29,837 | 52.0% |
| Democratic | Shirley Love | 14,251 | 24.9% |
| Democratic | Paul Davis | 9,063 | 15.8% |
| Democratic | Janice "Byrd" Hagerman | 4,176 | 7.3% |
| Total votes | | 57,327 | 100.0% |

West Virginia's 3rd congressional district, 2018
| Party | Candidate | Votes | % |
|---|---|---|---|
| Republican | Carol Miller | 98,048 | 56.41 |
| Democratic | Richard Ojeda | 75,776 | 43.59 |
| Total votes | | 173,824 | 100.0% |

United States Senate election in West Virginia Democratic primary, 2020
| Party | Candidate | Votes | % |
|---|---|---|---|
| Democratic | Paula Jean Swearengin | 68,888 | 37.98% |
| Democratic | Richard Ojeda | 59,826 | 32.98% |
| Democratic | Richie Robb | 52,683 | 29.04% |
| Total votes | | 181,397 | 100.00% |

North Carolina's 9th congressional district Democratic primary, 2026
| Party | Candidate | Votes | % |
|---|---|---|---|
| Democratic | Richard Ojeda | 18,469 | 41.8% |
| Democratic | Nigel Bristow | 11,824 | 26.7% |
| Democratic | Lent Carr | 6,968 | 15.8% |
| Democratic | Loren Bibler | 6,960 | 15.7% |
| Total votes | | 44,221 | 100.0% |

North Carolina's 9th congressional district, 2026
| Party | Candidate | Votes | % |
|---|---|---|---|
| Democratic | Richard Ojeda | 138,707 | 51.1 |
| Republican | Richard Hudson | 132,692 | 48.9 |
| Total votes | | 271,399 | 100.0 |

U.S. House of Representatives
| Preceded by Richard Hudson | Member of the U.S. House of Representatives from North Carolina's 9th congressional district Taking office 2027 | Elect |
