= Phil Isner =

American politician

Member of the West Virginia House of Delegates
- In office 2016 – December 1, 2018
- Constituency: District 43

Personal details
- Party: Democratic

Phillip S. Isner is an American politician from West Virginia. He is a Democrat and represented District 43 in the West Virginia House of Delegates from 2016 to 2018.

Isner is an attorney by profession.
