= Ron Stollings =

American politician

Member of the West Virginia Senate from the 7th district
- In office December 1, 2006 – December 1, 2022
- Preceded by: Tracy Dempsey
- Succeeded by: Michael B. Stuart

Personal details
- Born: April 24, 1955 (age 71) Madison, West Virginia, U.S.
- Party: Democratic
- Education: Wake Forest University; West Virginia University (BA, MS); Marshall University (MD)

Ronny Douglas Stollings (born April 24, 1955) is a Democratic member of the West Virginia Senate, who represented the 7th district from 2006 to 2022. The 7th District is based in Southern West Virginia, covering all of Boone, Lincoln, and Logan Counties and parts of Mingo and Wayne Counties. Stollings' success in the district is notable, considering Donald Trump won the district by a 78%-19% margin in 2016, which was Trump’s best performance in any of the state’s 17 Senate districts.

== Politics ==
During his time in the Senate, Stollings has served as Vice Chair of the Committee on Health and Human Resources during the 78th and 79th Legislatures (2006-2010); Chair of the Committee on Confirmations during the 79th Legislature (2008-2010); and Chair of the Committee on Health and Human Resources during the 80th and 81st Legislatures (2010-2014).

Stollings ran for governor in 2020, finishing third in the Democratic primary, behind Kanawha County Commissioner Ben Salango and community organizer Stephen Smith.

== Election results ==
2020 Democratic Gubernatorial Primary results
Party	Candidate	Votes	%
Democratic	Ben Salango	74,805	38.68%
Democratic	Stephen Smith	65,544	33.89%
Democratic	Ron Stollings	25,782	13.33%
Democratic	Jody Murphy	18,039	9.33%
Democratic	Douglas Hughes	9,231	4.77%
Total votes		193,401	100.00%

West Virginia Senate District 7 (Position A) election, 2018
Party	Candidate	Votes	%
Democratic	Ron Stollings (incumbent)	15,181	56.70%
Republican	Jason Stephens	11,594	43.30%
Total votes		26,775	100.0%

West Virginia Senate District 7 (Position A) election, 2014
Party	Candidate	Votes	%
Democratic	Ron Stollings (incumbent)	14,177	65.72%
Republican	Gary Johngrass	7,394	34.28%
Total votes		21,571	100.0%

West Virginia Senate District 7 (Position A) election, 2010
Party	Candidate	Votes	%
Democratic	Ron Stollings (incumbent)	18,188	100.0%
Total votes		18,188	100.0%
