= Frank Blackwell =

American academic administrator and politician (1947–2025)

Member of the West Virginia House of Delegates from the 15th district
- In office December 1, 1976 – December 1, 1982

Member of the West Virginia House of Delegates from the 25th district
- In office January 12, 2016 – December 1, 2016
- Preceded by: Linda Phillips
- Succeeded by: Tony Paynter

Personal details
- Born: June 9, 1947 Mullens, West Virginia, U.S.
- Died: January 4, 2025 (aged 77) Charleston, West Virginia, U.S.
- Party: Democratic
- Spouse: Trudy Canterbury (m. 1970)
- Children: 2
- Parents: James R. "Tuck" Blackwell (father); Kathleen Pinkerton (mother)

Frank Lee "Bucky" Blackwell (June 9, 1947 – January 4, 2025) was an American academic administrator and politician from the state of West Virginia. He served as a Democratic member of the West Virginia House of Delegates from 1976 to 1982 and again in 2016.

== Life and career ==
Blackwell was born on June 9, 1947, in Mullens, West Virginia, the son of James R. "Tuck" and Kathleen (née Pinkerton) Blackwell. He earned degrees in elementary education in 1969 and educational administration in 1971 from Marshall University. He married Trudy Canterbury on April 4, 1970, and they would have two children. He worked as a teacher, principal, and assistant superintendent for a total of 15 years, then as superintendent of Wyoming County schools from 1982 to 2016. He was honored as West Virginia superintendent of the year in 2016. Blackwell was appointed by Governor Jim Justice as Executive Director of the School Building Authority of West Virginia, serving in that position from January 24, 2017, until he submitted his resignation in March 2018. He also served as a member of the board of governors of Concord University from his appointment by Governor Joe Manchin in March 2008 through June 2016, including as its chair from 2009 to 2013.

In 1976, Blackwell was elected to represent the 15th district, comprising Boone and Wyoming counties, in the West Virginia House of Delegates. He was re-elected in 1978 and 1980. On January 12, 2016, Governor Earl Ray Tomblin appointed Blackwell to fill the vacancy left by the resignation of 25th district delegate Linda Phillips. He represented the district, comprising most of Wyoming County and parts McDowell and Mercer counties, during the 2016 legislative session, but lost election to the seat that fall.

Blackwell died at CAMC Memorial Hospital in Charleston, West Virginia, on January 4, 2025, at the age of 77. He had fought an extended battle with sarcoma.

== Electoral history ==
=== 1976 ===
==== General election ====
West Virginia House of Delegates, District 15, 1976 general election * denotes incumbent Source:
Party	Candidate	Votes	%
Democratic	Frank Blackwell	16,220	31.4
Democratic	Thomas Goodwin *	14,826	28.7
Democratic	Troy Wayne Hendricks	14,777	28.6
Republican	Delmer Sanders	5,788	11.2
Total votes		51,611	100

=== 1978 ===
==== General election ====
West Virginia House of Delegates, District 15, 1978 general election * denotes incumbent Source:
Party	Candidate	Votes	%
Democratic	Frank Blackwell *	10,410	30.9
Democratic	Troy Wayne Hendricks *	9,483	28.1
Democratic	Thomas Goodwin *	8,868	26.3
Republican	Delmer Sanders	4,914	14.6
Total votes		33,675	100

=== 1980 ===
==== General election ====
West Virginia House of Delegates, District 15, 1980 general election * denotes incumbent Source:
Party	Candidate	Votes	%
Democratic	Troy Wayne Hendricks *	14,384	25.9
Democratic	Bruce Williams	14,286	25.7
Democratic	Frank Blackwell *	14,029	25.2
Republican	Bill Miller	6,655	12.0
Republican	Romey Nelson	6,227	11.2
Total votes		55,581	100

=== 2016 ===
==== Primary election ====
West Virginia House of Delegates, District 25, 2016 primary election * denotes incumbent Source:
Party	Candidate	Votes	%
Democratic	Frank Blackwell *	2,099	100
Total votes		2,099	100

==== General election ====
West Virginia House of Delegates, District 25, 2016 general election * denotes incumbent Source:
Party	Candidate	Votes	%
Republican	Tony Paynter	3,880	59.6
Democratic	Frank Blackwell *	2,633	40.4
Total votes		6,513	100
