= Michael Ihle =

American politician (born 1986)

Member of the West Virginia House of Delegates
- In office 2014–2016
- Constituency: District 13

Personal details
- Born: December 4, 1986 (age 39)
- Party: Republican

J. Michael Ihle (born December 4, 1986) is an American politician from West Virginia. He represented District 13 in the West Virginia House of Delegates from 2014 to 2016.

Ihle is a former mayor of Ravenswood, West Virginia.
