= Tracy Dempsey =

American politician

Member of the West Virginia Senate from the 7th district
- In office December 1, 2002 – December 1, 2006
- Preceded by: Lloyd G. Jackson II
- Succeeded by: Ron Stollings

Member of the West Virginia House of Delegates
- In office December 1, 1990 – December 1, 2002
- Preceded by: Sammy D. Dalton
- Succeeded by: Bill Wright
- Constituency: 16th district (1990–1992); 20th district (1992–2002)

Personal details
- Born: October 9, 1950 (age 75) Lincoln, West Virginia, U.S.
- Party: Democratic
- Spouse: Violet Wiley
- Education: Marshall University

Tracy Dempsey (born October 9, 1950) is an American politician who served in both houses of the West Virginia State Legislature.
