= Joshua Barker =

American politician

Member of the West Virginia House of Delegates
- In office August 1, 2013 – 2014
- Preceded by: Josh Stowers
- Constituency: District 22

Personal details
- Party: Democratic
- Education: Marshall University; Southern West Virginia Community and Technical College

Joshua J. Barker is an American politician from West Virginia. He is a Democrat and represented District 22 in the West Virginia House of Delegates from 2013 to 2014. He was appointed to the seat by Governor Earl Ray Tomblin.
