= Marilyn Nippold =

American language and communications scientist

- Born: 1951 (age 74–75)
- Occupations: Professor of Communication Disorders and Sciences
- Awards: ASHA Honors (2009)

Academic background
- Education: University of California Los Angeles (BA); California State University, Long Beach (MA); Purdue University (PhD)

Academic work
- Discipline: Communications scientist
- Sub-discipline: Language development; Language disorders
- Institutions: University of Oregon

Marilyn Adrienne Nippold (born 1951) is language and communications scientist with expertise in adolescent language development and disorders. She is Professor in Communication Disorders and Sciences at the University of Oregon. Nippold is author of several books on adolescent language development, including Later Language Development: The School-age and Adolescent Years and Language Sampling with Adolescents: Implications for Intervention.

Nippold received Honors from the American Speech-Language-Hearing Association (ASHA) in 2009 and the Alumni Award from Purdue University in 2017. She received the Outstanding Publications Award from the Council for Exceptional Children in 2009.

Nippold served as Editor of the journal Language, Speech, and Hearing Services in Schools from 2012–2016.

== Biography ==
Nippold attended the University of California Los Angeles where she received her Bachelor of Arts in Philosophy in 1972. After completing her Master of Arts in Communicative Disorders at California State University, Long Beach, Nippold attended Purdue University where she obtained her PhD in Speech-Language-Hearing Sciences in 1982.

At Purdue University, Nippold worked with Laurence B. Leonard. One of their first papers examined perspective taking in relation to young children's use and understanding of expressions of politeness. Nippold's dissertation, supervised by Leonard and Robert V. Kail, focused on development in children understanding of metaphors at ages of 7 and 9 years.

Nippold's research has been funded by grants from the National Institute on Deafness and Other Communication Disorders and the United States – Israel Binational Science Foundation.

== Research ==
Nippold's main area of research is language development in middle childhood through adolescence, especially with regards to the acquisition of complex forms of discourse, nonliteral and figurative language, and writing skills.

One of her early co-authored papers "Metaphoric Understanding in Preadolescents Having a History of Language Acquisition Difficulties" received the Editor's Award in 1984 for best paper published in Language, Speech, and Hearing Services in Schools. The results of this research study indicated that preadolescent children (mean age 10 years) who had been diagnosed with language impairments as preschoolers had persistent difficulties in understanding figurative aspects of language, such as metaphor.

Another one of Nippold's co-authored papers "Idiom Understanding in Preadolescents: Synergy in Action" published in the American Journal of Speech-Language Pathology received the Editor's Award in 2002. This study tested preadolescents on various aspects of language comprehension and found close associations between idiom comprehension, reading comprehension, and listening comprehension.

== Representative Publications ==
- Nippold, M. A., Duthie, J. K., & Larsen, J. (2005). Literacy as a leisure activity: Free-time preferences of older children and young adolescents. Language, Speech, and Hearing Services in Schools, 36(2), 93–102.
- Nippold, M. A., Hesketh, L. J., Duthie, J. K., & Mansfield, T. C. (2005). Conversational versus expository discourse: A study of syntactic development in children, adolescents, and adults. Journal of Speech, Language, and Hearing Research, 48(5), 1048–1064.
- Nippold, M. A., Mansfield, T. C., Billow, J. L., & Tomblin, J. B. (2008). Expository discourse in adolescents with language impairments: Examining syntactic development. American Journal of Speech-Language Pathology, 17(4), 356–366.
- Nippold, M. A., & Rudzinski, M. (1993). Familiarity and transparency in idiom explanation: A developmental study of children and adolescents. Journal of Speech, Language, and Hearing Research, 36(4), 728–737.
- Nippold, M. A., Ward-Lonergan, J. M., & Fanning, J. L. (2005). Persuasive writing in children, adolescents, and adults: A study of syntactic, semantic, and pragmatic development. Language, Speech, and Hearing Services in Schools, 36(2), 125–138.
