= Chris Stansbury =

American politician

Member of the West Virginia House of Delegates
- In office 2014–2016
- Constituency: District 35

Personal details
- Party: Republican
- Website: www.stansburyforwv.com

Chris Stansbury is an American politician from West Virginia. He represented District 35 in the West Virginia House of Delegates from 2014 to 2016.
