= Lidella Wilson Hrutkay =

American politician

Member of the West Virginia House of Representatives from the 20th district
- In office 2001–2008
- Preceded by: Sammy D. Dalton
- Succeeded by: Josh Stowers

Personal details
- Party: Democratic
- Education: Logan High School
- Alma mater: West Virginia University; Ohio Northern University

Lidella Wilson Hrutkay is an American politician from West Virginia. She was a Democrat member of the West Virginia House of Delegates. She was a candidate for District 24 in the 2012 primary.
