= Tony J. Lewis =

American politician (1958–2017)

Member of the West Virginia House of Delegates from the 53rd district
- In office December 1, 2016 – September 24, 2017
- Succeeded by: D.R. Jennings
- Constituency: District 53

Personal details
- Born: 1958 Charleston, West Virginia, U.S.
- Died: September 24, 2017 (aged 58–59)
- Party: Republican

Tony J. Lewis (1958 – September 24, 2017) was an American politician from West Virginia. He was a Republican and represented District 53 in the West Virginia House of Delegates until his death on September 24, 2017.

== Elections ==
=== 2016 ===
==== Primary ====
Lewis defeated D.R. Buck Jennings in the West Virginia House of Delegates District 53 Republican primary.

West Virginia House of Delegates District 53, Republican Primary, 2016
Party	Candidate	Votes	%	±%
Republican	Tony J. Lewis	1,469	51.93	
Democratic	D.R. Buck Jennings	1,360	48.07	
Total votes		2,829	100.00	

==== General election ====
Lewis defeated Al Tomson in the West Virginia House of Delegates District 53 general election. Incumbent Republican Randy E. Smith did not seek re-election.

West Virginia House of Delegates District 53, General Election, 2016
Party	Candidate	Votes	%	±%
Republican	Tony J. Lewis	5,153	66.27	
Democratic	Al Tomson	2,623	33.73	
Total votes		7,776	100.00	
Republican hold				

== Campaign finance summary ==
Lewis contributed $2,119 during the 2016 West Virginia House of Delegates District 53.

== Endorsements ==
Lewis had endorsed Republican candidate and 34th Attorney General of West Virginia Patrick Morrisey in the 2018 United States Senate election in West Virginia.
