= Michael B. Stuart =

American lawyer

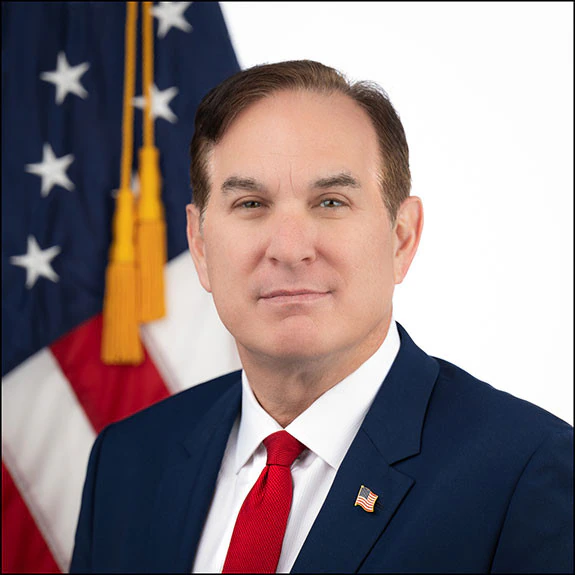
- Official portrait, 2025

General Counsel of the United States Department of Health and Human Services
- In office October 9, 2025 – May 29, 2026
- President: Donald Trump
- Preceded by: Samuel Bagenstos

Member of the West Virginia Senate from the 7th district
- In office December 1, 2022 – October 9, 2025
- Preceded by: Ron Stollings
- Succeeded by: Zack Maynard

United States Attorney for the Southern District of West Virginia
- In office January 9, 2018 – February 28, 2021
- President: Donald Trump; Joe Biden
- Preceded by: Booth Goodwin
- Succeeded by: William S. Thompson

Chair of the West Virginia Republican Party
- In office July 24, 2010 – May 12, 2012
- Preceded by: Doug McKinney
- Succeeded by: Conrad Lucas

Personal details
- Born: Michael Bryan Stuart Philippi, West Virginia, U.S.
- Party: Republican
- Spouse: Katrina
- Education: West Virginia University (BA); Boston University (JD)

Michael Bryan Stuart is an American politician and attorney. A member of the Republican Party, he served in the West Virginia Senate from 2022 to 2025 for the 7th district. He was the United States Attorney for the Southern District of West Virginia from 2018 to 2021.

In February 2025, President Donald Trump nominated Stuart to serve as general counsel for the United States Department of Health and Human Services. He was confirmed and took office in October 2025.

== Biography ==
Stuart was a lawyer for the law firm of Steptoe & Johnson PLLC. In 2014, Stuart chaired the West Virginia Presidential Debate Commission. From 2010 to 2012, he served as chairman of the West Virginia Republican Party. Stuart chaired Trump's 2016 presidential campaign in the state.

=== U.S. Attorney ===
Stuart was sworn in as U.S. Attorney on January 9, 2018. Prior to his confirmation as a U.S. Attorney, Stuart said addressing the opioid epidemic would be a priority of his office. On February 8, 2021, he, along with 55 other Trump-era attorneys, were asked to resign. On February 12, he announced his resignation, effective February 28.

=== West Virginia Senate ===
Stuart was elected to the 7th district of the West Virginia Senate in the 2022 elections. He unsuccessfully ran in the Republican primary for West Virginia Attorney General in the 2024 elections, losing to state auditor JB McCuskey.

In 2024 and 2025, Stuart introduced a death penalty bill for killing a law enforcement officer or first responder. During his tenure in the Senate, he co-sponsored legislation to make it illegal to operate methadone clinics, and supported proposals to ban syringe exchanges.

=== U.S. Department of Health and Human Services ===
Stuart was nominated by Trump in February 2025 to serve as general counsel of the United States Department of Health and Human Services (HHS).

Stuart resigned from the West Virginia Senate in October 2025 after being confirmed as general counsel of the United States Department of Health and Human Services.
