= Zack Maynard =

American politician

Member of the West Virginia Senate from the 7th district
- Incumbent
- Assumed office October 30, 2025 Serving with Rupie Phillips
- Preceded by: Michael B. Stuart

Member of the West Virginia House of Delegates from the 22nd district
- In office December 1, 2016 – December 1, 2022
- Preceded by: Michael Moffatt
- Succeeded by: Daniel Linville (redistricting)

Personal details
- Born: March 29, 1992 (age 34) Munster, Indiana, U.S.
- Party: Republican

Zack Maynard (born March 29, 1992) is an American politician who served in the West Virginia House of Delegates from the 22nd district from 2016 to 2022. On October 30, 2025, Maynard was appointed by governor Patrick Morrisey to represent the 7th district of the West Virginia Senate to fill the vacancy caused by Michael B. Stuart's resignation.
