= Debara L. Tucci =

American otolaryngologist

Debara Tucci
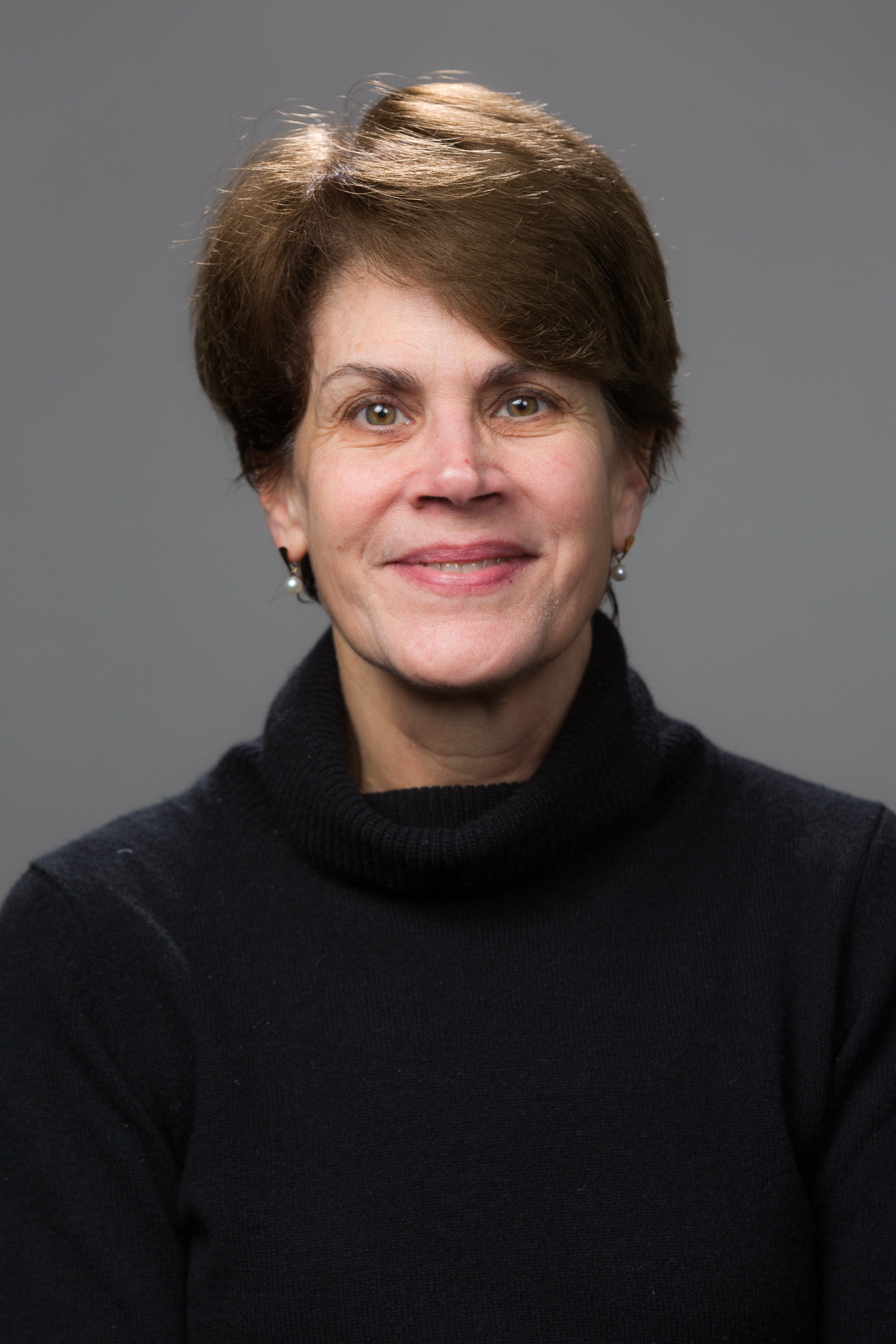
- Education: University of Virginia (BS, MD); University of Michigan (MS); Duke University (MBA)
- Scientific career
- Fields: Medicine and Otolaryngology
- Institutions: National Institute on Deafness and Other Communication Disorders, Director; Duke University, Professor of Surgery

Debara Lyn Tucci is an American otolaryngologist, studying ear, nose, and throat conditions. She co-founded the Duke Hearing Center and currently serves as a professor of Surgery and Director of the Cochlear Implant Program at Duke University. In September 2019 she became Director of the National Institute on Deafness and Other Communication Disorders, one of the National Institutes of Health's 27 Institutes and Centers.

== Education & Early Career ==
Tucci received her Bachelor of Science in 1976 from the University of Virginia in Audiology and Speech Pathology. She then attended University of Michigan to receive her Master of Science in Audiology between 1976 and 1977. She began medical school at the University of Virginia in 1981, where she was awarded her Doctor of Medicine degree in 1985. She earned a Master of Business Administration from Fuqua School of Business.

== Research ==
Tucci's research centers on hearing impairment and loss, working to understand the impact of hearing loss on the auditory development of children. She also studies the effects of cochlear implants, which are devices that allow for the electrical stimulation of the auditory nerve in people who are deaf. Cochlear implants are suggested to prevent or reverse inner ear damage, which leads to deafness.

== Leadership ==
Tucci co-founded the Duke Hearing Center. She is the director of the cochlear implant program at Duke University. She is a past president of the Association for Research in Otolaryngology.

In May 2019, the National Institutes of Health's Director Francis Collins named Tucci Director of the National Institute on Deafness and Other Communication Disorders.
