= West Virginia's 7th Senate district =

American legislative district

West Virginia's 7th State Senate district
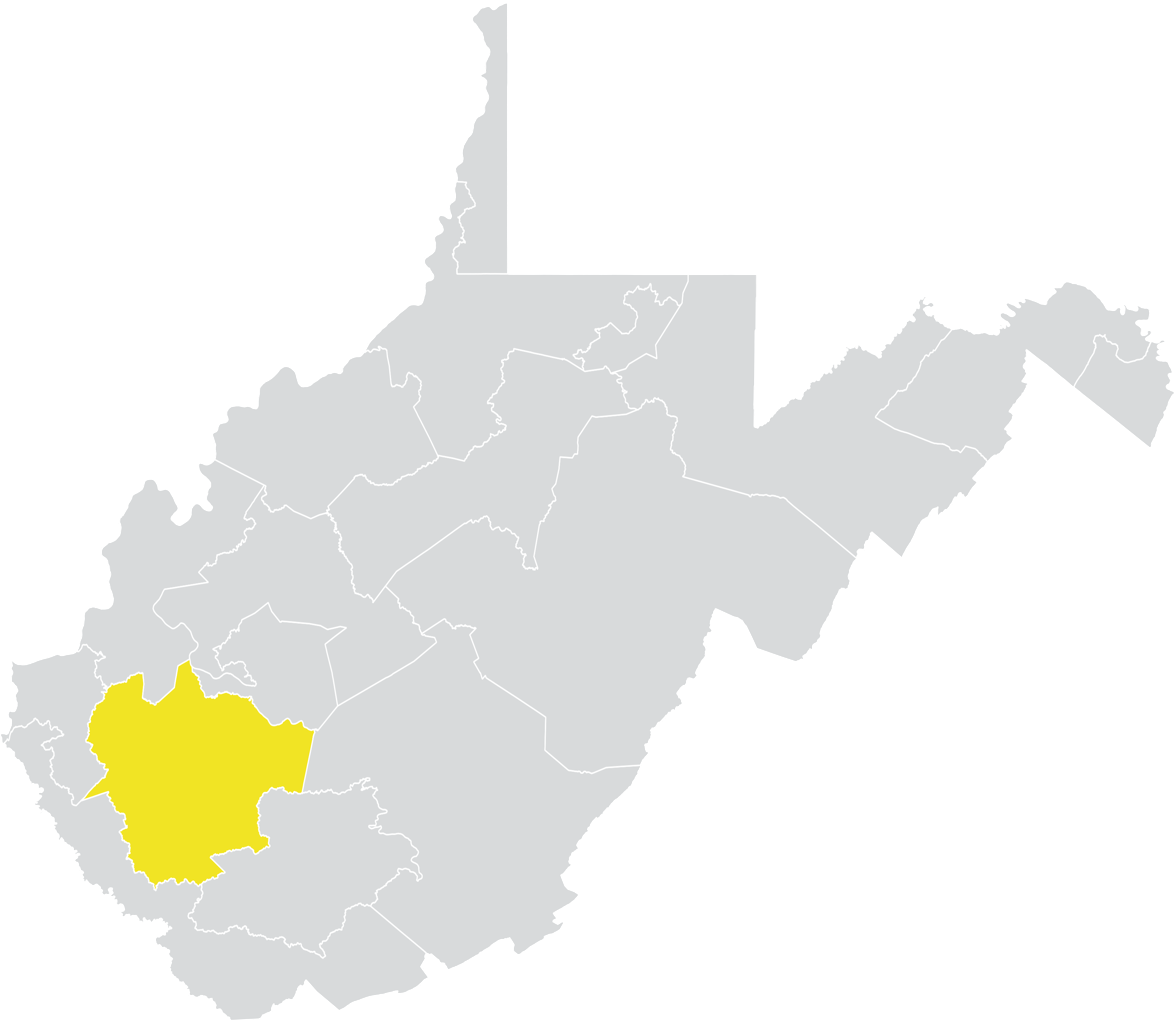
Senator
Zack Maynard; R–Harts
Rupie Phillips; R–Lorado
- Demographics: 97% White; 1% Black; 1% Hispanic; 0% Asian; 1% Other
- Population (2017): 98,933

West Virginia's 7th Senate district is one of 17 districts in the West Virginia Senate. It is currently represented by Republican Zack Maynard and Republican Rupie Phillips. All districts in the West Virginia Senate elect two members to staggered four-year terms.

== Geography ==
District 7 is based in Southern West Virginia, covering all of Boone, Lincoln, and Logan Counties and parts of Mingo and Wayne Counties. Communities in the district include Wayne, Lavalette, Hamlin, Alum Creek, Madison, Logan, Chapmanville, Mallory, Mount Gay-Shamrock, and Gilbert Creek.

The district is located entirely within West Virginia's 3rd congressional district, and overlaps with the 16th, 19th, 20th, 21st, 22nd, 23rd, and 24th districts of the West Virginia House of Delegates.

== Recent election results ==
=== 2024 ===
2024 West Virginia Senate election, District 7
Primary election
Party	Candidate	Votes	%
Republican	Rupie Phillips (incumbent)	7,860	100.0
Total votes		7,860	100.0
General election
Republican	Rupie Phillips (incumbent)	28,849	100.0
Total votes		28,849	100
Republican hold			

=== 2022 ===
2022 West Virginia Senate election, District 7
Primary election
Party	Candidate	Votes	%
Republican	Mike Stuart	2,473	52.3
Republican	Chad McCormick	2,253	47.7
Total votes		4,726	100
General election
Democratic	Ron Stollings (incumbent)	13,242	58.2
Republican	Mike Stuart	9,526	41.8
Total votes		22,768	100

== Historical election results ==
=== 2020 ===
2020 West Virginia Senate election, District 7
Party	Candidate	Votes	%
Republican	Rupie Phillips	20,608	56.2
Democratic	Ralph Rodighiero	16,038	43.8
Total votes		36,646	100
Republican gain from Democratic			

=== 2018 ===
2018 West Virginia Senate election, District 7
Primary election
Party	Candidate	Votes	%
Republican	Jason Stephens	1,851	51.8
Republican	Gary Johngrass	1,722	48.2
Total votes		3,573	100
General election
Democratic	Ron Stollings (incumbent)	15,181	56.7
Republican	Jason Stephens	11,594	43.3
Total votes		26,775	100
Democratic hold			

=== 2016 ===
2016 West Virginia Senate election, District 7
Primary election
Party	Candidate	Votes	%
Democratic	Richard Ojeda	11,154	55.2
Democratic	Art Kirkendoll (incumbent)	9,065	44.8
Total votes		20,219	100
Republican	Jordan Bridges	2,807	57.0
Republican	Gary Johngrass	2,114	43.0
Total votes		4,921	100
General election
Democratic	Richard Ojeda	19,978	58.8
Republican	Jordan Bridges	13,987	41.2
Total votes		33,965	100
Democratic hold			

=== 2014 ===
2014 West Virginia Senate election, District 7
Party	Candidate	Votes	%
Democratic	Ron Stollings (incumbent)	14,177	65.7
Republican	Gary Johngrass	7,394	34.3
Total votes		21,571	100
Democratic hold			

=== 2012 ===
2012 West Virginia Senate election, District 7
Primary election
Party	Candidate	Votes	%
Democratic	Art Kirkendoll (incumbent)	11,529	64.2
Democratic	Sammy D. Dalton	6,428	35.8
Total votes		17,957	100
General election
Democratic	Art Kirkendoll (incumbent)	25,955	100
Total votes		25,955	100
Democratic hold			

=== Federal and statewide results ===
Year	Office	Results
2020	President	Trump 78.6 – 19.9%
2016	President	Trump 77.6 – 18.7%
2014	Senate	Capito 59.4 – 37.9%
2012	President	Romney 66.4 – 31.2%
2012	Senate	Manchin 70.8 – 27.2%
2012	Governor	Tomblin 68.4 – 29.5%
