= Ted Tomblin =

American politician (born 1971)

Member of the West Virginia House of Delegates from the 24th district
- In office January 12, 2013 – 2014 Serving with Rupert Phillips

Personal details
- Born: February 2, 1971 (age 55) Logan, West Virginia, U.S.
- Party: Democratic
- Education: Marshall University

Theodore 'Ted' Jay Tomblin (born February 2, 1971) is an American politician who was a Democratic member of the West Virginia House of Delegates representing District 24 from January 12, 2013, to 2014.

== Education ==
Tomblin attended Marshall University.

== Elections ==
- 2012 Redistricted to District 24, Tomblin ran in the May 8, 2012 Democratic Primary and placed second with 2,794 votes (25.1%), and placed first in the November 6, 2012 General election with 7,591 votes (52.6%) ahead of incumbent Democratic Representative Rupert Phillips.
- 2008 Initially in District 19, Tomblin ran in the twelve-way May 13, 2008 Democratic Primary but placed fifth; the top four went on to the November 4, 2008 General election.
- 2010 Tomblin ran in the eleven-way May 11, 2010 Democratic Primary but placed sixth; the top four went on to the six-way November 2, 2010 General election.
