= Art Kirkendoll =

American politician (born 1951)

Member of the West Virginia Senate from the 7th district
- In office November 14, 2011 – January 11, 2017
- Preceded by: Earl Ray Tomblin
- Succeeded by: Richard Ojeda

Personal details
- Born: November 3, 1951 (age 74) Logan, West Virginia, U.S.
- Party: Democratic
- Spouse: Barbara A. Nelson
- Children: Arthur E. Kirkendoll, Jr. Brian F. Kirkendoll
- Education: Marshall University

Arthur E. Kirkendoll (born November 3, 1951) is an American politician and former Democratic member of the West Virginia Senate. He represented District 7 from November 14, 2011, when West Virginia Governor Earl Ray Tomblin appointed him to fill the vacancy caused by Tomblin's resignation from the seat in order to assume the position of governor, until January 7, 2017. He was defeated for reelection in the 2016 primary election by Richard Ojeda.

== Education ==
Kirkendoll attended Marshall University.

== Elections ==
- 2012 Kirkendoll was challenged by former state Delegate Sammy Dalton in the District 8 May 8, 2012 Democratic Primary, winning with 11,529 votes (64.2%), and was unopposed for the November 6, 2012 General election, winning with 25,955 votes.
