= Danny Wagner (politician) =

American politician

Member of the West Virginia House of Delegates
- In office 2014–2018
- Succeeded by: Chris Phillips
- Constituency: District 47

Personal details
- Party: Republican

Danny Wagner is an American politician from West Virginia. He is a Republican and represented District 47 in the West Virginia House of Delegates from 2014 to 2018.
