= Sammy D. Dalton =

American educator and politician

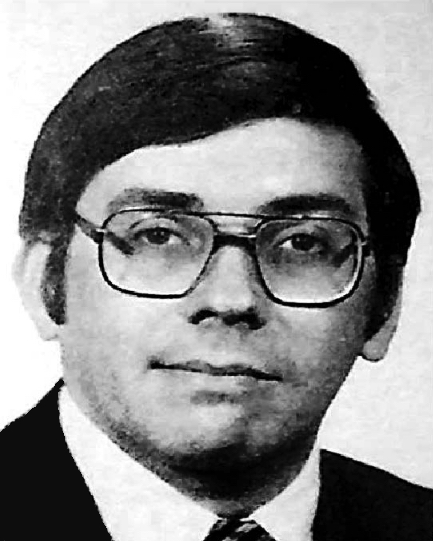
- Portrait of Dalton, c. 1983

Member of the West Virginia House of Delegates from the 20th district
- In office December 1, 1996 – December 1, 2000
- Preceded by: Danny Ellis
- Succeeded by: Lidella Wilson Hrutkay

Member of the West Virginia Senate from the 7th district
- In office December 1, 1990 – December 1, 1994
- Preceded by: Lloyd G. Jackson II
- Succeeded by: Lloyd G. Jackson II

Member of the West Virginia House of Delegates from the 16th district
- In office December 1, 1988 – December 1, 1990
- Preceded by: R. L. McCormick
- Succeeded by: Tracy Dempsey
- In office December 1, 1974 – December 1, 1986
- Preceded by: H. Leon Hager
- Succeeded by: Joe C. Ferrell

Personal details
- Born: Sammy Dale Dalton; August 29, 1951 (age 74) West Hamlin, West Virginia, United States
- Party: Democratic
- Spouse: Karen McGinnis
- Education: Marshall University (AB, MA)

Sammy Dale Dalton (born August 29, 1951) is an American educator and politician who served in both houses of the West Virginia Legislature. First elected to the House of Delegates as a 23-year old graduate student at Marshall University, he was elevated to the state senate in 1990. In 1994, his predecessor, Lloyd G. Jackson II, ran again and defeated him in the Democratic primary, after which Dalton returned to the House for two more terms. He attempted to win back a seat in the Senate in 2002 and 2012 but lost the primary races to Tracy Dempsey and Art Kirkendoll, respectively.

In 2021, Dalton was arrested on a prostitution-related charge in a sting conducted by the Charleston Police Department.
