= Scott Brewer (West Virginia politician) =

American politician

Member of the West Virginia House of Delegates
- In office 2016 – December 1, 2018
- Constituency: District 13

Personal details
- Party: Democratic

Scott Brewer is an American politician from West Virginia. He is a Democrat and represented District 13 in the West Virginia House of Delegates from 2016 to 2018.
