= Terri Funk Sypolt =

American politician

Member of the West Virginia House of Delegates from the 52nd district
- In office December 1, 2016 – December 1, 2022
- Preceded by: Steven Shaffer

Personal details
- Born: December 14, 1953 (age 72) Grafton, West Virginia, U.S.
- Party: Republican
- Spouse: David Sypolt (m. 2015)

Terri Funk Sypolt (born December 14, 1953) is an American politician who served in the West Virginia House of Delegates from the 52nd district from 2016 to 2022.

== Committee assignments ==
- Natural Resources
- Committee on Fire Departments and Emergency Medical Services
- Government Organization
- Senior, Children, and Family Issues
- Veterans Affairs and Homeland Security
