= Arthur Tomblin =

English cricketer and clergyman

Personal information
- Full name: Arthur Charles Tomblin
- Born: May 1836; Empingham, Rutland, England
- Died: 15 April 1911 (aged 74); Kettering, Northamptonshire, England
- Batting: Left-handed

Domestic team information
- Years: Team
- 1857: Cambridge University

Career statistics
Competition	First-class
Matches	4
Runs scored	106
Batting average	17.66
100s/50s	–/–
Top score	46
Catches/stumpings	1/–
- Source: Cricinfo, 16 December 2022

Arthur Charles Tomblin (May 1836 – 15 April 1911) was an English clergyman and a cricketer who played in four first-class matches for Cambridge University and the Gentlemen of the North team in 1857 and 1862. He was born at Empingham, Rutland and died at Kettering, Northamptonshire. The precise date of his birth is not known.

Tomblin was educated at Uppingham School and at Emmanuel College, Cambridge. As a cricketer, he was a left-handed middle- or lower-order batsman. He made an unbeaten 31 on his first-class debut for Cambridge University against the Marylebone Cricket Club, but achieved very little in his other games for the university, the last of which was the 1857 University Match, in which he scored 12 and 0. In 1862, Tomblin returned for a single further first-class game, a match between amateur teams from the North and the South of England, and made his highest score, 46, in his final first-class innings.

Tomblin graduated from Cambridge University with a Bachelor of Arts degree in 1858. He was ordained as a Church of England deacon in 1859 and as a priest the following year; he served as curate at Great Oakley, Northamptonshire from 1858 to 1863 when he became vicar of the same parish through to 1900. He continued to live in Great Oakley after his retirement. He died at Kettering in April 1911, aged 74.
