= Nancy Reagan Foster =

American politician

Member of the West Virginia House of Delegates
- In office 2016–2017
- Constituency: District 38

Personal details
- Party: Republican

Nancy Reagan Foster is an American politician from West Virginia. She is a Republican and represented District 38 in the West Virginia House of Delegates from 2016 to 2017.

On September 1, 2017, she resigned from the state house.
