= Ray Hollen =

American politician

Member of the West Virginia House of Delegates from the 9th district
- In office December 1, 2016 – May 12, 2019

Personal details
- Born: April, 1965 Parkersburg, West Virginia, U.S.
- Party: Republican

Ray Hollen is an American politician and a former Republican member of the West Virginia House of Delegates, representing District 9 from January 12, 2016, to May 12, 2019, to take a position with the U.S. Department of Defense.

== Education ==
Hollen was attended the Marshall University in 2004.

== Campaign ==
Hollen's website campaign concentrated in traditional family, Second Amendment, energy resources, citizenship, military, veteran, economy, jobs, infrastructure, and education.

== Elections ==
=== 2016 ===
==== Republican primary ====
Ray Hollen defeated Angela Summers in the West Virginia House of Delegates District 9 Republican primary.

West Virginia House of Delegates District 9, Republican Primary, 2016
Party	Candidate	Votes	%	±%
Republican	Ray Hollen	1,545	59.40%	
Democratic	Angela Summers	1,056	40.60%	
Total votes		2,601	100.00%	

==== General Election ====
Ray Hollen defeated Jim Marion in the West Virginia House of Delegates District 9 general election. Incumbent Republicam Anna Border did not seek re-election.

West Virginia House of Delegates District 9, General Election, 2016
Party	Candidate	Votes	%	±%
Republican	Ray Hollen	4,551	60.00%	
Democratic	Jim Marion	3,034	40.00%	
Total votes		7,585	100.00%	
Republican hold				

=== 2018 ===
==== Republican primary ====
Hollen effectively ran unopposed.

==== General Election ====
Incumbent Republican Ray Hollen defeated Jim Marion in the general election. This was also one of the most recent elections in which both candidates have re-match.

West Virginia House of Delegates District 9, General Election, 2018
Party	Candidate	Votes	%	±%
Republican	Ray Hollen	3,986	65.6%	
Democratic	Jim Marion	2,091	34.4%	
Total votes		6,077	100.00%	
Republican hold				

== Campaign finance summary ==
Ray Hollen contributed $6,742 during the 2016 West Virginia House of Delegates District 9. Hollen was also contributed $12,200 during the 2018 West Virginia House of Delegates District 9. Both totals were $18,942.
