= Brad White (politician) =

American politician

Member of the West Virginia House of Delegates
- In office 2014–2018
- Constituency: District 36

Personal details
- Party: Republican

Brad White is an American politician from West Virginia. He is a Republican and represented District 36 in the West Virginia House of Delegates from 2014 to 2018.
