= Ralph Rodighiero =

American politician (born 1963)

Member of the West Virginia House of Delegates from the 24th district
- In office January 1, 2018 – December 31, 2020
- Preceded by: Greg Butcher

Member of the West Virginia House of Delegates from the 19th district
- In office December 1, 2006 – December 1, 2012
- Succeeded by: Rick Thompson; Don Perdue

Personal details
- Born: May 26, 1963 (age 63) Logan, West Virginia, U.S.
- Party: Democratic

Ralph Rodighiero (born May 26, 1963) is an American politician who served in the West Virginia House of Delegates from the 24th district from 2014 until 2020. He also previously served in the West Virginia House of Delegates from the 19th district from 2006 to 2012.

Rodighiero was the 2020 Democratic nominee for the West Virginia State Senate 7th District which comprises Logan, Boone, Lincoln, Wayne (part), and Mingo (part) counties. He lost against former fellow Democratic turned Republican Delegate Rupie Phillips.

Rodighiero is currently a member of the Logan County Board of Education in Logan County, West Virginia.

== Elections ==
West Virginia's 7th Senate district General Election, 2020
Party	Candidate	Votes	%
Republican	Rupie Phillips	20,484	56.2%
Democratic	Ralph Rodighiero	15,965	43.8%
Total votes		36,449	100.0%

== Personal ==
Rodighiero is member of the National Rifle Association of America and the West Virginia Citizens Defence League (WVCDL). The WVCDL graded Rodighiero an "A" in 2020.
