= Tony Paynter =

American politician

Member of the West Virginia House of Delegates from the 25th district
- In office December 1, 2016 – December 1, 2022
- Preceded by: Frank Blackwell

Personal details
- Born: August 23, 1970 (age 55) Welch, West Virginia, U.S.
- Party: Republican

Tony Paynter (born August 23, 1970) is an American politician who served in the West Virginia House of Delegates from the 25th district from 2016 to 2022.
