= Journal of Speech, Language, and Hearing Research =

Monthly academic journal covering interpersonal communication

- Discipline: Audiology; Linguistics; Speech
- Language: English
- Edited by: Bharath Chandrasekaran; Sean Redmond; Frederick Gallun

Publication details
- Former name(s): Journal of Speech and Hearing Research; Journal of Speech and Hearing Disorders
- History: 1936–present
- Publisher: American Speech–Language–Hearing Association
- Frequency: Monthly
- Impact factor: 1.906 (2017)

Standard abbreviations
- ISO 4: J. Speech Lang. Hear. Res.

Indexing
- CODEN: JSLRF
- ISSN: 1092-4388 (print); 1558-9102 (web)
- LCCN: 97657642
- OCLC no.: 883679581

Links
- Journal homepage; Online archive

The Journal of Speech, Language, and Hearing Research is a monthly online-only peer-reviewed scientific journal covering all aspects of interpersonal communication. It was established in 1936 as the Journal of Speech and Hearing Disorders, which was merged with the Journal of Speech and Hearing Research (which had been established in 1958) to form the Journal of Speech and Hearing Research in 1991. The word "Language" was added to the title in 1997. It is published by the American Speech–Language–Hearing Association and the editors-in-chief are Dr. Jessica Huber (University of Buffalo), Dr. Julie Washington (University of California Irvine), and Dr. Rachael Frush Holt (The Ohio State University). According to the Clarivate Analytics 2024, the journal has a 2023 impact factor of 2.2.
