= National Institute on Deafness and Other Communication Disorders =

Member of the U.S. National Institutes of Health

National Institute on Deafness and Other Communication Disorders (NIDCD)

Agency overview
- Formed: 1988; 38 years ago
- Jurisdiction: Federal Government of the United States
- Agency executive: Dr. Debara L. Tucci, Director
- Parent department: Department of Health and Human Services
- Parent agency: National Institutes of Health
- Website: www.nidcd.nih.gov

The National Institute on Deafness and Other Communication Disorders (NIDCD), a member of the U.S. National Institutes of Health, is mandated to conduct and support biomedical and behavioral research and research training in the normal and disordered processes of hearing, balance, smell, taste, voice, speech, and language. The institute also conducts and supports research and research training related to disease prevention and health promotion; addresses special biomedical and behavioral problems associated with people who have communication impairments or disorders; and supports efforts to create devices which substitute for lost and impaired sensory and communication function.

On September 3, 2019, Debara L. Tucci became NIDCD director. She is the first woman to be appointed to the role since the founding of the institution in 1988.

Differing from some other institutes, in 1999 the NIDCD discontinued the Multi-Purpose Research and Training Center funding mechanism (large center grants) for the entire institute focusing instead on single-project research awards (R01's).

== Past directors ==
Past directors from 1988 - present

No.	Portrait	Director	Took office	Left office	Refs.
1		Jay Moskowitz (acting)	October 31, 1988	February 10, 1990	
2		James B. Snow, Jr.	February 11, 1990	September 15, 1997	
3		James F. Battey, Jr.	February 10, 1998	May 31, 2018	
Acting		Judith A. Cooper	June 1, 2018	September 2, 2019	
4		Debara L. Tucci	September 3, 2019	Present	
