= 2026 West Virginia House of Delegates election =

- November 3, 2026

All 100 seats in the West Virginia House of Delegates 51 seats needed for a majority
	Majority party	Minority party
Leader	Roger Hanshaw	Sean Hornbuckle
Party	Republican	Democratic
Leader since	August 29, 2018	August 8, 2023
Leader's seat	62nd–Wallback	25th–Huntington
Last election	91 seats, 77.48%	9 seats, 22.15%
Seats before	90	9
Seats won	79	21
Seat change	▼12	▲12
- Republican hold Democratic hold Democratic gain
Speaker before election
Roger Hanshaw
Republican
Elected Speaker
Roger Hanshaw
Republican

The 2026 West Virginia House of Delegates election was held on November 3, 2026, alongside the other 2026 United States elections. Primary elections took place on May 12, 2026. Voters elected all 100 members of the West Virginia House of Delegates to serve a two-year term.

As of December 15, 2025, there were 123 active candidacies for the 2026 state house election. Candidate filing for office ended on January 31, 2026, with Republicans running in 94 districts and Democrats running in 86.

This election took place alongside races for U.S. Senate, U.S. House, state senate, and numerous other state and local elections.

== Retirements ==
=== Democratic ===
- District 5: Shawn Fluharty is running for state senate.
- District 80: John Williams is running for state senate.

=== Republican ===
- District 4: Bill Flanigan was elected justice of the Supreme Court of Appeals of West Virginia.
- District 11: Bob Fehrenbacher ran for state senate.
- District 21: Jarred Cannon
- District 27: Michael Amos
- District 34: Mark Dean
- District 35: Adam Vance ran for state senate.
- District 39: Doug Smith
- District 67: Elias Coop-Gonzalez is retiring to serve in the military.
- District 70: Mickey Petitto is running for a seat on the Harrison County Commission.
- District 73: Bryan Smith
- District 85: John Paul Hott
- District 86: Bryan Ward
- District 91: Ian Masters
- District 96: Lisa White

== Incumbents defeated ==
=== Republican ===
- District 2: Mark Zatezalo lost renomination to Tony Viola.
- District 6: Jeffrey Stephens lost renomination to Don Dewitt.
- District 8: Bill Bell lost renomination to Steven L. Smith.
- District 9: Betsy Kelly lost renomination to Kerry G. Murphy.
- District 10: Bill Anderson lost renomination to Justin Beanard.
- District 12: Vernon Criss lost renomination to Charles D. Hartzog.
- District 13: Scot Heckert lost renomination to Melissa McCrady.
- District 22: Daniel Linville lost renomination to Aaron Holley.
- District 33: Jordan Bridges lost renomination to Chris Tipton.
- District 48: Gregory Watt lost renomination to Mackenzie Holdren.
- District 49: Stanley Adkins lost renomination to Newt McCutcheon.
- District 51: Marshall Clay lost renomination to Cy Persinger.
- District 69: Keith Marple lost renomination to Danny Hamrick.
- District 71: Laura Kimble lost renomination to Tim McNeely.

== Predictions ==
=== Statewide ===
Source	Ranking	As of
Sabato's Crystal Ball	Safe R	January 22, 2026
State Navigate	Safe R	February 10, 2026

=== Competitive districts ===
District	Incumbent	Last Result	State Navigate (Note: Ratings simplified from percentages: <60% = "Tilt"; 60–75% = "Lean"; 75–95% = "Likely"; >95% = "Safe") February 10, 2026
5th	Shawn Fluharty (retiring)	57.28% D	Lean R (flip)
24th	Patrick Lucas	57.13% R	Likely R
27th	Michael D. Amos	63.91% R	Lean R
44th	Bill Roop	57.11% R	Likely R
55th	JB Akers	59.75% R	Likely R
70th	Mickey Petitto (retiring)	56.16% R	Likely R
75th	Phil Mallow	55.66% R	Likely R
76th	Rick Garcia	50.97% D	Lean D
78th	Geno Chiarelli	55.68% R	Likely R
82nd	Dave McCormick	53.94% R	Tilt R
97th	Chris Anders	54.16% R	Likely R
99th	Wayne Clark	57.97% R	Likely R
100th	Bill Ridenour	53.38% R	Lean R

== Crossover seats ==
This is a list of delegate seats that were won both by Republican presidential candidate Donald Trump and a Democratic delegate nominee in the 2024 general election:

District	Delegate	Residence	Delegate vote	Presidential vote
5th	Shawn Fluharty	Wheeling	D+14.6	R+12.5
56th	Kayla Young	South Charleston	D+3.8	R+10.4
76th	Rick Garcia	Fairmont	D+1.9	R+18.9

== Appointments ==
According to §3-10-5 of West Virginia Code, vacancies in the House of Delegates are filled through appointment by the Governor of one of three candidates chosen by the executive committee of the outgoing member's party. Below is a list of appointments made during the 86th Legislature.

District	Incumbent		Party	Appointee		Ref.
District	Departing member	First elected	Party	Incoming member	Appt. date	Ref.
89th	Darren Thorne	2022	Rep	David Cannon	January 13, 2025	
91st	Joseph de Soto (elect)	2024	Rep	Ian Masters	January 23, 2025	
8th	David Kelly	2018	Rep	Bill Bell	July 7, 2025	
48th	Tom Clark	2024 (appointed)	Rep	Gregory Watt	October 3, 2025	
74th	Mike DeVault	2022	Rep	Guy Ward	January 27, 2026	
9th	Trenton Barnhart	2022	Rep	Betsy Kelly	February 17, 2026	
4th	Bill Flanigan	2024	Rep	Shane Stack	July 7, 2026	

== General election results ==
District	2024 Pres.	Incumbent				Candidates
District	2024 Pres.	Member	Party	First elected	Status	Candidates
1st	R+53.8	Pat McGeehan	Republican	2014	Incumbent running for re-election.	▌Pat McGeehan (Republican); ▌Quincy Wilson (Democratic)
2nd	R+38.6	Mark Zatezalo	Republican	2020	Incumbent lost renomination.	▌Daniel Joseph Day (Democratic); ▌Tony Viola (Republican)
3rd	R+43.6	Jimmy Willis	Republican	2022	Incumbent running for re-election.	▌Dave Cantrell (Independent); ▌Mike Robinson (Democratic); ▌Jimmy Willis (Republican)
4th	R+33.3	Shane Stack	Republican	2026 (appt.)	Incumbent appointed after primary filing period.	▌Derek Ennis (Republican); ▌Joe Jividen (Democratic)
5th	R+12.6	Shawn Fluharty	Democratic	2014	Incumbent retiring to run for state senate.	▌Beth Hinebaugh (Republican); ▌Karen Shuler Stakem (Democratic)
6th	R+41.4	Jeffrey Stephens	Republican	2023 (appt.)	Incumbent lost renomination.	▌Cody Cumpston (Democratic); ▌Don Dewitt (Republican)
7th	R+58.5	Charles Sheedy	Republican	2022	Incumbent running for re-election.	▌Sarah Reggi (Democratic); ▌Charles Sheedy (Republican)
8th	R+67.3	Bill Bell	Republican	2025 (appt.)	Incumbent lost renomination.	▌Steven L. Smith (Republican)
9th	R+67	Betsy Kelly	Republican	2026 (appt.)	Incumbent lost renomination.	▌Kerry G. Murphy (Republican)
10th	R+47.9	Bill Anderson	Republican	1992	Incumbent lost renomination.	▌Justin Beanard (Republican); ▌Christopher Jones (Democratic)
11th	R+29.9	Bob Fehrenbacher	Republican	2022	Incumbent retired to run for state senate.	▌Daniel Miller (Democratic); ▌Jeff S. Sandy (Republican)
12th	R+27	Vernon Criss	Republican	2016	Incumbent lost renomination.	▌Charles D. Hartzog (Republican); ▌Dennis V. Rempel (Democratic); ▌Stephen Smith (Libertarian)
13th	R+49.4	Scot Heckert	Republican	2022	Incumbent lost renomination.	▌James Hendershot (Independent); ▌Melissa McCrady (Republican); ▌Marley Umensetter (Democratic)
14th	R+58.9	Dave Foggin	Republican	2022	Incumbent running for re-election.	▌Crystal Butcher (Democratic); ▌Dave Foggin (Republican)
15th	R+57.2	Erica Moore	Republican	2023 (appt.)	Incumbent running for re-election.	▌Erica Moore (Republican); ▌Tye Ward (Libertarian)
16th	R+61	Joe Parsons	Republican	2024	Incumbent running for re-election.	▌Jason M. Barr (Democratic); ▌Joe Parsons (Republican)
17th	R+53	Jonathan Pinson	Republican	2020	Incumbent running for re-election.	▌Jonathan Pinson (Republican); ▌Kathryn 'Kat' Weiland (Democratic)
18th	R+56.6	Jim Butler	Republican	2022	Incumbent running for re-election.	▌Jim Butler (Republican); ▌Jonathan Hersman (Democratic)
19th	R+51.9	Kathie Hess Crouse	Republican	2021 (appt.)	Incumbent running for re-election.	▌Kathie Hess Crouse (Republican); ▌Nolan Rose (Democratic)
20th	R+42.4	Sarah Drennan	Republican	2024	Incumbent running for re-election.	▌Sarah Drennan (Republican); ▌Tonya Patrick Shuler (Democratic)
21st	R+44.7	Jarred Cannon	Republican	2022 (appt.)	Incumbent retiring.	▌C. D. Caldwell (Republican); ▌Michael G. Mosteller II (Democratic)
22nd	R+51.2	Daniel Linville	Republican	2018 (appt.)	Incumbent lost renomination.	▌Aaron Holley (Republican)
23rd	R+43.3	Evan Worrell	Republican	2018	Incumbent running for re-election.	▌Amanda Beth Beach-Burge (Democratic); ▌Evan Worrell (Republican)
24th	R+12.6	Patrick Lucas	Republican	2022	Incumbent running for re-election.	▌Patrick Lucas (Republican); ▌Steve Williams (Democratic)
25th	D+30.9	Sean Hornbuckle	Democratic	2014	Incumbent running for re-election.	▌Sean Hornbuckle (Democratic)
26th	R+14.7	Matthew Rohrbach	Republican	2014	Incumbent running for re-election.	▌Matthew Rohrbach (Republican)
27th	R+31.9	Michael Amos	Republican	2024	Incumbent retiring.	▌Tyler Bowen (Republican); ▌Ric Griffith (Democratic)
28th	R+55.3	Ryan Browning	Republican	2024 (appt.)	Incumbent running for re-election.	▌Ryan Browning (Republican); ▌Brooke Smith (Democratic)
29th	R+72.9	Henry Dillon	Republican	2022	Incumbent running for re-election.	▌Wendy Coleman (Democratic); ▌Henry Dillon (Republican)
30th	R+61.6	Jeff Eldridge	Republican	2024 (appt.)	Incumbent running for re-election.	▌Jeff Eldridge (Republican); ▌Ryan Cledith Elkins (Democratic)
31st	R+69.1	Margitta Mazzocchi	Republican	2020	Incumbent running for re-election.	▌George C. Barker (Democratic); ▌Margitta Mazzocchi (Republican)
32nd	R+56.2	Josh Holstein	Republican	2020	Incumbent running for re-election.	▌Jennifer Bias Bryant (Democratic); ▌Josh Holstein (Republican)
33rd	R+64.4	Jordan Bridges	Republican	2020	Incumbent lost renomination.	▌Michael B. (Mickey) Browning (Democratic); ▌Leroy DeHart (Independent); ▌Chris Tipton (Republican)
34th	R+72.1	Mark Dean	Republican	2016	Incumbent retiring.	▌Barry C. Marcum (Republican); ▌Tara 'Babyt' Sexton (Democratic)
35th	R+72.9	Adam Vance	Republican	2022	Incumbent retired to run for state senate.	▌Rachael Hawkins-Church (Democratic); ▌John Morgan (Republican)
36th	R+60.1	David Green	Republican	2024 (appt.)	Incumbent running for re-election.	▌David Green (Republican); ▌Katelynn Jordan (Democratic)
37th	R+45.9	Marty Gearheart	Republican	2020	Incumbent running for re-election.	▌Marty Gearheart (Republican); ▌Treyvon Simmons (Democratic)
38th	R+56.4	Joe Ellington	Republican	2010	Incumbent running for re-election.	▌Randa D Faulkner (Democratic); ▌Joe Ellington (Republican)
39th	R+65.4	Doug Smith	Republican	2020	Incumbent retiring.	▌Samuel Lusk (Republican); ▌Ronnie Oakley (No partisan affiliation); ▌Brianna A Pearcy (Democratic)
40th	R+56.6	Roy Cooper	Republican	2012	Incumbent running for re-election.	▌Roy Cooper (Republican); ▌Jennifer Gilkerson (Democratic)
41st	R+65	Jordan Maynor	Republican	2021 (appt.)	Incumbent running for re-election.	▌Jordan Maynor (Republican); ▌Curtis Shaver (Democratic)
42nd	R+67	John Jordan	Republican	2026 (appt.)	Incumbent running for re-election.	▌John Jordan (Republican); ▌Courtney Vandall (Democratic)
43rd	R+68.6	Chris Toney	Republican	2018	Incumbent running for re-election.	▌Chris Toney (Republican)
44th	R+18.1	Bill Roop	Republican	2024 (appt.)	Incumbent running for re-election.	▌Christina Baisden (Democratic); ▌Bill Roop (Republican)
45th	R+52.2	Eric Brooks	Republican	2022	Incumbent running for re-election.	▌Eric Brooks (Republican); ▌Joseph Golden (Democratic)
46th	R+39.5	Jeff Campbell	Republican	2023 (appt.)	Incumbent running for re-election.	▌Jeff Campbell (Republican); ▌Sarah Umberger (Democratic)
47th	R+45.3	Ray Canterbury	Republican	2024	Incumbent running for re-election.	▌Ray Canterbury (Republican); ▌Sarah Morris (Democratic)
48th	R+61.8	Gregory Watt	Republican	2025 (appt.)	Incumbent lost renomination.	▌Jourdan Deitz (Democratic); ▌Mackenzie Holdren (Republican)
49th	R+61.8	Stanley Adkins	Republican	2024	Incumbent lost renomination.	▌Newt McCutcheon (Republican); ▌Byron Tucker Jr. (Democratic)
50th	R+39.3	Vacant		2022	Incumbent TBD.	▌Mathew Anderson (Democratic); ▌Stacey L. Hensley (Constitution); ▌Tom Louisos (Independent)
51st	R+45.2	Marshall Clay	Republican	2024	Incumbent lost renomination.	▌Colby A. Lopez (Democratic); ▌Cy Persinger (Republican)
52nd	R+25.4	Tresa Howell	Republican	2024	Incumbent running for re-election.	▌Joyce Brown (Democratic); ▌Tresa Howell (Republican)
53rd	R+27.2	Tristan Leavitt	Republican	2024	Incumbent running for re-election.	▌Tristan Leavitt (Republican); ▌Keena Mullins (Democratic)
54th	D+39.1	Mike Pushkin	Democratic	2014	Incumbent running for re-election.	▌Tara Martinez (Independent); ▌Mike Pushkin (Democratic)
55th	R+11.7	JB Akers	Republican	2024 (appt.)	Incumbent running for re-election.	▌JB Akers (Republican); ▌Anthony Dasaro (Democratic)
56th	R+10.4	Kayla Young	Democratic	2020	Incumbent running for re-election.	▌Kayla Young (Democratic)
57th	D+4.8	Hollis Lewis	Democratic	2023 (appt.)	Incumbent running for re-election.	▌Hollis Lewis (Democratic)
58th	R+15.1	Walter Hall	Republican	2022	Incumbent running for re-election.	▌Walter Hall (Republican); ▌Marisa Jackson (Democratic)
59th	R+26.3	Andy Shamblin	Republican	2022	Incumbent running for re-election.	▌Howard 'Cookie' Claytor III (Democratic); ▌Andy Shamblin (Republican)
60th	R+44.8	Dana Ferrell	Republican	2020	Incumbent running for re-election.	▌Dana Ferrell (Republican); ▌Lynette Shaw (Democratic)
61st	R+52.6	Dean Jeffries	Republican	2018 (appt.)	Incumbent running for re-election.	▌Sue Crawford (Democratic); ▌Dean Jeffries (Republican)
62nd	R+63.4	Roger Hanshaw	Republican	2014	Incumbent running for re-election.	▌Roger Hanshaw (Republican)
63rd	R+51.7	Lori Dittman	Republican	2022	Incumbent running for re-election.	▌Kevin Westley Carpenter (Democratic); ▌Lori Dittman (Republican)
64th	R+60	Adam Burkhammer	Republican	2020	Incumbent running for re-election.	▌Adam Burkhammer (Republican); ▌Nate Stansberry (Constitution)
65th	R+53.3	Carl Martin	Republican	2018	Incumbent running for re-election.	▌Carl Martin (Republican); ▌Mira Tanner-Hughes (Democratic)
66th	R+51.6	Jonathan Kyle	Republican	2024	Incumbent running for re-election.	▌Danielle M. Dougherty (Democratic); ▌Jonathan Kyle (Republican)
67th	R+45.7	Elias Coop-Gonzalez	Republican	2022	Incumbent retiring.	▌Les Mallow (Republican); ▌Mandy Weirich (Democratic)
68th	R+61.8	Chris Phillips	Republican	2018	Incumbent running for re-election.	▌Chris Phillips (Republican)
69th	R+54.6	Keith Marple	Republican	2022	Incumbent lost renomination.	▌Jocelyn Blackwell (Democratic); ▌Danny Hamrick (Republican)
70th	R+20.4	Mickey Petitto	Republican	2022	Incumbent retiring to run for the Harrison County Commission.	▌Paul J. Howe III (Republican); ▌Shannon Welsh (Democratic)
71st	R+32.9	Laura Kimble	Republican	2020	Incumbent lost renomination.	▌Robert 'Rob' Garcia (Democratic); ▌Tim McNeely (Republican)
72nd	R+58.1	Clay Riley	Republican	2020	Incumbent running for re-election.	▌Clay Riley (Republican)
73rd	R+51.5	Bryan Smith	Republican	2024	Incumbent retiring.	▌Kit (Kathleen) Ford (Democratic); ▌Frank Sturm (Republican)
74th	R+41.1	Guy Ward	Republican	2026 (appt.)	Incumbent running for re-election.	▌Frankie Delapas (Democratic); ▌Guy Ward (Republican)
75th	R+30.2	Phil Mallow	Republican	2020	Incumbent running for re-election.	▌Linda Longstreth (Democratic); ▌Phil Mallow (Republican)
76th	R+18.9	Rick Garcia	Democratic	2024	Incumbent running for re-election.	▌Jon Dodds (Republican); ▌Rick Garcia (Democratic)
77th	R+39	Joe Statler	Republican	2020	Incumbent running for re-election.	▌Patricia Andrea Bunner (Democratic); ▌Joe Statler (Republican)
78th	R+17.5	Geno Chiarelli	Republican	2022	Incumbent running for re-election.	▌Geno Chiarelli (Republican); ▌Michael Wendell (Democratic)
79th	D+34.6	Evan Hansen	Democratic	2018	Incumbent running for re-election.	▌Evan Hansen (Democratic); ▌Paige Rearing (Mountain)
80th	D+10.5	John Williams	Democratic	2016	Incumbent retiring to run for state senate.	▌Olivia Miller (Democratic)
81st	D+21.9	Anitra Hamilton	Democratic	2023 (appt.)	Incumbent running for re-election.	▌Anitra Hamilton (Democratic)
82nd	R+5.9	David McCormick	Republican	2024	Incumbent running for re-election.	▌David McCormick (Republican); ▌Eddie Wagoner (Democratic)
83rd	R+55.3	George Street	Republican	2022	Incumbent running for re-election.	▌George Street (Republican)
84th	R+58.5	D. Rolland Jennings	Republican	2018	Incumbent running for re-election.	▌D. Rolland Jennings (Republican); ▌Colin Savage (Democratic)
85th	R+67.1	John Paul Hott	Republican	2018	Incumbent retiring.	▌Alex D. Bosley (Republican); ▌Deborah K. Stiles (Democratic)
86th	R+57.4	Bryan Ward	Republican	2020	Incumbent retiring.	▌Betsy Orndoff-Sayers (Democratic); ▌Steven Schetrom (Republican)
87th	R+56.9	Gary Howell	Republican	2010	Incumbent running for re-election.	▌Rebecca Holler (Democratic); ▌Gary Howell (Republican)
88th	R+66	Rick Hillenbrand	Republican	2022	Incumbent running for re-election.	▌Rick Hillenbrand (Republican); ▌Dorothy L. Kengla (Democratic)
89th	R+59.2	David Cannon	Republican	2025 (appt.)	Incumbent running for re-election.	▌David Cannon (Republican); ▌J R Hepworth (Democratic); ▌Walter Long (Constitution)
90th	R+54.5	George Miller	Republican	2020	Incumbent running for re-election.	▌Ashley Braner (Democratic); ▌George Miller (Republican)
91st	R+47.9	Ian Masters	Republican	2025 (appt.)	Incumbent retiring.	▌Chris Clagett (Republican); ▌David Michaels (Democratic)
92nd	R+38.4	Michael Hite	Republican	2022	Incumbent running for re-election.	▌Michael Hite (Republican); ▌Brad Noll (Democratic)
93rd	R+19.7	Michael Hornby	Republican	2022	Incumbent running for re-election.	▌Michael Hornby (Republican); ▌Tara McCoy (Constitution)
94th	R+33.9	Donald Bennett	Republican	2026 (appt.)	Incumbent running for re-election.	▌Donald Bennett (Republican); ▌Elizabeth Sanchez (Democratic)
95th	R+35.8	Chuck Horst	Republican	2020	Incumbent running for re-election.	▌Chuck Horst (Republican); ▌Kara Waldeck (Democratic); ▌Daniel Walls (Constitution)
96th	R+37.9	Lisa White	Republican	2024	Incumbent retiring.	▌Lisa Cathro (Democratic); ▌Becky Durnmire (Constitution); ▌Katie Rose (Republican)
97th	R+16.7	S. Chris Anders	Republican	2024	Incumbent running for re-election.	▌S. Chris Anders (Republican); ▌Lucia Valentine (Democratic)
98th	R+30.1	Joe Funkhouser	Republican	2024 (appt.)	Incumbent running for re-election.	▌Marta Beck (Democratic); ▌Joe Funkhouser (Republican)
99th	R+13.8	Wayne Clark	Republican	2020	Incumbent running for re-election.	▌Wayne Clark (Republican); ▌Regina Dyer (Democratic)
100th	R+9.9	William Ridenour	Republican	2022	Incumbent running for re-election.	▌William Ridenour (Republican); ▌Jenny Thacker (Democratic)

== Primary election results ==
Primary results below are unofficial, and reflect how they appeared on the West Virginia Secretary of State's Web site on the evening of May 13, 2026, with all counties fully reported. Particularly close races may be subject to recounts.

=== Republican primaries ===
==== Contested primaries ====
District	Nominee			Runners-up						Total		
District	Candidate	Votes	%	Candidate	Votes	%	Candidate	Votes	%	Votes	Maj.	Mrg.
2nd	Tony Viola	628	57.35%	Mark Zatezalo (incumbent)	467	42.65%	—			1,095	+161	+14.70%
4th	Derek Ennis	869	57.47%	Dolph Santorine	643	42.53%	—			1,512	+226	+14.94%
5th	Beth Hinebaugh	430	53.75%	Riley Watkins	370	46.25%	—			800	+60	+7.50%
6th	Don DeWitt	912	64.68%	Jeffrey Stephens (incumbent)	498	35.32%	—			1,410	+414	+29.36%
8th	Steven Smith	1,240	56.70%	Bill Bell (incumbent)	947	43.30%	—			2,187	+293	+13.40%
9th	Kerry Murphy	698	29.87%	Scott McGraw	447	19.13%	inc. + 3 others (Note: Betsy Kelly (incumbent): 352 votes, 15.06%; Mark Kimball: 288 votes, 12.32%; Dan Boley: 278 votes, 11.90%; Steve Thomas: 274 votes, 11.72%)	1,192	51.00%	2,337	+251	+10.74%
10th	Justin Beanard	829	50.09%	Bill Anderson (incumbent)	826	49.91%	—			1,655	+3	+0.18%
11th	Jeff S. Sandy	834	51.23%	Andrew Borkowski	794	48.77%	—			1,628	+40	+2.46%
12th	Charles Hartzog	688	61.93%	Vernon Criss (incumbent)	423	38.07%	—			1,111	+265	+23.86%
13th	Melissa McCrady	910	63.06%	Scot Heckert (incumbent)	533	36.94%	—			1,443	+377	+26.12%
14th	Dave Foggin (incumbent)	698	38.35%	Angie Adams	669	36.76%	Andy Daniel	453	24.89%	1,820	+29	+1.59%
17th	Jonathan Pinson (incumbent)	978	62.21%	Scott Cadle	594	37.79%	—			1,572	+384	+24.42%
21st	C. D. Caldwell	806	52.37%	Michael Kidd	733	47.63%	—			1,539	+73	+4.74%
22nd	Aaron Holley	650	50.12%	Daniel Linville (incumbent)	647	49.88%	—			1,297	+3	+0.24%
26th	Matthew Rohrbach (incumbent)	616	61.85%	Andrew G Lowry	380	38.15%	—			996	+236	+23.70%
27th	Tyler Bowen	356	52.12%	William Alex T. Caudill	327	47.88%	—			683	+29	+4.24%
28th	Ryan Browning (incumbent)	698	58.26%	Mark Caserta	500	41.74%	—			1,198	+198	+16.52%
30th	Jeff Eldridge (incumbent)	442	51.22%	David 'Flimsy' Adkins	421	48.78%	—			863	+21	+2.44%
33rd	Chris Tipton	610	52.14%	Jordan Bridges (incumbent)	560	47.86%	—			1,170	+50	+4.28%
34th	Barry C. Marcum	322	36.38%	Braydan Rodney Goff	284	32.09%	2 others (Note: John W. White: 207 votes, 23.39%; James 'Tige' Harless: 72 votes, 8.14%)	279	31.53%	885	+38	+4.29%
35th	John Morgan	641	59.52%	Gregory Bishop	436	40.48%	—			1,077	+205	+19.04%
36th	David Green (incumbent)	345	80.99%	S.P. 'Pat' Mckinney	81	19.01%	—			426	+264	+61.98%
39th	Samuel Lusk	793	59.22%	Thurman Scott Dickerson	546	40.78%	—			1,339	+247	+18.44%
40th	Roy Cooper (incumbent)	1,001	62.60%	Jon Fain	300	18.76%	Travis G. Waldron	298	18.64%	1,599	+701	+43.84%
41st	Jordan Maynor (incumbent)	1,204	70.91%	Adrian B. Carag	494	29.09%	—			1,698	+710	+41.82%
42nd	John Jordan (incumbent)	737	58.35%	Richard 'Rick' Jones	526	41.65%	—			1,263	+211	+16.70%
46th	Jeff Campbell (incumbent)	1,258	75.28%	Mark Alan Robinson	413	24.72%	—			1,671	+845	+50.56%
47th	Ray Canterbury (incumbent)	1,179	68.71%	Mary Catherine Tuckwiller	537	31.29%	—			1,716	+642	+37.42%
48th	Mackenzie Holdren	514	53.37%	Gregory Watt (incumbent)	449	46.63%	—			963	+65	+6.74%
49th	Newt McCutcheon	795	60.05%	Stanley Adkins (incumbent)	529	39.95%	—			1,324	+266	+20.10%
51st	Cy Persinger	659	45.89%	Dan Hill	390	27.16%	Marshall Clay (incumbent)	387	26.95%	1,436	+269	+18.73%
53rd	Tristan Leavitt (incumbent)	664	68.52%	Terry J Burns	305	31.48%	—			969	+359	+37.04%
61st	Dean Jeffries (incumbent)	1,107	79.41%	Lewis A. Taylor	287	20.59%	—			1,394	+820	+58.82%
63rd	Lori Dittman (incumbent)	992	74.92%	Wesley A. Self	332	25.08%	—			1,324	+660	+49.84%
68th	Chris Phillips (incumbent)	1,107	73.17%	David Critchfield	295	19.50%	Tyler S. Williams	111	7.34%	1,513	+812	+53.67%
69th	Danny Hamrick	572	43.80%	Keith Marple (incumbent)	544	41.65%	Andrew Yost	190	14.55%	1,306	+28	+2.15%
70th	Paul J. Howe III	402	51.15%	Salvatore M. Bombardiere	384	48.85%	—			786	+18	+2.30%
71st	Tim McNeely	688	50.22%	Laura Kimble (incumbent)	682	49.78%	—			1,370	+6	+0.44%
72nd	Clay Riley (incumbent)	736	69.83%	Megan M. Krajewski	318	30.17%	—			1,054	+418	+39.66%
73rd	Frank Sturm	720	50.92%	Rob Gallo	694	49.08%	—			1,414	+26	+1.84%
74th	Guy Ward (incumbent)	525	48.70%	Scott Crouch	509	47.22%	Jonathan Woertz	44	4.08%	1,078	+16	+1.48%
78th	Geno Chiarelli (incumbent)	566	64.32%	Cohen Terneus	314	35.68%	—			880	+252	+28.64%
85th	Alex D. Bosley	843	42.02%	Jerry Ours	696	34.70%	Bruce A. Kolsun	467	23.28%	2,006	+147	+7.32%
87th	Gary Howell (incumbent)	760	53.63%	Charles 'Dutch' Staggs	657	46.37%	—			1,417	+103	+7.26%
90th	George Miller (incumbent)	767	38.62%	Kevin T. McLaughlin	535	26.94%	2 others (Note: Dan Caldwell: 368 votes, 18.53%; Davy Jones: 316 votes, 15.91%)	684	34.44%	1,986	+232	+11.68%
99th	Wayne Clark (incumbent)	522	64.52%	Robert Fluharty	287	35.48%	—			809	+235	+29.04%

==== Nominated without opposition ====
The following candidates did not see any competition in the Republican primary election:

- District 1: incumbent Pat McGeehan received 1,552 votes.
- District 3: incumbent Jimmy Willis received 801 votes.
- District 7: incumbent Charles Sheedy received 957 votes.
- District 15: incumbent Erica Moore received 1,430 votes.
- District 16: incumbent Happy Joe Parsons received 1,774 votes.
- District 18: incumbent Jim Butler received 1,029 votes.
- District 19: incumbent Kathie Hess Crouse received 1,059 votes.
- District 20: incumbent Sarah Drennan received 1,549 votes.
- District 23: incumbent Evan Worrell received 874 votes.
- District 24: incumbent Patrick Lucas received 567 votes.
- District 29: incumbent Henry Dillon received 608 votes.
- District 31: incumbent Margitta Mazzocchi received 601 votes.
- District 32: incumbent Josh Holstein received 838 votes.
- District 37: incumbent Marty Gearheart received 813 votes.
- District 38: incumbent Joe Ellington received 1,010 votes.
- District 43: incumbent Chris Toney received 966 votes.
- District 44: incumbent Bill Roop received 892 votes.
- District 45: incumbent Eric Brooks received 804 votes.
- District 50: incumbent Elliott Pritt received 785 votes.
- District 52: incumbent Tresa Howell received 664 votes.
- District 55: incumbent JB Akers received 1,215 votes.
- District 58: incumbent Walter Hall received 895 votes.
- District 59: incumbent Andy Shamblin Andy Shamblin received 800 votes.
- District 60: incumbent Dana Ferrell received 960 votes.
- District 62: incumbent Roger Hanshaw Roger Hanshaw received 941 votes.
- District 64: incumbent Adam Burkhammer received 1,153 votes.
- District 65: incumbent Carl Martin received 1,432 votes.
- District 66: incumbent Jonathan Kyle received 1,056 votes.
- District 67: Les Mallow received 958 votes.
- District 75: incumbent Phil Mallow received 761 votes.
- District 76: Jon Dodds received 590 votes.
- District 77: incumbent Joe Statler received 874 votes.
- District 82: incumbent David McCormick received 666 votes.
- District 83: incumbent George Street received 1,159 votes.
- District 84: incumbent D. Rolland Jennings received 1,572 votes.
- District 86: Steven Schetrom received 1,162 votes.
- District 88: incumbent Rick Hillenbrand received 1,254 votes.
- District 89: incumbent David Cannon received 1,332 votes.
- District 91: Chris Clagett received 796 votes.
- District 92: incumbent Michael Hite received 956 votes.
- District 93: incumbent Michael Hornby received 652 votes.
- District 95: incumbent Chuck Horst received 664 votes.
- District 96: Katie Rose received 637 votes.
- District 97: incumbent S. Chris Anders received 752 votes.
- District 98: incumbent Joe Funkhouser received 686 votes.
- District 100: incumbent William Ridenour received 824 votes.

==== Primaries with no qualified candidates ====
The following districts did not see any candidate qualify for the Republican primary election:

- District 25
- District 54
- District 56
- District 57
- District 79
- District 80
- District 81

==== Nomination not made by primary ====
On February 28, 2026, District 94 delegate Larry Kump, the only candidate running for that seat's nomination, died after the primary filing deadline. Governor Patrick Morrisey appointed Donald Bennett to fill the seat, he will appear on the general election ballot as the Republican nominee.

=== Democratic primaries ===
==== Contested primaries ====
District	Nominee			Runners-up						Total		
District	Candidate	Votes	%	Candidate	Votes	%	Candidate	Votes	%	Votes	Maj.	Mrg.
14th	Crystal Butcher	310	46.20%	Jim Marion	275	40.98%	Jonathan White	86	12.82%	671	+35	+5.22%
31st	George C. Barker	642	82.63%	Derrick Pearson	135	17.37%	—			777	+507	+65.26%
33rd	Michael B. (Mickey) Browning	415	60.06%	Brittany Feury	276	39.94%	—			691	+139	+20.12%
39th	Brianna A Pearcy	343	61.03%	Neal Vestal	219	38.97%	—			562	+124	+22.06%
44th	Christina Baisden	608	55.22%	Tristin Kinningham	493	44.78%	—			1,101	+115	+10.44%
47th	Sarah Morris	664	69.97%	Mark E. Phipps Jr.	285	30.03%	—			949	+379	+39.94%
52nd	Joyce Brown	509	39.64%	Michelle Harper	494	38.47%	Seth Adkins	281	21.88%	1,284	+15	+1.17%
53rd	Keena Mullins	686	64.53%	Howard Mize	377	35.47%	—			1,063	+309	+29.06%
55th	Anthony Dasaro	1,082	67.50%	Aaron Crank	521	32.50%	—			1,603	+561	+35.00%
58th	Marisa Jackson	1,009	75.52%	Alaina Schwechler	327	24.48%	—			1336	+682	+51.04%
61st	Sue Crawford	428	56.99%	Shane Woodrum	323	43.01%	—			751	+105	+13.98%
63rd	Kevin Westley Carpenter	863	62.18%	Betsy Coulter	525	37.82%	—			1,388	+338	+24.36%
69th	Jocelyn Blackwell	514	60.26%	Lou Assaro	339	39.74%	—			853	+175	+20.52%
70th	Shannon Welsh	756	53.02%	Jackson Howe	670	46.98%	—			1,426	+86	+6.04%
80th	Olivia Miller	957	69.75%	Kirsten Nelson	415	30.25%	—			1,372	+542	+39.50%
82nd	Eddie Wagoner	673	55.85%	Thomas Ramsey	532	44.15%	—			1,205	+141	+11.70%
85th	Deborah K. Stiles	480	70.07%	Dean Bonney	205	29.93%	—			685	+275	+40.14%
89th	J R Hepworth	405	63.68%	John R. Zupan	231	36.32%	—			636	+174	+27.36%
99th	Regina Dyer	596	65.21%	Robert M. Vincent	318	34.79%	—			914	+278	+30.42%

==== Nominated without opposition ====
The following candidates did not see any competition in the Democratic primary election:

- District 1: Quincy Wilson received 780 votes.
- District 2: Daniel Joseph Day received 833 votes.
- District 3: Mike Robinson received 783 votes.
- District 4: Joe Jividen received 1,035 votes.
- District 5: Karen Shuler Stakem received 1,181 votes.
- District 6: Cody Cumpston received 1,273 votes.
- District 7: Sarah Reggi received 807 votes.
- District 10: Christopher Jones received 754 votes.
- District 11: Daniel Miller received 957 votes.
- District 12: Dennis V. Rempel received 781 votes.
- District 13: Marley Umensetter received 626 votes.
- District 16: Jason M. Barr received 731 votes.
- District 17: Kathryn 'Kat' Weiland received 845 votes.
- District 18: Jonathan Hersman received 659 votes.
- District 19: Nolan Rose received 721 votes.
- District 20: Tonya Patrick Shuler received 726 votes.
- District 21: Michael G. Mosteller Ii received 784 votes.
- District 23: Amanda Beth Beach-Burge received 608 votes.
- District 24: Steve Williams received 879 votes.
- District 25: incumbent Sean Hornbuckle received 1,210 votes.
- District 27: Ric Griffith received 844 votes.
- District 28: Brooke Smith received 895 votes.
- District 29: Wendy Coleman received 493 votes.
- District 30: Ryan Cledith Elkins received 566 votes.
- District 32: Jennifer Bias Bryant received 1,320 votes.
- District 34: Tara 'Babyt' Sexton received 415 votes.
- District 35: Rachael Hawkins-Church received 607 votes.
- District 36: Katelynn Jordan received 515 votes.
- District 37: Treyvon Simmons received 635 votes.
- District 38: Randa D Faulkner received 559 votes.
- District 40: Jennifer Gilkerson received 785 votes.
- District 41: Curtis Shaver received 597 votes.
- District 42: Courtney Vandall received 491 votes.
- District 45: Joseph Golden received 563 votes.
- District 46: Sarah Umberger received 975 votes.
- District 48: Jourdan Deitz received 705 votes.
- District 49: Byron Tucker Jr. received 662 votes.
- District 50: Mathew Anderson received 858 votes.
- District 51: Colby A. Lopez received 1,012 votes.
- District 54: incumbent Mike Pushkin received 2,089 votes.
- District 56: incumbent Kayla Young received 1,604 votes.
- District 57: incumbent Hollis Lewis received 1,550 votes.
- District 59: Howard 'Cookie' Claytor Iii received 828 votes.
- District 60: Lynette Shaw received 643 votes.
- District 62: Samantha Tanner-Lester received 817 votes.
- District 65: Mira Tanner-Hughes received 586 votes.
- District 66: Danielle M. Dougherty received 930 votes.
- District 67: Mandy Weirich received 1,153 votes.
- District 71: Robert 'Rob' Garcia received 1,217 votes.
- District 73: Kit (Kathleen) Ford received 823 votes.
- District 74: Frankie Delapas received 1,069 votes.
- District 75: Linda Longstreth received 1,397 votes.
- District 76: incumbent Rick Garcia received 1,305 votes.
- District 77: Patricia Andrea Bunner received 938 votes.
- District 78: Michael Wendell received 1,164 votes.
- District 79: incumbent Evan Hansen received 1,481 votes.
- District 81: incumbent Anitra Hamilton received 722 votes.
- District 84: Colin Savage received 730 votes.
- District 86: Betsy Orndoff-Sayers received 880 votes.
- District 87: Rebecca Holler received 507 votes.
- District 88: Dorothy L. Kengla received 477 votes.
- District 90: Ashley Braner received 579 votes.
- District 91: David Michaels received 435 votes.
- District 92: Brad Noll received 684 votes.
- District 94: Elizabeth Sanchez received 520 votes.
- District 95: Kara Waldeck received 478 votes.
- District 96: Lisa Cathro received 509 votes.
- District 97: Lucia Valentine received 988 votes.
- District 98: Marta Beck received 589 votes.
- District 100: Jenny Thacker received 1,008 votes.

==== Primaries with no qualified candidates ====
The following districts did not see any candidate qualify for the Democratic primary election:

- District 8
- District 9
- District 15
- District 22
- District 26
- District 43
- District 64
- District 68
- District 72
- District 83
- District 93

== Detailed results ==
=== District 1 ===
The first House district is located within the state's Northern Panhandle, representing portions of the counties of Hancock and Brooke. Communities within the district include much of eastern Weirton, along with Chester, New Cumberland, and Newell.

The incumbent for this seat is Pat McGeehan, a Republican, first elected in 2008. He was re-elected in 2024 unopposed, and is running for re-election. Republican nominee Donald Trump won this district with 76.0 percent of the vote at the 2024 presidential election.

District 1 general election
Party	Candidate	Votes	%
Republican	Pat McGeehan (incumbent)		
Democratic	Quincy Wilson		
Total votes			

=== District 2 ===
The second House district is based in the city of Weirton, located within the state's Northern Panhandle. Represented by the district are portions of the counties of Hancock and Brooke.

The incumbent for this seat is Mark Zatezalo, a Republican, first elected in 2014. He was re-elected in 2024 with 68.2 percent of the vote and is running for re-election. Republican nominee Donald Trump won this district with 68.5 percent of the vote at the 2024 presidential election. Tony Viola, a businessman, challenged him in the Republican primary.

District 2 Republican primary
Party	Candidate	Votes	%
Republican	Tony Viola	628	57.35%
Republican	Mark Zatezalo (incumbent)	467	42.65%

District 2 general election
Party	Candidate	Votes	%
Republican	Tony Viola		
Democratic	Daniel Joseph Day		
Total votes			

=== District 3 ===
The third House district is located within the state's Northern Panhandle. Represented by the district are portions of the counties of Brooke and Ohio. The largest municipality in the district is Follansbee, other communities within the include Hooverson Heights, Wellsburg, and West Liberty.

The incumbent for this seat is Jimmy Willis, a Republican, first elected in 2022. He was re-elected in 2024 with 68.8 percent of the vote and is running for re-election. Republican nominee Donald Trump won this district with 70.9 percent of the vote at the 2024 presidential election.

District 3 general election
Party	Candidate	Votes	%
Independent	Dave Cantrell		
Democratic	Mike Robinson		
Republican	Jimmy Willis (incumbent)		
Total votes			

=== District 4 ===
The fourth House district is located within the state's Northern Panhandle, representing a portion of Ohio County. It contains much of eastern Wheeling, and also contains the city of Bethlehem.

The incumbent for this seat is Bill Flanigan, a Republican, first elected in 2024 after unseating a Republican incumbent. He had previously represented the 51st district in 2016. Flanigan is retiring to run for Supreme Court of Appeals. Republican nominee Donald Trump won this district with 65.7 percent of the vote at the 2024 presidential election.

District 4 Republican primary
Party	Candidate	Votes	%
Republican	Derek Ennis	869	57.47%
Republican	Dolph Santorine	643	42.53%

District 4 general election
Party	Candidate	Votes	%
Republican	Derek Ennis		
Democratic	Joe Jividen		
Total votes			

=== District 5 ===
The fifth House district is based in the city of Wheeling within the state's Northern Panhandle, representing a portion of Ohio County.

The incumbent for this seat is minority whip Shawn Fluharty, a Democrat, first elected in 2014. He was re-elected in 2024 with 57.2 percent of the vote and is retiring to run for state Senate. Republican nominee Donald Trump won this district with 55.2 percent of the vote at the 2024 presidential election.

District 5 Republican primary
Party	Candidate	Votes	%
Republican	Beth Hinebaugh	430	53.75%
Republican	Riley Watkins	370	46.25%

District 5 general election
Party	Candidate	Votes	%
Democratic	Karen Shuler Stakem		
Republican	Beth Hinebaugh		
Total votes			

=== District 6 ===
Republican Jeffrey Stephens was re-elected in 2024 with 56.12 percent of the vote. He is seeking re-election.

==== Filed ====
- Jeffrey Stephens, incumbent delegate since 2023
- Don DeWitt

=== District 7 ===
Republican Charles Sheedy was re-elected in 2024 with 67.76 percent of the vote. He is seeking re-election.

- Sarah Reggi

=== District 8 ===
Republican David Kelly was re-elected in 2024 unopposed. He resigned from the House on June 15, 2025, and Bill Bell was appointed to take his place. Bell is seeking re-election.

==== Filed ====
- Timothy Bassett
- Bill Bell, incumbent delegate since 2025

=== District 9 ===
==== Filed ====
- Betsy J. Kelly
- Scott McGraw
- Kerry G. Murphy
- Steve Thomas

=== District 10 ===
==== Filed ====
- Bill Anderson
- Justin Beanard

=== District 11 ===
Republican Bob Fehrenbacher was re-elected in 2024 unopposed.

==== Filed ====
- Jeffrey Sandy, former sheriff of Wood County and former West Virginia Homeland Security Secretary (Note: Served in these posts as a Democrat, then as an independent.)
- Andrew Borkowski

=== District 12 ===
Republican Vernon Criss was re-elected in 2024 unopposed. He is seeking re-election.

==== Filed ====
- Vernon Criss, incumbent delegate since 2016
- Charles D. Hartzog

=== District 13 ===
Republican Scot Heckert was re-elected in 2024 unopposed. He is seeking re-election.

==== Filed ====
- Scot Heckert, incumbent delegate since 2022

=== District 14 ===
Republican Dave Foggin was re-elected in 2024 with 76.52 percent of the vote.

==== Filed ====
- Dave Foggin, incumbent
- Angela Adams
- Andrew Daniel

=== District 15 ===
Republican Erica Moore was re-elected in 2024 with 82.04 percent of the vote. She is seeking re-election.

=== District 17 ===
Republican Jonathan Pinson was re-elected in 2024 unopposed.

==== Filed ====
- Jonathan Pinson, incumbent
- Scott Cadle

=== District 18 ===
Republican Jim Butler was re-elected in 2024 with 71.71 percent of the vote. He is seeking re-election.

=== District 19 ===
Republican Kathie Hess Crouse was re-elected in 2024 unopposed. She is seeking re-election.

=== District 20 ===
Republican Sarah Drennan was elected in 2024 with 71.63% percent of the vote. She is seeking re-election.

=== District 21 ===
Republican Jarred Cannon was re-elected in 2024 with 68.99 percent of the vote.

==== Filed ====
- Carl Dean Caldwell II
- Michael Kidd

=== District 22 ===
Republican Daniel Linville was re-elected in 2024 unopposed, but he was challenged in that year's Republican primary, winning 51 percent of the vote against Aaron Holley, a 46-vote margin. He is seeking re-election.

==== Filed ====
- Daniel Linville, incumbent delegate since 2018
- Aaron Holley, primary candidate for this district in 2024

=== District 23 ===
Republican Daniel Linville was re-elected in 2024 with 75.55 percent of the vote. He is seeking re-election.

=== District 24 ===
Republican Patrick Lucas was re-elected in 2024 with 57.13 percent of the vote. He is seeking re-election.

=== District 25 ===
Democrat Sean Hornbuckle was re-elected in 2024 with 74.35 percent of the vote. He is seeking re-election.

=== District 26 ===
Republican Daniel Linville was re-elected in 2024 unopposed. He is seeking re-election.

==== Filed ====
- Matthew Rohrbach, incumbent delegate since 2014
- Andrew Garrett Lowry

=== District 27 ===
Republican Michael Amos was elected in 2024 with 63.91 percent of the vote.

==== Filed ====
- William Caudill
- Tyler Bowen
- Gordon Ramey II

=== District 28 ===
Republican Ryan Browning was re-elected in 2024 with 98.16 percent of the vote. He is seeking re-election.

==== Filed ====
- Ryan Browning, incumbent delegate since 2024
- Mark Allen Caserta

=== District 29 ===
Republican Henry Dillon was re-elected in 2024 with 60.78 percent of the vote. He is seeking re-election.

=== District 30 ===
Republican Jeff Eldridge was elected in 2024 with 72.22 percent of the vote after defeating incumbent delegate David Adkins in the Republican primary.

==== Filed ====
- Jeff Elbridge, incumbent
- David "Flimsy" Adkins

=== District 31 ===
==== Filed ====
- George C. Barker
- Derrick Pearson

=== District 33 ===
==== Filed ====
- Jordan Bridges
- Chris Tipton

==== Filed ====
- Brittany Feury
- Michael Browning

=== District 34 ===
Republican Mark Dean was re-elected in 2024 unopposed.

==== Filed ====
- Braydan Goff
- James "Tige" Harless
- Barry C. Marcum
- John W. White

=== District 35 ===
Republican Adam Vance was re-elected in 2024 unopposed.

==== Filed ====
- Gregory A. Bishop, former prosecuting attorney of Wyoming County
- John Howard Morgan

=== District 36 ===
Republican David Green was re-elected in 2024 with 74.09 percent of the vote. He is seeking re-election.

==== Filed ====
- David Green, incumbent delegate since 2024
- S.P. "Pat" McKinney

=== District 37 ===
Republican Marty Gearheart was 73.85 re-elected in 2024 with percent of the vote.

=== District 38 ===
Republican Joe Ellington was re-elected in 2024 with 75.23 percent of the vote. He is seeking re-election.

=== District 39 ===
Republican Doug Smith was re-elected in 2024 with 81.22 percent of the vote. He declined to run for re-election

==== Filed ====
- Thurman Dickerson
- Carla Oakley
- Samuel Lusk

==== Endorsements ====
Samuel Lusk

Politicians

- Doug Smith, incumbent delegate since 2020

==== Filed ====
- Brianna A. Pearcy
- Neal Vestal

=== District 40 ===
Republican Roy Cooper was re-elected in 2024 with 72.79 percent of the vote. He is seeking re-election.

==== Filed ====
- Roy Cooper, incumbent delegate since 2013
- Jon Fain
- Travis G. Waldron

=== District 41 ===
Republican Jordan Maynor was re-elected in 2024 with 79.01 percent of the vote. He is seeking re-election.

==== Filed ====
- Jordan Maynor, incumbent delegate since 2021
- Adrian B. Carag

=== District 42 ===
Republican delegate Brandon Steele, who was re-elected in 2024, announced his resignation effective December 18, 2025, and is not seeking re-election in 2026. On January 13, 2026, governor Patrick Morrisey announced the appointment of Beckley pastor John K. Jordan to serve the remainder of Steele's term. On January 14, 2026, Delegate Jordan filed to run for the seat in the 2026 election.

==== Filed ====
- John K. Jordan, incumbent delegate since 2026
- Richard D. Jones, judge

=== District 43 ===
Republican Chris Toney was re-elected in 2024 unopposed. He is seeking re-election.

=== District 44 ===
Republican Bill Roop was re-elected in 2024 with 57.11 percent of the vote. He is seeking re-election.

==== Filed ====
- Christina Baisden
- Tristin Kinningham

=== District 45 ===
Republican Eric Brooks was re-elected in 2024 unopposed. He is seeking re-election.

=== District 46 ===
Republican Jeff Campbell was re-elected in 2024 with 71.13 percent of the vote. He is seeking re-election.

==== Filed ====
- Jeff Campbell, incumbent delegate since 2023
- Mark Alan Robinson

=== District 47 ===
Republican Ray Canterbury was elected in 2024 with 71.42 percent of the vote.

=== Republican primary ===
==== Filed ====
- Ray Canterbury, incumbent delegate

==== Filed ====
- Mark E. Phipps Jr
- Sarah Morris
Mark Phipps Jr

Organizations

- Vote Common Good

=== Libertarian primary ===
==== Filed ====
- Maria Jenkins

=== District 48 ===
Republican Gregory Watt was appointed to this seat on October 3, 2025. Watt succeeded resigning Republican incumbent Tom Clark, who was re-elected in 2024 with 75.44 percent of the vote. Watt is running for re-election.

==== Filed ====
- Gregory Watt, incumbent delegate since 2025
- Mackenzie Holdren

=== District 49 ===
==== Filed ====
- Stanley S. Adkins

=== District 50 ===
Republican Elliott Pritt was re-elected in 2024 with 66.42 percent of the vote. He originally sought re-election, but he withdrew from the race on August 4, after the Republican primary and the deadline to replace him, leaving the race with no Republican on the general election ballot. Matthew Anderson, an elementary school teacher, is the Democratic candidate to replace him. Three candidates, including appointed Republican delegate Bill Vest, are also running as write-in candidates.

District 50 general election
Party	Candidate	Votes	%
Democratic	Mathew Anderson		
Constitution	Stacey L. Hensley		
Independent	Tom Louisos		
Write-in	J. Pino		
Write-in	Bill Vest (incumbent)		
Write-in	Eric Walton		
Total votes			

=== District 51 ===
Republican Marshall Clay was elected in 2024 with 67.08 percent of the vote. He is seeking re-election.

==== Filed ====
- Marshall Clay, incumbent delegate since 2024
- Dan Hill
- Cy Persinger

=== District 52 ===
Republican Tresa Howell was elected in 2024 with 60.28 percent of the vote. She is seeking re-election.

==== Filed ====
- Seth Adkins
- Joyce Brown
- Michelle Harper

=== Mountain primary ===
==== Filed ====
- Michael Sigmon

=== District 53 ===
Republican Tristan Leavitt was elected in 2024 with 59.89 percent of the vote.

==== Filed ====
- Tristan Leavitt, incumbent delegate
- Terry Joe Burns

==== Filed ====
- Keena Mullins
- Howard Mize

=== District 54 ===
Democrat Mike Pushkin was elected in 2024 with 74.89 percent of the vote.

=== Unaffiliated candidates ===
==== Filed ====
- Tara Nicole Martinez (NPA)

=== District 55 ===
Republican JB Akers was re-elected in 2024 with 59.75 percent of the vote. He is seeking re-election.

==== Filed ====
- Aaron Crank
- Anthony Dasaro

=== District 57 ===
Democrat Hollis Lewis was elected in 2024 with 54.93 percent of the vote. He is seeking re-election.

=== District 58 ===
Republican Walter Hall was re-elected in 2024 unopposed. He is seeking re-election.

==== Filed ====
- Marisa Jackson
- Alaina Schwechler

==== Withdrawn ====
- Susan Diane Morgan

=== District 59 ===
Republican Andy Shamblin was re-elected in 2024 unopposed. He is seeking re-election.

=== District 60 ===
Republican Dana Ferrell was re-elected in 2024 unopposed. She is seeking re-election.

=== District 61 ===
Republican Dean Jeffries was re-elected in 2024 unopposed. He is seeking re-election.

==== Filed ====
- Dean Jeffries, incumbent delegate since 2018
- Lewis A. Taylor, nominee for the 40th delegate district in 2016

==== Filed ====
- Dorothy Burcham
- Shane Woodrum
- Sue Crawford

==== Withdrawn ====
- Dorothy Elizabeth Sayre Burcham

=== District 62 ===
Republican Roger Hanshaw was re-elected in 2024 unopposed.

=== District 63 ===
Republican Lori Dittman was re-elected in 2024 unopposed. She is seeking re-election.

==== Filed ====
- Lori Dittman, incumbent delegate since 2022
- Wesley Andrew Self

==== Filed ====
- Kevin Westley Carpenter
- Betsy Coulter

=== District 64 ===
Republican Adam Burkhammer was re-elected in 2024 unopposed. He is seeking re-election.

=== District 66 ===
Republican Jonathan Kyle was elected in 2024 with 70.26 percent of the vote. He is seeking re-election.

=== District 67 ===
Republican Elias Coop-Gonzalez was re-elected in 2024 with 54.54 percent of the vote.

=== District 68 ===
Republican Chris Phillips was re-elected in 2024 unopposed. He is seeking re-election.

==== Filed ====
- Chris Phillips, incumbent delegate since 2019
- David Critchfield
- Tyler S. Williams

=== District 69 ===
Republican Keith Marple was re-elected in 2024 unopposed.

=== Republican primary ===
==== Filed ====
- Keith Marple, incumbent
- Andrew Byron Yost
- Danny Hamrick

==== Filed ====
- Lou Assaro
- Jocelyn Blackwell

=== District 70 ===
Republican Mickey Petitto was re-elected in 2024 with 56.16 percent of the vote. She is seeking re-election.

==== Filed ====
- Salvatore M. Bombardiere
- Paul J. Howe III

==== Withdrawn ====
- Mickey Petitto, incumbent delegate since 2022

==== Filed ====
- Jackson Howe
- Shannon Welsh, nominee for this district in 2024

==== Withdrawn ====
- Joseph Rock Romano

=== District 71 ===
Republican Laura Kimble was re-elected in 2024 unopposed.

==== Filed ====
- Laura Kimble, incumbent
- Timothy McNeely

=== District 72 ===
==== Filed ====
- Clay Riley, incumbent
- Megan M. Krajewski

=== District 73 ===
Republican Bryan Smith was re-elected in 2024 unopposed. He is not seeking re-election.

==== Filed ====
- Rob Gallo
- Frank Strum

=== District 74 ===
Republican Mike DeVault was re-elected in 2024 with 72.05 percent of the vote. Former delegate Guy Ward is seeking to regain this seat after losing it to DeVault at the Republican primary in 2022.

==== Filed ====
- Guy Ward, this district's delegate from 2020 to 2022
- Jonathan Woertz
- Matthew Offutt
- Scott Crouch

=== District 75 ===
Republican Phil Mallow was re-elected in 2024 with 55.66 percent of the vote. He is running for re-election.

=== District 76 ===
Democrat Rick Garcia was elected in 2024 with 50.97 percent of the vote.

=== District 77 ===
Republican Joe Statler was re-elected in 2024 unopposed. He is seeking re-election.

=== District 78 ===
Republican Geno Chiarelli was re-elected in 2024 with 55.68 percent of the vote. He is seeking re-election.

==== Filed ====
- Geno Chiarelli, incumbent delegate since 2022
- Cohen Scott Terneus
- Sawyer Dennison

=== District 80 ===
Democrat John Williams was re-elected in 2024 with 58.76 percent of the vote.

==== Filed ====
- Olivia Hope Miller
- Kirsten Nelson

=== District 81 ===
Democrat Anitra Hamilton was re-elected in 2024 unopposed. She is seeking re-election.

=== District 82 ===
Republican Dave McCormick was elected in 2024 with 53.94 percent of the vote. He is seeking re-election.

==== Filed ====
- Thomas Ramsey
- Eddie Wagoner

=== District 83 ===
Republican George Street was re-elected in 2024 unopposed. He is seeking re-election.

=== District 84 ===
Republican D. Rolland Jennings was re-elected in 2024 unopposed.

=== District 85 ===
Republican John Paul Hott was re-elected in 2024 unopposed.

==== Filed ====
- Alex Dean Bosley
- Jerry Ours
- Bruce A. Kolsun

==== Potential ====
- John Paul Hott, incumbent delegate since 2018

==== Filed ====
- Deborah K. Stiles

=== District 86 ===
Republican Bryan Ward was re-elected in 2024 unopposed. He is seeking re-election.

=== District 87 ===
Republican Gary Howell was re-elected in 2024 unopposed. He is seeking re-election.

==== Filed ====
- Gary Howell, incumbent delegate since 2010
- Charles "Dutch" Staggs

=== District 89 ===
==== Filed ====
- J. R. Hepworth
- John R. Zupan

=== District 90 ===
Republican George Miller was re-elected in 2024 unopposed.

==== Filed ====
- Daniel Bryan Caldwell
- David Jones
- Kevin T. McLaughlin
- George Miller

=== Mountain primary ===
==== Filed ====
- Joshua Nuckolls

=== District 91 ===
Republican Ian Masters was appointed to this seat on January 23, 2025, to succeed delegate-elect Joseph de Soto, who was elected as a Republican in 2024 with 76.26 percent of the vote.

=== District 92 ===
Republican Michael Hite was re-elected in 2024 unopposed. He is seeking re-election.

=== District 93 ===
Republican Michael Hornby was re-elected in 2024 unopposed. He is seeking re-election.

=== District 94 ===
Republican Larry Kump was re-elected in 2024 unopposed. He initially filed for re-election but died on March 1, 2026.

=== District 95 ===
Republican Chuck Horst was re-elected in 2024 with 67.38 percent of the vote.

=== District 96 ===
Republican Lisa White was elected in 2024 with 71.05 percent of the vote. She is seeking re-election.

=== District 98 ===
Republican Joe Funkhouser was re-elected in 2024 with 65.99 percent of the vote. He is seeking re-election.

=== District 99 ===
Republican Wayne Clark was re-elected in 2024 with 57.97 percent of the vote. He is seeking re-election.

==== Filed ====
- Wayne Clark, incumbent delegate since 2020
- Robert Fluharty

==== Filed ====
- Regina Dyer
- Robert M. Vincent

== See also ==
- Category:2026 elections in West Virginia
- 2026 West Virginia Senate election
