= John Hardy (West Virginia politician) =

American politician

Member of the West Virginia House of Representatives from the 97th district
- In office December 1, 2022 – December 1, 2024
- Succeeded by: S. Chris Anders

Member of the West Virginia House of Representatives from the 63rd district
- Preceded by: Michael Folk
- Succeeded by: Lori Dittman

Personal details
- Born: Martinsburg, West Virginia
- Party: Republican
- Spouse: Sally

John Hardy is an American politician who served as a member of the West Virginia House of Delegates from the 97th district. Elected on November 8, 2022, he assumed office on December 1, 2022 and left office on December 1, 2024. He also served a previous term for the 63rd district in 2018. He served in the army for 6 years.

== Biography ==
Hardy was born and raised in Martinsburg, West Virginia to Bobby and Rosalee Hardy, and graduated from Jefferson High School (West Virginia). He is a Christian.
