= Doug Smith (politician) =

American politician

Member of the West Virginia House of Delegates from the 27th district
- Incumbent
- Assumed office 2020 Serving with Joe Ellington, Marty Gearheart

Personal details
- Born: Douglas D. Smith; January 1, 1967 (age 59) Waterloo, Iowa, U.S.
- Party: Republican
- Education: Wichita State University (BS, MPA); United States Army War College

Military service
- Allegiance: United States
- Branch/service: (United States Army) Army
- Years of service: 1984–2018
- Awards: Bronze Star Medal; Legion of Merit; Meritorious Service Medal

Douglas D. Smith (born January 1, 1967) is an American politician who has served as a Delegate from the 27th District to the West Virginia House of Delegates since 2020. He is a Republican.

== Early life, education, and career ==
Smith was born in Waterloo, Iowa. He received a B.S. in criminal justice at Wichita State University in 1989. In 2006, he received a Master of Public Administration in the same field. Smith graduated from the United States Army War College in 2012. Smith served in the United States Army from 1984 to 2018.

== Elections ==
=== 2020 ===
In his first primary, Smith competed in a five-way race, being nominated alongside two fellow Republicans. Smith received 19.94% of the vote. Incumbent Eric Porterfield finished last, failing to be nominated.

In the general, Smith defeated Democrat Tina Russell with 28.30% of the vote.

== Tenure ==
=== Committee assignments ===
- Education
- Government Organization
- Senior, Children, and Family Issues
- Veterans Affairs and Homeland Security

=== Abortion ===
Smith opposes abortion except in the case of rape or incest. He supports legislation like the Hyde Amendment.

=== COVID-19 Pandemic ===
Smith voted for House Bill 335, which makes it more difficult for businesses to mandate the COVID-19 vaccine for their workers. The law made it easier for workers to use medical or religious exemptions to evade such mandates. However, Smith opposes exemptions from vaccines already mandated in public schools.

=== Crime ===
Smith supports capital punishment. He believes in the use of private prisons but opposes mandatory minimums for non-violent drug offenders. In 2021, when fellow Republican Delegate Derrick Evans was revealed to have participated in the 2021 storming of the United States Capitol, Smith stated that Evans and other rioters be prosecuted and suggested that Evans resign. Evans was arrested the day after Smith made his remarks.

=== Economy ===
Smith supports reducing property taxes. He voted for House Bill 3300, which would significantly reduce the West Virginia income tax. Smith supports reducing government regulations on business, endorsing a "business-friendly environment."

Smith supports an increase in the minimum wage and supports paid family leave. However, he opposes requiring paid medical leave during public health emergencies. During the COVID-19 pandemic, Smith endorsed relief for corporations harmed by the pandemic, like the CARES Act. He supports increased state funding for renewable energy.

Smith penned an op-ed opposing President Joe Biden's climate and social spending package known as the Build Back Better Act. Smith primarily opposed the proposed increase in the corporate tax rate, which he said would harm the economy and West Virginian businesses. The provision was later stripped from the plan.

=== Education ===
Smith was the lead sponsor of House Bill 2012, which increased the allowed number of charter schools in West Virginia from three to ten. The legislation was signed by West Virginia governor Jim Justice in March 2021. Smith also suggested that West Virginia students could receive their education through virtual charter schools as well.

=== Gun rights ===
Smith opposes most forms of gun control, including requiring gun licenses and background checks. He has a "AQ" rating from the NRA Political Victory Fund and was endorsed by them in his 2020 campaign. Smith was the lead sponsor of House Bill 2364, which would allow concealed carry for school staff. He also was the lead sponsor of a bill to permit concealed carry on the grounds of the West Virginia capitol. Neither bill made it to a vote before the full House of Delegates.

=== Transgender rights ===
Smith opposes including sexual orientation and gender identity in anti-discrimination laws. He voted for Senate Bill 341, a bill that would prohibit transgender athletes from competing on the team that aligns with their gender identity.

== Personal life ==
Smith is married to Shirley Smith. He is a Catholic and a member of Veterans of Foreign Wars. He is a recipient of the Legion of Merit, the Bronze Star Medal, and the Meritorious Service Medal, among other awards for his service in the US Army.
