= Michael Amos =

Michael Amos may refer to:

- Michael Amos (politician) (born 1993), American politician
- Michael Amos (swimmer) (1932–2003), New Zealand swimmer
