= Joseph de Soto =

American politician (born 1962/1963)

- Born: Joseph Angel de Soto; 1962 or 1963 (age 62–63); Gerrardstown, West Virginia, U.S.
- Education: La Sierra University (BS); Howard University (MD, PhD)
- Political party: Republican (before 2024); Democratic (2024–present)

Joseph Angel de Soto (born 1962-1963) is an American politician who was the representative-elect for West Virginia's 91st House of Delegates district in 2024. The district is based in Berkeley County. He was arrested on December 12, 2024 for making terroristic threats against members of the West Virginia Legislature. He was never sworn in to his seat and was officially ousted on January 8, 2025.

== Personal life and career ==
De Soto lives in Gerrardstown. As of 2021, he had published over 150 papers. Prior to his race for District 91, he claimed that he was a doctor and a medic for the Rangers. (Note: De Soto claimed that he was a physician and medic for the Army Rangers while on the campaign trail. Multiple news outlets have investigated his credentials and believe that his careers were either fake or embellished, with gaps in his claims. The West Virginia House Republican Caucus had agreed to move forward with expulsion of de Soto over the allegations.) De Soto ran as a Republican in 2024, but switched party affiliation to Democrat on December 11. He is a self-described conservative.

== Arrest and prosecution ==
De Soto was arrested on December 12, 2024 in Martinsburg. He claimed that "Moroni had called on him" to kill members of the West Virginia Legislature. He was released on bond on December 23 and is currently on home confinement. A police report released stated he intended to harm or kill Bill Ridenour, Roger Hanshaw, Pat McGeehan, Michael Hite, Chuck Horst, and Joe Funkhouser. The case is currently awaiting a grand jury.
