= Anita Hall =

American politician

Member of the West Virginia House of Representatives from the 36th district
- In office December 1, 2022 – January 7, 2024
- Preceded by: single member district established
- Succeeded by: David Green

Personal details
- Party: Republican

Anita Hall is an American politician from West Virginia. She is a Republican and represented District 36 in the West Virginia House of Delegates from 2022 to 2024.
