= Ian Masters =

Ian Masters may refer to:

- Ian Masters (journalist), Australian-born American journalist; host of radio programs, Background Briefing, and Live From the Left Coast
- Ian Masters (songwriter) (born 1964), British producer and songwriter; former member of English indie pop band Pale Saints
- Ian Masters (politician) (born 1968), American politician
