= Spring Valley High School (West Virginia) =

Location
- 1 Timberwolf Drive; Huntington, WV 25704; United States; 38.37865°N 82.52725°W

Information
- Type: Public Secondary
- Motto: Learn. Grow. Succeed.
- Established: 1998
- School district: Wayne County
- Superintendent: Todd Alexander
- Principal: John Hayes
- Teaching staff: 61.50 (FTE)
- Grades: 9-12
- Enrollment: 946 (2024–2025)
- Student to teacher ratio: 15.38
- Colors: Carolina blue, silver, navy
- Nickname: Timberwolves
- Website: http://svhs.wayn.k12.wv.us

Spring Valley High School is a high school located in an unincorporated portion of Wayne County, West Virginia, United States, with a postal address in the nearby city of Huntington. It is part of the Wayne County Board of Education system.

== History ==
Spring Valley High School opened due to Buffalo High School, Ceredo-Kenova High School, and Vinson High School consolidating.

== Athletics ==
=== State championships ===
==== Pre-consolidation state championships ====
Listed below are all championships won by Buffalo High School (B), Ceredo-Kenova High School (C), and Vinson High School (V). The three schools were sorted into two different classes for most sports, Ceredo-Kenova High School and Vinson High School being in A, and Buffalo High School in AA.

	State championships
Sport	Year(s)
Baseball	1976 (V), 1986 (V), 1995 (C), 1997 (V)
Boys basketball	1966 (V), 1968 (C), 1969 (C), 1976 (V), 1986 (V), 1995 (V), 1997 (V)
Girls basketball	1993 (B)
Cheer	1997 (C)
Boys cross country
Football	1948 (V), 1950 (V), 1951 (V), 1956 (V), 1957 (V), 1963 (C), 1965 (C), 1967 (C), 1971 (C), 1974 (C), 1975 (C), 1978 (C), 1980 (C), 1981 (C), 1983 (C), 1992 (B), 1994 (C)
Golf	1988 (V), 1991 (V)
Boys track	1967 (C), 1975 (C)

==== Post-consolidation state championships ====
Listed below are all championships Spring Valley High School won after 1998.

	State championships
Sport	Year(s)
Cheer	2010, 2017
Football
Girls Basketball	2025
Golf	2001
Softball	2006
Volleyball	2009, 2011, 2018

== Clubs and organizations ==
=== The bands ===
Spring Valley High School originally had a marching band during the summer/fall and a concert band during the winter/spring with most members participating in each. Additionally, a Jazz Band was held as an after-school club. Including auxiliary members, the band had nearly 200 members. Over time, the school has adjusted the music program, currently with a total of six different bands. The first band is the "Freshman Band", limited to freshmen. The "Symphonic Band" consists mainly of sophomores and juniors. The "Wind Ensemble" consists of juniors, seniors, and a few sophomores. The award-winning "Jazz Ensemble" was chosen to play at the West Virginia State Music Convention, the highest recognition a West Virginia jazz band can receive. In 2008–09, the program developed a Secondary Jazz Band along with a "Non-Marching Band" class. Students who are not in the marching band are required to enter the new class.

Since the school's inception, the "Marching Timberwolves" have won numerous awards in many competitions including their first time on the competition field in Hurricane, WV during the fall of 1998. In fact, the color guard went undefeated in 2010, winning first place at every competition including the biggest one held at Marshall University. Composed of approximately 15% of the school's total enrollment, the band's performances include appearances at the Gator Bowl, Sugar Bowl, Walt Disney World, MGM Studios, James Madison "Parade of Champions", and many amusement parks.

== Notable alumni ==
=== As Spring Valley High School ===
- Michael Amos, West Virginia House of Delegates, from the 27th district
- Adriana Harmeyer, won $351,600 during her 15-day win-streak in June and has qualified three times over for the Tournament of Champions on Jeopardy!
- Whitney Agee Hollman, member of the U.S. National Cheerleading Team and college cheerleading coach
- Wyatt Milum, offensive tackle for the Jacksonville Jaguars of the National Football League (NFL)

=== As Ceredo-Kenova High School ===
- Don Robinson, former MLB 3x Silver Slugger Award winner
- Brad D. Smith, former CEO of Intuit, President of Marshall University
- Michael W. Smith, three-time Grammy Award and multiple Dove Award winner who has charted in both contemporary Christian and mainstream charts; his biggest success in mainstream music was in 1991 when "Place in This World" hit No. 6 on the Billboard Hot 100; has sold more than 18 million albums

=== As Vinson High School ===
- Buzz Nutter, former NFL Pro Bowl center and linebacker for the Baltimore Colts and Pittsburgh Steelers, Virginia Tech sports hall of fame (class of 1985)
