= Steve Westfall =

American politician

Member of the West Virginia House of Delegates
- In office December 1, 2012 – December 1, 2024
- Preceded by: Mitch Carmichael
- Succeeded by: Joe Parsons
- Constituency: 12th district (2020–2022); 16th district (2022–present)

Personal details
- Born: December 16, 1955 (age 70) Gassaway, West Virginia, U.S.
- Party: Republican
- Education: Glenville State College

Steve Westfall (born December 16, 1955) is an American politician who was a Republican member of the West Virginia House of Delegates representing District 12 from January 12, 2013 to December 1, 2024.

== Education ==
Westfall earned his BS in education from Glenville State College.

== Elections ==
- 2012 When incumbent Republican Representative Mitch Carmichael ran for West Virginia Senate and left the seat open, Westfall was unopposed for the May 8, 2012, Republican Primary, winning with 1,590 votes, and won the November 6, 2012, General election, winning with 3,442 votes (49.7%) against Democratic nominee Jo Boggess Phillips (who had run for the seat in 2008 and 2010) and Mountain Party candidate Justin Johnson.
