= Tom Fast =

American politician

Member of the West Virginia House of Delegates from the 51st district
- In office December 1, 2022 – December 1, 2024
- Succeeded by: Marshall Clay

Member of the West Virginia House of Delegates from the 32nd district
- In office December 1, 2014 – December 1, 2022

Personal details
- Born: May 15, 1966 (age 60) Fairmont, West Virginia, U.S.
- Party: Republican
- Spouse: Lisa Fast
- Children: 1
- Education: Regent University (BA, JD)

Tom Fast (born May 15, 1966) is an American attorney and politician who served as a member of the West Virginia House of Delegates from the 32nd district. Elected in November 2014, he assumed office in 2015. He represented the 51st district from 2022 to 2024.

== Early life and education ==
Fast was born in Fairmont, West Virginia in 1966. He earned a Bachelor of Arts degree in political science from Regent University and a Juris Doctor from the Regent University School of Law.

== Career ==
From 1998 to 2006, Fast was chair of the Fayette County Republican Executive Committee. He was elected to the West Virginia House of Delegates in 2014 and assumed office in 2015. Since 2017, Fast has served as chair of the House Industry and Labor Committee. In the 2021–2022 legislative session, Fast is vice chair of the House Judiciary Committee. He previously served as co-chair of the House Jails and Prisons Committee. Fast also owns and operates the Fast Law Office L.C.
