= Jason Harshbarger =

American politician (born 1974)

Member of the West Virginia House of Delegates from the 7th district
- In office December 1, 2016 – August 30, 2019
- Preceded by: Lynwood Ireland
- Succeeded by: Trenton Barnhart

Personal details
- Born: November 27, 1974 (age 51) Parkersburg, West Virginia, U.S.
- Party: Republican

Jason Harshbarger (born November 27, 1974) is an American politician who served in the West Virginia House of Delegates from the 7th district from 2016 to 2019.

On August 14, 2019, he announced that he was resigning from the legislature to become a lobbyist for Dominion Resources.
