= Henry Dillon (American politician) =

American politician (born 1981)

Henry Corby Dillon

Member of the West Virginia House of Representatives from the 29th district
- Incumbent
- Assumed office December 1, 2022
- Preceded by: Brandon Steele

Personal details
- Born: Huntington, West Virginia, U.S.
- Party: Republican
- Spouse: Debbie Dillon
- Children: Sarah, Emma, Henry, and Anna
- Education: B.A. in English, a master's degree in secondary education, and a Ph.D. in leadership with an emphasis on school building Marshall University
- Occupation: Educator

Henry Corby Dillon (born August 8, 1981) is an American politician serving as a member of the West Virginia House of Delegates from the 29th district. Elected on November 8, 2022, he assumed office on December 1, 2022. He previously ran for election in 2016 for the 19th district but did not advance to the general election.

== Biography ==
Dillon was born in Huntington, West Virginia to Don Dillon and Linda Dillon. He went to Marshall University and earned a B.A. in English, a master's degree in secondary education, and a Ph.D. in leadership with an emphasis on school building. He is a Baptist. He currently resides in Fort Gay, West Virginia.
