= Steven Schetrom =

American politician

Member-elect of the West Virginia House of Delegates from the 86th district
- Assuming office December 2026
- Succeeding: Bryan Ward

Personal details
- Party: Republican

Steven Schetrom is an American politician. A member of the Republican Party, he is the member-elect for the 86th district of the West Virginia House of Delegates.
