= Darren Thorne =

American politician

Member of the West Virginia Senate from the 15th district
- Incumbent
- Assumed office December 20, 2024 Serving with Tom Willis
- Preceded by: Charles S. Trump

Member of the West Virginia House of Representatives from the 89th district
- In office December 1, 2022 – December 20, 2024
- Succeeded by: David Cannon

Personal details
- Party: Republican
- Occupation: Farmer

Darren Thorne is an American politician serving as a member of the West Virginia Senate from the 15th district. He previously served as a member of the West Virginia House of Delegates from the 89th district.

In December 2024 Thorne was appointed by Governor Jim Justice to fill a vacancy in the West Virginia Senate.
