= Daniel Linville =

American politician

Assistant Majority Whip
- In office December 1, 2020 – June 26, 2026
- Leader: Roger Hanshaw

Member of the West Virginia House of Delegates from the 16th district
- In office August 1, 2018 – June 26, 2026
- Preceded by: C.E. Romine
- Succeeded by: Aaron Holley

Personal details
- Born: Milton, West Virginia, U.S.
- Party: Republican
- Parent(s): Steve Linville (father); Carla Linville (mother)
- Education: Marshall University (BA)
- Website: linvilleforwv.com

Daniel Linville is an American politician and business owner who served as a Republican Assistant Majority Whip in the West Virginia House of Delegates, representing the 16th district.

== Early life ==
Linville was born and raised in Milton, West Virginia to parents Carla and Steve Linville and graduated from Marshall University.

== Career ==
=== Political career ===
Linville was appointed to the West Virginia House of Delegates as a member from the 16th district in August 2018 after C.E. Romine resigned for health and personal reasons. He successfully sought reelection in the 2020 general election.

In addition to his party leadership position in the House, Linville served as the chair of the Technology & Infrastructure Committee. He additionally served on the Finance Committee; Committee on Senior, Children and Family Issues; and the Small Business Entrepreneurship and Economic Development Committee. Linville was also a member of several interim committees, including the Employee Suggestion Award Board, of which he served as chair; the Select Committee on Infrastructure, of which he served as vice chair; the Joint Standing Committee on Finance; the Legislative Oversight Committee on Regional Jail and Correctional Facility Authority; and the Joint Committee on Technology.

Linville resigned from the West Virginia House in June 2026 and was subsequently appointed as Director of Special Projects, a position in the administration of Governor Patrick Morrisey.

=== Community involvement ===
Linville is involved with several civic organizations, including the Rotary Club; Cabell County Farm Bureau; and on the Cabell-Wayne Beekeeper's Association. He is also a member of the Board of Directors of the Keith Albee Performing Arts Theater.
