= Mike DeVault =

American politician

Member of the West Virginia House of Representatives from the 74th district
- In office December 1, 2022 – January 12, 2026
- Succeeded by: Guy Ward

Personal details
- Born: April 25, 1958 (age 68) Fairmont, West Virginia, U.S.
- Party: Republican
- Spouse: Kimberly J. DeVault
- Occupation: Business Owner

Mike DeVault (born April 25, 1958) is an American politician who served as a member of the West Virginia House of Delegates from the 74th district. He owns two businesses. He resigned from the West Virginia House in January 2026.

== Personal life ==
DeVault is a Christian.
