= William Vest (politician) =

American politician

Member of the West Virginia House of Delegates from the 50th district
- Incumbent
- Assumed office August 26, 2026
- Preceded by: Elliott Pritt

Personal details
- Party: Republican

William J. Vest is an American politician serving as a Republican member of the West Virginia House of Delegates for the 50th district. He was appointed to take the place of Elliott Pritt, who resigned after sexual abuse allegations. Vest took the oath of office on August 26, 2026. He retired from the West Virginia Division of Corrections and Rehabilitation. He was previously the superintendent of Federal Correctional Institution, Beckley and the deputy warden of Mount Olive Correctional Complex. Vest was also a correctional officer, hospital security officer, and military police officer in the United States Army.
