= Tom Clark (politician) =

American politician from West Virginia

Member of the West Virginia House of Delegates from the 48th district
- In office January 12, 2024 – September 2025
- Preceded by: Caleb Hanna
- Succeeded by: Gregory Watt

Personal details
- Born: June 20, 1954 (age 72) Clarksburg, West Virginia, U.S.
- Party: Republican
- Spouse: Teresa Clark
- Education: Marshall University

Tom Clark is an American politician from West Virginia. He served as a Republican member of the West Virginia House of Delegates, representing the 48th district from 2024 to 2025.

== Career ==
Clark served as President of the Webster County Commission. In January 2024, Governor Jim Justice appointed Clark to fill the vacancy created by Caleb Hanna. Clark ran for re-election in the 2024 West Virginia House of Delegates election. He resigned in September 2025 after moving out of his district.

== Education ==
Clark received a bachelor of arts in occupational management from Marshall University, while also attending Glenville State College and the United States Mine Health and Safety Academy.

== Personal life ==
Clark is and his wife, Teresa, have two daughters and seven grandchildren. Clark is a Baptist.
