= University of Kentucky cheerleading squad =

Cheerleading squad representing the University of Kentucky

The University of Kentucky cheerleading squad represents the University of Kentucky in Lexington, Kentucky. It was founded in 1905 and its first cheerleaders were yell leaders who were usually male. University of Kentucky's first coed squad began in 1938, consisting of four males and four females. The coed squad became the norm in the late 60s, early 70s. T. Lynn Williamson was the cheerleading advisor from 1978 until his retirement in 2020. Williamson oversaw the program and brought in coaches to help build and advance the cheerleading program. Williamson's role encouraged Dale Baldwin to attend the University of Kentucky, who was a member of the University of Kentucky Cheerleading squad when the team won its first national championship in 1985. The University of Kentucky cheerleading squad has won the Universal Cheerleaders Association National College Cheerleading Championship twenty-four times.

== National recognition ==
University of Kentucky cheer has won national championships the following years: 1985, 1987–88, 1992, 1995–2002, 2004–06, 2008–10, 2012, 2014 and 2016–19. There has not been another team to win as many national championships as the University of Kentucky cheerleading squad.

== Coaching staff ==
- Ryan Martin O'Connor, Head Coach
- Whitney Agee Hollman, Assistant Coach

== Teams ==
=== Blue squad ===
The Blue squad, formerly known as the Wildcat Squad in the 80s, consists of at least 12 members (6 females and 6 males), not including alternates, who compete for the National Championship, and cheer for football and men's basketball. Members receive a scholarship up to in-state tuition at the University of Kentucky.

=== White squad ===
The White squad, formerly known as the Ladycat Squad in the 80s, cheers for women's basketball and some football games. Over the years, the squad has increased in size from having four couples (8 people) in the 80s when Dale Baldwin was on the team to 20-25 cheerleaders. Members of the White squad do receive some tuition scholarships.

== Tryouts ==
- Cheer
- Fight Song
- Standing Tumbling, 2 passes
- Running Tumbling, 2 passes
- Gameday Stunts, 5 examples
  - Skills: Toss cupie/lib/stretch, tic tocs, full up variations
- Elite Stunts, 3-5 examples
  - hand in hand variations, rewind variations, back handsprings, front handsprings,
  - Requirement: Females double down from a body position

== Practice schedule ==
- Weekly on Monday, Wednesday, Friday, and Sunday. Strength Workouts on Tuesday and Thursday
- Additional practice scheduled as needed

== Hazing scandal ==
In 2020, the University of Kentucky cheerleading team was involved in a hazing investigation which resulted in firing of the cheerleading staff members, Head coach Jomo Thompson was fired along with assistant cheerleading coaches Spenser Clan, Ben Head, and Kelsey LaCroix while longtime advisor T. Lynn Williamson retired. The scandal included hazing, public nudity and use of alcoholic drinks. In the aftermath, over 800 former Kentucky cheerleaders issued a statement in support of the coaches.

== Alumni ==
=== Alumni reunion ===
Every five years, there is a cheerleading reunion for anyone that has cheered on the University of Kentucky cheerleading team. Dale Baldwin, a cheerleading historian, has looked through yearbooks and roosters to locate and bring alumni together for these reunions. 350 former cheerleaders were at the last reunion.

=== Notable alumni ===
- Whitney Agee Hollman

== See also ==
- Cheerleading
