= Simon Hornby =

British businessman (1934–2010)

Sir Simon Michael Hornby FBIM FRSA (29 December 1934 – 17 July 2010) was a British businessman. He was chairman of WHSmith, the British retail chain, the Royal Horticultural Society and the Design Council. He founded the National Literacy Trust.

== Early life ==
Simon Michael Hornby was born on 29 December 1934 in London. He was the son of Michael Hornby and grandson of St John Hornby. He grew up on his father's estate at Pusey House in Berkshire (now Oxfordshire) and was educated at Eton College, New College, Oxford and Harvard Business School. He served in the Grenadier Guards as a 2nd Lieutenant from 1953 to 1955.

== Career ==
Hornby followed his father and grandfather on to the board of WHSmith, becoming Chairman in 1982. During his chairmanship the company acquired the Our Price records chain and the Paperchase stationery chain. They developed the Do It All DIY superstores and took a half-share in the Richard Branson created Virgin Megastores. Hornby also oversaw the acquisition of rival booksellers Waterstone's from former WHSmith manager, Tim Waterstone.

His hobby was gardening and he created gardens first at Lake House, close to Pusey, then at The Ham, his last home near Wantage. He wrote on gardening for The Tatler and was President of the Royal Horticultural Society from 1994 to 2001. He was chairman of the Design Council from 1986 to 1992.

== Personal life ==
He married Sheran Cazalet, the sister of his friend, the high court judge Sir Edward Cazalet, and daughter of the Queen Mother's horse trainer Peter Cazalet. They had no children.

== Honours ==
Hornby was knighted in the 1988 New Year Honours.
