= Trenton Barnhart =

American politician (born 1996)

Member of the West Virginia Senate from the 3rd district
- Incumbent
- Assumed office January 27, 2026 Serving with Mike Azinger
- Preceded by: Donna Boley

Member of the West Virginia House of Delegates from the 9th district
- In office December 1, 2022 – January 27, 2026
- Preceded by: Dennis Kimes
- Succeeded by: Betsy Kelly

Member of the West Virginia House of Delegates from the 7th district
- In office September 17, 2019 – December 1, 2022
- Preceded by: Jason Harshbarger
- Succeeded by: Charles Sheedy

Personal details
- Born: Trenton Carl Barnhart; November 12, 1996 (age 29) St. Marys, West Virginia, U.S.
- Party: Republican
- Education: B.A., M.B.A. University of Charleston

Trenton Carl Barnhart (born November 12, 1996) is an American politician who is a Republican member of the West Virginia Senate. He previously served in the West Virginia House of Delegates.

== Early life, education, and career ==
Barnhart was born in St. Marys, West Virginia to Mark and Lori Barnhart. He has a B.A. and an M.B.A from the University of Charleston. He was employed as a community banker and compliance auditor. He was also a member of the Pleasants County Republican Executive Committee.

== Elections ==
=== 2019 ===
Barnhart was appointed by West Virginia governor Jim Justice following the resignation of Delegate Jason Harshbarger, on September 17, 2019.

=== 2020 ===
In his first primary election, Barnhart was challenged by fellow Republican Kerry Murphy, whom he defeated with 53.65% of the vote.

Barnhart won unopposed in the general election.

=== 2026 ===
In January, 2026, Barnhart was appointed to the West Virginia Senate by governor Patrick Morrisey following the resignation of Senator Donna Boley.

== Tenure ==
=== Committee assignments ===
- Workforce Development (Vice Chair)
- Banking and Insurance
- Government Organization
- Health and Human Resources
- Small Business and Economic Development

Barnhart is an Assistant Majority Whip in the Republican-controlled House of Delegates.

Barnhart had a 14% rating from the West Virginia chapter of the Sierra Club as of 2020.

=== Gun rights ===
Barnhart is a member of the National Rifle Association of America. He has an A rating from the West Virginia Citizens Defense League, a gun rights organization, of which he is member, as of 2020. Barnhart was a sponsor of HB 2739, a bill that would declare West Virginia a Second Amendment "sanctuary state."

=== DC statehood ===
With many of his fellow Delegates, Barnhart signed onto a resolution requesting West Virginia Senators and Congressmen to oppose bills that would allow statehood for the District of Columbia.

== Personal life ==
Barnhart is a Christian.
