= Lucia Valentine =

American politician

Member-elect of the West Virginia House of Delegates from the 97th district
- Assuming office December 2026
- Succeeding: S. Chris Anders

Personal details
- Party: Democratic

Lucia Valentine is an American politician. A member of the Democratic Party, she is the member-elect for the 97th district of the West Virginia House of Delegates.
