= Bill Flanigan =

American politician

Justice of the West Virginia Supreme Court of Appeals
- Incumbent
- Assumed office June 11, 2026
- Preceded by: Tom Ewing

Member of the West Virginia House of Delegates from the 4th district
- In office December 1, 2024 – June 9, 2026
- Preceded by: Diana Winzenreid
- Succeeded by: Shane Stack

Member of the West Virginia House of Delegates from the 51st district
- In office January 18, 2016 – December 1, 2016
- Preceded by: Amanda Pasdon
- Succeeded by: Rodney Pyles; John Williams

Personal details
- Born: James William Flanigan; June 20, 1974 (age 52) Clarksburg, West Virginia, U.S.
- Party: Republican
- Education: Salem University (BA); University of San Francisco (MA); West Virginia University (JD)

James William Flanigan (born June 20, 1974) is an American politician serving as a justice of the West Virginia Supreme Court of Appeals since 2026. Before being elected to the court he served as a Republican member of the West Virginia House of Delegates for the 4th district from 2024 to 2026 and previously represented the 51st district in 2016. He was initially appointed to the chamber and took his oath of office to represent the 51st district on January 18, 2016. However, he left after a year due to the rediscovery of testicular cancer, which he was first diagnosed with in 2007. Flanigan was honored on the 2017 West Virginia Medical Cannabis Act. He is an attorney.

Legal offices
| Preceded by Tom Ewing | Justice of the West Virginia Supreme Court of Appeals; 2026–present | Incumbent |
