= Whitney Agee Hollman =

American cheerleader

- Born: Whitney Marie Agee
- Education: University of Kentucky
- Occupation: cheerleading coach
- Spouse: Jay Hollman
- Children: 1

Whitney Marie Agee Hollman is an American cheerleading coach and retired cheerleader. She cheered for the University of Kentucky and was a member of the U.S. National Team, winning a gold medal at the International Cheer Union World Cheerleading Championships. She won four national championship titles through the Universal Cheerleaders Association and a partner stunt title with the National Cheerleaders Association. She was the head cheerleading coach at Purdue University from 2021 to 2022. Since 2022, she has been the assistant cheerleading coach at the University of Kentucky.

== Early life and education ==
Hollman grew up in Huntington, West Virginia and graduated from Spring Valley High School. She studied integrated strategic communications at the University of Kentucky.

== Cheerleading career ==
Hollman competed as an all star cheerleader with River Cities All Stars. She went on to cheer for the University of Kentucky cheerleading squad. As a college student, she also was a college instructor with the Universal Cheerleaders Association.

Hollman was a member of the co-ed U.S. National Team. She won four Universal Cheerleaders Association national championship titles, a National Cheerleaders Association partner stung title, and a gold medal at the International Cheer Union World Cheerleading Championships.

She coached all-star cheerleading teams and at the national level with V!ROC and the Universal Cheerleaders Association. In 2021, she was hired as the head cheerleading coach and spirit coordinator at Purdue University. In 2022, she was hired as the assistant cheerleading coach at the University of Kentucky.

== Personal life ==
Hollman is married to Jay Hollman, a two-time cheerleading national champion with the University of Central Florida and fellow member of the U.S. National Team. They have one son.
