= East Bank High School =

Former school in West Virginia, United States

Coordinates: 38.2166°N 81.4420°W

East Bank High School was a public high school in East Bank, West Virginia in Kanawha County. Its teams competed as the Pioneers. It closed in 1999 in a consolidation with Dupont High School to form Riverside High School.

Jerry West played basketball for the high school. It was established in 1912 and originally known as Cabin Creek District High School.

West won a state championship with the East Bank High School basketball team and graduated in 1956. He was photographed with the team by DeLuze Studio in Charleston, West Virginia. A crowd celebrating the state championship was photographed in front of the school. West was the first high school player in West Virginia history to score 900 points in a season.

The football team won several state championships.

A historical marker commemorates the school's history. The yearbook was called the Kanawahan. Alumnus Don Stamper helped build a half-court basketball court on the site of the school.

== Notable people ==
- Tresa Howell, member of the West Virginia House of Delegates
- Donny Kees, musician and songwriter
- Jerry West, NBA player
