= Michael Hornby =

Michael Charles St John Hornby (2 January 1899 – 7 December 1987) was vice chairman of WHSmith, the British retail chain, for over 20 years.

Michael Charles St John Hornby was the son of St John Hornby and his wife Cicely Rachel Emily Barclay. In 1934, he purchased Pusey House near Faringdon in Berkshire (now Oxfordshire) where he subsequently lived.

He was vice chairman of WHSmith, the British retail chain from 1944 to 1965.

In 1960, following the verdict in favour of Penguin Books and the subsequent publication of Lady Chatterley's Lover, Hornby commented, "It will be stocked but it will not be on display. You will have to ask for it."

He married Nicolette Joan Ward (died 1988), the daughter of Captain Hon. Cyril Augustus Ward and Baroness Irene de Brienen, the granddaughter of the 1st Earl of Dudley, on 15 November 1928. They lived at Pusey House, Faringdon, Berkshire, and had children:

- Susan Mary Hornby (19 October 1929 – 27 January 2005), who married John Spencer-Churchill, 11th Duke of Marlborough in 1951. They had three children and were divorced in 1960. She married landowner Alan Cyril Heber-Percy (born 1935) in 1962. They had one daughter in 1968 and were later divorced. She married industrialist John Osborne Gough, MBE (1932 - 25 April 2011) in 1983.
- Sir Simon Michael Hornby (1934–2010)
- Charles Nicholas Hornby (1939–1996)

Hornby died in December 1987.

== Arms ==
Coat of arms of Michael Hornby

Motto
Crede Cornu
