= Rick Garcia =

American politician

Member of the West Virginia House of Delegates from the 76th district
- Incumbent
- Assumed office December 1, 2024
- Preceded by: Joey Garcia

Personal details
- Party: Democratic

Rick Garcia is an American politician serving as a Democratic member of the West Virginia House of Delegates for the 76th district. He was named president of the Marion County Commission in December 2019.
