= Jordan Maynor =

American politician

Jordan Maynor is an American politician and a Republican member of the West Virginia House of Delegates representing District 28 since August 24, 2021.

== Education ==
Maynor graduated from Mountain State University.
