= Stanley Adkins (politician) =

American politician

Member of the West Virginia House of Delegates from the 49th district
- Incumbent
- Assumed office December 1, 2024
- Preceded by: Heather Tully

Personal details
- Born: July 10, 1949 (age 77) Richwood, West Virginia, U.S.
- Party: Republican
- Spouse: None
- Children: 3
- Education: West Virginia University

Stanley Adkins (born July 10, 1949) is an American politician serving as a Republican member of the West Virginia House of Delegates for the 49th district. He is a certified public accountant. He graduated from West Virginia University.
