= George Street (West Virginia politician) =

American state legislator from West Virginia

Member of the West Virginia House of Representatives from the 83rd district
- Incumbent
- Assumed office December 1, 2022

Personal details
- Party: Republican
- Education: US Army EOD school
- Occupation: Explosive Ordnance technician, Farmer

George Street is an American politician who represents District 83 in the West Virginia House of Delegates as a Republican. He has been serving in that position since December 1, 2022.

== Biography ==
Street is a Christian.
