= John Jordan (West Virginia politician) =

American politician

Member of the West Virginia House of Delegates from the 42nd district
- Incumbent
- Assumed office January 13, 2026
- Preceded by: Brandon Steele

Personal details
- Party: Republican

John K. Jordan is an American politician serving as a Republican member of the West Virginia House of Delegates for the 42nd district. On January 13, 2026, governor Patrick Morrisey appointed Jordan to fill the vacancy left by Brandon Steele. Jordan graduated from the University of the Cumberlands with a bachelor's in business administration. He also earned a Master of Science in Church Leadership from Assemblies of God Theological Seminary. He has been the lead pastor at Calvary Assembly of God in Beckley, West Virginia, since 1998 and has also served as the chaplain at Raleigh General Hospital since 2000.

Jordan filed to run for the 42nd district in the 2026 election. On May 12, 2026, Jordan won the Republican nomination for the seat, defeating challenger Rick Jones. Jordan will progress to the 2026 general election where he will be run against Democratic nominee Courtney Vandall.
