= Lori Dittman =

American politician

Member of the West Virginia House of Delegates
- Incumbent
- Assumed office December 1, 2022
- Preceded by: John Hardy
- Constituency: District 63

Personal details
- Party: Republican

Lori Cowger Dittman is an American politician from West Virginia. She is a Republican and represents District 63 in the West Virginia House of Delegates since 2022.

Dittman has been a teacher in Braxton County Schools.
