= Bryan Smith (West Virginia politician) =

American politician

Member of the West Virginia House of Delegates from the 73rd district
- Incumbent
- Assumed office December 1, 2024
- Preceded by: Amy Summers

Personal details
- Born: June 20, 1974 (age 52) Grafton, West Virginia, U.S.
- Party: Republican

Bryan Smith (born June 20, 1974) is an American politician serving as a Republican member of the West Virginia House of Delegates for the 73rd district. He graduated from Grafton High School in 1993 and Computer Tech in Fairmont, West Virginia in 1995. He works as an administrative assistant at J. W. Ruby Memorial Hospital. Smith previously served on the Economic Development Authority for Taylor County, West Virginia and volunteered at a food pantry. He is also a business owner.
