= David McCormick (West Virginia politician) =

American politician

Member of the West Virginia House of Delegates from the 82nd district
- Incumbent
- Assumed office December 1, 2024
- Preceded by: Debbie Warner

Personal details
- Born: January 11, 1969 (age 57) Morgantown, West Virginia, U.S.
- Party: Republican
- Spouse: Lisa
- Education: West Virginia University

David McCormick Jr. (born January 11, 1969) is an American politician serving as a Republican member of the West Virginia House of Delegates for the 82nd district. He is the Assistant Majority Leader. He graduated from West Virginia University in 1991 with a Bachelor of Science in Marketing. McCormick is self employed with Omega Commercial Interiors. He is a Protestant. He is also an executive board member of the West Virginia Golf Association.
