= Mickey Petitto =

American politician

Mickey Petitto is an American politician from West Virginia. She is a Republican and represents District 70 in the West Virginia House of Delegates since 2022. She was succeeded by Shannon Welsh.

Petitto is from Clarksburg and has a background in real estate and accounting.
