= Donald Bennett (West Virginia politician) =

American politician

Member of the West Virginia House of Delegates from the 94th district
- Incumbent
- Assumed office March 23, 2026
- Preceded by: Larry Kump

Personal details
- Party: Republican

Donald Lee Bennett is an American politician serving as a Republican member of the West Virginia House of Delegates for the 94th district. On March 23, 2026, governor Patrick Morrisey appointed him to fill the vacancy left by the death of Larry Kump. Bennett served as a Cavalry Scout in the United States Army for eight years. He works in health care consulting and is a small business owner. As of 2026, he had lived in Martinsburg, West Virginia, for almost 20 years.
