= Anitra Hamilton =

American politician

Member of the West Virginia House of Delegates from the 81st district
- Incumbent
- Assumed office May 5, 2023
- Preceded by: Danielle Walker

Personal details
- Party: Democratic

Anitra Hamilton is an American politician from West Virginia. She is a Democrat and represents District 81, which covers Monongalia County, in the West Virginia House of Delegates since 2023.

Hamilton is the President of the NAACP for Morgantown and Kingwood. In 2023, Governor Jim Justice appointed Hamilton to fill the vacancy created by Danielle Walker.
