= Bill Bell (West Virginia politician) =

American politician

Member of the West Virginia House of Delegates from the 8th district
- Incumbent
- Assumed office July 14, 2025
- Preceded by: David Kelly

Personal details
- Party: Republican

William Bell is an American politician serving as a Republican member of the West Virginia House of Delegates for the 8th district. In July 2025, he was appointed by Governor Patrick Morrisey to replace David Kelly, who left the House to become the Commissioner of the Division of Corrections and Rehabilitation. Bell serves on the Paden City Common Council, is a social studies teacher for Wetzel County Schools, and is an adjunct faculty member at West Virginia University at Parkersburg. He graduated from WVU Parkersburg with a bachelor’s degree in elementary education. Bell also earned master's degrees from both Western Governors University and Ashland University.
