= Bill Roop =

American politician

Carl Roop

Member of the West Virginia House of Representatives from the 44 district
- Incumbent
- Assumed office August 2, 2024
- Preceded by: Todd Kirby

Personal details
- Party: Republican

Carl "Bill" Roop is an American politician from West Virginia. He is a Republican and represents District 44 in the West Virginia House of Delegates.

In 2024, Governor Jim Justice appointed Roop to fill the vacancy created by Todd Kirby.
