= Geno Chiarelli =

American politician

Member of the West Virginia House of Representatives from the 78th district
- Incumbent
- Assumed office December 1, 2022

Personal details
- Born: December 7, 1994 (age 31)
- Party: Republican
- Education: West Virginia University
- Occupation: Substance abuse counselor

Eugene "Geno" Chiarelli (born December 7, 1994) is an American politician serving as a member of the West Virginia House of Delegates from the 78th district.

== Biography ==
Chiarelli earned a bachelor's degree from West Virginia University in 2018. He has worked with child protective services and as a substance abuse counselor. He is a Roman Catholic.

== Political positions ==
In an attempt to stop vape usage, Chiarelli introduced a bill to limit vape shops to one for 15,000 people in each county. He is Anti-Abortion.
