= Patrick Lucas =

American politician (born 1967)

Member of the West Virginia House of Representatives from the 24th district
- Incumbent
- Assumed office December 1, 2022

Personal details
- Born: March 11, 1967 (age 59) Huntington, West Virginia, U.S.
- Party: Republican
- Spouse: Paula Lucas
- Children: 2
- Education: Bachelor of Arts in marketing
- Alma mater: Marshall University
- Occupation: Real estate agent

Patrick Lucas (born March 11, 1967) is an American politician serving as a member of the West Virginia House of Delegates from the 24th district. Elected on November 8, 2022, he assumed office on December 1, 2022.

== Biography ==
Lucas was born March 11, 1967, in Huntington, West Virginia to parents Dick Lucas and Maureen Woosley. He works as a real estate agent outside of politics, at a company called Century 21 Homes & Land Real Estate. He graduated from Marshall University in 1991 with a Bachelor of Arts degree in marketing. He is a Baptist.
