= Marshall Clay =

American politician

Member of the West Virginia House of Delegates from the 51st district
- Incumbent
- Assumed office December 1, 2024
- Preceded by: Tom Fast

Personal details
- Party: Republican

Marshall W. Clay is an American politician serving as a Republican member of the West Virginia House of Delegates for the 51st district. He also served over eight years as the sergeant-at-arms of the House of Delegates. He spent 21 years in the United States Navy and retired as a Senior Chief Petty Officer.
