= Brandon Steele =

American politician

Member of the West Virginia House of Delegates
- In office December 1, 2018 – December 18, 2025
- Preceded by: Rick Moye
- Succeeded by: John K. Jordan
- Constituency: 29th district (2018–2022); 42nd district (2022–2025)

Personal details
- Born: Brandon Steele; July 12, 1981 (age 45) Beckley, West Virginia, U.S.
- Party: Republican
- Spouse: Brianne Steele
- Children: 5
- Education: Mountain State University (BS); Marquette University (JD)

Brandon Steele (born July 12, 1981) is an American politician who served as a Delegate to the West Virginia House of Delegates from 2018 to 2025. He is a Republican.

== Early life, education, and career ==
Steele was born in Beckley, West Virginia to Larry and Donna Steele. He received a Bachelor of Science in criminal justice at Mountain State University in 2004 and his Juris Doctor at Marquette University in 2013. In 2015, he was employed as a private attorney-at-law. In 2016, he was employed as a prosecuting attorney for Raleigh County. He also served in the United States Marine Corps.

== Tenure and political positions ==
Steele served in the West Virginia House from 2018 until his resignation in December 2025.

=== Abortion ===
In July 2022, Steele attempted to pass a ban on all abortions, without exception for rape, incest, or the health or life of the mother, in the House of Delegates, though the ban ultimately did not pass. He opposed amendments on the proposed ban that would have allowed a narrow exception for rape or incest.

=== Coronavirus ===
In March 2021, Steele tested positive for COVID-19. Steele experienced minor symptoms and took a leave of absence from the House of Delegates, though refused to receive a COVID-19 vaccine. In addition, Steele was the lead sponsor of a bill that would provide a greater exemption from vaccine mandates for private and parochial schools and loosen other requirements for compulsory vaccination.

=== Criminal code ===
Steele led the effort to rewrite and modernize the West Virginia criminal code, which many believed to be outdated and ineffective. He was the lead sponsor of House Bill 2017, which would rewrite the code.

=== Gun control ===
Steele was the lead sponsor of House Bill 2694, which prevented state police from complying with federal authorities on matters related to gun control. Steele framed the bill as essential to the Second Amendment, stating, "[e]ither you like gun rights or you don't." The bill was later amended by the West Virginia State Senate to specifically inhibit the ability of local law enforcement from complying with gun control executive orders issued by Joe Biden. Steele had an "A+" rating from the NRA Political Victory Fund as of 2020 and received their endorsement in his campaign. He also had a 93% rating from the West Virginia Citizen's Defense League, a local gun rights organization, as of 2018.

=== Worker's rights ===
Steele voted for Senate Bill 11, a bill that would make it more difficult for employees to strike. He had a 0% rating from the West Virginia AFL–CIO as of 2020.

== Elections ==
=== 2018 ===
In his first primary, Steele defeated fellow Republican Zachary Meador by nearly a 2–1 margin, securing 66.26% of the vote to receive his party's nomination.

In the general election, Steele defeated incumbent Democrat Rick Moye with 52.34% of the vote.

=== 2020 ===
In his first primary since defeating the incumbent Moye, Steele ran unopposed.

Steele's second general election was significantly less competitive, as Steele defeated Democrat Xavier Oglesby with 77.26% of the vote.

=== Committee assignments ===
- Government Organization (Chair)
- House Rules
- Small Business and Economic Development

== Personal life ==
Steele is married to Brianne Steele and has five children. He is a Protestant.

=== Legal Issues ===
On January 7, 2025, an anonymous source released two 911 calls made by Steele's wife. The calls, from a December 23, 2024, incident, alleged that Steele was intoxicated and armed with weapons outside their residence in Mabscott. Steele was subsequently stripped of his chairmanship of the Judiciary Committee.
