= Clay Riley =

American politician

Member of the West Virginia House of Representatives from the 78th district
- Incumbent
- Assumed office December 1, 2022

Member of the West Virginia House of Representatives from the 48th district
- In office 2020 – December 1, 2022

Personal details
- Born: Shinnston, West Virginia, U.S.
- Party: Republican
- Education: West Virginia University
- Occupation: Engineer
- Website: https://www.cprforwv.com/

Clay Riley is an American politician serving as a member of the West Virginia House of Delegates.

== Biography ==
Riley earned electrical and computer engineering degrees from West Virginia University. He graduated from Lincoln High School.

== Electoral history ==
Riley first ran in the 2018 West Virginia House of Delegates election, but lost. He was elected to the 48th district in the 2020 West Virginia House of Delegates election. He was redistricted to the 78th district in the 2022 West Virginia House of Delegates election. He ran uncontested in the 2024 West Virginia House of Delegates election.
