= Adam Burkhammer =

American politician

Member of the West Virginia House of Delegates from the 64th district
- Incumbent
- Assumed office December 1, 2020

Personal details
- Party: Republican
- Children: 6

Adam Burkhammer is an American businessman and politician serving as a member of the West Virginia House of Delegates from the 64th district. Elected in November 2020, he assumed office on December 1, 2020.

== Early life and education ==
Burkhammer is a native of Buckhannon, West Virginia and graduated from Buckhannon-Upshur High School. He attended Hobart Institute of Welding Technology and West Virginia Christian University.

== Career ==
Burkhammer is founder and manager of A.J. Burk, LLC and RiCo Properties, LLC. Burkhammer and his wife, Jamie Burkhammer, have six children. He was elected to the West Virginia House of Delegates in November 2020 and assumed office on December 1, 2020.
