= S. Chris Anders =

American politician

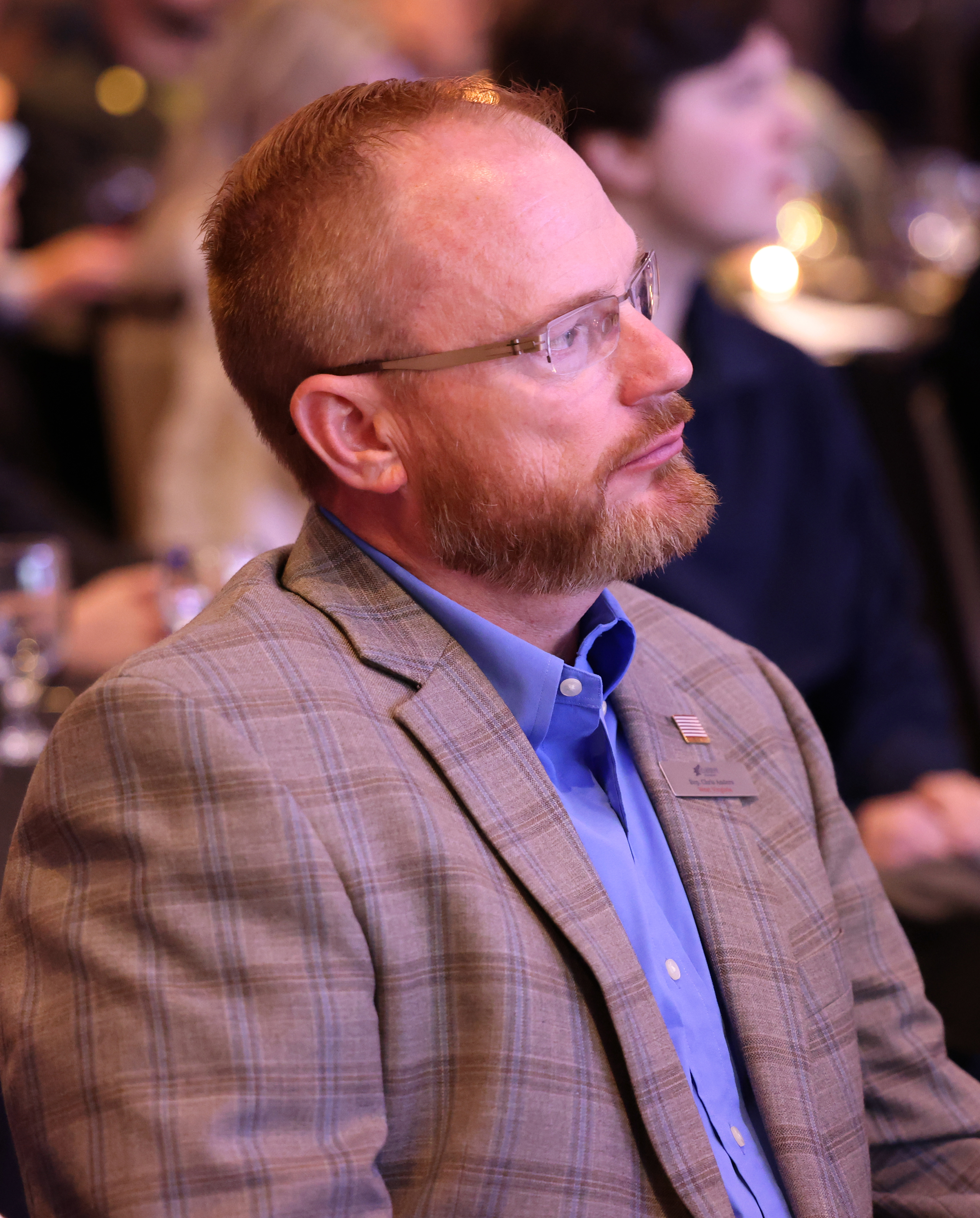
- Anders at the 2024 Hazlitt Summit hosted by Young Americans for Liberty Foundation

Member-elect of the West Virginia House of Delegates from the 97th district
- Incumbent
- Assumed office December 1, 2024
- Preceded by: John Hardy
- Succeeded by: Lucia Valentine (elect)

Personal details
- Party: Republican

S. Chris Anders is an American politician. He serves as a Republican member for the 97th district of the West Virginia House of Delegates.
