= Aaron Holley =

American politician

Member of the West Virginia House of Delegates from the 22nd district
- Incumbent
- Assumed office July 28, 2026
- Preceded by: Daniel Linville

Personal details
- Party: Republican

Aaron Holley is an American politician serving as a Republican member of the West Virginia House of Delegates for the 22nd district. He was appointed to take the place of Daniel Linville, who resigned for a different job. Holley took the oath of office on July 28, 2026. He is a long-time employee of CSX and a Baptist.
