= Sarah Drennan =

American politician (born 1981)

Member of the West Virginia House of Delegates from the 20th district
- Incumbent
- Assumed office December 1, 2024
- Preceded by: Geoff Foster

Personal details
- Born: January 8, 1981 (age 45) Huntington, West Virginia, U.S.
- Party: Republican
- Spouse: Mark Drennan
- Children: 2
- Education: Marshall University

Sarah Drennan (born January 8, 1981) is an American politician serving as a Republican member of the West Virginia House of Delegates for the 20th district. She is the Assistant Majority Whip. She is also an NICU registered nurse. Drennan graduated from Marshall University-St. Mary's School of Nursing.
