= Shane Stack =

American politician

Member of the West Virginia House of Delegates from the 4th district
- Incumbent
- Assumed office July 23, 2026
- Preceded by: Bill Flanigan

Personal details
- Party: Republican

Shane Thomas Stack is an American politician serving as a Republican member of the West Virginia House of Delegates for the 4th district. On July 7, 2026, he was appointed by governor Patrick Morrisey to replace Bill Flanigan, who resigned to join the West Virginia Supreme Court of Appeals. Stack took the oath of office on July 23, 2026. He lives in Triadelphia, West Virginia. He is a licensed auctioneer and a certified appraiser. Stack owns a small business called Island Pawn & Gun. He graduated from West Liberty University with a Bachelor of Science in Business Administration. He was previously the town treasurer for West Liberty, West Virginia and West Liberty University's Director of Alumni Affairs.
