= Winifrede, West Virginia =

- Unincorporated community
- Location within West Virginia Location within the United States
- Coordinates: 38°11′29″N 81°33′24″W
- Country: United States
- State: West Virginia
- County: Kanawha
- Elevation: 705 ft (215 m)
- Time zone: UTC-5 (Eastern (EST))
  - Summer (DST): UTC-4 (EDT)
- ZIP code: 25214
- Area codes: 304 & 681
- GNIS feature ID: 1549250

Winifrede is an unincorporated community in Kanawha County, West Virginia, United States. Winifrede is 2.5 miles (4.0 km) southwest of Chesapeake. Winifrede has a post office with ZIP code 25214. It is home of the Big Eagle Railroad (formerly known as Winifrede Mining and Manufacturing Company, Winifrede Collieries, and Winifrede Railroad), one of the oldest short-line railroad operations in the United States, having been in existence since 1850. The Winifrede Railroad was incorporated in November 1881 and opened in 1882; the original operation was closed in 1988 and reopened as the Big Eagle Railroad in 2000–01.

According to tradition, the community was named after a woman in Philadelphia.
