= Tresa Howell =

American politician

Member of the West Virginia House of Delegates from the 52nd district
- Incumbent
- Assumed office December 1, 2024
- Preceded by: Larry L. Rowe

Personal details
- Born: Charleston West Virginia, U.S.
- Party: Republican
- Education: University of Charleston

Tresa Howell is an American politician serving as a Republican member of the West Virginia House of Delegates for the 52nd district. She attended East Bank High School and graduated from the University of Charleston with a Bachelor of Science in Nursing. She is a nurse. Howell served as the Chairwoman of the Kanawha County Republican Executive Committee from July 2018 to July 2022. She was a delegate at the 2020 Republican National Convention.
