= Bryan Ward (politician) =

American politician

Bryan Ward (born September 15, 1965) is an American politician from West Virginia. He is a libertarian-leaning Republican and represents District 86 in the West Virginia House of Delegates since 2022, and he was succeeded by Steven Schetrom. His district covers eastern Pendleton and all of Hardy County. A farmer and retired public servant, Ward is a Christian and has one daughter.
