= Jonathan Kyle =

American politician

Member of the West Virginia House of Delegates from the 66th district
- Incumbent
- Assumed office December 1, 2024
- Preceded by: William Nestor

Personal details
- Born: October 5, 1982 (age 43) Elkins, West Virginia, U.S.
- Party: Republican
- Spouse: Angela D. Kyle
- Children: 3
- Education: Marshall University

Jonathan Kyle (born October 5, 1982) is an American politician serving as a Republican member of the West Virginia House of Delegates for the 66th district. He graduated from Marshall University with a Bachelor of Accounting, and is a real estate investor. Kyle is also the president of Mountaineer Insurance Services, which he founded in 2006. He has also been a board member of the Elkins-Randolph County Chamber of Commerce.
