= Lisa White (politician) =

American politician

Member of the West Virginia House of Delegates from the 96th district
- Incumbent
- Assumed office December 1, 2024
- Preceded by: Eric Householder

Personal details
- Born: March 7, 1959 (age 67) Washington, West Virginia, U.S.
- Party: Republican
- Spouse: William
- Children: 2

Lisa White (born March 7, 1959) is an American politician serving as a Republican member of the West Virginia House of Delegates for the 96th district. She is a retired marketing director. She graduated from Crossland High School.
