= Gregory Watt =

American politician

Member of the West Virginia House of Delegates from the 48th district
- Incumbent
- Assumed office October 3, 2025
- Preceded by: Tom Clark

Personal details
- Party: Republican

Gregory A. Watt is an American politician serving as a Republican member of the West Virginia House of Delegates for the 48th district. On October 3, 2025, he was appointed by Governor Patrick Morrisey to replace Tom Clark. Watt is also currently the Director of Programmatic Solutions Architecture for JANUS Research Group. He previously served in the United States Army for 28 years. Watt graduated from State University of New York at Fredonia with a Bachelor of Business Administration and from Webster University with a Master of Business Administration.
