= Joe Parsons (West Virginia politician) =

American politician

Member of the West Virginia House of Delegates from the 16th district
- Incumbent
- Assumed office December 1, 2024
- Preceded by: Steve Westfall

Personal details
- Party: Republican

Frederick Joe Parsons, nicknamed Happy Joe Parsons, is an American politician serving as a Republican member of the West Virginia House of Delegates for the 16th district. He was inducted into the West Virginia Broadcasting Hall of Fame in 2023.
