= David Green (West Virginia politician) =

American politician

Member of the West Virginia House of Delegates from the 36th district
- Incumbent
- Assumed office January 30, 2024
- Appointed by: Jim Justice
- Preceded by: Anita Hall

Personal details
- Party: Republican

Stephen "David" Green is an American politician from West Virginia. He is a Republican and represents District 36, which covers McDowell County, in the West Virginia House of Delegates since 2024.

Green is a graduate of Concord University. In 2024, Governor Jim Justice appointed Green to fill the vacancy created by Anita Hall.
