= Keith Marple =

American politician

Keith Marple is an American politician from West Virginia. He is a Republican and represents District 69 in the West Virginia House of Delegates since 2022.

Marple was a magistrate in Harrison County.
