= Adam Vance =

American politician

Member of the West Virginia House of Delegates from the 35th district
- Incumbent
- Assumed office December 1, 2022
- Preceded by: multi-member district

Personal details
- Born: Beckley, West Virginia
- Party: Republican

Adam Vance is an American politician from West Virginia. He is a Republican and represents District 35 in the West Virginia House of Delegates since 2022.

Vance is a candidate for the 9th district in the 2026 West Virginia Senate election.
