= Ian Masters (politician) =

West Virginia politician (born 1986)

Member of the West Virginia House of Representatives from the 91st district
- Incumbent
- Assumed office January 23, 2025
- Preceded by: Don Forsht

Personal details
- Born: February 27, 1986 (age 40) West Germany
- Party: Republican
- Spouse: Katelyn Masters
- Children: 4
- Education: West Virginia University

Ian T. Masters (born February 27, 1986) is an American politician and attorney who is currently serving as a Republican member of the West Virginia House of Delegates, representing the 91st district. The district is based in Berkeley County. He was appointed on January 23, 2025 to fill a vacancy left after Democratic representative-elect Joseph de Soto was arrested. A lawsuit was dismissed from the West Virginia Democratic Party over his appointment, due to de Soto switching party affiliations to Democrat prior to the vacancy.

== Personal life and career ==
Masters lives in Gerrardstown. He is married to Katelyn Masters and has four children. He is Christian. He was the President of the West Virginia Citizens Defense League, a gun lobby. He is a conservative. He is an alumnus of the West Virginia University College of Law.

== Political positions ==
Masters supports medical exemptions for K-12 vaccine mandates.
