= Guy Ward =

American politician

Member of the West Virginia House of Delegates from the 74th district
- Incumbent
- Assumed office January 28, 2026
- Preceded by: Mike DeVault
- In office December 1, 2020 – December 1, 2022
- Succeeded by: Mike DeVault

Personal details
- Party: Republican

Guy Ward is an American politician from West Virginia. He is a Republican and represented District 74 in the West Virginia House of Delegates from December 1, 2020 to December 1, 2022. In May 2022, he was defeated in the primary by Mike DeVault. He was appointed to the West Virginia House of Delegates for District 74 to replace Mike DeVault on January 28, 2026.
