= Betsy Kelly =

American politician

Member of the West Virginia House of Delegates from the 9th district
- Incumbent
- Assumed office February 17, 2026
- Preceded by: Trenton Barnhart

Personal details
- Born: 1979–1980
- Party: Republican

Betsy Kelly is an American politician serving as a Republican member of the West Virginia House of Delegates for the 9th district. On February 17, 2026, she was appointed to the House of Delegates by governor Patrick Morrisey to fill the vacancy left by Trenton Barnhart. She owns a farm. As a child, she served as a page for West Virginia senator Donna Boley. Kelly lives in Pennsboro, West Virginia.
