= Charles Sheedy (politician) =

American politician

Member of the West Virginia House of Representatives from the 7th district
- Incumbent
- Assumed office December 1, 2022
- Preceded by: Trenton Barnhart

Personal details
- Born: 23 February 1958 (age 68) Washington, Pennsylvania, United States
- Party: Republican
- Spouse: Debbie D. Sheedy
- Children: Jamie, Alan, Brandon, Charles Jr., and James
- Education: Point Park University, Fairmont State University, Mountain State University
- Occupation: Business owner

Military service
- Allegiance: United States
- Years of service: 1976-2013

Charles Sheedy Sr. (born February 23, 1958) is an American politician serving as a member of the West Virginia House of Delegates from the 7th district. Elected on November 8, 2022, he assumed office on December 1, 2022. He ran and lost in the Republican Primaries for 2020 West Virginia gubernatorial election.

== Biography ==
Sheedy served in the Army Reserve from 1976 to 2013, and worked in the West Virginia Department of Transportation in the DOH (Department of Highways) division, starting out as an equipment operator and ending his work as Marshall County administrator for the DOH after 30 years on the job.

== Legislative History ==
Cosponsor of West Virginia House Bill 2545 that was introduced on February 18, 2025 and would authorize corporal punishment in public schools.
