= Rick Hillenbrand =

American politician

Member of the West Virginia House of Representatives from the 88th district
- Incumbent
- Assumed office December 1, 2022

Personal details
- Born: Staten Island, New York, U.S.
- Party: Republican
- Spouse: Barbie
- Children: 4
- Education: State University of New York Maritime College; Massachusetts Institute of Technology
- Website: www.rick4wv88.com

Frederick "Rick" Hillenbrand is an American politician serving as a member of the West Virginia House of Delegates from the 88th district.

== Biography ==
Hillenbrand served in the United States Navy from 1978 to 1999. He qualified as an Unrestricted Line Officer in Submarines before becoming an Engineering Duty Officer, retiring as a Commander. He earned a Bachelor Engineering degree from State University of New York Maritime College in 1978. He earned two graduate degrees from the Massachusetts Institute of Technology in 1984, a Master of Science in Naval Architecture and Marine Engineering, and an Ocean Engineers degree. He is an Episcopalian. He moved to Hampshire County, West Virginia in 2011. He is an Eagle Scout and has volunteered for the organization for decades and is the recipient of many Scouting awards including the Silver Beaver, Silver Antelope and Silver Buffalo.
