= David Cannon (West Virginia politician) =

American politician

Member of the West Virginia House of Delegates from the 89th district
- Incumbent
- Assumed office January 13, 2025
- Preceded by: Darren Thorne

Personal details
- Party: Republican

David Cannon is an American politician serving as a Republican member of the West Virginia House of Delegates for the 89th district. On January 13, 2025, Governor Jim Justice appointed Cannon to take the place of Darren Thorne, who had been named to the West Virginia Senate. Cannon previously served as Hampshire County Commissioner until resigning on February 11, 2025.
