= Hollis Lewis =

American politician

Hollis T. Lewis is an American politician from West Virginia. He is a Democrat and represents District 57, which covers Kanawha County, in the West Virginia House of Delegates since 2023.

Lewis is a graduate of West Virginia State University and Southern University Law Center. In 2023, Governor Jim Justice appointed Lewis to fill the vacancy created by Doug Skaff.
