= Michael Amos (politician) =

American politician

Member of the West Virginia House of Delegates from the 27th district
- Incumbent
- Assumed office December 1, 2024
- Preceded by: Ric Griffith

Personal details
- Born: February 15, 1993 (age 33) Huntington, West Virginia, U.S.
- Party: Republican

Michael Amos (born February 15, 1993) is an American politician serving as a Republican member of the West Virginia House of Delegates for the 27th district. He works as a physician. Amos is a Southern Baptist. He graduated from Spring Valley High School in Huntington, West Virginia, Marshall University, and the Joan C. Edwards School of Medicine.
