= Joe Ellington =

American politician (born 1959)

Member of the West Virginia House of Delegates
- Incumbent
- Assumed office December 1, 2010
- Preceded by: Seat created
- Constituency: 27th district (2012–present); 25th district (2010–2012)

Personal details
- Born: May 12, 1959 (age 67) Flushing, Queens, New York
- Education: Guilford College; Duke University; Wake Forest School of Medicine
- Profession: Physician

Joe Carey Ellington Jr. (born May 12, 1959) is an American politician and a Republican member of the West Virginia House of Delegates representing District 27 since January 12, 2013. Ellington served consecutively from January 2011 until January 2013 in the District 25 seat.

== Education ==
Ellington earned his BS from Guilford College, his MS and PhD from Duke University, and his MD from Wake Forest School of Medicine.

== Elections ==
- 2012 Redistricted to District 27, Ellington ran in the three-way May 8, 2012 Republican Primary and placed second with 1,581 votes (32.8%), and placed second in the six-way November 6, 2012 General election with 9,930 votes (20.1%) behind former Senator John Shott and ahead of Republican Representative Marty Gearheart (Shott and Gearheart had both been redistricted from District 24) and Democratic nominees Ryan Flanigan, Greg Ball, and Bill Morefield, who had run for a District 25 seat in 2006 and 2010.
- 2006 To challenge District 25 incumbent Democratic Representative Marshall Long, Ellington ran in the four-way 2006 Republican Primary but did not place; incumbent Representatives Long and Republican Thomas M. Porter were both re-elected in the four-way two-position November 7, 2006 General election.
- 2008 To challenge Representative Long again, Ellington ran in the May 13, 2008 Republican Primary and placed second with 756 votes (36.4%), but lost four-way two-position November 4, 2008 General election to Democratic nominee John Frazier and incumbent Republican Representative Porter; Long placed third and Ellington placed fourth.
- 2010 Ellington ran in the May 11, 2010 Republican Primary and placed second with 747 votes (39.2%), Representative Porter died after the primary, but was replaced on the ballot for the four-way two-position November 2, 2010 General election; Ellington placed second with 4,693 votes (26.6%) behind Representative Frazier and ahead of Charles Terry (who had replaced Porter on the ballot) and Democratic nominee Billy Morefield.
