= Chuck Horst =

American politician and businessman

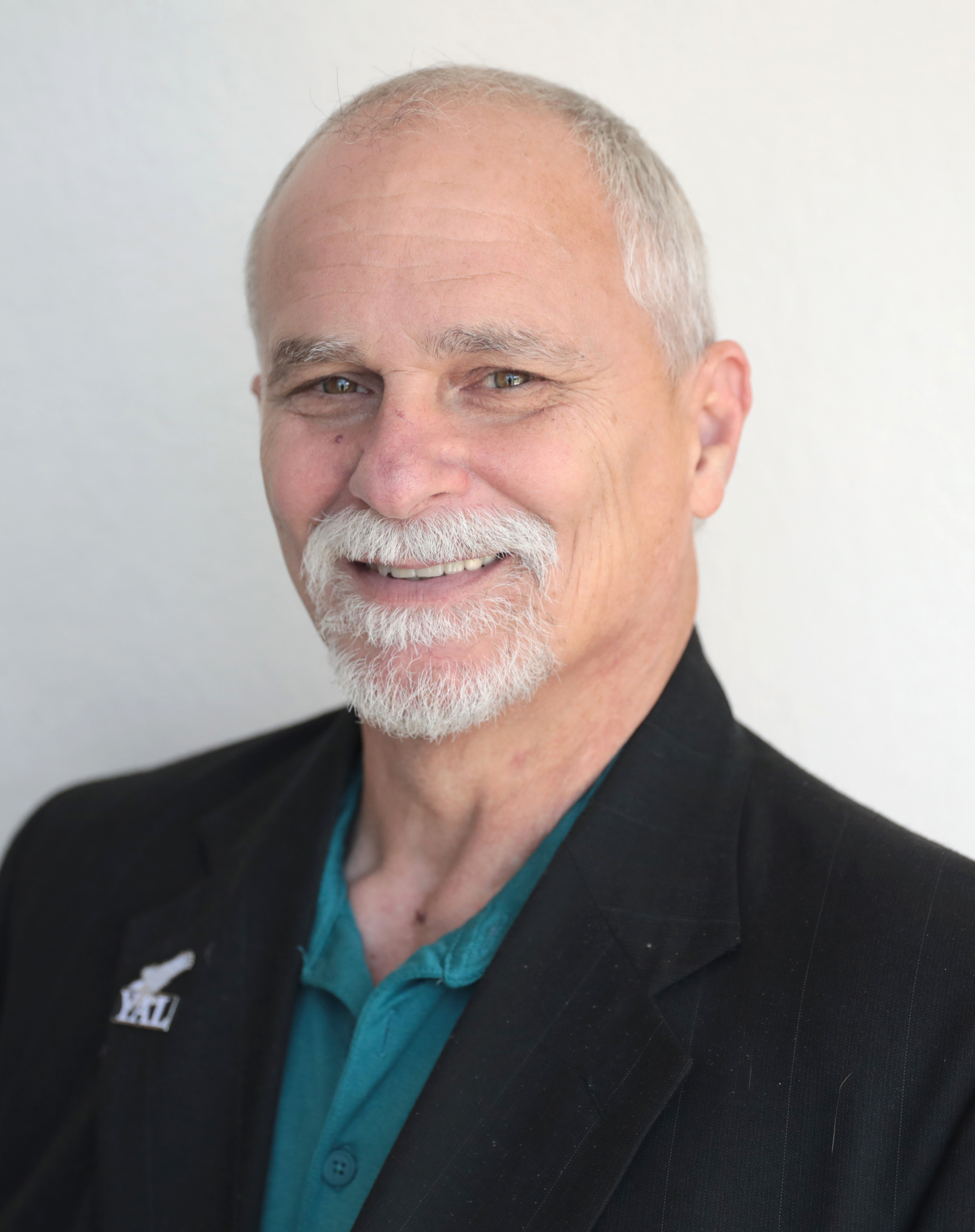
- Horst at the 2022 Hazlitt Summit hosted by Young Americans for Liberty Foundation

Member of the West Virginia House of Delegates from the 95th district
- Incumbent
- Assumed office December 1, 2020
- Preceded by: Tom Bibby

Personal details
- Born: Charles K. Horst; September 20, 1958 (age 67) Hagerstown, Maryland, U.S.
- Party: Republican
- Children: 3

Charles K. "Chuck" Horst Sr. (born September 20, 1958) is an American politician and businessman serving as a member of the West Virginia House of Delegates from the 62nd district. He assumed office on December 1, 2020.

== Early life and education ==
Horst was born in Hagerstown, Maryland.

== Career ==
Outside of politics, Horst worked as an automotive technician and owns Lucky Dog Auto Repair. He was elected to the West Virginia House of Delegates in November 2020 and assumed office on December 1, 2020.
