= William Ridenour =

American politician (born 1958)

Member of the West Virginia House of Representatives from the 100th district
- Incumbent
- Assumed office December 1, 2022

Personal details
- Born: May 7, 1958 (age 68) Springfield, Ohio
- Party: Republican
- Spouse: Jean
- Children: 3
- Education: Purdue University, University of Oklahoma, Marine Corps War College

William "Bill" Ridenour (born May 7, 1958) is an American politician serving as a member of the West Virginia House of Delegates from the 100th district.

== Biography ==
Ridenour has worked in the Defense Intelligence Agency and in The Pentagon. He is a life member of the Veterans of Foreign Wars organization. He served in the United States Marine Corps from 1980 to 2000. He earned a bachelor's degree from Purdue University in 1980, a graduate degree from the University of Oklahoma in 2000, and a graduate degree from the Marine Corps War College in 2017. He is a Lutheran.
