= Marty Gearheart =

American politician (born 1961)

Member of the West Virginia House of Delegates from the 27th district
- Incumbent
- Assumed office December 1, 2020
- In office December 1, 2012 – December 1, 2018
- Succeeded by: Eric Porterfield

Member of the West Virginia House of Delegates from the 24th district
- In office November 2, 2010 – December 2012
- Preceded by: Bill Cole
- Succeeded by: Ted Tomblin; Rupie Phillips

Personal details
- Born: September 15, 1961 (age 65) Zebulon, North Carolina, U.S.
- Party: Republican
- Education: Concord University
- Website: martygearheart.wordpress.com

Gary Martin 'Marty' Gearheart (born September 15, 1961, in Zebulon, North Carolina) is an American politician and a Republican member of the West Virginia House of Delegates representing District 27 since January 12, 2013. Gearheart served consecutively from November 2, 2010, until January 2013 in the District 24 seat.

== Education ==
Gearheart earned his BS in education from Concord University.

== Elections ==
- 2012 Redistricted to District 27, Gearheart ran in the three-way May 8, 2012 Republican primary and placed third by 65 votes with 1,516 votes (32.4%), and placed third in the six-way November 6, 2012 general election with 9,333 votes (18.8%) behind former Senator John Shott and Republican nominee Joe Ellington and ahead of Democratic nominees Ryan Flanigan, Greg Ball, and Bill Morefield, who had run for a District 25 seat in 2006 and 2010.
- 2010 To challenge incumbent Democratic United States Representative Nick Rahall in West Virginia's 3rd congressional district, Gearheart ran in the four-way Republican primary but lost to Elliot Maynard, who lost the November 2, general election to Congressman Rahall.
- 2010 District 24 Republican Representative John Shott was unopposed in the May 11, 2010 Republican primary, but was appointed to the West Virginia Senate to fill a vacancy; Gearheart replaced him on the ballot for the November 2, 2010 general election, and won unopposed with 2,797 votes.
