= Michael Hite =

American politician (born 1966)

Member of the West Virginia House of Representatives from the 92nd district
- Incumbent
- Assumed office December 1, 2022

Personal details
- Born: July 8, 1966 (age 60) Martinsburg, West Virginia, U.S.
- Party: Republican
- Spouse: Pamla
- Children: 4
- Occupation: Business Owner

Michael Hite (born July 8, 1966) is an American politician serving as a member of the West Virginia House of Delegates from the 92nd district.
