= West Virginia House of Delegates =

Lower house of the West Virginia Legislature

Coordinates: 38°20′9.8″N 81°36′41.5″W

- 87th West Virginia Legislature

Type
- Type: Lower house of the West Virginia Legislature
- Term limits: None

History
- New session started: January 8, 2025

Leadership
- Speaker: Roger Hanshaw (R) since August 29, 2018
- Speaker pro tempore: Matthew Rohrbach (R) since January 8, 2025
- Majority Leader: Pat McGeehan (R) since January 8, 2025
- Minority Leader: Sean Hornbuckle (D) since August 8, 2023

Structure
- Seats: 100
- Political groups: Majority Republican (91) Minority Democratic (9)
- Length of term: 2 years
- Authority: Article VI, West Virginia Constitution
- Salary: $20,000/year + per diem

Elections
- Voting system: Plurality voting in single-member districts
- Last election: November 5, 2024
- Next election: November 3, 2026
- Redistricting: Legislative Control

Meeting place
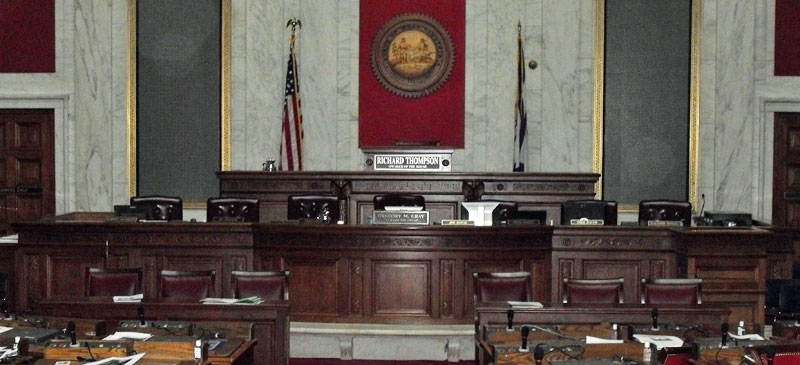
- House of Delegates Chamber; West Virginia State Capitol; Charleston, West Virginia

Website
- www.wvlegislature.gov

The West Virginia House of Delegates is the lower house of the West Virginia Legislature in West Virginia. Only three states—Maryland, Virginia, and West Virginia—refer to their lower legislative chambers as "houses of delegates."

== Organization ==
Regular sessions begin with an organizational day on the second Wednesday of January of each year. The length of regular session is limited to 60 calendar days. The governor can call for special sessions.

Delegates are elected for terms of two years.

== Legislative process ==
Delegates submit bill proposals to the Office of Legislative Services or legislative staff counsel, who draft the bill. Once the bill draft is approved by the delegate, it is submitted for introduction. Bills then undergo committee review and three readings in the house of origin and then the other house of the state legislature.

An unusual feature of the West Virginia legislative process is that revenue bills can originate in either house. The state constitution also prohibits multiple subjects in a single bill.

If approved by both the West Virginia House of Delegates and the West Virginia Senate, bills are submitted to the governor, who may sign them into law or veto them. State legislators can override the governor's veto of bills with a simple majority vote of both houses, unless the bill is a revenue bill, in which case two-thirds of the members elected to each house are required to override the governor's veto or line-item veto.

== Membership ==
=== Composition ===
| Affiliation | Party (Shading indicates majority caucus) | | | Total | Vacant |
| Affiliation | Democratic | Republican | Independent | Total | Vacant |
|---|---|---|---|---|---|
| 81st Legislature Begin | 54 | 46 | 0 | 100 | 0 |
| 81st Legislature End | 53 | 47 | 0 | 100 | 0 |
| 82nd Legislature | 36 | 64 | 0 | 100 | 0 |
| 83rd Legislature Start | 36 | 63 | 1 | 100 | 0 |
| 83rd Legislature End | 36 | 64 | 0 | 100 | 0 |
| 84th Legislature Start | 41 | 59 | 0 | 100 | 0 |
| 84th Legislature End | 41 | 58 | 1 | 100 | 0 |
| 85th Legislature Start | 24 | 76 | 0 | 100 | 0 |
| 85th Legislature End | 22 | 78 | 0 | 100 | 0 |
| 86th Legislature Start | 12 | 88 | 0 | 100 | 0 |
| 86th Legislature End | 11 | 89 | 0 | 100 | 0 |
| 87th Legislature Start | 9 | 91 | 0 | 100 | 0 |
| Latest voting share | 9% | 91% | | | |

== District organization ==
The House is composed of 100 members elected for two-year terms.

Prior to the 1970 Census, districts always respected county lines, with each district consisting of either a single entire county, or several entire counties. Following the redistricting cycle of the 1970 census, the state began to use smaller geographic areas.

Following the 2010 Census, the legislature was required to redistrict, with the Democratic Party in control. The Republican Party, and groups from the growing eastern panhandle and Putnam County, were among those calling for 100 single member districts. The state was divided into 67 districts, of which 47 were one-member districts, 11 two-member districts, 6 three-member districts, 2 four-member districts, and 1 five-member district. The five-member district, covering most of Monongalia County, remained among the ten largest multi-member lower house districts in the country.

In response to the 2020 Census, the legislature was again required to redistrict, this time with the Republican Party in control. The legislature abandoned the practice of multi-member districts and divided the state into 100 single member districts. Each district contains about 1/100 of the state's population, or about 17,500 persons. These changes took effect with the 2022 election.

== Speaker ==
The Speaker of the House is selected by its members. In contrast to the tradition of the Speaker of the United States House of Representatives, the Speaker must vote unless excused. The House rules state that in some cases, the speaker is not required to vote unless the House is equally divided, or unless the speaker's vote, if given to the minority, will make the division equal. In the latter case, the question is lost.

== Members ==
=== 87th Legislature party leadership ===
| Position | Name | Party | District | County |
|---|---|---|---|---|
| Speaker of the House | Roger Hanshaw | Republican | 62nd | Clay |
| Speaker pro tempore | Matthew Rohrbach | Republican | 98th | Cabell |
| Majority Leader | Pat McGeehan | Republican | 1st | Brooke, Hancock |
| Minority Leader | Sean Hornbuckle | Democratic | 25th | Cabell |
| Majority Whip | Marty Gearheart | Republican | 37th | Mercer |
| Minority Whip | Shawn Fluharty | Democratic | 5th | Ohio |

=== Committee chairs ===
| Committee | Chair | Minority Chair |
|---|---|---|
| Education | Joe Ellington | Anitra Hamilton |
| Energy and Public Works | Bill Anderson | Evan Hansen |
| Finance | Vernon Criss | John Williams |
| Government Organization | Chris Phillips | Kayla Young |
| Health and Human Resources | Evan Worrell | Mike Pushkin |
| Judiciary | JB Akers | Shawn Fluharty |
| Rules | Roger Hanshaw | Vacant |

=== Current members ===
| District | Name | Party | Start | Residence | Counties |
|---|---|---|---|---|---|
| 1 | Pat McGeehan | Republican | 2014 | Chester | Brooke, Hancock |
| 2 | Mark Zatezalo | Republican | 2020 | Weirton | Brooke, Hancock |
| 3 | Jimmy Willis | Republican | 2022 | Wellsburg | Brooke, Ohio |
| 4 | Shane Stack | Republican | 2026 | Triadelphia | Ohio |
| 5 | Shawn Fluharty | Democratic | 2014 | Wheeling | Ohio |
| 6 | Jeffrey Stephens | Republican | 2023 | Wheeling | Marshall |
| 7 | Charles Sheedy | Republican | 2022 | Cameron | Marshall, Wetzel |
| 8 | Bill Bell | Republican | 2025 | Paden City | Doddridge, Tyler, Wetzel |
| 9 | Betsy Kelly | Republican | 2026 | Pennsboro | Pleasants, Ritchie, Tyler |
| 10 | Bill Anderson | Republican | 1992 | Williamstown | Wood |
| 11 | Bob Fehrenbacher | Republican | 2022 | Vienna | Wood |
| 12 | Vernon Criss | Republican | 2016 | Parkersburg | Wood |
| 13 | Scot Heckert | Republican | 2022 | Parkersburg | Wood |
| 14 | Dave Foggin | Republican | 2022 | Belleville | Wirt, Wood |
| 15 | Erica Moore | Republican | 2023 | Spencer | Roane, Wirt |
| 16 | Joe Parsons | Republican | 2025 | Ripley | Jackson |
| 17 | Jonathan Pinson | Republican | 2020 | Point Pleasant | Jackson, Mason |
| 18 | Jim Butler | Republican | 2022 | Gallipolis Ferry | Mason, Putnam |
| 19 | Kathie Hess Crouse | Republican | 2021 | Buffalo | Putnam |
| 20 | Sarah Drennan | Republican | 2025 | Winfield | Putnam |
| 21 | Jarred Cannon | Republican | 2022 | Hurricane | Putnam |
| 22 | Aaron Holley | Republican | 2026 | Milton | Cabell |
| 23 | Evan Worrell | Republican | 2018 | Barboursville | Cabell |
| 24 | Patrick Lucas | Republican | 2022 | Barboursville | Cabell |
| 25 | Sean Hornbuckle | Democratic | 2014 | Huntington | Cabell |
| 26 | Matthew Rohrbach | Republican | 2014 | Huntington | Cabell |
| 27 | Michael Amos | Republican | 2025 | Kenova | Cabell, Wayne |
| 28 | Ryan Browning | Republican | 2024 | Kenova | Wayne |
| 29 | Henry Dillon | Republican | 2022 | Fort Gay | Mingo, Wayne |
| 30 | Jeff Eldridge | Republican | 2025 | Alum Creek | Lincoln |
| 31 | Margitta Mazzocchi | Republican | 2020 | Chapmanville | Boone, Lincoln, Logan |
| 32 | Josh Holstein | Republican | 2020 | Ashford | Boone |
| 33 | Jordan Bridges | Republican | 2020 | Logan | Logan |
| 34 | Mark Dean | Republican | 2016 | Gilbert | McDowell, Mingo |
| 35 | Adam Vance | Republican | 2022 | Brenton | Wyoming |
| 36 | David Green | Republican | 2024 | McDowell | McDowell |
| 37 | Marty Gearheart | Republican | 2020 | Bluefield | Mercer |
| 38 | Joe Ellington | Republican | 2010 | Princeton | Mercer |
| 39 | Doug Smith | Republican | 2020 | Princeton | Mercer |
| 40 | Roy Cooper | Republican | 2012 | Wayside | Monroe, Summers |
| 41 | Jordan Maynor | Republican | 2021 | Beaver | Mercer, Raleigh, Summers |
| 42 | John Jordan | Republican | 2026 | Beckley | Raleigh |
| 43 | Chris Toney | Republican | 2018 | Beckley | Raleigh, Wyoming |
| 44 | Bill Roop | Republican | 2024 | Beckley | Raleigh |
| 45 | Eric Brooks | Republican | 2022 | Mount Hope | Fayette, Raleigh |
| 46 | Jeff Campbell | Republican | 2023 | Lewisburg | Pocahontas, Greenbrier |
| 47 | Ray Canterbury | Republican | 2025 | Ronceverte | Greenbrier, Monroe |
| 48 | Gregory Watt | Republican | 2025 | Hacker Valley | Greenbrier, Nicholas, Webster |
| 49 | Stanley Adkins | Republican | 2025 | Summersville | Nicholas |
| 50 | William Vest | Republican | 2026 | Oak Hill | Fayette |
| 51 | Marshall Clay | Republican | 2025 | Fayetteville | Fayette |
| 52 | Tresa Howell | Republican | 2025 | Winifrede | Kanawha |
| 53 | Tristan Leavitt | Republican | 2025 | Charleston | Kanawha |
| 54 | Mike Pushkin | Democratic | 2014 | Charleston | Kanawha |
| 55 | JB Akers | Republican | 2024 | Charleston | Kanawha |
| 56 | Kayla Young | Democratic | 2020 | South Charleston | Kanawha |
| 57 | Hollis Lewis | Democratic | 2023 | Charleston | Kanawha |
| 58 | Walter Hall | Republican | 2022 | St. Albans | Kanawha |
| 59 | Andy Shamblin | Republican | 2022 | Nitro | Kanawha |
| 60 | Dana Ferrell | Republican | 2020 | Sissonville | Kanawha |
| 61 | Dean Jeffries | Republican | 2018 | Elkview | Kanawha |
| 62 | Roger Hanshaw | Republican | 2014 | Wallback | Calhoun, Clay, Gilmer |
| 63 | Lori Dittman | Republican | 2022 | Gassaway | Braxton, Gilmer |
| 64 | Adam Burkhammer | Republican | 2020 | Horner | Lewis, Upshur |
| 65 | Carl Martin | Republican | 2018 | Buckhannon | Upshur |
| 66 | Jonathan Kyle | Republican | 2025 | Beverly | Pocahontas, Randolph |
| 67 | Elias Coop-Gonzalez | Republican | 2022 | Elkins | Pendleton, Randolph |
| 68 | Chris Phillips | Republican | 2018 | Buckhannon | Barbour, Upshur |
| 69 | Keith Marple | Republican | 2022 | Lost Creek | Harrison, Lewis |
| 70 | Mickey Petitto | Republican | 2022 | Clarksburg | Harrison |
| 71 | Laura Kimble | Republican | 2020 | Bridgeport | Harrison |
| 72 | Clay Riley | Republican | 2020 | Shinnston | Harrison, Wetzel |
| 73 | Bryan Smith | Republican | 2025 | Grafton | Marion, Taylor |
| 74 | Guy Ward | Republican | 2026 | | Marion |
| 75 | Phil Mallow | Republican | 2020 | Fairmont | Marion |
| 76 | Rick Garcia | Democratic | 2025 | Fairmont | Marion |
| 77 | Joe Statler | Republican | 2020 | Core | Monongalia, Wetzel |
| 78 | Geno Chiarelli | Republican | 2022 | Morgantown | Monongalia |
| 79 | Evan Hansen | Democratic | 2018 | Morgantown | Monongalia |
| 80 | John Williams | Democratic | 2016 | Morgantown | Monongalia |
| 81 | Anitra Hamilton | Democratic | 2023 | Morgantown | Monongalia |
| 82 | David McCormick | Republican | 2025 | Morgantown | Monongalia |
| 83 | George Street | Republican | 2022 | Masontown | Preston |
| 84 | D. Rolland Jennings | Republican | 2017 | Thornton | Preston |
| 85 | John Hott | Republican | 2018 | Petersburg | Grant, Tucker |
| 86 | Bryan Ward | Republican | 2020 | Fisher | Hardy, Pendleton |
| 87 | Gary Howell | Republican | 2010 | Keyser | Mineral |
| 88 | Rick Hillenbrand | Republican | 2022 | Romney | Hampshire, Mineral |
| 89 | David Cannon | Republican | 2025 | Romney | Hampshire, Morgan |
| 90 | George Miller | Republican | 2020 | Berkeley Springs | Berkeley, Morgan |
| 91 | Ian Masters | Republican | 2025 | Berkeley | Berkeley |
| 92 | Michael Hite | Republican | 2022 | Martinsburg | Berkeley |
| 93 | Michael Hornby | Republican | 2022 | Martinsburg | Berkeley |
| 94 | Donald Bennett | Republican | 2026 | Martinsburg | Berkeley |
| 95 | Chuck Horst | Republican | 2020 | Falling Waters | Berkeley |
| 96 | Lisa White | Republican | 2025 | Inwood | Berkeley |
| 97 | S. Chris Anders | Republican | 2025 | Martinsburg | Berkeley, Jefferson |
| 98 | Joe Funkhouser | Republican | 2024 | Charles Town | Jefferson |
| 99 | Wayne Clark | Republican | 2020 | Charles Town | Jefferson |
| 100 | William Ridenour | Republican | 2022 | Harpers Ferry | Jefferson |

== See also ==
- List of speakers of the West Virginia House of Delegates
- List of West Virginia state legislatures
