= 2012 West Virginia House of Delegates election =

- November 6, 2012

All 100 seats in the West Virginia House of Delegates 51 seats needed for a majority
	Majority party	Minority party
Leader	Rick Thompson	Tim Armstead
Party	Democratic	Republican
Leader since	January 14, 2009	January 12, 2011
Leader's seat	19th district	40th district
Last election	65 seats	35 seats
Seats before	65	35
Seats won	54	46
Seat change	▼11	▲11
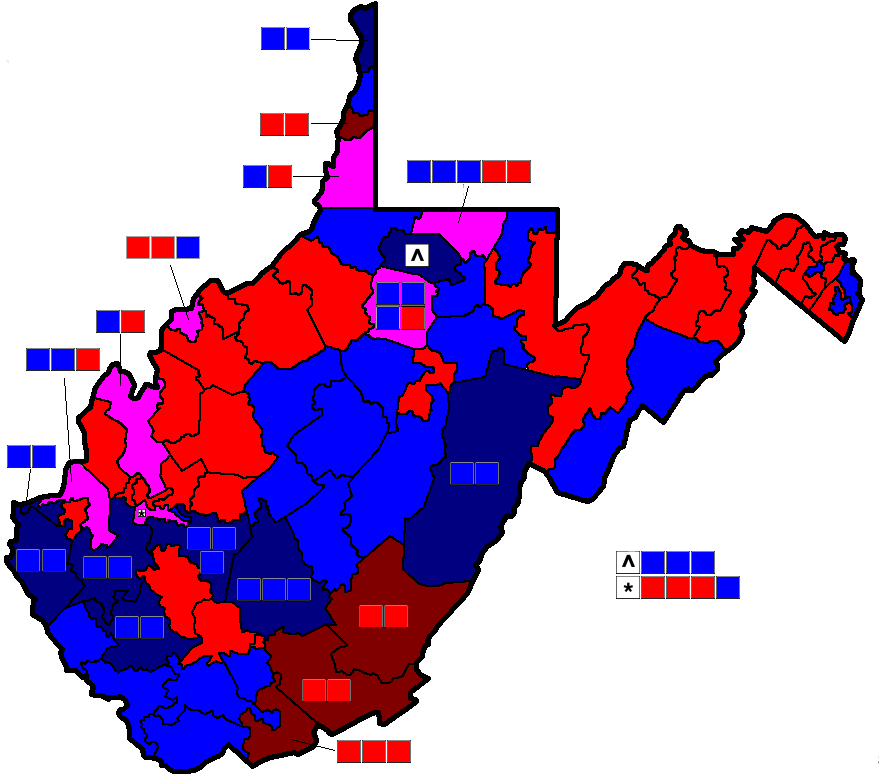
- District colors: Democratic (1+) Republican (1+) Democratic (1) Republican (1) Split delegation
Speaker before election
Rick Thompson
Democratic
Elected Speaker
Rick Thompson
Democratic

Elections to the West Virginia House of Delegates took place on November 6, 2012. The election was held alongside elections for US president, US Senate, US House, State Senate, Governor, Secretary of State and Commissioner of Agriculture.

== Retirements ==
=== Democratic ===
- District 2: Roy Givens
- District 2: Virginia Mahan
- District 4: Scott Varner
- District 19: Greg Butcher
- District 19: Ralph Rodighiero
- District 22: Daniel Hall
- District 25: John Frazier
- District 26: Gerald Crosier
- District 28: Thomas Campbell
- District 47: Harold Michael
- District 57: John Doyle

=== Republican ===
- District 12: Mitch Carmichael
- District 14: Brian Savilla
- District 27: Rick Snuffer
- District 35: Harold "Pete" Sigler
- District 53: Jonathan Miller

== Results by district ==
=== District 1 ===
Two members were elected in District 1.

==== Primary ====
Democratic primary results
Party	Candidate	Votes	%
Democratic	Randy Swartzmiller	3,968	
Democratic	Ronnie Jones	2,530	
Democratic	Marilyn Boyd	2,281	
Total votes		8,779	100.0

Republican primary results
Party	Candidate	Votes	%
Republican	Carl Thompson	1,444	
Republican	Justin Bull	954	
Total votes		2,398	100.0

==== General election ====
West Virginia's 1st House of Delegates district, 2012
Party	Candidate	Votes	%
Democratic	Randy Swartzmiller (incumbent)	9,059	
Democratic	Ronnie Jones (incumbent)	7,128	
Republican	Carl Thompson	5,134	
Republican	Justin Bull	3,655	
Total votes			100.0

=== District 2 ===
One member was elected in District 2. Incumbent Democrat Roy Givens did not seek re-election.

==== Primary ====
Democratic primary results
Party	Candidate	Votes	%
Democratic	Phil Diserio	3,022	
Total votes			100.0

Republican primary results
Party	Candidate	Votes	%
Republican	Lynn Davis	718	
Total votes			100.0

==== General election ====
West Virginia's 2nd House of Delegates district, 2012
Party	Candidate	Votes	%
Democratic	Phil Diserio (incumbent)	3,440	52.05
Republican	Lynn Davis	3,170	47.95
Total votes		6,610	100.0

=== District 3 ===
Two members were elected in District 3.

==== Primary ====
Democratic primary results
Party	Candidate	Votes	%
Democratic	Shawn Fluharty	2,981	
Democratic	Ryan Ferns	2,149	
Total votes			100.0

Republican primary results
Party	Candidate	Votes	%
Republican	Erikka Lynn Storch	3,009	
Republican	Larry Tighe	733	
Total votes		2,398	100.0

==== General election ====
West Virginia's 3rd House of Delegates district, 2012
Party	Candidate	Votes	%
Republican	Erikka Lynn Storch (incumbent)	10,705	37.64
Democratic	Ryan Ferns (incumbent)	7,431	26.13
Democratic	Shawn Fluharty	7,151	25.15
Republican	Larry Tighe	3,150	11.07
Total votes		28,437	100.0

=== District 4 ===
Two members were elected in District 4. Incumbent Democrat Scott Varner did not seek re-election.

==== Primary ====
Democratic primary results
Party	Candidate	Votes	%
Democratic	Michael Ferro	3,383	
Democratic	David Sidiropolis	2,571	
Democratic	Keith Hughes	1,749	
Democratic	R.J. Smith	493	
Total votes		8,196	100.0

Republican primary results
Party	Candidate	Votes	%
Republican	David Evans	2,157	
Total votes		2,157	100.0

==== General election ====
West Virginia's 4th House of Delegates district, 2012
Party	Candidate	Votes	%
Democratic	Michael Ferro (incumbent)	8,697	39.1%
Republican	David Evans	6,927	31.2%
Democratic	David Sidiropolis	6,610	29.7%
Total votes		15,624	100.0

=== District 5 ===
One member was elected in District 5.

==== Primary ====
Democratic primary results
Party	Candidate	Votes	%
Democratic	Dave Pethtel	2,856	
Total votes		2,856	100.0

Mountain Party primary results
Party	Candidate	Votes	%
Mountain	Raymond V. Davis, III	4	
Total votes			

Constitution Party primary results
Party	Candidate	Votes	%
Constitution	Denzil W. Sloan		
Total votes			

==== General election ====
West Virginia's 5th House of Delegates district, 2012
Party	Candidate	Votes	%
Democratic	Dave Pethtel (incumbent)	4,596	80.74%
Mountain	Raymond V. Davis, III	761	13.37%
Constitution	Denzil W. Sloan	335	5.88%
Total votes		5,692	100.0

=== District 6 ===
One member was elected in District 6.

==== Primary ====
Democratic primary results
Party	Candidate	Votes	%
Democratic	Charlie Delauder	534	
Democratic	Karl Paul	283	
Total votes			100.0

Republican primary results
Party	Candidate	Votes	%
Republican	William Romine	2,171	
Total votes			100.0

==== General election ====
West Virginia's 6th House of Delegates district, 2012
Party	Candidate	Votes	%
Republican	William Romine	4,028	67.52%
Democratic	Charlie Delauder	1,938	32.48%
Total votes		5,966	100.0

=== District 7 ===
One member was elected in District 7.

==== Primary ====
Republican primary results
Party	Candidate	Votes	%
Republican	Lynwood Ireland	1,885	100%
Total votes		1,885	100.0

==== General election ====
West Virginia's 1st House of Delegates district, 2012
Party	Candidate	Votes	%
Republican	Lynwood Ireland (incumbent)	5,356	100%
Total votes		5,356	100.0

=== District 8 ===
One member was elected in District 8.

==== Primary ====
Democratic primary results
Party	Candidate	Votes	%
Democratic	Denzil Malone	918	100.0
Total votes		918	100.0

Republican primary results
Party	Candidate	Votes	%
Republican	Bill Anderson	1,531	
Republican	Bob Buchanan	-	
Total votes			100.0

==== General election ====
West Virginia's 8th House of Delegates district, 2012
Party	Candidate	Votes	%
Republican	Bill Anderson (incumbent)	4,842	66.78%
Democratic	Denzil Malone	1,778	24.52%
Independent	Bob Buchanan	630	8.68%
Total votes		7,250	100.0

=== District 9 ===
One member was elected in District 9.

==== Primary ====
Democratic primary results
Party	Candidate	Votes	%
Democratic	Jim Marion	1,434	
Total votes		1,434	100.0

Republican primary results
Party	Candidate	Votes	%
Republican	Anna Border	1,468	
Total votes		1,468	100.0

==== General election ====
West Virginia's 9th House of Delegates district, 2012
Party	Candidate	Votes	%
Republican	Anna Border (incumbent)	4,504	65.65%
Democratic	Jim Marion	2,357	34.35%
Total votes		6,861	100.0

=== District 10 ===
Three members were elected in District 10.

==== Primary ====
Democratic primary results
Party	Candidate	Votes	%
Democratic	Daniel Poling	3,962	
Total votes		3,962	100.0

Republican primary results
Party	Candidate	Votes	%
Republican	John Ellem	3,379	35.66%
Republican	Tom Azinger	3,355	35.41%
Republican	Frederick Gillespie	2,740	28.92%
Total votes		9,474	100.0

==== General election ====
West Virginia's 10th House of Delegates district, 2012
Party	Candidate	Votes	%
Republican	Tom Azinger (incumbent)	12,955	27.06%
Republican	John Ellem (incumbent)	12,801	26.73%
Democratic	Daniel Poling (incumbent)	11,844	24.73%
Republican	Frederick Gillespie	10,280	21.47%
Total votes		47,880	100.0

=== District 11 ===
One member was elected in District 11.

==== Primary ====
Republican primary results
Party	Candidate	Votes	%
Republican	Bob Ashley	1,475	
Total votes		1,475	100.0

Mountain Party primary results
Party	Candidate	Votes	%
Mountain	Mark Myers	5	
Total votes		5	100.0

==== General election ====
West Virginia's 11th House of Delegates district, 2012
Party	Candidate	Votes	%
Republican	Bob Ashley	4,699	81.13%
Mountain	Mark Myers	1,093	18.87%
Total votes		5,792	100.0

=== District 12 ===
One member was elected in District 12. Incumbent Republican Mitch Carmichael did not seek re-election.

==== Primary ====
Democratic primary results
Party	Candidate	Votes	%
Democratic	Jo Boggess Phillips	1,565	
Total votes		1,565	100.0

Republican primary results
Party	Candidate	Votes	%
Republican	Steve Westfall	1,590	
Total votes		1,590	100.0

Mountain Party primary results
Party	Candidate	Votes	%
Mountain	Justin Johnson	7	
Total votes		7	100.0

==== General election ====
West Virginia's 12th House of Delegates district, 2012
Party	Candidate	Votes	%
Republican	Steve Westfall	3,442	49.71%
Democratic	Jo Boggess Phillips	3,131	45.22%
Mountain	Justin Johnson	351	5.07%
Total votes		6,924	100.0

=== District 13 ===
Two members were elected in District 13.

==== Primary ====
Democratic primary results
Party	Candidate	Votes	%
Democratic	Brady Paxton	2,764	
Democratic	Helen Martin	2,086	
Total votes		4,850	100.0

Republican primary results
Party	Candidate	Votes	%
Republican	Scott Cadle	1,526	
Republican	Brian Scott	1,509	
Republican	Nate Westfall	870	
Republican	Harold Landers	824	
Total votes		4,729	100.0

==== General election ====
West Virginia's 13th House of Delegates district, 2012
Party	Candidate	Votes	%
Democratic	Brady Paxton (incumbent)	6,663	27.8%
Republican	Scott Cadle	6,149	25.7%
Republican	Brian Scott	6,002	25.1%
Democratic	Helen Martin (incumbent)	5,134	21.4%
Total votes		23,948	100.0

=== District 14 ===
One member was elected in District 14. Incumbent Republican Brian Savilla did not seek re-election.

==== Primary ====
Democratic primary results
Party	Candidate	Votes	%
Democratic	Jimmie Wood, Jr.	1,058	58.52%
Democratic	Samantha Fooce	394	21.79%
Democratic	Kermit E. Beaver, Jr.	356	19.69%
Total votes		1,808	100.0

Republican primary results
Party	Candidate	Votes	%
Republican	Jim Butler	710	41.09%
Republican	John C. Casey	554	32.06%
Republican	Darrell Justin Black	464	26.85%
Total votes		1,728	100.0

==== General election ====
West Virginia's 14th House of Delegates district, 2012
Party	Candidate	Votes	%
Republican	Jim Butler	3,368	54.23%
Democratic	Jimmie Wood, Jr.	2,843	45.77%
Total votes		6,211	100.0

=== District 15 ===
One member was elected in District 15.

==== Primary ====
Republican primary results
Party	Candidate	Votes	%
Republican	Troy Andes	1,792	81.98%
Republican	Joe Bocook	394	18.02%
Total votes		2,186	100.0

==== General election ====
West Virginia's 15th House of Delegates district, 2012
Party	Candidate	Votes	%
Republican	Troy Andes (incumbent)	7,004	100.0%
Total votes			100.0

=== District 16 ===
Three members were elected in District 16.

==== Primary ====
Democratic primary results
Party	Candidate	Votes	%
Democratic	Kevin Craig	2,978	37.23%
Democratic	Jim Morgan	2,850	35.63%
Democratic	Sean Hornbuckle	2,172	27.15%
Total votes		8,000	100.0

Republican primary results
Party	Candidate	Votes	%
Republican	Carol Miller	1,745	59.62%
Republican	Mike Davis	1,182	40.38%
Total votes		2,927	100.0

==== General election ====
West Virginia's 16th House of Delegates district, 2012
Party	Candidate	Votes	%
Democratic	Kevin Craig (incumbent)	8,866	22.9%
Republican	Carol Miller (incumbent)	8,415	21.8%
Democratic	Jim Morgan (incumbent)	8,050	20.8%
Democratic	Sean Hornbuckle	7,339	19.0%
Republican	Mike Davis	6,013	15.5%
Total votes		38,683	100.0

=== District 17 ===
Two members were elected in District 17.

==== Primary ====
Democratic primary results
Party	Candidate	Votes	%
Democratic	Dale Stephens	2,280	43.08%
Democratic	Doug Reynolds	2,210	41.75%
Democratic	Robert Alexander	803	15.17%
Total votes		5,293	100.0

Republican primary results
Party	Candidate	Votes	%
Republican	Michael Ankrom	1,127	50.43%
Republican	Joyce Holland	1,108	49.57%
Total votes		2,235	100.0

==== General election ====
West Virginia's 17th House of Delegates district, 2012
Party	Candidate	Votes	%
Democratic	Doug Reynolds (incumbent)	7,198	32.91%
Democratic	Dale Stephens (incumbent)	6,559	29.99%
Republican	Michael Ankrom	4,492	20.54%
Republican	Joyce Holland	3,620	16.55%
Total votes		21,869	100.0

=== District 18 ===
One member was elected in District 18.

==== Primary ====
Democratic primary results
Party	Candidate	Votes	%
Democratic	Billy Chaffin II	682	44.00%
Democratic	Portia Warner	449	28.97%
Democratic	Joe Hutchinson	419	27.03%
Total votes		1,550	100.0

Republican primary results
Party	Candidate	Votes	%
Republican	Kelli Sobonya	1,000	100%
Total votes		1,000	100.0

==== General election ====
West Virginia's 18th House of Delegates district, 2012
Party	Candidate	Votes	%
Republican	Kelli Sobonya (incumbent)	4,624	69.35%
Democratic	Billy Chaffin II	2,044	30.65%
Total votes		6,668	100.0

=== District 19 ===
Two members were elected in District 19.

==== Primary ====
Democratic primary results
Party	Candidate	Votes	%
Democratic	Rick Thompson	3,542	53.42%
Democratic	Don Perdue	3,088	46.58%
Total votes		8,779	100.0

Republican primary results
Party	Candidate	Votes	%
Republican	Randy Tomblin	988	100.0%
Total votes		2,398	100.0

==== General election ====
West Virginia's 19th House of Delegates district, 2012
Party	Candidate	Votes	%
Democratic	Rick Thompson (incumbent)	7,623	40.7%
Democratic	Don Perdue (incumbent)	6,817	36.4%
Republican	Randy Tomblin	4,308	23.0%
Total votes		18,748	100.0

=== District 20 ===
One member was elected in District 20.

==== Primary ====
Democratic primary results
Party	Candidate	Votes	%
Democratic	Justin Marcum	2,655	58.39%
Democratic	Nathan Brown	1,622	35.67%
Democratic	Marvin Vernatter	270	5.94%
Total votes		4,547	100.0

Republican primary results
Party	Candidate	Votes	%
Republican	Mike Baisden	1,444	65.84%
Republican	Diane Shafer	43	17.70%
Republican	Phil Amick	40	16.46%
Total votes		243	100.0

==== General election ====
West Virginia's 20th House of Delegates district, 2012
Party	Candidate	Votes	%
Democratic	Justin Marcum (incumbent)	4,013	68.45%
Republican	Mike Baisden	1,850	31.55%
Total votes		5,863	100.0

=== District 21 ===
One member was elected in District 21.

==== Primary ====
Democratic primary results
Party	Candidate	Votes	%
Democratic	Harry Keith White	3,542	83.74%
Democratic	James Lusk	509	16.26%
Total votes		3,131	100.0

Republican primary results
Party	Candidate	Votes	%
Republican	Roger Stacy	222	100.0%
Total votes		222	100.0

==== General election ====
West Virginia's 21st House of Delegates district, 2012
Party	Candidate	Votes	%
Democratic	Harry Keith White (incumbent)	3,816	71.29%
Republican	Roger Stacy	1,437	26.84%
Total votes		5,253	100.0

=== District 22 ===
Two members were elected in District 22.

==== Primary ====
Democratic primary results
Party	Candidate	Votes	%
Democratic	Josh Stowers	2,774	34.64
Democratic	Jeff Eldridge	2,348	29.32
Democratic	Bill Bryant	1,128	14.09
Democratic	Gloria Triplett	879	10.98
Democratic	Ed Triplett	878	10.97
Total votes		8,007	100.0

Republican primary results
Party	Candidate	Votes	%
Republican	Michel Moffatt	1,019	57.47
Republican	Gary Johngrass	754	42.53
Total votes		1,773	100.0

==== General election ====
West Virginia's 22nd House of Delegates district, 2012
Party	Candidate	Votes	%
Democratic	Josh Stowers (incumbent)	6,232	31.2%
Democratic	Jeff Eldridge	5,262	26.3%
Republican	Michel Moffatt	4,851	24.3%
Republican	Gary Johngrass	3,637	18.2%
Total votes		19,982	100.0

=== District 23 ===
One member was elected in District 23.

==== Primary ====
Democratic primary results
Party	Candidate	Votes	%
Democratic	Larry Barker	3,309	100.0
Total votes		3,309	100.0

Republican primary results
Party	Candidate	Votes	%
Republican	Joshua Nelson	1,444	100.0
Total votes		1,444	100.0

==== General election ====
West Virginia's 23rd House of Delegates district, 2012
Party	Candidate	Votes	%
Republican	Joshua Nelson	3,985	62.38
Democratic	Larry Barker (incumbent)	2,403	37.62
Total votes		6,388	100.0

=== District 24 ===
Two members were elected in District 24.

==== Primary ====
Democratic primary results
Party	Candidate	Votes	%
Democratic	Rupie Phillips	2,917	26.2%
Democratic	Ted Tomblin	2,794	25.1%
Democratic	Harry Freeman	1,573	14.1%
Democratic	Lidella Wilson Hrutkay	1,195	10.7%
Democratic	Larry Rogers	1,189	10.7%
Democratic	Joe White	1,124	10.1%
Democratic	Chris Stratton	352	3.2%
Total votes		11,144	100.0

==== General election ====
West Virginia's 24th House of Delegates district, 2012
Party	Candidate	Votes	%
Democratic	Ted Tomblin	7,591	52.60
Democratic	Rupie Phillips	6,841	47.40
Total votes		14,432	100.0

=== District 25 ===
One member was elected in District 25. Incumbent Democrat John Frazier did not seek re-election.

==== Primary ====
Democratic primary results
Party	Candidate	Votes	%
Democratic	Linda Phillips	2,145	
Democratic	Lyle Cottle	402	
Total votes			100.0

==== General election ====
West Virginia's 25th House of Delegates district, 2012
Party	Candidate	Votes	%
Democratic	Linda Phillips (incumbent)	4,880	
Total votes			100.0

=== District 26 ===
One member was elected in District 26. Incumbent Democrat Gerald Crosier did not seek re-election.

==== Primary ====
Democratic primary results
Party	Candidate	Votes	%
Democratic	Clif Moore	1,458	48.5%
Democratic	Ed Evans	1,255	41.7%
Democratic	Edwin Ray Vanover	294	9.8%
Total votes		3,007	100.0

==== General election ====
West Virginia's 26th House of Delegates district, 2012
Party	Candidate	Votes	%
Democratic	Clif Moore (incumbent)	3,847	100.0
Total votes		3,847	100.0

=== District 27 ===
Three members were elected in District 27. Incumbents Virginia Mahan (D) and Rick Snuffer (R) did not seek re-election.

==== Primary ====
Democratic primary results
Party	Candidate	Votes	%
Democratic	Ryan Flanigan	3,217	27.6%
Democratic	Billy Morefield	2,718	23.3%
Democratic	Greg Ball	2,718	19.6%
Democratic	Stephen Akers	1,905	16.3%
Democratic	Pete Sternloff	1,541	13.2%
Total votes		11,669	100.0

Republican primary results
Party	Candidate	Votes	%
Republican	John Shott	1,586	33.87%
Republican	Joe Ellington	1,581	33.76%
Republican	Marty Gearheart	1,516	32.37%
Total votes		4,683	100.0

==== General election ====
West Virginia's 27th House of Delegates district, 2012
Party	Candidate	Votes	%
Republican	John Shott	10,998	22.2%
Republican	Joe Ellington	9,940	20.1%
Republican	Marty Gearheart	9,333	18.8%
Democratic	Ryan Flanigan	7,774	15.7%
Democratic	Greg Ball	6,003	12.1%
Democratic	Billy Morefield	5,482	11.1%
Total votes		49,530	100.0

=== District 28 ===
Two members were elected in District 28.

==== Primary ====
Democratic primary results
Party	Candidate	Votes	%
Democratic	Jeffry Pritt	2,124	35.3%
Democratic	Al Martine	1,402	23.3%
Democratic	Greg Bailey	1,385	23.0%
Democratic	Wayne Williams	1,102	18.3%
Total votes		6,013	100.0

Republican primary results
Party	Candidate	Votes	%
Republican	John O'Neal	1,341	40.9%
Republican	Roy Cooper	997	30.4%
Republican	Arnold Ryan	942	28.7%
Total votes		3,280	100.0

==== General election ====
West Virginia's 28th House of Delegates district, 2012
Party	Candidate	Votes	%
Republican	John O'Neal (incumbent)	8,189	33.15%
Republican	Roy Cooper	7,146	28.93%
Democratic	Jeffry Pritt	4,784	19.36%
Democratic	Al Martine	4,586	18.56%
Total votes		24,705	100.0

=== District 29 ===
One member was elected in District 29.

==== Primary ====
Democratic primary results
Party	Candidate	Votes	%
Democratic	Rick Moye	1,527	82.6%
Democratic	Randall Wykle	322	17.4%
Total votes		1,849	100.0%

Republican primary results
Party	Candidate	Votes	%
Republican	Ron Hedrick	671	100.0%
Total votes		671	100.05

==== General election ====
West Virginia's 29th House of Delegates district, 2012
Party	Candidate	Votes	%
Democratic	Rick Moye (incumbent)	4,049	57.96%
Republican	Ron Hedrick	2,937	42.04%
Total votes		6,986	100.0

=== District 30 ===
One member was elected in District 30.

==== Primary ====
Democratic primary results
Party	Candidate	Votes	%
Democratic	William R. Wooton	1,791	100.0
Total votes		1,791	100.0

Republican primary results
Party	Candidate	Votes	%
Republican	Linda Sumner	883	100.0
Total votes		883	100.0

==== General election ====
West Virginia's 30th House of Delegates district, 2012
Party	Candidate	Votes	%
Republican	Linda Sumner (incumbent)	3,615	49.60
Democratic	William R. Wooton	3,103	42.57
Independent	Tony Martin	571	7.83
Total votes		7,289	100.0

=== District 31 ===
One member was elected in District 31.

==== Primary ====
Democratic primary results
Party	Candidate	Votes	%
Democratic	Clyde McKnight	895	51.5
Democratic	Melvin Kessler	844	48.5
Total votes		1,739	100.0

Republican primary results
Party	Candidate	Votes	%
Republican	Lynne Arvon	715	100.0
Total votes		715	100.0

==== General election ====
West Virginia's 31st House of Delegates district, 2012
Party	Candidate	Votes	%
Republican	Lynne Arvon	2,669	58.9
Democratic	Clyde McKnight	1,866	41.1
Total votes		4,535	100.0

=== District 32 ===
Three members were elected in District 32.

==== Primary ====
Democratic primary results
Party	Candidate	Votes	%
Democratic	Margaret Anne Staggers	3,721	21.5
Democratic	David Perry	3,653	21.1
Democratic	John Pino	3,507	20.2
Democratic	Tom Louisos	3,406	19.7
Democratic	Jonathan Walkup	1,097	6.3
Democratic	William Stover	979	5.7
Democratic	Jan Lafferty	958	5.5
Total votes		17,321	100.0

Mountain Party primary results
Party	Candidate	Votes	%
Mountain	Tighe Bullock	3	100.0
Total votes		3	100.0

==== General election ====
West Virginia's 32nd House of Delegates district, 2012
Party	Candidate	Votes	%
Democratic	Margaret Anne Staggers (incumbent)	10,313	31.2
Democratic	David Perry (incumbent)	9,925	30.0
Democratic	John Pino (incumbent)	9,820	29.7
Mountain	Tighe Bullock	3,018	9.1
Total votes		33,076	100.0

=== District 33 ===
One member was elected in District 33.

==== Primary ====
Democratic primary results
Party	Candidate	Votes	%
Democratic	David Walker	2,028	61.1
Democratic	Dan Sizemore	1,292	38.9
Total votes		3,320	100.0

==== General election ====
West Virginia's 33rd House of Delegates district, 2012
Party	Candidate	Votes	%
Democratic	David Walker (incumbent)	4,575	100.0
Total votes		4,575	100.0

=== District 34 ===
One member was elected in District 34.

==== Primary ====
Democratic primary results
Party	Candidate	Votes	%
Democratic	Brent Boggs	3,110	100.0
Total votes		3,110	100.0

==== General election ====
West Virginia's 34th House of Delegates district, 2012
Party	Candidate	Votes	%
Democratic	Brent Boggs (incumbent)	4,741	100.0
Total votes		4,741	100.0

=== District 35 ===
Four members were elected in District 35. Incumbent Republican Harold Sigler did not seek re-election.

==== Primary ====
Democratic primary results
Party	Candidate	Votes	%
Democratic	Doug Skaff	4,246	19.9
Democratic	Bonnie Brown	3,982	18.7
Democratic	Barbara Hatfield	3,581	16.8
Democratic	Chris Morris	2,441	11.4
Democratic	Thornton Cooper	1,822	8.5
Democratic	Fred Giggenbach	1,625	7.6
Democratic	John Caudill	1,540	7.2
Democratic	Lisa Amoroso	1,528	7.2
Democratic	Gary Holstein	574	2.7
Total votes		21,339	100.0

Republican primary results
Party	Candidate	Votes	%
Republican	Eric Nelson	2,606	18.5
Republican	Suzette Raines	2,561	18.2
Republican	JB McCuskey	1,969	14.0
Republican	Fred Joseph	1,725	12.2
Republican	Ann Calvert	1,630	11.6
Republican	Matt Kelly	1,003	7.1
Republican	Todd Carden	811	5.8
Republican	Michael Young	752	5.3
Republican	Micah Phelps	665	4.7
Republican	Elias Gregory	368	2.6
Total votes		14,090	100.0

==== General election ====
West Virginia's 35th House of Delegates district, 2012
Party	Candidate	Votes	%
Democratic	Doug Skaff (incumbent)	14,891	15.8
Republican	Suzette Raines	13,676	14.5
Republican	Eric Nelson (incumbent)	13,397	14.2
Republican	JB McCuskey	11,325	12.0
Democratic	Barbara Hatfield (incumbent)	11,284	12.0
Democratic	Bonnie Brown (incumbent)	11,097	11.8
Democratic	Chris Morris	9,792	10.4
Republican	Fred Joseph	8,638	9.2
Total votes		94,100	100.0

=== District 36 ===
Three members were elected in District 36. Incumbent Democrat Joseph Talbott ran for re-election in District 44.

==== Primary ====
Democratic primary results
Party	Candidate	Votes	%
Democratic	Danny Wells	2,878	20.7
Democratic	Mark Hunt	2,834	20.4
Democratic	Nancy Peoples Guthrie	2,825	20.3
Democratic	Sharon Spencer	2,406	17.3
Democratic	Bob Johns	1,196	8.6
Democratic	Diana Lynn Wilson	1,173	8.4
Democratic	Ronald Baskin	584	4.2
Total votes		13,896	100.0

Republican primary results
Party	Candidate	Votes	%
Republican	Robin Holstein	1,296	
Republican	Steve Sweeney	1,087	
Republican	Stevie Thaxton	1,071	
Total votes			100.0

==== General election ====
West Virginia's 36th House of Delegates district, 2012
Party	Candidate	Votes	%
Democratic	Mark Hunt (incumbent)	9,325	19.7
Democratic	Danny Wells (incumbent)	9,212	19.4
Democratic	Nancy Peoples Guthrie (incumbent)	8,777	18.5
Republican	Robin Holstein	7,746	16.3
Republican	Stevie Thaxton	6,315	13.3
Republican	Steve Sweeney	6,039	12.7
Total votes		47,414	100.0

=== District 37 ===
One member was elected in District 37. Incumbent Democrats William G. Hartman and Denise L. Campbell ran for re-election in District 43. Meshea Poore was redistricted from District 31.

==== Primary ====
Democratic primary results
Party	Candidate	Votes	%
Democratic	Meshea Poore	1,494	100.0
Total votes		1,494	100.0

Mountain Party primary results
Party	Candidate	Votes	%
Mountain	Derrick Westly Shaffer	2	100.0
Total votes		2	100.0

==== General election ====
West Virginia's 37th House of Delegates district, 2012
Party	Candidate	Votes	%
Democratic	Meshea Poore (incumbent)	4,583	
Mountain	Derrick Westly Shaffer	646	
Total votes			100.0

=== District 38 ===
One member was elected in District 38.

==== Primary ====
Democratic primary results
Party	Candidate	Votes	%
Democratic	Ginny Moles	1,093	100.0
Total votes		1,093	100.0

Republican primary results
Party	Candidate	Votes	%
Republican	Patrick Lane	1,273	100.0
Total votes		1,273	100.0

==== General election ====
West Virginia's 38th House of Delegates district, 2012
Party	Candidate	Votes	%
Republican	Patrick Lane (incumbent)	5,084	
Democratic	Justin Bull	2,832	
Total votes			100.0

=== District 39 ===
One member was elected in District 39.

==== Primary ====
Democratic primary results
Party	Candidate	Votes	%
Democratic	Clint Casto	851	100.0
Total votes		851	100.0

Republican primary results
Party	Candidate	Votes	%
Republican	Ron Walters	909	100.0
Total votes		909	100.0

==== General election ====
West Virginia's 39th House of Delegates district, 2012
Party	Candidate	Votes	%
Republican	Ron Walters (incumbent)	4,149	65
Democratic	Clint Casto	2,230	35
Total votes		6,379	100.0

=== District 40 ===
One member was elected in District 40.

==== Primary ====
Republican primary results
Party	Candidate	Votes	%
Republican	Tim Armstead	1,048	100.0
Total votes		1,048	100.0

==== General election ====
West Virginia's 40th House of Delegates district, 2012
Party	Candidate	Votes	%
Republican	Tim Armstead (incumbent)	5,769	100.0
Total votes		5,769	100.0

=== District 41 ===
One member was elected in District 41.

==== Primary ====
Democratic primary results
Party	Candidate	Votes	%
Democratic	Adam Young	1,469	53
Democratic	Jeff Asbury	1,302	47
Total votes		2,771	100.0

Republican primary results
Party	Candidate	Votes	%
Republican	Jordan Hill	783	100.0
Total votes		783	100.0

==== General election ====
West Virginia's 41st House of Delegates district, 2012
Party	Candidate	Votes	%
Democratic	Adam Young	3,390	52.6
Republican	Jordan Hill	3,056	47.4
Total votes			100.0

=== District 42 ===
Two members were elected in District 42.

==== Primary ====
Democratic primary results
Party	Candidate	Votes	%
Democratic	Steve Hunter	2,401	31.1
Democratic	Glenn Singer	2,313	29.9
Democratic	E. Lavoyd Morgan	1,644	21.3
Democratic	Peter Bostic	1,367	17.7
Total votes		7,725	100.0

Republican primary results
Party	Candidate	Votes	%
Republican	Ray Canterbury	1,652	54.7
Republican	George Ambler	792	26.2
Republican	Marcie Easton	577	19.1
Total votes		3,021	100.0

==== General election ====
West Virginia's 42nd House of Delegates district, 2012
Party	Candidate	Votes	%
Republican	Ray Canterbury (incumbent)	7,831	32.7
Republican	George Ambler	5,556	23.2
Democratic	Steve Hunter	5,405	22.5
Democratic	Glenn Singer	5,190	21.6
Total votes		23,982	100.0

=== District 43 ===
Two members were elected in District 43.

==== Primary ====
Democratic primary results
Party	Candidate	Votes	%
Democratic	Denise L. Campbell	4,255	41.5
Democratic	William G. Hartman	3,240	31.6
Democratic	Phil Isner	2,748	26.8
Total votes		10,243	100.0

Republican primary results
Party	Candidate	Votes	%
Republican	Donna Auvil	1,761	100.0
Total votes		1,761	100.0

==== General election ====
West Virginia's 43rd House of Delegates district, 2012
Party	Candidate	Votes	%
Democratic	Denise L. Campbell (incumbent)	8,729	41.2
Democratic	William G. Hartman (incumbent)	7,243	34.2
Republican	Donna Auvil	5,210	24.6
Total votes		23,982	21,182

=== District 44 ===
One member was elected in District 44.

==== Primary ====
Democratic primary results
Party	Candidate	Votes	%
Democratic	Dana Lynch	1,339	37.8
Democratic	Joseph Talbott (incumbent)	1,170	33.1
Democratic	Sue Blake Andersen	1,032	29.1
Total votes		3,541	100.0

Republican primary results
Party	Candidate	Votes	%
Republican	Robert Karnes	484	58.7
Republican	Duane Borchers Sr.	341	41.3
Total votes		825	100.0

==== General election ====
West Virginia's 44th House of Delegates district, 2012
Party	Candidate	Votes	%
Democratic	Dana Lynch	9,059	
Republican	Robert Karnes	3,655	
Total votes			100.0

=== District 45 ===
One member was elected in District 45.

==== Primary ====
Republican primary results
Party	Candidate	Votes	%
Republican	Bill Hamilton	2,490	100.0
Total votes		2,490	100.0

==== General election ====
West Virginia's 45th House of Delegates district, 2012
Party	Candidate	Votes	%
Republican	Bill Hamilton (incumbent)	5,669	100.0
Total votes			100.0

=== District 46 ===
One member was elected in District 46.

==== Primary ====
Democratic primary results
Party	Candidate	Votes	%
Democratic	Margaret Smith	2,125	100.0
Total votes		2,125	100.0

==== General election ====
West Virginia's 46th House of Delegates district, 2012
Party	Candidate	Votes	%
Democratic	Margaret Smith (incumbent)	5,670	100.0
Total votes		5,670	100.0

=== District 47 ===
One member was elected in District 47. Incumbent Democrat Harold Michael did not seek re-election.

On October 30, 2012, John Rose was killed inspecting damage caused by Hurricane Sandy, but his name remained on the ballot.

==== Primary ====
Democratic primary results
Party	Candidate	Votes	%
Democratic	Mary Poling	1,971	100.0
Total votes		1,971	100.0

Republican primary results
Party	Candidate	Votes	%
Republican	John Rose	1,353	100.0
Total votes		1,353	100.0

==== General election ====
West Virginia's 47th House of Delegates district, 2012
Party	Candidate	Votes	%
Democratic	Mary Poling (incumbent)	3,612	54.7
Republican	John Rose	2,987	45.3
Total votes		6,599	100.0

=== District 48 ===
Two members were elected in District 48.

==== Primary ====
Democratic primary results
Party	Candidate	Votes	%
Democratic	Tim Miley	5,809	22.7
Democratic	Ron Fragale	5,728	22.4
Democratic	Richard Iaquinta	5,727	22.4
Democratic	Sam Cann	5,233	20.5
Democratic	Martin Shaffer	3,050	11.9
Total votes		25,547	100.0

Republican primary results
Party	Candidate	Votes	%
Republican	Danny Hamrick	2,984	26.7
Republican	Diana Bartley	2,431	21.8
Republican	Terry Woodside	1,444	18.6
Republican	Ed Randolph	1,929	17.3
Republican	Dan Franklin	1,746	15.6
Total votes		11,170	100.0

==== General election ====
West Virginia's 48th House of Delegates district, 2012
Party	Candidate	Votes	%
Democratic	Tim Miley (incumbent)	13,318	14.9
Democratic	Richard Iaquinta (incumbent)	12,633	14.1
Democratic	Sam Cann (incumbent)	12,302	13.7
Republican	Danny Hamrick	12,096	13.5
Democratic	Ron Fragale (incumbent)	11,877	13.3
Republican	Diana Bartley	9,705	10.8
Republican	Terry Woodside	9,432	10.5
Republican	Ed Randolph	8,148	9.1
Total votes		89,511	100.0

=== District 49 ===
One member was elected in District 49.

==== Primary ====
Democratic primary results
Party	Candidate	Votes	%
Democratic	Mike Manypenny	3,968	72.2
Democratic	Francis Nestor	695	27.8
Total votes		2,496	100.0

Republican primary results
Party	Candidate	Votes	%
Republican	Jeff Tansill	1,115	100.0
Total votes		1,115	100.0

==== General election ====
West Virginia's 49th House of Delegates district, 2012
Party	Candidate	Votes	%
Democratic	Mike Manypenny (incumbent)	3,453	53.1
Republican	Jeff Tansill	3,047	46.9
Total votes		6,500	100.0

=== District 50 ===
Three members were elected in District 50.

==== Primary ====
Democratic primary results
Party	Candidate	Votes	%
Democratic	Mike Caputo	6,775	29.9
Democratic	Linda Longstreth	6,171	27.2
Democratic	Tim Manchin	5,895	26.0
Democratic	Richard Garcia	3,814	16.8
Total votes		22,655	100.0

Republican primary results
Party	Candidate	Votes	%
Republican	Barry Bledsoe	1,885	57.40
Republican	Lynette Kennedy Mcquain	1,399	42.60
Total votes		3,284	100.0

==== General election ====
West Virginia's 50th House of Delegates district, 2012
Party	Candidate	Votes	%
Democratic	Mike Caputo	13,149	25.0
Democratic	Linda Longstreth	12,117	23.1
Democratic	Tim Manchin	11,782	22.4
Republican	Barry Bledsoe	8,851	16.8
Republican	Lynette Kennedy Mcquain	6,659	12.7
Total votes		52,558	100.0

=== District 51 ===
Five members were elected in District 51.

==== Primary ====
Democratic primary results
Party	Candidate	Votes	%
Democratic	Charlene Marshall	5,358	25.07
Democratic	Barbara Fleischauer	5,226	24.45
Democratic	Anthony Barill	4,414	20.65
Democratic	Billy Smerka	3,189	14.92
Democratic	Nancy Jamison	3,188	14.91
Total votes		21,375	100.0

Republican primary results
Party	Candidate	Votes	%
Republican	Cindy Frich	2,969	21.9
Republican	Amanda Pasdon	2,453	18.1
Republican	Kevin Scott Poe	2,240	16.5
Republican	John P. Woods	1,698	12.5
Republican	Jay Redmond	1,623	12.0
Republican	Michael Castle	1,602	11.8
Republican	Elvis Austin	958	7.1
Total votes		13,543	100.0

==== General election ====
West Virginia's 51st House of Delegates district, 2012
Party	Candidate	Votes	%
Democratic	Charlene Marshall (incumbent)	15,078	12.0
Republican	Cindy Frich	14,677	11.6
Democratic	Barbara Fleischauer (incumbent)	14,381	11.4
Republican	Amanda Pasdon (incumbent)	13,542	10.7
Democratic	Anthony Barill (incumbent)	13,188	10.5
Republican	Kevin Scott Poe	11,535	9.2
Democratic	Nancy Jamison	11,112	8.8
Democratic	Billy Smerka	11,067	8.8
Republican	John P. Woods	10,388	8.2
Republican	Jay Redmond	9,907	7.9
Independent	Harry Bertram	1,110	0.9
Total votes		125,985	100.0

=== District 52 ===
One member was elected in District 52.

==== Primary ====
Democratic primary results
Party	Candidate	Votes	%
Democratic	Larry Williams	1,021	100.0
Total votes		1,021	100.0

==== General election ====
West Virginia's 52nd House of Delegates district, 2012
Party	Candidate	Votes	%
Democratic	Larry Williams (incumbent)	3,967	80.4
Constitution	John Bartlett	965	19.6
Total votes		4,932	100.0

=== District 53 ===
One member was elected in District 53. Incumbent Republican Jonathan Miller did not seek re-election.

==== Primary ====
Democratic primary results
Party	Candidate	Votes	%
Democratic	Stan Shaver	1,657	100.0
Total votes		1,657	100.0

Republican primary results
Party	Candidate	Votes	%
Republican	Randy Smith	1,485	100.0
Total votes		1,485	100.0

==== General election ====
West Virginia's 53rd House of Delegates district, 2012
Party	Candidate	Votes	%
Republican	Randy Smith	4,059	57.5
Democratic	Stan Shaver (incumbent)	2,994	42.5
Total votes		7,053	100.0

=== District 54 ===
One member was elected in District 54.

==== Primary ====
Republican primary results
Party	Candidate	Votes	%
Republican	Allen V. Evans	2,165	100.0
Total votes		2,165	100.0

==== General election ====
West Virginia's 54th House of Delegates district, 2012
Party	Candidate	Votes	%
Republican	Allen V. Evans (incumbent)	6,323	100.0
Total votes		6,323	100.0

=== District 55 ===
One member was elected in District 55.

==== Primary ====
Democratic primary results
Party	Candidate	Votes	%
Democratic	Isaac Sponaugle	2,247	56.4
Democratic	John Hamilton Treadway, Jr.	1,735	43.6
Total votes		3,982	100.0

Republican primary results
Party	Candidate	Votes	%
Republican	Stephen G. Smith	828	100.0
Total votes		828	100.0

==== General election ====
West Virginia's 55th House of Delegates district, 2012
Party	Candidate	Votes	%
Democratic	Isaac Sponaugle	4,316	58.8
Republican	Stephen G. Smith	3,025	41.2
Total votes		7,341	100.0

=== District 56 ===
One member was elected in District 56.

==== Primary ====
Democratic primary results
Party	Candidate	Votes	%
Democratic	Jim Maybury	1,116	100.0
Total votes		1,116	100.0

Republican primary results
Party	Candidate	Votes	%
Republican	Gary G. Howell	1,075	67.9
Republican	Robert "Bob" Harman	508	32.1
Total votes		1,583	100.0

==== General election ====
West Virginia's 56th House of Delegates district, 2012
Party	Candidate	Votes	%
Republican	Gary G. Howell (incumbent)	4,506	62.7
Democratic	Jim Maybury	2,676	37.3
Total votes		7,182	100.0

=== District 57 ===
One member was elected in District 57. Incumbent Democrat John Doyle did not seek re-election.

==== Primary ====
Democratic primary results
Party	Candidate	Votes	%
Democratic	Joe Moreland, Jr.	1,442	100.0
Total votes		1,442	100.0

Republican primary results
Party	Candidate	Votes	%
Republican	Ruth Rowan	1,088	68.9
Republican	Terry L. Craver	490	31.1
Total votes		1,578	100.0

==== General election ====
West Virginia's 57th House of Delegates district, 2012
Party	Candidate	Votes	%
Republican	Ruth Rowan (incumbent)	4,419	71.0
Democratic	Joe Moreland, Jr.	1,808	29.0
Total votes		6,227	100.0

=== District 58 ===
One member was elected in District 58.

==== Primary ====
Republican primary results
Party	Candidate	Votes	%
Republican	Daryl Cowles	1,405	100.0
Total votes		1,405	100.0

==== General election ====
West Virginia's 58th House of Delegates district, 2012
Party	Candidate	Votes	%
Republican	Daryl Cowles (incumbent)	5,699	100.0
Total votes		5,699	100.0

=== District 59 ===
One member was elected in District 59.

==== Primary ====
Republican primary results
Party	Candidate	Votes	%
Republican	Larry Kump	1,249	100.0
Total votes		1,249	100.0

==== General election ====
West Virginia's 59th House of Delegates district, 2012
Party	Candidate	Votes	%
Republican	Larry Kump (incumbent)	6,023	100.0
Total votes		6,023	100.0

=== District 60 ===
One member was elected in District 60.

==== Primary ====
Republican primary results
Party	Candidate	Votes	%
Republican	Larry Faircloth	1,444	54.1
Republican	Gary W. Kelley	583	45.9
Total votes		1,269	100.0

==== General election ====
West Virginia's 60th House of Delegates district, 2012
Party	Candidate	Votes	%
Republican	Larry Faircloth	5,448	100.0
Total votes		5,448	100.0

=== District 61 ===
One member was elected in District 61.

==== Primary ====
Democratic primary results
Party	Candidate	Votes	%
Democratic	Jason Barrett	914	100.0
Total votes		914	100.0

Republican primary results
Party	Candidate	Votes	%
Republican	Walter Duke	899	100.0
Total votes		899	100.0

==== General election ====
West Virginia's 61st House of Delegates district, 2012
Party	Candidate	Votes	%
Democratic	Jason Barrett	3,270	52.7
Republican	Walter Duke (incumbent)	2,936	47.3
Total votes		6,206	100.0

=== District 62 ===
One member was elected in District 62.

==== Primary ====
Republican primary results
Party	Candidate	Votes	%
Republican	John Overington	848	100.0
Total votes		848	100.0

==== General election ====
West Virginia's 62nd House of Delegates district, 2012
Party	Candidate	Votes	%
Republican	John Overington (incumbent)	5,024	100.0
Total votes		5,024	100.0

=== District 63 ===
One member was elected in District 63.

==== Primary ====
Democratic primary results
Party	Candidate	Votes	%
Democratic	Donn Marshall	578	100.0
Total votes		578	100.0

Republican primary results
Party	Candidate	Votes	%
Republican	Michael Folk	485	51.4
Republican	Pam Brush	458	48.6
Total votes		943	100.0

==== General election ====
West Virginia's 63rd House of Delegates district, 2012
Party	Candidate	Votes	%
Republican	Michael Folk	3,096	51.2
Democratic	Donn Marshall	2,947	48.8
Total votes		6,043	100.0

=== District 64 ===
One member was elected in District 64.

==== Primary ====
Republican primary results
Party	Candidate	Votes	%
Republican	Eric Householder	888	100.0
Total votes		888	100.0

==== General election ====
West Virginia's 64th House of Delegates district, 2012
Party	Candidate	Votes	%
Republican	Eric Householder (incumbent)	4,882	100.0
Total votes		4,882	100.0

=== District 65 ===
One member was elected in District 65.

==== Primary ====
Democratic primary results
Party	Candidate	Votes	%
Democratic	Tiffany Lawrence	860	79.6
Democratic	Richard Shuman, II	220	20.4
Total votes		1,080	100.0

Republican primary results
Party	Candidate	Votes	%
Republican	Jill Upson	575	100.0
Total votes		575	100.0

==== General election ====
West Virginia's 65th House of Delegates district, 2012
Party	Candidate	Votes	%
Democratic	Tiffany Lawrence (incumbent)	3,593	52.1
Republican	Jill Upson	3,307	47.9
Total votes		6,900	100.0

=== District 66 ===
Two members were elected in District 66.

==== Primary ====
Democratic primary results
Party	Candidate	Votes	%
Democratic	John Reese Maxey	749	100.0
Total votes		749	100.0

Republican primary results
Party	Candidate	Votes	%
Republican	Paul Espinosa	763	100.0
Total votes		763	100.0

==== General election ====
West Virginia's 66th House of Delegates district, 2012
Party	Candidate	Votes	%
Republican	Paul Espinosa	4,233	59.6
Democratic	John Reese Maxey	2,875	40.4
Total votes		7,108	100.0

=== District 67 ===
One member was elected in District 67.

==== Primary ====
Democratic primary results
Party	Candidate	Votes	%
Democratic	Stephen Skinner	1,215	100.0
Total votes		1,215	100.0

Republican primary results
Party	Candidate	Votes	%
Republican	Elliot Simon	534	67.9
Republican	W. Matthew Harris	253	32.1
Total votes		787	100.0

==== General election ====
West Virginia's 67th House of Delegates district, 2012
Party	Candidate	Votes	%
Democratic	Stephen Skinner (incumbent)	4,160	54.8
Republican	Elliot Simon	3,437	45.2
Total votes		7,597	100.0

== See also ==
- 2012 West Virginia elections
