= Daniel Hall (West Virginia politician) =

American politician (born 1974)

Member of the West Virginia Senate from the 9th district
- In office December 1, 2012 – January 3, 2016
- Preceded by: Richard Browning
- Succeeded by: Sue Cline

Member of the West Virginia House of Delegates from the 22nd district
- In office December 1, 2008 – December 1, 2012
- Preceded by: Richard Browning

Personal details
- Born: July 26, 1974 (age 52) Beckley, West Virginia, U.S.
- Party: Republican (before 2008; after 2014)
- Other political affiliations: Democratic (2008–2014)
- Education: Southern West Virginia Community and Technical College; Marshall University (B.A.)
- Website: danielhallwv.com

Daniel Jackson Hall (born July 26, 1974) is an American politician and a Republican member of the West Virginia Senate representing District 9 between 2012 and 2016. Hall served consecutively in the West Virginia Legislature from December 1, 2008, until December 1, 2012, in the West Virginia House of Delegates in a District 22 seat. He joined the Republican Party on November 5, 2014, to give Republicans control of the Senate in the January 2015 session.

== Education ==
Hall attended Southern West Virginia Community and Technical College and earned his B.A. from Marshall University.

== Elections ==
- 2012 Hall challenged incumbent Senator Richard Browning in the May 8, 2012 Democratic Primary, winning with 5,303 votes (51.0%), and won the November 6, 2012 General election with 18,502 votes (53.7%) against Republican nominee Epp Cline.
- 2006 Initially in House District 27, when incumbent Democratic Delegates Robert S. Kiss retired and Sally Susman ran for West Virginia Senate leaving two district seats open, Hall ran as a Republican in the eight-way five-selectee 2006 Republican Primary but did not place; in the ten-way five-position November 7, 2006 General election, incumbent Delegates Virginia Mahan (D), Linda Sumner (R), and Ron Thompson (D), and Democratic nominees Mel Kessler (who had run for the seat in 2002) and Rick Moye.
- 2008 Running in District 22, when Delegate Richard Browning ran for West Virginia Senate and left a district seat open, Hall placed second in the six-way May 13, 2008 Democratic Primary with 2,263 votes (18.0%) which displaced Delegate Mike Burdiss, who placed fourth; the frontrunners were unopposed for the November 4, 2008 General election and Hall placed second with 5,887 votes (46.3%) behind fellow challenger Linda Phillips.
- 2010 Hall and Delegate Phillips were unopposed for the May 11, 2010 Democratic Primary where Hall placed second with 1,957 votes (45.2%), and placed second in the three-way two-position November 2, 2010 General election with 3,713 votes (34.1%) behind Delegate Phillips (D) and ahead of Republican nominee Shawn Spears.
