= 2012 West Virginia Senate election =

2012 West Virginia Senate elections
- November 6, 2012

17 of 34 seats in the West Virginia Senate 18 seats needed for a majority
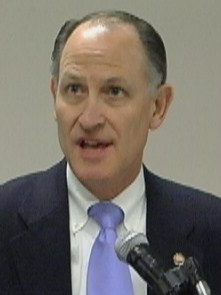

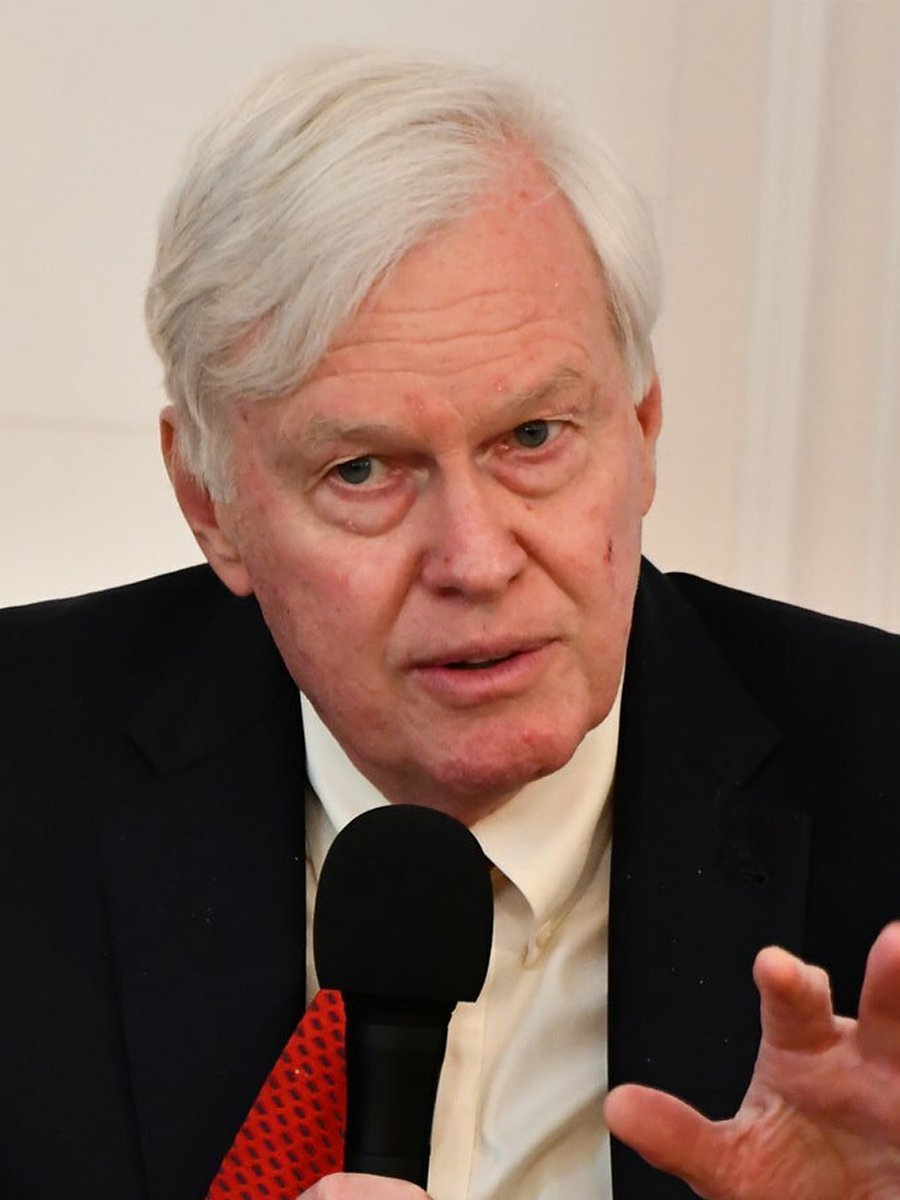
	Majority party	Minority party
Leader	Jeff Kessler	Mike Hall
Party	Democratic	Republican
Leader since	2010	2010
Leader's seat	SD 2	SD 4
Seats before	28	6
Seats after	25	9
Seat change	▼3	▲3
Popular vote	352,746	219,193
Percentage	61.7%	38.3%
Seats up	14	3
Seats won	11	6

Holds and gains
Democratic gain Democratic hold
Republican hold
Democratic
50–60%
60–70%
>90%
Republican
50–60%
60–70%
70–80%
80–90%
>90%
Senate President before election
Jeff Kessler
Democratic
Elected Senate President
Jeff Kessler
Democratic

The 2012 West Virginia Senate election took place on Tuesday, November 6, 2012, to elect members to the 81st and 82nd Legislatures; held concurrently with the presidential, U.S. House, U.S. Senate, State House, and gubernatorial elections. State senate seats in West Virginia are staggered, with senators serving 4-year terms. 17 of the 34 state senate seats were up for election. While Republican candidate for president Mitt Romney won the state in the presidential election by over 26 points, the Democratic Party won over 60% of the vote for state senate candidates, though they lost 3 seats. As of 2023, this is the last state senate election in which Democrats won a majority of seats.

== Predictions ==
Source	Ranking	As of
Governing	Likely D	October 24, 2012

== Results ==
Summary of the 2012 West Virginia Senate election results
Party	Candidates	Votes	%	Seats				
Party	Candidates	Votes	%	Before 80th Leg.	Up	Won	After 81th Leg.	+/–
Democratic	16	352,746	61.7	28	14	11	25	▼3
Republican	11	219,193	38.3	6	3	6	9	▲3
Total		571,939	100%	34	17		34	Steady

Popular vote
Democratic	61.7%
Republican	38.3%

Seats won
Democratic	64.7%
Republican	35.3%

Total senate seats
Democratic	73.5%
Republican	26.5%

== SD 1 ==
2012 West Virginia SD 1 general election
Party	Candidate	Votes	%
Democratic	Jack Yost (incumbent)	22,642	57.4
Republican	Pat McGeehan	16,833	42.6
Total votes		39,475	100.0
Democratic hold			

== SD 2 ==
2012 West Virginia SD 2 general election
Party	Candidate	Votes	%
Democratic	Jeffrey V. Kessler (incumbent)	29,422	100.0
Total votes		29,422	100.0
Democratic hold			

== SD 3 ==
2012 West Virginia SD 3 general election
Party	Candidate	Votes	%
Republican	Donna Boley (incumbent)	33,458	100.0
Total votes		33,458	100.0
Republican hold			

== SD 4 ==
2012 West Virginia SD 4 general election
Party	Candidate	Votes	%
Republican	Mitch Carmichael	20,951	52.7
Democratic	Mike Bright	18,815	47.3
Total votes		39,766	100.0
Republican hold			

== SD 5 ==
2012 West Virginia SD 5 general election
Party	Candidate	Votes	%
Democratic	Robert Plymale (incumbent)	28,090	100.0
Total votes		28,090	100.0
Democratic hold			

== SD 6 ==
Mark Wills was redistricted from the 10th district after the 2010 Census.

2012 West Virginia SD 6 general election
Party	Candidate	Votes	%
Republican	Bill Cole	28,090	63.3
Democratic	Mark Wills (incumbent)	16,307	36.7
Total votes		44,397	100.0
Republican gain from Democratic			

== SD 7 ==
2012 West Virginia SD 7 general election
Party	Candidate	Votes	%
Democratic	Art Kirkendoll	25,955	100.0
Total votes		25,955	100.0
Democratic hold			

== SD 8 ==
2012 West Virginia SD 8 general election
Party	Candidate	Votes	%
Republican	Chris Walters	19,242	52.8
Democratic	Joshua Martin	17,184	47.2
Total votes		36,426	100.0
Republican gain from Democratic			

== SD 9 ==
2012 West Virginia SD 9 general election
Party	Candidate	Votes	%
Democratic	Daniel Hall	18,502	53.7
Republican	Epp Cline	15,970	46.3
Total votes		34,472	100.0
Democratic hold			

== SD 10 ==
William Laird IV was redistricted from the 11th district after the 2010 Census.

2012 West Virginia SD 10 general election
Party	Candidate	Votes	%
Democratic	William Laird IV (incumbent)	26,819	100.0
Total votes		26,819	100.0
Democratic hold			

== SD 11 ==
Clark Barnes was redistricted from the 15th district after the 2010 Census.

2012 West Virginia SD 11 general election
Party	Candidate	Votes	%
Republican	Clark Barnes (incumbent)	24,571	65.5
Democratic	Margaret Beckwith	12,941	34.5
Total votes		37,512	100.0
Republican gain from Democratic			

== SD 12 ==
2012 West Virginia SD 12 general election
Party	Candidate	Votes	%
Democratic	Douglas Facemire (incumbent)	29,173	100.0
Total votes		29,173	100.0
Democratic hold			

== SD 13 ==
2012 West Virginia SD 13 general election
Party	Candidate	Votes	%
Democratic	Roman W. Prezioso, Jr. (incumbent)	23,211	63.1
Republican	Casey Mayer	13,549	36.9
Total votes		36,760	100.0
Democratic hold			

== SD 14 ==
2012 West Virginia SD 14 general election
Party	Candidate	Votes	%
Democratic	Bob Williams (incumbent)	27,690	100.0
Total votes		27,690	100.0
Democratic hold			

== SD 15 ==
2012 West Virginia SD 15 general election
Party	Candidate	Votes	%
Republican	Craig Blair	28,766	80.8
Democratic	Daniel Litten	6,847	19.2
Total votes		35,613	100.0
Republican hold			

== SD 16 ==
2012 West Virginia SD 16 general election
Party	Candidate	Votes	%
Democratic	Herb Snyder (incumbent)	20,764	53.9
Republican	Jim Ruland	17,763	46.1
Total votes		38,527	100.0
Democratic hold			

== SD 17 ==
Corey Palumbo was redistricted from the 8th district after the 2010 Census.

2012 West Virginia SD 17 general election
Party	Candidate	Votes	%
Democratic	Corey Palumbo (incumbent)	28,384	100.0
Total votes		28,384	100.0
Democratic hold			

== See also ==
- 2012 United States presidential election in West Virginia
- 2012 United States Senate election in West Virginia
- 2012 United States House of Representatives elections in West Virginia
- 2012 West Virginia gubernatorial election
