= Helen Martin (politician) =

American politician

Member of the West Virginia House of Representatives from the 13th district
- In office 2011–2012
- Preceded by: Dale Martin

Personal details
- Party: Democratic
- Spouse: Dale Martin

Helen Martin is an American politician from West Virginia. She was a Democrat and represented District 13 in the West Virginia House of Delegates. She was appointed to succeed her husband Dale Martin who died in office. She was defeated at the 2012 election. Their son Joshua Martin stood for District 8 of the West Virginia State Senate in 2012 and District 13 of the West Virginia House of Delegates in 2014.
