= 2012 West Virginia Commissioner of Agriculture election =

- November 6, 2012

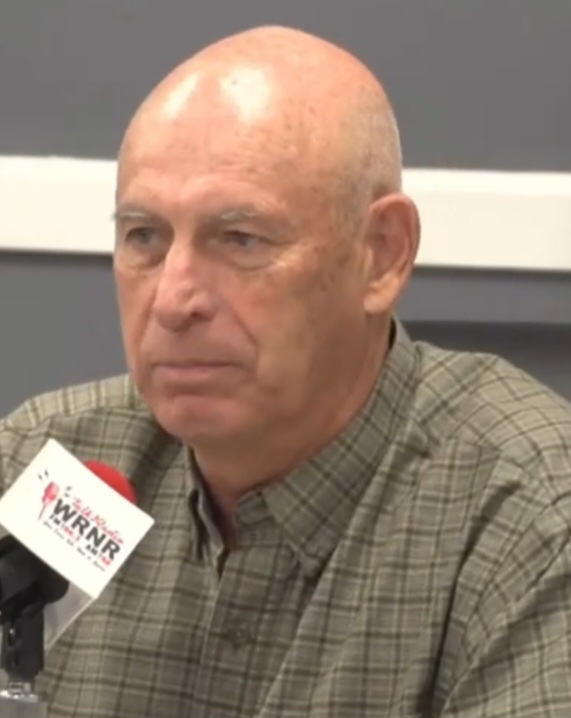
Nominee	Walt Helmick	Kent Leonhardt
Party	Democratic	Republican
Popular vote	316,591	297,088
Percentage	51.59%	48.41%
- Helmick: 50–60% 60–70% 70–80% Leonhardt: 50–60% 60–70%
Commissioner of Agriculture before election
Gus Douglass
Democratic
Elected Commissioner of Agriculture
Walt Helmick
Democratic

The 2012 West Virginia Commissioner of Agriculture election was held on November 6, 2012, to elect the West Virginia Commissioner of Agriculture, concurrently with the 2012 U.S. presidential election, as well as elections to the United States Senate, U.S. House of Representatives, governor, and other state and local elections. Primary elections were held on May 8, 2012.

Incumbent Democratic commissioner Gus Douglass, the longest serving agriculture commissioner in U.S. history, opted not to seek re-election to an eleventh term in office. Democratic state senator Walt Helmick won the open seat over Republican candidate Kent Leonhardt. Helmick later lost re-election in 2016 in a rematch with Leonhardt.

== Democratic primary ==
=== Candidates ===
==== Nominee ====
- Walt Helmick, state senator from the 15th district (1994–present) and 12th district (1990–1994)

==== Eliminated in primary ====
- Joe Messineo, farmer
- Steve Miller, assistant agriculture commissioner
- Sally Shepherd, farmer and former waste authority director for Kanawha County
- Bob Tabb, deputy commissioner of the West Virginia Department of Agriculture

==== Declined ====
- Gus Douglass, incumbent commissioner of agriculture (1993–present, 1965–1989) (endorsed Miller)

=== Endorsements ===
Walt Helmick

Local officials

- Mike Teets, commissioner of Hardy County and nominee for commissioner of agriculture in 2008 (Republican)
Steve Miller

Statewide officials

- Gus Douglass, West Virginia Commissioner of Agriculture (1993–present, 1965–1989)

=== Results ===
Democratic primary results
Party	Candidate	Votes	%
Democratic	Walt Helmick	59,376	32.89
Democratic	Sally Shepherd	44,454	24.62
Democratic	Steve Miller	39,130	21.67
Democratic	Joe Messineo	24,613	13.63
Democratic	Bob Tabb	12,976	7.19
Total votes		180,549	100.0

== Republican primary ==
=== Candidates ===
==== Nominee ====
- Kent Leonhardt, former Marine Corps lieutenant colonel

==== Withdrew ====
- Mike Teets, commissioner of Hardy County and nominee for commissioner of agriculture in 2008 (endorsed Helmick)

== General election ==
=== Post-primary endorsements ===
Walt Helmick (D)

Labor unions

- United Mine Workers of America

Newspapers and other media

- The Charleston Gazette
- The Herald-Dispatch

Organizations

- West Virginia Chamber of Commerce
- Friends of Coal
- NRA Political Victory Fund
- West Virginia Sheriffs' Association
Kent Leonhardt (R)

Organizations

- West Virginia Farm Bureau

=== Results ===
2012 West Virginia Commissioner of Agriculture election
Party	Candidate	Votes	%
Democratic	Walt Helmick	316,591	51.59
Republican	Kent Leonhardt	297,088	48.41
Total votes		613,679	100.0
Democratic hold			

==== By congressional district ====
Helmick won two of three congressional districts, including one that elected a Republican.

District	Helmick	Leonhardt	Representative
1st	46%	54%	David McKinley
2nd	53%	47%	Shelley Moore Capito
3rd	57%	43%	Nick Rahall
