= Linda Sumner =

American politician (born 1951)

Member of the West Virginia House of Delegates from the 30th district
- In office January 12, 2013 – December 1, 2014
- Preceded by: Eric Nelson
- Succeeded by: Mick Bates

Member of the West Virginia House of Delegates from the 27th district
- In office January 2003 – January 2013
- Preceded by: Warren McGraw

Personal details
- Born: December 1, 1951 (age 74) Beckley, West Virginia, U.S.
- Party: Republican
- Education: Morris Harvey College; West Virginia University

Linda S. Sumner (born December 1, 1951) is an American politician who was a Republican member of the West Virginia House of Delegates representing District 30 from January 12, 2013 to 2014. Sumner served consecutively from January 2003 until January 2013 in a District 27 seat.

== Education ==
Sumner earned her BA from Morris Harvey College (now the University of Charleston) and her MA from West Virginia University.

== Elections ==
- 2012 Redistricted to District 30 with fellow District 27 incumbent Democratic Representative Bill Wooten, and with the District 30 incumbents redistricted to Districts 35 and 36, Sumner was unopposed for the May 8, 2012, Republican Primary, winning with 883 votes, and won the three-way November 6, 2012, General election with 3,615 votes (49.6%) against Representative Wooten and Independent candidate Tony Martin.
- 2002 To challenge District 27's five incumbent Democratic Representatives, Sumner ran in the five-way 2002 Republican Primary and was elected in the ten-way five-position November 5, 2002, General election alongside Democratic incumbents Robert S. Kiss, Virginia Mahan, Sally Susman, and Ron Thompson, and unseating Representative Warren McGraw (D).
- 2004 Sumner was challenged in the eight-way 2004 Republican Primary, but placed, and was re-elected in the ten-way five-position November 2, 2004, General election.
- 2006 When Representative Susman ran for West Virginia Senate and Kiss retired leaving two district seats open, Sumner was challenged in the eight-way 2006 Republican Primary and was re-elected in the ten-way five-position November 7, 2006, General election alongside incumbents Mahan (D) and Thompson (D) and Democratic nominees Mel Kessler and Rick Moye.
- 2008 Sumner was challenged in the six-way May 13, 2008, Republican Primary, where she placed first with 3,155 votes (25.5%), and placed first in the ten-way five-position November 4, 2008, General election with 17,218 votes (13.4%) ahead of incumbent Moye (D), returning Representative Bill Wooten (D), incumbents Susman (D) and Mahan (D), Democratic nominee Louis Gall, and Republican nominees Jeffrey Pack, Dereck Severt, Philip Stevens, and Albert Honaker.
- 2010 Sumner placed first in the four-way May 11, 2010, Republican Primary with 2,091 votes (30.2%), and placed first in the nine-way five-position November 2, 2010, General election with 13,784 votes (14.3%) ahead of Republican nominee Rick Snuffer, incumbent Moye (D), Republican nominee John O'Neal, incumbent Wooten (D), unseating Democratic incumbents Susman, Kessler, and Mahan, and Republican nominee Richard Franklin.
