= Rick Moye =

American politician

Member of the West Virginia House of Delegates from the 29th district
- In office January 12, 2013 – 2018
- Succeeded by: Brandon Steele

Member of the West Virginia House of Delegates from the 27th district
- In office January 2007 – January 2013

Personal details
- Born: December 4, 1956 (age 69) Beckley, West Virginia, U.S.
- Party: Democratic
- Education: Beckley College

Ricky 'Rick' Duane Moye (born December 4, 1956) is an American politician who was a Democratic member of the West Virginia House of Delegates representing District 29 from January 12, 2013 to 2018. Moye served consecutively from January 2007 until January 2013 in the District 27 seat.

== Education ==
Moye attended Beckley College (later Mountain State University, since closed).

== Elections ==
- 2012 Redistricted to District 29, Moye and returning 2006 Republican opponent Ron Hedrick both won their May 8, 2012, primaries, setting up a rematch; Moye won the November 6, 2012, General election with 4,049 votes (58.0%) against Hedrick, who had also run for the District 27 seat in 2004.
- 2006 When District 27 incumbent Democratic Representatives Robert S. Kiss retired and Sally Susman ran for West Virginia Senate leaving two district seats open, Moye placed in the ten-way five-selectee 2006 Democratic Primary and was elected in the ten-way five-position November 7, 2006, General election along with incumbent Representatives Virginia Mahan (D), Linda Sumner (R), and Ron Thompson (D), and Democratic nominee Mel Kessler, who had run for the seat in 2002.
- 2008 When Representative Kessler ran for West Virginia Governor and left a seat open, Moye placed third in the ten-way May 13, 2008, Democratic Primary with 7,941 votes (12.8%), and placed second in the ten-way five-position November 4, 2008, General election with 15,918 votes (12.3%) behind incumbent Representative Sumner (R) and ahead of former state Senator Bill Wooten (D) and Representatives Susman (D) and Mahan (D), and non-selectees Louis Gall (D), Jeffrey Pack (R), Dereck Severt (R), Philip Stevens (R) and Albert Honaker (R).
- 2010 Moye placed first in the six-way May 11, 2010, Democratic Primary with 4,346 votes (19.5%), and placed third in the nine-way five-position November 2, 2010, General election with 11,644 votes (15.1%) behind Representatives Sumner (R) and Republican nominee Rick Snuffer and ahead of Republican nominee John O'Neal and Representative Wooten (D), and non-selectees former Representative Susman (D), unseating Representatives Kessler (D) and Mahan (D), and Republican nominee Richard Franklin.
