= Belinda Biafore =

American politician

Chair of the West Virginia Democratic Party
- In office February 7, 2015 – June 18, 2022
- Preceded by: Larry Puccio
- Succeeded by: Mike Pushkin

Personal details
- Born: January 17, 1957 (age 68)
- Political party: Democratic
- Education: Fairmont State University (BS)

Belinda Biafore (born January 17, 1957) was as the chairwoman of the West Virginia Democratic Party for February 2015-June 2022.

According to her colleagues, Biafore has been handing out Democratic campaign pamphlets since the third grade. She attended Fairmont Senior High School and Fairmont State College. She served as chairwoman of the Marion County Democratic Party, and was vice chair of the West Virginia Democratic Party from 2005 to 2015.

After party chairman Larry Puccio stepped down to chair Joe Manchin's Country Roads PAC, Biafore was selected as chair by the party's executive committee. She was reelected by the state convention in 2016, despite a challenge by vice chair Chris Regan. She was also reelected in 2020.

Biafore served as a pledged delegate for John Kerry at the 2004 Democratic National Convention. In 2008, 2016, and 2020, Biafore served as a superdelegate; she endorsed Clinton in 2008 and 2016.

Party political offices
Preceded by Larry Puccio	Chair of the West Virginia Democratic Party; 2015–2022	Succeeded by Mike Pushkin
