= Dale Martin (West Virginia politician) =

American politician (1951–2011)

Member of the West Virginia House of Delegates from the 13th district
- In office 2000 – May 3, 2011
- Succeeded by: Helen Martin

Personal details
- Born: September 9, 1951
- Died: May 3, 2011 (aged 59)
- Party: Democratic
- Spouse: Helen Martin
- Education: Poca High School
- Alma mater: West Virginia State College

Dale F. Martin (September 9, 1951 – May 3, 2011) was an American politician from West Virginia. He was a Democrat and represented District 13 in the West Virginia House of Delegates. He died in office. His widow Helen Martin was appointed by Governor Tomblin to replace him.
