= Heather Tully =

American politician (born 1980)

Member of the West Virginia House of Delegates from the 49th district
- In office December 1, 2022 – December 1, 2024
- Preceded by: Amy Summers
- Succeeded by: Stanley Adkins

Member of the West Virginia House of Delegates from the 41st district
- In office June 17, 2020 – 2022
- Preceded by: Jordan Hill

Personal details
- Born: Heather Glasko; February 6, 1980 (age 46) Olean, New York, U.S.
- Party: Republican
- Spouse: Lawrence V. Tully
- Children: 2
- Education: University of Charleston (BSN); West Virginia University (MSN)

Heather Tully (born February 6, 1980) is an American politician and nurse who was a member of the West Virginia House of Delegates. She was appointed by Governor Jim Justice on June 17, 2020.

== Early life and education ==
Tully was born in Olean, New York and raised in St. Albans, West Virginia, where she attended Saint Albans High School. She earned a Bachelor of Science in Nursing from the University of Charleston, a certificate in medical coding and billing from New River Community and Technical College, and a Master of Science in Nursing from West Virginia University.

== Career ==
After graduating from college, Tully worked as a critical care and ICU nurse. Since earning her master's degree, she has worked as a family nurse practitioner. She is a member of the West Virginia Nurses Association. Tully was appointed to the West Virginia House of Delegates in June 2020, succeeding Jordan Hill.
