= Larry Barker =

American politician (born 1946)

Member of the West Virginia House of Delegates from the 18th district
- In office 2004–2012
- Succeeded by: Joshua Nelson

Personal details
- Born: March 31, 1946 (age 80)
- Party: Democratic
- Education: Bob Jones University

Military service
- 1965-1971: West Virginia Army National Guard Sergeant

Larry W. Barker (born March 31, 1946) is an American politician from West Virginia. He was a Democrat and represented District 18 in the West Virginia House of Delegates until his defeat in 2012.
