= William G. Hartman =

American politician

Member of the West Virginia House of Delegates from the 43rd district
- In office January 12, 2013 – 2020

Member of the West Virginia House of Delegates from the 37th district
- In office January 2003 – January 2013
- Succeeded by: Meshea Poore

Personal details
- Born: April 4, 1938 (age 88) Elkins, West Virginia
- Party: Democratic
- Education: West Virginia University

William G. Hartman (born April 4, 1938) is an American politician who was a Democratic member of the West Virginia House of Delegates representing District 43 from January 12, 2013 to 2020. Hartman served consecutively from January 2003 until January 2013 in a District 37 seat.

== Education ==
Hartman earned his BA from West Virginia University.

== Elections ==
- 2012 Redistricted to District 43 with fellow District 37 incumbent Denise Campbell, and with District 43's incumbents redistricted to District 50, Hartman and Representative Campbell were challenged in the three-way May 8, 2012 Democratic Primary where Hartman placed second with 3,240 votes (31.6%), and placed second in the three-way two-position November 6, 2012 General election with 7,243 votes (34.2%), behind incumbent Representative Campbell (D), and ahead of Republican nominee Donna Auvil.
- 2002 Hartman placed in the six-way 2002 Democratic Primary and was elected in the five-way two-position November 5, 2002 General election alongside incumbent Bill Proudfoot (D).
- 2004 Hartman and Representative Proudfoot were unopposed for the 2004 Democratic Primary and were re-elected in the five-way two-position November 2, 2004 General election.
- 2006 Hartman and Representative Proudfoot were unopposed for the 2006 Democratic Primary and were re-elected in the four-way two-position November 7, 2006 General election.
- 2008 Hartman and Representative Proudfoot were challenged in the four-way May 13, 2008 Democratic Primary where Hartman placed second with 4,469 votes (30.2%); they were unopposed for the November 4, 2008 General election where Hartman placed second with 9,364 votes (48.4%).
- 2010 When Representative Proudfoot retired and left a seat open, Hartman placed first in the six-way May 11, 2010 Democratic Primary with 2,416 votes (29.2%), and placed second in the three-way two-position November 2, 2010 General election with 5,954 votes (33.7%) behind Democratic nominee Denise Campbell and ahead of Republican nominee Wilda Sharp.
