= 2012 United States House of Representatives elections in West Virginia =

- November 6, 2012

All 3 West Virginia seats to the United States House of Representatives
| | Majority party | Minority party |
|---|---|---|
| Party | Republican | Democratic |
| Last election | 2 | 1 |
| Seats won | 2 | 1 |
| Seat change | Steady | Steady |
| Popular vote | 384,253 | 257,101 |
| Percentage | 59.91% | 40.09% |
| Swing | ▲4.88% | ▼4.21% |

Republican
50–60%
60–70%
70–80%
80–90%
Democratic
50–60%
60–70%

The 2012 United States House of Representatives elections in West Virginia were held on Tuesday, November 6, 2012, to elect the three U.S. representatives from West Virginia, one from each of the state's three congressional districts. Representatives are elected for two-year terms; those elected will serve in the 113th Congress from January 2013 until January 2015. The elections coincided with the elections of other federal and state offices, including a quadrennial presidential election. A Senate election was also held on that date, during which incumbent Joe Manchin won re-election. As of 2025, this is the last time that a Democrat won a U.S. House seat in West Virginia.

== Overview ==
| District | Republican | | Democratic | | Total | | Result |
| District | Votes | % | Votes | % | Votes | % | Result |
|---|---|---|---|---|---|---|---|
| District 1 | 133,809 | 62.48% | 80,342 | 37.52% | 214,151 | 100.0% | Republican hold |
| District 2 | 158,206 | 69.77% | 68,560 | 30.23% | 226,766 | 100.0% | Republican hold |
| District 3 | 92,238 | 46.02% | 108,199 | 53.98% | 200,437 | 100.0% | Democratic hold |
| Total | 384,253 | 59.91% | 257,101 | 40.09% | 641,354 | 100.0% | |

Popular vote
| Republican | 59.91% |
| Democratic | 40.09% |

House seats
| Republican | 66.67% |
| Democratic | 33.33% |

== Redistricting ==
In August 2011, the West Virginia Legislature passed a redistricting plan which would make only minor changes to the state's congressional districts. Under the new map, Mason County is moved from the 2nd district to the 3rd district, while the 1st district is unchanged. Governor Earl Ray Tomblin signed the map into law on August 18.

== District 1 ==
2012 West Virginia's 1st congressional district election
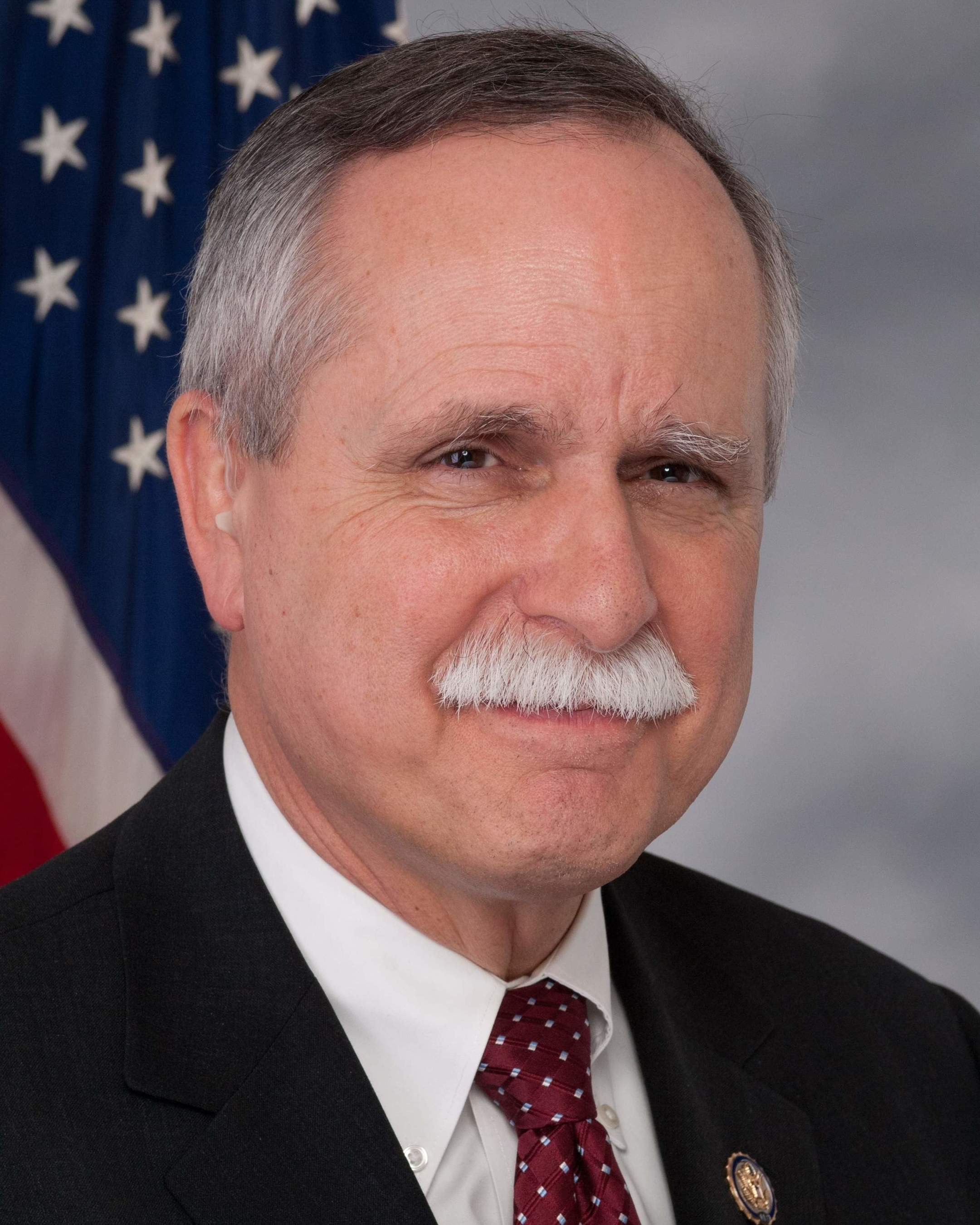

| Nominee | David McKinley | Sue Thorn |
| Party | Republican | Democratic |
| Popular vote | 133,809 | 80,342 |
| Percentage | 62.5% | 37.5% |
- County results McKinley: 50–60% 60–70% 70–80%
U.S. Representative before election
David McKinley
Republican
Elected U.S. Representative
David McKinley
Republican

Republican David McKinley, who has represented West Virginia's 1st congressional district since January 2011, ran for re-election.

=== Republican primary ===
==== Candidates ====
===== Nominee =====
- David McKinley, incumbent U.S. Representative

==== Primary results ====
Republican primary results
| Party | Candidate | Votes | % |
|---|---|---|---|
| Republican | David McKinley (incumbent) | 36,107 | 100.0 |
| Total votes | | 36,107 | 100.0 |

=== Democratic primary ===
==== Candidates ====
===== Nominee =====
- Sue Thorn, former community organizer

==== Declined ====
- Tim Manchin, state delegate and cousin of U.S. Senator Joe Manchin
- Alan Mollohan, former U.S. Representative
- Mike Oliverio, former state senator and nominee for this seat in 2010

==== Primary results ====
Democratic primary results
| Party | Candidate | Votes | % |
|---|---|---|---|
| Democratic | Sue Thorn | 49,203 | 100.0 |
| Total votes | | 49,203 | 100.0 |

=== General election ===
==== Predictions ====
| Source | Ranking | As of |
|---|---|---|
| The Cook Political Report | Safe R | November 5, 2012 |
| Rothenberg | Safe R | November 2, 2012 |
| Roll Call | Safe R | November 4, 2012 |
| Sabato's Crystal Ball | Safe R | November 5, 2012 |
| NY Times | Safe R | November 4, 2012 |
| RCP | Safe R | November 4, 2012 |
| The Hill | Safe R | November 4, 2012 |

==== Results ====
West Virginia's 1st congressional district, 2012
| Party | Candidate | Votes | % |
|---|---|---|---|
| Republican | David McKinley (incumbent) | 133,809 | 62.5 |
| Democratic | Sue Thorn | 80,342 | 37.5 |
| Total votes | | 214,151 | 100.0 |
| Republican hold | | | |

== District 2 ==
2012 West Virginia's 2nd congressional district election
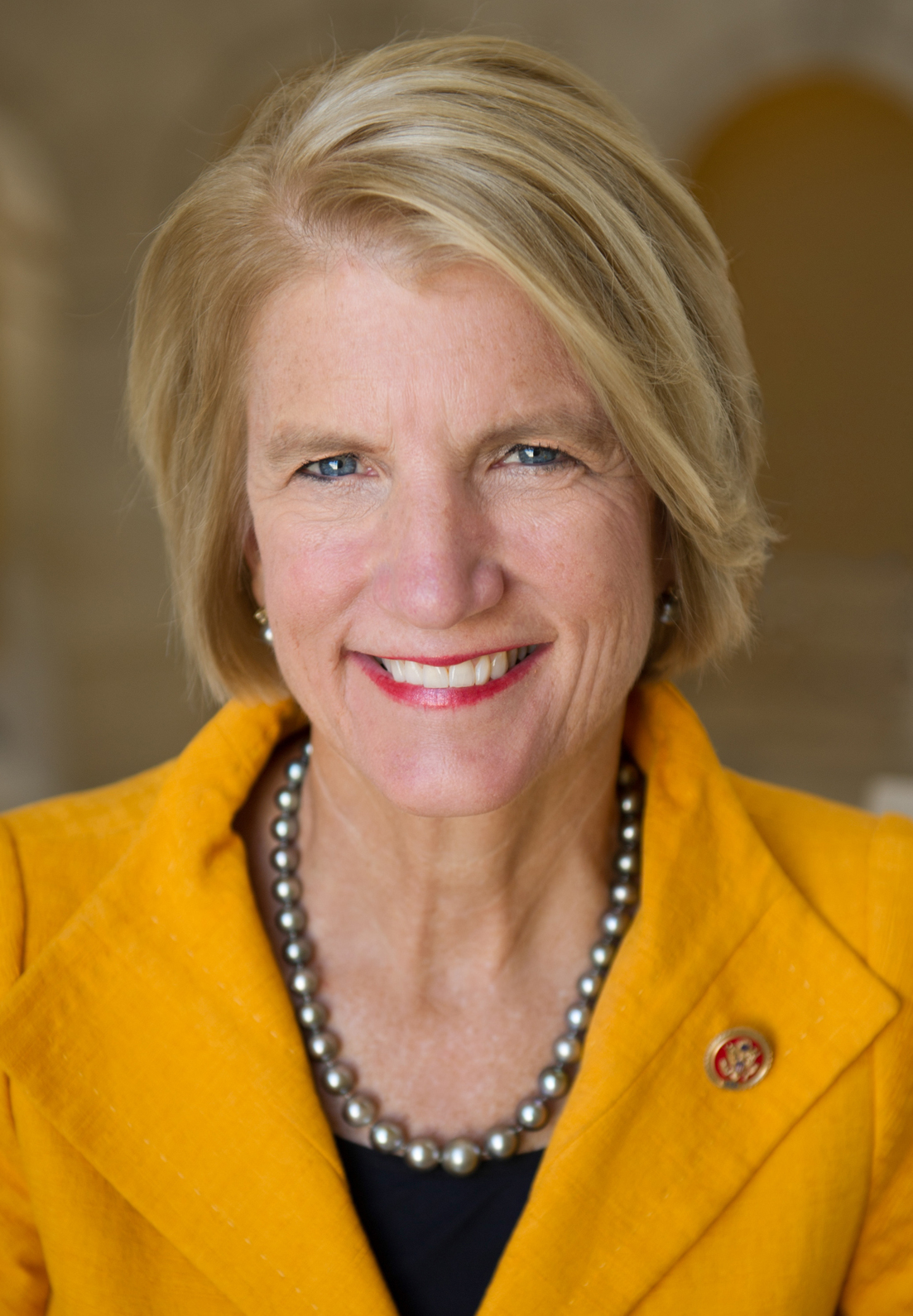

| Nominee | Shelley Moore Capito | Howard Stint |
| Party | Republican | Democratic |
| Popular vote | 158,206 | 68,560 |
| Percentage | 69.8% | 30.2% |
- County results Capito: 50–60% 60–70% 70–80% 80–90%
U.S. Representative before election
Shelley Moore Capito
Republican
Elected U.S. Representative
Shelley Moore Capito
Republican

Republican Shelley Moore Capito, who has represented West Virginia's 2nd congressional district since 2001, ran for reelection.

=== Republican primary ===
==== Candidates ====
===== Nominee =====
- Shelley Moore Capito, incumbent U.S. Representative

===== Eliminated in primary =====
- Michael Davis, retired school teacher
- Jonathan Miller, state delegate

==== Primary results ====
Republican primary results
| Party | Candidate | Votes | % |
|---|---|---|---|
| Republican | Shelley Moore Capito (incumbent) | 35,088 | 83.0 |
| Republican | Jonathan Miller | 4,711 | 11.1 |
| Republican | Michael Davis | 2,495 | 5.9 |
| Total votes | | 42,294 | 100.0 |

=== Democratic primary ===
==== Candidates ====
===== Nominee =====
- Howard Swint, commercial property leasing manager and opinion writer

===== Eliminated in primary =====
- Dugald Brown, IT specialist
- William McCann, slot machine technician

==== Declined ====
- Thornton Cooper, lawyer

==== Primary results ====
Democratic primary results
| Party | Candidate | Votes | % |
|---|---|---|---|
| Democratic | Howard Swint | 22,563 | 48.3 |
| Democratic | William McCann | 13,668 | 29.2 |
| Democratic | Dugald Brown | 10,514 | 22.5 |
| Total votes | | 46,745 | 100.0 |

=== General election ===
==== Predictions ====
| Source | Ranking | As of |
|---|---|---|
| The Cook Political Report | Safe R | November 5, 2012 |
| Rothenberg | Safe R | November 2, 2012 |
| Roll Call | Safe R | November 4, 2012 |
| Sabato's Crystal Ball | Safe R | November 5, 2012 |
| NY Times | Safe R | November 4, 2012 |
| RCP | Safe R | November 4, 2012 |
| The Hill | Safe R | November 4, 2012 |

==== Results ====
West Virginia's 2nd congressional district, 2012
| Party | Candidate | Votes | % |
|---|---|---|---|
| Republican | Shelley Moore Capito (incumbent) | 158,206 | 69.8 |
| Democratic | Howard Swint | 68,560 | 30.2 |
| Total votes | | 226,766 | 100.0 |
| Republican hold | | | |

== District 3 ==
2012 West Virginia's 3rd congressional district election
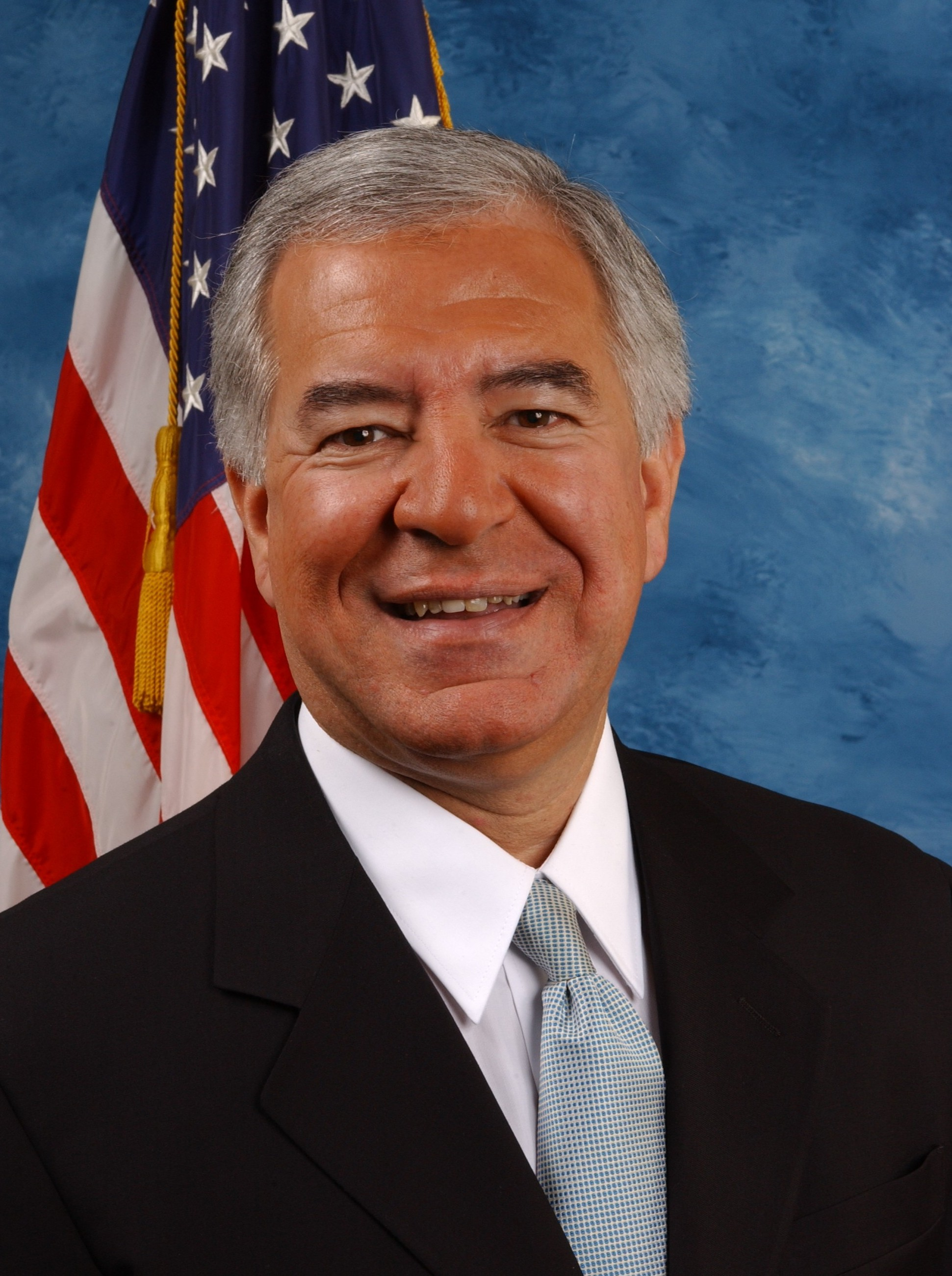

| Nominee | Nick Rahall | Rick Snuffer |
| Party | Democratic | Republican |
| Popular vote | 108,223 | 92,214 |
| Percentage | 53.9% | 46.0% |
- County results Rahall: 50–60% 60–70% Snuffer: 50–60%
U.S. Representative before election
Nick Rahall
Democratic
Elected U.S. Representative
Nick Rahall
Democratic

Democrat Nick Rahall, who had represented West Virginia's 3rd congressional district since 1993, ran for reelection.

=== Democratic primary ===
==== Candidates ====
===== Nominee =====
- Nick Rahall, incumbent U.S. Representative

==== Primary results ====
Democratic primary results
| Party | Candidate | Votes | % |
|---|---|---|---|
| Democratic | Nick Rahall (incumbent) | 66,745 | 100.0 |
| Total votes | | 66,745 | 100.0 |

=== Republican primary ===
==== Candidates ====
===== Nominee =====
- Rick Snuffer, state delegate and nominee for this seat in 2004

===== Eliminated in primary =====
- Lee Bias
- Bill Lester

==== Primary results ====
Republican primary results
| Party | Candidate | Votes | % |
|---|---|---|---|
| Republican | Rick Snuffer | 12,359 | 53.4 |
| Republican | Lee Bias | 6,671 | 28.8 |
| Republican | Bill Lester | 4,104 | 17.8 |
| Total votes | | 23,134 | 100.0 |

=== General election ===
==== Endorsements ====
Rick Snuffer (R)

Organizations

- National Republican Congressional Committee "Young Guns" Program

==== Predictions ====
| Source | Ranking | As of |
|---|---|---|
| The Cook Political Report | Likely D | November 5, 2012 |
| Rothenberg | Safe D | November 2, 2012 |
| Roll Call | Likely D | November 4, 2012 |
| Sabato's Crystal Ball | Likely D | November 5, 2012 |
| NY Times | Lean D | November 4, 2012 |
| RCP | Likely D | November 4, 2012 |
| The Hill | Likely D | November 4, 2012 |

==== Results ====
West Virginia's 3rd congressional district, 2012
| Party | Candidate | Votes | % |
|---|---|---|---|
| Democratic | Nick Rahall (incumbent) | 108,199 | 54.0 |
| Republican | Rick Snuffer | 92,238 | 46.0 |
| Total votes | | 200,437 | 100.0 |
| Democratic hold | | | |
