= Jordan Hill (politician) =

American politician

Member of the West Virginia House of Delegates from the 41st district
- In office December 1, 2014 – June 17, 2020
- Preceded by: Adam Young
- Succeeded by: Heather Tully

Personal details
- Born: November 14, 1990 (age 35) Charleston, West Virginia, U.S.
- Party: Republican

Jordan Hill (born November 14, 1990) is an American politician who served as a member of the West Virginia House of Delegates for the 41st district from 2014 to 2020.
