= Linda Phillips (politician) =

American politician

Member of the West Virginia House of Delegates from the 25th district
- In office January 12, 2013 – December 31, 2015
- Succeeded by: Frank Blackwell

Member of the West Virginia House of Delegates from the 22nd district
- In office January 2009 – January 2013 Serving with Daniel Hall

Personal details
- Born: October 21, 1952 (age 73) Mullens, West Virginia, U.S.
- Party: Democratic
- Education: Marshall University

Linda Lee Goode Phillips (born October 21, 1952) is an American politician who was a Democratic member of the West Virginia House of Delegates representing District 25 from January 12, 2013 to December 31, 2015. Phillips served consecutively from January 2009 until January 2013 in the District 22 seat.

== Education ==
Phillips earned her BA and MA from Marshall University.

== Elections ==
- 2012 Redistricted to District 25, Phillips was challenged the May 8, 2012 Democratic Primary, winning with 2,145 votes (84.2%), and was unopposed for the November 6, 2012 General election, winning with 4,880 votes.
- 2008 When District 22 Democratic Representative Richard Browning ran for West Virginia Senate and left the seat open, Phillips ran in the six-way May 13, 2008 Democratic Primary and placed first with 3,531 votes (28.1%); incumbent Representative Mike Burdiss placed fourth; Phillips and fellow nominee Daniel Hall were unopposed for the November 4, 2008 General election where Phillips placed first with 6,824 votes (53.7%).
- 2010 Phillips and Representative Hall were unopposed for the May 11, 2010 Democratic Primary where Phillips placed first with 2,377 votes (54.9%), and won the three-way two-position November 2, 2010 General election with 4,357 votes (40.0%) ahead of Representative Hall and Republican nominee Shawn Spears; Hall was elected to the West Virginia Senate in 2012.
