= Clif Moore =

American politician

Cliff Moore

Member of the West Virginia House of Delegates from the 26th district
- In office December 1, 2012 - December 1, 2016
- Succeeded by: Ed Evans

Member of the West Virginia House of Delegates from the 23rd district
- In office December 1, 2004 – December 1, 2012
- Succeeded by: Larry W. Barker

Personal details
- Born: February 15, 1949 (age 77) Thorpe, West Virginia, U.S.
- Party: Democratic
- Education: West Virginia State College, Kennedy Western University
- Occupation: administrator

Clifton Moore (born February 15, 1949) is an American former politician who was a Democratic member of the West Virginia House of Delegates from 2004 to 2016. He currently serves as Assistant Majority Whip.
