= John O'Neal (politician) =

American politician

Member of the West Virginia House of Delegates from the 28th district
- In office January 12, 2013 – January 10, 2018
- Succeeded by: Jeffrey Pack

Member of the West Virginia House of Delegates from the 27th district
- In office January 2011 – January 2013

Personal details
- Born: Hinton, West Virginia, U.S.
- Party: Republican
- Education: Alderson Broaddus College (BA); Liberty University (MA)

John David O'Neal IV is an American politician who served as a member of the West Virginia House of Delegates for the 28th district from 2013 to 2018. O'Neal served consecutively from January 2011 until January 2013 in the District 27 seat.

== Education ==
Born in Hinton, West Virginia, O'Neal earned his Bachelor of Arts degree in political science from Alderson Broaddus College and a Master of Arts in religion from Liberty University.

== Elections ==
- 2012 Redistricted to District 28, O'Neal ran in the three-way May 8, 2012 Republican Primary and placed first with 1,341 votes (40.9%), and placed first in the four-way two-position November 6, 2012 General election with 8,189 votes (28.9%) ahead of fellow Republican Roy Cooper (who had run in District 26 in 2010) and Democratic nominees Jeffry Pritt and Al Martine.
- 2010 O'Neal ran in the four-way May 11, 2010 Republican Primary and placed third with 1,558 votes (22.5%), and placed fourth in the nine-way five-position November 2, 2010 General election behind Linda Sumner (R), Rick Snuffer (R), and Rick Moye (D).
