= Jeffrey Pack =

American politician

Commissioner of the West Virginia Bureau for Social Services
- Incumbent
- Assumed office August 2, 2021
- Preceded by: Position established

Member of the West Virginia House of Delegates from the 28th district
- In office January 10, 2018 – July 30, 2021
- Preceded by: John O'Neal
- Succeeded by: Jordan Maynor

Personal details
- Born: March 8, 1980 (age 46) Beckley, West Virginia, U.S.
- Party: Republican
- Children: 2
- Education: Concord University (BA)

Jeffrey M. Pack (born March 8, 1980) is an American politician who served in the West Virginia House of Delegates from the 28th district from 2018 to 2021. He is currently serving as a commissioner in the West Virginia Bureau of Social Services.

== Early life and education ==
Pack was born in Beckley, West Virginia in 1980. He earned a Bachelor of Arts degree from Concord University.

== Career ==
Pack was appointed to the West Virginia House of Delegates on January 10, 2018, succeeding John O'Neal. In the 2019–2020 legislative session, Pack was vice chair of the House Health and Human Resources Committee, and later became the chair. In July 2021, Pack resigned after being appointed as a commissioner in the West Virginia Department of Health and Human Resources' then-newly established Bureau for Social Services.
