= Joe Canestraro =

American politician

Member of the West Virginia House of Delegates from the 4th district
- In office December 1, 2016 – December 1, 2020
- Preceded by: David Evans

Personal details
- Born: Joseph R. Canestraro; November 9, 1976 (age 49) Wheeling, West Virginia, U.S.
- Party: Democratic

Joe Canestraro (born November 9, 1976) is an American politician who served in the West Virginia House of Delegates from the 4th district from December 1, 2016, until December 1, 2020. On January 1, 2021, he became the Prosecuting Attorney for Marshall County, West Virginia.
