= Mike Pushkin =

American politician (born 1970

Chair of the West Virginia Democratic Party
- Incumbent
- Assumed office June 18, 2022
- Preceded by: Belinda Biafore

Member of the West Virginia House of Delegates from the 54th district
- Incumbent
- Assumed office December 31, 2014
- Preceded by: Meshea Poore

Personal details
- Born: February 8, 1970 (age 56) Charleston, West Virginia, U.S.
- Party: Democratic
- Education: West Virginia University (attended)
- Website: State house website Campaign website

Mike Pushkin (born February 8, 1970) is an American politician who is the Chair of the West Virginia Democratic Party and a Democratic member of the West Virginia House of Delegates representing District 54 (District 37 prior to 2020 census redistricting). He is also a taxi driver and musician, taking passengers or playing as a guitarist for his band "600 Lbs of Sin!" when the legislature is not in session. Pushkin authored the original legislation to impeach the Justices of the Supreme Court of Appeals of West Virginia.

== Early life and education ==
Pushkin started playing drums at the age of eight and switched to guitar at 13. He attended The Hill School for a year. He also briefly attended West Virginia University before deciding to pursue music.

== Career ==
=== Taxi driver ===
Pushkin worked as a taxi driver in Charleston, WV for many years, starting in 2001.

=== Musical ===
Pushkin is a member of the American Federation of Musicians Local 136. His former band was a five-member ensemble known as 600 Lbs of Sin! which takes its name from a Grateful Dead song. Many of his original songs are political in content, in response to coal mining or environmental issues. His most famous song is a reaction to the Upper Big Branch Mine disaster, a 2010 mine collapse. Pushkin taxied reporters to the site of the mine and was moved to sadness by the plight of miners. More recently, he has played in a new band, “Mike Pushkin and the Loyal Opposition”.

As a musician, he often covers the Grateful Dead and has played Country Roads at rallies.

=== Political ===
In 2014, Pushkin announced plans to run for Elections to West Virginia's 37th District after the incumbent launched a Congressional campaign. His campaign slogan was “I'll take YOU there!” In 2016, he won a second term. Pushkin was endorsed by American Federation of Teachers, Communications Workers of America, UMWA, AFL–CIO, Teamsters, WVEA, United Electrical, Radio and Machine Workers of America, Carpenters, Operators and Engineers, Charleston Firefighters, and the Sierra Club.

Pushkin's legislative district, District 37 in the West Virginia House of Delegates, was the only legislative district in either chamber of the West Virginia State Legislature that supported Democratic nominee Hillary Clinton over Republican Donald Trump in the 2016 United States presidential election. In 2016, Clinton carried the state legislative district with 64.48 percent of the vote. Pushkin carried the same district with 75.2 percent of the vote in that year's general election, outrunning the Democratic presidential nominee by more than ten percentage points.

The West Virginia Democratic Party elected Mike Pushkin to be Chair of the party at their organizational meeting on June 18, 2022 in Bridgeport, West Virginia.

==== Legislation ====
Pushkin has developed a reputation for providing an independent voice on bills. He opposed the Religious Freedom Restoration Act, which gives businesses the right to decline to serve gay customers. In his first term, he introduced the Second Chance for Employment Act, which provides the opportunity for felons to have their records cleared after 10 years. He also unsuccessfully introduced a bill to legalize recreational marijuana during his first term. He reintroduced the Second Chance bill during his second term and the bill passed when a compromise was reached that would expunge misdemeanors, not felonies. He fought to successfully pass the West Virginia Medical Cannabis Act.

In 2018, Pushkin was a staunch proponent of the successful impeachment of the Supreme Court of West Virginia. Pushkin wrote the original resolution to initiate impeachment proceedings back in February. He was one of the first legislators to push for an investigation into Justice Loughry for his personal use of state property and the subsequent cover-up. In 2018, Pushkin was a vocal supporter of the efforts to give teachers a pay raise and improve wages in the public sector.

== Personal life ==
In 2004, Pushkin began his sobriety journey and has maintained abstinence from all mood and mind alternating substances to this day.

Pushkin is one of two Jewish members in the West Virginia legislature.

Party political offices
Preceded by Belinda Biafore	Chair of the West Virginia Democratic Party; 2022–present	Incumbent
