= Joshua Nelson (politician) =

American politician

Member of the West Virginia House of Delegates from the 23rd district
- In office December 1, 2012 – December 1, 2016
- Preceded by: Larry W. Barker
- Succeeded by: Rodney Miller

Personal details
- Born: February 20, 1987 (age 39)
- Party: Republican
- Education: Liberty University/ University of Charleston
- Profession: Combat Pilot/ Rancher

Military service
- Branch/service: United States Marine Corps (2006–2011); Air National Guard (since 2011)

Joshua Allan Nelson (born February 20, 1987) is an American politician who was a Republican member of the West Virginia House of Delegates representing District 23 from January 12, 2013, to January 2016. He did not seek re-election in 2016, instead choosing to run for County Commissioner of Boone County, West Virginia. He was defeated in the general election.

== Education ==
Nelson earned his BS in aeronautics from Liberty University and an MBA from University of Charleston.

== Elections ==
- 2012: Nelson challenged Democratic delegate Larry Barker (who had been redistricted from District 18) and was unopposed in the Republican primary, held on May 8, 2012, winning with 412 votes. Nelson won the November 6, 2012 general election with 3,985 votes (62.4%), defeating Barker.
- 2014: Nelson was unopposed in the Republican primary. He defeated Democratic Party challenger Barry Brown and Mountain Party challenger Danny Cook in the general election with 2,411 votes (50.4%).
- 2016: He served as the Chairman of the House Committee on Veteran Affairs. Nelson ran unopposed in the Republican primary for County Commissioner of Boone County, West Virginia. He was defeated in the general election by Craig Bratcher, taking 3,728 votes to Bratcher's 4,879.

== 2014 legislative session ==
After being re-elected in 2014, Nelson missed the entire 60-day spring session of the West Virginia Legislature while participating in flight training in Texas as part of his duties as a member of the Air National Guard. Although he did not attend the legislative session, he collected a full $15,000 paycheck. Nelson ultimately donated the $15,000 paycheck to local churches and community organizations. Regardless of attendance, West Virginia law requires that legislators be paid $15,000 for a regular legislative session.
