= Roy Cooper (West Virginia politician) =

American politician

Member of the West Virginia House of Delegates from the 28th district
- Incumbent
- Assumed office January 12, 2013

Personal details
- Born: March 5, 1945 (age 81)
- Party: Republican
- Education: Tidewater Community College; Concord College

Roy Gale Cooper (born March 5, 1945) is an American politician and a Republican member of the West Virginia House of Delegates representing District 28 since January 12, 2013.

== Early life and education ==
Born in 1945, Cooper earned his AS in Business management from Tidewater Community College and his BS in education from Concord College (now Concord University).

== Elections ==
- 2012 Redistricted to District 28, Cooper ran in the three-way May 8, 2012 Republican Primary and placed second with 997 votes (30.4%), and placed second in the four-way two-position November 6, 2012 General election with 4,233 votes (59.6%) behind incumbent Republican Representative John O'Neal (who had been redistricted from District 27) and ahead of Democratic nominees Jeffry Pritt and Al Martine.
- 2010 To challenge District 26 incumbent Democratic Representative Gerald Crosier, Cooper was unopposed for the May 11, 2010 Republican Primary, winning with 828 votes, but lost the November 2, 2010 General election to Representative Crosier.
