= Michael Ferro =

American politician (born 1951)

Member of the West Virginia House of Delegates from the 4th district
- In office January 2009 – 2018
- Preceded by: Kenneth Tucker

Personal details
- Born: April 19, 1951 (age 75) Miami, Florida, U.S.
- Party: Democratic
- Education: West Liberty State College; West Virginia University

Michael Thomas Ferro (born April 19, 1951) is an American politician who was a Democratic member of the West Virginia House of Delegates representing District 4 from January 2009 to 2018.

== Education ==
Ferro earned his BA from West Liberty State College (now West Liberty University), and his MA from West Virginia University.

== Elections ==
- 2012 When Representative Scott Varner retired and left a seat open, Ferro placed first in the four-way May 8, 2012 Democratic Primary with 3,383 votes (41.3%), and placed first in the three-way two-position November 6, 2012 General election with 8,697 votes (39.1%) ahead of Republican nominee David Evans and fellow Democratic nominee David Sidiropolis.
- 2008 Ferro challenged incumbent Representatives Kenneth Tucker and Scott Varner in the three-way May 13, 2008 Democratic Primary and placed second with 3,759 votes (33.4%) ahead of Representative Tucker; and placed second in the four-way two-position November 4, 2008 General election with 6,949 votes (29.0%) behind incumbent Representative Varner and ahead of Republican nominee Ronald Morris (who had run for the seat in 2004 and 2006) and Independent candidate R. E. Hartley.
- 2010 Ferro and Representative Varner were challenged in the three-way May 11, 2010 Democratic Primary where Ferro placed second behind Representative Varner with 3,317 votes (43.0%); they were unopposed for the November 2, 2010 General election where Ferro placed second with 6,894 votes (47.7%).
