= Richard Browning (politician) =

American politician (1952–2025)

Member of the West Virginia Senate from the 9th district
- In office December 1, 2008 – December 1, 2012
- Preceded by: Billy Wayne Bailey
- Succeeded by: Daniel Hall

Member of the West Virginia House of Delegates from the 22nd district
- In office December 1, 2000 – December 1, 2008
- Succeeded by: Daniel Hall; Linda Goode Phillips

Personal details
- Born: November 14, 1952 Mallory, West Virginia, U.S.
- Died: December 2025 (aged 73)
- Party: Democratic
- Spouse: Delores Cook
- Children: Shea Richard; Joseph Dale; Maria Caroline
- Education: Marshall University (A.B.); West Virginia University (M.A.); West Virginia University College of Graduate Studies (M.A.)
- Occupation: Executive director

Dwight Richard Browning (November 14, 1952 – December 2025) was an American politician who was a member of the West Virginia Senate from Wyoming County, West Virginia. A Democrat, he served from 2008 to 2012 for the 9th district. Before his election to the senate, Browning was a member of the West Virginia House of Delegates from 1988 to 1996 and from 2000 to 2008. Browning died in December 2025, at the age of 73.
