= David Evans (West Virginia politician) =

American politician (born 1945)

Member of the West Virginia House of Delegates from the 4th district
- In office January 12, 2013 – December 31, 2016
- Preceded by: Scott Varner
- Succeeded by: Joe Canestraro

Personal details
- Born: May 3, 1945 (age 81) Corton, West Virginia, U.S.
- Party: Republican
- Education: Glenville State College; West Virginia University

David A. Evans (born May 3, 1945) is an American politician who was a Republican member of the West Virginia House of Delegates representing District 4 from January 12, 2013, to December 31, 2016. He was soundly defeated by Democrat Joseph Canestrero. Evans was a teacher at Cameron High school in Cameron, West Virginia.

== Education ==
Evans earned his BA in education from Glenville State College and his master's degree from West Virginia University.

== Elections ==
- 2012 When District 4 Democratic Representative Scott Varner retired and left the seat open, Evans was unopposed for the May 8, 2012 Republican Primary, winning with 2,157 votes, and placed second in the three-way two-position November 6, 2012 General election with 6,927 votes (31.2%) behind incumbent Democratic Representative Michael Ferro and ahead of Democratic nominee David Sidiropolis.
