= Meshea Poore =

American lawyer and politician

Member of the West Virginia House of Delegates from the 37th district
- In office December 1, 2012 – December 31, 2014
- Succeeded by: Mike Pushkin

Member of the West Virginia House of Delegates from the 31st district
- In office December 18, 2009 – December 1, 2012
- Preceded by: Carrie Webster
- Succeeded by: Karen Arvon

Personal details
- Born: September 2, 1975 (age 51) Charleston, West Virginia, U.S.
- Party: Democratic
- Education: Howard University (B.A.); Southern University Law Center (J.D.)
- Occupation: Attorney

Meshea La'Shawn Poore is an American lawyer and politician from the state of West Virginia. A member of the Democratic Party, Poore served in the West Virginia House of Delegates, representing the 37th district.

Meshea Poore was the vice president of campus engagement and compliance at West Virginia University from February 19, 2025 through August 31, 2025

== Biography ==
Poore is from Kanawha City, West Virginia. She graduated from Howard University with a bachelor's degree, and from the Southern University Law Center with her juris doctor. She worked as a public defender in Kanawha County, and then joined the Dooley Law Firm.

In 2008, Poore ran for election to the West Virginia House of Delegates, representing the 31st district. She lost the Democratic Party primary election to incumbent Carrie Webster by 117 votes. In 2009, Webster became a circuit judge, and Joe Manchin, the then-Governor of West Virginia, appointed Poore to the House of Delegates to serve the remainder of Webster's term. Poore was reelected in 2010 and 2012.

Poore was a candidate in the 2014 election to succeed Shelley Moore Capito as the representative from West Virginia's 2nd congressional district. She was defeated by former Chairman of the West Virginia Democratic Party, Nick Casey.
