= Adam Young (politician) =

American politician (born 1982)

Adam Ryan Young

Member of the West Virginia House of Representatives from the 41st district

Personal details
- Born: December 16, 1982 (age 43) Summersville, West Virginia
- Party: Democratic
- Education: Glenville State College; Salem International University
- Occupation: Teacher

Adam Ryan Young is a Democratic party politician who was a member of the West Virginia House of Delegates during 2012–2014, representing the 41st district. Young has been a social studies teacher at Nicholas County High School since 2007.

During his time in office, Young cosponsored House Joint Resolution 108, the "Nonprofit Youth Organization Tax Exempt Support Amendment", which proposed an amendment to the Constitution of West Virginia. The amendment was referred to the public and approved by voters on November 4, 2014, becoming the first amendment to West Virginia's constitution in approximately ten years. The amendment, specifically written to benefit the Summit Bechtel Family National Scout Reserve of the Boy Scouts of America, allows nonprofit youth organizations that focus on adventure, education or recreation to rent out or lease their facilities without being required to pay property taxes if the facilities cost at least $100 million.
