= Virginia Mahan =

American politician (1949–2023)

Member of the West Virginia House of Representatives from the 27th district
- In office 1997–2012

Personal details
- Died: July 24, 2023 (aged 74)
- Party: Democratic

Virginia Ann Mahan (1949 – July 24, 2023) was an American politician from West Virginia. She was a Democrat and represented District 27 in the West Virginia House of Delegates from 1997 to 2012. She retired at the 2012 election.
