= Nick Rahall =

American politician (born 1949)

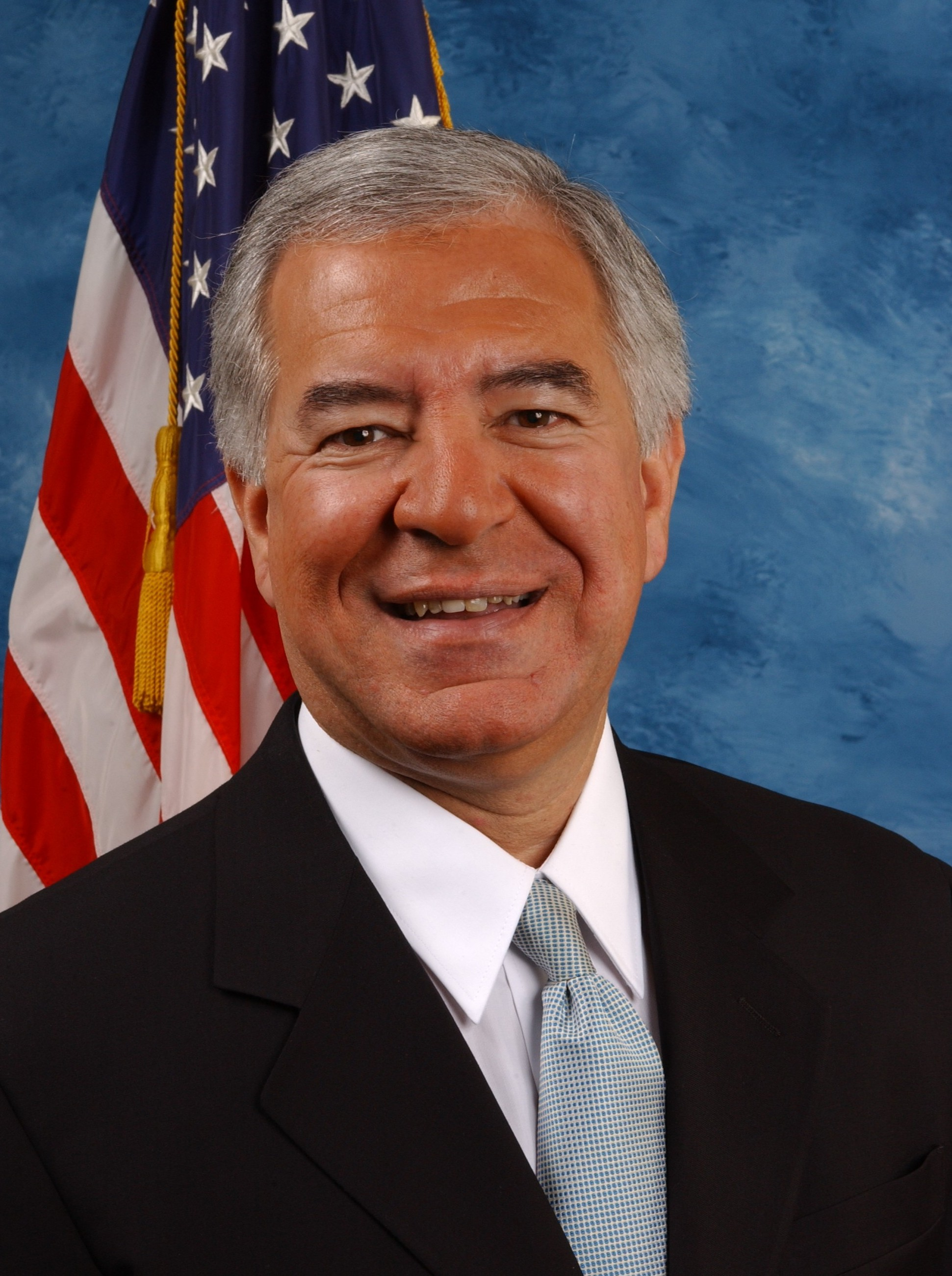

Ranking Member of the House Transportation Committee
- In office January 3, 2011 – January 3, 2015
- Preceded by: John Mica
- Succeeded by: Peter DeFazio

Chair of the House Natural Resources Committee
- In office January 3, 2007 – January 3, 2011
- Preceded by: Richard Pombo
- Succeeded by: Doc Hastings

Ranking Member of the House Natural Resources Committee
- In office January 3, 2001 – January 3, 2007
- Preceded by: George Miller
- Succeeded by: Don Young

Member of the U.S. House of Representatives from West Virginia
- In office January 3, 1977 – January 3, 2015
- Preceded by: Ken Hechler
- Succeeded by: Evan Jenkins
- Constituency: 4th district (1977–1993); 3rd district (1993–2015)

Personal details
- Born: Nicholas Joseph Rahall II; May 20, 1949 (age 77) Beckley, West Virginia, U.S.
- Party: Democratic
- Spouse: Melinda Rahall (second wife)
- Education: Duke University (BA); George Washington University (attended)
- Rahall's voice Rahall on the 2006 Sago Mine disaster. Recorded February 8, 2006

Nicholas Joseph Rahall II (/reɪˈhɑːl/ RAY-hall; born May 20, 1949) is an American politician and member of the Democratic Party who served in the United States House of Representatives from 1977 to 2015. He is the longest-serving member ever of the United States House of Representatives from the state of West Virginia.

He began his political service in the early 1970s working in the cloak room of the U.S. Senate, as a staff member in the Senate Office of the Majority Whip from 1971–1974, and as a delegate to the Democratic National Conventions in 1972 and 1976. He was elected as a Democrat to the U.S. House of Representatives in 1976 to represent the now-defunct 4th congressional district. He became the representative for the 3rd congressional district when reapportionment was completed following the 1990 census. He was re-elected for nineteen terms, serving from January 3, 1977 to January 3, 2015.

His district included the southern, coal-dominated portion of the state, including Huntington, Bluefield, and Beckley. Rahall was the Ranking Member of the House Committee on Transportation and Infrastructure.

Rahall lost re-election in 2014 to Evan Jenkins. As of 2026, he is the last Democrat to have represented West Virginia in the U.S. House of Representatives.

== Early life, education, and early career ==
Rahall was born in Beckley, West Virginia, the son of Mary Alice and Nicholas Joseph Rahall. He is a Presbyterian of Lebanese Protestant descent, whose grandparents immigrated from Lebanon.

His family owned radio station WWNR, which his father started with his uncles Farris, Sam, and Deem, and expanded to own other radio stations in a number of states.

Rahall graduated in 1971 from Duke University. He attended graduate school at the George Washington University, but did not graduate. He then worked as a sales rep for his family's radio station, WWNR. He served as president of the Mountaineer Tour and Travel Agency in 1974, and was president of West Virginia Broadcasting.

He went to work as staff assistant for the late U.S. Senator Robert Byrd who he identifies as a mentor.

== U.S. House of Representatives ==
=== Elections ===
1970s–90s

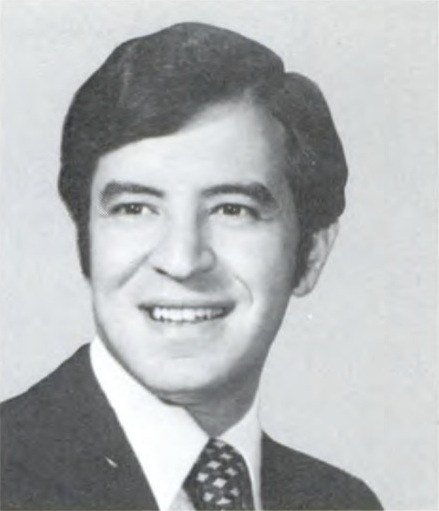
Rahall during his first term in Congress

Rahall was elected to Congress in 1976 in the 4th district, succeeding Ken Hechler who ran for governor. Rahall won the district primary with a plurality of 38%. Hechler lost the primary for governor, and attempted a write-in campaign for the congressional seat. Rahall won the general election with 46% of the vote, while Hechler got 37%.

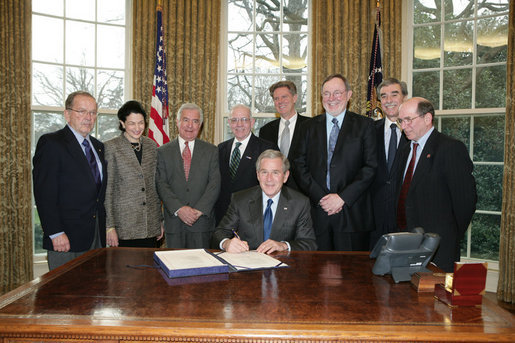
Rahall watching President George W. Bush prepare to the sign the Magnuson-Stevens Fishery Conservation and Management Act Re-authorization act on January 12, 2007.

In 1978, Hechler challenged Rahall in the Democratic primary, and Rahall won with 56% of the vote. He was re-elected 17 times. Hechler later became the West Virginia Secretary of State, and ran against Rahall in the primary in 1990. Rahall defeated him, receiving 57% of the vote.

In 1990, Rahall defeated Republican insurance agent Marianne Brewster with just 52% of the vote, the second-lowest winning percentage of his career. The district was redrawn after the 1990 census, becoming the 3rd district, due to changes to the state's population.

2010

In 2010, he defeated Republican former State Supreme Court Justice Spike Maynard with 56% of the vote, his lowest percentage since 1990.

2012

In the 2012 election, Rahall defeated Republican Rick Snuffer with 53.5% of the vote. His eight-point margin of victory was his narrowest since 1990.

2014

In 2014, Rahall faced a primary challenge from fellow Democrat and retired Army officer Richard Ojeda. Rahall won the primary with 66.4% of the vote.

He faced Republican State Senator Evan Jenkins in the November general election. Jenkins had served in the state legislature for 20 years as a Democrat, but had switched parties. Jenkins and Rahall had contributed to each other's campaigns in the decade's previous election cycles.

Rahall was considered one of the most "endangered" House Democrats by the House Democratic campaign committee. He received an endorsement from the NRA.

As of September 18, 2014, the race was rated a "toss up" by both University of Virginia political professor Larry Sabato, of Sabato's Crystal Ball, and Stu Rothenberg of the Rothenberg Political Report. As of October 2, managing editor Kyle Kondik of Sabato's Crystal Ball said the race was still a toss-up, calling it "Super close, super expensive and super nasty." The Rahall campaign outspent the Jenkins campaign in the election by a two-to-one ratio.

Ultimately, Rahall was defeated, with 44.7% of the vote to Jenkins' 55.3% of the vote. In the process, he lost a number of areas that had reliably supported him for years.

Having served 19 terms in the House, the 65-year-old Rahall qualified for a Congressional pension of about $139,000 a year.

=== Committee assignments ===
- Committee on Transportation and Infrastructure (Ranking Member)
  - Subcommittee on Aviation
  - Subcommittee on Highways and Transit
  - Subcommittee on Railroads, Pipelines, and Hazardous Materials

== Political issues ==
Rahall was a member of the conservative Blue Dog Democrat coalition.

=== Mining ===
In 2010, Rahall introduced legislation to improve mine safety. Rahall opposed legislation designed to end mountaintop removal mining, a process often used in West Virginia.

Rahall's policies involving mountaintop removal mining have been criticized as reflected by author and journalist Jeff Biggers in "The Blog" in The Huffington Post, with the link between mountaintop removal mining and flooding, as well as the billions of pounds of explosives used since 2004, being given as examples.

=== Environmental issues ===
Rahall accepts anthropogenic climate change as real and has stated that to reject the scientific consensus regarding it is "to just put your head in the sand."

Rahall called the Environmental Protection Agency "callous", attacked Barack Obama's greenhouse gas rule as "disastrous", and filed legislation to block the president's climate agenda, but in the summer of 2013 he attended a ceremony to rename the EPA headquarters and has praised EPA Administrator Gina McCarthy. Rahall, alongside three other Democrats, supported a GOP bill that would limit EPA authority on CO_{2} emissions, the Energy Tax Prevention Act. He commented on this, saying: "I am dead set against the E.P.A.'s plowing ahead on its own with new regulations to limit greenhouse gases." He also voted against the American Clean Energy and Security Act.

In 2007, Rahall introduced the Energy Independence and Security Act of 2007, which banned incandescent light bulbs. Despite introducing the legislation, Rahall voted against the bill on final passage. As a result of the legislation, as of January 1, 2014, incandescent light bulbs between 40 watts and 150 watts are illegal to manufacture or import.

In 2013, Rahall voted for the Progressive Caucus's budget, which included provisions for a carbon tax. The budget failed to pass.

=== Foreign policy ===
Rahall and another Congressman of Arab descent traveled to Syria and ignored State Department policy by meeting with Palestinian leader Yasser Arafat, whom Rahall had known for years. Queen Noor of Jordan presented Rahall with the first Najeeb Halaby Award for public service.

Rahall opposed the 2003 invasion of Iraq. Rahall had traveled to Baghdad just before the Iraq War with the intention of convincing Iraqi leaders to allow the U.N. to inspect Iraq's weapons and have access to every site. He said that Tariq Aziz had accepted all of Bush's demands, and that "Bush said the war was not inevitable, but we now know that wasn't true. Iraqis did allow for complete access but Bush's mind was already made up. Iraqis were damned if they did and damned if they didn't .... We were falsely led into this war."

In 2004, it was reported that Rahall feared that Syria would be attacked by Bush before the November elections. He said that "They're using the same rhetoric against the Syrians they used against Iraqis.... We now have the Syrian Accountability Act. All this despite the State Department's admission that Syria helped us capture key al-Qaeda operatives and helped save American lives." As for Saudi Arabia, Rahall said that the U.S. "wouldn't dare" attack that country: "The Kingdom has been a key ally for decades."

=== Israel ===
Rahall has expressed concern about America's relationship with Israel. He said, "Israel can't continue to occupy, humiliate and destroy the dreams and spirits of the Palestinian people and continue to call itself a democratic state."

Rahall, along with other Lebanese-American lawmakers, expressed concern with a bipartisan resolution supporting Israel in the 2006 Israel-Lebanon conflict without adding language urging restraint against civilian targets. He helped draft a resolution that urged "all parties to protect innocent life and civilian infrastructure."

Rahall was the only member of the House to oppose the 1993 resolution urging Arab states to end their boycott of Israel.

Rahall was the most senior of five Arab American lawmakers on Capitol Hill.

=== Endorsement of Barack Obama ===
In 2008, Rahall endorsed Barack Obama, saying Obama understood the needs and aspirations of West Virginians. He was also Chair of the Arab Americans for Obama group. Explaining his position, Rahall cited Senator Byrd, who said "I work for no President. I work with Presidents." In an interview with Keith Olbermann, Rahall said that Obama had the courage and conviction to win the presidency, and that the then-senator was a true agent for change.

=== Ethical issues ===
In 2004, the Los Angeles Times ran an article about Rahall and his sister, lobbyist Tanya Rahall. They reported that she made $15,000 per month as a lobbyist for Qatar, and that "the person she frequently lobbies is ... her older brother and one of Qatar's biggest champions in Washington." Rahall said "our paths cross professionally, but not across any lines appropriately established by law or House rules." In May 2003, a year after his sister took on Qatar as a client, Rahall sponsored a resolution praising Qatar's "years of democratic reform"; according to one academic study from 2011, "For over three years, the country [Qatar] virtually had its own congressman in Washington, Nick Rahall (D-WV)".

In February 2005, Rahall used Congressional stationery to write a letter to a Fairfax County judge, David Stitt, asking for leniency for his son, Nick Rahall III, who was facing felony robbery charges. According to the House ethics manual: "Official stationery ... may be used only for official purposes." Rahall acknowledged that he should not have used Congressional stationery for his letter, but said it was not the same type that he uses for official or committee business. Rahall added he may have drawn the wrong paper "[i]n the emotions", and that he would reimburse the Treasury Department for the cost of the paper. The United States House Committee on Ethics did not launch an inquiry into the incident.

Rahall was one of seven Democrats and twelve Republicans listed by Citizens for Responsibility and Ethics in Washington in its annual "Most Corrupt Members of Congress Report" in 2011. Melanie Sloan, CREW's executive director, said: "Rep. Rahall abused his position to help his son and sister in clear violation of the House ethics rules." Rahall's spokeswoman said: "There is as little merit to these allegations today as there was then."

== Electoral history ==
West Virginia's 4th congressional district: Results 1976–90
Year	Democrat	Votes	%	Republican	Votes	%	Third Party	Party	Votes	%
1976	Nick Rahall	73,626	46%	E. S. Goodman	28,825	18%	Ken Hechler	Democratic (write-in)	59,067	37%
1978	Nick Rahall	70,035	100%	No candidate						
1980	Nick Rahall	117,595	77%	Winton Covey	36,020	23%				
1982	Nick Rahall	91,184	81%	Homer Harris	22,054	19%				
1984	Nick Rahall	98,919	67%	Jess Shumate	49,474	33%				
1986	Nick Rahall	58,217	71%	Martin Miller	23,490	29%				
1988	Nick Rahall	78,812	61%	Marianne Brewster	49,753	39%				
1990	Nick Rahall	39,948	52%	David Morrill	36,946	48%				

West Virginia's 3rd congressional district: Results 1992–2014
Year	Democrat	Votes	%	Republican	Votes	%	Third Party	Party	Votes	%
1992	Nick Rahall	122,279	66%	Ben Waldman	64,012	34%				
1994	Nick Rahall	74,967	64%	Ben Waldman	42,382	36%				
1996	Nick Rahall	145,550	100%	No candidate						
1998	Nick Rahall	78,814	87%	No candidate			Joe Whelan	Libertarian	12,196	13%
2000	Nick Rahall	146,807	91%	No candidate			Jeff Robinson	Libertarian	13,979	9%
2002	Nick Rahall	87,783	70%	Paul Chapman	37,229	30%				
2004	Nick Rahall	142,682	65%	Rick Snuffer	76,170	35%				
2006	Nick Rahall	92,413	69%	Kim Wolfe	40,820	31%				
2008	Nick Rahall	133,522	67%	Marty Gearheart	66,005	33%				
2010	Nick Rahall	83,636	56%	Spike Maynard	65,611	44%				
2012	Nick Rahall	108,199	54%	Rick Snuffer	92,238	46%				
2014	Nick Rahall	62,309	45%	Evan Jenkins	77,170	55%				

== Personal life ==
Rahall and his second wife, Melinda Ross of Ashland, Kentucky, married in 2004. They have three children from his previous marriage, and three grandchildren.

In 2008, Rahall appeared on an episode of Diners, Drive-Ins and Dives which featured Hillbilly Hot Dogs of Lesage, West Virginia. Rahall introduced the hot dog that's named after him on the menu, Rahall's Red Hot Weenie.

In July 2009, Rahall jumped out of a plane to show his support for the coal industry. The event was intended to show the importance of the coal industry to both West Virginia and the United States as a whole. The act confused some, who questioned the reasoning behind the jump. It was noted that Rahall is involved with coal lobbyists and also receives contributions from the airline industry.

After leaving office, he became involved in political reform efforts, including joining nine other former members of Congress to co-author a 2021 opinion editorial advocating reforms of Congress.

== See also ==
- List of Arab and Middle-Eastern Americans in the United States Congress

U.S. House of Representatives
Preceded by Ken Hechler	Member of the U.S. House of Representatives from West Virginia's 4th congressional district 1977–1993	Constituency abolished
Preceded by Bob Wise	Member of the U.S. House of Representatives from West Virginia's 3rd congressional district 1993–2015	Succeeded by Evan Jenkins
Preceded by George Miller	Ranking Member of the House Natural Resources Committee; 2001–2007	Succeeded by Don Young
Preceded by Richard Pombo	Chair of the House Natural Resources Committee; 2007–2011	Succeeded by Doc Hastings
Preceded by John Mica	Ranking Member of the House Transportation Committee; 2011–2015	Succeeded by Peter DeFazio
U.S. order of precedence (ceremonial)
Preceded by Henry Waxman as Former U.S. Representative	Order of precedence of the United States as Former U.S. Representative	Succeeded by Pete Visclosky as Former U.S. Representative
