= Jonathan Miller (West Virginia politician) =

American politician

Member of the West Virginia House of Delegates from the 53rd district
- Incumbent
- Assumed office January 10, 2007 - December 1, 2012
- Preceded by: Randy Smith (politician)

Personal details
- Born: May 24, 1984 (age 42)
- Party: Republican
- Education: High Point University

Jonathan Miller is a health insurance salesman and former Republican member of the West Virginia House of Delegates from Berkeley County.

== Early life, education, and early career ==
He is the son of Jim and Rita Miller; the family lived in Gerrardstown, West Virginia, then moved to Bunker Hill when he was young. Miller graduated from Musselman High School, then attended High Point University, earning a B.A. in political science. He works as a health insurance salesman and occasional substitute teacher.

== West Virginia legislature ==
=== Committee assignments ===
In 2006, Miller was elected as a member of the House of Delegates, where he served on the Health and Human Resources, Banking and Insurance, Government Organization, and Political Subdivisions Committees. He was re-elected in 2008 without opposition.

=== Affiliations ===
Miller is the West Virginia state co-chair of the conservative American Legislative Exchange Council (ALEC). He is also a member of The Heartland Institute, the Cato Institute, and the Club for Growth.

In June 2008, Miller was replaced on the Eastern Panhandle Regional Planning and Development Council (Region 9) because he had failed to attend a number of meetings.

== 2012 Congressional race ==
In May 2011, Miller announced that he would vacate his seat in the House of Delegates and enter the race for the Republican nomination for West Virginia's 2nd congressional district. He challenged current U.S. Congresswoman Shelley Moore Capito, who had announced her intentions to run for re-election. Miller expressed his religion being a factor in running, saying in a video: "I firmly believe that God has called me to run for this office now."

In May 2012, Miller would ultimately lose the primary race, with incumbent Shelley Moore Capito winning the nomination.
