= Ron Thompson (West Virginia politician) =

American politician

Member of the West Virginia House of Delegates from the 27th district
- In office 1994–2007

Personal details
- Born: November 6, 1966 (age 59) United States
- Party: Democratic

Ron Thompson (born November 6, 1966) is an American politician from the state of West Virginia. A Democrat, he served as a member of the West Virginia House of Delegates from 1994 to 2007, representing the state's 27th District in Raleigh County. Thompson is notable for his extended absence from the House of Delegates due to his bipolar disorder. Thompson announced his resignation from the House of Delegates in July 2007 citing the necessity of longer than expected medical care.
