= Robert S. Kiss =

American politician (1957–2021)

54th Speaker of the West Virginia House of Delegates
- In office 1997–2007
- Preceded by: Robert Charles Chambers
- Succeeded by: Rick Thompson

Member of the West Virginia House of Delegates from the 27th district
- In office 1988–2007

Personal details
- Born: November 27, 1957
- Died: November 5, 2021 (aged 63)
- Cause of death: Cancer
- Party: Democratic
- Profession: Politician

Robert S. Kiss (November 27, 1957 – November 5, 2021) was an American politician in the state of West Virginia. He was a member of the West Virginia House of Delegate between 1988 and 2007, serving as the 54th Speaker of the House for the Democratic Party between 1997 and 2007.

== Political career ==
Kiss was first elected to the state legislature in 1988, as a delegate from the 27th district. In 1990, he was appointed vice-chairman of the finance committee and assumed the chairmanship the following term. In 1996, the state Democratic party nominated him to serve as Speaker of the House for the 73rd legislature, a position which he won. He currently is tied for the longest speakership in the history of West Virginia, beaten only by his predecessor.

On January 27, 2002, Kiss met with U.S. President George W. Bush. When the conversation turned to Kiss’ five-month-old twin sons, President Bush remarked "I've been to war. I've raised twins. If I had a choice, I'd rather go to war." In 2004, he announced that he would not be running for a tenth term in the House of Delegates, and would retire as speaker in 2006.

== Death ==
Kiss died of cancer, at age 63, on November 5, 2021.
