= Rick Snuffer =

American politician

Member of the West Virginia House of Delegates from the 27th district
- In office December 1, 2010 – 2012

Personal details
- Born: July 31, 1961 (age 65) Beckley, West Virginia, U.S.
- Party: Republican
- Spouse: Lori Basham Snuffer
- Education: Beckley College
- Occupation: businessman

Richard Ray Snuffer (born July 31, 1961) served in the West Virginia House of Delegates from 2010 to 2012.

== Early life, education, and business career ==
Snuffer was born in 1961 in Beckley, West Virginia. He graduated the World of Faith Leadership and Bible Institute in 1985. He also attended Bluefield State University and is currently obtaining his master's degree from Marshall University.

He has been Vice President of WESCO Homes Inc. from 1971 to 2004. He also worked for Combined Insurance in 1979 and Metropolitan Life in 1982.

== West Virginia legislature ==
=== 2010 election ===
He ran for West Virginia's 27th House District. He was one of five candidates who won that seat, obtaining 13% of the vote in second place. The others were incumbent State Delegate Linda Sumner (14%), State Delegate Ricky Moye (12%), John David O'Neal (12%), and Virginia Mahan (9%).

=== Committee assignments ===
- Energy, Industry and Labor/Economic Development and Small Business
- Government Organization
- Roads and Transportation
- Senior Citizen Issues

== Campaigns for higher office ==
=== 2004 congressional election ===
In 2003, he decided to challenge incumbent Democrat U.S. Congressman Nick Rahall of West Virginia's 3rd congressional district. In the Republican primary, he defeated Marty Gearheart 58%-42%. In the general election, Rahall defeated Snuffer 65%-35%, a thirty-point margin. Rahall, first elected in 1976, fared worse in only five other elections. Snuffer won just one county, Raleigh, his home county by two points.

=== 2006 U.S. Senate election ===
Snuffer then decided to challenge incumbent Democrat U.S. Senator Robert C. Byrd. He lost the Republican primary, ranking third out of six candidates with just 6% of the vote. He won just one county, Raleigh, with 48%. Businessman John Raese won with 58% of the vote.

=== 2012 congressional election ===
Snuffer decided to challenge Rahall again in 2012. He won the Republican primary with 54% of the vote.
