= West Virginia Democratic Party =

West Virginia affiliate of the Democratic Party

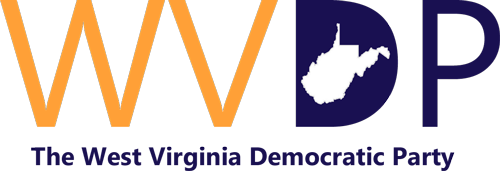
- Chairperson: Mike Pushkin
- Headquarters: Charleston, West Virginia
- Membership (2024): 355,630
- National affiliation: Democratic Party
- Colors: Blue
- U.S. Senate: 0 / 2
- U.S. House: 0 / 2
- Executive offices: 0 / 6
- Senate: 2 / 34
- House of Delegates: 9 / 100

Election symbol

Website
- wvdemocrats.com

The West Virginia Democratic Party is the affiliate of the Democratic Party in the U.S. state of West Virginia.

Although West Virginia was historically one of the most Democratic-voting states in the nation, the party has rapidly lost ground in the state in the 21st century. The party currently has very weak electoral power in the state, and is one of the weakest affiliates of the national Democratic Party. It controls no statewide or federal elected offices and holds very few seats in both houses of the state legislature.

Bill Clinton remains the last Democratic Presidential candidate to win the state, having done so in 1992 and 1996.

== History ==
The state of West Virginia granted itself statehood after its people, through a state constitutional convention, became a free state and broke away from the slave holding state of Virginia in 1861 during the first year of the Civil War. Article IV of the U.S. Constitution requires consent of the newly formed state, the original state, and Congress. The pro-Union Restored Government of Virginia had been recognized by Washington as the legitimate government of the entire Commonwealth, and quickly asserted its right to consent to the formation of the new state. After Congressional consent, self-statehood was gained and political party formation prospered.

The West Virginia Democratic Party was started as a coalition of conservative Pro-Union Democrats, Pro-Confederate Democrats, and former members of the Whig Party. After 1872, its political dominance flourished when restrictions that disenfranchised former Confederates were struck from the state constitution.

== Presidential Elections ==
| Election | Democratic Ticket | Total Vote | Voteshare | Result |
|---|---|---|---|---|
| 1932 | Franklin D. Roosevelt/John Nance Garner | 405,124 | 54.47% | Won |
| 1936 | Franklin D. Roosevelt/John Nance Garner | 502,582 | 60.56% | Won |
| 1940 | Franklin D. Roosevelt/Henry A. Wallace | 495,662 | 57.10% | Won |
| 1944 | Franklin D. Roosevelt/Harry S. Truman | 392,777 | 54.89% | Won |
| 1948 | Harry S. Truman/Alben W. Barkley | 429,188 | 57.32% | Won |
| 1952 | Adlai Stevenson II/John Sparkman | 453,578 | 51.92% | Won |
| 1956 | Adlai Stevenson II/Estes Kefauver | 381,534 | 45.92% | Lost |
| 1960 | John F. Kennedy/Lyndon B. Johnson | 441,786 | 52.73% | Won |
| 1964 | Lyndon B. Johnson/Hubert Humphrey | 538,087 | 67.94% | Won |
| 1968 | Hubert Humphrey/Edmund Muskie | 374,091 | 49.60% | Won |
| 1972 | George McGovern/Sargent Shriver | 277,435 | 36.39% | Lost |
| 1976 | Jimmy Carter/Walter Mondale | 435,914 | 58.07% | Won |
| 1980 | Jimmy Carter/Walter Mondale | 367,462 | 49.81% | Won |
| 1984 | Walter Mondale/Geraldine Ferraro | 328,125 | 44.60% | Lost |
| 1988 | Michael Dukakis/Lloyd Bentsen | 341,016 | 52.20% | Won |
| 1992 | Bill Clinton/Al Gore | 331,001 | 48.41% | Won |
| 1996 | Bill Clinton/Al Gore | 327,812 | 51.51% | Won |
| 2000 | Al Gore/Joe Lieberman | 295,497 | 45.59% | Lost |
| 2004 | John Kerry/John Edwards | 326,541 | 43.20% | Lost |
| 2008 | Barack Obama/Joe Biden | 303,857 | 42.49% | Lost |
| 2012 | Barack Obama/Joe Biden | 238,269 | 35.45% | Lost |
| 2016 | Hillary Clinton/Tim Kaine | 188,794 | 26.18% | Lost |
| 2020 | Joe Biden/Kamala Harris | 235,984 | 29.69% | Lost |
| 2024 | Kamala Harris/Tim Walz | 214,309 | 28.06% | Lost |

== West Virginia Democrats in government ==
The West Virginia Democratic Party holds minorities in both state legislative chambers. Democrats hold none of the state's U.S. House seats. Former governor Jim Justice was elected as a Democrat in 2016, but switched parties to Republican in August 2017. Senator Joe Manchin was West Virginia's only congressional Democrat from 2015 to 2024, and the state's only Democratic statewide officeholder from 2021 to 2024, before changing his party affiliation to independent.

=== Judicial (West Virginia Supreme Court of Appeals) ===
- Justice William R. Wooton

=== Mayors ===
- Charleston: Amy Shuler Goodwin (1)

== Democratic electorate ==
Democratic and Republican parties have dominated the American political scene for close to two centuries. In West Virginia, the Republican Union-supporting party held political power in the state from 1863 to 1872. The Democrats took power in the 1872 elections and held it until 1896. Republicans once again had control in 1896 until 1932. During the Great Depression, The Democratic Party began its dominance that lasted until 2014.

=== Democratic dominance in West Virginia in the 20th century ===
From 1930 to 2014, Democrats held majorities in both chambers of the West Virginia Legislature.

== Today's party organization ==
The party organization is governed by the West Virginia State Democratic Executive Committee. This committee comprises its leadership. The chair is Delegate Mike Pushkin and the First Vice Chair is Pam Tucker Cline.
