= 2022 West Virginia House of Delegates election =

2022 West Virginia House of Delegates elections
- November 8, 2022

All 100 seats in the West Virginia House of Delegates 51 seats needed for a majority
	Majority party	Minority party
	GOP	DEM
Leader	Roger Hanshaw	Doug Skaff
Party	Republican	Democratic
Leader since	August 29, 2018	November 30, 2020
Leader's seat	33rd (pre-election) 62nd (post-election)	35th (pre-election) 57th (post-election)
Last election	76 seats, 58.8%	24 seats, 40.5%
Seats before	78	22
Seats won	88	12
Seat change	▲10	▼10
Popular vote	316,588	138,747
Percentage	68.7%	30.1%
Swing	▲9.9%	▼10.4%
- Republican gain Democratic gain Republican hold Democratic hold 50–60% 60–70% 70–80% 80–90% >90% 50–60% 60–70% 70–80% >90%
Speaker before election
Roger Hanshaw
Republican
Elected Speaker
Roger Hanshaw
Republican

The 2022 West Virginia House of Delegates election was held on November 8, 2022, electing all 100 members of the chamber. This coincided with the election of 17 of West Virginia's 34 state senators, and the election of West Virginia's two U.S. representatives. Primary elections were held on May 10, 2022. Due to redistricting, this was the first House of Delegates election in which all members were elected from single member districts, with West Virginia following a trend of states phasing out multi-member districts in recent decades.

The Republican party won 88 seats, increasing their supermajority in the chamber. In early 2023, delegate Elliott Pritt switched his party affiliation from Democrat to Republican, increasing the party's seat count to 89.

== Background ==
In the 2020 House of Delegates election, the Republican Party gained almost 20 seats from the Democrats, achieving supermajority status. This has followed West Virginia's sharp turn towards the Republican Party in the preceding 20 years, and the Republicans' growing prominence in state politics. Between the 2020 and 2022 elections, two Democrats switched their party affiliation to Republican.

== Retiring incumbents ==
=== Democrats ===
Five Democrats retired.

1. District 5: Dave Pethtel retired.
2. District 20: Nathan Brown retired to run for Mingo County Commission.
3. District 34: Brent Boggs retired.
4. District 51: Barbara Fleischauer retired to run for state senator from District 13.
5. District 67: John Doyle retired to run for Jefferson County Commission.

=== Republicans ===
Nine Republicans retired.

1. District 10: John R. Kelly retired to run for state senator from District 3.
2. District 16: John Mandt retired to run for Cabell County Commission.
3. District 22: Zack Maynard retired.
4. District 25: Tony Paynter retired to run for Wyoming County Circuit Clerk.
5. District 30: Mick Bates retired to run for state senator from District 9.
6. District 32: Kayla Kessinger retired.
7. District 48: Ben Queen retired to run for state senator from District 12.
8. District 52: Terri Sypolt retired.
9. District 61: Jason Barrett retired to run for state senator from District 16.

== Predictions ==
Source	Ranking	As of
Sabato's Crystal Ball	Safe R	May 19, 2022

== Speakership election ==
On August 8, 2022, Brandon Steele, a Republican from Raleigh County, announced his intent to run for Speaker against incumbent Roger Hanshaw. House Democratic leader Doug Skaff stated on the Mountain State Views podcast that he and his caucus would support Hanshaw over Steele in a speakership contest.

On December 4, 2022, Hanshaw was chosen to lead the Republican caucus for another two years, winning with 53 votes to Steele's 30. In the Democratic caucus, Skaff was re-elected as minority leader.

On January 11, 2023, the 86th Legislature convened, and the election for Speaker was held. Republican David Kelly nominated Hanshaw, who was seconded by John Hardy, and Democrat Ric Griffith nominated Skaff, who was seconded by Shawn Fluharty.

Speakership election
Party	Candidate	Votes	%
Republican	Roger Hanshaw (incumbent)	87	87.9
Democratic	Doug Skaff	12	12.1
Total votes		99	100.0
Votes necessary		50	>50.0
Republican hold			

== Overview ==
↓
88	12
Republican	Dem.

2022 West Virginia House of Delegates election
Party	Races contested	Votes	Percentage	% change	Seats before	Seats after	+/–
Republican	99	316,588	68.68%	▲9.9%	78	88	▲10
Democratic	76	138,747	30.10%	▼10.4%	22	12	▼10
ACT	2	2,565	0.56%	▲0.5%	0	0	Steady
Independent	2	1,630	0.35%	▲0.2%	0	0	Steady
Mountain	2	641	0.14%	▼0.1%	0	0	Steady
Libertarian	2	548	0.12%	▼0.2%	0	0	Steady
Write-in	3	224	0.05%	—	100	100	—
Totals	100	460,943	100.00%	—	100	100	—
Turnout			39.95%	▼23.3%	100	100	—

=== Close races ===
Districts where the margin of victory was under 10%:

1. District 56, 1%
2. District 27, 1.6%
3. District 82, 2.6%
4. District 50, 3.6%
5. District 52, 4%
6. District 24, 5.2%
7. District 70, 7.6%
8. District 32, 9%
9. District 75, 9%
10. District 76, 9.2%
11. District 5, 9.2%
12. District 100, 9.6%
13. District 3, 9.8%

== Appointments ==
During West Virginia's 85th Legislature (2021–2022), several delegates resigned from their seats in the House of Delegates. According to §3-10-5 of West Virginia Code, vacancies in the House of Delegates are filled through appointment by the Governor of one of three candidates chosen by the executive committee of the outgoing member's party. Below is a list of appointments made during the 85th Legislature.

District	Incumbent		Party	Appointee	
District	Departing Member	First elected	Party	Incoming member	Appt. date
13	Joshua Higginbotham	2016	Rep	Kathie Hess Crouse	November 24, 2021
19	Derrick Evans	2020	Rep	Josh Booth	January 27, 2021
22	Joe Jeffries	2018	Rep	Jarred Cannon	June 14, 2022
28	Jeffrey Pack	2018 (appointed)	Rep	Jordan Maynor	August 19, 2021
35	Larry Pack	2020	Rep	Andrew Anderson	August 19, 2022
42	Barry Bruce	2020	Rep	Michael Honaker	December 21, 2021

== Incumbents defeated ==
=== In primaries ===
==== Democrats ====
1. District 27: Chad Lovejoy lost renomination to fellow incumbent Ric Griffith in a redistricting race.

==== Republicans ====
1. District 11: Roger Conley lost renomination to Bob Fehrenbacher.
2. District 14: Shannon Kimes lost renomination to Dave Foggin.
3. District 18: Johnnie Wamsley lost renomination to Jim Butler.
4. District 28: Josh Booth lost renomination to Mark Ross.
5. District 59: Dianna Graves lost renomination to Andy Shamblin.
6. District 69: Danny Hamrick lost renomination to Keith Marple.
7. District 74: Guy Ward lost renomination to Mike DeVault.
8. District 89: Ruth Rowan lost renomination to Darren Thorne.
9. District 90: Ken Reed lost renomination to fellow incumbent George A. Miller in a redistricting race.

=== In general elections ===
==== Democrats ====
1. District 3: Phillip DiSerio lost re-election to Jimmy Willis.
2. District 7: Lisa Zukoff lost re-election to Charles Sheedy.
3. District 36: Ed Evans lost re-election to Anita Hall.
4. District 67: Cody Thompson lost re-election to Elias Coop-Gonzalez

==== Republicans ====
1. District 50: Austin Haynes lost re-election to David Pritt.
2. District 56: Andrew Anderson lost election to incumbent Kayla Young.

== List of districts ==
=== District 1 ===
Incumbent Pat McGeehan was first elected in 2014.

Republican primary results
Party	Candidate	Votes	%
Republican	Pat McGeehan (incumbent)	2,022	100.0
Total votes		2,022	100.0

Democratic primary results
Party	Candidate	Votes	%
Democratic	Jack Wood	1,056	100.0
Total votes		1,056	100.0

==== General election ====
West Virginia's 1st House of Delegates district, 2022
Party	Candidate	Votes	%
Republican	Pat McGeehan (incumbent)	4,590	75.8
Democratic	Jack Wood	1,462	24.2
Total votes		6,052	100.0
Republican win (new boundaries)			

=== District 2 ===
Incumbent Mark Zatezalo was first elected in 2014, left the House of Delegates in 2018, and was elected again in 2020.

Republican primary results
Party	Candidate	Votes	%
Republican	Mark Zatezalo (incumbent)	1,263	100.0
Total votes		1,263	100.0

Democratic primary results
Party	Candidate	Votes	%
Democratic	Ronnie Jones	927	100.0
Total votes		927	100.0

==== General election ====
West Virginia's 2nd House of Delegates district, 2022
Party	Candidate	Votes	%
Republican	Mark Zatezalo (incumbent)	3,406	67.2
Democratic	Ronnie Jones	1,663	32.8
Total votes		5,069	100.0
Republican win (new boundaries)			

=== District 3 ===
Incumbent Phillip Diserio was first elected in 2012, left the House of Delegates in 2014, and was elected again in 2016.

Republican primary results
Party	Candidate	Votes	%
Republican	Jimmy Willis	1,181	100.0
Total votes		1,181	100.0

Democratic primary results
Party	Candidate	Votes	%
Democratic	Phillip Diserio (incumbent)	1,190	100.0
Total votes		1,190	100.0

==== General election ====
West Virginia's 3rd House of Delegates district, 2022
Party	Candidate	Votes	%
Republican	Jimmy Willis	2,895	54.9
Democratic	Phillip Diserio (incumbent)	2,379	45.1
Total votes		5,274	100.0
Republican win (new boundaries)			

=== District 4 ===
Incumbent Erikka Storch was first elected in 2010.

Republican primary results
Party	Candidate	Votes	%
Republican	Erikka Storch (incumbent)	2,020	100.0
Total votes		2,020	100.0

Democratic primary results
Party	Candidate	Votes	%
Democratic	Teresa Toriseva	987	100.0
Total votes		987	100.0

==== General election ====
West Virginia's 4th House of Delegates district, 2022
Party	Candidate	Votes	%
Republican	Erikka Storch (incumbent)	4,811	72.6
Democratic	Teresa Toriseva	1,812	27.4
Total votes		6,623	100.0
Republican win (new boundaries)			

=== District 5 ===
Incumbent Shawn Fluharty was first elected in 2014.

Republican primary results
Party	Candidate	Votes	%
Republican	Brooke McArdle	1,037	100.0
Total votes		1,037	100.0

Democratic primary results
Party	Candidate	Votes	%
Democratic	Shawn Fluharty (incumbent)	1,203	100.0
Total votes		1,203	100.0

==== General election ====
West Virginia's 5th House of Delegates district, 2022
Party	Candidate	Votes	%
Democratic	Shawn Fluharty (incumbent)	2,758	54.6
Republican	Brooke McArdle	2,294	45.4
Total votes		5,052	100.0
Democratic win (new boundaries)			

=== District 6 ===
Incumbent Charlie Reynolds was first elected in 2020.

Republican primary results
Party	Candidate	Votes	%
Republican	Charlie Reynolds (incumbent)	1,525	100.0
Total votes		1,525	100.0

Democratic primary results
Party	Candidate	Votes	%
Democratic	Reva Yost	1,115	100.0
Total votes		1,115	100.0

==== General election ====
West Virginia's 6th House of Delegates district, 2022
Party	Candidate	Votes	%
Republican	Charlie Reynolds (incumbent)	3,550	61.3
Democratic	Reva Yost	2,243	38.7
Total votes		5,793	100.0

=== District 7 ===
Incumbent Lisa Zukoff was first elected in 2018.

Republican primary results
Party	Candidate	Votes	%
Republican	Charles Sheedy	1,122	100.0
Total votes		1,122	100.0

Democratic primary results
Party	Candidate	Votes	%
Democratic	Lisa Zukoff (incumbent)	994	100.0
Total votes		994	100.0

Mountain Party primary results
Party	Candidate	Votes	%
Mountain	Dylan Parsons	8	100.0
Total votes		8	100.0

==== General election ====
West Virginia's 7th House of Delegates district, 2022
Party	Candidate	Votes	%
Republican	Charles Sheedy	2,948	54.9
Democratic	Lisa Zukoff (incumbent)	2,066	38.5
Mountain	Dylan Parsons	356	6.6
Total votes		5,370	100.0
Republican win (new boundaries)			

=== District 8 ===
Incumbent David Kelly was first elected in 2018.

Republican primary results
Party	Candidate	Votes	%
Republican	David Kelly (incumbent)	1,678	74.3
Republican	Dave Shelton	581	25.7
Total votes		2,259	100.0

==== General election ====
West Virginia's 8th House of Delegates district, 2022
Party	Candidate	Votes	%
Republican	David Kelly (incumbent)	4,509	100.0
Total votes		4,509	100.0
Republican win (new boundaries)			

=== District 9 ===
Incumbent Trenton Barnhart was appointed in 2019.

Republican primary results
Party	Candidate	Votes	%
Republican	Trenton Barnhart (incumbent)	2,333	100.0
Total votes		2,333	100.0

==== General election ====
West Virginia's 9th House of Delegates district, 2022
Party	Candidate	Votes	%
Republican	Trenton Barnhart (incumbent)	5,059	100.0
Total votes		5,059	100.0
Republican win (new boundaries)			

=== District 10 ===
Incumbent William Anderson was first elected in 1992.

Republican primary results
Party	Candidate	Votes	%
Republican	William Anderson (incumbent)	1,896	100.0
Total votes		1,896	100.0

Democratic primary results
Party	Candidate	Votes	%
Democratic	Morgan Leach	674	100.0
Total votes		674	100.0

==== General election ====
West Virginia's 10th House of Delegates district, 2022
Party	Candidate	Votes	%
Republican	William Anderson (incumbent)	4,133	70.8
Democratic	Morgan Leach	1,702	29.2
Total votes		5,835	100.0
Republican win (new boundaries)			

=== District 11 ===
Incumbent Roger Conley was first elected in 2020. Conley lost the Republican primary to Bob Fehrenbacher.

Republican primary results
Party	Candidate	Votes	%
Republican	Bob Fehrenbacher	1,149	50.2
Republican	Roger Conley (incumbent)	1,139	49.8
Total votes		2,288	100.0

Democratic primary results
Party	Candidate	Votes	%
Democratic	Harry Deitzler	916	100.0
Total votes		916	100.0

==== General election ====
West Virginia's 11th House of Delegates district, 2022
Party	Candidate	Votes	%
Republican	Bob Fehrenbacher	3,274	59.0
Democratic	Harry Deitzler	2,280	41.0
Total votes		5,554	100.0
Republican win (new boundaries)			

=== District 12 ===
Incumbent Vernon Criss was first elected in 2016.

Republican primary results
Party	Candidate	Votes	%
Republican	Vernon Criss (incumbent)	1,125	100.0
Total votes		1,125	100.0

Democratic primary results
Party	Candidate	Votes	%
Democratic	Jonathan Defibaugh	622	100.0
Total votes		622	100.0

==== General election ====
West Virginia's 12th House of Delegates district, 2022
Party	Candidate	Votes	%
Republican	Vernon Criss (incumbent)	2,467	62.3
Democratic	Jonathan Defibaugh	1,196	30.2
Libertarian	Stephen Thomas Smith	295	7.5
Total votes		3,958	100.0
Republican win (new boundaries)			

=== District 13 ===
Republican primary results
Party	Candidate	Votes	%
Republican	Scot Heckert	1,376	100.0
Total votes		1,376	100.0

==== General election ====
West Virginia's 13th House of Delegates district, 2022
Party	Candidate	Votes	%
Republican	Scot Heckert	3,304	72.1
Democratic	Andrea Greer	1,281	27.9
Total votes		4,585	100.0
Republican win (new boundaries)			

=== District 14 ===
Incumbent Shannon Kimes was first elected in 2020. Kimes lost the Republican primary to Dave Foggin.

Republican primary results
Party	Candidate	Votes	%
Republican	Dave Foggin	856	37.3
Republican	Shannon Kimes (incumbent)	821	35.8
Republican	Kevin Siers	618	26.9
Total votes		2,295	100.0

Democratic primary results
Party	Candidate	Votes	%
Democratic	Jim Marion	616	100.0
Total votes		616	100.0

==== General election ====
West Virginia's 14th House of Delegates district, 2022
Party	Candidate	Votes	%
Republican	Dave Foggin	4,231	76.3
Democratic	Jim Marion	1,315	23.7
Total votes		5,546	100.0
Republican win (new boundaries)			

=== District 15 ===
Incumbent Riley Keaton was first elected in 2020.

Republican primary results
Party	Candidate	Votes	%
Republican	Riley Keaton (incumbent)	992	55.6
Republican	Martin Atkinson	792	44.4
Total votes		1,784	100.0

==== General election ====
West Virginia's 15th House of Delegates district, 2022
Party	Candidate	Votes	%
Republican	Riley Keaton (incumbent)	3,449	69.9
Democratic	Chuck Conner	1,483	30.1
Total votes		4,932	100.0
Republican win (new boundaries)			

=== District 16 ===
Incumbent Steve Westfall was first elected in 2012.

Republican primary results
Party	Candidate	Votes	%
Republican	Steve Westfall (incumbent)	1,950	100.0
Total votes		1,950	100.0

==== General election ====
West Virginia's 16th House of Delegates district, 2022
Party	Candidate	Votes	%
Republican	Steve Westfall (incumbent)	4,648	97.2
Write-in		133	2.8
Total votes		4,781	100.0
Republican win (new boundaries)			

=== District 17 ===
Incumbent Jonathan Pinson was first elected in 2020.

Republican primary results
Party	Candidate	Votes	%
Republican	Jonathan Pinson (incumbent)	1,391	79.8
Republican	Morgan Hurlow	212	12.2
Republican	Robert Marchal	140	8.0
Total votes		1,743	100.0

==== General election ====
West Virginia's 17th House of Delegates district, 2022
Party	Candidate	Votes	%
Republican	Jonathan Pinson (incumbent)	4,083	100.0
Total votes		4,083	100.0
Republican win (new boundaries)			

=== District 18 ===
Incumbent Johnnie Wamsley was first elected in 2020. Wamsley lost the Republican primary to Jim Butler.

Republican primary results
Party	Candidate	Votes	%
Republican	Jim Butler	956	56.8
Republican	Johnnie Wamsley (incumbent)	726	43.2
Total votes		1,682	100.0

==== General election ====
West Virginia's 18th House of Delegates district, 2022
Party	Candidate	Votes	%
Republican	Jim Butler	3,476	100.0
Total votes		3,476	100.0

=== District 19 ===
Incumbent Kathie Hess Crouse was appointed in 2021.

Republican primary results
Party	Candidate	Votes	%
Republican	Kathie Hess Crouse (incumbent)	816	44.3
Republican	Jesse Lovejoy	518	28.1
Republican	Nick Withrow	507	27.5
Total votes		1,841	100.0

Democratic primary results
Party	Candidate	Votes	%
Democratic	Seth King	377	50.6
Democratic	Josh Martin	368	49.4
Total votes		745	100.0

==== General election ====
West Virginia's 19th House of Delegates district, 2022
Party	Candidate	Votes	%
Republican	Kathie Hess Crouse (incumbent)	3,082	60.3
Democratic	Seth King	2,032	39.7
Total votes		5,114	100.0
Republican win (new boundaries)			

=== District 20 ===
Incumbent Geoff Foster was first elected in 2014.

Republican primary results
Party	Candidate	Votes	%
Republican	Geoff Foster (incumbent)	1,190	52.6
Republican	Jacob Losh	1,073	47.4
Total votes		2,263	100.0

==== General election ====
West Virginia's 20th House of Delegates district, 2022
Party	Candidate	Votes	%
Republican	Geoff Foster (incumbent)	4,126	100.0
Total votes		4,126	100.0

=== District 21 ===
Incumbent Jarred Cannon was appointed to fill the vacancy left by Joe Jeffries' resignation in June 2022, one month after Cannon won the Republican primary for District 21.

Republican primary results
Party	Candidate	Votes	%
Republican	Jarred Cannon	807	48.1
Republican	Michael Kidd	555	33.1
Republican	Branden Long	316	18.8
Total votes		1,678	100.0

Democratic primary results
Party	Candidate	Votes	%
Democratic	Theresa Jackson	578	100.0
Total votes		578	100.0

==== General election ====
West Virginia's 21st House of Delegates district, 2022
Party	Candidate	Votes	%
Republican	Jarred Cannon (incumbent)	3,502	68.1
Democratic	Theresa Jackson	1,640	31.9
Total votes		5,142	100.0
Republican win (new boundaries)			

=== District 22 ===
Incumbent Daniel Linville was first elected in 2020.

Republican primary results
Party	Candidate	Votes	%
Republican	Daniel Linville (incumbent)	970	80.5
Republican	Roy Ramey	235	19.5
Total votes		1,205	100.0

==== General election ====
West Virginia's 22nd House of Delegates district, 2022
Party	Candidate	Votes	%
Republican	Daniel Linville (incumbent)	3,495	100.0
Total votes		3,495	100.0
Republican win (new boundaries)			

=== District 23 ===
Incumbent Evan Worrell was first elected in 2018.

Republican primary results
Party	Candidate	Votes	%
Republican	Evan Worrell (incumbent)	787	60.3
Republican	Jodi Biller	519	39.7
Total votes		1,306	100.0

Democratic primary results
Party	Candidate	Votes	%
Democratic	Karen Nance	473	69.0
Democratic	Paul Ross	213	31.0
Total votes		686	100.0

West Virginia's 23rd House of Delegates district, 2022
Party	Candidate	Votes	%
Republican	Evan Worrell (incumbent)	3,028	68.2
Democratic	Karen Nance	1,413	31.8
Total votes		4,441	100.0
Republican win (new boundaries)			

=== District 24 ===
Republican primary results
Party	Candidate	Votes	%
Republican	Patrick Lucas	511	65.3
Republican	Tyler Haslam	271	34.7
Total votes		782	100.0

Democratic primary results
Party	Candidate	Votes	%
Democratic	Ally Layman	518	63.6
Democratic	Carl Eastham	297	36.4
Total votes		815	100.0

==== General election ====
West Virginia's 24th House of Delegates district, 2022
Party	Candidate	Votes	%
Republican	Patrick Lucas	1,914	52.6
Democratic	Ally Layman	1,724	47.4
Total votes		3,638	100.0
Republican win (new boundaries)			

=== District 25 ===
Incumbent Sean Hornbuckle was first elected in 2014.

Democratic primary results
Party	Candidate	Votes	%
Democratic	Sean Hornbuckle (incumbent)	848	100.0
Total votes		848	100.0

==== General election ====
West Virginia's 25th House of Delegates district, 2022
Party	Candidate	Votes	%
Democratic	Sean Hornbuckle (incumbent)	2,652	100.0
Total votes		2,652	100.0
Democratic win (new boundaries)			

=== District 26 ===
Incumbent Matthew Rohrbach was first elected in 2014.

Republican primary results
Party	Candidate	Votes	%
Republican	Matthew Rohrbach (incumbent)	980	100.0
Total votes		980	100.0

Democratic primary results
Party	Candidate	Votes	%
Democratic	Sydnee McElroy	776	76.0
Democratic	Kate White	245	24.0
Total votes		1,021	100.0

==== General election ====
West Virginia's 26th House of Delegates district, 2022
Party	Candidate	Votes	%
Republican	Matthew Rohrbach (incumbent)	2,877	56.7
Democratic	Sydnee McElroy	2,199	43.3
Total votes		5,076	100.0
Republican win (new boundaries)			

=== District 27 ===
Incumbent Chad Lovejoy was elected in 2016. Incumbent Ric Griffith was elected in 2020. Griffith defeated Lovejoy in the Democratic primary caused by redistricting.

Republican primary results
Party	Candidate	Votes	%
Republican	Jeff Maynard	678	100.0
Total votes		678	100.0

Democratic primary results
Party	Candidate	Votes	%
Democratic	Ric Griffith (incumbent)	536	54.8
Democratic	Chad Lovejoy (incumbent)	442	45.2
Total votes		978	100.0

==== General election ====
West Virginia's 27th House of Delegates district, 2022
Party	Candidate	Votes	%
Democratic	Ric Griffith (incumbent)	2,064	50.8
Republican	Jeff Maynard	1,995	49.2
Total votes		4,059	100.0
Democratic win (new boundaries)			

=== District 28 ===
Incumbent Josh Booth was appointed in 2021. Booth lost the Republican primary to Mark Ross.

Republican primary results
Party	Candidate	Votes	%
Republican	Mark Ross	701	50.3
Republican	Josh Booth (incumbent)	692	49.7
Total votes		1,393	100.0

==== General election ====
West Virginia's 28th House of Delegates district, 2022
Party	Candidate	Votes	%
Republican	Mark Ross	3,943	100.0
Total votes		3,943	100.0
Republican win (new boundaries)			

=== District 29 ===
Republican primary results
Party	Candidate	Votes	%
Republican	Henry Dillon	513	52.3
Republican	Matthew Deskins	296	30.2
Republican	Nate Randolph	171	17.4
Total votes		980	100.0

Democratic primary results
Party	Candidate	Votes	%
Democratic	David Thompson	856	100.0
Total votes		856	100.0

==== General election ====
West Virginia's 29th House of Delegates district, 2022
Party	Candidate	Votes	%
Republican	Henry Dillon	2,290	60.8
Democratic	David Thompson	1,476	39.2
Total votes		3,766	100.0
Republican win (new boundaries)			

=== District 30 ===
Republican primary results
Party	Candidate	Votes	%
Republican	David Adkins	733	66.8
Republican	Cecil Silva	365	33.2
Total votes		1,098	100.0

Democratic primary results
Party	Candidate	Votes	%
Democratic	Deidra Roberts	1,060	79.6
Democratic	Roger May	272	20.4
Total votes		1,332	100.0

==== General election ====
West Virginia's 30th House of Delegates district, 2022
Party	Candidate	Votes	%
Republican	David Adkins	2,542	56.3
Democratic	Deidra Roberts	1,974	43.7
Total votes		4,516	100.0
Republican win (new boundaries)			

=== District 31 ===
Incumbent Margitta Mazzocchi was first elected in 2020.

Republican primary results
Party	Candidate	Votes	%
Republican	Margitta Mazzocchi (incumbent)	481	48.5
Republican	Jill Barker	387	39.1
Republican	Haskel Boytek	123	12.4
Total votes		991	100.0

Democratic primary results
Party	Candidate	Votes	%
Democratic	Kenneth Ray Wilson	662	100.0
Total votes		662	100.0

==== General election ====
West Virginia's 31st House of Delegates district, 2022
Party	Candidate	Votes	%
Republican	Margitta Mazzocchi (incumbent)	2,322	61.0
Democratic	Kenneth Ray Wilson	1,110	29.1
Independent	Brannon Akers	377	9.9
Total votes		3,809	100.0
Republican win (new boundaries)			

=== District 32 ===
Incumbent Josh Holstein was first elected in 2020.

Republican primary results
Party	Candidate	Votes	%
Republican	Josh Holstein (incumbent)	833	100.0
Total votes		833	100.0

Democratic primary results
Party	Candidate	Votes	%
Democratic	Rodney Miller	1,363	100.0
Total votes		1,363	100.0

==== General election ====
West Virginia's 32nd House of Delegates district, 2022
Party	Candidate	Votes	%
Republican	Josh Holstein (incumbent)	2,619	54.5
Democratic	Rodney Miller	2,183	45.5
Total votes		4,802	100.0
Republican win (new boundaries)			

=== District 33 ===
Incumbent Jordan Bridges was first elected in 2020.

Republican primary results
Party	Candidate	Votes	%
Republican	Jordan Bridges (incumbent)	856	100.0
Total votes		856	100.0

Democratic primary results
Party	Candidate	Votes	%
Democratic	George Howes	633	100.0
Total votes		633	100.0

West Virginia's 33rd House of Delegates district, 2022
Party	Candidate	Votes	%
Republican	Jordan Bridges (incumbent)	2,540	68.4
Democratic	George Howes	1,174	31.6
Total votes		3,714	100.0
Republican win (new boundaries)			

=== District 34 ===
Incumbent Mark Dean was first elected in 2016.

Republican primary results
Party	Candidate	Votes	%
Republican	Mark Dean (incumbent)	689	51.5
Republican	John White	648	48.5
Total votes		1,337	100.0

Democratic primary results
Party	Candidate	Votes	%
Democratic	Mark Colegrove	800	100.0
Total votes		800	100.0

==== General election ====
West Virginia's 34th House of Delegates district, 2022
Party	Candidate	Votes	%
Republican	Mark Dean (incumbent)	2,736	66.9
Democratic	Mark Colegrove	1,352	33.1
Total votes		4,088	100.0
Republican win (new boundaries)			

=== District 35 ===
Republican primary results
Party	Candidate	Votes	%
Republican	Adam Vance	1,228	100.0
Total votes		1,228	100.0

Democratic primary results
Party	Candidate	Votes	%
Democratic	Dewey Houck	835	60.0
Democratic	Mark Blackwell	557	40.0
Total votes		1,392	100.0

==== General election ====
West Virginia's 35th House of Delegates district, 2022
Party	Candidate	Votes	%
Republican	Adam Vance	2,605	72.1
Democratic	Dewey Huock	1,007	27.9
Total votes		3,612	100.0
Republican win (new boundaries)			

=== District 36 ===
Incumbent Ed Evans was first elected in 2016.

In the close District 36 Republican primary, Tom Acosta, who held a one-vote lead in election night returns, was defeated by the same margin by Anita Hall after canvassing.

Republican primary results
Party	Candidate	Votes	%
Republican	Anita Hall	248	50.1
Republican	Tom Acosta	247	49.9
Total votes		495	100.0

Democratic primary results
Party	Candidate	Votes	%
Democratic	Ed Evans (incumbent)	1,162	100.0
Total votes		1,162	100.0

==== General election ====
West Virginia's 36th House of Delegates district, 2022
Party	Candidate	Votes	%
Republican	Anita Hall	1,966	59.6
Democratic	Ed Evans (incumbent)	1,333	40.4
Total votes		3,299	100.0
Republican win (new boundaries)			

=== District 37 ===
Incumbent Marty Gearheart was first elected in 2020.

Republican primary results
Party	Candidate	Votes	%
Republican	Marty Gearheart (incumbent)	797	100.0
Total votes		797	100.0

Democratic primary results
Party	Candidate	Votes	%
Democratic	M.C. Crane	479	100.0
Total votes		479	100.0

==== General election ====
West Virginia's 37th House of Delegates district, 2022
Party	Candidate	Votes	%
Republican	Marty Gearheart (incumbent)	2,552	62.1
Democratic	M.C. Crane	1,555	37.9
Total votes		4,107	100.0
Republican win (new boundaries)			

=== District 38 ===
Incumbent Joe Ellington was first elected in 2010.

Republican primary results
Party	Candidate	Votes	%
Republican	Joe Ellington (incumbent)	959	100.0
Total votes		959	100.0

Democratic primary results
Party	Candidate	Votes	%
Democratic	Tina Russell	488	100.0
Total votes		488	100.0

==== General election ====
West Virginia's 38th House of Delegates district, 2022
Party	Candidate	Votes	%
Republican	Joe Ellington (incumbent)	3,204	74.1
Democratic	Tina Russell	1,117	25.9
Total votes		4,321	100.0
Republican win (new boundaries)			

=== District 39 ===
Incumbent Doug Smith was first elected in 2020.

Republican primary results
Party	Candidate	Votes	%
Republican	Doug Smith (incumbent)	1,133	100.0
Total votes		1,133	100.0

==== General election ====
West Virginia's 39th House of Delegates district, 2022
Party	Candidate	Votes	%
Republican	Doug Smith (incumbent)	3,992	100.0
Total votes		3,992	100.0
Republican win (new boundaries)			

=== District 40 ===
Incumbent Roy Cooper was first elected in 2012.

Republican primary results
Party	Candidate	Votes	%
Republican	Roy Cooper (incumbent)	1,732	100.0
Total votes		1,732	100.0

==== General election ====
West Virginia's 40th House of Delegates district, 2022
Party	Candidate	Votes	%
Republican	Roy Cooper (incumbent)	4,057	67.2
Democratic	Becky Crabtree	1,731	28.6
Libertarian	Jonathon Fain	253	4.2
Total votes		6,041	100.0
Republican win (new boundaries)			

=== District 41 ===
Incumbent Jordan Maynor was appointed in 2021.

Republican primary results
Party	Candidate	Votes	%
Republican	Jordan Maynor (incumbent)	1,327	65.8
Republican	Greg Shamblin	691	34.2
Total votes		2,018	100.0

==== General election ====
West Virginia's 41st House of Delegates district, 2022
Party	Candidate	Votes	%
Republican	Jordan Maynor (incumbent)	4,908	100.0
Total votes		4,908	100.0
Republican win (new boundaries)			

=== District 42 ===
Incumbent Brandon Steele was first elected in 2018.

Republican primary results
Party	Candidate	Votes	%
Republican	Brandon Steele (incumbent)	1,336	100.0
Total votes		1,336	100.0

==== General election ====
West Virginia's 42nd House of Delegates district, 2022
Party	Candidate	Votes	%
Republican	Brandon Steele (incumbent)	3,956	100.0
Total votes		3,956	100.0
Republican win (new boundaries)			

=== District 43 ===
Incumbent Christopher Toney was first elected in 2018.

Republican primary results
Party	Candidate	Votes	%
Republican	Christopher Toney (incumbent)	871	50.8
Republican	Kase Poling	842	49.2
Total votes		1,713	100.0

Democratic primary results
Party	Candidate	Votes	%
Democratic	JoAnna Vance	622	100.0
Total votes		622	100.0

==== General election ====
West Virginia's 43rd House of Delegates district, 2022
Party	Candidate	Votes	%
Republican	Christopher Toney (incumbent)	3,548	81.9
Democratic	JoAnna Vance	785	18.1
Total votes		4,333	100.0
Republican win (new boundaries)			

=== District 44 ===
Republican primary results
Party	Candidate	Votes	%
Republican	Todd Kirby	513	41.4
Republican	Ann Worley	431	34.8
Republican	Tom Moseley	294	23.8
Total votes		1,238	100.0

Democratic primary results
Party	Candidate	Votes	%
Democratic	Tony Martin	699	58.4
Democratic	Russell Wooton	379	31.7
Democratic	Mark Montgomery	119	9.9
Total votes		1,197	100.0

==== General election ====
West Virginia's 44th House of Delegates district, 2022
Party	Candidate	Votes	%
Republican	Todd Kirby	2,452	55.1
Democratic	Tony Martin	1,998	44.9
Total votes		4,450	100.0
Republican win (new boundaries)			

=== District 45 ===
Republican primary results
Party	Candidate	Votes	%
Republican	Eric Brooks	594	51.9
Republican	Ron Hedrick	551	48.1
Total votes		1,145	100.0

Democratic primary results
Party	Candidate	Votes	%
Democratic	Christian Martine	367	48.1
Democratic	Joseph Golden	266	34.9
Democratic	Kevin Walker	130	17.0
Total votes		763	100.0

==== General election ====
West Virginia's 45th House of Delegates district, 2022
Party	Candidate	Votes	%
Republican	Eric Brooks	2,516	65.1
Democratic	Christian Martine	1,349	34.9
Total votes		3,865	100.0
Republican win (new boundaries)			

=== District 46 ===
Incumbent Michael Honaker was appointed in 2021.

Republican primary results
Party	Candidate	Votes	%
Republican	Michael Honaker (incumbent)	967	51.7
Republican	Karen McCoy	739	39.5
Republican	Mark Robinson	163	8.7
Total votes		1,869	100.0

Democratic primary results
Party	Candidate	Votes	%
Democratic	Paul Detch	681	66.3
Democratic	Joe Holt	347	33.7
Total votes		1,028	100.0

==== General election ====
West Virginia's 46th House of Delegates district, 2022
Party	Candidate	Votes	%
Republican	Michael Honaker (incumbent)	4,106	66.3
Democratic	Paul Detch	2,083	33.7
Total votes		6,189	100.0
Republican win (new boundaries)			

=== District 47 ===
Incumbent Todd Longanacre was first elected in 2020.

Republican primary results
Party	Candidate	Votes	%
Republican	Todd Longanacre (incumbent)	1,435	100.0
Total votes		1,435	100.0

Democratic primary results
Party	Candidate	Votes	%
Democratic	Heather Hill	650	100.0
Total votes		650	100.0

==== General election ====
West Virginia's 47th House of Delegates district, 2022
Party	Candidate	Votes	%
Republican	Todd Longanacre (incumbent)	3,704	63.8
Democratic	Heather Hill	2,100	36.2
Total votes		5,804	100.0
Republican win (new boundaries)			

=== District 48 ===
Incumbent Caleb Hanna was first elected in 2018.

Republican primary results
Party	Candidate	Votes	%
Republican	Caleb Hanna (incumbent)	1,184	100.0
Total votes		1,184	100.0

Democratic primary results
Party	Candidate	Votes	%
Democratic	Eric Sebert	812	100.0
Total votes		812	100.0

==== General election ====
West Virginia's 48th House of Delegates district, 2022
Party	Candidate	Votes	%
Republican	Caleb Hanna (incumbent)	2,886	70.7
Democratic	Eric Sebert	1,193	29.3
Total votes		4,079	100.0
Republican win (new boundaries)			

=== District 49 ===
Incumbent Heather Tully was first elected in 2020.

Republican primary results
Party	Candidate	Votes	%
Republican	Heather Tully (incumbent)	1,575	100.0
Total votes		1,575	100.0

==== General election ====
West Virginia's 49th House of Delegates district, 2022
Party	Candidate	Votes	%
Republican	Heather Tully (incumbent)	3,814	100.0
Total votes		3,814	100.0
Republican win (new boundaries)			

=== District 50 ===
Incumbent Austin Haynes was first elected in 2020, and defeated by Democrat David Elliott Pritt in 2022. Pritt later changed his party affiliation to Republican, increasing the GOP's House majority to 89.

Republican primary results
Party	Candidate	Votes	%
Republican	Austin Haynes (incumbent)	635	100.0
Total votes		635	100.0

Democratic primary results
Party	Candidate	Votes	%
Democratic	Elliott Pritt	786	100.0
Total votes		786	100.0

==== General election ====
West Virginia's 50th House of Delegates district, 2022
Party	Candidate	Votes	%
Democratic	Elliott Pritt	1,892	51.8
Republican	Austin Haynes (incumbent)	1,759	48.2
Total votes		3,651	100.0
Democratic win (new boundaries)			

=== District 51 ===
Incumbent Tom Fast was first elected in 2020.

Republican primary results
Party	Candidate	Votes	%
Republican	Tom Fast (incumbent)	702	57.8
Republican	Dan Hill	512	42.2
Total votes		1,214	100.0

Democratic primary results
Party	Candidate	Votes	%
Democratic	Gabe Pena	809	66.8
Democratic	Robin Welch	402	33.2
Total votes		1,211	100.0

==== General election ====
West Virginia's 51st House of Delegates district, 2022
Party	Candidate	Votes	%
Republican	Tom Fast (incumbent)	2,900	58.6
Democratic	Gabe Pena	2,045	41.4
Total votes		4,945	100.0
Republican win (new boundaries)			

=== District 52 ===
Incumbent Larry Rowe was first elected in 1996, before leaving the chamber and returning in 2014.

Republican primary results
Party	Candidate	Votes	%
Republican	Greg Hendricks	576	100.0
Total votes		576	100.0

Democratic primary results
Party	Candidate	Votes	%
Democratic	Larry Rowe (incumbent)	1,140	100.0
Total votes		1,140	100.0

==== General election ====
West Virginia's 52nd House of Delegates district, 2022
Party	Candidate	Votes	%
Democratic	Larry Rowe (incumbent)	2,287	52.0
Republican	Greg Hendricks	2,111	48.0
Total votes		4,398	100.0
Democratic win (new boundaries)			

=== District 53 ===
Incumbents Jim Barach and Chris Pritt were first elected in 2020. After winning the Democratic primary, Barach chose not to seek re-election, and he was replaced by Wayne Crozier.

Republican primary results
Party	Candidate	Votes	%
Republican	Chris Pritt (incumbent)	752	100.0
Total votes		752	100.0

Democratic primary results
Party	Candidate	Votes	%
Democratic	Jim Barach (incumbent)	766	100.0
Total votes		766	100.0

==== General election ====
West Virginia's 53rd House of Delegates district, 2022
Party	Candidate	Votes	%
Republican	Chris Pritt (incumbent)	2,707	61.0
Democratic	Wayne Crozier	1,729	39.0
Total votes		4,436	100.0
Republican win (new boundaries)			

=== District 54 ===
Incumbent Mike Pushkin was first elected in 2014.

Republican primary results
Party	Candidate	Votes	%
Republican	John Luoni	381	66.8
Republican	Julien Aklei	189	33.2
Total votes		570	100.0

Democratic primary results
Party	Candidate	Votes	%
Democratic	Mike Pushkin (incumbent)	1,877	100.0
Total votes		1,877	100.0

==== General election ====
West Virginia's 54th House of Delegates district, 2022
Party	Candidate	Votes	%
Democratic	Mike Pushkin (incumbent)	3,342	73.6
Republican	John Luoni	1,198	26.4
Total votes		4,540	100.0
Democratic win (new boundaries)			

=== District 55 ===
Incumbent Moore Capito, son of United States senator Shelley Moore Capito, was first elected in 2016.

Republican primary results
Party	Candidate	Votes	%
Republican	Moore Capito (incumbent)	1,065	100.0
Total votes		1,065	100.0

Democratic primary results
Party	Candidate	Votes	%
Democratic	Greg Childress	1,006	100.0
Total votes		1,006	100.0

West Virginia's 55th House of Delegates district, 2022
Party	Candidate	Votes	%
Republican	Moore Capito (incumbent)	3,476	59.2
Democratic	Greg Childress	2,393	40.8
Total votes		5,869	100.0
Republican win (new boundaries)			

=== District 56 ===
Incumbents Kayla Young was first elected in 2020. In 2022, incumbent Larry Pack, running against Young in the general election, resigned from the House of Delegates. His successor, Andrew Anderson, replaced him as the Republican nominee for District 56.

Republican primary results
Party	Candidate	Votes	%
Republican	Larry Pack (incumbent)	834	68.5
Republican	Richard Boggess	384	31.5
Total votes		1,218	100.0

Democratic primary results
Party	Candidate	Votes	%
Democratic	Kayla Young (incumbent)	1,005	73.1
Democratic	Devin Casey	369	26.9
Total votes		1,374	100.0

==== General election ====
2022 results by precinct: Anderson: Anderson—50–60%; Anderson—60–70%; Anderson—70–80%; Young: Young—50–60%; Young—60–70%; Young—70–80%

West Virginia's 56th House of Delegates district, 2022
Party	Candidate	Votes	%
Democratic	Kayla Young (incumbent)	2,886	50.5
Republican	Andrew Anderson (incumbent)	2,828	49.5
Total votes		5,714	100.0
Democratic win (new boundaries)			

=== District 57 ===
Incumbent Doug Skaff was first elected in 2018.

Republican primary results
Party	Candidate	Votes	%
Republican	Ernest Blevins	641	100.0
Total votes		641	100.0

Democratic primary results
Party	Candidate	Votes	%
Democratic	Doug Skaff (incumbent)	1,058	100.0
Total votes		1,058	100.0

==== General election ====
West Virginia's 57th House of Delegates district, 2022
Party	Candidate	Votes	%
Democratic	Doug Skaff (incumbent)	3,044	61.1
Republican	Ernest Blevins	1,650	33.2
Mountain	E.C. Anderson	285	5.7
Total votes		4,979	100.0
Democratic win (new boundaries)			

=== District 58 ===
Republican primary results
Party	Candidate	Votes	%
Republican	Walter Hall	500	38.1
Republican	Samuel Parsons	421	32.1
Republican	Trevor Morris	318	24.2
Republican	Edward Burgess	73	5.6
Total votes		1,312	100.0

Democratic primary results
Party	Candidate	Votes	%
Democratic	Dakota Buckley	784	100.0
Total votes		784	100.0

==== General election ====
West Virginia's 58th House of Delegates district, 2022
Party	Candidate	Votes	%
Republican	Walter Hall	2,971	62.2
Democratic	Dakota Buckley	1,805	37.8
Total votes		4,776	100.0
Republican win (new boundaries)			

=== District 59 ===
Incumbent Dianna Graves was appointed in 2017. Graves lost the Republican primary to Andy Shamblin.

Republican primary results
Party	Candidate	Votes	%
Republican	Andy Shamblin	713	54.0
Republican	Dianna Graves (incumbent)	607	46.0
Total votes		1,320	100.0

Democratic primary results
Party	Candidate	Votes	%
Democratic	Rusty Williams	669	100.0
Total votes		669	100.0

==== General election ====
West Virginia's 59th House of Delegates district, 2022
Party	Candidate	Votes	%
Republican	Andy Shamblin	2,767	62.1
Democratic	Rusty Williams	1,691	37.9
Total votes		4,458	100.0
Republican win (new boundaries)			

=== District 60 ===
Incumbent Dana Ferrell was first elected in 2020.

Republican primary results
Party	Candidate	Votes	%
Republican	Dana Ferrell (incumbent)	875	100.0
Total votes		875	100.0

Democratic primary results
Party	Candidate	Votes	%
Democratic	David Holmes	538	100.0
Total votes		538	100.0

==== General election ====
West Virginia's 60th House of Delegates district, 2022
Party	Candidate	Votes	%
Republican	Dana Ferrell (incumbent)	3,154	69.0
Democratic	David Holmes	1,416	31.0
Total votes		4,570	100.0
Republican win (new boundaries)			

=== District 61 ===
Incumbent Dean Jeffries was first elected in 2018.

Republican primary results
Party	Candidate	Votes	%
Republican	Dean Jeffries (incumbent)	1,052	100.0
Total votes		1,052	100.0

==== General election ====
West Virginia's 61st House of Delegates district, 2022
Party	Candidate	Votes	%
Republican	Dean Jeffries (incumbent)	3,764	100.0
Total votes		3,764	100.0
Republican win (new boundaries)			

=== District 62 ===
Incumbent Roger Hanshaw was first elected in 2014.

Republican primary results
Party	Candidate	Votes	%
Republican	Roger Hanshaw (incumbent)	1,321	100.0
Total votes		1,321	100.0

==== General election ====
West Virginia's 62nd House of Delegates district, 2022
Party	Candidate	Votes	%
Republican	Roger Hanshaw (incumbent)	3,973	81.5
ACT	Laura McGinnis	899	18.5
Total votes		4,872	100.0
Republican win (new boundaries)			

=== District 63 ===
Republican primary results
Party	Candidate	Votes	%
Republican	Lori Dittman	619	78.9
Republican	Duane Williams	167	21.1
Total votes		786	100.0

Democratic primary results
Party	Candidate	Votes	%
Democratic	Kevin Carpenter	995	100.0
Total votes		995	100.0

==== General election ====
West Virginia's 63rd House of Delegates district, 2022
Party	Candidate	Votes	%
Republican	Lori Dittman	3,014	71.1
Democratic	Kevin Carpenter	1,227	28.9
Total votes		4,241	100.0
Republican win (new boundaries)			

=== District 64 ===
Incumbent Adam Burkhammer was first elected in 2020.

Republican primary results
Party	Candidate	Votes	%
Republican	Adam Burkhammer (incumbent)	1,778	100.0
Total votes		1,778	100.0

Democratic primary results
Party	Candidate	Votes	%
Democratic	John Clise	746	100.0
Total votes		746	100.0

==== General election ====
West Virginia's 64th House of Delegates district, 2022
Party	Candidate	Votes	%
Republican	Adam Burkhammer (incumbent)	3,583	77.0
Democratic	John Clise	1,073	23.0
Total votes		4,656	100.0
Republican win (new boundaries)			

=== District 65 ===
Incumbent Carl Martin was first elected in 2018.

Republican primary results
Party	Candidate	Votes	%
Republican	Carl Martin (incumbent)	1,745	100.0
Total votes		1,745	100.0

West Virginia's 65th House of Delegates district, 2022
Party	Candidate	Votes	%
Republican	Carl Martin (incumbent)	3,720	97.7
Write-in		86	2.3
Total votes		3,806	100.0
Republican win (new boundaries)			

=== District 66 ===
Incumbent Ty Nestor was first elected in 2020.

Republican primary results
Party	Candidate	Votes	%
Republican	Ty Nestor (incumbent)	1,120	100.0
Total votes		1,120	100.0

Democratic primary results
Party	Candidate	Votes	%
Democratic	Robert Sheets	1,072	100.0
Total votes		1,072	100.0

==== General election ====
West Virginia's 66th House of Delegates district, 2022
Party	Candidate	Votes	%
Republican	Ty Nestor (incumbent)	3,102	66.1
Democratic	Robert Sheets	1,590	33.9
Total votes		4,692	100.0
Republican win (new boundaries)			

=== District 67 ===
Incumbent Cody Thompson was first elected in 2018.

Republican primary results
Party	Candidate	Votes	%
Republican	Elias Coop-Gonzalez	1,098	100.0
Total votes		1,098	100.0

Democratic primary results
Party	Candidate	Votes	%
Democratic	Cody Thompson (incumbent)	1,185	100.0
Total votes		1,185	100.0

==== General election ====
West Virginia's 67th House of Delegates district, 2022
Party	Candidate	Votes	%
Republican	Elias Coop-Gonzalez	3,496	60.3
Democratic	Cody Thompson (incumbent)	2,302	39.7
Total votes		5,798	100.0
Republican win (new boundaries)			

=== District 68 ===
Incumbent Chris Phillips was first elected in 2018.

Republican primary results
Party	Candidate	Votes	%
Republican	Chris Phillips (incumbent)	1,805	100.0
Total votes		1,805	100.0

==== General election ====
West Virginia's 68th House of Delegates district, 2022
Party	Candidate	Votes	%
Republican	Chris Phillips (incumbent)	4,178	100.0
Total votes		4,178	100.0
Republican win (new boundaries)			

=== District 69 ===
Incumbent Danny Hamrick was first elected in 2012. Harmick lost the Republican primary to Keith Marple.

Republican primary results
Party	Candidate	Votes	%
Republican	Keith Marple	887	53.7
Republican	Danny Hamrick (incumbent)	764	46.3
Total votes		1,651	100.0

Democratic primary results
Party	Candidate	Votes	%
Democratic	Ron Watson	824	100.0
Total votes		824	100.0

==== General election ====
West Virginia's 69th House of Delegates district, 2022
Party	Candidate	Votes	%
Republican	Keith Marple	3,779	67.3
Democratic	Ron Watson	1,834	32.7
Total votes		5,613	100.0
Republican win (new boundaries)			

=== District 70 ===
Republican primary results
Party	Candidate	Votes	%
Republican	Mickey Petitto	330	39.8
Republican	Paul Howe	236	28.5
Republican	Bryan Payne	139	16.7
Republican	Tyler Hart	124	15.0
Total votes		829	100.0

Democratic primary results
Party	Candidate	Votes	%
Democratic	Ryan Deems	525	50.5
Democratic	Ron Fragale	514	49.5
Total votes		1,039	100.0

==== General election ====
West Virginia's 70th House of Delegates district, 2022
Party	Candidate	Votes	%
Republican	Mickey Petitto	2,108	53.8
Democratic	Ryan Deems	1,808	46.2
Total votes		3,916	100.0
Republican win (new boundaries)			

=== District 71 ===
Incumbent Laura Kimble was first elected in 2020.

Republican primary results
Party	Candidate	Votes	%
Republican	Laura Kimble (incumbent)	1,071	63.7
Republican	Ben Hanlan	610	36.3
Total votes		1,681	100.0

Democratic primary results
Party	Candidate	Votes	%
Democratic	Robert Garcia	883	74.6
Democratic	Justin Lung	301	25.4
Total votes		1,184	100.0

==== General election ====
West Virginia's 71st House of Delegates district, 2022
Party	Candidate	Votes	%
Republican	Laura Kimble (incumbent)	3,314	58.1
Democratic	Robert Garcia	2,386	41.9
Total votes		5,700	100.0
Republican win (new boundaries)			

=== District 72 ===
Incumbent Clay Riley was first elected in 2020.

Republican primary results
Party	Candidate	Votes	%
Republican	Clay Riley (incumbent)	916	100.0
Total votes		916	100.0

Democratic primary results
Party	Candidate	Votes	%
Democratic	Derek McIntyre	705	100.0
Total votes		705	100.0

==== General election ====
West Virginia's 72nd House of Delegates district, 2022
Party	Candidate	Votes	%
Republican	Clay Riley (incumbent)	3,062	71.3
Democratic	Derek McIntyre	1,230	28.7
Total votes		4,292	100.0
Republican win (new boundaries)			

=== District 73 ===
Incumbent Amy Summers was first elected in 2014.

Republican primary results
Party	Candidate	Votes	%
Republican	Amy Summers (incumbent)	1,599	100.0
Total votes		1,599	100.0

Democratic primary results
Party	Candidate	Votes	%
Democratic	Mike Manypenny	765	100.0
Total votes		765	100.0

==== General election ====
West Virginia's 73rd House of Delegates district, 2022
Party	Candidate	Votes	%
Republican	Amy Summers (incumbent)	3,347	69.3
Democratic	Mike Manypenny	1,479	30.7
Total votes		4,826	100.0
Republican win (new boundaries)			

=== District 74 ===
Incumbent Guy Ward was first elected in 2020. Ward lost the Republican primary to Mike DeVault.

Republican primary results
Party	Candidate	Votes	%
Republican	Mike DeVault	898	54.6
Republican	Guy Ward (incumbent)	748	45.4
Total votes		1,646	100.0

Democratic primary results
Party	Candidate	Votes	%
Democratic	John Palmer	1,253	100.0
Total votes		1,253	100.0

==== General election ====
West Virginia's 74th House of Delegates district, 2022
Party	Candidate	Votes	%
Republican	Mike DeVault	3,752	66.5
Democratic	John Palmer	1,886	33.5
Total votes		5,638	100.0
Republican win (new boundaries)			

=== District 75 ===
Incumbent Phil Mallow was first elected in 2020.

Republican primary results
Party	Candidate	Votes	%
Republican	Phil Mallow (incumbent)	1,228	100.0
Total votes		1,228	100.0

Democratic primary results
Party	Candidate	Votes	%
Democratic	Stephanie Tomana	1,459	100.0
Total votes		1,459	100.0

==== General election ====
West Virginia's 75th House of Delegates district, 2022
Party	Candidate	Votes	%
Republican	Phil Mallow (incumbent)	2,923	54.5
Democratic	Stephanie Tomana	2,438	45.5
Total votes		5,361	100.0
Republican win (new boundaries)			

=== District 76 ===
Incumbent Joey Garcia was first elected in 2020.

Republican primary results
Party	Candidate	Votes	%
Republican	Jon Dodds	513	50.2
Republican	Toby Heaney	508	49.8
Total votes		1,021	100.0

Democratic primary results
Party	Candidate	Votes	%
Democratic	Joey Garcia (incumbent)	1,363	100.0
Total votes		1,363	100.0

==== General election ====
West Virginia's 76th House of Delegates district, 2022
Party	Candidate	Votes	%
Democratic	Joey Garcia (incumbent)	2,485	54.6
Republican	Jon Dodds	2,068	45.4
Total votes		4,553	100.0
Democratic win (new boundaries)			

=== District 77 ===
Incumbent Joe Statler was first elected in 2020.

Republican primary results
Party	Candidate	Votes	%
Republican	Joe Statler (incumbent)	1,051	100.0
Total votes		1,051	100.0

Democratic primary results
Party	Candidate	Votes	%
Democratic	Ben Swanson	695	100.0
Total votes		695	100.0

==== General election ====
West Virginia's 77th House of Delegates district, 2022
Party	Candidate	Votes	%
Republican	Joe Statler (incumbent)	3,557	68.1
Democratic	Ben Swanson	1,664	31.9
Total votes		5,221	100.0
Republican win (new boundaries)			

=== District 78 ===
Republican primary results
Party	Candidate	Votes	%
Republican	Geno Chiarelli	444	36.8
Republican	Toni DiChiacchio	384	31.8
Republican	Scott Nale	379	31.4
Total votes		1,207	100.0

Democratic primary results
Party	Candidate	Votes	%
Democratic	Jeffrey Budkey	721	100.0
Total votes		721	100.0

==== General election ====
West Virginia's 78th House of Delegates district, 2022
Party	Candidate	Votes	%
Republican	Geno Chiarelli	3,056	56.6
Democratic	Jeffrey Budkey	2,341	43.4
Total votes		5,397	100.0
Republican win (new boundaries)			

=== District 79 ===
Incumbent Evan Hansen was first elected in 2018.

Republican primary results
Party	Candidate	Votes	%
Republican	Zach LeMaire	353	100.0
Total votes		353	100.0

Democratic primary results
Party	Candidate	Votes	%
Democratic	Evan Hansen (incumbent)	1,114	92.3
Democratic	Matthew Kolb	93	7.7
Total votes		1,207	100.0

==== General election ====
West Virginia's 79th House of Delegates district, 2022
Party	Candidate	Votes	%
Democratic	Evan Hansen (incumbent)	2,790	74.7
Republican	Zach LeMaire	947	25.3
Total votes		3,737	100.0
Democratic win (new boundaries)			

=== District 80 ===
Incumbent John Williams was first elected in 2016.

Republican primary results
Party	Candidate	Votes	%
Republican	Justin White	540	100.0
Total votes		540	100.0

Democratic primary results
Party	Candidate	Votes	%
Democratic	John Williams (incumbent)	900	100.0
Total votes		900	100.0

==== General election ====
West Virginia's 80th House of Delegates district, 2022
Party	Candidate	Votes	%
Democratic	John Williams (incumbent)	2,427	62.5
Republican	Justin White	1,458	37.5
Total votes		3,885	100.0
Democratic win (new boundaries)			

=== District 81 ===
Incumbent Danielle Walker was first elected in 2018.

Republican primary results
Party	Candidate	Votes	%
Republican	Steven Harris	281	100.0
Total votes		281	100.0

Democratic primary results
Party	Candidate	Votes	%
Democratic	Danielle Walker (incumbent)	491	100.0
Total votes		491	100.0

==== General election ====
West Virginia's 81st House of Delegates district, 2022
Party	Candidate	Votes	%
Democratic	Danielle Walker (incumbent)	1,633	62.9
Republican	Steven Harris	963	37.1
Total votes		2,596	100.0
Democratic win (new boundaries)			

=== District 82 ===
Republican primary results
Party	Candidate	Votes	%
Republican	Debbie Warner	559	53.8
Republican	Cindy Frich	356	34.4
Republican	Drew Talbott	123	11.8
Total votes		1,038	100.0

Democratic primary results
Party	Candidate	Votes	%
Democratic	Katie Fallon	710	100.0
Total votes		710	100.0

==== General election ====
West Virginia's 82nd House of Delegates district, 2022
Party	Candidate	Votes	%
Republican	Debbie Warner	2,822	51.3
Democratic	Katie Fallon	2,683	48.7
Total votes		5,505	100.0
Republican win (new boundaries)			

=== District 83 ===
Republican primary results
Party	Candidate	Votes	%
Republican	George Street	1,529	100.0
Total votes		1,529	100.0

Democratic primary results
Party	Candidate	Votes	%
Democratic	J.R. Wolfe	481	100.0
Total votes		481	100.0

==== General election ====
West Virginia's 83rd House of Delegates district, 2022
Party	Candidate	Votes	%
Republican	George Street	2,943	70.7
Democratic	J.R. Wolfe	1,217	29.2
Total votes		4,160	100.0
Republican win (new boundaries)			

=== District 84 ===
Incumbent D. Rolland Jennings was appointed in 2017.

Republican primary results
Party	Candidate	Votes	%
Republican	D. Rolland Jennings (incumbent)	1,867	71.8
Republican	Brian Harris	733	28.2
Total votes		2,600	100.0

Democratic primary results
Party	Candidate	Votes	%
Democratic	Lisa Hyre	759	100.0
Total votes		759	100.0

==== General election ====
West Virginia's 84th House of Delegates district, 2022
Party	Candidate	Votes	%
Republican	D. Rolland Jennings (incumbent)	3,531	72.0
Democratic	Lisa Hyre	1,372	28.0
Total votes		4,903	100.0
Republican win (new boundaries)			

=== District 85 ===
Incumbent John Paul Hott was first elected in 2018.

Republican primary results
Party	Candidate	Votes	%
Republican	John Paul Hott (incumbent)	2,469	100.0
Total votes		2,469	100.0

==== General election ====
West Virginia's 85th House of Delegates district, 2022
Party	Candidate	Votes	%
Republican	John Paul Hott (incumbent)	5,064	100.0
Total votes		5,064	100.0
Republican win (new boundaries)			

=== District 86 ===
Incumbent Bryan Ward was first elected in 2020.

Republican primary results
Party	Candidate	Votes	%
Republican	Bryan Ward (incumbent)	975	100.0
Total votes		975	100.0

Democratic primary results
Party	Candidate	Votes	%
Democratic	Jameson Freeman	333	51.1
Democratic	Bradley Rinard	319	48.9
Total votes		640	100.0

==== General election ====
West Virginia's 86th House of Delegates district, 2022
Party	Candidate	Votes	%
Republican	Bryan Ward (incumbent)	3,796	77.4
Democratic	Jameson Freeman	1,108	22.6
Total votes		4,904	100.0
Republican win (new boundaries)			

=== District 87 ===
Incumbent Gary Howell was first elected in 2010.

Republican primary results
Party	Candidate	Votes	%
Republican	Gary Howell (incumbent)	1,390	100.0
Total votes		1,390	100.0

Democratic primary results
Party	Candidate	Votes	%
Democratic	David Boden	481	100.0
Total votes		481	100.0

==== General election ====
West Virginia's 87th House of Delegates district, 2022
Party	Candidate	Votes	%
Republican	Gary Howell (incumbent)	3,453	69.6
Democratic	David Boden	1,509	30.4
Total votes		4,962	100.0
Republican win (new boundaries)			

=== District 88 ===
Republican primary results
Party	Candidate	Votes	%
Republican	Rick Hillenbrand	803	40.1
Republican	Keith Funkhouser	799	39.8
Republican	Stephen Smoot	252	12.6
Republican	Austin Iman	151	7.5
Total votes		2,005	100.0

==== General election ====
West Virginia's 88th House of Delegates district, 2022
Party	Candidate	Votes	%
Republican	Rick Hillenbrand	4,534	100.0
Total votes		4,534	100.0
Republican win (new boundaries)			

=== District 89 ===
Incumbent Ruth Rowan was first elected in 2004. Rowan's son-in-law, Robert Wolford, filed to run as an independent following her loss to Darren Thorne in the Republican primary.

Republican primary results
Party	Candidate	Votes	%
Republican	Darren Thorne	991	51.0
Republican	Ruth Rowan (incumbent)	954	49.0
Total votes		1,945	100.0

==== General election ====
West Virginia's 89th House of Delegates district, 2022
Party	Candidate	Votes	%
Republican	Darren Thorne	3,789	75.2
Independent	Robert Wolford	1,253	24.8
Total votes		5,042	100.0
Republican win (new boundaries)			

=== District 90 ===
Incumbents George Miller and Ken Reed were first elected in 2020. Miller defeated Reed in the Republican primary caused by redistricting.

Republican primary results
Party	Candidate	Votes	%
Republican	George Miller (incumbent)	1,312	57.3
Republican	Ken Reed (incumbent)	976	42.7
Total votes		2,288	100.0

==== General election ====
West Virginia's 90th House of Delegates district, 2022
Party	Candidate	Votes	%
Republican	George Miller (incumbent)	5,046	100.0
Total votes		5,046	100.0
Republican win (new boundaries)			

=== District 91 ===
Incumbent Don Forsht was first elected in 2020.

Republican primary results
Party	Candidate	Votes	%
Republican	Don Forsht (incumbent)	1,008	100.0
Total votes		1,008	100.0

==== General election ====
West Virginia's 91st House of Delegates district, 2022
Party	Candidate	Votes	%
Republican	Don Forsht (incumbent)	2,531	60.2
ACT	S. Marshall Wilson	1,666	39.7
Write-in		5	0.1
Total votes		4,202	100.0
Republican win (new boundaries)			

=== District 92 ===
Republican primary results
Party	Candidate	Votes	%
Republican	Michael Hite	1,313	100.0
Total votes		1,313	100.0

==== General election ====
West Virginia's 92nd House of Delegates district, 2022
Party	Candidate	Votes	%
Republican	Michael Hite	4,075	100.0
Total votes		4,075	100.0
Republican win (new boundaries)			

=== District 93 ===
Republican primary results
Party	Candidate	Votes	%
Republican	Michael Hornby	893	100.0
Total votes		893	100.0

Democratic primary results
Party	Candidate	Votes	%
Democratic	Z. Lansdowne	499	100.0
Total votes		499	100.0

==== General election ====
West Virginia's 93rd House of Delegates district, 2022
Party	Candidate	Votes	%
Republican	Michael Hornby	2,347	63.4
Democratic	Z. Lansdowne	1,356	36.6
Total votes		3,703	100.0
Republican win (new boundaries)			

=== District 94 ===
Republican primary results
Party	Candidate	Votes	%
Republican	Larry Kump	671	66.8
Republican	Ryan Hammond	175	17.4
Republican	Janet McNulty	158	15.7
Total votes		1,008	100.0

==== General election ====
West Virginia's 94th House of Delegates district, 2022
Party	Candidate	Votes	%
Republican	Larry Kump	3,123	100.0
Total votes		3,123	100.0
Republican win (new boundaries)			

=== District 95 ===
Incumbent Chuck Horst was first elected in 2020.

Republican primary results
Party	Candidate	Votes	%
Republican	Chuck Horst (incumbent)	870	100.0
Total votes		870	100.0

Democratic primary results
Party	Candidate	Votes	%
Democratic	Debi Carroll	325	100.0
Total votes		325	100.0

==== General election ====
West Virginia's 95th House of Delegates district, 2022
Party	Candidate	Votes	%
Republican	Chuck Horst (incumbent)	2,689	69.8
Democratic	Debi Carroll	1,161	30.2
Total votes		3,850	100.0
Republican win (new boundaries)			

=== District 96 ===
Incumbent Eric Householder was first elected in 2010.

Republican primary results
Party	Candidate	Votes	%
Republican	Eric Householder (incumbent)	859	100.0
Total votes		859	100.0

Democratic primary results
Party	Candidate	Votes	%
Democratic	Ronald Wenger	328	100.0
Total votes		328	100.0

==== General election ====
West Virginia's 96th House of Delegates district, 2022
Party	Candidate	Votes	%
Republican	Eric Householder (incumbent)	2,766	70.9
Democratic	Ronald Wenger	1,137	29.1
Total votes		3,903	100.0
Republican win (new boundaries)			

=== District 97 ===
Incumbent John Hardy was first elected in 2018.

Republican primary results
Party	Candidate	Votes	%
Republican	John Hardy (incumbent)	924	74.8
Republican	Alonzo Perry	312	25.2
Total votes		1,236	100.0

Democratic primary results
Party	Candidate	Votes	%
Democratic	Phillip Wenner	697	100.0
Total votes		697	100.0

==== General election ====
West Virginia's 97th House of Delegates district, 2022
Party	Candidate	Votes	%
Republican	John Hardy (incumbent)	2,973	58.1
Democratic	Phillip Wenner	2,145	41.9
Total votes		5,118	100.0
Republican win (new boundaries)			

=== District 98 ===
Incumbent Paul Espinosa was first elected in 2012.

Republican primary results
Party	Candidate	Votes	%
Republican	Paul Espinosa (incumbent)	985	100.0
Total votes		985	100.0

==== General election ====
West Virginia's 98th House of Delegates district, 2022
Party	Candidate	Votes	%
Republican	Paul Espinosa (incumbent)	3,681	100.0
Total votes		3,681	100.0
Republican win (new boundaries)			

=== District 99 ===
Incumbent Wayne Clark was first elected in 2020.

Republican primary results
Party	Candidate	Votes	%
Republican	Wayne Clark (incumbent)	1,017	100.0
Total votes		1,017	100.0

Democratic primary results
Party	Candidate	Votes	%
Democratic	Debra Cornwell	619	100.0
Total votes		619	100.0

==== General election ====
West Virginia's 99th House of Delegates district, 2022
Party	Candidate	Votes	%
Republican	Wayne Clark (incumbent)	2,958	56.6
Democratic	Debra Cornwell	2,265	43.4
Total votes		5,223	100.0
Republican win (new boundaries)			

=== District 100 ===
Republican primary results
Party	Candidate	Votes	%
Republican	William Ridenour	606	36.2
Republican	Pasha Majdi	539	32.2
Republican	Steve Harris	527	31.5
Total votes		1,672	100.0

Democratic primary results
Party	Candidate	Votes	%
Democratic	Susan Benzinger	802	100.0
Total votes		802	100.0

==== General election ====
West Virginia's 100th House of Delegates district, 2022
Party	Candidate	Votes	%
Republican	William Ridenour	3,390	54.8
Democratic	Susan Benzinger	2,801	45.2
Total votes		6,191	100.0
Republican win (new boundaries)			
