= 2020 West Virginia House of Delegates election =

2020 West Virginia House of Delegates elections
- November 3, 2020

All 100 seats in the West Virginia House of Delegates 51 seats needed for a majority
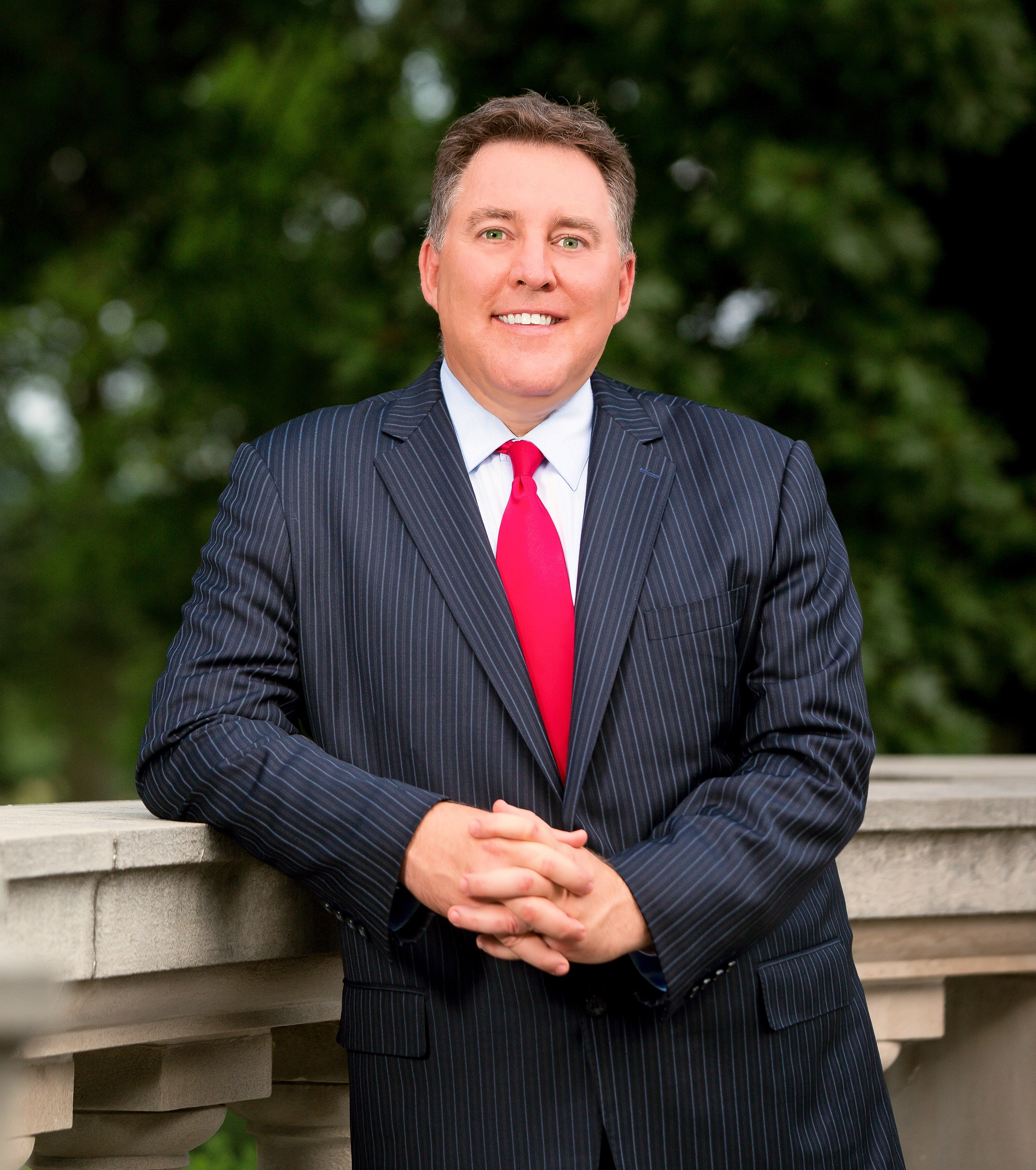
	Majority party	Minority party
	GOP
Leader	Roger Hanshaw	Tim Miley
Party	Republican	Democratic
Leader since	August 29, 2018	January 7, 2015
Leader's seat	33rd district	48th district
Last election	59 seats, 50.2%	41 seats, 48.3%
Seats before	58	41
Seats won	76	24
Seat change	▲18	▼17
Popular vote	757,431	521,121
Percentage	58.8%	40.5%
Swing	▲8.6%	▼7.8%
	Third party
Party	Independent
Last election	0 seats, 1.6%
Seats before	1
Seats won	0
Seat change	▼1
Popular vote	1,656
Percentage	0.1%
Swing	▼1.5%
- Seat colors (boxes): Republican gain Democratic hold Republican hold District colors: Majority of members Democratic Majority of members Republican; Split
Speaker before election
Roger Hanshaw
Republican
Elected Speaker
Roger Hanshaw
Republican

Elections to the West Virginia House of Delegates took place on November 3, 2020. All the seats in the West Virginia House of Delegates were up for election.

== Overview ==
The Republican Party, cementing their hold over West Virginia state politics, made a gain of 18 seats in the House of Delegates, holding over three-fourths of the chamber's seats and achieving supermajority status. The scope of the Republicans' gains, which swept many traditionally Democratic areas, was unexpected on both sides of the aisle, with both Democrats and Republicans expressing surprise at the results. The election, further eroding the Democrats' caucus in the House, is a part of a decades-long shift in power statewide from Democrats to Republicans.

↓
76	24
Republican	Democratic

2020 West Virginia House of Delegates election
Party	Races contested	Votes	Percentage	% change	Seats before	Seats after	+/–
Republican	66	757,431	58.84%	▲8.6%	58	76	▲18
Democratic	56	521,121	40.48%	▼7.8%	41	24	▼17
Libertarian	4	3,889	0.30%	▼0.3%	0	0	Steady
Mountain	3	3,236	0.25%	▼0.1%	0	0	Steady
Independent	1	1,656	0.13%	▼1.5%	1	0	▼1
Totals	67	1,287,333	100.00%	—	100	100	—
Ballots cast/turnout		802,726	63.25%	▲15.3%			

== Predictions ==
Source	Ranking	As of
The Cook Political Report	Safe R	October 21, 2020

== Speaker election ==
On January 13, 2021, the first regular session of the 85th West Virginia Legislature convened, and the election of the speaker took place. 98 delegates voted, while two were not counted as present in the roll call. From the majority caucus, incumbent speaker Roger Hanshaw was nominated by Kayla Kessinger, and seconded by Jeffrey Pack. Doug Skaff, the new Democratic leader, was nominated by Brent Boggs, and was seconded by Lisa Zukoff. On a vote along party lines, Hanshaw was elected with the support of 76 delegates, including then-Democrat Mick Bates, while Skaff received 22 votes.

Speakership election
Party	Candidate	Votes	%
Republican	Roger Hanshaw (incumbent)	76	77.6
Democratic	Doug Skaff	22	22.4
Total votes		98	100.0
Republican hold			

Speakership election by member
District	Member	Vote
District 8	Bill Anderson	Roger Hanshaw
District 36	Jim Barach	Doug Skaff
District 7	Trenton Barnhart	Roger Hanshaw
District 61	Jason Barrett	Roger Hanshaw
District 30	Mick Bates	Roger Hanshaw
District 34	Brent Boggs	Doug Skaff
District 24	Jordan Bridges	Roger Hanshaw
District 20	Nathan Brown	Doug Skaff
District 42	Barry Bruce	Roger Hanshaw
District 46	Adam Burkhammer	Roger Hanshaw
District 35	Moore Capito	Roger Hanshaw
District 65	Wayne Clark	Roger Hanshaw
District 10	Roger Conley	Roger Hanshaw
District 28	Roy Cooper	Roger Hanshaw
District 10	Vernon Criss	Roger Hanshaw
District 21	Mark Dean	Roger Hanshaw
District 2	Phillip Diserio	Doug Skaff
District 67	John Doyle	Doug Skaff
District 27	Joe Ellington	Roger Hanshaw
District 66	Paul Espinosa	Roger Hanshaw
District 26	Ed Evans	Doug Skaff
District 32	Tom Fast	Roger Hanshaw
District 39	Dana Ferrell	Roger Hanshaw
District 51	Barbara Fleischauer	Doug Skaff
District 3	Shawn Fluharty	Doug Skaff
District 60	Don Forsht	Roger Hanshaw
District 50	Joey Garcia	Doug Skaff
District 27	Marty Gearheart	Roger Hanshaw
District 38	Dianna Graves	Roger Hanshaw
District 19	Ric Griffith	Doug Skaff
District 48	Danny Hamrick	Roger Hanshaw
District 44	Caleb Hanna	Roger Hanshaw
District 51	Evan Hansen	Doug Skaff
District 33	Roger Hanshaw	Doug Skaff
District 63	John Hardy	Roger Hanshaw
District 32	Austin Haynes	Roger Hanshaw
District 13	Joshua Higginbotham	Roger Hanshaw
District 23	Josh Holstein	Roger Hanshaw
District 16	Sean Hornbuckle	Doug Skaff
District 62	Chuck Horst	Roger Hanshaw
District 54	John Paul Hott	Roger Hanshaw
District 64	Eric Householder	Roger Hanshaw
District 56	Gary Howell	Roger Hanshaw
District 40	Dean Jeffries	Roger Hanshaw
District 22	Joe Jeffries	Roger Hanshaw
District 53	Rolland Jennings	Roger Hanshaw
District 11	Riley Keaton	Roger Hanshaw
District 6	David Kelly	Roger Hanshaw
District 10	John Kelly	Roger Hanshaw
District 32	Kayla Kessinger	Roger Hanshaw
District 48	Laura Kimble	Roger Hanshaw
District 9	Shannon Kimes	Roger Hanshaw
District 16	Daniel Linville	Roger Hanshaw
District 42	Todd Longanacre	Roger Hanshaw
District 17	Chad Lovejoy	Doug Skaff
District 50	Phil Mallow	Roger Hanshaw
District 16	John Mandt	Roger Hanshaw
District 45	Carl Martin	Roger Hanshaw
District 22	Zack Maynard	Roger Hanshaw
District 24	Margitta Mazzocchi	Roger Hanshaw
District 1	Pat McGeehan	Roger Hanshaw
District 58	George Miller	Roger Hanshaw
District 43	Ty Nestor	Roger Hanshaw
District 28	Jeffrey Pack	Roger Hanshaw
District 35	Larry Pack	Roger Hanshaw
District 25	Tony Paynter	Roger Hanshaw
District 5	Dave Pethtel	Doug Skaff
District 47	Chris Phillips	Roger Hanshaw
District 13	Jonathan Pinson	Roger Hanshaw
District 36	Chris Pritt	Roger Hanshaw
District 37	Mike Pushkin	Doug Skaff
District 48	Ben Queen	Roger Hanshaw
District 59	Ken Reed	Roger Hanshaw
District 4	Charlie Reynolds	Roger Hanshaw
District 48	Clay Riley	Roger Hanshaw
District 17	Matthew Rohrbach	Roger Hanshaw
District 57	Ruth Rowan	Roger Hanshaw
District 36	Larry Rowe	Doug Skaff
District 35	Doug Skaff	Roger Hanshaw
District 27	Doug Smith	Roger Hanshaw
District 51	Joe Statler	Roger Hanshaw
District 29	Brandon Steele	Roger Hanshaw
District 3	Erikka Storch	Roger Hanshaw
District 49	Amy Summers	Roger Hanshaw
District 52	Terri Sypolt	Roger Hanshaw
District 43	Cody Thompson	Doug Skaff
District 31	Chris Toney	Roger Hanshaw
District 41	Heather Tully	Roger Hanshaw
District 51	Danielle Walker	Doug Skaff
District 14	Johnnie Wamsley	Roger Hanshaw
District 56	Bryan Ward	Roger Hanshaw
District 50	Guy Ward	Roger Hanshaw
District 12	Steve Westfall	Roger Hanshaw
District 51	John Williams	Doug Skaff
District 18	Evan Worrell	Roger Hanshaw
District 36	Kayla Young	Doug Skaff
District 1	Mark Zatezalo	Roger Hanshaw
District 4	Lisa Zukoff	Doug Skaff

== Results ==
=== District 1 ===
West Virginia's 1st House district general election, 2020 Elect two
Party	Candidate	Votes	%
Republican	Mark Zatezalo	8,978	35.25
Republican	Pat McGeehan (incumbent)	8,165	32.06
Democratic	Jack Wood	4,307	16.91
Democratic	Ronnie Jones	4,016	15.77
Total votes		25,466	100.0
Republican gain from Democratic			
Republican hold			

=== District 2 ===
West Virginia's 2nd House district general election, 2020
Party	Candidate	Votes	%
Democratic	Phil Diserio (incumbent)	4,146	55.71
Republican	Gordon Greer	3,296	44.29
Total votes		7,442	100.0
Democratic hold			

=== District 3 ===
West Virginia's 3rd House district general election, 2020 Elect two
Party	Candidate	Votes	%
Republican	Erikka Lynn Storch (incumbent)	11,451	38.60
Democratic	Shawn Fluharty (incumbent)	8,933	30.11
Republican	Dalton Haas	5,733	19.32
Democratic	Ben Schneider	3,551	11.97
Total votes		29,668	100.0
Republican hold			
Democratic hold			

=== District 4 ===
West Virginia's 4th House district general election, 2020 Elect two
Party	Candidate	Votes	%
Republican	Charlie Reynolds	8,085	35.69
Democratic	Lisa Zukoff (incumbent)	7,650	33.77
Democratic	Christian Turak	6,921	30.55
Total votes		22,656	100.0
Republican gain from Democratic			
Democratic hold			

=== District 5 ===
West Virginia's 5th House district general election, 2020
Party	Candidate	Votes	%
Democratic	Dave Pethtel (incumbent)	3,710	53.59
Republican	Phillip Wiley	3,213	46.41
Total votes		6,923	100.0
Democratic hold			

=== District 6 ===
West Virginia's 6th House district general election, 2020
Party	Candidate	Votes	%
Republican	David Kelly (incumbent)	5,034	72.70
Democratic	Cindy Welch	1,890	27.30
Total votes		6,924	100.0%
Republican hold			

=== District 7 ===
West Virginia's 7th House district general election, 2020
Party	Candidate	Votes	%
Republican	Trenton Barnhart (incumbent)	6,549	100.0%
Total votes		6,549	100.0%
Republican hold			

=== District 8 ===
West Virginia's 8th House district general election, 2020
Party	Candidate	Votes	%
Republican	Bill Anderson (incumbent)	6,270	72.28
Democratic	Andrew Alvarez	2,405	27.72
Total votes		8,675	100.0%
Republican hold			

=== District 9 ===
West Virginia's 9th House district general election, 2020
Party	Candidate	Votes	%
Republican	Shannon Kimes	5,733	70.31
Democratic	Jim Marion	2,421	29.69
Total votes		8,154	100.0%
Republican hold			

=== District 10 ===
West Virginia's 10th House district general election, 2020 Elect three
Party	Candidate	Votes	%
Republican	John R. Kelly (incumbent)	13,694	27.21
Republican	Roger Conley	11,198	22.25
Republican	Vernon Criss (incumbent)	11,003	21.87
Democratic	Trish Pritchard	8,651	17.19
Democratic	Luke Winters	5,775	11.48
Total votes		50,321	100.0%
Republican hold			
Republican hold			
Republican hold			

=== District 11 ===
West Virginia's 11th House district general election, 2020
Party	Candidate	Votes	%
Republican	Riley Keaton	4,797	66.46
Democratic	Mark Pauley	2,421	33.54
Total votes		7,218	100.0%
Republican hold			

=== District 12 ===
West Virginia's 12th House district general election, 2020
Party	Candidate	Votes	%
Republican	Steve Westfall (incumbent)	6,959	100.0
Total votes		6,959	100.0%
Republican hold			

=== District 13 ===
West Virginia's 13th House district general election, 2020 Elect two
Party	Candidate	Votes	%
Republican	Jonathan Pinson	8,833	36.04
Republican	Joshua Higginbotham (incumbent)	6,607	26.96
Democratic	Scott Brewer	6,012	24.53
Democratic	David Caldwell	3,057	12.47
Total votes		24,509	100.0%
Republican hold			
Republican hold			

=== District 14 ===
West Virginia's 14th House district general election, 2020
Party	Candidate	Votes	%
Republican	Johnnie Wamsley	5,078	69.37
Democratic	Chris Yeager	2,242	30.63
Total votes		7,320	100.0%
Republican hold			

=== District 15 ===
West Virginia's 15th House district general election, 2020
Party	Candidate	Votes	%
Republican	Geoff Foster (incumbent)	6,259	62.45
Democratic	Tess Jackson	3,177	31.70
Libertarian	Michael Young	586	5.85
Total votes		10,022	100.0%
Republican hold			

=== District 16 ===
West Virginia's 16th House district general election, 2020 Elect three
Party	Candidate	Votes	%
Democratic	Sean Hornbuckle (incumbent)	8,929	20.98
Republican	Daniel Linville (incumbent)	7,418	17.43
Republican	John Mandt Jr.	7,359	17.29
Republican	Mark Bates	7,288	17.12
Democratic	Anna Lewis	5,898	13.86
Democratic	Dakota Nelson	5,677	13.34
Write-in		23	0.00
Total votes		42,592	100.0%
Democratic hold			
Republican hold			
Republican hold			

=== District 17 ===
West Virginia's 17th House district general election, 2020 Elect two
Party	Candidate	Votes	%
Republican	Matthew Rohrbach (incumbent)	7,471	39.49
Democratic	Chad Lovejoy (incumbent)	6,167	32.59
Democratic	Jeanette Rowsey	5,283	27.92
Total votes		18,921	100.0%
Democratic hold			
Republican hold			

=== District 18 ===
West Virginia's 18th House district general election, 2020
Party	Candidate	Votes	%
Republican	Evan Worrell (incumbent)	5,531	69.76
Democratic	Paul Ross	2,398	30.24
Total votes		7,929	100.0%
Republican hold			

=== District 19 ===
West Virginia's 19th House district general election, 2020 Elect two
Party	Candidate	Votes	%
Republican	Derrick Evans	8,227	37.30
Democratic	Ric Griffith	5,520	25.03
Republican	Jason Stephens	4,192	19.01
Democratic	David Thompson	4,115	18.66
Total votes		22,054	100.0%
Democratic hold			
Republican gain from Democratic			

=== District 20 ===
West Virginia's 20th House district general election, 2020
Party	Candidate	Votes	%
Democratic	Nathan Brown (incumbent)	3,486	55.53
Republican	Matthew Deskins	2,792	44.47
Total votes		6,278	100.0%
Democratic hold			

=== District 21 ===
West Virginia's 21st House district general election, 2020
Party	Candidate	Votes	%
Republican	Mark Dean (incumbent)	4,298	69.56
Democratic	Phyllis White	1,881	30.44
Total votes		6,179	100.0%
Republican hold			

=== District 22 ===
West Virginia's 22nd House district general election, 2020 Elect two
Party	Candidate	Votes	%
Republican	Zack Maynard (incumbent)	7,068	35.02
Republican	Joe Jeffries (incumbent)	6,206	30.75
Democratic	Jeff Eldridge	5,003	24.79
Democratic	Cecil Silva	1,903	9.43
Total votes		20,180	100.0%
Republican hold			
Republican hold			

=== District 23 ===
West Virginia's 23rd House district general election, 2020
Party	Candidate	Votes	%
Republican	Josh Holstein	3,557	54.32
Democratic	Rodney Miller (incumbent)	2,991	45.68
Total votes		6,548	100.0%
Republican gain from Democratic			

=== District 24 ===
West Virginia's 24th House district general election, 2020 Elect two
Party	Candidate	Votes	%
Republican	Jordan Bridges	5,112	29.24
Republican	Margitta Mazzocchi	4,986	28.52
Democratic	Tim Tomblin (incumbent)	4,564	26.11
Democratic	Susan Perry	2,820	16.13
Write-in		1	0.00
Total votes		17,483	100.0%
Republican gain from Democratic			
Republican gain from Democratic			

=== District 25 ===
West Virginia's 25th House district general election, 2020
Party	Candidate	Votes	%
Republican	Tony Paynter (incumbent)	6,519	100.0
Total votes		65.19	100.0%
Republican hold			

=== District 26 ===
West Virginia's 26th House district general election, 2020
Party	Candidate	Votes	%
Democratic	Ed Evans (incumbent)	2,768	50.63
Republican	Wes Payne	2,699	49.37
Total votes		5,467	100.0%
Democratic hold			

=== District 27 ===
West Virginia's 27th House district general election, 2020 Elect three
Party	Candidate	Votes	%
Republican	Doug Smith	12,964	28.30
Republican	Marty Gearheart	12,853	28.05
Republican	Joe Ellington (incumbent)	12,370	27.00
Democratic	Tina Russell	7,629	16.65
Total votes		45,816	100.0%
Republican hold			
Republican hold			
Republican hold			

=== District 28 ===
West Virginia's 28th House district general election, 2020 Elect two
Party	Candidate	Votes	%
Republican	Roy Cooper (incumbent)	10,079	42.35
Republican	Jeffrey Pack (incumbent)	9,482	39.84
Democratic	Ryne Nahodil	4,239	17.81
Total votes		23,800	100.0%
Republican hold			
Republican hold			

=== District 29 ===
West Virginia's 29th House district general election, 2020
Party	Candidate	Votes	%
Republican	Brandon Steele (incumbent)	5,894	77.26
Democratic	Xavier Oglesby	1,735	22.74
Total votes		7,629	100.0%
Republican hold			

=== District 30 ===
West Virginia's 30th House district general election, 2020
Party	Candidate	Votes	%
Democratic	Mick Bates (incumbent)	4,622	60.00
Republican	Tyler Trump	3,081	40.00
Total votes		7,703	100.0%
Democratic hold			

=== District 31 ===
West Virginia's 31st House district general election, 2020
Party	Candidate	Votes	%
Republican	Chris Toney (incumbent)	6,706	100.0
Total votes		6,706	100.0%
Republican hold			

=== District 32 ===
West Virginia's 32nd House district general election, 2020 Elect three
Party	Candidate	Votes	%
Republican	Kayla Kessinger (incumbent)	10,760	22.56
Republican	Tom Fast (incumbent)	9,058	18.99
Republican	Austin Haynes	8,341	17.48
Democratic	Margaret Anne Staggers (incumbent)	7,264	15.23
Democratic	Mark Hurt	5,991	12.56
Democratic	Selina Vickers	6,290	13.19
Total votes		47,704	100.0%
Republican hold			
Republican hold			
Republican gain from Democratic			

=== District 33 ===
West Virginia's 33rd House district general election, 2020
Party	Candidate	Votes	%
Republican	Roger Hanshaw (incumbent)	4,811	68.40
Democratic	Larry Cottrell	2,223	31.60
Total votes		7,034	100.0%
Republican hold			

=== District 34 ===
West Virginia's 34th House district general election, 2020
Party	Candidate	Votes	%
Democratic	Brent Boggs (incumbent)	4,682	70.67
Republican	Leatha Williams	1,943	29.33
Total votes		6,625	100.0%
Democratic hold			

=== District 35 ===
West Virginia's 35th House district general election, 2020 Elect four
Party	Candidate	Votes	%
Republican	Moore Capito (incumbent)	16,021	15.67
Democratic	Doug Skaff (incumbent)	15,975	15.63
Republican	Larry Pack	12,431	12.16
Democratic	Kayla Young	12,323	12.05
Democratic	Kathy Ferguson	12,076	11.81
Democratic	Rusty Williams	12,035	11.77
Republican	Chris Stansbury	11,059	10.82
Republican	Trevor Morris	10,304	10.08
Total votes		102,224	100.0%
Republican hold			
Democratic hold			
Republican hold			
Democratic hold			

=== District 36 ===
West Virginia's 36th House district general election, 2020 Elect three
Party	Candidate	Votes	%
Democratic	Larry L. Rowe (incumbent)	10,355	20.44
Republican	Chris Pritt	8,508	16.79
Democratic	Jim Barach	8,490	16.76
Republican	Steve Thaxton	8,026	15.84
Democratic	Amanda Estep-Burton (incumbent)	7,743	15.28
Republican	Chris Walters	7,548	14.90
Total votes		50,670	100.0%
Democratic hold			
Democratic hold			
Republican gain from Democratic			

=== District 37 ===
West Virginia's 37th House district general election, 2020
Party	Candidate	Votes	%
Democratic	Mike Pushkin (incumbent)	4,900	100.0
Total votes		4,900	100.0%
Democratic hold			

=== District 38 ===
West Virginia's 38th House district general election, 2020
Party	Candidate	Votes	%
Republican	Dianna Graves (incumbent)	6,037	65.14
Democratic	Nikki Ardman	3,231	34.86
Total votes		9,268	100.0%
Republican hold			

=== District 39 ===
West Virginia's 39th House district general election, 2020
Party	Candidate	Votes	%
Republican	Dana Ferrell	5,292	67.48
Democratic	David Holmes	2,550	32.52
Total votes		7,842	100.0%
Republican hold			

=== District 40 ===
West Virginia's 40th House district general election, 2020
Party	Candidate	Votes	%
Republican	Dean Jeffries (incumbent)	6,764	100.0
Total votes		6,764	100.0%
Republican hold			

=== District 41 ===
West Virginia's 41st House district general election, 2020
Party	Candidate	Votes	%
Republican	Heather Tully	5,725	73.29
Democratic	Duane Bragg	2,086	26.71
Total votes		7,811	100.0%
Republican hold			

=== District 42 ===
West Virginia's 42nd House district general election, 2020 Elect two
Party	Candidate	Votes	%
Republican	Barry Bruce	8,236	29.47
Republican	Todd Longanacre	7,450	26.65
Democratic	Jeff Campbell (incumbent)	6,533	23.37
Democratic	Cindy Lavender-Bowe (incumbent)	5,732	20.51
Total votes		27,951	100.0%
Republican gain from Democratic			
Republican gain from Democratic			

=== District 43 ===
West Virginia's 43rd House district general election, 2020 Elect two
Party	Candidate	Votes	%
Republican	Ty Nestor	8,070	31.86
Democratic	Cody Thompson (incumbent)	6,644	26.23
Democratic	William G. Hartman (incumbent)	6,085	24.02
Republican	Mark Rennix	4,534	17.90
Total votes		25,333	100.0%
Democratic hold			
Republican gain from Democratic			

=== District 44 ===
West Virginia's 44th House district general election, 2020
Party	Candidate	Votes	%
Republican	Caleb Hanna (incumbent)	4,332	63.92
Democratic	Robin Cutlip	2,445	36.08
Total votes		6,777	100.0%
Republican hold			

=== District 45 ===
West Virginia's 45th House district general election, 2020
Party	Candidate	Votes	%
Republican	Carl Martin (incumbent)	6,490	100.0
Total votes		6,490	100.0%
Republican hold			

=== District 46 ===
West Virginia's 46th House district general election, 2020
Party	Candidate	Votes	%
Republican	Adam Burkhammer	5,362	64.12
Democratic	Robert Stultz	2,516	30.09
Libertarian	Michael Lockard	484	5.79
Total votes		8,362	100.0%
Republican hold			

=== District 47 ===
West Virginia's 47th House district general election, 2020
Party	Candidate	Votes	%
Republican	Chris Phillips (incumbent)	5,018	64.46
Democratic	Ed Larry	2,767	35.54
Total votes		7,785	100.0%
Republican hold			

=== District 48 ===
West Virginia's 48th House district general election, 2020 Elect four
Party	Candidate	Votes	%
Republican	Ben Queen (incumbent)	16,706	16.35
Republican	Danny Hamrick (incumbent)	14,642	14.33
Republican	Laura Kimble	14,495	14.19
Republican	Clay Riley	13,559	13.27
Democratic	Richard Iaquinta	12,083	11.83
Democratic	Josh Maxwell	9,831	9.62
Democratic	Robert Garcia	9,785	9.58
Democratic	Ryan Deems	7,297	7.14
Libertarian	Will Hyman	2,275	2.23
Mountain	Steve Hamilton	1,476	1.44
Total votes		102,149	100.0
Republican hold			
Republican hold			
Republican hold			
Republican gain from Democratic			

=== District 49 ===
West Virginia's 49th House district general election, 2020
Party	Candidate	Votes	%
Republican	Amy Summers (incumbent)	5,091	62.03
Democratic	Mike Manypenny	3,116	37.97
Total votes		8,207	100.0%
Republican hold			

=== District 50 ===
West Virginia's 50th House district general election, 2020 Elect three
Party	Candidate	Votes	%
Republican	Guy Ward	11,334	18.23
Republican	Phil Mallow	11,178	17.98
Democratic	Joey Garcia	10,917	17.56
Democratic	Michael Angelucci (incumbent)	10,852	17.46
Democratic	Ronald Straight	9,400	15.12
Republican	Darton Mcintire	8,477	13.64
Total votes		62,158	100.0%
Democratic hold			
Republican gain from Democratic			
Republican gain from Democratic			

=== District 51 ===
West Virginia's 51st House district general election, 2020 Elect five
Party	Candidate	Votes	%
Democratic	Barbara Fleischauer (incumbent)	19,718	11.85
Democratic	Evan Hansen (incumbent)	18,800	11.30
Republican	Joe Statler	18,304	11.00
Democratic	Danielle Walker (incumbent)	17,931	10.78
Democratic	John Williams (incumbent)	17,737	10.66
Republican	Cindy Frich	17,707	10.64
Democratic	Rodney Pyles (incumbent)	17,689	10.63
Republican	Justin White	14,187	8.53
Republican	Todd Stainbrook	12,204	7.33
Republican	Zach Lemaire	12,134	7.29
Total votes		166,408	100.0%
Democratic hold			
Democratic hold			
Democratic hold			
Democratic hold			
Republican gain from Democratic			

=== District 52 ===
West Virginia's 52nd House district general election, 2020
Party	Candidate	Votes	%
Republican	Terri Funk Sypolt (incumbent)	4,816	61.12
Democratic	Junior Wolfe	2,938	38.88
Total votes		7,556	100.0%
Republican hold			

=== District 53 ===
West Virginia's 53rd House district general election, 2020
Party	Candidate	Votes	%
Republican	Buck Jennings (incumbent)	6,168	68.79
Democratic	Cory Chase	2,798	31.21
Total votes		8,966	100.0%
Republican hold			

=== District 54 ===
West Virginia's 54th House district general election, 2020
Party	Candidate	Votes	%
Republican	John Paul Hott (incumbent)	7,597	100.0
Total votes		7,597	100.0%
Republican hold			

=== District 55 ===
West Virginia's 55th House district general election, 2020
Party	Candidate	Votes	%
Republican	Bryan Ward	6,171	71.66
Democratic	Jarod Shockey	2,440	28.34
Total votes		8,611	100.0%
Republican gain from Democratic			

=== District 56 ===
West Virginia's 56th House district general election, 2020
Party	Candidate	Votes	%
Republican	Gary Howell (incumbent)	7,132	100.0
Total votes		7,132	100.0%
Republican hold			

=== District 57 ===
West Virginia's 57th House district general election, 2020
Party	Candidate	Votes	%
Republican	Ruth Rowan (incumbent)	6,999	100.0
Total votes		6,999	100.0%
Republican hold			

=== District 58 ===
West Virginia's 58th House district general election, 2020
Party	Candidate	Votes	%
Republican	George Miller	6,555	76.01
Democratic	Tom Harden	2,069	23.99
Total votes		8,624	100.0%
Republican hold			

=== District 59 ===
West Virginia's 59th House district general election, 2020
Party	Candidate	Votes	%
Republican	Ken Reed	7,338	71.49
Independent	Patricia Adams	1,655	16.13
Mountain	Robert Smith	1,271	12.38
Total votes		10,265	100.0%
Republican hold			

=== District 60 ===
West Virginia's 60th House district general election, 2020
Party	Candidate	Votes	%
Republican	Don Forsht	6,163	66.93
Democratic	Brad Noll	2,556	27.76
Mountain	Mary Kinnie	489	5.31
Total votes		9,208	100.0%
Republican gain from Independent			

=== District 61 ===
West Virginia's 61st House district general election, 2020
Party	Candidate	Votes	%
Democratic	Jason Barrett (incumbent)	4,273	58.49
Republican	Kim Mongan-Saladini	3,033	41.51
Total votes		7,306	100.0%
Democratic hold			

=== District 62 ===
West Virginia's 62nd House district general election, 2020
Party	Candidate	Votes	%
Republican	Charles Horst	6,247	67.09
Democratic	Debi Carroll	3,065	32.91
Total votes		9,312	100.0%
Republican hold			

=== District 63 ===
West Virginia's 63rd House district general election, 2020
Party	Candidate	Votes	%
Republican	John Hardy (incumbent)	4,684	56.30
Democratic	Daniel Bennett	3,091	37.16
Libertarian	Brett Rogers	544	6.54
Total votes		8,319	100.0%
Republican hold			

=== District 64 ===
West Virginia's 64th House district general election, 2020
Party	Candidate	Votes	%
Republican	Eric Householder (incumbent)	7,366	100.0
Total votes		7,366	100.0%
Republican hold			

=== District 65 ===
West Virginia's 65th House district general election, 2020
Party	Candidate	Votes	%
Republican	Wayne Clark	4,576	50.69
Democratic	Sammi Brown (incumbent)	4,451	49.31
Total votes		9,027	100.0%
Republican gain from Democratic			

=== District 66 ===
West Virginia's 66th House district general election, 2020
Party	Candidate	Votes	%
Republican	Paul Espinosa (incumbent)	5,258	60.94
Democratic	Storme Frame	3,370	39.06
Total votes		8,628	100.0%
Republican hold			

=== District 67 ===
West Virginia's 67th House district general election, 2020
Party	Candidate	Votes	%
Democratic	John Doyle (incumbent)	5,065	54.06
Republican	Elliot Simon	4,304	45.94
Total votes		9,369	100.0%
Democratic hold			
