= 2018 West Virginia House of Delegates election =

2018 West Virginia House of Delegates elections
- November 6, 2018

All 100 seats in the West Virginia House of Delegates 51 seats needed for a majority
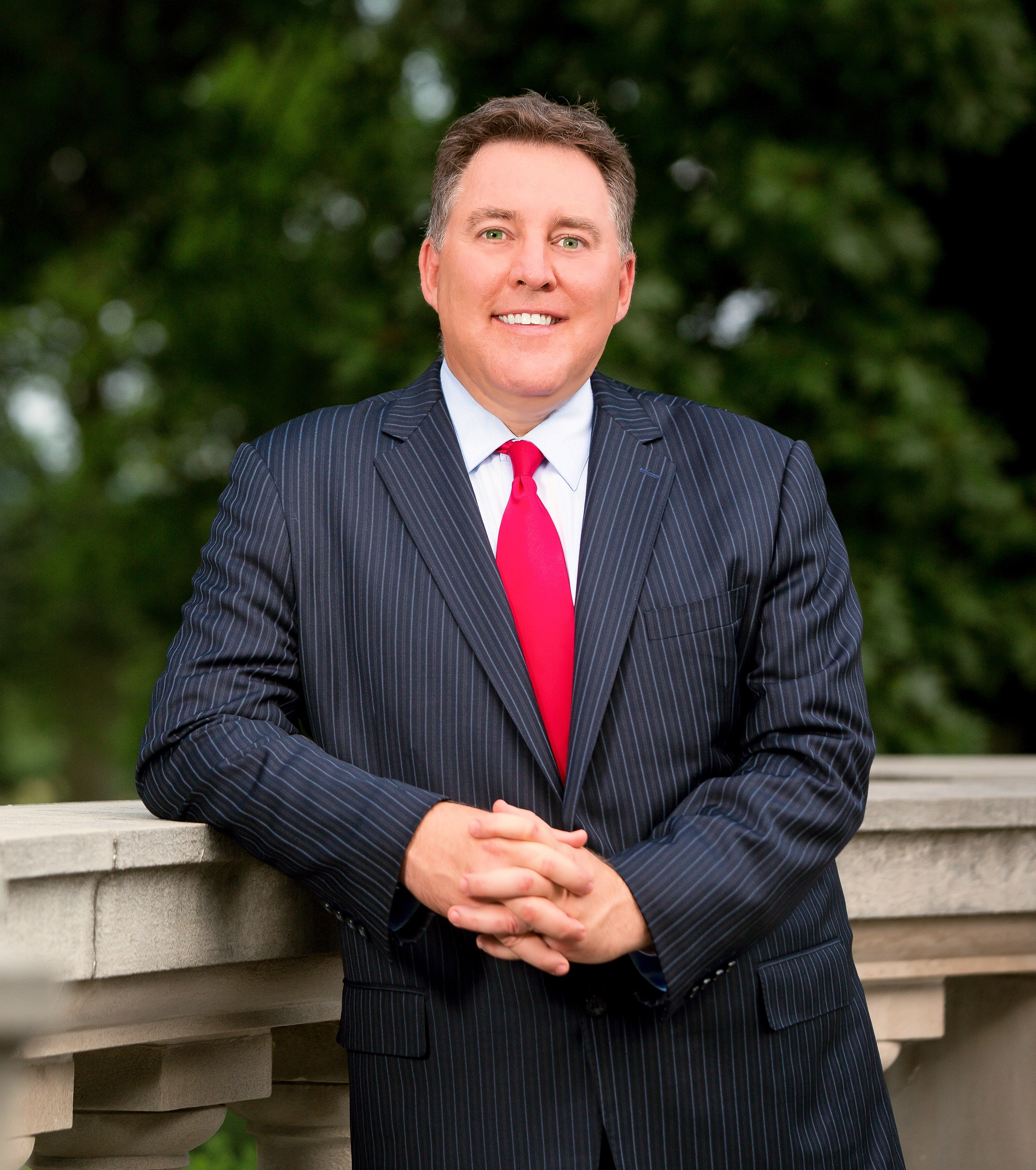
	Majority party	Minority party
	GOP
Leader	Roger Hanshaw	Tim Miley
Party	Republican	Democratic
Leader since	August 29, 2018	January 7, 2015
Leader's seat	33rd district	48th district
Seats before	63	37
Seats won	59	41
Seat change	▼4	▲4
Percentage	50.2%	48.3%
	Third party
Party	Independent
Seats before	0
Seats won	0
Percentage	1.6%
- Seat colors (boxes): Democratic gain Republican gain Democratic hold Republican hold District colors: Majority of members Democratic Majority of members Republican; Split
Speaker before election
Roger Hanshaw
Republican
Elected Speaker
Roger Hanshaw
Republican

Elections to the West Virginia House of Delegates took place on November 6, 2018. All the seats in the West Virginia House of Delegates were up for election.

== Overview ==
This election saw the Republican Party maintain their majority in the House of Delegates, although they sustained a net loss of 4 seats, being reduced from 63 seats to 59. The Democratic Party saw a net gain of 4 seats, from 37 to 41.

In the first sitting of the 84th legislature in January 2019, Roger Hanshaw was re-elected as Speaker of the West Virginia House of Delegates.

== Predictions ==
Source	Ranking	As of
Governing	Safe R	October 8, 2018

== Results ==
District	Representatives
District 1 (2 seats)	Pat McGeehan (Republican) Randy Swartzmiller (Democratic)
District 2	Phil Diserio (Democratic)
District 3 (2 seats)	Erikka Lynn Storch (Republican) Shawn Fluharty (Democratic)
District 4 (2 seats)	Joe Canestraro (Democratic) Lisa Zukoff (Democratic)
District 5	Dave Pethtel (Democratic)
District 6	David Kelly (Republican)
District 7	Jason Harshbarger (Republican)
District 8	Bill Anderson (Republican)
District 9	Ray Hollen (Republican)
District 10 (3 seats)	Vernon Criss (Republican) John R. Kelly (Republican) Tom Azinger (Republican)
District 11	Martin Atkinson III (Republican)
District 12	Steve Westfall (Republican)
District 13 (2 seats)	Joshua Higginbotham (Republican) Scott Cadle (Republican)
District 14	Jim Butler (Republican)
District 15	Geoff Foster (Republican)
District 16 (3 seats)	Sean Hornbuckle (Democratic) Daniel Linville (Republican) John Mandt (Republican)
District 17 (2 seats)	Matthew Rohrbach (Republican) Chad Lovejoy (Democratic)
District 18	Evan Worrell (Republican)
District 19 (2 seats)	Kenneth Hicks (Democratic) Robert Thompson (Democratic)
District 20	Nathan Brown (Republican)
District 21	Mark Dean (Republican)
District 22 (2 seats)	Zack Maynard (Republican) Joe Jeffries (Republican)
District 23	Rodney Miller (Democratic)
District 24 (2 seats)	Ralph Rodighiero (Democratic) Ted Tomblin (Democratic)
District 25	Tony Paynter (Republican)
District 26	Ed Evans (Republican)
District 27 (3 seats)	Joe Ellington (Republican) John Shott (Republican) Eric Porterfield (Republican)
District 28 (2 seats)	Roy Cooper (Republican) Jeffrey Pack (Republican)
District 29	Brandon Steele (Republican)
District 30	Mick Bates (Democratic)
District 31	Chris Toney (Republican)
District 32 (3 seats)	Tom Fast (Republican) Kayla Kessinger (Republican) Margaret Anne Staggers (Democratic)
District 33	Roger Hanshaw (Republican)
District 34	Brent Boggs (Democratic)
District 35 (4 seats)	Moore Capito (Republican) Eric Nelson (Republican) Andrew Byrd (Democratic) Doug Skaff (Democratic)
District 36 (3 seats)	Andrew Robinson (Democratic) Larry Rowe (Democratic) Amanda Estep-Burton (Democratic)
District 37	Mike Pushkin (Democratic)
District 38	Dianna Graves (Republican)
District 39	Sharon Malcolm (Republican)
District 40	Dean Jeffries (Republican)
District 41	Jordan Hill (Republican)
District 42 (2 seats)	Jeff Campbell (Democratic) Cindy Lavender-Bowe (Democratic)
District 43 (2 seats)	William G. Hartman (Democratic) Cody Thompson (Democratic)
District 44	Caleb Hanna (Republican)
District 45	Carl Martin (Republican)
District 46	Patrick S. Martin (Republican)
District 47	Chris Phillips (Republican)
District 48 (4 seats)	Danny Hamrick (Republican) Ben Queen (Republican) Terry Waxman (Republican) Timothy Miley (Democratic)
District 49	Amy Summers (Republican)
District 50 (3 seats)	Mike Caputo (Democratic) Linda Longstreth (Democratic) Michael Angelucci (Democratic)
District 51 (5 seats)	Barbara Fleischauer (Democratic) Rodney Pyles (Democratic) John Williams (Democratic) Evan Hansen (Democratic) Danielle Walker (Democratic)
District 52	Terri Funk Sypolt (Republican)
District 53	D. Rolland Jennings (Republican)
District 54	John Paul Hott (Republican)
District 55	Isaac Sponaugle (Democratic)
District 56	Gary Howell (Republican)
District 57	Ruth Rowan (Republican)
District 58	Daryl Cowles (Republican)
District 59	Larry Kump (Republican)
District 60	S. Marshall Wilson (Republican)
District 61	Jason Barrett (Democratic)
District 62	Tom Bibby (Republican)
District 63	John Hardy (Republican)
District 64	Eric Householder (Republican)
District 65	Sammi Brown (Democratic)
District 66	Paul Espinosa (Republican)
District 67	John Doyle (Democratic)
