= Elias Coop-Gonzalez =

American politician from West Virginia (born 2002)

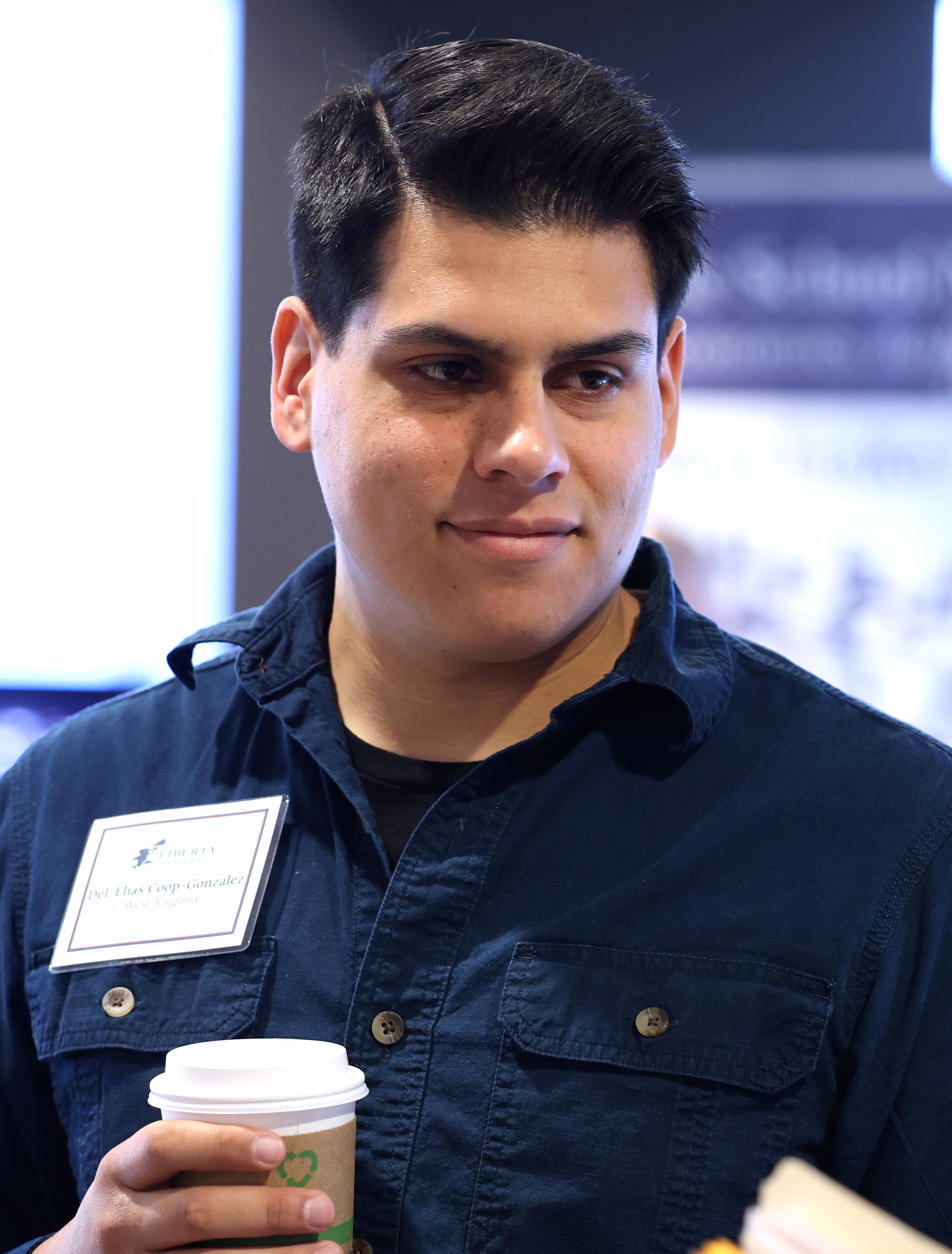
- Coop-Gonzalez at the 2024 Hazlitt Summit

Member of the West Virginia House of Delegates
- Incumbent
- Assumed office December 7, 2022
- Preceded by: Cody Thompson
- Constituency: 67th district

Personal details
- Born: Elías Gordén Coop-González; May 2, 2002 (age 24) Sololá, Guatemala
- Party: Republican
- Education: Tygart Valley Christian Academy
- Alma mater: Liberty University (BS)
- Website: Official website

Elias Coop-Gonzalez (/kuːp/; KuP Gon-Sales; born May 2, 2002) is an American politician. He currently serves as a member of the West Virginia House of Delegates for District 67, which encompasses Randolph County and Pendleton County, for the Republican Party. He assumed office on December 1, 2022. Coop-Gonzalez is among the youngest state legislators in the United States, running at age 19 and taking office at 20. He currently sits on four committees: Banking and Insurance, Energy and Manufacturing, Political Subdivisions, and Veterans Affairs/Homeland Security.

== Early life and education ==
Coop-Gonzalez was born May 2, 2002, in Guatemala to an American father and a Guatemalan mother. He is the second of three sons raised in Panajachel. After his parents' divorce, he moved to the United States at age 12. He finished growing up in Elkins, West Virginia and in 2020 was graduated as valedictorian from Tygart Valley Christian Academy. He has a degree in business administration and economics from Liberty University in Lynchburg, Virginia.

== Career ==
Coop-Gonzalez interned for congressman Alex Mooney and worked for the Leadership Institute, a co-educational non-profit in Arlington, Virginia. During Donald Trump's re-election campaign, he was the youngest member of the West Virginia delegation of the Republican National Convention.

In the 2022 West Virginia House of Delegates election, Coop-Gonzalez defeated the incumbent, civics teacher Cody Thompson (D). In the 2024 rematch between Coop-Gonzalez and Thompson, the former prevailed but saw his victory margin dwindle to nine points. His current term ends on December 1, 2026.

2022 Election
Party	Candidate	Votes	%
Republican	Elias Coop-Gonzalez	3490	60.29
Democratic	Cody Thompson	2299	39.71

2024 Election
Party	Candidate	Votes	%
Republican	Elias Coop-Gonzalez	4358	54.54
Democratic	Cody Thompson	3632	45.46
