= Tom Bibby =

American politician

Member of the West Virginia House of Delegates
- In office December 1, 2018 – December 1, 2020
- Constituency: District 62

Personal details
- Party: Republican

Tom Bibby is an American politician from West Virginia. He is a Republican and represented District 62 in the West Virginia House of Delegates from 2018 to 2020.
