= Rodney Miller (politician) =

American politician

Member of the West Virginia House of Delegates
- In office 2016 – December 1, 2020
- Constituency: District 23

Personal details
- Party: Democratic
- Education: West Virginia State University; West Virginia University Institute of Technology

Rodney Miller is an American politician from West Virginia. He is a Democrat and represented District 23 in the West Virginia House of Delegates from 2016 to 2020.

Miller is a retired sheriff and executive director of the West Virginia Sheriffs’ Association.
