= Andrew Anderson (West Virginia politician) =

American businessman and politician

Member of the West Virginia House of Delegates from the 35th district
- In office August 24, 2022 – December 1, 2022
- Preceded by: Larry Pack
- Succeeded by: New boundaries

Personal details
- Born: Andrew G. Anderson Cross Lanes, West Virginia, U.S.
- Party: Republican
- Spouse: Kristin
- Children: 4
- Education: West Virginia University (B.S.)
- Occupation: Business development officer

Andrew Anderson is an American businessman and politician who served as a member West Virginia House of Delegates from the 35th district. He was appointed by Jim Justice on August 19, 2022. In the 2022 House of Delegates election to the 56th district, Anderson lost in a narrow race to Democrat Kayla Young.

West Virginia's 56th House of Delegates district, 2022
Party	Candidate	Votes	%
Democratic	Kayla Young (incumbent)	2,886	50.5
Republican	Andrew Anderson (incumbent)	2,828	49.5
Total votes		5,714	100.0
Democratic win (new boundaries)			

2022 results by precinct: Anderson: Anderson—50–60%; Anderson—60–70%; Anderson—70–80%; Young: Young—50–60%; Young—60–70%; Young—70–80%
