= Kayla Young =

American politician (born 1988)

Member of the West Virginia House of Delegates
- Incumbent
- Assumed office December 1, 2020
- Preceded by: Amanda Estep-Burton; Andrew Robinson
- Constituency: 35th district (2020-2022); 56th district (2022–present)

Personal details
- Born: July 12, 1988 (age 38)
- Party: Democratic
- Spouse: 1
- Children: 2
- Education: West Virginia University (BA, MS)

Kayla Ann Young (born July 12, 1988) is an American politician serving as a member of the West Virginia House of Delegates from the 56th district. (Originally the 35th, a multi-member district) Elected in November 2020, she assumed office on December 1, 2020.

== Education ==
Young earned a Bachelor of Arts degree in interdisciplinary studies and a Master of Science in integrated marketing from West Virginia University.

== Career ==
Prior to entering politics, Young founded small businesses and non-profit organizations. She also worked in government relations for the West Virginia Environmental Council. She was elected to the West Virginia House of Delegates in November 2020 and assumed office on December 1, 2020. She also served as the minority vice chair of the House Agriculture and Natural Resources Committee and House Small Business, Entrepreneurship, and Economic Development Committee. Currently she is the Minority Pro Tempore of the West Virginia House of Delegates.
