= Dianna Graves =

American politician

Member of the West Virginia House of Delegates from the 38th district
- In office September 19, 2017 – December 1, 2022
- Preceded by: Nancy Reagan Foster
- Succeeded by: New boundaries

Personal details
- Born: Euless, Texas, U.S.
- Party: Republican
- Education: Stanford University (BA)

Dianna Graves is an American politician and accountant who served as a member of the West Virginia House of Delegates from the 38th district from 2017 to 2022. She was appointed to the House on September 19, 2017.

== Early life and education ==
Graves was born in Euless, Texas. She earned a Bachelor of Arts degree in political science from Stanford University.

== Career ==
Graves was a member of the Kanawha County Republican Executive Committee. She has worked as an accountant at Suttle & Stalnaker CPAs and Arnett Carbis Toothman. She was appointed to the West Virginia House of Delegates and assumed office on September 19, 2017, succeeding Nancy Reagan Foster. During the 2019–2020 legislative session, Graves served as vice chair of the House Pensions and Retirement Committee.

In the 2022 West Virginia House of Delegates election, Graves was defeated in the Republican primary in District 59 by Andy Shamblin.

In January 2025, Governor‑elect Patrick Morrisey announced that Graves was appointed Commissioner of the Bureau of Senior Services.
