= Josh Booth (politician) =

American politician

Member of the West Virginia House of Delegates from the 19th district
- In office February 10, 2021 – December 1, 2022
- Preceded by: Derrick Evans
- Succeeded by: New boundaries

Personal details
- Born: Joshua Booth; October 29, 1979 (age 46) Huntington, West Virginia
- Party: Republican
- Education: Degree in business administration, Marshall University

Joshua Booth (born October 29, 1979) is an American politician who served as a Delegate from the 19th District to the West Virginia House of Delegates from 2021 to 2022. Booth is a Republican.

== Early life, education, and career ==
Booth was born in Huntington, West Virginia to Jeffery and Lisa Booth. Booth received a degree in business administration at Marshall University in 2004. He was employed at a highway and traffic construction firm before assuming office.

== Elections ==
=== 2021 appointment ===
On January 27, 2021, West Virginia governor Jim Justice appointed Booth to fill the seat of Delegate Derrick Evans. Evans was forced to resign after he was arrested after participating in the 2021 United States Capitol attack. A dispute arose when the Wayne County Republican Executive Committee claimed that the governor had unlawfully appointed Booth by not choosing from their submitted list of candidates. On February 9, 2021, the West Virginia Supreme Court ruled in favor of the governor. Booth was formally sworn in the following day. The Court reaffirmed their decision in June 2021.

== Tenure ==
=== Committee assignments ===
- Government Organization
- Senior, Children, and Family Issues
- Technology & Infrastructure

=== Transgender rights ===
Booth voted for Senate Bill 341, a bill that would prohibit transgender athletes from competing on sports teams that align with their gender identity.

=== Worker's rights ===
Booth voted for SB 11, a bill that would make it more difficult for employees to strike.

== Personal life ==
Booth is married to Stacy Booth and has two children. He is a Baptist.
