= Andy Shamblin =

American politician

Andy Shamblin is an American politician from West Virginia. He is a Republican and represents District 59 in the West Virginia House of Delegates since 2022.

Shamblin is a school teacher and member of the city council in Nitro.
