= Andrew Robinson (West Virginia politician) =

American politician

Member of the West Virginia House of Delegates
- In office 2016 – December 1, 2020
- Constituency: District 36

Personal details
- Party: Democratic

Andrew Robinson is an American politician from West Virginia. He is a Democrat and represented District 36 in the West Virginia House of Delegates from 2016 to 2020.
