= Amanda Estep-Burton =

American politician

Member of the West Virginia House of Delegates
- In office December 1, 2018 – December 1, 2020
- Constituency: District 36

Personal details
- Party: Democratic

Amanda Estep-Burton is an American politician from West Virginia. She is a Democrat and represented District 36 in the West Virginia House of Delegates from 2018 to 2020.

In 2022, she ran for Kanawha County Clerk.
