= Bob Fehrenbacher =

American politician

Member of the West Virginia House of Delegates from the 11th district
- In office December 1, 2022 – December 1, 2026
- Preceded by: Riley Keaton

Personal details
- Party: Republican

Robert J. Fehrenbacher is an American politician from West Virginia. He is a Republican and represents District 11 in the West Virginia House of Delegates since 2022.

Fehrenbacher is a graduate from University of Texas at Austin. He is a retired manager of Chemours' Washington Works plant.

Fehrenbacher ran in the Republican primary for the West Virginia State Senate to represent District 3 in the 2026 West Virginia Senate election. He was defeated by incumbent Mike Azinger.
