= Shannon Kimes =

American politician

Member of the West Virginia House of Delegates from the 9th district
- In office December 1, 2020 – December 1, 2022
- Preceded by: Chuck Little
- Succeeded by: New boundaries

Personal details
- Born: Dennis "Shannon" Kimes; April 6, 1977 (age 49) Rockport, West Virginia, U.S.
- Party: Republican
- Spouse: Erica J. Kimes
- Education: B.E., Case Western Reserve University

Dennis Shannon Kimes (born April 6, 1977) is an American politician who served as a Delegate from the 9th district to the West Virginia House of Delegates from 2020 to 2022. Kimes is a Republican.

== Early life, education, and career ==
Kimes was born in Rockport, West Virginia to Dennis and Charlotte Kimes. He has a Bachelor of Engineering from Case Western Reserve University. Before taking office, Kimes operated a company that manufactured railroad construction materials.

== Elections ==
=== 2020 ===
Kimes won his primary election against incumbent Chuck Little, who had been appointed by West Virginia governor Jim Justice, with Kimes receiving 58.53% of the vote.

In the general election, Kimes defeated Democrat Jim Marion with 70.31% of the vote.

=== 2022 ===
Kimes lost his primary election in the 14th district to Dave Foggin.

== Tenure ==
=== Committee assignments ===
- Banking and Insurance
- Government Organization
- Political Subdivisions
- Workforce Development

=== Legislature size ===
In the House of Delegates, Kimes introduced House Joint Resolution 29, which would introduce a constitutional amendment on the ballot to reduce the number of Delegates and State Senators by half. Kimes cited differences in represented populations between West Virginia and other states.

=== Spending ===
Kimes criticized Justice for declining to use much of the relief money from the 2020 CARES Act. He was the lead sponsor of House Bill 2014, which would emphasize the Legislature's role in the allocation of federal funds and limiting the governor's control over those funds.

== Personal life ==
Kimes is married to Erica Kimes and has three children. He is a Christian.
