= Jim Butler (West Virginia politician) =

American politician

Member of the West Virginia House of Delegates
- Assuming office December 1, 2022
- Succeeding: New boundaries
- Constituency: 18th district
- In office December 1, 2012 – December 1, 2020
- Preceded by: Troy Andes
- Succeeded by: Johnnie Wamsley
- Constituency: 14th district

Personal details
- Born: James Harry Butler; September 18, 1965 (age 60)
- Party: Republican
- Website: jimbutler.us

Military service
- Branch/service: United States Marine Corps

James Harry Butler is an American politician who has served as a Republican member of the West Virginia House of Delegates from the 18th district since 2022. He previously represented the 14th district from 2012 to 2020.

== Elections ==
- 2012 With District 14 incumbent Republican Representative Troy Andes redistricted to District 15, Butler ran in the three-way May 8, 2012 Republican Primary and placed first with 710 votes (41.1%), and won the November 6, 2012 General election with 3,368 votes (54.2%) against Democratic nominee Jimmie Wood.
- 2022 After 2020 redistricting, Butler ran against Johnnie Wamsley, his 2020 successor, for the 18th district. Butler defeated Wamsley in a primary, and went unchallenged.
