= Johnnie Wamsley =

American politician

Member of the West Virginia House of Delegates from the 14th district
- In office December 1, 2020 – December 1, 2022
- Preceded by: Jim Butler
- Succeeded by: Dave Foggin

Personal details
- Born: Johnnie Andrew Wamsley II; March 5, 1988 (age 38) Point Pleasant, West Virginia
- Party: Republican
- Education: Marshall University

Johnnie Andrew Wamsley II (born March 5, 1988) is an American politician who served as a Delegate from the 14th District to the West Virginia House of Delegates from 2020 to 2022. Wamsley is a Republican.

== Early life, education, and career ==
Wamsley was born in Point Pleasant, West Virginia to Vicky and Johnnie Wamsley. He served in the United States Marine Corps from 2007 to 2015 and earned a degree in finance at Marshall University in 2019. He was employed as a credit analyst with various banks after leaving the Marine Corps.

== Elections ==
=== 2020 ===
In his first primary for the 14th District, Wamsley defeated fellow Republican Brian Scott with 51.97% of the vote. There were no incumbents in the race.

In the general election, Wamsley defeated Democrat Chris Yeager with 69.37% of the vote.

== Tenure ==
=== Committee assignments ===
- Education
- Energy and Manufacturing
- Small Business and Economic Development
- Veterans Affairs and Homeland Security
- Workforce Development

Wamsley is an assistant majority whip in the House of Delegates.

For the 2020 election, Wamsley had an "AQ" rating and endorsement from the NRA Political Victory Fund.

=== Freedom of speech ===
Wamsley was a sponsor of House Bill 2595, a bill that would prohibit so-called "divisive concepts" from being taught in West Virginia schools or promoted in other state-funded agencies. It targeted criticisms of American society, eliminating language that would refer to the US as a "fundamentally racist or sexist" country.

=== Transgender rights ===
Wamsley supported Senate Bill 341, a bill that would prohibit transgender athletes from competing on the team that aligns with their gender identity.

=== Worker's rights ===
Wamsley opposed SB 11, a bill that would make it more difficult for employees to strike.

== Personal life ==
Wamsley has two children. He is a Catholic.
