= Roger Conley =

American politician

Member of the West Virginia House of Delegates from the 10th district
- In office December 1, 2020 – December 1, 2022
- Preceded by: Tom Azinger
- Succeeded by: New boundaries

Personal details
- Born: Roger Conley; September 9, 1956 (age 69) Parkersburg, West Virginia, U.S.
- Party: Constitution (2024–present)
- Other political affiliations: Republican (until 2024)
- Spouse: Katherine Conley

Roger Conley (born September 9, 1956) the son of Rev. Melvin and Maxine conley is an American politician who served as a Delegate from the 10th district to the West Virginia House of Delegates from 2020 to 2022. Previously a Republican, Conley switched his affiliation to the Constitution Party in December 2024.

In 2022, he was defeated in the District 11 Republican primary by Bob Fehrenbacher.

== Early life, education, and career ==
Conley was born in Parkersburg, West Virginia to Melvin and Maxine Conley. He was educated at West Virginia University at Parkersburg, a community college. Before running for office, Conley was employed in the manufacturing industry for 30 years, owning his own company for 12. Conley also served on the City Council of Vienna, West Virginia from 2016 to 2020.

== Elections ==
=== 2020 ===
In a four-way primary, Conley was one of three Republicans to receive the nomination, with 25.39% of the vote.

In the general election, Conley was elected to the House of Delegates with the same two fellow Republicans, receiving 22.25% of the vote.

== Tenure ==
=== Committee assignments ===
- Government Organization
- Veterans Affairs and Homeland Security
- Workforce Development

=== Transgender rights ===
Conley supported a bill that would prohibit transgender athletes from competing on the team that aligns with their gender identity and was the sponsor of a similar bill.

== Personal life ==
Conley is married to Katherine Conley and has three children. 5 siblings He is a Baptist.
