= Lisa Zukoff =

American politician

Member of the West Virginia House of Delegates from the 4th district
- In office December 1, 2018 – December 1, 2022
- Preceded by: Michael Ferro
- Succeeded by: New boundaries

Personal details
- Born: February 27, 1962 (age 64)
- Party: Democratic
- Spouse: Jack Zukoff
- Education: BA, political science, West Virginia University; Wheeling Jesuit University
- Website: lisazukoff.com

Lisa Beth Zukoff (nee Bixby; born February 27, 1962) is an American politician and businesswoman. She served as a Democratic member of the West Virginia House of Delegates from the 4th district.

== Early life ==
Zukoff was born on February 27, 1962, to parents Richard Bixby and Linda Whorton Bixby. She graduated from John Marshall High School and earned a Bachelor of Arts degree in political science from West Virginia University.

== Career ==
Prior to joining politics, Zukoff was an executive director of the Wheeling Housing Authority, Accessories Ltd, and operated a business consulting firm. She announced her bid to run for the 4th District West Virginia House Seat in 2017 to replace Michael Ferro. Zukoff was sworn into office on December 17, 2018. She ran for re-election following her first term and served alongside Republican Charlie Reynolds.

Upon winning her re-election, Zukoff was assigned to the House Technology and Infrastructure Committee, Agriculture and Natural Resources Committee, and the education committees. She was later named Assistant minority whip by Shawn Fluharty.

== Personal life ==
Zukoff and her husband Jack have two children together.
