= Chris Pritt =

American politician

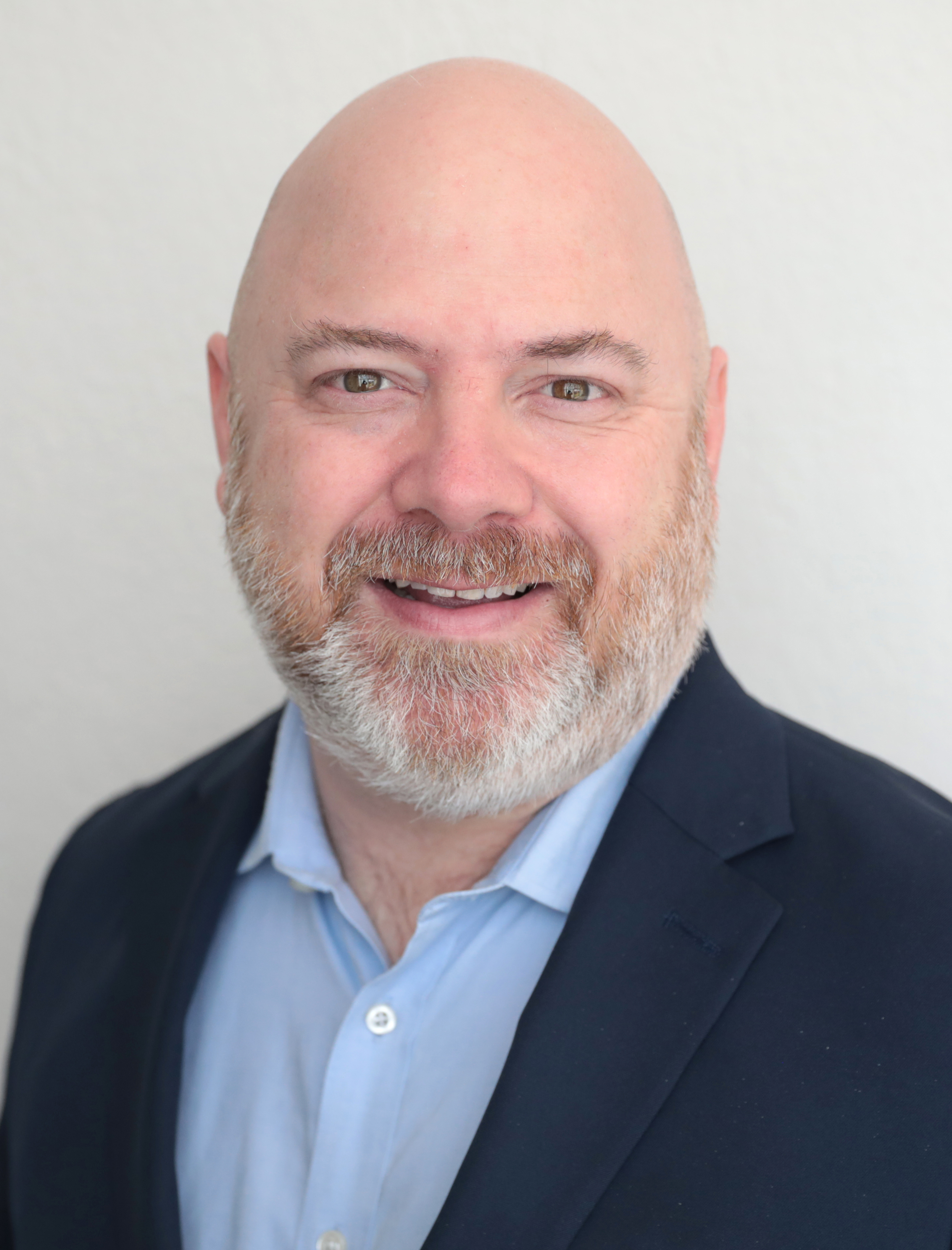
- Pritt in 2022

West Virginia House of Delegates
- In office December 1, 2020 – December 1, 2024

Personal details
- Born: November 17, 1978 (age 47) Stuart, Virginia, U.S.
- Party: Republican
- Spouse: Kelly Pritt
- Children: 2
- Education: West Virginia Wesleyan College (BA); Virginia Tech (MPA); Ohio Northern University (JD)

Chris Pritt (born November 17, 1978) is an American politician who served as a member of the West Virginia House of Delegates from 2020 to 2024. Elected in November 2020, he assumed office on December 1, 2020.

== Early life and education ==
Pritt was born in Stuart, Virginia. He earned a Bachelor of Arts degree in English from West Virginia Wesleyan College, a Master of Public Administration from Virginia Tech, and a Juris Doctor from the Claude W. Pettit College of Law at Ohio Northern University.

== Career ==
Since 2007, Pritt has owned and operated Pritt & Pritt LLC with his wife, Kelly. He was elected to the West Virginia House of Delegates in November 2020 and assumed office on December 1, 2020. He later ran for the West Virginia State Senate in the 17th District.
