= Riley Keaton =

American politician

Member of the West Virginia House of Delegates from the 15th district district
- In office December 1, 2022 – October 12, 2023
- Preceded by: Geoff Foster
- Succeeded by: Erica Moore

Member of the West Virginia House of Delegates from the 11th district district
- In office December 1, 2020 – 2022
- Preceded by: Rick Atkinson
- Succeeded by: Bob Fehrenbacher

Personal details
- Born: Nicholas Riley Keaton; August 19, 1997 (age 28) Spencer, West Virginia, U.S.
- Party: Republican
- Education: Roane County High School

Nicholas Riley Keaton (born August 9, 1997) is an American politician who served as a Delegate to the West Virginia House of Delegates from 2020 to 2023. Keaton is a Republican.

== Early life, education, and career ==
Keaton was born in Spencer, West Virginia, to Tony and Tracey Keaton. He studied for his Bachelor of Economics degree at West Virginia University. As a teenager, Keaton was politically active. Before assuming office, Keaton was employed as the president of a limited liability company.

== Elections ==
=== 2016 ===
In his first primary, Keaton narrowly lost to incumbent Rick Atkinson in a three-way race, receiving 37.36% of the vote and missing the nomination by only 28 votes.

=== 2020 ===
In the 2020 primary, Keaton defeated Atkinson with 52.01% of the vote to win the nomination.

In the general election, Keaton defeated Democrat Mark Pauley with 66.46% of the vote.

=== 2022 ===
In 2022, Keaton's district changed following the states redistricting. He was once again up against Rick Atkinson in the primary. On May 10, 2022, he went on to win the primary with 56% of the vote to Atkinson's 44%.

In the general election, Keaton defeated Democrat Chuck Conner with 30.1% of the vote.

== Tenure ==
=== Committee assignments ===
- Banking and Insurance
- Judiciary
- Small Business and Economic Development
- Technology & Infrastructure

Keaton is an assistant majority whip in the House of Delegates.

Keaton has an "A" rating from the NRA Political Victory Fund and a 100% rating from the West Virginia Citizens Defense League, a regional gun rights organization.

=== DC statehood ===
With many of his fellow Delegates, Keaton signed onto a resolution requesting West Virginia Senators and Congresspeople to oppose bills that would allow statehood for the District of Columbia.

=== Education ===
Keaton opposed Senate Bill 680, a bill that would make it harder for school staff to be given raises, but the bill passed the House of Delegates despite some Republican opposition.

=== Freedom of speech ===
Keaton was the lead sponsor of House Bill 2595, a bill that would prohibit so-called "divisive concepts" from being taught in West Virginia schools or promoted in other state-funded agencies. It targeted criticisms of American society, eliminating language that would refer to the US as a "fundamentally racist or sexist" country.

=== Worker's rights ===
Keaton voted for SB 11, a bill that would make it more difficult for employees to strike.

== Resignation ==
On October 12, 2023, Keaton formally resigned from his position in the West Virginia House of Delegates, stating on his Facebook that he has accepted a legislative role with the Jim Justice Administration’s Department of Human Services.

== Personal life ==
Keaton is a Catholic. On October 8, 2022, Keaton married Sadie Shields at the Basilica of the Co-Cathedral of the Sacred Heart in Charleston.
