= John R. Kelly =

American politician

Member of the West Virginia House of Delegates from the 10th district
- Incumbent
- Assumed office 2014

Personal details
- Born: September 23, 1946 (age 79) Parkersburg, West Virginia
- Party: Republican

John R. Kelly (born September 23, 1946) is an American Republican Party politician, who has represented Wood County in the West Virginia House of Delegates since 2014.

== Early life ==
Kelly was born on September 23, 1946, in Parkersburg, West Virginia. He attended Glenville State College, Parkersburg Community College and Mountain State University. He was in the United States Air Force from August 1967 to February 1971. While in the Air Force, he was as an honor guard from December 1968 until February 1971 and served at the Tomb of the Unknown Soldier.

== Political career ==
Kelly was a member of the Parkersburg City Council from 1985 to 1996 and from 2013 to 2014. He was first elected to the West Virginia House of Delegates in 2014. As of 2021 he is chair of the House of Delegates' interim committee on natural gas development.

=== Critical Infrastructure Protection Act ===
In 2020 Kelly sponsored the Critical Infrastructure Protection Act, which created felony penalties for protests targeting oil and gas facilities. The law, which was passed with the support of Dominion Energy, the West Virginia Oil and Natural Gas Association, and the American Fuel and Petrochemical Manufacturers trade association, was described by Kelly as having been "requested by the natural gas industry".

=== Election results ===
Kelly was one of three candidates elected to represent the 10th district in 2018, with 20 percent of the vote, alongside fellow Republicans Tom Azinger and Vernon Criss. He was again one of three Republicans elected to represent to the 10th district in 2020, along with Criss and Roger Conley.
