= Chad Lovejoy =

American politician

Circuit Court Judge of the Sixth Judicial Cricut
- Incumbent
- Assumed office January 17, 2025

Member of the West Virginia House of Delegates from the 17th district
- In office December 1, 2016 – December 1, 2022
- Preceded by: Doug Reynolds
- Succeeded by: New boundaries

Personal details
- Born: September 15, 1973 (age 52) Huntington, West Virginia, U.S.
- Party: Democratic
- Education: West Virginia University (BA, JD)

Chad Lovejoy (born September 15, 1973) is an American politician who served in the West Virginia House of Delegates from the 17th district from 2016 to 2022. Lovejoy was elected to the office of Circuit Court Judge in the 2024 Primary Election he is currently serving in that role.
