= Ed Evans =

American politician (born 1959)

Member of the West Virginia House of Delegates from the 26th district
- In office December 1, 2016 – December 1, 2022
- Preceded by: Clif Moore
- Succeeded by: New boundaries

Personal details
- Born: February 9, 1959 (age 67) Beckley, West Virginia, US
- Party: Democratic
- Spouse: Lynda Evans
- Education: BA, 1982, Glenville State College

Edward Evans (born February 9, 1959) is an American politician and former teacher. He served as a Democratic member of the West Virginia House of Delegates from the 26th district from 2016 to 2022.

== Early life ==
Evans was born on February 9, 1959, in Beckley, West Virginia to parents Mason and Eddie Jane Evans. He was educated at Woodrow Wilson High School and graduated from Glenville State College in 1982.

== Career ==
Upon graduating from college, Evans joined the faculty at Mount View High School as a science teacher. During his tenure at the school, he was elected president of the West Virginia Science Teacher's Association, served on the executive board of the Buckskin Council Boy Scouts of America, and was the president of the Welch Kiwanis Club. In 2008, he was the recipient of America's Top Science Teacher during a two-day competition at Goddard Space Flight Center. In 2016, Evans ran as a member of the Democratic to be elected into the West Virginia House of Delegates, beating Brian Harrison.
