= Geoff Foster (politician) =

American politician (born 1986)

Member of the West Virginia House of Delegates from the 20th district
- In office December 1, 2022 – December 1, 2024
- Preceded by: Nathan Brown
- Succeeded by: Sarah Drennan

Member of the West Virginia House of Delegates from the 15th district
- In office December 1, 2014 – 2022
- Preceded by: Troy Andes
- Succeeded by: Riley Keaton

Personal details
- Born: Geoffrey 'Geoff' Bruce Foster; May 10, 1986 (age 40) Charleston, West Virginia, U.S.
- Party: Republican
- Education: BS in psychology, University of Kentucky

Geoffrey Bruce Foster (born May 10, 1986) is an American politician who served in the West Virginia House of Delegates from 2014 to 2024. Foster has chaired the state's legislative Freedom Caucus since its formation in September 2023.

== Early life, education, and career ==
Foster was born in Charleston, West Virginia. He received his Bachelor of Science in psychology from the University of Kentucky. He is the owner of a construction supply company.

== Elections ==
=== 2014 ===
In his first primary election, Foster defeated fellow Republican Duke Jordan with 61.34% of the vote to win his party's nomination.

In the general, Foster did not face a Democrat and defeated Independent Christian Watts with 79.36% of the vote.

=== 2016 ===
In his second primary, Foster won the nomination unopposed.

In the general, he defeated Democrat Jeffery Smith with 65.24% of the vote.

=== 2018 ===
In the primary, Foster was opposed by fellow Republican Bryan Hastings, whom he defeated with 37.32% of the vote.

In the general, Foster received 64.13% of the vote to defeat Democrat Casey Wade Horton and unaffiliated candidate Theresa Jackson.

=== 2020 ===
In his 2020 primary, Foster ran unopposed.

In the general election, Foster defeated Democrat Theresa Jackson and Libertarian Michael Young with 62.45% of the vote.

== Tenure ==
=== Committee assignments ===
- Government Organization (Vice Chair)
- House Rules
- Political Subdivisions
- Workforce Development

=== Candidate ratings ===
As of 2019, Foster has a 100% lifetime rating from West Virginians for Life, a local anti-abortion group.

In 2018, Foster received an 88% rating from the West Virginia chapter of the United States Chamber of Commerce.

Also in 2018, Foster received an 89% rating from the American Conservative Union.

In 2018 and 2020 respectively, Foster received 0% ratings from the Sierra Club and the AFL–CIO.

=== COVID-19 pandemic ===
Foster voted for House Bill 335, which makes it more difficult for businesses to mandate the COVID-19 vaccine for their workers. The law made it easier for workers to use medical or religious exemptions to evade such mandates.

=== Healthcare ===
Foster was one of only four West Virginia legislators to vote against House Bill 4543, which capped the monthly copay for insulin at $100. Only three other Republican Delegates opposed the bill.

=== Transgender rights ===
Foster voted for Senate Bill 341, a bill that would prohibit transgender athletes from competing on the team that aligns with their gender identity.

=== Water Standards ===
Foster was supported a bill that would weaken certain water quality standards. Although the bill updates some standards, it raises the allowable concentrations of several chemicals, including some that are considered to be carcinogenic. The bill would also cede the power of West Virginia legislative committees to review changes to regulatory health criteria. The bill was criticized by local environmental groups as dangerous and irresponsible.

=== Worker's rights ===
Foster voted for SB 11, a bill that would make it more difficult for employees to strike.

Foster was the lead sponsor of House Bill 2009, which would prevent the direct collection of dues for labor unions representing public employees. Labor unions argued that direct collection of dues from paychecks was the most efficient means of raising revenue and eliminating that would result in significant cuts for the union. The law was initially suspended by lower courts but allowed by the West Virginia Supreme Court.

== Personal life ==
Foster is a Christian.
