= Larry L. Rowe =

American politician

Member of the West Virginia House of Delegates from the 36th district
- In office 1996–1998

Member of the West Virginia Senate
- In office 1996–2004
- Succeeded by: Dan Foster

Member of the West Virginia House of Delegates
- In office 2014–2024

Personal details
- Born: November 9, 1948 (age 77) Bluefield, West Virginia, US
- Party: Democratic
- Spouse: Julia M. Beury
- Education: West Virginia University (BA, MA, JD)

Larry Linwell Rowe is an American politician, historian, and author. He was a Democratic member of the West Virginia House of Delegates from the 36th and 52nd districts.

== Early life ==
Rowe was born to parents Rosa Rowe and Eldridge E. Rowe Sr in Bluefield, West Virginia, US. While attending West Virginia University, he was the elected a Member of their Sphinx Senior Men's Honorary Society after being placed on the dean's list for five semesters and maintaining a 3.65 grade point average. Rowe was also a member of the Debate team, Debate Society, and served as a member of the student cabinet. Rowe is a member of the Episcopal faith.

== Career ==
Upon graduating from West Virginia University, Rowe began working as a Senior Law Clerk for Kenneth Keller Hall in the United States Circuit Court from 1978 until 1979. Following this, he was the board chair for the Legal Aid Society of Charleston and volunteered for Manna Meal. While working as an attorney, he also began writing about the local history of West Virginia resulting in his book Virginia Slavery and King Salt in Booker T. Washington’s Boyhood Home. From 1996 until 1998, Rowe was elected a member of the West Virginia House of Delegates from the 36th district and spent four years as a member of the West Virginia Senate.
