= Mark Dean (politician) =

American politician

Member of the West Virginia House of Delegates from the 21st district
- Incumbent
- Assumed office December 1, 2016
- Preceded by: Phyllis White

Personal details
- Born: June 18, 1980 (age 46) Logan, West Virginia, U.S.
- Party: Republican

Mark Dean (born June 18, 1980) is an American politician who has served in the West Virginia House of Delegates from the 21st district since 2016.
