= Cody Thompson (politician) =

American politician (born 1987)

Member of the West Virginia House of Delegates from the 43rd district
- In office December 1, 2018 – December 1, 2022
- Preceded by: Phil Isner
- Succeeded by: New boundaries

Personal details
- Born: Cody Hansbrough Thompson; February 12, 1987 (age 39) Elkins, West Virginia, U.S.
- Party: Democratic
- Education: Marshall University (BA); West Virginia University (MA)
- Occupation: Teacher
- Website: www.codyforwv.com

Cody Hansbrough Thompson (born February 12, 1987) is an American politician and educator, who was elected to the West Virginia House of Delegates in the 2018 elections. He represented the 43rd House District, which included Randolph County and Pocahontas County, as a member of the Democratic Party. He was defeated by Elias Coop-Gonzalez in 2022.

== Politics ==
Thompson ran for reelection in 2020 as part of WV Can't Wait, which ran a slate of endorsed candidates across political parties, spearheaded by community organizer and Democratic gubernatorial candidate Stephen Smith.

In 2021, Thompson was named as an assistant minority whip by House Minority Leader Doug Skaff.

Later that year, he spoke out and voted against a bill that forces transgender students to play on sports teams according to the sex they are assigned at birth, as opposed to their gender identity. Thompson is also a supporter of the Fairness Act, which would add sexual orientation and gender identity as protected classes in West Virginia’s Human Rights Act and the Fair Housing Act.

During a special legislative session in October 2021, Thompson criticized the Republican majority for allegedly gerrymandering him out of the new House map. However, he was one of just three Democrats to vote for the final redistricting map.

As of 2026, Thompson serves on the Elkins, West Virginia City Council.

== Personal ==
Thompson served as a teacher at Elkins High School in Randolph County, West Virginia.

Thompson is the second openly gay member of the West Virginia Legislature, after former Delegate Stephen Skinner. At the time of his election in 2018, Thompson was the only openly gay member of the Legislature.
