= Shawn Fluharty =

American politician from West Virginia

Minority Whip of the West Virginia House of Delegates
- Incumbent
- Assumed office January 13, 2021
- Leader: Doug Skaff; Sean Hornbuckle
- Preceded by: Mike Caputo

Member of the West Virginia House of Delegates
- Incumbent
- Assumed office December 1, 2014
- Preceded by: Ryan Ferns
- Constituency: 3rd district (2014–2022); 5th district (2022–present)

Personal details
- Born: Shawn Lucas Fluharty; January 5, 1984 (age 42) Wheeling, West Virginia, U.S.
- Party: Democratic

Shawn Lucas Fluharty (born January 5, 1984) is an American politician who has served in the West Virginia House of Delegates from the 5th district (3rd district prior to 2020 census redistricting), first elected in 2014.

== Biography ==
He graduated from the West Virginia University School of Journalism in 2006 and the West Virginia University College of Law in 2009.

== Political career ==
Fluharty is noted as serving as the Minority Chair for the Judiciary, Courts, and Legal Services Committees and has been the sponsor of a variety of legislation.

Most notably, Fluharty was a part of a bipartisan "Tech Caucus" including himself and delegate Moore Capito. He was quoted as saying, "Young people are more mobile now than any time in our nation's history...West Virginia offers a great place to raise a family, it's about time we join the 21st century and make sure West Virginia also becomes a great place for innovation and technological opportunities so that we can truly compete in today's economy."
