= List of members of the 85th West Virginia Legislature =

85th West Virginia Legislature
←	84th	86th	→

Overview
- Legislative body: West Virginia Legislature
- Term: December 1, 2020 – December 1, 2022
- Election: 2020
- Governor: Jim Justice (R)

House of Delegates
- Members: 100 delegates
- Speaker: Roger Hanshaw (R)
- Speaker pro tempore: Gary Howell (R)
- Majority leader: Amy Summers (R)
- Minority leader: Doug Skaff (D)
- Party control: Republican

Senate
- Members: 34 senators
- President: Craig Blair (R)
- President pro tempore: Donna Boley (R)
- Majority leader: Tom Takubo (R)
- Minority leader: Stephen Baldwin (D)
- Party control: Republican

Sessions
- 1st: January 13, 2021 – April 10, 2021
- 2nd: January 12, 2022 – March 12, 2022

Special sessions
- 1st: June 7, 2021
- 2nd: June 24, 2021
- 3rd: October 11, 2021 – October 20, 2021
- 4th: January 10, 2022 – January 11, 2022
- 5th: April 25, 2022
- 6th: July 25, 2022
- 7th: September 12, 2022

The 85th West Virginia Legislature was a meeting of the West Virginia Legislature whose membership consisted of those elected in the 2020 legislative elections. It lasted through two several month long regular sessions and seven special sessions in 2021 and 2022, ending with the 2022 legislative elections and the convening of the 86th Legislature. All members who served in this meeting of the Legislature are listed below.

== Party summary ==
=== House of Delegates ===
Affiliation (Elected)	Party (Shading indicates majority caucus)		Total
Affiliation (Elected)	Democratic	Republican	Total
85th Legislature Start	24	76	100
December 11, 2020	23	77 (Note: Jason Barrett (District 61) switched his party affiliation from Democratic to Republican.)	100
January 9, 2021	23	76 (Note: Derrick Evans (District 19) resigned after being federally charged for his participation in the January 6, 2021 attack on the U.S. Capitol.)	99
January 27, 2021	23	77 (Note: Josh Booth (District 19) appointed to fill the vacancy left by Derrick Evans.)	100
May 12, 2021	22	78 (Note: Mick Bates (District 30) switched his party affiliation from Democratic to Republican.)	100
July 30, 2021	22	77 (Note: Jeffrey Pack (District 28) resigned to become the Commissioner of the West Virginia Bureau for Social Services.)	99
August 19, 2021	22	78 (Note: Jordan Maynor (District 28) appointed to fill the vacancy left by Jeffrey Pack.)	100
November 5, 2021	22	77 (Note: Joshua Higginbotham (District 13) resigned after moving from his Putnam County residence to Kanawha County.)	99
November 24, 2021	22	78 (Note: Kathie Hess Crouse (District 13) appointed to fill the vacancy left by Joshua Higginbotham.)	100
December 13, 2021	22	77 (Note: Barry Bruce (District 42) resigned over health concerns.)	99
December 21, 2021	22	78 (Note: Michael Honaker (District 42) appointed to fill the vacancy left by Barry Bruce.)	100
June 1, 2022	22	77 (Note: Joe Jeffries (District 22) resigned to take a job out of state.)	99
June 14, 2022	22	78 (Note: Jarred Cannon (District 22) appointed to fill the vacancy left by Joe Jeffries.)	100
August 8, 2022	22	77 (Note: Larry Pack (District 35) resigned to join the Justice Administration as a senior advisor.)	99
August 19, 2022	22	78 (Note: Andrew Anderson (District 35) appointed to fill the vacancy left by Larry Pack.)	100
85th Legislature End	22	78	100
Latest voting share	22%	78%	

=== Senate ===
Affiliation (Elected)	Party (Shading indicates majority caucus)		Total
Affiliation (Elected)	Democratic	Republican	Total
85th Legislature Start	11	23	34
August 20, 2021	10 (Note: John Unger (District 16) resigned to become a Berkeley County magistrate.)	23	33
September 29, 2021	11 (Note: Hannah Geffert (District 16) appointed to fill the vacancy left by John Unger.)	23	34
October 5, 2021	10 (Note: William J. Ihlenfeld II (District 1) resigned to become a District Attorney for the Northern District of West Virginia.)	23	33
October 7, 2021	11 (Note: Owens Brown (District 1) appointed to fill the vacancy left by William Ihlenfeld.)	23	34
85th Legislature End	11	23	34
Latest voting share	32%	68%	

== House of Delegates ==
=== Party leadership ===
Position	Name	Party	District	County
Speaker of the House	Roger Hanshaw	Republican	33rd	Clay
Speaker pro tempore	Gary Howell	Republican	56th	Mineral
Majority Leader	Amy Summers	Republican	49th	Taylor
Minority Leader	Doug Skaff	Democratic	35th	Kanawha
Majority Whip	Marty Gearheart	Republican	27th	Mercer
Minority Whip	Shawn Fluharty	Democratic	3rd	Ohio

=== Vacancies ===
District	Vacated by	Reason for change	Successor	Date of appointment
19	Derrick Evans (R)	Resigned after having been federally charged for his involvement in the January 6, 2021 attack on the U.S. Capitol.	Josh Booth (R)	January 27, 2021
28	Jeffrey Pack (R)	Resigned after having been appointed Commissioner of the state Department of Health and Human Resources' Bureau for Social Services by Governor Jim Justice.	Jordan Maynor (R)	August 19, 2021
13	Joshua Higginbotham (R)	Resigned after moving from his Putnam County district to Kanawha County.	Kathie Hess Crouse (R)	November 24, 2021
42	Barry Bruce (R)	Resigned over health concerns.	Michael Honaker (R)	December 21, 2021
22	Joe Jeffries (R)	Resigned to take a job out of state.	Jarred Cannon (R)	June 14, 2022
35	Larry Pack (R)	Resigned to join the administration of Jim Justice as a senior advisor.	Andrew Anderson (R)	August 19, 2022

=== Members ===
Member left office during Legislature Member appointed to fill vacancy

District	Delegate	Party	Since	Residence	Counties represented
1	Pat McGeehan	Republican	2014	Chester	Brooke, Hancock
1	Mark Zatezalo	Republican	2020	Wierton	Brooke, Hancock
2	Phil Diserio	Democratic	2016	Follansbee	Brooke, Ohio
3	Shawn Fluharty	Democratic	2014	Wheeling	Ohio
3	Erikka Lynn Storch	Republican	2010	Wheeling	Ohio
4	Charlie Reynolds	Republican	2020	Moundsville	Marshall
4	Lisa Zukoff	Democratic	2018	Moundsville	Marshall
5	Dave Pethtel	Democratic	1998	Burton	Monongalia, Wetzel
6	David Kelly	Republican	2018	Sistersville	Doddridge, Pleasants, Tyler
7	Trenton Barnhart	Republican	2019	St. Marys	Pleasants, Ritchie
8	Bill Anderson	Republican	1992	Williamstown	Wood
9	Shannon Kimes	Republican	2020	Rockport	Wirt, Wood
10	Roger Conley	Republican	2020	Vienna	Wood
10	Vernon Criss	Republican	2016	Parkersburg	Wood
10	John R. Kelly	Republican	2014	Parkersburg	Wood
11	Riley Keaton	Republican	2020	Spencer	Jackson, Roane
12	Steve Westfall	Republican	2012	Ripley	Jackson
13	Joshua Higginbotham	Republican	2016	Poca	Jackson, Mason, Putnam
13	Kathie Hess Crouse	Republican	2021	Buffalo	Jackson, Mason, Putnam
13	Jonathan Pinson	Republican	2020	Point Pleasant	Jackson, Mason, Putnam
14	Johnnie Wamsley	Republican	2020	Point Pleasant	Mason, Putnam
15	Geoff Foster	Republican	2014	Winfield	Putnam
16	Sean Hornbuckle	Democratic	2014	Huntington	Cabell, Lincoln
16	Daniel Linville	Republican	2018	Milton	Cabell, Lincoln
16	John Mandt	Republican	2020	Huntington	Cabell, Lincoln
17	Chad Lovejoy	Democratic	2016	Huntington	Cabell, Wayne
17	Matthew Rohrbach	Republican	2014	Huntington	Cabell, Wayne
18	Evan Worrell	Republican	2018	Barboursville	Cabell
19	Derrick Evans	Republican	2020	Prichard	Wayne
19	Josh Booth	Republican	2021	Ceredo	Wayne
19	Ric Griffith	Democratic	2020	Kenova	Wayne
20	Nathan Brown	Democratic	2018	Williamson	Logan, Mingo
21	Mark Dean	Republican	2016	Gilbert	McDowell, Mingo, Wyoming
22	Joe Jeffries	Republican	2018	Culloden	Boone, Lincoln, Logan, Putnam
22	Jarred Cannon	Republican	2022	Hurricane	Boone, Lincoln, Logan, Putnam
22	Zack Maynard	Republican	2016	Harts	Boone, Lincoln, Logan, Putnam
23	Josh Holstein	Republican	2020	Ashford	Boone
24	Jordan Bridges	Republican	2020	Logan	Boone, Logan, Wyoming
24	Margitta Mazzocchi	Republican	2020	Chapmanville	Boone, Logan, Wyoming
25	Tony Paynter	Republican	2016	Hanover	McDowell, Mercer, Wyoming
26	Ed Evans	Democratic	2016	Welch	McDowell, Mercer
27	Joe Ellington	Republican	2010	Princeton	Mercer, Raleigh
27	Marty Gearheart	Republican	2020	Bluefield	Mercer, Raleigh
27	Doug Smith	Republican	2020	Princeton	Mercer, Raleigh
28	Roy Cooper	Republican	2012	Wayside	Monroe, Raleigh, Summers
28	Jeffrey Pack	Republican	2018	Cool Ridge	Monroe, Raleigh, Summers
28	Jordan Maynor	Republican	2021	Beaver	Monroe, Raleigh, Summers
29	Brandon Steele	Republican	2018	Beckley	Raleigh
30	Mick Bates	Democratic, then Republican	2014	Beckley	Raleigh
31	Chris Toney	Republican	2018	Beckley	Raleigh, Wyoming
32	Tom Fast	Republican	2014	Fayetteville	Clay, Fayette, Kanawha, Nicholas, Raleigh
32	Austin Haynes	Republican	2020	Oak Hill	Clay, Fayette, Kanawha, Nicholas, Raleigh
32	Kayla Kessinger	Republican	2014	Mt. Hope	Clay, Fayette, Kanawha, Nicholas, Raleigh
33	Roger Hanshaw	Republican	2014	Wallback	Calhoun, Clay, Gilmer
34	Brent Boggs	Democratic	1996	Gassaway	Braxton, Gilmer
35	Larry Pack	Republican	2020	Charleston	Kanawha
35	Andrew Anderson	Republican	2022	Charleston	Kanawha
35	Moore Capito	Republican	2016	Charleston	Kanawha
35	Doug Skaff	Democratic	2018	South Charleston	Kanawha
35	Kayla Young	Democratic	2020	South Charleston	Kanawha
36	Jim Barach	Democratic	2020	Charleston	Kanawha
36	Chris Pritt	Republican	2020	Charleston	Kanawha
36	Larry Rowe	Democratic	2014	Malden	Kanawha
37	Mike Pushkin	Democratic	2014	Charleston	Kanawha
38	Dianna Graves	Republican	2017	Cross Lanes	Kanawha, Putnam
39	Dana Ferrell	Republican	2020	Sissonville	Kanawha
40	Dean Jeffries	Republican	2018	Elkview	Kanawha
41	Heather Tully	Republican	2020	Summersville	Greenbrier, Nicholas
42	Barry Bruce	Republican	2020	Lewisburg	Greenbrier, Monroe, Summers
42	Michael Honaker	Republican	2021	Lewisburg	Greenbrier, Monroe, Summers
42	Todd Longanacre	Republican	2020	Caldwell	Greenbrier, Monroe, Summers
43	Ty Nestor	Republican	2020	Elkins	Pocahontas, Randolph
43	Cody Thompson	Democratic	2018	Elkins	Pocahontas, Randolph
44	Caleb Hanna	Republican	2018	Fenwick	Nicholas, Randolph, Upshur, Webster
45	Carl Martin	Republican	2018	Buckhannon	Upshur
46	Adam Burkhammer	Republican	2020	Horner	Lewis, Upshur
47	Chris Phillips	Republican	2018	Buckhannon	Barbour, Tucker
48	Danny Hamrick	Republican	2012	Lost Creek	Harrison, Taylor
48	Laura Kimble	Republican	2020	Bridgeport	Harrison, Taylor
48	Ben Queen	Republican	2016	Bridgeport	Harrison, Taylor
48	Clay Riley	Republican	2020	Shinnston	Harrison, Taylor
49	Amy Summers	Republican	2014	Flemington	Marion, Monongalia, Taylor
50	Joey Garcia	Democratic	2020	Fairmont	Marion
50	Phil Mallow	Republican	2020	Fairmont	Marion
50	Guy Ward	Republican	2020	White Hall	Marion
51	Barbara Fleischauer	Democratic	2006	Morgantown	Monongalia
51	Evan Hansen	Democratic	2018	Morgantown	Monongalia
51	Joe Statler	Republican	2020	Core	Monongalia
51	Danielle Walker	Democratic	2018	Morgantown	Monongalia
51	John Williams	Democratic	2016	Morgantown	Monongalia
52	Terri Funk Sypolt	Republican	2016	Kingwood	Preston
53	D. Rolland Jennings	Republican	2017	Thornton	Preston, Tucker
54	John Paul Hott	Republican	2018	Petersburg	Grant, Mineral, Pendleton
55	Bryan Ward	Republican	2020	Fisher	Hardy, Pendleton
56	Gary Howell	Republican	2010	Keyser	Mineral
57	Ruth Rowan	Republican	2004	Points	Hampshire, Mineral
58	George A. Miller	Republican	2020	Berkeley Springs	Hampshire, Morgan
59	Ken Reed	Republican	2020	Hedgesville	Berkeley, Morgan
60	Don Forsht	Republican	2020	Gerrardstown	Berkeley
61	Jason Barrett	Democratic, then Republican	2016	Martinsburg	Berkeley
62	Chuck Horst	Republican	2020	Falling Waters	Berkeley
63	John Hardy	Republican	2018	Shepherdstown	Berkeley
64	Eric Householder	Republican	2010	Martinsburg	Berkeley
65	Wayne Clark	Republican	2020	Charles Town	Jefferson
66	Paul Espinosa	Republican	2012	Charles Town	Jefferson
67	John Doyle	Democratic	2018	Shepherdstown	Jefferson

== Senate ==
=== Party leadership ===
Position	Name	Party	District	County
Senate President/Lieutenant Governor	Craig Blair	Republican	15th	Berkeley
President pro tempore	Donna Boley	Republican	3rd	Pleasants
Majority Leader	Tom Takubo	Republican	17th	Kanawha
Minority Leader	Stephen Baldwin	Democratic	10th	Greenbrier
Majority Whip	Ryan Weld	Republican	1st	Brooke
Minority Whip	Mike Woelfel	Democratic	5th	Cabell

=== Vacancies ===
District	Vacated by	Reason for change	Successor	Date of appointment
1	William J. Ihlenfeld II (D)	Resigned after being appointed as United States Attorney for the Northern District of West Virginia by President Joe Biden.	Owens Brown (D)	October 7, 2021
16	John Unger (D)	Resigned after having been elected as a Berkeley County magistrate.	Hannah Geffert (D)	September 29, 2021

=== Members ===
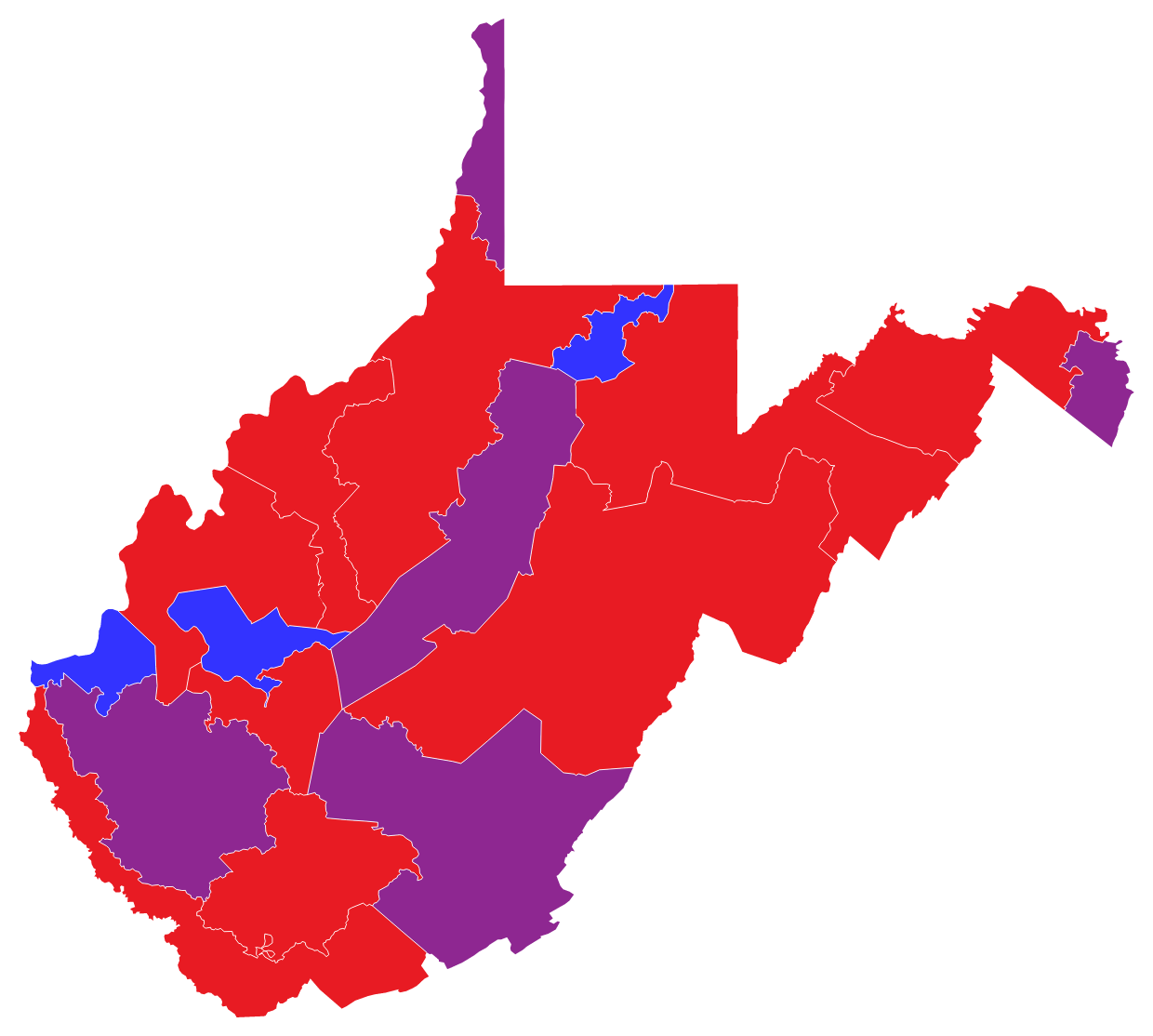
85th West Virginia Senate partisan composition by district

Member left office during Legislature Member appointed to fill vacancy

District	Senator	Party	Since	Residence	Counties represented
1	William Ihlenfeld	Democratic	2018	Wheeling	Brooke, Hancock, Ohio, Marshall
1	Owens Brown	Democratic	2021	Wheeling	Brooke, Hancock, Ohio, Marshall
1	Ryan Weld	Republican	2016	Wellsburg	Brooke, Hancock, Ohio, Marshall
2	Charles H. Clements	Republican	2016	New Martinsville	Calhoun, Doddridge, Gilmer, Marion, Marshall, Monongalia, Ritchie, Tyler, Wetzel
2	Mike Maroney	Republican	2016	Glen Dale	Calhoun, Doddridge, Gilmer, Marion, Marshall, Monongalia, Ritchie, Tyler, Wetzel
3	Mike Azinger	Republican	2016	Vienna	Pleasants, Roane, Wirt, Wood
3	Donna Boley	Republican	1985	St. Marys	Pleasants, Roane, Wirt, Wood
4	Amy Grady	Republican	2020	Leon	Jackson, Mason, Putnam, Roane
4	Eric Tarr	Republican	2018	Scott Depot	Jackson, Mason, Putnam, Roane
5	Robert H. Plymale	Democratic	1992	Huntington	Cabell, Wayne
5	Mike Woelfel	Democratic	2014	Huntington	Cabell, Wayne
6	Mark R. Maynard	Republican	2014	Genoa	McDowell, Mercer, Mingo, Wayne
6	Chandler Swope	Republican	2016	Bluefield	McDowell, Mercer, Mingo, Wayne
7	Rupie Phillips	Republican	2020	Lorado	Boone, Lincoln, Logan, Mingo, Wayne
7	Ron Stollings	Democratic	2006	Madison	Boone, Lincoln, Logan, Mingo, Wayne
8	Glenn Jeffries	Democratic	2016	Red House	Kanawha, Putnam
8	Richard Lindsay	Democratic	2018	Charleston	Kanawha, Putnam
9	Rollan Roberts	Republican	2018	Beaver	McDowell, Raleigh, Wyoming
9	David Stover	Republican	2020	Maben	McDowell, Raleigh, Wyoming
10	Stephen Baldwin	Democratic	2017	Ronceverte	Fayette, Greenbrier, Monroe, Summers
10	Jack Woodrum	Republican	2020	Hinton	Fayette, Greenbrier, Monroe, Summers
11	Bill Hamilton	Republican	2018	Buckhannon	Grant, Nicholas, Pendleton, Pocahontas, Randolph, Upshur, Webster
11	Robert L. Karnes	Republican	2020	Helvetia	Grant, Nicholas, Pendleton, Pocahontas, Randolph, Upshur, Webster
12	Patrick S. Martin	Republican	2020	Jane Lew	Braxton, Clay, Gilmer, Harrison, Lewis
12	Mike Romano	Democratic	2014	Bridgeport	Braxton, Clay, Gilmer, Harrison, Lewis
13	Bob Beach	Democratic	2010	Morgantown	Marion, Monongalia
13	Mike Caputo	Democratic	2020	Rivesville	Marion, Monongalia
14	Randy Smith	Republican	2016	Thomas	Barbour, Grant, Hardy, Mineral, Monongalia, Preston, Taylor, Tucker
14	David Sypolt	Republican	2006	Kingwood	Barbour, Grant, Hardy, Mineral, Monongalia, Preston, Taylor, Tucker
15	Craig Blair	Republican	2012	Martinsburg	Berkeley, Hampshire, Mineral, Morgan
15	Charles S. Trump	Republican	2014	Berkeley Springs	Berkeley, Hampshire, Mineral, Morgan
16	John Unger	Democratic	1998	Martinsburg	Berkeley, Jefferson
16	Hannah Geffert	Democratic	2021	Martinsburg	Berkeley, Jefferson
16	Patricia Rucker	Republican	2016	Harpers Ferry	Berkeley, Jefferson
17	Eric Nelson	Republican	2020	Charleston	Kanawha
17	Tom Takubo	Republican	2014	Charleston	Kanawha

== See also ==
- List of West Virginia state legislatures
