= 2022 West Virginia Senate election =

2022 West Virginia Senate elections
- November 8, 2022

17 of 34 seats in the West Virginia Senate 18 seats needed for a majority
	Majority party	Minority party
	GOP	DEM
Leader	Craig Blair	Stephen Baldwin (lost re-election)
Party	Republican	Democratic
Leader since	January 13, 2021	January 13, 2021
Leader's seat	15th district	10th district
Seats before	23	11
Seats after	30	4
Seat change	▲7	▼7
Popular vote	307,201	131,305
Percentage	67.0%	28.6%
Swing	▲5.8%	▼7.5%
Seats up	9	8
Races won	16	1
- Republican gain Republican hold Democratic hold 50–60% 60–70% 70–80% 80–90% >90% 50–60%
Senate President before election
Craig Blair
Republican
Elected Senate President
Craig Blair
Republican

The 2022 West Virginia Senate elections were held on November 8, 2022, and elected 17 of the chamber's 34 members. This coincided with elections in the House of Delegates, and the election of West Virginia's two representatives. Following the 2020 census, this was the first West Virginia Senate election held after redistricting. Primary elections were held on May 10, 2022.

The Republican party won 16 of the 17 races up for election, attaining supermajority status in the State Senate with 30 seats. A month after the election, state senator Glenn Jeffries (who was not up for re-election in 2022) switch from the Democratic to Republican party, further increasing the party's seat count.

== Retirements ==
Three members of the West Virginia Senate - two Democrats, and one Republican - did not run for re-election.

=== Democrats ===
1. District 12: Mike Romano retired to run for Harrison County Commission.
2. District 13: Bob Beach retired.

=== Republicans ===
1. District 14: David Sypolt retired.

== Incumbents defeated ==
=== In primaries ===
==== Democrats ====
1. District 1: Owens Brown lost renomination to former delegate Randy Swartzmiller.

=== In general elections ===
==== Democrats ====
1. District 7: Ron Stollings lost re-election to Mike Stuart.
2. District 8: Richard Lindsay lost re-election to Mark Hunt.
3. District 10: Stephen Baldwin lost re-election to Vince Deeds.
4. District 16: Hannah Geffert lost re-election to Jason Barrett.

== Seats for election ==
In the West Virginia Senate, two members are elected from each of the 17 districts in staggered, four-year terms. In the 2022 cycle, nine Republican-held seats and eight Democrat-held seats were open for election. The names of members whose seats were up for election and their winning candidates are below.

District	Incumbent			Elected Senator		Result
District	Member	Party	First elected	Member	Party	Result
District 1	Owens Brown	Democratic	2021 (appointed)	Laura Chapman	Republican	Republican gain
District 2	Charles Clements	Republican	2017 (appointed)	Charles Clements	Republican	Republican hold
District 3	Mike Azinger	Republican	2016	Mike Azinger	Republican	Republican hold
District 4	Eric Tarr	Republican	2018	Eric Tarr	Republican	Republican hold
District 5	Mike Woelfel	Democratic	2014	Mike Woelfel	Democratic	Democratic hold
District 6	Mark Maynard	Republican	2014	Mark Maynard	Republican	Republican hold
District 7	Ron Stollings	Democratic	2006	Mike Stuart	Republican	Republican gain
District 8	Richard Lindsay	Democratic	2018	Mark Hunt	Republican	Republican gain
District 9	Rollan Roberts	Republican	2018	Rollan Roberts	Republican	Republican hold
District 10	Stephen Baldwin	Democratic	2017 (appointed)	Vince Deeds	Republican	Republican gain
District 11	Bill Hamilton	Republican	2018	Bill Hamilton	Republican	Republican hold
District 12	Mike Romano	Democratic	2014	Ben Queen	Republican	Republican gain
District 13	Bob Beach	Democratic	2010	Mike Oliverio	Republican	Republican gain
District 14	David Sypolt	Republican	2006	Jay Taylor	Republican	Republican hold
District 15	Charles Trump	Republican	2014	Charles Trump	Republican	Republican hold
District 16	Hannah Geffert	Democratic	2021 (appointed)	Jason Barrett	Republican	Republican gain
District 17	Tom Takubo	Republican	2014	Tom Takubo	Republican	Republican hold

== Predictions ==
Source	Ranking	As of
Sabato's Crystal Ball	Safe R	May 19, 2022

== Senate President Election ==
The 2023 West Virginia Senate Presidential election was held on January 11, 2023.

On August 31, 2022, Republican senator and former chair of the Senate Education Committee Patricia Rucker announced that she would challenge incumbent president Craig Blair in the election. On November 22, Rucker withdrew her bid.

On December 4, 2022, Blair was renominated as President of the Senate, unopposed.

At the convening of the 86th Legislature on January 11, 2023, Blair was re-elected by acclamation.

== Overview ==
In 2022, the Democrats, though defending fewer seats than the Republicans, had the majority of their caucus up for re-election, leaving them vulnerable to Republicans. Of the eight seats held by Democrats going into the election, all but one elected Republicans.

↓
30	4
Republican	Dem.

2022 West Virginia Senate election
Party	Races contested	Races won	Votes	Percentage	% change	Seats before	Seats after	+/–
Republican	17	16	307,201	67.01%	▲5.8%	23	30	▲7
Democratic	12	1	131,305	28.64%	▼7.5%	11	4	▼7
Libertarian	2	0	13,723	2.99%	▲2.3%	0	0	Steady
Upwising WV	1	0	5,148	1.12%	▲1.1%	0	0	Steady
Independent	1	0	1,085	0.24%	▲0.2%	0	0	Steady
Totals		17	458,462	100.00%	—	34	34	—
Turnout				39.76%	▼23.5%	34	34	—

Popular vote
Republican	67.01%
Democratic	28.64%
Libertarian	2.99%
Up. WV	1.12%

Senate seats
Republican	88.24%
Democratic	11.76%

== Appointments ==
During West Virginia's 85th Legislature (2021–2022), two senators resigned from their positions. According to §3-10-5 of West Virginia Code, vacancies in the Senate are filled through appointment by the Governor of one of three candidates chosen by the executive committee of the outgoing member's party. Below is a list of appointments made during the 85th Legislature.

District	Incumbent		Party	Appointee		Ref.
District	Departing member	First elected	Party	Incoming member	Appt. date	Ref.
16	John Unger	2020	Dem	Hannah Geffert	September 29, 2021	
1	William Ihlenfeld	2018	Dem	Owens Brown	October 7, 2021	

== Close races ==
District	Winner	Margin
District 13	Republican (flip)	0.5%
District 5	Democratic	7.9%
District 8	Republican (flip)	13.5%

== List of districts ==
=== District 1 ===
Incumbent Owens Brown was appointed in 2021.

Republican primary results
Party	Candidate	Votes	%
Republican	Laura Chapman	6,136	68.7
Republican	Judi Meyer	2,792	31.3
Total votes		8,928	100.0

Democratic primary results
Party	Candidate	Votes	%
Democratic	Randy Swartzmiller	3,554	53.4
Democratic	Owens Brown (incumbent)	3,097	46.6
Total votes		6,651	100.0

==== General election ====
West Virginia's 1st Senate district, 2022
Party	Candidate	Votes	%
Republican	Laura Chapman	18,746	60.5
Democratic	Randy Swartzmiller	12,258	39.5
Total votes		31,004	100.0
Republican gain from Democratic			

=== District 2 ===
Incumbent Charles Clements was first elected in 2016.

Republican primary results
Party	Candidate	Votes	%
Republican	Charles Clements (incumbent)	6,834	100.0
Total votes		6,834	100.0

Democratic primary results
Party	Candidate	Votes	%
Democratic	Eric Hayhurst	4,765	100.0
Total votes		4,765	100.0

==== General election ====
West Virginia's 2nd Senate district, 2022
Party	Candidate	Votes	%
Republican	Charles Clements (incumbent)	18,720	62.5
Democratic	Eric Hayhurst	11,213	37.5
Total votes		29,933	100.0
Republican hold			

=== District 3 ===
Incumbent Michael Azinger was first elected in 2016.

Republican primary results
Party	Candidate	Votes	%
Republican	Michael Azinger (incumbent)	6,625	51.5
Republican	John Kelly	6,230	48.5
Total votes		12,855	100.0

Democratic primary results
Party	Candidate	Votes	%
Democratic	Jody Murphy	4,077	100.0
Total votes		4,077	100.0

==== General election ====
West Virginia's 3rd Senate district, 2022
Party	Candidate	Votes	%
Republican	Michael Azinger (incumbent)	20,812	65.7
Democratic	Jody Murphy	10,861	34.3
Total votes		31,673	100.0
Republican hold			

=== District 4 ===
Incumbent Eric Tarr was first elected in 2018.

Republican primary results
Party	Candidate	Votes	%
Republican	Eric Tarr (incumbent)	7,562	100.0
Total votes		7,562	100.0

==== General election ====
West Virginia's 4th Senate district, 2022
Party	Candidate	Votes	%
Republican	Eric Tarr (incumbent)	21,059	100.0
Total votes		21,059	100.0
Republican hold			

=== District 5 ===
Incumbent Mike Woelfel was first elected in 2014.

Republican primary results
Party	Candidate	Votes	%
Republican	Melissa Clark	3,916	100.0
Total votes		3,916	100.0

Democratic primary results
Party	Candidate	Votes	%
Democratic	Mike Woelfel (incumbent)	5,063	100.0
Total votes		5,063	100.0

==== General election ====
West Virginia's 5th Senate district, 2022
Party	Candidate	Votes	%
Democratic	Mike Woelfel (incumbent)	13,542	54.0
Republican	Melissa Clark	11,552	46.0
Total votes		25,094	100.0
Democratic hold			

=== District 6 ===
Incumbent Mark Maynard was first elected in 2014.

Republican primary results
Party	Candidate	Votes	%
Republican	Mark Maynard (incumbent)	3,435	59.3
Republican	Sabrina Grace	1,557	26.9
Republican	Wesley Blankenship	801	13.8
Total votes		5,793	100.0

Democratic primary results
Party	Candidate	Votes	%
Democratic	Tiffany Clemins	2,339	100.0
Total votes		2,339	100.0

==== General election ====
West Virginia's 6th Senate district, 2022
Party	Candidate	Votes	%
Republican	Mark Maynard (incumbent)	17,222	73.4
Democratic	Tiffany Clemins	6,249	26.6
Total votes		23,471	100.0
Republican hold			

=== District 7 ===
Incumbent Ron Stollings was first elected in 2006.

Republican primary results
Party	Candidate	Votes	%
Republican	Mike Stuart	2,487	52.2
Republican	Chad McCormick	2,278	47.8
Total votes		4,765	100.0

Democratic primary results
Party	Candidate	Votes	%
Democratic	Ron Stollings (incumbent)	4,962	100.0
Total votes		4,962	100.0

==== General election ====
West Virginia's 7th Senate district, 2022
Party	Candidate	Votes	%
Republican	Mike Stuart	13,242	58.2
Democratic	Ron Stollings (incumbent)	9,526	41.8
Total votes		22,768	100.0
Republican gain from Democratic			

=== District 8 ===
Incumbent Richard Lindsay was first elected in 2018.

Republican primary results
Party	Candidate	Votes	%
Republican	Mark Hunt	2,427	46.4
Republican	Joshua Higginbotham	1,786	34.2
Republican	Mark Mitchem	1,016	19.4
Total votes		5,229	100.0

Democratic primary results
Party	Candidate	Votes	%
Democratic	Richard Lindsay (incumbent)	5,100	100.0
Total votes		5,100	100.0

==== General election ====
West Virginia's 8th Senate district, 2022
Party	Candidate	Votes	%
Republican	Mark Hunt	14,615	56.8
Democratic	Richard Lindsay (incumbent)	11,136	43.2
Total votes		25,751	100.0
Republican gain from Democratic			

=== District 9 ===
Incumbent Rollan Roberts was first elected in 2018.

Republican primary results
Party	Candidate	Votes	%
Republican	Rollan Roberts (incumbent)	4,597	51.7
Republican	Mick Bates	4,294	48.3
Total votes		8,891	100.0

==== General election ====
West Virginia's 9th Senate district, 2022
Party	Candidate	Votes	%
Republican	Rollan Roberts (incumbent)	18,540	78.1
Libertarian	Kari Woodson	5,194	21.9
Total votes		23,734	100.0
Republican hold			

=== District 10 ===
Incumbent Stephen Baldwin was appointed in 2017.

Republican primary results
Party	Candidate	Votes	%
Republican	Vince Deeds	4,964	48.9
Republican	Mike Steadham	4,265	42.0
Republican	Thomas Perkins	931	9.1
Total votes		10,160	100.0

Democratic primary results
Party	Candidate	Votes	%
Democratic	Stephen Baldwin (incumbent)	6,210	100.0
Total votes		6,210	100.0

==== General election ====
West Virginia's 10th Senate district, 2022
Party	Candidate	Votes	%
Republican	Vince Deeds	18,954	58.7
Democratic	Stephen Baldwin (incumbent)	12,250	37.9
Independent	Aaron Ransom	1,085	3.4
Total votes		32,289	100.0
Republican gain from Democratic			

=== District 11 ===
Incumbent Bill Hamilton was first elected in 2018.

Republican primary results
Party	Candidate	Votes	%
Republican	Bill Hamilton (incumbent)	7,091	100.0
Total votes		7,091	100.0

==== General election ====
West Virginia's 11th Senate district, 2022
Party	Candidate	Votes	%
Republican	Bill Hamilton (incumbent)	23,105	100.0
Total votes		23,105	100.0
Republican hold			

=== District 12 ===
Incumbent Mike Romano was first elected in 2014. He retired, leaving an open seat.

Republican primary results
Party	Candidate	Votes	%
Republican	Ben Queen	6,723	100.0
Total votes		6,723	100.0

==== General election ====
West Virginia's 12th Senate district, 2022
Party	Candidate	Votes	%
Republican	Ben Queen	18,711	68.7
Libertarian	Austin Lynch	8,529	31.3
Write-in		8	0.0
Total votes		27,248	100.0
Republican hold			

=== District 13 ===
Incumbent Bob Beach was first elected in 2010. He retired, leaving an open seat.

Republican primary results
Party	Candidate	Votes	%
Republican	Mike Oliverio	4,528	80.4
Republican	Carly Braun	1,102	19.6
Total votes		5,630	100.0

Democratic primary results
Party	Candidate	Votes	%
Democratic	Barbara Fleischauer	5,366	82.5
Democratic	Rich Jacobs	1,140	17.5
Total votes		6,506	100.0

==== General election ====
West Virginia's 13th Senate district, 2022
Party	Candidate	Votes	%
Republican	Mike Oliverio	13,495	50.3
Democratic	Barbara Fleischauer	13,342	49.7
Total votes		26,837	100.0
Republican gain from Democratic			

=== District 14 ===
Incumbent David Sypolt was first elected in 2006. He retired, leaving an open seat.

Republican primary results
Party	Candidate	Votes	%
Republican	Jay Taylor	4,315	35.7
Republican	J.R. Keplinger	2,229	18.4
Republican	Angela Iman	2,217	18.3
Republican	James Lough	1,831	15.1
Republican	Stephen Smith	1,519	12.5
Total votes		12,111	100.0

Democratic primary results
Party	Candidate	Votes	%
Democratic	Amanda Pitzer	3,226	100.0
Total votes		3,226	100.0

==== General election ====
West Virginia's 14th Senate district, 2022
Party	Candidate	Votes	%
Republican	Jay Taylor	21,910	76.2
Democratic	Amanda Pitzer	6,855	23.8
Total votes		28,765	100.0
Republican hold			

=== District 15 ===
Incumbent Charles Trump was first elected in 2014.

Republican primary results
Party	Candidate	Votes	%
Republican	Charles Trump (incumbent)	7,564	100.0
Total votes		7,564	100.0

West Virginia's 15th Senate district, 2022
Party	Candidate	Votes	%
Republican	Charles Trump (incumbent)	21,137	80.4
Upwising WV	Robin Mills	5,148	19.6
Total votes		26,285	100.0
Republican hold			

=== District 16 ===
Incumbent Hannah Geffert was appointed in 2021. She initially did not file for re-election, but changed her mind and entered the race.

Republican primary results
Party	Candidate	Votes	%
Republican	Jason Barrett	4,488	54.7
Republican	Renee Wibly	3,715	45.3
Total votes		8,203	100.0

==== General election ====
West Virginia's 16th Senate district, 2022
Party	Candidate	Votes	%
Republican	Jason Barrett	18,672	60.5
Democratic	Hannah Geffert (incumbent)	12,196	39.5
Total votes		30,868	100.0
Republican gain from Democratic			

=== District 17 ===
Incumbent Tom Takubo was first elected in 2014.

Republican primary results
Party	Candidate	Votes	%
Republican	Tom Takubo (incumbent)	4,263	71.1
Republican	Terry Burns	1,732	28.9
Total votes		5,995	100.0

Democratic primary results
Party	Candidate	Votes	%
Democratic	Samuel Wood	4,663	100.0
Total votes		4,663	100.0

==== General election ====
West Virginia's 17th Senate district, 2022
Party	Candidate	Votes	%
Republican	Tom Takubo (incumbent)	16,739	58.5
Democratic	Samuel Wood	11,897	41.5
Total votes		28,636	100.0
Republican hold			
