= West Virginia's 1st House of Delegates district =

West Virginia's 1st House of Delegates district is one of 100 seats in the West Virginia's House of Delegates. It is represented by Republican Pat McGeehan, who has held the seat since 2014.

== Geography ==
District 1 spans the northernmost part of the Northern Panhandle including most of Hancock County along with the cities of Chester and New Cumberland. The district also spans part of Brooke County along with the city of Weirton, and Colliers. The district is located entirely within West Virginia's 2nd congressional district.

== Recent election results ==
=== 2022 ===
==== Primary elections ====
Republican primary results
Party	Candidate	Votes	%
Republican	Pat McGeehan (incumbent)	2,022	100.0
Total votes		2,022	100.0

Democratic primary results
Party	Candidate	Votes	%
Democratic	Jack Wood	1,056	100.0
Total votes		1,056	100.0

==== General election ====
West Virginia's 1st House of Delegates district, 2022
Party	Candidate	Votes	%
Republican	Pat McGeehan (incumbent)	4,590	75.8
Democratic	Jack Wood	1,462	24.2
Total votes		6,052	100.0
Republican win (new boundaries)			

== 2020 ==
Prior to the 2020 redistricting cycle, the House of Delegates used multi-member districts.

West Virginia's 1st House district General Election, 2020
Party	Candidate	Votes	%
Republican	Mark Zatezalo	8,978	35.25
Republican	Pat McGeehan (incumbent)	8,165	32.06
Democratic	Jack Wood	4,307	16.91
Democratic	Ronnie Jones	4,016	15.77
Total votes		25,466	100.0
Republican gain from Democratic			
Republican hold			

== 2018 ==
West Virginia's 1st House district general election, 2018
Party	Candidate	Votes	%
Republican	Pat McGeehan (incumbent)	6,540	30.51
Democratic	Randy Swartzmiller	5,277	24.62
Republican	Mark Zatezalo (incumbent)	5,154	24.05
Democratic	Diana Magnone	4,463	20.82
Total votes		21,434	100.0
Republican hold			
Democratic gain from Republican			

== 2016 ==
West Virginia's 1st House district general election, 2016
Party	Candidate	Votes	%
Republican	Pat McGeehan (incumbent)	8,425	40.08
Republican	Mark Zatezalo (incumbent)	7,030	33.44
Democratic	Ronnie Jones	5,565	26.47
Total votes		21,020	100.0
Republican hold			
Republican hold			

== 2014 ==
West Virginia's 1st House district general election, 2014
Party	Candidate	Votes	%
Republican	Mark Zatezalo	5,075	30.33
Republican	Pat McGeehan	4,548	27.18
Democratic	Randy Swartzmiller (incumbent)	4,198	25.09
Democratic	Ronnie Jones (incumbent)	2,911	17.40
Total votes		16,732	100.0
Republican gain from Democratic			
Republican gain from Democratic			

== 2012 ==
West Virginia's 1st House district general election, 2012
Party	Candidate	Votes	%
Democratic	Randy Swartzmiller (incumbent)	9,059	36.27
Democratic	Ronnie Jones (incumbent)	7,128	28.54
Republican	Carl Thompson	5,134	20.56
Republican	Justin Bull	3,655	14.63
Total votes		24,976	100.0
Democratic hold			
Democratic hold			
