= Jeff Campbell (West Virginia politician) =

American Republican Party politician

Member of the West Virginia House of Delegates
- Incumbent
- Assumed office September 13, 2023
- Preceded by: Michael Honaker
- Constituency: 46th district
- In office October 30, 2017 – December 1, 2020
- Preceded by: Stephen Baldwin
- Succeeded by: Barry Bruce; Todd Longanacre
- Constituency: 42nd district

Personal details
- Born: Jeffrey Scott Campbell; February 8, 1969 (age 57) Hinton, West Virginia, U.S.
- Party: Republican (2021–present)
- Other political affiliations: Democratic (until 2021)
- Education: Concord University (BA, BS)

Jeff Campbell (born February 8, 1969) is an American politician serving as a member of the West Virginia House of Delegates from the 46th district. He was appointed by governor Jim Justice to fill a vacancy left behind by Michael Honaker. Campbell previously served in the House of Delegates from 2017 to 2020 from the 42nd district, to which he was also appointed by Justice as a Democrat. Campbell is a schoolteacher and broadcaster, having been the statistician on West Virginia Mountaineers football broadcasts for many years.

== Electoral history ==
=== 2020 ===
West Virginia's 42nd House district Democratic Primary, 2020
Party	Candidate	Votes	%
Democratic	Jeff Campbell (incumbent)	3,878	50.9
Democratic	Cindy Lavender-Bowe (incumbent)	3,738	49.1
Total votes		7,616	100.0

West Virginia's 42nd House district General Election, 2020 Elect Two
Party	Candidate	Votes	%
Republican	Barry Bruce	8,236	29.5
Republican	Todd Longanacre	7,450	26.6
Democratic	Jeff Campbell (incumbent)	6,533	23.4
Democratic	Cindy Lavender-Bowe (incumbent)	5,732	20.5
Total votes		27,951	100.0
Republican gain from Democratic			
Republican gain from Democratic			

=== 2018 ===
West Virginia's 42nd House district Democratic Primary, 2018
Party	Candidate	Votes	%
Democratic	Jeff Campbell (incumbent)	3,014	44.1
Democratic	Cindy Lavender-Bowe (incumbent)	2,516	36.8
Democratic	Isaiah T. Stanley	736	10.8
Democratic	Roger Vannoy	563	8.2
Total votes		6,829	100.0

West Virginia's 42nd House district General Election, 2018 Elect Two
Party	Candidate	Votes	%
Democratic	Jeff Campbell (incumbent)	6,404	28.8
Democratic	Cindy Lavender-Bowe	5,767	25.9
Republican	Denny R. Canterbury	5,582	25.1
Republican	Steve Malcomb	4,514	20.3
Total votes		22,267	100.0
Democratic hold			
Democratic gain from Republican			
