= Craig Blair =

American politician (born 1959)

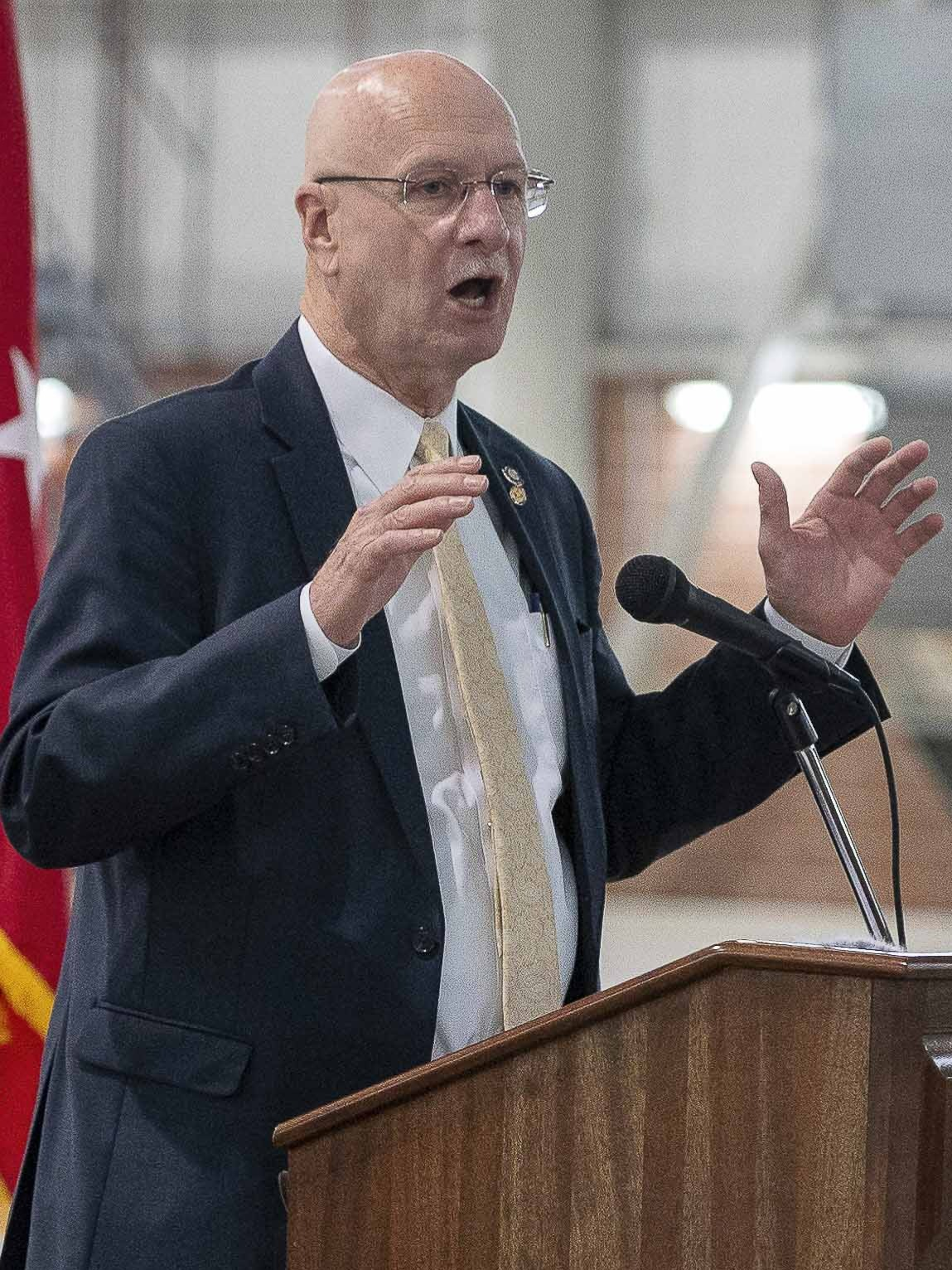

President of the West Virginia Senate Lieutenant Governor of West Virginia
- In office January 13, 2021 – January 8, 2025
- Governor: Jim Justice
- Preceded by: Mitch Carmichael
- Succeeded by: Randy Smith

Member of the West Virginia Senate from the 15th district
- In office December 1, 2012 – December 1, 2024 Serving with Charles S. Trump
- Preceded by: Clark Barnes
- Succeeded by: Tom Willis

Member of the West Virginia House of Delegates from the 52nd district
- In office December 1, 2002 – December 1, 2010
- Preceded by: Vicki Douglas
- Succeeded by: Larry Kump

Personal details
- Born: October 17, 1959 (age 67) Martinsburg, West Virginia, U.S.
- Party: Republican
- Spouse: Andrea
- Children: 2, including Saira
- Education: James Rumsey Technical Institute
- Website: Campaign website

Craig Philip Blair (born October 17, 1959) is an American politician and a former Republican member of the West Virginia Senate representing District 15 from 2012 to 2024. Previously, Blair served in the West Virginia Legislature from January 2003 until January 2011 in the West Virginia House of Delegates in the District 52 seat. Blair is also the father of former WV Delegate Saira Blair.

As president of the state senate, Blair concurrently held the title lieutenant governor of West Virginia from January 2021 to January 2025.

Blair lost renomination in 2024.

== Elections ==
2024 Republican Primary

Republican Tom Willis defeated Blair in the West Virginia Republican primary on Tuesday, May 14, 2024.

2023 (president)

In the months leading up to the 2022 senate elections, senator Patricia Rucker challenged Blair for the caucus' nomination. After the elections, however, Rucker withdrew her bid, and Blair was re-elected by acclamation. He was once again nominated by Charles Trump, and nominations were closed by minority leader Mike Woelfel.

=== 2021 (president) ===
Blair was elected as President of the Senate by acclamation, being nominated by Charles Trump. Further nominations were closed minority leader Stephen Baldwin, leaving Blair uncontested. He replaced Mitch Carmichael, who lost renomination in the previous year's elections.

=== 2020 ===
Blair narrowly defeated challenger Kenneth Mattson, a former military police officer and small business owner, in the Republican primary, and beat Mountain Party challenger Donald Kinnie in the general election.

West Virginia Senate District 15 (Position B) election, 2020
Party	Candidate	Votes	%
Republican	Craig Blair (incumbent)	41,560	80.10%
Mountain	Donald Kinnie	10,324	19.90%
Total votes		51,884	100.0%

- West Virginia Senate District 15 Republican primary, 2020
  Primary election
  Party	Candidate	Votes	%
  Republican	Craig Blair (incumbent)	7,837	52.7%
  Republican	Kenneth Mattson	7,033	47.3%
  Total votes		14,870	100.0%

=== 2016 ===
Blair easily defeated challenger Larry Kump in the Republican primary and Democratic challenger Brad Noll in the general election.

West Virginia Senate District 15 (Position B) election, 2016
Party	Candidate	Votes	%
Republican	Craig Blair (incumbent)	32,475	70.44%
Democratic	Brad Noll	13,629	29.56%
Total votes		46,104	100.0%

- West Virginia Senate District 15 Republican primary, 2016
  Primary election
  Party	Candidate	Votes	%
  Republican	Craig Blair (incumbent)	9,702	67.82%
  Republican	Larry Kump	4,604	32.18%
  Total votes		14,306	100.0%

=== 2012 ===
After his unsuccessful run in 2010, Blair was redistricted to District 15, and with incumbent Senator Clark Barnes redistricted to District 11, Blair was unopposed for the May 8, 2012 Republican Primary. He went on to win the November 6, 2012 General election with 28,766 votes (80.8%) against Constitution Party candidate Daniel Litten.

West Virginia Senate District 15 (Position B) election, 2012
Party	Candidate	Votes	%
Republican	Craig Blair	28,766	80.77%
Constitution	Daniel Litten	6,847	19.23%
Total votes		35,613	100.0%

=== 2010 ===
Rather than run for re-election to the House of Delegates, Blair challenged Senate District 16 incumbent Democratic Senator John Unger. Blair was unopposed for the May 11, 2010 Republican Primary, but lost the November 2, 2010 General election to Senator Unger by 318 votes (less than 1%).

West Virginia Senate District 16 election, 2010
Party	Candidate	Votes	%
Democratic	John Unger (incumbent)	18,800	50.43%
Republican	Craig Blair	18,482	49.57%
Total votes		37,282	100.0%

=== 2008 ===
Blair was unopposed for the 2008 Republican Primary, and won the November 4, 2008 General election with 4,994 votes (54.8%) against Democratic nominee Mike Roberts.

=== 2006 ===
Blair was unopposed for both the 2006 Republican Primary and the November 7, 2006 General election.

=== 2004 ===
Blair was unopposed for the 2004 Republican Primary, and won the November 2, 2004 General election with 5,193 votes (62.5%) against Democratic nominee Scott Funk.

=== 2002 ===
When House District 52 Democratic Delegate Vicki Douglas retired from the Legislature and left the seat open, Blair won the 2002 Republican Primary with 624 votes (55.2%) against Jerry Mays and won the November 5, 2002 General election with 2,735 votes (64.5%) against Democratic nominee Craig Shibley.

Political offices
Preceded by Mitch Carmichael	President of the West Virginia Senate; 2021–2025	Succeeded by Randy Smith
