= West Virginia's 15th Senate district =

American legislative district

West Virginia's 15th State Senate district
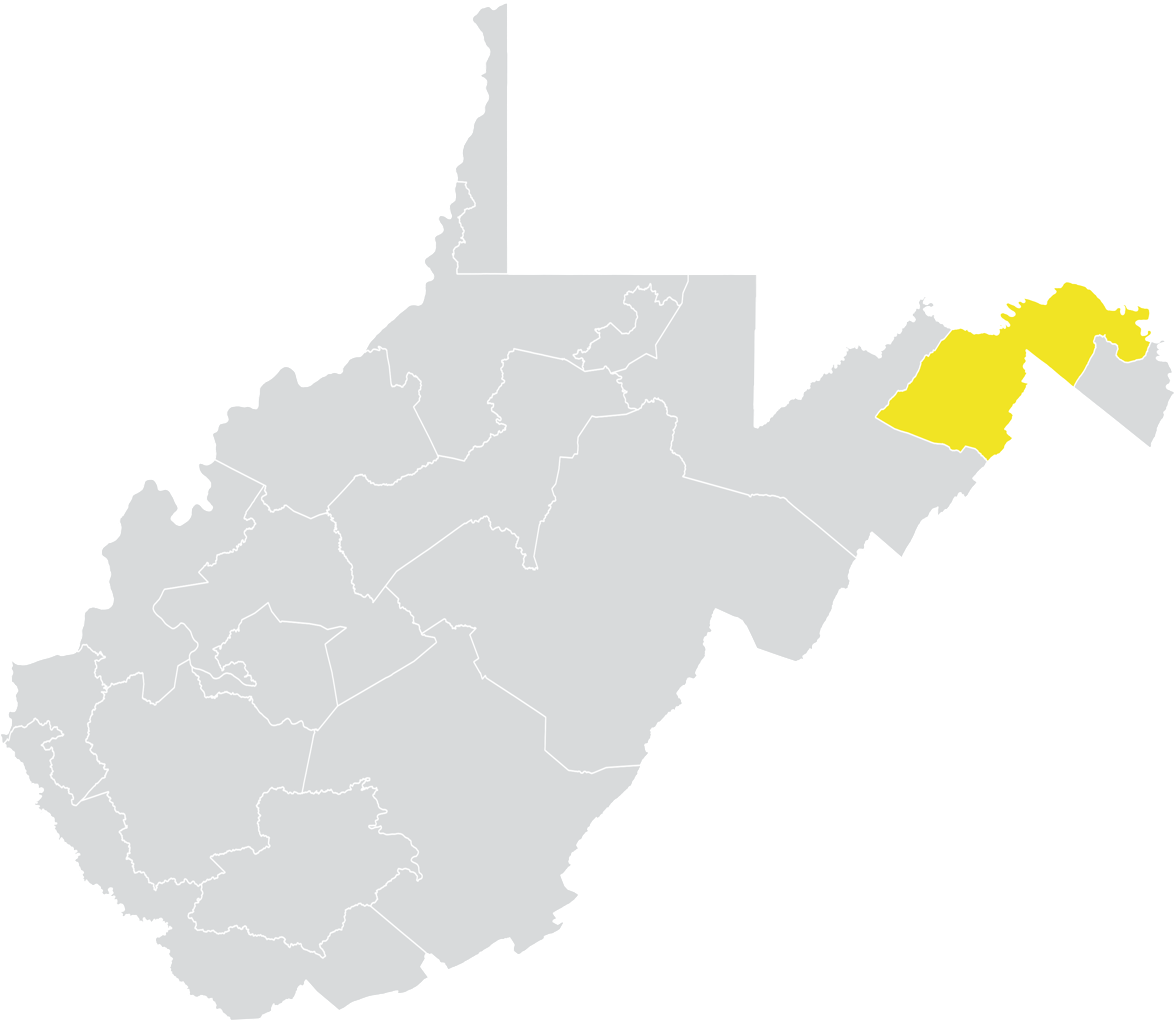
Senator
Charles S. Trump; R–Berkeley Springs
Tom Willis; R–Martinsburg
- Demographics: 93% White; 3% Black; 2% Hispanic; 1% Asian; 1% Other
- Population (2017): 119,259

West Virginia's 15th Senate district is one of 17 districts in the West Virginia Senate. It is currently represented by Republicans Charles S. Trump and Tom Willis. All districts in the West Virginia Senate elect two members to staggered four-year terms.

== Geography ==
District 15 is based in the state's Eastern Panhandle, covering all of Hampshire and Morgan Counties and parts of Berkeley and Mineral Counties. Communities within the district include Fort Ashby, Wiley Ford, Romney, Berkeley Springs, and Inwood.

The district is largely within West Virginia's 2nd congressional district, with a small portion extending into the 1st district. It overlaps with the 54th, 56th, 57th, 58th, 59th, 60th, 61st, 62nd, 63rd, and 64th districts of the West Virginia House of Delegates. It borders the states of Maryland and Virginia.

== Recent election results ==
=== 2024 ===
2024 West Virginia Senate election, District 15
Primary election
Party	Candidate	Votes	%
Republican	Tom Willis	5,475	44.4
Republican	Craig Blair (incumbent)	3,973	32.2
Republican	Michael Folk	2,885	23.4
Total votes		12,333	100.0
Democratic	Anthony Murray	2,846	100.0
Total votes		2,846	100.0
General election
Republican	Tom Willis	35,979	73.0
Democratic	Anthony Murray	13,318	27.0
Total votes		49,297	100
Republican hold			

=== 2022 ===
2022 West Virginia Senate election, District 15
Primary election
Party	Candidate	Votes	%
Republican	Charles S. Trump (incumbent)	21,137	80.4
Upwising WV	Robin Mills	5,148	19.6
Total votes		26,285	100

== Historical election results ==
=== 2020 ===
2020 West Virginia Senate election, District 15
Primary election
Party	Candidate	Votes	%
Republican	Craig Blair (incumbent)	7,837	52.7
Republican	Kenneth Mattson	7,033	47.3
Total votes		14,870	100
General election
Republican	Craig Blair (incumbent)	41,560	80.1
Mountain	Donald Kinnie	10,324	19.9
Total votes		51,884	100
Republican hold			

=== 2018 ===
2018 West Virginia Senate election, District 15
Party	Candidate	Votes	%
Republican	Charles S. Trump (incumbent)	25,937	71.1
Independent	Jason Armentrout	10,562	28.9
Total votes		36,499	100
Republican hold			

=== 2016 ===
2016 West Virginia Senate election, District 15
Primary election
Party	Candidate	Votes	%
Republican	Craig Blair (incumbent)	9,702	67.8
Republican	Larry Kump	4,604	32.2
Total votes		14,306	100
General election
Republican	Craig Blair (incumbent)	32,475	70.4
Democratic	Brad Noll	13,629	29.6
Total votes		46,104	100
Republican hold			

=== 2014 ===
2014 West Virginia Senate election, District 15
Party	Candidate	Votes	%
Republican	Charles S. Trump	17,609	67.1
Democratic	Donald Cookman (incumbent)	8,622	32.9
Total votes		26,231	100
Republican gain from Democratic			

=== 2012 ===
2012 West Virginia Senate election, District 15
Party	Candidate	Votes	%
Republican	Craig Blair	28,766	80.8
Constitution	Daniel Litten	6,847	19.2
Total votes		35,613	100
Republican hold			

=== Federal and statewide results ===
Year	Office	Results
2020	President	Trump 74.3 – 23.9%
2016	President	Trump 74.8 – 20.6%
2014	Senate	Capito 71.5 – 24.7%
2012	President	Romney 67.5 – 30.4%
2012	Senate	Manchin 49.3 – 48.4%
2012	Governor	Maloney 52.9 – 43.2%
