= Fairness West Virginia =

West Virginian LGBT civil rights organization

Fairness WV
- U.S. State of West Virginia
- Formation: 2009
- Headquarters: 405 Capitol Street Charleston, WV
- Director: Andrew Schneider
- Website: https://fairnesswv.org

Fairness West Virginia (Fairness WV) is the statewide lesbian, gay, bisexual and transgender (LGBT) civil rights organization for the U.S. state of West Virginia. Founded in 2009 by Stephen Skinner, the organization is currently headed by Andrew Schneider and is headquartered in downtown Charleston.

Fairness WV has been at the forefront of many LGBT-related news events in West Virginia, such as aiding over a dozen towns and cities to adopt LGBT-inclusive nondiscrimination ordinances, helping transgender people execute legal name changes, lobbying for a statewide Fairness Act to bar sexual orientation and gender identity discrimination in employment, housing and public places, and rallying support for LGBT issues and causes among the state's faith communities.

In 2015, Fairness made national news for its work helping Thurmond (population: 5) pass an LGBT-inclusive nondiscrimination ordinance making it the "smallest town in the nation with a ban on employment, housing and public accommodation discrimination against LGBT individuals." In 2017, the organization made headlines again as a successful party on behalf of a lesbian couple who were harassed as they sought a marriage license in Gilmer County. As part of the settlement, the county agreed to require all officials and employees of the county commission and county clerk's office to participate in a training program provided by Fairness West Virginia. In 2021, Fairness also successfully advocated for Charleston and Morgantown to become the first cities in the state to ban conversion therapy for minors.

== Politics ==
Fairness has lobbied the West Virginia Legislature over the last decade on many LGBT related bills with a record of mixed success. In 2021, Fairness unsuccessfully lobbied to prevent the Legislature from passing House Bill 3292, which bans transgender athletes from competing in sports that match their gender identity. Fairness lobbied against the bill alongside other civil rights organizations, including WV FREE, Planned Parenthood South Atlantic, WV NOW, Women's March West Virginia, and the ACLU of West Virginia. Despite the lobbying, the bill passed the WV House overwhelmingly, and was narrowly approved in the WV Senate before being signed into law by Gov. Jim Justice.

Fairness has also struggled to pass the Fairness Act or Employment Non-Discrimination Act, which would add sexual orientation and gender identity to the state's housing and employment non-discrimination statutes. In 2020, Senate Bill 270—creating the Fairness Act — was introduced with bipartisan co-sponsors, including Senate Majority Leader Tom Takubo, R-Kanawha, Senate Majority Whip Ryan Weld, R-Brooke; Senate Minority Leader Stephen Baldwin, D-Greenbrier, and Senate Minority Whip Michael Woelfel, D-Cabell. However, then-Senate President Mitch Carmichael vowed the bill would not pass the Senate. The move was seen as an about-face, given that Carmichael had participated in a panel discussion hosted by Fairness just one month earlier presenting the bill.

A version of the Fairness Act has been introduced in the Legislature every year since at least 1993 and passed the then Democratic-controlled Senate in 2008 before being blocked in the then-Democratic controlled House of Delegates. Despite lobbying efforts, as recently as 2014, West Virginia was the only state where Democrats controlled both houses of the Legislature and the executive branch to fail to pass a law prohibiting employment discrimination on the basis of sexual orientation. The other 28 states had legislatures either partially or completely controlled by Republicans. Republicans took control of both chambers of the WV Legislature in 2015.

Fairness has also unsuccessfully lobbied West Virginia's congressional delegation to support federal legislation to extend protections in housing, employment and public accommodations to LGBT people. West Virginia's lone statewide elected Democrat, Senator Joe Manchin, was the only Democratic U.S. Senator not to sign on to the Equality Act in 2019. Republican Senator Shelley Moore Capito and WV's U.S. House delegation have also not signed on as cosponsors.

In 2015, Fairness successfully lobbied the Legislature to pass a bill making it easier for transgender people to change the gender marker on their driver's license.

== Leadership ==
Fairness WV has been led by Executive Director Andrew Schneider since 2014. Prior to joining Fairness, Schneider served as the Executive Director of the ACLU of Connecticut and ACLU of West Virginia.

The organization is also led by a Board, including Huntington Fire Chief Jan Rader, who was named to Time's 2018 100 Most Influential People List, former Kanawha County state senator Chris Walters, Chair of Beckley's Human Rights Commission Danielle Stewart, Eastern Panhandle Pride President Joseph Merceruio, and St. Thomas Episcopal Church Rev. Betsy Walker.
