= Stephen Skinner (American politician) =

American politician

Member of the West Virginia House of Delegates from the 67th district
- In office 2013–2016
- Preceded by: John Doyle
- Succeeded by: Riley Moore

Personal details
- Party: Democratic
- Occupation: Lawyer

Stephen Skinner is an American politician who formerly served in the West Virginia House of Delegates. A member of the West Virginia Democratic Party, he represented the 67th District in the legislature. He was first elected in the 2012 state elections. Skinner won re-election to the House of Delegates in 2014 by defeating Republican challenger and future Senator Patricia Rucker.

Skinner is a native of the Eastern Panhandle of West Virginia. His parents met at West Virginia University. Skinner attended West Virginia Wesleyan College as an undergraduate before graduating from West Virginia University College of Law.

He is the first openly gay candidate ever elected to the state legislature in West Virginia. Prior to his election to the legislature, Skinner was a founder of the LGBT advocacy group Fairness West Virginia.

In 2015, two men were indicted by a Berkeley County, West Virginia grand jury on charges that they plotted to kill Skinner by burning down his house.

In the 2016 election, Skinner ran for the 16th district seat in the West Virginia Senate that was vacated by Herb Snyder. Skinner was defeated in the election by Republican candidate Patricia Rucker.

Skinner is a trial lawyer and a partner with his brother at Skinner Law Firm. Skinner represents counties and municipalities in the national opioid litigation. He also filed a lawsuit against manufacturers of "forever chemicals" also known as PFAS for contaminated water in Martinsburg, West Virginia.
