= Austin Haynes =

Austin Haynes may refer to:

- Austin Haynes (politician)
- Austin Haynes (actor)
