= Tom Willis (politician) =

American politician

Member of the West Virginia Senate from the 15th district
- Incumbent
- Assumed office December 1, 2024 Serving with Darren Thorne
- Preceded by: Craig Blair

Personal details
- Born: Thomas Edward Willis Martinsville, Virginia, U.S.
- Party: Republican
- Education: University of Virginia (BA); University of Oregon (JD); Georgetown University (LLM)

Thomas Edward Willis is an American politician. He is a member of the West Virginia Senate for the 15th district.

Willis earned his BA from the University of Virginia, JD from the University of Oregon School of Law, and LLM in tax law from Georgetown University Law Center. He joined the West Virginia National Guard in 2000. In 2017, Willis and Harrison Gilliam bought the Glen Ferris Inn.

Willis ran as a Republican for the United States Senate seat held by Joe Manchin, a member of the Democratic Party, in the 2018 election. He lost the nomination to Patrick Morrisey.

Willis ran for the state senate in 2024, and defeated incumbent Craig Blair, the president of the West Virginia Senate, in the Republican Party primary election. Willis won the general election in November 2024.

In May 2025, Willis announced that he would challenge incumbent Shelley Moore Capito in the Republican Party primary in the 2026 United States Senate election in West Virginia. He placed second with 18.9% of the vote.
