= West Virginia House Bill 3293 =

2021 West Virginia law

In March 2021, West Virginia passed House Bill 3293, "Relating to single-sex participation in interscholastic athletic events," which restricts transgender students from participating on sports teams that "align with their gender identity". House Bill 3293 defines male and female “based solely on the individual’s reproductive biology and genetics at birth”.

The bill was signed into law in April 2021 by West Virginia Gov Jim Justice and was subsequently challenged in Federal Court.

On January 5, 2023, federal Judge Joseph Goodwin of the United States District Court, ruled that the bill was constitutional.

== Reactions ==
This law has been described by supports of transgender rights as "dangerous and hurtful, particularly for youth who are just trying to fit in”. Natasha Stone of Fairness West Virginia characterized the bill as fear-mongering, similar to bathroom bills that came before it. Stone said that, "Bill 3293 was just the newest way to attack trans people. Trans kids aren’t a danger. House Bill 3293 is a solution in search of a problem."

Those who oppose transgender rights, such as Christiana Kiefer, Senior Counsel for the Alliance Defending Freedom, have described the bill as "...a win for reality. The truth matters, and it is crucial that our laws and policies recognize that the physical differences between men and women matter, especially in a context like sports”.
