= Saira Blair =

American politician

Member of the West Virginia House of Delegates from the 59th district
- In office December 1, 2014 – December 1, 2018
- Preceded by: Larry Kump
- Succeeded by: Larry Kump

Personal details
- Born: July 11, 1996 (age 30)
- Party: Republican
- Parent(s): Craig Blair, Andrea Blair
- Education: West Virginia University
- Alma mater: Hedgesville High School
- Occupation: Politician
- Website: https://sairablair.com/

Saira Blair (born July 11, 1996) is a former politician from Martinsburg, West Virginia, and was the youngest person elected to state or federal office in the United States upon her election in 2014 (until the election of Jacob Bachmeier at age 18 to the Montana House of Representatives in 2016). In November 2014, aged 18, she was elected to the West Virginia House of Delegates, representing the 59th district, which is based in the Eastern Panhandle and encompasses portions of Berkeley County and Morgan County. She is a member of the Republican Party.

Blair, who studied economics and Spanish at West Virginia University, deferred her spring semesters to attend the Legislature's 60-day spring session, making up her classes in the summer and fall. She has stated that she plans to become a financial advisor and will not continue a career in politics after graduating, serving at most eight years in the Legislature. She has said that she has "no desire to climb the political ladder. Therefore, I don't see myself serving in any federal positions." Blair's father is Craig Blair, a Republican member of the West Virginia Senate. He served as her campaign manager.

Blair announced in 2018 that she would not seek re-election to the House. She was succeeded by Kump, who returned to office. After leaving office and completing her degree, Blair worked as a philanthropy and community engagement coordinator for Girls Inc. of Greater Philadelphia and Southern New Jersey until 2021, when W.Va. State treasurer Riley Moore appointed Blair as the new deputy treasurer for the Local Government Division of the state Treasurer's Office. Blair held the position until May 2023.

== Electoral history ==
In the May 2014 Republican primary, at the age of 17, Blair defeated two-term incumbent 59th district delegate Larry Kump by 875 votes (54.55%) to 729 (45.45%). Kump, who had succeeded Blair's father Craig in the House of Delegates, said that he was not surprised he lost. He cited his independent voting record and the desire of the district's Republicans to be represented by a Delegate who would conform better to the party line. Her victory was notable in that, being only 17, she was too young to vote in an election that she won.

In the November 2014 general election, Blair defeated the Democratic Party nominee, litigator Layne Diehl, also of Martinsburg, by 3,137 votes (62.69%) to 1,520 (30.38%), making her the youngest elected legislator in the United States. She was elected in the first election in which she was old enough to vote. Before running for office, Blair worked in her parents' apple orchard and for their water softening company. She donated $3,600 of her own money to her campaign, because "I wanted to show people that I had skin in the game."

Blair ran for re-election to a second term in 2016. She was unopposed in the Republican primary and faced Democratic nominee Catina "Cat" Webster in the general election. Blair defeated Webster by 5,863 votes (68.2%) to 2,731 (31.8%). She was, however, supplanted as the youngest state or federal legislator in the country by fellow Republican Josh Higginbotham, who was elected to the 13th District and is 12 days younger than Blair.

== Political positions ==
Blair describes herself as "very conservative" and identifies as fiscally conservative, "pro-marriage" and "pro-family." She opposes the morning-after pill and opposes abortion under any circumstances, even in the cases of rape and incest. She supports voter ID laws, requiring welfare recipients to be drug tested, term limits and making West Virginia a "right to work" state.

During the 2016 legislative session, while speaking about a bill she sponsored that would allow concealed carry of firearms without a permit, Blair said she had received "multiple death threats" during her first year as a legislator. She said that the threats were largely gender motivated and not related to her political beliefs. In January 2016, Blair was named the chair of the Legislature's Eastern Panhandle Caucus.

During her 2016 re-election campaign, Blair said that if re-elected, she hoped to be appointed to the House Education Committee, saying that improving education would help tackle the state's drug problem. She described herself as a "big proponent of career and technology schools", which she said were a better fit for some young people, who were made to feel "unsmart [sic]" by not attaining college degrees. She said that her sponsorship of the House's "pain-capable" abortion act, which prevents abortions after 20 weeks, was her proudest moment.

In February 2018, Blair was the only member of the House of Delegates to vote against a bill to increase West Virginia teachers' pay by 5%. Blair stated: "We've already voted out a pay raise, one that was fair and within our budget."
