= Donald Cookman =

American politician

Donald H. Cookman

Member of the West Virginia Senate from the 15th district
- In office January 12, 2013 – December 1, 2014
- Preceded by: Walt Helmick
- Succeeded by: Charles S. Trump

Personal details
- Party: Democratic
- Spouse: Paula Jean Strosnider
- Education: West Virginia University (J.D.)

Donald H. Cookman is an American politician and a former Democratic member of the West Virginia Senate representing District 15 in 2013 and 2014.

He was a circuit court judge for 20 years prior to being appointed to the state senate in January 2013.

== Election results ==
West Virginia Senate District 15 (Position A) election, 2014
Party	Candidate	Votes	%
Republican	Charles S. Trump	17,609	67.13%
Democratic	Donald H. Cookman (incumbent)	8,622	32.87%
Total votes		26,231	100.0%
