= 2022 West Virginia elections =

- November 8, 2022
- Registered: 1,156,147
- Turnout: 42.91% (▼20.34%)

West Virginia held elections on November 8, 2022. Elections for the United States House of Representatives, as well as the House of Delegates and 17 of 34 Senate seats were held. These elections were held concurrently with other elections nationwide. Primary elections were held on May 10, 2022.

== Federal offices ==
=== House of Representatives ===
Following the 2020 redistricting cycle, West Virginia lost one seat in the House of Representatives, leaving two seats up for election. Incumbents Carol Miller and Alex Mooney were re-elected to the 1st and 2nd districts respectively, while David McKinley of the old 1st District was defeated by Mooney in a primary.

== State legislature ==
=== State senate ===
17 of the Senate's 34 seats were held for election in 2022, including 9 Republican-held seats and 8 Democrat-held seats. Two Democrats, Bob Beach of District 13, and Mike Romano of District 12 retired, while one Republican, David Sypolt of District 14 retired. Gaining 7 seats, Republicans expanded their supermajority to 30 of the chamber's 34 seats, taking all Democrat-held districts except for District 5, and winning 16 of the 17 seats up. After the election, Democrat Glenn Jeffries changed his party affiliation to Republican, increasing their majority to 31 seats. Minority Leader Stephen Baldwin was one of only two state legislative leaders to lose a general election in 2022.

Senate elections: Republican gain Democratic hold Republican hold

West Virginia Senate
Party	Leader	Before	After	Change
Republican	Craig Blair	23	30	▲7
Democratic	Stephen Baldwin	11	4	▼7
Total		34	34	

=== House of Delegates ===
All 100 seats in the House of Delegates were up for election in 2022. 14 incumbents, including nine Republicans and five Democrats, retired. Republicans gained ten seats in the 2022 election, increasing their majority from 78 to 88 seats. 2022 was the first election in which all members of the House of Delegates were elected from single-member districts.

House elections: Republican win Democratic win

West Virginia House of Delegates
Party	Leader	Before	After	Change
Republican	Roger Hanshaw	78	88	▲10
Democratic	Doug Skaff	22	12	▼10
Total		100	100	

== Ballot measures ==
In 2022, four amendments appeared on the ballot, which were all rejected by voters.

=== Amendment 1 ===
The Clarification of the Judiciary's Role in Impeachment Proceedings Amendment would have amended the state Constitution to remove the ability for a state court to review the Legislature's decision in impeachment trials. The amendment was defeated by a nearly 16-point margin.

Amendment 1 Yes: 50-60%; No: 50-60%; 60-70%

Amendment 1
Choice	Votes	%
For	196,519	42.19
Against	269,316	57.81
Total	465,835	100.00

=== Amendment 2 ===
The Property Tax Modernization Amendment would have amended the state Constitution to authorize the Legislature to exempt machinery and other tangible property used in business activity from ad valorem property taxation.

The amendment was defeated by a 29-point margin.

Amendment 2 Yes: 50-60%; No: 50-60%; 60-70%; 70-80%

Amendment 2
Choice	Votes	%
For	170,013	35.49
Against	309,007	64.51
Total	479,020	100.00

=== Amendment 3 ===
The Incorporation of Churches or Religious Denominations Amendment would have amended the state Constitution to authorize the Legislature to incorporate churches and religious denominations. The amendment was defeated by a 9-point margin.

Amendment 3 Yes: 50-60%; No: 50-60%; 60-70%

Amendment 3
Choice	Votes	%
For	211,147	45.45
Against	253,379	54.55
Total	464,526	100.00

=== Amendment 4 ===
The Education Accountability Amendment would have amended the state Constitution to require the state Board of Education to submit policies to the Legislature to approve, amend, or repeal. The amendment was defeated by a nearly 16-point margin.

Amendment 4 Yes: 50-60%; No: 50-60%; 60-70%; 70-80%

Amendment 4
Choice	Votes	%
For	200,791	42.14
Against	275,683	57.86
Total	476,474	100.00
