= Randy Swartzmiller =

American politician

Member of the West Virginia House of Delegates from the 1st district
- In office December 1, 2018 – December 2020
- Preceded by: Mark Zatezalo
- Succeeded by: Mark Zatezalo
- In office December 1, 2000 – December 1, 2014
- Preceded by: Jeff Davis; Tamara Herron
- Succeeded by: Mark Zatezalo; Pat McGeehan

Personal details
- Born: May 14, 1960 (age 66) Weirton, West Virginia, U.S.
- Party: Democratic
- Spouse: Jeanmarie Skerbetz
- Children: Taylor Marie; Molly Katherine
- Education: West Liberty University (B.A.); Mountain State University (M.S.)

Randal "Randy" Duane Swartzmiller (born May 14, 1960) is an American politician and a former Democratic member of the West Virginia House of Delegates representing the 1st district from 2000 until his defeat for re-election in 2014. Swartzmiller again served in the House of Delegates from 2018 to 2020, when he left to be an unsuccessful candidate for the West Virginia Senate.

After a close loss to Senate Majority Whip Ryan Weld in 2020, Swartzmiller announced in 2022 that he would again seek election to the Senate. He is seeking to fill the seat won by former Sen. William Ihlenfeld, D-Ohio, in the 2018 election. Sen. Owens Brown, D-Ohio, was appointed to the seat in September 2021 after Ihlenfeld was sworn in as U.S. Attorney for the Northern District of West Virginia.

== Education ==
Swartzmiller earned his B.A. from West Liberty University and his M.S. from Mountain State University.

== Elections ==
- 2012 Swartzmiller and Representative Ronnie Jones were challenged in the three-way May 8, 2012 Democratic Primary where Swartzmiller placed first with 3,968 votes (45.2%), and placed first in the four-way two-position November 6, 2012 General election with 9,059 votes (36.3%) ahead of Representative Jones (D) and Republican nominees Carl Thompson and Justin Bull.
- 2000 When House District 1 Representative Jeff Davis left the Legislature and left a district seat open, Swartzmiller and Joe DeLong placed in the six-way 2000 Democratic Primary displacing Representative Tamara Pettit; they went on to win the three-way two-position November 7, 2000 General election.
- 2002 Swartzmiller and Representative DeLong were challenged in the four-way 2002 Democratic Primary but won, and were unopposed for the November 5, 2002 General election.
- 2004 Swartzmiller and Representative DeLong were challenged in the five-way 2004 Democratic Primary but won, and were re-elected in the four-way two-position November 2, 2004 General election.
- 2006 Swartzmiller and Representative DeLong were unopposed for both the 2006 Democratic Primary and the November 7, 2006 General election.
- 2008 When Representative DeLong ran for Secretary of State of West Virginia and left a district seat open, Swartzmiller placed first in the three-way May 13, 2008 Democratic Primary with 5,090 votes (45.9%); former Representative Pettit finished third. Swartzmiller placed first in the three-way two-position November 4, 2008 General election with 8,763 votes (40.0%) and ahead of Republican nominee Pat McGeehan and fellow Democratic nominee Benton Manypenny.
- 2010 When District 1 Republican Representative McGeehan ran for West Virginia Senate and left a seat open, Swartzmiller placed first in the four-way May 11, 2010 Democratic Primary with 3,213 votes (44.0%), and placed first in the three-way two-position November 2, 2010 General election with 6,853 votes (43.4%) ahead of fellow Democratic nominee Ronnie Jones and Independent candidate Amanda Mesler.
