= Cindy Lavender-Bowe =

American politician (born 1970)

Member of the West Virginia House of Delegates from the 42nd district
- In office December 1, 2018 – December 1, 2020
- Preceded by: George Ambler
- Succeeded by: Todd Longanacre

Personal details
- Born: August 2, 1970 (age 55)
- Party: Democratic
- Education: West Virginia Institute of Technology (BS); Marshall University (MS)

Cindy Lavender-Bowe (born August 2, 1970) is an American politician who served as a member of the West Virginia House of Delegates as a representative of the 42nd District from December 1, 2018 until December 1, 2020. Cindy Lavender-Bowe was one of just sixteen women elected to serve in the 84th West Virginia Legislature (nine re-elected; six elected; one appointed).

== Early life ==
Cindy Lavender-Bowe was born in Charleston, West Virginia to parents Kenny and Jeannie Lavender.

== Education ==
Lavender-Bowe received her bachelor's degree in social studies education from West Virginia Institute of Technology in 1993. In 2010, Lavender-Bowe obtained a master's degree in leadership studies/educational leadership and administration from Marshall University.

== Career ==
From 1993 until 2001, Cindy Lavender-Bowe was a teacher employed by Kanawha County Schools. In 2001, Lavender-Bowe became the Vice President of Marketing for Antique Log Cabins and Barns, LLC (Barnwood Living), a business she co-owns with her husband, Mark Bowe. Lavender-Bowe joined the staff of Carnegie Hall, Inc. as the Marketing and PR Director in 2009, and in 2011 became its Director of Development. She vacated this role in 2012 to accept a position as the Executive Director of the United Way of the Greenbrier Valley. She held this position until 2015, when she returned full-time to Barnwood Living as its Chief Development Officer.
