= Ken Reed (West Virginia politician) =

American politician (born 1968)

Member of the West Virginia House of Delegates from the 59th district
- In office December 1, 2020 – December 1, 2022
- Preceded by: Larry Kump
- Succeeded by: New boundaries

Personal details
- Born: Kenneth Reed; April 10, 1968 (age 58) Weirton, West Virginia, U.S.
- Party: Republican
- Children: 4
- Education: West Virginia University (BS)

Kenneth "Ken" R. Reed (born April 10, 1968) is an American politician, businessman, and pharmacist who served as a member of the West Virginia House of Delegates from the 59th district. He served from 2020 to 2022.

== Early life and education ==
Born in Weirton, West Virginia, Reed graduated from Brooke High School. He earned a Bachelor of Science degree in pharmacy from West Virginia University.

== Career ==
From 1992 to 1998, Reed worked as a pharmacy manager for Rite Aid. He has been the CEO of Reed's Pharmacy since 1998. He was also the president of the West Virginia Pharmacists Association. In 2014, Reed was a candidate for West Virginia's 2nd congressional district, placing second in the Republican primary after eventual winner Alex Mooney. He was elected to the West Virginia House of Delegates in 2020.
