= Austin Haynes (politician) =

American politician

Member of the West Virginia House of Delegates from the 32nd district
- In office December 1, 2020 – December 1, 2022
- Preceded by: Margaret A. Staggers
- Succeeded by: New boundaries

Personal details
- Born: March 5, 1997 (age 29) Beckley, West Virginia, U.S.
- Party: Republican

Austin Haynes (born March 5, 1997) is an American politician and businessman who served as a member of the West Virginia House of Delegates from the 32nd district. He served from 2020 to 2022.

== Background ==
Haynes was born and raised in Beckley, West Virginia and graduated from Oak Hill High School. After graduating, Haynes became a licensed insurance agent. He was elected to the West Virginia House of Delegates in November 2020 and assumed office on December 1, 2020. In 2022, Haynes was accused by multiple women of sexual harassment. Later that year, he was defeated by Elliott Pritt for election to the 50th district. In 2023, the sexual harassment lawsuit was dropped due to lack of evidence.

== Electoral history ==
West Virginia's 32nd House district General Election, 2020 Elect Three
Party	Candidate	Votes	%
Republican	Kayla Kessinger (incumbent)	10,760	22.56
Republican	Tom Fast (incumbent)	9,058	18.99
Republican	Austin Haynes	8,341	17.48
Democratic	Margaret Anne Staggers (incumbent)	7,264	15.23
Democratic	Mark Hurt	5,991	12.56
Democratic	Selina Vickers	6,290	13.19
Total votes		47,704	100.0%
Republican hold			
Republican hold			
Republican gain from Democratic			

2022 results by precinct: Haynes: Haynes—50–60%; Haynes—60–70%; Pritt: Pritt—50–60%; Pritt—60–70%

West Virginia's 50th House of Delegates district, 2022
Party	Candidate	Votes	%
Democratic	David Pritt	1,892	51.8
Republican	Austin Haynes (incumbent)	1,759	48.2
Total votes		3,651	100.0
Democratic win (new boundaries)			
