= Herb Snyder =

American politician (1953–2026)

Member of the West Virginia Senate from the 16th district
- In office January 14, 2009 – January 11, 2017
- Preceded by: John Yoder
- Succeeded by: Patricia Rucker
- In office January 8, 1997 – January 12, 2005
- Preceded by: John Yoder
- Succeeded by: John Yoder

Personal details
- Born: September 7, 1953 Winchester, Virginia, U.S.
- Died: August 3, 2026 (aged 72) Shenandoah Junction, West Virginia, U.S.
- Party: Democratic
- Spouse: Stephanie Shaffer
- Children: 6
- Education: Shepherd College (B.S.)

Herbert S. Snyder (September 7, 1953 – August 3, 2026) was an American politician. He was a member of the Democratic Party. Snyder served as a member of the West Virginia Senate representing District 16 from 1997 until 2005 and again from 2009 to 2017.

== Political career ==
Snyder served as a Jefferson County Commissioner from 1990 to 1996, when he was elected to his first term in the State Senate. He was reelected in 2000, defeating future Jefferson County Commissioner Greg Corliss. In 2004, he was defeated in the primary by former Ranson, West Virginia, Mayor Greg Lance, who went on to lose the November election to Republican John Yoder.

When Yoder announced he would run for State Circuit Court Judge in 2008, Snyder announced his bid for a third term. He defeated businessman Bob Adams, a Republican, in the November 2008 election.

After being elected to a fourth term in 2012, Snyder expressed interest in running for West Virginia's 2nd congressional district in 2014.

In the 2016 election, Snyder did not run for re-election to the state Senate, instead running unsuccessfully for the office of Jefferson County Clerk.

== Personal life and death ==
Snyder was a chemist and operated Hydrochem Labs. He lived in Shenandoah Junction, West Virginia, with his wife Stephanie. The couple has six children.

Snyder died in Shenandoah Junction on August 3, 2026, at the age of 72.
