= Owens Brown =

American politician

Member of the West Virginia Senate from the 1st district
- In office October 10, 2021 – December 1, 2022
- Preceded by: William J. Ihlenfeld II
- Succeeded by: Laura Chapman

Personal details
- Party: Democratic

Owens Brown is an American politician and activist who served as a member of the West Virginia Senate from the 1st district from 2021 to 2022. He was appointed in September 2021, succeeding incumbent Democrat William Ihlenfeld, who retired to become the U.S. Attorney for the Northern District of West Virginia. Upon his appointment, Brown became the first African American man to serve in the West Virginia Senate. In 2022, Brown lost in a primary election to delegate Randy Swartzmiller, who lost in the general election to Laura Chapman by more than 20%.

Brown also became just the second Black member in the Senate after Marie Redd.

== Personal ==
Brown lives in Wheeling, West Virginia. Brown currently serves as the president of the West Virginia NAACP, a position he has held since 2015. Prior to his appointment, Brown worked for nearly 30 years as an organization development specialist for the West Virginia Education Association, and served as the human and civil rights coordinator.

Brown holds a master’s degree in agency counseling from West Virginia University, a bachelor’s degree in psychology from West Liberty University and an associate’s degree in electro/mechanical engineering from Belmont Technical College.
