= Larry Kump =

American politician (1948–2026)

Larry D. Kump

Member of the West Virginia House of Delegates
- In office December 1, 2022 – February 28, 2026
- Preceded by: Redistricting
- Succeeded by: Donald Bennett
- Constituency: 94th district
- In office December 1, 2018 – December 1, 2020
- Preceded by: Saira Blair
- Succeeded by: Ken Reed
- Constituency: 59th district
- In office December 1, 2010 – December 1, 2014
- Preceded by: Craig Blair
- Succeeded by: Saira Blair
- Constituency: 59th district (2012–2014); 52nd district (2010–2012)

Personal details
- Born: January 27, 1948 Chambersburg, Pennsylvania, U.S.
- Died: February 28, 2026 (aged 78) Charleston, West Virginia, U.S.
- Party: Republican
- Education: Hagerstown Community College (AS); Frostburg State University (BS)
- Website: larrykump.com

Larry Douglas Kump (January 27, 1948 – February 28, 2026) was an American politician who served as a member of the West Virginia House of Delegates, representing district 94 from 2022 until his death in 2026. He previously served in the chamber from 2010 to 2014 and again from 2018 to 2020.

== Early life and education ==
Kump was born in Chambersburg, Pennsylvania, on January 27, 1948. He earned an associate degree from Hagerstown Community College and a Bachelor of Science degree in political science from Frostburg State University.

== Career ==
In 2010, when Representative Craig Blair ran for the West Virginia Senate and left his seat open, Kump was unopposed for the May 11, 2010, Republican primary, winning with 728 votes, and won the November 2, 2010, General election with 3,735 votes (57.1%) against Democratic nominee Michael Roberts, who had run for the seat in 2008.

In 2012, Kump was redistricted to the 59th district.

In 2014, Kump lost the primary to Saira Blair by a vote of 54.5 percent to 45.5 percent. Kump said that he was not surprised he lost, citing his independent voting record and the desire of the district's Republicans to be represented by a Delegate who would conform better to the party line.

In the 2016 election, Kump ran for the 15th District seat in the West Virginia Senate, held by fellow Republican Craig Blair. Kump was defeated by 9,823 votes (67.77%) to 4,671 (32.23%).

In the 2018 election, Kump ran for the 59th District seat in the West Virginia House of Delegates, defeating Democrat John Isner by a vote of 62.0 percent to 38.0 percent. Kump was defeated for reelection in the 2020 Republican primary by Ken Reed, 57.32% to 42.68%.

Kump won the 2022 Republican primary for House Of Delegates in the 94th District with two-thirds of the vote in a three-person race. He was reelected unopposed in the general election.

Kump was a candidate for reelection at the time if his death.

== Death ==
Kump died at a hospital in Charleston, West Virginia on February 28, 2026, at the age of 78, while still in office.
