= Todd Longanacre =

American politician (b. 1967)

Member of the West Virginia House of Delegates from the 47th district
- In office December 1, 2022 – December 1, 2024

Member of the West Virginia House of Delegates from the 42nd district
- In office December 1, 2020 – 2022 Serving with Michael Honaker
- Preceded by: Cindy Lavender-Bowe

Personal details
- Born: October 19, 1967 (age 58)
- Party: Republican
- Education: Glenville State College (AS, BS); Mountain State University (MS)

Military service
- Branch/service: United States Army
- Unit: 101st Airborne Division

W. Todd Longanacre (born October 19, 1967) is an American politician who was a member of the West Virginia House of Delegates.

== Education ==
Longanacre graduated from Seneca Trail Christian Academy in 1987. He earned an Associate of Science in forestry technology and Bachelor of Science in biology from Glenville State College, followed by a Master of Science in strategic leadership from Mountain State University.

== Career ==
From 1986 to 2015, Longanacre served in the United States Army. During his tenure, he was assigned to the 101st Airborne Division. From 1995 to 2001, Longanacre served as a naturalist and wildlife manager in the West Virginia Division of Natural Resources. He also owns a pizza restaurant and works as a survival skills instructor. Longanacre was elected to the West Virginia House of Delegates in November 2020 and assumed office the following month.
