= Michael Folk =

American politician from West Virginia

Mike Folk

Member of the West Virginia House of Delegates from the 63rd district
- In office January 12, 2013 – January 9, 2019
- Preceded by: District established
- Succeeded by: John Hardy

Personal details
- Born: Michael Craig Folk Martinsburg, West Virginia, U.S.
- Party: Republican
- Spouse: Stella Folk
- Education: Shepherd University (BS); West Virginia University (MBA)
- Website: Campaign website

Michael Craig Folk (born in Martinsburg, West Virginia) is an American politician. A Republican, he was formerly a member of the West Virginia House of Delegates, representing District 63.

== Education ==
Folk is a graduate of Hedgesville High School. He earned his Bachelor of Science degree in economics from Shepherd College (now Shepherd University) and his master of business administration from West Virginia University.

== Elections ==
- 2012: Folk ran in the May 8, 2012, Republican primary and won by 17 votes with 485 votes (51.4%), and won the November 6, 2012 general election with 3,096 votes (51.2%) against Democratic nominee Donn Marshall, who had run for a seat in 2010.
- 2014: Folk won re-election to the 63rd District, defeating Heather Marshall — wife of his 2012 opponent — by receiving 60.99% of the vote.
- 2016: Folk won a third term in the House by defeating Democratic challenger Kenneth Lemaster, receiving 58.5% of the vote.
- 2018: Folk sought election to West Virginia's 16th Senate district, but was defeated by incumbent John Unger.

== Candidacy for Governor ==
On February 5, 2019, Folk announced he would challenge West Virginia Governor Jim Justice in the state's 2020 primary elections.

== Controversy ==
On July 15, 2016, Folk tweeted that Hillary Clinton should be "hung on the Mall in Washington, DC" in response to her email controversy. He later stated that he regretted the comment, but reiterated his belief that Clinton should be tried for treason. Two days later, Folk was suspended from his job as a pilot for United Airlines over the comment.
