= Ronnie Jones (politician) =

American politician

Member of the West Virginia House of Delegates from the 1st district
- In office December 1, 2010 – December 1, 2016
- Preceded by: Pat McGeehan
- Succeeded by: Pat McGeehan

Personal details
- Born: November 9, 1953 (age 72) Weirton, West Virginia, U.S.
- Party: Democratic
- Children: 1

Ronnie Dale Jones (born November 9, 1953) is an American politician and a former Democratic member of the West Virginia House of Delegates representing District 1 between 2010 and 2016.

== Education ==
Jones graduated from Weir High School.

== Elections ==
- 2012 Jones and Representative Randy Swartzmiller were challenged in the three-way May 8, 2012 Democratic Primary where Jones placed second with 2,530 votes (28.8%), and placed second in the four-way two-position November 6, 2012 General election with 7,128 votes (28.5%), behind Representative Swartzmiller and ahead of Republican nominees Carl Thompson and Justin Bull.
- 2010 When District 1 Republican Representative Pat McGeehan ran for West Virginia Senate and left a seat open, Jones ran in the four-way May 11, 2010 Democratic Primary and placed second with 1,803 votes (24.7%), and placed second in the three-way two-position November 2, 2010 General election by 38 votes with 4,485 votes (28.4%) behind incumbent Representative Swartzmiller and ahead of Independent candidate Amanda Mesler.
- 2014 Jones and Swartzmiller were both defeated by former Delegate Pat McGeehan and Mark Zatezalo, both of whom were Republicans.
