= Joe Jeffries =

American politician (born 1981)

Member of the West Virginia House of Delegates from the 22nd district
- In office December 1, 2018 – June 1, 2022
- Succeeded by: Jarred Cannon

Personal details
- Born: August 16, 1981 (age 45) Des Moines, Iowa, U.S.
- Party: Republican
- Spouse: Tracy Jeffries
- Children: 2
- Education: Pittsburgh Institute of Aeronautics

Joe Jeffries (born August 16, 1981) is an American politician who served as a member of the West Virginia House of Delegates from the 22nd district. Elected in November 2018, he assumed office on December 1, 2018 and resigned in 2022.

== Early life and education ==
Jeffries was born in Des Moines, Iowa in 1981. He moved to WV with his parents when he was an infant. He earned a certification from the Pittsburgh Institute of Aeronautics after completing their truck driving program in 2008.

== Career ==
Outside of politics, Jeffries has worked as a maintenance manager and truck driver. He was elected to the West Virginia House of Delegates in November 2018 and assumed office on December 1, 2018. Jeffries served as the vice chair of the Fire Departments and Emergency Medical Services Committee until he was removed.

In the state legislature, Jeffries currently sponsors a bill that would forbid the displays and teaching of sexuality in public schools.

Jeffries was stripped of his committee assignment after he posted a sexually explicit video on social media.
