= Jarred Cannon =

American politician

Member of the West Virginia House of Delegates
- Incumbent
- Assumed office June 15, 2022
- Preceded by: Joe Jeffries
- Constituency: 21st district (2022 – present); 22nd district (2022)

Personal details
- Born: Jarred Alexander Cannon; December 23, 1997 (age 28) Huntington, West Virginia, U.S.
- Party: Republican
- Education: West Virginia University (B.A.)
- Occupation: Public Relations

Jarred Cannon is an American politician serving as a Republican member of the West Virginia House of Delegates from the 21st district, elected in the 2022 general election. He previously served the 22nd district after being appointed by Jim Justice in 2022 following the resignation of his predecessor Joe Jeffries from the legislature.

Cannon won the 2022 general election running as the Republican nominee in the 21st district. Before his appointment to the legislature, Cannon served as the director of the West Virginia Republican Party's Victory Program and as campaign manager for the congressional re-election campaign of Evan Jenkins. Cannon also serves on the board of the Ohio-West Virginia Youth Leadership Association (YLA) and owns Athena Consulting, a public relations firm.

== Electoral history ==
=== 2022 ===
General Election

West Virginia's 21st House of Delegates District, 2022
Party	Candidate	Votes	%
Republican	Jarred Cannon (incumbent)	3,502	68.1
Democratic	Theresa Jackson	1,640	31.9
Total votes		5,142	100.0

District 21 Republican primary results
Party	Candidate	Votes	%
Republican	Jarred Cannon	804	48.3
Republican	Michael Kidd	545	32.8
Republican	Branden Long	315	18.9
Total votes		1,664	100.0

=== 2018 ===
District 16 Republican primary results
Party	Candidate	Votes	%
Republican	John Mandt	1,345	22.6
Republican	Daniel Linville (incumbent)	1,142	19.2
Republican	Vera Miller	848	14.2
Republican	Jarred Cannon	844	14.2
Republican	Steven Davis	736	12.3
Republican	Chris Burger	679	11.4
Republican	Andrew Dornbos	367	6.2
Total votes		5,961	100.0

=== 2016 ===
District 17 Republican primary results
Party	Candidate	Votes	%
Republican	Matthew Rohrbach (incumbent)	1,996	43.5
Republican	Anne Brockus Dandelot	1,117	24.3
Republican	Jarred Cannon	802	17.5
Republican	Alex Parlock	675	14.7
Total votes		4,590	100.0
