= Mick Bates (West Virginia politician) =

American politician

Member of the West Virginia House of Delegates from the 30th district
- In office 1 December 2014 – 1 December 2022
- Preceded by: Linda Sumner
- Succeeded by: David Adkins

Personal details
- Born: 14 June 1970 (age 55) Broken Hill, New South Wales, Australia
- Party: Republican
- Other political affiliations: Democratic (until 2021)
- Spouse: Pamela Morgan
- Children: 4
- Education: Curtin University

Mick Bates (born 14 June 1970) is an Australian American politician who served in the West Virginia House of Delegates from the 30th district from 2014 to 2022.

In January 2022, Bates announced he would not seek re-election to the House of Delegates, intending to run for the 9th District in the West Virginia Senate. Bates was defeated in a primary contest by incumbent Rollan Roberts.

== Politics ==
Originally elected as a Democrat, Bates switched to the Republican Party in May 2021. In explaining the switch, Bates noted the dramatic increase in Republican voter registrations in Raleigh County — a 30 percent swing in the last three years — as part of the motivation for his party affiliation change. At the time, West Virginia Democratic Party Chair Belinda Biafore called Bates’ departure “surprising and disappointing.”

Prior to his party switch, during the 2021 legislative session, Bates had voted with the Republican majority on controversial proposals, including a bill that restricts transgender girls and women from playing on sports teams based on their gender identity and a rollback of abortion rights.

Bates had served in a variety of notable roles for the Democratic caucus — having been minority chair of the House Finance Committee and chair of the West Virginia House Democratic Legislative Committee. When then-House Minority Leader Tim Miley, (D-Harrison), chose not to run for reelection in 2020, Bates ran to lead the House minority, but Democrats ultimately chose Del. Doug Skaff of Kanawha County.

== Personal ==
Bates is a physical therapist and small business owner and resides in Beckley, West Virginia.

During his first run for office in 2014, Bates made much of his Australian upbringing and accent during his campaign, a tactic that was criticized by opponent Mel Kessler during the May primary election. Kessler supporters took out a billboard ad that featured a larger-than-life Australian kangaroo that was criticized by some as a negative campaign tactic.

Soothing an outcry from his own supporters, Bates embraced the icon of the Australian symbol and posed with toy kangaroos during his "Pick Mick" campaign. Bates told voters that he'd felt at home living in southern West Virginia, since his father and grandfather were both coal miners in Australia.

West Virginia Executive Magazine honoured Bates with the Young Gun Award in 2005, and he was named to the Generation Next Honoree 2006 list by The State Journal. In 2010, he was elected to the Raleigh Democratic Executive Committee and was chairman of the Beckley Raleigh County Chamber of Commerce in 2011.
