= Mark Zatezalo =

American politician

Member of the West Virginia House of Delegates
- Incumbent
- Assumed office December 1, 2020
- Preceded by: Randy Swartzmiller
- Constituency: 1st district (2020–2022); 2nd district (2022–present)
- In office December 1, 2014 – December 1, 2018
- Preceded by: Ronnie Jones; Randy Swartzmiller
- Succeeded by: Randy Swartzmiller
- Constituency: 1st district

Personal details
- Born: Mark Peter Zatezalo; March 16, 1952 (age 74) Steubenville, Ohio, U.S.
- Party: Republican
- Education: West Virginia University (BS); University of Missouri (MS)

Mark Peter Zatezalo (born March 16, 1952) is an American politician who has served in the West Virginia House of Delegates since 2020. A hydrogeologist by training, Zatezalo also served in the House of Delegates from 2014 to 2018.
