= Michael Honaker =

American politician (born 1965)

Member of the West Virginia House of Delegates
- In office December 21, 2021 – August 30, 2023
- Preceded by: Barry Bruce
- Succeeded by: Jeff Campbell
- Constituency: 46th district (2022–2023); 42nd district (2021–2022)

Personal details
- Born: November 11, 1965 (age 60) Union, West Virginia, U.S.
- Party: Republican
- Education: Bluefield College (BS)

Military service
- Branch/service: United States Marine Corps
- Years of service: 1984–1988
- Unit: III Marine Expeditionary Force

Michael Honaker (born November 11, 1965) is an American politician who served as a member of the West Virginia House of Delegates from the 46th district. Appointed by Governor Jim Justice in December 2021, he assumed office on January 4, 2022. On August 30, 2023, Honaker resigned from the House of Delegates after his appointment as the inspector general of the West Virginia Department of Homeland Security.

== Early life and education ==
Honaker was born in Union, West Virginia. He earned a Bachelor of Science degree in criminal justice from Bluefield College.

== Career ==
From 1984 to 1988, Honaker served in the United States Marine Corps, where he was assigned to the III Marine Expeditionary Force. He joined the Virginia State Police in 1989, serving as a trooper until 1995, a field sergeant until 2001, special agent in charge of criminal investigations, and field commander until 2017. He also worked as an investigator for a private intelligence company. Since 2018, he has served as director of homeland security and emergency management for Greenbrier County, West Virginia. Honaker was appointed to the West Virginia House of Delegates in December 2021, succeeding Barry Bruce. In 2023, he was appointed as inspector general of the state Department of Homeland Security.
