= West Virginia Legislature =

Legislative branch of the state government of West Virginia

- 86th West Virginia Legislature

Type
- Type: Bicameral
- Houses: Senate; House of Delegates

History
- Founded: June 20, 1863 (163 years ago)
- Preceded by: Restored Legislature of Virginia
- New session started: January 10, 2024

Leadership
- Senate President: Randy Smith (R) since January 8, 2025
- House Speaker: Roger Hanshaw (R) since August 29, 2018

Structure
- Seats: 134 voting members: 34 Senators; 100 Delegates
- Senate political groups: Majority (31) Republican (31) Minority (2) Democratic (2) Other (1) Vacant (1)
- House of Delegates political groups: Majority (91) Republican (91) Minority (9) Democratic (9)
- Authority: Article VI, West Virginia Constitution

Elections
- Last Senate election: November 3, 2026
- Last House of Delegates election: November 3, 2026
- Next Senate election: November 7, 2028
- Next House of Delegates election: November 7, 2028

Meeting place
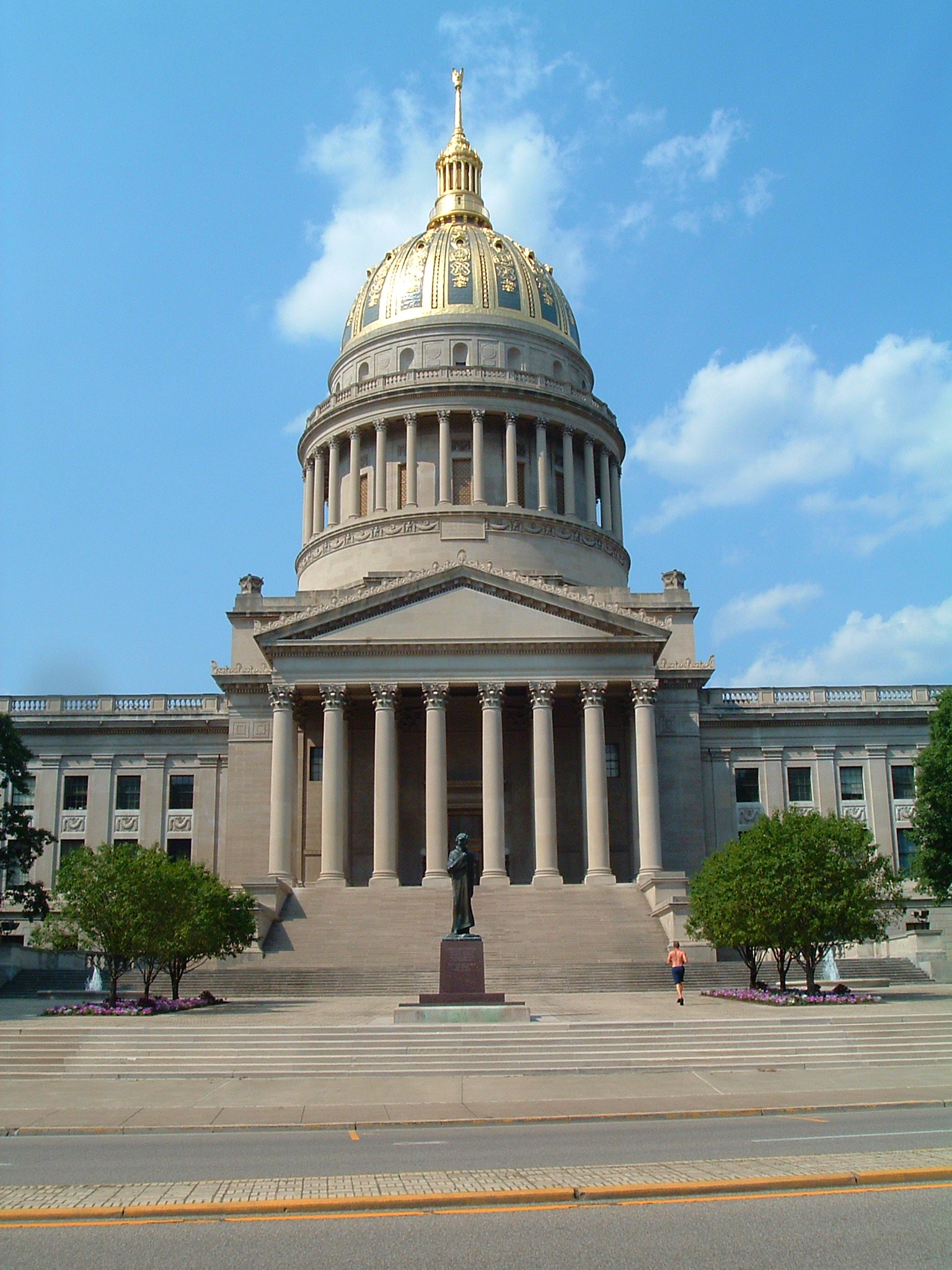
- West Virginia State Capitol; Charleston

Website
- www.wvlegislature.gov

Constitution
- Constitution of West Virginia

The West Virginia Legislature is the state legislature of the U.S. state of West Virginia. A bicameral legislative body, the legislature is split between the upper Senate and the lower House of Delegates. It was established under Article VI of the West Virginia Constitution following the state's split from Virginia during the American Civil War in 1863. As with its neighbor and former constituent Virginia General Assembly, the legislature's lower house is also referred to as a "House of Delegates."

The legislature convenes in the State Capitol building in Charleston.

== Terms ==
Senators are elected for terms of four years and delegates for terms of two years. The terms for senators are staggered, meaning that not all 34 state senate seats are up every election; some are elected in presidential election years and some are up during midterm elections.

== Organization ==
Regular sessions of the legislature commence on the second Wednesday of January of each year. However, following the election of a new governor, the session starts in January with the governor's address but then adjourns until February. On the first day of the session, members of both the House and the Senate sit in joint session in the House chamber where the governor presents their legislative program. The length of the general session may not go beyond 60 calendar days unless extended by a concurrent resolution adopted by a two-thirds vote of each house. The governor may convene the Legislature for extraordinary sessions. Given the part-time nature of the legislature of West Virginia, multiple extraordinary sessions are not uncommon.

== Legislative process ==
Bills, even revenue bills, and resolutions may originate in either house. Bills must undergo three readings in each house before being sent to the governor. Bills cannot contain multiple subjects and do not take effect until 90 days following adjournment, unless specifically approved to take effect immediately by two-thirds of the membership of each house.

Bills are drafted by the Office of Legislative Services or legislative staff counsel, reviewed by the sponsor of the bill and submitted for introduction to the clerk of the chamber of which the sponsor is a member. Bills are assigned to committees that make recommendations about a bill in the form of a committee report.

The governor has the power to veto bills. For budget bills or supplementary appropriations bills, two-thirds of the members elected to each house are required to override the governor's veto of a bill or line-item veto. For all other bills, a simple majority of each house is required.

== See also ==
- West Virginia House of Delegates
- West Virginia Senate
- West Virginia State Capitol
- List of members of the 85th West Virginia Legislature
- List of West Virginia state legislatures
