= Jason Barrett (West Virginia politician) =

American politician

Michael Jason Barrett

Member of the West Virginia Senate from the 16th district
- Incumbent
- Assumed office December 1, 2022 Serving with Patricia Rucker
- Preceded by: Hannah Geffert

Member of the West Virginia House of Representatives from the 61st district
- In office December 1, 2016 – December 1, 2022
- Preceded by: Walter Duke
- Succeeded by: Dean Jeffries
- In office December 1, 2012 – December 1, 2014

Personal details
- Born: July 16, 1982 (age 44) Martinsburg, West Virginia
- Party: Republican (December 2020–present)
- Other political affiliations: Democratic (until December 2020)
- Occupation: Businessman

Jason Barrett is a Republican member of the West Virginia Senate, representing the 16th district. Barrett is also a small business owner.

After serving one term in the state House of Delegates as a Democrat, Barrett was defeated by Republican challenger Walter Duke in 2014.

In the 2016 election, in which Duke did not seek re-election, Barrett defeated Republican challenger Travis Bishop to regain his seat in the House. He won again in 2018 and 2020 as a Democrat, but in December 2020, shortly after reelection, he changed his registration to Republican and joined the Republican caucus in the House.
