= Hannah Geffert =

American politician

Member of the West Virginia Senate from the 16th district
- In office October 10, 2021 – December 1, 2022
- Preceded by: John Unger
- Succeeded by: Jason Barrett

Personal details
- Party: Democratic

Hannah Geffert is an American politician who served as a member of the West Virginia Senate from the 16th district. She was appointed in September 2021, succeeding incumbent Democrat John Unger, who retired to become a Berkeley County magistrate. Geffert originally announced she would serve for the remainder of the unexpired term and would not seek reelection for a full term in the 2022 election. However, on March 2, 2022, she reported that she changed her mind and would run for re-election. She cited learning that the position would go unopposed and unfinished business in Charleston as reasons for her decision.

Geffert lives in Martinsburg, West Virginia. Geffert is a retired political science professor who taught at Shepherd University.
