= Kayla Kessinger =

American politician (born 1992)

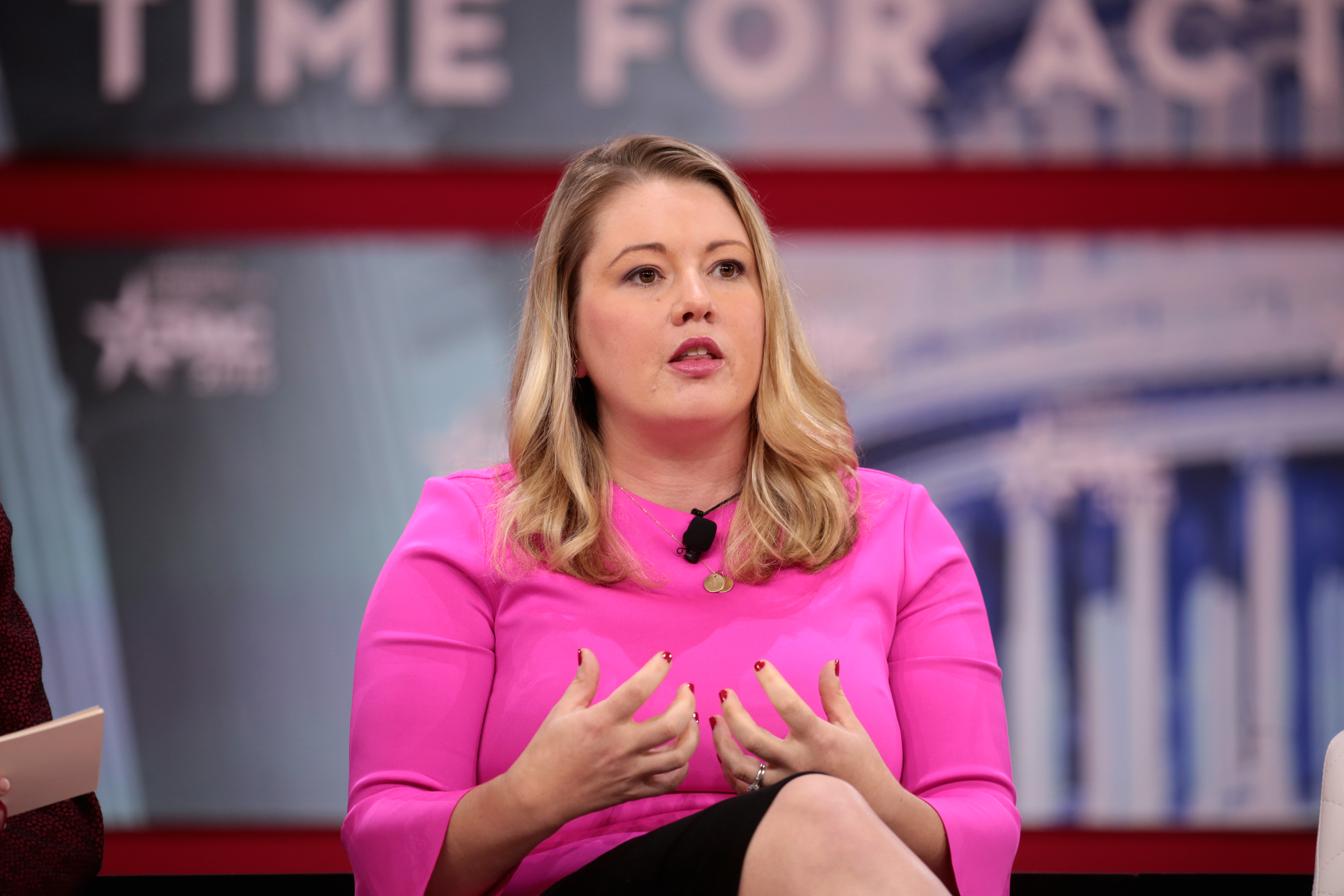
- Kayla Kessinger in 2018

Member of the West Virginia House of Delegates from the 32nd district
- In office December 1, 2014 – December 1, 2022

Personal details
- Born: November 25, 1992 (age 33) Beckley, West Virginia, U.S.
- Party: Republican

Kayla Kessinger (born November 25, 1992) is an American politician who served in the West Virginia House of Delegates from the 32nd district from 2014 to 2022.
