= John Unger =

American politician

John R. Unger II
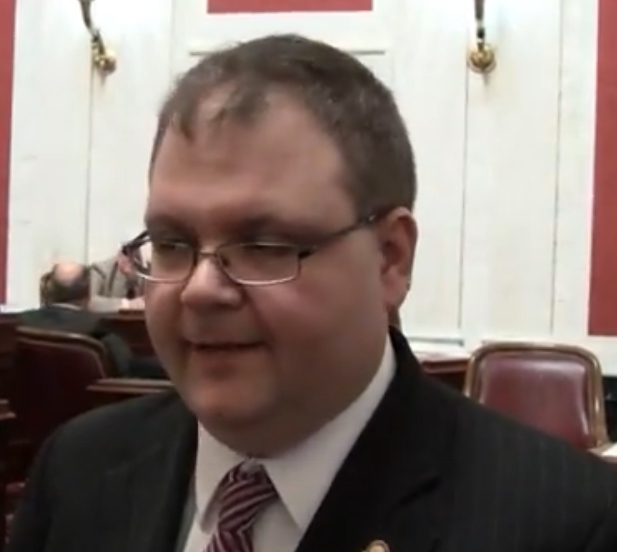
- Unger in 2012

Member of the West Virginia Senate from the 16th district
- In office December 1, 1998 – August 20, 2021
- Preceded by: Harry E. Dugan
- Succeeded by: Hannah Geffert

Personal details
- Born: January 24, 1969 (age 57) Martinsburg, West Virginia, U.S.
- Party: Democratic
- Spouse: Marti Steiner
- Education: West Virginia University (B.A.); University of Hong Kong; University of Oxford (B.A., M.A.)
- Profession: Pastor

John Ronald Unger II is a former American politician and magistrate. Prior to his appointment as a Berkeley County magistrate, Unger represented the 16th district in the West Virginia Senate from 1999 to 2021. The 16th District includes all of Jefferson County and a portion of Berkeley County. At the time of his retirement from the West Virginia Senate, Unger was the third active longest-serving senator and longest serving senator from the Eastern Panhandle.

== Legislature ==
During his time in the Legislature, Unger served as Majority Leader of the West Virginia Senate from January 2011 until November 2014 when Democrats lost control of the Senate as a result of Republican gains in the 2014 West Virginia Senate election. Unger then served as Minority Whip until 2017 when Marion County state Sen. Roman Prezioso became the new Minority Leader and appointed former Kanawha County state Sen. Corey Palumbo as Minority Whip.

== Personal ==
While a student at West Virginia University, Unger was named a member of the 1992 USA TODAY All-USA Academic Team and a Truman Scholar. He also went as a Rhodes Scholar to Oxford University and has a master’s degree in divinity from the Wesley Theological Seminary in Washington, D.C.

Unger is ordained as an ELCA Lutheran pastor, and serves the congregations of St. John Lutheran Church, St. John's Episcopal Church, and Bolivar United Methodist Church in Harpers Ferry, West Virginia. In addition, he is a chaplain for the Berkeley County Sheriff's Office.

== Election results ==
West Virginia Senate District 16 (Position A) election, 2018
Party	Candidate	Votes	%
Democratic	John Unger (incumbent)	18,802	52.14%
Republican	Michael Folk	17,257	47.86%
Total votes		36,059	100.0%

West Virginia Senate District 16 (Position A) election, 2014
Party	Candidate	Votes	%
Democratic	John Unger (incumbent)	12,287	52.49%
Republican	Larry V. Faircloth	11,122	47.51%
Total votes		23,409	100.0%

West Virginia Senate District 16 (Position A) election, 2010
Party	Candidate	Votes	%
Democratic	John Unger (incumbent)	18,800	50.43%
Republican	Craig Blair	18,482	49.57%
Total votes		37,282	100.0%
