= West Virginia's 16th Senate district =

American legislative district

West Virginia's 16th State Senate district
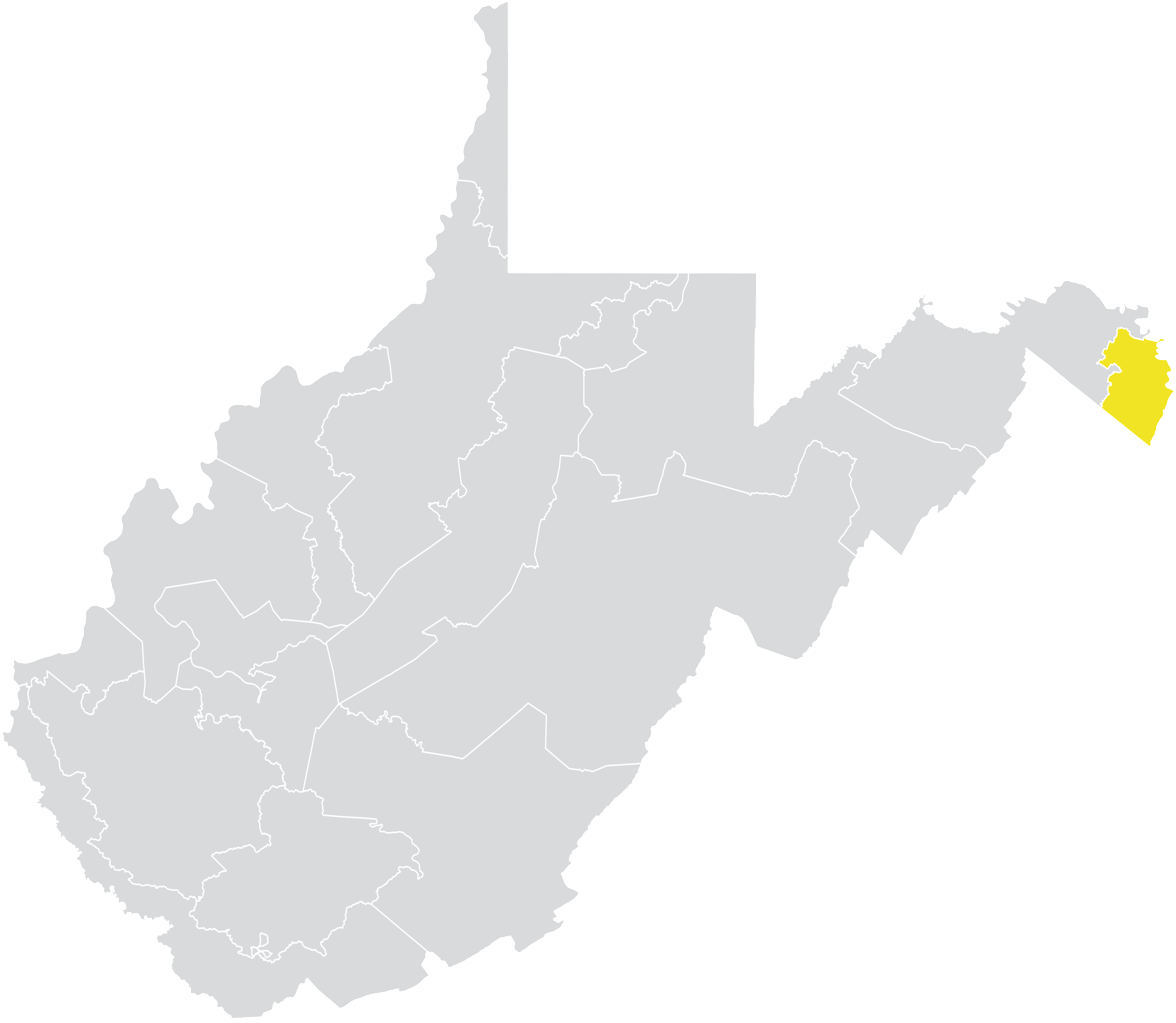
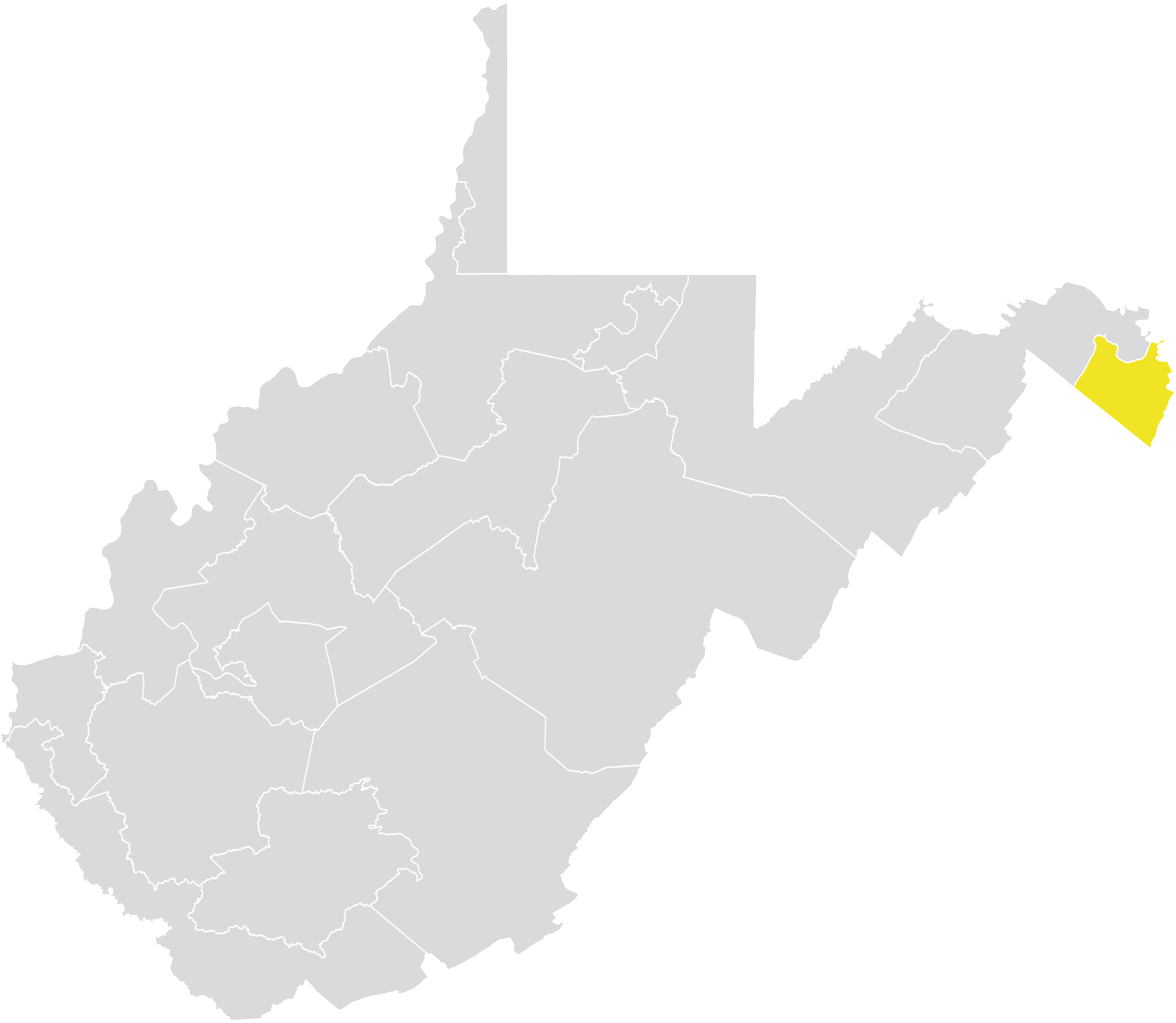
Senator
Jason Barrett; R–Martinsburg
Patricia Rucker; R–Harpers Ferry
- Demographics: 82% White; 8% Black; 5% Hispanic; 1% Asian; 3% Other
- Population (2017): 109,798

West Virginia's 16th Senate district is one of 17 districts in the West Virginia Senate. It is currently represented by Republican Jason Barrett and Republican Patricia Rucker. All districts in the West Virginia Senate elect two members to staggered four-year terms.

== Geography ==
District 16 covers all of Jefferson County and parts of Berkeley County at the far eastern edge of the state's Eastern Panhandle. Communities within the district include Martinsburg, Charles Town, Ranson, Bolivar, Harpers Ferry, Shepherdstown, and Shannondale.

The district is located entirely within West Virginia's 2nd congressional district, and overlaps with the 59th, 60th, 61st, 62nd, 63rd, 64th, 65th, 66th, and 67th districts of the West Virginia House of Delegates. It borders the states of Maryland and Virginia.

== Recent election results ==
=== 2024 ===
2024 West Virginia Senate election, District 16
Primary election
Party	Candidate	Votes	%
Republican	Patricia Rucker (incumbent)	5,193	51.1
Republican	Paul Espinosa	4,963	48.9
Total votes		10,156	100.0
Democratic	John Doyle	4,431	100.0
Total votes		4,431	100.0
General election
Republican	Patricia Rucker (incumbent)	31,003	60.0
Democratic	John Doyle	20,645	40.0
Total votes		51,648	100
Republican hold			

=== 2022 ===
Incumbent Democratic senator Hannah Geffert, who was appointed in 2021 upon the resignation of John Unger, did not seek election to a full term, and no fellow Democrat filed to replace her.

2022 West Virginia Senate election, District 16
Primary election
Party	Candidate	Votes	%
Republican	Jason Barrett	4,431	54.7
Republican	Renee Wilby	3,666	45.3
Total votes		8,097	100
General election
Republican	Jason Barrett	18,672	60.5
Democratic	Hannah Geffert (incumbent)	12,196	39.5
Total votes		30,868	100

== Historical election results ==
=== 2020 ===
2020 West Virginia Senate election, District 16
Party	Candidate	Votes	%
Republican	Patricia Rucker (incumbent)	25,582	51.8
Democratic	Pete Dougherty	23,768	48.2
Total votes		49,350	100
Republican hold			

=== 2018 ===
2018 West Virginia Senate election, District 16
Primary election
Party	Candidate	Votes	%
Democratic	John Unger (incumbent)	18,802	52.1
Republican	Michael Folk	17,257	47.9
Total votes		36,059	100
Democratic hold			

=== 2016 ===
2016 West Virginia Senate election, District 16
Primary election
Party	Candidate	Votes	%
Republican	Patricia Rucker	5,359	56.0
Republican	Joe Funkhouser	4,219	44.0
Total votes		9,578	100
Democratic	Stephen Skinner	6,904	67.2
Democratic	David Manthos	3,368	32.8
Total votes		10,272	100
General election
Republican	Patricia Rucker	22,499	52.8
Democratic	Stephen Skinner	20,122	47.2
Total votes		42,621	100
Republican gain from Democratic			

=== 2014 ===
2014 West Virginia Senate election, District 16
Party	Candidate	Votes	%
Democratic	John Unger (incumbent)	12,287	52.5
Republican	Larry V. Faircloth	11,122	47.5
Total votes		23,409	100
Democratic hold			

=== 2012 ===
2012 West Virginia Senate election, District 16
Party	Candidate	Votes	%
Democratic	Herb Snyder (incumbent)	20,764	53.9
Republican	Jim Ruland	17,763	46.1
Total votes		38,527	100
Democratic hold			

=== Federal and statewide results ===
Year	Office	Results
2020	President	Trump 55.7 – 42.1%
2016	President	Trump 56.8 – 37.5%
2014	Senate	Capito 59.7 – 37.1%
2012	President	Romney 51.9 – 46.0%
2012	Senate	Manchin 57.3 – 39.4%
2012	Governor	Tomblin 51.7 – 43.9%
