= Charles S. Trump =

American politician

Charles Trump

Justice of the West Virginia Supreme Court of Appeals
- Incumbent
- Assumed office January 1, 2025
- Preceded by: John A. Hutchison

Member of the West Virginia Senate from the 15th district
- In office December 1, 2014 – December 10, 2024
- Preceded by: Donald Cookman
- Succeeded by: Darren Thorne

Minority Leader of the West Virginia House of Delegates
- In office January 13, 1999 – December 1, 2006
- Preceded by: Bob Ashley
- Succeeded by: Tim Armstead

Member of the West Virginia House of Delegates from the 51st district
- In office December 1, 1992 – December 1, 2006
- Preceded by: Constituency established
- Succeeded by: Daryl Cowles

Personal details
- Born: Charles Samuel Trump IV; October 3, 1960 (age 65) Winchester, Virginia, U.S.
- Party: Republican
- Spouse: Susan Keller Johnston
- Children: 3
- Education: Princeton University (BA); West Virginia University (JD)

Charles Samuel Trump IV (born October 3, 1960) is an American lawyer serving as a justice of the Supreme Court of Appeals of West Virginia. He is a former Republican member of the West Virginia Senate. He represented the 15th district, which covers parts of the Eastern Panhandle of West Virginia. He was elected to the Supreme Court of Appeals for a 12 year term beginning on January 1, 2025 in the May 2024 non-partisan election. Trump is unrelated to Donald Trump, the current president of the United States.

== Biography ==
Trump graduated with an A.B. in politics from Princeton University in 1982 after completing a 118-page long senior thesis titled "Realignment and Dealignment: Two Eras of Political Upheaval in West Virginia." He then received a J.D. from West Virginia University College of Law. Trump was elected recorder of Berkeley Springs, West Virginia in 1987. He served in the West Virginia House of Delegates from 1992 until 2006, serving as minority whip from 1994 until 1998 and minority leader from 1998 until 2006. Trump was a member of the Electoral College in 2000 for George W. Bush. He successfully ran for the Senate in 2014. He resigned from the Senate in December 2024 prior to taking office as a justice of the state supreme court.

== Personal life ==
Trump and his wife, Susan, have three children: Charles, Rebecca, and Michael.

== Election results ==
West Virginia Senate District 15 (Position A) election, 2018
Party	Candidate	Votes	%
Republican	Charles S. Trump (incumbent)	25,937	71.06%
Independent	Jason A. Armentrout	10,562	28.94%
Total votes		36,499	100.0%

West Virginia Senate District 15 (Position A) election, 2014
Party	Candidate	Votes	%
Republican	Charles S. Trump	17,609	67.13%
Democratic	Donald H. Cookman (incumbent)	8,622	32.87%
Total votes		26,231	100.0%

West Virginia House of Delegates
Preceded by Bob Ashley	Minority Leader of the West Virginia House of Delegates; 1999–2006	Succeeded by Tim Armstead
Legal offices
Preceded by John A. Hutchison	Justice of the West Virginia Supreme Court of Appeals; 2025–present	Incumbent
