= Patricia Rucker =

American politician

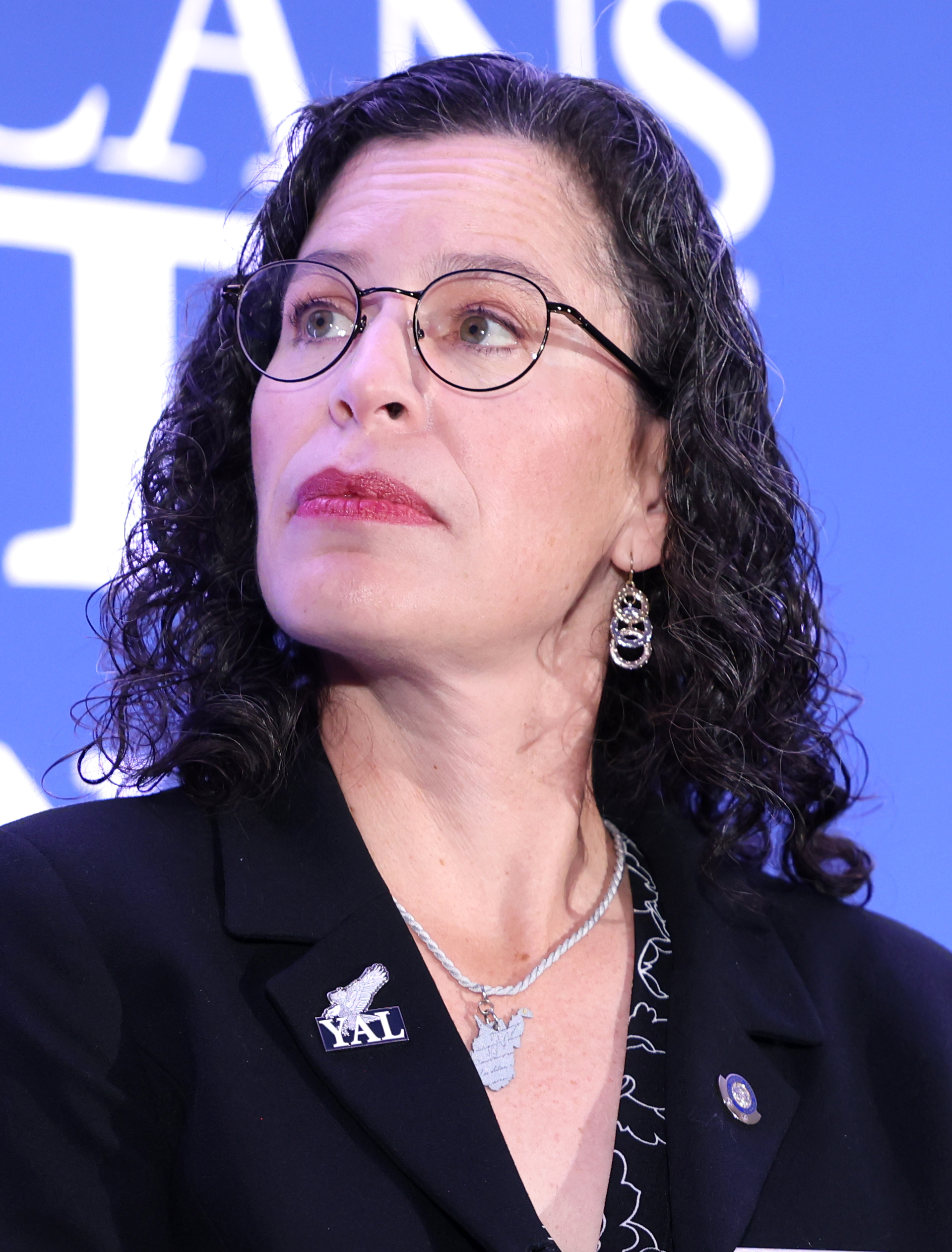
- Rucker at the 2024 Hazlitt Summit hosted by Young Americans for Liberty Foundation

Member of the West Virginia Senate from the 16th district
- Incumbent
- Assumed office December 1, 2016 Serving with Jason Barrett
- Preceded by: Herb Snyder

Chair of the West Virginia Senate Education Committee
- In office January 9, 2019 – August 29, 2022
- Preceded by: Kenny Mann
- Succeeded by: Amy Grady

Personal details
- Born: Patricia Elena Puertas; April 27, 1974 (age 52) Caracas, Venezuela
- Party: Republican
- Spouse(s): James M. Rucker, Jr.
- Children: 5
- Education: Trinity Washington University (B.A.)

Patricia Rucker (born Patricia Elena Puertas on April 27, 1974) is a Republican member of the West Virginia Senate, representing the 16th district since January 11, 2017. Rucker served as the chairwoman of the Senate Education Committee from 2019 to 2022.

Rucker was born in Venezuela. The first Hispanic woman to represent West Virginia's Eastern Panhandle, Rucker emigrated from Venezuela with her parents at the age of 6 and became a U.S. citizen in 2004.

== Election results ==
2020: After running unopposed in the 2020 Republican primary, Rucker faced Jefferson County Sheriff Pete Dougherty in the November 3, 2020 general election. Rucker beat Dougherty, 52-48%, to win a second term.

West Virginia Senate District 16 (Position B) election, 2020
| Party | Candidate | Votes | % |
|---|---|---|---|
| Republican | Patricia Rucker (incumbent) | 25,582 | 51.84% |
| Democratic | Pete Dougherty | 23,768 | 48.16% |
| Total votes | | 49,350 | 100.0% |

2016: After the retirement of Herb Snyder, Rucker ran for the Republican nomination in the open seat race. Rucker, a teacher and president of We The People of West Virginia and Jefferson County, a local tea-party affiliate, faced attorney and lobbyist Joe Funkhouser in the Republican primary. Rucker beat Funkhouser 56-44% to advance to the November general election. Rucker faced Delegate Stephen Skinner in a rematch of their 2014 House race. Rucker defeated Skinner 53%-47%.

West Virginia Senate District 16 (Position B) election, 2016
| Party | Candidate | Votes | % |
|---|---|---|---|
| Republican | Patricia Rucker | 22,499 | 52.79% |
| Democratic | Stephen Skinner | 20,122 | 47.21% |
| Total votes | | 42,621 | 100.0% |

West Virginia Senate District 16 (Position B) Republican primary, 2016
| Party | Candidate | Votes | % |
|---|---|---|---|
| Republican | Patricia Rucker | 5,359 | 55.95% |
| Republican | Joe Funkhouser | 4,219 | 44.05% |
| Total votes | | 9,578 | 100.0% |

West Virginia House District 67 election, 2014
| Party | Candidate | Votes | % |
|---|---|---|---|
| Democratic | Stephen Skinner (incumbent) | 2,636 | 51.29% |
| Republican | Patricia Rucker | 2,503 | 48.71% |
| Total votes | | 5,139 | 100.0% |

== Recognition ==
In 2024, the magazine Governing recognized Rucker on their Public Officials of the Year list for her work on school vouchers.
