= Pat McGeehan =

American politician

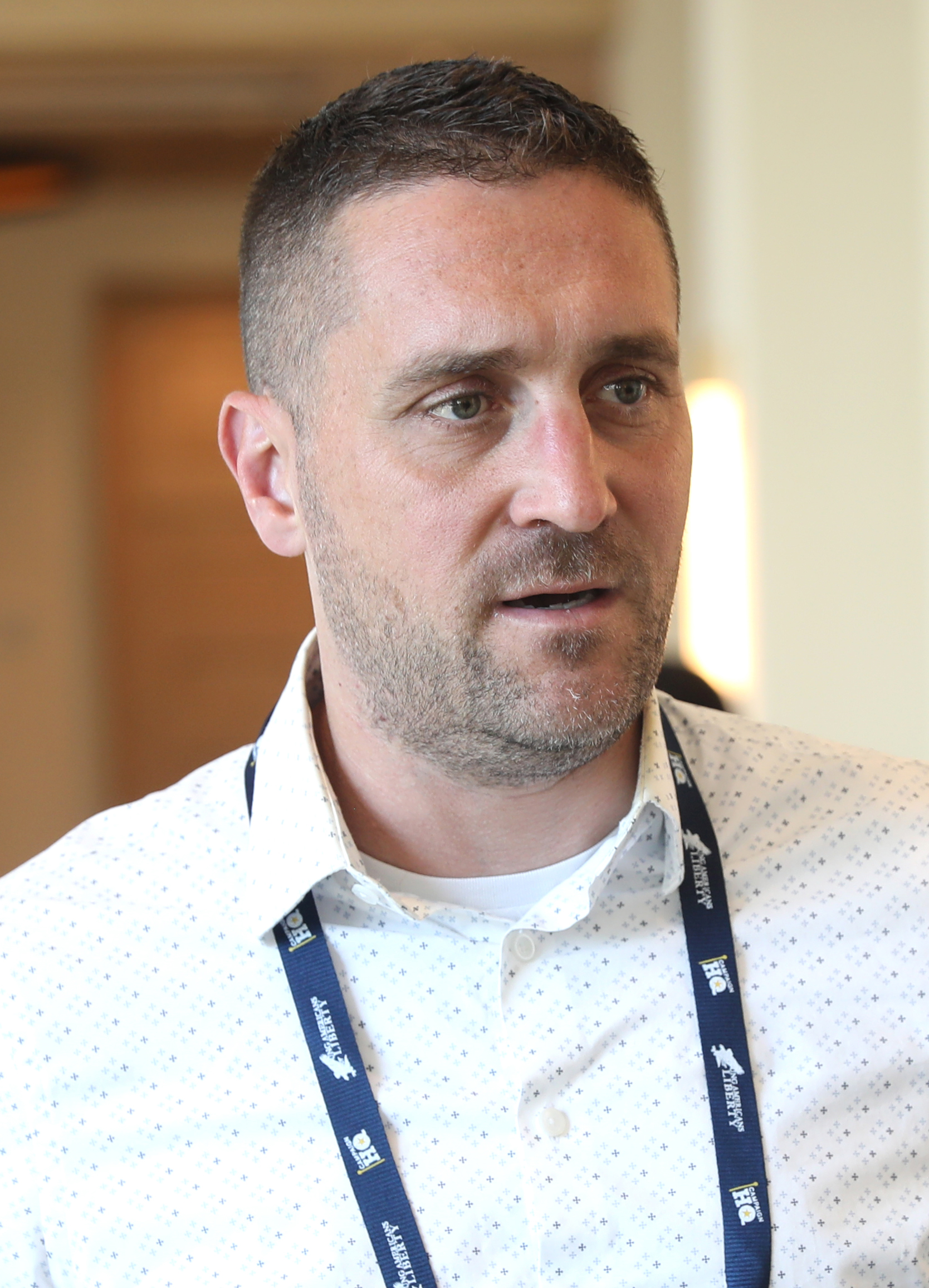

Majority Leader of the West Virginia House of Delegates
- Incumbent
- Assumed office January 8, 2025
- Preceded by: Eric Householder

Member of the West Virginia House of Delegates from the 1st district
- Incumbent
- Assumed office December 1, 2014
- Preceded by: Ronnie Jones
- In office December 1, 2008 – December 1, 2010
- Preceded by: Joe DeLong
- Succeeded by: Ronnie Jones

Personal details
- Born: Patrick Riley McGeehan; October 22, 1979 (age 46) Enid, Oklahoma, U.S.
- Party: Republican
- Education: United States Air Force Academy (BS); Franciscan University of Steubenville (MA); Duquesne University (attended)
- Website: State House website

Patrick Riley McGeehan is a six-term Republican member of the West Virginia House of Delegates and a former candidate for the United States Senate election in West Virginia, 2014. He is also the author of several books and essays on economics, politics, and philosophy. He is the son of Lt. Col. Mark McGeehan who died in the 1994 Fairchild Air Force Base B-52 crash.

== Biography ==
Although his family has their ancestral roots in West Virginia, Pat McGeehan was raised throughout his youth on military bases around the world. In 1994, at the age of 14, Pat's father was killed in the line of duty. Shortly afterwards, Pat and his mother, along with his two younger brothers, moved to their native home in the Northern Panhandle of West Virginia. From 1994 to 1998, Pat attended Oak Glen High School in New Cumberland, West Virginia, and subsequently gained an appointment to the US Air Force Academy in Colorado Springs. Upon graduation from the Air Force Academy, Pat served for several years on active-duty in the United States Air Force as an intelligence officer, eventually reaching the rank of captain. He served one tour in the Middle East, which included service in Afghanistan.

After leaving the military, McGeehan joined the business sector. In 2006 he became president of Mountain State Packaging Incorporated in Newell, West Virginia, and in 2007 became president of Panhandle Industries in Weirton, West Virginia. He left heavy industry and worked as an account director for Frontier Communications. Currently, he teaches history and civics at a private Catholic school.

In 2008, McGeehan entered politics and overwhelmingly won election to the House of Delegates as the first Republican from his district in more than fifty years. He represented the 1st District in West Virginia in the House of Delegates from 2008 to 2010.

As a member of the West Virginia House of Delegates, McGeehan served on the Constitutional Revision Committee, the Enrolled Bills Committee and the Government Organization Committee.

In 2010, McGeehan ran for the West Virginia Senate, District 1, but failed to win the GOP nomination. In 2012, he won the GOP nomination for that seat, but lost in the general election.

In 2012 he released a book entitled Printing Our Way to Poverty: The Consequences of American Inflation, which received strong praise from Congressman and former presidential candidate Ron Paul, as well as economist Dr. Andrew Young.

In April 2013, McGeehan announced he would be running for the United States Senate seat vacated by Jay Rockefeller.

On June 27, 2013, the Republican Liberty Caucus announced their endorsement of McGeehan.

On January 25, 2014, McGeehan suspended his Senate campaign and filed to run for his former seat in the West Virginia House of Delegates in 2014. McGeehan won election to his former seat in the November 4 general election.

West Virginia House of Delegates
Preceded by Eric Householder	Majority Leader of the West Virginia House of Delegates; 2025–present	Incumbent
