= COVID-19 pandemic in West Virginia =

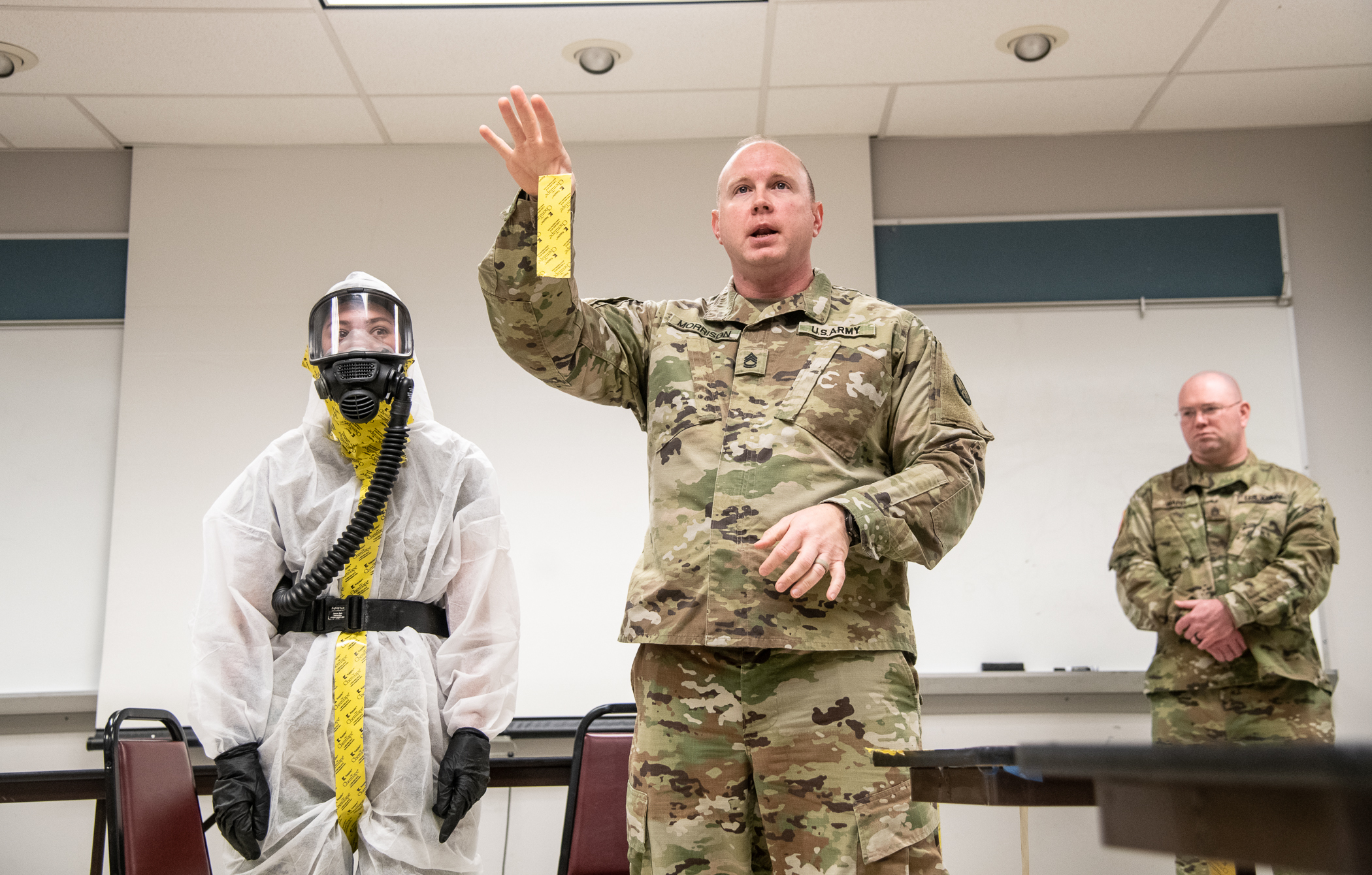
- Members of the West Virginia National Guard provide personal protective equipment training on March 16, 2020
- Disease: COVID-19
- Pathogen: SARS-CoV-2
- Location: West Virginia, U.S.
- Index case: Shepherdstown
- Arrival date: March 12, 2020 (confirmed March 17)
- Confirmed cases: 498,890
- Active cases: 2,575
- Hospitalized cases: 777 (Current)
- Ventilator cases: 82
- Recovered: 49,331 (December 21, 2020)
- Deaths: 6,794
- Vaccinations: 1,114,803 Have received first dose 962,044 Have received two doses (53.7%) 411,338 Have received a booster dose

Government website
- dhhr.wv.gov/COVID-19

The U.S. state of West Virginia reported its first confirmed case relating to the COVID-19 pandemic on March 17, 2020, becoming the last state to do so. The patient had shown symptoms for several days prior. On March 29, 2020, the state reported its first COVID-19 death.

As of April 2022 West Virginia had 498,890 confirmed cases of COVID-19 and 6,794 deaths from the disease. The National Center for Health Statistics estimates that between 99 and 434 excess deaths have occurred in the state through May 9, 2020. West Virginia has administered 1,189,041 COVID-19 vaccine doses, equivalent to 660 doses per 1000 people. 65% of the population have received at least one dose of the vaccine, and 57% are fully vaccinated.

== Timeline ==
=== 2020 ===
By March 16, 2020, West Virginia had tested 84 suspected cases of COVID-19. The state announced its first case, in Shepherdstown, on March 17. On March 18, the second case was announced. Also on that date, 148 West Virginians had been tested for the virus. On March 20, West Virginia had confirmed 8 cases of COVID-19. And on March 22, there were 16 confirmed cases.

West Virginia's first death occurred on March 29 in Marion County. The state's first death due to COVID-19 was an 88-year-old woman. At the end of March, there were 4,143 persons in West Virginia tested, of which 162 were positive and 3,981 were negative, alongside this one death. Counties with the highest number of positive cases were in Kanawha and Monongalia counties.

At the end of April 2020, there were 44,700 COVID-19 lab results received in West Virginia, of which 1,125 were positive. The death tally stood at 44.

At the end of May 2020, there were a total of 97,622 COVID-19 laboratory results received, of which 2,010 were positive. The death tally stood at 75.

At the end of June 2020, there were a total of 171,663 COVID-19 laboratory results received, of which 2,905 were positive. The death tally stood at 93.

On July 1, 2020, the cumulative COVID-19 positive test rate was 1.69 percent.

On July 16, an employee who worked for the West Virginia House of Delegates tested positive for the virus according to Speaker Roger Hanshaw, which resulted in closure of the clerk's office until further notice.

On July 25, Doddridge County became the last county in the state to report a positive COVID-19 case.

=== 2021 ===
Additional information needed

=== 2022 ===
On January 11, Governor Jim Justice said he had tested positive for COVID-19 and felt "extremely unwell". He had been vaccinated and boosted.

== Government responses ==
On March 13, Governor Jim Justice announced all schools across the state would close indefinitely beginning on March 16, 2020, as a proactive measure. In order to encourage people to get vaccines, Justice created a vaccine lottery called the "Do It for Babydog" lottery. Over $20 million was spent on prizes for participants.

On March 15, the mayor of Charleston, West Virginia, declared a state of emergency. Then, March 16, the Governor declared a state of emergency.

On March 17, Justice ordered restaurant dining rooms, bars, and casinos to close until March 31.

By March 21, several Mid-Ohio Valley counties had closed their courthouses to the public or limited access.

By March 22, Justice urged West Virginians to stay home as much as possible. Justice was joined by Dr. Clay Marsh, vice president of West Virginia University and executive dean for Health Sciences. Marsh said that New York was being hit by "a tsunami wave of coronavirus cases" and if West Virginians could stay home as much as possible for the next few weeks, the "tsunami wave" can become more "like a stream" for West Virginia.

Clay Marsh, vice president of West Virginia University and executive dean of Health Sciences, stated: "We are faced with a pandemic by a virus that we have no immune system that responds to, so we can't fight it ... If we do these things, we'll continue to be the leaders. We have demonstrated how we too, as a state pulling together, can protect each other and protect our health care workers. Once this window of opportunity is gone, it won't matter what we do then."

On March 23, Governor Justice ordered non-essential businesses to be closed immediately, and issued a stay-at-home order effective March 24 at 8 p.m.

On March 25, WV held a statewide Day of Prayer, a 45-minute service dedicated to the people affected with Coronavirus disease. It was held by Governor Jim Justice and moderator Dr. Dan Anderson.

On April 17, the West Virginia Department of Health and Human Resources announced it would work with the National Guard to test individuals for COVID-19 who resided or worked in the state's nursing homes.

On April 30, Justice announced "West Virginia Strong: The Comeback", a lifting of the present stay-at-home order that would transition to a safer-at-home plan. Specific sector businesses would be allowed to re-open over a month and a half after May 3, 2020, if certain parameters of COVID-19 testing were met. West Virginia's stay-at-home order would be lifted at 12:01 a.m. Monday, May 4 and be replaced with a safer-at-home program, which would strongly encourage residents to stay home but not make it mandatory to do so.

On May 14, the WV Governor and Dept. of Health and Human Resources announced plans to increase testing among minorities and otherwise vulnerable populations in counties with large populations and evidence of transmission. The next day, they announced free testing in WV counties that were medically underserved.

Religious entities have been excluded from the virus closures in the state. The WV Dept. of Health and Human Resources reported on June 13, a fifth outbreak at churches in the state had occurred. This time it was in Greenbrier County, which followed prior outbreaks at churches in Boone, Hampshire, Jefferson and Marshall counties. The Graystone Baptist Church in Greenbrier County had some 33 COVID-19 cases.

By July 1, some 115 COVID-19 cases were reported across West Virginia, the Governor stated, which were traced to residents traveling to Myrtle Beach, South Carolina. "I strongly urge anybody that's been to Myrtle Beach to please get tested" Justice said. In a July 1 press release, Justice reported testing over 10,000 inmates and 4,000 employees in the state's correctional system showed one active COVID-19 case in an inmate at the Huttonsville Correctional Center and Jail and two employees.

On July 2, Justice announced that he was considering making masks mandatory in indoor spaces where social distancing isn't possible. He issued an order on July 6 mandating masks in indoor public spaces outside of the home to reduce the spread of COVID-19.

On December 11, the governor announced that Pfizer vaccine will come soon for West Virginia. The vaccine deployment would be prioritized for hospital and long-term care facility workers, teachers, first responders, and essential sector workers in Phase One. Phase Two, planned to begin in March, are for the general populace that wanted to take the vaccine.

=== Federal response ===
West Virginia would receive $5.6 million of federal money to fight COVID-19.

On July 1, 2020, in his press release, Justice reported that West Virginia had been awarded over $24 million through the federal CARES Act.

== Impact on sports and the economy ==
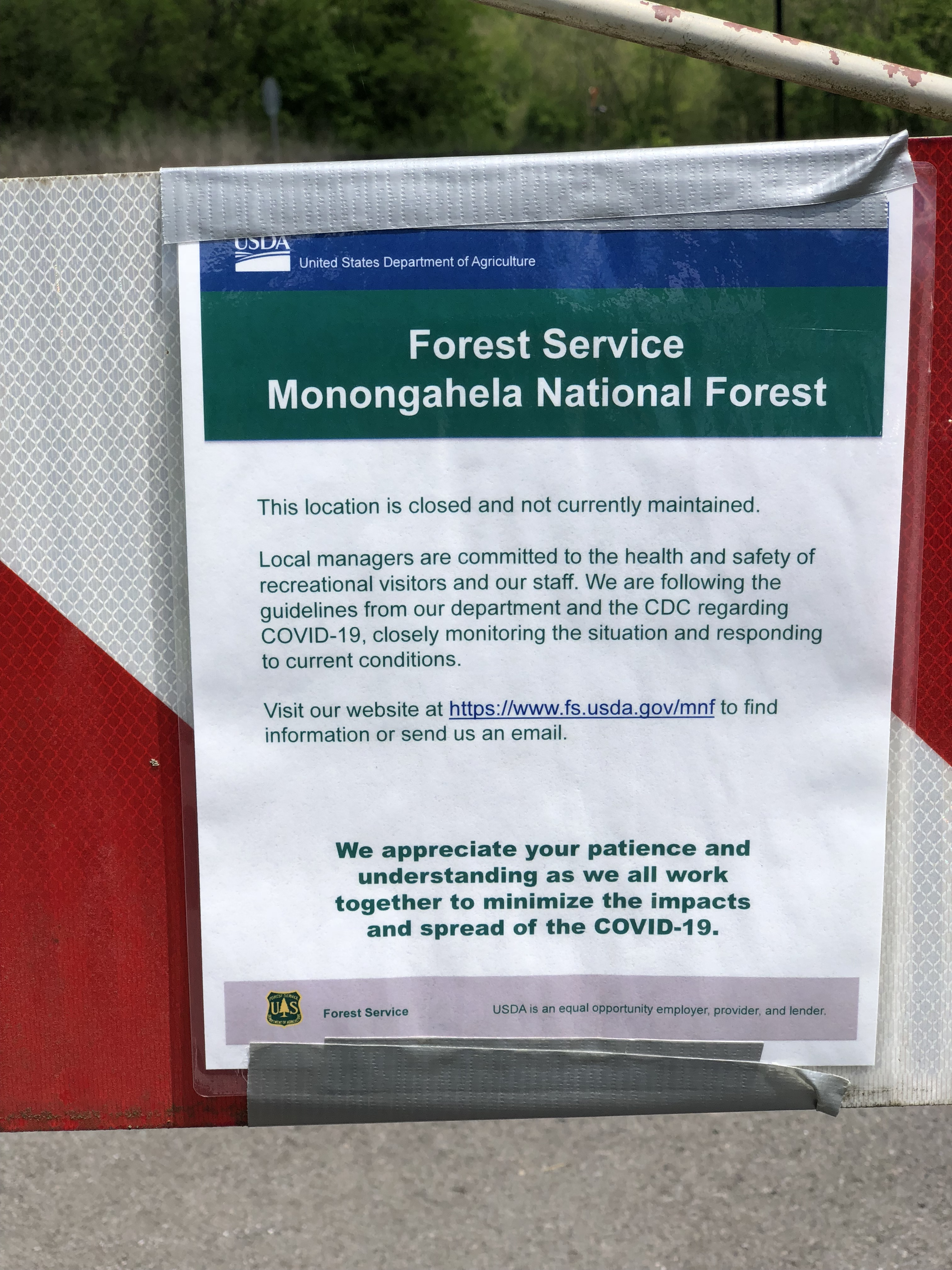
Sign indicating the closure of the Seneca Rocks Visitor Center due to the COVID-19 pandemic

On March 12, the National Collegiate Athletic Association cancelled all winter and spring tournaments, most notably the Division I men's and women's basketball tournaments, affecting colleges and universities statewide. On March 16, the National Junior College Athletic Association also canceled the remainder of the winter seasons as well as the spring seasons.

The governor's reopening plan required the state's cumulative positive test rate for COVID-19 to stay below three percent for three days, in contrast to the prior benchmark of having cases decline for two weeks.

The Associated Press reported over 250,000 unemployment claims were processed in West Virginia since the pandemic shutdown in March. Workforce West Virginia surpassed $1 billion in unemployment benefits to West Virginia residents. The unemployment rate in the state fell two points to 12.9 percent in May as the state started its reopening. West Virginia received over 35,000 fraudulent pandemic claims in June.

Justice, in his July 1 press release, announced "historic revenue surplus" in West Virginia for fiscal year 2020 amidst the COVID-19 pandemic. He also stated that overall consumer spending in the state returned to pre-pandemic levels in June, according to a state-by-state analysis he said was conduced by the Harvard-based research group Opportunity Insights.

The West Virginia Strong—The Comeback plan to restart the state's economy saw July 1 reopenings include fairs, festivals, amusement parks, and rides, along with outdoor open air concerts.

== See also ==
- Timeline of the COVID-19 pandemic in the United States
- COVID-19 pandemic in the United States – for impact on the country
- COVID-19 pandemic – for impact on other countries
