= List of executive air transports of U.S. states =

Some U.S. states have aircraft that are at the disposal of the governor or other state elected officials to easily travel around the state or make official trips out of state such as Federal meetings in Washington, DC. Air travel may also be opted for when ground transportation may pose security concerns or would not fit within a busy schedule with multiple stops across different parts of a state. Like air transports of heads of state and government of sovereign states, these usually consist of private executive aircraft or police and other state agency aircraft that can be also be used for passenger transport. Some states have acquired their fixed-winged aircraft at a discount through military surplus programs. As many of these aircraft tend to be smaller and may have smaller ranges, longer-distance trips (including out of state and international ones) or trips that have a larger entourage may be done on commercial aircraft.

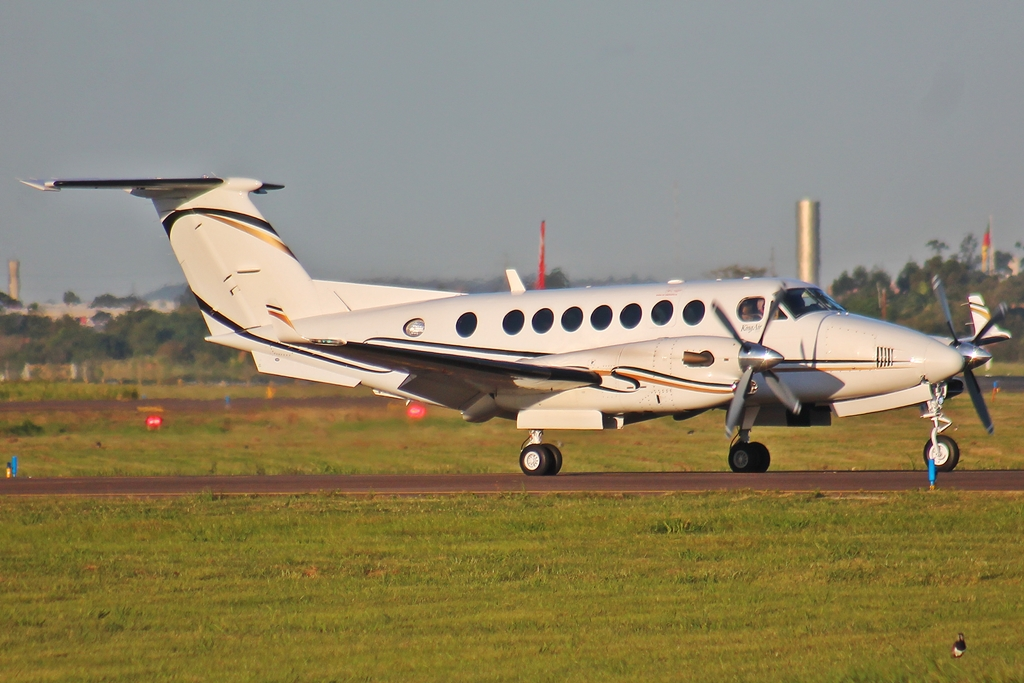
Many state governments utilize turboprop aircraft like the Beechcraft King Air similar to this one for executive transport.

== Summary list ==
Governors' access to state executive air transportation
State	Airplane	Helicopter	Receives travel allowance	Reimbursement for travel expenses
Alabama	Yes	Yes	No	Yes
Alaska	Yes	No	No	Yes
Arizona	Yes	Yes	No	Yes
Arkansas	Yes	Yes	No	Yes
California	No	No	No	?
Colorado	Yes	No	No	Yes
Connecticut	No	No	No	No
Delaware	No	No	No	No
Florida	Yes	No	?	?
Georgia	Yes	Yes	No	No
Hawaiʻi	No	No	Yes	Yes
Idaho	Yes	No	No	Yes
Illinois	No	No	No	No
Indiana	No	Yes	Yes	Yes
Iowa	No	No	No	Yes
Kansas	Yes	Yes	No	Yes
Kentucky	No	No	No	Yes
Louisiana	Yes	Yes	No	Yes
Maine	No	No	No	Yes
Maryland	Yes	Yes	?	?
Massachusetts	No	Yes	Yes	Yes
Michigan	Yes	Yes	?	?
Minnesota	No	No	No	Yes
Mississippi	Yes	No	No	Yes
Missouri	Yes	No	?	?
Montana	Yes	Yes	No	Yes
Nebraska	Yes	No	Yes	Yes
Nevada	Yes	No	Yes	Yes
New Hampshire	No	No	No	Yes
New Jersey	No	Yes	No	Yes
New Mexico	Yes	Yes	No	Yes
New York	Yes	Yes	No	Yes
North Carolina	Yes	No	Yes	Yes
North Dakota	Yes	No	No	Yes
Ohio	Yes	Yes	No	Yes
Oklahoma	Yes	No	No	Yes
Oregon	No	No	Yes	Yes
Pennsylvania	Yes	No	No	Yes
Rhode Island	No	Yes	No	Yes
South Carolina	Yes	No	No	Yes
South Dakota	Yes	No	No	Yes
Tennessee	Yes	Yes	Yes	?
Texas	Yes	Yes	No	Yes
Utah	Yes	Yes	No	Yes
Vermont	Yes	No	No	No
Virginia	Yes	Yes	No	Yes
Washington	Yes	No	?	?
West Virginia	Yes	Yes	?	No
Wisconsin	Yes	No	No	Yes
Wyoming	Yes	No	No	Yes
American Samoa	No	No	?	No
District of Columbia	?	?	?	Yes
Guam	No	No	Yes	No
Northern Mariana Islands	No	No	?	No
Puerto Rico	No	No	No	Yes
U.S. Virgin Islands	No	No	No	Yes

== Alabama ==
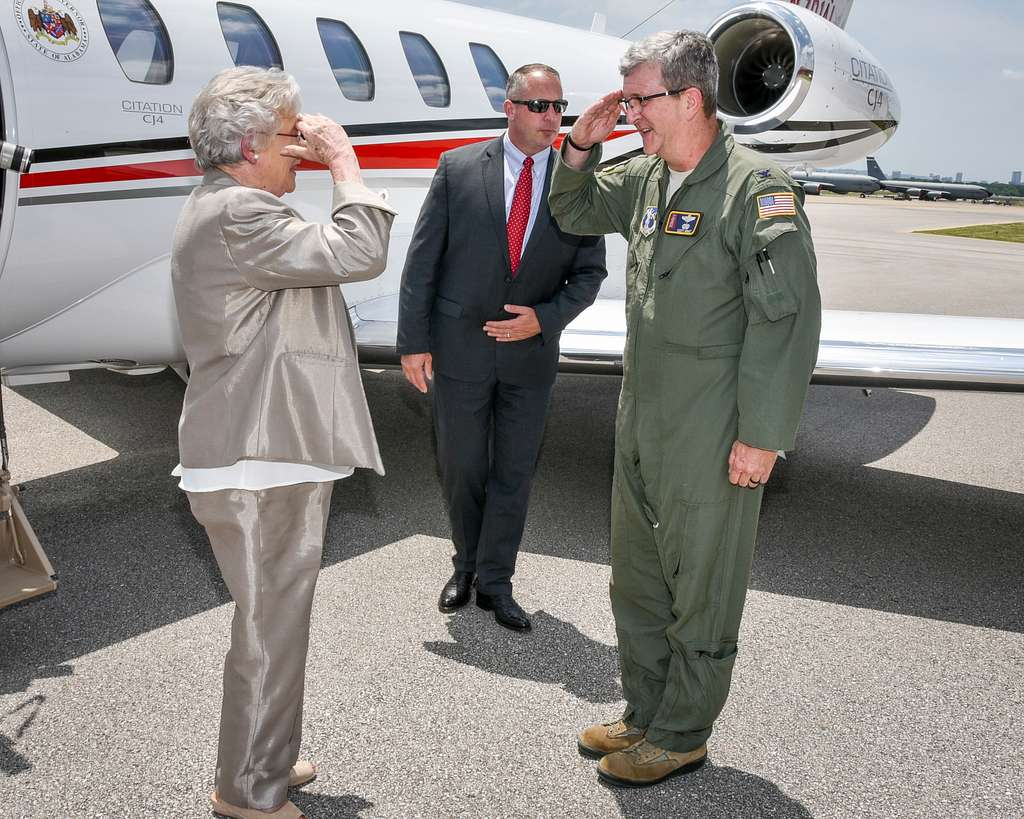
Governor Kay Ivey arrives at Sumpter Smith Air National Guard Base on a state Citation CJ4

The Alabama Law Enforcement Agency has a fleet of 8 Bell OH-58 helicopters and two airplanes that can be used for executive transportation. These aircraft are also used for prisoner transportation, criminal pursuits, and search and rescue. The fixed-wing fleet includes a 15-seater Beechcraft C-12 Huron.

The use of government aircraft came under scrutiny when a state aircraft was used in December 2014 to retrieve Governor Robert Bentley's wallet that he had forgotten in his Fort Morgan home.

== Alaska ==
The state used to have Westwind II jet which was purchased for $2.7 million in 2005 by the Murkowski administration. His successor, Sarah Palin, sold the jet as part of a campaign promise. It was originally listed on eBay in August 2007, but was ultimately sold by a private brokerage firm for $2.1 million.

The Alaska Department of Public Safety Aircraft Section has 44 aircraft (both fixed-wing airplanes and helicopters) in its fleet which the Governor may use in certain cases.

== Arizona ==
The Arizona state government has 2 Beechcraft Super King Air 200s that can be used by state officials. In 2015, Governor Doug Ducey downsized the fleet which totaled at 10 aircraft at the time and acquired two M-28 Sky Trucks for free from the Federal government. The fleet is managed by the Arizona Department of Public Safety.

In 2022, Republican gubernatorial candidate Karrin Taylor Robson came under fire for using a state plane to return from a campaign event. She had traveled earlier on the day on her own jet from campaign event in Peoria to Marana and then onto Tucson with Governor Ducey and former Vice President Mike Pence. However Pence left Tucson on Robson's private jet to Reno, Nevada, whereas Robson and Governor Ducey took the state aircraft back to Phoenix. The Governor's Office confirmed that the cost of using the state aircraft would be billed to the Robson campaign.

== Arkansas ==
The Arkansas State Police (ASP) Air Support Unit provides transportation for the Governor. The fleet comprises a Bell 407 helicopter, Cessna 206, and a Beechcraft B200 King Air.

In a state audit of flight logs between June 2022 and December 2023, 57% of the flight hours on the ASP airplane were governor-related whereas 2% of the flight hours on the helicopter were governor-related. A law was passed during Governor Sarah Huckabee Sanders' term that shielded much of the expenditures of the Governor's Office from the public's review, including the cost for the use of state aircraft.

== California ==
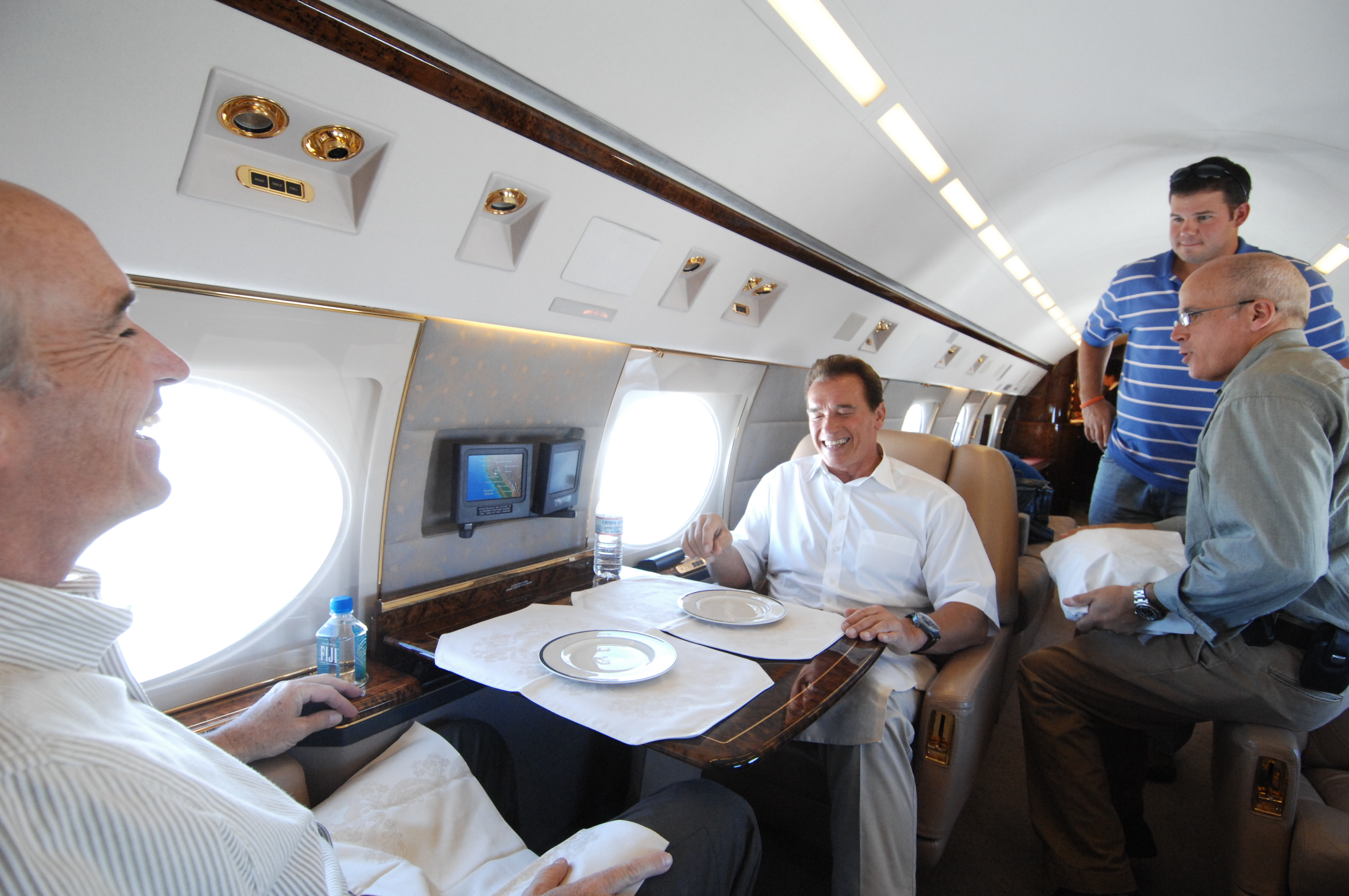
Governor Schwarzenegger with Interior Secretary Dirk Kempthorne on a plane after visiting Whiskeytown Complex fires in 2008

During Governor Jerry Brown's second term, he occasionally used California Highway Patrol Beechcraft Super King Air 200 airplane for business related to the law enforcement department, but he mostly relied on commercial air travel for official business. During his first term between 1975 and 1983, he sold the governor's plane.

During his term, Governor Arnold Schwarzenegger commuted from his home in Los Angeles to the state capital of Sacramento using his own private Gulfstream III jet, which he also used to travel around the state for official duties.

Out-of-state trips are usually done using commercial air travel and are funded by the California State Protocol Foundation, a non-profit which also pays for ceremonial events like the gubernatorial inauguration and state of the state speeches.

== Colorado ==
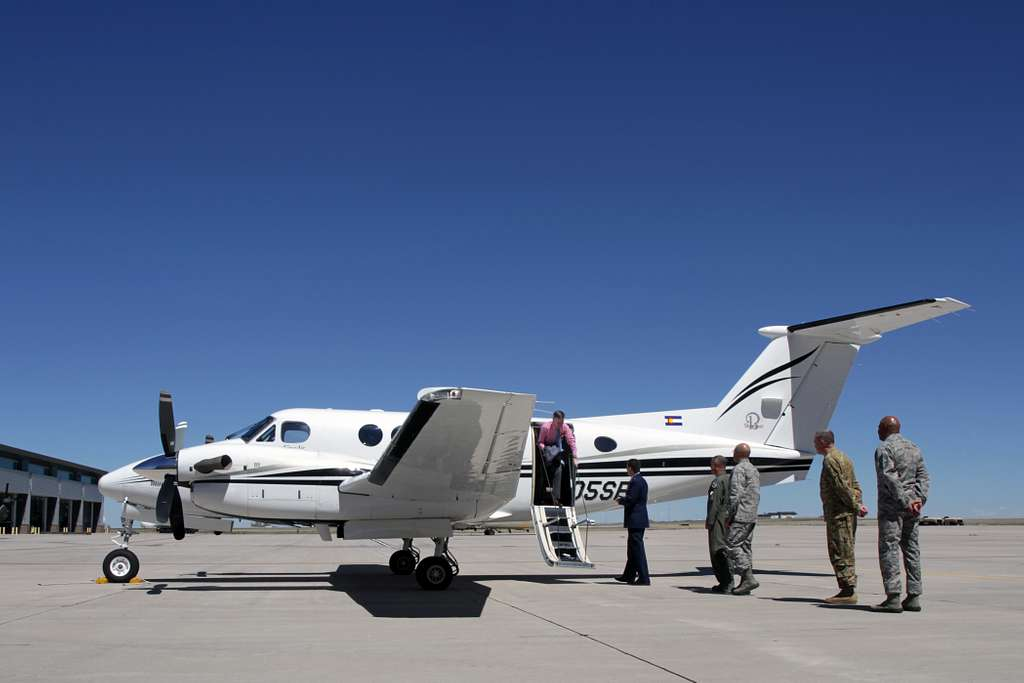
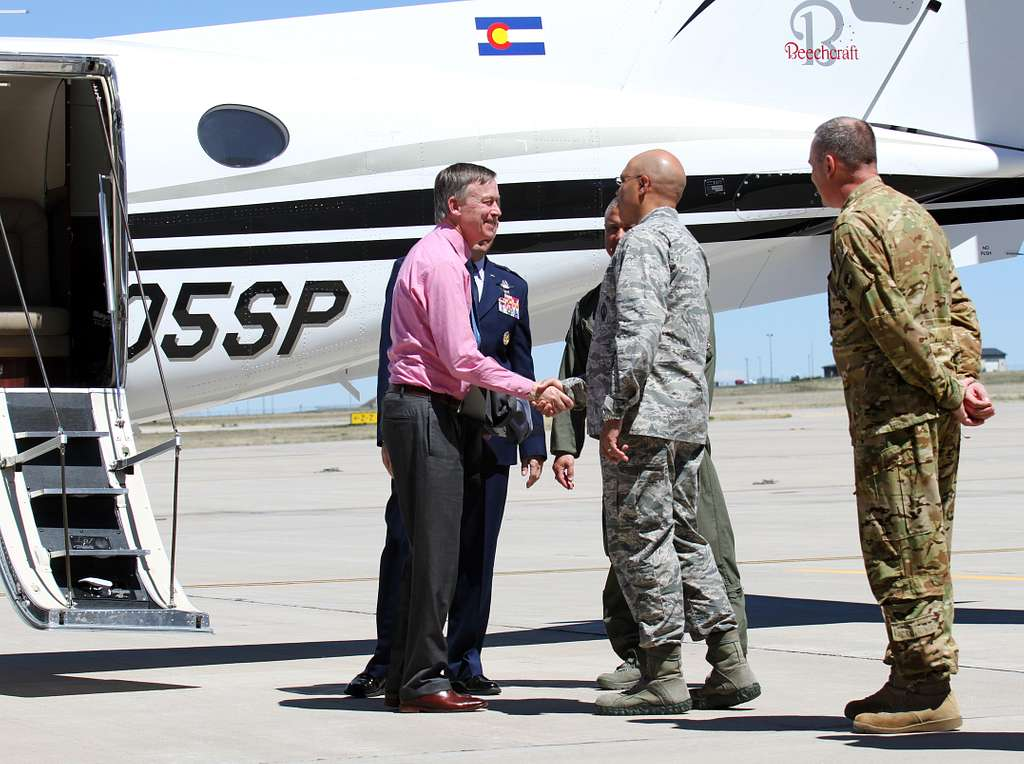
Governor John Hickenlooper arriving at Buckley Air Force Base in 2017 on a Colorado State Patrol aircraft

The Colorado State Patrol operates a Beechcraft King Air B200 plane that is available for use by any state agency. It is mostly used by the Governor's Office and to transport prisoners across the mountainous state.

== Delaware ==
The Delaware State Police Aviation Unit operates helicopters which per Delaware State Code may be used by the Governor or certain other cabinet officials during an emergency for surveying damage – unless it is in use for an emergency mission.

== Florida ==
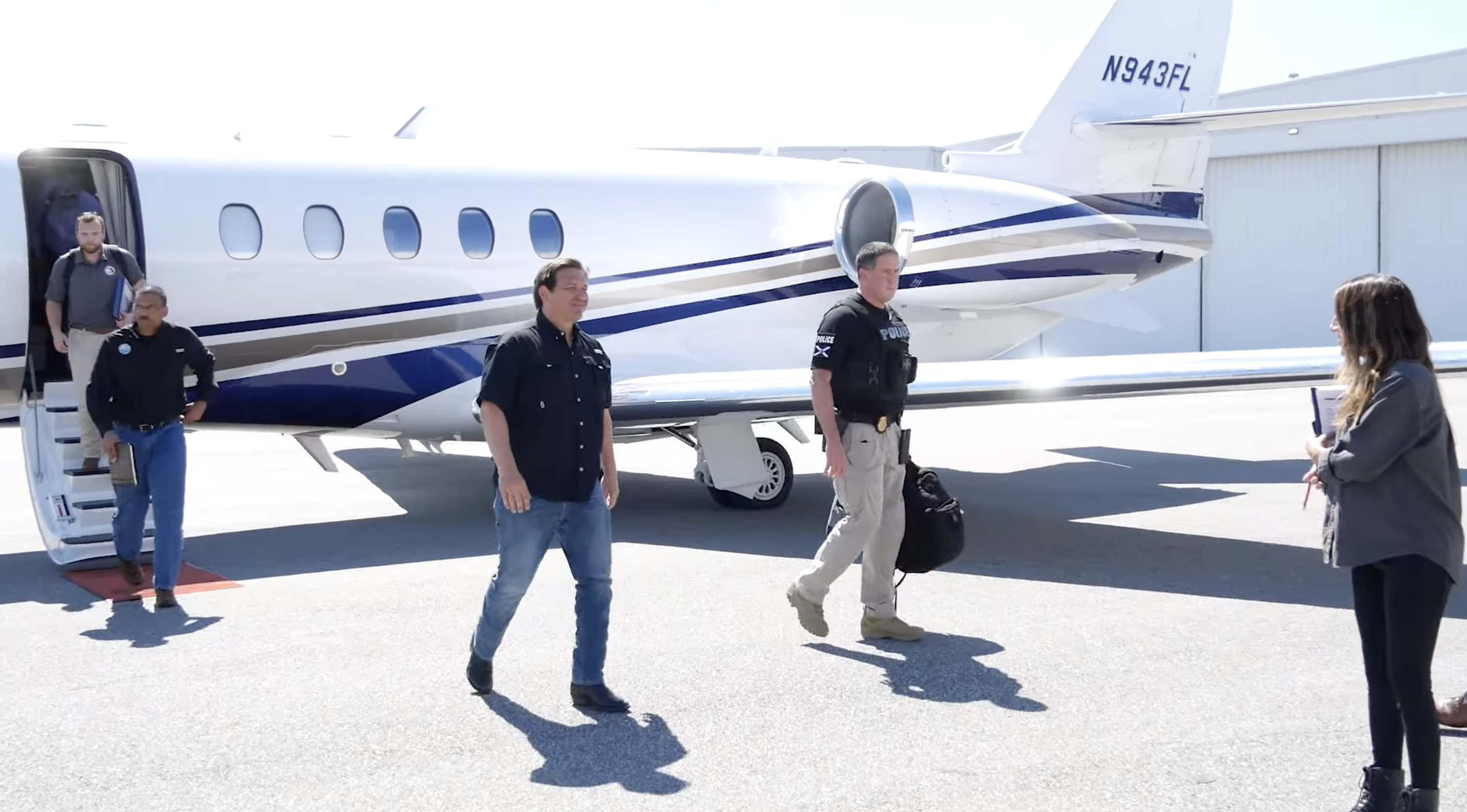
Gov. Ron DeSantis arriving in Volusia County on the DFLE Cessna Citation Latitude to tour storm damage in 2022.

The Florida Department of Law Enforcement (FDLE) currently operates a Cessna Citation Latitude which was acquired in 2020. Previously, the FDLE operated a refurbished Beechcraft King Air which was purchased from the federal government as a surplus. In a January 2019 incident, this King Air had to make an emergency landing while Governor Ron DeSantis and Attorney General Ashley Moody were aboard. The previous government airplane was sold in 2002 by Governor Rick Scott as he utilized his own private jet.

In 2022, Senate Bill 2512 proposed that the state develop a new executive fleet: Aircraft 1 would be for exclusive use by the Governor, Aircraft 2 would be available to the Lieutenant Governor, cabinet members, Chief Justice and Justices of the Florida Supreme Court, and Aircraft 3 would be for use by the Florida Senate President or Speaker of the House, along with other high level executive branch departments and select public commission chairs.

The bill made it through both the houses of the Florida Legislature, however was ultimately vetoed by the Governor.

== Georgia ==
The Georgia Aviation Authority was created in 2009 to manage state aviation assets, including about 85 aircraft used for executive travel as well as law enforcement, forestry, and other purposes. Governor Sonny Purdue was an avid aviator being certified to fly both fixed-wing aircraft and helicopters. While governor, he often also served as the copilot for the state Beechcraft King Air plane when using it. Currently, the Governor, Lieutenant Governor, and Secretary of State are able to reserve state aircraft for travel.

== Idaho ==
The Idaho Transportation Department Division of Aeronautics operates a fleet of aircraft that can be reserved by government officials and also is used for other tasks like search and rescue. The fleet consists of a King Air 200 turboprop, Cessna 182 3-passenger plane, and a Cessna 206 5-passenger plane. A 2018 Quest Kodiak 100 was added to the fleet for added capability to land at shorter runways in rural locations of the state.

== Illinois ==
Governor JB Pritzker frequently charters private jets for out-of-state travel for his staff and himself. For instance, in February 2019, Governor Pritzker flew from Chicago Executive Airport to Washington Dulles Airport aboard a Gulfstream G200 private jet. Governor Bruce Rauner in a bid to cut state spending, grounded the state fleet in 2015 that was formerly used to transport officials.

== Indiana ==
The state owned a 2001 Beechcraft Super King Air B200 which was sold in 2014 with funds going to support the Indiana State Police.

== Iowa ==
Iowa Governor Kim Reynolds has faced criticism for using a private plane provided by a donor to attend events like the 2017 Liberty Bowl. Concerns were raised that this violated ethics laws that forbid state officials from receiving gifts.

== Kansas ==
The Kansas Highway Patrol Air Support Unit maintains the State of Kansas Executive Aircraft. This Raytheon King Air 350 plane is used to transport the governor and other cabinet officials.

== Kentucky ==
The Kentucky State Police (KSP) purchased in 2024 a Super King Air 300 to transport the executive branch officials replacing the aging fleet of a Beechcraft King Air 200 and a Learjet. The King Air 200 was one of the oldest of its model still in operation in the United States and was facing mechanical issues. Besides its use for executive transport, the planes are also used for prisoner transport, law enforcement, disaster response, honor guard use for funerals, and by the Cabinet for Economic Development. Before the Super King Air 300 was purchased, Governor Andy Beshear utilized KSP helicopters and an aircraft from the Kentucky Transportation Cabinet to travel for official duties in the meantime. The Governor's office posts flight logs on its website.

== Louisiana ==
In 2024, the Louisiana State Police purchased a Pilatus PC-12 to transport the governor and other police-related operations. Previously, the Governor traveled around the state on helicopters operated by the Louisiana State Police, with out-of-state travel either utilizing commercial airplanes or private aircraft chartered by donors. A recent law was passed by the Legislature to make the Governor's flight logs harder to access by the public.

== Maryland ==
The Maryland Department of State Police Aviation Command operates a fleet of 10 Leonardo AW-139 helicopters and one fixed-wing Piper Saratoga aircraft which are used for a variety of cases. The state formerly also operated a King Air 350 which was purchased in 2001 to transport state executives, however this aircraft appears to have been retired from use.

== Michigan ==
Michigan Department of Transportation Office of Aeronautics Air Transport Unit operates a fleet of five aircraft for use by state officials and agencies. This consists of two 9-seater Beechcraft King Air 200s, two 5-seater Beechcraft Baron 58s, and one Cessna 206.

== Minnesota ==
The Minnesota Department of Transportation Aeronautics Services operates two Beechcraft King Airs that are available MnDOT employees along with constitutional officers and the Legislature for official business. One of the aircraft can seat eight passengers, and the other can hold five.

== Mississippi ==
Mississippi Department of Finance and Administration's Office of Air Transport Services (OATS) operates a Beechcraft King Air 350 for state executives and other state agencies use. Priority to reserve the plane is given first to the Governor, and then to Lieutenant Governor, followed by other statewide elected officials, then to the Mississippi Development Authority, and all other state agencies.

== Missouri ==
The Missouri State Highway Patrol Aircraft Division operates a Beechcraft King Air 250 as part of its fleet that is used to transport elected and appointed officials alongside its use for law enforcement activities. Its fleet also includes three helicopters and five Cessna fixed-wing aircraft. The state's fleet also included a Beechcraft King Air C90 that was sold in 2017. Governor Eric Greitens committed at the start of his term to not using state aircraft as a campaign promise and has mostly used commercial flights or private aircraft during his tenure.

== Montana ==
The state government of Montana operated a 1989 Beechcraft King Air for executive transport, however, Governor Greg Gianforte cut its operating budget when he became governor in 2021. Governor Gianforte has used a Pilatus Aircraft PC-12/47E aircraft while on official travel, which is owned by Bozeman Technology Incubator, Inc. – a company held by the Governor and his wife. Governor Gianforte holds private liability insurance for the aircraft, however the state's self-insurance plan also covers the airplane while being used for official business.

== Nebraska ==
The Nebraska Department of Transportation Department of Aeronautics operates a Beechcraft King Air C90GTx that was purchased in 2014 to replace the aging prior aircraft. The plane is available for use by not just the Governor but also other state agencies including the public universities and colleges and other government boards and commissions. NDOT publishes flight logs which detail which agency was using the plane and what was the official purpose of the trip.

== Nevada ==
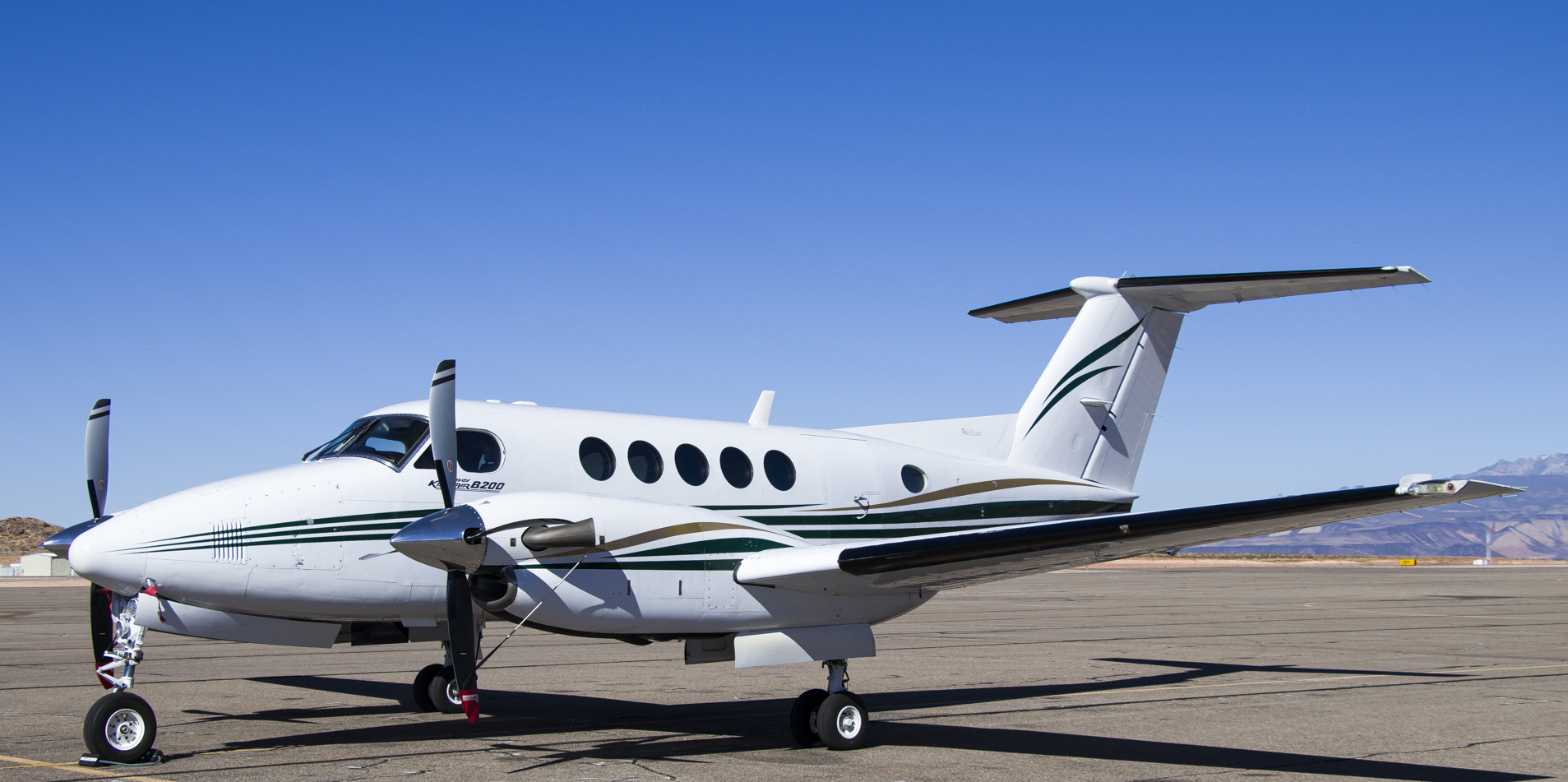
The Nevada Department of Transportation's King Air 350 on the tarmac at St. George Regional Airport in Utah

In 2021, the Nevada Department of Transportation purchased a Pilatus PC-24 jet and a King Air 350 turboprop to transport NDOT employees and state executives. These planes replaced the aging Cessna Citation 550 II jet and Gulfstream Commander airplanes previously used by the state.

== New Jersey ==
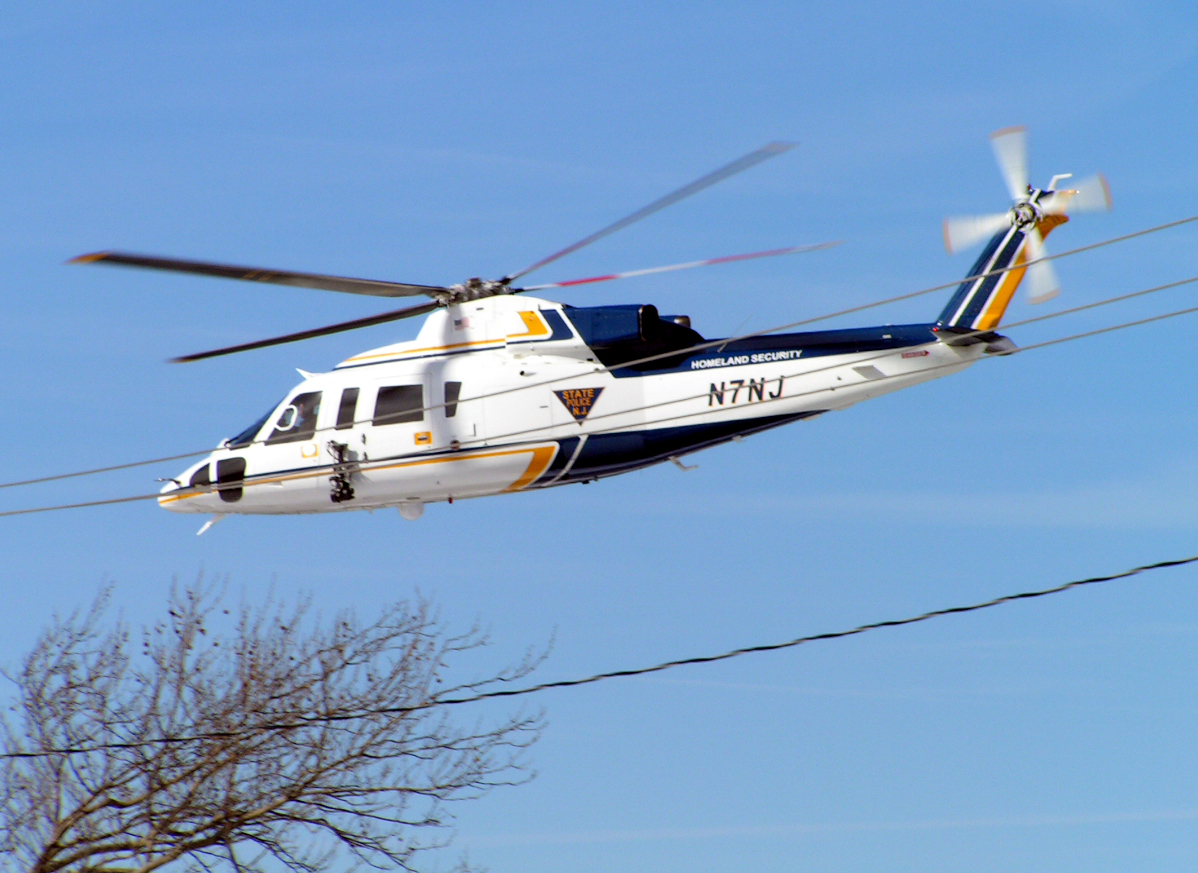
A New Jersey State Police helicopter which is used to transport the Governor

The New Jersey State Police is responsible for protecting the Governor and other key state leaders. The NJSP has used its helicopter fleet to transport the Governor within the state or to nearby destinations like New York City or Washington, DC. By flying into New York City, the State Police avoids having to shut down the Lincoln Tunnel for his vehicle.

The New Jersey State Police has a fleet of eight helicopters in its Aviation Bureau. This consists of five Agusta AW139s, two Bell 206 Long Rangers, and one OH-58 helicopter that was obtained via a military surplus program.

Governor Chris Christie came under controversy for his use of the State Police helicopters for personal trips during his term.

== New Mexico ==
The New Mexico General Services Department Transportation Services Division has an Aviation Services Bureau that operates a Beechcraft King Air C90. This six-passenger turboprop airplane is used by the Governor, but also other state agencies. Notably, the Aviation Services Bureau touts that it is used by Health Department's Children's Medical Services and also transports students of the New Mexico School for the Blind and Visually Impaired.

Previously, the state owned and operated several aircraft that were sold under Governor Susana Martinez as part of budget trimming policy. The state is currently looking into options for a new aircraft to increase capacity as the Aviation Services Bureau serves all state agencies.

== New York ==
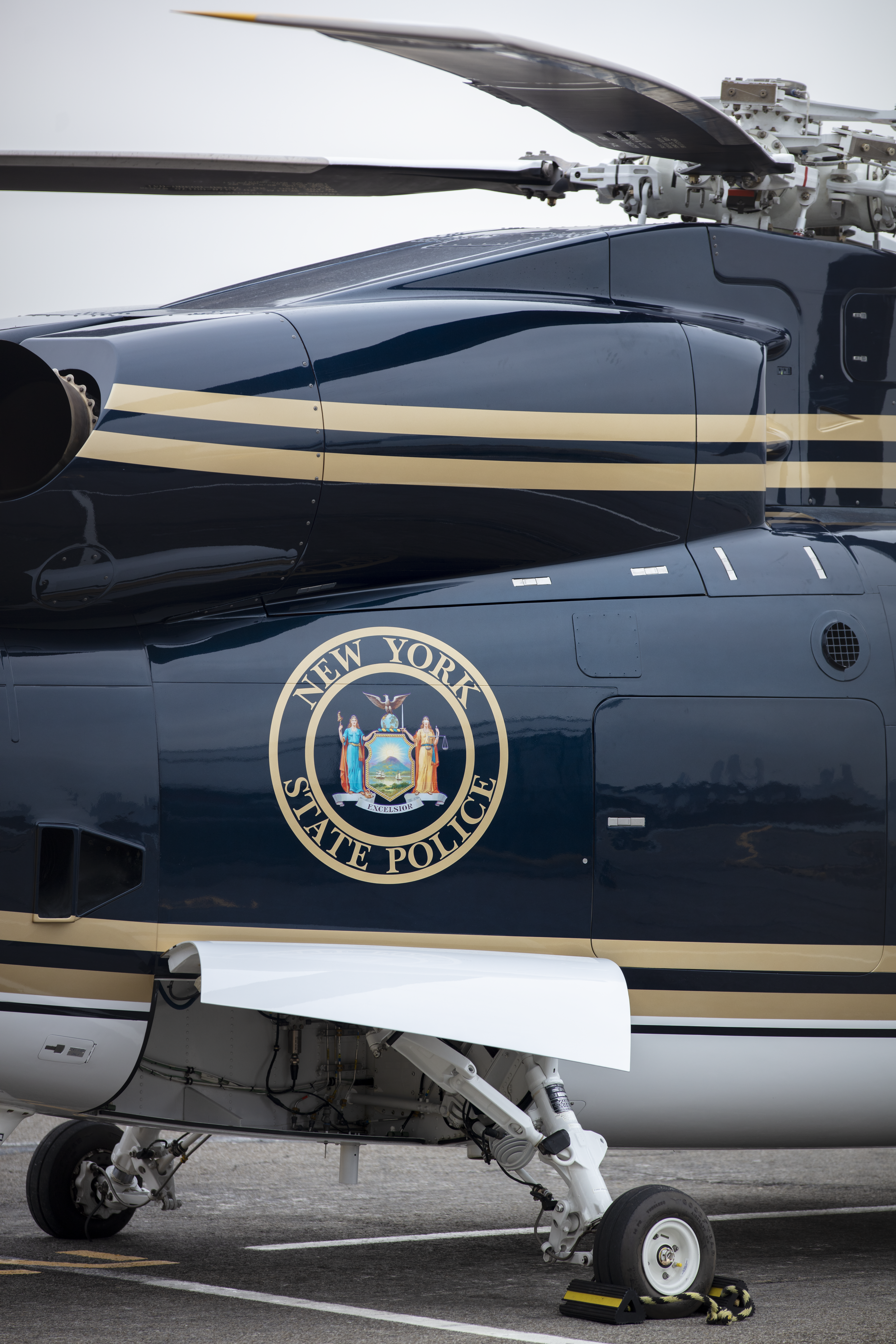
A New York State Police Sikorsky S-76 which is used to transport the Governor.

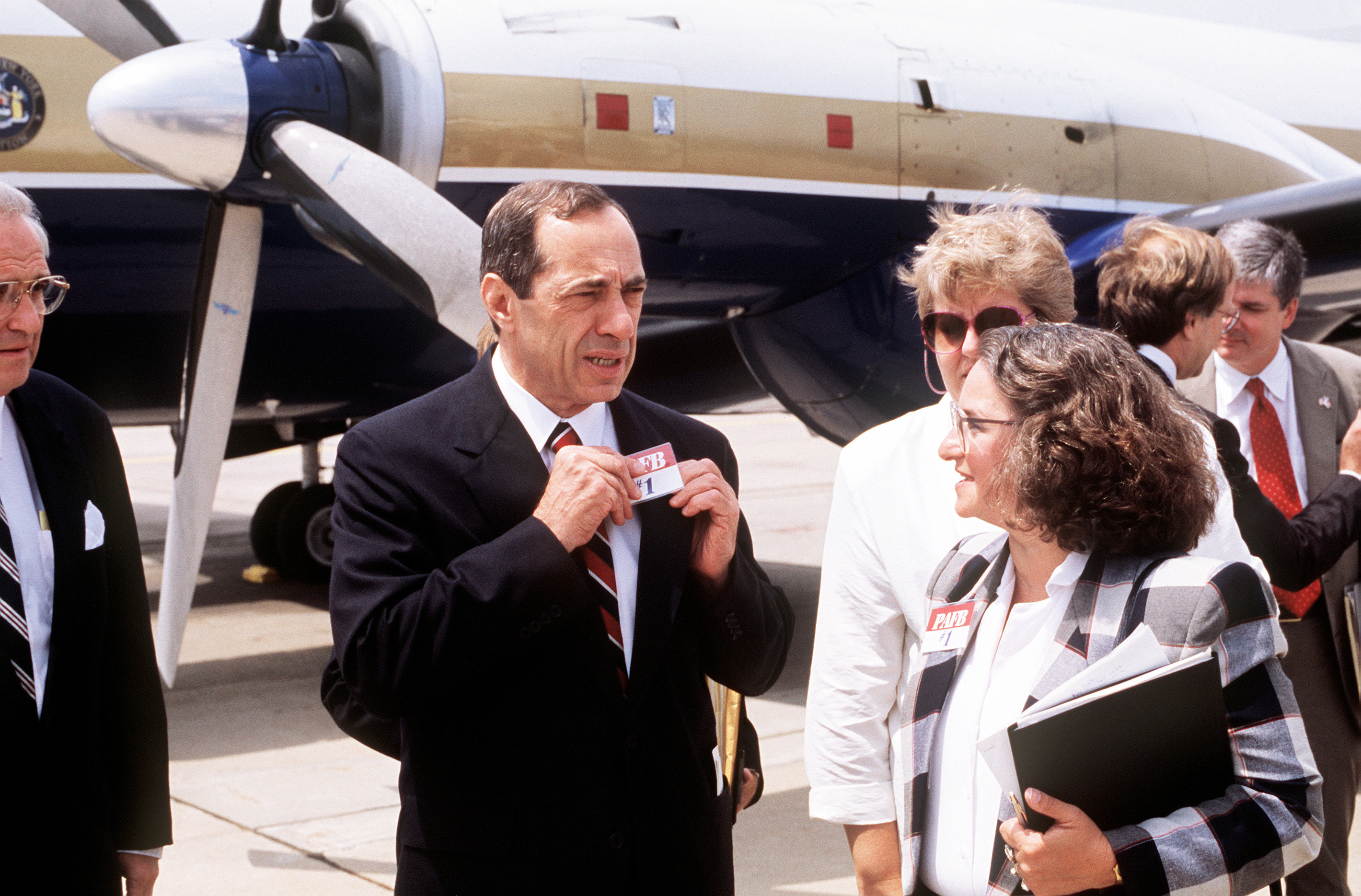
Governor Mario Cuomo arriving at Plattsburgh Air Force Base on a state aircraft in 1991

The New York State Police typically transports the Governor on official business using a King Air B200 turboprop, a Bell 430 helicopter, or a Sikorsky S-76 helicopter. Governor Hochul has also frequently chartered private jets for personal and political travel funded by her campaign committee.

== North Carolina ==
The North Carolina Department of Transportation Division of Aviation operates a King Air 200 turboprop and a Cessna Citation II jet.

== North Dakota ==
The North Dakota Department of Transportation has a fleet of three aircraft which includes two Beechcraft King Air B200 turboprops. NDDOT is currently seeking to replace the two King Air planes due to safety and maintenance concerns. A major concern is that the King Air planes is capable of landing on the runways of just over half of Montana's airports, whereas many modern jets can access the rest of the runways.

== Ohio ==
The Ohio Department of Transportation operates aircraft that are used to transport the Governor, Lieutenant Governor, and for other state agency use. ODOT operates a Beechcraft King Air 350i and King Air 250 out of the Ohio State University Airport in Columbus.

== Oklahoma ==
The Oklahoma Department of Transportation operates a 1992 Beechcraft King Air that is currently used to transport the Governor. In the past, Oklahoma Department of Public Safety, which is responsible for protecting and transporting the Governor, had a plane of its own. However, the DPS plane was sold during Governor Kevin Stitt's first term. Governor Stitt has come under scrutiny for using the ODOT airplane for various out-of-state trips with dubious official use purposes.

== Oregon ==
The Governor of Oregon does not have a designated state plane.

Governor Kate Brown ran into some controversy in 2019 when she flew to Oregon Forest Resources Institute meeting on a private aircraft sponsored by the trade association. Republicans in the Legislature called her out for climate hypocrisy, whereas the Governor's office replied that it was done to fit busy schedule and that the Governor does not frequently use private air travel.

Notably, sitting Governor Earl Snell was killed in a 1947 plane crash along with two other prominent state leaders. This flight was in a private Beechcraft Bonanza airplane on a leisure hunting trip, not a government-operated aircraft.

== Pennsylvania ==
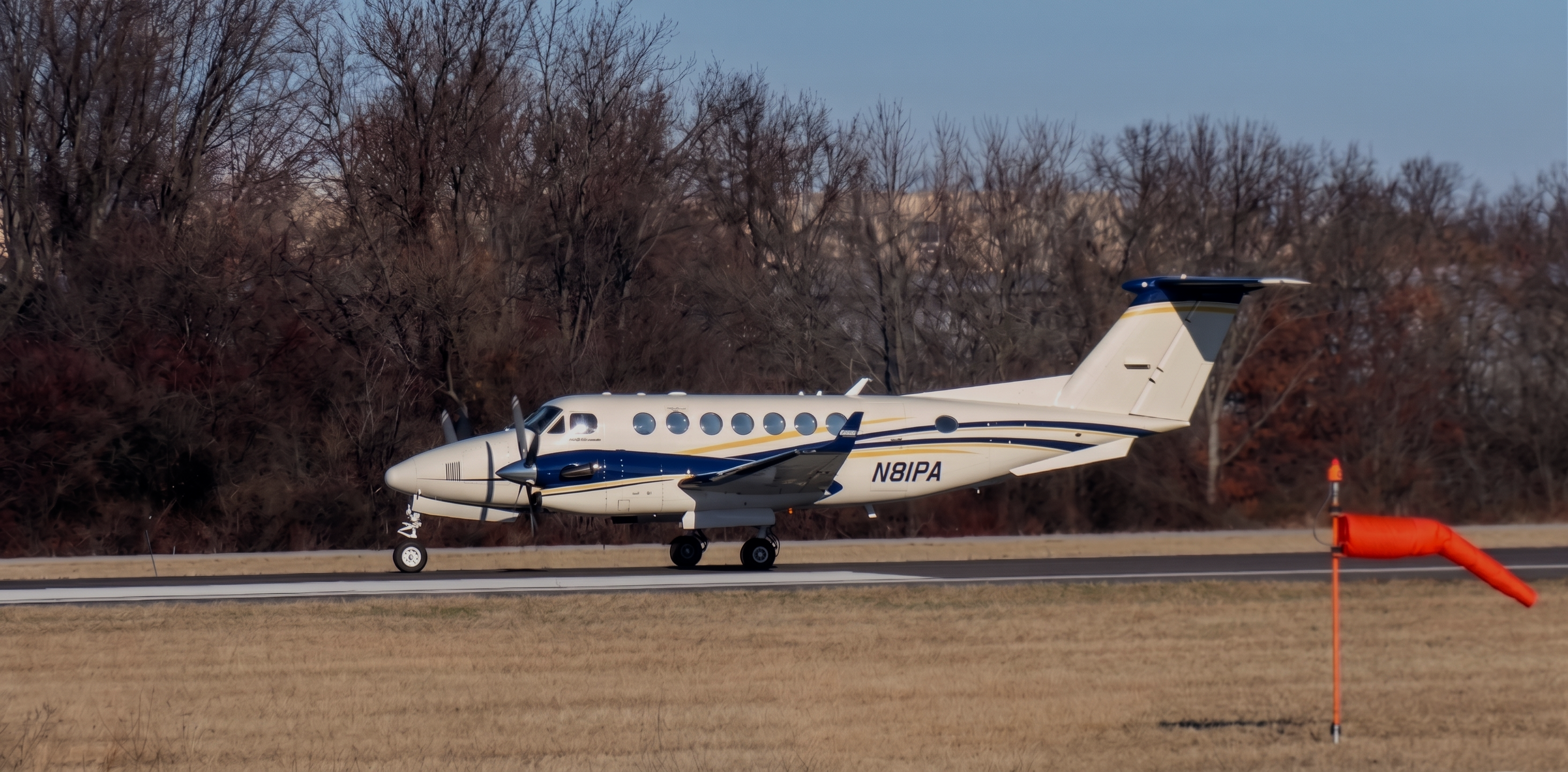
N81PA, the PennDOT-operated 1999 Beechcraft Super King Air 350, on departure from Northeast Philadelphia Airport in 2022.

The Pennsylvania Department of Transportation operates an eight-seat Beechcraft King Air 350i that is kept in a hangar at the Capital City Airport, located across the Susquehanna River from Harrisburg. Priority to use the aircraft goes to the Governor, followed by the Lieutenant Governor, statewide elected officials, cabinet members and senior staff, board and commission chair, and legislative leadership. The aircraft's use policy states that it can be used when commercial flights aren't available or would not accommodate schedule time constraints in conducting official business. They can also be used when called for due to security concerns or in emergencies, but cannot be used to commute.

When Governor Josh Shapiro was called out for using the state aircraft more than his predecessor – including in August 2023 to ferry him away from his vacation in Hilton Head to funeral and then back – his spokesperson stated that "Pennsylvanians expect their Governor to be out in their communities listening, learning, and delivering — not just sitting behind a desk in Harrisburg, and that's why Governor Shapiro has always kept an aggressive and rigorous travel schedule that has taken him to every county in our Commonwealth several times over."

The Governor and other state officials also use N878ST, a Beechcraft King Air aircraft that is owned by the Pennsylvania State Police.

== South Carolina ==
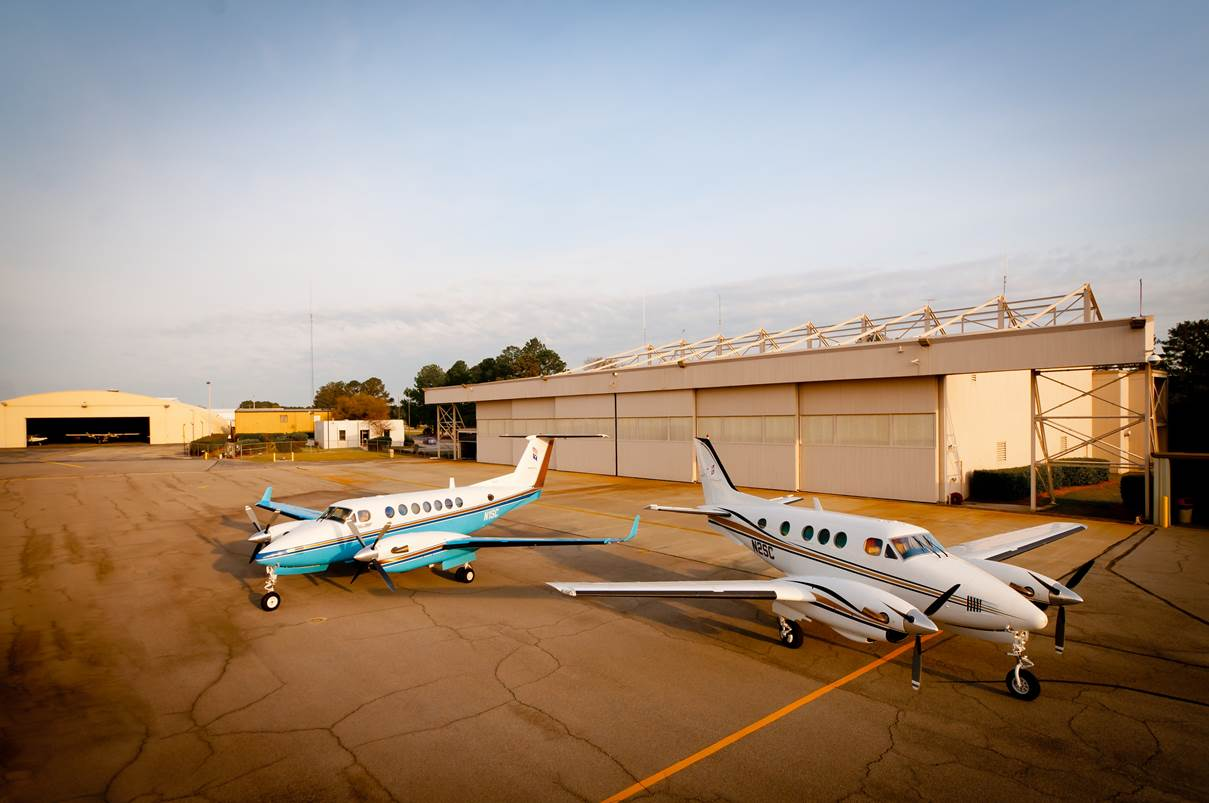
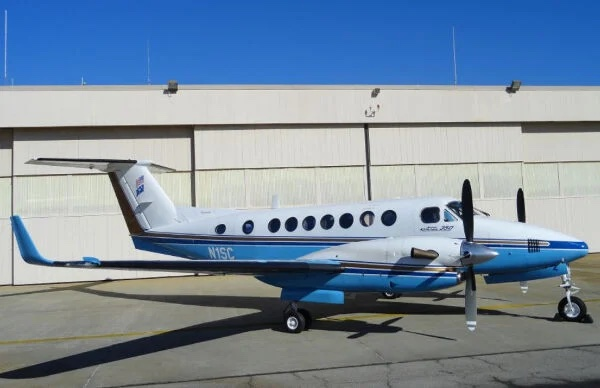
The two planes of the South Carolina Aeronautics Commission on display on a tarmac: a 1990 King Air 350 (top right and bottom, registration N1SC) and a 1983 King Air C90 (top left, registration N2SC).

The South Carolina Aeronautics Commission operates a 1990 King Air 350 and a King Air C90 from the 80s. The plane is available to state agencies with Clemson University being the top user in 2022, followed by the Governor's office. Due to maintenance issues with the current planes, the state is currently shopping for replacements.

== South Dakota ==
The South Dakota Department of Transportation purchased a 2015 King Air 350 in 2022 to serve the state's government. This plane replaced a King Air 200 and King Air 90 that were sold to raise funds for the new plane's purchase.

Bill Janklow bought a helicopter while he was serving as the state's Attorney General in the 1970s. When he came under fire for wasting state funds, he stated that the purchase came out to about 2¢ per resident of the state. Furthermore, he offered to refund the 2¢ to any resident who requested it and paid out around 200 claims. When Janklow later served as Governor, he was called out for using state highway funds to purchase an airplane without the Legislature's permission.

In 1993, Governor George S. Mickelson along with seven other people died in a plane crash. The plane was a state-owned Mitsubishi MU-2 turboprop and was returning from a meeting with John Morrell & Co. on an economic development mission to keep its meatpacking factories in Sioux Falls open.

Governor Mike Rounds came under scrutiny during his term for using the state airplane to fly to his son's basketball games. Governor Rounds was a pilot and sometimes flew the plane himself. He responded to the criticisms by saying he reimbursed the costs for these flights using political contributions. In response to this controversy, a 2006 ballot measure was passed that limited the use of state planes for official business.

== Tennessee ==
The Tennessee Department of Transportation's Aeronautics Division, Flight Services Section is responsible for maintaining and operating the state's 2007 King Air 350 aircraft. The aircraft is available to be scheduled by the Governor, followed in priority by the Governor's Cabinet, "industrial development and recruitment activities", and then other official uses.

== Texas ==
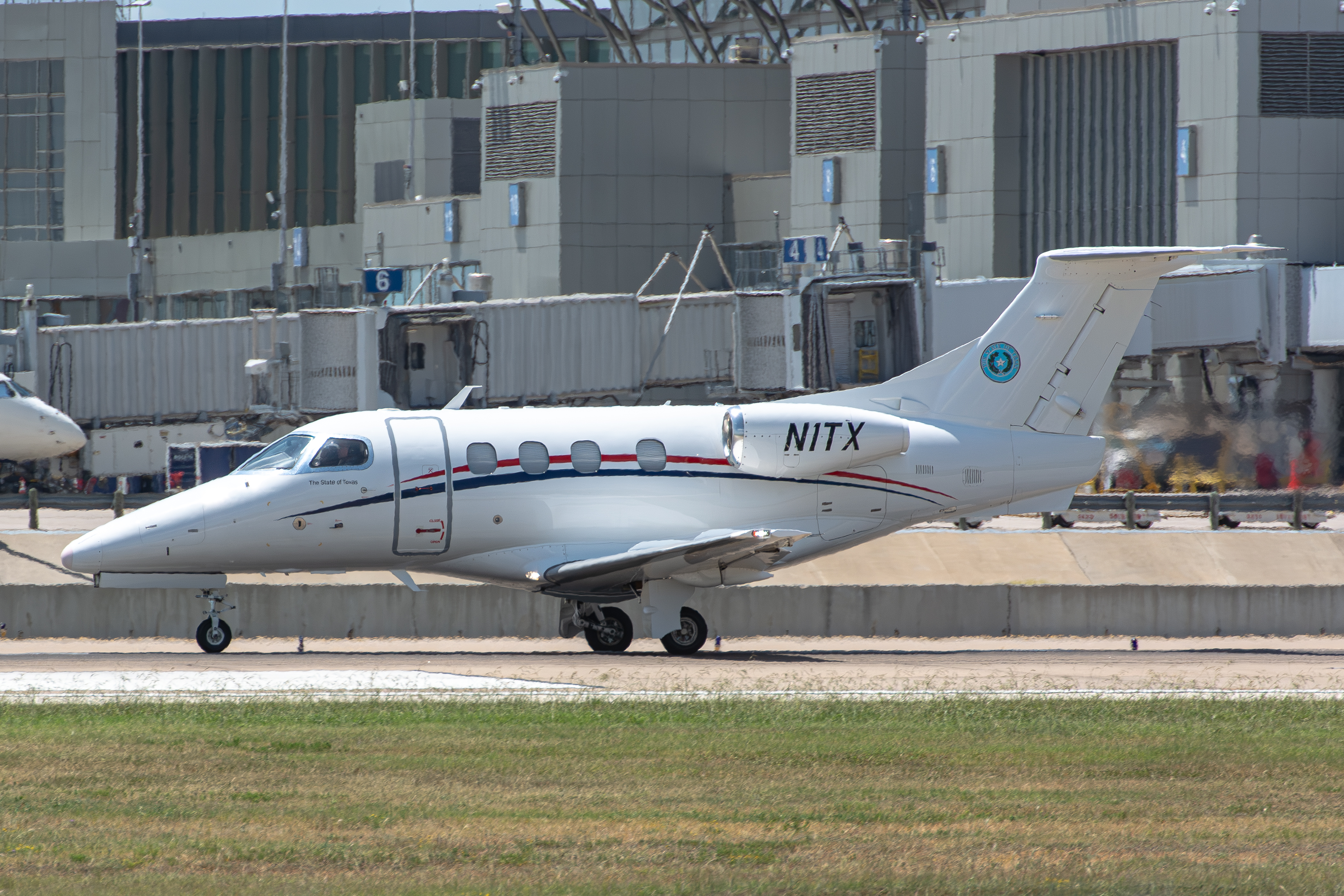
N1TX, a Embraer EMB-500 Phenom operated by the Texas Department of Transportation, seen at Austin Bergstrom International Airport in 2025.

The Texas Department of Transportation Government Flight Services operates aircraft to transport government officials. The main airplane used is an Embraer EMB-500 jet that can seat 5 passengers. State officials from the Governor to the Senator and even state university regents have used the state aircraft to commute and it is sometimes viewed as a perk of public office.

== Utah ==
The Utah Department of Transportation Aeronautics Division has two airplanes in its fleet: A King Air C90 and a King Air B200. These aircraft are available for use to any state agency at a subsidized price.

== Vermont ==
Governor Peter Shumlin commuted to the state capitol from his southern Vermont home in a 1960 single-engined Cessna airplane of the Vermont Agency of Transportation.

== Virginia ==
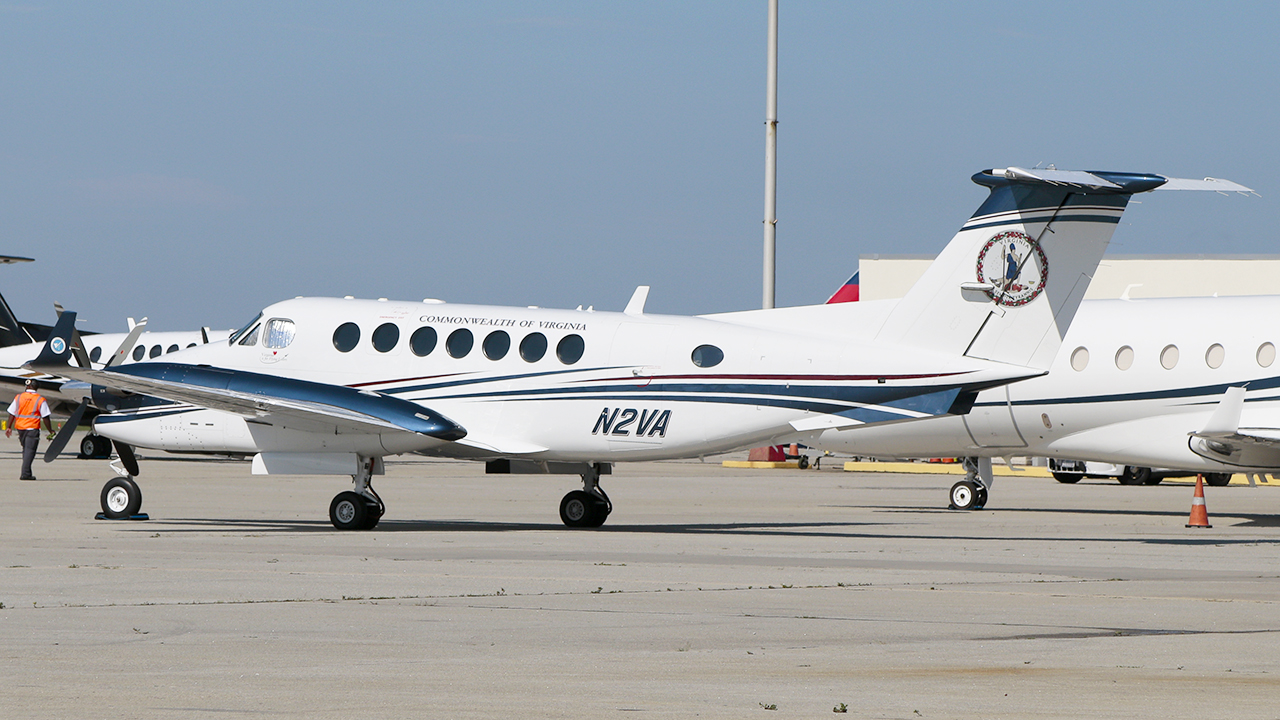
One of the two King Air 350s operated by the Virginia Department of Aviation with the state seal on the tail and "Commonwealth of Virginia" written along the fuselage

The Flight Operations Division of the Virginia Department of Aviation operates a fleet out of Richmond International Airport to serve government agencies and state universities. The fleet consists of two 9-seater King Air 350s, a 4-seater Cessna 206, and a 3-seater Cessna 182. Scheduling priority is given to the Governor and the Virginia Economic Development Partnership.

Virginia governors have also been reported to frequently use private planes provided by their political donors for out-of-state trips. Campaign finance disclosures show Governor Glenn Youngkin has been flown on a private jet provided by Virginia-based tobacco company Altria. Governor Bob McDonnell who faced federal corruption charges also accepted donor-provided flights during his term.

== Washington ==
The Washington State Patrol Aviation Section operates planes out of an Olympia Regional Airport hangar with a fleet of a King Air 200, three Cessna 182s, two Cessna 206s. The WSP uses these aircraft for law enforcement activities but also to transport the Governor. These planes have also been used to transport inmates.

== West Virginia ==
The State of West Virginia Aviation Division operates a fleet that includes a King Air 350 turboprop aircraft, Bell 407 helicopter, Bell 206 LongRanger helicopter, Bell 206 JetRanger helicopter. This fleet is available for official uses to the Governor, as well as state agencies and the legislature, with a mission to "reducing travel time and increasing productivity for the State executives."

West Virginia University, a public state university, contracts with L.J. Aviation to provide charter flights for its staff. While serving as interim secretary for the West Virginia Department of Health and Human Resources, Jeff Coben (who was also serving as the dean of the WVU School of Public Health) frequently flew on private jets chartered by WVU between his Washington, Pennsylvania, home, the university campus in Morgantown, West Virginia, and the state capitol of Charleston. WVU also used its chartered jets to transport its employee Dr. Clay Marsh during his serves as the state's coronavirus czar. WVU has claimed that these flights "were funded through WVU royalty and trademark licensing fees collected by the University," and that "no state appropriations or student tuition or fees are used."

== Wisconsin ==
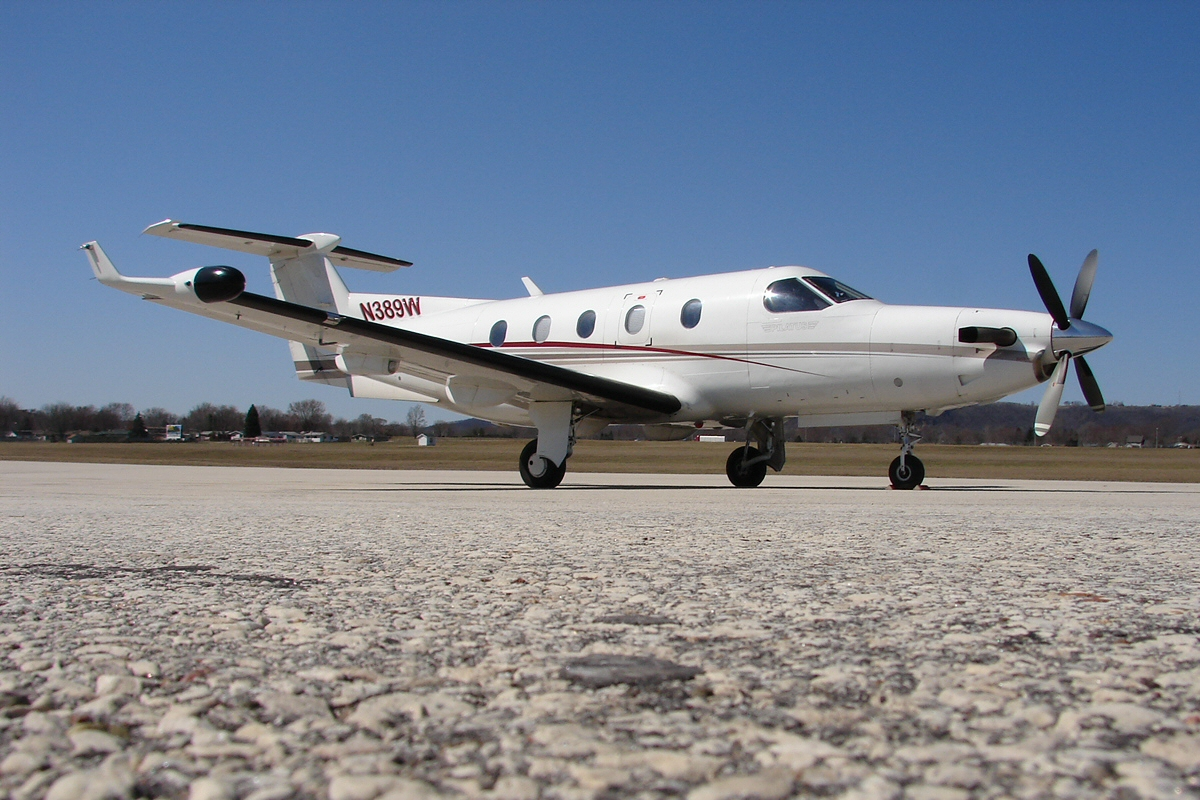
Wisconsin Air Services Pilatus PC-12

The Wisconsin Air Services of Department of Administration operates planes out of Dane County Regional Airport, near the state capitol of Madison, to transport the Governor as well as state officials and employees of state universities. WAS operates a Super King Air 350 that can fit nine passengers and three Pilatus PC-12 that also seat nine.

Governor Walter J. Kohler Sr. was a pilot and during his term in the 1930s he frequently commuted to the state capital on his Mahoney-Ryan-Brougham airplane named the Village of Kohler.

== Wyoming ==
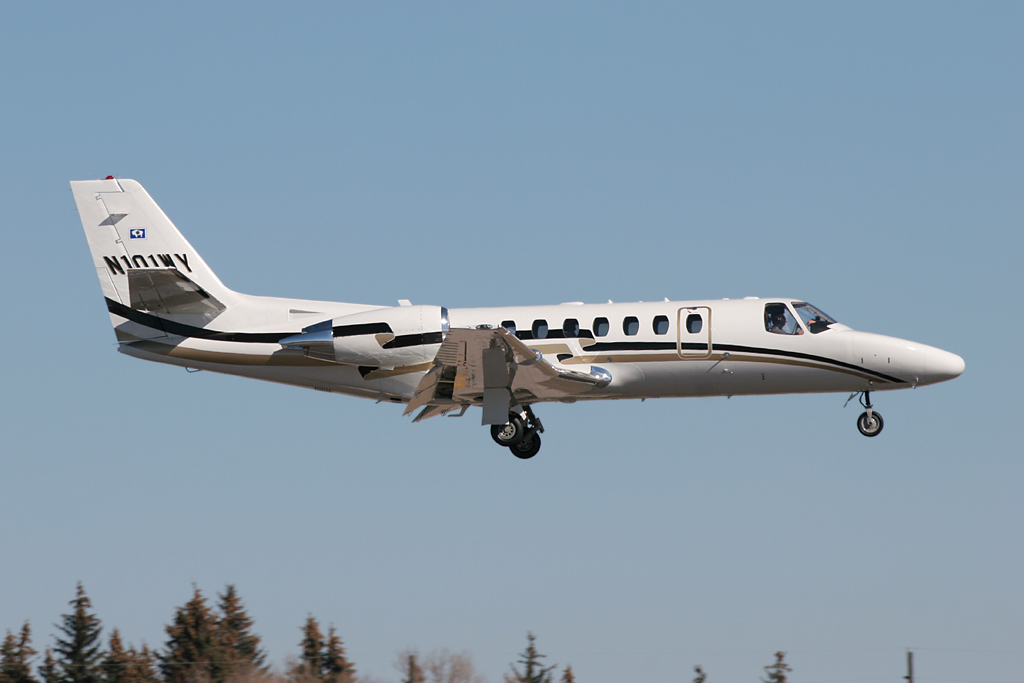
WYDOT Flight Operations Program's Cessna 560 with the state flag on the tail landing at Cheyenne Airport

The Wyoming Department of Transportation Flight Operations Program operates two Cessna Citation Encore jets for passenger transport and manages one Cessna Caravan which is used by WYDOT for aerial photography and surveying. The Flight Operations Program operates out of a hangar at the Cheyenne Regional Airport and offers transportation to state elected officials, state agencies, and members of public boards and commissions. The Cessna Citation Encore jets were purchased in 2002 for $14.6 million in 2002 under Governor Jim Geringer. The state claims they got a good price for the jets due to the dot-com bubble burst. WYDOT also required the planes to meet specific criteria to be able to operate to and from notoriously difficult locations in the state like Dubois Municipal Airport.

In December 1969, then Attorney General James E. Barrett requested to take the state's Cessna 206 single engine airplane to take him to speaking engagement in Riverton. George Keeley who was the Deputy Aeronautics Director and the flight's sole pilot suffered from a stroke and became unable to operate the plane. Barrett did not know how to fly the plane but managed to crash land it in a field and survived with an injury to his eye socket. Keeley did not survive the incident, either succumbing to the stroke or in the crash. After this incident, it became policy to always have two pilots aboard state aircraft.

== Territories ==
=== American Samoa ===
In 2005, the Government of American Somoa purchased a Britten Norman Islander aircraft for around $500,000. The budget justification for the purchase was to provide transportation services in the event that commercial air travel between Manuʻa Islands and Tutuila (the island that includes the capital) became unavailable. The Governor also stated that the aircraft would be used for government purposes.

In 2014, the territorial government had planned to lease the aircraft to a startup airline company by the name of Tausani Airlines to provide inter-island service after a similar deal with another startup Manu'a Airways fell through. However the company never was able to obtain FAA certification to begin operations, leading to an investigatory hearing by the American Samoa Fono on the contract in 2022.

=== Puerto Rico ===
The Governor of Puerto Rico receives a travel reimbursement for air travel.

== See also ==
- Air transports of heads of state and government
- Air Force One
- Governor (United States)
- List of U.S. statewide elected officials
