= Babydog =

English Bulldog owned by Jim Justice (born 2019)

Babydog Justice
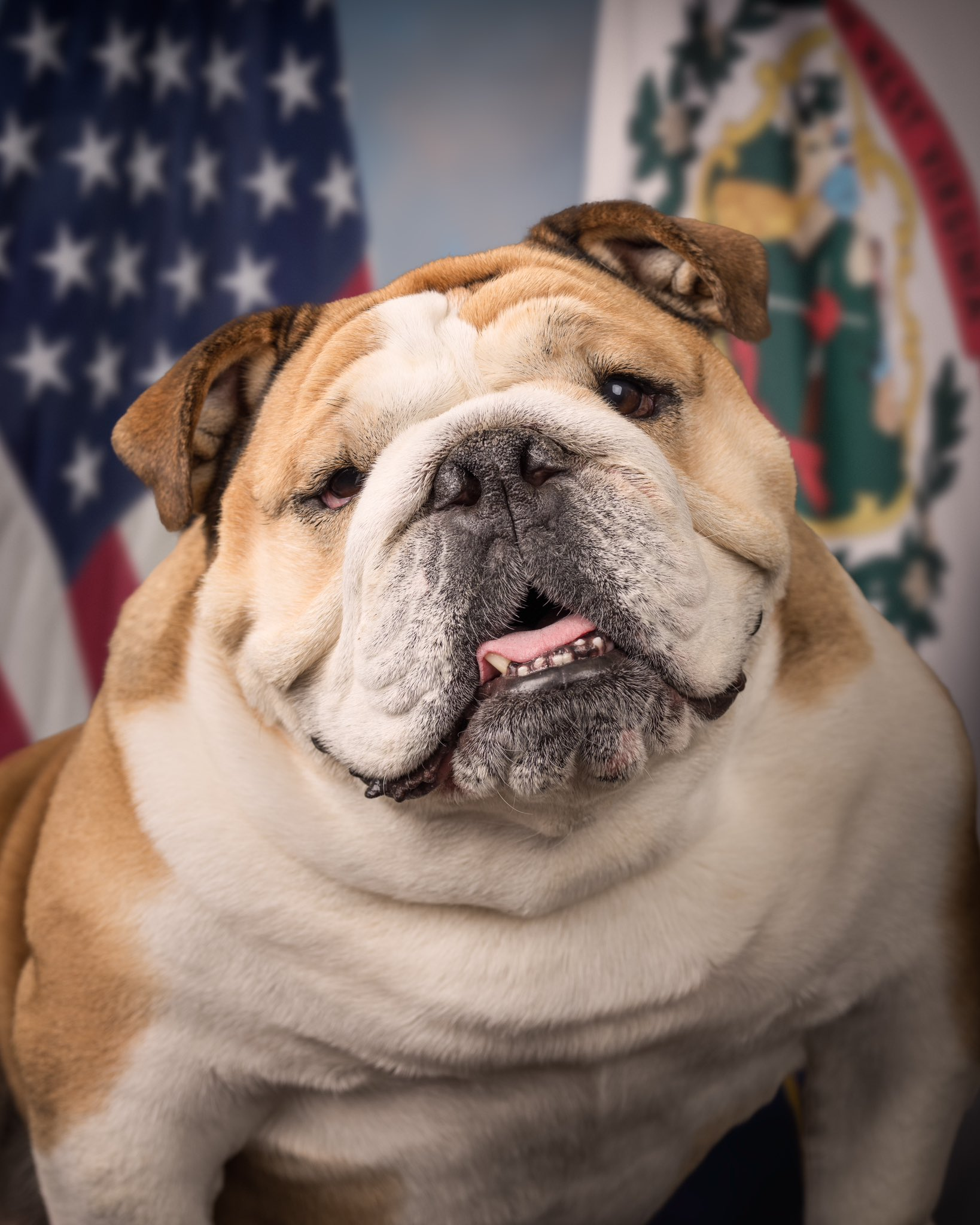
- Official portrait, 2025
- Species: Canis familiaris
- Breed: English Bulldog
- Sex: Female
- Born: October 27, 2019 (age 6); West Virginia, U.S.
- Owner: Jim Justice
- Weight: 60 lb (27 kg)

Babydog Justice (born October 27, 2019) is an English Bulldog owned by current Senator and former Governor Jim Justice of West Virginia. Described by the Washington Post as a "fixture in West Virginia politics", she is known for regularly accompanying Justice at public engagements.

== Personal life ==
Babydog was a gift to Jim Justice from his children in 2019. According to Justice, she got her name as a puppy after Justice's grandson would keep calling her Babydog. The name stuck, giving Babydog her famous name. Justice has described Babydog as a "little rascal who looks like a brown watermelon that loves everybody". She loves chicken nuggets from Wendy's and hates celery.

In February 2024, Babydog successfully underwent ligament surgery. On October 15, 2025, Babydog's sixth birthday was celebrated in the Hart Senate Office Building of the U.S. Senate in spite of a federal government shutdown at the time. The party was attended by fans, journalists, and politicians such as Senators Tommy Tuberville and Chuck Grassley. Cakes and snacks shaped like Babydog were served.

== Life in politics ==
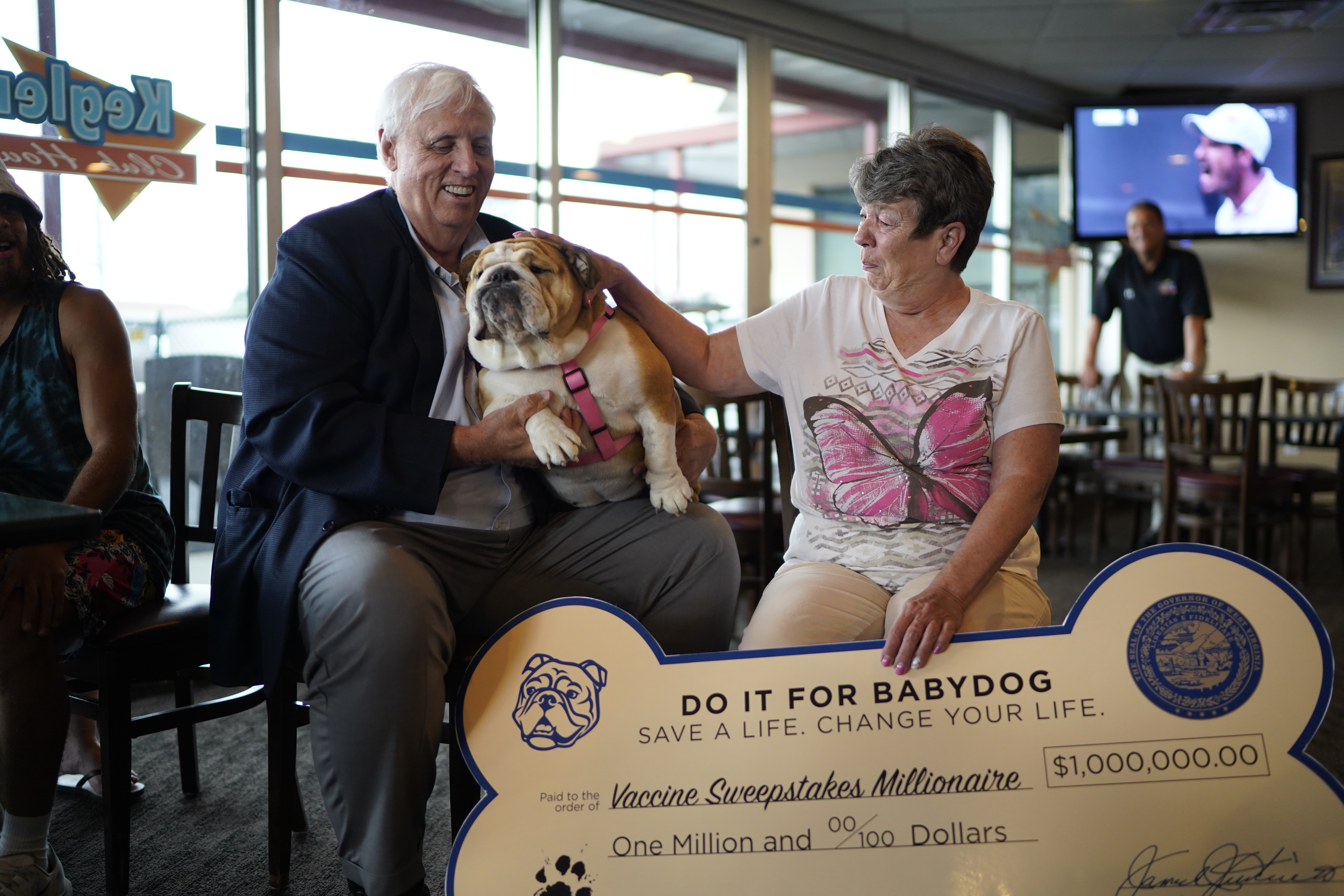
Babydog and Jim Justice presenting a prize to a winner of the "Do It for Babydog" sweepstakes

External videos
- Speech by Justice at the 2024 Republican National Convention featuring Babydog, C-SPAN

During the COVID-19 pandemic in 2021, Justice used the slogan "Do It for Babydog" to promote a vaccine lottery designed to encourage West Virginians to get vaccinated against COVID-19.

Due to Babydog's frequent appearances with Justice at various press conferences and events within West Virginia, Babydog quickly became a popular figure within West Virginian politics. One particular event in 2022 gained national attention: while delivering the annual State of the State Address, Justice responded to a tweet by actress Bette Midler calling West Virginians "poor, illiterate, and strung out" (in response to Senator and former Governor Joe Manchin's opposition to President Joe Biden's Build Back Better Plan) by holding Babydog up and telling Midler, as well as his critics, to "kiss her hiney".

In 2023, a waterfall in Babcock State Park was renamed to "Babydog Falls" in her honor. Additionally, in June 2024, a mural depicting West Virginian history was unveiled at the West Virginia State Capitol, and it included a likeness of Babydog. In August 2024, associates of Jim Justice registered a political action committee named the "Babydog's Almost Heaven PAC".

Babydog appeared with Justice on the second day of the 2024 Republican National Convention, which garnered cheers from attendees. The New York Times reported that her reception had "an energy generally reserved only for former President Donald J. Trump". In November 2024, Babydog was banned from appearing on the floor of the United States Senate because she is not a service dog. In April 2025, Jim Justice shared a testimony to the Senate on behalf of Babydog about the importance of love. Her testimony was admitted to the record without objection.

== See also ==
- List of individual dogs
- United States presidential pets
