= Clay Marsh =

American physician (born 1958)

Clay Braden Marsh (born November 15, 1958) is an American physician, scientist, educator and university administrator. He has been vice president and executive dean for health sciences at West Virginia University since 2015. He is a member of the board of WVU Medicine, West Virginia's largest health care enterprise and largest employer.

== Addressing Opioid and Substance Abuse ==
In January 2019, West Virginia University and California biotech company Gilead Sciences announced HepConnect, a joint effort to combat people infected with hepatitis c virus (HCV), which occurs through sharing of syringes.

In February 2019, Marsh and West Virginia Governor Jim Justice announced a partnership between West Virginia University Medical Center and the West Virginia Department of Health and Human Services to address substance abuse within West Virginia, which has the nation's highest opioid abuse per capita. West Virginia's Berkeley and Jefferson counties account for the highest rate of fatal drug overdoses in the state. West Virginia has been called "the poster child" for our nation's opioid epidemic.

Marsh is studying the impact of social separation and loss of social connection as a root cause of opioid abuse. In October 2017, United States President Donald Trump declared the opioid crisis a nationwide public health emergency.

== Education ==
Marsh earned a bachelor's degree in biology in 1981 and an M.D. in 1985, both at West Virginia University. He completed an internal medicine residency and research fellowship in pulmonary and critical care medicine at Ohio State University.

== Career in academic medicine ==
Marsh was a faculty member and administrator at Ohio State University from 1993 until his appointment at West Virginia University in 2015, serving as senior associate vice president and chief innovation officer of the OSU Wexner Medical Center. Since his arrival at WVU, Marsh has recruited a large number of faculty physicians and researchers to staff the health schools and expanding healthcare network. He oversees five professional schools at the university including dentistry, medicine, nursing, pharmacy and public health as well as statewide allied health programs and clinical operations.

== Research ==
Marsh's research has resulted in over 150 peer-reviewed articles on which he is author or co-author, concentrated in five areas:

- Underlying mechanisms of pulmonary fibrosis and a role for epigenetic regulation, including mechanisms driving idiopathic pulmonary fibrosis (IPF)
- Monocytes/Macrophages regulating tumor microenvironment.
- Extracellular vesicles (EVs) and their role in health and disease.
- Monocyte and macrophage biology.
- Personalized (P4) Medicine.

Much of this research was supported by grants from the National Institutes of Health.
