= Jim Justice =

American businessman and politician (born 1951)

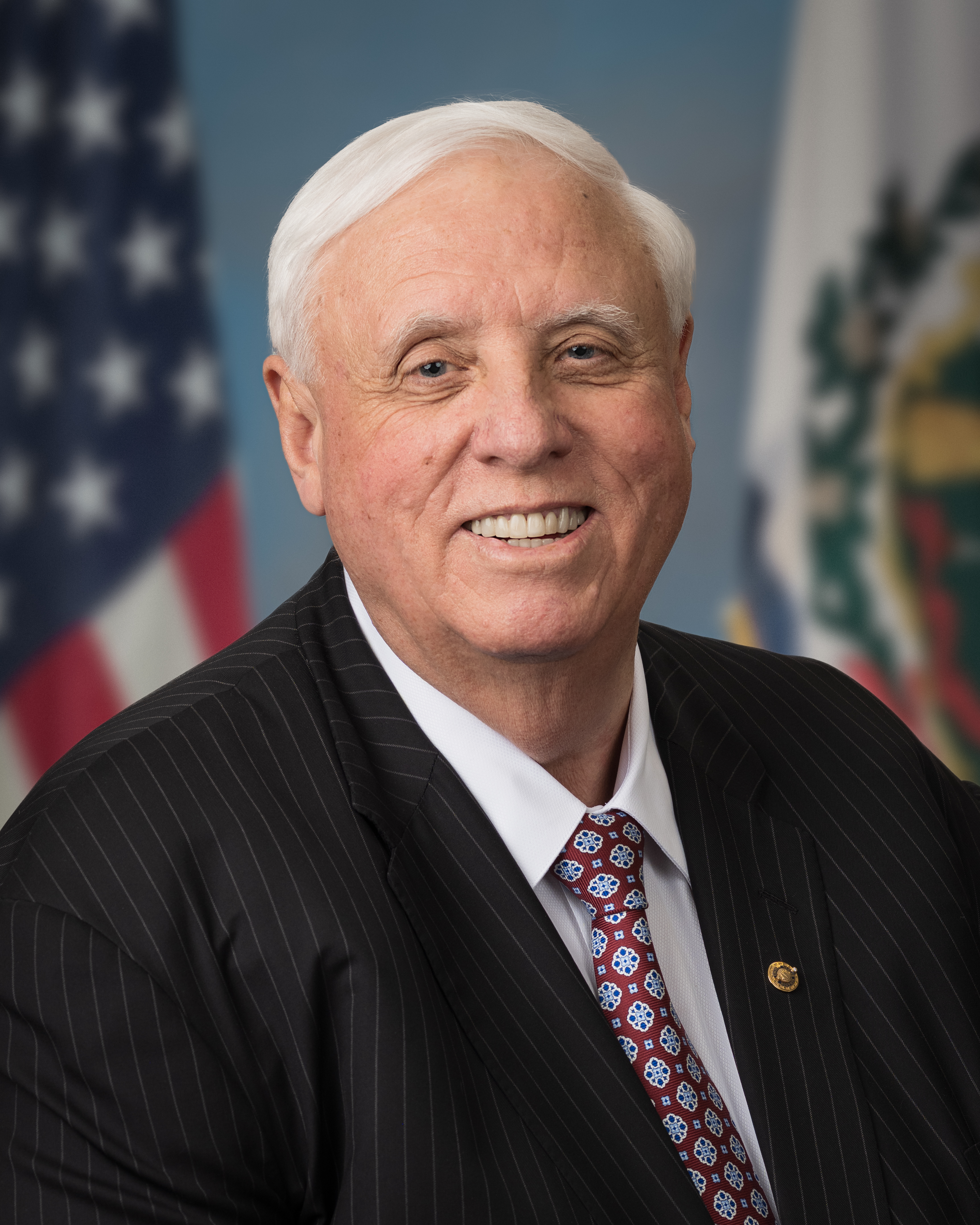
- Official portrait, 2025

United States Senator from West Virginia
- Incumbent
- Assumed office January 14, 2025 Serving with Shelley Moore Capito
- Preceded by: Joe Manchin

36th Governor of West Virginia
- In office January 16, 2017 – January 13, 2025
- Lieutenant: Mitch Carmichael; Craig Blair; Randy Smith
- Preceded by: Earl Ray Tomblin
- Succeeded by: Patrick Morrisey

Personal details
- Born: James Conley Justice II; April 27, 1951 (age 75) Charleston, West Virginia, U.S.
- Party: Independent (before 2011); Democratic (before 2011, 2015–2017); Republican (2011–2015, 2017–present)
- Spouse: Cathy Comer (m. 1975)
- Children: 2
- Education: University of Tennessee (attended); Marshall University (BA, MBA)
- Website: Senate website Campaign website
- Nickname: Big Jim
- Justice's voice Justice marks the 23rd anniversary of the September 11 attacks. Recorded September 11, 2024

James Conley Justice II (born April 27, 1951) is an American politician and businessman serving since 2025 as the junior United States senator from West Virginia. A member of the Republican Party, he served from 2017 to 2025 as the 36th governor of West Virginia. Justice was once a billionaire, but his net worth was estimated at $664.2 million in 2025, making him the richest U.S. senator as of that year. He inherited a coal mining business from his father that included 94 companies. He and his family own the Greenbrier, a luxury resort and National Historic Landmark in White Sulphur Springs.

In 2015, Justice announced his candidacy for governor in 2016. Although a registered Republican before running for governor, he ran as a Democrat and defeated the Republican nominee, Bill Cole. Less than seven months after taking office, Justice switched back to the Republican Party after announcing his plans at a rally with President Donald Trump in the state. He was reelected in 2020.

Justice was elected to the Senate in 2024, winning the seat previously held by Joe Manchin. Defeating U.S. representative Alex Mooney in the primary and the Democratic nominee, former Wheeling mayor Glenn Elliott, in the general election, Justice became the first Republican to win that seat since 1956.

== Early life and education ==
James Conley Justice II was born to James Conley Justice and Edna Ruth (née Perry) Justice in Charleston, West Virginia. He grew up in Raleigh County, West Virginia, graduating from Woodrow Wilson High School in Beckley in 1969. He enrolled at the University of Tennessee on an athletic scholarship for golf but transferred to Marshall University. At Marshall, he was a two-year captain on the Thundering Herd golf team. He earned his bachelor's degree and Master of Business Administration from Marshall.

== Business career ==
After college, Justice went into the family agriculture business. He founded Bluestone Farms in 1977, which now operates 50,000 acres (20,000 ha) of farmland, and is the leading producer of grain on the East Coast of the United States. During that time, he also developed Stoney Brook Plantation, a 15,000-acre hunting and fishing preserve in Monroe County. Justice is a seven-time national corn growing champion. After his father's death in 1993, Justice inherited ownership of Bluestone Industries and Bluestone Coal Corporation. In 2009, he sold some of his coal business to the Russian company Mechel for $568 million. In 2015, after a huge drop in the price of coal led Mechel to close some of the mines, he bought the business back for $5 million. Since buying back the mine from Mechel, Justice reopened several of the mines and hired over 200 miners.

As of 2014, Justice owned 70 active mines in five states. His charitable donations included $25 million to the James C. Justice National Scout Camp at Summit Bechtel Reserve, $5 million to Marshall University, and $10 million to the Cleveland Clinic.

Justice's mining companies have been scrutinized for alleged cases of safety violation and unpaid taxes; in 2016, NPR called him the nation's "top mine safety delinquent". Justice allegedly owed millions of dollars to the government in back taxes and unpaid coal mining fees and fines. Two debt-related lawsuits were settled in 2019, and in 2020 mining companies Justice or his family owned agreed to pay $5 million in delinquent safety fines. Separately, Justice agreed in 2025 to pay $5.2 million in overdue personal income taxes that, according to the Justice Department, originated in 2009.

Before taking office as governor, Justice resigned from all the executive positions he held. He placed his daughter Jill in charge of the Greenbrier and his son Jay in charge of his mining and agriculture businesses. He said he would place all his assets in a blind trust but that the process would take time because of their complexity.

During the 2020 COVID-19 pandemic, Justice and his family's businesses received between $11 million and $24 million in aid from the Paycheck Protection Program. His luxury resort, the Greenbrier Hotel Corporation, received a loan of between $5 million and $10 million. The company did not promise to retain any jobs in exchange for the loan, which the Greenbrier would have to repay if it did not use at least 60% of the funds for payroll.

According to a 2020 ProPublica investigation, Justice had paid more than $128 million in judgments and settlements over his businesses' unpaid bills. In October 2023, a federal court ordered the U.S. Marshals Service to seize and sell a helicopter the company owned to pay an $8 million judgment granted to a creditor.

In October 2021, Forbes estimated Justice's net worth at $513.3 million. By January 2025, Forbes reported that Justice's net worth had fallen below zero due to over $1 billion in debt. Justice serves as the owner or chief executive officer of over 50 companies, including the Greenbrier in White Sulphur Springs, West Virginia, which he bought for $20.5 million in 2009, preventing its bankruptcy.

== Governor of West Virginia ==
=== Elections ===
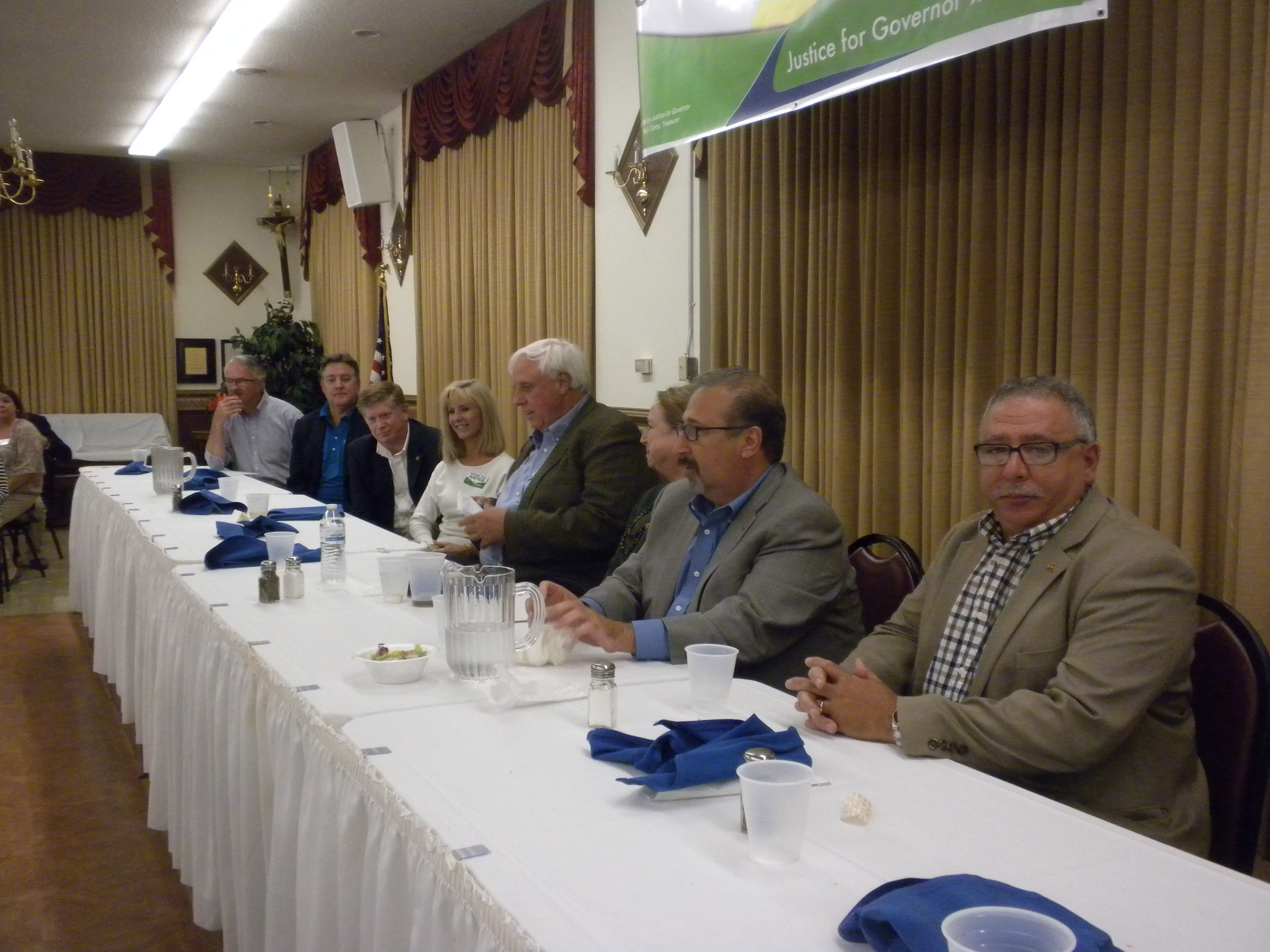
Then-candidate Justice (seated fifth from the left) in Fairmont, West Virginia, in September 2016.

==== 2016 ====
In 2015, Justice declared his candidacy for governor of West Virginia in the 2016 election as a member of the Democratic Party. He had been a registered member of the Republican Party until changing his registration in February 2015. This was his first time running for political office. Justice was endorsed by the United Mine Workers. In May 2016, Justice won the Democratic nomination for governor.

During the general election campaign, Justice campaigned on improving the state's track record on education, encouraging the continued usage of coal, increasing tourism, and tackling the budget deficit and the opioid crisis. He refused to endorse Hillary Clinton, the Democratic nominee in that year's presidential election, citing her stance on phasing out coal energy.

Justice defeated Republican nominee Bill Cole in the November general election.

==== 2020 ====
In January 2019, Justice declared his candidacy for reelection. This time, he ran as a Republican, having changed his party registration after an August 2017 rally with President Donald Trump. He defeated multiple challengers in the Republican primary.

In the general election campaign, Justice focused on his COVID-19 response, the state's budget surplus, and his work on the substance abuse crisis. Several polls had him leading by a large margin over Kanawha County commissioner Ben Salango in the months preceding Election Day. On November 3, 2020, he defeated Salango with over 63% of the vote to Salango's 30%. With his win, he became the first West Virginian Republican gubernatorial candidate to win since Cecil H. Underwood in 1996 and the first GOP incumbent to win a second term since Arch A. Moore Jr. in 1972.

The United Mine Workers endorsed Salango after having endorsed Justice in 2016, but Justice was endorsed by the businessmen's association West Virginia Coal Association, which said he had "worked to protect the miners, increase coal production, and explore innovative ways to use coal for new products and downstream job opportunities".

=== Tenure ===
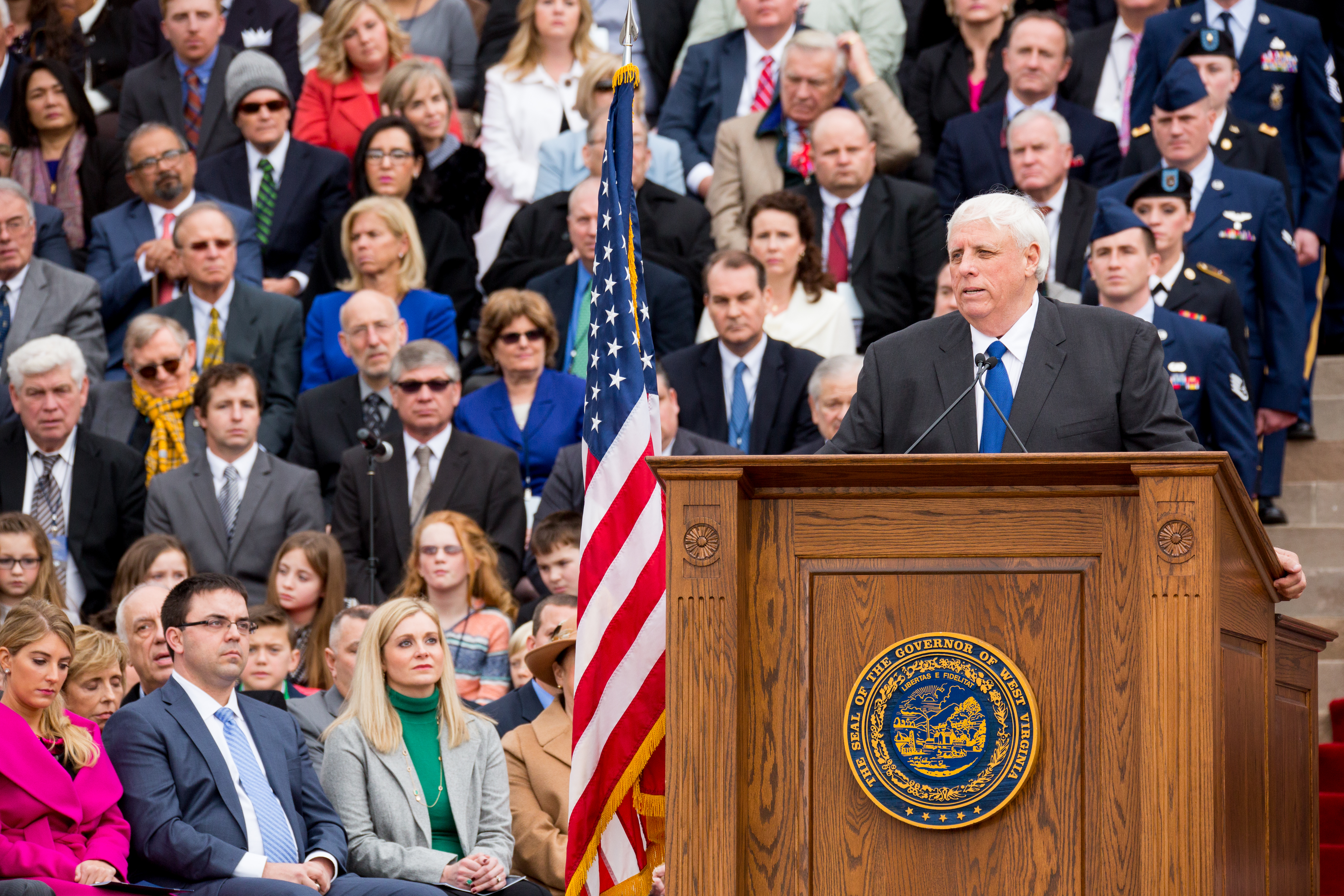
Justice at his inauguration in January 2017.

Justice took office as governor on January 16, 2017. He is known for using colorful metaphors and digs at political opponents.

To improve West Virginia's budget situation, he has proposed raising the state's revenue by $450 million, primarily by increasing the consumer sales taxes, reinstituting the business and occupation (B & O) tax, and establishing a "rich man's" tax. He also opposed plans to cut health and education spending. On April 13, 2017, while vetoing a budget bill passed by the West Virginia legislature, Justice said the bill was "nothing more than a bunch of political you-know-what" and showed a prop featuring cow manure on a print copy of the bill.

On August 3, 2017, Justice announced that he had rejoined the Republican Party. He made the announcement at a rally hosted by President Donald Trump in Huntington and also confirmed his support for Trump. Justice said he was returning to the GOP because he could not support Trump as a member of the Democratic Party. The announcement came as a surprise to his own staff. This also made Justice the first Republican governor of West Virginia since Cecil Underwood in 2001.

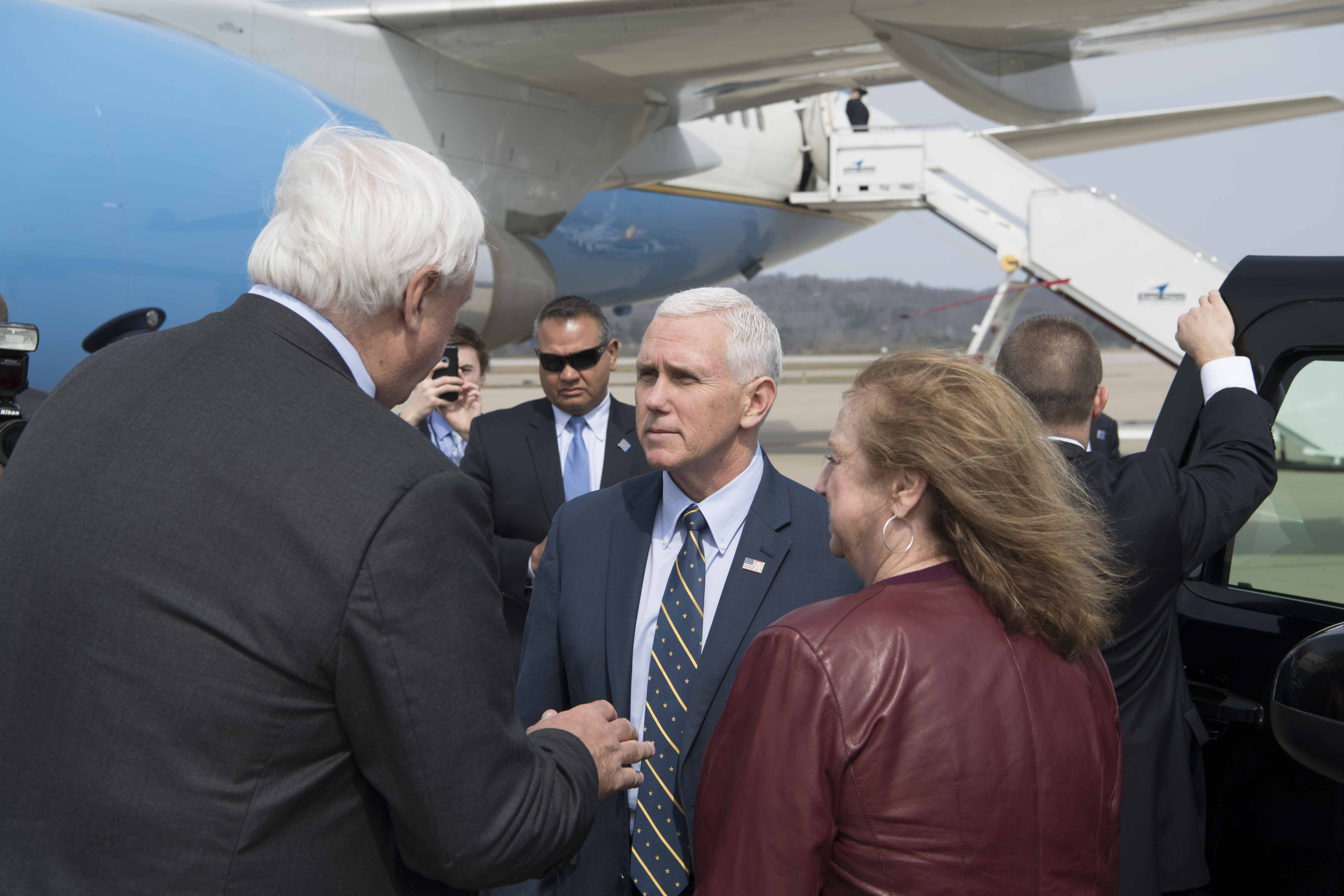
Jim and Cathy Justice with Vice President Mike Pence in March 2017

Even after switching to the Republican Party, Justice initially supported incumbent Democrat Joe Manchin for reelection in the 2018 Senate election in West Virginia. Later in the general election, Justice endorsed Republican Senate candidate Patrick Morrisey. In February 2021, when asked by The New York Times whether he planned to run against Manchin, Justice said, "No, I'm really not . . . [i]f I can continue to do good stuff for West Virginia, I'm going to do it, and then probably fade off into the sunset."

In 2020, Justice signed into law the Critical Infrastructure Protection Act, which created felony penalties for protests targeting oil and gas facilities. The law, which was passed with the support of Dominion Energy, the West Virginia Oil and Natural Gas Association, and the American Fuel and Petrochemical Manufacturers trade association, was described by its sponsor John Kelly as having been "requested by the natural gas industry".

In 2021, Justice appointed Bray Cary to the West Virginia University board of directors. He later received loans from Cary, which he described as a "business relationship" in a press conference.

== U.S. Senate ==
=== Elections ===
==== 2024 ====
In April 2023, Justice announced his candidacy for the 2024 United States Senate election in West Virginia. Justice defeated U.S. Representative Alex Mooney for the Republican nomination with 61 percent of the vote. The Democratic incumbent, Joe Manchin, did not run for reelection. Justice defeated Glenn Elliott, the former Democratic mayor of Wheeling, West Virginia, in the November 5 general election.

=== Tenure ===
On December 26, 2024, Justice announced that he would complete his gubernatorial term, which ended on January 13, 2025, before joining the Senate, reducing his Senate term by 10 days. He was sworn in on January 14 by Senate President pro tempore Chuck Grassley.

Justice missed the first roll-call vote of his Senate tenure, on an amendment to the Laken Riley Act. When President Donald Trump announced across-the-board tariffs on Canada, Mexico, and China in January 2025, Justice applauded the move, saying, "Everybody runs through the streets saying, 'The sky is falling! The sky is falling!', but it doesn't fall."

On the 15th day of the 2025 U.S. government shutdown, Justice hosted a birthday party for his bulldog Babydog at the Capitol.

=== Committee assignments ===
For the 119th Congress:

- Committee on Agriculture, Nutrition, and Forestry
  - Subcommittee on Conservation, Climate, Forestry, and Natural Resources
  - Subcommittee on Food and Nutrition, Specialty Crops, Organics, and Research
  - Subcommittee on Livestock, Dairy, Poultry, Local Food Systems, and Food Safety and Security
- Committee on Energy and Natural Resources
  - Subcommittee on Energy
  - Subcommittee on Public Lands, Forests, and Mining
  - Subcommittee on Water and Power
- Committee on Small Business and Entrepreneurship
- Special Committee on Aging

== Political positions ==
Justice began his gubernatorial campaign and political career as a conservative Democrat. Time identified him as a moderate Democrat. He switched to the Republican Party a few months after taking office and declared his support for President Donald Trump, to whose reelection campaign he contributed $200,000. Since his switch, Justice has been described as a moderate or liberal Republican by his 2024 primary opponent Alex Mooney and by Sam Brodey, writing for The Daily Beast.

=== Economic policy ===
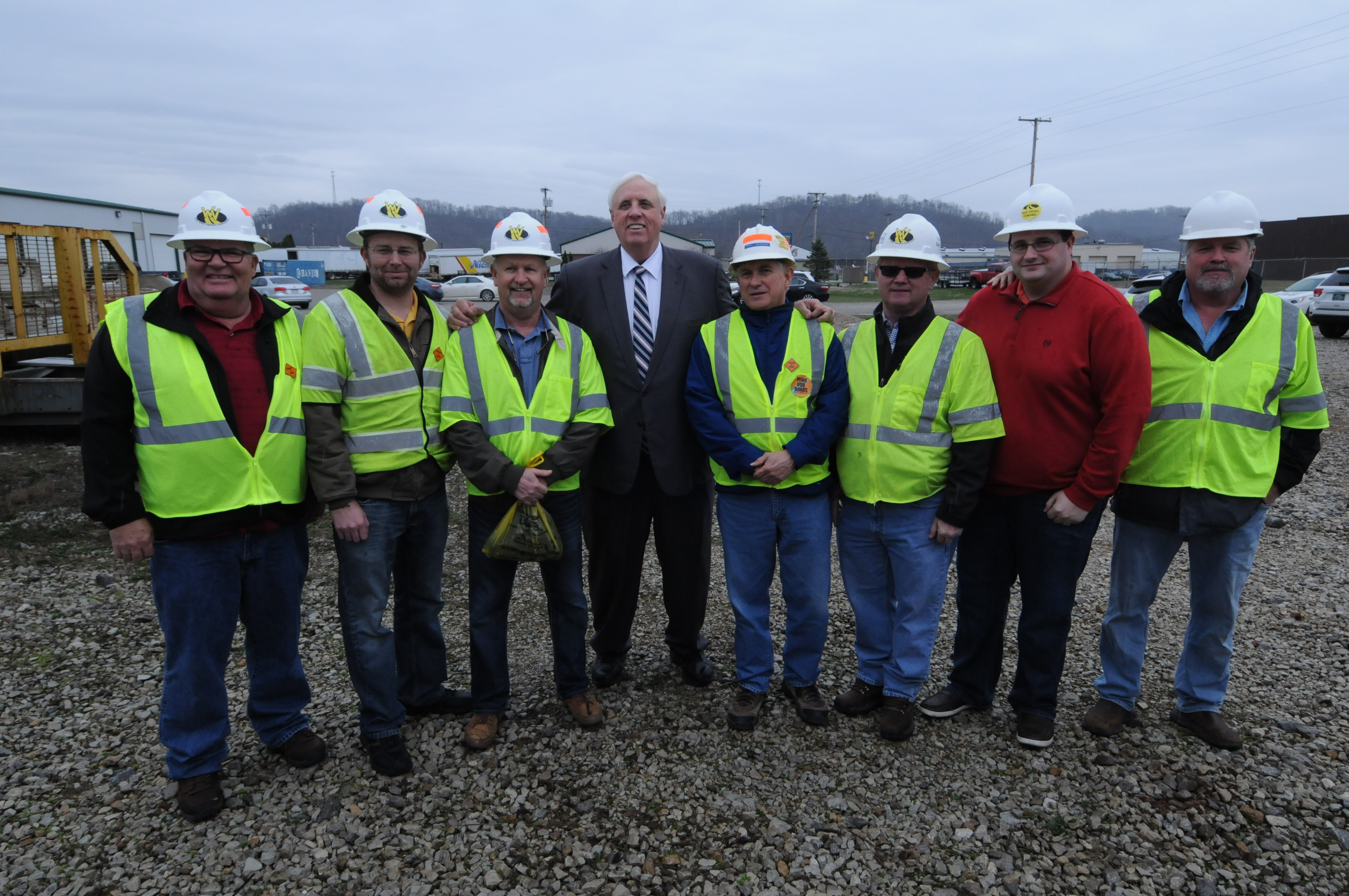
Justice posing for a photo with road workers in March 2017.

Justice campaigned and has governed with support for the coal industry. He opposes raising taxes but has supported increasing teachers' salaries, arguing that increased state revenue will pay for the increased budget spending. In 2017, Justice said that he opposed budget cuts and supported raising sales taxes. The libertarian Cato Institute gave Justice an "F" grade based on their positions, but Justice voiced his disagreement with the grade. Before Justice switched from a Democrat to a Republican, Senate president Mitch Carmichael called him "more Republican in his philosophies", saying, "where he has gotten away from that a little bit is his tax-and-spend policies".

In February 2021, Justice urged Senator Joe Manchin to vote for the $1.9 trillion stimulus package proposed by President Joe Biden, warning against being "fiscally responsible" and adding, "I don't really know exactly what the thinking could possibly be there. I mean, we got people that are really hurting."

Of proposals to raise the federal minimum wage to $15 an hour, Justice said, "it's really, really hard to say one size fits all" nationwide. He added, "to be able to make it on 7 or 8 dollars an hour, that's really, really tough", while also expressing concern that too high a minimum wage could lead to unemployment.

=== Abortion ===
Justice had said that he opposes abortion, but that the Supreme Court had decided the issue. Later, he attended a rally supporting Amendment 1, a state constitutional amendment banning abortion once Roe v. Wade was overturned. In September 2022, after Roe v. Wade was overturned, Justice signed into law a bill banning abortion at any stage of pregnancy, with exceptions for medical emergencies and victims of rape or incest. He has said that he stood "rock solid for life" as governor.

=== Gun rights ===
Justice supports gun ownership and limited gun laws. In 2018, while Governor of West Virginia, he signed into a law a bill allowing gun owners to keep their guns locked in vehicles on their employers' property, a bill the National Rifle Association (NRA) supported. He also signed a bill legalizing hunting on Sundays on private land. On April 27, 2021, Justice signed HB 2694, the Second Amendment Preservation and Anti-Federal Commandeering Act. The legislation prevents local law enforcement for being used to enforce federal gun control and prevents preemptive gun seizures from law-abiding persons. On March 1, 2023, Justice signed into law a bill legalizing campus carry for those with concealed carry permits.

=== Healthcare ===
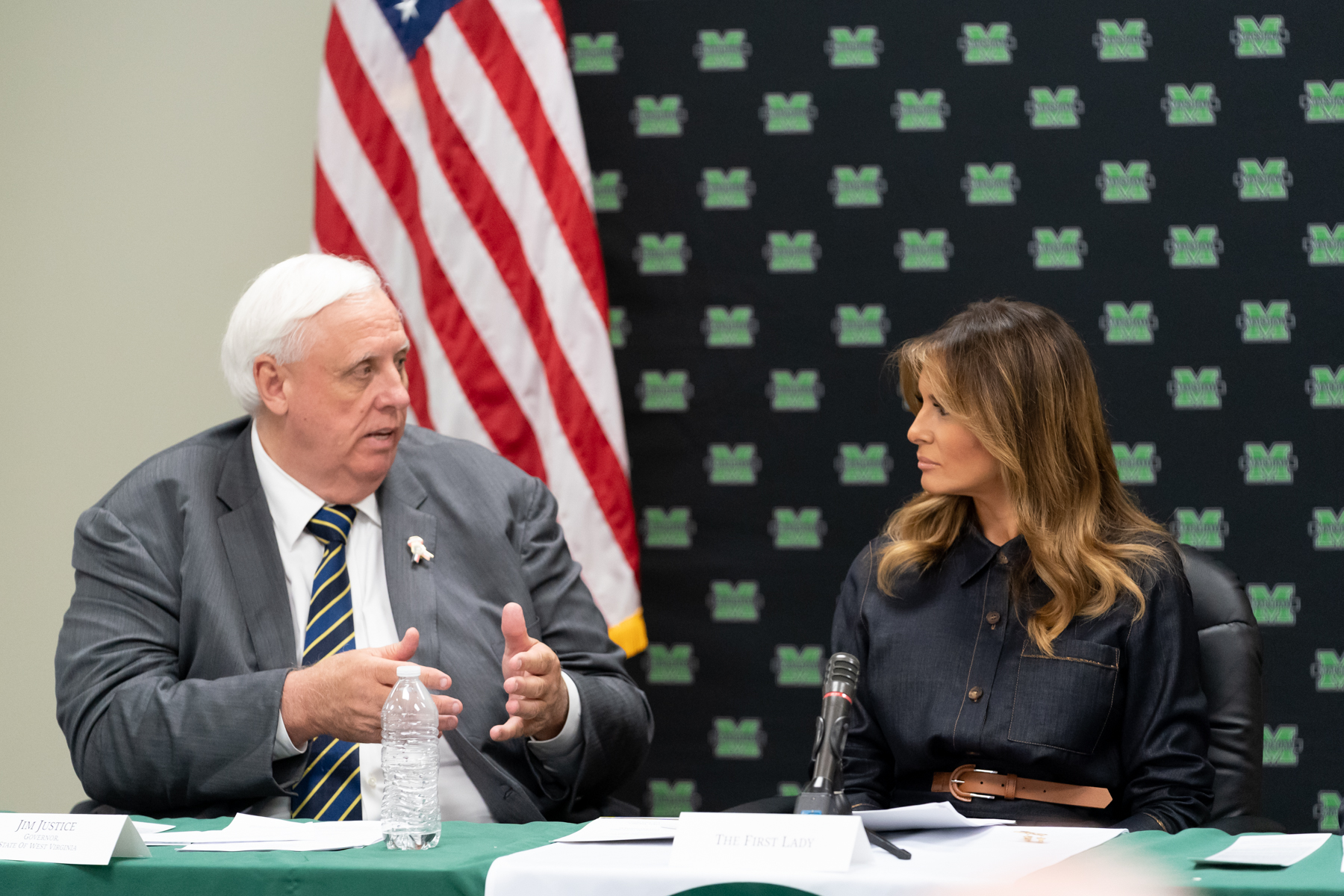
Justice speaks with First Lady Melania Trump at an opioids roundtable in Huntington in July 2019.

Justice supports West Virginia's Medicaid expansion, which was implemented by the previous governor under the Affordable Care Act (Obamacare). Justice opposed the American Health Care Act, a GOP House bill to repeal the Affordable Care Act, saying that the bill "would cripple [West Virginia] beyond belief."

=== LGBTQ rights ===
Justice has said that he respects the Supreme Court's decision in Obergefell v. Hodges, which legalized same-sex marriage nationwide, and that it is settled law. In 2017, he opposed a bill that would have allowed businesses to refuse service to LGBTQ customers. In 2023, Justice signed legislation prohibiting gender transition for minors. In 2024, Justice said he would need to review and "see the bill" before committing to sign the Fairness Act, legislation that would prohibit discrimination based on sexual orientation and gender identity in employment and customer service industries, but added, "if you're lesbian, gay, bisexual, transgender, you're welcome to come to West Virginia" and participate in the state's economy. Justice had said he would support similar legislation, also called the Fairness Act, in 2020. He has said that he "proudly" signed the 2021 law prohibiting transgender athletes from competing in West Virginia.

=== Environmental policy ===
According to the Charleston Gazette–Mail, Justice has equivocated on the scientific consensus on global warming. In a 2016 interview with the paper, he said: "There's documentation that would give one concern, and I don't think you should ignore that. At the same time, I think there's an awful lot of research that still should be done . . . I surely wouldn't sit here and say I am a believer in global warming, but I wouldn't sit here and say that I am not concerned."

At the beginning of his second term as governor, Justice said he was a believer in alternative energy, pointing to his welcoming of Clearway Energy Group to begin construction of a wind farm, which will increase state wind power by 15%. But he added, "it is frivolous for us to think that today our nation can go forward without coal or without gas. There will be a day we transition away from fossil fuels. But I frankly don't believe that it is now."

=== COVID-19 vaccines ===
Despite being one of the poorest states in the nation, West Virginia was, early on, second only to Alaska in vaccine distribution for COVID-19. Since then, it has lagged behind much of the nation. Justice encouraged West Virginians to get vaccinated with the slogan "Do It for Babydog", referring to his dog.

Justice sometimes expressed frustration with his state's Republican-majority legislature for being too extreme, and in 2024 he vetoed a bill to curb Vaccination requirements for nontraditional public school students. He acquired nationwide fame during the COVID-19 pandemic for promoting vaccination against the disease in accordance with the advice of medical experts.

== Personal life ==
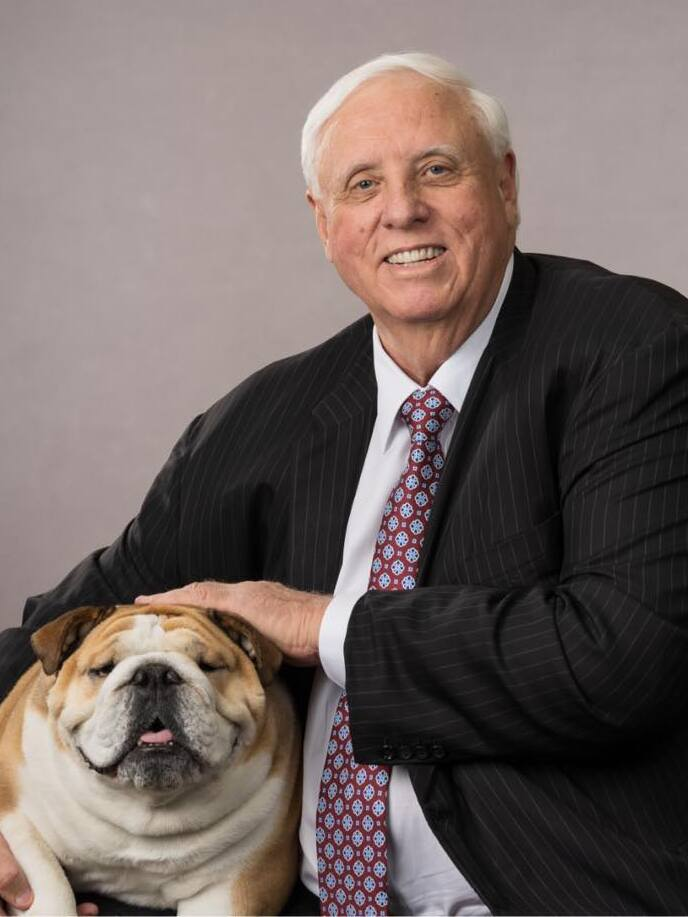
Justice with Babydog, his pet bulldog that often accompanies him

Justice met his wife, Cathy Justice (née Comer) in high school. They have two children. Justice and his wife are members of First Baptist Church in Beckley, a congregation of the American Baptist Churches USA. He is 6 feet 7 inches (2.01 m) tall and 368 pounds (167 kg). Justice is a lifelong fan of the New Orleans Saints of the National Football League, and spent $30 million to develop a training camp for the team to use in 2014 at the Greenbrier. Until 2019, he hosted the Greenbrier Classic, a PGA Tour event, at the Greenbrier annually.

Justice lives in Lewisburg, West Virginia. He was sued about his residency by former state house assistant minority whip Isaac Sponaugle on the basis that Justice did not live in the West Virginia Governor's Mansion in Charleston. The state constitution requires the governor to "reside at the seat of government", Charleston. The lawsuit was eventually put before the West Virginia State Supreme Court, which denied a motion for a writ of prohibition. Chief Justice Evan Jenkins defined "reside" in terms of statewide officeholders. On March 2, Justice resolved the lawsuit, agreeing to reside in Charleston and paying Sponaugle's legal fees.

Justice owns a female English bulldog named Babydog who has often appeared alongside him at public engagements, including at the 2024 Republican National Convention.

=== Youth sports ===
Since 1992, Justice has been president of Beckley Little League.

Justice has been the girls' basketball coach at Greenbrier East High School in Fairlea, West Virginia, since 2003, winning the state championship in 2012. In 2011, he also became the head coach of the boys' basketball teams, a position from which he stepped down in 2017. He was the only coach at the AAA level (the state's largest classification) to coach both the girls' and boys' basketball teams. Justice said that though he would put his business interests in a blind trust upon becoming governor, he would still coach basketball. He coached the girls' team through his two terms as governor and has remained the coach since being elected to the U.S. Senate.

== Electoral history ==
2016 West Virginia Democratic gubernatorial primary
Party	Candidate	Votes	%
Democratic	Jim Justice	132,704	51.37%
Democratic	Booth Goodwin	65,416	25.32%
Democratic	Jeff Kessler	60,230	23.31%
Total votes		258,350	100.00%

2016 West Virginia gubernatorial election
Party	Candidate	Votes	%
Democratic	Jim Justice	350,408	49.09%
Republican	Bill Cole	301,987	42.30%
Mountain	Charlotte Pritt	42,068	5.89%
Libertarian	David Moran	15,354	2.15%
Constitution	Phil Hudok	4,041	0.57%
Total votes		713,858	100.00%
Democratic hold			

2020 West Virginia Republican gubernatorial primary
Party	Candidate	Votes	%
Republican	Jim Justice (incumbent)	127,445	63.0%
Republican	Woody Thrasher	37,019	18.3%
Republican	Michael Folk	24,896	12.3%
Republican	Doug Six	4,231	2.1%
Republican	Brooke Lunsford	3,675	1.8%
Republican	Shelly Jean Fitzhugh	2,560	1.3%
Republican	Chuck Sheedy	2,415	1.2%
Total votes		202,241	100.0%

2020 West Virginia gubernatorial election
Party	Candidate	Votes	%
Republican	Jim Justice (incumbent)	497,944	63.49%
Democratic	Ben Salango	237,024	30.22%
Libertarian	Erika Kolenich	22,527	2.87%
Independent	S. Marshall Wilson (write-in)	15,120	1.93%
Mountain	Daniel Lutz	11,309	1.44%
Write-in		363	0.05%
Total votes		784,287	100.00%
Republican hold			

2024 US Senate Election in West Virginian Republican Primary
Party	Candidate	Votes	%
Republican	Jim Justice	138,307	61.84%
Republican	Alex Mooney	59,348	26.54%
Republican	Bryan Bird	7,001	3.13%
Republican	Bryan McKinney	6,573	2.94%
Republican	Zane Lawhorn	4,517	2.02%
Republican	Janet McNulty	4,404	1.97%
Republican	Don Lindsay	3,503	1.57%
Total votes		223,653	100.00%

2024 United States Senate election in West Virginia
Party	Candidate	Votes	%	±%
Republican	Jim Justice	514,079	68.75%	+22.49%
Democratic	Glenn Elliott	207,548	27.76%	−21.81%
Libertarian	David Moran	26,075	3.49%	−0.68%
Write-in		15	0.00%	N/A
Total votes		747,717	100.00%	N/A
Republican gain from Independent				

== See also ==
- List of American politicians who switched parties in office
- List of richest American politicians
- Party switching in the United States

== Notes ==
Party political offices
Preceded by Earl Ray Tomblin	Democratic nominee for Governor of West Virginia; 2016	Succeeded by Ben Salango
Preceded by Bill Cole	Republican nominee for Governor of West Virginia; 2020	Succeeded by Patrick Morrisey
Preceded by Patrick Morrisey	Republican nominee for U.S. Senator from West Virginia (Class 1); 2024	Most recent
Political offices
Preceded by Earl Ray Tomblin	Governor of West Virginia; 2017–2025	Succeeded by Patrick Morrisey
U.S. Senate
Preceded by Joe Manchin	United States Senator (Class 1) from West Virginia; 2025–present Served alongside: Shelley Moore Capito	Incumbent
U.S. order of precedence (ceremonial)
Preceded by Ruben Gallego	Order of precedence of the United States as United States Senator	Succeeded by Jon Husted
Preceded by Tim Sheehy	United States senators by seniority 96th	Succeeded by Jon Husted
