= List of members of the 86th West Virginia Legislature =

The 86th West Virginia Legislatures consisted of the West Virginia Senate and the House of Delegates. The first session began on January 11, 2023 and the second session began January 10, 2024.

== House of Delegates ==
=== 86th Legislature party leadership ===
| Position | Name | Party | District | County |
|---|---|---|---|---|
| Speaker of the House | Roger Hanshaw | Republican | 62nd | Clay |
| Speaker pro tempore | Matthew Rohrbach | Republican | 98th | Cabell |
| Majority Leader | Pat McGeehan | Republican | 1st | Brooke, Hancock |
| Minority Leader | Sean Hornbuckle | Democratic | 25th | Cabell |
| Majority Whip | Marty Gearheart | Republican | 37th | Mercer |
| Minority Whip | Shawn Fluharty | Democratic | 5th | Ohio |

=== Committee chairs and ranking members ===
| Committee | | Chair | Minority Chair |
|---|---|---|---|
| Agriculture and Natural Resources | Agriculture | Ty Nestor | Ric Griffith |
| Agriculture and Natural Resources | Natural Resources | Chuck Horst | Evan Hansen |
| Banking and Insurance | Banking | Trenton Barnhart | Larry Rowe |
| Banking and Insurance | Insurance | Steve Westfall | Larry Rowe |
| Economic Development and Tourism | | Gary Howell | Vacant |
| Education | | Joe Ellington | Vacant |
| Energy and Manufacturing | | Bill Anderson | Evan Hansen |
| Finance | | Vernon Criss | Larry Rowe |
| Fire Departments and EMS | | Phil Mallow | Vacant |
| Government Organization | | Chris Phillips | Kayla Young |
| Health and Human Services | | Amy Summers | Mike Pushkin |
| Jails and Prisons | | David Kelly | Joey Garcia |
| Judiciary | | Tom Fast | Joey Garcia |
| Pensions and Retirement | | Marty Gearheart | Vacant |
| Political Subdivisions | | Carl Martin | John Williams |
| Prevention & Treatment of Substance Abuse | | Matthew Rohrbach | Vacant |
| Rules | | Roger Hanshaw | Sean Hornbuckle |
| Senior, Children, and Family Issues | | Margitta Mazzocchi | Vacant |
| Technology and Infrastructure | | Daniel Linville | John Williams |
| Veteran Affairs and Homeland Security | Veteran Affairs | Roy Cooper | Ric Griffith |
| Veteran Affairs and Homeland Security | Homeland Security | D. Rolland Jennings | Mike Pushkin |
| Workforce Development | | Evan Worrell | Kayla Young |

=== Members ===
Current House composition by district: Held by Democrats Held by Republicans

| District | Delegate | Party | Since | Residence | Counties represented |
|---|---|---|---|---|---|
| 1 | Pat McGeehan | Republican | 2014 | Chester | Brooke, Hancock |
| 2 | Mark Zatezalo | Republican | 2020 | Weirton | Brooke, Hancock |
| 3 | Jimmy Willis | Republican | 2022 | Wellsburg | Brooke, Ohio |
| 4 | Diana Winzenreid | Republican | 2023 | Wheeling | Ohio |
| 5 | Shawn Fluharty | Democratic | 2014 | Wheeling | Ohio |
| 6 | Jeffrey Stephens | Republican | 2023 | Wheeling | Marshall |
| 7 | Charles Sheedy | Republican | 2022 | Cameron | Marshall, Wetzel |
| 8 | David Kelly | Republican | 2018 | Sistersville | Doddridge, Tyler, Wetzel |
| 9 | Trenton Barnhart | Republican | 2019 | St. Marys | Pleasants, Ritchie, Tyler |
| 10 | Bill Anderson | Republican | 1992 | Williamstown | Wood |
| 11 | Bob Fehrenbacher | Republican | 2022 | Vienna | Wood |
| 12 | Vernon Criss | Republican | 2016 | Parkersburg | Wood |
| 13 | Scot Heckert | Republican | 2022 | Parkersburg | Wood |
| 14 | Dave Foggin | Republican | 2022 | Belleville | Wirt, Wood |
| 15 | Erica Moore | Republican | 2023 | Spencer | Roane, Wirt |
| 16 | Steve Westfall | Republican | 2012 | Ripley | Jackson |
| 17 | Jonathan Pinson | Republican | 2020 | Point Pleasant | Jackson, Mason |
| 18 | Jim Butler | Republican | 2022 | Gallipolis Ferry | Mason, Putnam |
| 19 | Kathie Hess Crouse | Republican | 2021 | Buffalo | Putnam |
| 20 | Geoff Foster | Republican | 2014 | Winfield | Putnam |
| 21 | Jarred Cannon | Republican | 2022 | Hurricane | Putnam |
| 22 | Daniel Linville | Republican | 2018 | Milton | Cabell |
| 23 | Evan Worrell | Republican | 2018 | Barboursville | Cabell |
| 24 | Patrick Lucas | Republican | 2022 | Barboursville | Cabell |
| 25 | Sean Hornbuckle | Democratic | 2014 | Huntington | Cabell |
| 26 | Matthew Rohrbach | Republican | 2014 | Huntington | Cabell |
| 27 | Ric Griffith | Democratic | 2020 | Kenova | Cabell, Wayne |
| 28 | Ryan Browning | Republican | 2024 | Kenova | Wayne |
| 29 | Henry Dillon | Republican | 2022 | Fort Gay | Mingo, Wayne |
| 30 | David Adkins | Republican | 2022 | Hamlin | Lincoln |
| 31 | Margitta Mazzocchi | Republican | 2020 | Chapmanville | Boone, Lincoln, Logan |
| 32 | Josh Holstein | Republican | 2020 | Ashford | Boone |
| 33 | Jordan Bridges | Republican | 2020 | Logan | Logan |
| 34 | Mark Dean | Republican | 2016 | Gilbert | McDowell, Mingo |
| 35 | Adam Vance | Republican | 2022 | Brenton | Wyoming |
| 36 | David Green | Republican | 2024 | McDowell | McDowell |
| 37 | Marty Gearheart | Republican | 2020 | Bluefield | Mercer |
| 38 | Joe Ellington | Republican | 2010 | Princeton | Mercer |
| 39 | Doug Smith | Republican | 2020 | Princeton | Mercer |
| 40 | Roy Cooper | Republican | 2012 | Wayside | Monroe, Summers |
| 41 | Jordan Maynor | Republican | 2021 | Beaver | Mercer, Raleigh, Summers |
| 42 | Brandon Steele | Republican | 2018 | Beckley | Raleigh |
| 43 | Chris Toney | Republican | 2018 | Beckley | Raleigh, Wyoming |
| 44 | Bill Roop | Republican | 2024 | Beckley | Raleigh |
| 45 | Eric Brooks | Republican | 2022 | Mount Hope | Fayette, Raleigh |
| 46 | Jeff Campbell | Republican | 2023 | Lewisburg | Pocahontas, Greenbrier |
| 47 | Todd Longanacre | Republican | 2020 | Caldwell | Greenbrier, Monroe |
| 48 | Tom Clark | Republican | 2024 | Webster Springs | Greenbrier, Nicholas, Webster |
| 49 | Heather Tully | Republican | 2020 | Summersville | Nicholas |
| 50 | Elliott Pritt | Republican | 2022 | Oak Hill | Fayette |
| 51 | Tom Fast | Republican | 2014 | Fayetteville | Fayette |
| 52 | Larry Rowe | Democratic | 2014 | Malden | Kanawha |
| 53 | Chris Pritt | Republican | 2020 | Charleston | Kanawha |
| 54 | Mike Pushkin | Democratic | 2014 | Charleston | Kanawha |
| 55 | JB Akers | Republican | 2024 | Charleston | Kanawha |
| 56 | Kayla Young | Democratic | 2020 | South Charleston | Kanawha |
| 57 | Hollis Lewis | Democratic | 2023 | Charleston | Kanawha |
| 58 | Walter Hall | Republican | 2022 | St. Albans | Kanawha |
| 59 | Andy Shamblin | Republican | 2022 | Nitro | Kanawha |
| 60 | Dana Ferrell | Republican | 2020 | Sissonville | Kanawha |
| 61 | Dean Jeffries | Republican | 2018 | Elkview | Kanawha |
| 62 | Roger Hanshaw | Republican | 2014 | Wallback | Calhoun, Clay, Gilmer |
| 63 | Lori Dittman | Republican | 2022 | Gassaway | Braxton, Gilmer |
| 64 | Adam Burkhammer | Republican | 2020 | Horner | Lewis, Upshur |
| 65 | Carl Martin | Republican | 2018 | Buckhannon | Upshur |
| 66 | Ty Nestor | Republican | 2020 | Elkins | Pocahontas, Randolph |
| 67 | Elias Coop-Gonzalez | Republican | 2022 | Elkins | Pendleton, Randolph |
| 68 | Chris Phillips | Republican | 2018 | Buckhannon | Barbour, Upshur |
| 69 | Keith Marple | Republican | 2022 | Lost Creek | Harrison, Lewis |
| 70 | Mickey Petitto | Republican | 2022 | Clarksburg | Harrison |
| 71 | Laura Kimble | Republican | 2020 | Bridgeport | Harrison |
| 72 | Clay Riley | Republican | 2020 | Shinnston | Harrison, Wetzel |
| 73 | Amy Summers | Republican | 2014 | Flemington | Marion, Taylor |
| 74 | Mike DeVault | Republican | 2022 | Fairmont | Marion |
| 75 | Phil Mallow | Republican | 2020 | Fairmont | Marion |
| 76 | Joey Garcia | Democratic | 2020 | Fairmont | Marion |
| 77 | Joe Statler | Republican | 2020 | Core | Monongalia, Wetzel |
| 78 | Geno Chiarelli | Republican | 2022 | Morgantown | Monongalia |
| 79 | Evan Hansen | Democratic | 2018 | Morgantown | Monongalia |
| 80 | John Williams | Democratic | 2016 | Morgantown | Monongalia |
| 81 | Anitra Hamilton | Democratic | 2023 | Morgantown | Monongalia |
| 82 | Debbie Warner | Republican | 2022 | Morgantown | Monongalia |
| 83 | George Street | Republican | 2022 | Masontown | Preston |
| 84 | D. Rolland Jennings | Republican | 2017 | Thornton | Preston |
| 85 | John Paul Hott | Republican | 2018 | Petersburg | Grant, Tucker |
| 86 | Bryan Ward | Republican | 2020 | Fisher | Hardy, Pendleton |
| 87 | Gary Howell | Republican | 2010 | Keyser | Mineral |
| 88 | Rick Hillenbrand | Republican | 2022 | Romney | Hampshire, Mineral |
| 89 | Vacant | Republican | | | Hampshire, Morgan |
| 90 | George Miller | Republican | 2020 | Berkeley Springs | Berkeley, Morgan |
| 91 | Vacant | Democratic | | | Berkeley |
| 92 | Michael Hite | Republican | 2022 | Martinsburg | Berkeley |
| 93 | Michael Hornby | Republican | 2022 | Martinsburg | Berkeley |
| 94 | Larry Kump | Republican | 2022 | Falling Waters | Berkeley |
| 95 | Chuck Horst | Republican | 2020 | Falling Waters | Berkeley |
| 96 | Eric Householder | Republican | 2010 | Martinsburg | Berkeley |
| 97 | John Hardy | Republican | 2018 | Shepherdstown | Berkeley, Jefferson |
| 98 | Joe Funkhouser | Republican | 2024 | Charles Town | Jefferson |
| 99 | Wayne Clark | Republican | 2020 | Charles Town | Jefferson |
| 100 | William Ridenour | Republican | 2022 | Harpers Ferry | Jefferson |

== Senate ==
=== Leadership of the 86th West Virginia Senate ===
| Position | Name | Party | District | County |
|---|---|---|---|---|
| Senate President/Lieutenant Governor | Randy Smith | Republican | 14th | Tucker |
| President pro tempore | Donna Boley | Republican | 3rd | Pleasants |
| Majority Leader | Patrick Martin | Republican | 12th | Lewis |
| Minority Leader | Mike Woelfel | Democratic | 5th | Cabell |
| Majority Whip | Jay Taylor | Republican | 14th | Taylor |
| Minority Whip | Robert Plymale | Democratic | 5th | Wayne |

=== Committee chairs and vice chairs ===
| Committee | Chair | Vice Chair |
|---|---|---|
| Agriculture & Natural Resources | Bill Hamilton | Vince Deeds |
| Banking and Insurance | Mike Azinger | Mike Oliverio |
| Confirmations | Donna Boley | Laura Chapman |
| Economic Development | Glenn Jeffries | Patrick Martin |
| Education | Amy Grady | Charles Clements |
| Energy, Industry, & Mining | Randy Smith | Ben Queen |
| Enrolled Bills | Jack Woodrum | Rollan Roberts |
| Finance | Eric Tarr | Rupie Phillips |
| Government Organization | Patricia Rucker | Jack Woodrum |
| Health & Human Resources | Laura Chapman | Vince Deeds |
| Judiciary | Mike Stuart | Tom Willis |
| Military | Ryan Weld | Vince Deeds |
| Outdoor Recreation | Mark Maynard | Jay Taylor |
| Pensions | Eric Nelson | Mark Hunt |
| Rules | Craig Blair | Tom Takubo |
| School Choice | Patricia Rucker | Mark Maynard |
| Transportation & Infrastructure | Charles Clements | Mike Stuart |
| Workforce | Rollan Roberts | Glenn Jeffries |

=== Members of the 86th West Virginia Senate ===
| District | Up | Senator | Party | Since | Residence | Home Cty. (Note: Multi-county districts (all but District 17) must elect Senators from different counties) | Counties represented |
|---|---|---|---|---|---|---|---|
| 1 | 2026 | Laura Chapman | Republican | 2022 | Wheeling | Ohio | Brooke, Hancock, Marshall, Ohio |
| 1 | 2024 | Ryan Weld | Republican | 2016 | Wellsburg | Brooke | Brooke, Hancock, Marshall, Ohio |
| 2 | 2026 | Charles H. Clements | Republican | 2016 | New Martinsville | Wetzel | Doddridge, Marion, Marshall, Monongalia, Wetzel, Tyler |
| 2 | 2024 | Chris Rose | Republican | 2024 | Maidsville | Monongalia | Doddridge, Marion, Marshall, Monongalia, Wetzel, Tyler |
| 3 | 2026 | Mike Azinger | Republican | 2016 | Vienna | Wood | Pleasants, Ritchie, Wirt, Wood |
| 3 | 2024 | Donna Boley | Republican | 1985 | St. Marys | Pleasants | Pleasants, Ritchie, Wirt, Wood |
| 4 | 2026 | Eric Tarr | Republican | 2018 | Scott Depot | Putnam | Cabell, Jackson, Mason, Putnam |
| 4 | 2024 | Amy Grady | Republican | 2020 | Leon | Mason | Cabell, Jackson, Mason, Putnam |
| 5 | 2026 | Mike Woelfel | Democratic | 2014 | Huntington | Cabell | Cabell, Wayne |
| 5 | 2024 | Robert H. Plymale | Democratic | 1992 | Ceredo | Wayne | Cabell, Wayne |
| 6 | 2026 | Mark R. Maynard | Republican | 2014 | Genoa | Wayne | McDowell, Mercer, Mingo, Wayne |
| 6 | 2024 | Chandler Swope | Republican | 2016 | Bluefield | Mercer | McDowell, Mercer, Mingo, Wayne |
| 7 | 2026 | Mike Stuart | Republican | 2022 | South Charleston | Kanawha | Boone, Kanawha, Lincoln, Logan |
| 7 | 2024 | Rupie Phillips | Republican | 2020 | Lorado | Logan | Boone, Kanawha, Lincoln, Logan |
| 8 | 2026 | Vacant (Note: Mark Hunt resigned after being elected Auditor of West Virginia) | Republican | | | | Clay, Jackson, Kanawha, Putnam, Roane |
| 8 | 2024 | Glenn Jeffries | Republican | 2016 | Red House | Putnam | Clay, Jackson, Kanawha, Putnam, Roane |
| 9 | 2026 | Rollan Roberts | Republican | 2018 | Beaver | Raleigh | Fayette, Raleigh, Wyoming |
| 9 | 2024 | David Stover | Republican | 2020 | Maben | Wyoming | Fayette, Raleigh, Wyoming |
| 10 | 2026 | Vince Deeds | Republican | 2022 | Renick | Greenbrier | Fayette, Greenbrier, Monroe, Nicholas, Summers |
| 10 | 2024 | Jack Woodrum | Republican | 2020 | Hinton | Summers | Fayette, Greenbrier, Monroe, Nicholas, Summers |
| 11 | 2026 | Bill Hamilton | Republican | 2018 | Buckhannon | Upshur | Barbour, Braxton, Pendleton, Pocahontas, Randolph, Upshur, Webster |
| 11 | 2024 | Robbie Morris | Republican | 2020 | Elkins | Randolph | Barbour, Braxton, Pendleton, Pocahontas, Randolph, Upshur, Webster |
| 12 | 2026 | Ben Queen | Republican | 2022 | Bridgeport | Harrison | Calhoun, Gilmer, Harrison, Lewis, Taylor |
| 12 | 2024 | Patrick S. Martin | Republican | 2020 | Weston | Lewis | Calhoun, Gilmer, Harrison, Lewis, Taylor |
| 13 | 2026 | Mike Oliverio | Republican | 2022 (Note: Oliverio previously served in the Senate from 1994 to 2010.) | Morgantown | Monongalia | Marion, Monongalia |
| 13 | 2024 | Joey Garcia | Democratic | 2020 | Fairmont | Marion | Marion, Monongalia |
| 14 | 2026 | Jay Taylor | Republican | 2022 | Grafton | Taylor | Grant, Hardy, Mineral, Preston, Taylor, Tucker |
| 14 | 2024 | Randy Smith | Republican | 2016 | Thomas | Tucker | Grant, Hardy, Mineral, Preston, Taylor, Tucker |
| 15 | 2026 | Darren Thorne | Republican | 2024 | Romney | Hampshire | Berkeley, Hampshire, Morgan |
| 15 | 2024 | Craig Blair | Republican | 2012 | Martinsburg | Berkeley | Berkeley, Hampshire, Morgan |
| 16 | 2026 | Jason Barrett | Republican | 2022 | Martinsburg | Berkeley | Berkeley, Jefferson |
| 16 | 2024 | Patricia Rucker | Republican | 2016 | Harpers Ferry | Jefferson | Berkeley, Jefferson |
| 17 | 2026 | Tom Takubo | Republican | 2014 | Charleston | Kanawha | Kanawha |
| 17 | 2024 | Vacant (Note: Eric Nelson resigned after being appointed as revenue secretary in the administration of Governor Patrick Morrisey) | Republican | | | Kanawha | Kanawha |
