= Barbara Fleischauer =

American politician

Member of the West Virginia House of Delegates
- In office December 1, 2006 – December 1, 2022
- Preceded by: Cindy Frich; Nancy Houston
- Succeeded by: New boundaries
- Constituency: 51st district (2012–2022); 44th district (2006–2012)
- In office December 1, 1994 – December 1, 2004
- Preceded by: Stephen Cook; Mike Oliverio
- Succeeded by: Charlene Marshall
- Constituency: 44th district

Personal details
- Born: September 1, 1953 (age 73) Homestead, Pennsylvania, U.S.
- Party: Democratic
- Education: Allegheny College; West Virginia University College of Law
- Profession: Attorney
- Website: friendsofbarbara.com

Barbara Evans Fleischauer (born September 1, 1953) is an American politician who was a Democratic member of the West Virginia House of Delegates. She began representing District 51 on January 12, 2013. Fleischauer served consecutively from January 2007 until January 2013 and non-consecutively from January 1995 until January 2005 in a District 44 seat.

In November 2021, Fleischauer announced she would not seek re-election to the House of Delegates and instead run for the 13th District in the 2022 elections for the West Virginia Senate.

== Politics ==
Until Republicans gained control of the House following the 2014 elections, Fleischauer chaired the Committee on Constitutional Revision during the 73rd, 74th, 75th, 76th, 78th, 79th, 80th and 81st Legislatures (1996–2004; 2006–2014); co-chaired the Equal Pay Commission during the 73rd, 74th and 75th Legislatures (1996–2002); and co-chaired the Juvenile Task Force during the 73rd, 74th and 75th Legislatures (1996–2002).

Since the 2014 elections, Fleischauer has served as Minority chair of the House Judiciary Committee during the 84th Legislature (2018–2020) and Minority chair of the Veterans Affairs Committee during the 85th Legislature (2020–2022).

In 2018, Democrats — including Fleischauer — swept all five seats in the 51st district, the largest multi-member district in the House. As a result, the Monongalia County delegates, all Democrats, called themselves “The Fab Five” and frequently voted and worked together on bills. This was especially notable given that Fleischauer was the only Democratic member of the delegation just four years earlier, after the 2014 elections. In 2020, Delegate Rodney Pyles was defeated for re-election by former Republican Delegate Joe Statler, breaking the all-Democratic delegation.

== Personal ==
Fleischauer earned her BA degree from Allegheny College and her JD from the West Virginia University College of Law. She is married to West Virginia University College of Law Professor Bob Bastress and has two children.

== Elections ==
=== 2010 election ===
==== Primary election ====
West Virginia House of Delegates, 2010 Monongalia County, 44th District (Vote for 4)
Party	Candidate	Votes	%
Democratic	Charlene Marshall (incumbent)	4,921	23.05%
Democratic	Barbara Evans Fleischauer (incumbent)	4,819	22.57%
Democratic	Stephen Lee Cook	3,514	16.46%
Democratic	Anthony Barill	3,280	15.36%
Democratic	Charles William Byrer	2,441	11.43%
Democratic	Shelby Jean Bosley	2,375	11.12%
Total votes		21,350	100.00%

==== General election ====
West Virginia House of Delegates, 2010 Monongalia County, 44th District (Vote for 4)
Party	Candidate	Votes	%
Democratic	Charlene Marshall (incumbent)	12,003	15.41%
Democratic	Barbara Evans Fleischauer (incumbent)	11,460	14.72%
Republican	Amanda Pasdon	9,736	12.50%
Democratic	Anthony Barill	9,494	12.19%
Republican	Chris Walters	8,806	11.31%
Democratic	Stephen Lee Cook	8,445	10.84%
Republican	Kevin Scott Poe	8,273	10.62%
Republican	Kevin Lee Patrick Jr.	6,356	8.16%
Independent	Paul Burton Brown	2,559	3.29%
Libertarian	Tad Britch	747	0.96%
Total votes		77,879	100.00%

=== 2012 election ===
==== Primary election ====
West Virginia House of Delegates, 2012 Monongalia County, 51st District (Vote for 5)
Party	Candidate	Votes	%
Democratic	Charlene Marshall (incumbent)	5,358	25.07%
Democratic	Barbara Evans Fleischauer (incumbent)	5,226	24.45%
Democratic	Anthony Barill (incumbent)	4,414	20.65%
Democratic	Billy Smerka Jr.	3,189	14.92%
Democratic	Nancy Jamison	3,188	14.91%
Total votes		21,375	100.00%

==== General election ====
West Virginia House of Delegates, 2012 Monongalia County, 51st District (Vote for 5)
Party	Candidate	Votes	%
Democratic	Charlene Marshall (incumbent)	15,078	11.97%
Republican	Cindy Frich	14,677	11.65%
Democratic	Barbara Evans Fleischauer (incumbent)	14,381	11.41%
Republican	Amanda Pasdon (incumbent)	13,542	10.75%
Democratic	Anthony Barill (incumbent)	13,188	10.47%
Republican	Kevin Scott Poe	11,535	9.16%
Democratic	Nancy Jamison	11,112	8.82%
Democratic	Billy Smerka Jr.	11,067	8.78%
Republican	John P. Woods	10,388	8.25%
Republican	Jay Redmond	9,907	7.86%
American Freedom	Harry V. Bertram	1,110	0.88%
Total votes		125,985	100.00%

=== 2014 election ===
==== Primary election ====
West Virginia House of Delegates, 2014 Monongalia County, 51st District (Vote for 5)
Party	Candidate	Votes	%
Democratic	Barbara Evans Fleischauer (incumbent)	3,346	19.56%
Democratic	Charlene Marshall (incumbent)	3,149	18.41%
Democratic	Anthony Barill (incumbent)	2,407	14.07%
Democratic	John Williams	2,223	12.99%
Democratic	Nancy Jamison	2,183	12.76%
Democratic	Marti Shamberger	1,955	11.43%
Democratic	Michael David Safcask	1,846	10.79%
Total votes		17,109	100.00%

==== General election ====
West Virginia House of Delegates, 2014 Monongalia County, 51st District (Vote for 5)
Party	Candidate	Votes	%
Republican	Brian Kurcaba	9,040	11.28%
Republican	Amanda Pasdon (incumbent)	9,006	11.24%
Republican	Cindy Frich (incumbent)	8,782	10.96%
Republican	Joe Statler	8,772	10.95%
Democratic	Barbara Evans Fleischauer (incumbent)	8,543	10.66%
Democratic	Charlene Marshall (incumbent)	8,133	10.15%
Democratic	John Williams	7,622	9.51%
Democratic	Anthony Barill (incumbent)	7,378	9.21%
Republican	Bill Flanigan	5,995	7.48%
Democratic	Nancy Jamison	5,769	7.20%
Libertarian	Ed Olesh	1,093	1.36%
Total votes		80,133	100.00%

=== 2016 election ===
==== Primary election ====
West Virginia House of Delegates, 2016 Monongalia County, 51st District (Vote for 5)
Party	Candidate	Votes	%
Democratic	Barbara Evans Fleischauer (incumbent)	9,702	20.12%
Democratic	John Williams	6,438	13.35%
Democratic	Evan Hansen	6,414	13.30%
Democratic	Nancy Jamison	6,136	12.73%
Democratic	Rodney Pyles	5,842	12.12%
Democratic	Billy Smerka Jr.	5,603	11.62%
Democratic	John G. Lucas	4,105	8.51%
Democratic	Barry Lee Wendell	3,971	8.24%
Total votes		48,211	100.00%

==== General election ====
West Virginia House of Delegates, 2016 Monongalia County, 51st District (Vote for 5)
Party	Candidate	Votes	%
Democratic	Barbara Evans Fleischauer (incumbent)	16,269	11.84%
Republican	Cindy Frich (incumbent)	16,182	11.78%
Republican	Joe Statler (incumbent)	15,318	11.15%
Democratic	John Williams	14,386	10.47%
Democratic	Rodney Pyles	13,025	9.48%
Democratic	Evan Hansen	12,988	9.45%
Democratic	Nancy Jamison	12,426	9.04%
Republican	Roger Shuttlesworth	12,407	9.03%
Republican	Eric Finch	9,832	7.16%
Republican	Michael Acevdeo	9,742	7.09%
Libertarian	Eddie Wagoner	4,824	3.51%
Total votes		137,399	100.00%

=== 2018 election ===
==== Primary election ====
West Virginia House of Delegates, 2018 Monongalia County, 51st District (Vote for 5)
Party	Candidate	Votes	%
Democratic	Barbara Evans Fleischauer (incumbent)	6,116	21.54%
Democratic	Evan Hansen	5,639	19.86%
Democratic	Danielle Walker	5,104	17.98%
Democratic	John Williams (incumbent)	4,994	17.59%
Democratic	Rodney Pyles (incumbent)	3,952	13.92%
Democratic	Cory Kennedy	2,585	9.11%
Total votes		28,390	100.00%

==== General election ====
West Virginia House of Delegates, 2018 Monongalia County, 51st District (Vote for 5)
Party	Candidate	Votes	%
Democratic	Barbara Evans Fleischauer (incumbent)	16,357	12.21%
Democratic	Evan Hansen	15,558	11.62%
Democratic	John Williams (incumbent)	15,045	11.23%
Democratic	Danielle Walker	14,725	10.99%
Democratic	Rodney Pyles (incumbent)	14,240	10.63%
Republican	Joe Statler (incumbent)	13,051	9.74%
Republican	Cindy Frich (incumbent)	12,601	9.41%
Republican	Debbie Warner	11,058	8.26%
Republican	Roger Shuttlesworth	8,885	6.63%
Republican	Aaron Metz	8,464	6.32%
Libertarian	Buddy Guthrie	3,011	2.25%
American Freedom	Harry Bertram	942	0.70%
Write-in		79	0.06%
Total votes		134,016	100.00%

=== 2020 election ===
==== Primary election ====
West Virginia House of Delegates, 2020 Monongalia County, 51st District (Vote for 5)
Party	Candidate	Votes	%
Democratic	Danielle Walker (incumbent)	9,685	20.65%
Democratic	Barbara Evans Fleischauer (incumbent)	9,626	20.52%
Democratic	Evan Hansen (incumbent)	9,300	19.83%
Democratic	John Williams (incumbent)	8,065	17.19%
Democratic	Rodney Pyles (incumbent)	6,889	14.69%
Democratic	Jeffrey Budkey	3,343	7.13%
Total votes		46,908	100.00%

==== General election ====
West Virginia House of Delegates, 2020 Monongalia County, 51st District (Vote for 5)
Party	Candidate	Votes	%
Democratic	Barbara Evans Fleischauer (incumbent)	19,718	11.84%
Democratic	Evan Hansen (incumbent)	18,800	11.29%
Republican	Joe Statler	18,304	10.99%
Democratic	Danielle Walker (incumbent)	17,931	10.77%
Democratic	John Williams (incumbent)	17,737	10.65%
Republican	Cindy Frich	17,704	10.63%
Democratic	Rodney Pyles (incumbent)	17,689	10.63%
Republican	Justin White	14,187	8.52%
Republican	Todd Stainbrook	12,204	7.33%
Republican	Zach Lemaire	12,134	7.29%
Write-in		71	0.04%
Total votes		166,479	100.00%

- 2012 Redistricted to District 51 alongside the other three District 44 incumbents, Fleischauer placed second in the five-way May 8, 2012 Democratic Primary with 5,226 votes (24.5%), and placed third in the eleven-way five-position November 6, 2012 General election with 14,381 votes (10.8%), behind incumbent Democratic Representative Charlene Marshall, former Republican Representative Cindy Frich, and ahead of incumbent Representatives Amanda Pasdon and Anthony Barill and non-selectees Republican nominee Kevin Poe (who had run for a District 44 seat in 2010), Democratic nominees Nancy Jamison and Billy Smerka, Republican nominees John Woods and Jay Redmond, and American Third Position candidate Harry Bertram, who had run for governor in 2011.
- 1990s & Early 2000s Fleischauer was initially elected to a District 44 seat in the 1994 Democratic Primary and November 8, 1994, General election, and was re-elected in the general election of November 5, 1996.
- 1998 Fleischauer placed in the seven-way Democratic Primary and was re-elected in the eight-way four-position November 3, 1998 General election with nominees Sheirl Fletcher (R), Charlene Marshall (D), and Nancy Houston (D).
- 2000 Fleischauer placed in the six-way 2000 Democratic Primary and was re-elected in the seven-way four position November 7, 2000 with incumbent Representatives Fletcher (R) and Marshall (D) and Democratic nominee Robert Beach, unseating Representative Houston (D).
- 2002 When Representative Marshall ran for West Virginia Senate and Representative Fletcher left the Legislature leaving two district seats open, Fleischauer placed in the nine-way 2002 Democratic Primary and was re-elected in the seven-way four-position November 5, 2002 General election with incumbent Representative Beach (D), returning Representative Houston, and Republican nominee Cindy Frich.
- 2004 Fleischauer placed in the five-way 2004 Democratic Primary but lost the eight-way four-position November 2, 2004 General election which re-elected incumbent Representatives Beach (D), Frich (R), and Houston (D), and reseated former Representative Marshall (D).
- 2006 When Representative Houston left the Legislature and left a district seat open, Fleischauer placed in the six-way 2006 Democratic Primary and was re-elected in the eight-way four-position November 7, 2006 General election alongside incumbent Democratic Representatives Beach (D) and Marshall(D) and Democratic nominee Alex Shook.
- 2008 Fleischauer placed second in the five-way May 13, 2008 Democratic Primary with 8,933 votes (23.5%), and placed fourth in the six-way four-position November 4, 2008 General election with 16,061 votes (17.8%) behind incumbent Democratic Representatives Shook, Marshall, and Beach.
- 2010 When Representative Robert Beach ran for West Virginia Senate and left a seat open, Fleischauer placed second in the six-way May 11, 2010 Democratic Primary with 4,819 votes (22.6%), and placed second in the ten-way four-position November 2, 2010 General election with 9,736 votes (12.5%) behind incumbent Democratic Representative Charlene Marshall and ahead of Republican nominee Amanda Pasdon, Democratic nominee Anthony Barill, and non-selectees Chris Walters (R), Stephen Cook (D), Kevin Poe (R), Kevin Patrick (R), Paul Brown (I), and Tad Britch (L).
