= Amanda Pasdon =

American politician

Member of the West Virginia House of Delegates from the 51st district
- In office January 12, 2011 – January 1, 2016

Member of the West Virginia House of Delegates from the 44th district
- In office January 2011 – January 2013
- Preceded by: Alex Shook

Personal details
- Party: Republican
- Education: West Virginia University
- Website: amandapasdon.com

Amanda Brooke Pasdon is an American politician who was a Republican member of the West Virginia House of Delegates representing District 51 from January 12, 2013 to 2016. Pasdon served consecutively from January 2011 until January 2013 in the District 44 seat.

== Education ==
Pasdon earned her MBA from West Virginia University.

== Elections ==
- 2012 Redistricted to District 51 alongside the other three District 44 incumbents, Pasdon ran in the seven-way May 8, 2012 Republican Primary and placed second with 2,453 votes (18.1%), and placed fourth in the eleven-way five-position November 6, 2012 General election with 13,542 votes (10.8%), behind incumbent Democratic Representative Charlene Marshall, former Representative Cindy Frich, and incumbent Representative Barbara Fleischauer, and ahead of incumbent Representative Anthony Barill and non-selectees fellow Republican nominee Kevin Poe (who had run for a District 44 seat in 2010), Democratic nominees Nancy Jamison and Billy Smerka, Republican nominees John Woods and Jay Redmond, and American Third Position candidate Harry Bertram, who had run for governor in 2011.
- 2010 When District 44 incumbent Democratic Representative Robert Beach ran for West Virginia Senate and left a seat open, Pasdon ran in the five-way May 11, 2010 Republican Primary, placing first with 1,950 votes (23.6%), and placed third in the ten-way four-position November 2, 2010 General election with 9,736 votes (12.5%) behind incumbent Democratic Representatives Charlene Marshall and Barbara Fleischauer, and ahead of Democratic nominee Anthony Barill and non-selectees Chris Walters (R), Stephen Cook (D), Kevin Poe (R), Kevin Patrick (R), Paul Brown (I), and Tad Britch (L).
