= John Williams (West Virginia politician) =

American politician

Member of the West Virginia House of Delegates from the 51st district
- Incumbent
- Assumed office December 1, 2016 Serving with Barbara Fleischauer, Evan Hansen, Joe Statler, and Danielle Walker
- Preceded by: Brian Kurcaba
- Succeeded by: Olivia Miller (elect)

Personal details
- Born: May 24, 1990 (age 36) Morgantown, West Virginia, U.S.
- Party: Democratic
- Education: West Virginia University
- Occupation: Politician, financial representative
- Website: www.williamsforstatesenate.com

John Williams (born May 24, 1990) is an American politician, currently serving as a Democratic member of the West Virginia House of Delegates, representing the 80th district (51st district prior to redistricting).

== Personal life ==
Williams was born on May 24, 1990, in Morgantown, West Virginia to Jacques and Janet Williams. He obtained a bachelor's degree from West Virginia University.

== Career ==
In 2018, Democrats, including Williams, swept all five seats in the 51st district, the largest multi-member district in the House. As a result, the Monongalia County delegates, all Democrats, called themselves “The Fab Five” and frequently voted and worked together on bills. This was especially notable given that there was only one Democratic member of the delegation just four years earlier, after the 2014 elections. In 2020, fellow Delegate Rodney Pyles was defeated for re-election by former Republican Delegate Joe Statler, breaking the all-Democratic delegation.

In 2026, Williams defeated Mike Oliverio, claiming the senate seat of West Virginia's 13th district.

== Electoral history ==
=== 2018 election ===
==== Primary election ====
West Virginia House of Delegates, 2018 Monongalia County, 51st District (Vote for 5)
Party	Candidate	Votes	%
Democratic	Barbara Evans Fleischauer (incumbent)	6,116	21.54%
Democratic	Evan Hansen	5,639	19.86%
Democratic	Danielle Walker	5,104	17.98%
Democratic	John Williams (incumbent)	4,994	17.59%
Democratic	Rodney Pyles (incumbent)	3,952	13.92%
Democratic	Cory Kennedy	2,585	9.11%
Total votes		28,390	100.00%

==== General election ====
West Virginia House of Delegates, 2018 Monongalia County, 51st District (Vote for 5)
Party	Candidate	Votes	%
Democratic	Barbara Evans Fleischauer (incumbent)	16,357	12.21%
Democratic	Evan Hansen	15,558	11.62%
Democratic	John Williams (incumbent)	15,045	11.23%
Democratic	Danielle Walker	14,725	10.99%
Democratic	Rodney Pyles (incumbent)	14,240	10.63%
Republican	Joe Statler (incumbent)	13,051	9.74%
Republican	Cindy Frich (incumbent)	12,601	9.41%
Republican	Debbie Warner	11,058	8.26%
Republican	Roger Shuttlesworth	8,885	6.63%
Republican	Aaron Metz	8,464	6.32%
Libertarian	Buddy Guthrie	3,011	2.25%
American Freedom	Harry Bertram	942	0.70%
Write-in		79	0.06%
Total votes		134,016	100.00%

=== 2020 election ===
==== Primary election ====
West Virginia House of Delegates, 2020 Monongalia County, 51st District (Vote for 5)
Party	Candidate	Votes	%
Democratic	Danielle Walker (incumbent)	9,685	20.65%
Democratic	Barbara Evans Fleischauer (incumbent)	9,626	20.52%
Democratic	Evan Hansen (incumbent)	9,300	19.83%
Democratic	John Williams (incumbent)	8,065	17.19%
Democratic	Rodney Pyles (incumbent)	6,889	14.69%
Democratic	Jeffrey Budkey	3,343	7.13%
Total votes		46,908	100.00%

==== General election ====
West Virginia House of Delegates, 2020 Monongalia County, 51st District (Vote for 5)
Party	Candidate	Votes	%
Democratic	Barbara Evans Fleischauer (incumbent)	19,718	11.84%
Democratic	Evan Hansen (incumbent)	18,800	11.29%
Republican	Joe Statler	18,304	10.99%
Democratic	Danielle Walker (incumbent)	17,931	10.77%
Democratic	John Williams (incumbent)	17,737	10.65%
Republican	Cindy Frich	17,704	10.63%
Democratic	Rodney Pyles (incumbent)	17,689	10.63%
Republican	Justin White	14,187	8.52%
Republican	Todd Stainbrook	12,204	7.33%
Republican	Zach Lemaire	12,134	7.29%
Write-in		71	0.04%
Total votes		166,479	100.00%
