= West Virginia's 13th Senate district =

American legislative district

West Virginia's 13th State Senate district
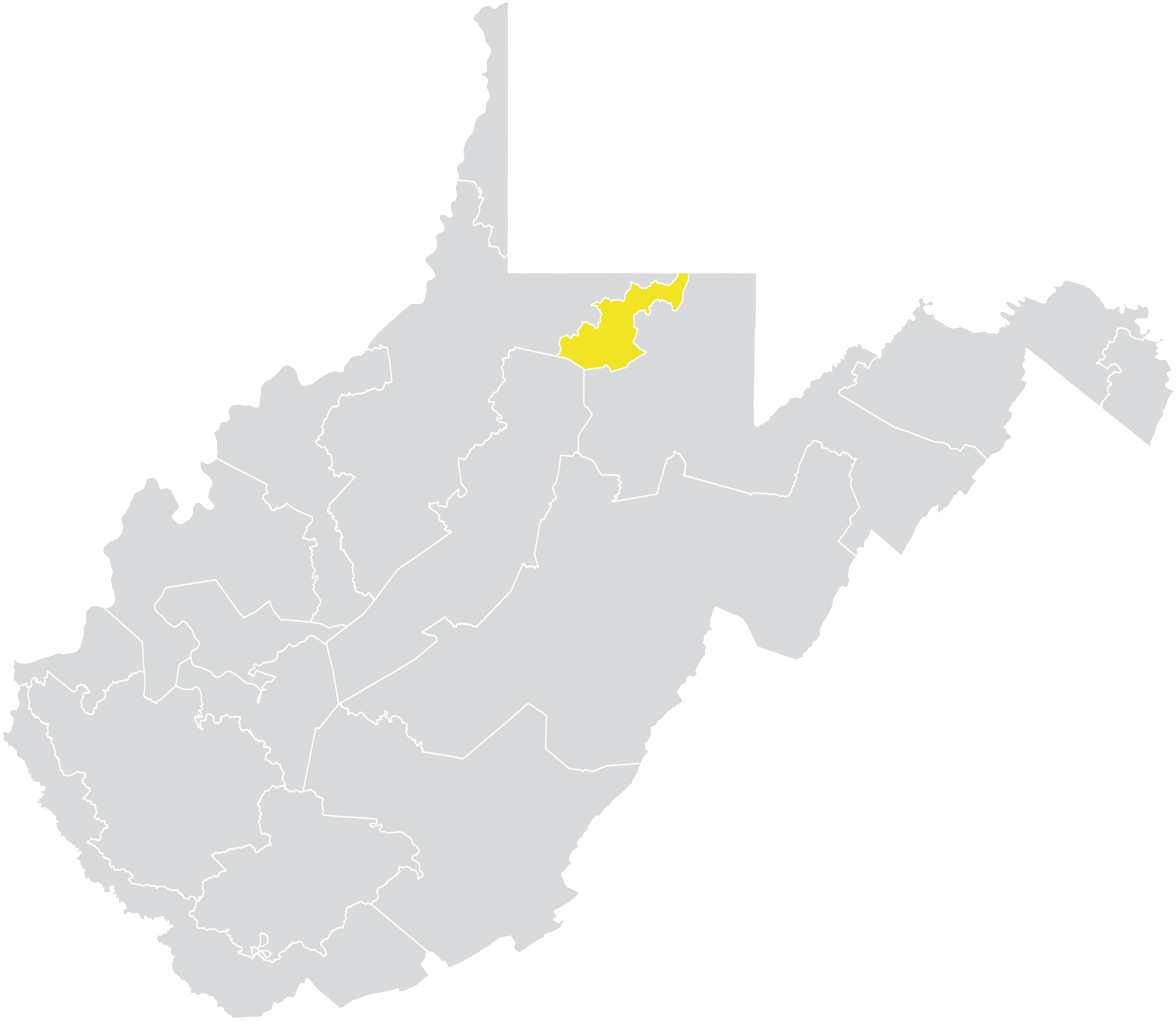
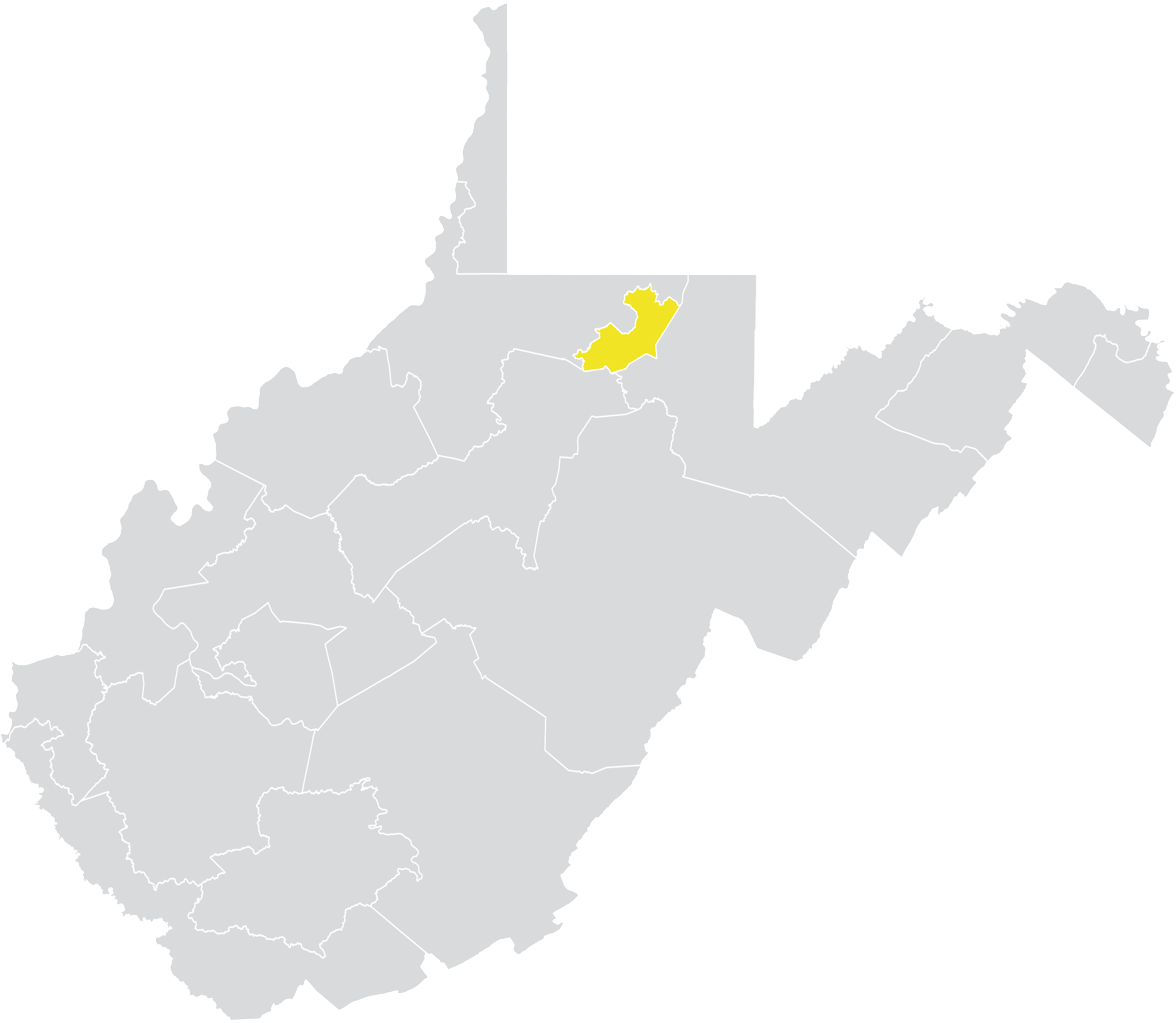
Senator
Mike Oliverio; R–Morgantown
Joey Garcia; D–Fairmont
- Demographics: 88% White; 4% Black; 2% Hispanic; 3% Asian; 2% Other
- Population (2017): 118,123

West Virginia's 13th Senate district is one of 17 districts in the West Virginia Senate. It is currently represented by Republican Mike Oliverio and Democrat Joey Garcia. All districts in the West Virginia Senate elect two members to staggered four-year terms.

== Geography ==
District 13 is based in the city of Morgantown, covering parts of Marion and Monongalia Counties. Other communities in the district include Fairmont, Pleasant Valley, Barrackville, Monongah, Star City, Westover, and Cheat Lake.

The district is located entirely within West Virginia's 1st congressional district, and overlaps with the 49th, 50th, and 51st districts of the West Virginia House of Delegates. At around 260 square miles, it is the smallest district in the Senate. It borders the state of Pennsylvania.

== Recent election results ==
=== 2024 ===
2024 West Virginia Senate election, District 13
Primary election
Party	Candidate	Votes	%
Democratic	Joey Garcia	7,570	100.0
Total votes		7,570	100.0
Republican	Jonathan Board	6,918	100.0
Total votes		6,918	100.0
General election
Democratic	Joey Garcia	21,890	54.4
Republican	Rebecca Polis	18,321	45.6
Total votes		40,211	100
Democratic hold			

Polis replaced Board on the ballot after Board suspended his campaign to become the executive director of the West Virginia First Foundation.

=== 2022 ===
2022 West Virginia Senate election, District 13
Primary election
Party	Candidate	Votes	%
Democratic	Barbara Fleischauer	5,346	82.5
Democratic	Rich Jacobs	1,134	17.5
Total votes		6,480	100
Republican	Mike Oliverio	4,512	80.4
Republican	Carly Braun	1,099	19.6
Total votes		5,611	100
General election
Republican	Mike Oliverio	13,495	50.3
Democratic	Barbara Fleischauer	13,342	49.7
Total votes		26,837	100

== Historical election results ==
=== 2020 ===
2020 West Virginia Senate election, District 13
Primary election
Party	Candidate	Votes	%
Republican	Rebecca Polis	4,275	58.1
Republican	John Provins	3,089	41.9
Total votes		7,364	100
General election
Democratic	Mike Caputo	26,095	56.2
Republican	Rebecca Polis	20,321	43.8
Total votes		46,416	100
Democratic hold			

=== 2018 ===
2018 West Virginia Senate election, District 13
Party	Candidate	Votes	%
Democratic	Bob Beach (incumbent)	18,692	52.2
Republican	Mike Oliverio	17,129	47.8
Total votes		35,821	100
Democratic hold			

=== 2016 ===
2016 West Virginia Senate election, District 13
Primary election
Party	Candidate	Votes	%
Democratic	Roman Prezioso (incumbent)	10,433	59.6
Democratic	Jack Oliver	7,078	40.4
Total votes		17,511	100
Republican	Barry Bledsoe	4,615	58.2
Republican	James Clawson	3,318	41.8
Total votes		7,933	100
General election
Democratic	Roman Prezioso (incumbent)	24,404	59.6
Republican	Barry Bledsoe	16,544	40.4
Total votes		40,948	100
Democratic hold			

=== 2014 ===
2014 West Virginia Senate election, District 13
Party	Candidate	Votes	%
Democratic	Bob Beach (incumbent)	12,055	51.5
Republican	Kris Warner	10,589	45.2
American Third Position	Harry Bertram	767	3.3
Total votes		23,411	100
Democratic hold			

=== 2012 ===
2012 West Virginia Senate election, District 13
Party	Candidate	Votes	%
Democratic	Roman Prezioso (incumbent)	23,211	63.1
Republican	Casey Mayer	13,549	36.9
Total votes		36,760	100
Democratic hold			

=== Federal and statewide results ===
Year	Office	Results
2020	President	Trump 51.2 – 46.3%
2016	President	Trump 52.8 – 39.6%
2014	Senate	Capito 51.3 – 44.8%
2012	President	Romney 52.3 – 45.2%
2012	Senate	Manchin 58.3 – 37.6%
2012	Governor	Tomblin 50.1 – 44.6%
