= Bob Beach =

American politician

Member of the West Virginia Senate from the 13th district
- In office December 1, 2010 – December 1, 2022
- Preceded by: Mike Oliverio
- Succeeded by: Mike Oliverio

Member of the West Virginia House of Delegates from the 44th district
- In office December 1, 2000 – December 1, 2010
- Preceded by: Nancy Houston
- Succeeded by: Anthony Barill
- In office April 24, 1998 – December 1, 1998
- Preceded by: Robert C. Beach
- Succeeded by: Sheirl Fletcher; Nancy Houston; Charlene Marshall

Personal details
- Born: July 21, 1959 (age 67) Morgantown, West Virginia, U.S.
- Party: Democratic
- Spouse: Rachel Plybon
- Children: 5
- Education: Fairmont State University

Robert D. Beach (born July 21, 1959) is an American politician who served as a Democratic member of the West Virginia State Senate representing District 13 from 2010 to 2022. Beach was also the Democratic nominee for West Virginia Commissioner of Agriculture in 2020. Beach served consecutively in the West Virginia Legislature's House of Delegates from December 2000 until December 2010, and non-consecutively from his May 1998 appointment to fill the vacancy caused by the passing of his father, the late Delegate Robert C. Beach, until December 3, 1998, in the West Virginia House of Delegates within the 44 Delegate District.

Senator Beach has served in a variety of legislative positions; including Chairman of Agriculture and Transportation Committee, member of the Legislative Oversight Commission on Education Accountability and the WV Holocaust Education Commission. Beach currently serves on the Agriculture and Rural Development, Banking and Insurance, Education, Judiciary, Natural Resources, and Transportation and Infrastructure committees.

== Education ==
Beach attended Fairmont State College -Spruce School of Real Estate - Andrew Young School of Leadership Studies.

== Elections ==
=== 2020 ===
Senator Beach ran for West Virginia Commissioner of Agriculture in 2020, seeking to challenge incumbent Republican Commissioner and former state senator Kent Leonhardt. Beach won the Democratic nomination with a plurality of the vote (48.0%) over fellow farmers William Keplinger and Dave Miller. However, Beach lost the November general election to Leonhardt 65% to 35%.

2020 Commissioner of Agriculture General election
Party	Candidate	Votes	%
Republican	Kent Leonhardt (incumbent)	480,386	64.98%
Democratic	Bob Beach	258,912	35.02%
Total votes		739,298	100.0%

2020 Commissioner of Agriculture Democratic primary
Party	Candidate	Votes	%
Democratic	Bob Beach	81,074	48.0%
Democratic	William Keplinger	44,084	26.1%
Democratic	Dave Miller	43,916	26.0%
Total votes		169,074	100.0%

=== 2018 ===
Beach captured the May Democratic Primary Nomination after running unopposed. On November 6, 2018, Robert Beach defeated challenger Republican candidate and former WV State Senator Michael Oliverio in the general election.

2018 West Virginia's 13th Senate district General election
Party	Candidate	Votes	%
Democratic	Bob Beach (incumbent)	18,692	52.18%
Republican	Mike Oliverio	17,129	47.82%
Total votes		35,821	100%

=== 2014 ===
Beach captured the May Democratic Primary Nomination after being unopposed. On November 4, 2014, Beach defeated challenger and former West Virginia Republican Party Chairman Kris Warner in the general election.

2014 West Virginia's 13th Senate district General election
Party	Candidate	Votes	%
Democratic	Bob Beach (incumbent)	12,061	51.49%
Republican	Kris Warner	17,129	45.24%
American Freedom	Harry Bertram	767	3.27%
Total votes		23,424	100%

=== 2010 ===
When 13th Senate District Democratic Senator Mike Oliverio challenged incumbent Alan Mollohan for the Democratic nomination to the United States House of Representatives in West Virginia's 1st congressional district, he vacated his state senate seat. Beach immediately filed for the 13th Senate District seat and captured the Democratic Primary nomination with 5,443 votes (71.8%), and narrowly won the November 2, 2010 General election with 16,882 votes (50.3%) against Republican state Delegate Cindy Frich.

2010 West Virginia's 13th Senate district General election
Party	Candidate	Votes	%
Democratic	Bob Beach	16,882	50.31%
Republican	Cindy Frich	16,676	49.69%
Total votes		33,558	100%

2010 West Virginia's 13th Senate district Democratic Primary
Party	Candidate	Votes	%
Democratic	Bob Beach	5,443	71.78%
Democratic	Ronald Paul Justice	2,140	28.22%
Total votes		7,583	100.0%

=== 2008 ===
Beach again captured the Democratic Primary nomination to the West Virginia House of Delegates with 7,139 votes (18.8%) on May 13, 2008. Beach was re-elected to a fifth term after finishing third (out of fourth) in the November 4, 2008 General election with 16,168 votes (17.9%) behind incumbent Delegates Alex Shook and Charlene Marshall, and ahead of Delegate Barbara Fleischauer.

=== 2006 ===
When Delegate Houston retired from the Legislature and left a district seat open, Beach again captured the 2006 Democratic Primary nomination to the West Virginia House of Delegates. He was re-elected to a fourth term during the November 7, 2006 General election alongside incumbent Charlene Marshall (D), returning Delegate Barbara Fleischauer, and Democratic nominee Alex Shook.

=== 2004 ===
Beach won the 2004 Democratic Primary nomination to the West Virginia House of Delegates and was re-elected on November 2, 2004. Beach was re-elected alongside incumbents Cindy Frich (R), Houston (D), and former Delegate Charlene Marshall (D), who unseated Delegate Barbara Fleischauer (D).

=== 2002 ===
When Delegate Charlene Marshall ran for the West Virginia State Senate and Delegate Fletcher left the Legislature, two district seats were opened in the multi-member district. Beach again captured the 2002 Democratic Primary nomination to the West Virginia House of Delegates and was re-elected on November 5, 2002, leading the general election ticket followed by incumbents Delegate Barbara Fleischauer (D), returning Delegate Houston, and Republican nominee Cindy Frich.

=== 2000 ===
Beach won the Democratic Primary nomination to the West Virginia House of Delegates and was elected during the November 7, 2000 General election alongside incumbents Delegates Barbara Fleischauer (D), Fletcher (R), and Charlene Marshall (D), and unseating Delegate Houston (D) in the multi-member district.

Party political offices
Preceded by Walt Helmick	Democratic nominee for Agriculture Commissioner of West Virginia; 2020	Succeeded by Deborah Stiles
