= Joe Statler =

American politician

Member of the West Virginia House of Delegates from the 51st district
- Incumbent
- Assumed office December 1, 2020 Serving with Barbara Fleischauer, Evan Hansen, Danielle Walker and John Williams
- In office December 1, 2014 – December 1, 2018

Personal details
- Born: December 8, 1952 (age 73) Morgantown, West Virginia, U.S.
- Party: Republican
- Education: Clay-Battelle High School
- Occupation: Politician, Farmer
- Website: https://statler4house.com

Joe Statler (born December 8, 1952) is an American politician, currently serving as a Republican member of the West Virginia House of Delegates since 2020, representing the 51st district, which includes Morgantown and the majority of Monongalia County. Statler also served in the House from 2014 to 2018, losing reelection in the 2018 elections.

As of 2021, Statler is the only Republican in the five-member 51st District.

== Personal life ==
Statler was born on December 8, 1952, in Morgantown, West Virginia to Willis and Maxine Statler. He is a graduate of Clay-Battelle High School. Statler is a retired coal miner and owns a 250-acre farm in Core, West Virginia. Prior to his service in the Legislature, Statler served on the Monongalia County Board of Education from 2002 to 2012.

== Electoral history ==
=== 2018 election ===
==== General election ====
West Virginia House of Delegates, 2018 Monongalia County, 51st District (Vote for 5)
Party	Candidate	Votes	%
Democratic	Barbara Evans Fleischauer (incumbent)	16,357	12.21%
Democratic	Evan Hansen	15,558	11.62%
Democratic	John Williams (incumbent)	15,045	11.23%
Democratic	Danielle Walker	14,725	10.99%
Democratic	Rodney Pyles (incumbent)	14,240	10.63%
Republican	Joe Statler(incumbent)	13,051	9.74%
Republican	Cindy Frich (incumbent)	12,601	9.41%
Republican	Debbie Warner	11,058	8.26%
Republican	Roger Shuttlesworth	8,885	6.63%
Republican	Aaron Metz	8,464	6.32%
Libertarian	Buddy Guthrie	3,011	2.25%
American Freedom	Harry Bertram	942	0.70%
Write-in		79	0.06%
Total votes		134,016	100.00%

=== 2020 election ===
==== General election ====
West Virginia House of Delegates, 2020 Monongalia County, 51st District (Vote for 5)
Party	Candidate	Votes	%
Democratic	Barbara Evans Fleischauer (incumbent)	19,718	11.84%
Democratic	Evan Hansen (incumbent)	18,800	11.29%
Republican	Joe Statler	18,304	10.99%
Democratic	Danielle Walker (incumbent)	17,931	10.77%
Democratic	John Williams (incumbent)	17,737	10.65%
Republican	Cindy Frich	17,704	10.63%
Democratic	Rodney Pyles (incumbent)	17,689	10.63%
Republican	Justin White	14,187	8.52%
Republican	Todd Stainbrook	12,204	7.33%
Republican	Zach Lemaire	12,134	7.29%
Write-in		71	0.04%
Total votes		166,479	100.00%
