= Danielle Walker (politician) =

American politician (born 1976)

Vice Chair of the West Virginia Democratic Party
- In office June 18, 2022 – April, 2023
- Preceded by: William Laird IV
- Succeeded by: Teresa Toriseva

Member of the West Virginia House of Delegates
- In office December 1, 2018 – April 11, 2023
- Preceded by: Cindy Frich
- Succeeded by: Anitra Hamilton
- Constituency: 51st district (2018–2022); 81st district (2022–2023)

Personal details
- Born: August 18, 1976 (age 50) New Iberia, Louisiana, U.S.
- Party: Democratic
- Education: Teche Area Technical Institute; University of Southwestern Louisiana
- Occupation: Politician, community activist

Danielle Walker (born August 18, 1976) is an American politician and community activist, who served as a Democratic member of the West Virginia House of Delegates from 2018 until her resignation in 2023. Through her tenure, Walker was the only Black woman serving in the West Virginia Legislature. In June 2022, Walker was elected vice chair of the West Virginia Democratic Party, she later resigned as vice chairwoman after her selection as the leader of the American Civil Liberties Union of West Virginia.

== Career ==
=== Political career ===
In response to the terrorist attack perpetrated on counter-protesters of the Unite the Right rally in Charlottesville, Virginia, Walker attended a vigil with her oldest son, which was held on the campus of West Virginia University. Her son, then a student of WVU, had previously considered attending the University of Virginia, located in Charlottesville. Walker has stated that she felt compelled to speak out against the alt-right movement at the vigil, after thinking of the potential that her son could have been a victim of the attack, should he have chosen to ultimately attend UVA. Members of the local Democratic Party, impressed by Walker's speech, later recruited her to run as a candidate for the West Virginia House of Delegates' 51st district. Walker accepted the proposition and won election in November 2018.

In 2018, Democrats — including Walker — swept all five seats in the 51st district, the largest multi-member district in the House. As a result, the Monongalia County delegates, all Democrats, called themselves "The Fab Five" and frequently voted and worked together on bills. This was especially notable given that there was only one Democratic member of the delegation just four years earlier, after the 2014 elections. In 2020, fellow Delegate Rodney Pyles was defeated for re-election by former Republican Delegate Joe Statler, breaking the all-Democratic delegation. She was re-elected to a second term in November 2020, and to a third term in November 2022 in the 81st district following redistricting. In 2023, Walker resigned from the House of Delegates after her selection as the leader of the American Civil Liberties Union of West Virginia.

=== Online harassment ===
In February 2022, the group Berkeley County West Virginians for Life posted a meme with the image of a hooded-Klansman on their Facebook page, directly addressing Delegate Walker in the post. The same image and message were sent to her email the same day, February 1, the first day of Black History Month and the day after she introduced a bill meant to ensure abortion rights. Walker said, "For a Black woman, the only Black woman currently in both houses in the state of West Virginia, on the first day of Black history month to receive this hate mail is beyond my understanding," adding, "I am not ally to any white supremacist. But in that same breath, I do love all my neighbors. No one shall place hate in my heart. That is not who I am." Berkeley County WVFL president Richard Demoske resigned following backlash to the incident.

Comparing the incident to a "modern-day digital version of burning a cross in [her] front yard," Delegate Walker filed a civil lawsuit in Kanawha County Circuit Court against Desmoske and WVFL on February 15, 2022. On September 19, 2022, Walker refiled suit in Monongalia County Circuit Court after her case in Kanawha County was dismissed due to improper venue.

=== Community involvement ===
Walker is a member and supporter of several organizations, including Black Lives Matter; the NAACP; Mountaineers for Progress, an organization promoting progressive values throughout the state; the National Organization for Women; Moms Clean Air Force, an environmental protection organization; Planned Parenthood; the Working Families Party; Our Future West Virginia, a statewide organization focused on economic justice, educational justice, racial justice, and civic engagement; Mon County Read Aloud, an organization focused on improving childhood literacy; Mountain Mamas, a women's climate change advocacy and environmental protection organization; MoveOn; and the Sierra Club.

== Personal life ==
Walker was born on August 18, 1976, in New Iberia, Louisiana, to Oscar Walker Sr. and Derbie Bernard. After graduating from New Iberia Senior High School, Walker attended Teche Area Technical Institute, where she obtained a certificate in accounting; she also completed undergraduate coursework at the University of Southwestern Louisiana, however, did not obtain a degree.

Widowed at just 29-years-old, Walker remarried and moved with her two sons to Morgantown, West Virginia, after her husband was relocated for his job. After the move, the two divorced, although Walker would choose to remain in Morgantown with her children. As a single mother raising two disabled children, Walker was chosen to receive her own universal-designed home through Habitat for Humanity in 2015; she has remained an advocate of the organization since. In June 2021, just shy of his 24th birthday, Walker's eldest son, Demetry, died from leukemia.

In February 2021, Walker came out as queer during a press conference in support of the Fairness Act, which would add sexual orientation and gender identity as protected classes in West Virginia's Human Rights Act and the Fair Housing Act. Walker is the second openly LGBTQ+ woman to serve in the Legislature after former delegate Amanda Estep-Burton.

== Electoral history ==
=== 2020 election ===
==== Primary election ====
West Virginia House of Delegates, 2020 Monongalia County, 51st District (Vote for 5)
Party	Candidate	Votes	%
Democratic	Danielle Walker (incumbent)	9,685	20.65%
Democratic	Barbara Evans Fleischauer (incumbent)	9,626	20.52%
Democratic	Evan Hansen (incumbent)	9,300	19.83%
Democratic	John Williams (incumbent)	8,065	17.19%
Democratic	Rodney Pyles (incumbent)	6,889	14.69%
Democratic	Jeffrey Budkey	3,343	7.13%
Total votes		46,908	100.00%

==== General election ====
West Virginia House of Delegates, 2020 Monongalia County, 51st District (Vote for 5)
Party	Candidate	Votes	%
Democratic	Barbara Evans Fleischauer (incumbent)	19,718	11.84%
Democratic	Evan Hansen (incumbent)	18,800	11.29%
Republican	Joe Statler	18,304	10.99%
Democratic	Danielle Walker (incumbent)	17,931	10.77%
Democratic	John Williams (incumbent)	17,737	10.65%
Republican	Cindy Frich	17,704	10.63%
Democratic	Rodney Pyles (incumbent)	17,689	10.63%
Republican	Justin White	14,187	8.52%
Republican	Todd Stainbrook	12,204	7.33%
Republican	Zach Lemaire	12,134	7.29%
Write-in		71	0.04%
Total votes		166,479	100.00%

=== 2018 election ===
==== Primary election ====
West Virginia House of Delegates, 2018 Monongalia County, 51st District (Vote for 5)
Party	Candidate	Votes	%
Democratic	Barbara Evans Fleischauer (incumbent)	6,116	21.54%
Democratic	Evan Hansen	5,639	19.86%
Democratic	Danielle Walker	5,104	17.98%
Democratic	John Williams (incumbent)	4,994	17.59%
Democratic	Rodney Pyles (incumbent)	3,952	13.92%
Democratic	Cory Kennedy	2,585	9.11%
Total votes		28,390	100.00%

==== General election ====
West Virginia House of Delegates, 2018 Monongalia County, 51st District (Vote for 5)
Party	Candidate	Votes	%
Democratic	Barbara Evans Fleischauer (incumbent)	16,357	12.21%
Democratic	Evan Hansen	15,558	11.62%
Democratic	John Williams (incumbent)	15,045	11.23%
Democratic	Danielle Walker	14,725	10.99%
Democratic	Rodney Pyles (incumbent)	14,240	10.63%
Republican	Joe Statler (incumbent)	13,051	9.74%
Republican	Cindy Frich (incumbent)	12,601	9.41%
Republican	Debbie Warner	11,058	8.26%
Republican	Roger Shuttlesworth	8,885	6.63%
Republican	Aaron Metz	8,464	6.32%
Libertarian	Buddy Guthrie	3,011	2.25%
American Freedom	Harry Bertram	942	0.70%
Write-in		79	0.06%
Total votes		134,016	100.00%
