= Evan Hansen (politician) =

American politician (born 1966)

Member of the West Virginia House of Delegates from the 51st district
- Incumbent
- Assumed office December 1, 2018 Serving with Barbara Fleischauer, Joe Statler, Danielle Walker and John Williams

Personal details
- Born: July 22, 1966 (age 60) Newark, New Jersey, U.S.
- Party: Democratic
- Education: B.S. in Computer Science and Engineering, Massachusetts Institute of Technology; M.S. in Energy and Resources, University of California, Berkeley
- Occupation: Politician, Scientist, Business owner
- Website: https://www.hansenforwv.com

Evan Hansen (born July 22, 1966) is an American politician, currently serving as a Democratic member of the West Virginia House of Delegates since 2018, representing the 51st district, which includes Morgantown and the majority of Monongalia County.

== Politics ==
Hansen was first elected to the House during the 2018 elections, which saw Democrats gain in both chambers of the West Virginia Legislature.

Hansen was an unsuccessful candidate for the House in the 2016 elections, coming in sixth place behind Democrat Barbara Evans Fleischauer, Republican Cindy Frich, Republican Joe Statler, Democrat John Williams, and Democrat Rodney Pyles in the five-member 51st District.

In 2018, Democrats — including Hansen — swept all five seats in the 51st district, the largest multi-member district in the House. As a result, the Monongalia County delegates, all Democrats, called themselves “The Fab Five” and frequently voted and worked together on bills. This was especially notable given that there was only one Democratic member of the delegation just four years earlier, after the 2014 elections. In 2020, fellow Delegate Rodney Pyles was defeated for re-election by former Republican Delegate Joe Statler, breaking the all-Democratic delegation.

== Personal life ==
Hansen was born on July 22, 1966, in Newark, New Jersey to Eleanor and Edwin Hansen. He obtained a B.S. in Computer Science and Engineering from Massachusetts Institute of Technology and an M.S. in Energy and Resources, University of California-Berkeley. Hansen is also Jewish.

Hansen is co-owner of Downstream Strategies in Morgantown, which works with government agencies, cities, counties, and nonprofits on projects related to drinking water protection, energy development, and local economic development. Hansen has lived in Morgantown since 1997.

== Electoral history ==
=== 2018 election ===
==== Primary election ====
West Virginia House of Delegates, 2018 Monongalia County, 51st District (Vote for 5)
Party	Candidate	Votes	%
Democratic	Barbara Evans Fleischauer (incumbent)	6,116	21.54%
Democratic	Evan Hansen	5,639	19.86%
Democratic	Danielle Walker	5,104	17.98%
Democratic	John Williams (incumbent)	4,994	17.59%
Democratic	Rodney Pyles (incumbent)	3,952	13.92%
Democratic	Cory Kennedy	2,585	9.11%
Total votes		28,390	100.00%

==== General election ====
West Virginia House of Delegates, 2018 Monongalia County, 51st District (Vote for 5)
Party	Candidate	Votes	%
Democratic	Barbara Evans Fleischauer (incumbent)	16,357	12.21%
Democratic	Evan Hansen	15,558	11.62%
Democratic	John Williams (incumbent)	15,045	11.23%
Democratic	Danielle Walker	14,725	10.99%
Democratic	Rodney Pyles (incumbent)	14,240	10.63%
Republican	Joe Statler (incumbent)	13,051	9.74%
Republican	Cindy Frich (incumbent)	12,601	9.41%
Republican	Debbie Warner	11,058	8.26%
Republican	Roger Shuttlesworth	8,885	6.63%
Republican	Aaron Metz	8,464	6.32%
Libertarian	Buddy Guthrie	3,011	2.25%
American Freedom	Harry Bertram	942	0.70%
Write-in		79	0.06%
Total votes		134,016	100.00%

=== 2020 election ===
==== Primary election ====
West Virginia House of Delegates, 2020 Monongalia County, 51st District (Vote for 5)
Party	Candidate	Votes	%
Democratic	Danielle Walker (incumbent)	9,685	20.65%
Democratic	Barbara Evans Fleischauer (incumbent)	9,626	20.52%
Democratic	Evan Hansen (incumbent)	9,300	19.83%
Democratic	John Williams (incumbent)	8,065	17.19%
Democratic	Rodney Pyles (incumbent)	6,889	14.69%
Democratic	Jeffrey Budkey	3,343	7.13%
Total votes		46,908	100.00%

==== General election ====
West Virginia House of Delegates, 2020 Monongalia County, 51st District (Vote for 5)
Party	Candidate	Votes	%
Democratic	Barbara Evans Fleischauer (incumbent)	19,718	11.84%
Democratic	Evan Hansen (incumbent)	18,800	11.29%
Republican	Joe Statler	18,304	10.99%
Democratic	Danielle Walker (incumbent)	17,931	10.77%
Democratic	John Williams (incumbent)	17,737	10.65%
Republican	Cindy Frich	17,704	10.63%
Democratic	Rodney Pyles (incumbent)	17,689	10.63%
Republican	Justin White	14,187	8.52%
Republican	Todd Stainbrook	12,204	7.33%
Republican	Zach Lemaire	12,134	7.29%
Write-in		71	0.04%
Total votes		166,479	100.00%
