= Brian Kurcaba =

American politician

Member of the West Virginia House of Delegates from the 51st district
- In office December 1, 2014 – December 1, 2016
- Preceded by: Charlene Marshall
- Succeeded by: Rodney Pyles

Personal details
- Born: October 25, 1976 (age 49)
- Party: Republican

Brian Kurcaba (born October 25, 1976) is an American politician who served in the West Virginia House of Delegates from the 51st district from 2014 to 2016.
