= Evan Hansen (disambiguation) =

Evan Hansen is the titular fictional character in the Dear Evan Hansen stage musical and film.

Evan Hansen may also refer to:

- Evan Hansen (politician), born 1966, West Virginia legislator

== See also ==
- Dear Evan Hansen, stage musical about the fictional character
- Dear Evan Hansen (film), adaptation of the stage play
