= Olivia Miller =

American politician

Member-elect of the West Virginia House of Delegates from the 80th district
- Assuming office December 2026
- Succeeding: John Williams

Personal details
- Party: Democratic

Olivia Miller is an American politician. A member of the Democratic Party, she is the member-elect for the 80th district of the West Virginia House of Delegates.
