= Fourteen Words =

White-supremacist slogans

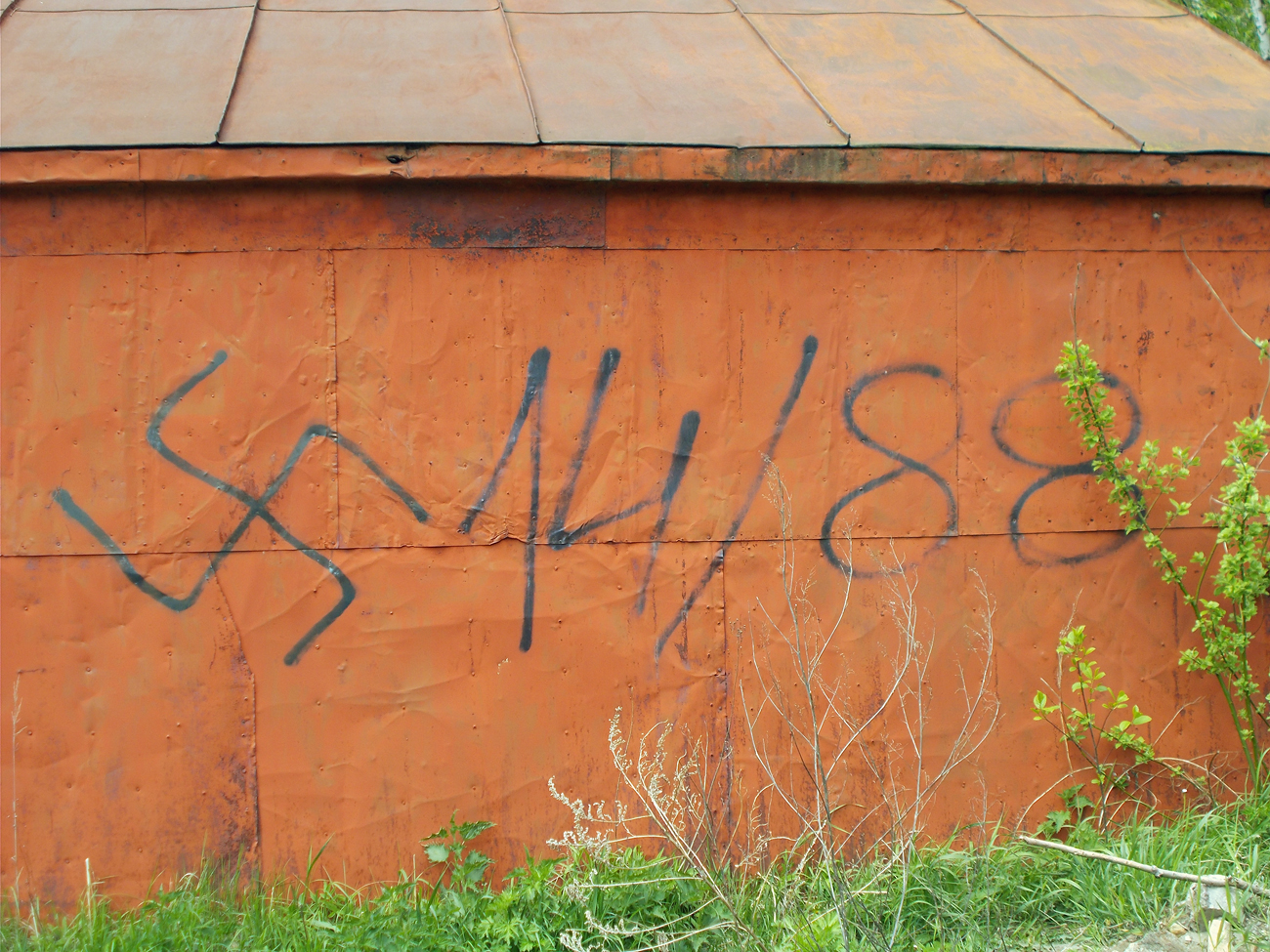
Graffiti with a swastika and 14/88 on a wall in Elektrostal, Moscow Oblast, Russia

"The Fourteen Words" (also abbreviated "14W" or "14"; also combined with "88" to form "14/88" or "1488") is a reference to two slogans originated by the American neo-Nazi David Eden Lane, one of nine founding members of the defunct white supremacist terrorist organization The Order, and are accompanied by Lane's "88 Precepts". The slogans have served as a rallying cry for militant white nationalists internationally.

The primary slogan in the Fourteen Words is:

We must secure the existence of our people and a future for white children,

A less commonly used variation is followed by:

because the beauty of the White Aryan woman must not perish from the earth.

The two slogans were coined after Lane was sentenced to 190 years in federal prison for planning and abetting the assassination of the Jewish talk show host Alan Berg, who was murdered by another member of the group in June 1984. They were popularized after Lane's imprisonment. The slogans were publicized through print company 14 Word Press, founded in St. Maries, Idaho, in 1995 by Lane's wife, Katja, to disseminate her husband's writings, along with Ron McVan who later moved his operation to Butte, Montana, after a falling-out with Katja.

Lane used the 14-88 numerical coding extensively throughout his spiritual, political, religious, esoteric, and philosophical tracts and notably in his "88 Precepts" manifesto. According to the Southern Poverty Law Center, inspiration for the Fourteen Words "are derived from a passage in Adolf Hitler's autobiographical book Mein Kampf". The Fourteen Words have been prominently used by neo-Nazis, white power skinheads and certain white nationalists and the alt-right. "88" is used by some as a shorthand for "Heil Hitler", 'H' being the 8th letter of the alphabet, though Lane viewed Nazism along with America as being part of the "Zionist conspiracy".

Lane's ideology was anti-American, white separatist, and insurrectionist; he considered loyalty to the United States to be "racial treason" and upheld the acronym "Our Race Is Our Nation" ("ORION"), viewing the United States as committing genocide against white people and as having been founded as a New World Order to finalize a global Zionist government.

Being bitterly opposed to the continued existence of the United States as a political entity, and labeling it the "murderer of the White race", Lane further advocated domestic terrorism as a tool to carve out a "white homeland" in the Northern Mountain States. To that end, Lane issued a declaration called "Moral Authority", published through now-defunct 14 Word Press and shared through the publications of Aryan Nations, World Church of the Creator, and other white separatist groups, in which he referred to the United States as a "Red, White and Blue traveling mass murder machine", while asserting that "true moral authority belongs to those who resist genocide".

== Phrasing ==
After Lane's publication of the Fourteen Words, they were adopted by white supremacists and neo-Nazis, white nationalists, identitarians, and members of the far-right and alt-right. The most widely used variation is "We must secure the existence of our people and a future for white children"; a less commonly used variation is "Because the beauty of the White Aryan woman must not perish from the earth". They are sometimes combined with the number 88 to form the abbreviations "14/88" or "1488". The 8s represent the eighth letter of the alphabet, H, with "HH" standing for Heil Hitler, according to Neo-Nazis who use the code. The number 88 was used by Lane as a reference to his "88 Precepts", along with a secondary reference to his "88 Lines and 14 Words". "88", when combined with "14", refers to numerology in Lane's white supremacist neo-pagan religion, Wotanism.

The slogan has been used in acts of white supremacist terrorism and violence. It was central to the symbolism of a 2008 Barack Obama assassination plot, which intended to kill 88 African Americans, including future president Barack Obama (at that time the Democratic Party nominee), 14 of whom were to be beheaded. Skinhead Curtis Allgier notably tattooed the words on to his body after he murdered corrections officer Stephen Anderson, and Dylann Roof's race war-inspired Charleston church shooting was influenced by the slogan, as were Robert Bowers' Pittsburgh synagogue shooting and Brenton Tarrant's Christchurch mosque shootings.

== Origins ==
Although there is a strong resemblance between the primary slogan and a statement in Adolf Hitler's Mein Kampf, neither Lane, nor Fourteen Word Press, noted any connection. Scholars including Barry Balleck have stated that Lane was almost certainly influenced by Hitler, specifically by the following statement in Mein Kampf.

What we must fight for is to safeguard the existence and reproduction of our race and our people, the sustenance of our children and the purity of our blood, the freedom and independence of the fatherland, so that our people may mature for the fulfillment of the mission allotted it by the creator of the universe. Every thought and every idea, every doctrine and all knowledge, must serve this purpose. And everything must be examined from this point of view and used or rejected according to its utility.

— Mein Kampf, Vol. I, Chapter 8

According to scholar Mattias Gardell, Lane decoded what Gardell termed the "Pyramid Prophecy", which included the concept that the King James Version of the Bible was encoded by Sir Francis Bacon and the concept that Lane was the "man of prophecy", described as the "666 Sun Man", incarnated to "warn and save the White Aryan Race from near extinction" – a view that was censored by Ron McVan and others who found the "messianic Antichrist" claims counterproductive.

Gardell's book Gods of the Blood states "The number 1776 appears in the numeric square of Mars in which is found the Star of David and its 741 formula, 741 also being the value of the 14 Words in simple English gematria." Lane claimed that both 14 word slogans came to him whilst he was asleep and that each contained 61 letters, 20 syllables and 74 characters, along with the 741 value.

== Advocates ==
=== United Kingdom ===
- Nick Griffin, a British politician, a former British National Party leader and a MEP, has stated that his political ideology can be summed up in the 14 Words. He has claimed "everything I do is related to building a nationalist movement through which [...] those 14 words can be carried out."
- Colin Jordan (1923–2009), a leading figure in post-war neo-Nazism in Great Britain and a longtime supporter of the 14 Words; contributed to Lane's book Deceived, Damned & Defiant.
- Millennial Woes, a Scottish alt-right, neoreactionary political activist and a YouTube personality, supports the slogan and in 2017, he stated that the "14 words used to be more controversial than they are nowadays." Faith Goldy has claimed that he had encouraged her to recite the slogan during an interview.
- The far-right, fascist, National Front political party supports the slogan.

=== United States ===
- Andrew Anglin, an American white supremacist and the founder of The Daily Stormer website, frequently uses, references, and supports the slogan, and has claimed, "We care not for our own egos or lives. We care only about the agenda, which is: We must secure the existence of our people and a future for white children."
- Baked Alaska, an American alt-right/far-right social media personality, supports the words but he does not support their creator, and he has stated that there's "nothing wrong" with the slogan. Distancing himself from its creator, he claimed, "Just because others have used them doesn't change the meaning." He has frequently promoted the slogan on social media including with monetary receipts, polls, questions and memes.
- Craig Cobb, an American white nationalist and separatist, created the video sharing website Podblanc and started a business which he named after the 14 Words, as well as tried to start a church named after Trump which later burned to the ground.
- Harold Covington (1953–2018), was an American white separatist leader and the founder of the Northwest Front organization, based on the 14 Words.
- Nathan Damigo, an American white supremacist, the leader of Identity Evropa and a former US Marine, supports and promotes the slogan with his organization.
- April Gaede, an American white nationalist and neo-Nazi stage mom, whose daughters (Prussian Blue) used to sing for Resistance Records; distributed David Lane's cremated remains in "14 pyramids" in order to symbolize the 14 Words.
- Matthew Heimbach, an American white supremacist and the founder of the Traditionalist Workers Party, has based a part of his party's platform on the "14 Words" and he has also affirmed them in various speeches, including a speech which he delivered to the Council of Conservative Citizens.
- William Daniel Johnson, an American white nationalist, attorney, and the chairman of the American Freedom Party, is an advocate of the 14 word slogan. He has stated that he and his organization "embrace principles that will secure the existence of our people and a future for our children". He has claimed that Ron Paul withdrew his endorsement of him for a judgeship in California, after media reported that he was an advocate of the 14 Words.
- Stephen McNallen, an American neo-pagan leader and the founder of the Asatru Folk Assembly, quoted the 14 Words verbatim and based his own slogan "The existence of my people is not negotiable" as a simplified 14 Words.
- Tom Metzger, an American white separatist leader and the founder of White Aryan Resistance, promoted the 14 Word writings of imprisoned David Lane; he accused the United States government of murdering Lane after Lane died in 2007.
- Jack Posobiec, an American alt-right conspiracy theorist and a former naval intelligence officer, has repeatedly published information which is related to "1488" and as a result, he has been described as a supporter of the slogan.
- Billy Roper, an American white supremacist who corresponded with David Lane and founded a White power group which he named "White Revolution" and based on the 14 Words.
- Vox Day, an American writer, video game designer, and alt-right activist, supports the 14 Words, promoting the slogan in his Sixteen points of the Alt-Right, which placed the sentence "we must secure the existence of white people and a future for white children" as the 14th point.
- weev, an American computer hacker and an Internet troll, has shown his support for the slogan, referencing "1488" in numerous computer transactions, as well as more explicitly discussing the topic on social media.

=== Other countries ===
- Faith Goldy, a Canadian far-right writer and commentator, has recited and supported the 14 Words, saying "I don't see that as controversial... We want to survive." After being banned by Patreon for her advocacy of the slogan, Goldy defended her views, and gathered petition signatures in public on a document which replaced "white children" with "aboriginal children", to supposedly prove the slogan was not hate speech.
- Marian Kotleba, a Slovak politician and leader of the far-right Kotleba – People's Party Our Slovakia political party, has been accused of demonstrating support for the slogan, with reference to the 14 Words by making a €1,488 donation to three families. The donations were used as an evidence in the court in which he was found guilty of supporting and propagating sympathies towards movements oppressing fundamental human rights and was sentenced to four years and four months in prison. The ruling is not valid yet and may be appealed.
- Mika Ranta, leader of the Soldiers of Odin, a Finnish far-right vigilante group, signs his communiques with the 14 Words.
- Vilhelm Junnila, far-right Finns Party Minister of Economic Affairs in the Orpo Cabinet, used the 14/88 as his campaign slogan, "Vote on the 14th, 88."

== References related to terrorism and violence ==
The slogans and the numerology of "14" and "88" have been used by many white supremacists, both before and after committing acts of violence (such as in manifestos), as well as in symbols which have been left at the scenes of criminal acts. These include Order-member David Lane, assassination attempters Paul Schlesselman and Daniel Cowart, and murderers Dylann Roof and Curtis Allgier. Allgier has "14" and "88" tattooed on his forehead above and to the sides of the words "skin" and "head" above his eyes in his mugshot.

=== Barack Obama assassination plot ===
"14/88" numerology was symbolically included in the Barack Obama assassination plot in October 2008. Both Neo-Nazis, Schlesselman and Cowart were introduced to each other online by a mutual friend who shared their white supremacist beliefs. Within a month of meeting, they had planned to kill the Democratic Party nominee by driving at their target and shooting from their vehicle. This was to be followed by a killing spree in which the men planned to kill 88 African Americans, 14 of whom were to be beheaded. They were targeting mostly children at an unidentified, predominantly black school. Shortly after their arrest, their vehicle was discovered to have "14" and "88" written onto it.

=== Wisconsin Sikh temple shooting ===
Mass-shooter Wade Michael Page, who killed six and wounded four members of the Sikh community in August 2012, had been a supporter of the Fourteen Words, and was found with "14" onto a Celtic Cross tattooed on his arm, after committing suicide at the scene of the crime. About a year before the shooting, Page wrote on the Internet regarding the slogan, "Passive submission is indirect support to the oppressors. Stand up for yourself and live the 14 words."

=== Charleston church shooting ===
After the Charleston mass-murder shooting in June 2015, Dylann Roof's ideology and apparent manifesto emerged in the media with multiple references to "1488"; these included several photos of Roof pictured alongside the numbers. He symbolically brought 88 bullets to the Emanuel African Methodist Episcopal Church to carry out the shooting, in which nine African Americans were killed.

=== Pittsburgh synagogue shooting ===
Robert Bowers, the gunman suspected of killing 11 people and wounding 6 at the Tree of Life Synagogue in Pittsburgh, Pennsylvania, included the numeric code "1488" in the header image of his Gab social media account. Bowers also expressed Christian Identity rhetoric declaring "the lord jesus christ is come in the flesh" while espousing anti-Semitic views that "jews are children of satan".

=== Christchurch mosque shootings ===
Brenton Harrison Tarrant, the Australian shooter responsible for the attacks on two mosques in New Zealand, posted images on Twitter of firearms and published his manifesto "The Great Replacement" which both had the neo-Nazi symbol Black Sun and the slogan (as "14" or "14 Words") written on the weapons and also in the manifesto.

=== Kankaanpää and Lahti terror plots ===
Finnish Atomwaffen members plotted assassinating Prime Minister Sanna Marin, derailing trains and killing members of ethnic minorities, and multiple men from Kankaanpää and Lahti were convicted of terrorism offenses and for possessing illegal weapons and explosives. One man is also suspected of a string of letter bombs sent to Social Democrat, Green and Left party offices. Finnish AWD members ended communiques with "14/88".

== See also ==
- Antisemitic trope
- Fort Smith sedition trial
- Great Replacement
- Kalergi Plan
- List of conspiracy theories § Antisemitism
- List of symbols designated by the Anti-Defamation League as hate symbols
- Nazi symbolism
- Northwest Territorial Imperative
- RaHoWa
- White ethnostate
- White genocide conspiracy theory
- White Lives Matter
- Zionist Occupation Government conspiracy theory
