= Star City Bridge =

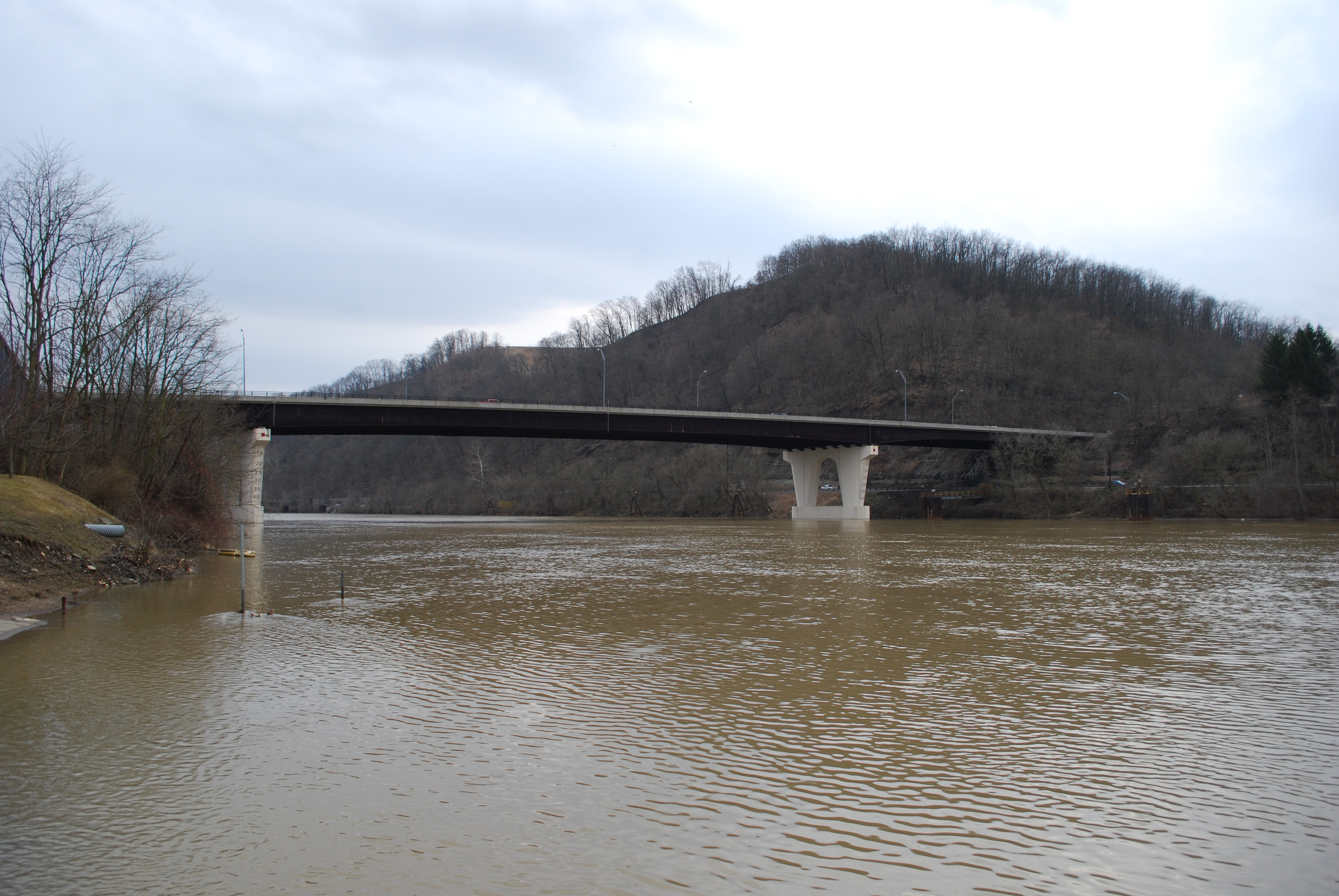
- Viewing the Star City Bridge from downstream in March 2008.
- Coordinates: 39°39′28″N 79°59′32″W
- Carries: US 19 / WV 7; 5 lanes (4 through plus 1 turn)
- Crosses: Monongahela River
- Locale: Star City, West Virginia
- Official name: Edith B. Barill Bridge
- Maintained by: West Virginia Division of Highways
- ID number: 00000000031A286

Characteristics
- Design: Steel Girder Bridge
- Total length: 1,013 feet (308.8 m)
- Width: 80 feet (24.4 m)
- Longest span: 412 feet (126 m)
- Clearance below: 60 feet (18.3 m) over Monongahela River

History
- Opened: 2002

Statistics
- Daily traffic: 29,700 (2005)

Location
- Interactive map of Star City Bridge

The Edith B. Barill Bridge, more commonly known as the Star City Bridge, was completed in 2004 and connects Star City, West Virginia with Interstate 79 and western Monongalia County. The bridge serves as a primary means of access to the north side of Morgantown.

The former Star City Bridge was built in 1950. In 2002, that bridge was demolished and replaced by the current five-lane bridge that was completed in 2004. It has since been dedicated the Edith Barill Bridge after a long-time Star City mayor but is still generally known as the Star City Bridge.

The new Star City Bridge is equipped with over 700 sensors that measure the weight, speed, and number of vehicles that cross it. This data will be studied at West Virginia University, and used to study the effect of everyday traffic on the bridge, but especially large, commercial trucks. The sensors will also measure how the bridge expands and contracts in the different temperatures of each season. The data will be used for the West Virginia Division of Highways to find and correct weak points in the bridge.

== See also ==
- List of crossings of the Monongahela River
