= Charlene Marshall =

American politician (born 1933)

Member of the West Virginia House of Delegates
- In office December 1, 2004 – December 1, 2014
- Preceded by: Barbara Fleischauer
- Succeeded by: Brian Kurcaba; Joe Statler
- Constituency: 44th district (2004–2012); 51st district (2012–2014)
- In office December 1, 1998 – December 1, 2002
- Preceded by: Bob Beach; Mike Buchanan; Eugene Claypole
- Succeeded by: Cindy Frich; Nancy Houston
- Constituency: 44th district

Mayor of Morgantown, West Virginia
- In office July 2, 1991 – July 7, 1998
- Deputy: George Nedeff; Ronald Justice; Frank Scafella; Tom Bloom
- Preceded by: Kenneth V. Randolph
- Succeeded by: Frank Scafella

Personal details
- Born: September 17, 1933 (age 92) Osage, West Virginia, U.S.
- Party: Democratic
- Spouse: Rogers
- Occupation: data technician

Charlene J. Marshall (born September 17, 1933) is an American politician who was a Democratic member of the West Virginia House of Delegates, representing the 44th District from 2004 until 2014 and served as House Chaplain since 2004 as well. She earlier served as a Delegate from 1998 through 2002, and was the Mayor of Morgantown, West Virginia from 1991 until 1998.
