= William Daniel Johnson =

American white nationalist

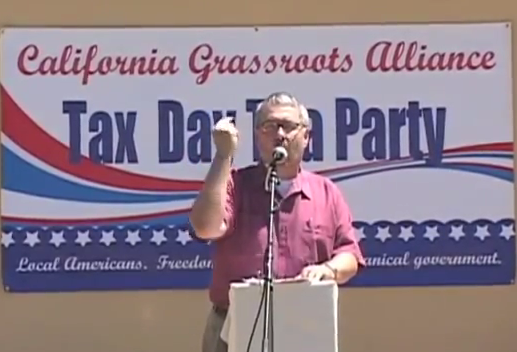
Tea Party movement rally

William Daniel Johnson (born 1954) is an American white nationalist, attorney, and the chairman of the American Freedom Party.

== Background ==
Johnson graduated from Brigham Young University where he majored in Japanese and later served as a Mormon missionary in Japan.

Before becoming an activist, Johnson's background was as an attorney. He was admitted to the bar in California in 1981, Colorado in 1990, and Arizona in 2006.

In the 1980s, Johnson began to use three separate identities to promote his work. Under the name James O. Pace, he wrote a 1985 book advocating a constitutional amendment (the "Pace Amendment") that would repeal the 14th and 15th amendments and deport almost all non-whites from the United States. This proposal was similar to one advocated earlier by J. B. Stoner. The Pace Amendment proposed defining whiteness thus:

No person shall be a citizen of the United States unless he is a non-Hispanic white of the European race, in whom there is no ascertainable trace of Negro blood, nor more than one-eighth Mongolian, Asian, Asia Minor, Middle Eastern, Semitic, Near Eastern, American Indian, Malay or other non-European or non-white blood, provided that Hispanic whites, defined as anyone with an Hispanic ancestor, may be citizens if, in addition to meeting the aforesaid ascertainable trace and percentage tests, they are in appearance indistinguishable from Americans whose ancestral home is in the British Isles or Northwestern Europe. Only citizens shall have the right and privilege to reside permanently in the United States.

— William Daniel Johnson (as "James O. Pace"), Amendment to the Constitution

Under the Pace amendment, indigenous Americans and Hawaiians would be maintained in tribal reservations instead of being deported. The Pace book included dust-cover comments written by Richard Girnt Butler and Dan Gayman. In 1986, he promoted the book by attending Butler's Aryan Nations World Congress.

Under the name "Daniel Johnson", Johnson founded the League of Pace Amendment Advocates, a group dedicated to promoting the Pace amendment. In his capacity as an attorney, Johnson used the name "William D. Johnson". In 1987, following an exposé by the Los Angeles Times, it quickly became clear that "Pace" and both Johnsons were all the same person. This came to light partly because the League had been infiltrated by a member of the Simon Wiesenthal Center, which opposed the amendment.

== Political aspirations ==
In 1989, Johnson ran for Congress as an independent in a Wyoming special election to replace Dick Cheney. He received enough signatures to appear on the ballot, and said he was running because "Whites don't have a future here in this country, and that is ... one of many issues that I am addressing." His campaign was promoted by the Nationalist Movement, and he ended up receiving about 0.3% of the vote.

In 2006, Johnson again ran for Congress, this time in a Democratic primary for an Arizona House seat. He did not openly espouse the Pace Amendment, but did call for the deportation of Mexican illegal aliens. His campaign manager, Russ Dove, had attracted coverage earlier for burning a Mexican flag. In this contest, Johnson came in a distant fifth. During this campaign, Johnson stated that he opposed a constitutional amendment banning same-sex marriage.

In 2008, Johnson ran for a seat on the Superior Court of California, County of Los Angeles. He was initially endorsed in that race by Ron Paul, but after Johnson's racist views came to light, Paul retracted his endorsement of Johnson. Bruce Einhorn, the national commissioner of the Anti-Defamation League, commented on the election by saying "A competent judge is one who parks his politics at the courthouse steps. Someone who holds such racist views and flaunts them so obviously is in no position to block them out of his courtroom." Johnson lost this election, winning 26% of the vote.

In 2010, Johnson became the first (and so far only) chairman of the American Freedom Party. During an appearance on The Political Cesspool, Johnson said "Our positions are reasonable and moral and everybody can understand them and accept them" and said that he wanted to run candidates who were "sincere, honest people".

In 2012, Johnson ran for Congress under the Natural Law Party label for the 11th District in Michigan. He received 3,251 votes, or 0.9%.

In 2016, Donald Trump's presidential campaign named Johnson as one of its delegates to the 2016 Republican National Convention, to be held in July. Trump campaign officials blamed Johnson's inclusion on a "database error", though Johnson claimed he really was one of Trump's delegates.

== Views ==
Johnson has expressed support for Israel, arguing that it should adopt the Pace Amendment model. "In 20 years ... Israel will cease to exist unless Israel deports all non-Jews from its borders [and] establishes a demilitarized zone around the country; America and Europe repatriate their anti-Israel Arab/Muslim populations; and Israel renews its efforts to call Jews home. Israel's policy should be to encourage all Jews in America ... who desire the continued existence of Israel to emigrate there."

In 2016, Johnson paid $2,000 for a robocall to Utah voters accusing Evan McMullin of homosexuality. As part of a later apology for this action, he explained that "Evan McMullin typified that perfidious mentality" in Americans of "failure to marry and have children," adding that the "white birth rate is so astonishingly low that Western Civilization will soon cease to exist."

Johnson is an advocate of the Fourteen Words slogan. He has stated that he and his organization "embrace principles that will secure the existence of our people and a future for our children". He has claimed that Ron Paul withdrew his endorsement of him for a judgeship in California, after media reported that he was an advocate of the 14 Words.
