= Murder of Stephen Anderson =

American murderer and white supremacist (born 1979)

Curtis Allgier
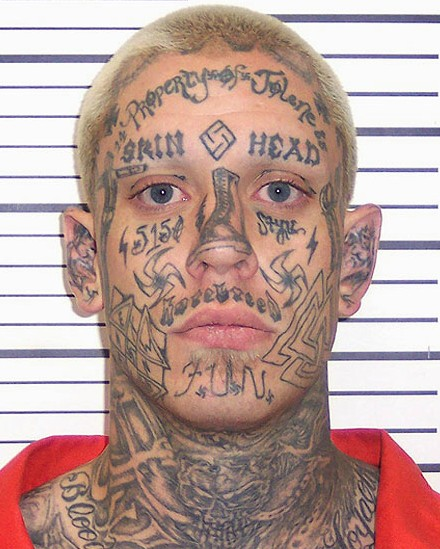
- Mug shot of Allgier
- Born: August 25, 1979 (age 47); South Dakota, U.S.
- Other name: "Wood"
- Status: Incarcerated
- Conviction: Aggravated murder
- Penalty: Life imprisonment

Curtis Michael Allgier (born August 25, 1979) is an American white supremacist who is being held in the Utah State Correctional Facility in Salt Lake City, Utah, for the murder of corrections officer Stephen Anderson.

== Prior arrests and convictions ==
Allgier's criminal history began in 1998 with convictions for theft and reckless driving in South Dakota. He was charged with felony burglary, forgery and theft in Utah during October 2000, after he burglarized a neighbor's apartment and made out a stolen check to himself for $300. That month, he was also charged in another county with carrying a concealed handgun and sentenced to 180 days and probation.

Allgier fled Utah in August 2001, which led to a one-to-15-year sentence. Paroled in May 2003, he was then arrested and sent back to prison in July 2004 for traveling to California without authorization, and possessing two knives. He was paroled in October 2006. In November, he became a fugitive for two days on a parole violation. Allgier, armed, barricaded himself inside a hotel room but was captured by a Salt Lake City SWAT team after falling through the ceiling where he had tried to hide. On June 14, 2007, he was sentenced to 104 months in prison for being a convicted felon in possession of a firearm.

== Murder of Stephen Anderson ==
On the morning of June 25, 2007, corrections officer Stephen Anderson escorted Allgier to the University of Utah, where Allgier was scheduled for an MRI, because he had been complaining of back problems. While waiting with Anderson in an examination room at the university's orthopedic center, Allgier was unshackled. He then overpowered and disarmed Anderson and shot him once in the chest and once in the head. Allgier later stated that the gun went off accidentally during the struggle. After fleeing the clinic on foot, Allgier carjacked a Ford Explorer, and led police on a high-speed chase. Allgier was captured at an Arby's restaurant a few miles away, where he tried to shoot an employee but the gun malfunctioned. Eric Fullerton, a Vietnam veteran and former Army paratrooper, confronted him and managed to take his gun away. Allgier fled to the back of the restaurant, where police found him hiding in the manager's office.

=== Trial ===
Allgier's murder trial was initially set for June 2012. In March 2012, the judge granted a motion postponing the trial. On October 3, 2012, Allgier unexpectedly pleaded guilty to murder and several other charges, and also pleaded no contest to three charges of attempted murder. He was sentenced to life in prison without the possibility of parole.

In January 2015, Allgier lost his right to legal representation after repeatedly making frivolous objections to, and threats against, his court-appointed attorneys during his appeals of the life sentence.

In November 2017, the Utah Supreme Court rejected Allgier's self-represented motions to withdraw his guilty pleas. The court ruled that Allgier knew conditions of his guilty pleas and was unable to withdraw them due to missing a deadline, and furthermore that Allgier had failed to establish that his lawyers did not adequately represent him.

== Tattoos ==
Allgier has numerous tattoos, many of which express his white supremacist beliefs. He has multiple swastikas, including ones tattooed on either side of his nose, earlobes, chin, center brow, and front of his ears.

Other tattoos include:

- 14 88 (temples): Refers to the Fourteen Words written by David Lane (white nationalist writer) "We must secure the existence of our people and a future for White Children." and Heil Hitler, represented by the 88 ('H' being the eighth letter of the English alphabet). This is usually written as "14 88", "14/88" or "1488".
- Crucified skinhead (right cheek): Symbolizes the supposed persecution of working class skinheads by the upper class.
- Three intersecting triangles (left jaw): Known as a valknut or volknut, symbolizes the afterlife and binding of the soul to Odin, who is considered chief among the Norse gods, among non-racist Pagans. However, among racist Pagans, it signifies "that one is ready to be taken into the ranks of Odin's chosen warriors."
- 5150 (under the right eye): A likely reference to California statute 5150, which requires commitment to psychiatric hospitals for people declared to be a danger to themselves or others.
- Hatebreed (upper lip): An American hardcore/metalcore band.
- Iron Crosses (forehead temples): Military decoration used by Nazi Germany. Originally from a symbol, typically in black with a white or silver outline that originated after 1219 when the Kingdom of Jerusalem granted the Teutonic Order the right to combine the Teutonic Black Cross placed above a silver Cross of Jerusalem.
- SS Lightning Bolts (jawbones): A symbol of the Schutzstaffel (translated to Protection Squadron or defence corps), abbreviated as SS or with stylized "Armanen" sig runes). The Schutzstaffel was a major paramilitary organization under Adolf Hitler, and was a Nazi police force that administered death camps, in addition to staffing mobile killing units known as Einsatzgruppen. The Nuremberg judges declared the entire SS a criminal organization after World War II.
- Property of Jolene: Refers to his wife Jolene; the couple are now divorced.
- F.U.N.: stands for "fuck you, nigger"
- Blood, Honor, and Loyalty (collarbone): A heavily used phrase by white supremacists as well as other neo-Nazis in clothing, lyrics, and tattoos.
