= McDowell, West Virginia =

McDowell
- Unincorporated community
- Location within West Virginia McDowell (the United States)
- Coordinates: 37°24′10″N 81°22′49″W
- Country: United States
- State: West Virginia
- County: McDowell
- Elevation: 1,965 ft (599 m)
- Time zone: UTC-5 (Eastern (EST))
  - Summer (DST): UTC-4 (EDT)
- Area codes: 304 & 681
- GNIS feature ID: 1555083

McDowell is an unincorporated community in McDowell County, West Virginia, United States. McDowell is 3.5 miles (5.6 km) east-southeast of Northfork.

The community most likely was named after the local McDowell Coal and Coke Company.
