= 2018 West Virginia elections =

- November 6, 2018
- Registered: 597,149
- Turnout: 47.93%

West Virginia held elections on November 6, 2018. Elections for the United States House and Senate were held as well as two high-profile ballot measures. These elections were held concurrently with other elections nationwide. Primary elections were held on May 8, 2018.

== Federal offices ==
=== House of Representatives ===
In District 1, Republican incumbent David McKinley won reelection with 64.6% of the vote, defeating Democratic challenger Kendra Fershee, a West Virginia University law professor.

In District 2, Republican incumbent Alex Mooney won reelection with 53.9% of the vote, defeating Talley Sergent, a former U.S. State Department official.

In District 3, Republican incumbent Evan Jenkins resigned in September 2018. Democratic state Senator Richard Ojeda challenged Republican Majority Whip of the West Virginia House of Delegates Carol Miller. Miller won with 56.4% of the vote.

=== Senate ===
Incumbent Democrat Joe Manchin was ranked by many outlets to be one of the most vulnerable incumbents up for election. His challenger was Attorney General of West Virginia Patrick Morrisey, who won a contentious Republican primary. Manchin won the election with 49.6% of the vote against Morrisey's 46.3% vote share. This was much lower than Manchin's previous performance of a vote share 60.6% in 2012.

== State Legislature ==
=== State Senate ===
17 of the 34 State Senate seats were up for election in 2018. Democrats won a net gain of two seats, but Republicans maintained their majority with 20 seats to the Democrats' 14. A total of five Republican incumbents lost their election, three in their primaries and two in the general election.

=== House of Delegates ===
All 100 seats in the West Virginia House of Delegates were up for election. The Republican majority sustained a net loss of four seats, decreasing the majority from 63 to 59. A total of five Democrats, seven Republicans, and one Independent incumbents lost reelection in either their primaries or in the general election.

== Ballot measures ==
=== Amendment 1 ===
Amendment 1
- No Constitutional right to abortion Amendment

Results
Choice	Votes	%
Yes	295,536	51.73%
No	275,738	48.27%
Valid votes	571,274	100.00%
Invalid or blank votes	0	0.00%
Total votes	571,274	100.00%
County results
Yes
60–70%
50–60%
No
60–70%
50–60%

"No Constitutional right to abortion Amendment"

To amend the West Virginia Constitution to clarify that nothing in the Constitution of West Virginia secures or protects a right to abortion or requires the funding of abortion.

Amendment 1
Choice	Votes	%
For	295,536	51.73
Against	275,738	48.27
Total	571,274	100.00

=== Amendment 2 ===
Amendment 2 results by county Yes: 80–90%; 70–80%; 60–70%; 50–60%

Amended the state constitution to authorize the legislature to reduce the budget of the state judiciary by up to 15 percent, among other things relating to the judiciary.

Amendment 2
Choice	Votes	%
For	386,272	72.35
Against	147,594	27.65
Total	533,866	100.00

== Supreme Court of Appeals ==
Two special elections were held after the resignation of Justices Menis Ketchum and Robin Davis in July and August respectively. The resignations came after revelations and legislative investigations into a misuse of state funds and corruption of the state judiciary. Tim Armstead was appointed to Ketchum's seat and Evan Jenkins was appointed to Davis's seat by Governor Jim Justice.

=== Division 1 ===
==== Candidates ====
- Tim Armstead, incumbent justice of the West Virginia Supreme Court of Appeals, Speaker of the West Virginia House of Delegates, 2015–2018
- Chris Wilkes
- Ronald Hatfield Jr.
- Mark Hunt, member of the West Virginia House of Delegates from District 36
- Joanna I. Tabit, judge on the Thirteenth Circuit Court in West Virginia

Division 1 results by county Armstead: 20–30%; 30–40%; 40–50%; Tabit: 20–30%; 30–40%; Wilkes: 20–30%; 30–40%; 40–50%; 60–70%; 70–80%; Hunt: 20–30%; Hatfield: 20–30%; 30–40%; Carlton: 50–60%

General election results
Party	Candidate	Votes	%
Nonpartisan	Tim Armstead	131,296	26.1
Nonpartisan	Joanna I. Tabit	111,915	22.2
Nonpartisan	Chris Wilkes	66,037	13.1
Nonpartisan	Mark Hunt	60,705	12.0
Nonpartisan	Ronald Hatfield Jr.	39,155	7.8
Nonpartisan	Others	94,832	18.8
Total votes		503,940	100.0%

=== Division 2 ===
==== Candidates ====
- Jim Douglas, judge on the West Virginia Family Court Circuit 11, Division 5
- Robert Frank
- Evan Jenkins, incumbent justice of the West Virginia Supreme Court of Appeals, U.S. representative from WV, 2015–2018
- Jeffrey Kessler, former West Virginia State Senate president
- Dennise Renee Smith, assistant attorney general of West Virginia

Division 2 results by county Jenkins: 20–30%; 30–40%; 40–50%; 50–60%; 60–70%; 70–80%; Smith: 10–20%; 30–40%; Kessler: 40–50%; 50–60%; 60–70%; Douglas: 30–40%; Frank: 40–50%; Thompson: 50–60%; O'Brien: 20–30%; 30–40%

General election results
Party	Candidate	Votes	%
Nonpartisan	Evan Jenkins	182,133	36.0
Nonpartisan	Dennise Renee Smith	70,394	13.9
Nonpartisan	Jeffrey Kessler	60,077	11.9
Nonpartisan	Jim Douglas	47,609	9.4
Nonpartisan	Robert Frank	29,751	5.9
Nonpartisan	Others	115,752	22.9
Total votes		505,716	100.0%
