= Core, West Virginia =

Unincorporated community in West Virginia, United States

- Unincorporated community
- Location within West Virginia Location within the United States
- Coordinates: 39°40′48″N 80°06′26″W
- Country: United States
- State: West Virginia
- County: Monongalia
- Elevation: 984 ft (300 m)
- Time zone: UTC-5 (Eastern (EST))
  - Summer (DST): UTC-4 (EDT)
- Area codes: 304 & 681
- GNIS feature ID: 1537682

Core is an unincorporated community in Monongalia County, West Virginia, United States. Core is 9 miles (14 km) northwest of downtown Morgantown.

The community was named after the local Core family.
