= Anthony Barill =

American politician (1933–2024)

Member of the West Virginia House of Delegates from the 51st district
- In office 2010–2014

Personal details
- Born: Anthony Peter Barill; November 20, 1933 Star City, West Virginia, U.S.
- Died: September 27, 2024 (aged 90)
- Party: Democratic
- Occupation: Politician

Anthony Peter Barill (November 20, 1933 – September 27, 2024) was an American politician from the state of West Virginia. A member of the Democratic Party, Barill was a member of the West Virginia House of Delegates from 2010 to 2014, representing the 51st district.

Barill was born and raised in Star City, West Virginia. He served as the Magistrate of Monongalia County, West Virginia, from 1980 through 1997. From 1997 through 2001, Barill was the County Sheriff. He was first elected to the West Virginia House of Delegates in 2010.

In January 2014, Barill was struck by a bullet in his ankle when his son, Brad, committed suicide by firearm.

Barill died in September 2024, his cause of death not reported.
