= Star City, West Virginia =

- Town
- Seal

- Location of Star City in Monongalia County, West Virginia.
- Coordinates: 39°39′29″N 79°59′10″W
- Country: United States
- State: West Virginia
- County: Monongalia
- Incorporated: May 17, 1907

Area
  - Total: 0.59 sq mi (1.53 km^{2})
  - Land: 0.49 sq mi (1.27 km^{2})
  - Water: 0.10 sq mi (0.26 km^{2})
- Elevation: 955 ft (291 m)

Population (2020)
  - Total: 1,779
  - Estimate (2021): 1,789
  - Density: 3,985/sq mi (1,538.8/km^{2})
- Time zone: UTC−5 (Eastern (EST))
  - Summer (DST): UTC−4 (EDT)
- ZIP Codes: 26504–26505
- Area codes: 304/681
- FIPS code: 54-76516
- GNIS feature ID: 1555703
- Website: www.starcitywv.com

Star City is a town in Monongalia County, West Virginia, United States. The population was 1,779 at the 2020 census. It is included in the Morgantown metropolitan area.

== History ==
Star City was founded in 1907, and took its name from the local Star Glass Company.

=== Socialist Party government ===
By 1910 the Socialist Party of America had organized a branch in the town and within a year had won four out of five seats in the city council, as part of a wider national political movement of the time.

The Socialist Party would continue to be the dominant party in Star City politics through 1917, when its rival the Citizens' Party took over municipal government. To avoid un-American connotations that became associated with the name after World War I, the Socialist Party of Star City in 1918 renamed itself the Independent Citizens' party and won back local government, partly due to its opposition to the regressive "capitation tax" the Citizens' Party had imposed. However, in 1924, the People's party, formed two years earlier and composed largely of former Citizens' party supporters, took over. Until that time, the Socialists were a mainstay of this working-class town, organizing the Workingmen's Co-operative Store and creating community pillars with Local Twenty-six of the American Flint Glass Workers' Union and the Young People's Socialist League.

=== Star City Volunteer Fire Department ===
The Star City Volunteer Fire Department was founded in 1939. The department has an all-volunteer firefighting staff and a combination of paid and volunteer EMS staff. The agency responds to approximately 1,200 emergency calls per year and provides Firefighting and Rescue services to the town of Star City and surrounding unincorporated areas. It is designated as the district's Company 20 (Fire) and Station 20 (EMS).

== Geography ==
Star City is located at 39°39′29″N 79°59′10″W (39.657966, -79.986046).

According to the United States Census Bureau, the town has a total area of 0.59 square miles (1.53 km^{2}), of which 0.49 square miles (1.27 km^{2}) is land and 0.10 square miles (0.26 km^{2}) is water.

== Demographics ==
Historical population
Census	Pop.	Note	%±
1910	318		—
1920	823		158.8%
1930	1,121		36.2%
1940	1,175		4.8%
1950	1,205		2.6%
1960	1,236		2.6%
1970	1,312		6.1%
1980	1,464		11.6%
1990	1,251		−14.5%
2000	1,366		9.2%
2010	1,825		33.6%
2020	1,779		−2.5%
2021 (est.)	1,817	▲	2.1%
U.S. Decennial Census

=== 2010 census ===
As of the census of 2010, there were 1,825 people, 903 households, and 363 families living in the town. The population density was 3,724.5 inhabitants per square mile (1,438.0/km^{2}). There were 1,001 housing units at an average density of 2,042.9 per square mile (788.8/km^{2}). The racial makeup of the town was 88.7% White, 4.4% African American, 4.1% Asian, 0.5% from other races, and 2.4% from two or more races. Hispanic or Latino of any race were 2.9% of the population.

There were 903 households, of which 14.4% had children under the age of 18 living with them, 27.0% were married couples living together, 9.3% had a female householder with no husband present, 3.9% had a male householder with no wife present, and 59.8% were non-families. 39.5% of all households were made up of individuals, and 8.1% had someone living alone who was 65 years of age or older. The average household size was 2.02 and the average family size was 2.69.

The median age in the town was 29.9 years. 11.4% of residents were under the age of 18; 27.4% were between the ages of 18 and 24; 28.4% were from 25 to 44; 21.8% were from 45 to 64; and 11.1% were 65 years of age or older. The gender makeup of the town was 50.7% male and 49.3% female.

=== 2000 census ===
As of the census of 2000, there were 1,366 people, 697 households, and 333 families living in the town. The population density was 2,785.4 inhabitants per square mile (1,075.4 inhabitants/km^{2}). There were 753 housing units at an average density of 1,535.4 per square mile (592.8/km^{2}). The racial makeup of the town was 93.56% White, 2.64% African American, 2.34% Asian, 0.07% Pacific Islander, 0.37% from other races, and 1.02% from two or more races. Hispanic or Latino of any race were 0.15% of the population.

There were 697 households, out of which 17.4% had children under the age of 18 living with them, 35.6% were married couples living together, 8.0% had a female householder with no husband present, and 52.1% were non-families. 41.3% of all households were made up of individuals, and 12.6% had someone living alone who was 65 years of age or older. The average household size was 1.96 and the average family size was 2.71.

In the town, the population was spread out, with 15.0% under the age of 18, 17.1% from 18 to 24, 28.5% from 25 to 44, 20.9% from 45 to 64, and 18.5% who were 65 years of age or older. The median age was 36 years. For every 100 females, there were 92.7 males. For every 100 females age 18 and over, there were 90.6 males.

The median income for a household in the town was $26,771, and the median income for a family was $37,500. Males had a median income of $27,188 versus $21,838 for females. The per capita income for the town was $17,003. About 12.1% of families and 15.7% of the population were below the poverty line, including 11.2% of those under age 18 and 5.9% of those age 65 or over.

== Education ==
It is served by Monongalia County Schools. Zoned schools are Suncrest Elementary School, Suncrest Middle School, and Morgantown High School.

== See also ==
- Murder of Skylar Neese
- Star City Bridge
