= Mike Oliverio =

American politician

Member of the West Virginia Senate from the 13th district
- Incumbent
- Assumed office December 1, 2022 Serving with Joey Garcia
- Preceded by: Bob Beach
- In office December 1, 1994 – December 1, 2010
- Preceded by: Joseph M. Minard
- Succeeded by: Bob Beach

Member of the West Virginia House of Delegates from the 44th district
- In office December 1, 1992 – December 1, 1994
- Preceded by: District created
- Succeeded by: Eric Blass; Barbara Fleischauer

Personal details
- Born: August 6, 1963 (age 63) Fairmont, West Virginia
- Party: Republican (2018–present)
- Other political affiliations: Democratic (before 2018)
- Spouse: Melissa Kirk
- Education: West Virginia University
- Occupation: Financial planner

Michael Angelo Oliverio II (born August 6, 1963) is a State Senator for the 13th district and the 2010 Democratic nominee for U.S. Representative for West Virginia's 1st congressional district. He previously served in the West Virginia House of Delegates.

Oliverio ran for his former State Senate district as a Republican in 2018, but lost to incumbent Bob Beach. In 2022, Oliverio ran again in the open 13th district after Beach retired, defeating delegate Barbara Fleischauer.

== Early life, education and career ==
Oliverio was born August 6, 1963, in Fairmont, West Virginia. He served in the United States Army, where he achieved the rank of Captain.

Oliverio is currently employed as a financial planner for Northwestern Mutual.

== West Virginia Legislature ==
Oliverio was first elected to public office representing the 44th House District (portions of Monongalia County) in 1992. In 1994, he was elected to the 13th Senatorial District of West Virginia. Reelected in 1998, 2002, and 2006, Oliverio served as the chairman of the Labor Committee and vice-chairman of the Judiciary Committee. One of Oliverio's legislative accomplishments was a change to the state constitution which allows West Virginia's state government to invest in stocks rather than just fixed-income securities as before. Oliverio did not seek reelection in 2010 due to his candidacy for Congress. His term ended in January 2011.

== Political positions ==
Oliverio is considered to be a conservative and has espoused issues such as reducing the national debt. He advocates government bans on abortion. In 2010 the anti-abortion group Susan B. Anthony List said "it spent $78,000 on the 1st District race and made 80,000 prerecorded calls on Oliverio's behalf Monday and Tuesday. The results, it said, should serve as a warning to other incumbents."

Along with Delegate Jonathan Miller, a Republican, he served as the state co-chair of the American Legislative Exchange Council (ALEC). Oliverio was also thanked in a 2006 speech by President George W. Bush for his assistance in securing the confirmation of Samuel Alito to the United States Supreme Court.

On March 20, 2010, West Virginia Republican Party chair Doug McKinney referred to Oliverio's conservative political leanings by saying, "Sen. Oliverio has always been a conservative guy. He votes with the Republicans on committees. We've joked for years he needs to come over to the party who thinks like he does."

== 2010 U.S. Congressional campaign ==
On February 1, 2010, Oliverio announced his candidacy for West Virginia's 1st congressional district seat. He defeated 14-term incumbent Alan Mollohan in the Democratic primary on May 11, 2010. Oliverio lost to David McKinley by an extremely narrow margin. He indicated that his concerns about the national debt served as the primary impetus for his campaign. Oliverio announced his interest in entering the 2012 congressional race for a re-match with McKinley, but ultimately decided not to run.

== Personal life ==
Oliverio resides in Morgantown, West Virginia, with his wife and two children. His father, Michael Angelo Oliverio (Mike Oliverio, Sr.) was a former Monongalia County clerk.
