= Rodney Pyles =

American politician (1945–2026)

Member of the West Virginia House of Delegates from the 51st district
- In office December 1, 2016 – December 2020
- Preceded by: Brian Kurcaba
- Succeeded by: Joe Statler

Personal details
- Born: Rodney Allen Pyles; June 21, 1945
- Died: April 7, 2026 (aged 80)
- Party: Democratic
- Spouse: Carol Louise Wrobleski (m. 1972)
- Children: 1
- Education: West Virginia University (BA, master's)

Rodney Allen Pyles (June 21, 1945 – April 7, 2026) was an American politician who served in the West Virginia House of Delegates from the 51st district from 2016 to 2020.

== Early life ==
Rodney Allen Pyles was born on June 21, 1945, as the fourth child of Lucy (née Scarcella) and Melford J. Pyles. He was raised at Wiles Hill in Morgantown, West Virginia. He graduated from Morgantown High School in 1963. He graduated with a Bachelor of Arts in politicial science from West Virginia University (WVU). He attended the university on a Benedum Scholarship and graduated from WVU with a master's degree in political science in 1967. At the university, he worked as a research assistant and student librarian. He was a member of Pi Sigma Alpha, Phi Alpha Theta, Young Democrats, Astronomy Club, and the university's orchestra.

== Career ==
In August 1969, Pyles joined Alderson Broaddus University as a sociology professor. From 1971 to 1977, he was assistant curator at WVU's library. In 1977, he was appointed as state archivist by Governor Jay Rockefeller. He then returned to Morgantown and served as the assessor of Monongalia County for over 20 years.

Pyles was a Democrat. He served in the West Virginia House of Delegates, representing the 51st district, from 2016 to 2020. He sponsored a bill to ban the declawing of cats. In 2018, Pyles and the Democrats swept all five seats in the 51st district, the largest multi-member district in the House. As a result, the Monongalia County delegates, all Democrats, called themselves “The Fab Five” and frequently voted and worked together on bills. In 2020, he was defeated for re-election by former Republican Delegate Joe Statler, breaking the all-Democratic delegation.

== Personal life ==
Pyles married Carol Louise Wrobleski on May 21, 1972. They had one daughter, Janessa Louise. He was a member of the Knights of Columbus, the Monongalia County Historical Society, the West Virginia State Historical Society, the Sons and Daughters of Italy, Kiwanis Club, and the Morgantown Landmarks Commission. He was Catholic and a member of St. Mary's Roman Catholic Church in Star City.

Pyles died on April 7, 2026, at the age of 80.
