= Alex Shook =

American politician

Member of the West Virginia House of Delegates from the 44th district
- Incumbent
- Assumed office 2006

Personal details
- Born: August 20, 1969 (age 57) Huntington, West Virginia
- Party: Democratic
- Spouse: Alicia
- Education: West Virginia University
- Profession: attorney, real estate development

Alex J. Shook (born August 20, 1969) is a Democratic member of the West Virginia House of Delegates, representing the 44th District since 2006.
