= Cindy Frich =

American politician (born 1960)

Member of the West Virginia House of Delegates from the 51st district
- In office December 1, 2012 – November 30, 2018
- Preceded by: Chris Walters
- Succeeded by: Danielle Walker

Member of the West Virginia House of Delegates from the 44th district
- In office December 1, 2002 – November 30, 2006
- Preceded by: Sheirl Fletcher
- Succeeded by: Alex Shook

Personal details
- Born: Cynthia Lynn Frich; March 19, 1960 (age 66) Pittsburgh, Pennsylvania, U.S.
- Party: Republican
- Education: Miami University (BA)

Cindy Lynne Frich (born March 19, 1960) is an American politician who previously served as a Republican member of the West Virginia House of Delegates.

== Personal life and education ==
Frich was born on March 19, 1960, in Pittsburgh, Pennsylvania, to John and Marlene Frich. She earned a bachelor’s degree in political science from Miami University in Oxford, Ohio and pursued postgraduate studies at West Virginia University, however, did not obtain a degree. Frich never married or pursued a career, and continues to live with her mother in Morgantown, West Virginia.

== Electoral history ==
=== 1990s ===
==== 1998 ====
Initially in District 44, Frich placed in the 1998 Republican Primary but lost the eight-way four-position November 3, 1998 General election.

=== 2000s ===
==== 2000 ====
Frich placed again in the 2000 Republican Primary, but lost the seven-way four-position November 7, 2000 General election.

==== 2002 ====
With incumbent Republican Representative Sheirl Fletcher leaving the Legislature and leaving a seat open, Frich ran in the 2002 Republican Primary and won the seat in the November 5, 2002 General election.

==== 2004 ====
Frich placed in the five-way 2004 Republican Primary, and was re-elected in the November 2, 2004 General election.

==== 2006 ====
Frich placed in the five-way 2006 Republican Primary, but lost the eight-way four-position November 7, 2006 General election, with Alex Shook winning Frich’s seat.

==== 2008 ====
Frich ran in the May 13, 2008 Republican Primary, placing first with 3,110 votes (62.8%), but placed fifth in the six-way four-position November 4, 2008 General election.

=== 2010s ===
==== 2010 ====
When Senate District 13 Democratic Senator Mike Oliverio retired and left the seat open, Frich ran unopposed in the May 11, 2010 Republican Primary, winning with 3,921 votes but lost the November 2, 2010 General election to Democratic Representative Robert Beach.

==== 2012 ====
Redistricted to District 51 alongside all four District 44 incumbents, Frich ran in the seven-way May 8, 2012 Republican Primary and placed first with 2,969 votes (21.9%) and placed second in the eleven-way five-position November 6, 2012 General election with 14,677 votes (11.7%).

==== 2018 ====
With five seats open in the 2018 General election, which was held on November 6, 2018, Frich placed seventh in a twelve-way election with 12,601 votes, 1,639 short of the final seat, losing to Barbara Fleischauer (D), John Williams (D), Rodney Pyles (D), Evan Hansen (D) and newcomer Danielle Walker (D).

==== 2020 ====
With five seats open in the 2020 General election, which was held on November 3, 2020, Frich placed sixth.
