= American Freedom Party =

Defunct American political party

- Chairperson: Ralph Brandt
- Founded: January 5, 2010; 16 years ago
- Dissolved: August 2026
- Headquarters: Westminster, California, United States
- Ideology: American nationalism; Anti-immigration; Paleoconservatism; White nationalism
- Political position: Far-right

Website
- americanfreedomparty.us (defunct, site archived)

The American Freedom Party (formerly the American Third Position Party or A3P) was a far-right white supremacist political party in the United States. In November 2009, it filed papers to be on a ballot in California, and was launched in January 2010. It was created after the collapse of the Golden State Party, a party founded by a group called Freedom 14, after its leader was exposed as a felon.

== Leadership ==
Logo of the American Third Position Party, the former name of the American Freedom Party

The party chairman was Los Angeles attorney William Daniel Johnson. Kevin B. MacDonald, a retired evolutionary psychology academic at California State University, Long Beach, was named one of the eight party directors. MacDonald is also a principal contributor to The Occidental Quarterly where his articles have claimed that traits that he attributes to Jews, including higher-than-average verbal intelligence and ethnocentrism, have eugenically and culturally evolved to enhance the ability of Jews to out-compete non-Jews for resources. MacDonald believes this advantage has been used by Jews to advance their group interests and end potential antisemitism by either deliberately or inadvertently undermining the power and self-confidence of the European-derived majorities in the Western world.

A 2006 article in The Nation magazine by Max Blumenthal reported that MacDonald's 2004 Understanding Jewish Influence: A Study in Ethnic Activism (originally published in the Occidental Quarterly) "has turned MacDonald into a celebrity within white nationalist and neo-Nazi circles." Writing in the Journal of Church and State, Professor George Michael wrote that MacDonald's work "has been well received by those in the racialist right, as it amounts to a theoretically sophisticated justification for anti-Semitism," and that on the far-right MacDonald "has attained a near reverential status and is generally considered beyond reproach".

== Electoral activities ==
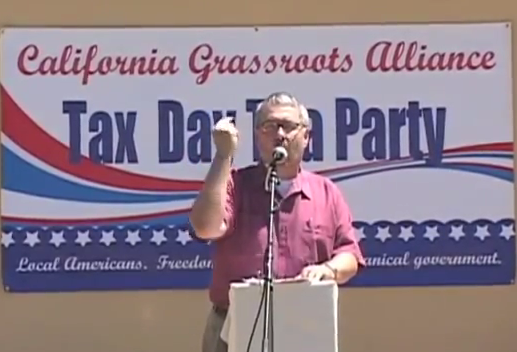
William Daniel Johnson, chairman of A3P, speaking at a Tea Party rally

New Hampshire state party chairman Ryan Murdough ran in the Republican primary for a seat representing the Eighth District of the Grafton County delegation to the New Hampshire House of Representatives, but he was refused support by the Republican party, which called him a "despicable racist". He placed fifth out of five candidates in the Republican primary, garnering 296 votes (11%). Murdough was the National Political Director for the National Socialist American Labor Party, a party which espouses Nazi beliefs.

In November 2009, the American Third Position Party filed papers with the office of the Secretary of State of California, with the intention of becoming a fully ballot-accessible party by the time of the June 2010 California primary election. However, the party failed to qualify and was not entered on the 2010 ballot in California or any other state. The party received enough signatures to get Harry Bertram on the ballot for the 2011 West Virginia gubernatorial special election. Bertram's campaign ran a television ad emphasizing his desire to advance the interests of white Americans. Bertram was soundly defeated in the election, coming in last place out of 5 candidates on the ballot and netting only 1,111 votes; less than 0.4 percent of the total.

=== 2012 presidential election ===
In January 2012, the American Third Position Party announced Merlin Miller as its presidential nominee for the 2012 presidential election. Virginia Abernethy was announced as his running mate. According to an AmericanFreedomUnion.com posting, they obtained ballot access in Colorado, New Jersey, and Tennessee. Miller got 2,669 votes in these states.

=== 2016 presidential election ===
Kenn Gividen was nominated by the party as its candidate for president and Bob Whitaker was nominated for vice president in March 2015. Gividen resigned from the nomination on July 26, 2015, after holding the role for 4 months; Whitaker then stepped into the role as candidate for president. Tom Bowie took Whitaker's place as the vice president candidate. Whitaker, whose favored term "White Genocide" was blocked by the AFP leadership, gave up the nomination on April 7, 2016, in protest over the party's growing support for Donald Trump and the toning down of its use of language.

=== Electoral results ===
Year	Office	Candidate	On the ballot as	Votes	Position
2011	Governor of West Virginia	Harry Bertram	American Third Position	1,111 (0.37%)	5/5
2012	West Virginia House of Delegates, District 51	Harry Bertram	American Third Position	1,110 (0.88%)	11/11
2012	President of the United States	Merlin Miller & Virginia Abernethy	American Third Position	2,703 (0.00%)	18/27

== History ==
=== Origins ===
The party traces its roots to a California-based white power skinhead group that called itself "Freedom 14", a name partially derived from the Fourteen Words slogan created by neo-Nazi David Lane. In 2009, the members of Freedom 14 announced the creation of a new political party called the "Golden State Party" on Don Black's hate site Stormfront. When the Orange County Register revealed that Golden State Party spokesperson Tyler Cole had felony assault and weapons charges, the group abandoned the name and formed American 3P, before changing the name again to American Third Position. When Bill Johnson took over the group, the name was changed to the American Freedom Party.

=== 2012 hacking incident ===
In early February 2012, members of the hacker group Anonymous released statements claiming to have hacked the website of the party and various forums and email accounts connected with the group, including that of Jamie Kelso, the website's operator. The front page of the party's website was defaced with #OpBlitzkrieg (the designated name used in January 2012 for a series of Anonymous cyber-attacks on German neo-Nazi websites) and private information about the organization's members was released.

== See also ==
- National Justice Party
