= 2010 West Virginia House of Delegates election =

- November 2, 2010

All 100 seats in the West Virginia House of Delegates 51 seats needed for a majority

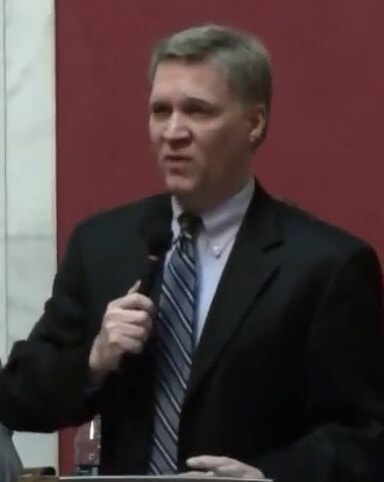
	Majority party	Minority party
Leader	Rick Thompson	Tim Armstead
Party	Democratic	Republican
Leader's seat	17th–Lavalette	32nd–Elkview
Last election	71 seats, 64.47%	29 seats, 34.84%
Seats won	65	35
Seat change	▼6	▲6
Popular vote	610,790	467,752
Percentage	56.02%	42.90%
Swing	▼8.45 pp	▲8.06 pp
- Democratic gain Democratic hold Republican gain Republican hold Multi-member districts: Democratic majority Republican majority Even split Democratic: 40–50% 50–60% 60–70% 70–80% 80–90% Unopposed; Republican: 50–60% 60–70% 70–80% 70–80% Unopposed
Speaker before election
Rick Thompson
Democratic
Elected Speaker
Rick Thompson
Democratic

Elections to the West Virginia House of Delegates were held on November 2, 2010, to elect 100 candidates to the House to serve a two-year term. In a national environment widely characterized as a red wave, Republicans broke the Democrats' supermajority status in the House. Of the 100 seats up for election, Democrats won sixty-five and the Republicans thirty-five, a net gain of six for the Republicans.

This election took place alongside races for U.S. Senate, U.S. House, state senate, and numerous other state and local elections.

== Results ==
=== Overall ===
2010 West Virginia House of Delegates general election results and statistics
Party	Candidates		Seats	Aggregate votes		2008 general		Change	
Party	Prim.	Gen.	Seats	No.	Percent	Seats	Vote %	Seats	Vote %
Democratic		90	65	610,790	56.02%	65	64.47%	−6	−8.45 pp
Republican		72	35	467,75	42.90%	29	34.84%	+6	+8.06 pp
Independents	—	4	0	8,251	0.76%	0	0.22%	—	+0.54 pp
Mountain		2	0	2,791	0.26%	0	0.40%	—	−0.14 pp
Libertarian		1	0	747	0.07%	DNC		—	
Totals		169	100	1,395,185	100%	100	—	—	—
Turnout				535,152	44.01%	—	57.92%	—	−13.91 pp
Registered voters				1,216,023					

== General election results ==
General election results sourced from the West Virginia Secretary of State.

=== Single-member districts ===
District	Democratic			Republican			Others			Total		
District	Candidate	Votes	%	Candidate	Votes	%	Candidate	Votes	%	Votes	Plr.	Mrg.
5th	Dave Pethtel (incumbent)	3,835	100.00%	—	—	—	—	—	—	3,835	3,835	100.00%
6th	Charles Ray Delauder	1,568	30.29%	William Romine (incumbent)	3,608	69.71%	—	—	—	5,176	−2,040	−39.41%
7th	—	—	—	Lynwood Ireland (incumbent)	4,486	100.00%	—	—	—	4,486	4,486	100.00%
8th	—	—	—	Bob Ashley	4,530	100.00%	—	—	—	4,530	4,530	100.00%
9th	Francis James Marion	2,068	36.71%	Larry Border (incumbent)	3,566	63.29%	—	—	—	5,634	−1,498	−26.59%
11th	—	—	—	Robert Ashley	3,266	80.94%	Mark Steven Myers D.C (Mtn.)	769	19.06%	4,035	−2,497	−61.88%
12th	Jo Boggess Phillips	3,261	49.08%	Mitch Carmichael (incumbent)	3,383	50.92%	—	—	—	6,644	−122	−1.84%
18th	Larry Barker (incumbent)	3,436	76.71%	Lawrence B. Lyon Jr.	1,043	23.29%	—	—	—	4,479	2,393	53.43%
20th	Steve Kominar (incumbent)	3,410	100.00%	—	—	—	—	—	—	3,410	3,410	100.00%
21st	Harry Keith White (incumbent)	2,593	100.00%	—	—	—	—	—	—	2,593	2,593	100.00%
23rd	Clif Moore (incumbent)	2,471	100.00%	—	—	—	—	—	—	2,471	2,471	100.00%
24th	—	—	—	Gary Gearheart	2,797	100.00%	—	—	—	2,797	2,797	100.00%
26th	Gerald Crosier (incumbent)	2,805	56.09%	Roy Gale Cooper	2,196	43.91%	—	—	—	5,001	609	12.18%
31st	Meshea La'Shawn Poore	2,807	70.53%	Pamela Kate Minimah	935	23.49%	Janet Louise Thompson (Ind.)	238	5.98%	3,980	1,872	47.04%
33rd	David Walker (incumbent)	3,325	100.00%	—	—	—	—	—	—	3,325	3,325	100.00%
34th	Brent Boggs (incumbent)	4,131	100.00%	—	—	—	—	—	—	4,131	4,131	100.00%
35th	Sam Argento† (incumbent)	2,153	40.69%	Harold Sigler	3,138	59.31%	—	—	—	5,291	−985	−18.62%
36th	Joseph B. Talbott (incumbent)	2,555	71.73%	—	—	—	Duane D. Borchers Sr. (Ind.)	1,007	28.27%	3,562	1,548	43.46%
38th	Margaret Smith (incumbent)	4,291	100.00%	—	—	—	—	—	—	4,291	4,291	100.00%
39th	—	—	—	Bill Hamilton (incumbent)	4,765	100.00%	—	—	—	4,765	−4,765	−100.00%
40th	Mary Poling (incumbent)	3,568	62.31%	Lonnie Lee Moore Sr.	2,158	37.69%	—	—	—	5,726	1,410	24.62%
42nd	Mike Manypenny (incumbent)	3,223	54.18%	Jeffery L. Tansill	2,726	45.82%	—	—	—	5,949	497	8.35%
45th	Larry Williams (incumbent)	4,758	100.00%	—	—	—	—	—	—	4,758	4,758	100.00%
46th	Stanley Shaver (incumbent)	3,171	50.43%	Deborah R. Stevens	3,117	49.57%	—	—	—	6,288	54	0.86%
47th	Harold Michael (incumbent)	4,704	100.00%	—	—	—	—	—	—	4,704	4,704	100.00%
48th	—	—	—	Allen V. Evans (incumbent)	4,794	100.00%	—	—	—	4,794	4,794	100.00%
49th	Charles Edward Messick	2,345	43.86%	Gary Howell	3,001	56.14%	—	—	—	5,346	−656	−12.27%
50th	Alan Mitchell Davis	1,547	28.14%	Ruth Rowan (incumbent)	3,950	71.86%	—	—	—	5,497	−2,403	−43.71%
51st	Alton Earl Wolfe Jr.	1,628	28.77%	Daryl Cowles (incumbent)	4,030	71.23%	—	—	—	5,658	−2,402	42.45%
52nd	Michael Kirk Roberts	2,810	42.93%	Larry Kump	3,735	57.07%	—	—	—	6,545	−925	−14.13%
53rd	Robert Vincent Mills	1,650	30.85%	Jonathan Miller (incumbent)	3,699	69.15%	—	—	—	5,349	−2,049	−38.31%
54th	Michael Jason Barrett	1,954	43.65%	Walter Duke (incumbent)	2,523	56.35%	—	—	—	4,477	−569	−12.71%
55th	Donn E. Marshall	2,376	39.44%	John Overington (incumbent)	3,648	60.56%	—	—	—	6,024	−1,272	−21.12%
56th	Terry Lee Walker	2,573	43.65%	Eric Householder	3,322	56.35%	—	—	—	5,895	−749	−12.71%
57th	John Doyle (incumbent)	3,661	54.21%	Elliot Mark Simon	3,092	45.79%	—	—	—	6,753	569	8.43%
58th	Tiffany Lawrence (incumbent)	3,133	53.41%	Alan Blake Thompson	2,733	46.59%	—	—	—	5,866	400	6.82%

=== Multi-member districts ===
District	Seats	Democratic			Republican			Others			Total		
District	Seats	Candidate	Votes	%	Candidate	Votes	%	Candidate	Votes	%	Votes	Plr.	Mrg.
1st	2-seat	Randy Swartzmiller (incumbent)	6,853	43.41%	—	—	—	Amanda M. Mesler (Ind.)	4,447	28.17%	15,785	38	0.24%
1st	2-seat	Ronnie Jones	4,485	28.41%	—	—	—	—	—	—	15,785	38	0.24%
2nd	2-seat	Tim Ennis (incumbent)	7,338	53.83%	—	—	—	—	—	—	13,631	6,293	100.00%
2nd	2-seat	Roy Givens (incumbent)	6,293	46.17%	—	—	—	—	—	—	13,631	6,293	100.00%
3rd	2-seat	Ryan Ferns	4,958	25.87%	Erikka Lynn Storch	5,410	28.23%	—	—	—	19,163	440	2.30%
3rd	2-seat	Shawn Fluharty	4,277	22.32%	Adolph William Santorine Jr.	4,518	23.58%	—	—	—	19,163	440	2.30%
4th	2-seat	Scott Varner (incumbent)	7,557	52.29%	—	—	—	—	—	—	14,451	6,894	100.00%
4th	2-seat	Michael Ferro (incumbent)	6,894	47.71%	—	—	—	—	—	—	14,451	6,894	100.00%
10th	3-seat	Daniel Poling (incumbent)	8,592	23.38%	John Ellem (incumbent)	10,307	28.05%	—	—	—	36,744	600	1.63%
10th	3-seat	—	—	—	Thomas Azinger (incumbent)	9,853	26.82%	—	—	—	36,744	600	1.63%
10th	3-seat	—	—	—	Fred D. Gillespie	7,992	21.75%	—	—	—	36,744	600	1.63%
13th	2-seat	Brady Paxton (incumbent)	6,175	35.04%	Brian Ray Scott	5,639	31.99%	—	—	—	17,625	172	0.98%
13th	2-seat	Dale F. Martin (incumbent)	5,811	32.97%	—	—	—	—	—	—	17,625	172	0.98%
14th	2-seat	Catherine L. Larck	5,355	26.44%	Troy Andes (incumbent)	8,159	40.28%	—	—	—	20,255	−1,386	−6.84%
14th	2-seat	—	—	—	Brian Savilla	6,741	33.28%	—	—	—	20,255	−1,386	−6.84%
15th	3-seat	Kevin Craig (incumbent)	6,886	20.59%	Carol Miller (incumbent)	6,601	19.74%	—	—	—	33,447	295	0.88%
15th	3-seat	Jim Morgan (incumbent)	6,188	18.50%	Patrick Allen Lucas	4,408	13.18%	—	—	—	33,447	295	0.88%
15th	3-seat	Matthew James Woelfel	5,893	17.62%	Douglas W. Franklin	3,471	10.38%	—	—	—	33,447	295	0.88%
16th	3-seat	Doug Reynolds (incumbent)	8,900	26.43%	Kelli Sobonya (incumbent)	10,026	29.78%	—	—	—	33,669	1,405	4.17%
16th	3-seat	Dale Stephens (incumbent)	8,074	23.98%	Tomma Anne See	6,669	19.81%	—	—	—	33,669	1,405	4.17%
16th	3-seat	—	—	—	—	—	—	—	—	—	33,669	1,405	4.17%
17th	2-seat	Rick Thompson (incumbent)	6,509	52.42%	—	—	—	—	—	—	12,418	5,909	100.00%
17th	2-seat	Don Perdue (incumbent)	5,909	47.58%	—	—	—	—	—	—	12,418	5,909	100.00%
19th	4-seat	Ralph Rodighiero (incumbent)	10,372	21.59%	Chad Ryan Story	5,140	10.70%	—	—	—	48,042	3,532	7.35%
19th	4-seat	Gregory Butcher (incumbent)	9,706	20.20%	Elias Clark Gregory	4,861	10.12%	—	—	—	48,042	3,532	7.35%
19th	4-seat	Josh Stowers (incumbent)	9,291	19.34%	—	—	—	—	—	—	48,042	3,532	7.35%
19th	4-seat	Rupie Phillips	8,672	18.05%	—	—	—	—	—	—	48,042	3,532	7.35%
22nd	2-seat	Linda Phillips (incumbent)	4,357	40.04%	Shawn Raymond Spears	2,812	25.84%	—	—	—	10,882	901	8.28%
22nd	2-seat	Daniel Hall (incumbent)	3,713	34.12%	—	—	—	—	—	—	10,882	901	8.28%
25th	2-seat	John R. Frazier (incumbent)	6,095	34.48%	Joe Ellington	4,693	26.55%	—	—	—	17,679	833	4.71%
25th	2-seat	Billy Joe Morefield	3,031	17.14%	Charles Edward Terry Jr.	3,860	21.83%	—	—	—	17,679	833	4.71%
27th	5-seat	Rick Moye (incumbent)	11,644	12.05%	Linda Sumner (incumbent)	13,784	14.27%	—	—	—	96,611	805	0.83%
27th	5-seat	William R. Wooton (incumbent)	11,038	11.43%	Rick Snuffer	12,299	12.73%	—	—	—	96,611	805	0.83%
27th	5-seat	Sally Susman (incumbent)	10,233	10.59%	John O'Neal	11,591	12.00%	—	—	—	96,611	805	0.83%
27th	5-seat	Melvin Ray Kessler	8,951	9.26%	Richard Eugene Franklin	8,516	8.81%	—	—	—	96,611	805	0.83%
27th	5-seat	Virginia Mahan (incumbent)	8,555	8.86%	—	—	—	—	—	—	96,611	805	0.83%
28th	2-seat	Thomas Campbell (incumbent)	6,152	39.39%	Ray Canterbury (incumbent)	6,254	40.04%	—	—	—	15,620	2,938	18.81%
28th	2-seat	Michael Shawn Knisely	3,214	20.58%	—	—	—	—	—	—	15,620	2,938	18.81%
29th	3-seat	Margaret Anne Staggers (incumbent)	7,309	28.02%	Marshall Clay	4,752	18.22%	—	—	—	26,087	2,105	8.07%
29th	3-seat	David Perry (incumbent)	7,169	27.48%	—	—	—	—	—	—	26,087	2,105	8.07%
29th	3-seat	John Pino	6,857	26.29%	—	—	—	—	—	—	26,087	2,105	8.07%
30th	7-seat	Doug Skaff (incumbent)	19,335	8.79%	Eric Nelson	17,603	8.00%	—	—	—	220,086	615	0.28%
30th	7-seat	Danny Wells (incumbent)	17,197	7.81%	Fred H. Joseph	15,329	6.97%	—	—	—	220,086	615	0.28%
30th	7-seat	Barbara Hatfield (incumbent)	17,186	7.81%	Brian F. Hicks	15,001	6.82%	—	—	—	220,086	615	0.28%
30th	7-seat	Bonnie Brown (incumbent)	16,920	7.69%	Michael S. Hall	14,923	6.78%	—	—	—	220,086	615	0.28%
30th	7-seat	Mark Hunt	16,498	7.50%	James W. Strawn	14,180	6.44%	—	—	—	220,086	615	0.28%
30th	7-seat	Nancy Peoples Guthrie (incumbent)	16,301	7.41%	Daniel Richard Barnett	12,119	5.51%	—	—	—	220,086	615	0.28%
30th	7-seat	Sharon Spencer (incumbent)	15,686	7.13%	Steven Sweeney	11,808	5.37%	—	—	—	220,086	615	0.28%
32nd	3-seat	Clint Adison Casto	4,216	10.70%	Tim Armstead (incumbent)	9,087	23.06%	Jesse Johnson (Mtn.)	2,022	5.13%	39,402	−3,813	−9.68%
32nd	3-seat	Philip Scott Lavigne	4,149	10.53%	Ronald N. Walters (incumbent)	8,251	20.94%	—	—	—	39,402	−3,813	−9.68%
32nd	3-seat	Charles Foster Black	3,648	9.26%	Patrick Lane (incumbent)	8,029	20.38%	—	—	—	39,402	−3,813	−9.68%
37th	2-seat	Denise Lynne Campbell	6,328	35.79%	Wilda Joan Sharp	5,399	30.54%	—	—	—	17,681	555	3.14%
37th	2-seat	William G. Hartman (incumbent)	5,954	33.67%	—	—	—	—	—	—	17,681	555	3.14%
41st	4-seat	Tim Miley (incumbent)	11,894	15.07%	Daniel Hamrick	9,865	12.50%	—	—	—	78,907	1,303	1.65%
41st	4-seat	Richard Iaquinta (incumbent)	11,796	14.95%	Laura Diana Bartley	8,896	11.27%	—	—	—	78,907	1,303	1.65%
41st	4-seat	Sam Cann (incumbent)	11,516	14.59%	Edward Wayne Randolph	6,992	8.86%	—	—	—	78,907	1,303	1.65%
41st	4-seat	Ron Fragale (incumbent)	11,168	14.15%	William Michael Griffith	6,780	8.59%	—	—	—	78,907	1,303	1.65%
43rd	3-seat	Mike Caputo (incumbent)	11,409	22.73%	Rickie Ray Starn	7,448	14.84%	—	—	—	50,202	3,026	6.03%
43rd	3-seat	Linda Longstreth (incumbent)	10,597	21.11%	Travis Lee Blosser	5,276	10.51%	—	—	—	50,202	3,026	6.03%
43rd	3-seat	Tim Manchin (incumbent)	10,474	20.86%	Lynette Mae McQuain	4,998	9.96%	—	—	—	50,202	3,026	6.03%
44th	4-seat	Charlene Marshall (incumbent)	12,003	15.41%	Amanda Pasdon	9,736	12.50%	Paul Burton Brown (Ind.)	2,559	3.29%	77,879	688	0.88%
44th	4-seat	Barbara Fleischauer (incumbent)	11,460	14.72%	Chris Walters	8,806	11.31%	Tad Britch (Lbt.)	747	0.96%	77,879	688	0.88%
44th	4-seat	Anthony Barill	9,494	12.19%	Kevin Scott Poe	8,273	10.62%	—	—	—	77,879	688	0.88%
44th	4-seat	Stephen Lee Cook	8,445	10.84%	Kevin Lee Patrick Jr	6,356	8.16%	—	—	—	77,879	688	0.88%

== See also ==
- List of West Virginia state legislatures
