= List of members of the 80th West Virginia House of Delegates =

This is a list of members of the 80th West Virginia House of Delegates. It contains members of the West Virginia House of Delegates for the 80th West Virginia Legislature, which convened in January 2011.

== Leadership of the 80th West Virginia House of Delegates ==
Position	Name	Party	District	County
Speaker of the House	Richard Thompson	Democratic	17	Wayne Co.
Speaker pro tempore	Ron Fragale	Democratic	41	Harrison Co.
Majority Leader	Brent Boggs	Democratic	34	Braxton Co.
Minority Leader	Tim Armstead	Republican	32	Kanawha Co.
Majority Whip	Mike Caputo	Democratic	43	Marion Co.
Minority Whip	Mitch Carmichael	Republican	12	Jackson Co.

== Members of the 80th West Virginia House of Delegates, by District ==
District	Representative	Party	County of Residence
1	Ronnie D. Jones	Dem	Hancock
1	Randy Swartzmiller	Dem	Hancock
2	Philip W. Diserio	Dem	Brooke
2	Roy E. Givens	Dem	Brooke
3	Ryan Ferns	Rep	Ohio
3	Erikka Storch	Rep	Ohio
4	Michael T. Ferro	Dem	Marshall
4	Scott Varner	Dem	Marshall
5	Dave Pethtel	Dem	Wetzel
6	Wm. Roger Romine	Rep	Tyler
7	Lynwood "Woody" Ireland	Rep	Ritchie
8	William Anderson	Rep	Wood
9	Anna Border	Rep	Wood
10	Tom Azinger	Rep	Wood
10	John N. Ellem	Rep	Wood
10	Daniel Poling	Dem	Wood
11	Bob Ashley	Rep	Roane
12	Mitch B. Carmichael	Rep	Jackson
13	Helen Martin	Dem	Putnam
13	Brady Paxton	Dem	Putnam
14	Troy Andes	Rep	Putnam
14	Brian Savilla	Rep	Putnam
15	Kevin Craig	Dem	Cabell
15	Carol Miller	Rep	Cabell
15	Jim Morgan	Dem	Cabell
16	Doug Reynolds	Dem	Cabell
16	Kelli Sobonya	Rep	Cabell
16	Dale Stephens	Dem	Cabell
17	Rick Thompson	Dem	Wayne
17	Don Perdue	Dem	Wayne
18	Larry W. Barker	Dem	Boone
19	Greg Butcher	Dem	Logan
19	Rupie Phillips	Dem	Logan
19	Ralph Rodighiero	Dem	Logan
19	Josh Stowers	Dem	Lincoln
20	Justin Marcum	Dem	Mingo
21	Harry Keith White	Dem	Mingo
22	Daniel J. Hall	Dem	Wyoming
22	Linda Goode Phillips	Dem	Wyoming
23	Clif Moore	Dem	McDowell
24	Marty Gearheart	Rep	Mercer
25	Joe Ellington	Rep	Mercer
25	John Frazier	Dem	Mercer
26	Gerald Crosier	Dem	Monroe
27	Virginia Mahan	Dem	Summers
27	Rick Moye	Dem	Raleigh
27	John O'Neal	Rep	Raleigh
27	Rick Snuffer	Rep	Raleigh
27	Linda Sumner	Rep	Raleigh
28	Thomas W. Campbell	Dem	Greenbrier
28	Ray Canterbury	Rep	Greenbrier
29	David Perry	Dem	Fayette
29	John Pino	Dem	Fayette
29	Margaret Anne Staggers	Dem	Fayette
30	Bonnie Brown	Dem	Kanawha
30	Nancy Peoples Guthrie	Dem	Kanawha
30	Barbara Hatfield	Dem	Kanawha
30	Mark Hunt	Dem	Kanawha
30	Eric Nelson	Rep	Kanawha
30	Doug Skaff	Dem	Kanawha
30	Danny Wells	Dem	Kanawha
31	Meshea Poore	Dem	Kanawha
32	Tim Armstead	Rep	Kanawha
32	Patrick Lane	Rep	Kanawha
32	Ron Walters	Rep	Kanawha
33	David Walker	Dem	Clay
34	Brent Boggs	Dem	Braxton
35	Harold Sigler	Rep	Nicholas
36	Joseph Talbott	Dem	Webster
37	Denise L. Campbell	Dem	Randolph
37	Bill Hartman	Dem	Randolph
38	Peggy Donaldson Smith	Dem	Lewis
39	Bill Hamilton	Rep	Upshur
40	Mary M. Poling	Dem	Barbour
41	Sam Cann	Dem	Harrison
41	Ron Fragale	Dem	Harrison
41	Richard Iaquinta	Dem	Harrison
41	Tim Miley	Dem	Harrison
42	Mike Manypenny	Dem	Taylor
43	Mike Caputo	Dem	Marion
43	Linda Longstreth	Dem	Marion
43	Tim Manchin	Dem	Marion
44	Anthony Barill	Dem	Monongalia
44	Barbara Evans Fleischauer	Dem	Monongalia
44	Charlene Marshall	Dem	Monongalia
44	Amanda Pasdon	Rep	Monongalia
45	Larry A. Williams	Dem	Preston
46	Stan Shaver	Dem	Preston
47	Harold Michael	Dem	Hardy
48	Allen V. Evans	Rep	Grant
49	Gary G. Howell	Rep	Mineral
50	Ruth Rowan	Rep	Hampshire
51	Daryl Cowles	Rep	Morgan
52	Larry Kump	Rep	Berkeley
53	Jonathan Miller	Rep	Berkeley
54	Walter Duke	Rep	Berkeley
55	John Overington	Rep	Berkeley
56	Eric Householder	Rep	Jefferson
57	John Doyle	Dem	Jefferson
58	Tiffany Lawrence	Dem	Jefferson

== See also ==
- West Virginia House of Delegates
  - List of speakers of the West Virginia House of Delegates
  - List of members of the 79th West Virginia House of Delegates
  - List of members of the 78th West Virginia House of Delegates
  - List of members of the 77th West Virginia House of Delegates
- West Virginia Senate
  - List of presidents of the West Virginia Senate
  - List of members of the 79th West Virginia Senate
  - List of members of the 78th West Virginia Senate
  - List of members of the 77th West Virginia Senate
