= List of members of the 77th West Virginia House of Delegates =

This list of members of the 77th West Virginia House of Delegates lists the members of the House of Delegates for the 77th West Virginia Legislature.

== House of Delegates Leadership ==
- Speaker of the House
  - Robert S. Kiss (D), Raleigh Co., 27th District
- Speaker Pro Tempore
  - John Pino (D), Fayette Co., 29th District
- Majority Leader
  - W. Richard Staton (D), Wyoming Co., 22nd District
- Minority Leader
  - Charles S. Trump, IV (R), Morgan Co., 51st District
- Majority Whip
  - Scott Varner (D), Marshall Co., 4th District
- Minority Whip
  - Larry Border (R), Wood Co., 9th District

== Alphabetical List of Members in the House of Delegates ==
- Jon Amores (D-30th District)
- William Anderson (R-8th District)
- Sam J. Argento (D-35th District)
- Tim Armstead (R-32nd District)
- Bob Ashley (R-11th District)
- Tom Azinger (R-10th District)
- Larry W. Barker (D-18th District)
- Robert D. Beach (D-44th District)
- J.D. Beane (D-10th District)
- Craig P. Blair (R-52nd District)
- Brent Boggs (D-34th District)
- Larry Border (R-9th District)
- Bonnie Brown (D-30th District)
- Richard Browning (D-22nd District)
- Greg Butcher (D-19th District)
- Thomas A. Campbell (D-28th District)
- Samuel J. Cann, Sr. (D-41st District)
- Ray Canterbury (R-28th District)
- Mike Caputo (D-43rd District)
- Mitch Carmichael (R-12th District)
- Kevin J. Craig (D-15th District)
- Gerald L. Crosier (D-26th District)
- Joe DeLong (D-1st District)
- John Doyle (D-57th District)
- Walter E. Duke (R-54th District)
- Jeff Eldridge (D-19th District)
- John N. Ellem (R-10th District)
- Timothy R. Ennis (D-2nd District)
- Allen V. Evans (R-48th District)
- Joe C. Ferrell (D-19th District)
- Ron Fragale (D-41st District)
- Eustace Frederick (D-24th District)
- Cindy Frich (R-44th District)
- Mike Hall (R-14th District)
- Bill Hamilton (R-39th District)
- William G. Hartman (D-37th District)
- Barbara Hatfield (D-30th District)
- Nancy Houston (D-44th District)
- Greg Howard (R-16th District)
- Lidella Wilson Hrutkay (D-19th District)
- Mark Hunt (D-30th District)
- Richard J. Iaquinta (D-41st District)
- 'Robert S. Kiss (D-27th District)
- K. Steven Kominar (D-20th District)
- Patrick Lane (R-32nd District)
- Margarette R. Leach (D-15th District)
- Otis A. Leggett (R-7th District)
- Marshall Long (D-25th District)
- Linda Longstreth (D-43rd District)
- Tom Louisos (D-29th District)
- Virginia Mahan (D-27th District)
- Tim Manchin (D-43rd District)
- Charlene Marshall (D-44th District)
- Dale Martin (D-13th District)
- Harold Michael (D-47th District)
- Tim Miley (D-41st District)
- Cliff Moore (D-23rd District)
- Jim Morgan (D-15th District)
- John Overington (R-55th District)
- Corey L. Palumbo (D-30th District)
- Brady Paxton (D-13th District)
- Don Perdue (D-17th District)
- David G. Perry (D-29th District)
- David Pethtel (D-5th District)
- John Pino (D-29th District)
- Mary M. Poling (D-40th District)
- Thomas Mike Porter (R-25th District)
- Bill Proudfoot (D-37th District)
- Victor A. Roberts, Jr. (R-53rd District)
- William R. Romine (R-6th District)
- Ruth Rowan (R-50th District)
- Robert A. Schadler (R-49th District)
- Pattie Eagloski Schoen (R-14th District)
- Kelli Sobonya (R-16th District)
- Sharon Spencer (D-30th District)
- Douglas Stalnaker (D-38th District)
- W. Richard Staton (D-22nd District)
- William Stemple (D-33rd District)
- Dale Stephens (D-16th District)
- Debbie Stevens (R-46th District)
- Linda Sumner (R-27th District)
- Sally Susman (D-27th District)
- Randy Swartzmiller (D-1st District)
- Robert C. Tabb (D-56th District)
- Joe Talbott (D-36th District)
- Jeffery L. Tansill (R-42nd District)
- Richard Thompson (D-17th District)
- Ron Thompson (D-27th District)
- Charles S. Trump, IV (R-51st District)
- Kenneth Tucker (D-4th District)
- Scott Varner (D-4th District)
- Christopher Wakim (R-3rd District)
- Ron Walters (R-32nd District)
- Carrie Webster (D-31st District)
- Danny Wells (D-30th District)
- Harry Keith White (D-21st District)
- L. Gil White (R-3rd District)
- Larry A. Williams (D-45th District)
- Locke Wysong (D-58th District)
- Jack Yost (D-2nd District)

== List of Members in the House of Delegates by District ==
- 1st District
  - Joe DeLong (D-Hancock Co.)
  - Randy Swartzmiller (D-Hancock Co.)
- 2nd District
  - Jack Yost (D-Brooke Co.)
  - Timothy R. Ennis (D-Brooke Co.)
- 3rd District
  - L. Gil White (R-Ohio Co.)
  - Christopher Wakim (R-Ohio Co.)
- 4th District
  - Scott G. Varner (D-Marshall Co.)
  - Kenneth G. Tucker (D-Marshall Co.)
- 5th District
  - Dave Pethtel (D-Wetzel Co.)
- 6th District
  - Roger Romine (R-Tyler Co.)
- 7th District
  - Otis A. Leggett (R-Pleasants Co.)
- 8th District
  - E.W. Bill Anderson (R-Wood Co.)
- 9th District
  - Larry Border (R-Wood Co.)
- 10th District
  - John Ellern (R-Wood Co.)
  - J.D. Beane (D-Wood Co.)
  - Tom Azinger (R-Wood Co.)
- 11th District
  - Bob Ashley (R-Roane Co.)
- 12th District
  - Mitch Carmichael (R-Jackson Co.)
- 13th District
  - Dale Martin (D-Putnam Co.)
  - Brady Paxton (D-Putnam Co.)
- 14th District
  - Mike Hall (R-Putnam Co.)
  - Patti Eagloski Schoen (R-Putnam Co.)
- 15th District
  - Kevin J. Craig (D-Cabell Co.)
  - James H. Morgan (D-Cabell Co.)
  - Margarette Leach (D-Cabell Co.)
- 16th District
  - Kelli Sobonya (R-Cabell Co.)
  - Dale Stephens (D-Cabell Co.)
  - Greg Howard (R-Cabell Co.)
- 17th District
  - Richard Thompson (D-Cabell Co.)
  - Don Perdue (D-Wayne Co.)
- 18th District
  - Larry Barker (D-Boone Co.)
- 19th District
  - Lidella Wilson Hrutkay (D-Logan Co.)
  - Joe Ferrell (D-Logan Co.)
  - Greg Butcher (D-Logan Co.)
  - Jeff Eldridge (D-Logan Co.)
- 20th District
  - K. Steven Kominar (D-Mingo Co.)
- 21st District
  - Harry Keith White (D-Mingo Co.)
- 22nd District
  - Richard W. Staton (D-Wyoming Co.)
  - Richard Browning (D-Wyoming Co.)
- 23rd District
  - Cliff Moore (D-McDowell Co.)
- 24th District
  - Eustace Frederick (D-Mercer Co.)
- 25th District
  - Marshall Long (D-Mercer Co.)
  - Thomas Porter (R-Mercer Co.)
- 26th District
  - Gerald Crosier (D-Monroe Co.)
- 27th District
  - Ron M. Thompson (D-Raleigh Co.)
  - Linda Sumner (R-Raleigh Co.)
  - Virginia Mahan (D-Summers Co.)
  - Sally Matz Susman (D-Raleigh Co.)
  - Robert S. Kiss (D-Raleigh Co.)
- 28th District
  - Ray Canterbury (R-Greenbrier Co.)
  - Thomas W. Campbell (D-Greenbrier Co.)
- 29th District
  - David G. Perry (D-Fayette Co.)
  - John Pino (D-Fayette Co.)
  - Tom Louisos (D-Fayette Co.)
- 30th District
  - Sharon Spencer (D-Kanawha Co.)
  - Mark Hunt (D-Kanawha Co.)
  - Barbara Hatfield (D-Kanawha Co.)
  - Bonnie Brown (D-Kanawha Co.)
  - Corey L. Palumbo (D-Kanawha Co.)
  - Jon Amores (D-Kanawha Co.)
  - Danny Wells (D-Kanawha Co.)
- 31st District
  - Carrie Webster (D-Kanawha Co.)
- 32nd District
  - Ron Walters (R-Kanawha Co.)
  - Patrick Lane (R-Kanawha Co.)
  - Tim Armstead (R-Kanawha Co.)
- 33rd District
  - William F. Stemple (D-Calhoun Co.)
- 34th District
  - Brent Boggs (D-Braxton Co.)
- 35th District
  - Sam Argento (D-Nicholas Co.)
- 36th District
  - Joe Talbott (D-Webster Co.)
- 37th District
  - William G. Hartman (D-Randolph Co.)
  - Bill Proudfoot (D-Randolph Co.)
- 38th District
  - Douglas K. Stalnaker (D-Lewis Co.)
- 39th District
  - Bill Hamilton (R-Upshur Co.)
- 40th District
  - Mary M. Poling (D-Barbour Co.)
- 41st District
  - Tim Miley (D-Harrison Co.)
  - Richard J. Iaquinta (D-Harrison Co.)
  - Ron Fragale (D-Harrison Co.)
  - Samuel J. Cann (D-Harrison Co.)
- 42nd District
  - Jeffery Tansill (R-Taylor Co.)
- 43rd District
  - Tim Manchin (D-Marion Co.)
  - Linda Longstreth (D-Marion Co.)
  - Mike Caputo (D-Marion Co.)
- 44th District
  - Robert D. Beach (D-Monongalia Co.)
  - Nancy Houston (D-Monongalia Co.)
  - Cindy Frich (R-Monongalia Co.)
  - Charlene Marshall (D-Monongalia Co.)
- 45th District
  - Larry A. Williams (D-Preston Co.)
- 46th District
  - Debbie Stevens (R-Tucker Co.)
- 47th District
  - Harold Michael (D-Hardy Co.)
- 48th District
  - Allen Evans (R-Grant Co.)
- 49th District
  - Robert A. Schadler (R-Mineral Co.)
- 50th District
  - Ruth Rowan (R-Hampshire Co.)
- 51st District
  - Charles S. Trump, IV (R-Morgan Co.)
- 52nd District
  - Craig P. Blair (R-Berkeley Co.)
- 53rd District
  - Victor A. Roberts (R-Berkeley Co.)
- 54th District
  - Walter E. Duke (R-Berkeley Co.)
- 55th District
  - John Overington (R-Berkeley Co.)
- 56th District
  - Robert C. Tabb (D-Jefferson Co.)
- 57th District
  - John Doyle (D-Jefferson Co.)
- 58th District
  - Locke Wysong (D-Jefferson Co.)

== List of Members in the House of Delegates by County of Residence ==
- Barbour County
  - Mary M. Poling (D-40th District)
- Berkeley County
  - Craig P. Blair (R-52nd District)
  - Victor A. Roberts (R-53rd District)
  - Walter E. Duke (R-54th District)
  - John Overington (R-55th District)
- Boone County
  - Larry W. Barker (D-18th District)
- Braxton County
  - Brent Boggs (D-34th District)
- Brooke County
  - Timothy R. Ennis (D-2nd District)
  - Jack Yost (D-2nd District)
- Cabell County
  - Kevin J. Craig (D-15th District)
  - Margarette Leach (D-15th District)
  - Jim Morgan (D-15th District)
  - Greg Howard (R-16th District)
  - Kelli Sobonya (R-16th District)
  - Dale Stephens (D-16th District)
  - Richard Thompson (D-17th District)
- Calhoun County
  - William Stemple (D-33rd District)
- Clay County
  - none
- Doddridge County
  - none
- Fayette County
  - Tom Louisos (D-29th District)
  - David G. Perry (D-29th District)
  - John Pino (D-29th District)
- Gilmer County
  - none
- Grant County
  - Allen Evans (R-48th District)
- Greenbrier County
  - Thomas W. Campbell (D-28th District)
  - Ray Canterbury (R-28th District)
- Hampshire County
  - Ruth Rowan (R-50th District)
- Hancock County
  - Joe DeLong (D-1st District)
  - Randy Swartzmiller (D-1st District)
- Hardy County
  - Harold Michael (D-47th District)
- Harrison County
  - Samuel J. Cann, Sr. (D-41st District)
  - Ron Fragale (D-41st District)
  - Richard J. Iaquinta (D-41st District)
  - Tim Miley (D-41st District)
- Jackson County
  - Mitch Carmichael (R-12th District)
- Jefferson County
  - Robert C. Tabb (D-56th District)
  - John Doyle (D-57th District)
  - Locke Wysong (D-58th District)
- Kanawha County
  - John Amores (D-30th District)
  - Bonnie Brown (D-30th District)
  - Barbara Hatfield (D-30th District)
  - Mark Hunt (D-30th District)
  - Corey L. Palumbo (D-30th District)
  - Sharon Spencer (D-30th District)
  - Danny Wells (D-30th District)
  - Carrie Webster (D-31st District)
  - Tim Armstead (R-32nd District)
  - Patrick Lane (R-32nd District)
  - Ron Walters (R-32nd District)
- Lewis County
  - Douglas K. Stalnaker (D-38th District)
- Lincoln County
  - none
- Logan County
  - Greg Butcher (D-19th District)
  - Jeff Eldridge (D-19th District)
  - Joe C. Ferrell (D-19th District)
  - Lidella Wilson Hrutkay (D-19th District)
- Marion County
  - Mike Caputo (D-43rd District)
  - Linda Longstreth (D-43rd District)
  - Tim Manchin (D-43rd District)
- Marshall County
  - Kenneth Tucker (D-4th District)
  - Scott Varner (D-4th District)
- Mason County
  - none
- Mercer County
  - Eustace Frederick (D-24th District)
  - Marshall Long (D-25th District)
  - Thomas Mike Porter (R-25th District)
- Mineral County
  - Robert A. Schadler (R-49th District)
- Mingo County
  - K. Steven Kominar (D-20th District)
  - Harry Keith White (D-21st District)
- Monongalia County
  - Robert D. Beach (D-44th District)
  - Cindy Frich (R-44th District)
  - Nancy Houston (D-44th District)
  - Charlene Marshall (D-44th District)
- Monroe County
  - Gerald L. Crosier (D-26th District)
- Morgan County
  - Charles S. Trump, IV (R-51st District)
- McDowell County
  - Cliff Moore (D-23rd District)
- Nicholas County
  - Sam Argento (D-35th District)
- Ohio County
  - Christopher Wakim (R-3rd District)
  - L. Gil White (R-3rd District)
- Pendleton County
  - none
- Pleasants County
  - Otis A. Leggett (R-7th District)
- Pocahontas County
  - none
- Preston County
  - Larry A. Williams (D-45th District)
- Putnam County
  - Dale Martin (D-13th District)
  - Brady Paxton (D-13th District)
  - Mike Hall (R-14th District)
  - Patti Eagloski Schoen (R-14th District)
- Raleigh County
  - Robert S. Kiss (D-27th District)
  - Linda Sumner (D-27th District)
  - Sally Susman (D-27th District)
- Randolph County
  - William G. Hartman (D-37th District)
  - Bill Proudfoot (D-37th District)
- Ritchie County
  - none
- Roane County
  - Bob Ashley (R-11th District)
- Summers County
  - Virginia Mahan (D-27th District)
- Taylor County
  - Jeffery Tansill (R-42nd District)
- Tucker County
  - Debbie Stevens (R-46th District)
- Tyler County
  - Roger Romine (R-6th District)
- Upshur County
  - Bill Hamilton (R-39th District)
- Wayne County
  - Don Perdue (D-17th District)
- Webster County
  - Joe Talbott (D-36th District)
- Wetzel County
  - Dave Pethtel (D-5th District)
- Wirt County
  - none
- Wood County
  - E. William Anderson (R-8th District)
  - Larry Border (R-9th District)
  - Tom Azinger (R-10th District)
  - J.D. Beane (D-10th District)
  - John N. Ellem (R-10th District)
- Wyoming County
  - Richard Browning (D-22nd District)
  - W. Richard Staton (D-22nd District)

== See also ==
- West Virginia House of Delegates
- List of members of the 78th West Virginia House of Delegates
