= 2014 West Virginia House of Delegates election =

- November 4, 2014

All 100 seats in the West Virginia House of Delegates 51 seats needed for a majority
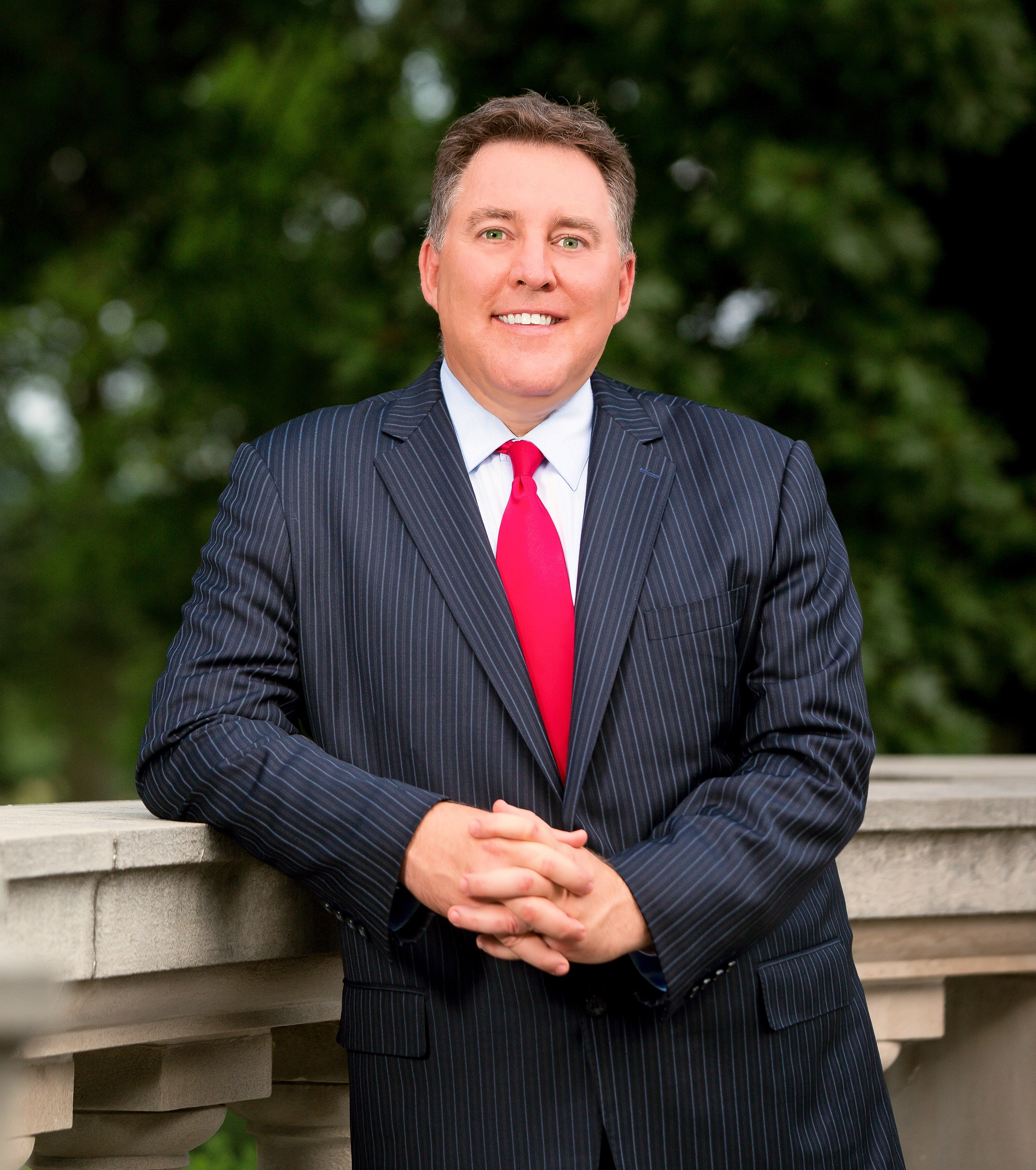
| | Majority party | Minority party |
|---|---|---|
| Leader | Tim Armstead | Tim Miley |
| Party | Republican | Democratic |
| Leader since | January 12, 2011 | January 9, 2013 |
| Leader's seat | 40th district | 48th district |
| Seats before | 46 | 54 |
| Seats won | 64 | 36 |
| Seat change | ▲18 | ▼18 |
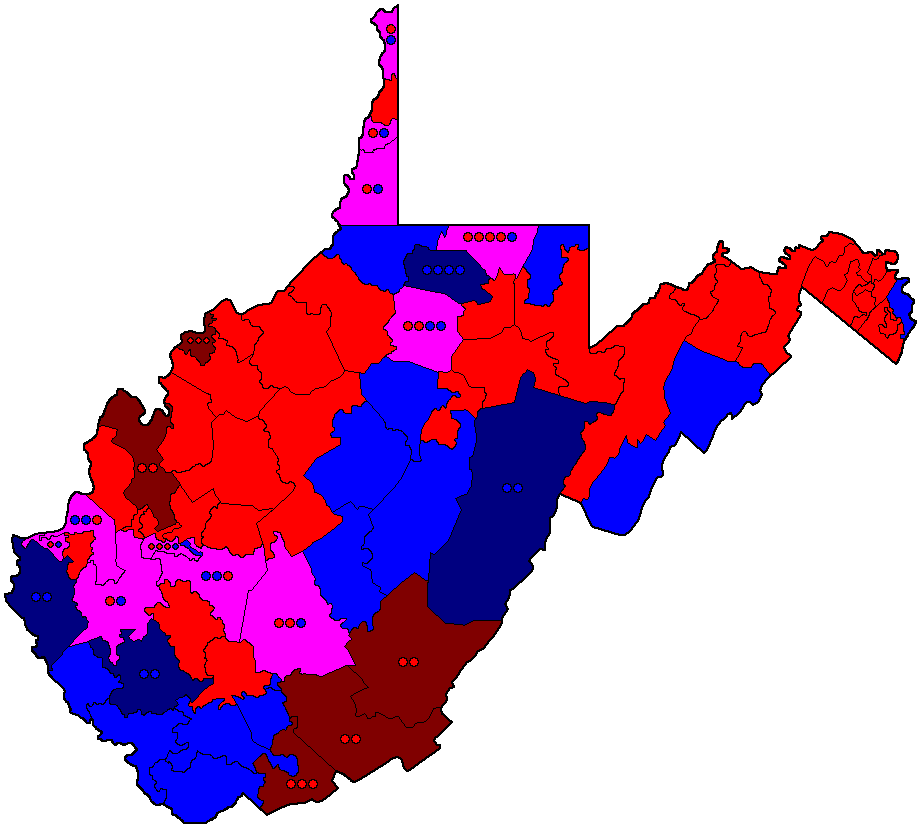
- ‘’‘District colors:’’’ Democratic (1+) Republican (1+) Democratic (1) Republican (1) Split delegation
Speaker before election
Tim Miley
Democratic
Elected Speaker
Tim Armstead
Republican

Elections to the West Virginia House of Delegates took place on November 4, 2014. All 100 seats in the chamber were up for election. The election occurred during a period of significant political realignment in West Virginia, with a notable number of incumbents retiring or seeking other offices, resulting in many open-seat contests across the state and increased competitiveness in several districts. Republican made substantial gains across both rural and traditionally Democratic-leaning regions, flipping multiple districts and benefiting from broader statewide political trends favoring the party. In total, Republicans gained 18 seats, securing a 64–36 majority and taking control of the chamber for the first time in 83 years.

== Incumbents retiring ==
Eight incumbents did not run for re-election in 2014. Those incumbents were:

| Name | Party | District |
|---|---|---|
| Ryan Ferns | Republican | District 3 |
| John Ellem | Republican | District 10 |
| Tom Azinger | Republican | District 10 |
| Troy Andes | Republican | District 15 |
| Kevin Craig | Democratic | District 16 |
| Doug Skaff | Democratic | District 35 |
| Meshea Poore | Democratic | District 37 |
| Mary Poling | Democratic | District 47 |

== Elected members ==
| District | Incumbent | Elected representatives |
|---|---|---|
| District 1 (2 seats) | Ronnie Jones (Democratic) Randy Swartzmiller (Democratic) | Pat McGeehan (Republican) Mark Zatezalo (Republican) |
| District 2 | Phil Diserio (Democratic) | Ryan Weld (Republican) |
| District 3 (2 seats) | Erikka Lynn Storch (Republican) Shawn Fluharty (Democratic) | Erikka Lynn Storch (Republican) Shawn Fluharty (Democratic) |
| District 4 (2 seats) | David Evans (Republican) Michael Ferro (Democratic) | David Evans (Republican) Michael Ferro (Democratic) |
| District 5 | Dave Pethtel (Democratic) | Dave Pethtel (Democratic) |
| District 6 | William Romine (Republican) | William Romine (Republican) |
| District 7 | Lynwood Ireland (Republican) | Lynwood Ireland (Republican) |
| District 8 | Bill Anderson (Republican) | Bill Anderson (Republican) |
| District 9 | Anna Border (Republican) | Anna Border (Republican) |
| District 10 (3 seats) | John Ellem (Republican) Tom Azinger (Republican) Daniel Poling (Democratic) | Mike Azinger (Republican) John R. Kelly (Republican) Frank Deem (Republican) |
| District 11 | Bob Ashley (Republican) | Bob Ashley (Republican) |
| District 12 | Steve Westfall (Republican) | Steve Westfall (Republican) |
| District 13 (2 seats) | Scott Cadle (Republican) Brady Paxton (Democratic) | Scott Cadle (Republican) Michael Ihle (Republican) |
| District 14 | Jim Butler (Republican) | Jim Butler (Republican) |
| District 15 | Troy Andes (Republican) | Geoff Foster (Republican) |
| District 16 (3 seats) | Kevin Craig (Democratic) Carol Miller (Republican) Jim Morgan (American politician) (Republican) | Sean Hornbuckle (Democratic) Carol Miller (Republican) Chuck Romine (Republican) |
| District 17 (2 seats) | Doug Reynolds (Democratic) Dale Stephens (Democratic) | Matthew Rohrbach (Republican) Dale Stephens (Democratic) |
| District 18 | Kelli Sobonya (Republican) | Kelli Sobonya (Republican) |
| District 19 (2 seats) | Timothy Kinsey (Democratic) Don Perdue (Democratic) | Timothy Kinsey (Democratic) Don Perdue (Democratic) |
| District 20 | Justin Marcum (Democratic) | Justin Marcum (Democratic) |
| District 21 | Harry White (Democratic) | Harry White (Democratic) |
| District 22 (2 seats) | Joshua Barker (Democratic) Jeff Eldridge (Democratic) | Michel Moffatt (Republican) Jeff Eldridge (Democratic) |
| District 23 | Joshua Nelson (Republican) | Joshua Nelson (Republican) |
| District 24 (2 seats) | Ralph Rodighiero (Democratic) Rupie Phillips (Democratic) | Ralph Rodighiero (Democratic) Rupie Phillips (Democratic) |
| District 25 | Linda Phillips (Democratic) | Linda Phillips (Democratic) |
| District 26 | Clif Moore (Democratic) | Clif Moore (Democratic) |
| District 27 (3 seats) | Joe Ellington (Republican) John Shott (Republican) Marty Gearheart (Republican) | Joe Ellington (Republican) John Shott (Republican) Marty Gearheart (Republican) |
| District 28 (2 seats) | Roy Cooper (Republican) John O'Neal (Republican) | Roy Cooper (Republican) John O'Neal (Republican) |
| District 29 | Rick Moye (Democratic) | Rick Moye (Democratic) |
| District 30 | Mick Bates (Democratic) | Mick Bates (Democratic) |
| District 31 | Lynne Arvon (Republican) | Lynne Arvon (Republican) |
| District 32 (3 seats) | David Perry (Democratic) John Pino (Democratic) Margaret Anne Staggers (Democratic) | Tom Fast (Republican) Kayla Kessinger (Republican) David Perry (Democratic) |
| District 33 | David Walker (Democratic) | Roger Hanshaw (Republican) |
| District 34 | Brent Boggs (Democratic) | Brent Boggs (Democratic) |
| District 35 (4 seats) | Doug Skaff (Democratic) Eric Nelson (Republican) JB McCuskey (Republican) Suzette Raines (Republican) | JB McCuskey (Republican) Eric Nelson (Republican) Andrew Byrd (Democratic) Chris Stansbury (Republican) |
| District 36 (3 seats) | Nancy Guthrie (Democratic) Mark Hunt (Democratic) Danny Wells (Democratic) | Nancy Guthrie (Democratic) Larry Rowe (Democratic) Brad White (Republican) |
| District 37 | Meshea Poore (Democratic) | Mike Pushkin (Democratic) |
| District 38 | Patrick Lane (Republican) | Patrick Lane (Republican) |
| District 39 | Ronald Walters (Republican) | Ronald Walters (Republican) |
| District 40 | Tim Armstead (Republican) | Tim Armstead (Republican) |
| District 41 | Adam Young (Democratic) | Jordan Hill (Republican) |
| District 42 (2 seats) | George Ambler (Republican) Ray Canterbury (Republican) | George Ambler (Republican) Ray Canterbury (Republican) |
| District 43 (2 seats) | William G. Hartman (Democratic) Denise Campbell (Democratic) | William G. Hartman (Democratic) Denise Campbell (Democratic) |
| District 44 | Dana Lynch (Democratic) | Dana Lynch (Democratic) |
| District 45 | Bill Hamilton (Republican) | Bill Hamilton (Republican) |
| District 46 | Margaret Smith (Republican) | Margaret Smith (Republican) |
| District 47 | Mary Poling (Democratic) | Danny Wagner (Republican) |
| District 48 (4 seats) | Danny Hamrick (Republican) Ron Fragale (Democratic) Richard Iaquinta (Democratic) Timothy Miley (Democratic) | Danny Hamrick (Republican) Patsy Trecost (Democratic) Terry Waxman (Republican) Timothy Miley (Democratic) |
| District 49 | Mike Manypenny (Democratic) | Amy Summers (Republican) |
| District 50 (3 seats) | Mike Caputo (Democratic) Linda Longstreth (Democratic) Tim Manchin (Democratic) | Mike Caputo (Democratic) Linda Longstreth (Democratic) Tim Manchin (Democratic) |
| District 51 (5 seats) | Barbara Fleischauer (Democratic) Charlene Marshall (Democratic) Anthony Barill (Democratic) Cindy Frich (Republican) Amanda Pasdon (Republican) | Barbara Fleischauer (Democratic) Brian Kurcaba (Republican) Amanda Pasdon (Republican) Cindy Frich (Republican) Joe Statler (Republican) |
| District 52 | Larry Williams (Democratic) | Larry Williams (Democratic) |
| District 53 | Randy Smith (Republican) | Randy Smith (Republican) |
| District 54 | Allen Evans (Republican) | Allen Evans (Republican) |
| District 55 | Isaac Sponaugle (Democratic) | Isaac Sponaugle (Democratic) |
| District 56 | Gary Howell (Republican) | Gary Howell (Republican) |
| District 57 | Ruth Rowan (Republican) | Ruth Rowan (Republican) |
| District 58 | Daryl Cowles (Republican) | Daryl Cowles (Republican) |
| District 59 | Larry Kump (Republican) | Saira Blair (Republican) |
| District 60 | Larry V. Faircloth (Republican) | Larry V. Faircloth (Republican) |
| District 61 | Jason Barrett (Democratic) | Walter Duke (Republican) |
| District 62 | John Overington (Republican) | John Overington (Republican) |
| District 63 | Michael Folk (Republican) | Michael Folk (Republican) |
| District 64 | Eric Householder (Republican) | Eric Householder (Republican) |
| District 65 | Tiffany Lawrence (Democratic) | Jill Upson (Republican) |
| District 66 | Paul Espinosa (Republican) | Paul Espinosa (Republican) |
| District 67 | Stephen Skinner (Democratic) | Stephen Skinner (Democratic) |
