= List of members of the 79th West Virginia House of Delegates =

This list of members of the 79th West Virginia House of Delegates lists the presumed members of the House of Delegates for the 79th West Virginia Legislature.

== House of Delegates Leadership ==
Position	Name	Party	District	County
Speaker of the House	Richard Thompson	Democratic	17	Wayne Co.
Speaker pro tempore	Ron Fragale	Democratic	41	Harrison Co.
Majority Leader	Brent Boggs	Democratic	34	Braxton Co.
Minority Leader	Tim Armstead	Republican	32	Kanawha Co.
Majority Whip	Mike Caputo	Democratic	43	Marion Co.
Minority Whip	Larry Border	Republican	9	Wood Co.

== List of Members in the House of Delegates by District ==
District	Representative	Party	County(ies)
1	Pat McGeehan	Republican	Hancock
1	Randy Swartzmiller	Democratic	Hancock
2	Timothy Ennis	Democratic	Brooke, Ohio (part)
2	Roy E. Givens	Democratic	Brooke, Ohio (part)
3	Tal Hutchins	Democratic	Ohio (part)
3	Orphy Klempa	Democratic	Ohio (part)
4	Michael T. Ferro	Democratic	Marshall
4	Scott Varner	Democratic	Marshall
5	Dave Pethtel	Democratic	Monongalia (part), Wetzel
6	Wm. Roger Romine	Republican	Doddridge, Tyler
7	Lynwood "Woody" Ireland	Republican	Pleasants, Ritchie
8	Bill Anderson	Republican	Wood (part)
9	Larry Border	Republican	Wirt, Wood (part)
10	Tom Azinger	Republican	Wood (part)
10	John N. Ellem	Democratic	Wood (part)
10	Daniel Poling	Democratic	Wood (part)
11	Bob Ashley	Republican	Jackson (part), Roane
12	Mitch B. Carmichael	Republican	Jackson (part)
13	Dale Martin	Democratic	Jackson (part), Mason (part), Putnam
13	Brady Paxton	Democratic	Jackson (part), Mason (part), Putnam
14	Troy Andes	Republican	Mason (part), Putnam (part)
14	Patti Eagloski Schoen	Republican	Mason (part), Putnam (part)
15	Kevin Craig	Democratic	Cabell (part), Lincoln (part)
15	Carol Miller	Republican	Cabell (part), Lincoln (part)
15	Jim Morgan	Democratic	Cabell (part), Lincoln (part)
16	Doug Reynolds	Republican	Cabell (part)
16	Kelli Sobonya	Republican	Cabell (part)
16	Dale Stephens	Democratic	Cabell (part)
17	Richard Thompson	Democratic	Wayne (part)
17	Don Perdue	Democratic	Wayne (part)
18	Larry Barker	Democratic	Boone (part)
19	Greg Butcher	Democratic	Boone (part), Lincoln (part), Logan (part), Putnam (part)
19	Jeff Eldridge	Democratic	Boone (part), Lincoln (part), Logan (part), Putnam (part)
19	Ralph Rodighiero	Democratic	Boone (part), Lincoln (part), Logan (part), Putnam (part)
19	Josh Stowers	Democratic	Boone (part), Lincoln (part), Logan (part), Putnam (part)
20	K. Steven Kominar	Democratic	Mingo (part), Wayne (part)
21	Harry Keith White	Democratic	McDowell (part), Mingo (part)
22	Daniel J. Hall	Democratic	McDowell (part), Mercer (part), Wyoming
22	Linda Goode Phillips	Democratic	McDowell (part), Mercer (part), Wyoming
23	Clif Moore	Democratic	McDowell (part)
24	Bill Cole	Republican	Mercer (part)
25	John R. Frazier	Democratic	Mercer (part)
25	T. Mike Porter Jr.	Republican	Mercer (part)
26	Gerald Crosier	Democratic	Monroe, Summers (part)
27	Virginia Mahan	Democratic	Raleigh, Summers (part)
27	Rick Moye	Democratic	Raleigh, Summers (part)
27	Linda Sumner	Republican	Raleigh, Summers (part)
27	Sally Susman	Democratic	Raleigh, Summers (part)
27	William R. "Bill" Wooten	Democratic	Raleigh, Summers (part)
28	Thomas W. Campbell	Democratic	Greenbrier
28	Ray Canterbury	Republican	Greenbrier
29	Tom Louisos	Democratic	Clay (part), Fayette, Nicholas (part)
29	David Perry	Democratic	Clay (part), Fayette, Nicholas (part)
29	Margaret Anne Staggers	Democratic	Clay (part), Fayette, Nicholas (part)
30	Bonnie Brown	Democratic	Kanawha (part)
30	Nancy Peoples Guthrie	Democratic	Kanawha (part)
30	Barbara Hatfield	Democratic	Kanawha (part)
30	Mark Hunt	Democratic	Kanawha (part)
30	Doug Skaff Jr.	Democratic	Kanawha (part)
30	Sharon Spencer	Democratic	Kanawha (part)
30	Danny Wells	Democratic	Kanawha (part)
31	Meshea Poore	Democratic	Kanawha (part)
32	Tim Armstead	Republican	Kanawha (part)
32	Patrick Lane	Republican	Kanawha (part)
32	Ron Walters	Republican	Kanawha (part)
33	David Walker	Democratic	Calhoun, Clay (part), Gilmer (part)
34	Brent Boggs	Democratic	Braxton, Gilmer (part)
35	Sam J. Argento	Democratic	Nicholas (part)
36	Joseph Talbott	Democratic	Nicholas (part), Webster
37	Bill Hartman	Democratic	Pocahontas, Randolph
37	Mike Ross	Democratic	Pocahontas, Randolph
38	Peggy Donaldson Smith	Democratic	Lewis, Upshur (part)
39	Bill Hamilton	Republican	Upshur (part)
40	Mary M. Poling	Democratic	Barbour, Upshur (part)
41	Sam Cann	Democratic	Harrison, Marion (part)
41	Ron Fragale	Democratic	Harrison, Marion (part)
41	Richard J. Iaquinta	Democratic	Harrison, Marion (part)
41	Tim Miley	Democratic	Harrison, Marion (part)
42	Mike Manypenny	Democratic	Marion (part), Monongalia (part), Taylor
43	Mike Caputo	Republican	Marion (part), Monongalia (part)
43	Linda Longstreth	Republican	Marion (part), Monongalia (part)
43	Tim Manchin	Democratic	Marion (part), Monongalia (part)
44	Robert "Bob" Beach	Democratic	Monongalia (part)
44	Barbara Evans Fleischauer	Democratic	Monongalia (part)
44	Charlene Marshall	Democratic	Monongalia (part)
44	Alex J. Shook	Democratic	Monongalia (part)
45	Larry A. Williams	Democratic	Preston (part)
46	Stan Shaver	Democratic	Preston (part), Tucker
47	Harold Michael	Democratic	Hardy, Pendleton (part)
48	Allen R. Evans	Republican	Grant, Mineral (part), Pendleton (part)
49	Robert A. Schadler	Republican	Mineral (part)
50	Ruth Rowan	Republican	Hampshire (part), Mineral (part)
51	Daryl E. Cowles	Republican	Hampshire (part), Morgan (part)
52	Craig P. Blair	Republican	Berkeley (part), Morgan (part)
53	Jonathan Miller	Republican	Berkeley (part)
54	Walter E. Duke	Republican	Berkeley (part)
55	John Overington	Republican	Berkeley (part)
56	Terry L. Walker	Democratic	Berkeley (part), Jefferson (part)
57	John Doyle	Democratic	Jefferson (part)
58	Tiffany Lawrence	Democratic	Jefferson (part)

== Composition ==
2009–2011:

Affiliation	Members
Democratic Party	71
Republican Party	29
Total	100
Majority	42

== See also ==
- West Virginia House of Delegates
- List of members of the 78th West Virginia House of Delegates
- List of speakers of the West Virginia House of Delegates
