= List of members of the 78th West Virginia House of Delegates =

This list of members of the 78th West Virginia House of Delegates lists the members of the House of Delegates for the 78th West Virginia Legislature.

== House of Delegates Leadership ==
Position	Name	Party	District	County
Speaker of the House	Richard Thompson	Democratic	17	Wayne Co.
Speaker pro tempore	Ron Fragale	Democratic	41	Harrison Co.
Majority Leader	Joe DeLong	Democratic	1	Hancock Co.
Minority Leader	Tim Armstead	Republican	32	Kanawha Co.
Majority Vice leader	Mike Caputo	Democratic	43	Marion Co.
Minority leader	Larry Border	Republican	9	Wood Co.

== List of Members in the House of Delegates by District ==
District	Representative	Party	County(ies)
1	Joe DeLong	Democratic	Hancock
1	Randy Swartzmiller	Democratic	Hancock
2	Timothy Ennis	Democratic	Brooke, Ohio (part)
2	Jack Yost	Democratic	Brooke, Ohio (part)
3	Tal Hutchins	Democratic	Ohio (part)
3	Orphy Klempa	Democratic	Ohio (part)
4	Kenneth Tucker	Democratic	Marshall
4	Scott Varner	Democratic	Marshall
5	Dave Pethtel	Democratic	Monongalia (part), Wetzel
6	William Romine	Republican	Doddridge, Tyler
7	Lynwood "Woody" Ireland	Republican	Pleasants, Ritchie
8	William Anderson	Republican	Wood (part)
9	Larry Border	Republican	Wirt, Wood (part)
10	Tom Azinger	Republican	Wood (part)
10	John N. Ellem	Democratic	Wood (part)
10	Daniel Poling	Democratic	Wood (part)
11	Bob Ashley	Republican	Jackson (part), Roane
12	Mitch Carmichael	Republican	Jackson (part)
13	Dale Martin	Democratic	Jackson (part), Mason (part), Putnam
13	Brady Paxton	Democratic	Jackson (part), Mason (part), Putnam
14	Troy Andes	Republican	Mason (part), Putnam (part)
14	Patti Eagloski Schoen	Republican	Mason (part), Putnam (part)
15	Kevin J. Craig	Democratic	Cabell (part), Lincoln (part)
15	Carol Miller	Republican	Cabell (part), Lincoln (part)
15	Jim Morgan	Democratic	Cabell (part), Lincoln (part)
16	Doug Reynolds	Republican	Cabell (part)
16	Kelli Sobonya	Republican	Cabell (part)
16	Dale Stephens	Democratic	Cabell (part)
17	Richard Thompson	Democratic	Wayne (part)
17	Don Perdue	Democratic	Wayne (part)
18	Larry W. Barker	Democratic	Boone (part)
19	Jeff Eldridge	Democratic	Boone (part), Lincoln (part), Logan, Putnam (part)
19	Ted Ellis	Democratic	Boone (part), Lincoln (part), Logan, Putnam (part)
19	Lidella Wilson Hrutkay	Democratic	Boone (part), Lincoln (part), Logan, Putnam (part)
19	Ralph Rodighiero	Democratic	Boone (part), Lincoln (part), Logan, Putnam (part)
20	K. Steven Kominar	Democratic	Mingo (part), Wayne (part)
21	Harry Keith White	Democratic	McDowell (part), Mingo (part)
22	Richard Browning	Democratic	McDowell (part), Mercer (part), Wyoming
22	Mike Burdiss	Democratic	McDowell (part), Mercer (part), Wyoming
23	Clif Moore	Democratic	McDowell (part)
24	Eustace Frederick	Democratic	Mercer (part)
25	Marshall Long	Democratic	Mercer (part)
25	Thomas Mike Porter	Republican	Mercer (part)
26	Gerald L. Crosier	Democratic	Monroe, Summers (part)
27	Louis Gall	Democratic	Raleigh, Summers (part)
27	Melvin Kessler	Democratic	Raleigh, Summers (part)
27	Virginia Mahan	Democratic	Raleigh, Summers (part)
27	Ricky Moye	Democratic	Raleigh, Summers (part)
27	Linda Sumner	Republican	Raleigh, Summers (part)
28	Thomas W. Campbell	Democratic	Greenbrier
28	Ray Canterbury	Republican	Greenbrier
29	David G. Perry	Democratic	Clay (part), Fayette, Nicholas (part)
29	John Pino	Democratic	Clay (part), Fayette, Nicholas (part)
29	Margaret Anne Staggers	Democratic	Clay (part), Fayette, Nicholas (part)
30	Bonnie Brown	Democratic	Kanawha (part)
30	Nancy Peoples Guthrie	Democratic	Kanawha (part)
30	Barbara Hatfield	Democratic	Kanawha (part)
30	Dave Higgins	Democratic	Kanawha (part)
30	Corey L. Palumbo	Democratic	Kanawha (part)
30	Sharon Spencer	Democratic	Kanawha (part)
30	Danny Wells	Democratic	Kanawha (part)
31	Carrie Webster	Democratic	Kanawha (part)
32	Tim Armstead	Republican	Kanawha (part)
32	Patrick Lane	Republican	Kanawha (part)
32	Ron Walters	Republican	Kanawha (part)
33	William Stemple	Democratic	Calhoun, Clay (part), Gilmer (part)
34	Brent Boggs	Democratic	Braxton, Gilmer (part)
35	Sam J. Argento	Democratic	Nicholas (part)
36	Joe Talbott	Democratic	Nicholas (part), Webster
37	William G. Hartman	Democratic	Pocahontas, Randolph
37	Bill Proudfoot	Democratic	Pocahontas, Randolph
38	Douglas K. Stalnaker	Democratic	Lewis, Upshur (part)
39	Bill Hamilton	Republican	Upshur (part)
40	Mary M. Poling	Democratic	Barbour, Upshur (part)
41	Sam Cann	Democratic	Harrison, Marion (part)
41	Ron Fragale	Democratic	Harrison, Marion (part)
41	Richard Iaquinta	Democratic	Harrison, Marion (part)
41	Tim Miley	Democratic	Harrison, Marion (part)
42	Jeffery L. Tansill	Republican	Marion (part), Monongalia (part), Taylor
43	Mike Caputo	Republican	Marion (part), Monongalia (part)
43	Linda Longstreth	Republican	Marion (part), Monongalia (part)
43	Tim Manchin	Democratic	Marion (part), Monongalia (part)
44	Robert D. Beach	Democratic	Monongalia (part)
44	Barbara Evans Fleischauer	Democratic	Monongalia (part)
44	Charlene Marshall	Democratic	Monongalia (part)
44	Alex J. Shook	Democratic	Monongalia (part)
45	Larry A. Williams	Democratic	Preston (part)
46	Stan Shaver	Democratic	Preston (part), Tucker
47	Harold Michael	Democratic	Hardy, Pendleton (part)
48	Allen R. Evans	Republican	Grant, Mineral (part), Pendleton (part)
49	Robert A. Schadler	Republican	Mineral (part)
50	Ruth Rowan	Republican	Hampshire (part), Mineral (part)
51	Daryl Cowles	Republican	Hampshire (part), Morgan (part)
52	Craig P. Blair	Republican	Berkeley (part), Morgan (part)
53	Jonathan Miller	Republican	Berkeley (part)
54	Walter E. Duke	Republican	Berkeley (part)
55	John Overington	Republican	Berkeley (part)
56	Robert C. Tabb	Democratic	Berkeley (part), Jefferson (part)
57	John Doyle	Democratic	Jefferson (part)
58	Locke Wysong	Democratic	Jefferson (part)

== Composition ==
2007–2009:

Affiliation	Members
Democratic Party	72
Republican Party	28
Total	100
Majority	44

== See also ==
- West Virginia House of Delegates
- List of members of the 77th West Virginia House of Delegates
- List of members of the 79th West Virginia House of Delegates
- List of speakers of the West Virginia House of Delegates
