= Michael Angelucci =

American politician (1982–2025)

Member of the West Virginia House of Delegates from the 50th district
- In office December 2018 – December 2020 Serving with Mike Caputo and Linda Longstreth
- Preceded by: Guy Ward
- Succeeded by: Joey Garcia; Guy Ward; Phil Mallow

Personal details
- Born: February 17, 1982
- Died: January 20, 2025 (aged 42)
- Party: Democratic

Michael J. Angelucci II (February 17, 1982 – January 20, 2025) was an American politician from the state of West Virginia. He served as a Democratic member of the West Virginia House of Delegates.

== Life and career ==
He was born on February 17, 1982, the son of Michael and Dana Beveridge Angelucci, and was raised in Farmington, West Virginia. He attended Pierpont Community and Technical College, becoming a certified emergency medical technician and paramedic. He would then work for the Marion County Rescue Squad for 24 years, including 15 as its administrator. He was elected to the West Virginia House of Delegates in 2018, but lost re-election in 2020. Angelucci died on January 20, 2025, at the age of 42. Governor Patrick Morrisey ordered flags to be flown at half-staff on January 27, 2025, in his honor.

== Electoral history ==
=== 2018 ===
==== Primary election ====
West Virginia House of Delegates, District 50, 2018 primary election * denotes incumbent Source:
Party	Candidate	Votes	%
Democratic	Mike Caputo *	4,752	28.2
Democratic	Linda Longstreth *	4,152	24.6
Democratic	Michael Angelucci	3,540	21.0
Democratic	Jack L. Oliver	1,929	11.4
Democratic	John "Mike" Criado	1,410	8.4
Democratic	George "Frank" Jarman	1,080	6.4
Total votes		16,863	100

==== General election ====
West Virginia House of Delegates, District 50, 2018 general election * denotes incumbent Source:
Party	Candidate	Votes	%
Democratic	Mike Caputo *	10,224	21.6
Democratic	Linda Longstreth *	9,314	19.7
Democratic	Michael Angelucci	8,588	18.1
Republican	Guy Ward *	8,516	18.0
Republican	Phil Mallow	7,480	15.8
Independent	Jon Dodds	3,267	6.9
Total votes		47,389	100

=== 2020 ===
==== Primary election ====
West Virginia House of Delegates, District 50, 2020 primary election * denotes incumbent Source:
Party	Candidate	Votes	%
Democratic	Michael Angelucci *	4,545	21.1
Democratic	Joey Garcia	4,202	19.6
Democratic	Ronald J. Straight	2,945	13.7
Democratic	Stephanie Tomana	2,677	12.5
Democratic	C. A. "Cody" Starcher	2,206	10.3
Democratic	Jon Dodds	1,673	7.8
Democratic	Aryanna Islam	1,327	6.2
Democratic	Andrew Mills	996	4.6
Democratic	Jarryd Powell	924	4.3
Total votes		21,495	100

==== General election ====
West Virginia House of Delegates, District 50, 2020 general election * denotes incumbent Source:
Party	Candidate	Votes	%
Republican	Guy Ward	11,334	18.2
Republican	Phil Mallow	11,178	18.0
Democratic	Joey Garcia	10,917	17.6
Democratic	Michael Angelucci *	10,852	17.5
Democratic	Ronald J. Straight	9,400	15.1
Republican	Darton McIntire	8,477	13.6
Total votes		62,158	100
