= Joey Garcia =

American politician (born 1983)

Member of the West Virginia Senate from the 13th district
- Incumbent
- Assumed office December 1, 2024 Serving with Mike Oliverio
- Preceded by: Mike Caputo

Member of the West Virginia House of Delegates
- In office December 1, 2020 – December 1, 2024
- Preceded by: Michael Angelucci; Mike Caputo; Linda Longstreth
- Succeeded by: Rick Garcia
- Constituency: 50th district (2020–2022); 76th district (2022–2024)

Personal details
- Born: January 30, 1983 (age 43) Marietta, Ohio, U.S.
- Party: Democratic
- Spouse: Heather Hoelscher
- Education: West Virginia University (BA, JD)
- Website: State Senate website; Campaign website

Joey Garcia (born January 30, 1983) is an American attorney and politician, serving as a member of the West Virginia Senate from the 13th district since 2024. He previously represented the 50th district in the West Virginia House of Delegates from 2020 to 2024.

== Early life and education ==
Garcia was born in Marietta, Ohio, and raised in Fairmont, West Virginia. After graduating from Fairmont Senior High School, he earned a Bachelor of Arts degree in history from West Virginia University, and a Juris Doctor from the West Virginia University College of Law.

== Career ==
Garcia formerly worked as a personal injury attorney at the Manchin Law Group, a firm founded by Tim Manchin. He previously served as senior counsel for legislation and policy, and the director of legislative affairs for Governor Jim Justice. Garcia was elected to the West Virginia House of Delegates in November 2020 and assumed office on December 1, 2020. He served as vice minority chair of the House Technology & Infrastructure Committee, as well as the House Workforce Development Committee.

In November 2024 Garcia was the sole Democrat elected to the West Virginia Senate, becoming one of only two in the chamber.
