= 1988 United States presidential election in West Virginia =

- November 8, 1988
- Turnout: 67.4% (of registered voters) ▼46.7% (of voting age population) ▼

| Nominee | Michael Dukakis | George H. W. Bush |
| Party | Democratic | Republican |
| Home state | Massachusetts | Texas |
| Running mate | Lloyd Bentsen | Dan Quayle |
| Electoral vote | 5 (Note: A faithless Democratic elector, Margarette Leach, voted for Bentsen for president and Dukakis for vice president.) | 0 |
| Popular vote | 341,016 | 310,065 |
| Percentage | 52.20% | 47.46% |

Dukakis
50–60%
60–70%
70–80%
Bush
50–60%
60–70%
70–80%
President before election
Ronald Reagan
Republican
Elected President
George H. W. Bush
Republican

The 1988 United States presidential election in West Virginia took place on November 8, 1988. All 50 states and the District of Columbia were part of the 1988 United States presidential election. West Virginia voters chose six electors to the Electoral College, which selected the president and vice president.

West Virginia was won by Massachusetts Governor Michael Dukakis who was running against incumbent United States Vice President George H. W. Bush of Texas. Dukakis ran with Texas Senator Lloyd Bentsen as Vice President, and Bush ran with Indiana Senator Dan Quayle.

Dukakis won the election in West Virginia with a 5-point margin. West Virginia weighed in for this election as 13 percentage points more Democratic than the national average. West Virginia would go on to vote for the winning candidate from 1992 to 2004. Since 2008, West Virginia has been considered a safe red state, when it backed a Republican who lost both the electoral college and popular vote. As of 2024, this is the last time a Republican won the presidency without winning West Virginia, and that West Virginia backed a Democrat who lost the presidential election.

The 1988 election cycle was the last time that West Virginia did not vote for the same presidential candidate as neighboring Kentucky. The presidential election of 1988 was a very partisan election for West Virginia, with over 99% of the electorate voting for either the Republican or Democratic parties, and only three candidates appearing on the ballot.

West Virginia was home to a faithless elector in the election of 1988. During the assembly of the electoral college, one elector from West Virginia, Margarette Leach, cast her vote for the Democratic vice presidential nominee Lloyd Bentsen as president, and Dukakis as the vice president. She did this in order to draw attention to the lack of accountability for electors under the Electoral College system.

== Results ==
1988 United States presidential election in West Virginia
| Party | Candidate | Votes | Percentage | Electoral votes |
|---|---|---|---|---|
| Democratic | Michael Dukakis | 341,016 | 52.20% | 5 |
| Republican | George H. W. Bush | 310,065 | 47.46% | 0 |
| New Alliance Party | Lenora Fulani | 2,230 | 0.34% | 0 |
| Democratic | Lloyd Bentsen | 0 | 0.00% | 1 |
| Totals | | 653,311 | 100.00% | 6 |

=== Results by county ===
| County | Michael Dukakis Democratic | | George H. W. Bush Republican | | Lenora Fulani New Alliance | | Margin | | Total votes cast |
| County | # | % | # | % | # | % | # | % | Total votes cast |
|---|---|---|---|---|---|---|---|---|---|
| Barbour | 3,221 | 51.45% | 3,023 | 48.28% | 17 | 0.27% | 198 | 3.17% | 6,261 |
| Berkeley | 6,313 | 36.84% | 10,761 | 62.80% | 61 | 0.36% | -4,448 | -25.96% | 17,135 |
| Boone | 6,539 | 69.97% | 2,786 | 29.81% | 20 | 0.21% | 3,753 | 40.16% | 9,345 |
| Braxton | 3,377 | 62.27% | 2,024 | 37.32% | 22 | 0.41% | 1,353 | 24.95% | 5,423 |
| Brooke | 6,258 | 60.72% | 4,006 | 38.87% | 42 | 0.41% | 2,252 | 21.85% | 10,306 |
| Cabell | 15,368 | 47.05% | 17,197 | 52.65% | 97 | 0.30% | -1,829 | -5.60% | 32,662 |
| Calhoun | 1,644 | 53.78% | 1,395 | 45.63% | 18 | 0.59% | 249 | 8.15% | 3,057 |
| Clay | 2,263 | 59.38% | 1,536 | 40.30% | 12 | 0.31% | 727 | 19.08% | 3,811 |
| Doddridge | 955 | 33.54% | 1,880 | 66.03% | 12 | 0.42% | -925 | -32.49% | 2,847 |
| Fayette | 11,009 | 67.94% | 5,143 | 31.74% | 53 | 0.33% | 5,866 | 36.20% | 16,205 |
| Gilmer | 1,661 | 54.21% | 1,387 | 45.27% | 16 | 0.52% | 274 | 8.94% | 3,064 |
| Grant | 893 | 21.62% | 3,215 | 77.85% | 22 | 0.53% | -2,322 | -56.23% | 4,130 |
| Greenbrier | 6,091 | 52.87% | 5,395 | 46.83% | 35 | 0.30% | 696 | 6.04% | 11,521 |
| Hampshire | 2,085 | 38.88% | 3,253 | 60.66% | 25 | 0.47% | -1,168 | -21.78% | 5,363 |
| Hancock | 8,338 | 58.39% | 5,882 | 41.19% | 60 | 0.42% | 2,456 | 17.20% | 14,280 |
| Hardy | 1,689 | 39.39% | 2,581 | 60.19% | 18 | 0.42% | -892 | -20.80% | 4,288 |
| Harrison | 17,005 | 55.90% | 13,364 | 43.93% | 49 | 0.16% | 3,641 | 11.97% | 30,418 |
| Jackson | 4,573 | 44.44% | 5,696 | 55.35% | 22 | 0.21% | -1,123 | -10.91% | 10,291 |
| Jefferson | 4,334 | 44.56% | 5,349 | 55.00% | 43 | 0.44% | -1,015 | -10.44% | 9,726 |
| Kanawha | 41,144 | 51.73% | 38,140 | 47.95% | 258 | 0.32% | 3,004 | 3.78% | 79,542 |
| Lewis | 3,272 | 47.37% | 3,602 | 52.14% | 34 | 0.49% | -330 | -4.77% | 6,908 |
| Lincoln | 5,049 | 59.20% | 3,457 | 40.53% | 23 | 0.27% | 1,592 | 18.67% | 8,529 |
| Logan | 11,317 | 72.51% | 4,244 | 27.19% | 47 | 0.30% | 7,073 | 45.32% | 15,608 |
| Marion | 14,441 | 60.82% | 9,229 | 38.87% | 72 | 0.30% | 5,212 | 21.95% | 23,742 |
| Marshall | 7,903 | 53.47% | 6,793 | 45.96% | 83 | 0.56% | 1,110 | 7.51% | 14,779 |
| Mason | 5,468 | 50.51% | 5,332 | 49.26% | 25 | 0.23% | 136 | 1.25% | 10,825 |
| McDowell | 7,204 | 74.16% | 2,463 | 25.36% | 47 | 0.48% | 4,741 | 48.80% | 9,714 |
| Mercer | 10,152 | 49.69% | 10,221 | 50.03% | 57 | 0.28% | -69 | -0.34% | 20,430 |
| Mineral | 4,059 | 40.14% | 6,015 | 59.49% | 37 | 0.37% | -1,956 | -19.35% | 10,111 |
| Mingo | 7,429 | 71.78% | 2,896 | 27.98% | 25 | 0.24% | 4,533 | 43.80% | 10,350 |
| Monongalia | 14,178 | 53.83% | 12,091 | 45.91% | 69 | 0.26% | 2,087 | 7.92% | 26,338 |
| Monroe | 2,427 | 46.96% | 2,719 | 52.61% | 22 | 0.43% | -292 | -5.65% | 5,168 |
| Morgan | 1,545 | 33.85% | 3,002 | 65.78% | 17 | 0.37% | -1,457 | -31.93% | 4,564 |
| Nicholas | 5,173 | 57.89% | 3,731 | 41.75% | 32 | 0.36% | 1,442 | 16.14% | 8,936 |
| Ohio | 10,121 | 49.18% | 10,341 | 50.25% | 116 | 0.56% | -220 | -1.07% | 20,578 |
| Pendleton | 1,595 | 45.53% | 1,901 | 54.27% | 7 | 0.20% | -306 | -8.74% | 3,503 |
| Pleasants | 1,421 | 44.59% | 1,761 | 55.26% | 5 | 0.16% | -340 | -10.67% | 3,187 |
| Pocahontas | 1,958 | 50.83% | 1,876 | 48.70% | 18 | 0.47% | 82 | 2.13% | 3,852 |
| Preston | 4,357 | 42.73% | 5,804 | 56.92% | 35 | 0.34% | -1,447 | -14.19% | 10,196 |
| Putnam | 6,640 | 44.74% | 8,163 | 55.00% | 38 | 0.26% | -1,523 | -10.26% | 14,841 |
| Raleigh | 14,302 | 57.71% | 10,395 | 41.95% | 85 | 0.34% | 3,907 | 15.76% | 24,782 |
| Randolph | 5,233 | 52.24% | 4,746 | 47.38% | 38 | 0.38% | 487 | 4.86% | 10,017 |
| Ritchie | 1,446 | 33.33% | 2,874 | 66.25% | 18 | 0.41% | -1,428 | -32.92% | 4,338 |
| Roane | 2,447 | 45.89% | 2,861 | 53.66% | 24 | 0.45% | -414 | -7.77% | 5,332 |
| Summers | 3,072 | 57.81% | 2,231 | 41.98% | 11 | 0.21% | 841 | 15.83% | 5,314 |
| Taylor | 2,852 | 50.09% | 2,816 | 49.46% | 26 | 0.46% | 36 | 0.63% | 5,694 |
| Tucker | 1,869 | 52.25% | 1,699 | 47.50% | 9 | 0.25% | 170 | 4.75% | 3,577 |
| Tyler | 1,501 | 38.75% | 2,365 | 61.05% | 8 | 0.21% | -864 | -22.30% | 3,874 |
| Upshur | 3,065 | 38.83% | 4,813 | 60.97% | 16 | 0.20% | -1,748 | -22.14% | 7,894 |
| Wayne | 8,621 | 54.65% | 7,123 | 45.15% | 31 | 0.20% | 1,498 | 9.50% | 15,775 |
| Webster | 2,185 | 67.92% | 1,016 | 31.58% | 16 | 0.50% | 1,169 | 36.34% | 3,217 |
| Wetzel | 3,928 | 53.44% | 3,381 | 46.00% | 41 | 0.56% | 547 | 7.44% | 7,350 |
| Wirt | 929 | 44.97% | 1,125 | 54.45% | 12 | 0.58% | -196 | -9.48% | 2,066 |
| Wood | 12,959 | 39.80% | 19,450 | 59.73% | 154 | 0.47% | -6,491 | -19.93% | 32,563 |
| Wyoming | 6,138 | 63.38% | 3,516 | 36.31% | 30 | 0.31% | 2,622 | 27.07% | 9,684 |
| Totals | 341,016 | 52.20% | 310,065 | 47.46% | 2,230 | 0.34% | 30,951 | 4.74% | 653,311 |

==== Counties that flipped from Republican to Democratic ====
- Barbour
- Calhoun
- Gilmer
- Greenbrier
- Harrison
- Kanawha
- Marshall
- Mason
- Monongalia
- Nicholas
- Pocahontas
- Raleigh
- Randolph
- Summers
- Taylor
- Tucker
- Wayne
- Wetzel

== See also ==
- Presidency of George H. W. Bush
