= John Mandt =

American politician

Member of the West Virginia House of Delegates from the 16th district
- In office December 1, 2020 – December 16, 2022 Serving with Sean Hornbuckle & Daniel Linville
- In office December 1, 2018 – October 3, 2020
- Preceded by: Carol Miller

Personal details
- Born: John Franklin Mandt Jr. May 8, 1963 (age 63) Huntington, West Virginia, U.S.
- Party: Republican
- Spouse: Ami McGinnis
- Children: 6
- Education: Marshall University (Did not graduate)

John Franklin Mandt Jr. (born May 8, 1963) is an American businessman, politician, who formerly served as a Republican member of the West Virginia House of Delegates, representing District 16, which includes parts of Cabell and Lincoln counties. First elected in 2018, he resigned after it was reported he made homophobic remarks in a private Facebook chat. Mandt previously referred to the LGBT community as "the alphabet hate group" and called Delegate Eric Porterfield "a great guy" in response to his own anti-gay comments. Mandt was elected to fill the vacant seat left by Nancy Cartmill on the Cabell County Commission in the 2022 General Election, beating Democrat Bob Bailey.

== Political career ==
=== Election results ===
2018 Republican primary, House of Delegates, District 16
Party	Candidate	Votes	%
Republican	John Mandt	1,329	22.50%
Republican	Daniel Linville	1,135	19.21%
Republican	Vera Miller	843	14.27%
Republican	Jarred Cannon	832	14.08%
Republican	Steve Davis	726	12.29%
Republican	Chris Burger	677	11.46%
Republican	Andrew Dornbos	365	6.18%

2018 general election, House of Delegates, District 16
Party	Candidate	Votes	%
Democratic	Sean Hornbuckle	7,644	20.73%
Republican	John Mandt	6,523	17.69%
Republican	Daniel Linville	6,332	17.17%
Democratic	Matt Spurlock	6,081	16.49%
Republican	Vera Miller	5,619	15.24%
Democratic	Dakota Nelson	4,669	12.66%

2020 Republican primary, House of Delegates, District 16
Party	Candidate	Votes	%
Republican	Daniel Linville	2,404	31.41%
Republican	John Mandt	2,262	29.55%
Republican	Mark Bates	2,011	26.27%
Republican	Jakob Jitima	977	12.76%
