= Romine =

Romine is a surname. Notable people with the surname include:

- Al Romine (1930–2015), American football player
- Andrew Romine (born 1985), American baseball player
- Austin Romine (born 1988), American baseball player
- Chuck Romine (1936–2023), American politician
- Gary Romine, American politician
- Kevin Romine (born 1961), American baseball player
- William Romine (born 1944), American politician
