= Jerry Mezzatesta =

American politician

Member of the West Virginia House of Delegates
- In office December 1, 1986 – December 1, 2004
- Preceded by: Daniel Shanholtz
- Succeeded by: Ruth Rowan
- Constituency: 50th district (1992–2004); 36th district (1986–1992)

Personal details
- Born: December 1, 1946 (age 79) Ravenna, Ohio, U.S.
- Party: Democratic
- Spouse: Mary Lou Clark
- Children: 3
- Education: Shepherd University (B.S.); Frostburg State University (M.Ed); West Virginia University; Marshall University
- Occupation: Educator, Tree farmer

Jerry Mezzatesta is an American Democratic Party politician, who has represented the U.S. state of West Virginia. He was the West Virginia House of Delegates member from the 50th District which represents Mineral County and Hampshire County in West Virginia's Eastern Panhandle. The Charleston Gazette called him "one of West Virginia's most powerful politicians".

In 2004, Mezzatesta and his wife, Mary Lou, pleaded no contest to a misdemeanor charge that they altered and destroyed legislative computer records. Mezzatesta lost his re-election bid that same year to Ruth Rowan. In April 2005, he was fired from his $60,000-a-year job with the Hampshire County Board of Education.

In 2005, the West Virginia Ethics Commission found that Mezzatesta had violated an agreement to not use his legislative position to solicit funds for the county's school system. They subsequently fined him $2000. In September 2006, a federal grand jury indicted him and former Hampshire County Schools Superintendent David Friend on two counts of fraud and misappropriation of funds. However, on March 30, 2007, Mezzatesta and Friend were acquitted. On April 23, 2009, Judge C. Reeves Taylor ruled that Mezzatesta should get his job back in the Hampshire County school system. Clearing him of the alleged ethics violations, Judge Taylor wrote that "from the record there was no agreement between the Ethics Commission and Mezzatesta at the time held the position (as a school board employee), merely a request made by him to the commission and an advisory opinion made by (the Ethics Commission) and conveyed to (Mezzatesta)." The school board paid Mezzatesta a $192,000 settlement in lieu of rehiring him.

Preceded by Daniel Shanholtz	West Virginia House of Delegates 50th District; 1986-2004	Succeeded by Ruth Rowan
