= Ruth Rowan =

American politician (born 1948)

Member of the West Virginia House of Delegates
- In office December 1, 2004 – December 1, 2022
- Preceded by: Jerry Mezzatesta
- Succeeded by: New boundaries
- Constituency: 57th district (2012–2022); 50th district (2004–2012)

Personal details
- Born: September 12, 1948 (age 78)
- Party: Republican
- Spouse: Thomas Treton Rowan
- Children: Julie Ann Rowan-Wolford; Thomas Llewellyn Rowan
- Education: California University of Pennsylvania; West Virginia University
- Occupation: Educator

Ruth Rowan (born September 12, 1948) is an American politician from the U.S. state of West Virginia. She is a member of the Republican Party and served as a member the West Virginia House of Delegates from the 57th District, which represented parts of Mineral County and Hampshire County in West Virginia's Eastern Panhandle. In 2004, she defeated the embattled House Delegate Jerry Mezzatesta for his seat after he was embroiled in a political scandal in 2003-04.

== Personal life ==
Rowan was born in Pennsylvania. She was received her B.S. and M. Ed. from California University of Pennsylvania. She is a long-serving and now retired elementary school teacher in Hampshire County Schools. She married Tom Rowan and they had two children, Julie and Tom. The granddaughter of a coal miner, Rowan is one of few West Virginia Republicans endorsed by the United Mine Workers of America. She has been endorsed by the American Federation of Teachers, the National Education Association, the AFL-CIO, West Virginians for Life, and the National Rifle Association. A descendant of Frontier Ranger Doctor Llewellyn, her earliest forebears blazed a trail in the wilderness near the Forks of Cheat River in present-day Monongalia County, West Virginia.

== Career ==
The West Virginia House of Delegates had often been reminded of West Virginia's most senior county by Rowan, who began each floor presentation with the phrase "from West Virginia's oldest county". She championed infrastructure, senior, veteran, children, education and healthcare issues. She was appointed to represent West Virginia in the United States' Southern Regional Education Conference to help shape emerging issues in education.

Rowan enjoyed broad based bipartisan support in both Charleston and her home district, as demonstrated by her strong showing in both primary and general elections. In the general election of 2010, Rowan garnered 72% of the vote, despite the endorsement of a well-funded challenger by several popular state and local elected officials.

== See also ==
- List of members of the 78th West Virginia House of Delegates
- List of members of the 79th West Virginia House of Delegates
- List of members of the 80th West Virginia House of Delegates

Political offices
Preceded by	West Virginia House of Delegates 57th District; 2012–2022	Succeeded by incumbent
Preceded by Jerry Mezzatesta	West Virginia House of Delegates 50th District; 2004–2012	Succeeded by
