= Jim Morgan (American politician) =

American politician

Member of the Cabell County Commission
- In office January 12, 2017 – December 15, 2022
- Preceded by: Anne Yon
- Succeeded by: Liza Caldwell

Member of the West Virginia House of Delegates from the 16th district
- In office January 12, 2013 – January 12, 2017
- Succeeded by: C.E. Romine

Member of the West Virginia House of Delegates from the 15th district
- In office February 2001 – January 2013
- Preceded by: Arley Johnson

Member of the West Virginia House of Delegates from the 15th district
- In office January 1989 – January 1991

Personal details
- Born: December 5, 1937 (age 88) Huntington, West Virginia, U.S.
- Party: Democratic
- Education: West Virginia University

James Hanly Morgan (born December 5, 1937) is an American politician and a former Democratic member of the Cabell County Commission. Morgan served consecutively from his February 2001 appointment to fill the vacancy caused by the resignation of Representative Arley Johnson until January 2013, and from that point until January 2017 for District 16 and non-consecutively from January 1989 until January 1991 in a District 15 seat. In 2016 instead of running for another term in House of Delegates, Morgan ran for an open seat as a Cabell County Commissioner. He assumed the office of County Commissioner on January 12, 2017. He lost his bid for re-election in the 2022 General Election to Republican Liza Caldwell.

== Education ==
Morgan earned his BS degree from West Virginia University.

== Elections ==
- 2012 With all three incumbent District 15 representatives redistricted to District 16, Morgan placed second in the May 8, 2012, Democratic Primary with 2,850 votes (35.6%), and placed third in the five-way three-position November 6, 2012, General election with 8,050 votes (20.8%) behind Democratic Representative Kevin Craig and Republican Carol Miller and ahead of non-selectees Sean Hornbuckle (D) and Mike Davis (R).
- 1988 Morgan was initially elected to District 15 in the 1988 Democratic Primary and the November 3, 1988, General election.
- 2002 Morgan and incumbent Representatives Craig and Margarette Leach were unopposed for the 2002 Democratic Primary and were re-elected in the five-way three-position November 5, 2002, General election.
- 2004 Morgan and incumbent Representatives Craig and Leach were unopposed for the 2004 Democratic Primary, and were re-elected in the six-way three-position November 2, 2004, General election.
- 2006 Morgan and incumbent Representatives Craig and Leach were challenged in the five-way 2006 Democratic Primary but all placed; Morgan and Craig were re-elected in the six-way three-position November 7, 2006, General election alongside Republican nominee Carol Miller, unseating Representative Leach.
- 2008 Morgan placed first in the three-way May 13, 2008, Democratic Primary with 5,321 votes (37.9%), and placed second in the six-way three-position November 4, 2008, General election with 9,397 votes (20.9%) behind incumbent Craig (D) and ahead of incumbent Miller (R), and non-selectees Carl Eastham (D), James Carden (R), and Paula Stewart (R).
- 2010 Morgan and Representative Craig were challenged in the five-way May 11, 2010, Democratic Primary where Morgan placed second with 2,461 votes (26.1%), and placed third in the six-way three-position November 2, 2010, General election with 6,188 votes (18.5%) behind Representatives Craig (D) and Miller (R) and ahead of non-selectees Matthew Woelfel (D), Patrick Lucas (R), and Douglas Franklin (R).
