= Anna Border =

American politician

Member of the West Virginia House of Delegates from the 9th district
- In office June 21, 2011 – December 1, 2016
- Preceded by: Larry Border

Personal details
- Born: December 22, 1952 (age 73)
- Party: Republican
- Education: Parkersburg Community College; West Virginia University

Anna Border Sheppard (born December 22, 1952) is an American politician who was a Republican member of the West Virginia House of Delegates representing District 9 from June 21, 2011, to December 1, 2016. She was appointed by West Virginia Governor Earl Ray Tomblin to fill the vacancy caused by the death of her husband, Representative Larry Border.

== Education ==
Border attended Parkersburg Community College (now the West Virginia University at Parkersburg), and earned her BS from West Virginia University.

== Elections ==
- 2012 Border was unopposed for the May 8, 2012, Republican Primary, winning with 1,468 votes, and won the November 6, 2012, General election with 4,504 votes (65.6%) against Democratic perennial candidate Jim Marion, who has run for the seat since 2002, and in 1998 as an Independent.
- On March 9, 2015, Border announced that she would be seeking the Republican nomination for President of the United States in the 2016 election.
