= Joe DeLong =

American politician

Member of the West Virginia House of Delegates from the 1st district
- In office 2000–2008
- Succeeded by: Pat McGeehan

Personal details
- Born: December 14, 1972 (age 53) Weirton, West Virginia
- Party: Democratic
- Education: West Virginia University
- Occupation: Businessman

Joe DeLong is an American politician who served as a Democratic member of the West Virginia House of Delegates, representing the 1st District from 2000 to 2008. He held the position of Majority Leader of the House of Delegates from 2006 to 2008. In 2008 he decided to forgo re-election to the House and ran an unsuccessful primary campaign for West Virginia Secretary of State. He was succeeded in the House by Republican Pat McGeehan. Joe DeLong is the son of Teresa (Manypenny) DeLong and Robert Delong, of New Cumberland, WV.
