= Sean Hornbuckle =

American politician (born 1985)

Minority Leader of the West Virginia House of Delegates
- Incumbent
- Assumed office August 8, 2023
- Preceded by: Doug Skaff

Member of the West Virginia House of Delegates
- Incumbent
- Assumed office December 1, 2014
- Preceded by: Kevin Craig
- Constituency: 16th district (2014–2022); 25th district (2022–present)

Personal details
- Born: September 2, 1985 (age 40) Huntington, West Virginia, U.S.
- Party: Democratic
- Children: 1
- Education: Marshall University (BA, MBA)
- Occupation: Elected official Financial advisor

Sean Hornbuckle (born September 2, 1985) is an American politician who has served in the West Virginia House of Delegates from the 25th district since 2014. In 2023, Hornbuckle was elected Minority Leader of the House of Delegates. He is the first black floor leader in West Virginia history.

== Early life and education ==
Hornbuckle was born and raised in Huntington, West Virginia. He attended Huntington High School, where he played basketball and football and was a member of the National Honor Society. He graduated in 2003.

He attended Marshall University, where received a bachelor of arts in sports management and marketing in 2007, and a master's in business administration in 2010. At Marshall, he was elected student body president in 2009, and named "Mr. Marshall." In addition, he was a member of the Society of Black Scholars.

== Career ==
After graduating from Marshall, Hornbuckle served on the faculty of Mountwest Community and Technical College from 2011 to 2013.

Since 2013, he has coached AAU and YMCA youth basketball teams.

In 2014, he was first elected to the West Virginia House of Delegates.

Since 2015, he has worked as a financial advisor with Edward Jones.

From 2017 to 2019, he served as co-interim director of the Fairfield Community Development Corporation.

In 2023, Hornbuckle was elected Minority Leader of the House of Delegates after his predecessor, Doug Skaff, stepped down from the post.

== Community ==
Hornbuckle serves on the board of directors for civic and community organizations, including Huntington Prep and Yeager Scholars, and the Planning Commission for the City of Huntington. He is a member of NAACP's Huntington chapter.

== Personal life ==
Hornbuckle lives in Huntington, West Virginia, where he has one child. Hornbuckle is a Christian.

West Virginia House of Delegates
Preceded by Doug Skaff	Minority Leader of the West Virginia House of Delegates; 2023–present	Incumbent
