= Kevin Craig =

American politician

Kevin J. Craig

Member of the West Virginia House of Delegates
- In office December 1, 2000 – December 1, 2014
- Preceded by: Chuck Romine
- Succeeded by: Sean Hornbuckle
- Constituency: 16th district (2012–2014); 15th district (2000–2012)

Personal details
- Born: July 28, 1968 (age 58) Pittsburgh, Pennsylvania, U.S.
- Party: Democratic
- Children: Rebecca Craig, John Craig
- Education: University of Notre Dame; Georgia Southern University

Military service
- Branch/service: United States Army
- Years of service: 1991–1996
- Rank: Captain

Kevin Joseph Craig (born July 28, 1968) is an American politician and a former Democratic member of the West Virginia House of Delegates who represented District 13 from 2012 to 2014. Craig served from 2000 until 2012 in the District 15 seat.

== Education ==
Craig earned his BBA from the University of Notre Dame and his MBA from Georgia Southern University.

== Elections ==
- 2012 With all three incumbent District 15 representatives redistricted to District 16, Craig placed first in the May 8, 2012 Democratic Primary with 2,978 votes (37.2%), and placed first in the five-way three-position November 6, 2012 General election with 8,866 votes (22.9%) ahead of incumbent Republican Carol Miller and Jim Morgan and non-selectees Sean Hornbuckle (D) and Mike Davis (R).
- 2000 To challenge District 15 incumbent Republican Representative Chuck Romine, Craig placed in the five-way 2000 Democratic Primary and was elected in the six-way three-position November 7, 2000 General election alongside Democratic incumbents Arley Johnson and Margarette Leach.
- 2002 Craig and incumbent Representatives Leach and Morgan were unopposed for the 2002 Democratic Primary and were re-elected in the five-way three-position November 5, 2002 General election.
- 2004 Craig and incumbent Representatives Leach and Morgan were unopposed for the 2004 Democratic Primary, and were re-elected in the six-way three-position November 2, 2004 General election.
- 2006 Craig and incumbent Representatives Leach and Morgan were challenged in the five-way 2006 Democratic Primary but all placed; Morgan and Craig were re-elected in the six-way three-position November 7, 2006 General election alongside Republican nominee Carol Miller, unseating Representative Leach.
- 2008 Craig placed second in the three-way May 13, 2008 Democratic Primary with 5,179 votes (36.9%), and placed first in the six-way three-position November 4, 2008 General election with 10,522 votes (23.4%) and ahead of incumbents Morgan (D) and Miller (R), and non-selectees Carl Eastham (D), James Carden (R), and Paula Stewart (R).
- 2010 Craig and Representative Morgan were challenged in the five-way May 11, 2010 Democratic Primary where Craig placed first with 2,800 votes (29.7%), and placed first in the six-way three-position November 2, 2010 General election with 6,886 votes (20.6%) ahead of Representatives Miller (R) and Morgan (D) and non-selectees Matthew Woelfel (D), Patrick Lucas (R), and Douglas Franklin (R).
