= Scott Varner =

American politician

Majority Whip of the West Virginia House of Delegates
- In office 1997–2007
- Succeeded by: Mike Caputo

Member of the West Virginia House of Representatives from the 4th district
- In office 1993–2013
- Succeeded by: David Evans

Personal details
- Born: July 1, 1962 (age 64) Wheeling, West Virginia
- Party: Democratic Party
- Spouse: Suzanne Yanni
- Children: 2
- Education: West Virginia University
- Profession: Teacher

Scott Varner is an American politician who served as a member of the West Virginia House of Delegates from the 4th district. Scott served as majority whip of the West Virginia House from 1997 to 2007. In 2025, he was appointed as the president of the Marshall County Commission after 11 years as a county commissioner. He is a member of the Democratic Party.

== Career ==
He is, as of 2015, the Director of Career, Technical and Adult Education for Marshall County Schools.

== Speakership candidacy ==
In 2006, Scott announced his candidacy for speaker getting support from chairmans of four major committees. He was in a race against Democrat Rick Thompson. There were concerns of someone like Varner from the north of the state neglecting the interests of people in the southern part of the state. The Democratic Party caucus decided to make Thompson speaker.
