= Joseph Talbott =

American politician (1933–2014)

Member of the West Virginia House of Delegates from the 36th district
- In office 2002–2012
- In office 1992–1996

Personal details
- Born: Joseph Blair Talbott; January 23, 1933 Webster Springs, West Virginia, US
- Died: January 5, 2014 (aged 80)
- Party: Democratic
- Education: West Virginia Wesleyan College
- Alma mater: Potomac State College of West Virginia University

Joseph Blair Talbott (January 23, 1933 – January 5, 2014) was an American politician. A Democrat, he was a member of the West Virginia House of Delegates, representing Webster County and part of Nicholas County.

== Biography ==
Talbott was born pn January 23, 1933, in Webster Springs, West Virginia. He was the grandson of W. T. Talbott, who was elected to the House of Delegates in 1897. He attended Webster County public schools before graduating from Potomac State College and West Virginia Wesleyan College. Besides politics, he was an educator and a United States Marine Corps veteran. He died on January 5, 2014, aged 80.
