= Greg Butcher =

American politician (1952–2023)

Member of the West Virginia House of Delegates from the 19th district
- In office 2008–2012
- In office 1996–2004

Personal details
- Born: May 11, 1952 Logan, West Virginia, U.S.
- Died: October 9, 2023 (aged 71) Alum Creek, West Virginia, U.S.
- Party: Democratic

Gregory (Greg) Allen Butcher (May 11, 1952 – October 9, 2023) was an American politician from West Virginia. He was a Democrat and represented District 19 in the West Virginia House of Delegates.
