= Larry Border =

American politician

Larry Border (June 3, 1951 – June 8, 2011) was an American Republican politician from West Virginia.

Border served in the West Virginia House of Delegates from 1990 until his death; he was the minority chairman of the House Health and Human Resources Committee, and served on the Finance, House Rules, and Agriculture committees as well. He had also served as minority whip during his time in the legislature. A pharmacist by trade, Border was a resident of Davisville; he died after suffering a massive stroke. His wife, Anna Border, took his place in the House of Delegates after his death.
