= Larry Williams (politician) =

American politician

Member of the West Virginia House of Delegates from the 52nd district
- In office January 12, 2013 – April 15, 2015
- Preceded by: Larry Kump

Member of the West Virginia House of Delegates from the 45th district
- In office October 8, 1993 – January 2013
- Preceded by: David Miller
- Succeeded by: Bill Hamilton

Personal details
- Born: November 17, 1943 (age 82) Grafton, West Virginia, U.S.
- Party: Democratic

Military service
- Branch/service: United States Army
- Years of service: 1961–1964

Larry Allen Williams (born November 17, 1943) is an American politician who was a Democratic member of the West Virginia House of Delegates representing District 52 from January 12, 2013 to April 15, 2015. Williams served consecutively in the District 45 seat from his appointment on October 8, 1993, filling the vacancy caused by the resignation of Representative David Miller, until January 2013.

== Education ==
Williams graduated from Tunnelton High School in 1961.

== Elections ==
- Early 1990s - Initially appointed to District 45, Williams was elected in the 1994 Democratic Primary and the November 8, 1994, General election, and re-elected in the November 5, 1996, General election.
- 1998 - Williams was unopposed for the 1998 Democratic Primary and won the November 3, 1998, General election against Republican nominee Steve Bevins.
- 2000 - Williams was unopposed for both the 2000 Democratic Primary and the November 7, 2000, General election.
- 2002 - Williams was unopposed for the 2002 Democratic Primary and won the November 5, 2002, General election against Republican nominee William Means.
- 2004 - Williams was unopposed for the 2004 Democratic Primary, and won the November 2, 2004, General election against Republican nominee David Batson.
- 2006 - Williams was unopposed for both the 2006 Democratic Primary and the November 7, 2006, General election.
- 2008 - Williams was unopposed for both the May 13, 2008, Democratic Primary, winning with 2,440 votes, and the November 4, 2008, General election, winning with 5,964 votes.
- 2010 - Williams was unopposed for both the May 11, 2010, Democratic Primary, winning with 1,700 votes, and the November 2, 2010, General election, winning with 4,758 votes.
- 2012 - Redistricted to District 52, and with incumbent Larry Kump redistricted to District 59, Williams was unopposed for the May 8, 2012, Democratic Primary, winning with 1,021 votes, and won the November 6, 2012, General election with 3,967 votes (80.4%) against Constitution Party candidate Rick Bartlett.
