= Gerald Crosier =

American politician (1933–2016)

Member of the West Virginia House of Delegates from the 26th district
- In office 2002–2012

Personal details
- Born: December 11, 1933 Union, West Virginia
- Died: April 23, 2016 (aged 82) Roanoke, Virginia
- Party: Democratic

Gerald "Jerry" L. Crosier (December 11, 1933 – April 23, 2016) was an American politician from West Virginia. He was a Democrat and represented District 26 in the West Virginia House of Delegates.
