= Brady Paxton =

American politician (1947–2024)

Member of the West Virginia House of Delegates from the 13th district
- In office April 22, 1999 – 2014
- Preceded by: Gary Tillis
- Succeeded by: Michael Ihle

Member of the West Virginia House of Delegates from the 29th district
- In office January 1993 – January 1995

Personal details
- Born: January 21, 1947 Bancroft, West Virginia, U.S.
- Died: December 25, 2024 (aged 77)
- Party: Democratic
- Education: West Virginia State College

Military service
- Branch/service: United States Army

Brady Ralph Paxton (January 21, 1947 – December 25, 2024) was an American politician who served as a Democratic member of the West Virginia House of Delegates. He first represented the 29th district from January 1993 until January 1995, then represented the 13th district from his April 22, 1999, appointment to fill the vacancy caused by the resignation of Representative Gary Tillis until his retirement in 2014.

== Background ==
Paxton was born in Bancroft, West Virginia, on January 21, 1947. He earned his BS from West Virginia State College (now West Virginia State University). Paxton died on December 25, 2024, at the age of 77.

== Elections ==
- 2012 Paxton and appointed Representative Helen Martin were unopposed for the May 8, 2012, Democratic Primary where Paxton placed first with 2,764 votes (57.0%). Paxton placed first in the four-way two-position November 6, 2012, General election with 6,663 votes (27.8%) ahead of Republican nominee Scott Cadle, returning 2008 and 2010 Republican nominee Brian Scott, and unseated Representative Martin.
- 1994 Paxton was initially elected in the 1994 Democratic Primary and the November 8, 1994, General election.
- 2000 Paxton placed in the three-way 2000 Democratic Primary and was elected in the four-way two-position November 7, 2000, General election alongside fellow Democratic nominee Dale Martin against Republican nominees Charlie Bonnett and Jack McLane.
- 2002 Paxton and Representative Martin were challenged in the three-way 2002 Democratic Primary and were re-elected in the three-way two-position November 5, 2002, General election against returning Republican 2000 opponent Jack McLane.
- 2004 Paxton and Representative Martin were challenged in the five-way 2004 Democratic Primary and were re-elected in the four-way two-position November 2, 2004, General election against Republican nominee Christopher Wood and returning 2000 and 2002 Republican opponent Jack McLane.
- 2006 Paxton and Representative Martin were challenged in the three-way 2006 Democratic Primary and were re-elected in the three-way two-position November 7, 2006, General election against Republican nominee Penny Dick.
- 2008 Paxton placed first in the three-way May 13, 2008, Democratic Primary with 3,886 votes (38.6%), and placed first in the four-way two-position November 4, 2008, General election with 8,369 votes (22.9%) ahead of incumbent Representative Martin (D) and Republican nominees James McCormick and Brian Scott.
- 2010 Paxton and Representative Martin were unopposed for the May 11, 2010, Democratic Primary where Paxton placed first with 1,995 votes (52.7%), and placed first in the three-way two-position November 2, 2010, General election with 6,175 votes (35.0%) ahead of incumbent Martin (D) and returning 2008 Republican challenger Brian Scott; Representative Martin died during the session and his wife was appointed to finish the term.
