= Linda Longstreth =

American politician

Member of the West Virginia House of Delegates from the 50th district
- In office January 12, 2013 – December 1, 2020
- Preceded by: Ruth Rowan

Member of the West Virginia House of Delegates from the 16th district
- In office January 2005 – January 2013
- Preceded by: Donna Renner

Personal details
- Born: Mannington, West Virginia, U.S.
- Party: Democratic
- Education: Fairmont State College; West Virginia University

Military service
- Branch/service: United States Army Reserve
- Rank: Staff Sergeant

Linda S. Longstreth is an American politician who was a Democratic member of the West Virginia House of Delegates representing District 50 from January 12, 2013, to December 1, 2020. Longstreth served consecutively from January 2005 until January 2013 in a District 43 seat.

== Education ==
Longstreth earned her BA from Fairmont State College (now Fairmont State University) and her MS from West Virginia University.

== Elections ==
- 2012 Redistricted to District 50 along with fellow District 43 Representatives Mike Caputo and Tim Manchin, Longstreth placed second in the four-way May 8, 2012 Democratic Primary with 6,171 votes (27.2%), and placed second in the five-way three-position November 6, 2012 General election with 12,117 votes (23.2%) behind Representative Caputo (D) and ahead of Representative Manchin (D) and Republican nominees Barry Bledsoe and returning 2010 challenger Lynette McQuain.
- 2004 Longstreth challenged District 43 incumbent Representatives Caputo, Manchin, and Donna Renner and placed in the nine-way 2004 Democratic Primary displacing Representative Renner, and was elected in the six-way three-position November 2, 2004 General election with incumbents Caputo (D) and Manchin (D).
- 2006 Longstreth and Representatives Caputo and Manchin were challenged in the five-way 2006 Democratic Primary, but all placed, and were re-elected in the six-way three-position November 7, 2006 General election.
- 2008 Longstreth and Representatives Caputo and Manchin were unopposed for the May 13, 2008 Democratic Primary where Longstreth placed second with 9,800 votes (32.6%); Longstreth placed second in the four-way three-position November 4, 2008 General election with 14,567 votes (26.9%) behind of Representative Caputo (D) and ahead of Representative Manchin (D) and returning 2006 Republican nominee Rickie Starn.
- 2010 Longstreth and Representatives Caputo and Manchin were unopposed for the May 11, 2010 Democratic Primary where Longstreth placed second with 5,670 votes (33.2%); and placed second in the five-way three-position November 2, 2010 General election with 10,597 votes (21.1%) behind Representative Caputo (D) and ahead of Representative Manchin (D) and Republican nominees Rickie Starn (returning from 2006 and 2008), Travis Blosser, and Lynette McQuain.
