= Margarette Leach =

American politician

Member of the West Virginia House of Delegates from the 15th district
- In office January 1993 – January 2007
- Succeeded by: Carol Miller

Personal details
- Born: December 4, 1926 Goodwill, West Virginia, U.S.
- Died: December 23, 2007 (aged 81) Huntington, West Virginia, U.S.
- Party: Democratic

Margarette Faye Riggins Leach (December 4, 1926 – December 23, 2007) was an American Democratic politician from West Virginia, best known for being a faithless elector during the 1988 United States presidential election.

She pledged to vote for Michael Dukakis for President of the United States and Lloyd Bentsen for Vice President of the United States. However, she cast her vote for Bentsen as president and Dukakis as vice president as a form of protest against the electoral college's winner-take-all system.

Leach was later a seven-term member of the West Virginia House of Delegates, representing the 15th district. She won the Democratic primary for an additional term, but lost the general election in 2006.

Leach died December 23, 2007.
