= Stan Shaver =

American politician (1948–2024)

Member of the West Virginia House of Delegates from the 46th district
- In office 2007 – December 1, 2012
- In office 2001–2005

Personal details
- Born: September 8, 1948 Grafton, West Virginia
- Died: January 12, 2024 (aged 75) Newburg, West Virginia
- Party: Democratic
- Education: Alderson-Broaddus College
- Alma mater: Troy State University

Stanley Earl Shaver (September 8, 1948 – January 12, 2024) was an American politician from West Virginia. He was a Democrat and represented District 46 in the West Virginia House of Delegates. Shaver was a history schoolteacher in West Virginia public schools. Shaver was defeated for re-election in the 2012 election.
