= Don Perdue =

American politician (1949–2025)

Member of the West Virginia House of Delegates from the 19th district
- In office January 12, 2013 – 2016

Member of the West Virginia House of Delegates from the 17th district
- In office January 2003 – January 2013
- Preceded by: Rick Thompson

Member of the West Virginia House of Delegates from the 18th district
- In office January 1999 – January 2003
- Succeeded by: Earnie Kuhn

Personal details
- Born: November 12, 1949 Kenova, West Virginia, U.S.
- Died: October 18, 2025 (aged 75)
- Party: Democratic
- Education: Marshall University; Ohio Northern University

Don Clayton Perdue (November 12, 1949 – October 18, 2025) was an American politician who was a Democratic member of the West Virginia House of Delegates representing District 19 from January 12, 2013, to 2016. Perdue served consecutively from January 1999 until January 2013 in the District 18 and District 17 seats.

Perdue died on October 18, 2025, at the age of 75.

== Education ==
Perdue earned his BS in chemistry from Marshall University and his BS in pharmacy from Ohio Northern University.

== Elections ==
- 2012 Redistricted to District 19 with fellow District 17 incumbent Rick Thompson, Perdue placed second in the May 8, 2012, Democratic primary with 3,088 votes (46.6%), and placed second in the three-way two-position November 6, 2012, General election with 6,817 votes (36.4%) behind incumbent Representative Thompson (D) and ahead of Republican nominee Randy Tomblin.
- 1994 Perdue initially ran unsuccessfully for the West Virginia House of Delegates in 1994.
- 1998 Perdue was initially elected in the open District 18 seat in the five-way 1998 Democratic primary and the November 3, 1998, General election.
- 2000 Perdue was unopposed for both the 2000 Democratic primary and the November 7, 2000, General election.
- 2002 Redistricted to District 17 alongside its previous sole incumbent Rick Thompson, Perdue and Thompson were challenged in the 2002 Democratic primary and were both re-elected in the three-way two-position November 5, 2002, General election.
- 2004 Perdue and Representative Thompson were unopposed for the 2004 Democratic primary, and were re-elected in the four-way two-position November 2, 2004, General election.
- 2006 Perdue and Representative Thompson were unopposed for the 2006 Democratic primary and were re-elected in the three-way two-position November 7, 2006, General election against Republican nominee Luiza Peana.
- 2008 Perdue and Representative Thompson and returning Republican challenger Luiza Peana were all unopposed for their May 13, 2008, primaries, setting up a rematch; Perdue placed second in the three-way two-position November 4, 2008, General election with 7,121 votes (35.9%) behind incumbent Thompson and ahead of Peana.
- 2010 Perdue and Representative Thompson were unopposed for both the May 11, 2010, Democratic primary where Perdue placed second with 2,664 votes (47.2%), and the November 2, 2010, General election where Perdue placed second with 5,909 votes (47.6%) behind Representative Thompson.
