= Chuck Romine =

American politician (1936–2023)

Charles Everett "C. E." Romine (January 16, 1936 – September 24, 2023) was an American politician. He was a member of the West Virginia House of Delegates from 1968 to 1974, 1998 to 2000, and 2016 to 2018. Romine died on September 24, 2023, at the age of 87.
