= Bonnie Brown (American politician) =

American politician (born 1942)

Member of the West Virginia House of Representatives from the 30th district
- In office 2001–2012
- In office 1990–1994
- In office 1982–1988

Personal details
- Born: October 5, 1942 (age 83)
- Party: Democratic
- Education: Morris Harvey College
- Alma mater: Oregon State University; University of Idaho

Bonnie Louise Brown (born October 5, 1942) is an American politician from West Virginia. She was a Democrat member of the West Virginia House of Delegates. Brown endorsed the Hillary Clinton 2008 presidential campaign. She was defeated at the 2012 election.
