= Ron Fragale =

American politician (1950–2024)

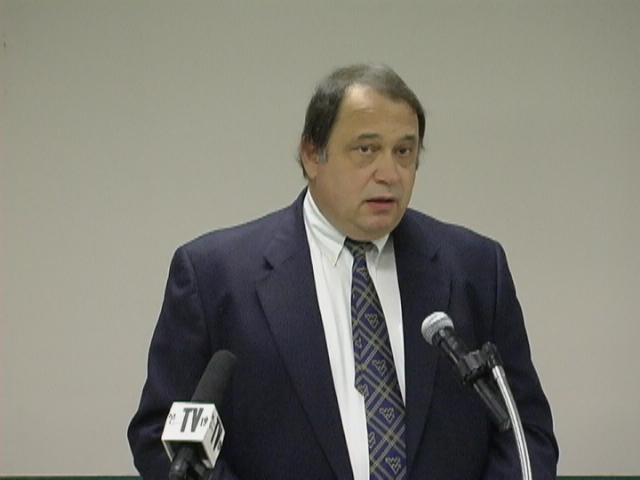
- Fragale in 2008

Member of the West Virginia House of Delegates from the 41st district
- In office 2000–2014

Personal details
- Born: August 3, 1950 Clarksburg, West Virginia, U.S.
- Died: August 7, 2024 (aged 74) Clarksburg, West Virginia, U.S.
- Party: Democratic
- Spouse: Christine
- Education: Davis and Elkins College, West Virginia University
- Profession: Educator

Ronald A. Fragale (August 3, 1950 – August 7, 2024) was an American politician who was a Democratic member of the West Virginia House of Delegates, representing the 41st District from 2000 to 2014. He served as Speaker Pro Tempore. He earlier served as a Delegate from 1990 through 1998.

Fragale died in Clarksburg, West Virginia on August 7, 2024, at the age of 74.
