= Carol Miller (politician) =

American politician (born 1950)

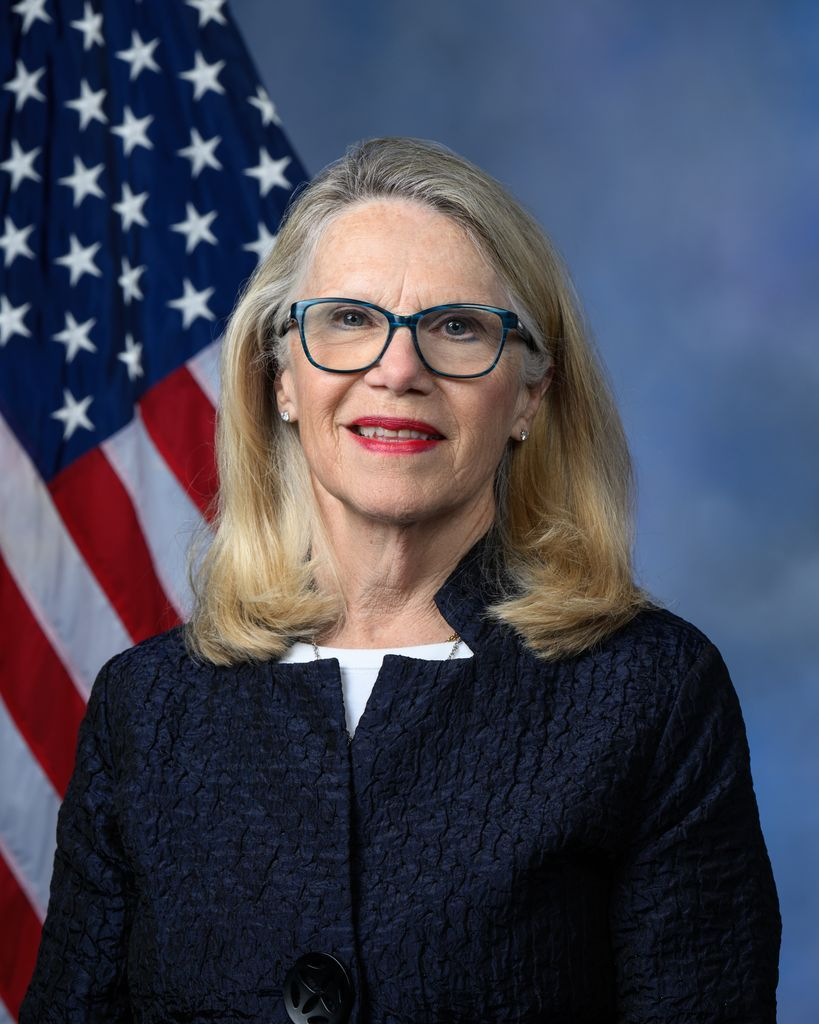
- Official portrait, 2024

Member of the U.S. House of Representatives from West Virginia
- Incumbent
- Assumed office January 3, 2019
- Preceded by: Evan Jenkins
- Constituency: 3rd district (2019–2023); 1st district (2023–present)

Member of the West Virginia House of Delegates
- In office December 1, 2006 – December 1, 2018
- Preceded by: Margarette Leach
- Succeeded by: John Mandt
- Constituency: 15th district (2006–2012); 16th district (2012–2018)

Personal details
- Born: Carol Devine; November 4, 1950 (age 75) Columbus, Ohio, U.S.
- Party: Republican
- Parent: Samuel L. Devine (father)
- Education: Columbia College, South Carolina (BA)
- Website: House website
- Miller's voice Miller honoring victims of the Holocaust. Recorded January 30, 2020

Carol Miller (née Devine; born November 4, 1950) is an American politician, educator, and farmer serving as the U.S. representative for West Virginia's 1st congressional district since 2023. A member of the Republican Party, she previously represented the 3rd district from 2019 to 2023, prior to redistricting. Her district covers the southern half of West Virginia, including the cities of Beckley, Bluefield, Charleston, and Huntington.

Miller represented the 15th district in the West Virginia House of Delegates from 2007 to 2013, and the 16th district from 2013 to 2019.

== Education ==
Miller earned a bachelor's degree in history and political science from Columbia College in Columbia, South Carolina.

== West Virginia House of Delegates ==
Challenging District 15 Democratic representatives Margarette Leach, Kevin Craig, and Jim Morgan, Miller placed in the four-way three-selectee 2004 Republican primary, but lost the six-way three-position general election. (All the incumbents were reelected.)

Challenging the incumbents again, Miller placed in the six-way three-selectee 2006 Republican primary and was elected in the six-way three-position general election, unseating Leach. Craig and Morgan were reelected.

Miller placed first in the three-way Republican primary on May 13, 2008, with 2,116 votes (43.8%). She then placed third in the six-way three-position general election, with 8,163 votes (18.2%), behind Craig and Morgan and ahead of non-selectee candidates Democrat Carl Eastham, and Republicans James Carden and Paula Stewart.

Miller placed first in the three-way Republican primary on May 11, 2010, with 1,505 votes (44.4%). She then placed second in the six-way three-position general election, with 6,601 votes (19.7%), behind Craig and ahead of Morgan and non-selectee candidates Democrat Matthew Woelfel, and Republicans Patrick Lucas and Douglas Franklin.

With all three incumbent District 15 representatives redistricted to District 16, Miller placed first in the Republican primary on May 8, 2012, with 1,745 votes (19.6%). She then placed second in the five-way three-position general election, with 8,415 votes (21.8%), behind Craig and ahead of Morgan and non-selectee candidates Democrat Sean Hornbuckle and Republican Mike Davis.

== U.S. House of Representatives ==
=== Elections ===
==== 2018 ====
On May 8, 2017, incumbent U.S. Representative Evan Jenkins announced his intention to run against incumbent Democratic U.S. Senator Joe Manchin. In August 2017, Miller announced her intention to run to fill Jenkins's seat.

On May 8, 2018, Miller defeated State Delegate Rupie Phillips and State Delegate Marty Gearheart. She received 23.8% of the vote, and won three of the 18 counties in the district. Miller went on to face State Senator Richard Ojeda.

Many polling outlets considered this race Lean Republican or a tossup. On November 6, Miller defeated Ojeda with 56.4% of the vote, winning all but two counties in the district. Upon election, she became the first woman to represent West Virginia's 3rd congressional district and the only Republican woman to be elected to an open seat in 2018.

==== 2020 ====
Miller was reelected, defeating Russell Siegel in the Republican primary and Hilary Turner in the general election with 71.3% of the vote.

==== 2022 ====
As a result of redistricting after the 2020 United States Census, Miller's district was renumbered as the 1st district. With West Virginia losing a district, the state ended its longstanding scheme of numbering districts from north to south, instead having the 1st district in the south and the 2nd district in the north. Miller retained all the counties in the old 3rd, while gaining the ten southernmost counties from the old 2nd (including Kanawha County, home to Charleston) and one county from the old 1st. She announced on the day the map was finalized that she would run for reelection in the new 1st district. On May 10, 2022, she won the Republican primary with 66% of the vote. She defeated perennial candidate Lacy Watson in the general election with 66.7% of the vote.

==== 2024 ====
In the 2024 election, she won reelection with 66.4% of the vote.

=== Tenure ===
In December 2020, Miller was one of 126 Republican members of the House of Representatives to sign an amicus brief in support of Texas v. Pennsylvania, a lawsuit filed at the United States Supreme Court contesting the results of the 2020 presidential election, in which Joe Biden defeated incumbent Donald Trump. The Supreme Court declined to hear the case on the basis that Texas lacked standing under Article III of the Constitution to challenge the results of an election held by another state.

During the COVID-19 pandemic, auto dealerships owned by Miller's husband received loans of over $3 million as part of the Paycheck Protection Program (PPP); the loans were later forgiven. Miller voted against the TRUTH Act (H.R. 6782), a bill that would have required public disclosure of companies that received funds through the bailout program.

In September 2022, Business Insider reported that Miller had violated the Stop Trading on Congressional Knowledge (STOCK) Act of 2012, a federal transparency and conflict-of-interest law, by failing to properly disclose 21 stock trades made by her husband in 2021 worth between $217,021 and $805,000.

On October 5, 2023, Miller signed a letter to the House Agriculture Committee along with 15 House Republicans opposing the inclusion of the Ending Agricultural Trade Suppression (EATS) Act in the 2023 farm bill. The EATS Act, introduced in response to the California farm animal welfare law Proposition 12, would have overturned state and local regulations on agricultural goods sold across state lines. The letter argued that the legislation would infringe on states' rights and disproportionately benefit foreign-owned agribusinesses like the Chinese-owned pork producer WH Group.

Miller opposes free trade and supports an America First policy approach on trade that ends trade deals that send jobs overseas.

==== April 2025 Trip to El Salvador ====
In April 2025, Miller traveled to El Salvador and received a tour of Centro de Confinamiento del Terrorismo (CECOT), a maximum security prison used by the Trump administration to hold U.S. immigrants removed from the United States, including immigrants like Kilmar Abrego Garcia who was illegally transported to the prison.

=== Committee assignments ===
For the 119th Congress:

- Committee on Ways and Means
  - Subcommittee on Health
  - Subcommittee on Trade

=== Caucus memberships ===
- Main Street Caucus
- U.S.-Japan Caucus
- Congressional Energy Export Caucus
- Congressional Coal Caucus
- Congressional Western Caucus
- Congressional Friends of Ecuador Caucus
- Congressional Appalachian Caucus
- Congressional Mental Health Caucus
- Congressional India and Indian American Caucus
- Congressional STARBASE Caucus
- Rare Disease Caucus
- United States–China Working Group

== Personal life ==
Miller is a Baptist.

Miller owns a bison farm that she personally managed until she was elected to Congress.

While serving in the House of Delegates, Miller taught a manners class to the elementary schools of Huntington. While doing that, she earned the nickname "Miss Manners".

Miller's son, Chris Miller, ran for Governor of West Virginia in the 2024 West Virginia gubernatorial election, running for the term-limited seat of incumbent Jim Justice. He came third in the Republican primary, receiving 20% of the vote.

== Electoral history ==
2018 Republican primary results
Party	Candidate	Votes	%
Republican	Carol Miller	8,936	23.8
Republican	Rupert Phillips	7,320	19.5
Republican	Marty Gearheart	6,833	18.2
Republican	Conrad Lucas	6,812	18.1
Republican	Rick Snuffer	4,032	10.7
Republican	Ayne Amjad	2,791	7.4
Republican	Philip Payton	861	2.3
Total votes		37,585	100.0

West Virginia's 3rd congressional district, 2018
Party	Candidate	Votes	%
Republican	Carol Miller	98,645	56.4
Democratic	Richard Ojeda	76,340	43.6
Total votes		174,985	100.0
Republican hold			

2020 Republican primary results
Party	Candidate	Votes	%
Republican	Carol Miller (incumbent)	40,226	70.3
Republican	Russell Siegel	17,024	29.7
Total votes		57,250	100.0

West Virginia's 3rd congressional district, 2020
Party	Candidate	Votes	%
Republican	Carol Miller (incumbent)	161,585	71.3
Democratic	Hilary Turner	64,927	28.7
Total votes		226,512	100.0
Republican hold			

West Virginia's 1st congressional district, 2022
Party	Candidate	Votes	%
Republican	Carol Miller (incumbent)	151,511	66.7
Democratic	Lacy Watson	65,428	28.8
Independent	Belinda Fox-Spencer	10,257	4.5
Total votes		227,196	100.0
Republican hold			

West Virginia's 1st congressional district, 2024
Party	Candidate	Votes	%
Republican	Carol Miller (incumbent)	228,491	66.4
Democratic	Chris Reed	90,038	26.1
Independent	Wes Holden	25,616	7.4
Write-in		174	0.1
Total votes		344,319	100.0
Republican hold			

== See also ==
- Women in the United States House of Representatives

U.S. House of Representatives
Preceded by Evan Jenkins	Member of the U.S. House of Representatives from West Virginia's 3rd congressional district 2019–2023	Constituency abolished
Preceded by David McKinley	Member of the U.S. House of Representatives from West Virginia's 1st congressional district 2023–present	Incumbent
U.S. order of precedence (ceremonial)
Preceded by Dan Meuser	United States representatives by seniority 215th	Succeeded by Joe Neguse
