= Mary Poling =

American politician (born 1946)

Member of the West Virginia House of Delegates from the 47th district
- In office January 12, 2013 – 2014
- Preceded by: Harold Michael

Member of the West Virginia House of Delegates from the 40th district
- In office January 2001 – January 2013
- Preceded by: Rick Everson
- Succeeded by: Tim Armstead

Personal details
- Born: November 23, 1946 (age 79) Barbour County, West Virginia, U.S.
- Party: Democratic
- Education: West Virginia University

Mary M. Poling (born November 23, 1946) is an American politician who was a Democratic member of the West Virginia House of Delegates representing District 47 from January 12, 2013 to 2014. Poling served consecutively from January 2001 until January 2013 in the District 40 seat.

== Education ==
Poling earned her BS and MS from West Virginia University.

== Elections ==
- 2012 Redistricted to District 47, and with incumbent Representative Harold Michael retiring, Poling was unopposed for the May 8, 2012, Democratic Primary, winning with 1,971 votes, and won the November 6, 2012, General election with 3,612 votes (54.7%) against Republican nominee John Rose, who was still on the ballot due to a technicality despite having died 7 days earlier while surveying his property for damage caused by Hurricane Sandy.
- 2000 When House District 40 Representative Rick Everson left the Legislature and left the seat open, Poling won the three-way 2000 Democratic Primary and won the November 7, 2000, General election against Republican nominee Lonnie Moore, who had run for the seat in 1998.
- 2002 Poling and returning 2000 opponent Lonnie Moore both won their 2002 primaries, setting up a rematch; Poling won the November 5, 2002, General election against Moore.
- 2004 Poling was unopposed for the 2004 Democratic Primary and won November 2, 2004, General election against Republican nominee William Wright.
- 2006 Poling was unopposed for the 2006 Democratic Primary and won the November 7, 2006, General election against Republican nominee Garry Tenney.
- 2008 Poling and returning 2000 and 2002 Republican opponent Lonnie Moore were both unopposed for their May 13, 2008, primaries, setting up their third contest; Poling won the November 4, 2008, General election with 4,767 votes (63.9%) against Moore.
- 2010 Poling and Moore were both unopposed for their May 11, 2010, primaries, setting up their fourth contest; Poling won the November 2, 2010, General election with 3,568 votes (62.3%) against Moore.
