= Brent Boggs =

American politician

Member of the West Virginia House of Delegates from the 34th district
- In office December 1, 1996 – December 1, 2022
- Preceded by: Marjorie Burke
- Succeeded by: Lori Dittman

Personal details
- Born: Lawrence Brent Boggs; December 18, 1955 (age 70) Fairmont, West Virginia, U.S.
- Party: Democratic
- Education: Glenville State College
- Website: brentboggswv.com

Lawrence Brent Boggs (born December 18, 1955) is an American politician and a former Democratic member of the West Virginia House of Delegates, representing District 34 from December 1996 to December 2022.

== Education ==
Boggs earned his AS from Glenville State College.

== Elections ==
- 2012 Boggs was unopposed for both the May 8, 2012 Democratic Primary, winning with 3,110 votes, and the November 6, 2012 General election, winning with 4,741 votes.
- 1996 Boggs was initially elected to the District 34 seat in the 1996 Democratic Primary and the November 5, 1996 General election.
- 1998 Boggs was challenged in the 1998 Democratic Primary and won the November 3, 1998 General election against Republican nominee Alfred Lipps.
- 2000 Boggs was unopposed for the 2000 Democratic Primary and won the November 7, 2000 General election against Republican nominee Joseph Brannon.
- 2002 Boggs was unopposed for both the 2002 Democratic Primary and the November 5, 2002 General election.
- 2004 Boggs was unopposed for the 2004 Democratic Primary and won the November 2, 2004 General election against Republican nominee Bradley Shingler.
- 2006 Boggs was unopposed for both the 2006 Democratic Primary and the November 7, 2006 General election.
- 2008 Boggs was unopposed for the May 13, 2008 Democratic Primary, winning with 4,504 votes, and won the November 4, 2008 General election with 5,206 votes (83.4%) against Republican nominee Larry Bright.
- 2010 Boggs was unopposed for both the May 11, 2010 Democratic Primary, winning with 2,773 votes, and the November 2, 2010 General election, winning with 4,131 votes.
