= Barbara Hatfield =

American politician (born 1935)

Member of the West Virginia House of Representatives from the 30th district
- In office 1998–2012
- In office 1984–1990

Personal details
- Born: December 17, 1935 (age 90)
- Party: Democratic

Barbara (Bobbie) Hatfield (born December 17, 1935) is an American politician from West Virginia. She is a Democrat and represented District 30 in the West Virginia House of Delegates from 1998 to 2012.
