= Kelli Sobonya =

American politician (born 1963)

Member of the West Virginia House of Delegates from the 18th district
- In office 2002–2018
- Succeeded by: Evan Worrell

Personal details
- Born: July 13, 1963 (age 63) Ironton, Ohio, U.S.
- Party: Republican
- Spouse: Ed Sobonya
- Education: Institute of Computer Management
- Profession: Real Estate Agent

Kelli Sobonya (born July 13, 1963) is a former Republican member of the West Virginia House of Delegates and a current member of the Cabell County Commission. She represented District 18 from 2002 to 2018.

Sobonya received her diploma from Ambridge High School. She went on to receive her certification in computer science from the Institute of Computer Management in Pittsburgh, Pennsylvania in 1982.

Sobonya worked as an administrative assistant for Covenant School and for Ashland Oil, Incorporated from 1983 to 1987. She was a managed care coordinator for the Department of Family and Community Health at the Marshall University School of Medicine from 1988 to 1995. She was also the owner of Gym Factory Tumble Jungle, Incorporated from 1988 to 2005. From 1996 to 2007, Sobonya was a realtor for Metro Properties, and has worked as a realtor for Century 21 Home and Land Incorporated since 2007.
