= Harold Michael =

American politician

Harold K. Michael (October 9, 1943 - ) is an American insurance agent from Moorefield, West Virginia, who has served as a Democratic member of the West Virginia House of Delegates representing what is now the 47th District since 1988.

== Background ==
Born October 9, 1943, son of Merl H. and Flossie V. Michael, Michael has studied at Strayer University, and is an insurance agent by profession (he is past President of the West Virginia Nationwide Insurance Agents).

== Legislative service ==
He served as Democratic Majority Whip during the 72nd Legislature; and as Chairman of the standing committee on finance during the 73rd, 74th, 75th, 76th and 77th Legislatures.

== Personal life ==
He is married to the former Patricia Burns; their children are Harold K. Jr., Melissa Lee, Brandi M., and Tasha Nichole Michael. He is a Methodist and a Freemason.
