= Tim Manchin =

American politician and attorney

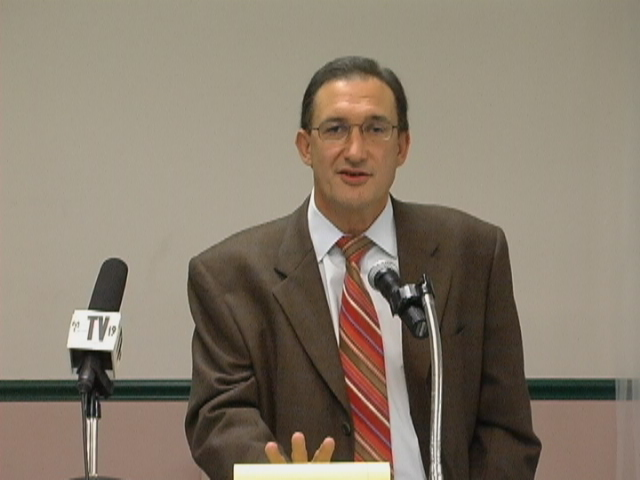
- Manchin in September 2008

Member of the West Virginia House of Delegates from the 43rd district
- In office November 20, 2003 – November 2017
- Preceded by: A. James Manchin
- Succeeded by: Guy Ward

Personal details
- Born: July 6, 1955 (age 71) Farmington, West Virginia, U.S.
- Party: Democratic
- Spouse: Susan Manchin
- Education: West Virginia University
- Occupation: attorney

Timothy J. Manchin (born July 6, 1955) is an American politician and attorney. He served in the West Virginia House of Delegates from 2003 to 2017. He was appointed to the seat vacated by the death of his uncle, A. James Manchin, in November 2003.

== Early life, education, and law career ==
Tim Manchin was born in 1955 in Farmington, West Virginia to Ann Manchin and Joseph Manchin II. He graduated from Bridgeport High School. He got a B.S. cum laude from West Virginia University in 1977 and his J.D. from West Virginia College of Law in 1980. In 2011, after his law partner of 25 years became a West Virginia circuit court judge, Manchin founded the Manchin Injury Law Group in Fairmont, West Virginia.

He is a former president of West Virginia Trial Lawyers Association. He was also a board member of the City National Bank and the West Virginia Division of Labor Manufactured Housing.

== West Virginia legislature ==
=== Elections ===
In 2003, Democratic Governor Bob Wise appointed Tim Manchin to the Marion County-based 43rd District after the seat was vacated by the death of his uncle, A. James Manchin. He was elected in 2004 with 23%. He was re-elected in 2006 (29%), 2008 (26%), and 2010 (21%).

=== Committee assignments ===
House committees

- Banking and Insurance
- Finance
- Political Subdivisions (Chairman)
- Senior Citizen Issues

Interim committees

- Marcellus Shale (Chairman)
- Water Resources (Chairman)
- Finance
  - Finance Subcommittee C

== 2012 congressional election ==
According to Politico, Tim Manchin met with the Democratic Congressional Campaign Committee in December 2011 to talk about setting up a campaign in West Virginia's 1st congressional district, then held by David McKinley (R-WV).

== Personal life ==
Manchin lives in Fairmont, Marion County, West Virginia with his wife Susan and their son. His uncle A. James Manchin, whom he succeeded in the House of Delegates, also served as West Virginia Secretary of State and State Treasurer. Another uncle, John Manchin, was mayor of Farmington, West Virginia. One of his grandfathers, Joe Manchin I, also was Mayor of Farmington. A first cousin, Joe Manchin III, served as U.S. Senator, Governor, Secretary of State, state senator, and state delegate. Another first cousin, Michael J. Aloi, serves as a federal magistrate judge in the Northern District of West Virginia.
