= Rick Thompson =

American politician (born 1952)

Speaker of the West Virginia House of Delegates
- In office January 10, 2007 – June 15, 2013
- Preceded by: Robert Kiss
- Succeeded by: Tim Miley

Personal details
- Born: October 2, 1952 (age 74) Louisa, Kentucky, U.S.
- Party: Democratic
- Spouse: Regina Thompson
- Children: 5
- Education: Marshall University; West Virginia University, Morgantown

Richard Thompson (born October 2, 1952) is a former Democratic member of the West Virginia House of Delegates, representing the 17th District since 2000. He served as Speaker of the House from January 2007 to June 2013. He earlier served as a Delegate from 1981 through 1983. He unsuccessfully ran for Governor of West Virginia in 2011, coming in second place behind acting Governor Earl Ray Tomblin. Thompson resigned from the House of Delegates in June 2013 after being appointed by Tomblin to serve as West Virginia Secretary of Veterans Assistance. He resigned as the Assistant Secretary of Veteran Affairs to run for Wayne County Sheriff. Thompson in 2024 ran for, and was elected, Prosecuting Attorney of Wayne County. He currently is serving as the Prosecuting Attorney of Wayne County WV.

Thompson holds degrees from Marshall University and West Virginia University College of Law.
