= Mike Caputo =

American politician

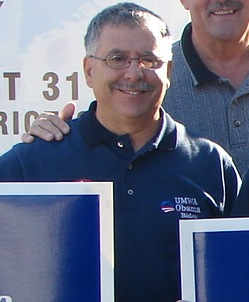
- Caputo in 2008

Member of the West Virginia Senate from the 13th district
- In office December 1, 2020 – December 1, 2024
- Preceded by: Roman Prezioso
- Succeeded by: Joey Garcia

Member of the West Virginia House of Delegates
- In office December 1, 1996 – December 1, 2020
- Preceded by: Roman Prezioso
- Succeeded by: Joey Garcia; Phil Mallow; Guy Ward
- Constituency: 43rd district (1996–2012); 50th district (2012–2020)

Personal details
- Born: September 18, 1957 (age 68) Fairmont, West Virginia, U.S.
- Party: Democratic
- Spouse: Tina Thorne
- Occupation: United Mine Workers of America International Representatives

Michael Caputo (born September 18, 1957) is an American politician who served as a Democratic member of the West Virginia Senate, representing the 13th District from 2020 to 2024. Caputo was the only new Democratic senator elected in the 2020 Senate elections.

Prior his election to the Senate, Caputo represented the 50th District in the West Virginia House of Delegates for 24 years and was most recently serving as Minority Whip. Caputo also served as majority whip for eight years until the Republicans took the majority in 2014.

He was born and raised in Rivesville, West Virginia and attended Rivesville Elementary School and Rivesville High School. He is a career coal miner and a member of the United Mine Workers of America.

== West Virginia Senate ==
In February 2023, Caputo cast the only vote against the Creating Charter Schools Stimulus Fund Bill in the West Virginia Senate.

Caputo did not run for re-election in 2024.

== Elections ==
2020: After nearly 25 years in the House, Caputo decided to run for the seat held by the retiring Minority Leader Roman Prezioso. A retired coal miner and former district vice president for the United Mine Workers of America, Caputo ran unopposed in the Democratic primary. Caputo faced retired teacher and Republican nominee Rebecca Polis in the November general election. Caputo beat Polis by a comfortable 56-44% margin.

West Virginia Senate District 13 election, 2020
Party	Candidate	Votes	%
Democratic	Mike Caputo	26,095	56.22%
Republican	Rebecca Polis	20,321	43.78%
Total votes		46,416	100.0%

== Controversy ==
Caputo was criminally charged for an incident where he allegedly kicked open a door to the House chamber which struck an assistant doorkeeper during the final week of the 2019 legislative session.

According to a criminal complaint filed by Capitol Police in Kanawha County Magistrate Court, Caputo – after being angered by an anti-Muslim display placed outside the House Chamber in March – pushed or kicked the door to the chamber open, hitting an assistant doorkeeper. Witnesses saw Caputo hit the doorkeeper with the door, who sought medical attention afterward. Caputo also allegedly injured a delegate on his way to his seat.

Caputo apologized in a floor speech the next day for kicking the door and was removed from all committee assignments by House leadership as punishment. Efforts by some House Republicans to remove Caputo from office or censure Caputo failed, and charges were eventually dismissed by the Kanawha County Circuit Court citing Caputo's legislative immunity.
