= 2008 West Virginia House of Delegates election =

- November 4, 2008

All 100 seats in the West Virginia House of Delegates 51 seats needed for a majority

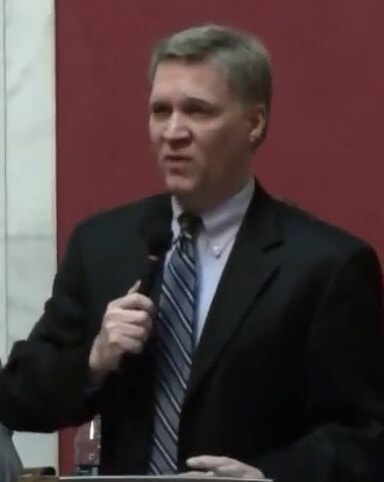
	Majority party	Minority party
Leader	Rick Thompson	Tim Armstead
Party	Democratic	Republican
Leader's seat	17th–Lavalette	32nd–Elkview
Last election	72 seats	28 seats
Seats won	71	29
Seat change	▼1	▲1
Popular vote	899,525	486,035
Percentage	64.47%	34.84%
- Democratic gain Democratic hold Republican gain Republican hold Multi-member districts: Democratic majority Republican majority Even split Democratic: 40–50% 50–60% 60–70% 70–80% 80–90% Unopposed; Republican: 50–60% 60–70% 70–80% Unopposed
Speaker before election
Rick Thompson
Democratic
Elected Speaker
Rick Thompson
Democratic

Elections to the West Virginia House of Delegates were held on November 4, 2008, to elect 100 candidates to the House to serve a two-year term. Despite a thirteen-point loss in the concurrent presidential election for Democratic nominee Barack Obama in the state, Democrats maintained their control of the state government, retaining their supermajority status in the House. Of the 100 seats up for election, Democrats won seventy-one and the Republicans twenty-nine, a net gain of one for the Republicans.

This election took place alongside races for U.S. President, U.S. Senate, U.S. House, governor, state senate, and numerous other state and local elections.

The Democratic primary in the three-seat 10th district resulted in a tie. The three highest-voted candidates in the primary would advance to the general election, and Iris McCrady and Tim Fittro tied for third-place, each with 3,304 votes. The coin toss to determine the third Democratic nominee was won by McCrady, who went on to lose the general election, placing sixth in a field of three Democrats and three Republicans.

== Results ==
=== Overall ===
2008 West Virginia House of Delegates general election results and statistics
Party	Candidates		Seats		Aggregate votes			2006 general		Change	
Party	Prim.	Gen.	Seats		No.	Percent		Seats	Vote %	Seats	Vote %
Democratic	156	92	71		899,525	64.47%		72	59.81%	−1	+4.66%
Republican	74	62	29		486,035	34.84%		28	39.97%	+1	−5.13%
Mountain	1	2	0		5,606	0.40%		0	0.18%	—	+0.22%
Independents	—	1	0		3,102	0.22%		DNC		—	
Constitution	0	1	0		917	0.07%		DNC		—	
Totals	158	100		1,395,185	100%		100	—	—	—	
Turnout				702,109	57.92%		—	26.22%	—	+31.70%	
Registered voters				1,212,117							

=== By district ===
District	Seats	Counties represented	Incumbent			Elected	
District	Seats	Counties represented	Party	Delegate	Result	Party	Delegate
1st	2-seat	Hancock; Brooke (p)	Democratic	Randy Swartzmiller	Incumbent re-elected.	Democratic	Randy Swartzmiller
1st	2-seat	Hancock; Brooke (p)	Democratic	Joe DeLong	Incumbent retired to run for secretary of state. Republican gain.	Republican	Pat McGeehan
2nd	2-seat	Brooke (p); Ohio (p)	Democratic	Tim Ennis	Incumbent re-elected.	Democratic	Tim Ennis
2nd	2-seat	Brooke (p); Ohio (p)	Democratic	Jack Yost	Incumbent retired to run for state senate. Democratic hold.	Democratic	Roy Givens
3rd	2-seat	Ohio (p)	Democratic	Tal Hutchins	Incumbent re-elected.	Democratic	Tal Hutchins
3rd	2-seat	Ohio (p)	Democratic	Orphy Klempa	Incumbent re-elected.	Democratic	Orphy Klempa
4th	2-seat	Marshall; Ohio (p)	Democratic	Scott G. Varner	Incumbent re-elected.	Democratic	Scott G. Varner
4th	2-seat	Marshall; Ohio (p)	Democratic	Kenneth D. Tucker	Incumbent lost renomination. Democratic hold.	Democratic	Michael Ferro
5th	1-seat	Monongalia (p); Wetzel (p)	Democratic	Dave Pethtel	Incumbent re-elected.	Democratic	Dave Pethtel
6th	1-seat	Doddridge; Tyler; Wetzel (p)	Republican	William Romine	Incumbent re-elected.	Republican	William Romine
7th	1-seat	Pleasants; Ritchie	Republican	Lynwood Ireland	Incumbent re-elected.	Republican	Lynwood Ireland
8th	1-seat	Wood (p)	Republican	Bill Anderson	Incumbent re-elected.	Republican	Bill Anderson
9th	1-seat	Wirt; Wood (p)	Republican	Larry Border	Incumbent re-elected.	Republican	Larry Border
10th	3-seat	Wood (p)	Republican	Tom Azinger	Incumbent re-elected.	Republican	Tom Azinger
10th	3-seat	Wood (p)	Republican	John Ellem	Incumbent re-elected.	Republican	John Ellem
10th	3-seat	Wood (p)	Democratic	Daniel Poling	Incumbent re-elected.	Democratic	Daniel Poling
11th	1-seat	Jackson (p); Roane (p)	Republican	Bob Ashley	Incumbent re-elected.	Republican	Bob Ashley
12th	1-seat	Jackson (p)	Republican	Mitch Carmichael	Incumbent re-elected.	Republican	Mitch Carmichael
13th	2-seat	Jackson (p); Mason (p); Putnam (p)	Democratic	Dale F. Martin	Incumbent re-elected.	Democratic	Dale F. Martin
13th	2-seat	Jackson (p); Mason (p); Putnam (p)	Democratic	Brady Paxton	Incumbent re-elected.	Democratic	Brady Paxton
14th	2-seat	Mason (p); Putnam (p)	Republican	Troy Andes	Incumbent re-elected.	Republican	Troy Andes
14th	2-seat	Mason (p); Putnam (p)	Republican	Patti Schoen	Incumbent re-elected.	Republican	Patti Schoen
15th	3-seat	Cabell (p); Lincoln (p)	Democratic	Kevin Craig	Incumbent re-elected.	Democratic	Kevin Craig
15th	3-seat	Cabell (p); Lincoln (p)	Republican	Carol Miller	Incumbent re-elected.	Republican	Carol Miller
15th	3-seat	Cabell (p); Lincoln (p)	Democratic	Jim Morgan	Incumbent re-elected.	Democratic	Jim Morgan
16th	3-seat	Cabell (p); Wayne (p)	Democratic	Doug Reynolds	Incumbent re-elected.	Democratic	Doug Reynolds
16th	3-seat	Cabell (p); Wayne (p)	Republican	Kelli Sobonya	Incumbent re-elected.	Republican	Kelli Sobonya
16th	3-seat	Cabell (p); Wayne (p)	Democratic	Dale Stephens	Incumbent re-elected.	Democratic	Dale Stephens
17th	2-seat	Wayne (p)	Democratic	Don Perdue	Incumbent re-elected.	Democratic	Don Perdue
17th	2-seat	Wayne (p)	Democratic	Rick Thompson	Incumbent re-elected.	Democratic	Rick Thompson
18th	1-seat	Boone (p)	Democratic	Larry Barker	Incumbent re-elected.	Democratic	Larry Barker
19th	4-seat	Boone (p); Lincoln (p); Logan; Putnam (p)	Democratic	Jeff Eldridge	Incumbent re-elected.	Democratic	Jeff Eldridge
19th	4-seat	Boone (p); Lincoln (p); Logan; Putnam (p)	Democratic	Ralph Rodighiero	Incumbent re-elected.	Democratic	Ralph Rodighiero
19th	4-seat	Boone (p); Lincoln (p); Logan; Putnam (p)	Democratic	Ted Ellis	Incumbent lost renomination. Democratic hold.	Democratic	Greg Butcher
19th	4-seat	Boone (p); Lincoln (p); Logan; Putnam (p)	Democratic	Lidella Wilson Hrutkay	Incumbent lost renomination. Democratic hold.	Democratic	Josh Stowers
20th	1-seat	Mingo (p); Wayne (p)	Democratic	Steven Kominar	Incumbent re-elected.	Democratic	Steven Kominar
21st	1-seat	McDowell (p); Mingo (p)	Democratic	Harry Keith White	Incumbent re-elected.	Democratic	Harry Keith White
22nd	2-seat	McDowell (p); Mercer (p); Wyoming	Democratic	Richard Browning	Incumbent retired to run for state senate. Democratic hold.	Democratic	Daniel Hall
22nd	2-seat	McDowell (p); Mercer (p); Wyoming	Democratic	Mike Burdiss	Incumbent lost renomination. Democratic hold.	Democratic	Linda Phillips
23rd	1-seat	McDowell (p)	Democratic	Clif Moore	Incumbent re-elected.	Democratic	Clif Moore
24th	1-seat	Mercer (p)	Democratic	Eustace Frederick	Incumbent retired. Republican gain.	Republican	John Shott
25th	2-seat	Mercer (p)	Democratic	Marshall Long	Incumbent lost re-election. Democratic hold.	Democratic	John R. Frazier
25th	2-seat	Mercer (p)	Republican	T. Mike Porter	Incumbent re-elected.	Republican	T. Mike Porter
26th	1-seat	Monroe; Summers (p)	Democratic	Gerald Crosier	Incumbent re-elected.	Democratic	Gerald Crosier
27th	5-seat	Raleigh; Summers (p)	Democratic	Virginia Mahan	Incumbent re-elected.	Democratic	Virginia Mahan
27th	5-seat	Raleigh; Summers (p)	Democratic	Rick Moye	Incumbent re-elected.	Democratic	Rick Moye
27th	5-seat	Raleigh; Summers (p)	Republican	Linda Sumner	Incumbent re-elected.	Republican	Linda Sumner
27th	5-seat	Raleigh; Summers (p)	Democratic	Louis Gall	Incumbent lost re-election. Democratic hold.	Democratic	Sally Susman
27th	5-seat	Raleigh; Summers (p)	Democratic	Mel Kessler	Incumbent retired to run for governor. Democratic hold.	Democratic	William R. Wooton
28th	2-seat	Greenbrier	Democratic	Tom Campbell	Incumbent re-elected.	Democratic	Tom Campbell
28th	2-seat	Greenbrier	Republican	Ray Canterbury	Incumbent re-elected.	Republican	Ray Canterbury
29th	3-seat	Clay (p); Fayette; Nicholas (p)	Democratic	David Perry	Incumbent re-elected.	Democratic	David Perry
29th	3-seat	Clay (p); Fayette; Nicholas (p)	Democratic	Margaret Anne Staggers	Incumbent re-elected.	Democratic	Margaret Anne Staggers
29th	3-seat	Clay (p); Fayette; Nicholas (p)	Democratic	John Pino	Incumbent lost renomination. Democratic hold.	Democratic	Tom Louisos
30th	7-seat	Kanawha (p)	Democratic	Bonnie Brown	Incumbent re-elected.	Democratic	Bonnie Brown
30th	7-seat	Kanawha (p)	Democratic	Nancy Peoples Guthrie	Incumbent re-elected.	Democratic	Nancy Peoples Guthrie
30th	7-seat	Kanawha (p)	Democratic	Barbara Hatfield	Incumbent re-elected.	Democratic	Barbara Hatfield
30th	7-seat	Kanawha (p)	Democratic	Sharon Spencer	Incumbent re-elected.	Democratic	Sharon Spencer
30th	7-seat	Kanawha (p)	Democratic	Danny Wells	Incumbent re-elected.	Democratic	Danny Wells
30th	7-seat	Kanawha (p)	Democratic	Dave Higgins	Incumbent lost renomination. Democratic hold.	Democratic	Mark Hunt
30th	7-seat	Kanawha (p)	Democratic	Corey Palumbo	Incumbent retired to run for state senate. Democratic hold.	Democratic	Doug Skaff
31st	1-seat	Kanawha (p)	Democratic	Carrie Webster	Incumbent re-elected.	Democratic	Carrie Webster
32nd	3-seat	Kanawha (p)	Republican	Tim Armstead	Incumbent re-elected.	Republican	Tim Armstead
32nd	3-seat	Kanawha (p)	Republican	Patrick Lane	Incumbent re-elected.	Republican	Patrick Lane
32nd	3-seat	Kanawha (p)	Republican	Ronald N. Walters	Incumbent re-elected.	Republican	Ronald N. Walters
33rd	1-seat	Calhoun; Clay (p); Gilmer (p)	Democratic	William Stemple	Incumbent retired. Democratic hold.	Democratic	David Walker
34th	1-seat	Braxton; Gilmer (p)	Democratic	Brent Boggs	Incumbent re-elected.	Democratic	Brent Boggs
35th	1-seat	Nicholas (p)	Democratic	Sam Argento	Incumbent re-elected.	Democratic	Sam Argento
36th	1-seat	Nicholas (p); Webster	Democratic	Joseph B. Talbott	Incumbent re-elected.	Democratic	Joseph B. Talbott
37th	2-seat	Pocahontas; Randolph	Democratic	William G. Hartman	Incumbent re-elected.	Democratic	William G. Hartman
37th	2-seat	Pocahontas; Randolph	Democratic	Bill Proudfoot	Incumbent re-elected.	Democratic	Bill Proudfoot
38th	1-seat	Lewis; Upshur (p)	Democratic	Doug Stalnaker	Incumbent retired to run for state senate. Democratic hold.	Democratic	Margaret Smith
39th	1-seat	Upshur (p)	Republican	Bill Hamilton	Incumbent re-elected.	Republican	Bill Hamilton
40th	1-seat	Barbour; Upshur (p)	Democratic	Mary Poling	Incumbent re-elected.	Democratic	Mary Poling
41st	4-seat	Harrison; Marion (p)	Democratic	Sam Cann	Incumbent re-elected.	Democratic	Sam Cann
41st	4-seat	Harrison; Marion (p)	Democratic	Ron Fragale	Incumbent re-elected.	Democratic	Ron Fragale
41st	4-seat	Harrison; Marion (p)	Democratic	Richard Iaquinta	Incumbent re-elected.	Democratic	Richard Iaquinta
41st	4-seat	Harrison; Marion (p)	Democratic	Tim Miley	Incumbent re-elected.	Democratic	Tim Miley
42nd	1-seat	Marion (p); Monongalia (p); Taylor	Republican	Jeff Tansill	Incumbent retired. Democratic gain.	Democratic	Mike Manypenny
43rd	3-seat	Marion (p); Monongalia (p)	Democratic	Mike Caputo	Incumbent re-elected.	Democratic	Mike Caputo
43rd	3-seat	Marion (p); Monongalia (p)	Democratic	Tim Manchin	Incumbent re-elected.	Democratic	Tim Manchin
43rd	3-seat	Marion (p); Monongalia (p)	Democratic	Linda Longstreth	Incumbent re-elected.	Democratic	Linda Longstreth
44th	4-seat	Monongalia (p)	Democratic	Bob Beach	Incumbent re-elected.	Democratic	Bob Beach
44th	4-seat	Monongalia (p)	Democratic	Barbara Fleischauer	Incumbent re-elected.	Democratic	Barbara Fleischauer
44th	4-seat	Monongalia (p)	Democratic	Charlene Marshall	Incumbent re-elected.	Democratic	Charlene Marshall
44th	4-seat	Monongalia (p)	Democratic	Alex Shook	Incumbent re-elected.	Democratic	Alex Shook
45th	1-seat	Preston (p)	Democratic	Larry Williams	Incumbent re-elected.	Democratic	Larry Williams
46th	1-seat	Preston (p); Tucker	Democratic	Stanley Shaver	Incumbent re-elected.	Democratic	Stanley Shaver
47th	1-seat	Hardy; Pendleton (p)	Democratic	Harold Michael	Incumbent re-elected.	Democratic	Harold Michael
48th	1-seat	Grant; Mineral (p); Pendleton (p)	Republican	Allen V. Evans	Incumbent re-elected.	Republican	Allen V. Evans
49th	1-seat	Mineral (p)	Republican	Robert Schadler	Incumbent re-elected.	Republican	Robert Schadler
50th	1-seat	Hampshire (p); Mineral (p)	Republican	Ruth Rowan	Incumbent re-elected.	Republican	Ruth Rowan
51st	1-seat	Hampshire (p); Morgan (p)	Republican	Daryl Cowles	Incumbent re-elected.	Republican	Daryl Cowles
52nd	1-seat	Berkeley (p); Morgan (p)	Republican	Craig Blair	Incumbent re-elected.	Republican	Craig Blair
53rd	1-seat	Berkeley (p)	Republican	Jonathan Miller	Incumbent re-elected.	Republican	Jonathan Miller
54th	1-seat	Berkeley (p)	Republican	Walter Duke	Incumbent re-elected.	Republican	Walter Duke
55th	1-seat	Berkeley (p)	Republican	John Overington	Incumbent re-elected.	Republican	John Overington
56th	1-seat	Berkeley (p); Jefferson (p)	Democratic	Robert C. Tabb	Incumbent re-elected.	Democratic	Robert C. Tabb
57th	1-seat	Jefferson (p)	Democratic	John Doyle	Incumbent re-elected.	Democratic	John Doyle
58th	1-seat	Jefferson (p)	Democratic	Locke Wysong	Incumbent retired. Democratic hold.	Democratic	Tiffany Lawrence

== Predictions ==
Source	Ranking	As of
Stateline	Safe D	October 15, 2008

== General election results ==
General election results sourced from the West Virginia Secretary of State.

=== Single-member districts ===
District	Democratic			Republican			Others			Total		
District	Candidate	Votes	%	Candidate	Votes	%	Candidate	Votes	%	Votes	Maj.	Mrg.
5th	Dave Pethtel (incumbent)	5,025	84.57%	—	—	—	Denzil W. Sloan (Cst.)	917	15.43%	5,942	+4,108	+69.13%
6th	—	—	—	William Romine (incumbent)	5,845	100.00%	—	—	—	5,845	−5,845	−100.00%
7th	Ron Nichols	2,412	36.36%	Lynwood Ireland (incumbent)	4,222	63.64%	—	—	—	6,634	−1,810	−27.28%
8th	Charles T. Webb	2,436	32.66%	Bill Anderson (incumbent)	5,023	67.34%	—	—	—	7,459	−2,587	−34.68%
9th	Jim Marion	3,237	42.90%	Larry Border (incumbent)	4,308	57.10%	—	—	—	7,545	−1,071	−14.19%
11th	—	—	—	Bob Ashley (incumbent)	4,983	100.00%	—	—	—	4,983	−4,983	−100.00%
12th	Jo Phillips	3,941	46.94%	Mitch Carmichael (incumbent)	4,454	53.06%	—	—	—	8,395	−513	−6.11%
18th	Larry Barker (incumbent)	5,282	100.00%	—	—	—	—	—	—	5,282	+5,282	+100.00%
20th	Steven Kominar (incumbent)	4,426	100.00%	—	—	—	—	—	—	4,426	+4,426	+100.00%
21st	Harry Keith White (incumbent)	3,461	100.00%	—	—	—	—	—	—	3,461	+3,461	+100.00%
23rd	Clif Moore (incumbent)	3,718	100.00%	—	—	—	—	—	—	3,718	+3,718	+100.00%
24th	Mike Vinciguerra Jr.	2,724	46.42%	John Shott	3,144	53.58%	—	—	—	5,868	−420	−7.16%
26th	Gerald Crosier (incumbent)	5,346	100.00%	—	—	—	—	—	—	5,346	+5,346	+100.00%
31st	Carrie Webster (incumbent)	5,125	100.00%	—	—	—	—	—	—	5,125	+5,125	+100.00%
33rd	David Walker	3,635	67.87%	Larry Wayne Cole	1,721	32.13%	—	—	—	5,356	+1,914	+35.74%
34th	Brent Boggs (incumbent)	5,206	83.43%	Larry M. Bright	1,034	16.57%	—	—	—	6,240	+4,172	+66.86%
35th	Sam Argento (incumbent)	5,575	100.00%	—	—	—	—	—	—	5,575	+5,575	+100.00%
36th	Joseph B. Talbott (incumbent)	4,309	100.00%	—	—	—	—	—	—	4,309	+4,309	+100.00%
38th	Margaret Smith	4,510	65.73%	Derrick W. Love	2,351	34.27%	—	—	—	6,861	+2,159	+31.47%
39th	—	—	—	Bill Hamilton (incumbent)	6,285	100.00%	—	—	—	6,285	−6,285	−100.00%
40th	Mary Poling (incumbent)	4,767	63.89%	Lonnie Moore Sr.	2,694	36.11%	—	—	—	7,461	+2,073	+27.78%
42nd	Mike Manypenny	5,913	100.00%	—	—	—	—	—	—	5,913	+5,913	+100.00%
45th	Larry Williams (incumbent)	5,964	100.00%	—	—	—	—	—	—	5,964	+5,964	+100.00%
46th	Stanley Shaver (incumbent)	6,072	100.00%	—	—	—	—	—	—	6,072	+6,072	+100.00%
47th	Harold Michael (incumbent)	6,697	100.00%	—	—	—	—	—	—	6,697	+6,697	+100.00%
48th	Donna Kuhn	2,614	35.90%	Allen V. Evans (incumbent)	4,668	64.10%	—	—	—	7,282	−2,054	−28.21%
49th	—	—	—	Robert Schadler (incumbent)	6,113	100.00%	—	—	—	6,113	−6,113	−100.00%
50th	Royce Saville	2,683	36.96%	Ruth Rowan (incumbent)	4,576	63.04%	—	—	—	7,259	−1,893	−26.08%
51st	—	—	—	Daryl Cowles (incumbent)	5,131	75.49%	Robert Mills IV (Mtn.)	1,666	24.51%	6,797	−3,465	−50.98%
52nd	Michael K. Roberts	4,114	45.17%	Craig Blair (incumbent)	4,994	54.83%	—	—	—	9,108	−880	−9.66%
53rd	—	—	—	Jonathan Miller (incumbent)	6,581	100.00%	—	—	—	6,581	−6,581	−100.00%
54th	—	—	—	Walter Duke (incumbent)	4,850	100.00%	—	—	—	4,850	−4,850	−100.00%
55th	—	—	—	John Overington (incumbent)	6,686	100.00%	—	—	—	6,686	−6,686	−100.00%
56th	Robert C. Tabb (incumbent)	6,635	100.00%	—	—	—	—	—	—	6,635	+6,635	+100.00%
57th	John Doyle (incumbent)	5,533	60.00%	Anne Dungan	3,689	40.00%	—	—	—	9,222	+1,844	+20.00%
58th	Tiffany Lawrence	4,953	57.78%	Tomas Engle	3,619	42.22%	—	—	—	8,572	+1,334	+15.56%

=== Multi-member districts ===
District	Seats	Democrats			Republicans			Others			Total
District	Seats	Candidate	Votes	%	Candidate	Votes	%	Candidate	Votes	%	Total
1st	2-seat	Randy Swartzmiller (incumbent)	8,763	40.03%	Pat McGeehan	8,443	38.57%	—	—	—	21,892
1st	2-seat	Benton Manypenny	4,686	21.41%	—	—	—	—	—	—	21,892
2nd	2-seat	Tim Ennis (incumbent)	10,078	54.29%	—	—	—	—	—	—	18,564
2nd	2-seat	Roy Givens	8,486	45.71%	—	—	—	—	—	—	18,564
3rd	2-seat	Orphy Klempa (incumbent)	9,236	40.14%	William N. Hefner (incumbent)	5,278	22.94%	—	—	—	23,009
3rd	2-seat	Tal Hutchins	8,495	36.92%	—	—	—	—	—	—	23,009
4th	2-seat	Scott G. Varner (incumbent)	8,689	36.27%	Ronald Morris	5,215	21.77%	Richard E. Hartley (Ind.)	3,102	12.95%	23,955
4th	2-seat	Michael Ferro	6,949	29.01%	—	—	—	—	—	—	23,955
10th	3-seat	Daniel Poling (incumbent)	10,086	17.49%	Tom Azinger (incumbent)	11,067	19.19%	—	—	—	57,662
10th	3-seat	Brenda K. Brum	10,077	17.48%	John Ellem (incumbent)	11,003	19.08%	—	—	—	57,662
10th	3-seat	Iris E. McCrady	6,389	11.08%	Fred D. Gillespie	9,040	15.68%	—	—	—	57,662
13th	2-seat	Brady Paxton (incumbent)	8,369	31.26%	James McCormick	5,986	22.36%	—	—	—	26,772
13th	2-seat	Dale F. Martin (incumbent)	6,855	25.61%	Brian Ray Scott	5,562	20.78%	—	—	—	26,772
14th	2-seat	Jeffrey Allen Martin	6,145	20.70%	Troy Andes (incumbent)	9,323	31.40%	—	—	—	29,691
14th	2-seat	Karen Coria	5,992	20.18%	Patti Schoen (incumbent)	8,231	27.72%	—	—	—	29,691
15th	3-seat	Kevin Craig (incumbent)	10,522	23.40%	Carol Miller (incumbent)	8,163	18.16%	—	—	—	44,958
15th	3-seat	Jim Morgan (incumbent)	9,387	20.88%	James R. Carden	5,150	11.46%	—	—	—	44,958
15th	3-seat	Carl L. Eastham	7,333	16.31%	Paula Stewart	4,403	9.79%	—	—	—	44,958
16th	3-seat	Doug Reynolds (incumbent)	12,462	27.39%	Kelli Sobonya (incumbent)	12,071	26.53%	—	—	—	45,491
16th	3-seat	Dale Stephens (incumbent)	11,482	25.24%	—	—	—	—	—	—	45,491
16th	3-seat	Amy Herrenkohl	9,476	20.83%	—	—	—	—	—	—	45,491
17th	2-seat	Rick Thompson (incumbent)	8,108	40.84%	Lisa Peana	4,624	23.29%	—	—	—	19,853
17th	2-seat	Don Perdue (incumbent)	7,121	35.87%	—	—	—	—	—	—	19,853
19th	4-seat	Greg Butcher	16,828	29.23%	—	—	—	—	—	—	57,566
19th	4-seat	Josh Stowers	13,846	24.05%	—	—	—	—	—	—	57,566
19th	4-seat	Jeff Eldridge (incumbent)	13,511	23.47%	—	—	—	—	—	—	57,566
19th	4-seat	Ralph Rodighiero (incumbent)	13,381	23.24%	—	—	—	—	—	—	57,566
22nd	2-seat	Linda Phillips	6,824	53.69%	—	—	—	—	—	—	12,711
22nd	2-seat	Daniel Hall	5,887	46.31%	—	—	—	—	—	—	12,711
25th	2-seat	John R. Frazier	6,664	28.85%	T. Mike Porter (incumbent)	6,539	28.31%	—	—	—	23,100
25th	2-seat	Marshall Long (incumbent)	6,070	26.28%	Joe C. Ellington Jr.	3,827	16.57%	—	—	—	23,100
27th	5-seat	Rick Moye (incumbent)	15,918	12.34%	Linda Sumner (incumbent)	17,218	13.35%	—	—	—	128,966
27th	5-seat	William R. Wooton	14,962	11.60%	Jeffrey Pack	11,313	8.77%	—	—	—	128,966
27th	5-seat	Sally Susman	14,894	11.55%	Dereck Severt	10,348	8.02%	—	—	—	128,966
27th	5-seat	Virginia Mahan (incumbent)	12,877	9.98%	Philip L. Stevens	9,874	7.66%	—	—	—	128,966
27th	5-seat	Louis Gall (incumbent)	12,415	9.63%	Albert K. Honaker	9,147	7.09%	—	—	—	128,966
28th	2-seat	Thomas Campbell (incumbent)	8,639	39.48%	Ray Canterbury (incumbent)	7,849	35.87%	—	—	—	21,881
28th	2-seat	Joan Connie Browning	5,393	24.65%	—	—	—	—	—	—	21,881
29th	3-seat	Tom Louisos	9,241	22.94%	Marshall Clay	4,746	11.78%	—	—	—	40,290
29th	3-seat	David Perry (incumbent)	9,227	22.90%	Daniel B. Wright	4,582	11.37%	—	—	—	40,290
29th	3-seat	Margaret Anne Staggers (incumbent)	9,185	22.80%	Steven O. Smith	3,309	8.21%	—	—	—	40,290
30th	7-seat	Doug Skaff	24,265	8.98%	Fred H. Joseph	18,653	6.90%	John A. Welbourn (Mtn.)	3,940	1.46%	270,160
30th	7-seat	Danny Wells (incumbent)	24,019	8.89%	John H. Miller Jr.	17,992	6.66%	—	—	—	270,160
30th	7-seat	Bonnie Brown (incumbent)	23,353	8.64%	Bud Anderson	16,217	6.00%	—	—	—	270,160
30th	7-seat	Barbara Hatfield (incumbent)	22,709	8.41%	Todd Carden	15,286	5.66%	—	—	—	270,160
30th	7-seat	Mark Hunt	21,635	8.01%	Victoria L. Casey	14,250	5.27%	—	—	—	270,160
30th	7-seat	Sharon Spencer (incumbent)	21,541	7.97%	Edward Burgess	13,282	4.92%	—	—	—	270,160
30th	7-seat	Nancy Peoples Guthrie (incumbent)	20,285	7.51%	Lance Vaughan	12,733	4.71%	—	—	—	270,160
32nd	3-seat	John William Cain Sr.	7,555	14.98%	Tim Armstead (incumbent)	10,958	21.73%	—	—	—	50,431
32nd	3-seat	Carmela Ryan-Thompson	7,513	14.90%	Ronald N. Walters (incumbent)	10,098	20.02%	—	—	—	50,431
32nd	3-seat	Charles Foster Black	5,450	10.81%	Patrick Lane (incumbent)	8,857	17.56%	—	—	—	50,431
37th	2-seat	Bill Proudfoot (incumbent)	9,978	51.59%	—	—	—	—	—	—	19,342
37th	2-seat	William G. Hartman (incumbent)	9,364	48.41%	—	—	—	—	—	—	19,342
41st	4-seat	Tim Miley (incumbent)	18,683	21.13%	Danny Hamrick	15,107	17.08%	—	—	—	88,436
41st	4-seat	Ron Fragale (incumbent)	18,482	20.90%	—	—	—	—	—	—	88,436
41st	4-seat	Sam Cann (incumbent)	18,310	20.70%	—	—	—	—	—	—	88,436
41st	4-seat	Richard Iaquinta (incumbent)	17,854	20.19%	—	—	—	—	—	—	88,436
43rd	3-seat	Mike Caputo (incumbent)	15,595	28.78%	Rick Starn	10,099	18.64%	—	—	—	54,184
43rd	3-seat	Linda Longstreth (incumbent)	14,567	26.88%	—	—	—	—	—	—	54,184
43rd	3-seat	Tim Manchin (incumbent)	13,923	25.70%	—	—	—	—	—	—	54,184
44th	4-seat	Alex Shook (incumbent)	17,867	19.76%	Cindy Frich	15,245	16.86%	—	—	—	90,404
44th	4-seat	Charlene Marshall (incumbent)	17,087	18.90%	Harry Bertram	7,976	8.82%	—	—	—	90,404
44th	4-seat	Bob Beach (incumbent)	16,168	17.88%	—	—	—	—	—	—	90,404
44th	4-seat	Barbara Fleischauer (incumbent)	16,061	17.77%	—	—	—	—	—	—	90,404

== Primary election results ==
Primary election results sourced from the West Virginia Secretary of State.

=== Democratic primaries ===
==== Single-member districts ====
District	Nominee			Runners-up						Total		
District	Candidate	Votes	%	Candidate	Votes	%	Candidate	Votes	%	Votes	Maj.	Mrg.
5th	Dave Pethtel (incumbent)	3,672	100.00%	—	—	—	—	—	—	3,672	+3,672	+100.00%
7th	Ron Nichols	2,132	100.00%	—	—	—	—	—	—	2,132	+2,132	+100.00%
8th	Charles T. Webb	2,124	100.00%	—	—	—	—	—	—	2,124	+2,124	+100.00%
9th	Jim Marion	1,246	45.78%	Sterling R. Ball	870	31.96%	Timothy P. Reed	606	22.26%	2,722	+376	+13.81%
12th	Jo Phillips	2,149	64.79%	Chadwick M. Slater	1,168	35.21%	—	—	—	3,317	+981	+29.57%
18th	Larry Barker (incumbent)	4,109	100.00%	—	—	—	—	—	—	4,109	+4,109	+100.00%
20th	Steven Kominar (incumbent)	4,428	100.00%	—	—	—	—	—	—	4,428	+4,428	+100.00%
21st	Harry Keith White (incumbent)	3,478	100.00%	—	—	—	—	—	—	3,478	+3,478	+100.00%
23rd	Clif Moore (incumbent)	2,357	56.23%	Emily W. Yeager	1,835	43.77%	—	—	—	4,192	+522	+12.45%
24th	Mike Vinciguerra Jr.	1,556	56.01%	Harold Wolfe III	935	33.66%	Edwin Ray Vanover	287	10.33%	2,778	+621	+22.35%
26th	Gerald Crosier (incumbent)	3,052	100.00%	—	—	—	—	—	—	3,052	+3,052	+100.00%
31st	Carrie Webster (incumbent)	1,701	51.78%	Meshea L. Poore	1,584	48.22%	—	—	—	3,285	+117	+3.56%
33rd	David Walker	1,238	30.60%	Ronald R. Blankenship	1,201	29.68%	3 others (Note: Rick W. Frame: 789 votes, 19.50%; Larry Dale Cottrell: 667 votes, 16.49%; Diann Clothier: 151 votes, 3.73%)	1,607	39.72%	4,046	+37	+0.91%
34th	Brent Boggs (incumbent)	4,504	100.00%	—	—	—	—	—	—	4,504	+4,504	+100.00%
35th	Sam Argento (incumbent)	3,641	100.00%	—	—	—	—	—	—	3,641	+3,641	+100.00%
36th	Joseph B. Talbott (incumbent)	2,239	55.32%	Mary Anne Carpenter	1,808	44.68%	—	—	—	4,047	+431	+10.65%
38th	Margaret Smith	1,498	45.00%	Kimberly Ann Harrison	848	25.47%	2 others (Note: Robert L. Stultz: 834 votes, 25.05%; Michael C. DeBarr: 149 votes, 4.48%)	983	29.53%	3,329	+650	+19.53%
40th	Mary Poling (incumbent)	2,943	100.00%	—	—	—	—	—	—	2,943	+2,943	+100.00%
42nd	Mike Manypenny	2,390	67.17%	Leroy G. Stanley	1,168	32.83%	—	—	—	3,558	+1,222	+34.35%
45th	Larry Williams (incumbent)	2,440	100.00%	—	—	—	—	—	—	2,440	+2,440	+100.00%
46th	Stanley Shaver (incumbent)	2,114	60.96%	David A. Cooper	1,354	39.04%	—	—	—	3,468	+760	+21.91%
47th	Harold Michael (incumbent)	3,561	71.09%	George Sponaugle III	1,448	28.91%	—	—	—	5,009	+2,113	+42.18%
48th	Donna Kuhn	1,528	100.00%	—	—	—	—	—	—	1,528	+1,528	+100.00%
50th	Royce Saville	1,416	50.30%	Alan M. Davis	1,399	49.70%	—	—	—	2,815	+17	+0.60%
48th	Michael K. Roberts	2,313	100.00%	—	—	—	—	—	—	2,313	+2,313	+100.00%
56th	Robert C. Tabb (incumbent)	2,524	100.00%	—	—	—	—	—	—	2,524	+2,524	+100.00%
57th	John Doyle (incumbent)	3,247	100.00%	—	—	—	—	—	—	3,247	+3,247	+100.00%
58th	Tiffany Lawrence	1,905	65.35%	Richard C. Watson	1,010	34.65%	—	—	—	2,915	+895	+30.70%

==== Multi-member districts ====
District	Seats	Nominees			Runners-up						Total
District	Seats	Candidate	Votes	%	Candidate	Votes	%	Candidate	Votes	%	Total
1st	2-seat	Randy Swartzmiller (incumbent)	5,090	45.86%	Tamara Diane Pettit	2,521	22.72%	—	—	—	11,098
1st	2-seat	Benton Manypenny	3,487	31.42%	—	—	—	—	—	—	11,098
2nd	2-seat	Tim Ennis (incumbent)	5,083	45.21%	Calvin Heck	2,764	24.58%	—	—	—	11,244
2nd	2-seat	Roy Givens	3,397	30.21%	—	—	—	—	—	—	11,244
3rd	2-seat	Orphy Klempa (incumbent)	4,754	51.53%	—	—	—	—	—	—	9,226
3rd	2-seat	Tal Hutchins	4,472	48.47%	—	—	—	—	—	—	9,226
4th	2-seat	Scott G. Varner (incumbent)	4,918	43.67%	Kenneth D. Tucker (incumbent)	2,585	22.95%	—	—	—	11,262
4th	2-seat	Michael Ferro	3,759	33.38%	—	—	—	—	—	—	11,262
10th	3-seat	Brenda K. Brum	5,329	32.55%	Timothy Allen Fittro	3,304	20.18%	—	—	—	16,374
10th	3-seat	Daniel Poling (incumbent)	4,437	27.10%	—	—	—	—	—	—	16,374
10th	3-seat	Iris E. McCrady (Note: Won after a tie-breaking coin toss)	3,304	20.18%	—	—	—	—	—	—	16,374
13th	2-seat	Brady Paxton (incumbent)	3,886	38.56%	Michael E. Whalen	2,857	28.35%	—	—	—	10,077
13th	2-seat	Dale F. Martin (incumbent)	3,334	33.09%	—	—	—	—	—	—	10,077
14th	2-seat	Jeffrey Allen Martin	3,725	50.43%	—	—	—	—	—	—	7,387
14th	2-seat	Karen Coria	3,662	49.57%	—	—	—	—	—	—	7,387
15th	3-seat	Jim Morgan (incumbent)	5,321	37.86%	—	—	—	—	—	—	14,055
15th	3-seat	Kevin Craig (incumbent)	5,179	36.85%	—	—	—	—	—	—	14,055
15th	3-seat	Carl L. Eastham	3,555	25.29%	—	—	—	—	—	—	14,055
16th	3-seat	Doug Reynolds (incumbent)	5,573	25.38%	Robert R. Nelson	3,806	17.33%	—	—	—	21,961
16th	3-seat	Dale Stephens (incumbent)	5,382	24.51%	Christopher L. Tatum	3,188	14.52%	—	—	—	21,961
16th	3-seat	Amy Herrenkohl	4,012	18.27%	—	—	—	—	—	—	21,961
17th	2-seat	Rick Thompson (incumbent)	6,087	53.92%	—	—	—	—	—	—	11,289
17th	2-seat	Don Perdue (incumbent)	5,202	46.08%	—	—	—	—	—	—	11,289
19th	4-seat	Ralph Rodighiero (incumbent)	7,151	14.10%	Ted Ellis (incumbent)	4,607	9.09%	Harry Ernest Freeman	3,149	6.21%	50,702
19th	4-seat	Josh Stowers	5,403	10.66%	Ted Tomblin	4,485	8.85%	Billy Ray Bryant	2,760	5.44%	50,702
19th	4-seat	Greg Butcher	5,357	10.57%	Lidella Wilson Hrutkay (incumbent)	3,931	7.75%	James M. Porter Jr.	2,407	4.75%	50,702
19th	4-seat	Jeff Eldridge (incumbent)	5,194	10.24%	Rupert W. Phillips Jr.	3,928	7.75%	Jeremy Elmer Farley	2,330	4.60%	50,702
22nd	2-seat	Linda Phillips	3,531	28.12%	Bruce Owen Williams	2,047	16.30%	Morgan Keith Davis	1,834	14.61%	12,556
22nd	2-seat	Daniel Hall	2,263	18.02%	Mike Burdiss (incumbent)	1,985	15.81%	Martey Owen Ashley	896	7.14%	12,556
25th	2-seat	John R. Frazier	4,437	46.04%	Lyle Wilton Cottle	1,090	11.31%	—	—	—	9,638
25th	2-seat	Marshall Long (incumbent)	4,111	42.65%	—	—	—	—	—	—	9,638
27th	5-seat	Sally Susman	9,401	15.19%	Albert Augustus Martine III	5,393	8.71%	—	—	—	61,896
27th	5-seat	William R. Wooton	9,271	14.98%	Michael Patrick Bates	4,704	7.60%	—	—	—	61,896
27th	5-seat	Rick Moye (incumbent)	7,941	12.83%	Jack Kelly Covey	4,336	7.01%	—	—	—	61,896
27th	5-seat	Virginia Mahan (incumbent)	7,397	11.95%	Kelley N. Sponaugle	3,755	6.07%	—	—	—	61,896
27th	5-seat	Louis Gall (incumbent)	6,363	10.28%	Andrew Joseph Moscarito Jr.	3,335	5.39%	—	—	—	61,896
28th	2-seat	Thomas Campbell (incumbent)	5,457	48.58%	Paul Stewart Detch	2,412	21.47%	—	—	—	11,233
28th	2-seat	Joan Connie Browning	3,364	29.95%	—	—	—	—	—	—	11,233
29th	3-seat	Margaret Anne Staggers (incumbent)	6,581	25.20%	John Pino (incumbent)	5,369	20.56%	—	—	—	26,116
29th	3-seat	David Perry (incumbent)	5,860	22.44%	William R. Sulesky	2,485	9.52%	—	—	—	26,116
29th	3-seat	Tom Louisos	5,821	22.29%	—	—	—	—	—	—	26,116
30th	7-seat	Danny Wells (incumbent)	13,530	10.98%	Barbara A. Lacy	5,854	4.75%	Timothy Patrick Cooper	3,350	2.72%	123,226
30th	7-seat	Barbara Hatfield (incumbent)	13,171	10.69%	Brenda Nichols Harper	5,449	4.42%	Cody Lee Britton	2,989	2.43%	123,226
30th	7-seat	Bonnie Brown (incumbent)	12,774	10.37%	Dave Higgins (incumbent)	5,356	4.35%	Roger A. Decanio	2,807	2.28%	123,226
30th	7-seat	Sharon Spencer (incumbent)	11,478	9.31%	Jeffrey Allen Wood	5,086	4.13%	—	—	—	123,226
30th	7-seat	Mark Hunt	10,512	8.53%	James Gordon Canterbury	4,414	3.58%	—	—	—	123,226
30th	7-seat	Doug Skaff	9,390	7.62%	Doris F. Rowe	4,209	3.42%	—	—	—	123,226
30th	7-seat	Nancy Peoples Guthrie (incumbent)	8,844	7.18%	Gerald R. Mollohan	4,013	3.26%	—	—	—	123,226
32nd	3-seat	John William Cain Sr.	3,886	27.78%	Clint Adison Casto	2,347	16.78%	—	—	—	13,989
32nd	3-seat	Carmela Ryan-Thompson	3,576	25.56%	Curtis G. Robinson Jr.	1,714	12.25%	—	—	—	13,989
32nd	3-seat	Charles Foster Black	2,466	17.63%	—	—	—	—	—	—	13,989
37th	2-seat	Bill Proudfoot (incumbent)	5,225	35.27%	Thomas Paul Ditty	2,812	18.98%	—	—	—	14,815
37th	2-seat	William G. Hartman (incumbent)	4,469	30.17%	Margaret Ann Beckwith	2,309	15.59%	—	—	—	14,815
41st	4-seat	Ron Fragale (incumbent)	10,003	22.49%	Anthony J. Barberio	6,192	13.92%	—	—	—	44,480
41st	4-seat	Tim Miley (incumbent)	9,870	22.19%	—	—	—	—	—	—	44,480
41st	4-seat	Richard Iaquinta (incumbent)	9,287	20.88%	—	—	—	—	—	—	44,480
41st	4-seat	Sam Cann (incumbent)	9,128	20.52%	—	—	—	—	—	—	44,480
43rd	3-seat	Mike Caputo (incumbent)	10,686	35.51%	—	—	—	—	—	—	30,095
43rd	3-seat	Linda Longstreth (incumbent)	9,800	32.56%	—	—	—	—	—	—	30,095
43rd	3-seat	Tim Manchin (incumbent)	9,609	31.93%	—	—	—	—	—	—	30,095
44th	4-seat	Charlene Marshall (incumbent)	9,531	25.04%	Steven Fumich	4,657	12.24%	—	—	—	38,062
44th	4-seat	Barbara Fleischauer (incumbent)	8,933	23.47%	—	—	—	—	—	—	38,062
44th	4-seat	Alex Shook (incumbent)	7,802	20.50%	—	—	—	—	—	—	38,062
44th	4-seat	Bob Beach (incumbent)	7,139	18.76%	—	—	—	—	—	—	38,062

=== Republican primaries ===
==== Single-member districts ====
District	Nominee			Runners-up						Total		
District	Candidate	Votes	%	Candidate	Votes	%	Candidate	Votes	%	Votes	Maj.	Mrg.
6th	William Romine (incumbent)	2,708	100.00%	—	—	—	—	—	—	2,708	+2,708	+100.00%
7th	Lynwood Ireland (incumbent)	2,231	100.00%	—	—	—	—	—	—	2,231	+2,231	+100.00%
8th	Bill Anderson (incumbent)	1,541	100.00%	—	—	—	—	—	—	1,541	+1,541	+100.00%
9th	Larry Border (incumbent)	1,070	60.01%	Sean D. Francisco	713	39.99%	—	—	—	1,783	+357	+20.02%
11th	Bob Ashley (incumbent)	1,513	100.00%	—	—	—	—	—	—	1,513	+1,513	+100.00%
12th	Mitch Carmichael (incumbent)	1,935	100.00%	—	—	—	—	—	—	1,935	+1,935	+100.00%
24th	John Shott	469	65.41%	Steven K. Mancini	101	14.09%	2 others (Note: Douglas C. Quesinberry: 78 votes, 10.88%; Blaine Allan Braithwaite: 69 votes, 9.62%)	147	20.50%	717	+368	+51.32%
34th	Larry M. Bright	521	100.00%	—	—	—	—	—	—	521	+521	+100.00%
38th	Derrick W. Love	678	40.24%	Claude M. Riffle	389	23.09%	2 others (Note: Bruce Beam: 329 votes, 19.53%; Steven M. Moneypenny: 289 votes, 17.15%)	618	36.68%	1,685	+289	+17.15%
39th	Bill Hamilton (incumbent)	2,233	80.88%	Jerry A. Reynolds	528	19.12%	—	—	—	2,761	+1,705	+61.75%
40th	Lonnie Moore Sr.	1,490	100.00%	—	—	—	—	—	—	1,490	+1,490	+100.00%
48th	Allen V. Evans (incumbent)	2,977	100.00%	—	—	—	—	—	—	2,977	+2,977	+100.00%
49th	Robert Schadler (incumbent)	1,714	100.00%	—	—	—	—	—	—	1,714	+1,714	+100.00%
50th	Ruth Rowan (incumbent)	1,144	100.00%	—	—	—	—	—	—	1,144	+1,144	+100.00%
51st	Daryl Cowles (incumbent)	1,778	100.00%	—	—	—	—	—	—	1,778	+1,778	+100.00%
52nd	Craig Blair (incumbent)	1,947	100.00%	—	—	—	—	—	—	1,947	+1,947	+100.00%
53rd	Jonathan Miller (incumbent)	1,693	100.00%	—	—	—	—	—	—	1,693	+1,693	+100.00%
54th	Walter Duke (incumbent)	1,076	100.00%	—	—	—	—	—	—	1,076	+1,076	+100.00%
55th	John Overington (incumbent)	1,514	100.00%	—	—	—	—	—	—	1,514	+1,514	+100.00%
57th	Anne Dungan	745	100.00%	—	—	—	—	—	—	745	+745	+100.00%

==== Multi-member districts ====
District	Seats	Nominees			Runners-up						Total
District	Seats	Candidate	Votes	%	Candidate	Votes	%	Candidate	Votes	%	Total
1st	2-seat	Pat McGeehan	1,621	100.00%	—	—	—	—	—	—	1,621
4th	2-seat	Ronald Morris	2,016	100.00%	—	—	—	—	—	—	2,016
10th	3-seat	Tom Azinger (incumbent)	3,109	23.85%	Gene A. Haynes	2,081	15.96%	Dennis S. Kimes	833	6.39%	13,035
10th	3-seat	John Ellem (incumbent)	2,969	22.78%	Edward T. Long	956	7.33%	—	—	—	13,035
10th	3-seat	Fred D. Gillespie	2,205	16.92%	William R. Bell	882	6.77%	—	—	—	13,035
13th	2-seat	James McCormick	1,661	39.30%	Brian C. Savilla	1,065	25.20%	—	—	—	4,227
13th	2-seat	Brian Ray Scott	1,501	35.51%	—	—	—	—	—	—	4,227
14th	2-seat	Troy Andes (incumbent)	2,337	52.15%	—	—	—	—	—	—	4,481
14th	2-seat	Patti Schoen (incumbent)	2,144	47.85%	—	—	—	—	—	—	4,481
15th	3-seat	Carol Miller (incumbent)	2,116	43.84%	—	—	—	—	—	—	4,827
15th	3-seat	James R. Carden	1,381	28.61%	—	—	—	—	—	—	4,827
15th	3-seat	Paula Stewart	1,330	27.55%	—	—	—	—	—	—	4,827
16th	3-seat	Kelli Sobonya (incumbent)	3,349	100.00%	—	—	—	—	—	—	3,349
17th	2-seat	Lisa Peana	1,264	100.00%	—	—	—	—	—	—	1,264
25th	2-seat	T. Mike Porter (incumbent)	1,319	63.57%	—	—	—	—	—	—	2,075
25th	2-seat	Joe C. Ellington Jr.	756	36.43%	—	—	—	—	—	—	2,075
27th	5-seat	Linda Sumner (incumbent)	3,155	25.45%	Gilbert W. Conner	1,367	11.03%	—	—	—	12,399
27th	5-seat	Dereck Severt	2,277	18.36%	—	—	—	—	—	—	12,399
27th	5-seat	Jeffrey Pack	2,131	17.19%	—	—	—	—	—	—	12,399
27th	5-seat	Albert K. Honaker	1,921	15.49%	—	—	—	—	—	—	12,399
27th	5-seat	Philip L. Stevens	1,548	12.48%	—	—	—	—	—	—	12,399
28th	2-seat	Ray Canterbury (incumbent)	1,817	100.00%	—	—	—	—	—	—	1,817
29th	3-seat	Marshall Clay	1,059	37.45%	—	—	—	—	—	—	2,828
29th	3-seat	Daniel B. Wright	938	33.17%	—	—	—	—	—	—	2,828
29th	3-seat	Steven O. Smith	831	29.38%	—	—	—	—	—	—	2,828
30th	7-seat	John H. Miller Jr.	4,121	15.25%	Elijah E. Young	2,741	10.15%	—	—	—	27,018
30th	7-seat	Fred H. Joseph	4,053	15.00%	—	—	—	—	—	—	27,018
30th	7-seat	Bud Anderson	3,872	14.33%	—	—	—	—	—	—	27,018
30th	7-seat	David T. Carden	3,489	12.91%	—	—	—	—	—	—	27,018
30th	7-seat	Lance B. Vaughan	3,072	11.37%	—	—	—	—	—	—	27,018
30th	7-seat	Victoria L. Casey	2,912	10.78%	—	—	—	—	—	—	27,018
30th	7-seat	Edward R. Burgess	2,758	10.21%	—	—	—	—	—	—	27,018
32nd	3-seat	Tim Armstead (incumbent)	2,791	36.75%	—	—	—	—	—	—	7,595
32nd	3-seat	Ronald N. Walters (incumbent)	2,457	32.35%	—	—	—	—	—	—	7,595
32nd	3-seat	Patrick Lane (incumbent)	2,347	30.90%	—	—	—	—	—	—	7,595
41st	4-seat	Danny Hamrick	3,810	100.00%	—	—	—	—	—	—	3,810
43rd	3-seat	Rick Starn	2,886	100.00%	—	—	—	—	—	—	2,886
44th	4-seat	Cindy Frich	3,110	62.83%	—	—	—	—	—	—	4,950
44th	4-seat	Harry Bertram	1,840	37.17%	—	—	—	—	—	—	4,950

=== Mountain primaries ===
==== Multi-member district ====
District	Seats	Nominee			Total
District	Seats	Candidate	Votes	%	Total
30th	7-seat	John A. Welbourn	21	100.00%	21

== See also ==
- List of West Virginia state legislatures
