= List of people from Clarksburg, West Virginia =

People from Clarksburg, West Virginia

This is a list of notable people who were born in, lived in, worked in, or otherwise have a documented connection to Clarksburg, West Virginia.

== Athletics ==
- Babe Barna – Major League Baseball player (1937–1943); born in Clarksburg
- Rex Bumgardner – professional football player for the Buffalo Bills and Cleveland Browns; born in Clarksburg
- Mike Carey – college basketball coach and longtime head coach of the West Virginia Mountaineers women's basketball team; from Clarksburg
- Jim Crutchfield – college basketball coach and two-time NCAA Division II national champion; from Clarksburg
- Jimbo Fisher – college football coach who led Florida State to the 2013 national championship; born in Clarksburg
- Pat Flaherty – football coach and two-time Super Bowl champion with the New York Giants; born in Clarksburg
- Bert Hamric – Major League Baseball player; born in Clarksburg
- Dave Jamerson – professional basketball player and first-round NBA draft pick; born in Clarksburg
- Tuffy Knight – Canadian university football coach and member of the Canadian Football Hall of Fame; born in Clarksburg
- Frank Loria – Virginia Tech All-American and College Football Hall of Fame inductee; born in Clarksburg
- Willis Moody – Negro league baseball player; born in Clarksburg and attended Kelly Miller High School
- Ken Moore – professional football player for the New York Giants; born in Clarksburg
- Rich Newbrough – Canadian university football coach; born and raised in Clarksburg
- John Rokisky – professional football player and 1946 AAFC champion; attended Washington Irving High School in Clarksburg
- Tommy "Franco" Thomas - American heavyweight boxer from Clarksburg, West Virginia

== Arts, architecture, and entertainment ==
- Julia Davis Adams – novelist and children's writer; born in Clarksburg
- Tony Anthony – actor, producer, director, and screenwriter
- Gray Barker – writer and publisher known for early UFO books; worked in Clarksburg for much of his career
- Phyllis Curtin – operatic soprano and music educator; born in Clarksburg
- William Demby – novelist; grew up in Clarksburg
- Frank Gaylord – sculptor best known for the soldiers of the Korean War Veterans Memorial; born in Clarksburg
- Ernest C. S. Holmboe – architect whose firm, Holmboe & Lafferty, was based in Clarksburg
- Pare Lorentz – documentary filmmaker known as "FDR's filmmaker"; born in Clarksburg
- Peter Marshall – actor, singer, and longtime host of Hollywood Squares; born in Clarksburg
- Bumps Myers – jazz saxophonist; born in Clarksburg
- Gloria Plevin – painter; raised in Clarksburg
- Melville Davisson Post – author of the Uncle Abner detective stories (1911–1928)
- Emily Shaffer – actress; born in Clarksburg
- Clyde Ware – screenwriter, director, and producer; born in Clarksburg
- Patty Weaver – actress known for The Young and the Restless and Days of Our Lives; born in Clarksburg
- Meredith Sue Willis – novelist and educator; born in Clarksburg
- Sherilyn Wolter – television actress; born in Clarksburg
- Kirsten Wyatt – Broadway actress; grew up in Clarksburg

== Journalism and broadcasting ==
- Hugh Aynesworth – author and journalist; born in Clarksburg
- Mike Patrick – longtime ESPN sportscaster; born and raised in Clarksburg
- Christi Paul – television journalist; began her broadcasting career at WDTV in Clarksburg
- Jay Randolph – sportscaster; began his broadcasting career in Clarksburg

== Politics, law, and government ==
- Percy Ashcraft – former Clarksburg city manager and West Virginia state delegate; later Virginia county administrator
- W. Robert Blair – Illinois politician
- Gideon D. Camden – judge and politician; early Clarksburg leader
- Sam Cann – former West Virginia state senator and delegate; born in Clarksburg
- Fred H. Caplan – justice of the Supreme Court of Appeals of West Virginia
- John S. Carlile – U.S. senator; prominent figure in the movement that created West Virginia
- William W. Chapman – politician in Iowa and Oregon
- John J. Davis – U.S. representative; helped establish West Virginia
- John W. Davis – Democratic Party nominee for president of the United States in 1924; born in Clarksburg
- Joseph S. Farland – U.S. ambassador to the Dominican Republic, Panama, Pakistan, and Iran; born in Clarksburg
- Ron Fragale – former member of the West Virginia House of Delegates; born in Clarksburg
- Guy D. Goff – U.S. senator; son of Nathan Goff Jr.
- Nathan Goff Jr. – U.S. senator, representative, secretary of the Navy, and federal judge; born in Clarksburg
- Howard Mason Gore – U.S. secretary of agriculture and governor of West Virginia
- Danny Hamrick – former member of the West Virginia House of Delegates; born in Clarksburg
- William S. Haymond – U.S. representative from Indiana and Union Army surgeon; born near Clarksburg
- Virgil L. Highland – banker, newspaper publisher, and Republican political figure based in Clarksburg.
- Lynn Hornor – U.S. representative from West Virginia; born in Clarksburg
- Edward B. Jackson – U.S. representative from Virginia
- John G. Jackson – U.S. representative and federal judge; prominent Clarksburg figure
- D. Rolland Jennings – West Virginia state delegate
- Louis A. Johnson – U.S. secretary of defense under President Harry S. Truman
- Irene Patricia Murphy Keeley – federal judge; practiced law in Clarksburg
- Patrick Lane – former member of the West Virginia House of Delegates; born in Clarksburg
- George Hay Lee – Virginia Court of Appeals judge; practiced law in Clarksburg
- Charles S. Lewis – U.S. representative
- Lloyd Lowndes Jr. – governor of Maryland and U.S. representative; born in Clarksburg
- Edwin Maxwell – West Virginia attorney general and Supreme Court justice; lived and practiced law in Clarksburg
- Haymond Maxwell – justice of the Supreme Court of Appeals of West Virginia; born and practiced law in Clarksburg
- JB McCuskey – West Virginia attorney general and former state auditor; born in Clarksburg
- John F. McCuskey – former justice of the Supreme Court of Appeals of West Virginia and state delegate; born and raised in Clarksburg
- Tim Miley – former speaker of the West Virginia House of Delegates
- Joseph M. Minard – former West Virginia state senator, delegate, and Senate clerk; born in Clarksburg
- Alan Mollohan – U.S. representative from West Virginia
- Elliott Northcott – U.S. diplomat and federal judge; born in Clarksburg
- Dave Nutter – member of the Virginia House of Delegates; born in Clarksburg
- Roy Earl Parrish – West Virginia politician
- James Pindall – U.S. representative from Virginia; practiced law in Clarksburg
- Ben Queen – West Virginia state senator and former state delegate; born in Clarksburg
- Stuart F. Reed – U.S. representative from West Virginia
- Mike Romano – former West Virginia state senator; born in Clarksburg
- Harry Clay Smith – Ohio state legislator, newspaper editor, and civil rights advocate; born in Clarksburg
- John Curtiss Underwood – federal judge and abolitionist; taught in Clarksburg for about two years
- Cyrus Vance – U.S. secretary of state under President Jimmy Carter; born in Clarksburg
- Bob Williams – former West Virginia state senator; born in Clarksburg
- Benjamin Wilson – U.S. representative; practiced law in Clarksburg

== Military ==
- Joe Bartlett – U.S. Marine Corps brigadier general and longtime U.S. House of Representatives official; born in Clarksburg
- Stonewall Jackson – Confederate lieutenant general during the American Civil War; born in Clarksburg
- William Lowther Jackson – Confederate general during the American Civil War; born in Clarksburg
- Emisire Shahan – Union Army soldier and Medal of Honor recipient; accredited to Clarksburg
- Sam Wetzel – U.S. Army lieutenant general; born in Clarksburg

== Religion, civil rights, and public service ==
- Mary Garard Andrews – Universalist minister and suffragist; born in Clarksburg
- Gordon Battelle – Methodist minister, educator, abolitionist, and West Virginia statehood leader; taught and served as a minister in Clarksburg
- Robert Graetz – Lutheran clergyman and civil rights activist; born in Clarksburg
- Mabel Grouitch – philanthropist and Red Cross volunteer nurse during World War I; born in Clarksburg

== Education and scholarship ==
- Martha Gandy Fales – art historian, museum curator, and author; born in Clarksburg
- Virginia Lacy Jones – librarian and library-school dean; spent much of her childhood in Clarksburg
- Victorine Louistall Monroe – educator and librarian; first Black woman to earn a graduate degree from West Virginia University; grew up and worked in Clarksburg
- Frederick Mosteller – statistician and founding chairman of Harvard University's statistics department; born in Clarksburg

== Business ==
- Porter Jarvis – president and chairman of Swift & Company; born in Clarksburg
- Clarence Moore – businessman and sportsman who died aboard the Titanic; born in Clarksburg
- Jean Yancey – entrepreneur, small-business consultant, and motivational speaker; born in Clarksburg
