= Ray Canterbury =

American politician (born 1969)

Member of the West Virginia House of Delegates from the 47th district
- Incumbent
- Assumed office December 1, 2024
- Preceded by: Todd Longanacre

Member of the West Virginia House of Delegates from the 42nd district
- In office January 12, 2013 – 2016
- Preceded by: Mike Manypenny

Member of the West Virginia House of Delegates from the 28th district
- In office January 2001 – January 2013 Serving with Thomas Campbell (2001-2013)
- Preceded by: Carroll Willis

Personal details
- Born: February 19, 1969 (age 57) Charleston, West Virginia, U.S.
- Party: Republican
- Education: University of Chicago; West Virginia University

Denny Ray Canterbury, Jr. (born February 19, 1969) is an American politician and a Republican member of the West Virginia House of Delegates representing District 47 since December 1, 2024. He previously represented District 42 from January 12, 2013 to 2016. Canterbury served consecutively from January 2001 until January 2013 in a District 28 seat.

== Education ==
Canterbury earned his BA from the University of Chicago and his MBA from West Virginia University.

== Elections ==
- 2012 Redistricted to District 42, Canterbury placed first in the three-way May 8, 2012 Republican Primary with 1,652 votes (54.7%), and placed first in the four-way two-position November 6, 2012 General election with 7,831 votes (32.7%) ahead of Republican nominee George Ambler and non-selectees Democratic nominees Steve Hunter (who had run in 2000 and 2002) and Glenn Singer.
- 1998 To challenge District 28 Democratic incumbent Representatives Thomas Campbell and Carroll Willis, Canterbury was unopposed for the 1998 Republican Primary but lost the three-way two-position November 3, 1998 General election to Representatives Campbell and Willis.
- 2000 When Representative Willis left the Legislature and left a district seat open, Canterbury was unopposed for the 2000 Republican Primary and was elected in the three-way two-position November 7, 2000 General election alongside Representative Campbell (D).
- 2002 Canterbury was unopposed for the 2002 Republican Primary and was re-elected in the three-way two-position November 5, 2002 General election alongside Representative Campbell (D).
- 2004 Canterbury was joined in the 2004 Republican Primary and was re-elected in the four-way two-position November 2, 2004 General election alongside Representative Campbell (D).
- 2006 Canterbury was joined in the 2006 Republican Primary and was re-elected in the four-way two-position November 7, 2006 General election alongside Representative Campbell (D).
- 2008 Canterbury was unopposed for the May 13, 2008 Republican Primary, winning with 1,817 votes, and placed second in the three-way two-position November 4, 2008 General election with 7,849 votes (35.9%) behind Representative Campbell and ahead of Democratic nominee Joan Browning.
- 2010 Canterbury was unopposed for the May 11, 2010 Republican Primary, winning with 1,209 votes, and placed first in the three-way two-position November 2, 2010 General election with 6,254 votes (40.0%) ahead of Representative Campbell (D) and Democratic nominee Michael Knisely.
