= Richard Iaquinta =

American politician (born 1946)

Member of the West Virginia House of Delegates from the 48th district
- In office 2016–2018
- Preceded by: Terry Waxman
- Succeeded by: Terry Waxman
- In office January 12, 2013 – 2014
- Preceded by: Allen V. Evans
- Succeeded by: Terry Waxman

Member of the West Virginia House of Delegates from the 41st district
- In office January 2003 – January 2013
- Preceded by: Frank Angotti
- Succeeded by: Adam R. Young

Personal details
- Born: August 10, 1946 (age 79) Clarksburg, West Virginia, U.S.
- Party: Democratic
- Education: Fairmont State College; West Virginia University

Military service
- Branch/service: United States Army; Military Police
- Years of service: 1969–1971
- Rank: Sergeant

Richard J. Iaquinta (born August 10, 1946) is an American politician who was a Democratic member of the West Virginia House of Delegates representing District 48 from January 12, 2013 to 2014 and again from 2016 to 2018. Iaquinta served consecutively from January 2003 until January 2013 in a District 41 seat.

== Education ==
Iaquinta earned his BS from Fairmont State College (now Fairmont State University) and his MSE from West Virginia University.

== Elections ==
- 2012 Redistricted to District 48, and with incumbent Allen V. Evans redistricted to District 54, Iaquinta placed third in the five-way May 8, 2012 Democratic Primary with 5,727 votes (22.4%), and placed second in the eight-way four-position November 6, 2012 General election with 12,633 votes (14.1%), behind incumbent Representative Tim Miley (D), and ahead of incumbent Sam Cann (D), Republican nominee Danny Hamrick (who had run in District 41 in 2006, 2008, and 2010), and unseating incumbent Representative Ron Fragale (D) and non-selectee Republican nominees Diana Bartley (who had run in 2010), Terry Woodside, and Ed Randolph.
- 2002 When District 41 incumbent Representative Frank Angotti left the Legislature and left a district seat open, Iaquinta placed in the nine-way 2002 Democratic Primary; the frontrunners were unopposed for the November 5, 2002 General election and Iaquinta was elected along with incumbents Sam Cann (D), Ron Fragale (D), and Bobbie Warner (D).
- 2004 Iaquinta placed in the six-way 2004 Democratic Primary ahead of displaced incumbent Warner, and was re-elected in the eight-way four-position November 2, 2004 General election with incumbents Cann (D) and Fragale (D), and Democratic nominee Tim Miley.
- 2006 Iaquinta and his fellow incumbents were challenged in the six-way 2006 Democratic Primary but all placed and were re-elected in the six-way four-position November 7, 2006 General election against Republican nominees Danny Hamrick and Jay Wolfe.
- 2008 Iaquinta placed third in the five-way May 13, 2008 Democratic Primary with 9,287 votes (20.9%), and placed fourth in the five-way four-position November 4, 2008 General election with 17,854 votes (20.2%) behind incumbents Miley (D), Fragale (D), and Cann (D) and ahead of returning 2006 Republican challenger Danny Hamrick.
- 2010 Iaquinta placed first in the six-way May 11, 2010 Democratic Primary with 5,949 votes (20.4%); former Representative Angotti was fifth. Iaquinta placed second in the eight-way four-position November 2, 2010 General election with 11,796 votes (15.0%) behind Representative Miley (D) and ahead of Representatives Cann (D) and Fragale (D) and Republican nominees Danny Hamrick, Laura Bartley, Edward Randolph, and William Griffith.

== Football ==
Iaquinta was the head football coach at Robert C. Byrd High School from 1996 to 2001, compiling a record of 45-20 over six seasons.
