= Overington =

Overington is an English surname. Notable people with the surname include:

- Caroline Overington (born 1970), Australian journalist and author
- John Overington (1946–2026), American politician
- Karen Overington (1941–2011), Australian politician
