= Daryl Cowles =

American politician

Speaker pro tempore of the West Virginia House of Delegates
- In office January 9, 2019 – November 30, 2020
- Preceded by: John Overington
- Succeeded by: Gary Howell

Majority Leader of the West Virginia House of Delegates
- In office January 14, 2015 – January 9, 2019
- Preceded by: Harry White
- Succeeded by: Amy Summers

Member of the West Virginia House of Delegates from the 58th district
- In office January 12, 2013 – November 30, 2020
- Preceded by: Tiffany Lawrence
- Succeeded by: George Miller

Member of the West Virginia House of Delegates from the 51st district
- In office January 2007 – January 2013
- Preceded by: Charles Trump
- Succeeded by: ???

Personal details
- Born: September 27, 1970 (age 55)
- Party: Republican
- Education: Valley College
- Website: Official website

Daryl Edward Cowles (born September 27, 1970) is an American politician and a Republican former member of the West Virginia House of Delegates representing District 58 from 2013 until his defeat in 2020. Cowles also served consecutively from January 2007 until January 2013 in the 51st District.

During his time in the Legislature, Cowles served as the first Republican Majority Leader in the House of Delegates after Republicans took control of the chamber for the first time in eight decades. Cowles later served as Speaker pro tempore.

After his defeat, Cowles was selected by Governor Jim Justice to be his representative for constituent services in the Eastern Panhandle. Cowles has also served as director of the Morgan County Economic Development Authority.

== Education ==
Cowles earned his AAS degree in business administration from Valley College.

== Elections ==
- 2020: Despite his prior service as Majority Leader and status as Speaker Pro Tempore, Cowles faced a competitive primary challenge from George Miller, a retired maintenance supervisor and owner of a home improvement business. Miller defeat Cowles by a narrow 52-48% margin.
- 2014: Cowles was re-elected to the 58th District, defeating Independent candidate Brenda Hutchinson. As the Republican Party gained control of the state House of Delegates, Cowles became the majority leader.
- 2012 Redistricted to District 58, and with incumbent Representative Tiffany Lawrence redistricted to District 65, Cowles was unopposed for both the May 8, 2012 Republican Primary with 1,450 votes, and the November 6, 2012 General election, winning with 5,699 votes.
- 2006 When District 51 Republican Representative Charles Trump retired and left the seat open, Cowles won the three-way 2006 Republican Primary and won the three-way November 7, 2006 General election against Democratic nominee Gary Nelson and Mountain Party candidate Robin Mills.
- 2008 Cowles and returning 2006 Mountain Party candidate Robin Mills were both unopposed, setting up a rematch; Cowles won the November 4, 2008 General election with 5,131 votes (75.5%) against Mills.
- 2010 Cowles was unopposed for the May 11, 2010 Republican Primary, winning with 945 votes, and won the November 2, 2010 General election with 4,030 votes (71.2%) against Democratic nominee Alton Wolfe.

West Virginia House of Delegates
Preceded by Harry White	Majority Leader of the West Virginia House of Delegates; 2015–2019	Succeeded by Amy Summers
Preceded by John Overington	Speaker pro tempore of the West Virginia House of Delegates; 2019–2020	Succeeded by Gary Howell
