= Danny Wells (politician) =

American politician (1940–2024)

Member of the West Virginia House of Delegates from the 36th district
- In office January 12, 2013 – 2014
- Preceded by: Joe Talbott

Member of the West Virginia House of Delegates from the 30th district
- In office January 2005 – January 2013
- Preceded by: Dan Foster
- Succeeded by: Linda Sumner

Personal details
- Born: March 15, 1940 Charleston, West Virginia, U.S.
- Died: May 21, 2024 (aged 84) Charleston, West Virginia, U.S.
- Party: Democratic
- Education: West Virginia University

Daniel Bundy Wells (March 15, 1940 – May 21, 2024) was an American politician and a Democratic member of the West Virginia House of Delegates representing District 36 since January 12, 2013. Wells served consecutively from January 2005 until January 2013 in a District 30 seat.

Wells died in Charleston, West Virginia, on May 21, 2024, at the age of 84.

== Education ==
Wells earned his BS in journalism from West Virginia University.

== Elections ==
- 2012 Redistricted to District 36 with fellow District 30 incumbent Representatives Nancy Guthrie and Mark Hunt, Wells placed first in the seven-way May 8, 2012, Democratic Primary with 2,878 votes (20.7%), and placed second in the six-way three-position November 6, 2012, General election with 9,212 votes (19.4%) behind Representative Hunt (D) and ahead of Representative Guthrie (D) and Republican nominees Robin Holstein, Stevie Thaxton, and Steve Sweeney.
- 2002 When District 30 Representative Joe F. Smith retired and left a district seat open, Wells ran in the nineteen-way 2002 Democratic Primary but failed to place; the frontrunners won the fourteen-way seven position November 5, 2002, General election including incumbents Jon Amores (D), Bonnie Brown (D), and Bobbie Hatfield (D), and nominees Ann Calvert (R) (who had run for the seat in 2000), Dan Foster (D), Corey Palumbo (D), Sharon Spencer (D), unseating Representative Ray Keener (D).
- 2004 When Representative Foster ran for West Virginia Senate and left a district seat open, Wells placed in the fourteen-way 2004 Democratic Primary and was elected in the fourteen-way seven-position November 2, 2004, General election which re-elected incumbent Representatives Amores (D), Brown (D), and Hatfield (D), Palumbo (D), and Spencer (D), fellow Democratic nominee Mark Hunt, and unseated Representative Calvert (R).
- 2006 When Representative Hunt took a hiatus from the Legislature and left a seat open, Wells placed in the eleven-way 2006 Democratic Primary and was re-elected in the fourteen-way seven-position November 7, 2006, General election alongside incumbent Democratic Representatives Amores (D), Hatfield (D), Spencer (D), Palumbo (D), Brown (D), and Democratic nominee Nancy Guthrie.
- 2008 When Representative Palumbo ran for West Virginia Senate and Representative Amores retired, leaving two district seats open, Wells placed first in the seventeen-way May 13, 2008, Democratic Primary with 13,530 votes (11.0%), and placed second in the fifteen-way seven-position November 4, 2008, General election with 24,019 votes (8.9%) along with Democratic nominee Doug Skaff and incumbent Representatives Brown (D), Hatfield (D), Hunt (D), Spencer (D), and Guthrie (D), all seven Republican nominees and Mountain Party candidate John Welbourn.
- 2010 Wells placed fourth in the thirteen-way May 11, 2010, Democratic Primary with 5,823 votes (11.2%), and placed third in the fourteen-way seven-position November 2, 2010, General election with 17,197 votes (7.8%) behind incumbent Representative Skaff (D), Republican nominee Eric Nelson, and ahead of incumbents Hatfield (D), Brown (D), Hunt (D), and Guthrie(D), unseated Representative Spencer (D) and the remaining Republican nominees.
