= John Overington =

American politician (1946–2026)

Speaker pro tempore of the West Virginia House of Delegates
- In office January 11, 2017 – January 9, 2019
- Preceded by: Bill Anderson
- Succeeded by: Daryl Cowles

Speaker of the West Virginia House of Delegates Acting
- In office August 21, 2018 – August 29, 2018
- Preceded by: Tim Armstead
- Succeeded by: Roger Hanshaw

Member of the West Virginia House of Delegates from the 62nd district
- In office January 12, 2013 – January 9, 2019
- Preceded by: Constituency established
- Succeeded by: Tom Bibby

Member of the West Virginia House of Delegates from the 55th district
- In office January 2003 – January 2013
- Preceded by: John Doyle
- Succeeded by: Isaac Sponaugle

Member of the West Virginia House of Delegates from the 54th district
- In office January 1985 – January 2003
- Preceded by: ??
- Succeeded by: Walter Duke

Personal details
- Born: June 5, 1946 Laurel, Maryland, U.S.
- Died: January 27, 2026 (aged 79)
- Party: Republican
- Education: Washington College (BS); George Washington University
- Website: Official website

John Overington (June 5, 1946 – January 27, 2026) was an American politician who was a Republican member of the West Virginia House of Delegates, representing District 62 from January 1999. Overington served consecutively from January 1985 until January 2003 and from January 2003 until January 2013 in the District 54 and District 55 seats.

== Education ==
Overington earned his BS in chemistry from Washington College with graduate studies in philosophy at George Washington University.

== Death ==
Overington died on January 27, 2026, at the age of 79.

== Elections ==
- 1980s and early 1990s Overington was initially elected in the 1984 Republican Primary and the November 6, 1984, general election and was re-elected in the general elections of November 8, 1988, November 6, 1990, November 3, 1992, November 8, 1994, and November 5, 1996.
- 1998 Overington was unopposed for the 1998 Republican Primary and won the November 3, 1998, general election against Democratic nominee Laura Rose.
- 2000 Overington and returning 1998 Democratic challenger Laura Rose were both challenged in their 2000 primaries, but won, setting up a rematch; Overington won the November 7, 2000, general election against Rose.
- 2002 Redistricted to District 55, and with incumbent Representative John Doyle redistricted to District 57, Overington was unopposed for the 2002 Republican Primary and won the November 5, 2002, general election against Mountain Party candidate Vince George.
- 2004 Overington was unopposed for both the 2004 Republican Primary and the November 2, 2004, general election.
- 2006 Overington was unopposed for both the 2006 Republican Primary and the November 7, 2006, general election.
- 2008 Overington was unopposed for both the May 13, 2008, Republican Primary, winning with 1,514 votes, and the November 4, 2008, general election, winning with 6,686 votes.
- 2010 Overington was unopposed for the May 11, 2010, Republican Primary, winning with 652 votes, and won the November 2, 2010, general election with 3,648 votes (60.6%) against Democratic nominee Donn Marshall.
- 2012: Redistricted to District 62, Overington was unopposed for both the May 8, 2012, Republican Primary, winning with 848 votes, and the November 6, 2012, general election, winning with 5,024 votes.
- 2014: Overington won re-election to the 62nd District, defeating opponent Democrat Kris Loken.
- 2016: Overington was once again elected to the House, defeating Democratic challenger Christy Santana by a wide margin.

West Virginia House of Delegates
Preceded by Bill Anderson	Speaker pro tempore of the West Virginia House of Delegates; 2017–2019	Succeeded by Daryl Cowles
Preceded by Tim Armstead	Speaker of the West Virginia House of Delegates; Acting; 2018	Succeeded by Roger Hanshaw
