= Gary Howell (West Virginia politician) =

American politician

Speaker pro tempore of the West Virginia House of Delegates
- In office December 1, 2020 – January 11, 2023
- Preceded by: Daryl Cowles
- Succeeded by: Paul Espinosa

Member of the West Virginia House of Delegates
- Incumbent
- Assumed office December 1, 2010
- Preceded by: Robert Schadler
- Constituency: 49th district (2010–2012); 56th district (2012–2022); 87th district (2022–present)

Personal details
- Born: November 1, 1966 (age 59) Cumberland, Maryland, U.S.
- Party: Republican
- Spouse: Kristen Kay Howell
- Parent(s): Glenn and Gloria Howell
- Education: Keyser High School Potomac State College; Frostburg State University (BS)

Gary Howell (born November 1, 1966) is an American politician and businessman from West Virginia. He is currently a member of the West Virginia House of Delegates for the 56th district and chairman of the Mineral County Republican Executive Committee.

== Biography ==
Howell has lived his entire life in Keyser, West Virginia.

He has worked extensively in the motorsports industry. He has raced both stock cars and drag cars, built winning race cars, built award winning show cars, and designed racing parts. His media skills include hosting and writing a syndicated radio show, freelance writing automotive magazine articles, and guest appearances as technical expert on automotive TV shows.

In addition to working in the automotive field, he is an advocate for small business and consumers fighting against credit card fraud and for the reform of credit card laws in the US.

Before his election to the House of Delegates 49th District in 2010, Howell had unsuccessfully run for the Mineral County Commission in 2006, losing to incumbent Cynthia L. Pyles, and for a seat in the West Virginia Senate in 2008, losing to Robert Williams.

After re-election in 2012 to the House of Delegates 56th District, Howell was named Minority Chairman of the major committee Government Organization.

In November 2013, Howell was named the national chairman of the State Automotive Enthusiast Leadership Caucus. The caucus is a bipartisan group of state lawmakers made up of close to 600 legislators from all 50 states.

=== Education ===
Howell graduated from Keyser High School, attended Potomac State College and Frostburg State University in Frostburg, Maryland, graduating in 1990.

== Introduced legislation ==
=== Intrastate Coal and Use Act ===
In protest of the Environmental Protection Agency allegedly overstepping its authority by interfering with intrastate commerce, the West Virginia Intrastate Coal and Use Act (H.B. 2554) was introduced into the West Virginia House of Delegates by Howell. The bill states that coal sold and used within the borders of West Virginia is not subject to EPA authority because no interstate commerce exist and the state retains the rights to control its own intrastate commerce under the 10th Amendment.

== Awards ==
2005 Car and Driver Supercar Challenge-winning Dodge SRT-4 built by Howell

- 2006 Named one of West Virginia's "Generation Next:40 under 40" by the State Journal
- Was selected "West Virginia Exporter of the Year" by the Small Business Administration in 2003.
- Built the winning car in the 2005 Car and Driver Supercar Challenge
- 2021 Presented with a Life Time Achievement award by the SEMA (association) Action Network for his work with the State Automotive Enthusiast Leadership Caucus

West Virginia House of Delegates
Preceded by Daryl Cowles	Speaker pro tempore of the West Virginia House of Delegates; 2020–2023	Succeeded by Paul Espinosa
