= Sam Cann =

American politician (born 1954)

Member of the West Virginia Senate from the 12th district
- In office January 16, 2013 – December 1, 2014
- Preceded by: Joseph M. Minard
- Succeeded by: Mike Romano

Member of the West Virginia House of Delegates from the 48th district
- In office December 1, 2012 – January 16, 2013
- Preceded by: Allen V. Evans
- Succeeded by: Ron Fragale

Member of the West Virginia House of Delegates from the 41st district
- In office December 1, 1994 – December 1, 2012
- Succeeded by: Adam R. Young

Personal details
- Born: January 26, 1954 (age 72) Clarksburg, West Virginia, U.S.
- Party: Democratic
- Spouse: Phyllis Mazza
- Children: Sarah; Sammy Joe; Rebekah; Julia; Laura
- Education: West Virginia University (B.A., M.S.)

Samuel Joseph Cann, Sr. (born January 26, 1954) is an American politician and a former Democratic member of the West Virginia Senate representing District 12 from his January 16, 2013 appointment by West Virginia Governor Earl Ray Tomblin to fill the vacancy caused by the resignation of Senator Joseph M. Minard to 2014. Cann served consecutively in the West Virginia Legislature from December 1, 1994 until January 16, 2013 in the West Virginia House of Delegates in the District 41 and District 48 seats.

== Education ==
Cann earned his BA and MS degrees from West Virginia University.

== Elections ==
- 2012 Redistricted to District 48, and with incumbent Allen V. Evans redistricted to District 54, Cann placed fourth in the five-way May 8, 2012 Democratic Primary with 5,233 votes (20.5%), and third in the eight-way four-position November 6, 2012 General election with 12,302 votes (14.1%), behind incumbent Representatives Tim Miley (D) and Richard Iaquinta (D), and ahead of Republican nominee Danny Hamrick (who had run in District 41 in 2006, 2008, and 2010), and unseating incumbent Representative Ron Fragale (D) and non-selectee Republican nominees Diana Bartley (who had run in 2010), Terry Woodside, and Ed Randolph.
- 1990s Cann was initially elected to the District 41 seat in the 1994 Democratic Primary and November 8, 1994 General election and re-elected in the general election of November 5, 1996.
- 1998 Cann placed in the eight-way 1998 Democratic Primary and was re-elected on the November 3, 1998 General election along with incumbent Representatives Larry Linch (D) and Bobbie Warner (D) and Democratic nominee Frank Angotti.
- 2000 Cann placed in the nine-way 2000 Democratic Primary which displaced Representative Linch; the frontrunners were unopposed for the November 7, 2000 General election and Cann was re-elected along with incumbents Warner (D) and Angotti (D) and Democratic nominee Ron Fragale.
- 2002 When District 41 incumbent Representative Angotti left the Legislature and left a district seat open, Cann placed in the nine-way 2002 Democratic Primary; the frontrunners were unopposed for the November 5, 2002 General election and Cann was re-elected along with incumbents Warner (D), Fragale (D), and Democratic nominee Richard Iaquinta.
- 2004 Cann placed in the six-way 2004 Democratic Primary ahead of displaced Representative Warner, and was re-elected in the eight-way four-position November 2, 2004 General election with incumbents Fragale (D) and Iaquinta (D) and Democratic nominee Tim Miley.
- 2006 Cann and his fellow incumbents were challenged in the six-way 2006 Democratic Primary but all placed and were re-elected in the six-way four-position November 7, 2006 General election against Republican nominees Danny Hamrick and Jay Wolfe.
- 2008 Cann placed fourth in the five-way May 13, 2008 Democratic Primary with 9,128 votes (20.9%), and placed third in the five-way four-position November 4, 2008 General election with 17,854 votes (20.2%) behind incumbents Miley (D), Fragale (D), and ahead of incumbent Fragale (D) and returning 2006 Republican challenger Danny Hamrick.
- 2010 Cann placed fourth in the six-way May 11, 2010 Democratic Primary with 5,155 votes (17.6%); former Representative Angotti was fifth. Cann placed third in the eight-way four-position November 2, 2010 General election with 11,516 votes (14.6%) behind Representatives Miley (D) and Iaquinta (D) and ahead of Representative Fragale (D) and Republican nominees Danny Hamrick, Laura Bartley, Edward Randolph, and William Griffith.
