= Eric Householder =

American politician (born 1968)

Majority Leader of the West Virginia House of Delegates
- In office January 11, 2023 – January 8, 2025
- Preceded by: Amy Summers
- Succeeded by: Pat McGeehan

Member of the West Virginia House of Delegates
- In office December 1, 2010 – December 1, 2024
- Preceded by: Bob Tabb
- Constituency: 56th district (2010–2012); 64th district (2012–2022); 96th district (2022–2024)

Personal details
- Born: June 5, 1968 (age 58) Baltimore, Maryland, U.S.
- Party: Republican
- Education: Shepherd University (BS); Frostburg State University (MBA)
- Website: Official website

Eric L. Householder (born June 5, 1968) is an American politician who was a Republican member of the West Virginia House of Delegates from 2010 to 2024. Householder served consecutively from January 2011 until January 2013 in the District 56 seat. He started representing District 64 on January 12, 2013.

== Education ==
Householder earned his BS in economics from Shepherd College (now Shepherd University) and his MBA from Frostburg State University.

== Elections ==
- 2010: When District 56 Democratic Representative Bob Tabb left the Legislature and left the seat open, Householder was unopposed for the May 11, 2010 Republican Primary, winning with 494 votes, and won the November 2, 2010 General election with 3,322 votes (56.4%) against Democratic nominee Terry Walker.
- 2012: Redistricted to District 64, Householder was unopposed for both the May 8, 2012 Republican Primary, winning with 888 votes, and the November 6, 2012 General election, winning with 4,882 votes.
- 2014: Householder won his third term in the House, as he was unopposed on the ballot for the 64th District.
- 2016: Householder was elected to the House for a fourth time, defeating Democratic challenger Barbara "Barby" Frankenberry.

West Virginia House of Delegates
| Preceded by Amy Summers | Majority Leader of the West Virginia House of Delegates; 2023–2025 | Succeeded by Pat McGeehan |
