= Sammi Brown =

American politician

Member of the West Virginia House of Delegates from the 65th district
- In office November 30, 2018 – December 1, 2020
- Preceded by: Jill Upson
- Succeeded by: Wayne Clark

Personal details
- Born: December 21, 1984 (age 41) Charles Town, West Virginia, U.S.
- Party: Democratic
- Education: Shepherd University (BA, MBA)

Sammi Brown (born December 21, 1984) is an American politician and labor organizer who served as a member of the West Virginia House of Delegates for the 65th district from December 1, 2018, to November 30, 2020.

== Early life and education ==
Brown was born and raised in Charles Town, West Virginia. She earned a Bachelor of Arts degree in mass communication and a Master of Business Administration in marketing from Shepherd University.

== Career ==
From 2009 to 2014, Brown worked in production and public relations for several and television and radio stations, including WDVM-TV, WSHC, and WIHT. In 2014, she became a campaign coordinator for the West Virginia chapter of the AFL–CIO. From 2016 to 2017, she was the director of marketing and communications at Geostellar, a solar energy company. In 2017 and 2018, she was the federal campaigns director for the West Virginia Healthy Kids and Families Coalition. She has also worked as a trainer for the National Democratic Training Committee.

In 2016, Brown ran unsuccessfully for a seat in the West Virginia House of Delegates. She rain again in 2018 defeating incumbent Jill Upson, and assumed office on November 30, 2018. In her 2020 re-election campaign, Brown was narrowly defeated by Republican nominee Wayne Clark.
