= Jill Upson =

American politician

Jill S. Upson

Executive Director of the West Virginia Herbert Henderson Office of Minority Affairs
- Incumbent
- Assumed office 2019
- Governor: Jim Justice

Member of the West Virginia House of Delegates from the 65th district
- In office 2015–2019
- Preceded by: Tiffany Lawrence
- Succeeded by: Sammi Brown

Personal details
- Party: Republican
- Education: Shepherd University (BS)

Jill Upson is a former Republican Delegate of the West Virginia House of Delegates, representing the 65th district, which includes Jefferson County, West Virginia. Upson was the first black Republican woman elected to the West Virginia House of Delegates.

== Education ==
Upson earned a Bachelor of Science degree in business administration from Shepherd University.

== Career ==
In 2012, Upson challenged incumbent Delegate Tiffany Lawrence and lost by four percent. In the 2014 election, Upson defeated Lawrence in a rematch. Upson won the 2014 election 56 to 44 percent. GOPAC, the national Republican political action committee, contributed over $20,000 to Upson's 2014 campaign.

In 2016, Upson won re-election over Democratic challenger Sammi Brown. In 2018, Upson was defeated by Brown.

Since leaving office, Upson has served as the executive director of the West Virginia Herbert Henderson Office of Minority Affairs.

== Personal life ==
She is married to Kelvin Upson, who served in the United States Navy. She has one son and had one daughter.
