= Isaac Sponaugle =

American politician

Member of the West Virginia House of Delegates from the 55th district
- In office January 2013 – 2020
- Preceded by: John Overington
- Succeeded by: Bryan Ward

Personal details
- Born: George Isaac Sponaugle; March 24, 1979 (age 47) Harrisonburg, Virginia, U.S.
- Party: Democratic
- Education: West Virginia University (BS, JD)

Isaac Sponaugle is an American attorney and former member of the West Virginia House of Delegates, representing the 55th District from 2013 till 2020. Sponaugle served as an intern to Senator Robert Byrd. Sponaugle gave up his seat to be a candidate for the Democratic nomination to be West Virginia's Attorney General in 2020 and lost the race by just 145 votes, but he conceded without any request for a recount, hoping to unify his party behind nominee Sam Petsonk in order to defeat Patrick Morrisey, the Republican incumbent.
