= Amy Summers =

American politician

Majority Leader of the West Virginia House of Delegates
- In office January 9, 2019 – January 11, 2023
- Preceded by: Daryl Cowles
- Succeeded by: Eric Householder

Member of the West Virginia House of Delegates from the 73rd district
- In office December 1, 2022 – December 1, 2024
- Succeeded by: Bryan Smith

Member of the West Virginia House of Delegates from the 49th district
- In office January 14, 2015 – 2022
- Preceded by: Mike Manypenny
- Succeeded by: Heather Tully

Personal details
- Born: May 3, 1963 (age 63) Grafton, West Virginia, U.S.
- Party: Republican
- Education: West Virginia University, Morgantown (BS); Western Governors University (MS)

Amy Summers (born May 3, 1963) is an American politician who served in the West Virginia House of Delegates from 2014 to 2024.

== Early life and education ==
Summers was born on May 3, 1963, to parents Paul and Nel Elder. She graduated from West Virginia University with her Bachelor of Science degree and completed her Master's degree in Nursing, Leadership and Management from Western Governors University.

West Virginia House of Delegates
Preceded by Daryl Cowles	Majority Leader of the West Virginia House of Delegates; 2019–2023	Succeeded by Eric Householder
