= Jeff Eldridge =

American politician (born 1967)

Member of the West Virginia House of Delegates from the 30th district
- Incumbent
- Assumed office December 1, 2024
- Preceded by: David Adkins

Member of the West Virginia House of Delegates from the 22nd district
- In office January 12, 2013 – 2018
- Succeeded by: Joe Jeffries

Member of the West Virginia House of Delegates from the 19th district
- In office January 2005 – January 2011
- Preceded by: Bill Wright
- Succeeded by: Rupert Phillips

Personal details
- Born: January 13, 1967 (age 59) Xenia, Ohio, U.S.
- Party: Republican
- Education: Marshall University

Jeffrey Allen Eldridge (born January 13, 1967) is an American politician and a Republican member of the West Virginia House of Delegates representing District 30 since 2024. He represented District 22 from January 12, 2013 to 2018 as a Democrat. Eldridge served non-consecutively from January 2005 until January 2011 in the District 19 seat.

== Education ==
Eldridge earned his BA in education and other degrees from Marshall University.

== Elections ==
- 2012 Redistricted to District 22 alongside Democratic incumbent Representative Josh Stowers, Eldridge ran in the six-way May 8, 2012, Democratic primary and placed second with 2,348 votes (29.3%), and placed second in the four-way two-position November 6, 2012, general election with 5,262 votes (26.3%), behind Representative Stowers and ahead of Republican nominees Michel Moffatt and Gary Johngrass.
- 2002 Initially in District 19, Eldridge ran in the seven-way 2002 Democratic primary but lost; the four frontrunners won the eight-way four-position November 5, 2002, general election.
- 2004 Eldridge placed in the ten-way 2004 Democratic primary ahead of incumbent representative Bill Wright; Eldridge and the other three incumbent won the eight-way four-position November 2, 2004, general election.
- 2006 Eldridge placed in the twelve-way 2006 Democratic primary; the four frontrunners won the seven-way four-position November 7, 2006, general election.
- 2008 Eldridge ran in the twelve-way May 13, 2008, Democratic primary, placing fourth with 5,194 votes (10.2%); they were unopposed in the four-position November 4, 2008, general election, where Eldridge placed third with 13,511 votes (23.5%).
- 2010 Eldridge challenged Senate District 7 appointed Democratic senator Ron Stollings in the May 11, 2010, Democratic primary, but lost to Senator Stollings, who was unopposed for the November 2, 2010, general election and was elected to the remainder of the term.
