= Terry Waxman =

American politician

Member of the West Virginia House of Delegates from the 48th district
- In office December 1, 2018 – December 1, 2020
- Preceded by: Richard Iaquinta
- In office December 1, 2014 – December 1, 2016
- Preceded by: Richard Iaquinta
- Succeeded by: Richard Iaquinta

Personal details
- Born: December 28, 1956 (age 69) Illinois
- Party: Republican

Terry Waxman (born December 28, 1956) is an American politician who served in the West Virginia House of Delegates, representing the 48th district from 2014 to 2016 and again from 2018 to 2020.
