= Nancy Peoples Guthrie =

American politician (born 1952)

Member of the West Virginia House of Delegates
- In office December 1, 2006 – December 1, 2016
- Constituency: 30th district (2006–2012); 36th district (2012–2016)

Personal details
- Born: Nancy Lee Peoples Guthrie; June 15, 1952 (age 74) Havre de Grace, Maryland, U.S.
- Party: Democratic
- Spouse: George G. Guthrie
- Education: Pennsylvania State University

Nancy Lee Peoples Guthrie (born June 15, 1952) is an American politician who was a Democratic member of the West Virginia House of Delegates representing the 36th district from December 1, 2012, to December 1, 2016. Between 2006 and 2012, Guthrie represented the seven-member 30th district.

== Education ==
Guthrie attended the Pennsylvania State University.

== Elections ==
- 2012 — Redistricted to District 36 with fellow District 30 incumbent Representatives Danny Wells and Mark Hunt, Guthrie placed third in the seven-way May 8, 2012 Democratic Primary with 2,825 votes (20.3%), and placed third in the six-way three-position November 6, 2012 General election with 8,777 votes (18.5%) behind Representatives Hunt (D) and Wells (D), and ahead of Republican nominees Robin Holstein, Stevie Thaxton, and Steve Sweeney.
- 2006 — When District 30 Democratic Representative Hunt took a hiatus from the Legislature and left a seat open, Guthrie placed in the eleven-way 2006 Democratic Primary and was elected in the fourteen-way seven-position November 7, 2006 General election alongside incumbent Democratic representatives John Amores, Bobbie Hatfield, Sharon Spencer, Corey Palumbo, Bonnie Brown, and Danny Wells.
- 2008 — When Representative Palumbo ran for West Virginia Senate and Representative Amores retired, leaving two district seats open, Guthrie placed seventh in the seventeen-way May 13, 2008 Democratic Primary with 8,844 votes (7.2%), and placed seventh in the fifteen-way seven-position November 4, 2008 General election with 20,285 votes (7.5%) along with Democratic nominee Doug Skaff ahead of all seven Republican nominees and Mountain Party candidate John Welbourn.
- 2010 — Guthrie placed seventh in the thirteen-way May 11, 2010 Democratic Primary with 4,934 votes (9.5%), and placed seventh in the fourteen-way November 2, 2010 General election with 16,301 votes (7.4%) behind Republican nominee Eric Nelson, and ahead of unseated Representative Spencer and the remaining Republican nominees.
