= Dale Stephens (politician) =

American politician

Member of the West Virginia House of Delegates from the 17th district
- In office January 12, 2013 – 2014

Member of the West Virginia House of Delegates from the 16th district
- In office January 2005 – January 2013
- Preceded by: Jody Smirl

Member of the West Virginia House of Delegates from the 16th district
- In office January 2001 – January 2003
- Preceded by: Evan Jenkins

Personal details
- Born: November 23, 1959 (age 66) Huntington, West Virginia, U.S.
- Party: Democratic
- Education: Marshall University

Dale G. Stephens (born November 23, 1959) is an American politician who was a Democratic member of the West Virginia House of Delegates representing District 17 from January 12, 2013 to 2014. Stephens served consecutively from January 2005 until January 2013 and non-consecutively from January 2001 until January 2003 in a District 16 seat.

== Education ==
Stephens earned his BS from Marshall University.

== Elections ==
- 2012 Redistricted to District 17 along with fellow District 16 Representative Doug Reynolds, Stephens placed first in the three-way May 8, 2012 Democratic Primary with 2,280 votes (43.1%), and placed second in the four-way two-position November 6, 2012 General election with 6,559 votes (30.0%) behind Representative Stephens (D) and ahead of Republican nominees Michael Ankrom and Joyce Holland.
- 2000 When Representative Evan Jenkins ran for West Virginia Senate and left a district seat open, Stephens placed in the four-way 2000 Democratic Primary and was elected in the five-way three-position November 7, 2000 General election with incumbent Representatives Susan Hubbard (D) and Jody Smirl (R).
- 2002 Stephens placed in the seven-way 2002 Democratic Primary but lost the six-way three-position November 5, 2002 General election which re-elected Representative Smirl (R) and Republican nominees Greg Howard and Kelli Sobonya, unseating Representatives Hubbard (D) and Stephens (D).
- 2004 When Representative Smirl left the Legislature and left a district seat open, Stephens placed in the six-way 2004 Democratic Primary, and was re-elected in the six-way three-position November 2, 2004 General election with incumbents Howard (R) and Sobonya (R).
- 2006 Stephens placed in the four-way 2006 Democratic Primary and was elected in the six-way three-position November 7, 2006 General election along with incumbent Representatives Sobonya (R) and fellow Democratic nominee Doug Reynolds, and unseating Representative Howard (R).
- 2008 Stephens placed second in the five-way May 13, 2008 Democratic Primary with 5,382 votes (24.5%), and placed third in the four-way three-position November 4, 2008 General election with 11,482 votes (25.2%) behind of Representatives Reynolds (D) and Sobonya (R) and ahead of Democratic nominee Amy Herrenkohl.
- 2010 Stephens and Representative Reynolds were unopposed for the May 11, 2010 Democratic Primary where Stephens placed first with 3,292 votes (52.8%); and placed third in the four-way three-position November 2, 2010 General election with 8,074 votes (24.0%) behind Representatives Sobonya (R) and Reynolds (D), and ahead of Republican nominee Tomma Anne See.
