= Ray Keener =

American academic and politician (1956–2026)

Member of the West Virginia House of Delegates
- In office 2000–2002

Personal details
- Born: Raymond Keener III; June 27, 1956 Charleston, West Virginia, U.S.
- Died: June 27, 2026 (aged 70)
- Party: Democratic
- Spouse: Susan Thompson
- Education: West Virginia University; West Virginia University College of Law; Georgetown University Law Center
- Occupation: Academic

Raymond Keener III (June 27, 1956 – June 27, 2026) was an American academic and politician. A member of the Democratic Party, he served in the West Virginia House of Delegates from 2000 to 2002.

== Early life and career ==
Keener was born in Charleston, West Virginia, on June 27, 1956, the son of Raymond Keener Jr. and Mary Agnes Dennie. He attended West Virginia University, earning his BSBA degree in accounting in 1979. He also attended West Virginia University College of Law, graduating in 1982. After graduating, he worked at the West Virginia State Tax Department, and the West Virginia Public Service Commission. He attended Georgetown University Law Center, earning his LLM degree in taxation in 1990.

Keener served in the West Virginia House of Delegates from 2000 to 2002. After his service in the House, he worked as an associate professor in the department of accounting and legal environment at Marshall University.

== Personal life and death ==
Keener was married to Susan Thompson. Their marriage lasted until Keener's death in 2026.

Keener died on June 27, 2026, at the age of 70.
