= Harry Keith White =

American politician

Member of the West Virginia House of Delegates from the 21st district
- In office January 2003 – January 5, 2016
- Succeeded by: Phyllis White
- In office 1992–2003

Member of the West Virginia House of Delegates from the 19th district
- In office January 1997 – January 2003

Member of the West Virginia House of Delegates from the 19th district
- In office September 11, 1992 – January 1995

Personal details
- Born: February 5, 1946 (age 80) Huntington, West Virginia, U.S.
- Party: Democratic
- Education: Marshall University

Military service
- Branch/service: United States Navy; Pilot
- Years of service: 1968–1973
- Rank: Lieutenant

Harry Keith White (born February 5, 1946) is an American politician who was a Democratic member of the West Virginia House of Delegates representing District 21 from January 2003 to January 5, 2016. White served consecutively from January 1997 until January 2003 and non-consecutively from his appointment September 11, 1992, until January 1995 in a District 19 seat. He is 75 years old

== Education ==
White earned his BBA from Marshall University.

== Elections ==
- 2012 White was challenged in the May 8, 2012, Democratic Primary, winning with 2,622 votes (83.7%), and won the November 6, 2012, General election with 3,816 votes (72.6%) against Republican nominee Roger Stacy.
- Early 1990s Initially appointed to District 19, White was elected in the 1992 Democratic Primary and the November 3, 1992, General election.
- 1996 White and Steven Kominar won the 1996 Democratic Primary and the November 5, 1996, General election.
- 1998 White and Representative Kominar were challenged in the six-way 1998 Democratic Primary where both placed and were unopposed for the November 3, 1998, General election.
- 2000 White and Representative Kominar were challenged in the six-way 2000 Democratic Primary where both placed and were unopposed for the November 7, 2000, General election.
- 2002 Redistricted to District 21, with incumbent Representative Earnie Kuhn redistricted to District 18, White was unopposed for both the 2002 Democratic Primary and the November 5, 2002, General election.
- 2004 White was unopposed for the 2004 Democratic Primary and won the November 2, 2004, General election against Republican nominee James Saunders.
- 2006 White and returning 2004 Republican opponent James Saunders were both unopposed for their 2006 primaries, setting up a rematch; White won the November 7, 2006, General election against Saunders.
- 2008 White was unopposed for both the May 13, 2008, Democratic Primary, winning with 3,478 votes, and the November 4, 2008, General election, winning with 3,461 votes.
- 2010 White was unopposed for both the May 11, 2010, Democratic Primary, winning with 2,323 votes, and the November 2, 2010, General election, winning with 2,593 votes.
