= Tom Azinger =

American politician (1935–2024)

Member of the West Virginia House of Delegates from the 10th district
- In office 2018–2020
- Succeeded by: Roger Conley
- In office January 1995 – 2014
- Succeeded by: Mike Azinger

Personal details
- Born: July 2, 1935 Parkersburg, West Virginia, U.S.
- Died: July 13, 2024 (aged 89)
- Party: Republican
- Education: West Virginia University

Thomas Albert Azinger (July 2, 1935 – July 13, 2024) was an American politician and former Republican member of the West Virginia House of Delegates. He represented District 10 from January 1995 until his retirement in 2014.

== Life and career ==
Tom Azinger was born in Parkersburg, West Virginia, on July 2, 1935. He earned his BS degree from West Virginia University. Azinger died on July 13, 2024, at the age of 89.

== Elections ==
- 2012 Azinger placed second in the three-way May 8, 2012, Republican Primary with 3,355 votes (35.4%), and placed first in the four-way three-position November 6, 2012 General election with 12,955 votes (27.1%) ahead of incumbent Republican Representative John Ellem, Democratic Representative Daniel Poling, and Republican perennial candidate Frederick Gillespie, who had run for the seat in 2000, 2002, 2004, 2006, 2008, and 2010.
- 1990s Azinger was initially elected in the 1994 Republican Primary and the November 8, 1994, General election, and re-elected in the November 5, 1996, General election.
- 1998 Azinger placed in the four-way 1998 Republican Primary and was re-elected in the seven-way three-position November 3, 1998, General election with Democratic incumbent J. D. Beane and Republican nominee Gene Modesitt.
- 2000 Azinger placed in the four-way 2000 Republican Primary and was re-elected in the six-way three-position November 7, 2000, General election with incumbents Beane (D) and Modesitt (R).
- 2002 Azinger placed in the five-way 2002 Republican Primary and was re-elected in the six-way three-position November 5, 2002, General election with incumbents Beane (D) and Ellem (R), who had been appointed to replace Modesitt.
- 2004 Azinger placed in the five-way 2004 Republican Primary and was re-elected in the six-way three-position November 2, 2004, General election with incumbents Beane (D) and Ellem (R).
- 2006 Azinger placed in the four-way 2006 Republican Primary and was re-elected in the six-way three-position November 7, 2006, General election with incumbents Beane (D) and Ellem (R).
- 2008 When Representative Beane left the Legislature and appointed Representative Daniel Poling (D) ran for re-election, Azinger placed first in the seven-way May 13, 2008, Republican Primary with 3,109 votes (23.9%), and placed first in the six-way three-position November 4, 2008, General election with 11,067 votes (19.2%) ahead of incumbent Representatives Ellem (R) and Poling (D).
- 2010 Azinger placed first in the eight-way May 11, 2010, Republican Primary with 2,613 votes (21.4%), and placed second in the four-way three-position November 2, 2010, General election with 9,853 votes (26.8%) behind incumbent Ellem (R) and ahead of incumbent Poling (D) and Republican nominee Frederick Gillespie.
