= John Frazier (politician) =

American politician (born 1945)

Member of the West Virginia House of Delegates from the 25th district
- In office 2008–2012
- In office 1980–1982

Personal details
- Born: August 2, 1945 (age 80)
- Party: Democratic
- Education: Concord College
- Alma mater: West Virginia University College of Law

John R. Frazier (born August 2, 1945) is an American politician from West Virginia. He was a Democrat and represented District 25 in the West Virginia House of Delegates. He was a Circuit Judge in Mercer County.
