= David Walker (West Virginia politician) =

American politician (born 1952)

Member of the West Virginia House of Delegates from the 33rd district
- In office December 1, 2008 – December 1, 2014
- Preceded by: Bill Stemple
- Succeeded by: Roger Hanshaw

Personal details
- Born: January 16, 1952 (age 74) Charleston, West Virginia, U.S.
- Party: Democratic

David Allen Walker (born January 16, 1952) is an American politician who was a Democratic member of the West Virginia House of Delegates representing District 33 from 2008 to 2014.

== Education ==
Walker graduated from Herbert Hoover High School.

== Elections ==
- 1996 Walker ran in the District 33 1996 Democratic Primary, but lost to Bill Stemple, who went on to win the November 5, 1996 General election.
- 1998 Walker challenged incumbent Representative Stemple in the four-way 1998 Democratic Primary but lost to Representative Stemple, who was unopposed for the November 3, 1998 General election.
- 2000 Walker placed in the three-way 2000 Democratic Primary but again lost to Representative Stemple, who won the November 7, 2000 General election against Republican nominee Ben Murphy.
- 2008 When District 33 Democratic Representative Stemple retired and left the seat open, Walker ran in the five-way May 13, 2008 Democratic Primary and placed first by 37 votes with 1,238 votes (30.6%), and won the November 4, 2008 General election with 3,635 votes (67.9%) against Republican nominee Larry Cole.
- 2010 Walker was challenged in the May 11, 2010 Democratic Primary and won with 1,644 votes (57.7%), and was unopposed for the November 2, 2010 General election, winning with 3,225 votes.
- 2012 Walker was challenged for the May 8, 2012 Democratic Primary but won with 2,028 votes (61.1%), and was unopposed for the November 6, 2012 General election, winning with 4,575 votes.
