= Mike Manypenny =

American politician

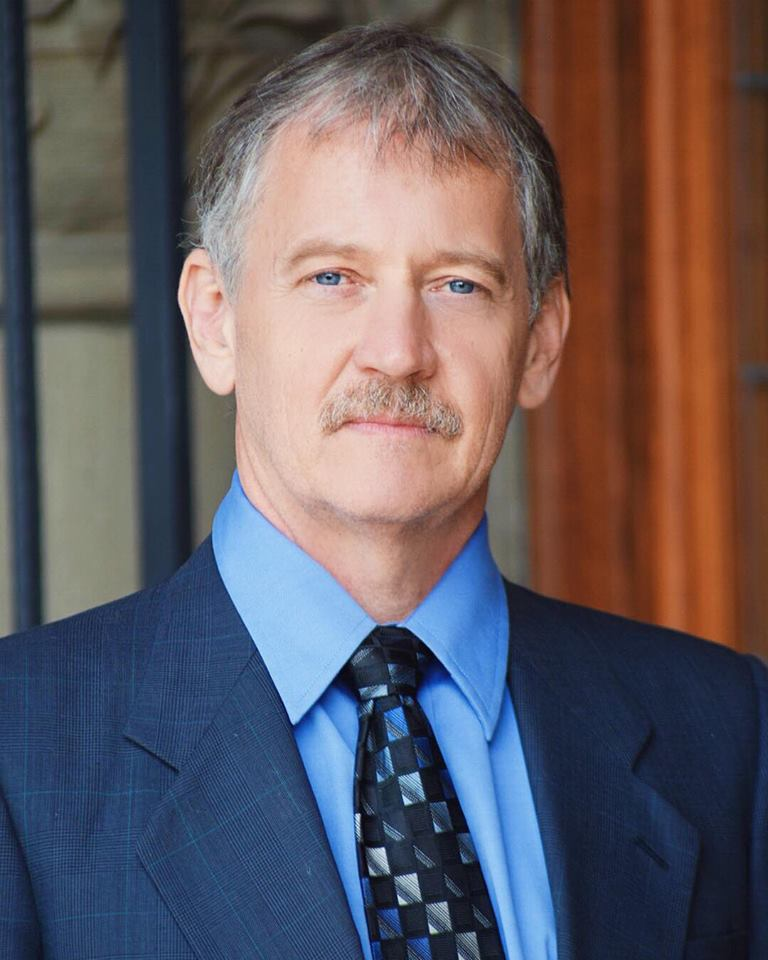

Member of the West Virginia House of Delegates from the 49th district
- In office January 2009 – January 2015
- Succeeded by: Amy Summers

Personal details
- Born: August 1, 1959 (age 67) East Liverpool, Ohio
- Party: Democratic
- Education: West Virginia University
- Profession: Farmer
- Website: Campaign Website

Michael Noel Manypenny II (born August 1, 1959 in East Liverpool, Ohio) is an American politician and a former Democratic member of the West Virginia House of Delegates. Manypenny served in the House of Delegates from 2009 until January 2015; he represented District 42 prior to 2013 and District 49 from 2013 to 2015. In 2016, Manypenny ran for Congress in West Virginia's 1st congressional district, but was defeated by Republican incumbent David McKinley.

He ran unsuccessfully in 2020 and 2024 for his former seat.

In 2026 he ran for the West Virginia House of Delegates as a Republican, however was defeated in the primary.

== Education ==
Manypenny earned his BS in agriculture and forestry from West Virginia University.

== U.S. House of Representatives ==
=== Elections ===
==== 2016 election ====
Manypenny decided to run in West Virginia's 1st congressional district in 2015. He faced no opponent in the primary election. In the general election, he ran against three-term incumbent Republican David McKinley, who was also uncontested in his primary. McKinley defeated Manypenny handily in the general, with 69% of the vote to Manypenny's 31%.

== Elections ==
- 2004 When District 42 Democratic Representative Tom Coleman left the Legislature and left the seat open, Manypenny ran in the three-way 2004 Democratic Primary but lost to Diane Parker, who lost the November 2, 2004 General election to Republican nominee Jeff Tansill.
- 2006 To challenge Representative Tansill, Manypenny was unopposed for the 2006 Democratic Primary but lost the November 7, 2006 General election to Representative Tansill.
- 2008 When District 42 Democratic Representative Tansill left the Legislature and left the seat open, Manypenny ran in the May 13, 2008 Democratic Primary and placed first with 2,390 votes (67.2%), and was unopposed for the November 4, 2008 General election, winning with 5,913 votes.
- 2010 Manypenny and former Representative Tansill were both unopposed for their May 11, 2010 primaries, setting up a rematch of their 2006 contest; Manypenny won the November 2, 2010 General election with 3,223 votes (54.2%) against former Representative Tansill.
- 2012 Redistricted to District 49, and with incumbent Representative Gary Howell redistricted to District 56, Manypenny was challenged in the May 8, 2012 Democratic Primary but won with 1,801 votes (72.2%), and won the November 6, 2012 General election with 3,453 votes (53.1%) against former Republican Representative Jeff Tansill in their third contest.
- 2014 Manypenny was defeated by Republican Amy Summers in 2014.
