= William Romine =

American politician

Member of the West Virginia House of Delegates from the 6th district
- In office January 2001 – 2018
- Preceded by: James Willison

Personal details
- Born: January 27, 1944 (age 82) Doddridge County, West Virginia, U.S.
- Party: Republican
- Education: Salem College; West Virginia University

William Roger Romine (born January 27, 1944) is an American politician who was a Republican member of the West Virginia House of Delegates representing District 6 from January 2001 to 2018.

== Education ==
Romine earned his BS from Salem College (now Salem International University) and his MA from West Virginia University.

== Elections ==
- 2012 Romine and returning 2010 Democratic challenger Charles Delauder won their May 8, 2012 primaries, setting up a rematch; Romine won the November 6, 2012 General election with 4,028 votes (67.5%) against Delauder.
- 2000 Romine challenged District 6 incumbent Representative James Willison in the 2000 Republican Primary and won, and was unopposed for the November 7, 2000 General election.
- 2002 Romine was unopposed for both the 2002 Republican Primary and the November 5, 2002 General election.
- 2004 Romine was unopposed for both the 2004 Republican Primary and the November 2, 2004 General election.
- 2006 Romine was unopposed for both the 2006 Republican Primary and the November 7, 2006 General election.
- 2008 Romine was unopposed for both the May 13, 2008 Republican Primary, winning with 2,708 votes, and the November 4, 2008 General election, winning with 5,845 votes.
- 2010 Romine was unopposed for the May 11, 2010 Republican Primary, winning with 2,403 votes, and won the November 2, 2010 General election with 3,608 votes (69.7%) against Democratic nominee Charles Delauder.
