= Roy Givens =

American politician (1929–2019)

Member of the West Virginia House of Delegates from the 2nd district
- In office 2008–2012
- In office 1994–2002
- In office 1978–1990

Personal details
- Born: April 27, 1929 Wellsburg, West Virginia
- Died: January 3, 2019 (aged 89)
- Party: Democratic
- Education: West Liberty State College

Roy E. Givens (April 27, 1929 – January 3, 2019) was an American politician from West Virginia. He was a Democrat and represented District 2 in the West Virginia House of Delegates.

== Biography ==
Roy Givens was born on April 27, 1929, in Wellsburg, West Virginia. Givens served from 1978 to 1990, 1994 to 2002, and 2008 to 2012. In 2022, a section of State Route 2 between 12th Street was dedicated as U.S. Army Sgt. Roy E. Givens Memorial Road.
