= John Ellem =

American politician (born 1967)

Member of the West Virginia House of Delegates from the 10th district
- In office January 4, 2001 – January 4, 2015
- Preceded by: Rick Modesitt

Personal details
- Born: July 19, 1967 (age 59) Parkersburg, West Virginia, U.S.
- Party: Republican
- Education: Wheeling Jesuit University; West Virginia University College of Law
- Profession: Attorney

John Naif Ellem (born July 19, 1967) is an American politician who was a Republican member of the West Virginia House of Delegates representing District 10 since his January 4, 2001 appointment to fill the vacancy caused by the resignation of Representative Rick Modesitt. In 2014, Ellem announced that he would not be running for re-election.

== Education ==
Ellem earned his BS from Wheeling Jesuit University and his JD from the West Virginia University College of Law.

== Elections ==
- 2012 Ellem placed first in the three-way May 8, 2012 Republican Primary with 3,379 votes (35.7%), and placed second in the four-way three-position November 6, 2012 General election with 12,801 votes (26.7%) behind incumbent Republican Representative Tom Azinger and ahead of incumbent Democratic Representative Daniel Poling and Republican perennial candidate Frederick Gillespie, who had run for the seat in 2000, 2002, 2004, 2006, 2008, and 2010.
- 2002 Ellem placed in the five-way 2002 Republican Primary, and was elected in the six-way three-position November 5, 2002 General election alongside fellow incumbent Representatives J. D. Beane (D) and Tom Azinger (R).
- 2004 Ellem placed in the five-way 2004 Republican Primary and was re-elected in the six-way three-position November 2, 2004 General election with incumbents Beane (D) and Azinger (R).
- 2006 Ellem placed in the four-way 2006 Republican Primary and was re-elected in the six-way three-position November 7, 2006 General election incumbents Beane (D) and Azinger (R).
- 2008 When Representative Beane left the Legislature and appointed Representative Daniel Poling (D) ran for re-election, Ellem placed second in the seven-way May 13, 2008 Republican Primary with 2,969 votes (22.8%), and placed second in the six-way three-position November 4, 2008 General election with 11,003 votes (19.1%) behind Representative Azinger (R) and ahead of incumbent Representative Daniel Poling (D).
- 2010 Ellem placed second in the eight-way May 11, 2010 Republican Primary with 2,558 votes (20.9%), and placed first in the four-way three-position November 2, 2010 General election with 10,307 votes (28.1%) ahead of incumbents Azinger (R) and Poling (D) and Republican nominee Frederick Gillespie.
