= Danny Hamrick =

American politician (born 1988)

Member of the West Virginia House of Delegates from the 48th district
- In office December 1, 2012 – December 1, 2022
- Preceded by: Allen Evans
- Succeeded by: New boundaries

Personal details
- Born: April 27, 1988 (age 38) Clarksburg, West Virginia, U.S.
- Party: Republican
- Spouse: Brittany (m. 2008; div. 2019)
- Education: Fairmont State University
- Website: dannyhamrick.com

Daniel C. Hamrick (born April 27, 1988) is an American politician and a former Republican member of the West Virginia House of Delegates. He represented District 48 from 2012 to 2022.

In the 2022 West Virginia House of Delegates election, Hamrick lost the Republican primary in District 69 to Keith Marple.

== Education ==
Hamrick graduated from Liberty High School and attended Fairmont State University.

== Elections ==
- 2006: Initially in District 41, Hamrick ran in the four-way 2006 Republican Primary to challenge incumbent Democratic Representatives Cann, Fragale, Iaquinta, and Miley. However, he lost in the eight-way four-position general election on November 7, 2006 to the incumbents.
- 2008: Hamrick sought to challenge the incumbent Democratic Representatives again. Hamrick was unopposed for the May 13, 2008 Republican Primary, winning with 3,810 votes, setting up a rematch, but placed fifth in the five-way four-position November 4, 2008 General election.
- 2010: Hamrick ran in the five-way May 11, 2010 Republican Primary and placed first with 2,745 votes (26.1%), setting up his third contest with them, but again placed fifth in the eight-way four-position November 2, 2010 General election to the incumbents.
- 2012: Redistricted to District 48, Hamrick ran in the five-way May 8, 2012 Republican Primary and placed first with 2,984 votes (26.7%), and placed fourth in the eight-way four-position November 6, 2012 General election with 12,096 votes (13.5%), behind incumbent Democratic Representatives Tim Miley, Richard Iaquinta, and Sam Cann, and ahead of non-selectees incumbent Democratic Representative Ron Fragale and fellow Republican nominees Diana Bartley (who had run in 2010), Terry Woodside, and Ed Randolph.
- 2014: Hamrick was elected to his second term in the WV House of Delegates. He came in third place behind incumbent Tim Miley and Clarksburg City Councilman Patsy Trecost. Newcomer and fellow Republican, Terry Waxman, joined Delegate Hamrick taking the fourth spot in the House for the 48th District.
