= Tal Hutchins =

American politician (born 1949)

Member of the West Virginia House of Delegates from the 3rd district
- In office 2006–2010 Serving with Orphy Klempa
- Preceded by: L. Gil White; Chris Wakim
- Succeeded by: Erikka Lynn Storchh; Ryan Ferns
- In office 1994–2000 Serving with Greg D. Martin, L. Gil White
- Preceded by: David McKinley; L. Gil White
- Succeeded by: John "Jack" Fahey

Personal details
- Born: November 25, 1949 (age 76) Wheeling, West Virginia, U.S.
- Party: Democratic
- Spouse: Carmen
- Education: Bowling Green State University, West Virginia University
- Profession: Educator, consultant

Tal Hutchins (born November 25, 1949) is a Democratic member of the West Virginia House of Delegates, representing the 3rd District since 2006. He earlier served from 1994 through 2000.
