= Margaret Smith (West Virginia politician) =

American politician

Margaret Smith Peggy Donaldson Smith

Member of the West Virginia House of Delegates from the 46th district
- In office January 12, 2009 – January 2017
- Preceded by: Doug Stalnaker

Member of the West Virginia House of Delegates from the 38th district
- In office January 2009 – January 2017
- Preceded by: Doug Stalnaker
- Succeeded by: Patrick Lane

Personal details
- Born: 1952 (age 73–74) Weston, West Virginia, U.S.
- Party: Democratic
- Spouse(s): Michael Clay Smith, attorney at law
- Children: Melissa Riley
- Education: West Virginia Wesleyan College; West Virginia University; West Virginia University College of Law
- Profession: Assistant State Treasurer, West Virginia, Attorney, Professor

Margaret 'Peggy' Donaldson Smith (born 1952) is an American politician and a Democratic member of the West Virginia House of Delegates who served four terms in the West Virginia Legislature representing Districts 38 and 46 from January 2009 until January 2017.

== Education ==
Smith earned her B.A. with honors from West Virginia Wesleyan College, her M.A. and Ed.D. from West Virginia University, and her J.D. from the West Virginia University College of Law.

== Elections ==
- 2014 and 2016 Smith won Primary and General elections to represent District 46.
- 2012 Redistricted to District 46, and with incumbent Representative Stan Shaver redistricted to District 53, Smith was unopposed for both the May 8, 2012 Democratic Primary, winning with 2,125 votes, and the November 6, 2012 General election, winning with 5,670 votes.
- 2008 When District 38 Democratic Representative Doug Stalnaker ran for West Virginia Senate and left the seat open, Smith ran in the four-way May 13, 2008 Democratic Primary and placed first with 1,498 votes (45.0%), and won the November 4, 2008 General election with 4,510 votes (65.7%) against Republican nominee Derrick Love, who had run for the seat in 2004 and 2006.
- 2010 Smith was unopposed for both the May 11, 2010 Democratic Primary, winning with 1,301 votes, and the November 2, 2010 General election, winning with 4,291 votes.
