= Troy Andes =

American politician

Member of the West Virginia House of Delegates from the 15th district
- In office January 12, 2013 – 2014

Member of the West Virginia House of Delegates from the 14th district
- In office January 2007 – January 2013
- Preceded by: Mike Hall

Personal details
- Born: April 16, 1981 (age 45) Pittsburgh, Pennsylvania, U.S.
- Party: Republican
- Education: Virginia Tech; Marshall University

Troy Andes (born April 16, 1981) is an American politician who was a Republican member of the West Virginia House of Delegates representing District 58 from January 12, 2013 to 2014. Andes served consecutively from January 2007 until January 2013 in a District 14 seat.

== Education ==
Andes earned his BS from Virginia Tech and his MBA from Marshall University.

== Elections ==
- 2012 Redistricted to District 15, and with its incumbents redistricted to District 16, Andes was challenged in the May 8, 2012 Republican Primary, winning with 1,792 votes (82.0%), and was unopposed for the November 6, 2012 General election, winning with 7,004 votes.
- 2006 When District 14 Republican Representative Mike Hall ran for West Virginia Senate and left a district seat open, Andes placed in the five-way 2006 Republican Primary and was elected in the three-way two-position November 7, 2006 General election against Democratic nominee Gene Estel.
- 2008 Andes and fellow Republican incumbent Representative Patti Schoen were unopposed for the May 13, 2008 Republican Primary, where Andes placed first with 2,337 votes (52.2%), and placed first in the four-way two-position November 4, 2008 General election with 9,323 votes (31.4%) ahead of Representative Schoen and Democratic nominees Jeffrey Martin and Karen Corea.
- 2010 When Representative Schoen retired and left a district seat open, Andes placed first in the five-way May 11, 2010 Republican Primary, winning with 2,034 votes (42.8%), and placed first in the three-way two-position November 2, 2010 General election with 8,159 votes (40.3%) ahead of fellow Republican nominee Brian Savilla and Democratic nominee Catherine Larck.
