= Lynwood Ireland =

American politician (born 1942)

Member of the West Virginia House of Delegates from the 7th district
- In office January 2007 – November 2016
- Preceded by: Otis Leggett
- Succeeded by: Jason Harshbarger

Personal details
- Born: 1942 (age 83–84) Clarksburg, West Virginia, U.S.
- Party: Republican
- Education: West Virginia University

Military service
- Branch: United States Army
- Service years: 1965–1967

Lynwood 'Woody' K. Ireland (born in 1942) is an American politician who was a Republican member of the West Virginia House of Delegates representing District 7 from January 2007 to 2016.

== Education ==
Ireland earned his BS degree from West Virginia University.

== Elections ==
- 2006 When District 7 Republican Representative Otis Leggett retired and left the seat open, Ireland won the 2006 Republican Primary and won the November 7, 2006 General election against Democratic nominee Paul Janes, who had run for the seat in 1998 and 2002.
- 2008 Ireland was unopposed for the May 13, 2008 Republican Primary, winning with 2,231 votes, and won the November 4, 2008 General election with 4,222 votes (63.6%) against Democratic nominee Ronald Nichols.
- 2010 Ireland was unopposed for both the May 11, 2010 Republican Primary, winning with 1,631 votes, and the November 2, 2010 General election, winning with 4,486 votes.
- 2012 Ireland was unopposed for both the May 8, 2012 Republican Primary with 1,885 votes, and the November 6, 2012 General election, winning with 5,356 votes.
