= Daniel Poling =

American politician

Member of the West Virginia House of Delegates from the 10th district
- In office January 2007 – 2014
- Preceded by: J. D. Beane

Personal details
- Born: October 3, 1954 (age 71) Parkersburg, West Virginia, U.S.
- Party: Democratic

Daniel Joseph Poling (born October 3, 1954) is an American politician who was a Democratic member of the West Virginia House of Delegates representing District 10 from January 2007 to 2014. He was appointed by West Virginia Governor Joe Manchin to fill the vacancy caused by the resignation of Representative J. D. Beane.

== Education ==
Poling graduated from Parkersburg South High School.

== Elections ==
- 2012 Poling was unopposed for the May 8, 2012 Democratic Primary, winning with 3,962 votes, and placed third in the four-way three-position November 6, 2012 General election with 11,844 votes (24.7%) behind incumbent Republican Representatives Tom Azinger and John Ellem and ahead of returning 2008 and 2010 Republican opponent Frederick Gillespie.
- 2008 Poling ran in the four-way May 13, 2008 Democratic Primary and placed second with 4,337 votes (27.1%), and placed third in the six-way three-position November 4, 2008 General election by 9 votes with 10,086 votes (17.5%) behind incumbent Republican Representatives Azinger and Ellem and ahead of Brenda Brum (D), Frederick Gillespie (R), and Iris McCrady (D).
- 2010 Poling was unopposed for the May 11, 2010 Democratic Primary, winning with 3,200 votes, and placed third in the four-way three-position November 2, 2010 General election with 8,592 votes (23.4%) behind incumbent Republican Representatives Ellem and Azinger and ahead of Republican nominee Frederick Gillespie.
