= Thomas Campbell (West Virginia politician) =

American politician (born 1961)

Member of the West Virginia House of Delegates from the 28th district
- In office 1996–2012

Personal details
- Born: May 29, 1961 (age 65)
- Party: Democratic

Thomas Wood Campbell (born May 29, 1961) is an American politician from West Virginia. He is a Democrat and represented District 28 in the West Virginia House of Delegates. He served on the West Virginia Board of Education. He was a member of Lewisburg City Council.
