= John Doyle (West Virginia politician) =

American politician

Member of the West Virginia House of Delegates from the 67th district
- In office December 1, 2018 – December 1, 2022
- Preceded by: Riley Moore
- Succeeded by: New boundaries
- In office 1992 – December 1, 2012
- Succeeded by: Stephen Skinner
- In office 1982 – December 1, 1984

Personal details
- Born: March 31, 1942 (age 84) Covington, Virginia, U.S.
- Party: Democratic
- Education: Shepherd University
- Occupation: sales

John Doyle (born March 31, 1942) is an American politician who served as a member of the West Virginia House of Delegates from the 67th District. He served from 1982 through 1984, from 1992 through 2012, and from 2018 to 2022.
