= Tiffany Lawrence =

American politician

Member of the West Virginia House of Representatives from the 65th district
- In office January 2009 – January 2015
- Succeeded by: Jill Upson

Personal details
- Born: July 13, 1982 (age 44) Martinsburg, West Virginia, U.S.
- Party: Democratic
- Education: Shepherd University; Shenandoah University

Tiffany E. Lawrence (born July 13, 1982) is an American politician who was a Democratic member of the West Virginia House of Delegates from 2009 to 2015, representing the 65th district. Lawrence is a former Miss West Virginia.

Lawrence was elected to the Legislature in 2008 and served three terms. In the 2014 election, despite raising more money for her campaign than any other candidate in her region of the state, Lawrence was defeated by Republican challenger Jill Upson.

Preceded by Kimberly Goodwin	Miss West Virginia; 2006	Succeeded by Summer Wyatt
