= Steven Kominar =

American politician

Member of the West Virginia House of Delegates from the 20th district
- In office December 1, 1994 – December 29, 2011
- Succeeded by: Justin Marcum

Personal details
- Born: May 3, 1946 (age 80)
- Party: Democratic

Steven Kominar (born May 3, 1946) is an American politician who served in the West Virginia House of Delegates from the 20th district from 1994 to 2011.
