= Robert Schadler =

American politician and businessman

Member of the West Virginia House of Delegates from the 49th district
- In office 1998–2012
- In office 1988–1992

Personal details
- Party: Republican
- Education: Potomac State College (AA); West Virginia University (BA)

Robert A. Schadler is an American politician and businessman who served as a member of the West Virginia House of Delegates for the 49th district from 1988 to 1992 and again from 1998 to 2010. Schadler represented a district that includes Mineral County.

== Education ==
Schadler earned an associate degree from the Potomac State College of West Virginia University and a Bachelor of Arts degree from West Virginia University. He also received a license in mortuary science.

== Career ==
Prior to entering politics, Schadler worked as a mortician and florist. During his tenure in the West Virginia House of Delegates, Schadler was the vice chair of the Health and Human Resources Committee.

As a member of the Mineral County Republican Executive Committee, Schadler, campaigned for Democrat candidates in violation of party rules. He was subsequently removed from his position for the violation. He then sued in Circuit Court to have the decision overturned and lost his case. Upon appeal the lower courts decision allowing his removal was upheld by a 5–0 decision of the Supreme Court of Appeals of West Virginia. In 2010, Schadler was mentioned as a possible candidate for Mineral County circuit clerk.
