= Patrick Lane (politician) =

American politician (born 1975)

Member of the West Virginia House of Delegates from the 38th district
- In office January 12, 2013 – 2016

Member of the West Virginia House of Delegates from the 32nd district
- In office January 2005 – January 2013
- Preceded by: Rusty Webb

Personal details
- Born: March 12, 1975 (age 51) Clarksburg, West Virginia, U.S.
- Party: Republican
- Education: Concord College; West Virginia University College of Law
- Profession: Attorney

Patrick Glen Lane (born March 12, 1975) is an American politician who was a Republican member of the West Virginia House of Delegates representing District 38 from January 12, 2013 to 2016. Lane served consecutively from January 2005 until January 2013 in a District 32 seat, and was a candidate for West Virginia Senate in 2002.

== Education ==
Lane earned his BA in political science from Concord College (now Concord University) and his JD from the West Virginia University College of Law.

== Elections ==
- 2012 Redistricted to District 38, and with incumbent Representative Margaret Smith redistricted to District 46, Lane was unopposed for the May 8, 2012, Republican Primary, winning with 1,273 votes, and won the November 6, 2012, General election with 5,084 votes (64.2%) against Democratic nominee Virginia Moles.
- 2002 To challenge Senate District 17 incumbent Democratic Senator Brooks McCabe, Lane was unopposed for the 2002 Republican Primary but lost the November 5, 2002, General election to Senator McCabe, who has held the seat since 1999.
- 2004 When House District 32 incumbent Representative Rusty Webb ran for West Virginia Senate and left a district seat open, Lane placed in the five-way 2004 Republican Primary displacing Representative Renner, and was elected in the six-way three-position November 2, 2004, General election with incumbents Tim Armstead (R) and Ron Walters (R).
- 2006 Lane and Representatives Armstead and Walters were unopposed for the 2006 Republican Primary and were re-elected in the six-way three-position November 7, 2006, General election against Democratic nominees John Cain, Lucille Chandler, and Jim Francis.
- 2008 Lane and Representatives Armstead and Walters were unopposed for the May 13, 2008, Republican Primary, where Lane placed third with 2,347 votes (30.9%), and placed third in the six-way three-position November 4, 2008, General election with 8,857 votes (17.6%) behind Representatives Armstead (R) and Walters (R), and ahead of Democratic nominees returning 2006 opponent John Cain, Carmela Ryan-Thompson, and Charles Black.
- 2010 Lane and Representatives Armstead and Walters were unopposed for the May 11, 2010, Republican Primary, where Lane placed third with 1,578 votes (31.6%), and placed third in the seven-way three-position November 2, 2010, General election with 8,029 votes (20.4%) behind Representatives Armstead (R) and Walters (R) and ahead of Democratic nominees Clint Casto, Philip Lavigne, returning 2008 challenger Charles Black, and Mountain Party candidate Jesse Johnson.
