= Josh Stowers =

American politician (born 1979)

Deputy State Treasurer
- In office 2013–2017
- Governor: Earl Ray Tomblin

Member of the West Virginia House of Representatives from the 19th district
- In office 2009–2013

Personal details
- Born: January 1, 1979 (age 47) Spartanburg, South Carolina
- Party: Republican
- Education: Concord College; Marshall University
- Occupation: Educator

Josh Stowers is a Republican former member of the West Virginia House of Delegates, serving from 2009 to 2013. Stowers resigned from the legislature to take a job as Deputy State Treasurer of West Virginia. Stowers was also previously an assistant principal at Horace Mann Middle School. In 2021, Stowers left his position at the State Treasurer’s office and was named President & CEO of Guaranty Bank, a WV community bank with branches in Mingo and Wayne Counties as well as Charleston.

Stowers was elected to a six-year term as a Lincoln County Commissioner in November 2018.

In January 2023, Stowers changed his party affiliation from Democrat to Republican. He was subsequently successful in the 2024 Republican primary for his second term on the Lincoln County Commission, winning over his challenger by a margin of over 15%. Stowers was unopposed in the General Election thereby winning a second six-year term on the Lincoln County Commission.
