= Walter Duke =

American politician (born 1947)

Member of the West Virginia House of Delegates for District 61
- In office 2014–2016

Member of the West Virginia House of Delegates for District 54
- In office 2002–2012

Personal details
- Born: September 18, 1947 (age 78)
- Party: Republican
- Education: West Virginia University

Walter Duke (born September 18, 1947) is an American politician from West Virginia. He was a member of the West Virginia House of Delegates from 2002 to 2012 and again from 2014 to 2016.
