= Sharon Spencer =

American politician

Member of the West Virginia House of Delegates from the 30th district
- In office December 1, 1996 – December 1, 2010
- Preceded by: Multi-member district
- Succeeded by: Eric Nelson
- In office December 1, 1986 – December 1, 1994
- Preceded by: Multi-member district
- Succeeded by: Multi-member district
- In office December 1, 1982 – December 1, 1984
- Preceded by: Multi-member district
- Succeeded by: Multi-member district

Personal details
- Born: October 10, 1947 (age 78) Charleston, West Virginia
- Party: Democratic

Sharon Spencer (born October 10, 1947) is an American politician who served in the West Virginia House of Delegates from the 30th district from 1982 to 1984 and from 1986 to 1994 and from 1996 to 2010.
