= Allen V. Evans =

American politician

Member of the West Virginia House of Delegates from the 54th district
- In office December 1, 1990 – December 1, 2018
- Succeeded by: John Paul Hott

Personal details
- Born: July 11, 1939 (age 87) Harrisonburg, Virginia
- Party: Republican
- Spouse: Beverly Riggleman
- Children: Alison
- Occupation: Poultry Farmer

Allen V. Evans is an American politician who was a member of the West Virginia House of Delegates from 1990 to 2018, representing Mineral County and Grant County. He served as a Minority Chair of the Agriculture committee.
