= Tim Miley =

Democratic politician, attorney, and author from West Virginia

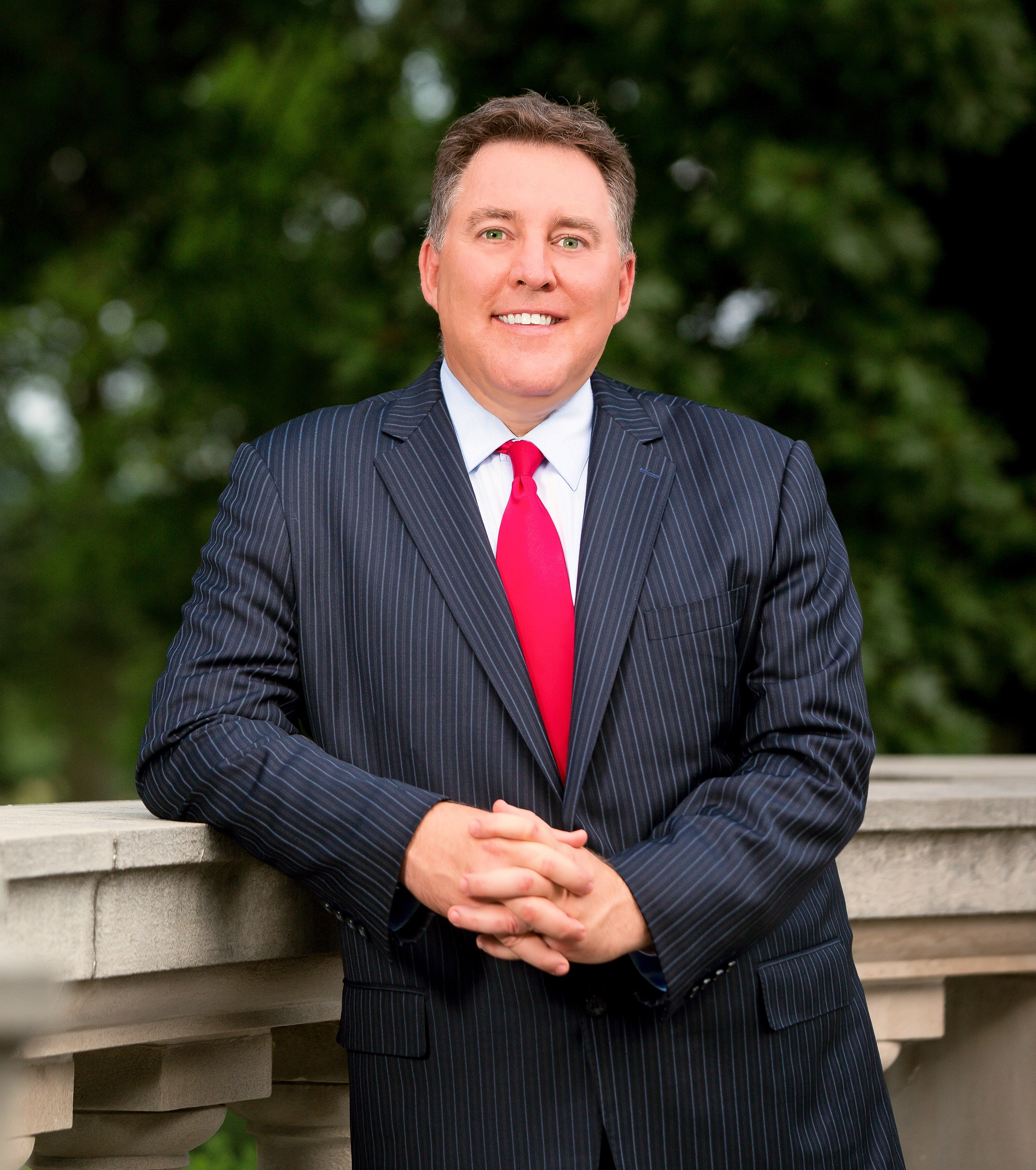

Speaker of the West Virginia House of Delegates
- In office June 18, 2013 – January 14, 2015
- Preceded by: Rick Thompson
- Succeeded by: Tim Armstead

Minority Leader of the West Virginia House of Delegates
- In office January 14, 2015 – November 30, 2020
- Preceded by: Tim Armstead
- Succeeded by: Doug Skaff

Member of the West Virginia House of Delegates from the 48th district
- In office December 1, 2004 – November 30, 2020
- Preceded by: Barbara Warner
- Succeeded by: Laura Kimble

Personal details
- Born: Timothy Robert Miley; April 11, 1966 (age 60) Cheverly, Maryland, U.S.
- Party: Democratic
- Spouse: Susan Aguayo Wilcher (m. 2009)
- Children: Jordin
- Education: Southern Methodist University (BBA); Duquesne University (JD)

Timothy Robert Miley (/ˈmaɪliː/; born April 11, 1966) is an American politician, personal injury attorney, and legal author who served as the 53rd speaker of the West Virginia House of Delegates from June 2013 to January 2015. A member of the Democratic Party, he represented West Virginia's 48th district (previously, the 41st) from 2004 to 2020, which included the cities of Clarksburg and Bridgeport. Subsequent to his speakership, Miley held the position of Minority Leader until his departure from the House in 2020. Since leaving the legislature, Miley has continued to practice law at his firm, The Miley Legal Group.

== Personal life and education ==
Miley was born in Cheverly, Maryland in 1966 to Robert and Sandra Miley. He earned a degree in finance from Southern Methodist University in 1988 and graduated from Duquesne University School of Law in 1991.

Miley currently resides in Clarksburg, West Virginia with his wife, Susan. Miley also has a step-daughter, Jordin.

== Career ==
=== Legal and business career ===
In 1991, Miley began his legal career at Steptoe & Johnson, where he represented insurance companies. After representing insurers for five years and growing increasingly disillusioned with their questionable tactics, Miley decided he would rather assist injured parties more than insurance companies and began practicing in personal injury, opening his own firm, Romano & Miley, in 1996. In June 2006, Miley founded The Miley Legal Group, a four-lawyer personal injury firm in Clarksburg, West Virginia, where he continues to practice.

=== Political career ===
During his tenure in the West Virginia House of Delegates, Miley served as a member of the House Rules Committee, Energy Committee, and Small Business and Economic Development Committee and, prior to his election as Speaker, held the position of chairman of the House Judiciary Committee.

Although Miley did not seek re-election in 2020, he did not rule out the possibility of future political aspirations and has expressed his intention to work on the issues of substance abuse and homelessness within his local community.

=== Publications ===
Miley is the author of The 7 Crucial Facts That You Need To Know After Being Injured In A WV Car Accident, 5 Critical Factors You Must Consider Before Hiring a Lawyer, West Virginia Bikers Guide: The Tools You Need to Get Back on the Road After an Accident, and When Dog's Attack: The Step by Step Guide to West Virginia Dog Bite Claims. Miley also authored a chapter in the book Wolf in Sheep's Clothing: What Your Insurance Company Doesn't Want You to Know entitled "Seven 'Sneaky' Ways Insurance Companies Sabotage Your Injury Claim".

== Bibliography ==
- America's Premier Attorneys; Miley, Timothy R., Esq. (2011). "Seven 'Sneaky' Ways Insurance Companies Sabotage Your Injury Claim". Wolf in Sheep's Clothing: What Your Insurance Company Doesn't Want You to Know. Additional contributions from 14 others. Winter Park, FL: Celebrity Press. ISBN 9780982908358.

Political offices
Preceded by Rick Thompson	Speaker of the West Virginia House of Delegates; 2013–2015	Succeeded by Tim Armstead
West Virginia House of Delegates
Preceded by Tim Armstead	Minority Leader of the West Virginia House of Delegates; 2015–2020	Succeeded by Doug Skaff
