= 2016 West Virginia Senate election =

West Virginia Senate Midterm Election held in 2016

- November 8, 2016

18 of the 34 seats in the West Virginia Senate (Note: A special election was held in District 3, adding a race to the normal 17 seat election cycle.) 18 seats needed for a majority
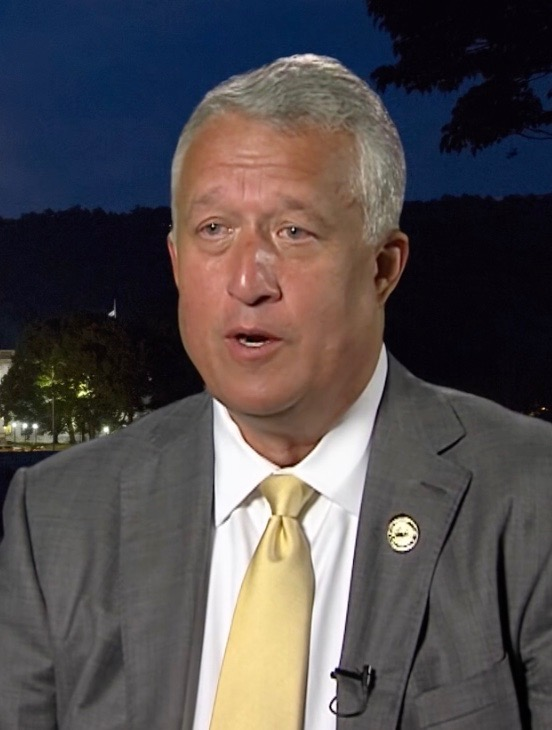

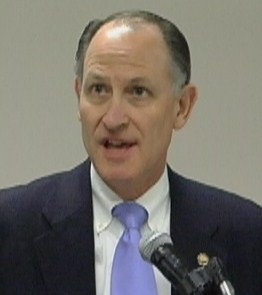
	Majority party	Minority party
Leader	Bill Cole (retired)	Jeff Kessler (retired)
Party	Republican	Democratic
Leader's seat	6th district	2nd district
Seats before	18	16
Seats won	22	12
Seat change	▲4	▼4
Popular vote	379,414	345,598
Percentage	51.8%	47.2%
Seats up	8	10
Races won	12	6
- Results of the elections: Democratic gain Republican gain Democratic hold Republican hold Rectangular inset (District 3): both seats up for election
Senate President before election
Bill Cole
Republican
Elected Senate President
Mitch Carmichael
Republican

The 2016 West Virginia Senate elections were held on November 8, 2016, as part of the biennial United States elections. Seventeen of West Virginia's 34 state senators were up for regular selection, along with an unexpired term for another seat. West Virginia Senate districts each have two elected representatives. State senators serve staggered four-year terms in West Virginia, with one senator from each district up in even-numbered years corresponding to presidential election years (such as 2016), and the other up in even-numbered years corresponding to presidential midterm years.

Primary elections in the state were held on May 10. After the previous 2014 state elections, Republicans held a slim majority in the Senate, holding 18 seats to the Democrats' 16. The Republican Party had long been the minority party in West Virginia, but the decline of the strength of coal worker unions, the Democratic Party's increasing focus on environmentalism, the unpopularity of President Barack Obama, and the increasing social conservatism of the Republican Party have helped the GOP solidify power in the state rapidly since 2000.

The high popularity of candidate Donald Trump within the state and his 42-point margin of victory, helped the Republicans gain four seats. This can be attributed to the increasing association of the West Virginia Democratic Party with the national Democratic Party, and a strong year for the Republican Party nationally, in which they gained control of the presidency, and kept control of the U.S. House of Representatives and U.S. Senate. Donald Trump won West Virginia with 68.5% of the vote, his largest share of the vote in any state. Trump's performance helped Republican Senate candidates down-ballot, as he won every senate district in the state.

Following the state's 2016 Senate elections, Republicans maintained and increased their control of the Senate with 22 seats to the Democrats' 12.

== Retirements ==
Four incumbents did not run for re-election in 2016. Those incumbents are:

=== Republicans ===
1. District 6: Bill Cole: Retired to run in the 2016 Gubernatorial Election.

=== Democrats ===
1. District 2: Jeff Kessler: Retired to run in the 2016 Gubernatorial Election.
2. District 10: William Laird: Retired
3. District 16: Herb Snyder: Retired

== Incumbents defeated ==
=== In primary elections ===
Two incumbents were defeated in the May 10 primaries. Senator Bob Ashley was appointed to the 3rd Senate District and was the incumbent for the remainder of the unexpired term. However, Ashley chose to challenge fellow incumbent senator Donna Boley for a full term.

==== Republican ====
1. District 3: Bob Ashley lost nomination to fellow incumbent Donna Boley.

==== Democrat ====
1. District 7: Art Kirkendoll lost renomination to Richard Ojeda.

=== In the general election ===
==== Republican ====
1. District 8: Chris Walters lost to Glenn Jeffries.

==== Democrats ====
1. District 1: Jack Yost lost to Ryan Weld.
2. District 14: Bob Williams lost to Randy Smith.

== Results summary ==
Votes, of total, by party
1. Republican (51.8%)
2. Democratic (47.2%)
3. Libertarian (0.77%)
4. Mountain (0.19%)

All results are certified by the Secretary of State of West Virginia.

Results
Party	Votes		Seats				
Party	Votes	%	Total before	Up	Won	Total after	±
Republican Party	379,414	51.83	18	8	12	22 / 34	▲4
Democratic Party	345,598	47.21	16	10	6	12 / 34	▼4
Libertarian Party	5,619	0.77	0	0	0	0 / 34	Steady
Mountain Party	1,404	0.19	0	0	0	0 / 34	Steady

Popular vote
Republican	51.83%
Democratic	47.21%
Libertarian	0.77%
Mountain	0.19%

Senate seats
Republican	64.71%
Democratic	35.29%

== Close races ==
District	Winner	Margin
District 12	Democratic	0.3%
District 4	Republican	2.1%
District 1	Republican (flip)	2.1%
District 11	Republican	2.1%
District 9	Republican	3.6%
District 16	Republican (flip)	5.6%
District 8	Democratic (flip)	6.2%
District 3 (Special)	Republican	9.3%
District 10	Republican (flip)	9.5%

== Predictions ==
Source	Ranking	As of
Governing	Lean R	October 12, 2016

== Summary of results by State Senate District ==
District	Incumbent			Elected Senator		Result
District	Member	Party	First elected	Member	Party	Result
District 1	Jack Yost	Democratic	2008	Ryan Weld	Republican	Republican Gain
District 2	Jeff Kessler	Democratic	1997 (appointed)	Mike Maroney	Republican	Republican Gain
District 3	Donna Boley	Republican	1985 (appointed)	Donna Boley	Republican	Republican Hold
District 3 (sp.)	Bob Ashley	Republican	2015 (appointed)	Mike Azinger	Republican	Republican Hold
District 4	Mitch Carmichael	Republican	2012	Mitch Carmichael	Republican	Republican Hold
District 5	Robert Plymale	Democratic	1992	Robert Plymale	Democratic	Democratic Hold
District 6	Bill Cole	Republican	2012	Chandler Swope	Republican	Republican Hold
District 7	Art Kirkendoll	Democratic	2011 (appointed)	Richard Ojeda	Democratic	Democratic Hold
District 8	Chris Walters	Republican	2012	Glenn Jeffries	Democratic	Democratic Gain
District 9	Sue Cline	Republican	2016 (appointed)	Sue Cline	Republican	Republican Hold
District 10	William Laird	Democratic	2008	Kenny Mann	Republican	Republican Gain
District 11	Greg Boso	Republican	2015 (appointed)	Greg Boso	Republican	Republican Hold
District 12	Doug Facemire	Democratic	2008	Doug Facemire	Democratic	Democratic Hold
District 13	Roman Prezioso	Democratic	1996	Roman Prezioso	Democratic	Democratic Hold
District 14	Bob Williams	Democratic	2008	Randy Smith	Republican	Republican Gain
District 15	Craig Blair	Republican	2012	Craig Blair	Republican	Republican Hold
District 16	Herb Snyder	Democratic	2008	Patricia Rucker	Republican	Republican Gain
District 17	Corey Palumbo	Democratic	2008	Corey Palumbo	Democratic	Democratic Hold

== Detailed results by State Senate District ==
All results are certified by the Secretary of State of West Virginia.

=== District 1 ===
2016 West Virginia Senate election, 1st Senate District
Party	Candidate	Votes	%
Republican	Ryan Weld	21,191	51.07%
Democratic	Jack Yost (incumbent)	20,303	48.93%
Total votes		41,494	100.00%
Republican gain from Democratic			

=== District 2 ===
2016 West Virginia Senate election, 2nd Senate District
Primary election
Party	Candidate	Votes	%
Republican	Mike Maroney	6,585	54.30%
Republican	Ginger Nalley	5,541	45.70%
Total votes		12,126	100.00%
General election
Republican	Mike Maroney	22,902	54.30%
Democratic	Lisa Zukoff	15,754	37.35%
Libertarian	H. John Rogers	3,521	8.35%
Total votes		42,177	100.00%
Republican gain from Democratic			

=== District 3 ===
In 2016, both seats were up for election due to an unusual series of events. Republican Bob Ashley, who had been appointed to the Senate following the departure of David Nohe in 2015, chose to run in a primary against his fellow senator Donna Boley, leaving his own seat open and triggering a special election.

==== Regular ====
2016 West Virginia Senate election, 3rd Senate District
Primary election
Party	Candidate	Votes	%
Republican	Donna Boley (incumbent)	11,508	62.97%
Republican	Bob Ashley	3,398	18.59%
Republican	John Riggs	3,368	18.43%
Total votes		18,274	100.00%
General election
Republican	Donna Boley (incumbent)	27,172	64.70%
Democratic	Bradley Vanzile	14,826	35.30%
Total votes		41,998	100.00%
Republican hold			

==== Special ====
2016 West Virginia Senate special election, 3rd Senate District
Primary election
Party	Candidate	Votes	%
Republican	Mike Azinger	9,065	60.72%
Republican	Sam Winans	5,865	39.28%
Total votes		14,930	100.00%
General election
Republican	Mike Azinger	23,034	54.64%
Democratic	Gregory K. Smith	19,125	45.36%
Total votes		42,159	100.00%
Republican hold			

=== District 4 ===
2016 West Virginia Senate election, 4th Senate District
Primary election
Party	Candidate	Votes	%
Republican	Mitch Carmichael (incumbent)	8,442	59.49%
Republican	Dustin Lewis	5,749	40.51%
Total votes		14,191	100.00%
Democratic	Brian Prim	6,999	58.77%
Democratic	Bruce Ashworth	4,910	41.23%
Total votes		11,909	100.00%
General election
Republican	Mitch Carmichael (incumbent)	22,032	51.05%
Democratic	Brian Prim	21,123	48.95%
Total votes		43,155	100.00%
Republican hold			

=== District 5 ===
2016 West Virginia Senate election, 5th Senate District
Party	Candidate	Votes	%
Democratic	Robert Plymale (incumbent)	22,863	60.24%
Republican	Tyson Smith	15,092	39.76%
Total votes		37,955	100.00%
Democratic hold			

=== District 6 ===
2016 West Virginia Senate election, 6th Senate District
Primary election
Party	Candidate	Votes	%
Democratic	Rocky Seay	8,618	64.64%
Democratic	Brandon Barker	4,715	35.36%
Total votes		13,333	100.00%
General election
Republican	Chandler Swope	20,776	57.11%
Democratic	Rocky Seay	15,606	42.89%
Total votes		36,382	100.00%
Republican hold			

=== District 7 ===
2016 West Virginia Senate election, 7th Senate District
Primary election
Party	Candidate	Votes	%
Democratic	Richard Ojeda	11,154	55.17%
Democratic	Art Kirkendoll (incumbent)	9,065	44.83%
Total votes		20,219	100.00%
Republican	Jordan Bridges	2,807	57.04%
Republican	Gary Johngrass	2,114	42.96%
Total votes		4,921	100.00%
General election
Democratic	Richard Ojeda	19,978	58.82%
Republican	Jordan Bridges	13,987	41.18%
Total votes		33,965	100.00%
Democratic hold			

=== District 8 ===
2016 West Virginia Senate election, 8th Senate District
Party	Candidate	Votes	%
Democratic	Glenn Jeffries	20,768	53.08%
Republican	Chris Walters (incumbent)	18,357	46.92%
Total votes		39,125	100.00%
Democratic gain from Republican			

=== District 9 ===
2016 West Virginia Senate election, 9th Senate District
Party	Candidate	Votes	%
Republican	Sue Cline (incumbent)	18,861	51.81%
Democratic	Mike Goode	17,545	48.19%
Total votes		36,406	100.00%
Republican hold			

=== District 10 ===
2016 West Virginia Senate election, 10th Senate District
Primary election
Party	Candidate	Votes	%
Republican	Kenny Mann	4,343	47.05%
Republican	Tom Ewing	3,444	37.31%
Republican	Dan Hill	1,443	15.64%
Total votes		9,230	100.00%
General election
Republican	Kenny Mann	21,148	54.73%
Democratic	Dave Perry	17,494	45.27%
Total votes		38,642	100.00%
Republican gain from Democratic			

=== District 11 ===
2016 West Virginia Senate election, 11th Senate District
Party	Candidate	Votes	%
Republican	Greg Boso (incumbent)	20,610	49.39%
Democratic	Denise Campbell	19,718	47.25%
Mountain	Bruce Breuninger	1,404	3.36%
Total votes		41,732	100.00%
Republican hold			

=== District 12 ===
2016 West Virginia Senate election, 12th Senate District
Primary election
Party	Candidate	Votes	%
Republican	Franklin Cornette	5,442	54.23%
Republican	Derrick W. Love	4,593	45.77%
Total votes		10,035	100.00%
General election
Democratic	Doug Facemire (incumbent)	21,295	50.13%
Republican	Franklin Cornette	21,188	49.87%
Total votes		42,483	100.00%
Democratic hold			

=== District 13 ===
2016 West Virginia Senate election, 13th Senate District
Primary election
Party	Candidate	Votes	%
Democratic	Roman Prezioso (incumbent)	10,433	59.58%
Democratic	Jack Oliver	7,078	40.42%
Total votes		17,511	100.00%
Republican	Barry Bledsoe	4,615	58.17%
Republican	James Clawson	3,318	41.83%
Total votes		7,933	100.00%
General election
Democratic	Roman Prezioso (incumbent)	24,404	59.60%
Republican	Barry Bledsoe	16,544	40.40%
Total votes		40,948	100.00%
Democratic hold			

=== District 14 ===
2016 West Virginia Senate election, 14th Senate District
Party	Candidate	Votes	%
Republican	Randy Smith	23,201	53.26%
Democratic	Bob Williams (incumbent)	18,264	41.93%
Libertarian	Matthew Persinger	2,098	4.82%
Total votes		43,563	100.00%
Republican gain from Democratic			

=== District 15 ===
2016 West Virginia Senate election, 15th Senate District
Primary election
Party	Candidate	Votes	%
Republican	Craig Blair (incumbent)	9,702	67.82%
Republican	Larry Kump	4,604	32.18%
Total votes		14,306	100.00%
General election
Republican	Craig Blair (incumbent)	32,475	70.44%
Democratic	Brad Noll	13,629	29.56%
Total votes		46,104	100.00%
Republican hold			

=== District 16 ===
2016 West Virginia Senate election, 16th Senate District
Primary election
Party	Candidate	Votes	%
Republican	Patricia Rucker	5,359	55.95%
Republican	Joe Funkhouser	4,219	44.05%
Total votes		9,578	100.00%
Democratic	Stephen Skinner	6,904	67.21%
Democratic	David Manthos	3,368	32.79%
Total votes		10,272	100.00%
General election
Republican	Patricia Rucker	22,499	52.79%
Democratic	Stephen Skinner	20,122	47.21%
Total votes		42,621	100.00%
Republican gain from Democratic			

=== District 17 ===
2016 West Virginia Senate election, 17th Senate District
Party	Candidate	Votes	%
Democratic	Corey Palumbo (incumbent)	22,781	55.39%
Republican	Chris Stansbury	18,345	44.61%
Total votes		41,126	100.00%
Democratic hold			
