= John Shott =

American politician

Member of the West Virginia House of Delegates from the 27th district
- In office January 12, 2013 – December 1, 2020

Member of the West Virginia Senate from the 10th district
- In office May 19, 2010 – January 2011 Serving with Ronald F. Miller
- Preceded by: Don Caruth
- Succeeded by: William Laird IV

Member of the West Virginia House of Delegates from the 24th district
- In office January 2009 – May 19, 2010
- Preceded by: Eustace Frederick
- Succeeded by: Bill Cole

Personal details
- Born: June 24, 1948 (age 78) Bluefield, West Virginia, U.S.
- Party: Republican
- Education: Davidson College; University of North Carolina School of Law
- Profession: Attorney

John Headley Shott (born June 24, 1948) is an American politician who was a Republican member of the West Virginia House of Delegates representing District 27 from January 12, 2013, to 2020. Shott served non-consecutively from January 2009 in the District 24 seat until his appointment May 19, 2010 to the West Virginia Senate District 10 seat to fill the vacancy caused by the death of Senator Don Caruth until January 2011.

== Education ==
Shott earned his BS in psychology from Davidson College and his JD from the University of North Carolina School of Law.

== Elections ==
- 2012 Redistricted to District 27, Shott ran in the three-way May 8, 2012 Republican Primary and placed first by 5 votes with 1,586 votes (33.9%), and placed first in the six-way November 6, 2012 General election with 10,998 votes (22.2%) ahead of fellow Republican nominees Joe Ellington and Marty Gearheart and Democratic nominees Ryan Flanigan, Greg Ball, and Bill Morefield, who had run for a District 25 seat in 2006 and 2010.
- 2008 Initially in District 24, Shott ran in the four-way May 13, 2008 Republican Primary, winning with 469 votes (65.4%); and won the November 4, 2008 General election with 3,144 votes (53.6%) against Democratic nominee Mike Vinciguerra.
