= Senator Buckalew =

Senator Buckalew may refer to:

- Charles R. Buckalew (1821–1899), Pennsylvania State Senate
- Jack Buckalew (1932–2016), West Virginia State Senate
- Seaborn Buckalew Jr. (1920–2017), Alaska State Senate
