= Buckalew =

Buckalew is a surname. Notable people with the surname include:

- Charles R. Buckalew (1821–1899), American lawyer and politician
- Jack Buckalew (1932–2016), American politician
- Seaborn Buckalew Jr. (1920–2017), American lawyer, politician, and judge
