= Senator Ashley =

Senator Ashley may refer to:

- Bob Ashley (born 1953), West Virginia State Senate
- Chester Ashley (1790–1848), U.S. Senator from Arkansas from 1844 to 1848
- Delos R. Ashley (1828–1873), California State Senate
