= Jack Woodrum =

American politician

Member of the West Virginia Senate from the 10th district
- Incumbent
- Assumed office December 1, 2020 Serving with Vince Deeds
- Preceded by: Kenny Mann

Personal details
- Born: Jack David Woodrum; August 4, 1963 (age 63) Hinton, West Virginia, U.S.
- Party: Republican
- Spouse: Debra Woodrum
- Education: Cincinnati College of Mortuary Science, Tyree School of Real Estate, West Virginia University

Jack David Woodrum (born August 15, 1963) is an American politician who has served as the junior West Virginia State Senator from the 10th district since 2020. Woodrum is a Republican.

== Early life, education, and career ==
Woodrum is the son of Joan Woodrum and Jack Woodrum. He received his degree in mortuary science from the Cincinnati College of Mortuary Science and also attended West Virginia University. Before seeking office, Woodrum was employed as a funeral director and mortician. He also served as the president of the Summers County commission.

== Elections ==
=== 2020 ===
In his primary election, Woodrum defeated fellow Republican Dan Hill with 62.34% of the vote. There was no incumbent in the race as Woodrum was running to fill the seat of retiring State Senator Kenny Mann.

In the general election, Woodrum defeated Democrat William Laird IV (who had previously served the 10th district) with 58.59% of the vote.

== Tenure ==
=== Committee assignments ===
- Interstate Cooperation (Chair)
- Agriculture and Rural Development (Vice chair)
- Economic Development
- Government Organization
- Health and Human Resources
- Judiciary
- Natural Resources
- Transportation and Infrastructure

As of 2020, Woodrum has a C rating from the West Virginia Citizens Defense League, a gun rights organization, and is a member of the National Rifle Association of America.

=== Worker's rights ===
Woodrum voted for SB 11, a bill that would make it more difficult for employees to strike.

=== Confederate monuments ===
In the State Senate, Woodrum was the lead sponsor of SB 685, the West Virginia Monument and Memorial Protection Act, which would prohibit the removal of Confederate monuments and memorials in West Virginia.

== Personal life ==
Woodrum is married to Debra Woodrum and has three children and one grandchild. He is a Baptist.
