= Frank Deem =

American businessman and politician

Member of the West Virginia Senate from the 3rd district
- In office December 1, 1964 – December 1, 1982
- Preceded by: J.C. Powell
- Succeeded by: Keith Burdette
- In office December 1, 1994 – December 1, 2010
- Preceded by: Keith Burdette
- Succeeded by: David Nohe

Member of the West Virginia House of Delegates
- In office December 1, 1954 – December 1, 1964
- Preceded by: Aubrey Ferguson
- Succeeded by: F. Wayne Lanham (6th district)
- Constituency: Ritchie County
- In office December 1, 1988 – December 1, 1990
- Preceded by: Ken Nowell
- Succeeded by: J.D. Beane; Larry Border; Brenda Brum; Barbara W. Sims
- Constituency: 8th district
- In office December 1, 2014 – October 10, 2018
- Preceded by: Tom Azinger; John Ellem; Daniel Poling
- Succeeded by: Tom Azinger
- Constituency: 10th district

Personal details
- Born: John Frank Deem; March 20, 1928 Harrisville, West Virginia, U.S.
- Died: October 10, 2018 (aged 90) Parkersburg, West Virginia, U.S.
- Party: Republican

J. Frank Deem (March 20, 1928 – October 10, 2018) was an American businessman and politician.

Deem was born in Harrisville, West Virginia. He served in the United States Navy. Deem received his bachelor's degree in petroleum engineering from Marietta College. He was involved in the oil and gas drilling business and was the owner of the J. F. Deem Oil and Gas Limited Liability Company. Deem lived in Vienna, West Virginia. Deem served in the West Virginia Senate from 1964 to 1978 and from 1994 to 2010. He also served in the West Virginia House of Delegates from 1954 to 1962, from 1988 to 1990, and from 2014 to his death in 2018. He was a Republican.

Deem died from pneumonia at Camden Clark Medical Center in Parkersburg, West Virginia.
