= Mike Azinger =

American politician

Member of the West Virginia Senate from the 3rd district
- Incumbent
- Assumed office December 1, 2016 Serving with Trenton Barnhart
- Preceded by: Bob Ashley

Member of the West Virginia House of Delegates from the 10th district
- In office December 1, 2014 – December 1, 2016
- Preceded by: Tom Azinger; John Ellem; Daniel Poling
- Succeeded by: Vernon Criss

Personal details
- Born: April 12, 1965 (age 61) Parkersburg, West Virginia, U.S.
- Party: Republican

Michael Thomas Azinger is an American politician. He is a Republican member of the West Virginia Senate, representing the 3rd district since January 11, 2017. Prior to this, Azinger represented the 10th District in the West Virginia House of Delegates from 2015 to 2017, succeeding his father, Tom Azinger. Prior to service in the West Virginia legislature, he was a resident of Ohio, where he ran twice for the Sixth Congressional District. In 1998, he was an unsuccessful candidate for the Republican nomination, coming in third behind Lt. Governor Nancy Hollister and former Congressman Frank Cremeans. In 2000, he won the Republican nomination, but failed in his bid to unseat Rep. Ted Strickland, taking only 40% of the vote.

Azinger attended the January 6, 2021, Stop the Steal rally near the U.S. Capitol but did not walk to or enter the building. He claimed he saw no violence and blamed "antifa" for the attack. These claims have been widely disputed; over 800 people have been convicted for their roles in the attack.

== Election results ==
West Virginia Senate District 3 (Position A) election, 2022
Party	Candidate	Votes	%
Republican	Mike Azinger (incumbent)	20,812	65.71%
Democratic	Jim Leach	10,861	34.29%
Total votes		31,673	100.0%

West Virginia Senate District 3 (Position A) election, 2018
Party	Candidate	Votes	%
Republican	Mike Azinger (incumbent)	19,964	57.40%
Democratic	Jim Leach	14,818	42.60%
Total votes		34,782	100.0%

In 2015, Republican Senator David Nohe resigned just one year into his four-year term due to family commitments. Delegate Bob Ashley was appointed to fill the seat until the next regularly scheduled election. Rather than run for the unexpired term, Ashley chose to challenge Senator Donna Boley for a full term in the Senate. As a result, area businessman Sam Winans and Delegate Azinger ran for the remaining two years on the term. Azinger beat Winans 61-39% to advance to the November general election against Democratic nominee Gregory Smith, former CEO of Mountain State Blue Cross-Blue Shield. Azinger beat Smith 55-45% to win the unexpired term.

West Virginia Senate District 3 (Position A) special election, 2016
Party	Candidate	Votes	%
Republican	Mike Azinger	23,034	54.64%
Democratic	Gregory K. Smith	19,125	45.36%
Total votes		42,159	100.0%

West Virginia Senate District 3 (Position A) Republican primary, 2016
Primary election
Party	Candidate	Votes	%
Republican	Mike Azinger	9,065	60.72%
Republican	Sam Winans	5,865	39.28%
Total votes		14,930	100.0%

West Virginia House District 10 election, 2014
Party	Candidate	Votes	%
Republican	Mike Azinger	8,375	23.48%
Republican	Frank Deem	7,479	20.96%
Republican	John R. Kelly	6,932	19.43%
Democratic	Dan Poling	5,927	16.61%
Democratic	Don Stansberry	3,886	10.89%
Democratic	Paul E. Miller	3,077	8.62%
Total votes		35,676	100.0%
