= Sarah Minear =

American politician (1941–2025)

Sarah A. Mullennex Minear (August 11, 1941 – August 26, 2025) was an American politician who served as a West Virginia state senator from 1987 to 2007.

== Life and career ==
Minear was born in Parsons, West Virginia, the daughter of John and Ruth Mullennex. She married Robert Minear and attended Fairmont State College and West Virginia University. She represented the 14th district in the senate, constituting part or all of the following counties: Grant County, Mineral County, Preston County, Taylor County, and Tucker County. She did not seek re-election in 2006.

In 2010, Minear ran for the Republican nomination for the U.S. House in West Virginia's 1st district, but came in third in the primary with 22 percent. She died in Bridgeport, West Virginia, on August 26, 2025, at the age of 84.

== See also ==
- List of members of the 77th West Virginia Senate

Preceded by unknown	West Virginia State Senator; 1987–2007	Succeeded by David Sypolt
