= Margaret Anne Staggers =

American politician (1945–2026)

Member of the West Virginia House of Delegates from the 29th district
- In office 2007–2014 Serving with David Perry and John Pino
- Preceded by: Tom Louisos

Personal details
- Born: January 12, 1945 Naval Air Station Patuxent River, St. Mary's County, Maryland, U.S.
- Died: January 1, 2026 (aged 80)
- Party: Democratic
- Spouses: Hawey Aldophus Wells Jr. (m. 1968): Robert Alexander Underwood
- Relations: Harley Orrin Staggers, Jr. (brother)
- Children: 3
- Parent: Harley Orrin Staggers, Sr. (father)
- Education: West Virginia University School of Medicine (MD)
- Occupation: Politician; emergency physician; paramedic

Margaret Anne Staggers (January 12, 1945 – January 1, 2026) was an American politician who was a Democratic member of the West Virginia House of Delegates and served as an Assistant Majority Whip. Staggers was also an emergency physician.

== Early life and education ==
Staggers was born on January 12, 1945, at Naval Air Station Patuxent River in St. Mary's County, Maryland, and was the eldest child and daughter of Harley Orrin Staggers, Sr. (August 3, 1907 – August 20, 1991) and his wife Mary Casey Staggers. At the time of her birth, Staggers' father was serving as a lieutenant commander in the United States Naval Air Corps in both the European and Pacific theaters during World War II. In 1948, Staggers' father was elected to the United States House of Representatives from West Virginia's 2nd congressional district, where he served until 1981.

She earned her M.D. in 1969 from the West Virginia University School of Medicine, after which she completed her residency in emergency medicine.

== Medical career ==
Staggers was an emergency room physician practicing at Beckley Appalachian Regional Hospital in Beckley, West Virginia. In addition to her emergency medicine practice, Staggers serves as the medical director of multiple emergency medical services and emergency operations centers in Fayette, Wyoming, Raleigh, and Boone counties in West Virginia.

She briefly considered retiring from emergency medicine at Beckley Appalachian Regional Hospital following a July 7, 2011, incident in which an elderly female patient attacked Staggers as she attempted to provide aid to the woman. The patient scratched Staggers' face, drawing blood. Staggers returned to her legislative duties in Charleston the week after the attack.

== Political activities ==
Staggers served as a delegate to the 1976 Democratic National Convention where she voted to nominate United States Senator Robert Byrd as the Democratic candidate for the 1976 United States presidential election.

=== West Virginia House of Delegates tenure ===
Staggers was elected to the West Virginia House of Delegates from the 29th district representing Fayette County, West Virginia, in 2006. She served at various points as an Assistant Majority Whip, vice-chairperson on the Roads and Transportation Committee, and a member of the Government Organization Committee, Health and Human Resources Committee, Veterans Affairs/Homeland Security Committee, and the House Select Committee on Redistricting. During the 79th session of the West Virginia Legislature, Staggers served as vice-chairperson of the Committee on Enrolled Bills.

In 2008, Staggers authored legislation extending a tax break to volunteer firefighters excusing them from tax that were due beyond what was already withheld from paychecks.

On the 30th anniversary of the passage of the Staggers Rail Act of 1980 authored by her father, Congressman Harley Orrin Staggers, Sr., Staggers wrote an op-ed in the Charleston Gazette-Mail praising the bipartisan effort in the United States Congress led by her father to deregulate the United States railroad industry.

== Affiliations ==
Staggers was a president of the West Virginia Chapter of the American College of Emergency Physicians, chairman and member of the West Virginia Chapter of the American Heart Association, and a fellow of the American College of Emergency Physicians and American Academy of Family Physicians.

== Personal life and death ==
Staggers married Hawey Adolphus Wells Jr. on June 8, 1968 in Mineral, West Virginia. She later married Robert Alexander Underwood. Her children were, Hawey Aldophus Wells III, Mary Casey Staggers Wells, Sherry Underwood Cain.

She died on January 1, 2026, at the age of 80.
