= George Ambler =

American politician

- In office 2013–2019
- Preceded by: Helen Martin
- Succeeded by: Cindy Lavender-Bowe

Member of the West Virginia House of Delegates from the 42nd district

Personal details
- Born: George "Boogie" Preston Ambler; March 8, 1950 (age 76) Alderson, West Virginia, U.S.
- Party: Republican
- Spouse: Vicky Ambler
- Education: BS, Bluefield State College

George "Boogie" Preston Ambler (born March 8, 1950) is an American politician who served as a Delegate from the 42nd District to the West Virginia House of Delegates between 2013 and 2019. Ambler is a Republican.

== Early life, education, and career ==
Ambler was born in Alderson, West Virginia. He earned his Bachelor of Science degree from Bluefield State College.

== Elections ==
=== 2012 ===
In his first primary election, Ambler was one of two Republicans, the other being Ray Canterbury, to be sent to the general in a three-way race, receiving 26.22% of the vote.

In a four-way general election, Ambler was elected with Canterbury, receiving 23.17% of the vote.

=== 2014 ===
Like in 2012, Ambler was sent to the general with Canterbury, receiving 44.75% of the vote.

In the general, Ambler was reelected alongside Canterbury, receiving 28.88% of the vote.

=== 2016 ===
In the 2016 primary, Ambler received 44.95% of the vote.

In the general, Ambler received 33.59% of the vote to be elected alongside Democrat Stephen Baldwin.

=== 2018 ===
In 2018, Ambler sought the nomination for West Virginia's 10th Senate district, where the incumbent was not seeking reelection. In the primary, he defeated Republican Dan Hill with 56.45% of the vote.

In the general, Ambler faced fellow 42nd District Delegate Stephen Baldwin and lost with 46.85% of the vote. He left his office as Delegate from the 42nd District thereafter.

== Tenure ==
=== Committee assignments ===
==== 2013 session ====
- Roads and Transportation
- Education
- Agriculture

==== 2015 session ====
- Agriculture and Natural Resources (Vice chair)
- Education
- Energy
- Roads and Transportation

==== 2017 session ====
- Agriculture and Natural Resources (Vice chair)
- Finance
- Roads and Transportation

=== Flooding ===
Ambler was appointed the House Chairman of the newly created Joint Legislative Committee on Flooding in response to the 2016 West Virginia flood and sponsored several pieces of legislation pertaining to flooding in West Virginia.

=== Candidate Ratings ===
In 2018, Ambler had a 93% rating from the American Conservative Union and a 76% lifetime rating.

Ambler also had a 84.6% rating from the West Virginia division of the United States Chamber of Commerce in 2018.

In 2016, Ambler had only a 10% rating from the West Virginia chapter of the Sierra Club.

== Personal life ==
Ambler is married to Vicky Ambler and has two children. He is a Methodist.
