= Stephen Baldwin (politician) =

American politician

Minority Leader of the West Virginia Senate
- In office January 13, 2021 – December 1, 2022
- Preceded by: Roman Prezioso
- Succeeded by: Mike Woelfel

Member of the West Virginia Senate from the 10th district
- In office October 16, 2017 – December 1, 2022
- Preceded by: Ronald F. Miller
- Succeeded by: Vince Deeds

Member of the West Virginia House of Delegates from the 42nd district
- In office January 11, 2017 – October 16, 2017
- Preceded by: Ray Canterbury
- Succeeded by: Jeff Campbell

Personal details
- Born: January 13, 1982 (age 44) Pinehurst, North Carolina, U.S.
- Party: Democratic
- Education: City University of New York, Queens (BA); Vanderbilt University (MDiv)

Stephen Baldwin Jr. is an American politician and former Democratic member of the West Virginia Senate, representing the 10th district from 2016 to 2022. During the 85th Legislature, Baldwin served as the Senate Minority Leader. Baldwin was the third Minority Leader since the Republicans took the majority in the Senate in 2014.

Prior to his appointment to the State Senate, Baldwin represented the 42nd District in the West Virginia House of Delegates, and was a member of the Greenbrier County Board of Education.

In 2022, Baldwin lost re-election to Vince Deeds, becoming one of only two state legislative leaders to lose re-election in 2022.

== Political career ==
=== West Virginia House of Delegates ===
In 2016, Baldwin ran unopposed for the Democratic nomination in the 42nd House District, which encompassed the majority of Greenbrier County, as well as portions of Monroe and Summers counties. Baldwin faced incumbent Delegates George Ambler and Ray Canterbury in the general election. Running on his strength in his home Greenbrier County, Baldwin secured first place in the two-member district, ousting incumbent Republican delegate Ray Canterbury in the three-way race.

West Virginia House District 42 election, 2016
Party	Candidate	Votes	%
Democratic	Stephen Baldwin	7,422	34.21%
Republican	George Ambler (incumbent)	7,287	33.59%
Republican	Ray Canterbury (incumbent)	6,984	32.19%
Total votes		21,693	100.0%

=== West Virginia Senate ===
After serving just 10 months in the House of Delegates, Baldwin was appointed by Governor Jim Justice in October 2017 to a West Virginia Senate seat from District 10. He replaced state senator Ron Miller, who resigned to take a role in the Justice administration advising on agricultural issues.

==== 2018 ====
Baldwin ran for a full term in 2018 and was unopposed in the Democratic primary. Baldwin faced his former colleague, Republican Delegate George Ambler in the November general election, who he beat 53-47%.

West Virginia Senate District 10 (Position A) election, 2018
Party	Candidate	Votes	%
Democratic	Stephen Baldwin (incumbent)	17,495	53.15%
Republican	George Ambler	15,421	46.85%
Total votes		32,916	100.0%

==== 2022 ====
Baldwin ran for reelection in 2022, running unopposed in the Democratic primary. In the general election, Baldwin faced former West Virginia State Trooper Vince Deeds and Independent Candidate Aaron Ransom and lost to Deeds 38-59%.

West Virginia Senate District 10 (Position A) election, 2022
Party	Candidate	Votes	%
Republican	Vince Deeds	18,887	59.0%
Democratic	Stephen Baldwin (incumbent)	12,010	38.0%
Independent	Aaron Ransom	1,079	3.0%
Total votes		39,976	100%

West Virginia Senate
Preceded by Roman Prezioso	Minority Leader of the West Virginia Senate; 2021–2022	Succeeded by Mike Woelfel
