= Kenny Mann =

American politician

Member of the West Virginia Senate from the 10th district
- In office January 11, 2017 – December 1, 2020
- Preceded by: William Laird IV
- Succeeded by: Jack Woodrum

Personal details
- Born: Bluefield, West Virginia, U.S.
- Party: Republican
- Education: Concord University (B.A.)
- Profession: Funeral director

Kenny W. Mann is a politician who served as a member of the West Virginia Senate from the 10th district from 2017 to 2020. Mann is a former Member of the Monroe County Board of Education.

== Education ==
Mann holds an associate degree in Mortuary science from Mid-America College of Funeral Service and a Bachelor's degree in Business Administration from Concord University.

== Committees ==
Mann serves as Chairman of the West Virginia Senate Education Committee. Mann serves as the Vice Chairman of the Natural Resources Committee and holds a place in Agriculture and Rural Development, Banking and Insurance, Economic Development, and Finance Committees.

== Election results ==
West Virginia Senate District 10 (Position B) election, 2016
Party	Candidate	Votes	%
Republican	Kenny Mann	21,148	54.73%
Democratic	David Perry	17,494	45.27%
Total votes		38,642	100.0%
