= Vince Deeds =

American politician

Member of the West Virginia Senate from the 10th district
- Incumbent
- Assumed office December 1, 2022 Serving with Jack Woodrum
- Preceded by: Stephen Baldwin

Personal details
- Born: July 15, 1970 (age 56) Beckley, West Virginia, U.S.
- Party: Republican
- Education: Virginia Tech (BS); FBI National Academy University of Virginia (M.Psych.)

Vincent S. Deeds is a Republican member of the West Virginia Senate, representing the 10th district, and a retired West Virginia state trooper and pastor.

== Early life ==
Deeds grew up on a dairy farm in Jumping Branch, West Virginia, and attended Summers County High School. After graduating high school, Deeds attended Virginia Polytechnic Institute and State University (Virginia Tech).

== Career ==
=== West Virginia State Police ===
Vince Deeds started his career with the West Virginia State Police (WVSP) in 1994 and retired in 2019 after twenty-five years of service. He retired as a lieutenant colonel. During his career, he served as detachment commander, inspector, sniper team commander, troop commander, and chief of staff services. Deeds was also a member of the WVSP Special Operations unit and a graduate of the FBI National Academy.

=== Retirement ===
After Deeds retired from the West Virginia State Police in 2019, he began working for the Greenbrier County Board of Education as director of safety and security and the Greenbrier County Prosecutor's Office as chief investigator. In 2021, he announced his candidacy for the West Virginia State Senate. Deeds is also the pastor of Sinks Grove Baptist Church in Sinks Grove, West Virginia.

== Elections ==
=== West Virginia Senate ===
==== 2022 ====
In July 2021, Deeds announced his candidacy for West Virginia's 10th Senatorial District and was elected on November 8, 2022. After winning the Republican nomination, Deeds challenged State Senate Minority Leader Stephen Baldwin, and won 58.7-37.9%.

2022 West Virginia 10th Senatorial District Republican Primary
Party	Candidate	Votes	%
Republican	Vince Deeds	4,924	48.9%
Republican	Mike Steadham	4,228	42.0%
Republican	Thomas Perkins	920	9.1%
Total votes		10,072	100.0%

West Virginia Senate District 10 (Position A) election, 2022
Party	Candidate	Votes	%
Republican	Vince Deeds	18,887	58.7%
Democratic	Stephen Baldwin (incumbent)	12,010	37.9%
Independent	Aaron Ransom	1,079	3.0%
Total votes		39,976	100%

== Personal life ==
Vince Deeds is married to his wife, Michelle, who is the director of nursing at Pocahontas Memorial Hospital, and has two sons, Justin, a Lewisburg PD officer, and Tristan, a West Point cadet. They reside in Renick, West Virginia.
