= 2010 United States House of Representatives elections in West Virginia =

- November 2, 2010

All 3 West Virginia seats to the United States House of Representatives
	Majority party	Minority party
Party	Republican	Democratic
Last election	1	2
Seats won	2	1
Seat change	▲1	▼1
Popular vote	283,085	227,857
Percentage	55.03%	44.30%
Swing	▲21.98%	▼22.63%

Republican
50–60%
60–70%
70–80%
Democratic
50–60%
60–70%
70–80%

The 2010 congressional elections in West Virginia were held on November 2, 2010, to determine who would represent the state of West Virginia in the United States House of Representatives. Representatives are elected for two-year terms; the elected served in the 112th Congress from January 2011 until January 2013.

West Virginia has three seats in the House, apportioned according to the 2000 United States census. Its 2009-2010 congressional delegation consisted of two Democrats and one Republican, though following the election, its delegation consisted of two Republicans and one Democrat.

== Overview ==
United States House of Representatives elections in West Virginia, 2010
Party	Votes	Percentage	Seats	+/–
Republican	283,085	55.03%	2	+1
Democratic	227,857	44.30%	1	-1
Constitution	3,431	0.67%	0	—
Totals	514,373	100.00%	3	—

=== By district ===
Results of the 2010 United States House of Representatives elections in West Virginia by district:

District	Republican		Democratic		Others		Total		Result
District	Votes	%	Votes	%	Votes	%	Votes	%	Result
District 1	90,660	50.40%	89,220	49.60%	0	0.00%	179,880	100%	Republican Gain
District 2	126,814	68.46%	55,001	29.69%	3,431	1.85%	185,246	100%	Republican Hold
District 3	65,611	43.96%	83,636	56.04%	0	0.00%	149,247	100%	Democratic Hold
Total	283,085	55.03%	227,857	44.30%	3,431	0.67%	514,373	100%	

== District 1 ==
2010 West Virginia's 1st congressional district election
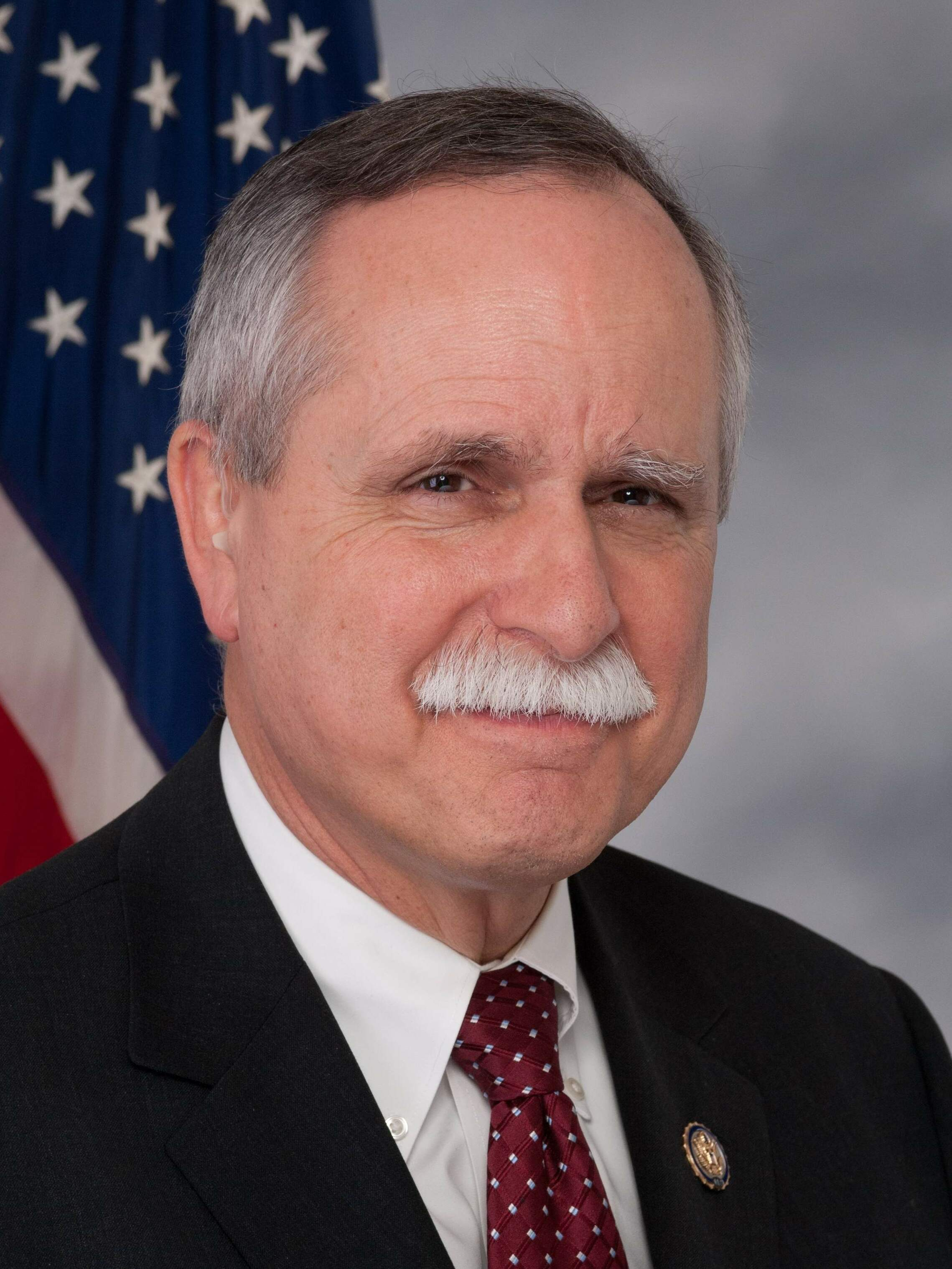

Nominee	David McKinley	Mike Oliverio
Party	Republican	Democratic
Popular vote	90,660	89,220
Percentage	50.40%	49.60%
- County results McKinley: 50–60% 60–70% 70–80% Oliverio: 50–60% 60–70%
U.S. Representative before election
Alan Mollohan
Democratic
Elected U.S. Representative
David McKinley
Republican

This conservative district, rooted in the northern counties of West Virginia, had been represented by moderate Democrat Alan Mollohan since he was first elected to replace his father, Bob Mollohan, in 1982. Although John McCain won the district with 58% of the vote in 2008, Mollohan had run unopposed that same year, highlighting Democratic strength amidst changing coalitions.

Running for a fifteenth term, Mollohan faced a serious challenge in the Democratic primary from state Senator Mike Oliverio. Initially, few saw Oliverio as having a credible chance, owing to his late entry into the race, and his decision to run as a more conservative candidate.

Mollohan had previously faced ethics questions on whether he had given earmarks to businesses owned by his friends, earning him criticism from Oliverio as "one of the most corrupt congressmen" and a creature of Washington. Mollohan also faced criticism for some of his votes in Congress. Votes such as those in favor of the Affordable Care Act, and vacillation before ultimately voting against a cap and trade bill, cost him goodwill with formerly allied interest groups and local newspapers.

Mollohan attacked Oliverio as being a Republican running as a Democrat, and focused on his membership in the American Legislative Exchange Council, a conservative lobbying group. Polls from both camps showed different results, and Mollohan raised more money than Oliverio. Ultimately, Congressman Mollohan would be defeated by Oliverio, taking around 44% of the vote to Oliverio's 56%, becoming the first House incumbent to lose that cycle. Mollohan attributed his loss, in part, to attacks by Oliverio he referred to as "totally spurious and totally false", but also acknowledged that the environment had turned strongly against incumbents.

Democratic primary results by county: Oliverio: 50–60%; 60–70%; Mollohan: 50–60%; 60–70%

Democratic Primary Results
Party	Candidate	Votes	%
Democratic	Mike Oliverio	36,135	55.91%
Democratic	Alan Mollohan (incumbent)	28,500	44.09%
Total votes		64,635	100.0%

In the general election, Oliverio, faced Republican nominee David McKinley, a former member of the West Virginia House of Delegates and a former chair of the West Virginia Republican Party. McKinley emerged as the establishment favorite against former state senator Sarah Minear, and both spent sizable amounts of their own money on the race. Both candidates saw their past voting record come under scrutiny, particularly on tax issues. However, a third contender emerged in future West Virginia Secretary of State Mac Warner. Warner was seen as likely to siphon votes from Minear, though in the last days of the race, he faced scrutiny for allegations that his businesses owed nearly $3 million in taxes. McKinley would emerge the victor by 8 points.

Republican Primary Results
Party	Candidate	Votes	%
Republican	David B. McKinley	14,783	34.86%
Republican	Andrew Warner	11,353	26.77%
Republican	Sarah Minear	8,994	21.21%
Republican	Thomas Frederick Stark	3,636	8.57%
Republican	Patricia Carol Levenson	2,110	4.98%
Republican	Cynthia Hall	1,533	3.61%
Total votes		42,409	100.0%

Republican primary results by county: McKinley: 30–40%; 40–50%; 50–60%; 70–80%; Warner: 20–30%; 30–40%; Minear: 20–30%; 30–40%; 40–50%; 50–60%

=== General election ===
In a year that saw a strong anti-incumbent trend, Oliverio's outsider status was a boon to him, and to some strategists, this made him a stronger candidate than Mollohan would have been. As, Republicans would have preferred to face a bruised Mollohan, an Oliverio campaign was going to prove to be a different challenge for Republicans.

But Oliverio faced serious headwinds, particularly among his party. For one, his refusal to outright back Nancy Pelosi for Speaker of the House was a sticking point among Democratic leaders, and he would eventually shift away from this rhetoric in the late stages of the campaign. He also had trouble winning support with traditional Democratic groups such as the United Mine Workers of America and AFL-CIO, who had supported Mollohan and had endorsed every other Democrat running for Congress in the state except Oliverio. Former West Virginia Secretary of State Ken Hechler, whom Oliverio had tried to primary in 2004, launched a PAC targeting him.

McKinley, meanwhile, boosted by a strong Republican sentiment, made the race into a referendum against Democratic leaders such as Pelosi and Barack Obama, capitalizing on strong outsider sentiment. The campaign between the two was marred by barbs relating to establishment Washington figures. In a debate, McKinley would accuse his Democratic opponent of supporting the agenda of Nancy Pelosi and Barack Obama—to which Oliverio responded: "I am not going to Washington to get in touch with the Washington leadership. I'm going to Washington to get the national leadership in step with the people of West Virginia."

Even with a strong national Republican environment, polls in the closing weeks showed a tight race. Fundraising also showed a close but narrow McKinley lead. In the end, Oliverio lost the election by a 0.8% margin. This was the first time a Republican would win this district since 1966.

==== Predictions ====
Source	Ranking	As of
The Cook Political Report	Tossup	November 1, 2010
Rothenberg	Tossup	November 1, 2010
Sabato's Crystal Ball	Lean R (flip)	November 1, 2010
RCP	Tossup	November 1, 2010
CQ Politics	Tossup	October 28, 2010
New York Times	Tossup	November 1, 2010
FiveThirtyEight	Tossup	November 1, 2010

West Virginia's 1st congressional district election, 2010
Party	Candidate	Votes	%
Republican	David McKinley	90,660	50.40
Democratic	Mike Oliverio	89,220	49.60
Total votes		179,880	100.00
Republican gain from Democratic			

==== Aftermath ====
Oliverio has been a registered Republican since joining that party in January 2018. He lost a general election bid that year for West Virginia’s 13th State Senate district to incumbent Democrat Bob Beach but made a comeback in 2022 by winning that seat when Beach retired.

== District 2 ==
2010 West Virginia's 2nd congressional district election
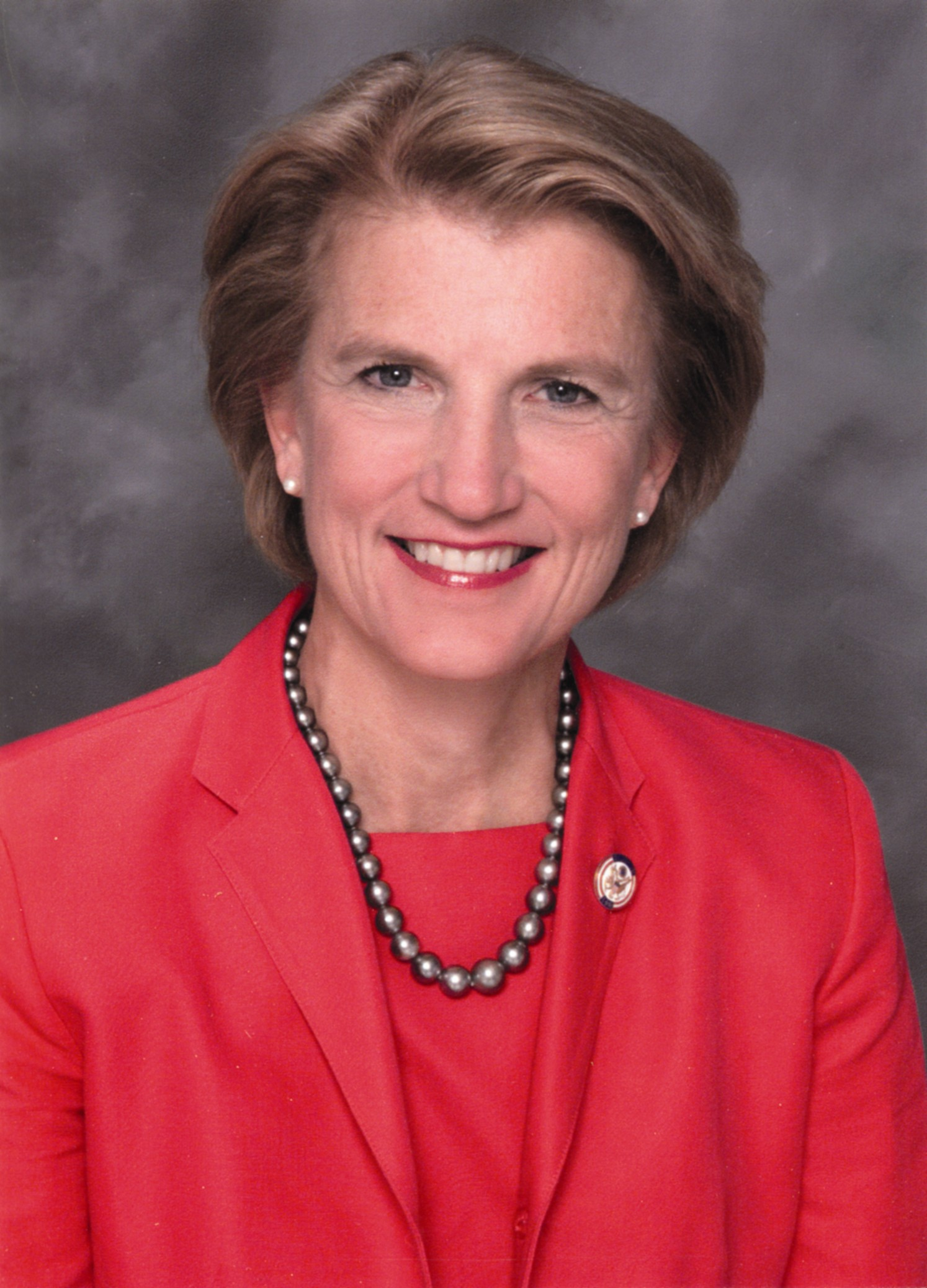

Nominee	Shelley Moore Capito	Virginia Lynch Graf
Party	Republican	Democratic
Popular vote	126,814	55,001
Percentage	68.46%	29.69%
- County results Capito: 50–60% 60–70% 70–80%
U.S. Representative before election
Shelley Moore Capito
Republican
Elected U.S. Representative
Shelley Moore Capito
Republican

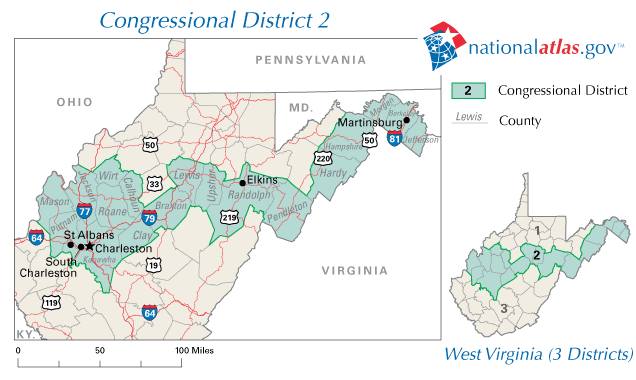

This conservative district, which stretched from metro Charleston in western West Virginia to the Potomac River in the eastern region of the state, has been represented by Republican Congresswoman Shelley Moore Capito since 2001. Although Capito faced serious challenges to her re-election in 2006 and 2008, she was not seen as vulnerable this year, with The New York Times declaring this a safe Republican race.

During the race, longtime Senator Robert Byrd died, and Capito was seen as the strongest candidate to challenge Joe Manchin in the special election to fill out the remainder of Byrd's term. Ultimately, Capito declined to enter the race, choosing to run for re-election.

She faced Democratic nominee Virginia Lynch Graf and Constitution Party candidate Phil Hudok in the general election, whom she was able to defeat in an overwhelming landslide to win a sixth term in Congress.

Democratic Primary Results
Party	Candidate	Votes	%
Democratic	Virginia Lynch Graf	29,579	100.00%
Total votes		29,579	100.00%

Republican Primary Results
Party	Candidate	Votes	%
Republican	Shelley Moore Capito (incumbent)	27,958	100.00%
Total votes		27,958	100.0%

=== Predictions ===
Source	Ranking	As of
The Cook Political Report	Safe R	November 1, 2010
Rothenberg	Safe R	November 1, 2010
Sabato's Crystal Ball	Safe R	November 1, 2010
RCP	Safe R	November 1, 2010
CQ Politics	Safe R	October 28, 2010
New York Times	Safe R	November 1, 2010
FiveThirtyEight	Safe R	November 1, 2010

West Virginia's 2nd congressional district election, 2010
Party	Candidate	Votes	%
Republican	Shelley Moore Capito (incumbent)	126,814	68.46
Democratic	Virginia Lynch Graf	55,001	29.69
Constitution	Phil Hudok	3,431	1.85
Total votes		185,246	100.00
Republican hold			

== District 3 ==
2010 West Virginia's 3rd congressional district election
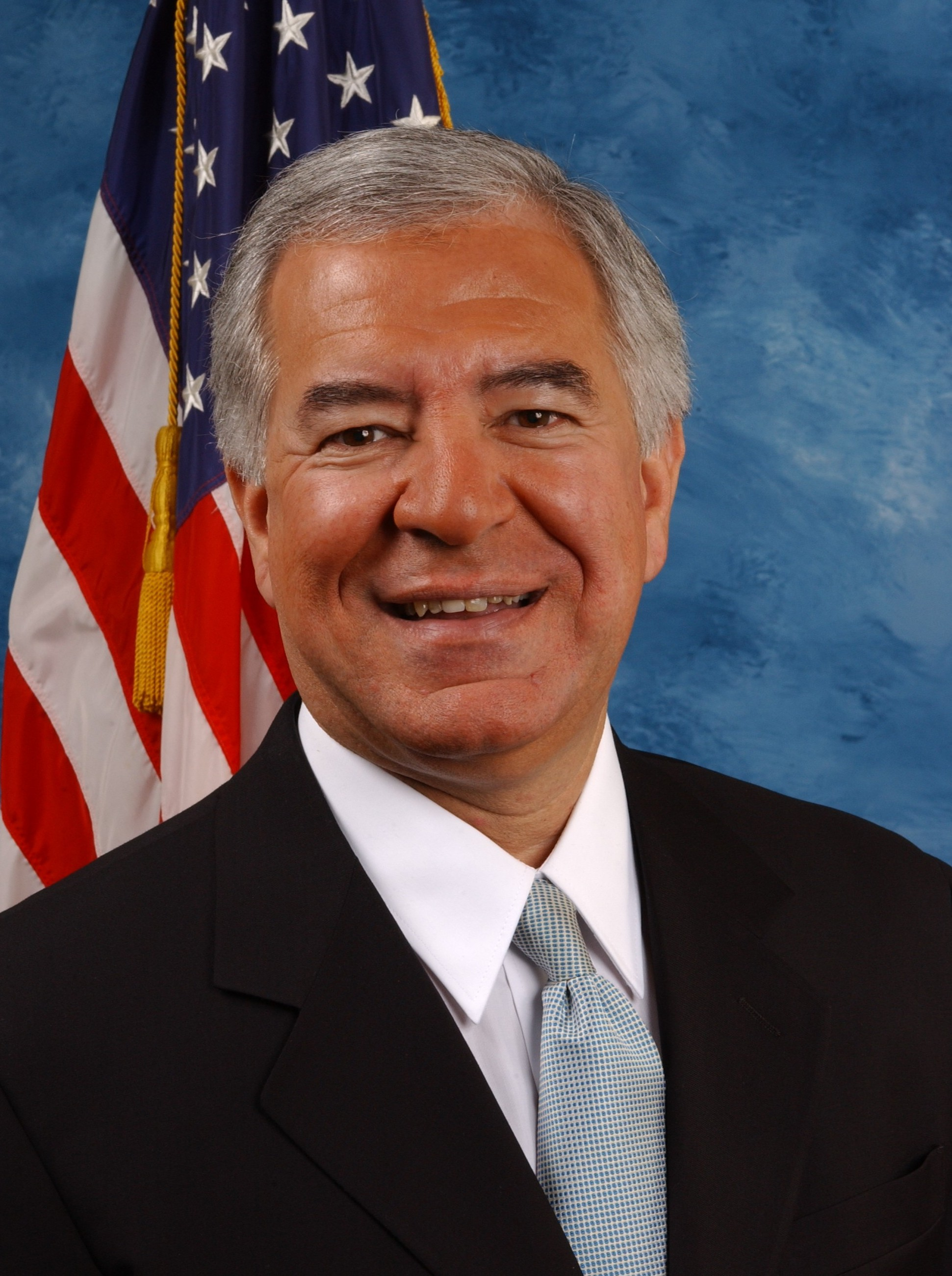

Nominee	Nick Rahall	Spike Maynard
Party	Democratic	Republican
Popular vote	83,636	65,611
Percentage	56.04%	43.96%
- County results Rahall: 50–60% 60–70% 70–80% Maynard: 50–60%
U.S. Representative before election
Nick Rahall
Democratic
Elected U.S. Representative
Nick Rahall
Democratic

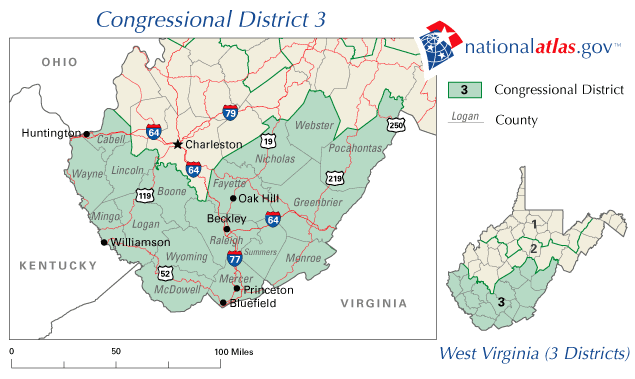

Incumbent Democratic Congressman Nick Rahall had represented this conservative-leaning district, based in the southern portion of the state since he was initially elected in 1976. Rahall had not faced a serious challenge holding onto the state's most Democratic-leaning district since 1990. However, 2010 would prove to be his toughest fight yet.

In the primary, Rahall faced the threat of a primary from state Delegate Ralph Rodighiero, who ultimately would not challenge him. The only primary challenger he would face was Bruce Barilla, who criticized Rahall's "support" for Barack Obama, and his vote for the Matthew Shepard and James Byrd Jr. Hate Crimes Prevention Act. Rahall won the primary with two-thirds of the vote, and Barilla would go on to endorse Rahall's Republican opponent Spike Maynard.

Democratic Primary Results
Party	Candidate	Votes	%
Democratic	Nick Rahall (incumbent)	44,929	67.51%
Democratic	Bruce Barilla	21,620	32.49%
Total votes		66,549	100.0%

Republican Primary Results
Party	Candidate	Votes	%
Republican	Spike Maynard	5,056	30.05%
Republican	Gary Gearhart	4,623	27.48%
Republican	Conrad Gale Lucas II	4,238	25.19%
Republican	Lee Allen Bias	2,906	17.27%
Total votes		16,823	100.0%

=== General election ===
==== Predictions ====
Source	Ranking	As of
The Cook Political Report	Likely D	November 1, 2010
Rothenberg	Safe D	November 1, 2010
Sabato's Crystal Ball	Likely D	November 1, 2010
RCP	Likely D	November 1, 2010
CQ Politics	Likely D	October 28, 2010
New York Times	Lean D	November 1, 2010
FiveThirtyEight	Likely D	November 1, 2010

Maynard was a former Democrat and a defeated former member of the Supreme Court of Appeals of West Virginia. He had narrowly prevailed in the primary by 433 votes over opponent Marty Gearhart. He had been defeated as a state justice in 2008, due to photos circulating of Maynard and the executive of an energy company Don Blankenship, socializing at a time when Massey, Blankenship's company, had cases before the state's Supreme Court. Rahall would launch ads targeting Maynard and Blankenship's relationship.

Rahall also found himself the subject of negative attacks. One advertisement claimed that Rahall, who is of Lebanese descent, was "good for the Middle East" but "bad for America". Maynard also claimed that Rahall had received "money from a convicted terrorist," although Republican candidates such as George W. Bush also received money from the same individual; Rahall donated the contribution to charity. Despite these attacks, Rahall maintained a significant lead in polls. In the end, Rahall defeated Maynard and won an eighteenth term in Congress.

West Virginia's 3rd congressional district election, 2010
Party	Candidate	Votes	%
Democratic	Nick Rahall (incumbent)	83,636	56.04
Republican	Spike Maynard	65,611	43.96
Total votes		149,247	100.00
Democratic hold			
