= Col. William Henderson French House =

Historic house in West Virginia, United States

- U.S. National Register of Historic Places
- Location within West Virginia Location within the United States
- Location: South of Athens off WV 20, near Athens, West Virginia
- Coordinates: 37°23′46″N 81°1′36″W
- Area: 5 acres (2.0 ha)
- Built: 1855
- Architectural style: Greek Revival
- NRHP reference No.: 76001940
- Added to NRHP: March 12, 1976

Col. William Henderson French House, also known as "Legend Valley Farm," is a historic home located near Athens, Mercer County, West Virginia. It was built about 1855, and is a three-story, frame dwelling with an ell with Greek Revival overtones. It sits on a sandstone foundation and features porches with small, rounded columns and railings of various designs.

It was listed on the National Register of Historic Places in 1976.
