= Ryan Weld =

American politician (born 1980)

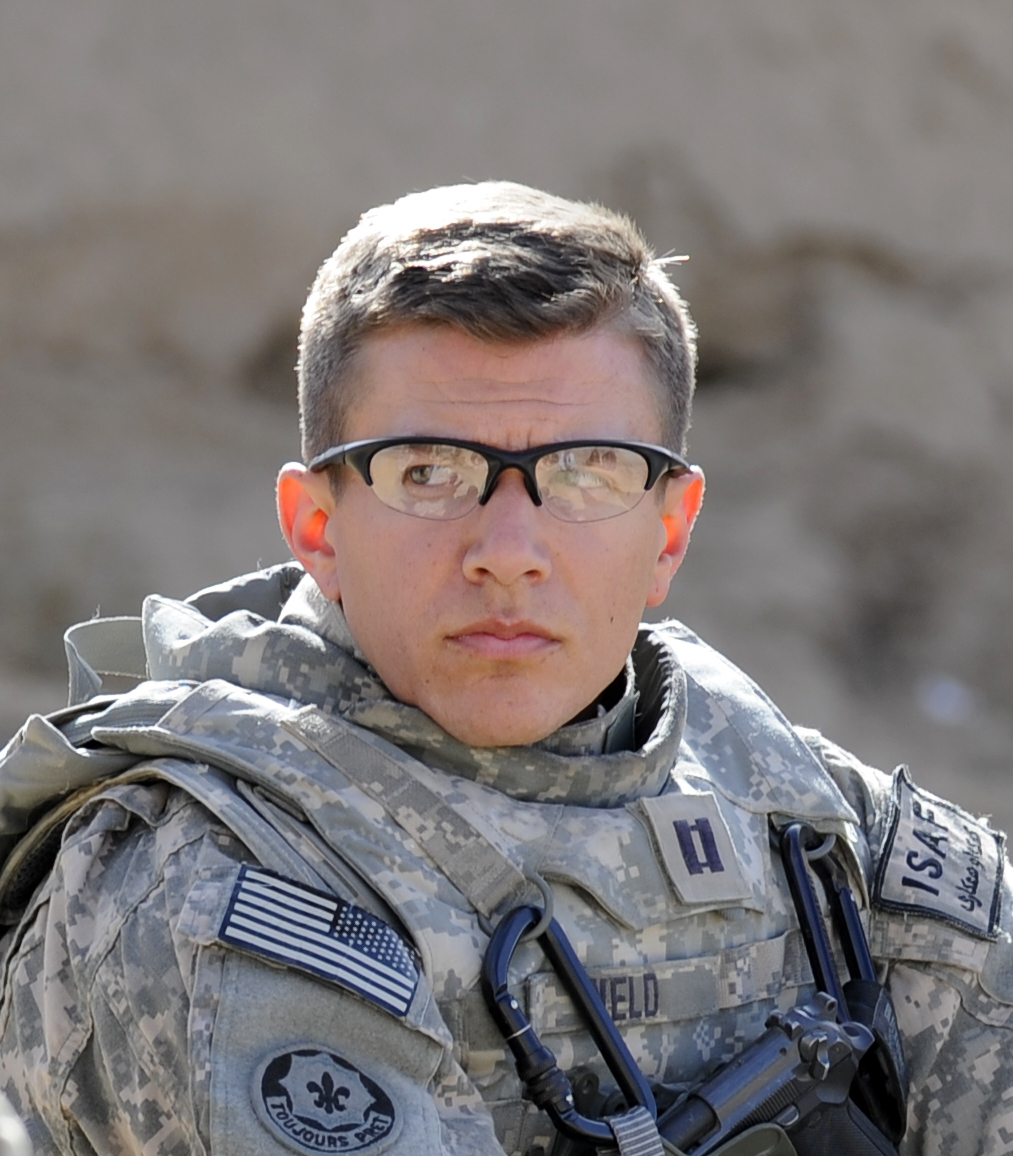

Majority Whip of the West Virginia Senate
- In office August 30, 2017 – January 8, 2025
- President: Mitch Carmichael; Craig Blair
- Preceded by: Craig Blair
- Succeeded by: Jay Taylor

Member of the West Virginia Senate from the 1st district
- Incumbent
- Assumed office December 1, 2016 Serving with Laura Chapman
- Preceded by: Jack Yost

Member of the West Virginia House of Delegates from the 2nd district
- In office December 1, 2014 – December 1, 2016
- Preceded by: Phil Diserio
- Succeeded by: Phil Diserio

Personal details
- Born: May 19, 1980 (age 46) Wellsburg, West Virginia
- Party: Republican
- Education: Fairmont State University

Military service
- Allegiance: United States
- Branch/service: United States Air Force
- Rank: Captain
- Unit: Air Force Reserve

Ryan William Weld (born May 19, 1980) is a Republican member of the West Virginia Senate for the 1st district. He previously served in the West Virginia House of Delegates. He was appointed whip in 2017.

== Biography ==
Weld was born in Wellsburg, West Virginia, where he still resides. He graduated from Fairmont State University in 2003. Weld is a prosecuting attorney and Captain in the Air Force Reserve.

Weld was elected to the House of Delegates in 2014, defeating incumbent Phil Diserio. In November 2015, he announced his candidacy for the Senate in the 2016 election. Weld won the Republican primary unopposed, and defeated incumbent Democrat Jack Yost in the general election. In 2020, Weld was unsuccessfully opposed in the primary by Jack Newbrough.

Weld presented Speaker John Bercow with a copy of The West Virginia State Capitol Building, a book of photography by Thorney Lieberman.

== Electoral history ==
West Virginia House District 2 election, 2014
| Party | Candidate | Votes | % |
|---|---|---|---|
| Republican | Ryan Weld | 2,846 | 59.62 |
| Democratic | Phil Diserio | 1,928 | 40.39 |
| Total votes | | 4,774 | 100.00 |

West Virginia Senate District 1, Position B Republican primary, 2016
| Party | Candidate | Votes | % |
|---|---|---|---|
| Republican | Ryan Weld | 8,914 | 100.00 |
| Total votes | | 8,914 | 100.00 |

West Virginia Senate District 1, Position B election, 2016
| Party | Candidate | Votes | % |
|---|---|---|---|
| Republican | Ryan Weld | 21,191 | 51.07 |
| Democratic | Jack Yost | 20,303 | 48.93 |
| Total votes | | 41,494 | 100.00 |

West Virginia Senate District 1, Position B Republican primary, 2020
| Party | Candidate | Votes | % |
|---|---|---|---|
| Republican | Ryan Weld | 7,283 | 64.09 |
| Republican | Jack Newbrough | 4,081 | 35.91 |
| Total votes | | 11,364 | 100.00 |
