= David Sypolt =

American politician

Member of the West Virginia Senate from the 14th district
- In office December 1, 2006 – December 1, 2022
- Preceded by: Sarah Minear
- Succeeded by: Jay Taylor

Personal details
- Born: September 28, 1964 (age 62) Morgantown, West Virginia, U.S.
- Party: Republican
- Spouse: Divorced
- Children: Joshua; Tara; Uriah
- Education: Glenville State College (A.S., B.A.)
- Occupation: Surveyor

David Sypolt is a former Republican West Virginia state senator from the 14th district who represented part or all of the following counties: Barbour County, Grant County, Hardy County, Mineral County, Monongalia County, Preston County, Taylor County, and Tucker County. He was elected to his first term in 2006.

== Education ==
In 1988 he received his AS in Land Surveying Technology from Glenville State College and years later in 2004, he received his BA from Glenville State College.

== Personal life ==
Sypolt is married and has three adult children. Sypolt currently lives in Kingwood, West Virginia. Sypolt is a Baptist Christian.

== Organizations ==
- American Congress on Surveying and Mapping (ACSM);
- National Society of Professional Surveyors (NSPS);
- West Virginia Society of Professional Surveyors (WVSPS);
- National Rifle Association (NRA) - life member;
- West Virginia Citizens Defense League (WVCDL)

== See also ==
- List of members of the 79th West Virginia Senate

Preceded by Sarah Minear	West Virginia state senator 2006–2022	Succeeded by Jay Taylor
