= Athens, West Virginia =

- Town
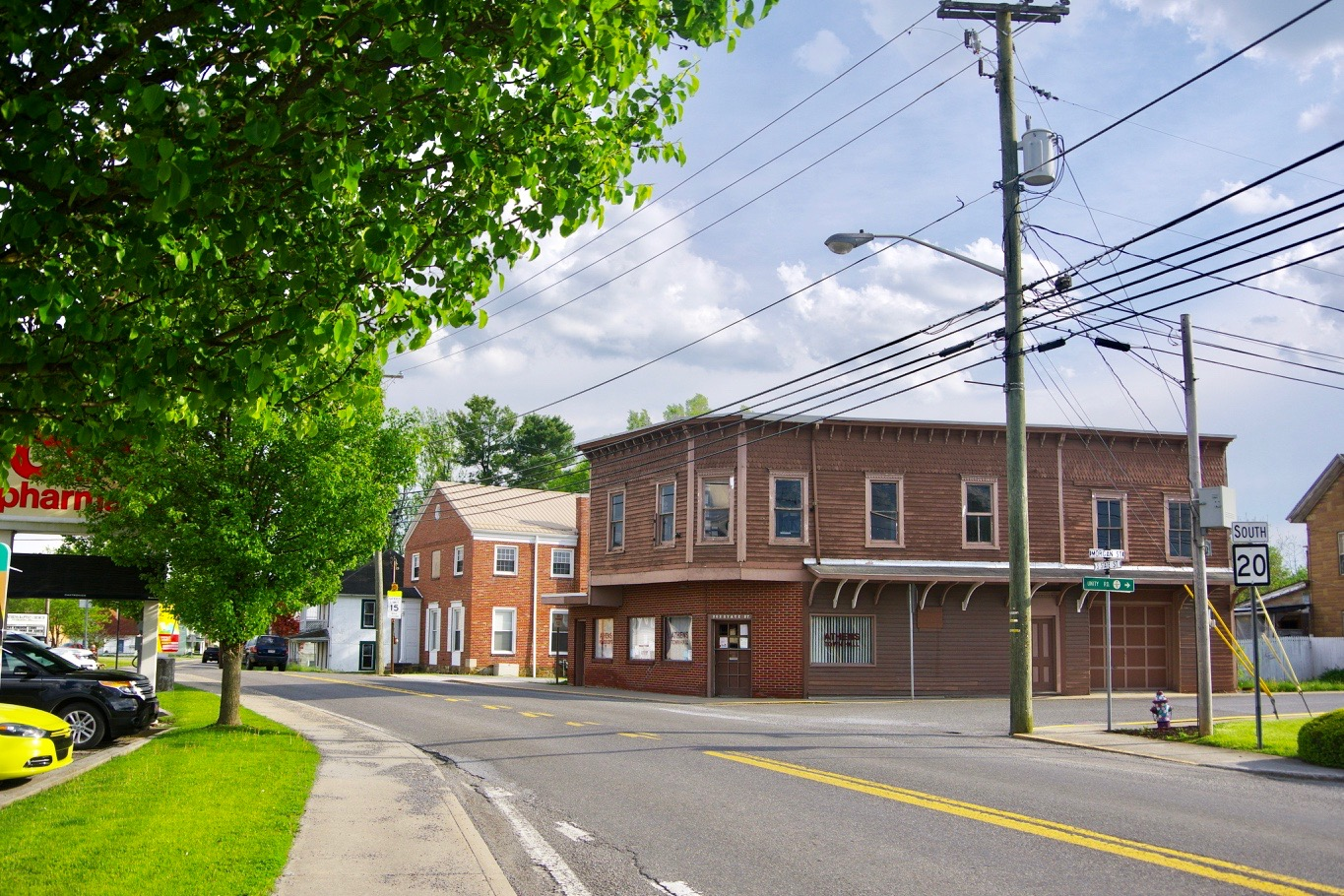
- View along State Street; Town Hall on the right

- Flag Seal

- Location of Athens in Mercer County, West Virginia.
- Coordinates: 37°25′23″N 81°00′54″W
- Country: United States
- State: West Virginia
- County: Mercer
- Incorporated: 1906

Area
  - Total: 0.39 sq mi (1.02 km^{2})
  - Land: 0.39 sq mi (1.02 km^{2})
  - Water: 0 sq mi (0.00 km^{2})
- Elevation: 2,582 ft (787 m)

Population (2020)
  - Total: 962
  - Estimate (2021): 933
  - Density: 2,278.5/sq mi (879.74/km^{2})
- Time zone: UTC-5 (Eastern (EST))
  - Summer (DST): UTC-4 (EDT)
- ZIP code: 24712
- Area code: 304
- FIPS code: 54-03292
- GNIS feature ID: 2390709
- Website: www.townofathens.com

Athens is a town in Mercer County, West Virginia, United States. The population was 944 at the 2020 census. It is part of the Bluefield micropolitan area which has a population of 107,578. Athens is the home of Concord University.

== History ==
The community was named Concord; however, in 1896 another post office in Concord, Hampshire County, West Virginia was established and the town's name was changed to Athens after the Greek city and center of learning. The community incorporated as a town on August 6, 1906.

Located near Athens is the Col. William Henderson French House, listed on the National Register of Historic Places in 1976.

== Geography ==
The town is situated on a bluff above Laurel Creek, a tributary of the Bluestone River. The campus of Concord University lies at the eastern end of town. West Virginia Route 20 (State Street) traverses Athens, connecting the town with Princeton to the southwest and the rural towns along New River to the northeast.

According to the United States Census Bureau, the town has a total area of 0.39 square miles (1.01 km^{2}), all land.

== Climate ==
The climate in this area has mild differences between highs and lows, and there is adequate rainfall year-round. According to the Köppen Climate Classification system, Athens has a marine west coast climate, abbreviated "Cfb" on climate maps.

Climate data for Athens, West Virginia
Month	Jan	Feb	Mar	Apr	May	Jun	Jul	Aug	Sep	Oct	Nov	Dec	Year
Mean daily maximum °F (°C)	40 (4)	44 (7)	53 (12)	63 (17)	71 (22)	77 (25)	81 (27)	80 (27)	74 (23)	65 (18)	54 (12)	44 (7)	62 (17)
Mean daily minimum °F (°C)	20 (−7)	21 (−6)	28 (−2)	37 (3)	47 (8)	55 (13)	59 (15)	57 (14)	51 (11)	39 (4)	31 (−1)	24 (−4)	39 (4)
Average precipitation inches (mm)	2.95 (75)	2.72 (69)	3.27 (83)	3.31 (84)	3.86 (98)	3.23 (82)	3.9 (99)	3.07 (78)	2.99 (76)	2.52 (64)	2.8 (71)	2.68 (68)	37.3 (947)
Source: U.S. Climate Data

== Demographics ==
Historical population
Census	Pop.	Note	%±
1910	575		—
1920	552		−4.0%
1930	628		13.8%
1940	682		8.6%
1950	935		37.1%
1960	1,086		16.1%
1970	967		−11.0%
1980	1,147		18.6%
1990	741		−35.4%
2000	1,102		48.7%
2010	1,048		−4.9%
2020	962		−8.2%
2021 (est.)	933	▼	−3.0%
U.S. Decennial Census

=== 2010 census ===
As of the census of 2010, there were 1,048 people, 347 households, and 182 families living in the town. The population density was 2,687.2 inhabitants per square mile (1,037.5/km^{2}). There were 408 housing units at an average density of 1,046.2 per square mile (403.9/km^{2}). The racial makeup of the town was 91.1% White, 5.6% African American, 0.1% Native American, 2.1% Asian, 0.2% from other races, and 0.9% from two or more races. Hispanic or Latino of any race were 1.4% of the population.

There were 347 households, of which 21.6% had children under the age of 18 living with them, 41.8% were married couples living together, 8.6% had a female householder with no husband present, 2.0% had a male householder with no wife present, and 47.6% were non-families. 34.6% of all households were made up of individuals, and 9.8% had someone living alone who was 65 years of age or older. The average household size was 2.13 and the average family size was 2.76.

The median age in the town was 23.1 years. 11.5% of residents were under the age of 18; 43.7% were between the ages of 18 and 24; 16% were from 25 to 44; 18.4% were from 45 to 64; and 10.3% were 65 years of age or older. The gender makeup of the town was 48.2% male and 51.8% female.

=== 2000 census ===
As of the census of 2000, there were 1,102 people, 359 households, and 199 families living in the town. The population density was 2,549.5 inhabitants per square mile (989.5/km^{2}). There were 414 housing units at an average density of 957.8 per square mile (371.7/km^{2}). The racial makeup of the town was 92.29% White, 4.81% African American, 0.18% Native American, 1.54% Asian, 0.09% Pacific Islander, and 1.09% from two or more races. Hispanic or Latino of any race were 0.91% of the population.

There were 359 households, out of which 20.3% had children under the age of 18 living with them, 43.7% were married couples living together, 10.0% had a female householder with no husband present, and 44.3% were non-families. 32.9% of all households were made up of individuals, and 14.8% had someone living alone who was 65 years of age or older. The average household size was 2.14 and the average family size was 2.74.

In the town, the population was spread out, with 12.7% under the age of 18, 40.1% from 18 to 24, 17.4% from 25 to 44, 17.4% from 45 to 64, and 12.3% who were 65 years of age or older. The median age was 24 years. For every 100 females, there were 147.6 males. For every 100 females age 18 and over, there were 156.5 males.

The median income for a household in the town was $27,260, and the median income for a family was $45,694. Males had a median income of $28,214 versus $20,268 for females. The per capita income for the town was $13,553. About 9.7% of families and 20.7% of the population were below the poverty line, including 17.1% of those under age 18 and 9.6% of those age 65 or over.

== Notable people ==
- Don Caruth, West Virginia politician
