= Martin Atkinson III =

American politician

Member of the West Virginia House of Delegates from the 11th district
- In office October 4, 2015 – December 1, 2020
- Preceded by: Bob Ashley

Personal details
- Party: Republican
- Education: West Virginia University

Martin "Rick" Atkinson III is an American politician. He was a Republican member of the West Virginia House of Delegates from the 11th district.
