= Eustace Frederick =

American politician

Member of the West Virginia House of Delegates from the 24th district
- In office October 17, 1993 – November 6, 2008
- Preceded by: Bill Carper
- Succeeded by: John Shott

Personal details
- Born: August 29, 1930 Switchback, West Virginia
- Died: November 6, 2008 (aged 78) Bluefield, West Virginia
- Party: Democratic

Eustace Frederick (August 29, 1930 – November 6, 2008) was an American politician who served in the West Virginia House of Delegates from the 24th district from 1993 until his death in 2008.

He died on November 6, 2008, in Bluefield, West Virginia at age 78.
