= Phil Diserio =

American politician (born 1959)

Member of the West Virginia House of Delegates from the 2nd district
- In office December 1, 2016 – December 1, 2022
- Preceded by: Ryan Weld
- Succeeded by: New boundaries
- In office January 23, 2012 – December 1, 2014
- Preceded by: Tim Ennis
- Succeeded by: Ryan Weld

Personal details
- Born: Phillip W Diserio; December 13, 1959 (age 66) Wheeling, West Virginia, U.S.
- Party: Democratic
- Spouse: Sandra
- Children: Cassie; Carrissa; Carlie
- Profession: Electrician

Phillip W Diserio (born December 13, 1959) is an American politician and a former Democratic member of the West Virginia House of Delegates who represented District 2 from his January 23, 2012 appointment by West Virginia Governor Earl Ray Tomblin to fill the vacancy caused by the resignation of Representative Tim Ennis. Diserio was defeated in his 2014 bid for reelection, but was later elected in 2016. In 2022, Diserio was defeated again by Jimmy Willis.

== Elections ==
- 2012 Diserio was unopposed for the May 8, 2012 Democratic Primary, winning with 3,022 votes, and won the November 6, 2012 General election with 3,440 votes (52.0%) against Republican nominee Lynn Davis.
