= Don Caruth =

American politician

Member of the West Virginia Senate from the 10th district
- In office 2004–2010

Personal details
- Born: Donald T. Caruth; May 23, 1950 Princeton, West Virginia
- Died: May 1, 2010 (aged 59) Athens, West Virginia
- Party: Republican
- Spouse: Laura
- Education: Concord College, B.A. West Virginia University College of Law, J.D.
- Occupation: Attorney

Donald T. Caruth (May 23, 1950 – May 1, 2010) was the minority leader of the West Virginia Senate and a former member of the West Virginia House of Delegates. He represented the 10th district, serving with Jesse O. Guills. His residence was in Athens, West Virginia, a town in Mercer County, where he died from brain cancer 22 days from his 60th birthday.
