= John Pino =

American politician (born 1931)

Member of the West Virginia House of Delegates from the 32nd district
- In office January 2013 – January 2017

Member of the West Virginia House of Delegates from the 29th district
- In office January 2011 – January 2013
- Preceded by: Tom Louisos

Member of the West Virginia House of Delegates from the 29th district
- In office January 1993 – January 2009
- Succeeded by: Tom Louisos

Member of the West Virginia House of Delegates from the 29th district
- In office January 1985 – January 1989

Personal details
- Born: July 12, 1931 (age 95) Mount Hope, West Virginia, U.S.
- Party: Democratic

John Pino (born July 12, 1931) is an American politician who was a Democratic member of the West Virginia House of Delegates representing District 32 from January 12, 2013 to January 2017. Pino served consecutively from January 2011 until January 2013, and non-consecutively from January 1985 until January 1989 and again from January 1993 until January 2009 in the District 29 seat.

== Elections ==
- 2012 Redistricted to District 32 alongside Democratic incumbent Representatives Margaret Anne Staggers and David Perry, Pino ran in the seven-way May 8, 2012 Democratic Primary and placed third with 3,507 votes (20.3%) ahead of former Representative Tom Louisos, and placed third in the four-way three-position November 6, 2012 General election with 10,035 votes (29.7%), behind Representatives Staggers and Perry, and ahead of Mountain Party candidate Tighe Bullock.
- 1980s Initially in District 29, Pino was elected in the November 6, 1984 General election and re-elected in the November 4, 1986 General election.
- 1992 Pino returned to the seat after winning the November 3, 1992 General election and was re-elected in the general elections of November 8, 1994 and November 5, 1996.
- 1998 Pino placed in the four-way 1998 Democratic Primary and was unopposed for the November 3, 1998 General election.
- 2000 Pino placed in the ten-way 2000 Democratic Primary and was re-elected in the four-way three-position November 7, 2000 General election ahead of Republican nominee Tom Fast.
- 2002 Pino ran in the five-way 2002 Democratic Primary and was re-elected in the five-way three-position November 5, 2002 General election ahead of Republican nominees Tom Fast and Kieth Spangler.
- 2004 Pino placed in the seven-way 2004 Democratic Primary and was re-elected in the six-way three-position November 2, 2004 General election ahead of Republican nominees Betty Lilly, Wandaleen Schallen, and Richard Taylor.
- 2006 Pino placed in the seven-way 2006 Democratic Primary and was re-elected in the four-way three-position November 7, 2006 General election ahead of returning 2004 Republican challenger Betty Lilly.
- 2008 Pino ran in the five-way May 13, 2008 Democratic Primary, but placed behind incumbent Representatives Margaret Anne Staggers and David Perry David Perry and former Representative Tom Louisos, who went on to win the six-way four-position November 4, 2008 General election.
- 2010 Pino ran in the five-way May 11, 2010 Democratic Primary and placed third by 46 votes with 2,337 votes (20.9%) ahead of Representative Louisos, and placed third in the four-way three-position November 2, 2010 General election with 6,857 votes (26.3%) ahead of Republican nominee Marshall Clay.
