= Jack Yost =

American politician

Member of the West Virginia Senate from the 1st district
- In office January 14, 2009 – January 11, 2017
- Preceded by: Andy McKenzie
- Succeeded by: Ryan Weld

Member of the West Virginia House of Delegates from the 2nd district
- In office January 8, 2003 – January 14, 2009

Personal details
- Born: Harold Jackson Yost Jr. October 12, 1945 (age 81) Weirton, West Virginia, U.S.
- Party: Democratic
- Spouse: Kris Littell
- Education: West Liberty State College

Harold Jackson Yost Jr. (born October 12, 1945) is a former Democratic member of the West Virginia Senate, representing the 1st district between 2008 and 2016.

== Electoral history ==
West Virginia's 1st senatorial district election, 2012
| Party | Candidate | Votes | % |
|---|---|---|---|
| Democratic | Jack Yost | 22,661 | 57.4 |
| Republican | Pat McGeehan | 16,850 | 42.6 |

West Virginia's 1st senatorial district election, 2008
| Party | Candidate | Votes | % |
|---|---|---|---|
| Democratic | Jack Yost | 23,938 | 60.3 |
| Republican | Chris Wakim | 15,782 | 39.7 |

West Virginia's 2nd delegate district election, 2006
| Party | Candidate | Votes | % |
|---|---|---|---|
| Democratic | Jack Yost | 5,438 | 33.8 |
| Democratic | Tim Ennis | 5,371 | 33.4 |
| Republican | Jo Lynn Kraina | 2,787 | 17.3 |
| Republican | Eric C. Jack | 2,482 | 15.4 |

West Virginia's 2nd delegate district election, 2004
| Party | Candidate | Votes | % |
|---|---|---|---|
| Democratic | Tim Ennis | 8,994 | 34.3 |
| Democratic | Jack Yost | 8,931 | 34.1 |
| Republican | James Gray | 4,229 | 16.1 |
| Republican | Robert "Les" McNinch | 4,054 | 15.5 |

West Virginia's 2nd delegate district election, 2002
| Party | Candidate | Votes | % |
|---|---|---|---|
| Democratic | Tim Ennis | 5,044 | 50.4 |
| Democratic | Jack Yost | 4,955 | 49.6 |
