= William Laird IV =

American politician

Member of the West Virginia Senate from the 10th district
- In office January 9, 2013 – January 11, 2017
- Preceded by: John Shott
- Succeeded by: Kenny Mann

Member of the West Virginia Senate from the 11th district
- In office January 14, 2009 – January 9, 2013
- Preceded by: Shirley Love
- Succeeded by: Clark Barnes

Member of the West Virginia House of Delegates from the 29th district
- In office January 8, 1997 – January 10, 2001
- Succeeded by: David Perry

Personal details
- Born: June 3, 1952 (age 74) Montgomery, West Virginia, U.S.
- Party: Democratic
- Parent: William Laird III
- Education: American University; Concord College; Marshall University

William Ramsey Laird IV (born June 3, 1952) is an American politician and a former Democratic member of the West Virginia Senate who represented District 10 from 2013 until 2017. Laird served consecutively from January 2009 until January 2013 in the District 11 seat, and served non-consecutively in the West Virginia Legislature from January 1997 until January 2001 in the West Virginia House of Delegates in a District 29 seat. Laird is the son of former United States Senator William Laird III.

== Education ==
Laird attended American University and earned his BA from Concord College (now Concord University) and his MA from Marshall University.

== Career ==
From 1989 to 1996 and 2001 to 2008, Laird was the sheriff of Fayette County, West Virginia. Laird was a member of the West Virginia House of Delegates from 1997 to 2001 and West Virginia State Senate from 2009 to 2017. In June 2016, Laird was elected vice chair of the West Virginia Democratic Party for a four-year term.

== Elections ==
- 2012 Redistricted to District 10, Laird was unopposed for both the May 8, 2012 Democratic Primary, winning with 11,264 votes, and the November 6, 2012 General election, winning with 26,819 votes.
- 1996 Laird was initially elected to a District 29 seat in the 1996 Democratic Primary and November 5, 1996 General election along with Tom Louisos (D) and John Pino (D).
- 1998 Laird and the incumbents were challenged in the four-way 1998 Democratic Primary, but all place, and were unopposed for the November 3, 1998 General election when they were all re-elected.
- 2008 When District 11 Democratic Senator Shirley Love left the Legislature and left a district seat open, Laird won the three-way May 13, 2008 Democratic Primary with 9,691 votes (44.1%), and won the three-way November 4, 2008 General election with 21,619 votes (59.6%) against Republican nominee Aubry Wilson and Mountain Party candidate James Waddell, who was elected to the West Virginia House of Delegates in 2010.
