= Bob Williams (West Virginia politician) =

American politician

Member of the West Virginia Senate from the 14th district
- In office January 14, 2009 – January 11, 2017
- Preceded by: Jon Blair Hunter
- Succeeded by: Randy Smith

Personal details
- Born: September 10, 1951 (age 75) Clarksburg, West Virginia U.S.
- Party: Democratic
- Education: Fairmont State College; West Virginia University

Robert Lynn Williams (born September 10, 1951) is an American politician and former Democratic member of the West Virginia Senate who represented District 14 from January 2009 until his defeat by Randy Smith in 2016.

== Education ==
Williams earned his BS from Fairmont State College (now Fairmont State University) and his MS from West Virginia University.

== Elections ==
- 2012 Williams was unopposed for the May 8, 2012 Democratic Primary, winning with 9,508 votes, and was unopposed for the November 6, 2012 General election, winning with 27,690 votes.
- 2008 When District 14 Democratic Senator Jon Blair Hunter left the Legislature and left a district seat open, Williams won the May 13, 2008 Democratic Primary with 9,655 votes (55.7%), and won the November 4, 2008 General election with 22,205 votes (51.3%) against Republican nominee Gary Howell, who was elected to the West Virginia House of Delegates in 2010.
