= Randy Smith (politician) =

American politician

President of the West Virginia Senate Lieutenant Governor of West Virginia
- Incumbent
- Assumed office January 8, 2025
- Governor: Jim Justice; Patrick Morrisey
- Preceded by: Craig Blair

Member of the West Virginia Senate from the 14th district
- Incumbent
- Assumed office January 11, 2017 Serving with Jay Taylor
- Preceded by: Bob Williams

Member of the West Virginia House of Delegates from the 53rd district
- In office January 12, 2013 – January 11, 2017
- Preceded by: Jonathan Miller
- Succeeded by: Tony J. Lewis

Personal details
- Born: Randy Edward Smith; March 3, 1960 (age 66) Oakland, Maryland, U.S.
- Party: Republican
- Spouse: Patty Smith
- Children: 2
- Website: Campaign website

Randy Edward Smith (born March 3, 1960) is an American politician, the president of the West Virginia Senate, and the lieutenant governor of West Virginia since January 8, 2025. He is a Republican member of the West Virginia Senate representing District 14 since January 11, 2017.

== Elections ==
West Virginia Senate District 14 (Position B) election, 2016
Party	Candidate	Votes	%
Republican	Randy Smith	23,201	53.26%
Democratic	Bob Williams	18,264	41.93%
Libertarian	Matthew Persinger	2,098	4.82%
Total votes		43,563	100.0%

- 2012 Smith was unopposed for the May 8, 2012 Republican Primary, winning with 1,485 votes, and won the November 6, 2012 General election, winning with 4,059 votes (57.6%) against Democratic incumbent Stan Shaver.

Political offices
Preceded by Craig Blair	President of the West Virginia Senate; 2025–present	Incumbent
