= Jay Taylor (West Virginia politician) =

American politician

President pro tempore of the West Virginia Senate
- Incumbent
- Assumed office January 14, 2026
- Preceded by: Donna Boley

Member of the West Virginia Senate from the 14th district
- Incumbent
- Assumed office December 1, 2022 Serving with Randy Smith
- Preceded by: David Sypolt

Personal details
- Born: John Taylor; January 29, 1973 (age 53)
- Party: Republican
- Education: West Virginia University (BS, MBA)

Jay Hill Taylor (born January 29, 1973) is an American politician who has served as a member of the West Virginia Senate from the 14th district since the 2022 West Virginia Senate election.

Taylor has experience in grassroots advocacy.

Taylor was selected as president pro tempore of the West Virginia Senate in 2026, following the resignation of senator Donna Boley.

West Virginia Senate
Preceded by Donna Boley	President pro tempore of the West Virginia Senate; 2026–present	Incumbent
