= Ronald F. Miller =

American politician

Ronald Miller

Member of the West Virginia Senate from the 10th district
- In office January 12, 2011 – September 28, 2017
- Preceded by: Jesse Guills
- Succeeded by: Stephen Baldwin

Personal details
- Born: November 12, 1954 (age 71) Geneva, New York
- Party: Democratic
- Education: Shepherd University; Southern Baptist Theological Seminary

Ronald 'Ron' F. Miller (born November 12, 1954, in Geneva, New York) is an American politician and former Democratic member of the West Virginia Senate representing District 10 from 2011 to 2017. In September 2017, Miller resigned from the Senate to become agriculture liaison in the administration of Governor Jim Justice.

== Education ==
Miller earned his BA in social studies from Shepherd College (now Shepherd University) and his MA in education from the Southern Baptist Theological Seminary.

== Elections ==
- 2010 When District 10 Republican Senator Jesse Guills retired and left the seat open, Miller was unopposed for the May 11, 2010 Democratic Primary, winning with 8,391 votes, and won the November 2, 2010 General election with 14,093 votes (51.9%) against Republican nominee Johnny Barnes.
