= Donna Boley =

American politician (born 1935)

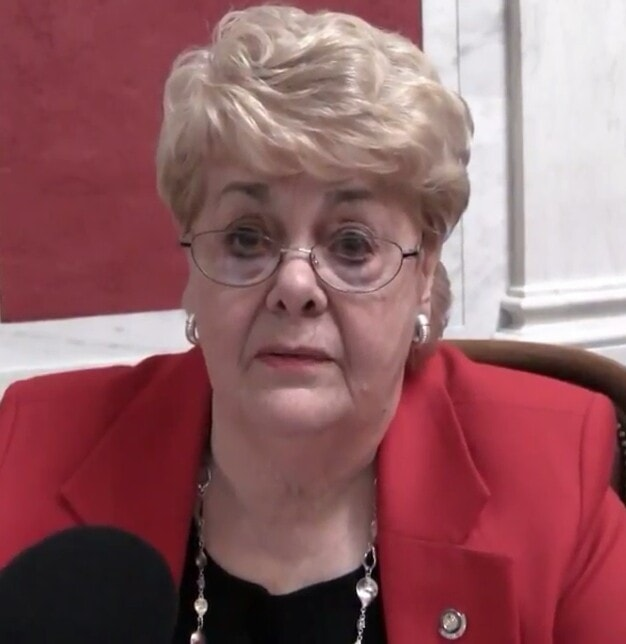

President pro tempore of the West Virginia Senate
- In office January 14, 2015 – January 8, 2026
- Preceded by: Joseph M. Minard
- Succeeded by: Jay Taylor

Minority Leader of the West Virginia Senate
- In office January 9, 1991 – January 8, 1997
- Preceded by: Charlton Harmon
- Succeeded by: Jack Buckalew

Member of the West Virginia Senate from the 3rd district
- In office May 14, 1985 – January 8, 2026
- Preceded by: Sam White
- Succeeded by: Trenton Barnhart

Personal details
- Born: Donna Jean Northcraft; December 9, 1935 (age 90) Bens Run, West Virginia, U.S.
- Party: Republican
- Spouse: Jack Boley
- Children: 2
- Education: West Virginia University, Parkersburg (BA)

Donna Jean Boley (née Northcraft; born December 9, 1935) is a former Republican member of the West Virginia Senate who represented the 3rd district. She was appointed by West Virginia Governor Arch A. Moore, Jr. on May 14, 1985, to fill the seat vacated by Sam White’s resignation on April 24, 1985. Boley won the election to complete White's unexpired term in 1986, and was re-elected ten times. From 1990 to 1996, she was Senate Minority Leader. In 1991 and 1992, she was the sole Republican in the 34-member Senate, making her the minority chairwoman for all Senate committee.

Boley resigned from the West Virginia Senate in January 2026. At the time of her resignation Boley was the longest-serving state senator in West Virginia history. She represented Senate District 3, which includes Pleasants, Wood, Wirt and part of Roane counties.

== Electoral history ==
2020 West Virginia Senate election, District 3 General election
Party	Candidate	Votes	%
Republican	Donna J. Boley (incumbent)	29,889	66.27%
Democratic	Robert Wilson	11,812	26.19%
Libertarian	Travis Shultz	3,403	7.54%

2016 West Virginia Senate election, District 3 General election
Party	Candidate	Votes	%
Republican	Donna J. Boley (incumbent)	27,172	64.70%
Democratic	Louis F. Flade	14,826	35.30%

2016 West Virginia Senate election, District 3 Republican Primary
Primary election
Party	Candidate	Votes	%
Republican	Donna Boley (incumbent)	11,508	62.97%
Republican	Bob Ashley	3,398	18.59%
Republican	John Riggs	3,368	18.43%
Total votes		18,274	100.0%

2012 West Virginia Senate election, District 3 General election
Party	Candidate	Votes	%
Republican	Donna J. Boley (incumbent)	33,458	100.00%

2008 West Virginia Senate election, District 3 General election
Party	Candidate	Votes	%
Republican	Donna J. Boley (incumbent)	35,470	100.00%

2004 West Virginia Senate election, District 3 General election
Party	Candidate	Votes	%
Republican	Donna J. Boley (incumbent)	37,778	100.00%

2000 West Virginia Senate election, District 3 General election
Party	Candidate	Votes	%
Republican	Donna J. Boley (incumbent)	28,396	70.67%
Democratic	Louis F. Flade	11,786	29.33%

1996 West Virginia Senate election, District 3 General election
Party	Candidate	Votes	%
Republican	Donna J. Boley (incumbent)	26,632	70.62%
Democratic	Louis F. Flade	11,079	29.38%

1992 West Virginia Senate election, District 3 General election
Party	Candidate	Votes	%
Republican	Donna J. Boley (incumbent)	25,507	61.43%
Democratic	Ronald Blankenship	16,017	38.57%

1988 West Virginia Senate election, District 3 General election
Party	Candidate	Votes	%
Republican	Donna J. Boley (incumbent)	21,695	59.37%
Democratic	Bruce Martin	14,847	40.62%

1986 West Virginia Senate election, District 3 General election
Party	Candidate	Votes	%
Republican	Donna J. Boley	13,772	55.03%
Democratic	Gregory K. Smith	11,251	44.96%

West Virginia Senate
Preceded by Charlton Harmon	Minority Leader of the West Virginia Senate; 1991–1997	Succeeded by Jack Buckalew
Preceded by Joseph M. Minard	President pro tempore of the West Virginia Senate; 2015–2026	Succeeded by Jay Taylor
