= West Virginia's 14th Senate district =

American legislative district

West Virginia's 14th State Senate district
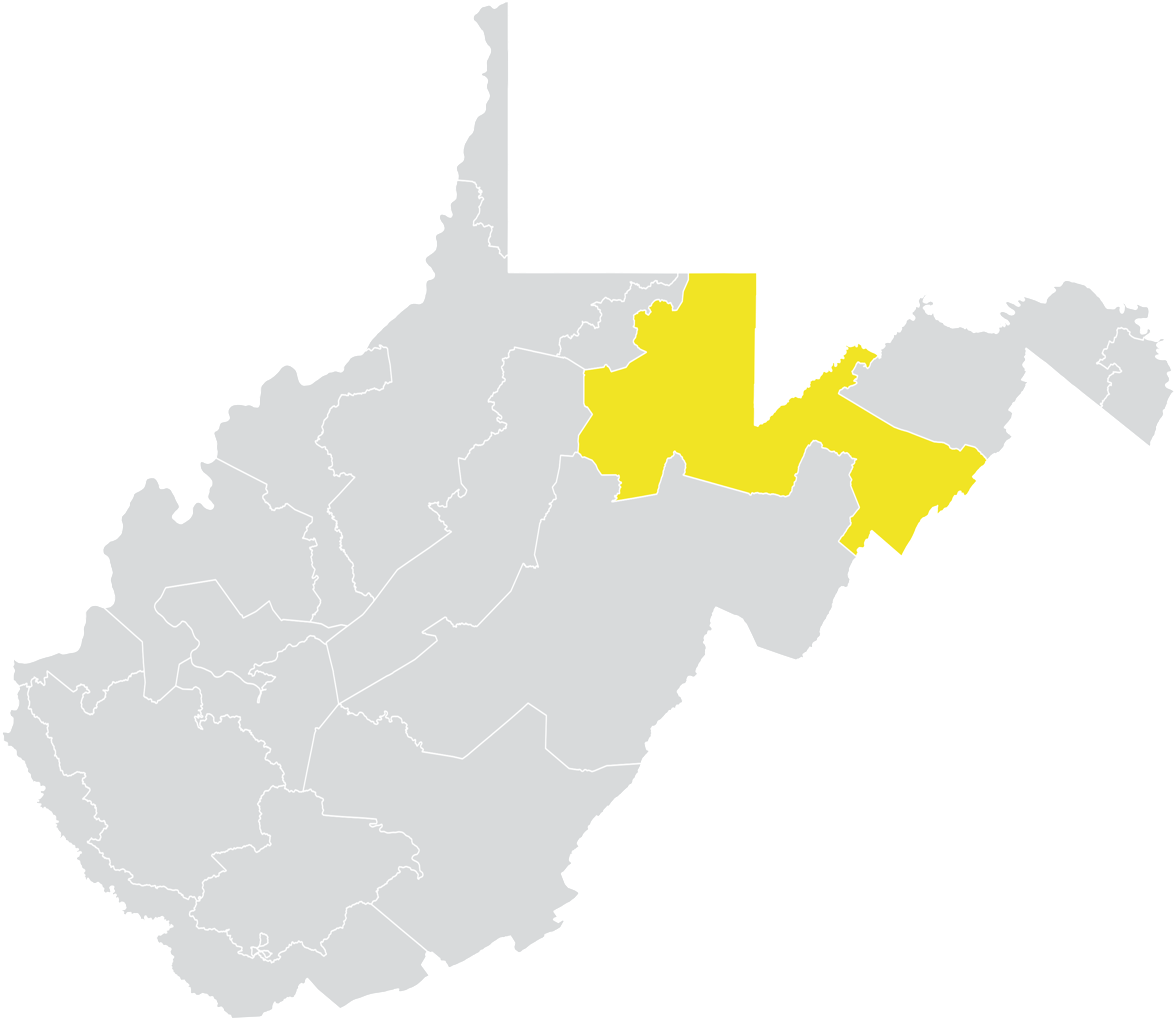
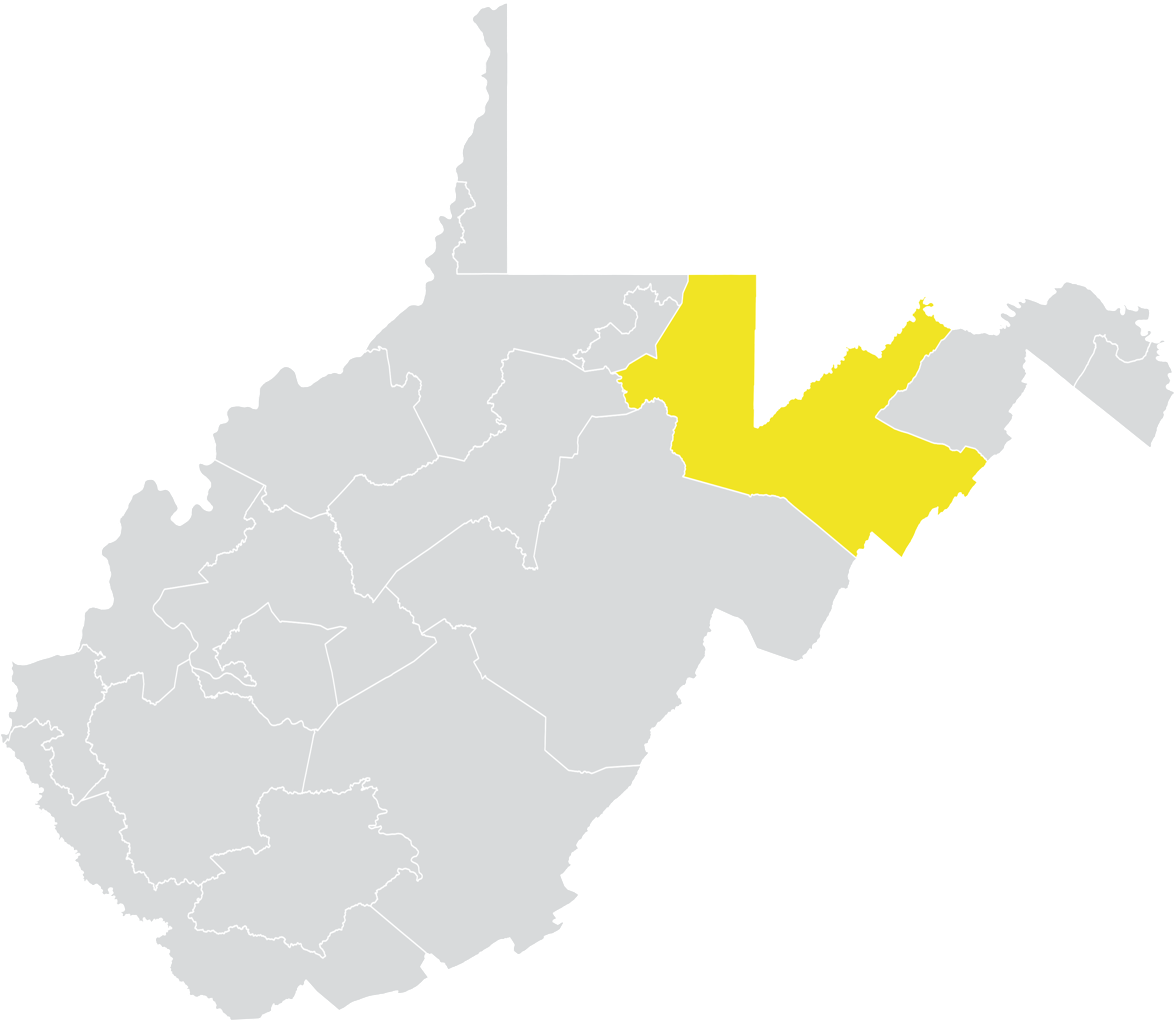
Senator
Jay Taylor; R–Grafton
Randy Smith; R–Thomas
- Demographics: 93% White; 3% Black; 2% Hispanic; 1% Asian; 1% Other
- Population (2017): 114,911

West Virginia's 14th Senate district is one of 17 districts in the West Virginia Senate. It is currently represented by Republicans Randy Smith and Jay Taylor. All districts in the West Virginia Senate elect two members to staggered four-year terms.

== Geography ==
District 14 is located at the base of the state's Eastern Panhandle, covering all of Barbour, Hardy, Preston, Taylor, and Tucker Counties, as well as parts of Grant, Mineral, and Monongalia Counties. Communities within the district include Philippi, Belington, Grafton, Brookhaven, Kingwood, Terra Alta, Parsons, Keyser, and Moorefield.

The district is largely within West Virginia's 1st congressional district, with a small portion extending into the 2nd district. It overlaps with the 47th, 48th, 49th, 51st, 52nd, 53rd, 54th, 55th, and 56th districts of the West Virginia House of Delegates. It borders the states of Pennsylvania, Maryland, and Virginia.

== Recent election results ==
=== 2024 ===
2024 West Virginia Senate election, District 14
Primary election
Party	Candidate	Votes	%
Republican	Randy Smith (incumbent)	13,897	100.0
Total votes		13,897	100.0
Mountain	Betsy Orndoff-Sayers	19	100.0
Total votes		19	100.0
General election
Republican	Randy Smith (incumbent)	36,296	86.65
Mountain	Betsy Orndoff-Sayers	5,594	13.35
Total votes		41,890	100
Republican hold			

=== 2022 ===
2022 West Virginia Senate election, District 14
Primary election
Party	Candidate	Votes	%
Republican	Jay Taylor	4,292	35.6
Republican	JR Keplinger	2,217	18.4
Republican	Angela Iman	2,206	18.3
Republican	James Lough	1,821	15.1
Republican	Stephen Smith	1,514	12.6
Total votes		12,050	100
General election
Republican	Jay Taylor	21,910	76.2
Democratic	Amanda Pitzer	6,855	23.8
Total votes		28,765	100

== Historical election results ==
=== 2020 ===
2020 West Virginia Senate election, District 14
Party	Candidate	Votes	%
Republican	Randy Smith (incumbent)	35,382	72.6
Democratic	David Childers	13,361	27.4
Total votes		48,743	100
Republican hold			

=== 2018 ===
2018 West Virginia Senate election, District 14
Party	Candidate	Votes	%
Republican	David Sypolt (incumbent)	21,936	60.2
Democratic	Stephanie Zucker	14,492	39.8
Total votes		36,428	100
Republican hold			

=== 2016 ===
2016 West Virginia Senate election, District 14
Party	Candidate	Votes	%
Republican	Randy Smith	23,201	53.3
Democratic	Bob Williams (incumbent)	18,264	41.9
Libertarian	Matthew Persinger	2,098	4.8
Total votes		43,563	100
Republican gain from Democratic			

=== 2014 ===
2014 West Virginia Senate election, District 14
Party	Candidate	Votes	%
Republican	David Sypolt (incumbent)	15,953	65.4
Democratic	Stan Shaver	8,456	34.6
Total votes		24,409	100
Republican hold			

=== 2012 ===
2012 West Virginia Senate election, District 14
Party	Candidate	Votes	%
Democratic	Bob Williams (incumbent)	27,690	100
Total votes		27,690	100
Democratic hold			

=== Federal and statewide results ===
Year	Office	Results
2020	President	Trump 73.4 – 24.9%
2016	President	Trump 72.7 – 22.3%
2014	Senate	Capito 65.5 – 30.2%
2012	President	Romney 67.4 – 30.0%
2012	Senate	Manchin 50.1 – 47.1%
2012	Governor	Maloney 49.9 – 45.2%
