= West Virginia's 10th Senate district =

American legislative district

West Virginia's 10th State Senate district
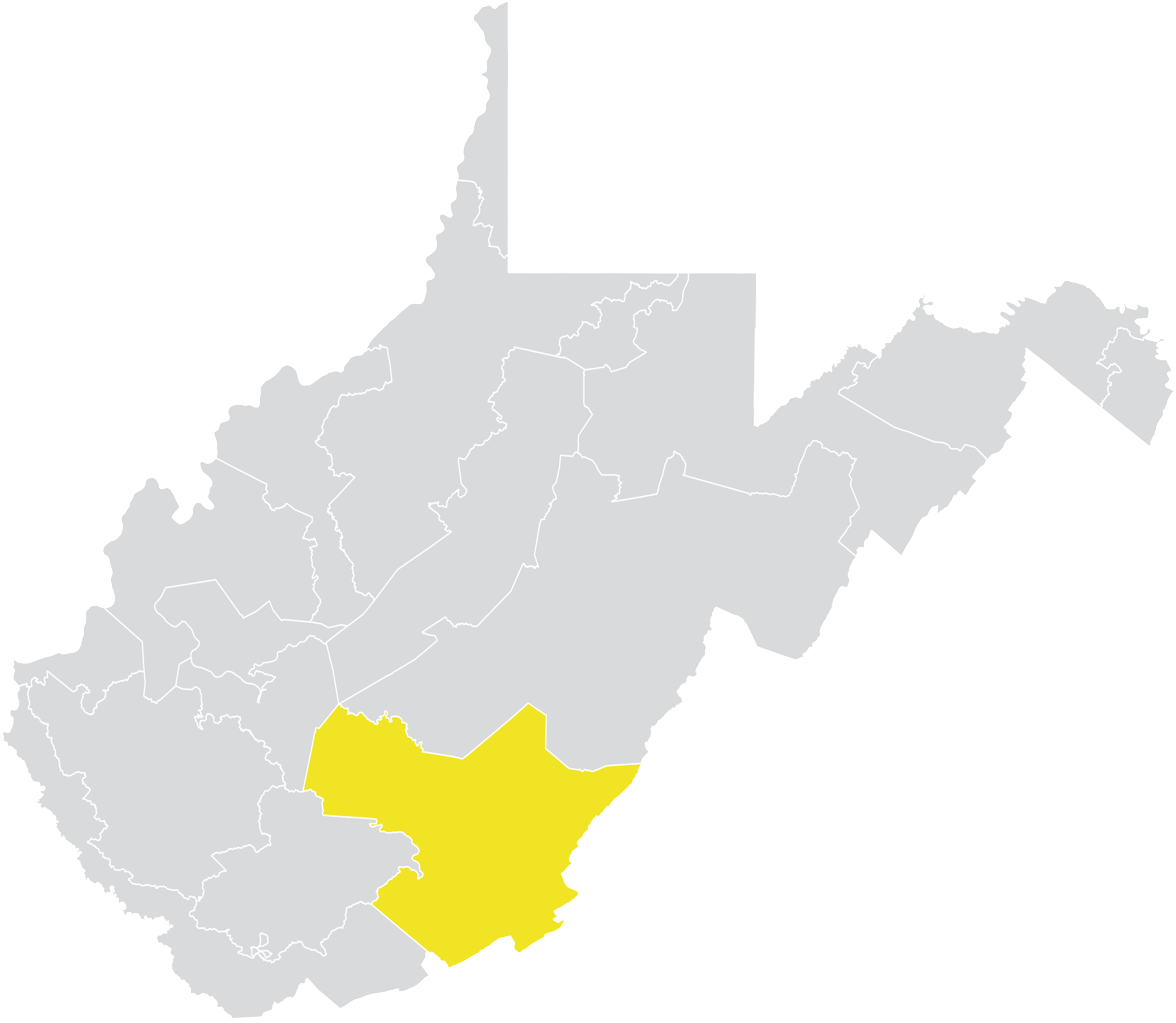
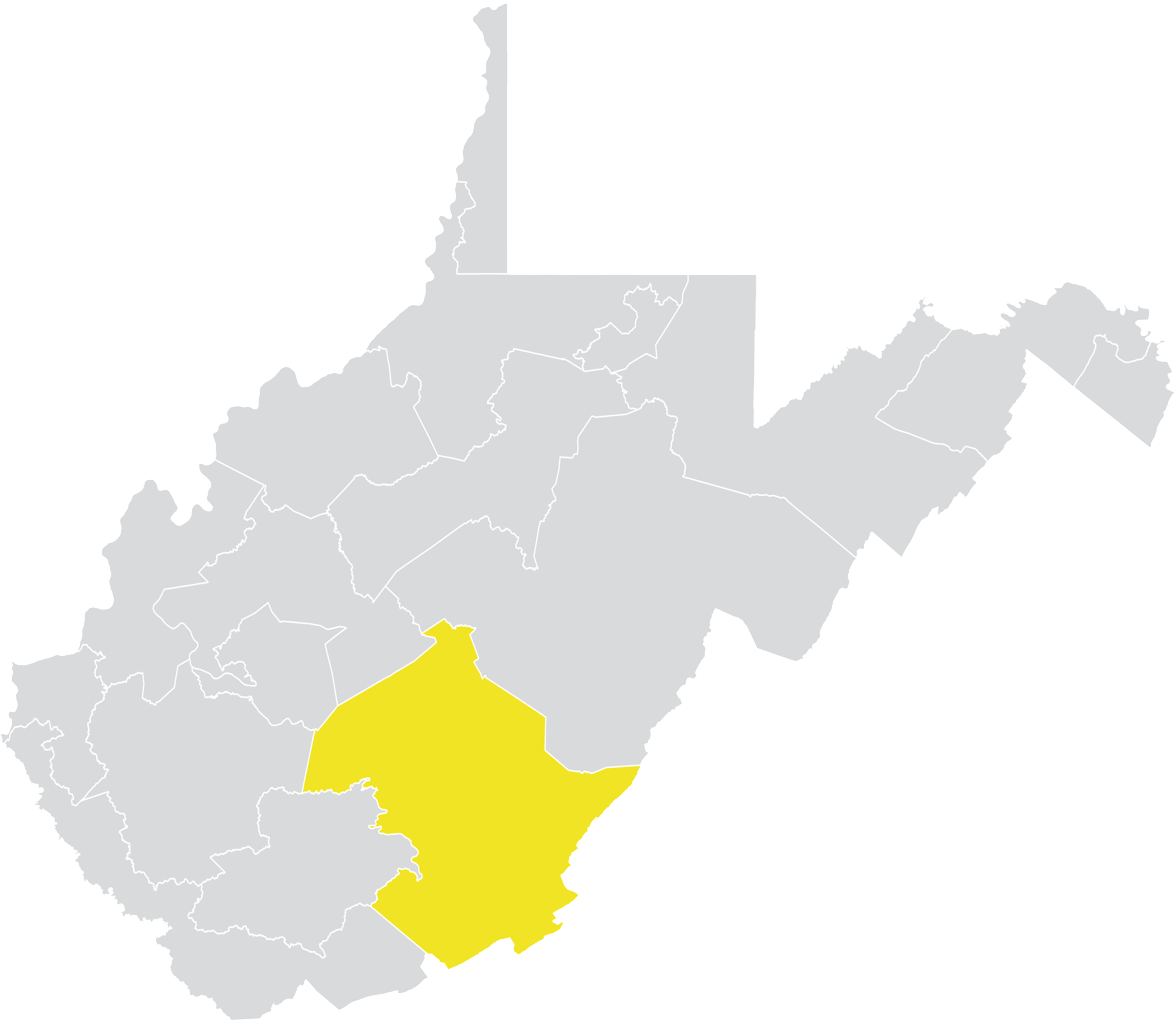
Senator
Vince Deeds; R–Renick
Jack Woodrum; R–Hinton
- Demographics: 93% White; 4% Black; 1% Hispanic; 0% Asian; 2% Other
- Population (2017): 106,852

West Virginia's 10th Senate district is one of 17 districts in the West Virginia Senate. It is currently represented by and Republicans Jack Woodrum and Vince Deeds. All districts in the West Virginia Senate elect two members to staggered four-year terms.

== Geography ==
District 10 covers all of Fayette, Greenbrier, Monroe, and Summers Counties in Southern West Virginia. Communities within the district include Alderson, Hinton, Lewisburg, Ronceverte, White Sulphur Springs, Rainelle, Fairlea, Montgomery, Mount Hope, Oak Hill, Ansted, and Fayetteville.

The district is located entirely within West Virginia's 3rd congressional district, and overlaps with the 28th, 32nd, 41st, and 42nd districts of the West Virginia House of Delegates. It borders the state of Virginia.

== Recent election results ==
=== 2024 ===
2024 West Virginia Senate election, District 10
Primary election
Party	Candidate	Votes	%
Republican	Jack Woodrum (incumbent)	12,413	100.0
Total votes		12,413	100.0
General election
Republican	Jack Woodrum (incumbent)	37,651	99.95
Write-in		20	0.05
Total votes		37,671	100
Republican hold			

=== 2022 ===
2022 West Virginia Senate election, District 10
Primary election
Party	Candidate	Votes	%
Republican	Vince Deeds	4,924	48.9
Republican	Mike Steadham	4,228	42.0
Republican	Thomas Perkins	920	9.1
Total votes		10,072	100
General election
Republican	Vince Deeds	18,954	58.7
Democratic	Stephen Baldwin (incumbent)	12,250	37.9
Independent	Aaron Ransom	1,085	3.4
Total votes		32,259	100
Republican gain from Democratic			

== Historical election results ==
=== 2020 ===
2020 West Virginia Senate election, District 10
Primary election
Party	Candidate	Votes	%
Republican	Jack Woodrum	6,832	62.3
Republican	Dan Hill	4,127	37.7
Total votes		10,959	100
General election
Republican	Jack Woodrum	25,315	58.6
Democratic	William Laird IV	17,895	41.4
Total votes		43,210	100
Republican hold			

=== 2018 ===
Democrat Stephen Baldwin was appointed in 2017 to serve the remaining term of Ronald F. Miller, who had resigned to take a position in the administration of Governor Jim Justice.

2018 West Virginia Senate election, District 10
Primary election
Party	Candidate	Votes	%
Republican	George Ambler	4,169	56.5
Republican	Dan Hill	3,216	43.5
Total votes		7,385	100
General election
Democratic	Stephen Baldwin (incumbent)	17,495	53.2
Republican	George Ambler	15,421	46.8
Total votes		32,916	100
Democratic hold			

=== 2016 ===
2016 West Virginia Senate election, District 10
Primary election
Party	Candidate	Votes	%
Republican	Kenny Mann	4,343	47.1
Republican	Tom Ewing	3,444	37.3
Republican	Dan Hill	1,443	15.6
Total votes		9,230	100
General election
Republican	Kenny Mann	21,148	54.7
Democratic	Dave Perry	17,494	45.3
Total votes		38,642	100
Republican gain from Democratic			

=== 2014 ===
2014 West Virginia Senate election, District 10
Party	Candidate	Votes	%
Democratic	Ronald F. Miller (incumbent)	13,776	53.8
Republican	Duane Zobrist	11,815	46.2
Total votes		25,591	100
Democratic hold			

=== 2012 ===
2012 West Virginia Senate election, District 10
Party	Candidate	Votes	%
Democratic	William Laird IV (incumbent)	26,819	100
Total votes		26,819	100
Democratic hold			

=== Federal and statewide results ===
Year	Office	Results
2020	President	Trump 70.6 – 27.9%
2016	President	Trump 69.4 – 25.8%
2014	Senate	Capito 56.6 – 39.5%
2012	President	Romney 61.9 – 35.7%
2012	Senate	Manchin 62.7 – 33.2%
2012	Governor	Tomblin 50.6 – 44.5%
