= West Virginia's 3rd Senate district =

American legislative district

West Virginia's 3rd State Senate district
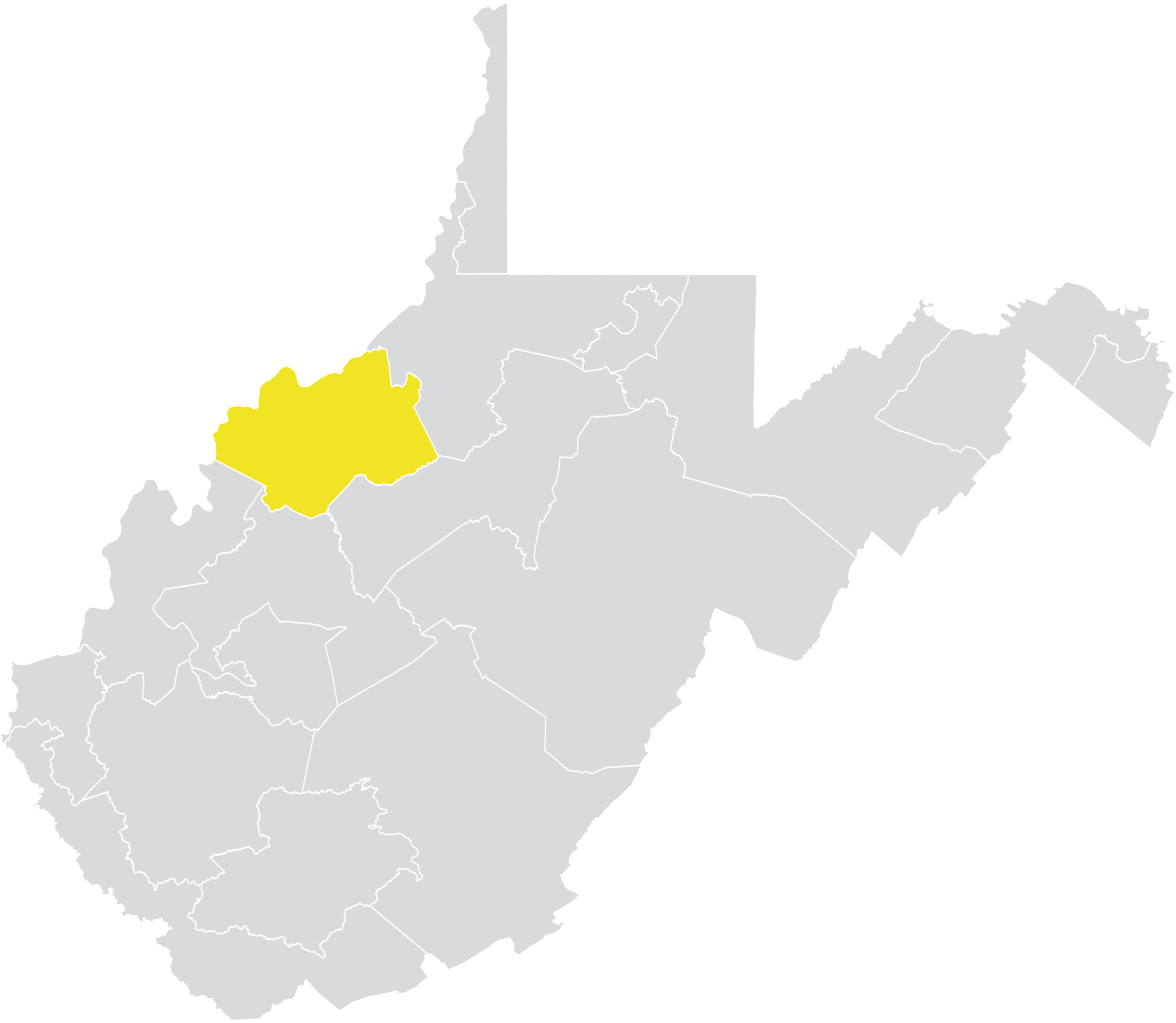
Senator
Mike Azinger; R–Vienna
Donna Boley; R–St. Marys
- Demographics: 94% White; 2% Black; 1% Hispanic; 1% Asian; 2% Native American
- Population (2021): 105,587

West Virginia's 3rd Senate district is one of 17 districts in the West Virginia Senate. It is currently represented by Republicans Donna Boley and Mike Azinger. All districts in the West Virginia Senate elect two members to staggered four-year terms.

== Geography ==
District 3 covers much of the Mid-Ohio Valley region, including all of Pleasants, Wirt, and Wood Counties and parts of Roane County. It is based in the city of Parkersburg, also covering the nearby communities of Vienna, Williamstown, Blennerhassett, Mineralwells, Elizabeth, and St. Marys.

The district is located largely within West Virginia's 1st congressional district, with a small portion extending into West Virginia's 2nd congressional district, and overlaps with the 6th, 7th, 8th, 9th, 10th, and 11th districts of the West Virginia House of Delegates. It borders the state of Ohio.

== Recent election results ==
=== 2024 ===
2024 West Virginia Senate election, District 3
Primary election
Party	Candidate	Votes	%
Republican	Donna Boley (incumbent)	12,325	100.0
Total votes		12,477	100.0
General election
Republican	Donna Boley (incumbent)	37,987	100.0
Total votes		37,987	100.0
Republican hold			

=== 2022 ===
2022 West Virginia Senate election, District 3
Primary election
Party	Candidate	Votes	%
Republican	Mike Azinger (incumbent)	6,600	51.5
Republican	John Kelly	6,210	48.5
Total votes		12,810	100
General election
Republican	Mike Azinger (incumbent)	20,812	65.7
Democratic	Jody Murphy	10,861	34.3
Total votes		31,673	100.0

== Historical election results ==
=== 2020 ===
2020 West Virginia Senate election, District 3
Party	Candidate	Votes	%
Republican	Donna Boley (incumbent)	29,889	66.3
Democratic	Robert Wilson Jr.	11,812	26.2
Libertarian	Travis Shultz	3,403	7.5
Total votes		45,104	100
Republican hold			

=== 2018 ===
2018 West Virginia Senate election, District 3
Primary election
Party	Candidate	Votes	%
Democratic	Jim Leach	3,695	55.1
Democratic	Simon Hargus	3,009	44.9
Total votes		6,704	100
General election
Republican	Mike Azinger (incumbent)	19,964	57.4
Democratic	Jim Leach	14,818	42.6
Total votes		34,782	100
Republican hold			

=== 2016 ===
In 2016, both seats were up for election due to an unusual series of events. Republican Bob Ashley, who had been appointed to the Senate following the departure of David Nohe in 2015, chose to run in a primary against his fellow senator Donna Boley, leaving his own seat open and triggering a special election.

==== 2016 regular ====
2016 West Virginia Senate election, District 3
Primary election
Party	Candidate	Votes	%
Republican	Donna Boley (incumbent)	11,508	63.0
Republican	Bob Ashley (incumbent)	3,398	18.6
Republican	John Riggs	3,368	18.4
Total votes		18,274	100
General election
Republican	Donna Boley (incumbent)	27,172	64.7
Democratic	Bradley Vanzile	14,826	35.3
Total votes		41,998	100
Republican hold			

==== 2016 special ====
2016 West Virginia Senate special election, District 3
Primary election
Party	Candidate	Votes	%
Republican	Mike Azinger	9,065	60.7
Republican	Sam Winans	5,865	39.3
Total votes		14,930	100
General election
Republican	Mike Azinger	23,034	54.6
Democratic	Gregory K. Smith	19,125	45.4
Total votes		42,159	100
Republican hold			

=== 2014 ===
2014 West Virginia Senate election, District 3
Party	Candidate	Votes	%
Republican	David Nohe (incumbent)	19,321	76.3
Democratic	Robin Wilson, Jr.	6,014	23.7
Total votes		25,335	100
Republican hold			

=== 2012 ===
2012 West Virginia Senate election, District 3
Party	Candidate	Votes	%
Republican	Donna Boley (incumbent)	33,458	100
Total votes		33,458	100
Republican hold			

=== Federal and statewide results ===
Year	Office	Results
2020	President	Trump 72.6 – 25.8%
2020	Senate	Capito 74.5 – 22.8%
2020	Governor	Justice 71.4 – 24.7%
2018	Senate	Morrisey 49.0 – 47.0%
2016	President	Trump 73.1 – 21.9%
2016	Governor	Justice 47.2 – 46.0%
