= Seaborn Buckalew Jr. =

American lawyer, politician, and judge

Seaborn Jesse Buckalew Jr. (December 6, 1920 – May 11, 2017) was an American lawyer, politician, and judge.

== Biography ==
Born in Dallas, Texas, Buckalew served in the United States Army during World War II. He also served in the United States Air Force in 1951 and 1952. He received his bachelor's degree from Texas A&M University in 1942 and his law degree from Stetson University College of Law in 1949. He was admitted to the Florida bar. In 1950, Buckalew moved to Anchorage, Alaska Territory where he practiced law. He also served as prosecutor for the Alaska Territory. Buckalew served in the Alaska Constitutional Convention of 1955. From 1955 to 1959, Buckalew served in the Alaska Territorial House of Representatives. In 1959 and 1960, Buckalew served in the Alaska Senate. In 1971, he served as district attorney for Anchorage, Alaska. From 1973 to 1988, Buckalew served on the Alaska Superior Court. Buckalew died in Anchorage, Alaska.
