= Jack Buckalew =

American politician (1932–2016)

Jackie Ray "Jack" Buckalew

Minority Leader of the West Virginia Senate
- In office January 8, 1997 – December 1, 1998
- Preceded by: Donna Boley
- Succeeded by: Vic Sprouse

Member of the West Virginia Senate from the 8th district
- In office December 1, 1994 – December 1, 1998
- Preceded by: Jim Humphreys
- Succeeded by: John R. Mitchell, Jr.

Personal details
- Born: November 11, 1932 Charleston, West Virginia, U.S.
- Died: March 3, 2016 (aged 83) Boca Raton, Florida, U.S.
- Party: Republican
- Spouse: Eula (died 2004)
- Children: Robert; Paul
- Education: Marshall University

Jackie Ray "Jack" Buckalew (November 11, 1932 – March 3, 2016) was an American law enforcement officer and politician.

Buckalew was born in Charleston, West Virginia, and graduated from Ripley High School in 1950. He served in the United States Navy from 1951 to 1955 on the aircraft carrier USS Hornet (CV-12). He received a bachelor's degree in criminal justice from Morris Harvey College and master's degree in safety education from Marshall University. He served as superintendent of the West Virginia State Police and Charleston Police Chief. Buckalew served in the West Virginia State Senate and was a Republican. Buckalew lived in Ripley, West Virginia. He also served as secretary of the West Virginia Department of Administration. Buckalew died at his home in Boca Raton, Florida.

He was a Kentucky Colonel.
