= David Nohe =

American politician

Member of the West Virginia Senate from the 3rd district
- In office December 1, 2010 – August 30, 2015
- Preceded by: Frank Deem
- Succeeded by: Bob Ashley

Personal details
- Born: May 10, 1952 (age 74) Parkersburg, West Virginia, U.S.
- Party: Republican
- Education: West Virginia University at Parkersburg

David Clay Nohe (born May 10, 1952) is an American politician and a former Republican member of the West Virginia Senate representing District 3 between 2010 and 2015. Nohe was the mayor of Vienna, West Virginia from 1997 through 2012.

== Education ==
Nohe attended West Virginia University at Parkersburg.

== Elections ==
- 2010 Nohe challenged District 3 incumbent Senator Frank Deem and won the May 11, 2010 Republican Primary with 4,497 votes (52.4%), and won the November 2, 2010 General election with 21,295 votes (67.7%) against Democratic nominee Timothy Reed.
