= David Perry (politician) =

American politician

Member of the West Virginia House of Delegates from the 32nd district
- In office January 12, 2013 – 2016

Member of the West Virginia House of Delegates from the 29th district
- In office January 2001 – January 2013
- Preceded by: William Laird IV
- Succeeded by: Rick Moye

Personal details
- Born: July 31, 1952 (age 74) Oak Hill, West Virginia, U.S.
- Party: Democratic
- Education: Beckley Junior College; Marshall University

David G. Perry (born July 31, 1952) is an American politician who was a Democratic member of the West Virginia House of Delegates representing District 32 from January 12, 2013 to 2016. Perry served consecutively from January 2001 until January 2013 in a District 29 seat.

== Education ==
Perry earned his AS from Beckley Junior College and his BA and MA from Marshall University.

== Elections ==
- 2012 Redistricted to District 32 alongside Democratic incumbent Representatives Margaret Anne Staggers and John Pino, Perry placed second in the seven-way May 8, 2012 Democratic Primary with 3,653 votes (21.1%), and placed second in the four-way three-position November 6, 2012 General election with 10,128 votes (29.9%), behind Representatives Staggers (D) and ahead of Representative Pino (D) and Mountain Party candidate Tighe Bullock.
- 2000 When House District 29 Representative William Laird IV left the Legislature and left a district seat open, Perry placed in the ten-way 2000 Democratic Primary and was elected in the four-way three-position November 7, 2000 General election alongside incumbent Representatives Tom Louisos (D) and John Pino (D).
- 2002 Perry placed in the five-way 2002 Democratic Primary and was re-elected in the five-way three-position November 5, 2002 General election with incumbents Louisos (D) and Pino (D).
- 2004 Perry placed in the seven-way 2004 Democratic Primary and was re-elected in the six-way three-position November 2, 2004 General election with incumbents Louisos (D) and Pino (D).
- 2006 Perry placed in the seven-way 2006 Democratic Primary where Representative Louisos was displaced by nominee Margaret Anne Staggers; Perry and was re-elected in the four-way three-position November 7, 2006 General election with incumbent Pino (D) and fellow Democratic nominee Margaret Anne Staggers.
- 2008 Perry placed second in the five-way May 13, 2008 Democratic Primary with 5,860 votes (22.4%) where former Representative Louisos displaced Representative Pino; Perry placed second in the six-way four-position November 4, 2008 General election with 9,227 votes (22.9%) behind former Representative Louisos and ahead of incumbent Representative Staggers and Republican nominees Marshall Clay, Daniel Wright, and Steven Smith.
- 2010 Perry placed second in the five-way May 11, 2010 Democratic Primary with 2,619 votes (23.4%), and placed second in the four-way three-position November 2, 2010 General election with 7,169 votes (27.5%) behind incumbent Staggers (D) and ahead of returning Representative Pino and returning 2008 Republican opponent Marshall Clay.
