= Bob Ashley =

American politician (1953–2024)

Member of the West Virginia Senate from the 3rd district
- In office September 15, 2015 – January 11, 2017
- Preceded by: David Nohe
- Succeeded by: Mike Azinger

Minority Leader of the West Virginia House of Delegates
- In office January 11, 1995 – December 1, 1998
- Preceded by: Robert Burk
- Succeeded by: Charles S. Trump

Member of the West Virginia House of Delegates from the 11th district
- In office January 10, 2001 – September 15, 2015
- Preceded by: Oscar Hines
- Succeeded by: Martin Atkinson III

Member of the West Virginia House of Delegates from the 28th district
- In office January 9, 1985 – January 13, 1999
- Succeeded by: Oscar Hines

Personal details
- Born: July 4, 1953 Charleston, West Virginia, U.S.
- Died: May 14, 2024 (aged 70) Charleston, West Virginia, U.S.
- Party: Republican
- Spouse: Anita Harold
- Children: 2
- Education: Marshall University

Robert Gene Ashley (July 4, 1953 – May 14, 2024) was an American politician from West Virginia. As a member of the Republican Party, Ashley served in the West Virginia House of Delegates, representing the 28th district from January 1985 to January 1999 and the 11th district from 2001 to 2015, as well as in the West Virginia Senate for the 3rd district between 2015 and 2017.

== Personal life ==
Ashley earned his BBA from Marshall University.

Ashley married Anita Harold in 1981. She would later be elected to the state's fifth judicial circuit court, covering the counties of Calhoun, Jackson, Mason, and his native Roane.

Ashley died in Charleston on May 14, 2024, at the age of 70.

== Elections ==
- 2012 Ashley was unopposed for the May 8, 2012 Republican Primary, winning with 1,475 votes; returning 2010 opponent Mark Myers ran as the Mountain Party candidate, setting up a rematch. Ashley won the November 6, 2012 General election with 4,699 votes (81.1%) against Myers.
- 1980s and 1990s Ashley was initially elected in the 1984 Republican Primary and November 6, 1984 General election, and re-elected in the general elections of November 4, 1986, November 8, 1988, November 6, 1990, November 2, 1992, November 8, 1994, and November 5, 1996.
- 1998 Ashley was unopposed for the 1998 Republican Primary but lost the November 3, 1998 General election to Democratic nominee Oscar Hines.
- 2000 Ashley and Representative Hines were both unopposed for their 2000 primaries, setting up a rematch; Ashley won the November 7, 2000 General election against Representative Hines.
- 2002 Ashley was unopposed for the 2002 Republican Primary and was re-elected in the November 5, 2002 General election against Democratic nominee Bill Groves.
- 2004 Ashley was unopposed for both the 2004 Republican Primary and the November 2, 2004 General election.
- 2006 Ashley was unopposed for both the 2006 Republican Primary and the November 7, 2006 General election.
- 2008 Ashley was unopposed for both the May 13, 2008 Republican Primary, winning with 1,513 votes, and the November 4, 2008 General election, winning with 4,983 votes.
- 2010 Ashley was unopposed for the May 11, 2010 Republican Primary, winning with 1,069 votes, and won the November 2, 2010 General election with 3,266 votes (80.9%) against Mountain Party candidate Mark Myers.
