= List of Fairmont State University people =

This is a list of notable people associated with Fairmont State University in Fairmont, West Virginia, United States.

== Faculty ==
=== Administration ===
- Janet Dudley-Eshbach, former president
- Stacey Franklin Jones, vice president
- Luella Mundel, former head of the art department
- Joseph Rosier, former president

=== Academics ===
- Gayle Conelly Manchin, faculty member
- Louise McNeill, former professor
- Ruth Ann Musick, former professor, noted folklorist and author
- Beulah Boyd Ritchie, former professor, a founding member of the Fairmont Woman Suffrage Club (later the Fairmont Political Equality Club)

=== Athletics ===
==== Basketball ====
- Jerrod Calhoun, former head basketball coach
- Jasper Colebank, former head basketball coach and athletic director
- Joe Mazzulla, former assistant and head basketball coach
- Squibb Wilson, former assistant basketball coach and athletic director

==== Football ====
- Ty Clarke, former head football coach
- Mike Compton, former offensive line coach
- Jovan Dewitt, former running back coach
- Travis Everhart, former offensive line coach

== Alumni ==
=== Athletics ===
==== Basketball ====
- Taiwo Badmus, small forward for Valur
- Stevie Browning, former shooting guard for Ovarense Basquetebol
- Shawn Finney, former head coach of Tulane Green Wave men's basketball
- Leroy Loggins, American professional basketball player in Australia
- Thad McFadden, point guard for Basket Zaragoza
- Jamel Morris, shooting guard for Élan Chalon
- RJ Sunahara, former college basketball player under Joe Mazzulla

==== Football ====
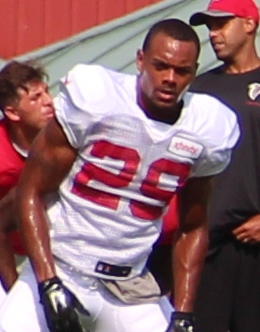
C. J. Goodwin

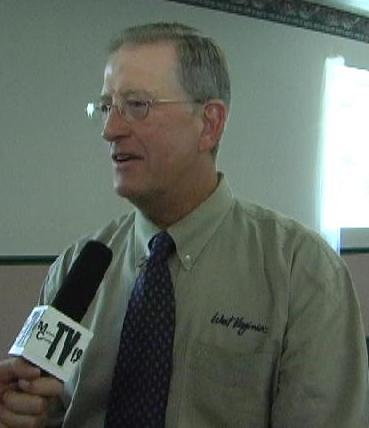
Bill Stewart

- Harold "Deacon" Duvall, former head coach for Fairmont State Fighting Falcons
- C. J. Goodwin, cornerback for Dallas Cowboys
- Fabian Guerra, wide receiver for San Antonio Gunslingers
- Ed Hodgkiss, former head coach for Los Angeles Avengers, former offensive coordinator for Indiana Firebirds
- Mike Kellar, football head coach for Glenville State Pioneers, former for Lenoir–Rhyne Bears football and Concord Mountain Lions
- David "Tuffy" Knight, former coach in Canadian university footbal
- Jim Lipinski, former defensive lineman for Calgary Stampeders
- Dewey McDonald, former NFL linebacker for Seattle Seahawks
- Jim Mertens, former American Football League wide receiver for the Miami Dolphins
- Rich Newbrough, former coach in Canadian university football
- Don Overton, former NFL running back for Detroit Lions
- Jacob Owens, former NFL defensive lineman for New York Jets
- Bill Stewart, former head football coach at West Virginia University
- Luc Tousignant, former NFL quarterback for Buffalo Bills
- Jason Woodman, football head coach for Morehead State
- Fielding H. Yost, former football head coach for Michigan Wolverines football, Kansas Jayhawks football, Nebraska Cornhuskers football, and Stanford Cardinal football
- Chandler Zavala, NFL guard for Carolina Panthers

==== Other ====
- Perry Baker, current U.S. international rugby sevens player and two-time World Rugby Sevens Player of the Year

=== Entertainment ===
- Luke Gallows, former WWE wrestler
- Guy McElroy, African-American art historian and curator, known for the major exhibition titled Facing History: The Black Image in American Art, 1710-1940
- Herbert Morrison, radio reporter whose voice is heard in the footage of the Hindenburg disaster

=== Politics ===
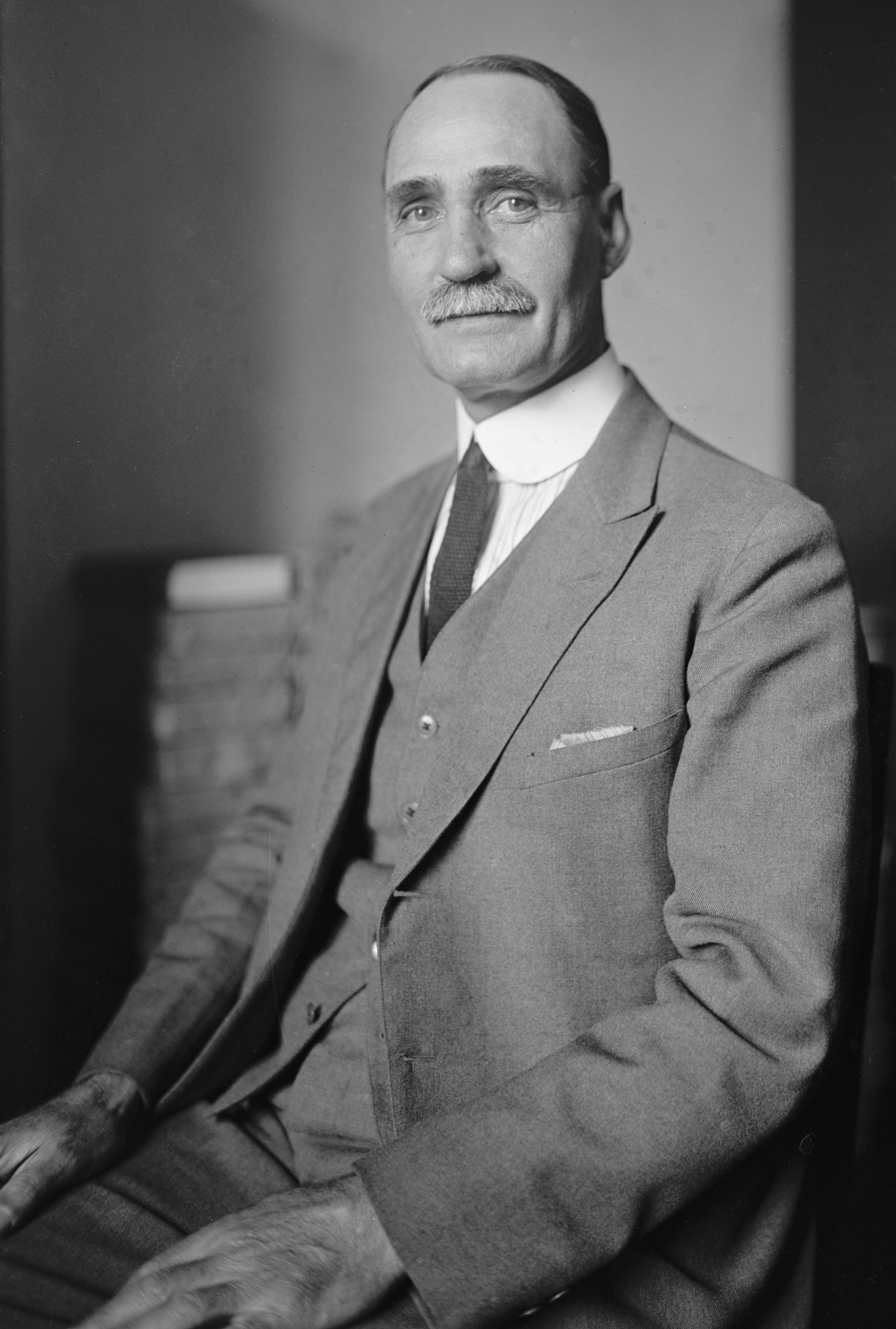
Robert E. Lee Allen

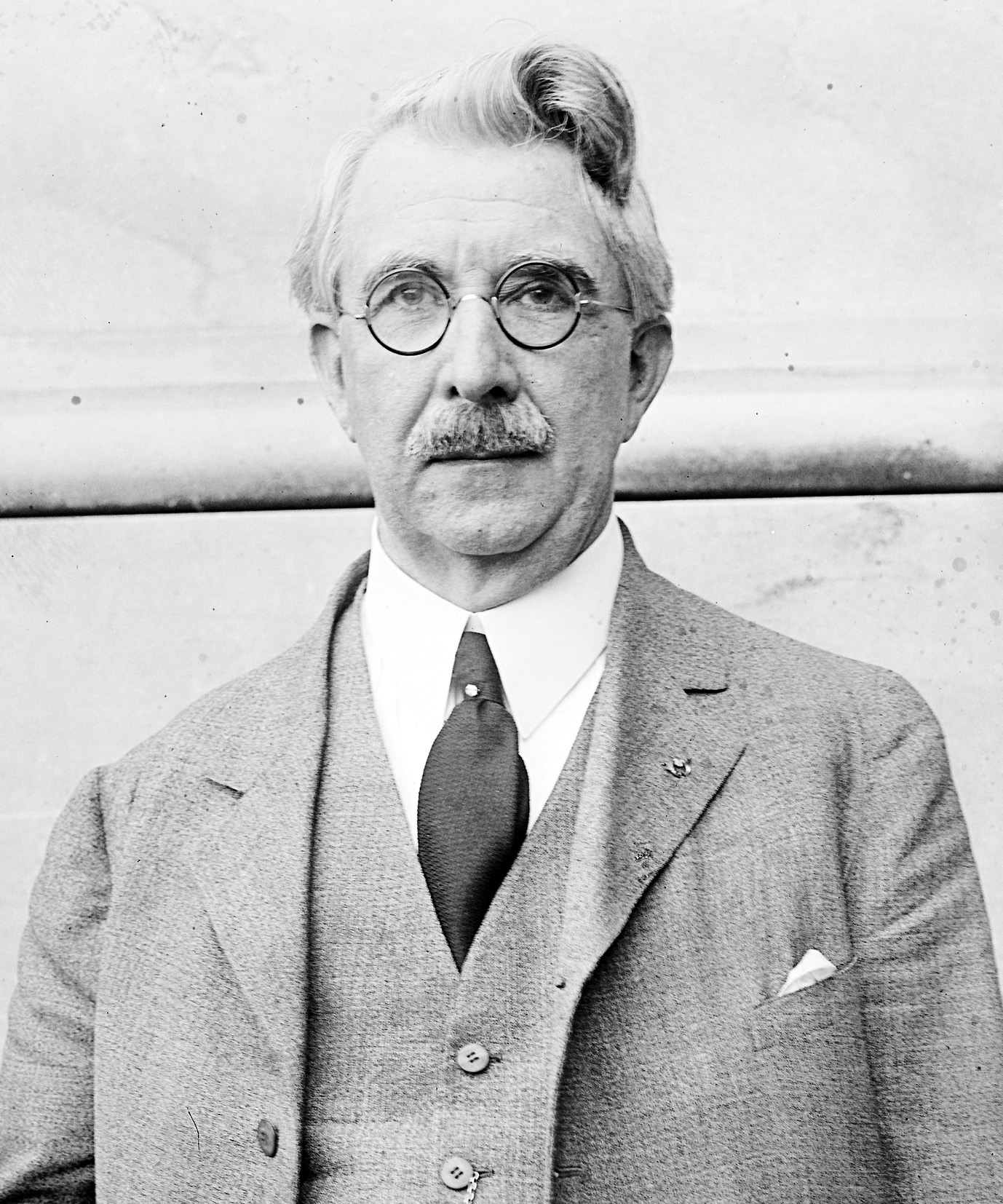
Stuart F. Reed

- Robert E. Lee Allen, former US representative for West Virginia
- William O. Atkeson, former US representative for Missouri
- Bob Beach, former member of West Virginia Senate and West Virginia House of Delegates
- Wendell R. Beitzel, member of Maryland House of Delegates
- Belinda Biafore, former chair of West Virginia Democratic Party
- Larry J. Edgell, former member of West Virginia Senate
- George C. Edwards, member of Maryland State Senate
- Danny Hamrick, former member of West Virginia House of Delegates
- Frank Cruise Haymond, former justice, Supreme Court of Appeals of West Virginia
- Richard Iaquinta, former member of West Virginia House of Delegates
- David Koon, former member of New York State Assembly
- Thomas Demetrios Lambros, former chief judge of United States District Court for the Northern District of Ohio
- Linda Longstreth, former member of West Virginia House of Delegates
- Ephraim F. Morgan, former governor of West Virginia
- Alberta Ramage Neely, former first lady of West Virginia
- Jack Robert Nuzum, former circuit judge of Randolph County, West Virginia
- Stuart F. Reed, former US representative, West Virginia Senate, and secretary of state of West Virginia
- Thomas S. Riley, former attorney general of West Virginia
- Ira E. Robinson, former West Virginia politician and judge, first chairman of the Federal Radio Commission
- Roxann Robinson, former member of Virginia House of Delegates
- James Shaner, former member of Pennsylvania House of Representatives
- Charles Sheedy, member of the West Virginia House of Delegates
- John Taylor, former member of Iowa Senate
- Ryan Weld, majority whip of the West Virginia Senate
- Bob Williams, former member of West Virginia Senate
- John M. Wolverton, former US representative for West Virginia

=== Other ===
- William Jaco, mathematician, known for his role in the Jaco–Shalen–Johannson decomposition theorem and efficient triangulations of 3-manifolds
- Mark Manchin, former president of Glenville State University
- Howard Llewellyn Swisher, former, businessperson, real estate developer, orchardist, editor, writer, and historian
