= Rich Newbrough =

American-Canadian football player and coach (1937–2024)

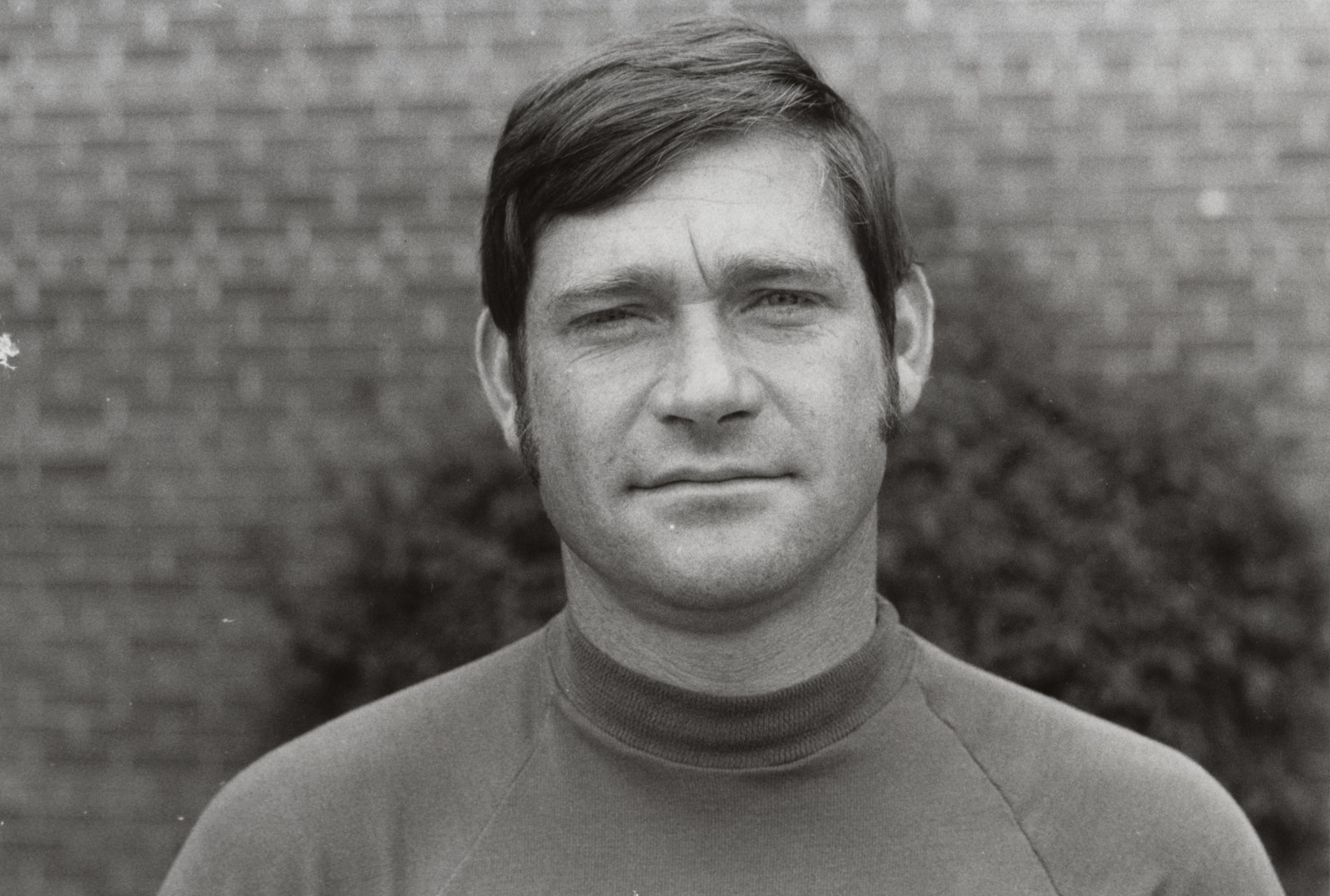
- Newbrough circa 1969–1972

Personal information
- Born: February 15, 1937; Clarksburg, West Virginia, U.S.
- Died: June 29, 2024 (aged 87); Waterloo, Ontario, Canada

Career information
- High school: Bridgeport (Bridgeport, West Virginia)
- College: Fairmont State College (1955–1959)

Career history

Coaching
- 1968–1983: Crooksville High School (AC)
- 1968–1983: Waterloo Lutheran/Wilfrid Laurier Golden Hawks (AC)
- 1984–1993: Wilfrid Laurier Golden Hawks (HC)
- 2006–2007: Wilfrid Laurier Golden Hawks (STC)

Operations
- 1984–1997: Wilfrid Laurier Golden Hawks (AD)

Earl Richard Newbrough (February 15, 1937 – June 29, 2024) was an American Canadian university football coach and former college football player. He served in various coaching roles at Waterloo Lutheran/Wilfrid Laurier University from 1968 to 1993, including as head coach from 1984 until 1993. During his 29-year tenure, he also served as athletic director from 1984 to 1997. As head coach, Newbrough led the Golden Hawks to winning seasons in all but one year, including a national championship in 1991, the program's first. He was named the CIAU Coach of the Year in 1991. Newbrough secured two Yates Cup Ontario championships in 1987 and 1991.

== Early life ==
Newbrough was born and raised in Clarksburg, West Virginia, graduating at Bridgeport High School. Earl attended Fairmont State College where he played on the football program from 1955 until 1959, winning a WVIAC championship in the process with, future WLU Golden Hawks coach, David Knight, by going a perfect 7–0 record, in 1957. Newbrough would be retroactively inducted into the program's hall of fame in 2011. Following college, he was commissioned an officer in the United States Marine Corps during which he travelled throughout Southeast Asia.

== Coaching career ==
=== Crooksville High School ===
After military service, Newbrough reconnected with Knight as a teacher and football coach at Crooksville High School from 1962 to 1963, where they won back-to-back Muskingum Valley League championships and a state championship in the latter year.

=== Waterloo Lutheran/Wilfrid Laurier Golden Hawks ===
==== Assistant Coach ====
After a stint in sales at Colgate Palmolive, Earl joined Knight in Canada to join Waterloo Lutheran University in 1968. Fairmont State alumni graduate, Fred Nichols, was also a factor in the decision. Newbrough was the assistant coach at WLU from 1968 to 1983, being part of three Vanier Cup appearances and two Yates Cup championships under head coach Knight.

==== Head coach ====
===== 1984–1986 =====
In Spring 1984, Knight announced their resignation from the head coaching position to become director of player personnel for the Toronto Argonauts of the Canadian Football League, making Newbrough the new person in charge of the football program. As head coach, Newbrough led the Golden Hawks to winning seasons in all but one year during his tenure. In 1984, Laurier finished their season with a 2-win campaign, missing the playoffs. The following year, the Golden Hawks concluded with a 6–1 record, finishing second in the Ontario University Athletics Association (OUAA). They beat the York Yeomen in the semifinals, 27–10, before bowing to the Western Mustangs in the conference championship, 19–16. 1986 concluded with Newbrough and the Hawks at a 4–3 record, good enough for third in the conference. They qualified for the playoffs, losing to Guelph Gryphons in the OUAA Semifinals, 36–15.

===== First Yates Championship (1987) =====
After an early exit in the playoffs, the Golden Hawks started the 1987 season with a 23–9 home opener loss to Western. For the rest of the season, Wilfrid Laurier won their next 6 games, outscoring their opponents by an average of 40.8 points per game, as they finished 6–1. In the OUAA Semifinals, The Golden Hawks defeated the Windsor Lancers, 32-13, setting themselves with Guelph, who upset No. 1 Western with a losing record, in the OUAA Finals. A 28-15 final score granted Wilfrid Laurier their first Yates Cup since 1978 and their first under Newbrough. In his first playoff game, the Golden Hawks fell to the UBC Thunderbirds, 33–31 in the CIAU Semifinals.

The following season, Wilfrid Laurier finished 6-1 and advanced through the OUAA playoffs, only to lose to Western in the OUAA Yates Cup Finals. 1989 was the second-worst season displayed in Newbrough's head coaching career at the university as the Golden Hawks finished with a losing record, unable to qualify in the playoffs. 1990 was not great either for Wilfrid Laurier as after winning the first two games of the season, they stumbled through the standings, finishing their season at 4–3 overall. In the OUAA Semifinals, Western ended their season with a 23–18 loss to the Western Mustangs in the OUAA Semifinals.

===== National Championship (1991) =====
Laurier players and coaches entered the 1991 off-season hoping to improve upon their disappointing season the year before, and were voted the No. 7 team in the country in the annual CIAU preseason poll. Wilfrid Laurier had greatly surpassed its expectation as the No. 7 ranked team in the country, winning their first four games of the season, starting with defeating Guelph at Seagram Stadium. The following three weeks saw explosion of as Laurier routed the McMaster, Windsor, which was the 40th win in Newbrough's tenure at WLU, and the Toronto. In Week 5, Wilfrid Laurier lost to Larry Haylor's Western Mustangs at J. W. Little Memorial Stadium. After a dominant victory over the York Yeomen, the Golden Hawks were blown out by their rivals, Waterloo to conclude the regular season.

The OUAA playoffs saw the Golden Hawks on a streak, blowing out Waterloo, upsetting No. 1 ranked Western in the Yates Cup, and Queen's in the CIAU Semifinals, finding themselves in the 27th Vanier Cup for the fourth time in the team's history. After the win against the Mustangs, the polls awarded Wilfrid Laurier No. 1 in the CIAU rankings heading into the championship game. A few days before the national championship game, Newbrough, was named CIAU Coach of the Year, the second coach in team history to be honoured up to that point, after Knight. In the Vanier Cup, the Golden Hawks defeated the Mount Allison Mounties by a score of 25–18. With the win, Wilfrid Laurier clinched the national championship, the team's first in its history. Prior to the season, Newbrough promised to have his head shaved after a championship and lived up to it.

==== Final Years ====
Richbrough entered the 1992 season with hopes of following up the team's victory in the Vanier Cup with another national championship. The Laurier's regular-season performance improved slightly from 1991, as they won an extra regular-season game against York. After a 6-win campaign, the Golden Hawks finished second in the OUAA, behind the Toronto, ranked at No. 3 in the country. However, Laurier's dream to repeat falls short as they were upset in the OUAA Semifinals by Western at Seagram Stadium. In 1993, the Golden Hawks conclude their season with a 5-win campaign in 7 games, earning themselves a spot in the OUAA playoffs, only to lose in the semifinals to the Varsity Blues, despite leading the game by 10 points. After 9 seasons of coaching, and 26 seasons in the university's program, Newbrough resigned as head coach in November 1993, remaining as the university athletic director until July 1997, the CIAU Board of Directors and as executive vice-president of the OUAA. He finished his career with 55 wins and 30 losses as head coach of the Golden Hawks.

== Personal life ==
Newbrough was married for 59 years before his wife, Patricia, died after a brief battle of cancer in December 2018. The couple had 2 children. Upon his retirement as, the OUAA honoured Newbrough with the J.P Loosemore Award. In 1998, Wilfrid Laurier University inducted him into the builders category of the Golden Hawk Hall of Fame. He received a lifetime Legend of Laurier football award in 2021.

=== Death ===
Newbrough died from an illness in Waterloo on 29 June 2024, at the age of 87.

== Head coaching record ==
Team	Year	Regular season						Postseason			
Team	Year	Games	Won	Lost	Ties	Win %	Finish	Won	Lost	Win %	Result
LAU	1984	7	2	5	0	.286	5th	–	–	–	Missed Playoffs
LAU	1985	7	6	1	0	.857	2nd	1	1	.500	Lost OUAA Finals (WES)
LAU	1986	7	4	3	0	.571	3rd	0	1	.000	Lost OUAA Semifinals (GUE)
LAU	1987	7	6	1	0	.857	2nd	2	1	.667	Lost CIAU Semifinals (UBC)
LAU	1988	7	6	1	0	.857	2nd	1	1	.500	Lost OUAA Finals (WES)
LAU	1989	7	3	4	0	.300	5th	–	–	–	Missed Playoffs
LAU	1990	7	4	3	0	.571	4th	0	1	.000	Lost OUAA Semifinals (WES)
LAU	1991	7	5	2	0	.714	3rd	4	0	1.000	Won Vanier Cup (MTA)
LAU	1992	7	6	1	0	.857	2nd	0	1	.000	Lost OUAA Semifinals (WES)
LAU	1993	7	5	2	0	.714	3rd	0	1	.000	Lost OUAA Semifinals (TOR)
Total		70	47	23	0	.671		8	7	.533	
