= Fairmont Normal School Administration Building =

- U.S. National Register of Historic Places
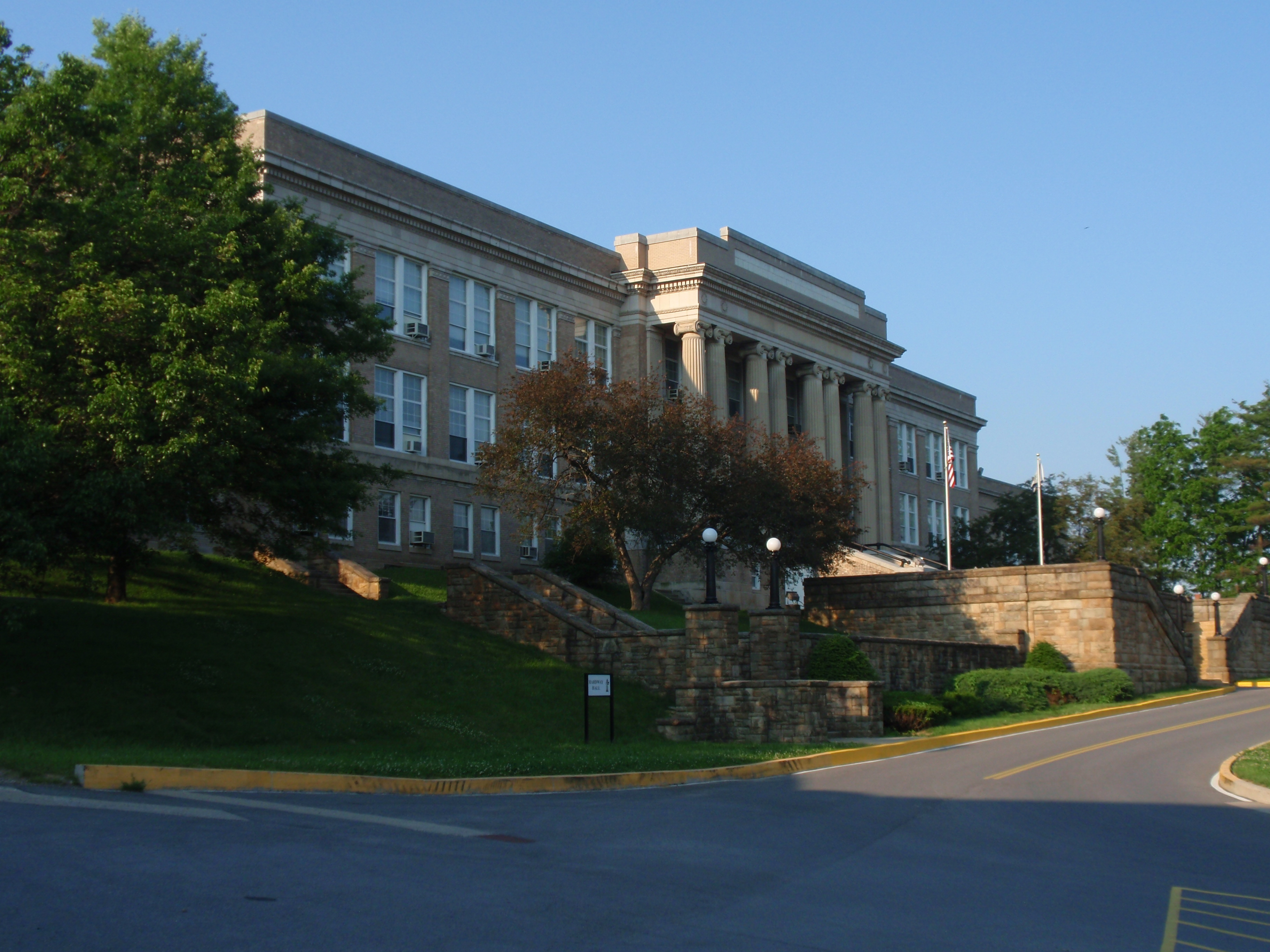
- Administration Building, now Hardway Hall, in 2008

- Location within West Virginia Location within the United States
- Location: Jct. of Locust Ave. and Bryant St., Fairmont, West Virginia
- Coordinates: 39°28′59″N 80°9′37″W
- Area: 1.5 acres (0.61 ha)
- Built: 1917
- Architect: Paul A. Davis III
- Architectural style: Classical Revival
- NRHP reference No.: 94000216
- Added to NRHP: March 28, 1994

Fairmont Normal School Administration Building is a historic school building located on the campus of Fairmont State University at Fairmont, Marion County, West Virginia. It was built between 1915 and 1917, and is a large three-story Classical Revival style building sited atop a hill overlooking Locust Avenue. Its light coated brick exterior walls are ornamented with limestone and terra cotta details. Its front features a portico with eight Ionic order columns with shafts made of Indiana Blue Limestone. The original building measured 265 feet by 65 feet; the west wing was added in 1927.

The building was renamed Hardway Hall in 1989 for Wendell G. Hardway, a former president of Fairmont State College. It was listed on the National Register of Historic Places in 1994.
