= Jacob Owens =

American football player (born 1984)

Profile
- Position: Defensive lineman

Personal information
- Born: October 10, 1984 (age 42); Franklin, West Virginia, U.S.
- Listed height: 6 ft 2 in (1.88 m)
- Listed weight: 180 lb (82 kg)

Career information
- High school: Pendleton County (Franklin, West Virginia)
- College: Fairmont State
- NFL draft: 2008: undrafted

Career history
- New York Jets (2008)*; Spokane Shock (2009)
- * Offseason or practice squad member only

Awards and highlights
- First-team All-WVIAC (2007); Third-team All-Northeast Region; 2007 East Coast All-Star Bowl; 2008 Cactus Bowl

Jacob Owens (born October 10, 1984) is an American former football defensive lineman. He played college football at Fairmont State. Owens was unselected in the 2008 NFL draft but received a tryout with the New York Jets but was released before the season began.

== Early life ==
Owens attended Pendleton County High School, where he was a standout player. He lettered three times in football. He was also a two-time All-Conference selection. He was named All-State as a senior. He also lettered four times in basketball, and was a two-time All-Conference selection, he was also an All-State selection as a senior.

== College career ==
Owens then attended Fairmont State University, where he majored in Exercise Science. As a freshman in 2004, he played in 10 games and recorded five tackles. As a sophomore in 2005, he played and started in nine games, recording 40 tackles, 12 for loses, seven sacks, two passes broken-up, and one forced fumble. In 2006, as a junior, he started 11 games, recording 56 tackles, nine for loses, four sacks, six passes broken-up, and was an All-WVIAC Honorable mention. In 2007, he recorded 44 tackles, ll for loses and five sacks. He also played for the North team in the 2007 East Coast All-Star Bowl. He was also named to the 2008 Cactus Bowl East team. For his college career, he recorded 145 tackles, 16 sacks, 15 passes broken-up, and seven fumble recoveries.

== Professional career ==
Measureables
Ht.	Wt.	40 yd.	20 Shut.	Squat Max.	Vertical Jump	Bench Max.	Broad Jump
6'5"	272 lb.	4.88	X	635	X"	450	X"

=== National Football League ===
During the weeks prior too the 2008 NFL draft, Owens had received calls from numerous teams including; the Miami Dolphins, Philadelphia Eagles, Buffalo Bills, Baltimore Ravens, and Kansas City Chiefs. He was projected to go undrafted in the NFL Draft, and was, but later received a tryout with the New York Jets, however he was released shortly before the beginning of the season.

=== af2 ===
On October 7, 2008, he signed with the Spokane Shock of the af2 football league.
