= Facing History: The Black Image in American Art, 1710–1940 =

Art exhibition

Facing History: The Black Image in American Art, 1710–1940 was the first public exhibition by a major museum to showcase depictions of African Americans in American art. Facing History took place in 1990 and was held at the Corcoran Gallery of Art from January 13 through March 25, and then went to the Brooklyn Museum from April 20 through June 25. The curator of the exhibition, Guy McElroy, died during the Brooklyn portion on May 31.

== History ==
Facing History examined ways in which American artists "...reinforced a number of largely restrictive stereotypes of black identity." The exhibition featured eighty works in three media: drawings, paintings, and sculptures

Curator Guy McElroy viewed the exhibition as depicting the attitude of society toward African Americans through the works themselves and the response they received in the art market. They made overt political statements, as well as having addressed contemporary issues. Stereotypes, slavery, and violence dominated the images. However, as McElroy stated in the exhibition catalog:

Depictions of black people can no longer rely on gross distortions of physiognomy or character to achieve racially motivated humor, but the symbolic power of visual images remains insidious. Jim Crow, Uncle Tom, Mammy, the Comic Darkey and Zip Coon no longer dominate images of African-Americans in painting and sculpture, but their ghosts live on in a host of popular mediums, most notably in the violence of action serials and the stereotyped behavior of television sitcoms. — Guy McElroy, "Introduction: Race and Representation", Facing History, 1990

== Selected works ==
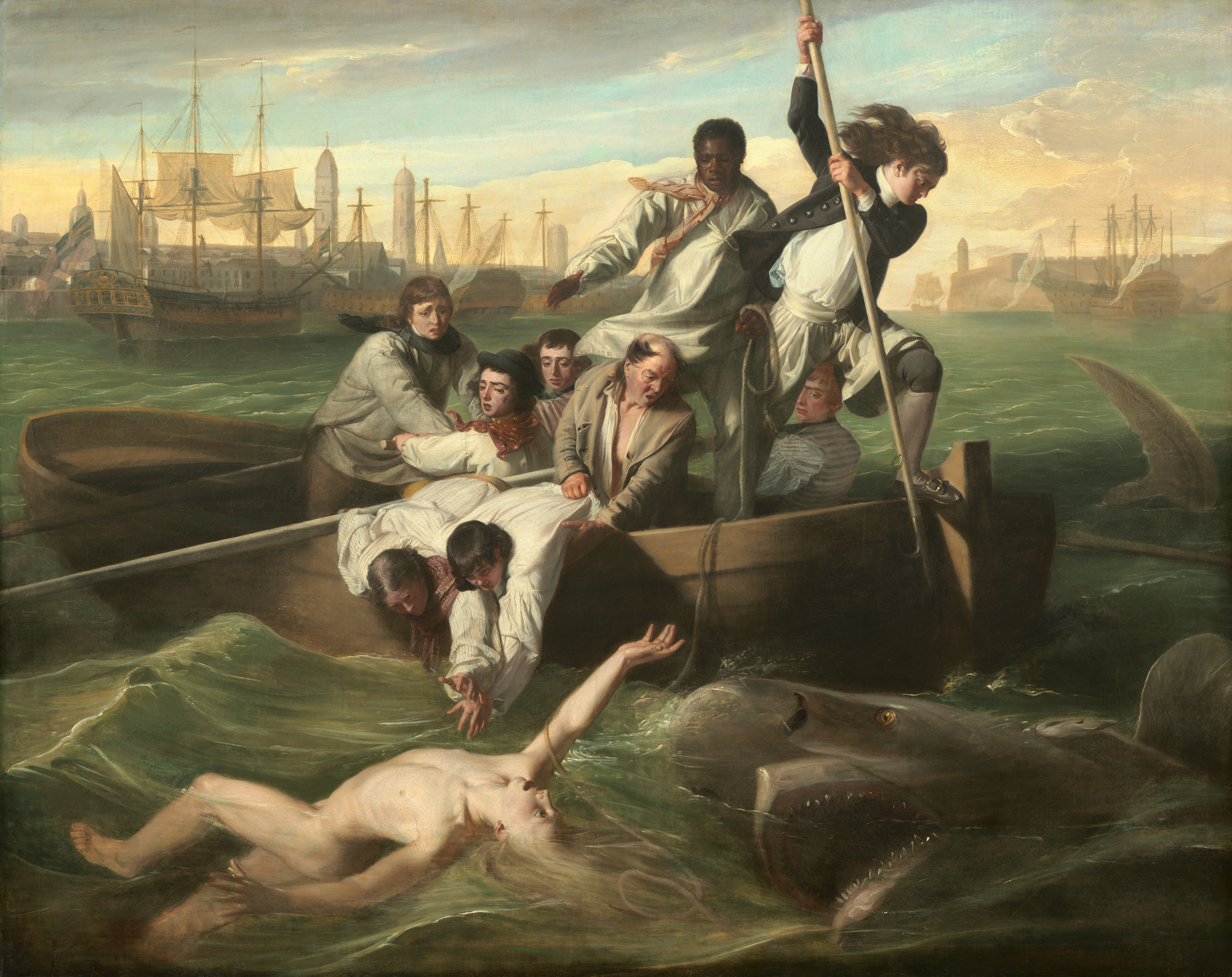
Watson and the Shark by John Singleton Copley, 1778

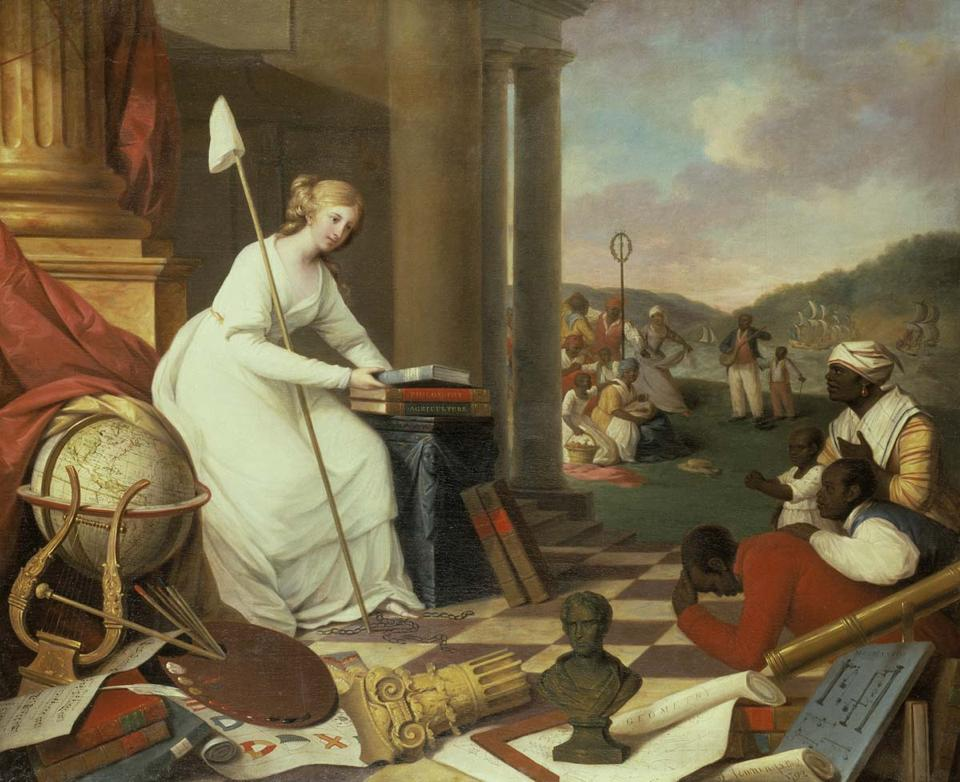
Liberty Displaying the Arts and Sciences by Samuel Jennings, 1792

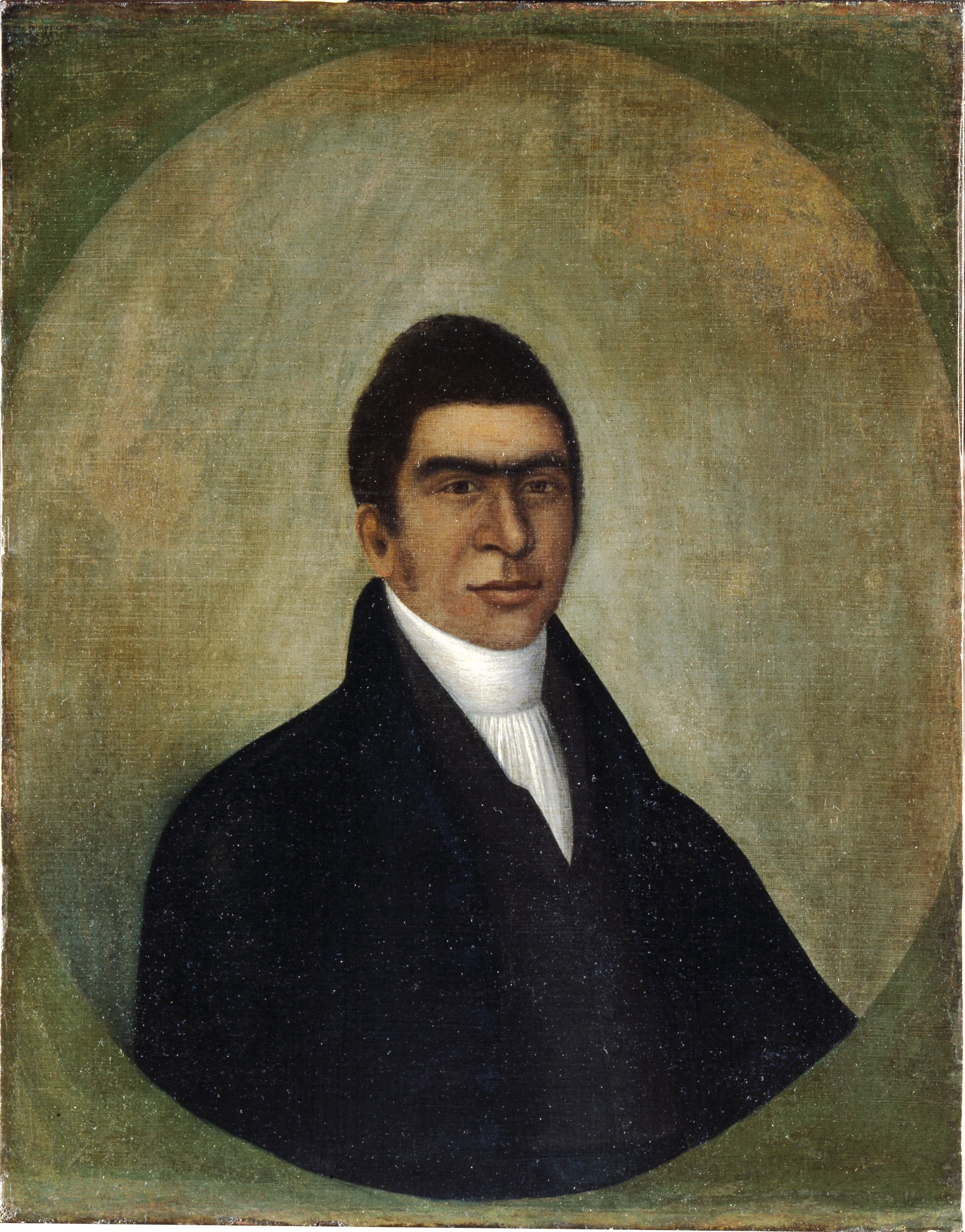
Abner Coker by Joshua Johnson, c. 1807

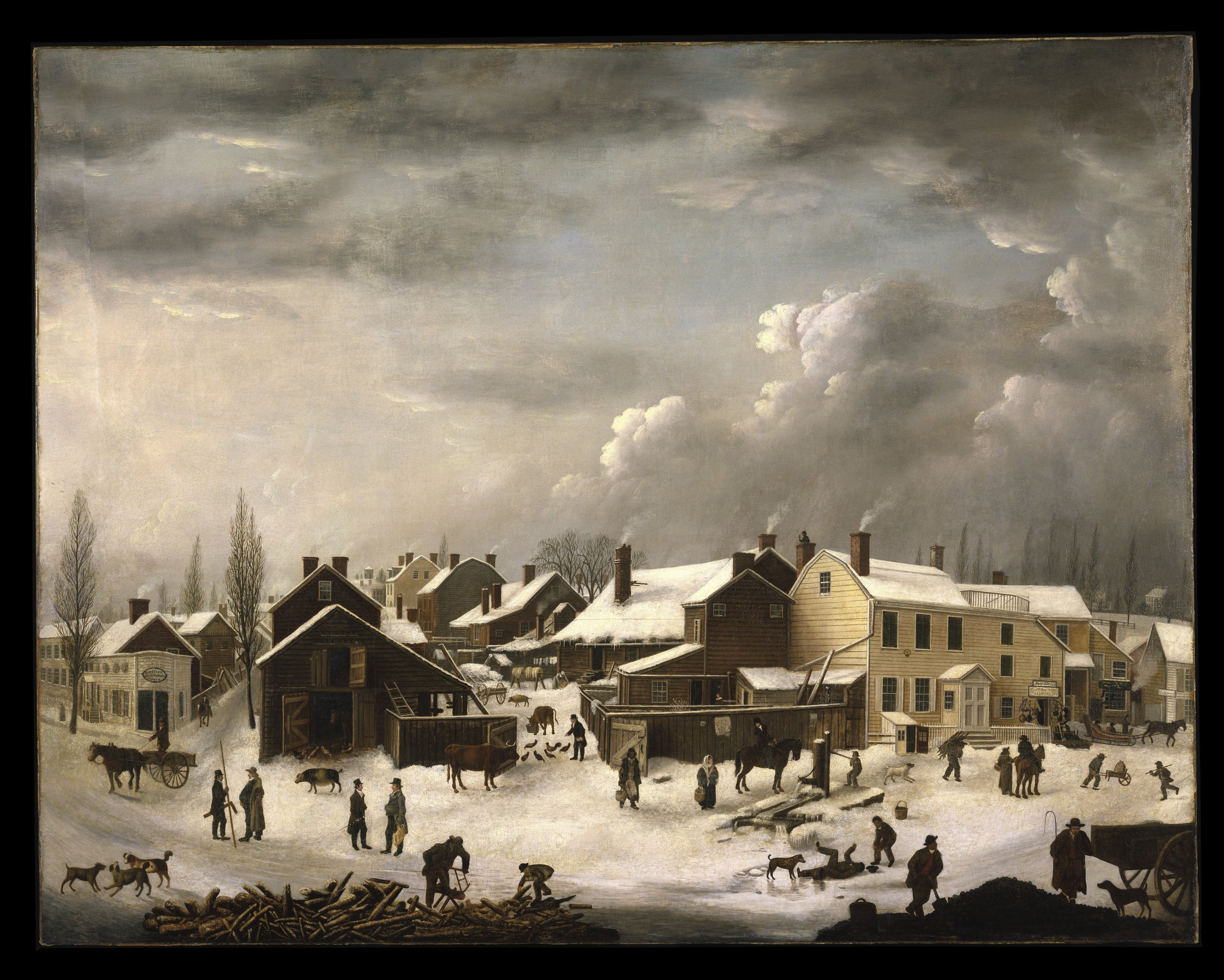
Winter Scene in Brooklyn by Francis Guy, c. 1820

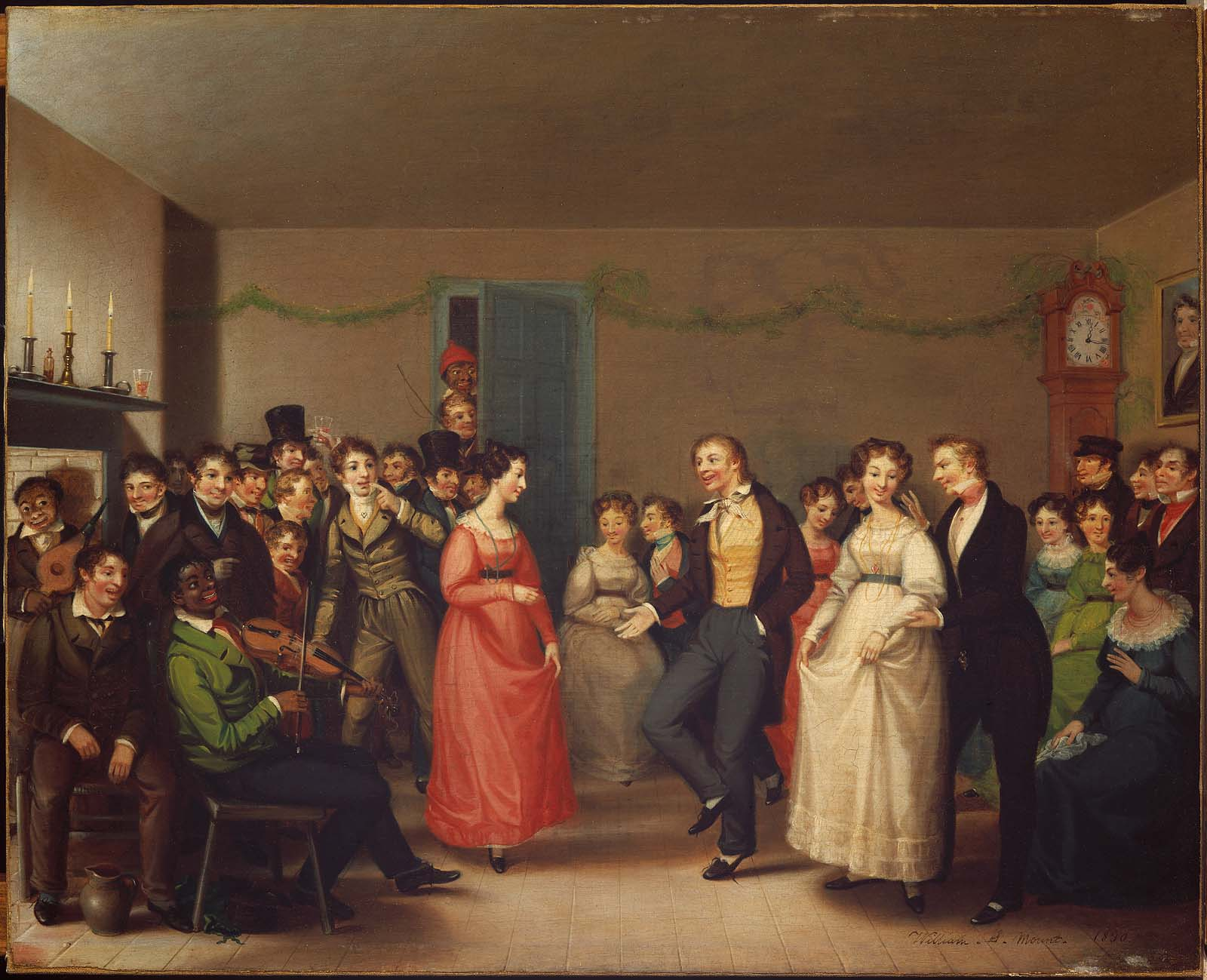
Rustic Dance After a Sleigh Ride by William Sidney Mount, 1830

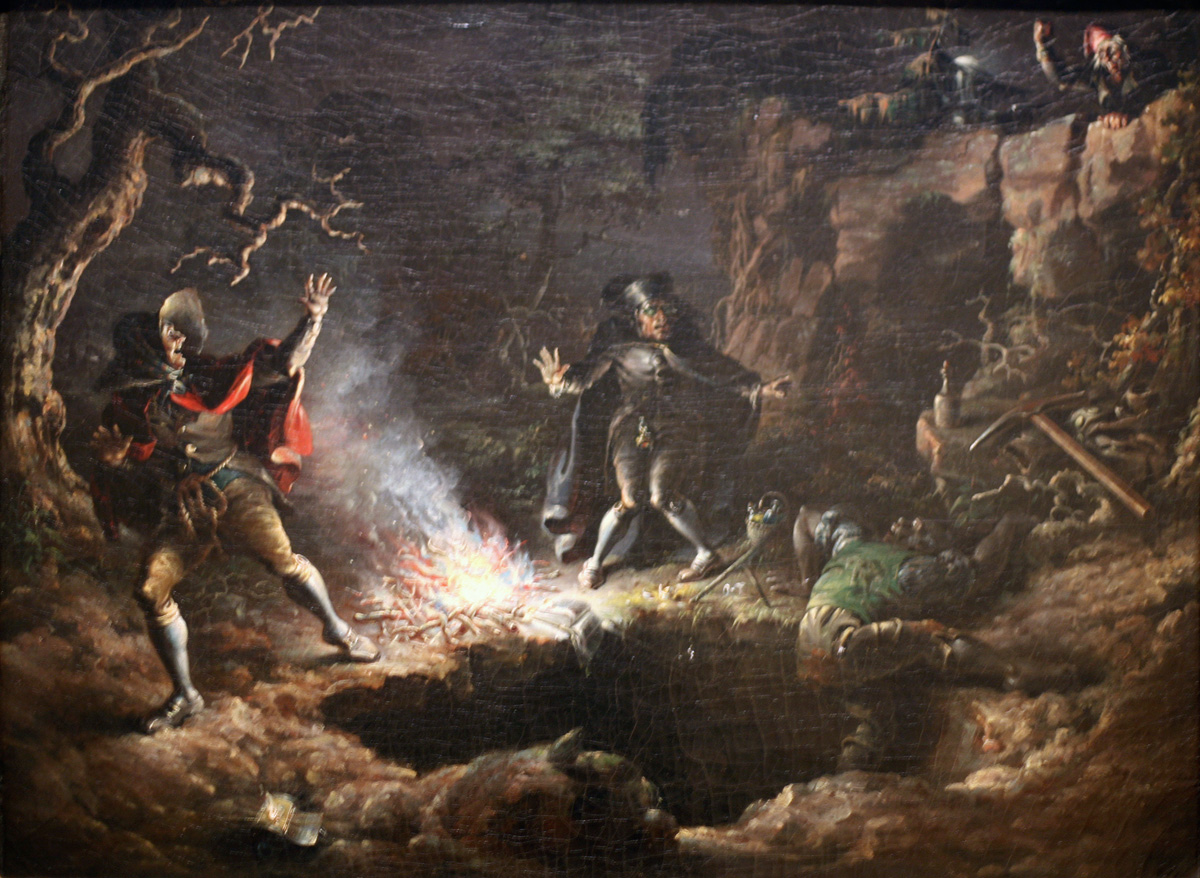
The Money Diggers by John Quidor, 1832

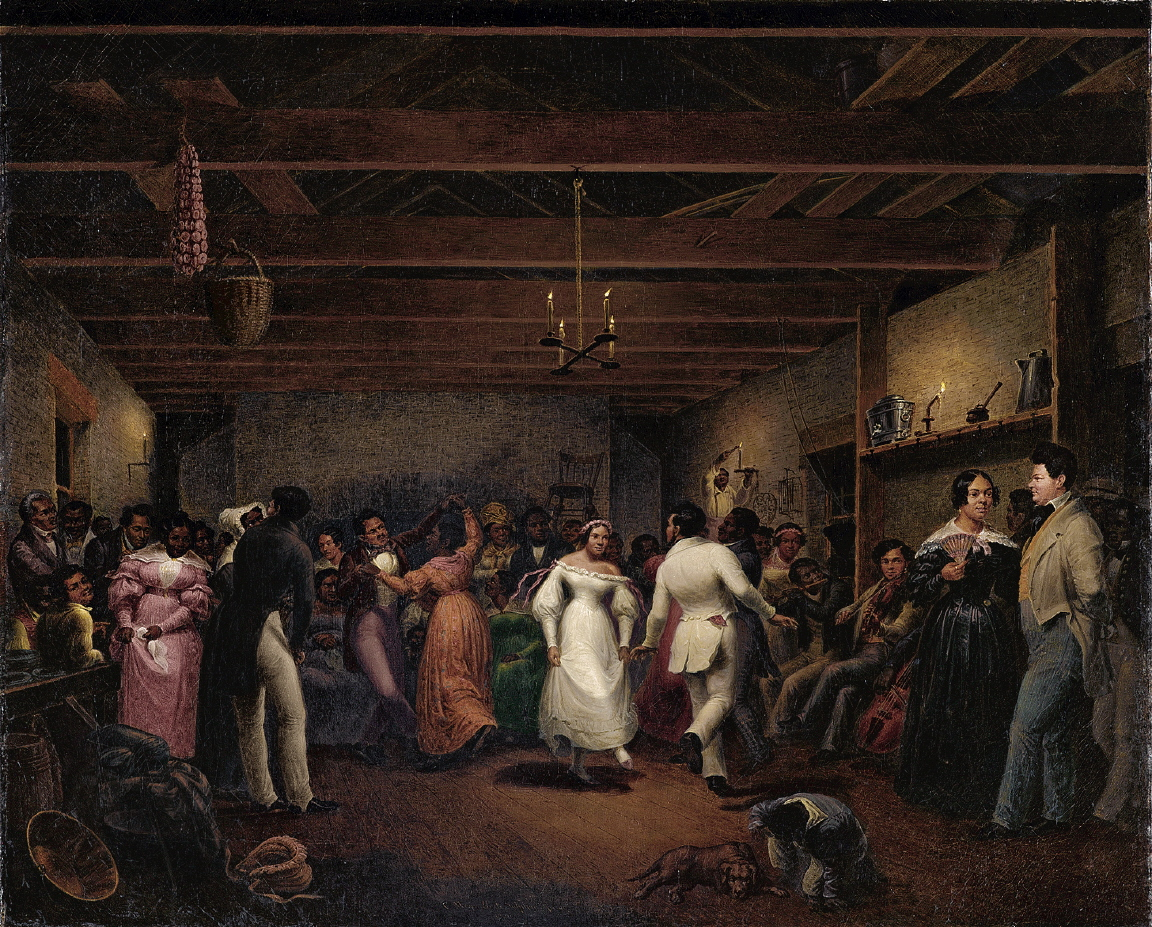
Kitchen Ball by Christian Friedrich Mayr, 1838

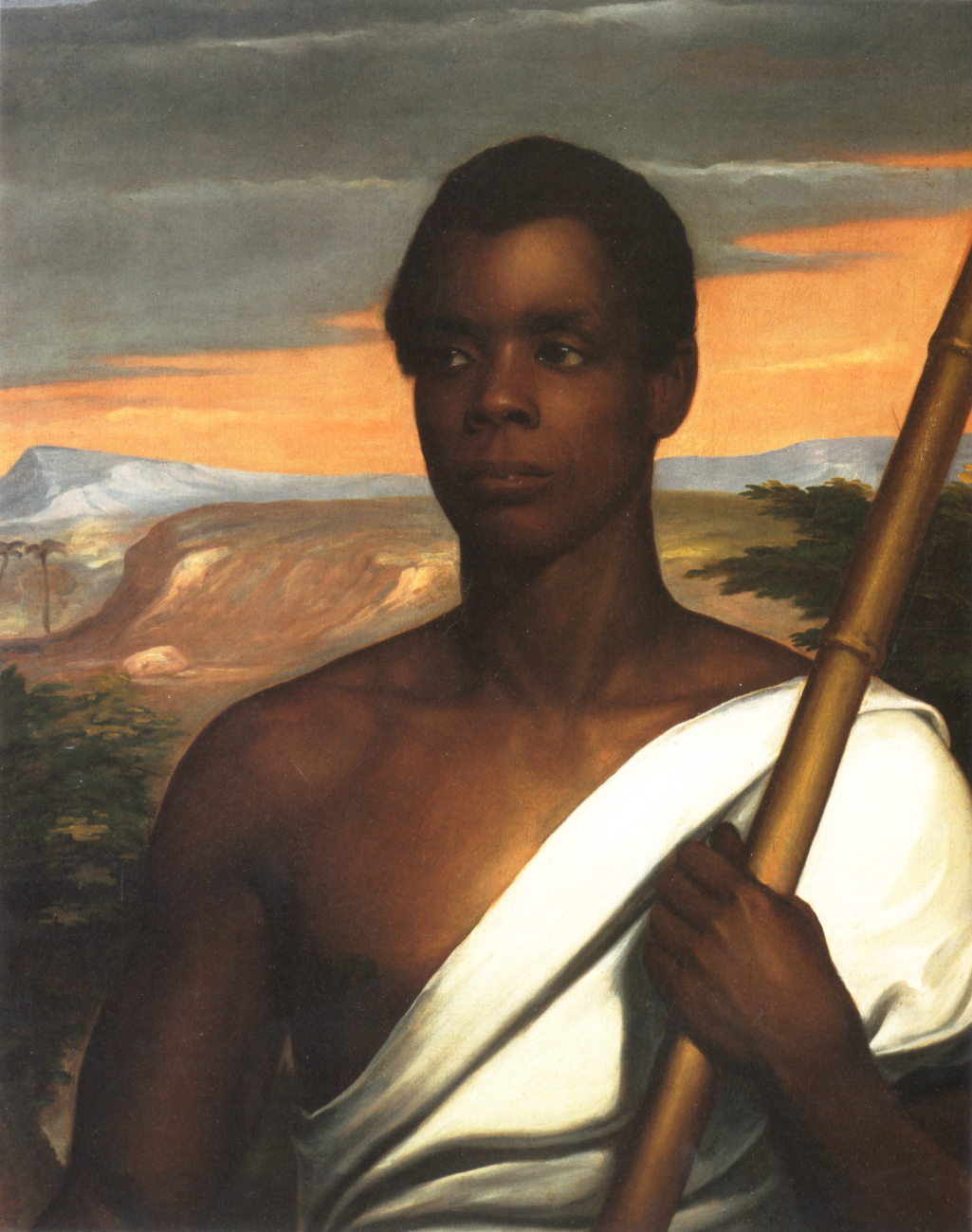
Joseph Cinqué by Nathaniel Jocelyn, 1840

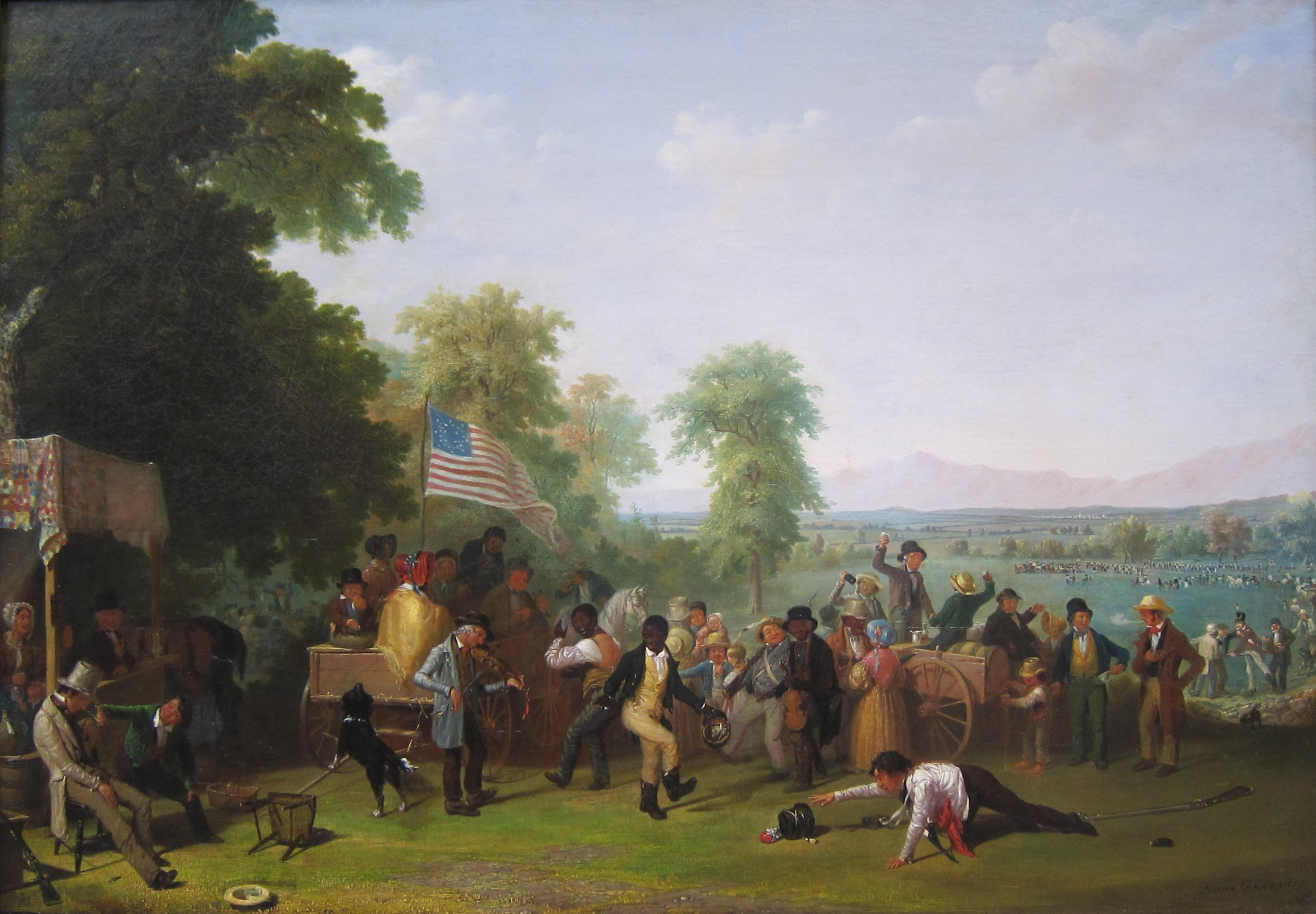
Militia Training by James Goodwyn Clonney, 1841

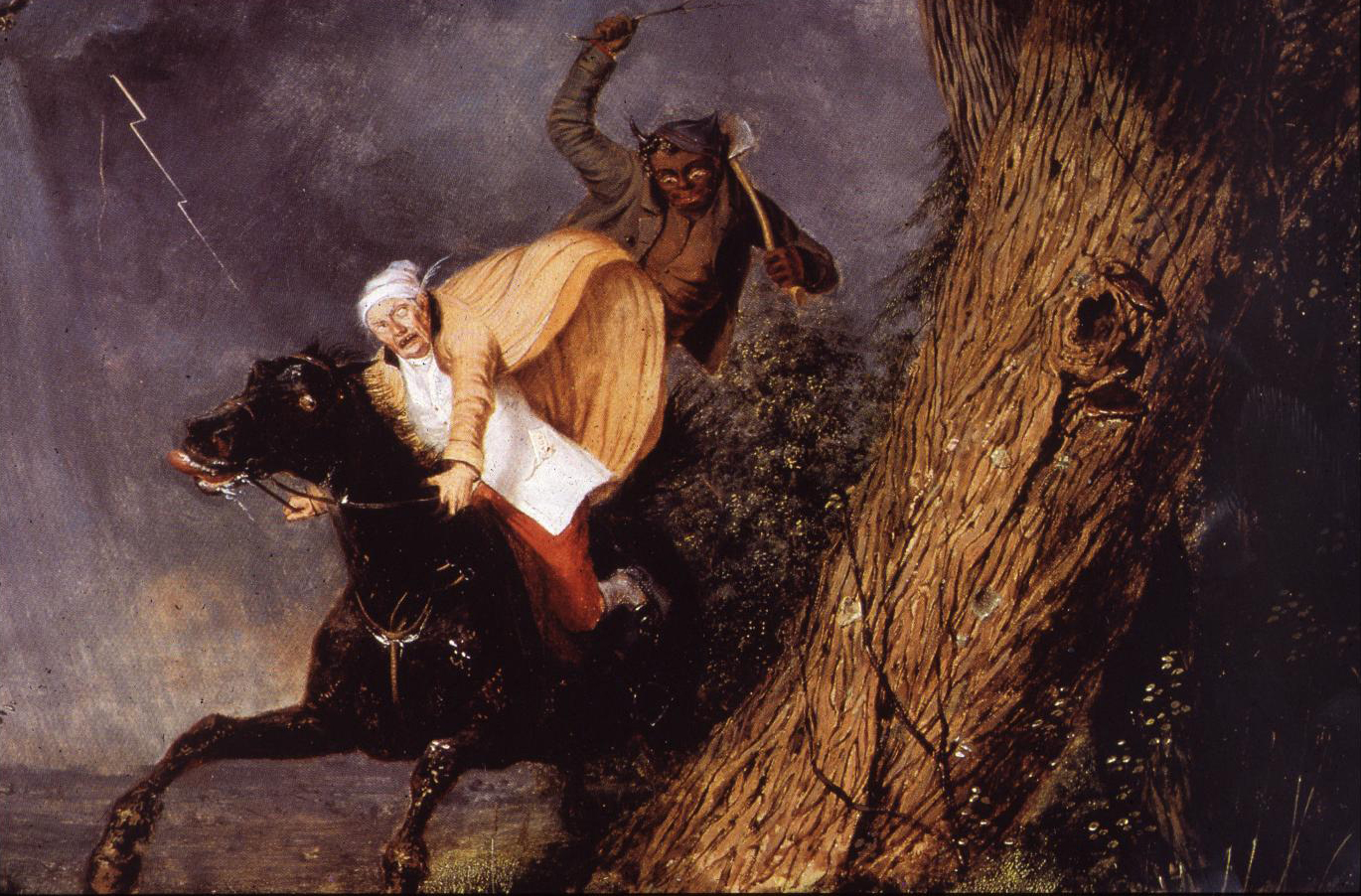
The Devil and Tom Walker by Charles Deas, 1843

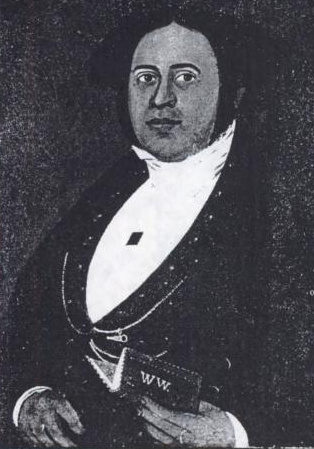
William Whipper by William Matthew Prior, 1845

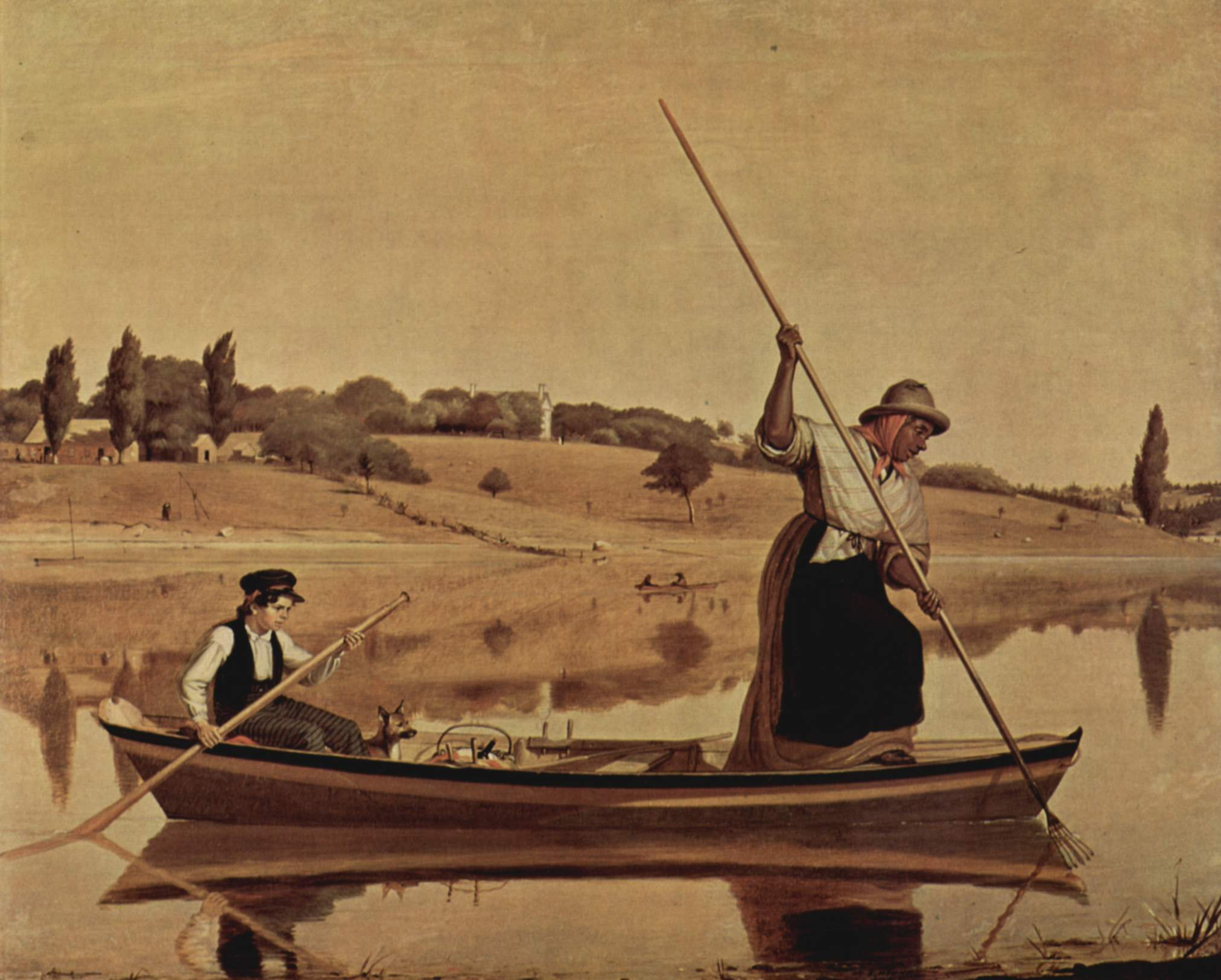
Eel Spearing at Setauket by William Sidney Mount, 1845

The Power of Music by William Sidney Mount, 1847

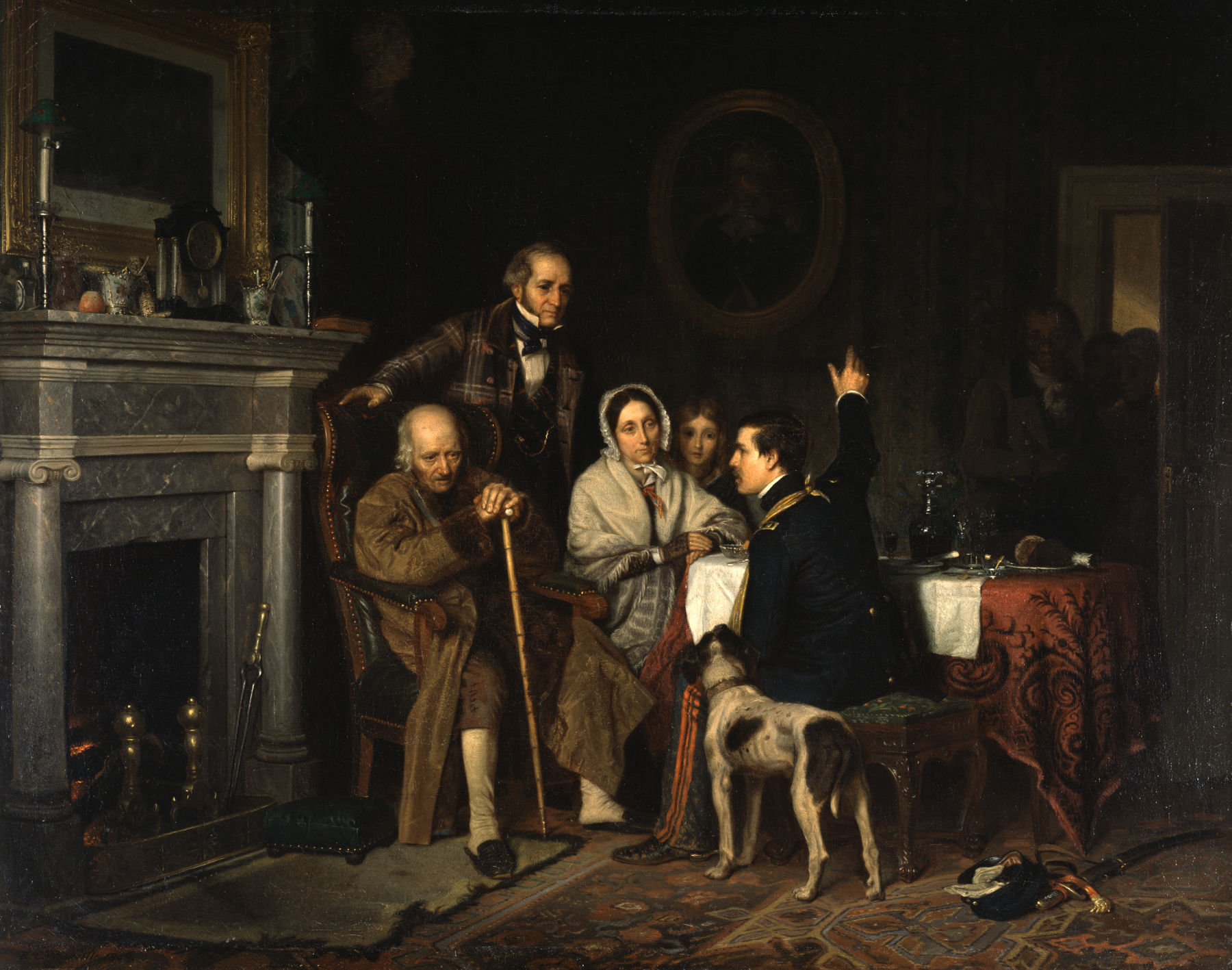
Old and Young 48 by Richard Caton Woodville, Sr., 1849

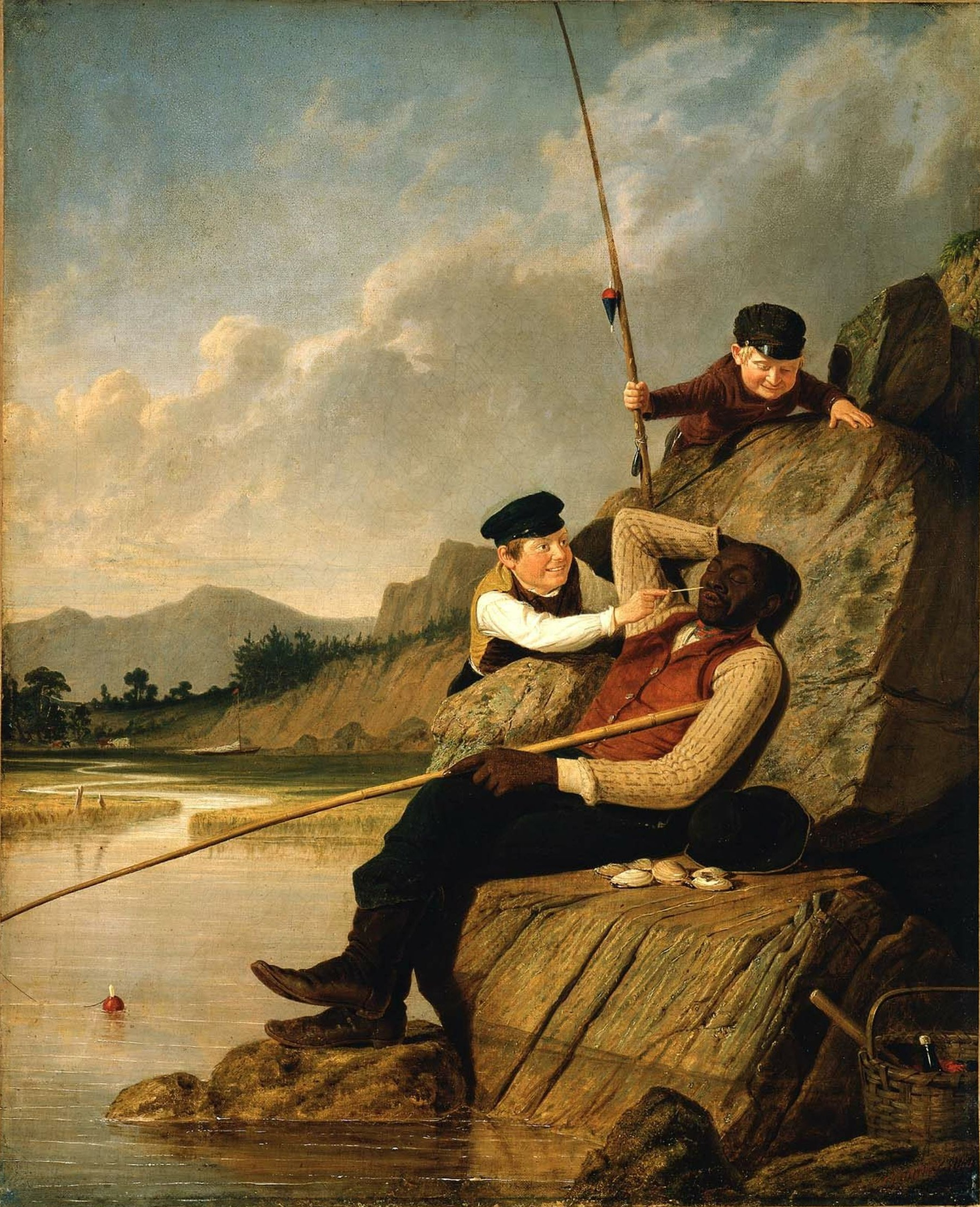
Waking Up by James Goodwyn Clonney, 1851

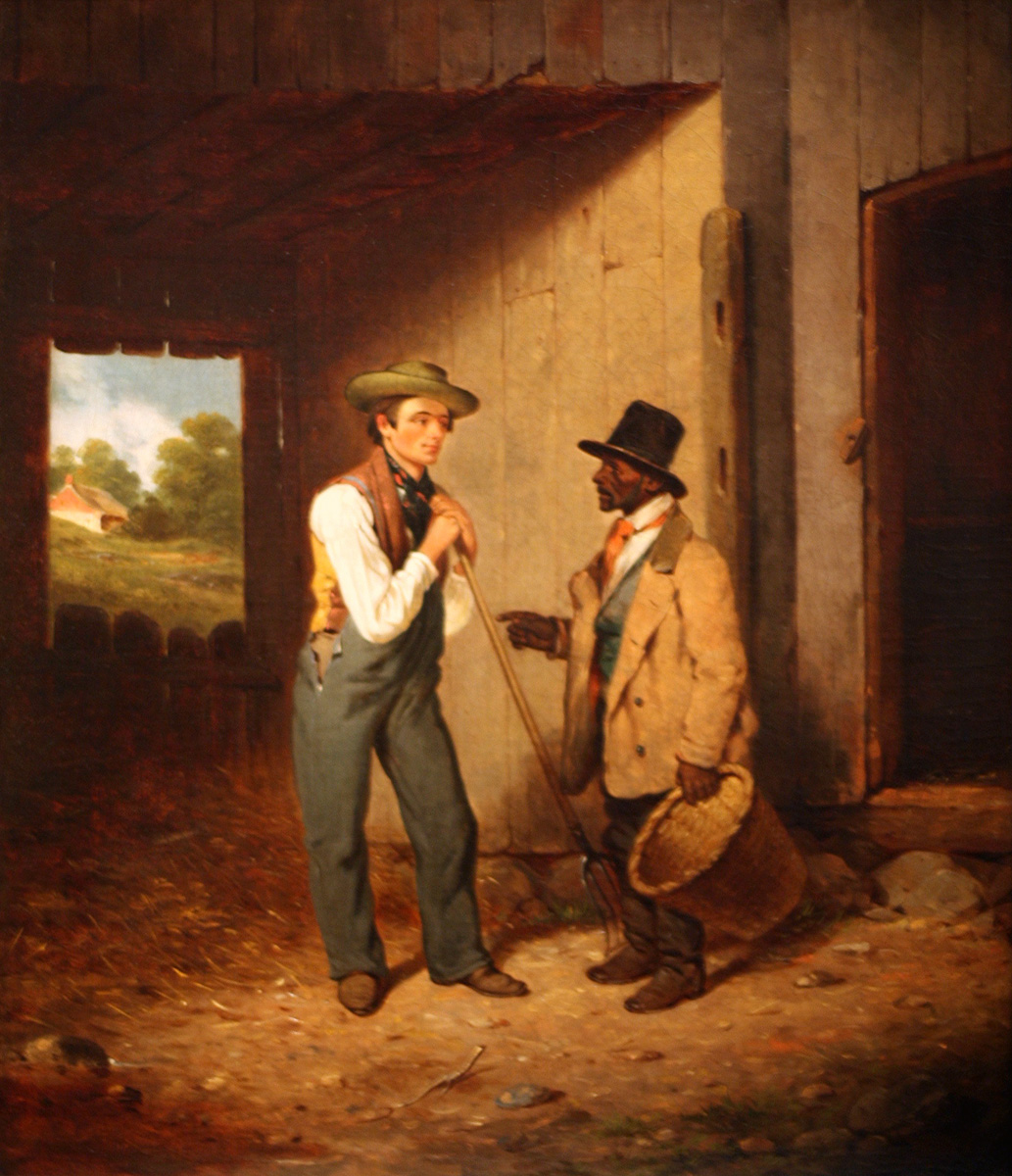
All Talk and No Work by Francis William Edmonds, c. 1855

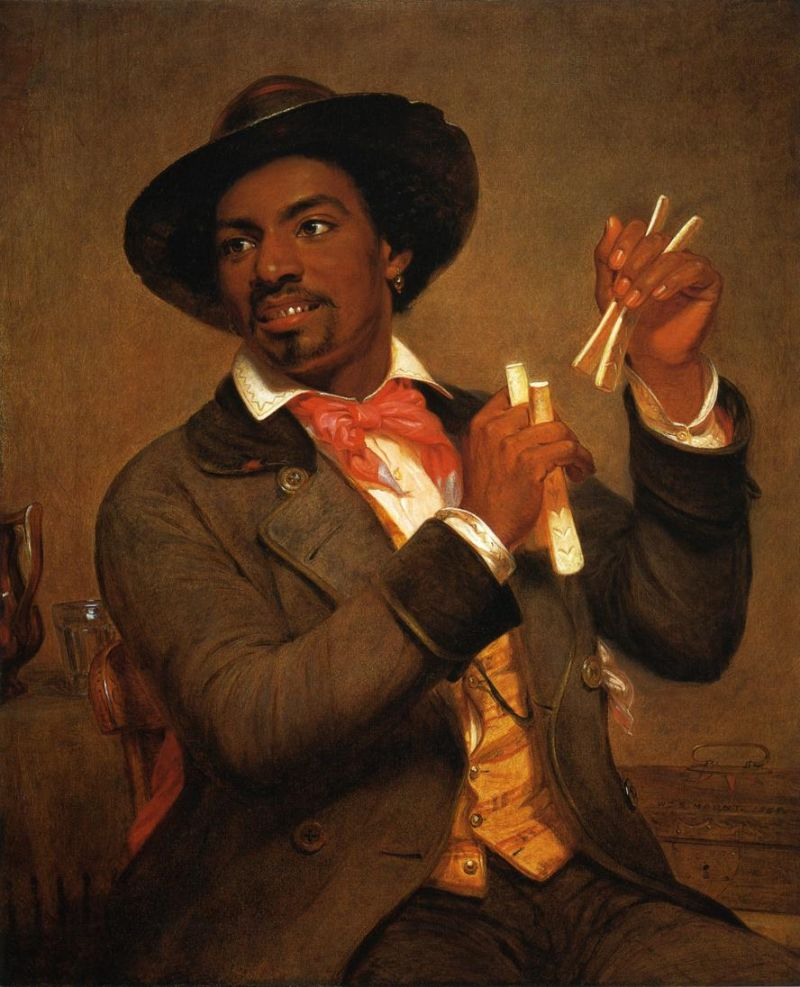
The Bone Player by William Sidney Mount, 1856

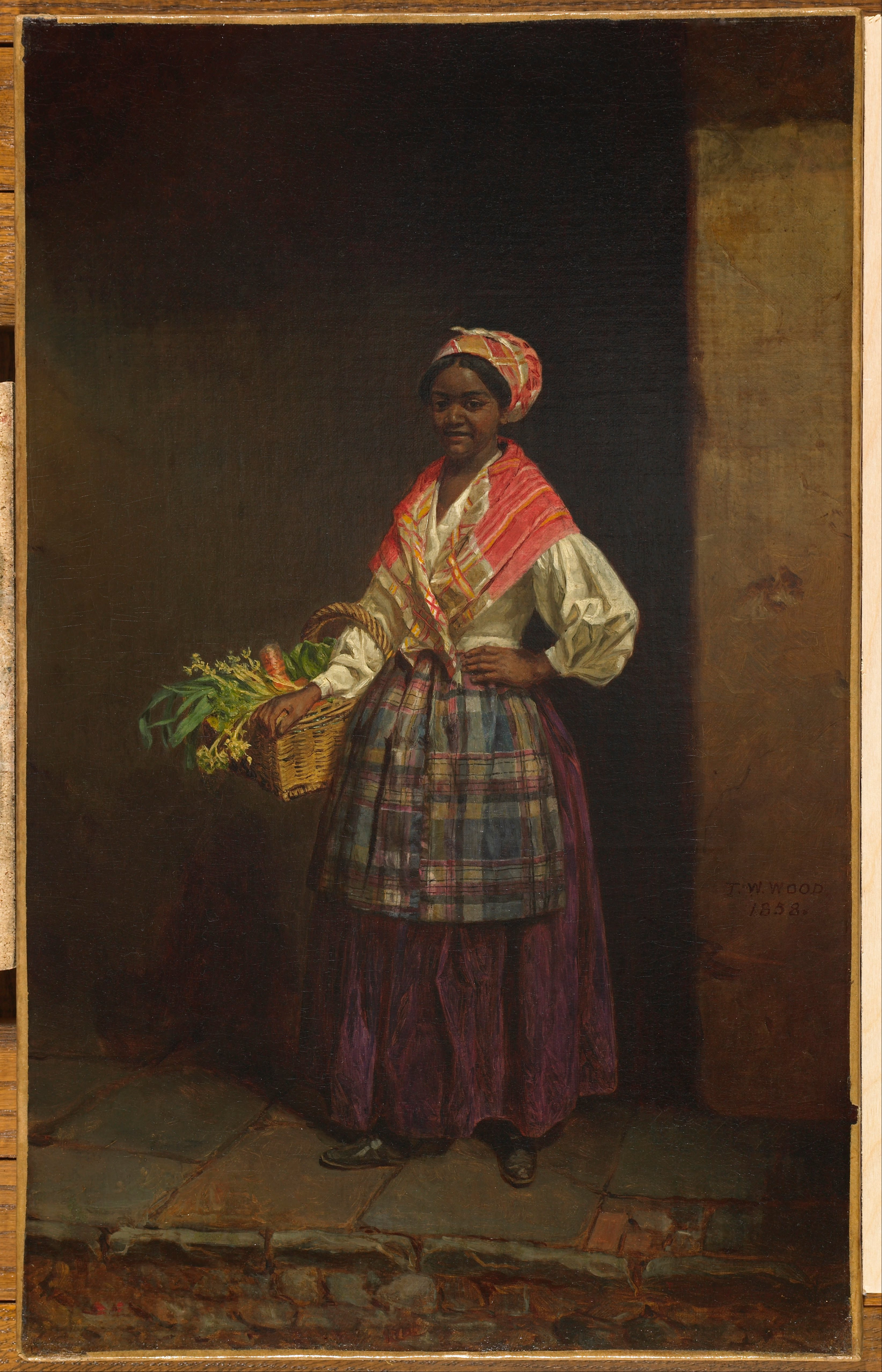
Market Woman by Thomas Waterman Wood, 1858

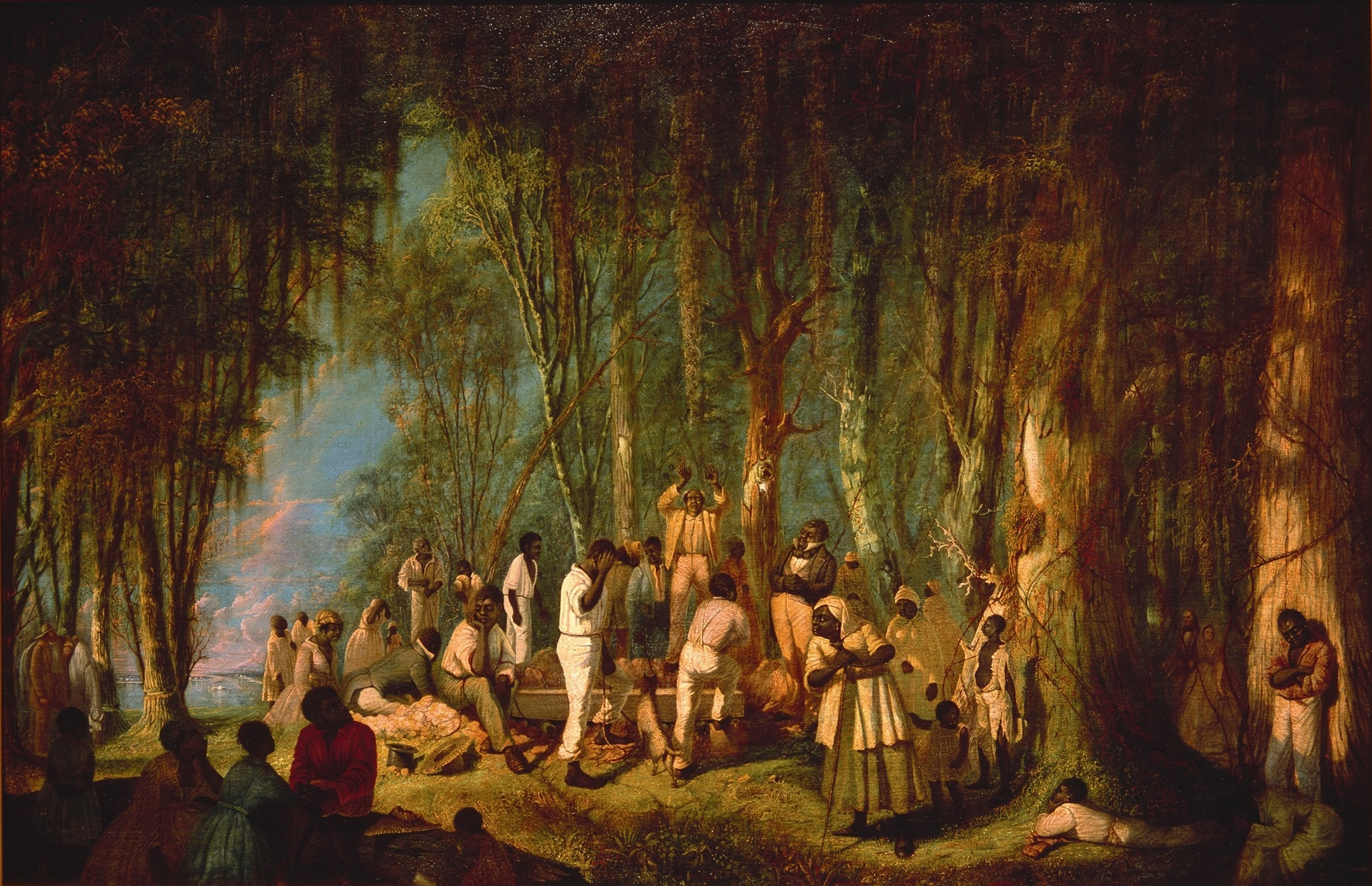
Plantation Burial by John Antrobus, 1860

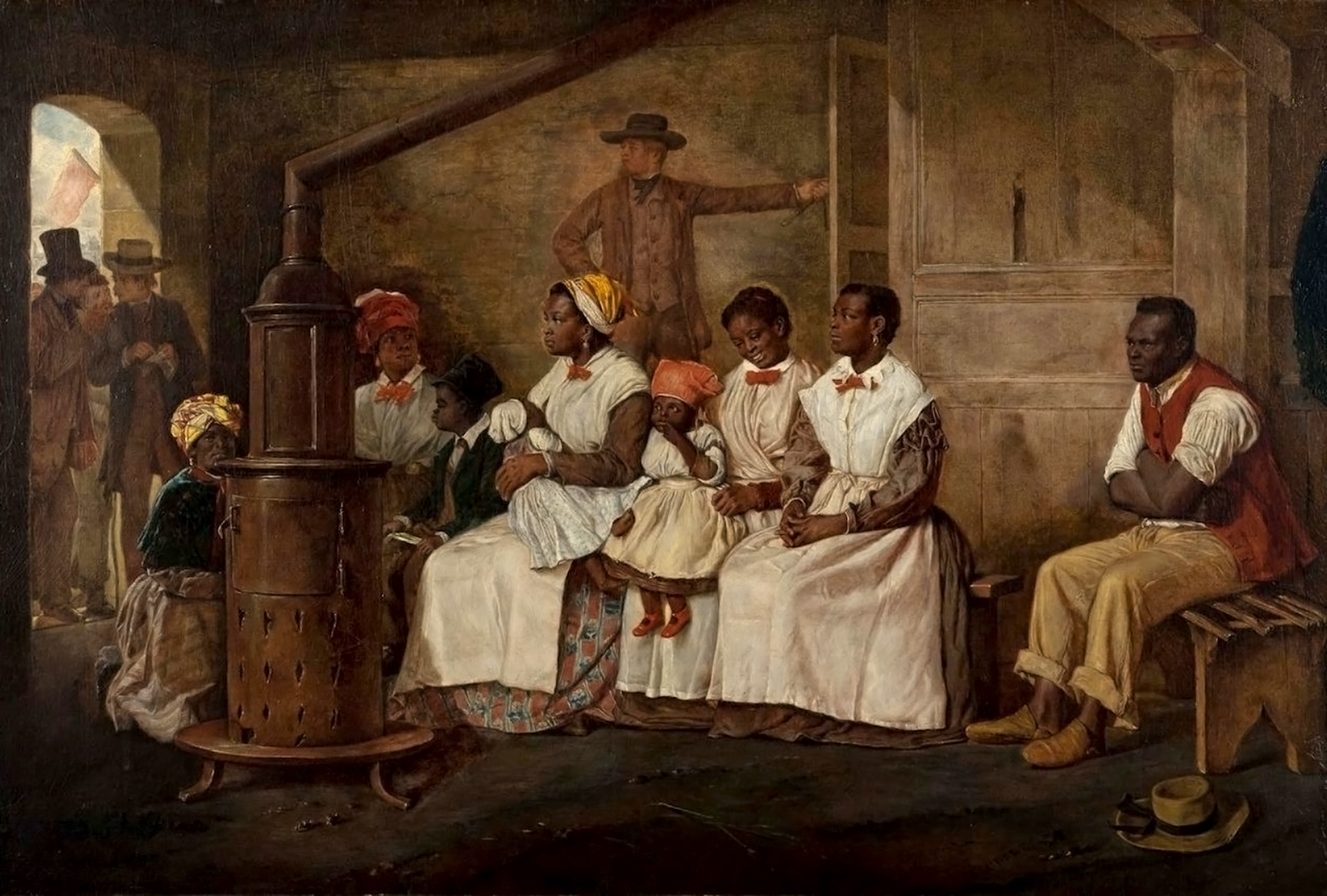
Slaves Waiting for Sale by Eyre Crowe, 1861

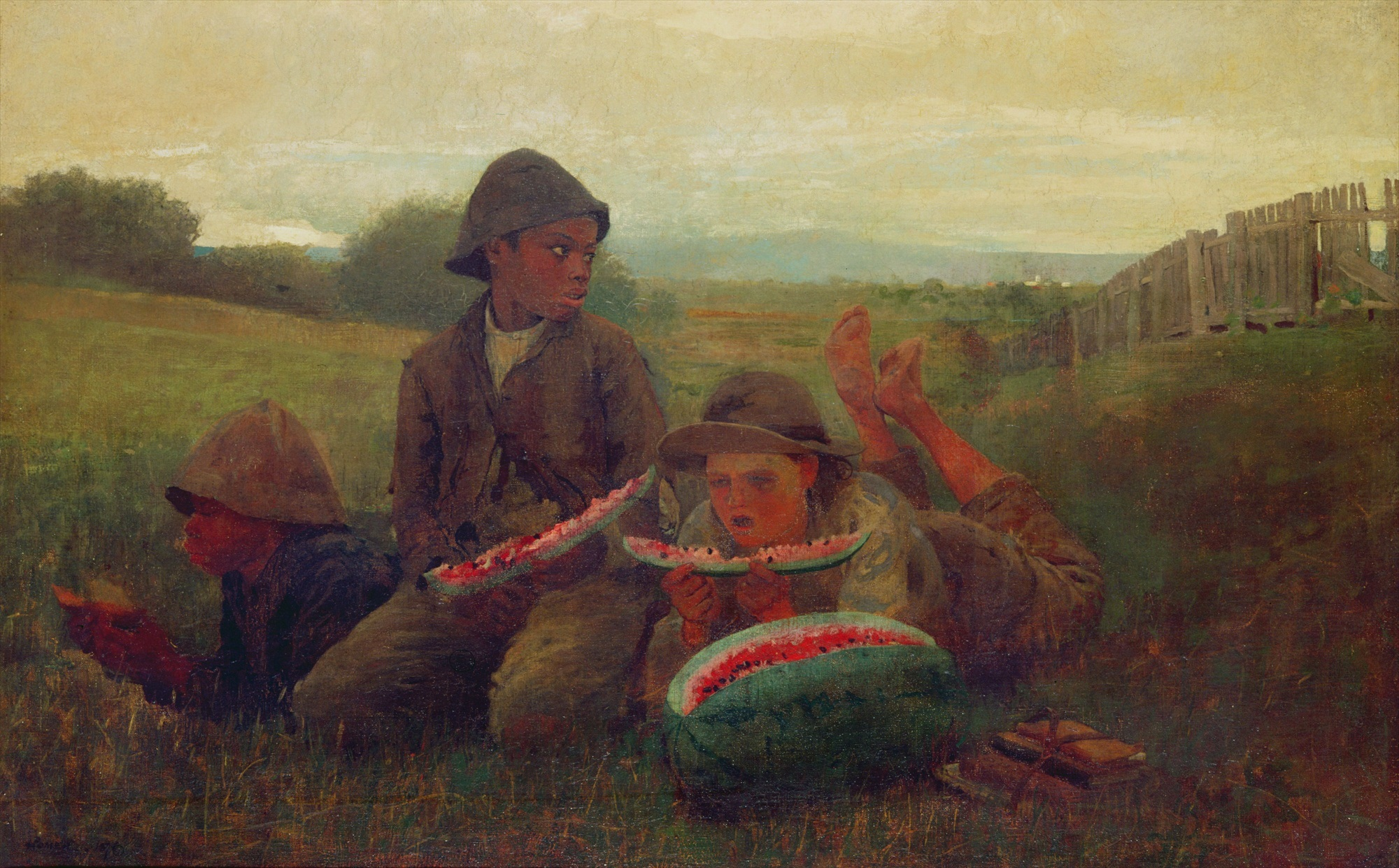
The Watermelon Boys by Winslow Homer, 1876

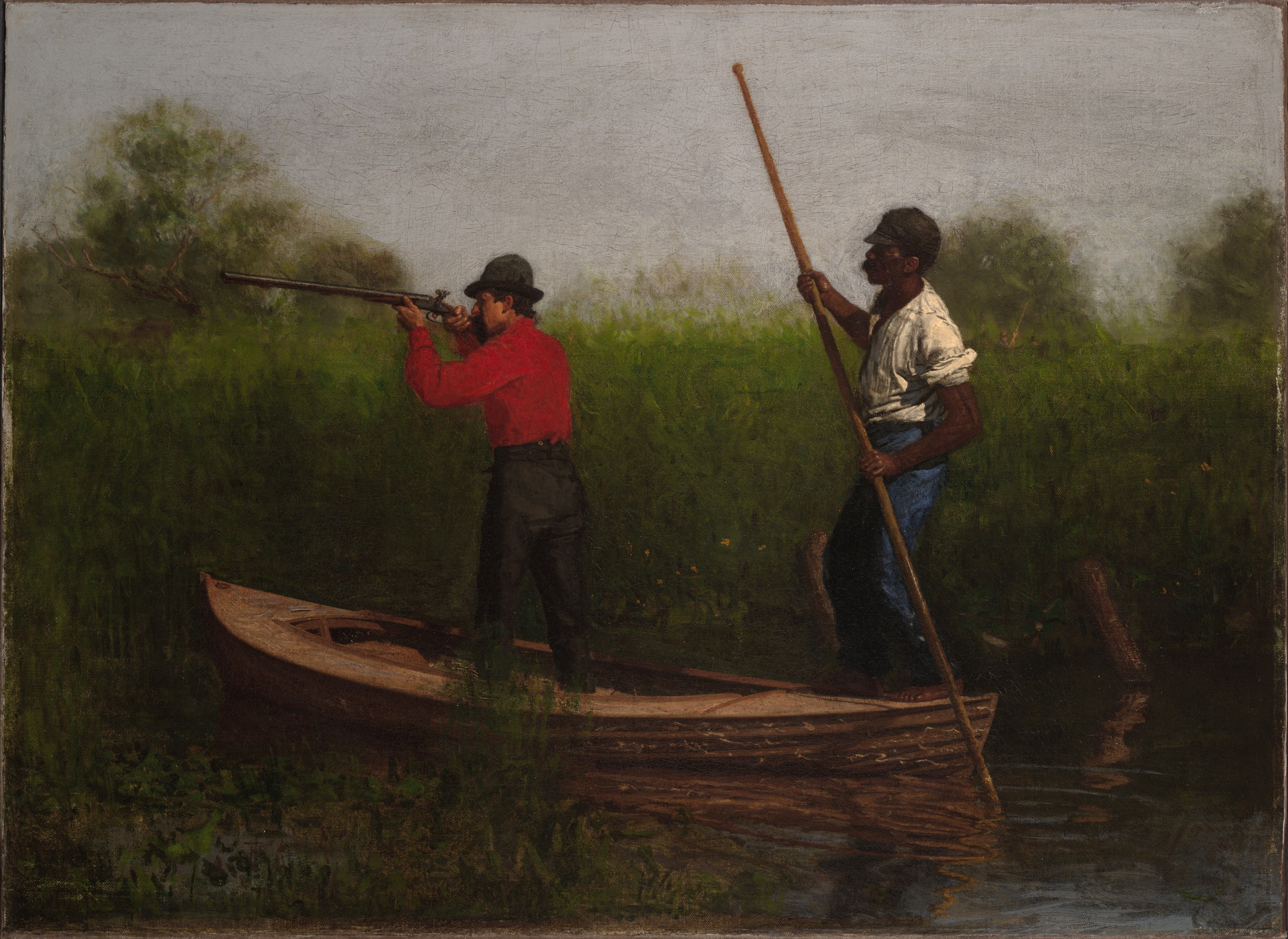
Rail Shooting by Thomas Eakins, 1876
