= Guy McElroy =

American art historian and curator (1946–1990)

- Born: Guy Clinton McElroy; 1946; Fairmont, West Virginia, United States
- Died: May 31, 1990 (aged 43–44); New York City, United States
- Occupations: Art historian Curator

Academic background
- Education: Fairmont State College; University of Cincinnati; Emerson College
- Thesis: Robert Duncanson: A Problem in Romantic Realism in American Art (1972)
- Academic advisor: Gabriel P. Weisberg

Academic work
- Discipline: Art history
- Sub-discipline: American art
- Notable works: Facing History: The Black Image in American Art, 1710-1940

Guy Clinton McElroy (1946 – May 31, 1990) was an African American art historian and curator. Most notably, McElroy curated the major exhibition titled Facing History: The Black Image in American Art, 1710-1940. He died during the run of the show in 1990.

== Early life and education ==
Born to George and Geraldine Woods, McElroy was born and raised in Fairmont, West Virginia. He earned a Bachelor of Arts from the local Fairmont State College in 1970. McElroy then received two Master of Arts degrees: one from the University of Cincinnati in art history in 1972, and another from Emerson College in communication in 1975. At Cincinnati, he wrote a master's thesis on the artist Robert S. Duncanson, supervised by Gabriel P. Weisberg. While at Emerson, he wrote a thesis on the Roxbury Conglomerate and had a stint as a Rockefeller Fellow in Museum Studies at the Fine Arts Museums of San Francisco. Between 1976 and 1980, he pursued a PhD in art history from the University of California, Berkeley, and transferred to the University of Maryland in 1983. McElroy did not complete his doctoral studies before his death in 1990.

== Later life and career ==
McElroy began his curatorial career in 1972 as assistant curator at the Utah Museum of Fine Arts, and then in the same position at the Museum of African American History in Boston, starting in 1974. Four years later, he became curator at the Mary McLeod Bethune Council House National Historic Site and became assistant director from 1982 to 1988. In 1986, he was also hired as adjunct curator at the Brooklyn Museum.

A year later, after an automobile accident in New Mexico, McElroy became a quadriplegic and began using a wheelchair. He continued to work the Brooklyn Museum until 1989 and organized an influential exhibition entitled Facing History: The Black Image in American Art, 1710–1940, which toured in 1990 at the Corcoran Gallery of Art and the Brooklyn Museum. Facing History was the first public exhibition and catalog by a major museum to showcase depictions of African Americans in American art. McElroy died as a result of pulmonary embolism while the exhibition was on view in Brooklyn. Before his death, he had been slated to become assistant professor of art history at the University of Maryland.

The New York Public Library holds an archive of McElroy's papers, dating from 1969 until his death.

== Works ==
- Black Women Visual Artists in Washington, D.C., Bethune Museum-Archives, 1986.
- African-American Artists, 1880-1987: Selections from the Evans-Tibbs Collection, with Richard J. Powell and Sharon F. Patton, University of Washington Press, 1989.
- Facing History: The Black Image in American Art, 1710-1940, Bedford Arts, 1990.

== See also ==
- List of Emerson College people
- List of gay, lesbian or bisexual people: M
- List of people with quadriplegia
- List of University of Cincinnati people
