= Crooksville High School =

Coordinates: 39°44′40″N 82°5′40″W

Location
- 4075 Ceramic Way; Crooksville, Ohio 43731

Information
- Type: Public
- School district: Crooksville Exempted Village School District
- Teaching staff: 14.90 (FTE)
- Enrollment: 306 (2023–2024)
- Student to teacher ratio: 20.54
- Color
- Team name: Ceramics
- Rival: Morgan High School New Lexington High School Philo High School
- Website: https://www.crooksville.org/crooksvillehighschool_home.aspx

Crooksville High School is a public high school in Crooksville, Ohio. It is the only high school in the Crooksville Exempted Village School District. Their nickname is the Ceramics. The high school was built in 1988. A new stadium was built in 2023 next to the schools' campus.

== Athletics ==
Crooksville participates in the Muskingum Valley League.

=== State Championships ===
- Boys Football – 1977

== Notable alumni ==
=== Faculty ===
- David "Tuffy" Knight, former coach in Canadian university football.
- Rich Newbrough, former coach in Canadian university football.
