= Luella Mundel =

Luella Raab Mundel (April 26, 1913 – March 22, 2004) was a former head of the art department of Fairmont State College in Fairmont, West Virginia who was known for her job termination and blacklisting due to questions about her beliefs during the McCarthy era.

== Biography ==
Born in Waterloo, Iowa, her father, Wilhelm Raab, was a potter from Austria, and her mother was from Germany. Mundel graduated from Waterloo High School in her hometown in 1932, and received a B.A. from the University of Northern Iowa. In 1938, she married Marvin Mundel, and the following year received a Ph.D. in art history and psychology from the University of Iowa. Her marriage ended in 1946.

== Documentary ==
Mundel was the subject of American Inquisition, a documentary by Helen Whitney. The documentary examines how McCarthyism had affected the small town of Fairmont, West Virginia.

In the documentary, the narrator said that in 1951 Mundel "was not a political activist, but had tastes, convictions about art, about religion, unfamiliar to these streets. And at a local American Legion seminar about subversives, Mundel stood to challenge what was being preached there. Her contract was dropped by the college. A state education official accused her of being a poor security risk. She then sued for slander, but in the trial that followed in Fairmont's courtroom, it was Luella Mundel and her right to speak freely, to be different, that wound up being tried."

== Quotes about the Mundel affair ==
- "Fairmont State College art professor Luella Mundel fell victim to this anti-communism frenzy. In 1951, Mundel publicly challenged an American Legion assertion that colleges were havens for communists. Weeks later, Thelma Loudin, a member of the state school board from Fairmont, called Mundel a 'poor security risk' and the board refused to renew her contract. Mundel unsuccessfully sued Loudin for slander. The potential cost of being labeled a communist was so great that Loudin's lawyer, U.S. Senator Matthew M. Neely, a staunch defender of liberalism, denounced Mundel's political and religious beliefs during the trial to prove his patriotism". West Virginia State History Archive.

== Later life and death ==
Mundel later became head of the art department at Mayville State University in North Dakota, where she remained until her retirement in 1975. Following her retirement, she moved to Lompoc, California, where she remained active in the arts community for over twenty years. Mundel died at Lompoc Convalescent Care Center at the age of 90.

On July 9, 2006, the Santa Maria, California art gallery The Cypress Gallery honored Mundel in an art show.

Victor Lasky, a conservative journalist who rose to prominence during the McCarthy era, sued ABC over his depiction in the documentary. Lasky maintained that the documentary inaccurately reported that he had called Mundel a Communist. Lasky lost the case.

== See also ==
- Blacklisting
- Helen Whitney
- McCarthyism
- Victor Lasky
