= James Goodwyn Clonney =

American painter

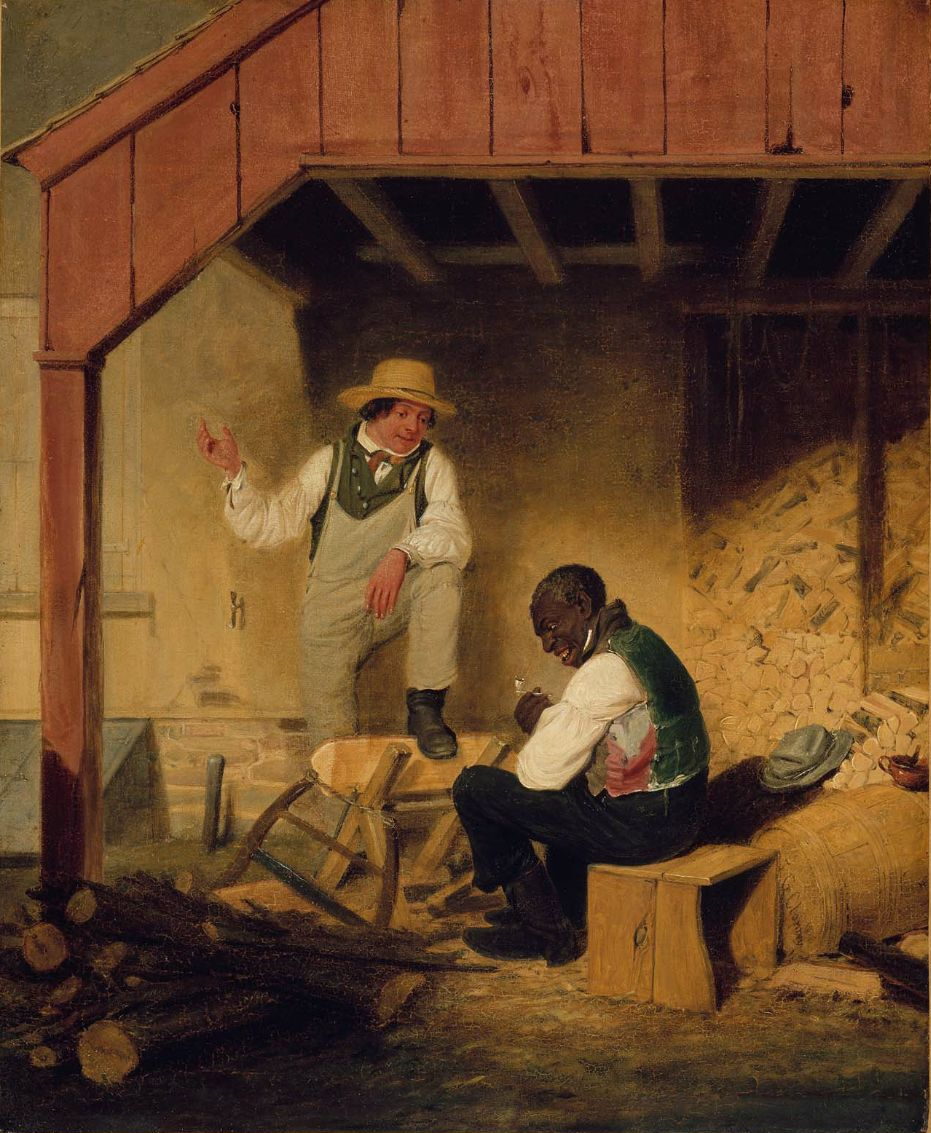
In the Woodshed (1838)

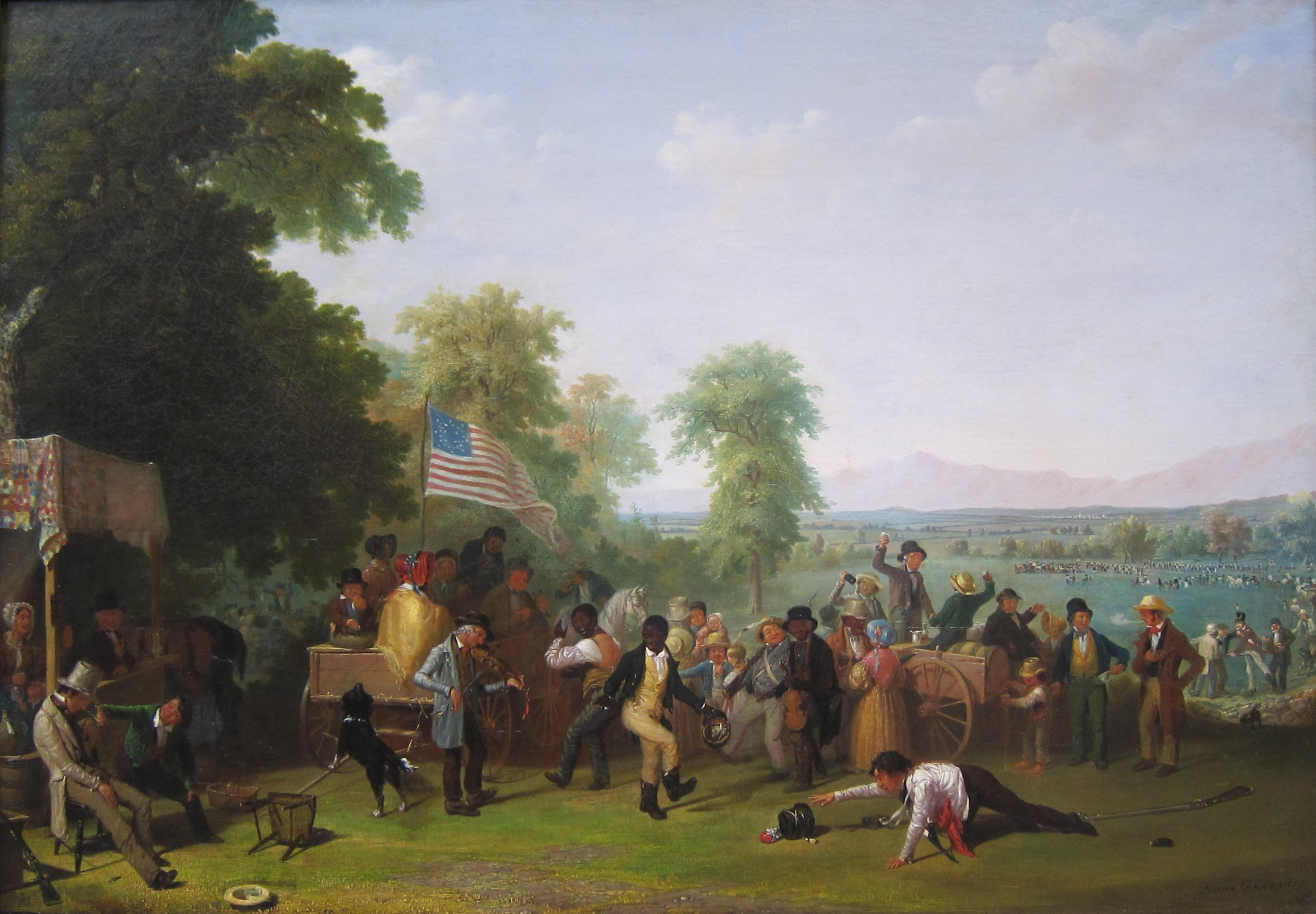
Militia Training (1841)

James Goodwyn Clonney (28 December 1812, Liverpool (?) – 7 October 1867, Binghamton, NY) was an English-born American genre painter and lithographer. Most of his works were rather small and many are miniatures. He focused on rural subjects. A number of his paintings are subtle political and social commentaries; notably those showing white and black men interacting as equals and friends.

== Biography ==
His birthplace is in doubt, but was most likely Liverpool. By 1830, he was in the United States working as a lithographer; in New York and Philadelphia. He is known to have been a student at the National Academy of Design in 1833, where he won several prizes. His early works display signs of classical, academic training and cover a wide variety of subjects. His later work shows the influence of William Sidney Mount.

After 1834, he was a member of the National Academy and exhibited there until 1852. He also exhibited at the Pennsylvania Academy of Fine Arts.

In 1836, he married Margaret Mesier, the daughter of a former employer, and became a naturalized citizen in 1840.

From that time, he focused on genre paintings, which were then just becoming popular. His first major work was originally called the "Fourth of July", but the title was changed to "Militia Training" after complaints that it depicted drunkenness and was not sufficiently dignified.

He also exhibited regularly in New York, although he did not participate in the art community there; favoring smaller cities as his residence. This included Cooperstown (1852), Peekskill, and New Rochelle. His final home was in Binghamton, where he died.
