= Tuffy Knight =

Canadian football coach (born 1936)

Profile
- Position: Head coach

Personal information
- Born: May 17, 1936 (age 90); Clarksburg, West Virginia, U.S.

Career history

Coaching
- 1966–1983: Waterloo Lutheran/Wilfrid Laurier University
- 1988–1997: University of Waterloo

Operations
- 1984–1988: Toronto Argonauts
- Canadian Football Hall of Fame (Class of 2007)

David "Tuffy" Knight (born May 17, 1936) is a former coach of Canadian university football and a member of the Canadian Football Hall of Fame.

Knight was a football, track, and basketball coach at Crooksville High School in Crooksville, Ohio who moved to Canada in 1965 to become athletic director and head men's basketball coach of the Waterloo Lutheran (later Wilfrid Laurier) Golden Hawks in Waterloo, Ontario. In 1966, he stepped down as basketball coach and replaced Bob Celeri as head football coach. He led the Hawks to five Ontario Championships and three Vanier Cup appearances. In 1983, Knight joined the Toronto Argonauts as director of player personnel. In 1988, he returned to Waterloo to coach Laurier's cross-town rivals at the University of Waterloo. At the time, the Waterloo Warriors hadn't won a game since 1985. He missed the entire 1988 season after suffering a mild heart attack, and the Warriors had an 0-7 season in his absence. Knight came back to be Canadian university football coach of the year in 1989. He coached the Warriors to the Yates Cup provincial title in 1997 and then retired. Knight came out of retirement in 2000 to be an assistant coach for the Golden Hawks, working three seasons under head coach Rick Zmich.

Knight won four Yates Cups over his career as head coach (1972, 1973, 1978, 1997). At the time of his retirement, he was the winningest coach in Canadian university football history with 153 career wins (record surpassed in 2003). He was a three-time winner of the Frank Tindall Trophy as the top university football coach in Canada. Knight was inducted into the Canadian Football Hall of Fame in 2007.

In 2006 he came out of retirement again to coach football at the high school level. He coached the Phoenix of Resurrection Catholic Secondary School (Kitchener, Ontario). Under his coaching, the Phoenix won the following titles:

- WCSSAA Division B Champions 2006
- WCSSAA Division B Champions 2007
- WCSSAA Division A Champions 2008
- CWOSSA AAA/AAAA Champions 2008
- OFSAA (Western Bowl) Champions 2008

== See also ==
- List of University of Waterloo people
