= Fairmont State University =

Public university in Fairmont, West Virginia, US

Coordinates: 39.485798°N 80.163019°W

- Former names: West Virginia Normal School at Fairmont (1865–1867); Fairmont State Normal School (1867–1931); Fairmont State Teachers College (1931–1944); Fairmont State College (1944–2004)
- Motto: "Scholarship, Opportunity, Achievement, Responsibility"
- Type: Public university
- Established: February 27, 1865; 161 years ago
- Accreditation: HLC
- Academic affiliations: WVHEPC
- Endowment: $38 million (2025)
- President: Mike Davis
- Faculty: 597
- Administrative staff: 450
- Students: 3,421 (fall 2025)
- Undergraduates: 3,174 (fall 2025)
- Postgraduates: 247 (fall 2025)
- Location: Fairmont, West Virginia, United States
- Campus: 120 acres (0.49 km^{2}); Distant town
- Other campuses: Bridgeport; Clarksburg
- Newspaper: The Columns
- Colors: Maroon and white
- Nickname: Falcons
- Sporting affiliations: NCAA Division II – MEC
- Mascot: Freddie
- Website: fairmontstate.edu

Fairmont State University is a public university in Fairmont, West Virginia, United States.

== History ==
Fairmont State University's roots reach back to the formation of public education in the state of West Virginia. The first private normal school in West Virginia was established to train teachers in Fairmont in 1865 by John N. Boyd, the school's first principal. It was known as the West Virginia Normal School at Fairmont.

On February 27, 1867, it was purchased by the State from the Regency of the West Virginia Normal School (formed as a joint stock company in 1866) and became a branch of the State Normal School of Marshall College. From 1867 to 1892 the school was known variously as Fairmont Normal School, the Fairmont Branch of the West Virginia Normal School, the Branch of the West Virginia Normal School at Fairmont, a branch of the West Virginia State Normal School of Marshall College, but most commonly as Fairmont State Normal School (FSNS). By 1892 the designation of "branch" had fallen into disuse.

In 1893, the school moved into a new building at Second Street and Fairmont Avenue and, in 1917, to its current location in the building now known as Hardway Hall, in honor of former president Wendell G. Hardway, which sits on a hill overlooking Locust Avenue.

Hardway Hall, originally known as Fairmont Normal School Administration Building, was listed on the National Register of Historic Places in 1994.

In 1923, Fairmont State Normal School first offered a four-year bachelor's degree program in education, making the school a college. It was renamed Fairmont State Teachers College in 1931 and Fairmont State College in 1943. On April 7, 2004, Governor Bob Wise signed legislation changing its name to Fairmont State University.

Fairmont State offers more than 80 baccalaureate degrees in business, computer science, education, engineering and technology, fine arts, liberal arts, national security and intelligence, political science, mathematics, and nursing and allied health administration with graduate programs in architecture, education, teaching, business, and criminal justice.

== Community and technical college ==
Undergraduate demographics as of Fall 2023
Race and ethnicity	Total
White	87%
Black	5%
Two or more races	5%
Hispanic	1%
Unknown	1%
Economic diversity
Low-income (Note: The percentage of students who received an income-based federal Pell grant intended for low-income students.)	39%
Affluent (Note: The percentage of students who are a part of the American middle class at the bare minimum.)	61%

In 1974, a community college component was founded. This became independently accredited as Fairmont State Community and Technical College in 2003. In 2006, Fairmont State was given direction by the State of West Virginia to split with the community and technical college, which then became known as Pierpont Community and Technical College. For some time both institutions still operated on the Fairmont campus, but since 2008, they are recognized as independent institutions and offer completely separate degree programs; Pierpont focuses more on technical associate's programs, while Fairmont State's main focus is on baccalaureate degrees and master's programs.

After a March 2021 Memorandum of Understanding, the two schools became independent of one another whereby Pierpont transitioned off of the Fairmont campus into a new building near the NASA complex in South Fairmont,

== Athletics ==
Fairmont State's athletic teams, known as the Falcons (alternately as Fighting Falcons, or Lady Falcons for women's teams), compete in the Mountain East Conference (MEC) in National Collegiate Athletic Association (NCAA) Division II and field teams in 17 sports including football, men's and women's basketball, wrestling, women's soccer, women's volleyball, men's and women's golf, acrobatics and tumbling, baseball, softball, men's and women's swimming, men's and women's tennis, and men's and women's cross country.

The Fighting Falcons football team finished the 2016 season with a 10–2 record, clinching an NCAA playoff berth. In 2017, they finished the season 8–3 and 2nd in the MEC.

In 2017, the men's basketball team was ranked #3 in the final NABC Coaches Poll. In post-season play, the Falcons captured the NCAA Atlantic Region title and earned the top seed in the NCAA Elite Eight tournament eventually losing to Northwest Missouri State in the tournament final on March 25, 2017 by a score of 71–61.

== The National Security Lab ==
The Open Source Intelligence Exchange (OSIX) organization was created in 2012 and serves as Fairmont State's applied research lab under the National Security and Intelligence program. OSIX uses open source and social media intelligence to determine real-world active threats. Professor David Abruzzino, who came to Fairmont State after retiring from work with the CIA, was the OSIX program director and faculty mentor from 2010 until 2017.

== See also ==
- Luella Mundel
