= Political party strength in West Virginia =

Politics in the US state of West Virginia

Party registration by county as of June 30, 2026: Republican: 30–40% 40–50% 50–60% 60–70% 70–80% / Democratic: 30–40% 40–50%

The following tables indicate the historic party affiliation of elected officials in the U.S. state of West Virginia, including: governor, secretary of state, attorney general, state auditor, state treasurer, and state agriculture commissioner. The tables also indicate the historical party composition in the state Senate, state House of Delegates, Supreme Court of Appeals, delegation to the U.S. Senate, and the delegation to the U.S. House of Representatives. For years in which a presidential election was held, the tables indicate which party's nominees received the state's electoral votes.

== 1863–1949 ==
Year	Executive offices					State Legislature		Supreme Court of Appeals	United States Congress			Electoral votes
Year	Governor	Secretary of State	Attorney General	Auditor	Treasurer	State Senate	State House	Supreme Court of Appeals	U.S. Senator (Class I)	U.S. Senator (Class II)	U.S. House	Electoral votes
1863	Arthur I. Boreman (R) (Note: Resigned to run for the United States Senate, winning election.)	Jacob Edgar Boyers (R)	Aquilla B. Caldwell (R)	Samuel Crane (R)	Campbell Tarr (R)	20UU	52UU	3R	Peter G. Van Winkle (UU)	Waitman T. Willey (UU)	3UU	
1864	Arthur I. Boreman (R)	Jacob Edgar Boyers (R)	Aquilla B. Caldwell (R)	Samuel Crane (R)	Campbell Tarr (R)	20UU	52UU	3R	Peter G. Van Winkle (UU)	Waitman T. Willey (UU)	3UU	Lincoln/ Johnson (NU) ✓
1865	Arthur I. Boreman (R)	Granville D. Hall (R)	Ephraim B. Hall (R)	Joseph Marcellus; McWhorter (R)	Campbell Tarr (R)	20UU	52UU	3R	Peter G. Van Winkle (UU)	Waitman T. Willey (R)	2UU, 1R	Lincoln/ Johnson (NU) ✓
1866	Arthur I. Boreman (R)	Granville D. Hall (R)	Edwin Maxwell (R)	Joseph Marcellus; McWhorter (R)	Campbell Tarr (R)	19R, 1D	48R, 8D	3R	Peter G. Van Winkle (UU)	Waitman T. Willey (R)	2UU, 1R	Lincoln/ Johnson (NU) ✓
1867	Arthur I. Boreman (R)	John Witcher (R)	Thayer Melvin (R)	Joseph Marcellus; McWhorter (R)	Jacob H. Brister (R)	19R, 3D	41R, 15D	3R	Peter G. Van Winkle (R)	Waitman T. Willey (R)	3R	Lincoln/ Johnson (NU) ✓
1868	Arthur I. Boreman (R)	John Witcher (R)	Thayer Melvin (R)	Joseph Marcellus; McWhorter (R)	Jacob H. Brister (R)	20R, 2D	42R, 14D	3R	Peter G. Van Winkle (R)	Waitman T. Willey (R)	3R	Grant/ Colfax (R) ✓
1869	Daniel D. T. Farnsworth (R) (Note: As president of the state Senate, filled unexpired term for 7 days.)	James Pipes (R)	Aquilla B. Caldwell (R) (Note: Appointed.)	Thomas Boggess (R)	James A. Macauley (R)	18R, 4D	32R, 24D	3R	Arthur I. Boreman (R)	Waitman T. Willey (R)	3R	Grant/ Colfax (R) ✓
1870	William E. Stevenson (R)	James Pipes (R)	Aquilla B. Caldwell (R)	Thomas Boggess (R)	James A. Macauley (R)	13LR, 5D, 4R	33R, 23D	3R	Arthur I. Boreman (R)	Waitman T. Willey (R)	3R	Grant/ Colfax (R) ✓
1871	John J. Jacob (D)	John M. Phelps (R)	Joseph Sprigg (D)	Edward A. Bennett (D)	John S. Burdett (D)	12D, 10R	40D, 16R	2R, 1D	Arthur I. Boreman (R)	Henry G. Davis (D)	2D, 1R	Grant/ Colfax (R) ✓
1872	John J. Jacob (D)	John M. Phelps (R)	Joseph Sprigg (D)	Edward A. Bennett (D)	John S. Burdett (D)	18D, 4R	39D, 16R, 1?	2R, 1D	Arthur I. Boreman (R)	Henry G. Davis (D)	2D, 1R	Grant/ Wilson (R) ✓
1873	John J. Jacob (I)	Charles Hedrick (D)	Henry M. Mathews (D)	Edward A. Bennett (D)	John S. Burdett (D)	21D, 3R	43D, 19R, 3?	4D	Arthur I. Boreman (R)	Henry G. Davis (D)	2D, 1R	Grant/ Wilson (R) ✓
1874	John J. Jacob (I)	Charles Hedrick (D)	Henry M. Mathews (D)	Edward A. Bennett (D)	John S. Burdett (D)	21D, 3R	43D, 19R, 3?	4D	Arthur I. Boreman (R)	Henry G. Davis (D)	2D, 1R	Grant/ Wilson (R) ✓
1875	John J. Jacob (I)	Charles Hedrick (D)	Henry M. Mathews (D)	Edward A. Bennett (D)	John S. Burdett (D)	19D, 4R, 1I	49D, 12R, 4I	4D	Allen T. Caperton (D)	Henry G. Davis (D)	3D	Grant/ Wilson (R) ✓
1876	John J. Jacob (I)	Charles Hedrick (D)	Henry M. Mathews (D)	Edward A. Bennett (D)	Sobieski Brady (D)	19D, 4R, 1I	49D, 12R, 4I	4D	Samuel Price (D)	Henry G. Davis (D)	3D	Tilden/ Hendricks (D) ✗
1877	Henry M. Mathews (D)	Sobieski Brady (D)	Robert White (D)	Joseph S. Miller (D)	Thomas J. West (D)	19D, 5R	46D, 19R	4D	Frank Hereford (D)	Henry G. Davis (D)	3D	Tilden/ Hendricks (D) ✗
1878	Henry M. Mathews (D)	Sobieski Brady (D)	Robert White (D)	Joseph S. Miller (D)	Thomas J. West (D)	19D, 5R	46D, 19R	4D	Frank Hereford (D)	Henry G. Davis (D)	3D	Tilden/ Hendricks (D) ✗
1879	Henry M. Mathews (D)	Sobieski Brady (D)	Robert White (D)	Joseph S. Miller (D)	Thomas J. West (D)	21D, 2R, 1GB	40D, 17GB, 8R	4D	Frank Hereford (D)	Henry G. Davis (D)	3D	Tilden/ Hendricks (D) ✗
1880	Henry M. Mathews (D)	Sobieski Brady (D)	Robert White (D)	Joseph S. Miller (D)	Thomas J. West (D)	21D, 2R, 1GB	40D, 17GB, 8R	4D	Frank Hereford (D)	Henry G. Davis (D)	3D	Hancock/ English (D) ✗
1881	Jacob B. Jackson (D)	Randolph Stalnaker (D)	Cornelius Clarkson; Watts (D)	Joseph S. Miller (D)	Thomas O'Brien (D)	20D, 3R, 1GB	46D, 17R, 2GB	4D	Johnson N. Camden (D)	Henry G. Davis (D)	3D	Hancock/ English (D) ✗
1882	Jacob B. Jackson (D)	Randolph Stalnaker (D)	Cornelius Clarkson; Watts (D)	Joseph S. Miller (D)	Thomas O'Brien (D)	20D, 3R, 1GB	46D, 17R, 2GB	4D	Johnson N. Camden (D)	Henry G. Davis (D)	3D	Hancock/ English (D) ✗
1883	Jacob B. Jackson (D)	Randolph Stalnaker (D)	Cornelius Clarkson; Watts (D)	Joseph S. Miller (D)	Thomas O'Brien (D)	17D, 8R, 1GB	38D, 27R	4D	Johnson N. Camden (D)	John E. Kenna (D)	3D, 1R	Hancock/ English (D) ✗
1884	Jacob B. Jackson (D)	Randolph Stalnaker (D)	Cornelius Clarkson; Watts (D)	Joseph S. Miller (D)	Thomas O'Brien (D)	17D, 8R, 1GB	38D, 27R	4D	Johnson N. Camden (D)	John E. Kenna (D)	3D, 1R	Cleveland/ Hendricks (D) ✓
1885	Emanuel Willis Wilson (D) (Note: Did not run for re-election in 1888, but due to the election's being disputed, remained in office until the investigation was complete.)	Henry S. Walker (D)	Alfred Caldwell (D)	Patrick Fee Duffy (D)	William T. Thompson (D)	15D, 11R	37D, 28R	4D	Johnson N. Camden (D)	John E. Kenna (D)	3D, 1R	Cleveland/ Hendricks (D) ✓
1886	Emanuel Willis Wilson (D)	Henry S. Walker (D)	Alfred Caldwell (D)	Patrick Fee Duffy (D)	William T. Thompson (D)	15D, 11R	37D, 28R	4D	Johnson N. Camden (D)	John E. Kenna (D)	3D, 1R	Cleveland/ Hendricks (D) ✓
1887	Emanuel Willis Wilson (D)	Henry S. Walker (D)	Alfred Caldwell (D)	Patrick Fee Duffy (D)	William T. Thompson (D)	14D, 12R	36D, 29R	4D	Charles James Faulkner (D)	John E. Kenna (D)	3D, 1R	Cleveland/ Hendricks (D) ✓
1888	Emanuel Willis Wilson (D)	Henry S. Walker (D)	Alfred Caldwell (D)	Patrick Fee Duffy (D)	William T. Thompson (D)	14D, 12R	36D, 29R	4D	Charles James Faulkner (D)	John E. Kenna (D)	3D, 1R	Cleveland/ Thurman (D) ✗
1889	Emanuel Willis Wilson (D)	Henry S. Walker (D)	Alfred Caldwell (D)	Patrick Fee Duffy (D)	William T. Thompson (D)	12D, 13R, 1UL (Note: The Union Labor candidate supported a Democratic Senate Presidency.)	34D, 31R	4D	Charles James Faulkner (D)	John E. Kenna (D)	2D, 2R	Cleveland/ Thurman (D) ✗
1890	Aretas B. Fleming (D)	William A. Ohley (D) (Note: Elected to fill unexpired term.)	Alfred Caldwell (D)	Patrick Fee Duffy (D)	William T. Thompson (D)	12D, 13R, 1UL	34D, 31R	4D	Charles James Faulkner (D)	John E. Kenna (D)	2D, 2R	Cleveland/ Thurman (D) ✗
1891	Aretas B. Fleming (D)	William A. Ohley (D)	Alfred Caldwell (D)	Patrick Fee Duffy (D)	William T. Thompson (D)	16D, 10R	44D, 21R	4D	Charles James Faulkner (D)	John E. Kenna (D)	4D	Cleveland/ Thurman (D) ✗
1892	Aretas B. Fleming (D)	William A. Ohley (D)	Alfred Caldwell (D)	Patrick Fee Duffy (D)	William T. Thompson (D)	16D, 10R	44D, 21R	4D	Charles James Faulkner (D)	John E. Kenna (D)	4D	Cleveland/ Stevenson (D) ✓
1893	William A. MacCorkle (D)	William E. Chilton (D)	Thomas S. Riley (D)	Isaac V. Johnson (D)	John M. Rowan (D)	21D, 5R	41D, 30R	4D	Charles James Faulkner (D)	Johnson N. Camden (D)	4D	Cleveland/ Stevenson (D) ✓
1894	William A. MacCorkle (D)	William E. Chilton (D)	Thomas S. Riley (D)	Isaac V. Johnson (D)	John M. Rowan (D)	21D, 5R	41D, 30R	4D	Charles James Faulkner (D)	Johnson N. Camden (D)	4D	Cleveland/ Stevenson (D) ✓
1895	William A. MacCorkle (D)	William E. Chilton (D)	Thomas S. Riley (D)	Isaac V. Johnson (D)	John M. Rowan (D)	14R, 12D	49R, 22D	4D	Charles James Faulkner (D)	Stephen B. Elkins (R)	4R	Cleveland/ Stevenson (D) ✓
1896	William A. MacCorkle (D)	William E. Chilton (D)	Thomas S. Riley (D)	Isaac V. Johnson (D)	John M. Rowan (D)	14R, 12D	49R, 22D	4D	Charles James Faulkner (D)	Stephen B. Elkins (R)	4R	McKinley/ Hobart (R) ✓
1897	George W. Atkinson (R)	William M. O. Dawson (R)	Edgar P. Rucker (R)	Latelle M. LaFollette Sr. (R)	M. A. Kendall (R)	20R, 5D, 1Pop	40R, 31D	3D, 1R	Charles James Faulkner (D)	Stephen B. Elkins (R)	3R, 1D	McKinley/ Hobart (R) ✓
1898	George W. Atkinson (R)	William M. O. Dawson (R)	Edgar P. Rucker (R)	Latelle M. LaFollette Sr. (R)	M. A. Kendall (R)	20R, 5D, 1Pop	40R, 31D	3D, 1R	Charles James Faulkner (D)	Stephen B. Elkins (R)	3R, 1D	McKinley/ Hobart (R) ✓
1899	George W. Atkinson (R)	William M. O. Dawson (R)	Edgar P. Rucker (R)	Latelle M. LaFollette Sr. (R)	M. A. Kendall (R)	17R, 9D	37D, 33R, 1?	3D, 1R	Nathan B. Scott (R)	Stephen B. Elkins (R)	4R	McKinley/ Hobart (R) ✓
1900	George W. Atkinson (R)	William M. O. Dawson (R)	Edgar P. Rucker (R)	Latelle M. LaFollette Sr. (R)	M. A. Kendall (R)	17R, 9D	37D, 33R, 1?	3D, 1R	Nathan B. Scott (R)	Stephen B. Elkins (R)	4R	McKinley/ Roosevelt (R) ✓
1901	Albert B. White (R)	William M. O. Dawson (R)	Romeo H. Freer (R)	Arnold C. Scherr (R)	Peter Silman (R)	18R, 8D	45R, 26D	3R, 1D	Nathan B. Scott (R)	Stephen B. Elkins (R)	4R	McKinley/ Roosevelt (R) ✓
1902	Albert B. White (R)	William M. O. Dawson (R)	Romeo H. Freer (R)	Arnold C. Scherr (R)	Peter Silman (R)	18R, 8D	45R, 26D	3R, 1D	Nathan B. Scott (R)	Stephen B. Elkins (R)	4R	McKinley/ Roosevelt (R) ✓
1903	Albert B. White (R)	William M. O. Dawson (R)	Romeo H. Freer (R)	Arnold C. Scherr (R)	Peter Silman (R)	24R, 6D	57R, 29D	4R, 1D	Nathan B. Scott (R)	Stephen B. Elkins (R)	4R	McKinley/ Roosevelt (R) ✓
1904	Albert B. White (R)	William M. O. Dawson (R)	Romeo H. Freer (R)	Arnold C. Scherr (R)	Peter Silman (R)	24R, 6D	57R, 29D	4R, 1D	Nathan B. Scott (R)	Stephen B. Elkins (R)	4R	Roosevelt/ Fairbanks (R) ✓
1905	William M. O. Dawson (R)	Charles Wesley Swisher (R)	Clark W. May (R)	Arnold C. Scherr (R)	Newton Ogden (R)	25R, 5D	61R, 25D	5R	Nathan B. Scott (R)	Stephen B. Elkins (R)	3R, 1D	Roosevelt/ Fairbanks (R) ✓
1906	William M. O. Dawson (R)	Charles Wesley Swisher (R)	Clark W. May (R)	Arnold C. Scherr (R)	Newton Ogden (R)	25R, 5D	61R, 25D	5R	Nathan B. Scott (R)	Stephen B. Elkins (R)	3R, 1D	Roosevelt/ Fairbanks (R) ✓
1907	William M. O. Dawson (R)	Charles Wesley Swisher (R)	Clark W. May (R)	Arnold C. Scherr (R)	Newton Ogden (R)	25R, 5D	60R, 25D, 1Proh	5R	Nathan B. Scott (R)	Stephen B. Elkins (R)	5R	Roosevelt/ Fairbanks (R) ✓
1908	William M. O. Dawson (R)	Charles Wesley Swisher (R)	William G. Conley (R)	Arnold C. Scherr (R)	Newton Ogden (R)	25R, 5D	60R, 25D, 1Proh	5R	Nathan B. Scott (R)	Stephen B. Elkins (R)	5R	Taft/ Sherman (R) ✓
1909	William E. Glasscock (R)	Stuart F. Reed (R)	William G. Conley (R)	John S. Darst (R)	E. Leslie Long (R)	24R, 6D	60R, 26D	5R	Nathan B. Scott (R)	Stephen B. Elkins (R)	5R	Taft/ Sherman (R) ✓
1910	William E. Glasscock (R)	Stuart F. Reed (R)	William G. Conley (R)	John S. Darst (R)	E. Leslie Long (R)	24R, 6D	60R, 26D	5R	Nathan B. Scott (R)	Stephen B. Elkins (R)	5R	Taft/ Sherman (R) ✓
1911	William E. Glasscock (R)	Stuart F. Reed (R)	William G. Conley (R)	John S. Darst (R)	E. Leslie Long (R)	15R, 15D (Note: During the 1911-12 sessions, Republicans held the Senate Presidency under Henry D. Hatfield while each party controlled half the committees; During the 1913-14 sessions, Democrats held the Senate Presidency under Samuel V. Woods, while Republicans were able to select their choice of Sergeant-at-Arms and Clerk and control of all committees.)	63D, 23R	5R	William E. Chilton (D)	Davis Elkins (R)	4D, 1R	Taft/ Sherman (R) ✓
1911	William E. Glasscock (R)	Stuart F. Reed (R)	William G. Conley (R)	John S. Darst (R)	E. Leslie Long (R)	15R, 15D	63D, 23R	5R	William E. Chilton (D)	Clarence W. Watson (D)	4D, 1R	Taft/ Sherman (R) ✓
1912	William E. Glasscock (R)	Stuart F. Reed (R)	William G. Conley (R)	John S. Darst (R)	E. Leslie Long (R)	15R, 15D	63D, 23R	5R	William E. Chilton (D)	Clarence W. Watson (D)	4D, 1R	Wilson/ Marshall (D) ✓
1913	Henry D. Hatfield (R)	Stuart F. Reed (R)	Armistead Abraham Lilly (R)	John S. Darst (R)	E. Leslie Long (R)	15R, 15D	53R, 33D	5R	William E. Chilton (D)	Nathan Goff Jr. (R)	4R, 2D	Wilson/ Marshall (D) ✓
1914	Henry D. Hatfield (R)	Stuart F. Reed (R)	Armistead Abraham Lilly (R)	John S. Darst (R)	E. Leslie Long (R)	15R, 15D	53R, 33D	5R	William E. Chilton (D)	Nathan Goff Jr. (R)	4R, 2D	Wilson/ Marshall (D) ✓
1915	Henry D. Hatfield (R)	Stuart F. Reed (R)	Armistead Abraham Lilly (R)	John S. Darst (R)	E. Leslie Long (R)	21R, 9D	56R, 27D, 3Fus	5R	William E. Chilton (D)	Nathan Goff Jr. (R)	4D, 2R	Wilson/ Marshall (D) ✓
1916	Henry D. Hatfield (R)	Stuart F. Reed (R)	Armistead Abraham Lilly (R)	John S. Darst (R)	E. Leslie Long (R)	21R, 9D	56R, 27D, 3Fus	5R	William E. Chilton (D)	Nathan Goff Jr. (R)	4D, 2R	Hughes/ Fairbanks (R) ✗
1917	John J. Cornwell (D)	Houston G. Young (R)	Edward T. England (R)	John S. Darst (R)	W. S. Johnson (R)	20R, 10D	52D, 42R	5R	Howard Sutherland (R)	Nathan Goff Jr. (R)	5R, 1D	Hughes/ Fairbanks (R) ✗
1918	John J. Cornwell (D)	Houston G. Young (R)	Edward T. England (R)	John S. Darst (R)	W. S. Johnson (R)	20R, 10D	52D, 42R	5R	Howard Sutherland (R)	Nathan Goff Jr. (R)	5R, 1D	Hughes/ Fairbanks (R) ✗
1919	John J. Cornwell (D)	Houston G. Young (R)	Edward T. England (R)	John S. Darst (R)	W. S. Johnson (R)	23R, 7D	70R, 24D	5R	Howard Sutherland (R)	Davis Elkins (R)	5R, 1D	Hughes/ Fairbanks (R) ✗
1920	John J. Cornwell (D)	Houston G. Young (R)	Edward T. England (R)	John S. Darst (R)	W. S. Johnson (R)	23R, 7D	70R, 24D	5R	Howard Sutherland (R)	Davis Elkins (R)	5R, 1D	Harding/ Coolidge (R) ✓
1921	Ephraim F. Morgan (R)	Houston G. Young (R)	Edward T. England (R)	John C. Bond (R)	W. S. Johnson (R)	26R, 4D	73R, 21D	5R	Howard Sutherland (R)	Davis Elkins (R)	6R	Harding/ Coolidge (R) ✓
1922	Ephraim F. Morgan (R)	Houston G. Young (R)	Edward T. England (R)	John C. Bond (R)	W. S. Johnson (R)	26R, 4D	73R, 21D	5R	Howard Sutherland (R)	Davis Elkins (R)	6R	Harding/ Coolidge (R) ✓
1923	Ephraim F. Morgan (R)	Houston G. Young (R)	Edward T. England (R)	John C. Bond (R)	W. S. Johnson (R)	19R, 11D	65D, 29R	4R, 1D	Matthew M. Neely (D)	Davis Elkins (R)	4D, 2R	Harding/ Coolidge (R) ✓
1924	Ephraim F. Morgan (R)	Houston G. Young (R)	Edward T. England (R)	John C. Bond (R)	W. S. Johnson (R)	19R, 11D	65D, 29R	4R, 1D	Matthew M. Neely (D)	Davis Elkins (R)	4D, 2R	Coolidge/ Dawes (R) ✓
1925	Howard Mason Gore (R)	George W. Sharp (R)	Howard B. Lee (R)	John C. Bond (R)	W. S. Johnson (R)	16R, 14D	55R, 39D	5R	Matthew M. Neely (D)	Guy D. Goff (R)	6R	Coolidge/ Dawes (R) ✓
1926	Howard Mason Gore (R)	George W. Sharp (R)	Howard B. Lee (R)	John C. Bond (R)	W. S. Johnson (R)	16R, 14D	55R, 39D	5R	Matthew M. Neely (D)	Guy D. Goff (R)	6R	Coolidge/ Dawes (R) ✓
1927	Howard Mason Gore (R)	George W. Sharp (R)	Howard B. Lee (R)	Sam T. Mallison	W. S. Johnson (R)	21R, 9D	60R, 33D, 1SqDl	5R	Matthew M. Neely (D)	Guy D. Goff (R)	5R, 1D	Coolidge/ Dawes (R) ✓
1928	Howard Mason Gore (R)	George W. Sharp (R)	Howard B. Lee (R)	Sam T. Mallison	W. S. Johnson (R)	21R, 9D	60R, 33D, 1SqDl	5R	Matthew M. Neely (D)	Guy D. Goff (R)	5R, 1D	Hoover/ Curtis (R) ✓
1929	William G. Conley (R)	George W. Sharp (R)	Howard B. Lee (R)	Edgar C. Lawson (R)	W. S. Johnson (R)	24R, 6D	63R, 31D	5R	Henry D. Hatfield (R)	Guy D. Goff (R)	5R, 1D	Hoover/ Curtis (R) ✓
1930	William G. Conley (R)	George W. Sharp (R)	Howard B. Lee (R)	Edgar C. Lawson (R)	W. S. Johnson (R)	24R, 6D	63R, 31D	5R	Henry D. Hatfield (R)	Guy D. Goff (R)	5R, 1D	Hoover/ Curtis (R) ✓
1931	William G. Conley (R)	George W. Sharp (R)	Howard B. Lee (R)	Edgar C. Lawson (R)	W. S. Johnson (R)	17R, 13D	68D, 26R	5R	Henry D. Hatfield (R)	Matthew M. Neely (D)	4R, 2D	Hoover/ Curtis (R) ✓
1932	William G. Conley (R)	George W. Sharp (R)	Howard B. Lee (R)	Edgar C. Lawson (R)	W. S. Johnson (R)	17R, 13D	68D, 26R	5R	Henry D. Hatfield (R)	Matthew M. Neely (D)	4R, 2D	Roosevelt/ Garner (D) ✓
1933	Herman G. Kump (D)	William Smith O'Brien (D)	Homer A. Holt (D)	Edgar B. Simms (D)	Richard E. Talbott (D)	24D, 6R	79D, 15R	4R, 1D	Henry D. Hatfield (R)	Matthew M. Neely (D)	6D	Roosevelt/ Garner (D) ✓
1934	Herman G. Kump (D)	William Smith O'Brien (D)	Homer A. Holt (D)	Edgar B. Simms (D)	Richard E. Talbott (D)	24D, 6R	79D, 15R	4R, 1D	Henry D. Hatfield (R)	Matthew M. Neely (D)	6D	Roosevelt/ Garner (D) ✓
1935	Herman G. Kump (D)	William Smith O'Brien (D)	Homer A. Holt (D)	Edgar B. Simms (D)	Richard E. Talbott (D)	24D, 6R	82D, 12R	4R, 1D	Rush Holt Sr. (D)	Matthew M. Neely (D)	6D	Roosevelt/ Garner (D) ✓
1936	Herman G. Kump (D)	William Smith O'Brien (D)	Homer A. Holt (D)	Edgar B. Simms (D)	Richard E. Talbott (D)	24D, 6R	82D, 12R	4R, 1D	Rush Holt Sr. (D)	Matthew M. Neely (D)	6D	Roosevelt/ Garner (D) ✓
1937	Homer A. Holt (D)	William Smith O'Brien (D)	Clarence W. Meadows (D)	Edgar B. Simms (D)	Richard E. Talbott (D)	24D, 6R	72D, 22R	3D, 2R	Rush Holt Sr. (D)	Matthew M. Neely (D)	6D	Roosevelt/ Garner (D) ✓
1938	Homer A. Holt (D)	William Smith O'Brien (D)	Clarence W. Meadows (D)	Edgar B. Simms (D)	Richard E. Talbott (D)	24D, 6R	72D, 22R	3D, 2R	Rush Holt Sr. (D)	Matthew M. Neely (D)	6D	Roosevelt/ Garner (D) ✓
1939	Homer A. Holt (D)	William Smith O'Brien (D)	Clarence W. Meadows (D)	Edgar B. Simms (D)	Richard E. Talbott (D)	27D, 5R	70D, 24R	3D, 2R	Rush Holt Sr. (D)	Matthew M. Neely (D)	5D, 1R	Roosevelt/ Garner (D) ✓
1940	Homer A. Holt (D)	William Smith O'Brien (D)	Clarence W. Meadows (D)	Edgar B. Simms (D)	Richard E. Talbott (D)	27D, 5R	70D, 24R	3D, 2R	Rush Holt Sr. (D)	Matthew M. Neely (D)	5D, 1R	Roosevelt/ Wallace (D) ✓
1941	Matthew M. Neely (D)	William Smith O'Brien (D)	Clarence W. Meadows (D)	Edgar B. Simms (D)	Richard E. Talbott (D)	26D, 6R	74D, 20R	5D	Harley M. Kilgore (D)	Joseph Rosier (D)	6D	Roosevelt/ Wallace (D) ✓
1942	Matthew M. Neely (D)	William Smith O'Brien (D)	William S. Wysong (D)	Edgar B. Simms (D)	Richard E. Talbott (D)	26D, 6R	74D, 20R	5D	Harley M. Kilgore (D)	Hugh Ike Shott (R)	6D	Roosevelt/ Wallace (D) ✓
1943	Matthew M. Neely (D)	William Smith O'Brien (D)	James Kay Thomas (D)	Edgar B. Simms (D)	Richard E. Talbott (D)	21D, 11R	50D, 44R	5D	Harley M. Kilgore (D)	Chapman Revercomb (R)	4D, 2R	Roosevelt/ Wallace (D) ✓
1944	Matthew M. Neely (D)	William Smith O'Brien (D)	James Kay Thomas (D)	Edgar B. Simms (D)	Richard E. Talbott (D)	21D, 11R	50D, 44R	5D	Harley M. Kilgore (D)	Chapman Revercomb (R)	4D, 2R	Roosevelt/ Truman (D) ✓
1945	Clarence W. Meadows (D)	William Smith O'Brien (D)	Ira J. Partlow (D)	Edgar B. Simms (D)	Richard E. Talbott (D)	21D, 11R	65D, 29R	5D	Harley M. Kilgore (D)	Chapman Revercomb (R)	5D, 1R	Roosevelt/ Truman (D) ✓
1946	Clarence W. Meadows (D)	William Smith O'Brien (D)	Ira J. Partlow (D)	Edgar B. Simms (D)	Richard E. Talbott (D)	21D, 11R	65D, 29R	5D	Harley M. Kilgore (D)	Chapman Revercomb (R)	5D, 1R	Roosevelt/ Truman (D) ✓
1947	Clarence W. Meadows (D)	William Smith O'Brien (D)	Ira J. Partlow (D)	Edgar B. Simms (D)	Richard E. Talbott (D)	20D, 12R	56D, 38R	5D	Harley M. Kilgore (D)	Chapman Revercomb (R)	4R, 2D	Roosevelt/ Truman (D) ✓
1948	Clarence W. Meadows (D)	Daniel Pitt O'Brien (D)	Ira J. Partlow (D)	Edgar B. Simms (D)	Richard E. Talbott (D)	20D, 12R	56D, 38R	5D	Harley M. Kilgore (D)	Chapman Revercomb (R)	4R, 2D	Truman/ Barkley (D) ✓
1949	Okey Patteson (D)	Daniel Pitt O'Brien (D)	William C. Marland (D)	Edgar B. Simms (D)	Richard E. Talbott (D)	20D, 12R	78D, 16R	5D	Harley M. Kilgore (D)	Matthew M. Neely (D)	6D	Truman/ Barkley (D) ✓

== 1950–present ==
Year	Executive offices						State Legislature		Supreme Court of Appeals	United States Congress			Electoral votes
Year	Governor	Secretary of State	Attorney General	Auditor	Treasurer	Agriculture Commissioner	State Senate	State House	Supreme Court of Appeals	U.S. Senator (Class I)	U.S. Senator (Class II)	U.S. House	Electoral votes
1950	Okey Patteson (D)	Daniel Pitt O'Brien (D)	William C. Marland (D)	Edgar B. Simms (D)	William H. Ansel Jr. (D)	J. B. McLaughlin (D) (Note: Appointed in 1932.) (Note: Appointed by governor; not an elected position until 1964.)	20D, 12R	78D, 16R	5D	Harley M. Kilgore (D)	Matthew M. Neely (D)	6D	Truman/ Barkley (D) ✓
1951	Okey Patteson (D)	Daniel Pitt O'Brien (D)	William C. Marland (D)	Edgar B. Simms (D)	William H. Ansel Jr. (D)	J. B. McLaughlin (D)	20D, 12R	67D, 27R	5D	Harley M. Kilgore (D)	Matthew M. Neely (D)	6D	Truman/ Barkley (D) ✓
1952	Okey Patteson (D)	Daniel Pitt O'Brien (D)	Chauncey Browning Sr. (D)	Edgar B. Simms (D)	William H. Ansel Jr. (D)	J. B. McLaughlin (D)	20D, 12R	67D, 27R	5D	Harley M. Kilgore (D)	Matthew M. Neely (D)	6D	Stevenson/ Sparkman (D) ✗
1953	William C. Marland (D)	Daniel Pitt O'Brien (D)	John G. Fox (D)	Edgar B. Simms (D)	William H. Ansel Jr. (D)	J. B. McLaughlin (D)	22D, 10R	67D, 33R	5D	Harley M. Kilgore (D)	Matthew M. Neely (D)	5D, 1R	Stevenson/ Sparkman (D) ✗
1954	William C. Marland (D)	Daniel Pitt O'Brien (D)	John G. Fox (D)	Edgar B. Simms (D)	William H. Ansel Jr. (D)	J. B. McLaughlin (D)	22D, 10R	67D, 33R	5D	Harley M. Kilgore (D)	Matthew M. Neely (D)	5D, 1R	Stevenson/ Sparkman (D) ✗
1955	William C. Marland (D)	Daniel Pitt O'Brien (D)	John G. Fox (D)	Edgar B. Simms (D)	William H. Ansel Jr. (D)	J. B. McLaughlin (D)	23D, 9R	76D, 24R	5D	Harley M. Kilgore (D)	Matthew M. Neely (D)	5D, 1R	Stevenson/ Sparkman (D) ✗
1956	William C. Marland (D)	Daniel Pitt O'Brien (D)	John G. Fox (D)	Edgar B. Simms (D)	William H. Ansel Jr. (D)	John T. Johnson (R)	23D, 9R	76D, 24R	5D	William Laird III (D)	Matthew M. Neely (D)	5D, 1R	Eisenhower/ Nixon (R) ✓
1957	Cecil H. Underwood (R)	Helen F. Holt (R)	Wally Barron (D)	Edgar B. Simms (D)	Orel J. Skeen (D)	John T. Johnson (R)	21D, 11R	58D, 42R	5D	Chapman Revercomb (R)	Matthew M. Neely (D)	5D, 1R	Eisenhower/ Nixon (R) ✓
1958	Cecil H. Underwood (R)	Joe F. Burdett (D)	Wally Barron (D)	Edgar B. Simms (D)	Orel J. Skeen (D)	John T. Johnson (R)	21D, 11R	58D, 42R	5D	Chapman Revercomb (R)	John D. Hoblitzell Jr. (R)	5D, 1R	Eisenhower/ Nixon (R) ✓
1958	Cecil H. Underwood (R)	Joe F. Burdett (D)	Wally Barron (D)	Edgar B. Simms (D)	Orel J. Skeen (D)	John T. Johnson (R)	21D, 11R	58D, 42R	4D, 1R	Chapman Revercomb (R)	John D. Hoblitzell Jr. (R)	5D, 1R	Eisenhower/ Nixon (R) ✓
1959	Cecil H. Underwood (R)	Joe F. Burdett (D)	Wally Barron (D)	Edgar B. Simms (D)	Orel J. Skeen (D)	John T. Johnson (R)	23D, 9R	85D, 15R	5D	Robert Byrd (D)	Jennings Randolph (D)	5D, 1R	Eisenhower/ Nixon (R) ✓
1960	Cecil H. Underwood (R)	Joe F. Burdett (D)	Wally Barron (D)	Litz McGuire (R)	Orel J. Skeen (D)	John T. Johnson (R)	23D, 9R	85D, 15R	5D	Robert Byrd (D)	Jennings Randolph (D)	5D, 1R	Kennedy/ Johnson (D) ✓
1961	Wally Barron (D)	Joe F. Burdett (D)	C. Donald Robertson (D)	Denzil L. Gainer (D)	John H. Kelly (D)	John T. Johnson (R)	25D, 7R	82D, 18R	5D	Robert Byrd (D)	Jennings Randolph (D)	5D, 1R	Kennedy/ Johnson (D) ✓
1962	Wally Barron (D)	Joe F. Burdett (D)	C. Donald Robertson (D)	Denzil L. Gainer (D)	John H. Kelly (D)	John T. Johnson (R)	25D, 7R	82D, 18R	5D	Robert Byrd (D)	Jennings Randolph (D)	5D, 1R	Kennedy/ Johnson (D) ✓
1963	Wally Barron (D)	Joe F. Burdett (D)	C. Donald Robertson (D)	Denzil L. Gainer (D)	John H. Kelly (D)	John T. Johnson (R)	23D, 9R	76D, 24R	5D	Robert Byrd (D)	Jennings Randolph (D)	4D, 1R	Kennedy/ Johnson (D) ✓
1964	Wally Barron (D)	Joe F. Burdett (D)	C. Donald Robertson (D)	Denzil L. Gainer (D)	John H. Kelly (D)	John T. Johnson (R)	23D, 9R	76D, 24R	5D	Robert Byrd (D)	Jennings Randolph (D)	4D, 1R	Johnson/ Humphrey (D) ✓
1965	Hulett C. Smith (D)	Robert D. Bailey Jr. (D)	C. Donald Robertson (D)	Denzil L. Gainer (D)	John H. Kelly (D)	Gus Douglass (D)	27D, 7R	91D, 9R	5D	Robert Byrd (D)	Jennings Randolph (D)	4D, 1R	Johnson/ Humphrey (D) ✓
1966	Hulett C. Smith (D)	Robert D. Bailey Jr. (D)	C. Donald Robertson (D)	Denzil L. Gainer (D)	John H. Kelly (D)	Gus Douglass (D)	27D, 7R	91D, 9R	5D	Robert Byrd (D)	Jennings Randolph (D)	4D, 1R	Johnson/ Humphrey (D) ✓
1967	Hulett C. Smith (D)	Robert D. Bailey Jr. (D)	C. Donald Robertson (D)	Denzil L. Gainer (D)	John H. Kelly (D)	Gus Douglass (D)	25D, 9R	65D, 35R	5D	Robert Byrd (D)	Jennings Randolph (D)	4D, 1R	Johnson/ Humphrey (D) ✓
1968	Hulett C. Smith (D)	Robert D. Bailey Jr. (D)	C. Donald Robertson (D)	Denzil L. Gainer (D)	John H. Kelly (D)	Gus Douglass (D)	25D, 9R	65D, 35R	5D	Robert Byrd (D)	Jennings Randolph (D)	4D, 1R	Humphrey/ Muskie (D) ✗
1969	Arch A. Moore Jr. (R)	Jay Rockefeller (D)	Chauncey H. Browning Jr. (D)	Denzil L. Gainer (D)	John H. Kelly (D)	Gus Douglass (D)	22D, 12R	63D, 37R	5D	Robert Byrd (D)	Jennings Randolph (D)	4D, 1R	Humphrey/ Muskie (D) ✗
1970	Arch A. Moore Jr. (R)	Jay Rockefeller (D)	Chauncey H. Browning Jr. (D)	Denzil L. Gainer (D)	John H. Kelly (D)	Gus Douglass (D)	22D, 12R	63D, 37R	5D	Robert Byrd (D)	Jennings Randolph (D)	4D, 1R	Humphrey/ Muskie (D) ✗
1971	Arch A. Moore Jr. (R)	Jay Rockefeller (D)	Chauncey H. Browning Jr. (D)	Denzil L. Gainer (D)	John H. Kelly (D)	Gus Douglass (D)	23D, 11R	68D, 32R	5D	Robert Byrd (D)	Jennings Randolph (D)	5D	Humphrey/ Muskie (D) ✗
1971	Arch A. Moore Jr. (R)	Jay Rockefeller (D)	Chauncey H. Browning Jr. (D)	Denzil L. Gainer (D)	John H. Kelly (D)	Gus Douglass (D)	23D, 11R	68D, 32R	4D, 1R	Robert Byrd (D)	Jennings Randolph (D)	5D	Humphrey/ Muskie (D) ✗
1972	Arch A. Moore Jr. (R)	Hike Heiskell (R)	Chauncey H. Browning Jr. (D)	John M. Gates (R)	John H. Kelly (D)	Gus Douglass (D)	23D, 11R	68D, 32R	4D, 1R	Robert Byrd (D)	Jennings Randolph (D)	5D	Nixon/ Agnew (R) ✓
1972	Arch A. Moore Jr. (R)	Hike Heiskell (R)	Chauncey H. Browning Jr. (D)	John M. Gates (R)	John H. Kelly (D)	Gus Douglass (D)	23D, 11R	68D, 32R	3R, 2D	Robert Byrd (D)	Jennings Randolph (D)	5D	Nixon/ Agnew (R) ✓
1973	Arch A. Moore Jr. (R)	Hike Heiskell (R)	Chauncey H. Browning Jr. (D)	John M. Gates (R)	John H. Kelly (D)	Gus Douglass (D)	24D, 10R	57D, 43R	4D, 1R	Robert Byrd (D)	Jennings Randolph (D)	4D	Nixon/ Agnew (R) ✓
1974	Arch A. Moore Jr. (R)	Hike Heiskell (R)	Chauncey H. Browning Jr. (D)	John M. Gates (R)	John H. Kelly (D)	Gus Douglass (D)	24D, 10R	57D, 43R	4D, 1R	Robert Byrd (D)	Jennings Randolph (D)	4D	Nixon/ Agnew (R) ✓
1975	Arch A. Moore Jr. (R)	James R. McCartney (R)	Chauncey H. Browning Jr. (D)	John M. Gates (R)	Ronald G. Pearson (R)	Gus Douglass (D)	26D, 8R	87D, 13R	4D, 1R	Robert Byrd (D)	Jennings Randolph (D)	4D	Nixon/ Agnew (R) ✓
1975	Arch A. Moore Jr. (R)	James R. McCartney (R)	Chauncey H. Browning Jr. (D)	John M. Gates (R)	Ronald G. Pearson (R)	Gus Douglass (D)	26D, 8R	87D, 13R	3D, 2R	Robert Byrd (D)	Jennings Randolph (D)	4D	Nixon/ Agnew (R) ✓
1976	Arch A. Moore Jr. (R)	James R. McCartney (R)	Chauncey H. Browning Jr. (D)	John M. Gates (R)	Ronald G. Pearson (R)	Gus Douglass (D)	26D, 8R	87D, 13R	3D, 2R	Robert Byrd (D)	Jennings Randolph (D)	4D	Carter/ Mondale (D) ✓
1977	Jay Rockefeller (D)	A. James Manchin (D)	Chauncey H. Browning Jr. (D)	Glen Gainer Jr. (D)	Larrie Bailey (D)	Gus Douglass (D)	28D, 6R	91D, 9R	5D	Robert Byrd (D)	Jennings Randolph (D)	4D	Carter/ Mondale (D) ✓
1978	Jay Rockefeller (D)	A. James Manchin (D)	Chauncey H. Browning Jr. (D)	Glen Gainer Jr. (D)	Larrie Bailey (D)	Gus Douglass (D)	28D, 6R	91D, 9R	5D	Robert Byrd (D)	Jennings Randolph (D)	4D	Carter/ Mondale (D) ✓
1979	Jay Rockefeller (D)	A. James Manchin (D)	Chauncey H. Browning Jr. (D)	Glen Gainer Jr. (D)	Larrie Bailey (D)	Gus Douglass (D)	26D, 8R	74D, 26R	5D	Robert Byrd (D)	Jennings Randolph (D)	4D	Carter/ Mondale (D) ✓
1980	Jay Rockefeller (D)	A. James Manchin (D)	Chauncey H. Browning Jr. (D)	Glen Gainer Jr. (D)	Larrie Bailey (D)	Gus Douglass (D)	26D, 8R	74D, 26R	5D	Robert Byrd (D)	Jennings Randolph (D)	4D	Carter/ Mondale (D) ✗
1981	Jay Rockefeller (D)	A. James Manchin (D)	Chauncey H. Browning Jr. (D)	Glen Gainer Jr. (D)	Larrie Bailey (D)	Gus Douglass (D)	27D, 7R	78D, 22R	5D	Robert Byrd (D)	Jennings Randolph (D)	2R, 2D	Carter/ Mondale (D) ✗
1982	Jay Rockefeller (D)	A. James Manchin (D)	Chauncey H. Browning Jr. (D)	Glen Gainer Jr. (D)	Larrie Bailey (D)	Gus Douglass (D)	27D, 7R	78D, 22R	5D	Robert Byrd (D)	Jennings Randolph (D)	2R, 2D	Carter/ Mondale (D) ✗
1983	Jay Rockefeller (D)	A. James Manchin (D)	Chauncey H. Browning Jr. (D)	Glen Gainer Jr. (D)	Larrie Bailey (D)	Gus Douglass (D)	31D, 3R	87D, 13R	5D	Robert Byrd (D)	Jennings Randolph (D)	4D	Carter/ Mondale (D) ✗
1984	Jay Rockefeller (D)	A. James Manchin (D)	Chauncey H. Browning Jr. (D)	Glen Gainer Jr. (D)	Larrie Bailey (D)	Gus Douglass (D)	31D, 3R	87D, 13R	5D	Robert Byrd (D)	Jennings Randolph (D)	4D	Reagan/ Bush (R) ✓
1985	Arch A. Moore Jr. (R)	Ken Hechler (D)	Charlie Brown (D)	Glen Gainer Jr. (D)	A. James Manchin (D)	Gus Douglass (D)	30D, 4R	73D, 27R	5D	Robert Byrd (D)	Jay Rockefeller (D)	4D	Reagan/ Bush (R) ✓
1986	Arch A. Moore Jr. (R)	Ken Hechler (D)	Charlie Brown (D)	Glen Gainer Jr. (D)	A. James Manchin (D)	Gus Douglass (D)	30D, 4R	73D, 27R	5D	Robert Byrd (D)	Jay Rockefeller (D)	4D	Reagan/ Bush (R) ✓
1987	Arch A. Moore Jr. (R)	Ken Hechler (D)	Charlie Brown (D)	Glen Gainer Jr. (D)	A. James Manchin (D)	Gus Douglass (D)	28D, 6R	78D, 22R	5D	Robert Byrd (D)	Jay Rockefeller (D)	4D	Reagan/ Bush (R) ✓
1988	Arch A. Moore Jr. (R)	Ken Hechler (D)	Charlie Brown (D)	Glen Gainer Jr. (D)	A. James Manchin (D)	Gus Douglass (D)	28D, 6R	78D, 22R	5D	Robert Byrd (D)	Jay Rockefeller (D)	4D	Dukakis/ Bentsen (D) ✗
1989	Gaston Caperton (D)	Ken Hechler (D)	Roger W. Tompkins II (D)	Glen Gainer Jr. (D)	Thomas E. Loehr (D)	Cleve Benedict (R)	29D, 5R	79D, 21R	5D	Robert Byrd (D)	Jay Rockefeller (D)	4D	Dukakis/ Bentsen (D) ✗
1990	Gaston Caperton (D)	Ken Hechler (D)	Mario Palumbo (D)	Glen Gainer Jr. (D)	Thomas E. Loehr (D)	Cleve Benedict (R)	29D, 5R	79D, 21R	5D	Robert Byrd (D)	Jay Rockefeller (D)	4D	Dukakis/ Bentsen (D) ✗
1991	Gaston Caperton (D)	Ken Hechler (D)	Mario Palumbo (D)	Glen Gainer Jr. (D)	Larrie Bailey (D)	Cleve Benedict (R)	33D, 1R	74D, 26R	5D	Robert Byrd (D)	Jay Rockefeller (D)	4D	Dukakis/ Bentsen (D) ✗
1992	Gaston Caperton (D)	Ken Hechler (D)	Mario Palumbo (D)	Glen Gainer Jr. (D)	Larrie Bailey (D)	Cleve Benedict (R)	33D, 1R	74D, 26R	5D	Robert Byrd (D)	Jay Rockefeller (D)	4D	Clinton/ Gore (D) ✓
1993	Gaston Caperton (D)	Ken Hechler (D)	Darrell McGraw (D)	Glen Gainer III (D)	Larrie Bailey (D)	Gus Douglass (D)	32D, 2R	79D, 21R	5D	Robert Byrd (D)	Jay Rockefeller (D)	3D	Clinton/ Gore (D) ✓
1994	Gaston Caperton (D)	Ken Hechler (D)	Darrell McGraw (D)	Glen Gainer III (D)	Larrie Bailey (D)	Gus Douglass (D)	32D, 2R	79D, 21R	5D	Robert Byrd (D)	Jay Rockefeller (D)	3D	Clinton/ Gore (D) ✓
1995	Gaston Caperton (D)	Ken Hechler (D)	Darrell McGraw (D)	Glen Gainer III (D)	Larrie Bailey (D)	Gus Douglass (D)	26D, 8R	69D, 31R	5D	Robert Byrd (D)	Jay Rockefeller (D)	3D	Clinton/ Gore (D) ✓
1996	Gaston Caperton (D)	Ken Hechler (D)	Darrell McGraw (D)	Glen Gainer III (D)	Larrie Bailey (D)	Gus Douglass (D)	26D, 8R	69D, 31R	5D	Robert Byrd (D)	Jay Rockefeller (D)	3D	Clinton/ Gore (D) ✓
1997	Cecil H. Underwood (R)	Ken Hechler (D)	Darrell McGraw (D)	Glen Gainer III (D)	John Perdue (D)	Gus Douglass (D)	25D, 9R	74D, 26R	5D	Robert Byrd (D)	Jay Rockefeller (D)	3D	Clinton/ Gore (D) ✓
1998	Cecil H. Underwood (R)	Ken Hechler (D)	Darrell McGraw (D)	Glen Gainer III (D)	John Perdue (D)	Gus Douglass (D)	25D, 9R	74D, 26R	4D, 1R	Robert Byrd (D)	Jay Rockefeller (D)	3D	Clinton/ Gore (D) ✓
1999	Cecil H. Underwood (R)	Ken Hechler (D)	Darrell McGraw (D)	Glen Gainer III (D)	John Perdue (D)	Gus Douglass (D)	29D, 5R	75D, 25R	5D	Robert Byrd (D)	Jay Rockefeller (D)	3D	Clinton/ Gore (D) ✓
2000	Cecil H. Underwood (R)	Ken Hechler (D)	Darrell McGraw (D)	Glen Gainer III (D)	John Perdue (D)	Gus Douglass (D)	29D, 5R	75D, 25R	4D, 1R	Robert Byrd (D)	Jay Rockefeller (D)	3D	Bush/ Cheney (R) ✓
2001	Bob Wise (D)	Joe Manchin (D)	Darrell McGraw (D)	Glen Gainer III (D)	John Perdue (D)	Gus Douglass (D)	28D, 6R	75D, 25R	5D	Robert Byrd (D)	Jay Rockefeller (D)	2D, 1R	Bush/ Cheney (R) ✓
2002	Bob Wise (D)	Joe Manchin (D)	Darrell McGraw (D)	Glen Gainer III (D)	John Perdue (D)	Gus Douglass (D)	28D, 6R	75D, 25R	5D	Robert Byrd (D)	Jay Rockefeller (D)	2D, 1R	Bush/ Cheney (R) ✓
2003	Bob Wise (D)	Joe Manchin (D)	Darrell McGraw (D)	Glen Gainer III (D)	John Perdue (D)	Gus Douglass (D)	24D, 10R	68D, 32R	5D	Robert Byrd (D)	Jay Rockefeller (D)	2D, 1R	Bush/ Cheney (R) ✓
2004	Bob Wise (D)	Joe Manchin (D)	Darrell McGraw (D)	Glen Gainer III (D)	John Perdue (D)	Gus Douglass (D)	24D, 10R	68D, 32R	5D	Robert Byrd (D)	Jay Rockefeller (D)	2D, 1R	Bush/ Cheney (R) ✓
2005	Joe Manchin (D)	Betty Ireland (R)	Darrell McGraw (D)	Glen Gainer III (D)	John Perdue (D)	Gus Douglass (D)	21D, 13R	68D, 32R	4D, 1R	Robert Byrd (D)	Jay Rockefeller (D)	2D, 1R	Bush/ Cheney (R) ✓
2006	Joe Manchin (D)	Betty Ireland (R)	Darrell McGraw (D)	Glen Gainer III (D)	John Perdue (D)	Gus Douglass (D)	21D, 13R	68D, 32R	4D, 1R	Robert Byrd (D)	Jay Rockefeller (D)	2D, 1R	Bush/ Cheney (R) ✓
2007	Joe Manchin (D)	Betty Ireland (R)	Darrell McGraw (D)	Glen Gainer III (D)	John Perdue (D)	Gus Douglass (D)	23D, 11R	72D, 28R	4D, 1R	Robert Byrd (D)	Jay Rockefeller (D)	2D, 1R	Bush/ Cheney (R) ✓
2008	Joe Manchin (D)	Betty Ireland (R)	Darrell McGraw (D)	Glen Gainer III (D)	John Perdue (D)	Gus Douglass (D)	23D, 11R	72D, 28R	4D, 1R	Robert Byrd (D)	Jay Rockefeller (D)	2D, 1R	McCain/ Palin (R) ✗
2009	Joe Manchin (D)	Natalie Tennant (D)	Darrell McGraw (D)	Glen Gainer III (D)	John Perdue (D)	Gus Douglass (D)	26D, 8R	71D, 29R	4D, 1R	Robert Byrd (D)	Jay Rockefeller (D)	2D, 1R	McCain/ Palin (R) ✗
2010	Joe Manchin (D)	Natalie Tennant (D)	Darrell McGraw (D)	Glen Gainer III (D)	John Perdue (D)	Gus Douglass (D)	26D, 8R	71D, 29R	4D, 1R	Carte Goodwin (D)	Jay Rockefeller (D)	2D, 1R	McCain/ Palin (R) ✗
2011	Earl Ray Tomblin (D)	Natalie Tennant (D)	Darrell McGraw (D)	Glen Gainer III (D)	John Perdue (D)	Gus Douglass (D)	28D, 6R	65D, 35R	4D, 1R	Joe Manchin (D)	Jay Rockefeller (D)	2R, 1D	McCain/ Palin (R) ✗
2012	Earl Ray Tomblin (D)	Natalie Tennant (D)	Darrell McGraw (D)	Glen Gainer III (D)	John Perdue (D)	Gus Douglass (D)	28D, 6R	65D, 35R	4D, 1R	Joe Manchin (D)	Jay Rockefeller (D)	2R, 1D	Romney/ Ryan (R) ✗
2013	Earl Ray Tomblin (D)	Natalie Tennant (D)	Patrick Morrisey (R)	Glen Gainer III (D)	John Perdue (D)	Walt Helmick (D)	25D, 9R	54D, 46R	3D, 2R	Joe Manchin (D)	Jay Rockefeller (D)	2R, 1D	Romney/ Ryan (R) ✗
2014	Earl Ray Tomblin (D)	Natalie Tennant (D)	Patrick Morrisey (R)	Glen Gainer III (D)	John Perdue (D)	Walt Helmick (D)	24D, 10R	53D, 47R	3D, 2R	Joe Manchin (D)	Jay Rockefeller (D)	2R, 1D	Romney/ Ryan (R) ✗
2015	Earl Ray Tomblin (D)	Natalie Tennant (D)	Patrick Morrisey (R)	Glen Gainer III (D)	John Perdue (D)	Walt Helmick (D)	18R, 16D	64R, 36D	3D, 2R	Joe Manchin (D)	Shelley Moore Capito (R)	3R	Romney/ Ryan (R) ✗
2016	Earl Ray Tomblin (D)	Natalie Tennant (D)	Patrick Morrisey (R)	Lisa Hopkins (D)	John Perdue (D)	Walt Helmick (D)	18R, 16D	64R, 36D	3D, 2R	Joe Manchin (D)	Shelley Moore Capito (R)	3R	Trump/ Pence (R) ✓
2017	Jim Justice (D)	Mac Warner (R)	Patrick Morrisey (R)	JB McCuskey (R)	John Perdue (D)	Kent Leonhardt (R)	22R, 12D	64R, 36D (Note: One of the members of the legislature was elected as a Democrat, but switched parties to Republican.)	3D, 2R	Joe Manchin (D)	Shelley Moore Capito (R)	3R	Trump/ Pence (R) ✓
2017	Jim Justice (R) (Note: Governor Justice announced on August 3, 2017, that he was switching his party registration from Democratic to Republican.)	Mac Warner (R)	Patrick Morrisey (R)	JB McCuskey (R)	John Perdue (D)	Kent Leonhardt (R)	22R, 12D	64R, 36D	3D, 2R	Joe Manchin (D)	Shelley Moore Capito (R)	3R	Trump/ Pence (R) ✓
2018	Jim Justice (R)	Mac Warner (R)	Patrick Morrisey (R)	JB McCuskey (R)	John Perdue (D)	Kent Leonhardt (R)	22R, 12D	64R, 36D	3D, 2R	Joe Manchin (D)	Shelley Moore Capito (R)	3R	Trump/ Pence (R) ✓
2018	Jim Justice (R)	Mac Warner (R)	Patrick Morrisey (R)	JB McCuskey (R)	John Perdue (D)	Kent Leonhardt (R)	22R, 12D	64R, 36D	4R, 1D	Joe Manchin (D)	Shelley Moore Capito (R)	3R	Trump/ Pence (R) ✓
2019	Jim Justice (R)	Mac Warner (R)	Patrick Morrisey (R)	JB McCuskey (R)	John Perdue (D)	Kent Leonhardt (R)	20R, 14D	57R, 43D	3R, 2D	Joe Manchin (D)	Shelley Moore Capito (R)	3R	Trump/ Pence (R) ✓
2020	Jim Justice (R)	Mac Warner (R)	Patrick Morrisey (R)	JB McCuskey (R)	John Perdue (D)	Kent Leonhardt (R)	20R, 14D	57R, 43D	3R, 2D	Joe Manchin (D)	Shelley Moore Capito (R)	3R	Trump/ Pence (R) ✗
2021	Jim Justice (R)	Mac Warner (R)	Patrick Morrisey (R)	JB McCuskey (R)	Riley Moore (R)	Kent Leonhardt (R)	23R, 11D	76R, 24D	3R, 2D	Joe Manchin (D)	Shelley Moore Capito (R)	3R	Trump/ Pence (R) ✗
2021	Jim Justice (R)	Mac Warner (R)	Patrick Morrisey (R)	JB McCuskey (R)	Riley Moore (R)	Kent Leonhardt (R)	23R, 11D	77R, 23D	3R, 2D	Joe Manchin (D)	Shelley Moore Capito (R)	3R	Trump/ Pence (R) ✗
2021	Jim Justice (R)	Mac Warner (R)	Patrick Morrisey (R)	JB McCuskey (R)	Riley Moore (R)	Kent Leonhardt (R)	23R, 11D	78R, 22D	3R, 2D	Joe Manchin (D)	Shelley Moore Capito (R)	3R	Trump/ Pence (R) ✗
2022	Jim Justice (R)	Mac Warner (R)	Patrick Morrisey (R)	JB McCuskey (R)	Riley Moore (R)	Kent Leonhardt (R)	23R, 11D	78R, 22D	3R, 2D	Joe Manchin (D)	Shelley Moore Capito (R)	3R	Trump/ Pence (R) ✗
2023	Jim Justice (R)	Mac Warner (R)	Patrick Morrisey (R)	JB McCuskey (R)	Riley Moore (R)	Kent Leonhardt (R)	31R, 3D	89R, 11D	3R, 2D	Joe Manchin (D)	Shelley Moore Capito (R)	2R	Trump/ Pence (R) ✗
2024	Jim Justice (R)	Mac Warner (R)	Patrick Morrisey (R)	JB McCuskey (R)	Riley Moore (R)	Kent Leonhardt (R)	31R, 3D	89R, 11D	3R, 2D	Joe Manchin (D)	Shelley Moore Capito (R)	2R	Trump/ Vance (R) ✓
2024	Jim Justice (R)	Mac Warner (R)	Patrick Morrisey (R)	JB McCuskey (R)	Riley Moore (R)	Kent Leonhardt (R)	31R, 3D	89R, 11D	3R, 2D	Joe Manchin (I) (Note: Senator Manchin announced on May 31, 2024, that he was switching his party registration from Democratic to independent. See Independent Democrat.)	Shelley Moore Capito (R)	2R	Trump/ Vance (R) ✓
2025	Patrick Morrisey (R)	Kris Warner (R)	JB McCuskey (R)	Mark Hunt (R)	Larry Pack (R)	Kent Leonhardt (R)	32R, 2D	91R, 9D	4R, 1D	Jim Justice (R)	Shelley Moore Capito (R)	2R	Trump/ Vance (R) ✓
2026	Patrick Morrisey (R)	Kris Warner (R)	JB McCuskey (R)	Mark Hunt (R)	Larry Pack (R)	Kent Leonhardt (R)	32R, 2D	91R, 9D	4R, 1D	Jim Justice (R)	Shelley Moore Capito (R)	2R	Trump/ Vance (R) ✓
2027	Patrick Morrisey (R)	Kris Warner (R)	JB McCuskey (R)	Mark Hunt (R)	Larry Pack (R)	Kent Leonhardt (R)	30R, 4D	79R, 21D	4R, 1D	Jim Justice (R)	Shelley Moore Capito (R)	2R	Trump/ Vance (R) ✓

Key to party colors and abbreviations for members of the U.S. Congress and other politicians or officials
Alaskan Independence (AKIP) Know Nothing (KN) American Labor (AL) Anti-Jacksonian (Anti-J); National Republican (NR) Anti-Administration (AA) Anti-Masonic (Anti-M) Conservative (Con) Covenant (Cov)	Democratic (D) Democratic–Farmer–Labor (DFL) Democratic–NPL (D-NPL) Dixiecrat (Dix), States' Rights (SR) Democratic-Republican (DR) Farmer–Labor (FL) Federalist (F); Pro-Administration (PA)	Free Soil (FS) Fusion (Fus) Greenback (GB) Independence (IPM) Jacksonian (J) Liberal (Lib) Libertarian (L) National Union (NU)	Nonpartisan League (NPL) Nullifier (N) Opposition Northern (O); Opposition Southern (O) Populist (Pop) Progressive (Prog) Prohibition (Proh) Readjuster (Rea)	Republican (R) Silver (Sv) Silver Republican (SvR) Socialist (Soc) Union (U) Unconditional Union (UU) Vermont Progressive (VP) Whig (W)	Independent (I) Nonpartisan (NP)

== See also ==
- Politics in West Virginia
- Politics of West Virginia
