= Helen Holt =

Helen Holt may refer to:

- Helen F. Holt (1913–2015), American politician from West Virginia
- Helen K. Holt (1937–2016), American physicist
- Helen Maud Holt (1858–1937), English actress
