= Rush Holt =

Rush Holt may refer to:

- Rush Holt Sr. (1905–1955), American politician, Senator from West Virginia
- Rush Holt Jr. (born 1948), American physicist and politician, Representative from New Jersey, son of the above
