= George W. Sharp =

American politician from West Virginia (1880-1954)

George Winters Sharp
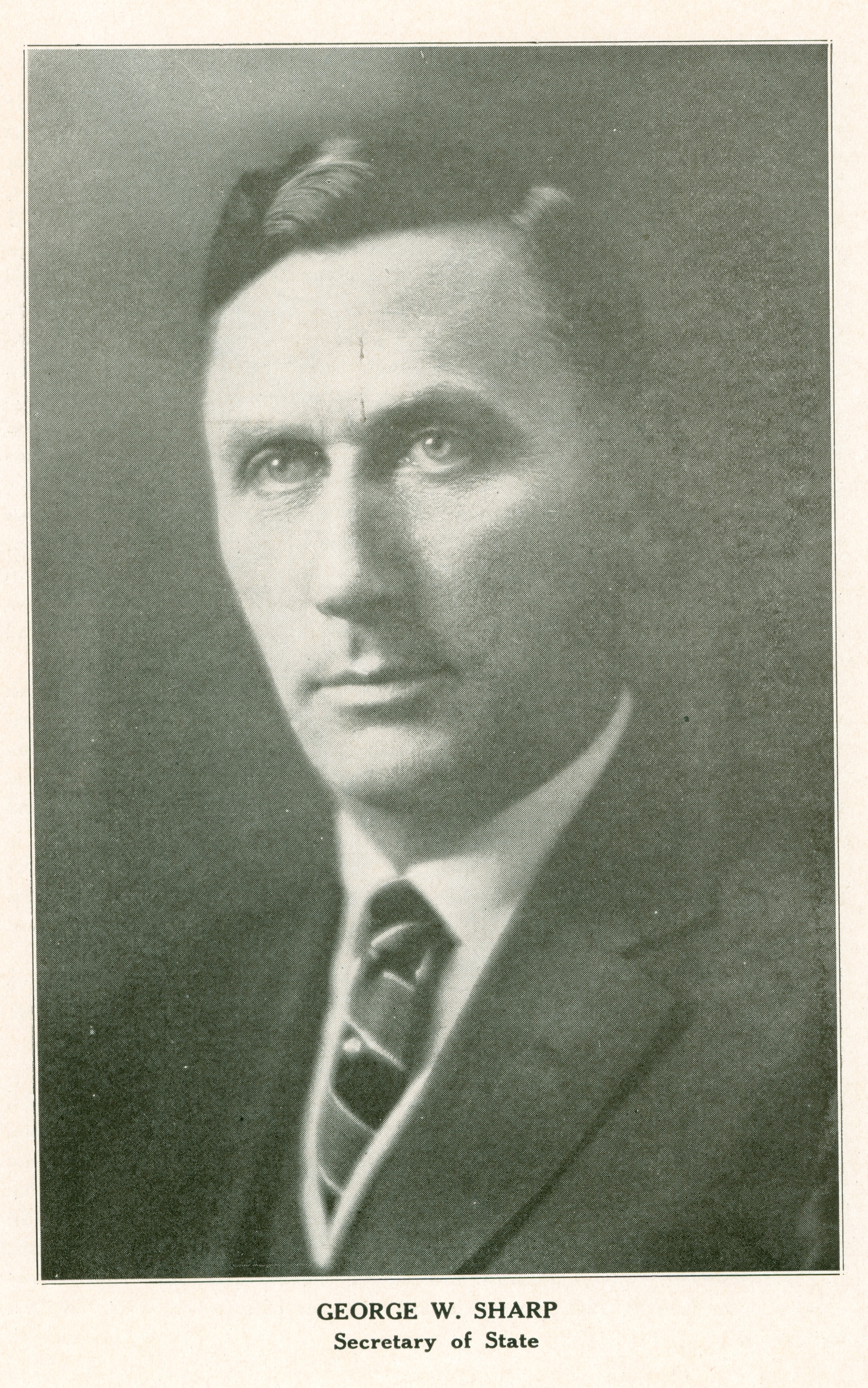

16th Secretary of State of West Virginia
- In office March 4, 1925 – March 4, 1933
- Governor: Howard Mason Gore; William G. Conley
- Preceded by: Houston G. Young
- Succeeded by: William Smith O'Brien

Personal details
- Born: June 20, 1880 Pocahontas County, West Virginia, U.S.
- Died: October 24, 1954 (aged 74) Marlinton, West Virginia, U.S.
- Political party: Republican

George Winters Sharp (June 20, 1880 – October 24, 1954) was an American politician who served as the 16th Secretary of State of West Virginia as a member of the Republican party from March 4, 1925, until March 4, 1933.

== Early life ==
Sharp was born on June 20, 1880, in Pocahontas County, West Virginia to Charles Osborne Wade Sharp (1844–1892) and Mary Amanda Grimes Sharp (1852–1930). He married Grace Stewart in 1910 in York, Pennsylvania and moved to Brown Township, Stephens, Oklahoma in the 1920s, before returning to Pocahontas County, West Virginia where he became Circuit Court Clerk.

== Political career and death ==
Sharp was first elected Secretary of State of West Virginia on November 4, 1924, with 52.28% of the vote. Sharp was re-elected on November 6, 1928, with 55.66%, but lost his bid for a third term on November 8, 1932, against Democratic nominee William O'Brien, receiving only 45.40% of the vote compared to O'Brien's 54.14%.

Sharp went on to serve as the chair of Pocahontas County Republican Partyfrom 1940 until 1946. He died on October 24, 1954, in Pocahontas County, West Virginia.

== See also ==
- Secretary of State of West Virginia

Party political offices
Preceded by Houston G. Young	Republican nominee for Secretary of State of West Virginia; 1924, 1928, 1932	Succeeded by Phil M. Conley
Political offices
Preceded by Houston G. Young	Secretary of State of West Virginia; 1925-1933	Succeeded by William Smith O'Brien
