= Stuart F. Reed =

American politician

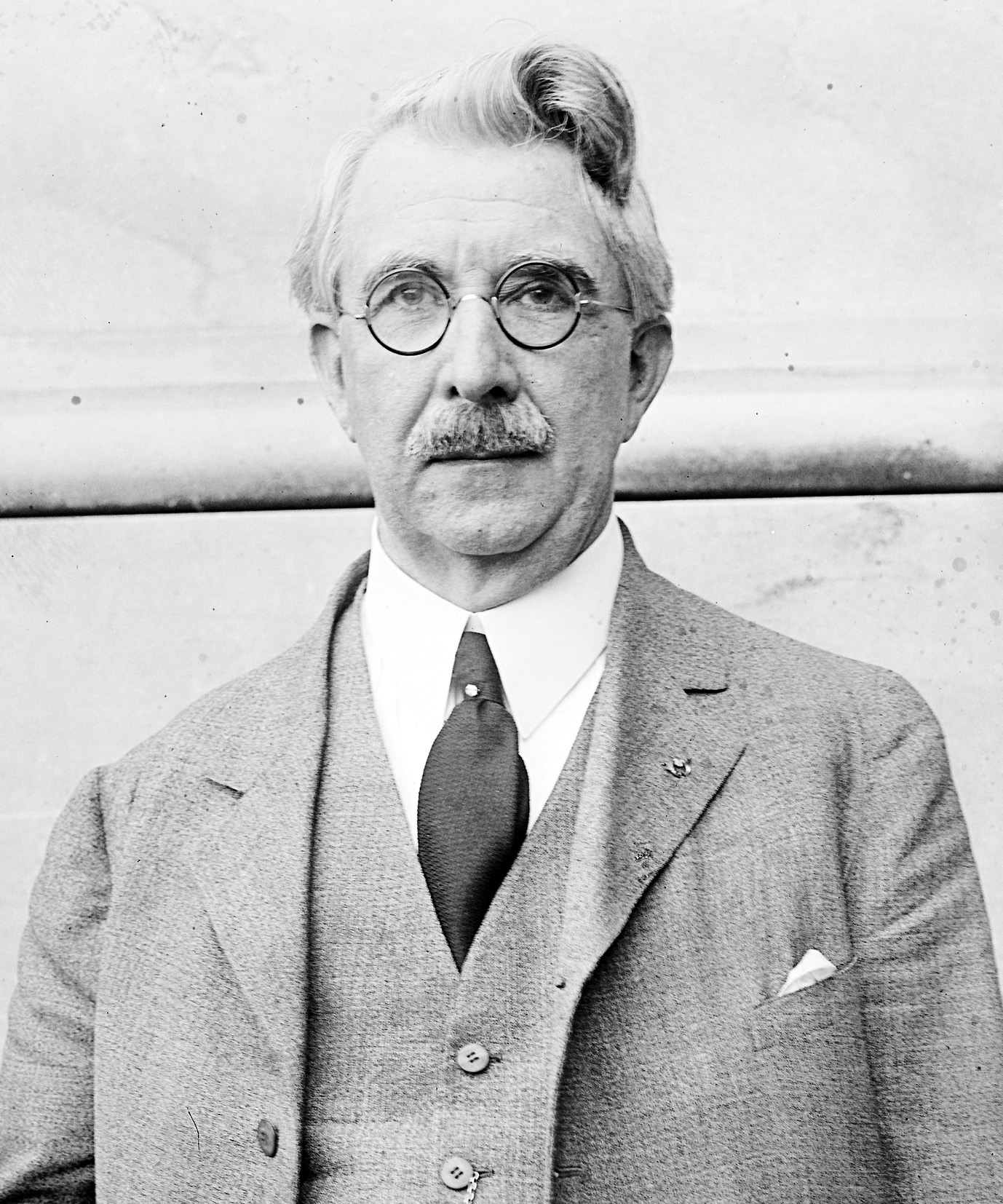

Member of the U.S. House of Representatives from West Virginia's 3rd district
- In office March 4, 1917 – March 3, 1925
- Preceded by: Adam Brown Littlepage
- Succeeded by: John M. Wolverton

14th Secretary of State of West Virginia
- In office 1909–1917
- Governor: William E. Glasscock; Henry D. Hatfield
- Preceded by: Charles Swisher
- Succeeded by: Houston G. Young

Member of the West Virginia Senate from the 3rd district
- In office 1895–1899
- Preceded by: Orlando Hardman
- Succeeded by: Anthony Smith

Personal details
- Born: Stuart Felix Reed; January 8, 1866 Barbour, West Virginia, U.S.
- Died: July 4, 1935 (aged 69) Washington, D.C., U.S.
- Party: Republican
- Spouse: Bonnie Belle Smith (m. 1898)
- Education: Fairmont State Normal School; West Virginia University

Stuart Felix Reed (January 8, 1866 – July 4, 1935) was an American lawyer and Republican politician who became the Secretary of State of West Virginia (1909–1917) and represented West Virginia's 3rd congressional district in the United States House of Representatives (1917–1925).

== Early and family life ==
Reed was born near Philippi, Barbour County, West Virginia to Margaret J. Reed and her farmer husband, Melton D. Reed. By 1880, the family also included a daughter, Orea.

Reed attended the Barbour County public schools and taught in country schools. He graduated from the Fairmont State Normal School in 1885 and from the law department of West Virginia University at Morgantown in 1889.

He married Bonnie Belle Smith (1872–1954), daughter of James and Ellen Smith of Harrison County on June 16, 1898.

== Career ==
He founded and edited the Athenaeum (college journal) in 1889 and was the editor of the Telegram in Clarksburg, West Virginia from 1890 to 1898.

Reed was a member of the West Virginia Senate from 1895 to 1899, and the postmaster of Clarksburg from 1897 to 1901. He served as the president of the board of trustees of Broaddus College from 1901 to 1908. He was a member of the International Tax Conference at Louisville, Kentucky in 1909 and the Secretary of State of West Virginia from 1909 to 1917. He also was the president of the Association of American Secretaries of State in 1915.

Voters from West Virginia's 3rd district elected him as a Republican to the Sixty-fifth and to the three succeeding Congresses (March 4, 1917 – March 3, 1925). In Congress, he served as chairman, Committee on Expenditures in the Department of Justice (Sixty-seventh Congress) and the Committee on District of Columbia (Sixty-eighth Congress). In his final term, he defeated Democrat Eskridge Morton. Reed declined to be a candidate for renomination in 1924.

== Death and legacy ==
After leaving Congress, Reed engaged in literary pursuits and changed his residence to Washington, D.C. He died there on July 4, 1935.

Party political offices
Preceded by Charles W. Swisher	Republican nominee for Secretary of State of West Virginia; 1908, 1912	Succeeded by Houston G. Young
Political offices
Preceded by Charles W. Swisher	Secretary of State of West Virginia; 1909–1917	Succeeded by Houston G. Young
U.S. House of Representatives
Preceded by Adam Brown Littlepage	Member of the U.S. House of Representatives from West Virginia's 3rd congressional district 1917–1925	Succeeded by John M. Wolverton
