= Randolph Stalnaker =

Randolph Stalnaker (born Greenbrier County, West Virginia, June 8, 1845; died Beverly, West Virginia, March 20, 1927) was an American businessman and politician who served as Secretary of State of West Virginia from 1881 to 1885.

== Early life ==
Stalnaker was the son of Randolph Stalnaker Sr. (1808-1885), a maker of saddles and harness, and his wife Caroline Erskine Zoll Stalnaker (1810-1855). His oldest brother John William Stalnaker (1831-1883) became a doctor and settled in Austin, Texas; his older brother Daniel Edwin Stalnaker (1835-1918) became a prosperous businessman in Wheeling, West Virginia.

At the onset of the Civil War he volunteered for the Confederate Army but was rejected as too young; on a second try in 1863 he was accepted and attached to the staff of General Alexander W. Reynolds in the Confederate Army of Tennessee. He was present at the Siege of Vicksburg. After the siege he returned to Virginia and was adjutant to Col. D. S. Hounshell's cavalry battalion for the remainder of the war, which saw action at Gettysburg, the second Battle of Winchester, and other battles. After the Confederate surrender, Stalnaker was paroled in Lewisburg, West Virginia in May of 1865.

== Career ==
Stalnaker was for a time reduced to farm work, but by 1868 had become a merchant in Lewisburg. Active in Democratic party politics, in 1877 he was appointed private secretary to Governor Henry M. Mathews. Mathews appointed him a major in the state militia during the Great Railroad Strike of 1877. Mathews' successor, Governor Jacob B. Jackson, appointed Mathews as Secretary of State. He was confirmed by the West Virginia Senate on March 5, 1881 and served until the end of Jackson's administration in 1885.

After his term in government he engaged in manufacturing in Wheeling and then was associated for many years with the legal department of the Baltimore and Ohio Railroad. He also served as West Virginia's representative on the Democratic National Committee. Later in life he left the Democratic party and became an independent.

== Family ==
In 1918 Stalnaker married Mabel (Burns) Baker, the widow of state senator Starke Baker (1860-1917); they had no children.

Preceded by Sobieski Brady	Secretary of State of West Virginia; 1881-1885	Succeeded by Henry S. Walker
