= John M. Wolverton =

American politician (1872–1944)

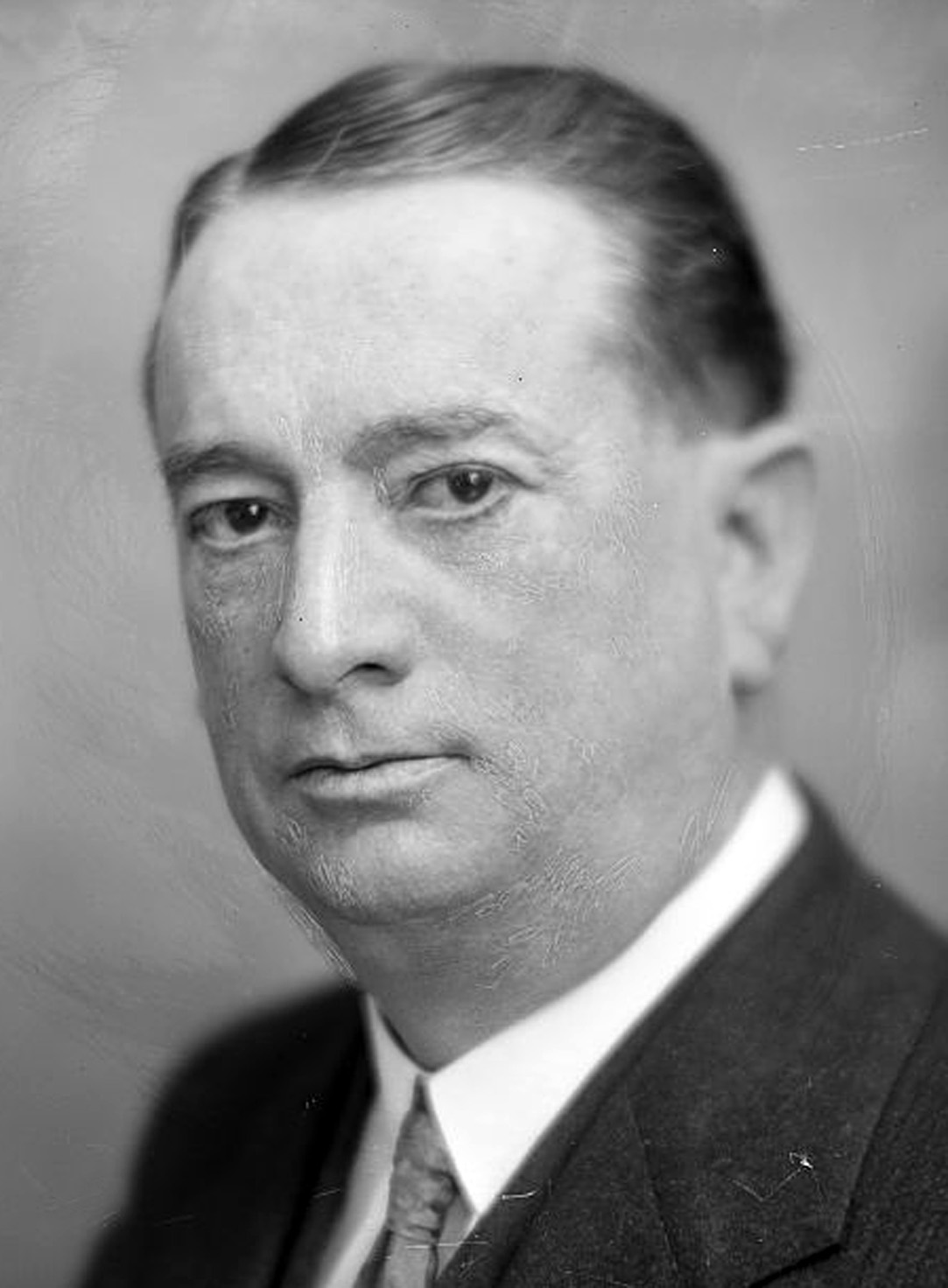
- Born: John Marshall Wolverton; 31 January 1872; Big Bend, West Virginia
- Died: August 19, 1944 (aged 72); Richwood, West Virginia
- Education: West Virginia University

John Marshall Wolverton (January 31, 1872 – August 19, 1944) was a U.S. representative from West Virginia.

Born in Big Bend, West Virginia located in Calhoun County, Wolverton attended country schools and Glenville and Fairmont State Normal Schools. He graduated from the law department of the West Virginia University at Morgantown in 1901. He was admitted to the bar the same year and commenced practice in Grantsville, West Virginia. He moved to Richwood, West Virginia in 1904, and served as mayor of Richwood in 1918 and 1919. He served as prosecuting attorney of Nicholas County, 1913 to 1917 and 1921 to 1925.

Wolverton was elected as a Republican to the Sixty-ninth Congress (March 4, 1925 – March 3, 1927). He was an unsuccessful candidate for reelection in 1926 to the Seventieth Congress.

Wolverton was elected to the Seventy-first Congress (March 4, 1929 – March 4, 1931). He was an unsuccessful candidate for reelection in 1930 to the Seventy-second Congress, and for election in 1932 to the Seventy-third Congress and in 1936 to the Seventy-fifth Congress.

He resumed the practice of law in Richwood, where he died August 19, 1944. He was interred in the Odd Fellows Cemetery.

== Sources ==
- United States Congress. "John M. Wolverton (id: W000684)". Biographical Directory of the United States Congress.

U.S. House of Representatives
Preceded by Stuart F. Reed	Member of the U.S. House of Representatives from West Virginia's 3rd congressional district 1925–1927	Succeeded by William S. O'Brien
Preceded by William S. O'Brien	Member of the U.S. House of Representatives from West Virginia's 3rd congressional district 1929–1931	Succeeded by Lynn Hornor
