= Granville D. Hall =

American politician

2nd Secretary of State of West Virginia
- In office 1865–1867
- Governor: Arthur I. Boreman
- Preceded by: Jacob Boyers
- Succeeded by: John Witcher

Personal details
- Born: Granville Davisson Hall; September 17, 1837 Shinnston, Harrison County, Virginia
- Died: June 24, 1934 (aged 96) Glencoe, Cook County, Illinois, U.S.
- Resting place: Memorial Gardens, Skokie, Illinois
- Party: Republican
- Occupation: Journalist

Granville Davisson Hall (September 17, 1837 – June 24, 1934) was an American journalist, businessman and politician who helped found the state of West Virginia during the American Civil War. He served as the Secretary of State of West Virginia and as the private secretary of the first governor, Arthur Boreman, and eventually wrote seven books, including The Rending of Virginia to counteract the growing Lost Cause myth. After the Civil War, Hall became involved in the railroad industry in Kentucky, eventually becoming President of the Louisville and Nashville Railroad, but later moved to Glencoe, Illinois where he continued writing and served as the village clerk.

== Early and family life ==
Born in Harrison County, Virginia, he received a private education, then at the age of 17, began teaching school.

== Career ==
In 1859, Hall moved to Wheeling on the Ohio River, then Virginia's second largest city. He knew stenography and took at job with the Wheeling Intelligencer. However, he returned home to Harrison County, only to return to Wheeling as Virginians were asked to vote on secession, as recommended by the Virginia Secession Convention of 1861. His published articles about the Wheeling Convention, later republished as "The Rending of Virginia" are now the only available accounts of those deliberations, as the minutes taken by the three official reporters were lost in a subsequent flood of the Ohio River. In 1863, Hall became the first official clerk of the West Virginia House of Delegates, and in 1865 he became the first Secretary of State of West Virginia, as well as working as secretary to governor Arthur Boreman.

After accepting a job with a railroad company, Hall left West Virginia for Kentucky, and eventually became President of the Louisville and Nashville Railroad, which was consolidated by Chicago financiers and had lines from Ohio to Florida. However, by the early 20th century it was acquired by financiers led by J.P. Morgan and merged into the Atlantic Coast Line.

By this time, Hall had moved to Glencoe, Illinois and begun raising a family, as well as served as the village clerk for decades. He also published articles in Chicago newspapers and wrote books. He published Daughter of the Elm: A tale of Western Virginia before the War (1899), then The Rending of Virginia (1902), Lee's Invasion of Northwest Virginia (1911) and Two Virginias: genesis of old and new (1915).

== Death and legacy ==
Hall died at his Glencoe home and was buried at Memorial Gardens in nearby Skokie, Illinois. Some of his papers, including those relating to the Wheeling Convention, are held by the West Virginia Regional History Center.
