= James R. McCartney =

American politician

24th Secretary of State of West Virginia
- In office March 19, 1975 – January 17, 1977
- Governor: Arch A. Moore Jr.
- Preceded by: Hike Heiskell
- Succeeded by: A. James Manchin

Personal details
- Born: James Rowe McCartney; April 7, 1920 Meyersdale, Pennsylvania
- Died: February 22, 2011 (aged 90) Morgantown, West Virginia
- Party: Republican
- Spouse: Mary Kathryn Amos
- Children: 5
- Education: West Virginia University (AB)

Military service
- Allegiance: United States
- Branch/service: United States Army
- Years of service: 1942–1946
- Rank: Major
- Unit: 2nd Armored Division
- Battles/wars: World War II; European theater
- Awards: Silver Star (2); Purple Heart; Croix de Guerre (France)

James Rowe McCartney (April 7, 1920 – February 22, 2011) was the Secretary of State of West Virginia from 1975 until 1977. He was a highly decorated World War II United States Army veteran, receiving two Silver Stars, the Purple Heart, Presidential Unit Citation, French Croix de Guerre, and Belgian Fougerre. McCartney graduated from West Virginia University and served on several state commissions including the West Virginia Ethics Commission.

== Notes ==
Party political offices
Preceded by Hike Heiskell	Republican nominee for Secretary of State of West Virginia; 1976	Succeeded by Dee Brown
Political offices
Preceded by Edgar F. Heiskell III	Secretary of State of West Virginia; 1975–1977	Succeeded by A. James Manchin
