= Daniel Pitt O'Brien =

American politician (1900–1957)

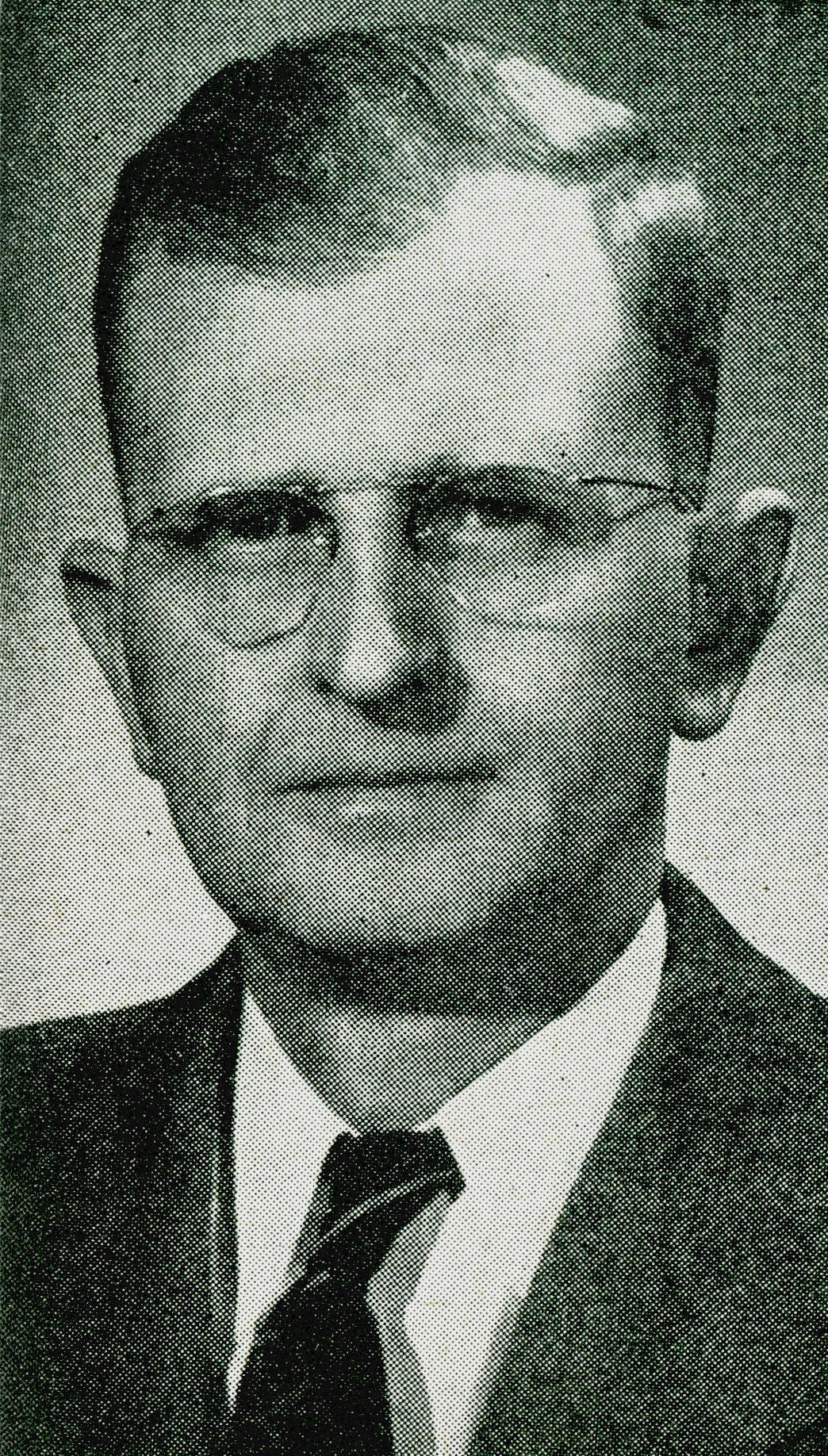
O'Brien in 1951

Daniel Pitt O'Brien (August 31, 1900 – November 29, 1957) was Secretary of State of West Virginia from 1948 to 1957.

== Biography ==
O'Brien was born in Buckhannon, West Virginia. His father was judge and politician William S. O'Brien and his mother Emma (White) O'Brien.

After military service during World War I, he studied at West Virginia Wesleyan College and graduated with a B.S. He worked as a high school teacher and athletic coach 1925–33 and as Chief Clerk in the office of the Secretary of State of West Virginia 1933–48, excepting service in the armed forces during World War II. In 1942, he married Mildred Elizabeth Smith and they had a daughter, Patricia.

O'Brien sought the Democratic nomination to succeed his father as Secretary of State and won the primary election in May 1948, but his father died August 10, which led to his appointment by Governor Clarence Meadows to fill the unexpired term. On November 2, 1948, he was elected Secretary of State for a full term. He was reelected in 1952 and 1956, but did not complete his last term, since he suffered from sudden death November 29, 1957, just as his father before him.

Party political offices
Preceded by William S. O'Brien	Democratic nominee for Secretary of State of West Virginia; 1948, 1952, 1956	Succeeded by Joe F. Burdett
Political offices
Preceded by William S. O'Brien	Secretary of State of West Virginia; 1948–1957	Succeeded by Helen F. Holt
