= Hike Heiskell =

American politician (1940–2016)

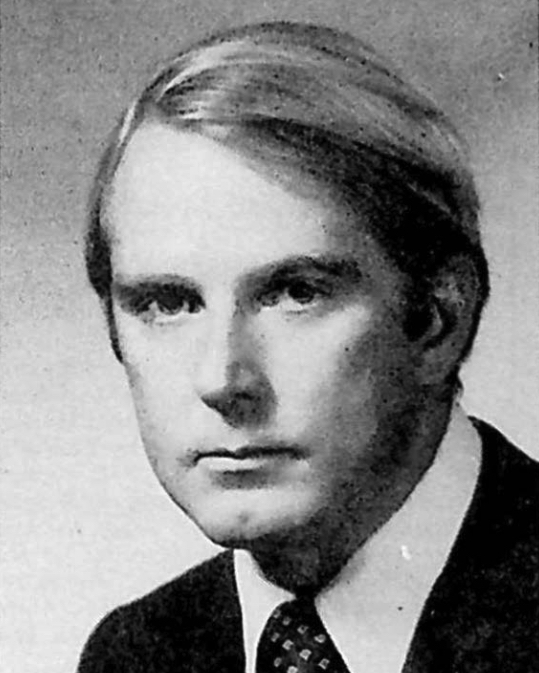
- Official portrait, 1973

Chair of the West Virginia Republican Party
- In office August 1987 – July 14, 1990
- Preceded by: John Raese
- Succeeded by: David McKinley

23rd Secretary of State of West Virginia
- In office January 15, 1973 – March 3, 1975
- Governor: Arch A. Moore Jr.
- Preceded by: Jay Rockefeller
- Succeeded by: James R. McCartney

Personal details
- Born: Edgar Frank Heiskell III; October 10, 1940 Morgantown, West Virginia, United States
- Died: November 20, 2016 (aged 76) Charleston, West Virginia, United States
- Party: Republican (until 2006); Independent (2006–2016)
- Spouse: Jeraldine Frances McGrath (m. 1966; div. 1996)
- Children: 5
- Education: West Virginia University (AB); University of Virginia (JD)

Military service
- Branch/service: United States Air Force
- Years of service: 1966–1970

Edgar Frank "Hike" Heiskell III (October 10, 1940 – November 20, 2016) was an American lawyer and politician.

== Biography ==
Heiskell was born in Morgantown, West Virginia and graduated from Morgantown High School. He received his bachelor's degree from West Virginia University in 1963 and his Juris Doctor degree from the University of Virginia School of Law in 1966. Heiskell served in the United States Air Force. He then practiced law.

In 1972, Heiskell won election as a Republican to serve as West Virginia Secretary of State, narrowly defeating Democratic nominee Thomas A. Winner. He served from 1973 until his resignation in March 1975. He served as chair of the West Virginia Republican Party from 1987 to 1990, though he later left the party, becoming an independent in 2006.

He died in Charleston, West Virginia from cancer.

Political offices
Preceded by Jay Rockefeller	Secretary of State of West Virginia; 1973–1975	Succeeded by James R. McCartney
Party political offices
Preceded by John S. Callebs	Republican nominee for Secretary of State of West Virginia; 1972	Succeeded by James R. McCartney
Preceded by John Raese	Chair of the West Virginia Republican Party; 1987–1990	Succeeded by David McKinley
