= Helen K. Holt =

American physicist

Helen Keil Holt
- Born: 1937; West Palm Beach, Florida, U.S.
- Died: September 29, 2016 (aged 78–79); Silver Spring, Maryland, U.S.
- Education: Barnard College (B.A.); Yale University (Ph.D.)
- Known for: Research on gas lasers and quantum metrology
- Spouse: Lawrence Holt
- Awards: Fellow of the American Physical Society (1977)
- Scientific career
- Fields: Physics
- Workplaces: National Bureau of Standards
- Thesis: The excitation of the 21S, 23S, and 23P states of helium by electron bombardment (1966)
- Doctoral advisor: Vernon W. Hughes

Helen Keil Holt (1937 – September 29, 2016) was an American physicist at the National Bureau of Standards, known for her research on gas lasers and quantum metrology.

== Life ==
Helen Keil was born in West Palm Beach, Florida in 1937. As a youth she competed in Florida junior championships in tennis, and was nationally ranked as a tennis player. She became a physics student at Barnard College, as well as competing in tennis for Barnard, and graduated in 1958. She married Lawrence Holt, changing her name to Holt; her husband was originally from Żarów (then in Germany, now part of Poland), had come to the US in 1939 as a young child with his family to escape the Nazis, and was a US Navy aircraft and helicopter pilot who later became a management scientist and systems analyst for the US Post Office.

Although winning a graduate fellowship to study at the University of California, Berkeley, she did her doctoral studies in physics at Yale University, staying closer to her husband who was completing an M.B.A. at Columbia University. She completed her Ph.D. at Yale in 1966 under the supervision of Vernon W. Hughes. Her dissertation was The excitation of the 2^{1}S, 2^{3}S, and 2^{3}P states of helium by electron bombardment.

After completing her doctorate, she became a researcher at the National Bureau of Standards, where she remained for the rest of her career until taking early retirement in 1986. After retiring, she and her husband moved from Bethesda, Maryland to Silver Spring, Maryland. She died on September 29, 2016.

== Recognition ==
Holt was named a Fellow of the American Physical Society (APS) in 1977, after a nomination from the APS Division of Atomic, Molecular and Optical Physics.
