= William S. O'Brien (American politician) =

American politician

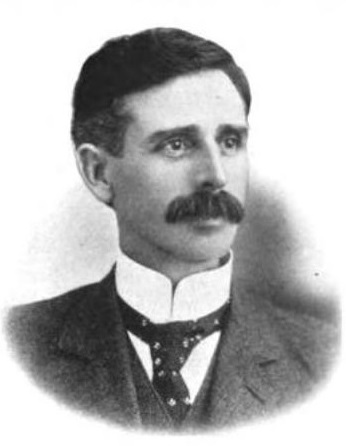
From Volume I of 1903's Men of West Virginia

William Smith O'Brien (January 8, 1862 – August 10, 1948) was a lawyer and Democratic politician from West Virginia who served as a United States representative from 1927 to 1929.

== Biography ==
O'Brien was born in Audra, near Philippi in Barbour County, Virginia (now West Virginia). He attended the common schools, the Weston Academy, and the West Virginia University at Morgantown. He worked as a laborer on farms, in brick yards, and on public works. He also taught school and worked as an editor. He graduated from the law school of the University of West Virginia at Morgantown in 1891. He was admitted to the bar the same year and commenced the practice of law in Buckhannon, West Virginia in Upshur County in 1892.

O'Brien served as a captain in the West Virginia National Guard in 1894 and 1895. He served as judge on the twelfth judicial circuit court of West Virginia from 1913 to 1919. In 1926, he was elected as a Democrat to the 70th United States Congress (March 4, 1927 – March 3, 1929). He was an unsuccessful candidate for re-election in 1928 to the Seventy-first Congress and resumed the practice of law. He was elected to four successive terms as Secretary of State of West Virginia starting in 1932. He served as West Virginia Secretary of State until his death in Buckhannon, West Virginia in 1948 and was buried at Heavner Cemetery.

== Sources ==
- United States Congress. "William S. O'Brien (id: O000018)". Biographical Directory of the United States Congress.

Party political offices
| Preceded by Mrs. William Campbell | Democratic nominee for Secretary of State of West Virginia; 1932, 1936, 1940, 1944 | Succeeded by Daniel Pitt O'Brien |
U.S. House of Representatives
| Preceded by John M. Wolverton | Member of the U.S. House of Representatives from West Virginia's 3rd congressional district 1927–1929 | Succeeded by John M. Wolverton |
Political offices
| Preceded by George W. Sharp | Secretary of State of West Virginia; 1933–1948 | Succeeded by Daniel Pitt O'Brien |
