= Rush Holt Sr. =

American politician (1905–1955)

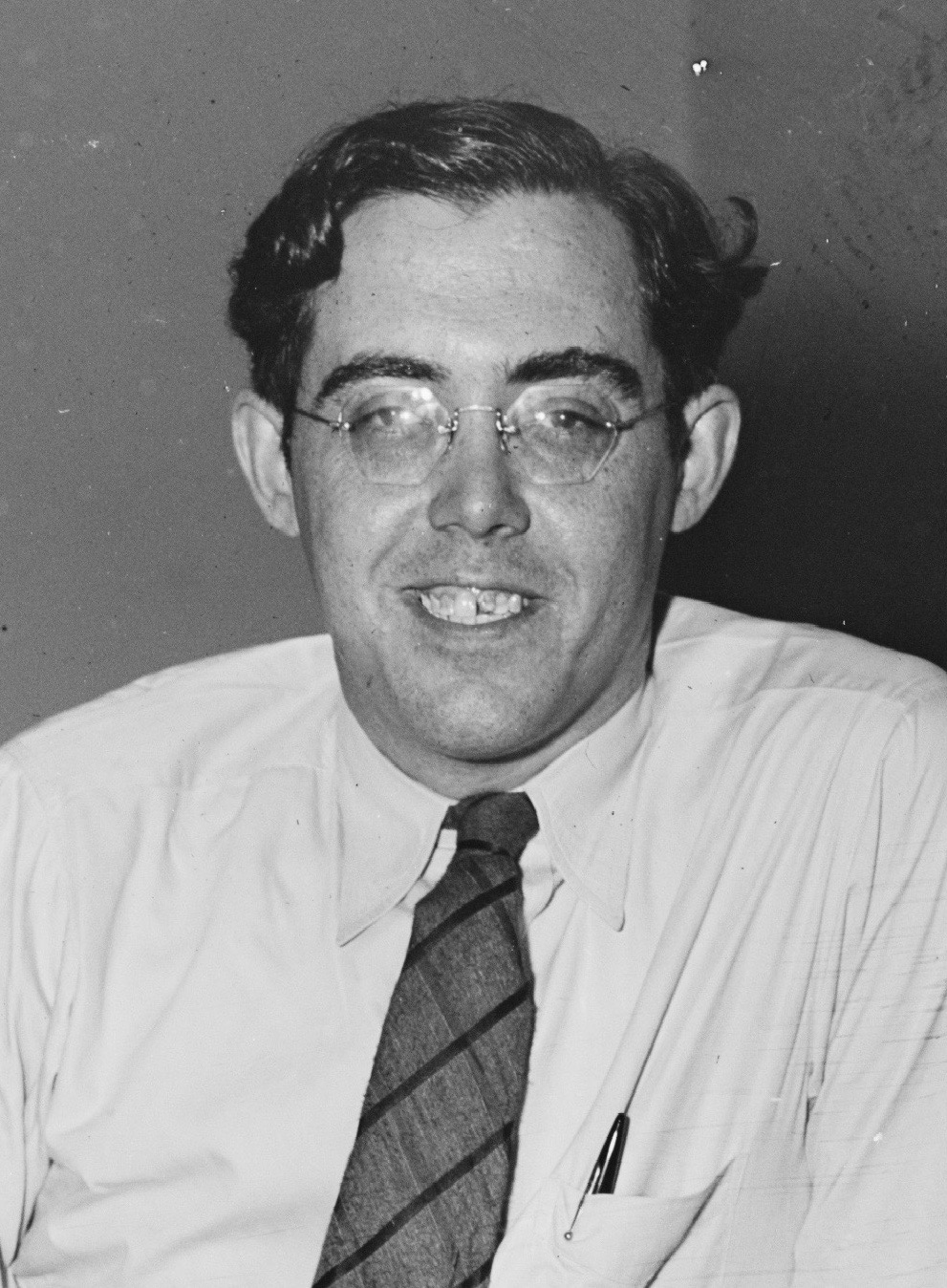
- Holt in 1935

United States Senator from West Virginia
- In office June 21, 1935 – January 3, 1941
- Preceded by: Henry D. Hatfield
- Succeeded by: Harley M. Kilgore

Member of the West Virginia House of Delegates
- In office 1954–1955
- In office 1942–1950
- In office 1931–1935

Personal details
- Born: Rush Dew Holt; June 19, 1905 Weston, West Virginia, U.S.
- Died: February 8, 1955 (aged 49) Bethesda, Maryland, U.S.
- Party: Republican (1949–1955)
- Other political affiliations: Democratic (until 1949)
- Spouse: Helen Froelich (m. 1941)
- Children: Rush Holt Jr.
- Profession: Teacher

Rush Dew Holt Sr. (June 19, 1905 – February 8, 1955) was an American politician who was a United States senator from West Virginia (1935–1941) and a member of the West Virginia House of Delegates (1931–1935, 1942–1950, 1954–1955).

== Early life and family ==
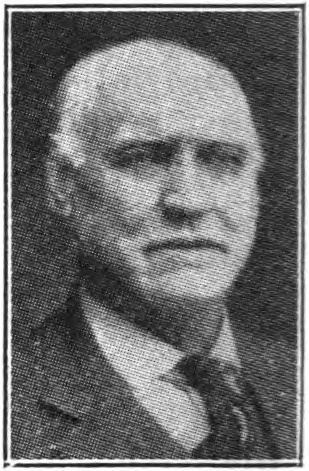
Holt's father Matthew in a 1928 Socialist Party publication

Holt was born in Weston, Lewis County, West Virginia, on June 19, 1905. His parents were Chilela (née Dew) and Dr. Matthew Samuel Holt, a small-town physician and horse trader. Matthew Holt was an atheist, who shifted his political support from the Republican Party to William Jennings Bryan in the 1890s, and then to Socialist candidate Eugene Debs; Matthew Holt attended the Socialist Party's 1917 convention, where he participated in condemning American involvement in World War I.

Rush Holt attended the public schools and West Virginia University at Morgantown; he graduated from Salem College in 1924. He became a high school teacher and athletic coach, then an instructor at Salem College.

== Political career ==
Holt was elected as a Democrat to the West Virginia House of Delegates, serving from 1931 to 1935. In this office, he was described as "a champion of the common man and a critic of privately owned utility corporations."

In November 1934, at 29, he was elected to the United States Senate, but because a Senator is constitutionally required to be at least 30 years old, he could not take his seat until after his 30th birthday in June 1935. Holt was the youngest person ever popularly elected to the U.S. Senate.

Holt was elected with the support of the United Mine Workers and the endorsement of Democratic West Virginia Senator Matthew M. Neely. Holt proclaimed himself an unequivocal supporter of President Franklin Delano Roosevelt, but according to William E. Coffey, "most knowledgeable observers ... viewed Holt as politically left of the president." However, by 1936, Holt emerged as a vocal conservative critic of the New Deal, attacking, for example, the Works Progress Administration as corrupt and inefficient. One scoring method found Holt to be the third most conservative Democratic Senator to serve between 1937 and 2002.

Throughout his Senate career, Holt was a staunch isolationist. He was impressed by the findings of the Nye Committee (1934–1936) and by H. C. Engelbrecht's and F. C. Hanighen's book, Merchants of Death (1934). Holt began making a number of public appearances in support of antiwar causes, including several radio addresses for the National Council for Prevention of War. He supported the Neutrality Acts of 1935, 1936, and 1937, and also every amendment aimed at making those acts more stringent. During the Spanish Civil War, Holt declared himself in favor of "strict, mandatory neutrality." He opposed increases in military spending, threatening to filibuster the 1938 Naval Expansion Bill. Holt did not favor American participation in international organizations, voting against World Court membership, and not supporting membership in the League of Nations. He opposed reciprocal trade agreements and "faithfully represented" West Virginia's pro-tariff glass industry. During the Winter War, despite being sympathetic to Finland, Holt voted against a loan to that country. Holt opposed the Selective Training and Service Act of 1940 (also known as the Burke-Wadsworth Act), which instigated peace-time conscription, actively participating in the long (six weeks) and often vitriolic debate on the act; the act eventually passed, 58–31, Holt voting against.

These activities did not make Holt popular with his constituents; in his 1940 bid for renomination, Holt came in third. After his Senate term expired, on January 3, 1941, Holt continued living in Washington, D.C., supporting himself as a lecturer and author. He was an active antiwar lecturer, most often supported by the sponsorship of the America First Committee. He attended dozens of antiwar rallies across the United States, usually as the featured speaker. This speaking tour ended after the attack on Pearl Harbor, and the America First Committee was dissolved. Holt's foreign policy views remained the same, writing in 1942: "Our fight is not over. We must stand guard to see that the internationalists ... are not allowed to determine the future of our great country. They would commit us to everlasting wars everywhere."

Holt's reputation was damaged after his links to Nazi agent George Sylvester Viereck were uncovered. He had knowingly tried to publish two isolationist books Who's Who Among the Warmongers and The British Network viay Flanders Hall, a small company with ties to registered Nazi agents. In an investigation of Viereck's links to Congress, Holt was singled out as one of four who'd knowingly collaborated with Viereck.

Holt received a high level of media attention during his Senate years and was the subject of hundreds of political cartoons from across America.

Holt unsuccessfully sought the Democratic gubernatorial nomination in 1944 and the Democratic nomination for United States Senator in 1948. He switched to the Republican Party in 1949, and was an unsuccessful Republican candidate for election to the Eighty-second Congress in 1950. In 1952, Holt again ran for governor, and earned 48% of the vote. In 1954, he was elected to the West Virginia House of Delegates. He was admitted to the National Institutes of Health's federal research clinic in Bethesda, Maryland, on January 4, 1955, suffering from reticulum cell sarcoma, a rare form of non-Hodgkin lymphoma. He died there while in office on February 8, 1955, at the age of 49. He was interred in Macpelah Cemetery in Weston, West Virginia.

== Family ==
Holt's widow, Helen F. Holt (1913–2015), filled Holt's unexpired term in the West Virginia House of Delegates (1955–1957). She was then appointed Secretary of State, serving from 1957 to 1959, becoming the first woman to hold high office in West Virginia.

His son, Rush D. Holt Jr., later served as a U.S. Representative from New Jersey.

== Bibliography ==
- "Unsworn Senators", Time, January 14, 1935. Article about Holt and Richard C. Hunter.

U.S. Senate
Preceded by Henry D. Hatfield	U.S. senator (Class 1) from West Virginia; June 21, 1935 – January 3, 1941; Served alongside: Matthew M. Neely	Succeeded by Harley M. Kilgore
Party political offices
Preceded by Matthew M. Neely	Democratic nominee for U.S. Senator from West Virginia (Class 1); 1934	Succeeded by Harley M. Kilgore
Preceded by Herbert S. Boreman	Republican nominee for Governor of West Virginia; 1952	Succeeded by Cecil H. Underwood
