= Charles W. Swisher =

Charles Wesley Swisher (born Winfield, West Virginia, May 26, 1867; died Washington, D.C., April 9, 1927) was an American businessman and politician. He served as the thirteenth Secretary of State of West Virginia from 1905 to 1909.

== Early life ==
Swisher was the son of farmer and lumberman Alpheus Swisher (1826–1901) and his wife Abigail Van Gilder Swisher (1833–1903). His first job outside the farm was as a mule driver at a coal mine; mine operators recognized his potential and promoted him so that in 1889-1892 he served as a mine superintendent. He then became a dealer in real estate and a businessman, having interests in the Fairmont & Clarksburg Electric Railroad, the Fairmont Savings Bank, the Charleston & Kanawha Water & Light Company, and other enterprises.

== Political career ==
A Republican like his father before him, Swisher started his political career as a city councilor in Fairmont, West Virginia. In 1899 he was elected to the West Virginia House of Delegates and in 1903 to the West Virginia Senate. In 1905 he was elected Secretary of State, serving until 1909. In 1908 he was a candidate for the Republican nomination for governor, but after a confused and contentious process led to no clear nominee even after an attempt to mediate by national party figures, Swisher and State Auditor Arnold Scherr dropped out in favor of William E. Glasscock.

== Private life ==
Swisher married Edith DeVault (1874–1940) in 1891; they had at least four children - Helen Abigail Swisher Palmer (1893–1970), Lawrence Swisher (1898–1905), Charles Harold Swisher (1901–1964), and Sara Edith Swisher Davis. Swisher is buried in Woodlawn Cemetery in Fairmont.
