= Secretary of State of West Virginia =

Elected office, West Virginia state government

- The Great Seal of the State of West Virginia
- Incumbent; Kris Warner since January 13, 2025
- Style: The Honorable
- Seat: West Virginia State Capitol, West Virginia Capitol Complex; Charleston, West Virginia
- Term length: Four years, no term limit
- Inaugural holder: Jacob Edgar Boyers
- Formation: June 20, 1863
- Deputy: Chuck Flannery
- Salary: $95,000

The secretary of state of West Virginia is an elected office within the U.S. state of West Virginia state government. The secretary of state is responsible for overseeing the state's election process, including voter registration and election results reporting.

The current secretary of state is Republican Kris Warner.

== Elections ==
The Office of Secretary of State is a publicly elected statewide position with elections held every four years. Elections are held in November and officers assume their duties the following January. There are no term limits for the office.

If the office of secretary of state becomes vacant, it is the duty of the governor to fill the position by appointment. The appointee serves until a new commissioner is elected.

Qualifications for being elected to the office are that one is a citizen entitled to vote, who has been a resident of West Virginia for at least the preceding 5 years.

== Duties ==
The West Virginia secretary of state is the smallest constitutional office in the state – physically, fiscally, and in terms of the number of staff. The duties of the office, though, are extensive. The primary responsibility of the secretary is to serve as the chief election officer. The "work horse" of the office is the business and licensing division, which registers, licenses, and keeps a database of all businesses, corporations, charities, notaries public, private investigators, and sports agents operating within West Virginia. The secretary also files public notices of all state agency meetings, sends official documents on behalf of the governor, and certifies gubernatorial proclamations by affixing the state seal and their signature to official documents.

== Organization ==
The Secretary of State's Office is organized as follows:

- The Administrative Law Division is the official archive and clearinghouse for agency rules, notices, orders, decisions and other procedural documents. This division publishes the state's gazette, the West Virginia Register.
- The Business Organizations Division charters and maintains records for business entities and registers trademarks and service marks. This division also licenses lending institutions and purchasers of future payments.
- The Charities Division registers and regulates charitable organizations and professional fundraisers operating within the state.
- The Elections Division administers elections, implements state and federal election laws, and regulates campaign finance.
- The Executive Records Division maintains the records of official acts of the Governor, enrolled bills, surety bonds, oaths of office of state officials, as well as the records of some state agencies.
- The Notary Public Section licenses and monitors notaries public.
- The UCC Section files liens pursuant to the Uniform Commercial Code.

The secretary of state also serves as registered agents for service of process for certain types of defendants in lawsuits.

== List of West Virginia secretaries of state ==
Below is a list of West Virginia's secretaries of state since 1863:

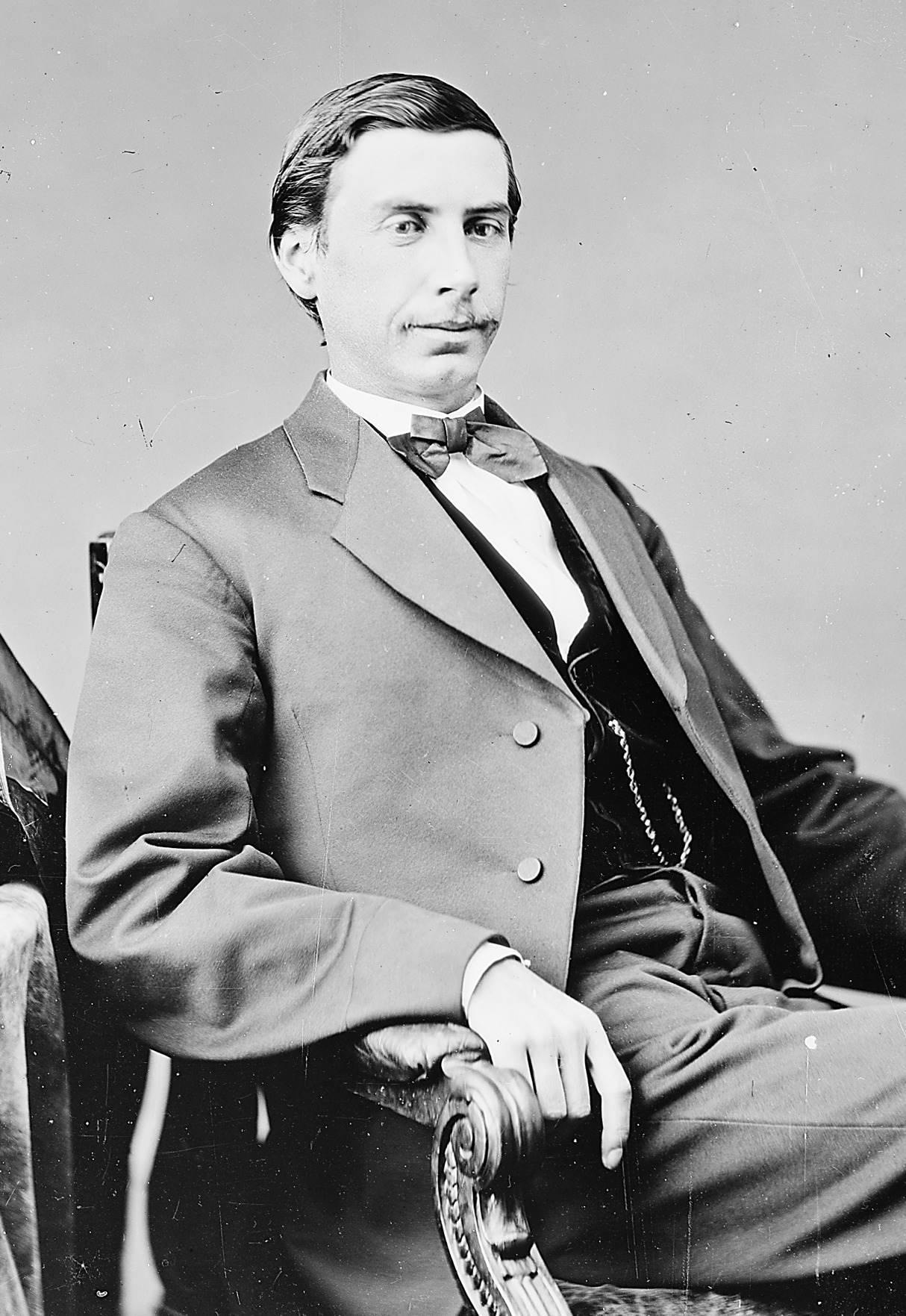
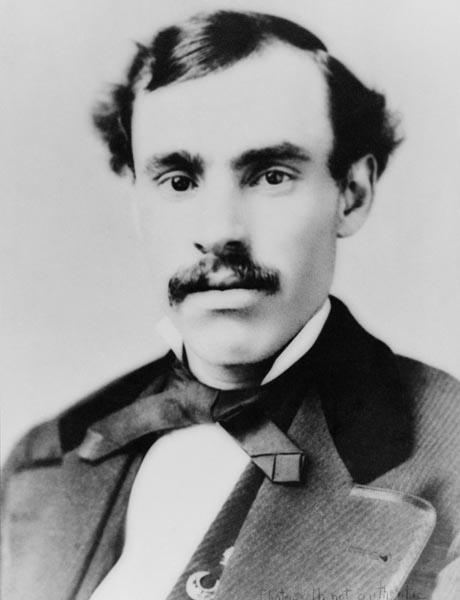
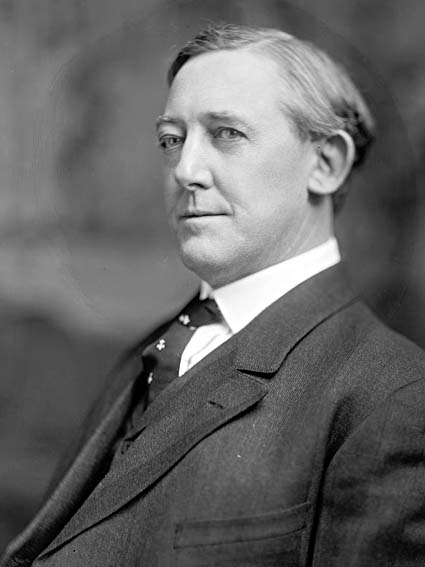
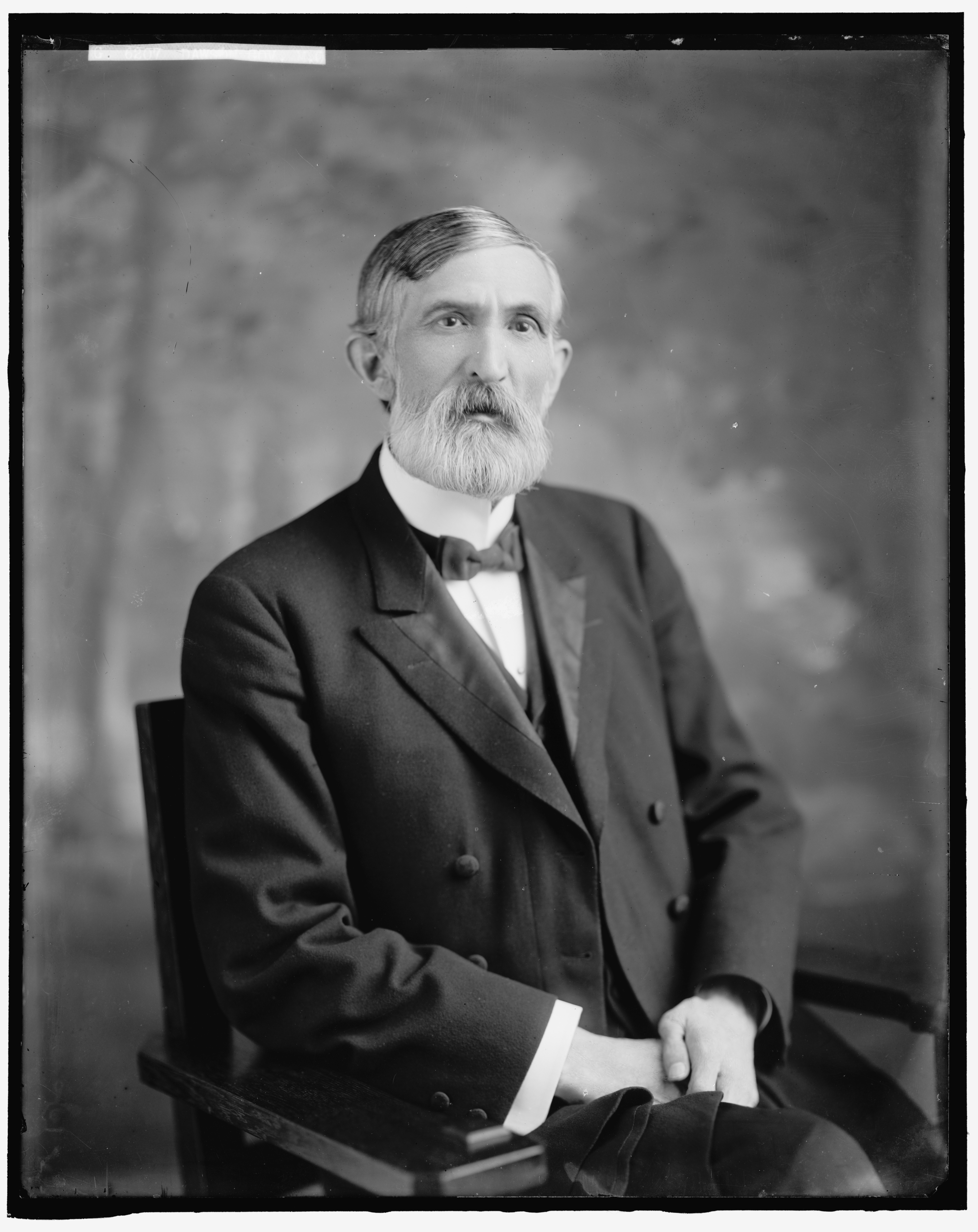
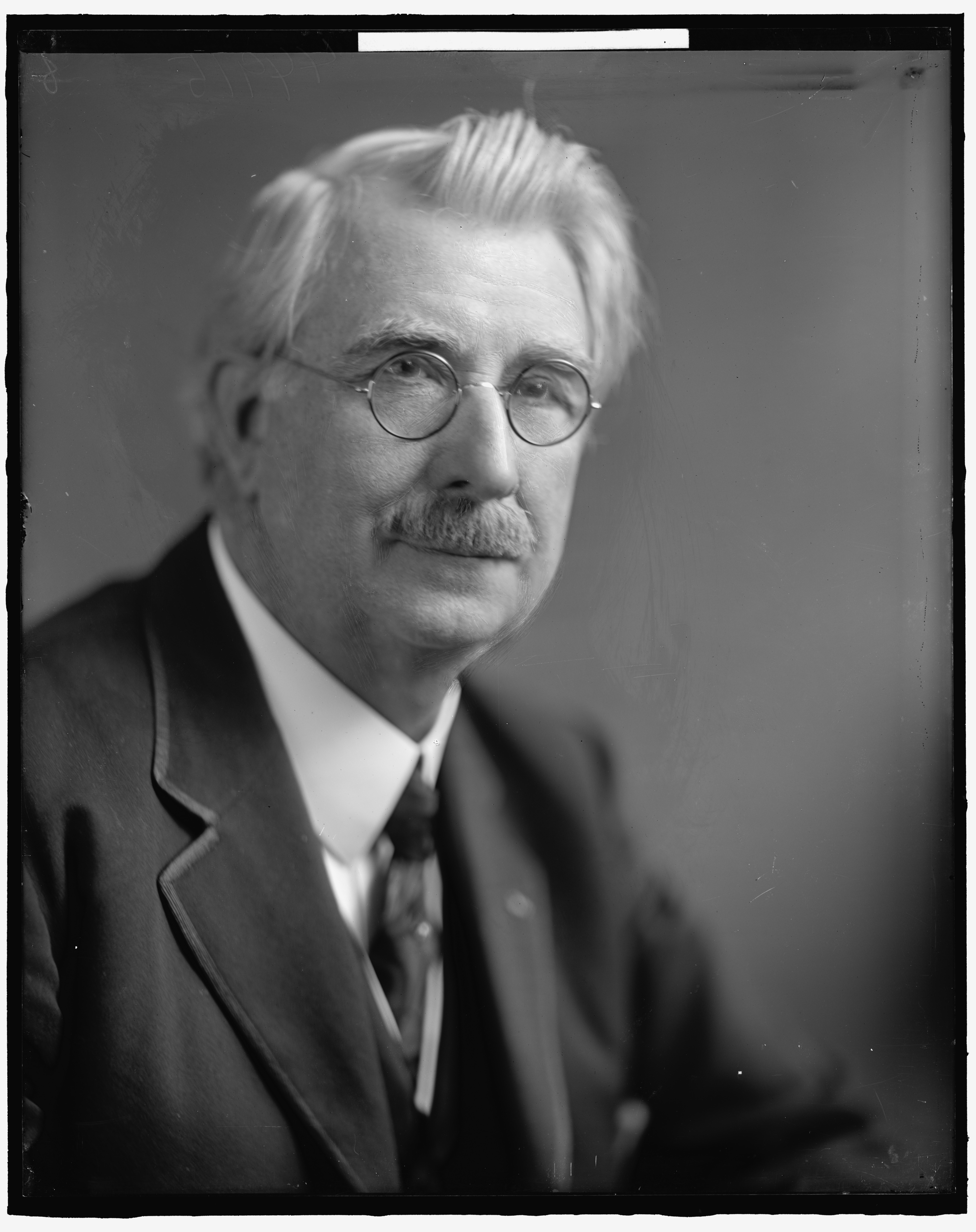
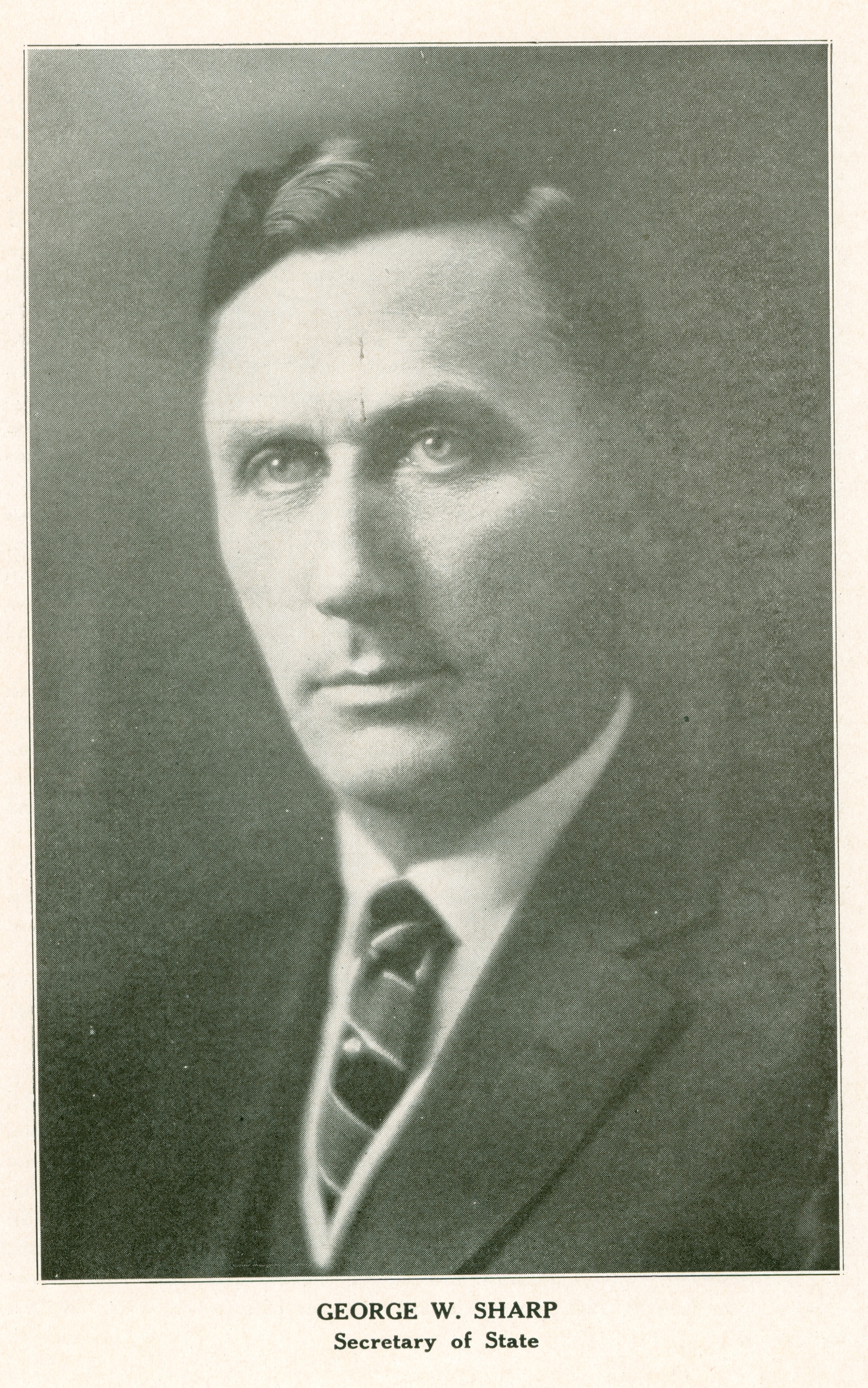
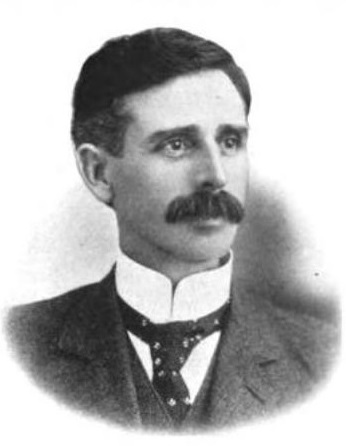
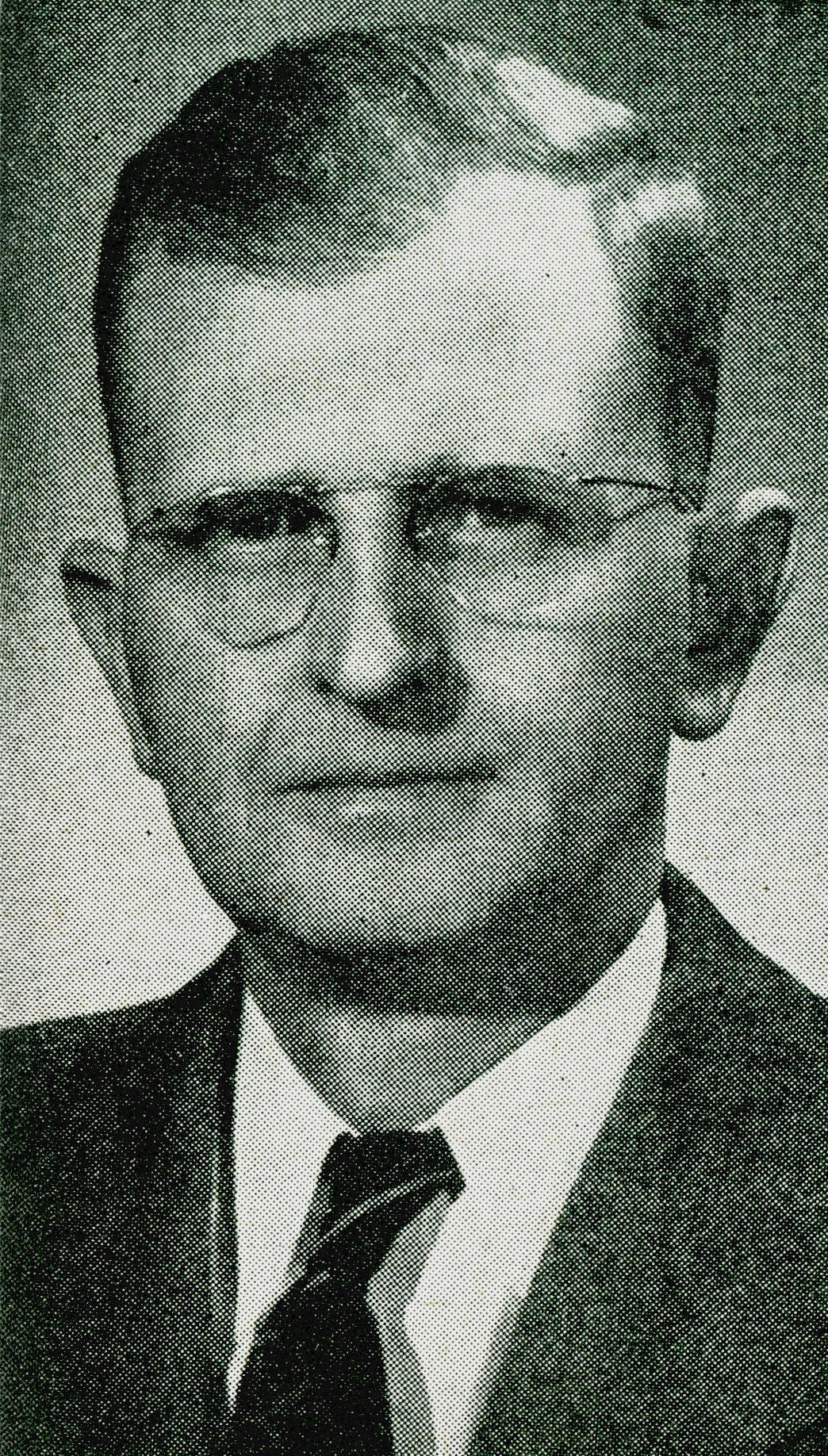
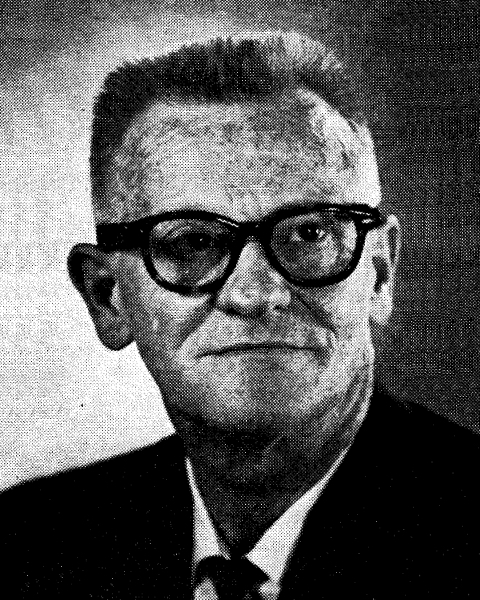
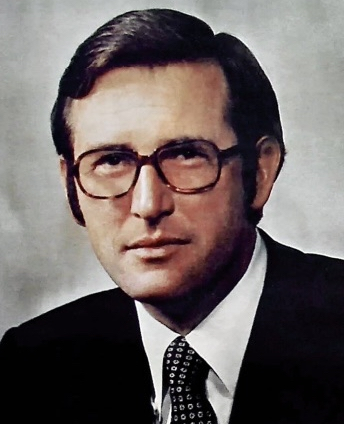
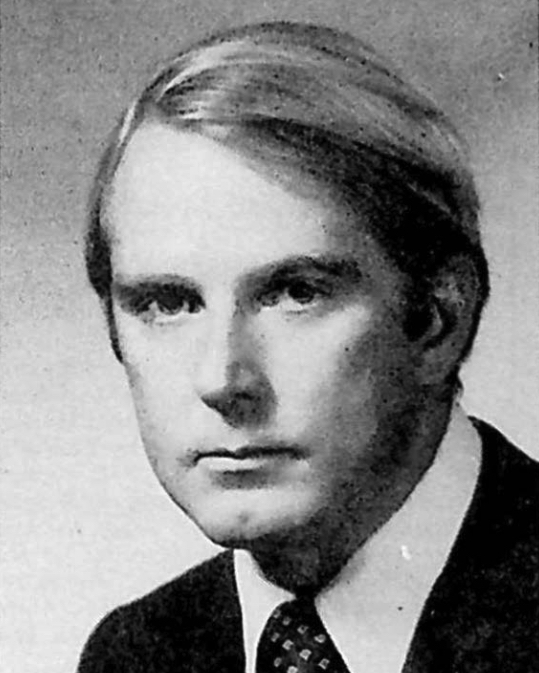
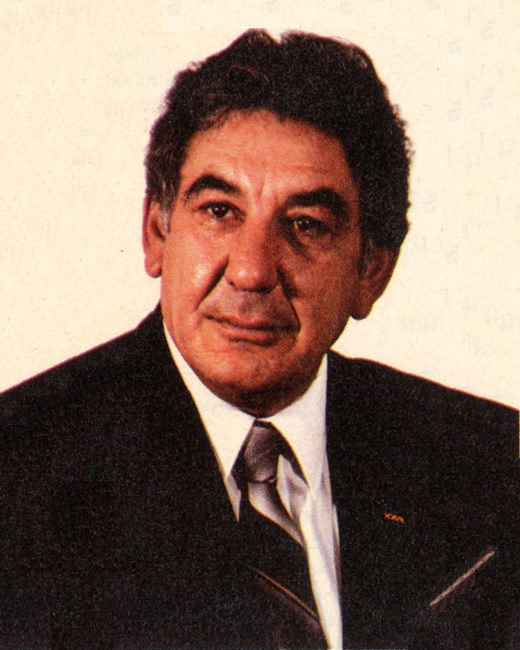
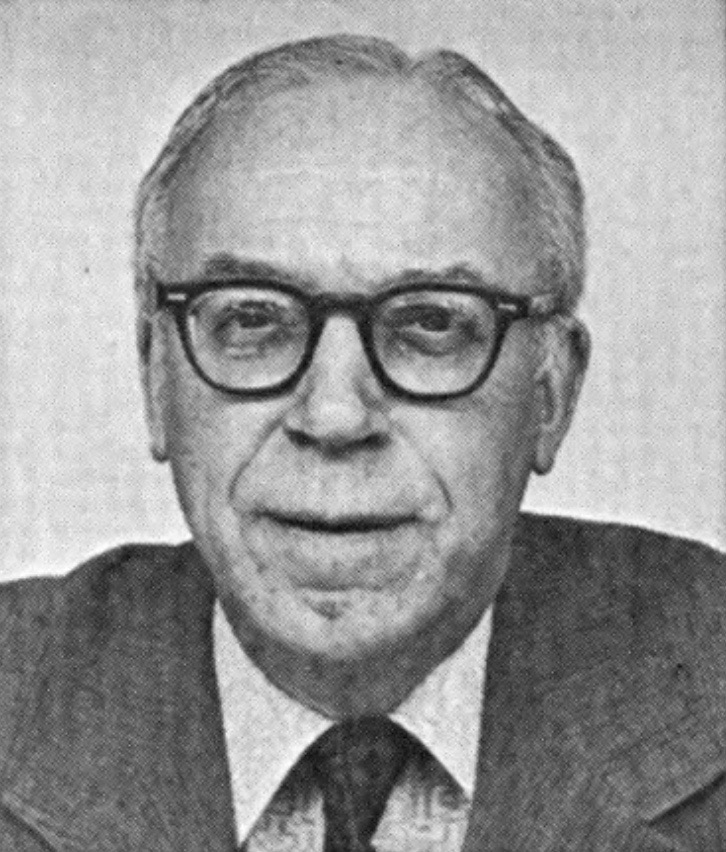
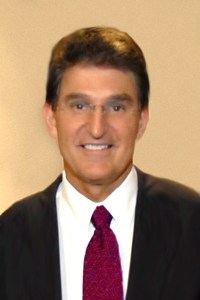
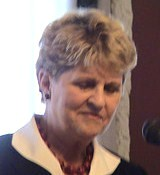
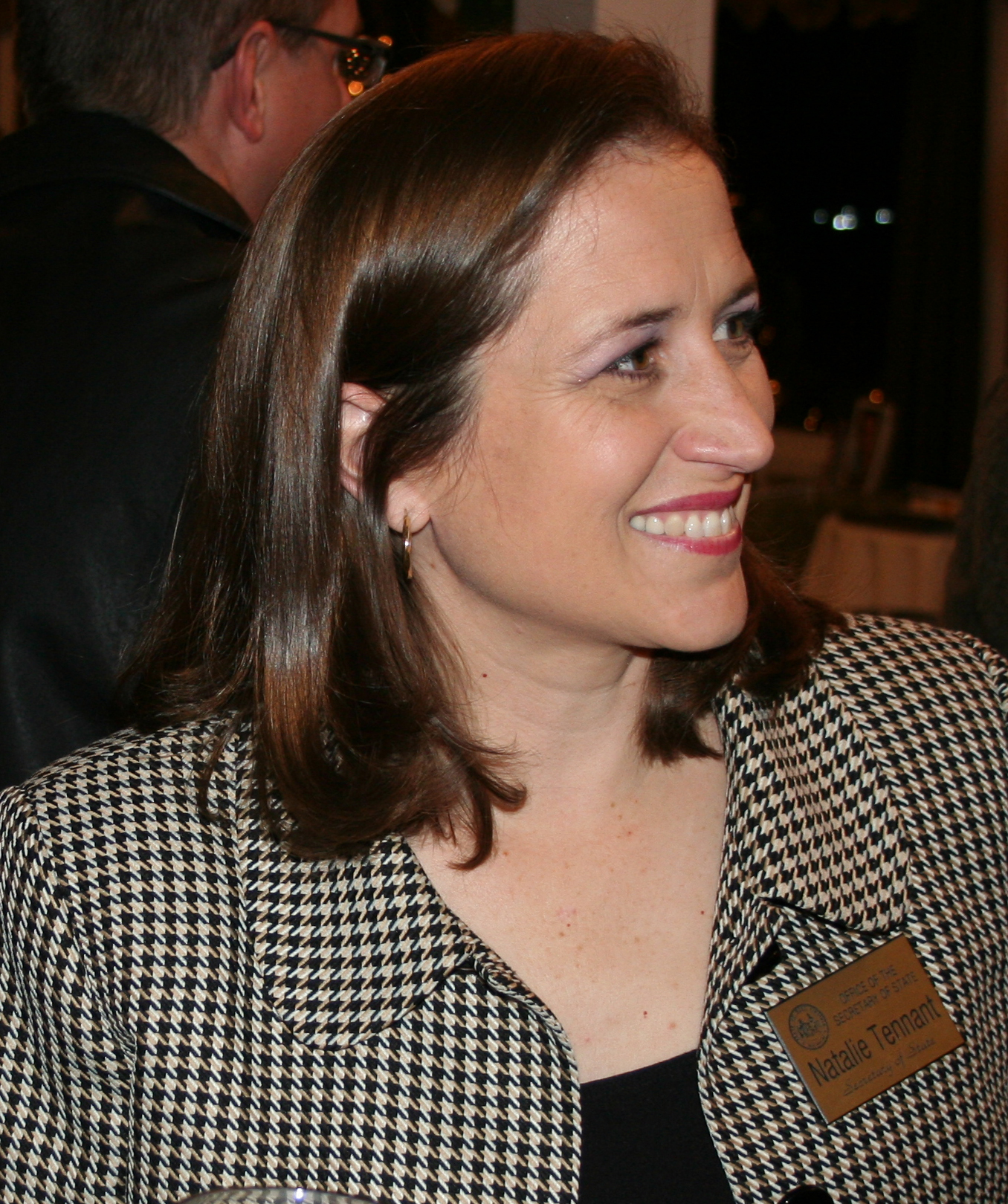
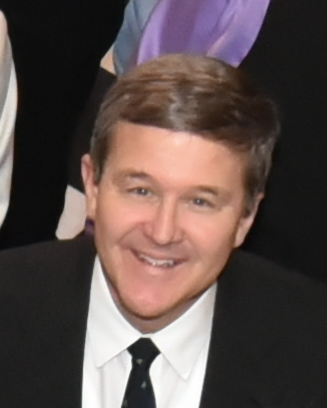
Image	Name	Party	Term
	Jacob Boyers	Republican	1863–1865
	Granville D. Hall	Republican	1865–1867
	John S. Witcher	Republican	1867–1869
	James M. Pipes	Republican	1869–1871
	John M. Phelps	Democratic	1871–1873
	Charles Hedrick	Democratic	1873–1877
	Sobieski Brady	Democratic	1877–1881
	Randolph Stalnaker	Democratic	1881–1885
	Henry S. Walker	Democratic	1885–1890
	William A. Ohley*	Democratic	1890–1893
	William E. Chilton	Democratic	1893–1897
	William Dawson	Republican	1897–1905
	Charles Swisher	Republican	1905–1909
	Stuart F. Reed	Republican	1909–1917
	Houston G. Young	Republican	1917–1925
	George W. Sharp	Republican	1925–1933
	William O'Brien	Democratic	1933–1948
	Daniel Pitt O'Brien*	Democratic	1948–1957
	Helen F. Holt	Republican	1957–1958
	Joe F. Burdett*	Democratic	1958–1965
	Robert Bailey	Democratic	1965–1969
	Jay Rockefeller	Democratic	1969–1973
	Hike Heiskell	Republican	1973–1975
	James R. McCartney*	Republican	1975–1977
	A. James Manchin	Democratic	1977–1985
	Ken Hechler	Democratic	1985–2001
	Joe Manchin	Democratic	2001–2005
	Betty Ireland	Republican	2005–2009
	Natalie Tennant	Democratic	2009–2017
	Mac Warner	Republican	2017–2025
	Kris Warner	Republican	2025–present

*appointed or elected to fill unexpired term

== See also ==
- List of company registers
