= Helen F. Holt =

American politician (1913-2015)

Secretary of State of West Virginia
- In office December 4, 1957 – January 19, 1959
- Governor: Cecil Underwood
- Preceded by: Daniel Pitt O'Brien
- Succeeded by: Joe F. Burdett

Member of the West Virginia House of Delegates
- In office February 17, 1955 – December 1, 1956
- Preceded by: Rush D. Holt Sr.
- Succeeded by: Louis D. Craig

Personal details
- Born: Helen Louise Froelich; August 16, 1913 Gridley, Illinois, U.S.
- Died: July 12, 2015 (aged 101) Boca Raton, Florida, U.S.
- Party: Republican
- Spouse: Rush Holt Sr. (m. 1941; died 1955)
- Children: 3
- Education: Northwestern University

Helen Louise Froelich Holt (née Froelich; August 16, 1913 – July 12, 2015) was an American scientist, educator, and politician. She served as the Secretary of State of West Virginia from 1957 to 1959 and also served in the West Virginia House of Delegates from 1955 to 1957. Holt was the first woman to hold a statewide-office in the state of West Virginia.

She later worked with the Federal Housing Administration and its successor, the Department of Housing and Urban Development, to improve long-term care facilities for the elderly.

Helen Holt was married to Senator Rush Holt Sr. from 1941 until his death in 1955 and was the mother of New Jersey U.S. Representative Rush Holt Jr.

== Early life ==
Holt was born Helen Louise Froelich on August 16, 1913 in rural Gridley, Illinois, the daughter of Gridley Mayor William E. and Edna M. (née Gingerich) Froelich. Her parents were second generation immigrants from Germany. They were especially patriotic Americans, and her father served as mayor in their small town for more than 20 years.

Holt was valedictorian of her high school and the only woman from her class who went on to college. She studied at Stephens College and the Marine Biological Laboratory before earning her bachelor's and master's degrees in zoology at Northwestern University. Holt was among just 4% of American women who completed a four-year college degree at that time.

She taught biology at the National Park College in Forest Glen Park, Maryland and Greenbrier College in Lewisburg, West Virginia. In 1940, Life magazine published a glamour shot of her in a spread about the country's prettiest school teachers. The photograph caught the attention of U.S. Senator Rush Holt, and the two were married in 1941. Following her marriage, she moved to Weston, West Virginia and became a close advisor to her husband as well as serving as an officer for the General Federation of Women's Clubs.

== Political career ==
Following Rush's death from cancer in 1955, Helen was appointed by Governor William C. Marland to fill Rush's seat in the West Virginia House of Delegates. A Republican, she served the remaining two years of his term until choosing not to stand for election and instead to run as a delegate to the Republican National Convention.

Holt continued to serve as a professor at Greenbrier until 1957 when she was appointed by Republican governor Cecil Underwood to serve as Secretary of State of West Virginia in 1957 following the death of Democrat Daniel Pitt O'Brien. Her appointment made her the first woman to hold a statewide-office in West Virginia. She was one of only 37 women to have held office nationwide at the time, while just two other states from the Appalachian region (Kentucky and Alabama) had female Secretaries of State. She served until January 1959 when she was defeated in the November 1958 general election by Democrat Joe F. Burdett.

After her defeat, Holt was appointed in 1959 to be Assistant Commissioner of Public Institutions, a position that oversaw women's prisons and nursing homes in the state. President Dwight D. Eisenhower, whom she had met while serving in the West Virginia State legislature, appointed Holt to the Federal Housing Administration as special assistant to the commissioner for a program overseeing nursing homes in 1960. In her role as special assistant, Holt helped to reform long-term care facilities and provided insured mortgages to build more than 1,000 nursing homes nationwide. Under seven different U.S. presidents, Holt worked to develop the expansive nursing home and housing system for the elderly that is still in use today. She served in the Federal Housing Administration's successor, the Department of Housing and Urban Development until the 1980s. While Holt did not consider herself a feminist and was critical of "women's lib," she nevertheless served on the boards of various women's clubs and organizations, helped advance the careers of other women, and was a role model for women leaders.

== Personal life ==
Holt married the former U.S. Senator Rush Holt Sr. on June 19, 1941. Rush was the youngest person ever elected to the Senate at the age of 29 in 1934. She remained married to him until his death from cancer on February 8, 1955. At the time of his death, Rush was serving in the first month of a term in the West Virginia House of Delegates. Holt had three children, including the Congressman from New Jersey's 12th congressional district, Rush Holt Jr. Holt never remarried and in 2013, she was a resident of Washington, D.C. She received an honorary degree from West Virginia University in 2013 and turned 100 in August of that year. Holt died in Boca Raton, Florida, of heart failure on July 12, 2015, aged 101, a month shy of her 102nd birthday. Her story has been written, by commission from Holt herself, by author Patricia Daly-Lipe as Helen Holt -Memoir of a Servant Leader.

Party political offices
Preceded by Holt Byrne	Republican nominee for Secretary of State of West Virginia; 1958	Succeeded by Carl E. Weimer
Political offices
Preceded by Daniel Pitt O'Brien	Secretary of State of West Virginia; 1957–1959	Succeeded by Joe F. Burdett
