= Houston G. Young =

Houston Goff Young (born near Lost Creek, West Virginia, October 10, 1882; died Charleston, West Virginia, January 1981) was an American lawyer, politician, and public servant. He served as the Secretary of State of West Virginia from 1917 to 1925.

== Early life ==
Young was the son of David S. Young, a farmer, and his wife Sarah (Pickens) Young. He attended college preparatory at what was then West Virginia Conference Seminary in Buckhannon, West Virginia (now West Virginia Wesleyan College), graduating in 1902. He then attended West Virginia University, graduating in 1906 with a bachelor of laws.

== Career ==
Young went to work in the office of the Secretary of State in 1907. In 1916 he was elected Secretary of State as a Republican, and again in 1920, serving from 1917 to 1925. Among his accomplishments in office were the creation of a State Sinking Fund Commission, passed by the legislature in 1921, the final payment of West Virginia's remaining debt to Virginia, and his work on the State Building Commission working to replace the state capitol, which had been destroyed by fire in 1921. Young was responsible for the hiring of architect Cass Gilbert to design the new building.

Young made news in 1921 by refusing to issue a charter to a West Virginia branch of the Ku Klux Klan.

After his term in office Young worked as a lawyer and a bond broker and investment banker in Charleston.

Young continued to be involved in politics, making several unsuccessful runs for office. In 1924 he campaigned for the Republican nomination for governor, but came in fourth in the primary. In 1942 he ran for United States Representative in the Sixth District of West Virginia, losing to the incumbent Democrat Joe L. Smith. A commentator in the Charleston Daily Mail wrote that Young had done well for a Republican in the district, cutting Lee's majority from 40,000 votes to about 4,000. As late as 1968 his endorsement of Arch A. Moore Jr. for the Republican nomination for governor was noted in the newspaper.

Young was instrumental in creating a Loyalty and Permanent Endowment Fund for needy students to attend West Virginia University, introducing a resolution for that purpose at a meeting of the West Virginia University Alumni Association in 1937. Young served as the president of the association from 1937 to 1938. He was one of the first honorees inducted into the "Order of Vandalia" for service to the university in 1961. Young was given an honorary doctorate of laws by West Virginia Wesleyan College in 1966. He was honored again for his achievements for the state in 1976 shortly after his 94th birthday, with Governor Moore and other well-wishers presenting him a plaque at a reception.

== Family and personal life ==
Young had several siblings. His older brother Laco (1869-1960) became a wealthy cattleman and the sheriff of Harrison County from 1921 to 1925. Young also had two sisters, Addie Johnson (1872-1898) and Edna Whitesel (1886-1972).

Young married Frances Virginia “Fannie” Chesney Young (1885-1963) in 1907; they had at least two children. Their son Houston Chesney Young (1908-1938), a lawyer, was killed in an automobile accident in Brownsville, Texas. They had at least one daughter, Mary Frances Young.

Young is buried in Sunset Memorial Park in South Charleston.
