= 2004 West Virginia Secretary of State election =

- November 2, 2004
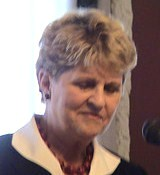

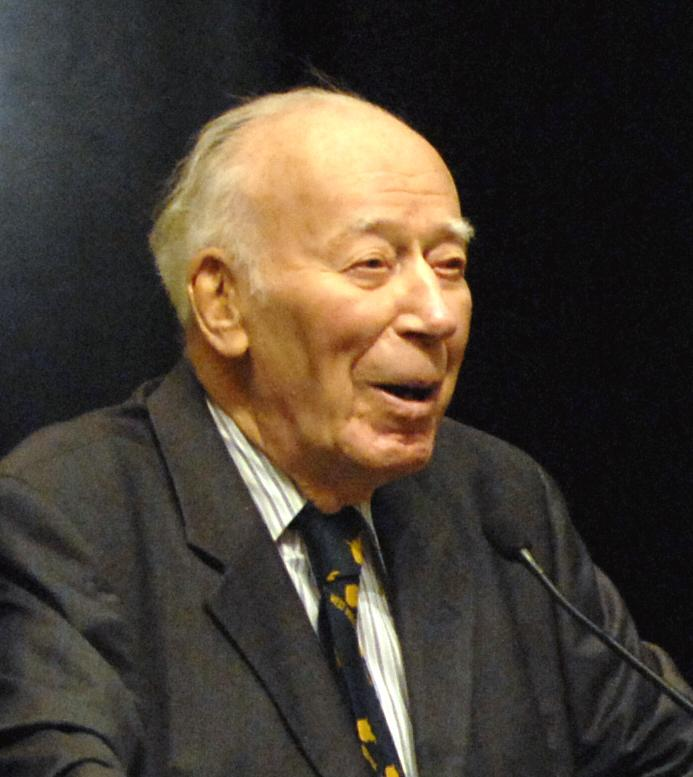
Nominee	Betty Ireland	Ken Hechler
Party	Republican	Democratic
Popular vote	375,024	347,780
Percentage	51.88%	48.12%
- County results Ireland: 50–60% 60–70% Hechler: 50–60% 60–70% 70–80%
Secretary of State before election
Joe Manchin
Democratic
Elected Secretary of State
Betty Ireland
Republican

The 2004 West Virginia secretary of state election was held on November 2, 2004, to elect the secretary of state of West Virginia. Democratic incumbent Joe Manchin chose to run for governor of West Virginia rather than seek a second term. Primaries were held on May 11, 2004. Manchin's predecessor, Democrat Ken Hechler, who had served as Secretary of State of West Virginia for 16 years prior, ran for a non-consecutive sixth term in office but was defeated by businesswoman Betty Ireland by a narrow margin of three percentage points.

With her victory, Ireland became the first woman elected to the executive branch in West Virginia.

This election, alongside the concurrent presidential election, were the only statewide victories for Republicans in West Virginia in 2004.

== Democratic primary ==
=== Candidates ===
- Donna J. Acord
- Larrie Bailey, former West Virginia State Treasurer (1990–1996), (1976–1984)
- George Daugherty, lawyer
- Ken Hechler, former secretary of state of West Virginia (1985–2001)
- Mike Oliverio, West Virginia state senator (1994–2010)
- Roger Pritt
- Natalie Tennant, TV reporter

=== Campaign ===
Hechler won the primary by a razor-thin margin of 0.43 percentage points over TV reporter and future Secretary of State of West Virginia Natalie Tennant.

=== Results ===
Democratic primary results
Party	Candidate	Votes	%
Democratic	Ken Hechler	67,065	25.74%
Democratic	Natalie Tennant	65,947	25.31%
Democratic	Mike Oliverio	52,720	20.23%
Democratic	Roger Pritt	40,823	15.57%
Democratic	Larrie Bailey	17,590	6.75%
Democratic	Donna Acord	9,296	3.57%
Democratic	George Daugherty	7,139	2.74%
Total votes		260,580	100.00%

== Republican primary ==
=== Candidates ===
- Betty Ireland, businesswoman

=== Campaign ===
Ireland won the Republican nomination unopposed.

=== Results ===
Republican primary results
Party	Candidate	Votes	%
Republican	Betty Ireland	91,039	100.00%
Total votes		91,039	100.00%

== General election ==
=== Candidates ===
- Betty Ireland, businesswoman (Republican)
- Ken Hechler, former secretary of state of West Virginia (1985–2001) (Democratic)

=== Results ===
2004 West Virginia Secretary of State election results
Party	Candidate	Votes	%	±%
Republican	Betty Ireland	375,024	51.88%	N/A
Democratic	Ken Hechler	347,780	48.12%	−41.32
Total votes		722,804	100.00%	
Republican gain from Democratic				
