= 2016 West Virginia State Treasurer election =

- November 8, 2016
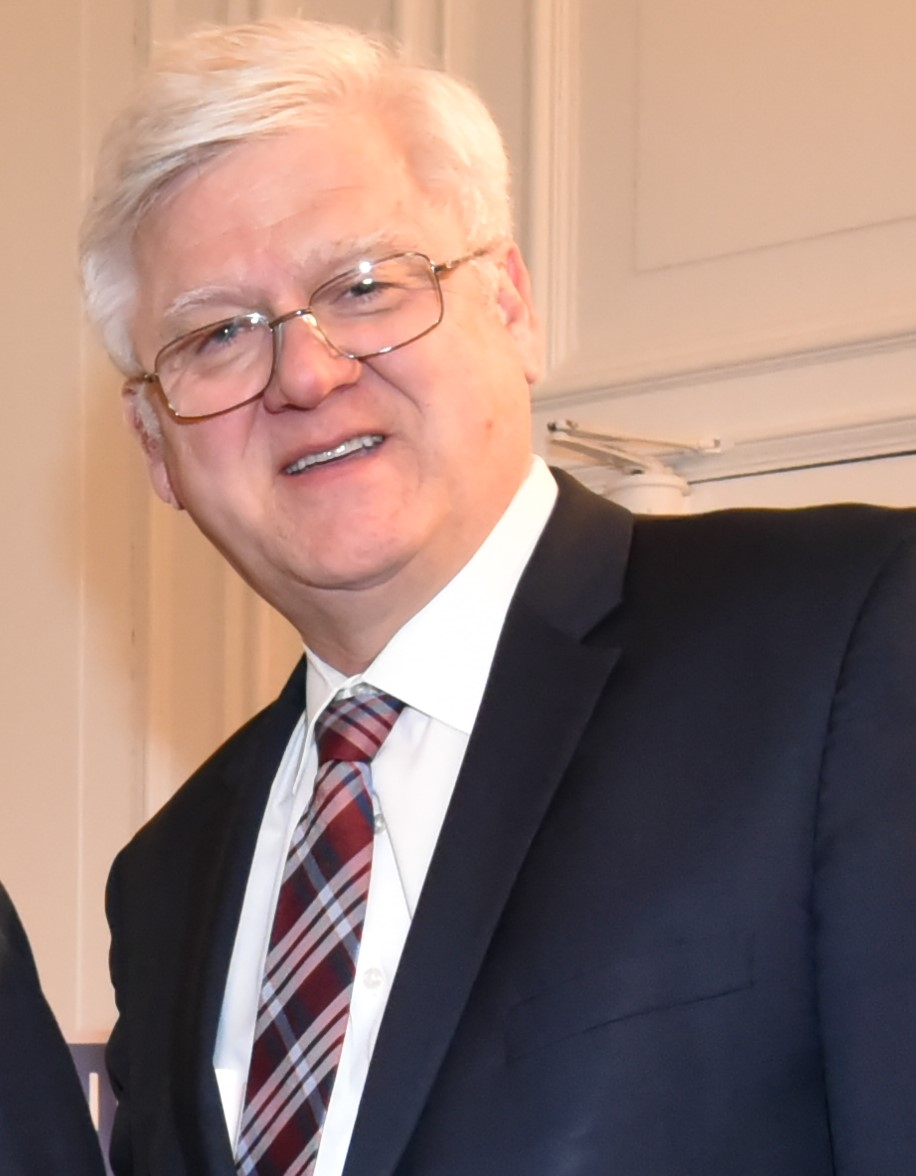

Nominee	John Perdue	Ann Urling	Michael Young
Party	Democratic	Republican	Libertarian
Popular vote	338,018	293,671	39,865
Percentage	50.33%	43.73%	5.94%
- Perdue: 40–50% 50–60% 60–70% Urling: 40–50% 50–60% 60–70%
State Treasurer before election
John Perdue
Democratic
Elected State Treasurer
John Perdue
Democratic

The 2016 West Virginia State Treasurer election was held on November 8, 2016, to elect the West Virginia State Treasurer, concurrently with the 2016 U.S. presidential election, as well as elections for the U.S. House of Representatives, governor, and other state and local elections.

Incumbent Democratic state treasurer John Perdue won re-election against Republican banker Ann Urling. As of 2026, this is the last time a Democratic candidate won a majority of the vote in a statewide election in West Virginia. (Note: Jim Justice and Joe Manchin, elected and re-elected in 2016 and 2018 respectively, both won with a plurality of the vote.)

== Democratic primary ==
=== Candidates ===
==== Nominee ====
- John Perdue, incumbent state treasurer (1997–present)

=== Endorsements ===
John Perdue

Labor unions

- West Virginia AFL-CIO

=== Results ===
Democratic primary results
Party	Candidate	Votes	%
Democratic	John Perdue (incumbent)	208,203	100.0
Total votes		208,203	100.0

== Republican primary ==
=== Candidates ===
==== Nominee ====
- Ann Urling, banker

==== Eliminated in primary ====
- Larry W. Faircloth

=== Results ===
Primary results by county Urling: 50–60%; 60–70%; 70–80%; 80–90%; Faircloth: 50–60%; 60–70%; 70–80%; 80–90%

Republican primary results
Party	Candidate	Votes	%
Republican	Ann Urling	88,703	54.94
Republican	Larry W. Faircloth	72,741	45.06
Total votes		161,444	100.0

== General election ==
=== Post-primary endorsements ===
John Perdue (D)

Labor unions

- International Brotherhood of Boilermakers, Iron Ship Builders, Blacksmiths, Forgers and Helpers

Newspapers and other media

- The Exponent Telegram
- The Charleston Gazette
- The Herald-Dispatch
Ann Urling (R)

Newspapers and other media

- Charleston Daily Mail

Organizations

- West Virginia Chamber of Commerce

=== Results ===
2016 West Virginia State Treasurer election
Party	Candidate	Votes	%
Democratic	John Perdue (incumbent)	338,018	50.33
Republican	Ann Urling	293,671	43.73
Libertarian	Michael Young	39,865	5.94
Total votes		671,554	100.0
Democratic hold			
