= 1988 West Virginia State Treasurer election =

- November 8, 1988
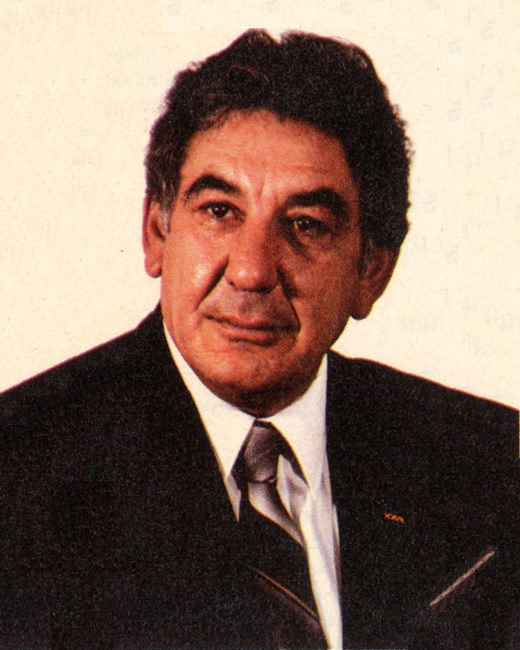
Nominee	A. James Manchin
Party	Democratic
Popular vote	449,164
Percentage	100.00%
- County results Manchin: 100%
State Treasurer before election
A. James Manchin
Democratic
Elected State Treasurer
A. James Manchin
Democratic

The 1988 West Virginia State Treasurer election took place on November 8, 1988, to elect the West Virginia State Treasurer.

Incumbent Democratic State Treasurer A. James Manchin won re-election to a second term unopposed, as the Republicans did not field a candidate.

However, just eight months later, Manchin would resign in July 1989 amid a controversy over bad investments before he could face an impeachment trial.

== Democratic primary ==
=== Candidates ===
==== Nominee ====
- A. James Manchin, incumbent state treasurer.

=== Results ===
1988 Democratic primary
Party	Candidate	Votes	%
Democratic	A. James Manchin (incumbent)	278,713	100.00%
Total votes		278,713	100.00%

== General election ==
=== Results ===
1988 West Virginia State Treasurer election
Party	Candidate	Votes	%
Democratic	A. James Manchin (incumbent)	449,164	100.00%
Total votes		449,164	100.00%
Democratic hold			
