= 1984 West Virginia Secretary of State election =

- November 6, 1984
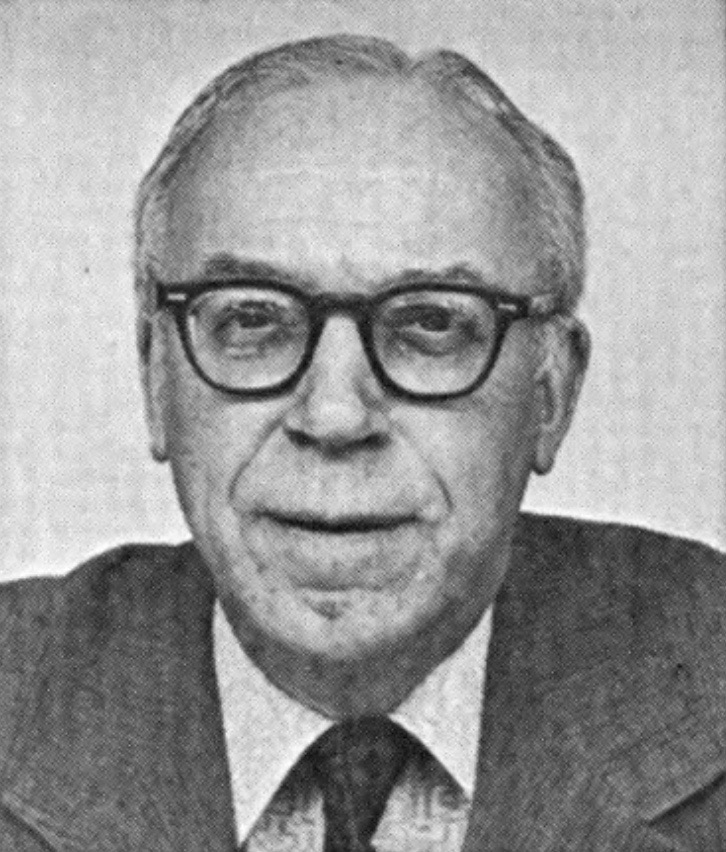

Nominee	Ken Hechler	Michele Golden
Party	Democratic	Republican
Popular vote	434,488	247,080
Percentage	63.75%	36.25%
- County results Hechler: 50–60% 60–70% 70–80% 80–90% Golden: 50–60% 60–70% 70–80%
Secretary of State before election
A. James Manchin
Democratic
Elected Secretary of State
Ken Hechler
Democratic

The 1984 West Virginia Secretary of State election took place on November 6, 1984, to elect the Secretary of State of West Virginia. Incumbent Democrat A. James Manchin chose not to seek reelection to a third term, instead choosing to run for State Treasurer.

Former congressman Ken Hechler beat Republican nominee Michele Golden 64% to 36%.

== Democratic primary ==
=== Candidates ===
==== Nominee ====
- Ken Hechler, former U.S. Representative from West Virginia's 4th congressional district. (1959-1977)

=== Results ===
1984 Democratic primary
Party	Candidate	Votes	%
Democratic	Ken Hechler	188,526	54.40%
Democratic	Billy B. Burke	44,017	12.70%
Democratic	Charles S. Smith	41,001	11.83%
Democratic	R.F. Hatfield	34,631	10.00%
Democratic	Homer Heck	28,910	8.34%
Democratic	J.L. Smith	9,471	2.73%
Total votes		346,556	100.00%

== Republican primary ==
=== Candidates ===
==== Nominee ====
- Michele Golden.

==== Eliminated in primary ====
- Ray L. Pittman
- John W. Lusher

=== Results ===
1984 Republican primary
Party	Candidate	Votes	%
Republican	Michele Golden	50,146	44.07%
Republican	Ray L. Pittman	33,219	29.19%
Republican	John W. Lusher	30,424	26.74%
Total votes		113,789	100.00%

== General election ==
=== Results ===
1984 West Virginia Secretary of State election
Party	Candidate	Votes	%
Democratic	Ken Hechler	434,488	63.75%
Republican	Michele Golden	247,080	36.25%
Total votes		681,568	100.00%
Democratic hold			
