= 1980 West Virginia Secretary of State election =

- November 4, 1980
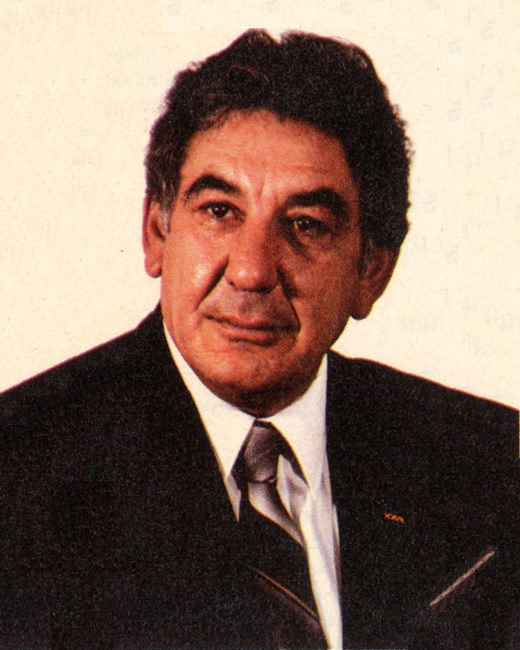

Nominee	A. James Manchin	Dee Brown
Party	Democratic	Republican
Popular vote	486,035	201,647
Percentage	70.68%	29.32%
- County results Manchin: 50–60% 60–70% 70–80% 80–90% Brown: 60–70%
Secretary of State before election
A. James Manchin
Democratic
Elected Secretary of State
A. James Manchin
Democratic

The 1980 West Virginia Secretary of State election took place on November 4, 1980, to elect the Secretary of State of West Virginia.

Incumbent Democrat A. James Manchin won re-election to a second term, defeating Republican nominee Dee Brown.

== Democratic primary ==
=== Candidates ===
==== Nominee ====
- A. James Manchin, incumbent Secretary of State.

=== Results ===
1980 Democratic primary
Party	Candidate	Votes	%
Democratic	A. James Manchin (incumbent)	271,224	100.00%
Total votes		271,224	100.00%

== Republican primary ==
=== Candidates ===
==== Nominee ====
- Dee Brown.

==== Eliminated in primary ====
- E.E. Cumpton.
- John W. Lusher.

=== Results ===
1980 Republican primary
Party	Candidate	Votes	%
Republican	Dee Brown	46,582	44.10%
Republican	John W. Lusher	36,187	34.26%
Republican	E.E. Cumpton	22,857	21.64%
Total votes		105,626	100.00%

== General election ==
=== Results ===
1980 West Virginia Secretary of State election
Party	Candidate	Votes	%
Democratic	A. James Manchin (incumbent)	486,035	70.68%
Republican	Dee Brown	201,647	29.32%
Total votes		687,682	100.00%
Democratic hold			
