= 1996 West Virginia Secretary of State election =

- November 5, 1996
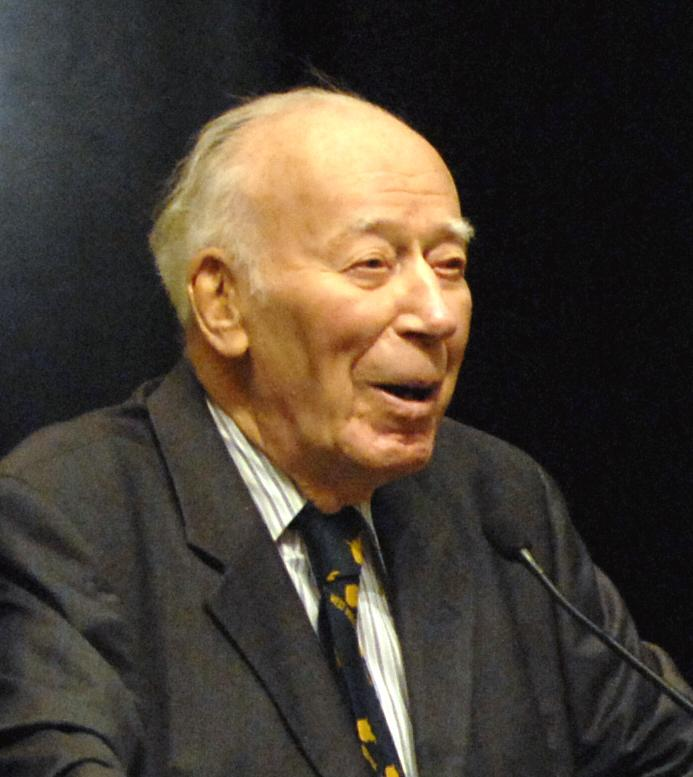

Nominee	Ken Hechler	Vernon R. Hayes, Jr.
Party	Democratic	Republican
Popular vote	396,794	174,567
Percentage	69.45%	30.55%
- County results Hechler: 50–60% 60–70% 70–80% 80–90% Hayes: 50–60%
Secretary of State before election
Ken Hechler
Democratic
Elected Secretary of State
Ken Hechler
Democratic

The 1996 West Virginia secretary of state election was held on November 5, 1996 to elect the secretary of state of West Virginia. Democratic incumbent Ken Hechler successfully won a fourth and final term in a landslide, defeating Republican Vernon R. Hayes, Jr. by nearly forty percentage points.

== Democratic primary ==
=== Candidates ===
- Ken Hechler, incumbent secretary of state of West Virginia (1985–2001)

=== Results ===
Democratic primary results
Party	Candidate	Votes	%
Democratic	Ken Hechler	268,393	100.0%
Total votes		268,393	100.0%

== Republican primary ==
=== Candidates ===
- Vernon R. Hayes, Jr.
- Henry L. Thaxton, Christian school administrator

=== Results ===
Republican primary results
Party	Candidate	Votes	%
Republican	Vernon R. Hayes, Jr.	56,931	55.0%
Republican	Henry L. Thaxton	46,547	45.0%
Total votes		103,478	100.0%

== General election ==
=== Candidates ===
- Ken Hechler, incumbent secretary of state of West Virginia (1985–2001) (Democratic)
- Vernon R. Hayes, Jr. (Republican)

=== Results ===
1996 West Virginia Secretary of State election results
Party	Candidate	Votes	%	±%
Democratic	Ken Hechler	396,794	69.45%	−0.49
Republican	Vernon R. Hayes, Jr.	174,567	30.55%	+0.19
Total votes		571,361	100.00%	
Democratic hold				
