= 2020 West Virginia State Treasurer election =

- November 3, 2020
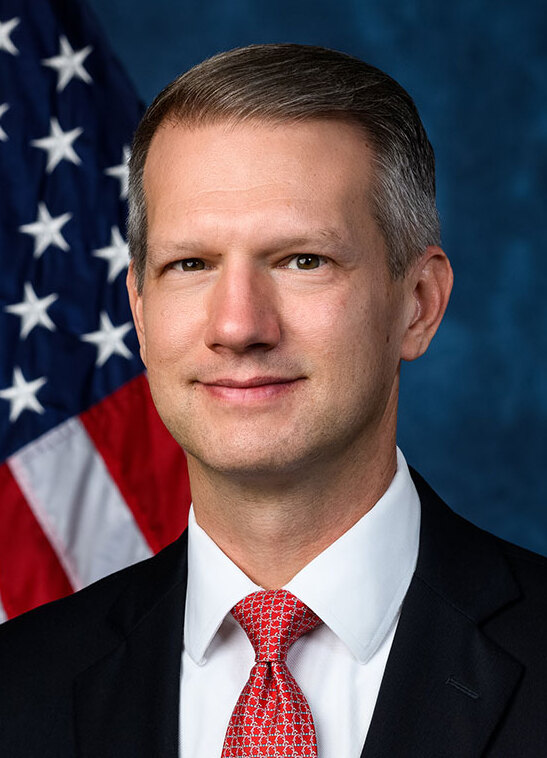

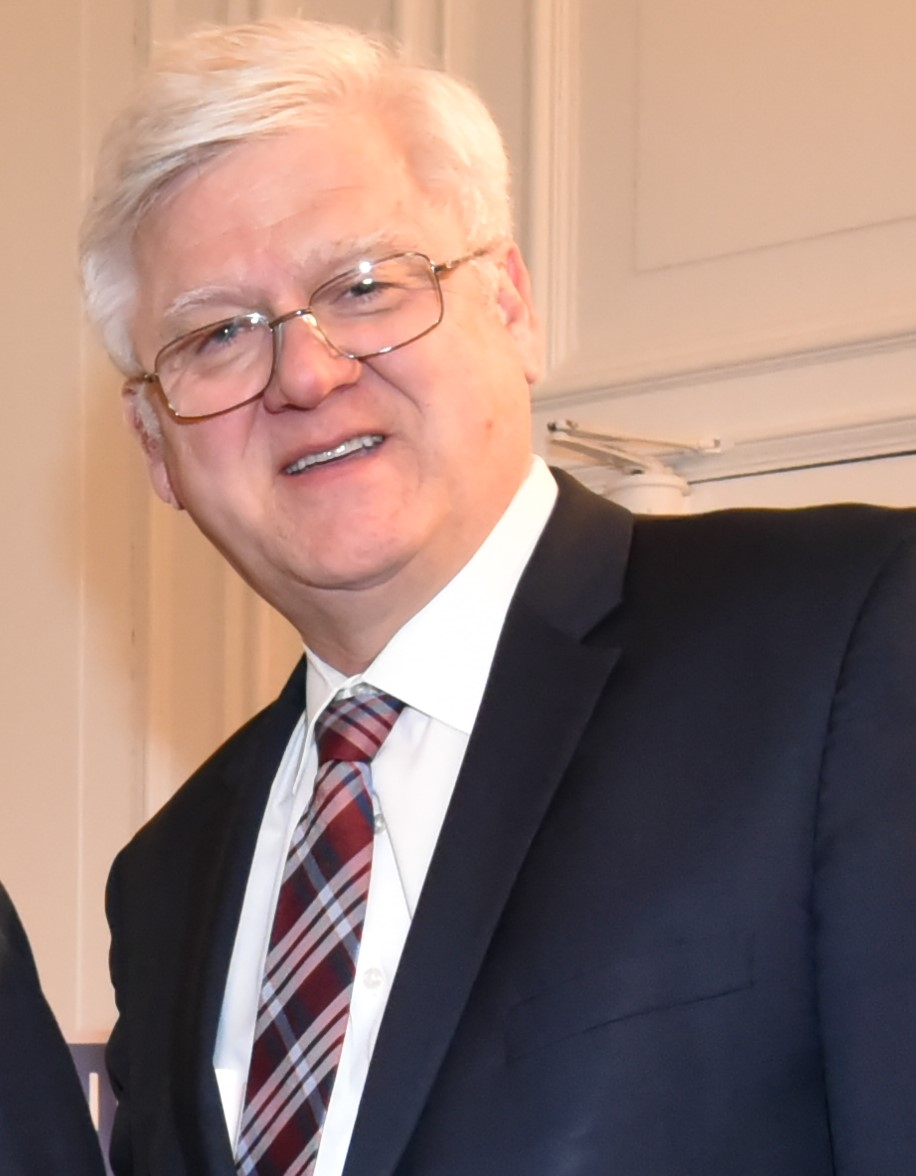
| Nominee | Riley Moore | John Perdue |
| Party | Republican | Democratic |
| Popular vote | 425,745 | 330,316 |
| Percentage | 56.31% | 43.69% |
- Moore: 50–60% 60–70% 70–80% 80–90% >90% Perdue: 50–60% 60–70% 70–80% 80–90% >90% Tie: 50%
State Treasurer before election
John Perdue
Democratic
Elected State Treasurer
Riley Moore
Republican

The 2020 West Virginia State Treasurer election was held on November 3, 2020, to elect the state treasurer of West Virginia. Incumbent Democrat John Perdue lost re-election to a seventh term to Republican nominee Riley Moore, who won 48 out of 55 counties. Primary elections were held on June 9. Perdue and Moore both won their primaries unopposed.

This was the first time since W. S. Johnson's victory in 1928 that a Republican was elected to the West Virginia state treasurer’s office.

== Democratic primary ==
=== Candidates ===
==== Nominee ====
- John Perdue, incumbent state treasurer

=== Results ===
Democratic primary results
| Party | Candidate | Votes | % |
|---|---|---|---|
| Democratic | John Perdue (incumbent) | 170,519 | 100.0% |
| Total votes | | 170,519 | 100.0% |

== Republican primary ==
=== Candidates ===
==== Nominee ====
- Riley Moore, former state delegate

=== Results ===
Republican primary results
| Party | Candidate | Votes | % |
|---|---|---|---|
| Republican | Riley Moore | 166,977 | 100.0% |
| Total votes | | 166,977 | 100.0% |

== General election ==
=== Results ===
2020 West Virginia State Treasurer election
| Party | Candidate | Votes | % |
|---|---|---|---|
| Republican | Riley Moore | 425,745 | 56.31% |
| Democratic | John Perdue (incumbent) | 330,316 | 43.69% |
| Total votes | | 756,061 | 100.0% |
| Republican gain from Democratic | | | |

==== By county ====
| County | Riley Moore Republican | | John Perdue Democratic | |
| County | # | % | # | % |
|---|---|---|---|---|
| Barbour | 3,942 | 61.58% | 2,459 | 38.42% |
| Berkeley | 33,165 | 66.39% | 16,791 | 33.61% |
| Boone | 3,695 | 42.60% | 4,979 | 57.40% |
| Braxton | 2,549 | 47.79% | 2,785 | 52.21% |
| Brooke | 6,049 | 60.36% | 3,973 | 39.64% |
| Cabell | 16,488 | 46.56% | 18,925 | 53.44% |
| Calhoun | 1,549 | 56.47% | 1,194 | 43.53% |
| Clay | 1,537 | 47.97% | 1,667 | 52.03% |
| Doddridge | 2,120 | 72.35% | 810 | 27.65% |
| Fayette | 8,441 | 52.58% | 7,612 | 47.42% |
| Gilmer | 1,303 | 51.89% | 1,208 | 48.11% |
| Grant | 4,002 | 80.33% | 980 | 19.67% |
| Greenbrier | 8,848 | 57.84% | 6,450 | 42.16% |
| Hampshire | 7,176 | 75.35% | 2,347 | 24.65% |
| Hancock | 8,387 | 64.11% | 4,696 | 35.89% |
| Hardy | 3,958 | 64.99% | 2,132 | 35.01% |
| Harrison | 16,397 | 56.13% | 12,817 | 43.87% |
| Jackson | 7,145 | 55.23% | 5,792 | 44.77% |
| Jefferson | 15,973 | 59.53% | 10,857 | 40.47% |
| Kanawha | 30,612 | 38.84% | 48,201 | 61.16% |
| Lewis | 4,330 | 59.99% | 2,888 | 40.01% |
| Lincoln | 3,828 | 52.20% | 3,505 | 47.80% |
| Logan | 5,692 | 48.70% | 5,996 | 51.30% |
| Marion | 12,733 | 51.38% | 12,051 | 48.62% |
| Marshall | 8,530 | 63.95% | 4,809 | 36.05% |
| Mason | 5,885 | 55.12% | 4,792 | 44.88% |
| McDowell | 3,297 | 57.72% | 2,415 | 42.28% |
| Mercer | 15,518 | 64.27% | 8,627 | 35.73% |
| Mineral | 9,259 | 75.53% | 2,999 | 24.47% |
| Mingo | 5,130 | 57.23% | 3,834 | 42.77% |
| Monongalia | 18,307 | 45.59% | 21,850 | 54.41% |
| Monroe | 3,985 | 64.53% | 2,190 | 35.47% |
| Morgan | 6,211 | 75.26% | 2,042 | 24.74% |
| Nicholas | 5,646 | 56.05% | 4,428 | 43.95% |
| Ohio | 10,797 | 56.66% | 8,260 | 43.34% |
| Pendleton | 2,108 | 62.22% | 1,280 | 37.78% |
| Pleasants | 2,128 | 64.56% | 1,168 | 35.44% |
| Pocahontas | 2,163 | 57.77% | 1,581 | 42.23% |
| Preston | 9,299 | 68.24% | 4,375 | 31.76% |
| Putnam | 14,087 | 51.51% | 13,260 | 48.49% |
| Raleigh | 19,391 | 61.45% | 12,164 | 38.55% |
| Randolph | 6,457 | 55.27% | 5,226 | 44.73% |
| Ritchie | 2,868 | 71.66% | 1,134 | 28.34% |
| Roane | 3,009 | 54.50% | 2,512 | 45.50% |
| Summers | 2,852 | 54.43% | 2,388 | 45.57% |
| Taylor | 4,249 | 59.65% | 2,874 | 40.35% |
| Tucker | 2,204 | 60.40% | 1,445 | 39.60% |
| Tyler | 2,639 | 70.79% | 1,089 | 29.21% |
| Upshur | 6,072 | 61.95% | 3,729 | 38.05% |
| Wayne | 8,493 | 54.41% | 7,115 | 45.59% |
| Webster | 1,753 | 56.38% | 1,356 | 43.62% |
| Wetzel | 3,742 | 59.79% | 2,517 | 40.21% |
| Wirt | 1,582 | 63.10% | 925 | 36.90% |
| Wood | 23,034 | 62.39% | 13,887 | 37.61% |
| Wyoming | 5,031 | 63.20% | 2,930 | 36.80% |
| Totals | 425,745 | 56.31% | 330,316 | 43.69% |

Counties that flipped from Democratic to Republican

- Barbour (largest city: Philippi)
- Calhoun (largest city: Grantsville)
- Gilmer (largest city: Glenville)
- Greenbrier (largest city: Lewisburg)
- Hardy (largest city: Moorefield)
- Jackson (largest city: Ravenswood)
- Lewis (largest city: Weston)
- Marshall (largest city: Moundsville)
- Mason (largest city: Point Pleasant)
- Monroe (largest city: Peterstown)
- Nicholas (largest city: Summersville)
- Pendleton (largest city: Franklin)
- Pleasants (largest city: St. Marys)
- Pocahontas (largest city: Marlinton)
- Raleigh (largest city: Beckley)
- Randolph (largest city: Elkins)
- Roane (largest city: Spencer)
- Summers (largest city: Hinton)
- Taylor (largest city: Grafton)
- Tucker (largest city: Parsons)
- Wayne (largest city: Kenova)
- Wetzel (largest city: New Martinsville)
- Harrison (largest city: Clarksburg)
- Lincoln (largest city: Hamlin)
- Wyoming (largest city: Mullens)
- Brooke (largest borough: Wellsburg)
- Fayette (largest city: Fayetteville)
- Mingo (largest borough: Williamson)
- Marion (largest city: Fairmont)
- McDowell (largest city: Welch)
- Webster (largest town: Webster Springs)
- Upshur (largest municipality: Buckhannon)
- Wirt (largest municipality: Elizabeth)

==== By congressional district ====
Moore won all three congressional districts.

| District | Perdue | Moore | Representative |
|---|---|---|---|
| 1st | 41% | 59% | David McKinley |
| 2nd | 46% | 54% | Alex Mooney |
| 3rd | 45% | 55% | Carol Miller |
