= 2000 West Virginia Secretary of State election =

- November 7, 2000
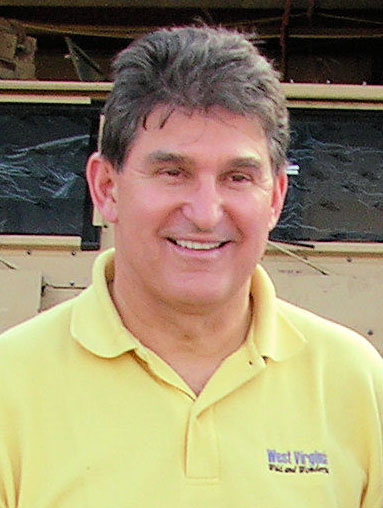

Nominee	Joe Manchin	Poochie Myers
Party	Democratic	Libertarian
Popular vote	478,489	56,477
Percentage	89.44%	10.56%
- County results Manchin: 80–90% >90%
Secretary of State before election
Ken Hechler
Democratic
Elected Secretary of State
Joe Manchin
Democratic

The 2000 West Virginia Secretary of State election was held on November 7, 2000, to elect the secretary of state of West Virginia. Democratic incumbent Ken Hechler chose to unsuccessfully run for Representative rather than seek a fifth term. Primaries were held on May 9, 2000. Democratic nominee West Virginia state senator Joe Manchin faced only token opposition from Libertarian candidate Poochie Myers and won the election in a blowout, winning with nearly 90% of the vote.

== Democratic primary ==
=== Candidates ===
- Joe Manchin, West Virginia state senator (1986–1996)
- Bobby Nelson, former mayor of Huntington (1986–1993)
- Mike Oliverio, West Virginia state senator (1994–2010)
- Charlotte Pritt, former West Virginia state senator (1988–1992)

=== Campaign ===
Manchin easily won the Democratic nomination, winning by over 22 percentage points against his closest opponent, Charlotte Pritt, who had previously defeated him in the 1996 Democratic primary for Governor of West Virginia.

=== Results ===
Democratic primary results
Party	Candidate	Votes	%
Democratic	Joe Manchin	141,839	51.08%
Democratic	Charlotte Pritt	80,148	28.86%
Democratic	Mike Oliverio	35,424	12.76%
Democratic	Bobby Nelson	20,259	7.30%
Total votes		277,670	100.0%

== Libertarian primary ==
=== Candidates ===
- Poochie Myers

=== Campaign ===
Myers won the Libertarian nomination unopposed.

=== Results ===
Libertarian primary results
Party	Candidate	Votes	%
Libertarian	Poochie Myers	260	100.00%
Total votes		260	100.00%

== General election ==
=== Candidates ===
- Joe Manchin, West Virginia state senator (1986–1996) (Democratic)
- Poochie Myers (Libertarian)

=== Results ===
2000 West Virginia Secretary of State election results
Party	Candidate	Votes	%	±%
Democratic	Joe Manchin	478,489	89.44%	+19.99
Libertarian	Poochie Myers	56,477	10.56%	N/A
Total votes		534,966	100.00%	
Democratic hold				
