= John Perdue =

American politician

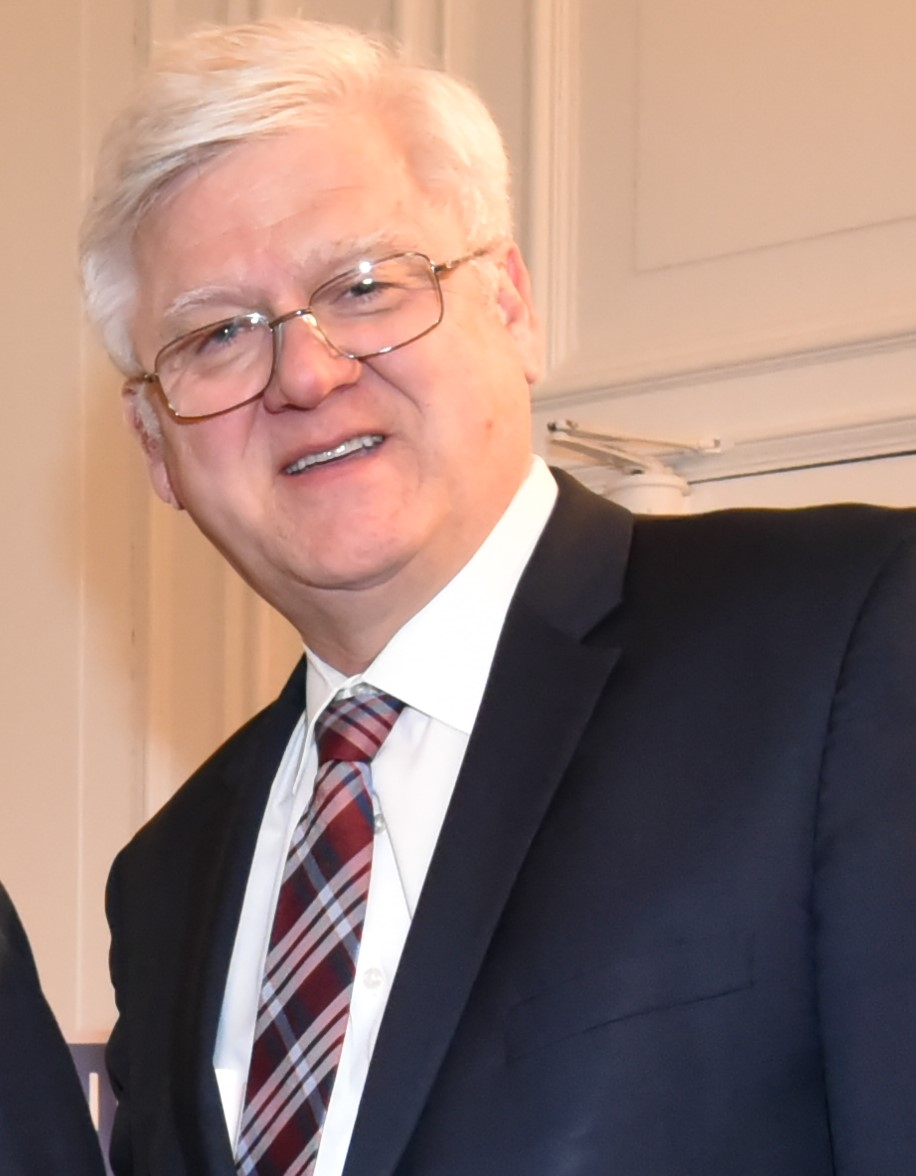

West Virginia State Treasurer
- In office January 13, 1997 – January 18, 2021
- Governor: Cecil Underwood; Bob Wise; Joe Manchin; Earl Ray Tomblin; Jim Justice
- Preceded by: Larrie Bailey
- Succeeded by: Riley Moore

Personal details
- Born: June 22, 1950 (age 76) Boone County, West Virginia, U.S.
- Party: Democratic
- Spouse: Robin Perdue
- Children: 2
- Education: West Virginia University (BA)

John D. Perdue (born June 22, 1950) is an American politician who served as the 24th West Virginia State Treasurer from 1997 to 2021. He is the latest Democratic candidate to receive more than 50% of the vote in the state.

Purdue was born in Boone County, West Virginia and grew up on a small farm. In 1972 he graduated from West Virginia University with a Bachelor of Science in Agriculture. Whilst at University he was active in 4-H and the Future Farmers of America, becoming a 4-H All Star.

He has a wife, Robin, with whom he has two daughters.

== Political career ==
In 1989 he became Executive Assistant to West Virginia Governor Gaston Caperton, serving as a member of his staff for eight years.

In 1996 he won election as state treasurer as a member of the Democratic Party, a position he would hold for six terms. He was easily re-elected in his subsequent three elections, with no Republican even filing to run against him in 2000 and 2008.

Following Governor Joe Manchin's resignation in 2010 to take his seat in the US Senate, he stood in the subsequent gubernatorial special election. He finished fourth in the Democratic Primary, which was won by Earl Ray Tomblin.

His re-election in 2012 was closer than previous elections, winning 55% of the vote compared to his previous lowest of 60%. In 2016 he was re-elected with 50.3% of the vote, whilst Republican Donald Trump won the state in the concurrent Presidential election with 68.5% of the vote.

Following governor Jim Justice’s defection to the Republican Party in 2017, Purdue was left as the only Democrat holding statewide office in West Virginia besides Joe Manchin.

Perdue lost his bid for a seventh term in 2020 to Republican Riley Moore. His 24 year tenure as treasurer is the longest in the history of the office.

In December 2021 he was appointed by Joe Biden as State Executive Director for USDA's Farm Service Agency in West Virginia.

== Electoral history ==
West Virginia Treasurer Election, 1996
Party	Candidate	Votes	%
Democratic	John Perdue	341,395	60.60
Republican	Stan Klos	222,071	39.40

West Virginia Treasurer Election, 2000
Party	Candidate	Votes	%
Democratic	John Perdue (inc.)	468,870	100.00

West Virginia Treasurer Election, 2004
Party	Candidate	Votes	%
Democratic	John Perdue (inc.)	433,229	62.94
Republican	Bob Adams	255,046	37.06

West Virginia Treasurer Election, 2008
Party	Candidate	Votes	%
Democratic	John Perdue (inc.)	520,406	100.00

West Virginia Governor Special Democratic Primary Election, 2011
Party	Candidate	Votes	%
Democratic	Earl Ray Tomblin	51,348	40.40
Democratic	Rick Thompson	30,631	24.10
Democratic	Natalie Tennant	22,106	17.39
Democratic	John Perdue	15,995	12.58
Democratic	Jeff Kessler	6,550	5.15
Democratic	Arne Moltis	481	0.38

West Virginia Treasurer Election, 2012
Party	Candidate	Votes	%
Democratic	John Perdue (inc.)	348,267	55.41
Republican	Mike Hall	280,316	44.59

West Virginia Treasurer Election, 2016
Party	Candidate	Votes	%
Democratic	John Perdue (inc.)	335,980	50.4
Republican	Ann Urling	291,710	43.7

West Virginia Treasurer Election, 2020
Party	Candidate	Votes	%
Democratic	John Perdue (inc.)	330,316	43.7
Republican	Riley Moore	425,745	56.3

Party political offices
Preceded by Larrie Bailey	Democratic nominee for West Virginia State Treasurer; 1996, 2000, 2004, 2008, 2012, 2016, 2020	Most recent
Political offices
Preceded by Larrie Bailey	Treasurer of West Virginia; 1997–2021	Succeeded by Riley Moore
