= Riley Moore =

American politician (born 1980)

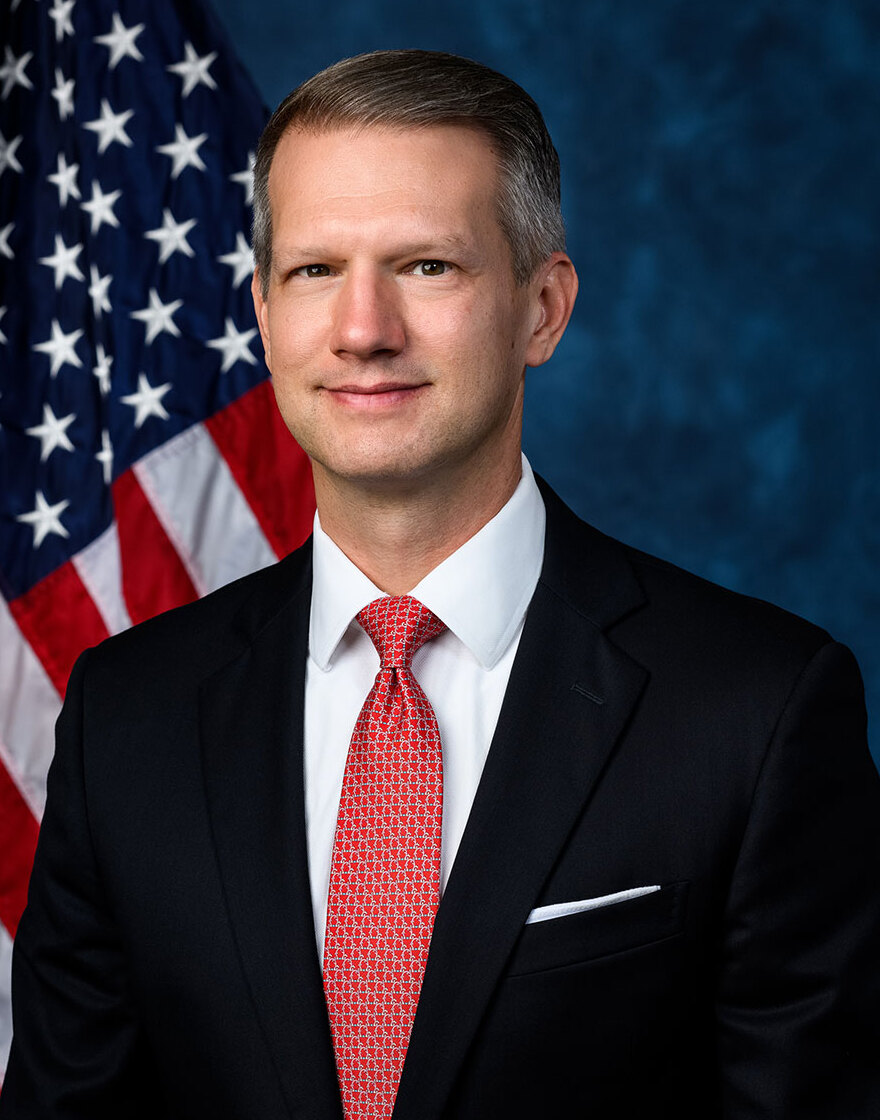
- Official portrait, 2024

Member of the U.S. House of Representatives from West Virginia's 2nd district
- Incumbent
- Assumed office January 3, 2025
- Preceded by: Alex Mooney

25th Treasurer of West Virginia
- In office January 18, 2021 – January 3, 2025
- Governor: Jim Justice
- Preceded by: John Perdue
- Succeeded by: Larry Pack

Member of the West Virginia House of Delegates from the 67th district
- In office January 2017 – January 2019
- Preceded by: Stephen Skinner
- Succeeded by: John Doyle

Personal details
- Born: Riley McGowan Moore; July 1, 1980 (age 46) Morgantown, West Virginia, U.S.
- Party: Republican
- Spouse: Guillermina Garcia
- Children: 3
- Relatives: Arch Moore (grandfather); Shelley Moore (grandmother); Shelley Moore Capito (aunt); Moore Capito (cousin)
- Education: George Mason University (BA); National Defense University (MS)
- Website: House website Campaign website

Riley McGowan Moore (born July 1, 1980) is an American politician who has served as the U.S. representative for West Virginia's 2nd congressional district since 2025. A member of the Republican Party, he served as the 25th treasurer of West Virginia from 2021 to 2025 and as West Virginia's state delegate for its 67th district from 2017 to 2019.

== Early life and career ==
Moore earned an apprenticeship certificate in welding from the C. S. Monroe Technology Center, a bachelor's degree in government from George Mason University, and a master's degree in strategic security studies from the National Defense University. He also served as a staffer on the United States House Committee on Foreign Affairs. Moore worked as a welder.

From 2013 to 2017, Moore was a Vice President of the Podesta Group, a lobbying firm closely associated with the Democratic Party, where he was part of a client team working on the European Centre for a Modern Ukraine (ECFMU), which had been formed to represent former Ukrainian President, Viktor Yanukovych. During the subsequent investigation, Moore was never identified as a person associated with the case. Starting in 2017, Moore became a director at Textron.

== West Virginia House of Delegates ==
With Stephen Skinner opting not to run for reelection for the 67th district in the West Virginia House of Delegates in 2016, Moore ran to succeed him, defeating Rod Snyder. He was elected, and served as assistant majority whip for the Republicans.

In 2018, Moore was named by Speaker of the House Roger Hanshaw as the next Majority Leader in the House. He lost his reelection bid in 2018 to John Doyle.

== State Treasurer of West Virginia ==
In 2020, Moore ran for West Virginia State Treasurer. He was unopposed in the Republican primary and faced 24-year incumbent John Perdue in the general election. Moore won the general election with 56% of the vote.

Riley opposed ESG investing during his tenure as State Treasurer. In June 2022, Moore issued a letter to six financial institutions (BlackRock, JPMorgan Chase, Wells Fargo, Morgan Stanley, US Bancorp, and Goldman Sachs), saying that they would no longer be allowed to do business with the state of West Virginia because of their advocacy against the fossil fuel industry.

== U.S. House of Representatives ==
On November 21, 2022, Moore announced that he was running for the United States House of Representatives in West Virginia's 2nd congressional district in the 2024 elections to succeed Alex Mooney, a member of the Republican Party who was running for the United States Senate. Moore won the primary election for the Republican nomination against four other candidates, receiving 46 percent of the vote. He was elected in the November 2024 general election. On January 3, 2025, Moore was sworn in as a member of the U.S. House of Representatives.

In March 2025, Moore introduced a bill that would ban the issuing of student visas for all citizens of the People's Republic of China. Various groups such as the Committee of 100 and the Asian American Foundation labeled the bill Sinophobic.

In April 2025, Moore posed for photos in front of prisoners at the Terrorism Confinement Center in El Salvador. The Trump administration had shipped immigrants without criminal records to the prison, including immigrants like Kilmar Abrego Garcia who were illegally abducted and transported to the prison. Moore praised Trump for doing so, saying "Several inmates were extremely violent criminals recently deported from the U.S. I leave now even more determined to support President Trump's efforts to secure our homeland."

=== Committee assignments ===
For the 119th Congress:

- Committee on Appropriations
  - Subcommittee on Commerce, Justice, Science, and Related Agencies
  - Subcommittee on Labor, Health and Human Services, Education, and Related Agencies
  - Subcommittee on Legislative Branch

=== Caucus memberships ===
- Republican Study Committee

== Personal life ==
Moore's grandfather, Arch A. Moore Jr., is a former governor of West Virginia and represented Riley's congressional district, then numbered as the 1st district, from 1957 to 1969. Moore was named for his grandmother, Shelley Riley Moore. His aunt, Shelley Moore Capito, and cousin, Moore Capito, are also politicians. Moore is a Catholic. Moore and his wife, Guillermina (née Garcia), and their two daughters and son live in Harpers Ferry, West Virginia.

== Electoral history ==
Electoral history of Juan Ciscomani
Year	Office	Party	Primary			General			Result	Swing	Ref.
Year	Office	Party	Total	%	P.	Total	%	P.	Result	Swing	Ref.
2016	House of Delegates	Republican	1,177	78.1%	1st	4,230	50.6%	1st	Won	Gain	
2018	House of Delegates	Republican	1,084	80.5%	1st	3,320	44.1%	2nd	Lost	Gain	
2020	Treasurer	Republican	169,798	100.0%	1st	425,745	56.3%	1st	Won	Gain	
2024	U.S. representative	Republican	47,033	45.0%	1st	268,190	70.8%	1st	Won	Hold	

Party political offices
Preceded by Ann Urling	Republican nominee for Treasurer of West Virginia; 2020	Succeeded by Larry Pack
Political offices
Preceded by John Perdue	Treasurer of West Virginia; 2021–2025	Succeeded by Larry Pack
U.S. House of Representatives
Preceded by Alex Mooney	Member of the U.S. House of Representatives from West Virginia's 2nd congressional district 2025–present	Incumbent
U.S. order of precedence (ceremonial)
Preceded by Dave Min	United States representatives by seniority 406th	Succeeded by Tim Moore
