= 1984 West Virginia State Treasurer election =

- November 6, 1984
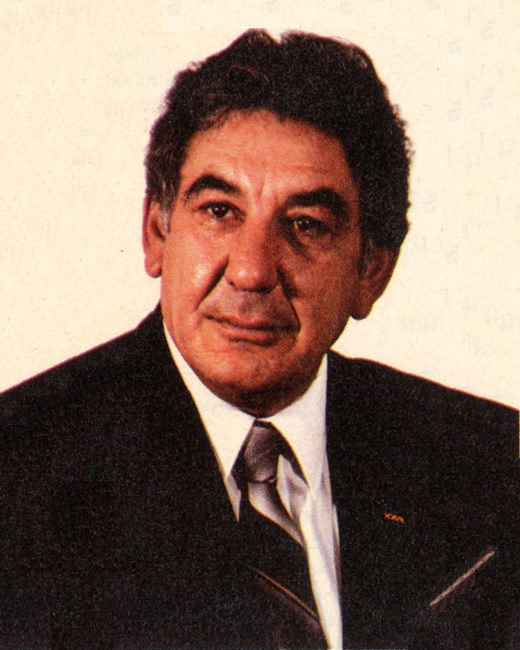

Nominee	A. James Manchin	Manuel Hale
Party	Democratic	Republican
Popular vote	459,218	233,191
Percentage	66.32%	33.68%
- County results Manchin: 50–60% 60–70% 70–80% 80–90% Hale: 50–60%
State Treasurer before election
Larrie Bailey
Democratic
Elected State Treasurer
A. James Manchin
Democratic

The 1984 West Virginia State Treasurer election took place on November 6, 1984, to elect the West Virginia State Treasurer.

Incumbent Democratic Treasurer Larrie Bailey ran for re-election to a third term, but was defeated in the Democratic primary by Secretary of State A. James Manchin. Manchin then went on to win the general election over Republican nominee Manuel "Pat" Hale, 66.3% to 33.7%.

== Democratic primary ==
=== Candidates ===
==== Nominee ====
- A. James Manchin, incumbent Secretary of State.

==== Eliminated in primary ====
- Larrie Bailey, incumbent State Treasurer.

=== Polling ===
Poll source	Date(s) administered	Sample size	Margin of error	James Manchin	Larrie Bailey	Undecided
West Virginia Poll	April, 1984	N/A	± 3.8%	61.6%	31.8%	N/A
West Virginia Poll	May 15 - 22, 1984	689 (RV)	± 3.8%	65.7%	27.9%	N/A

=== Results ===
June 5, 1984 Democratic primary
Party	Candidate	Votes	%
Democratic	A. James Manchin	215,614	60.36%
Democratic	Larrie Bailey (incumbent)	141,604	39.64%
Total votes		357,218	100.00%

== Republican primary ==
=== Candidates ===
==== Nominee ====
- Manuel "Pat" Hale.

=== Results ===
June 5, 1984 Republican primary
Party	Candidate	Votes	%
Republican	Manuel Hale	101,449	100.00%
Total votes		101,449	100.00%

== General election ==
=== Candidates ===
- Democratic: A. James Manchin.
- Republican: Manuel Hale.

=== Results ===
1984 West Virginia State Treasurer election
Party	Candidate	Votes	%
Democratic	A. James Manchin	459,218	66.32%
Republican	Manuel Hale	233,191	33.68%
Total votes		692,409	100.00%
Democratic hold			
