= 2012 West Virginia Secretary of State election =

- November 6, 2012
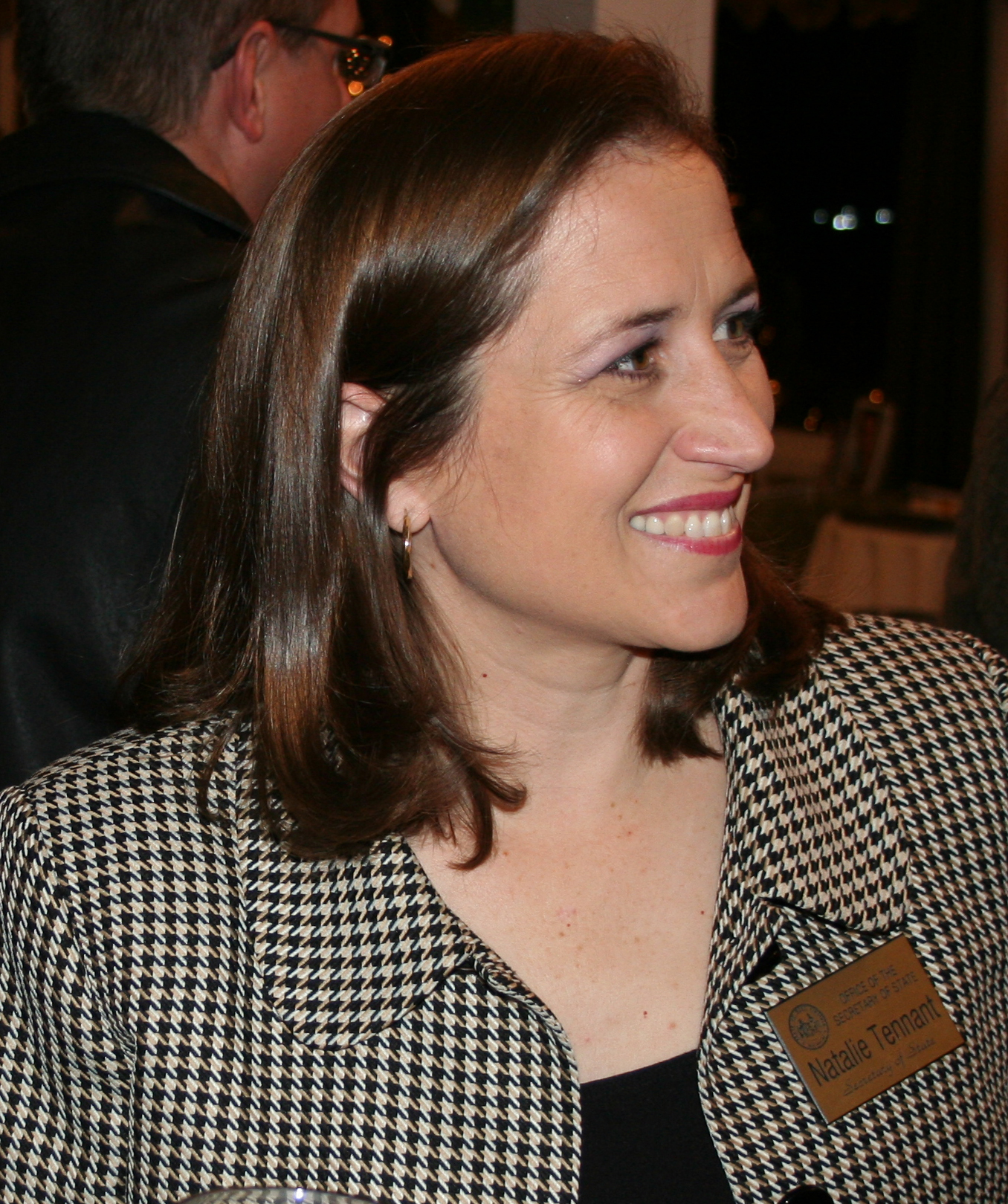

Nominee	Natalie Tennant	Brian Savilla
Party	Democratic	Republican
Popular vote	398,463	240,080
Percentage	62.40%	37.60%
- Tennant: 50–60% 60–70% 70–80% Savilla: 50–60% 60–70%
Secretary of State before election
Natalie Tennant
Democratic
Elected Secretary of State
Natalie Tennant
Democratic

The 2012 West Virginia Secretary of State election was held on November 6, 2012, to elect the Secretary of State of West Virginia. It was held concurrently with the 2012 U.S. presidential election, along with elections to the United States Senate and United States House of Representatives, as well as various state and local elections. Incumbent Democratic Secretary of State Natalie Tennant easily won re-election to a second term. As of 2026, this is the last time a Democrat was elected Secretary of State of West Virginia.

== Democratic primary ==
=== Candidates ===
==== Nominee ====
- Natalie Tennant, incumbent secretary of state

==== Results ====
Democratic primary results
Party	Candidate	Votes	%
Democratic	Natalie Tennant (incumbent)	171,471	100.0%
Total votes		171,471	100.0%

== Republican primary ==
=== Candidates ===
==== Nominee ====
- Brian Savilla, state representative

==== Results ====
Republican primary results
Party	Candidate	Votes	%
Republican	Brian Savilla	82,334	100.0%
Total votes		82,334	100.0%

== General election ==
=== Results ===
2012 West Virginia Secretary of State election
Party	Candidate	Votes	%
Democratic	Natalie Tennant (incumbent)	398,463	62.40%
Republican	Brian Savilla	240,080	37.60%
Total votes		638,543	100.0%
Democratic hold			

=== By congressional district ===
Tennant won all 3 congressional districts, including two that elected Republicans.

District	Tennant	Savilla	Representative
1st	64%	36%	David McKinley
2nd	60%	40%	Shelley Moore Capito
3rd	64%	36%	Nick Rahall
