= Energy policy of the Obama administration =

American presidential policy

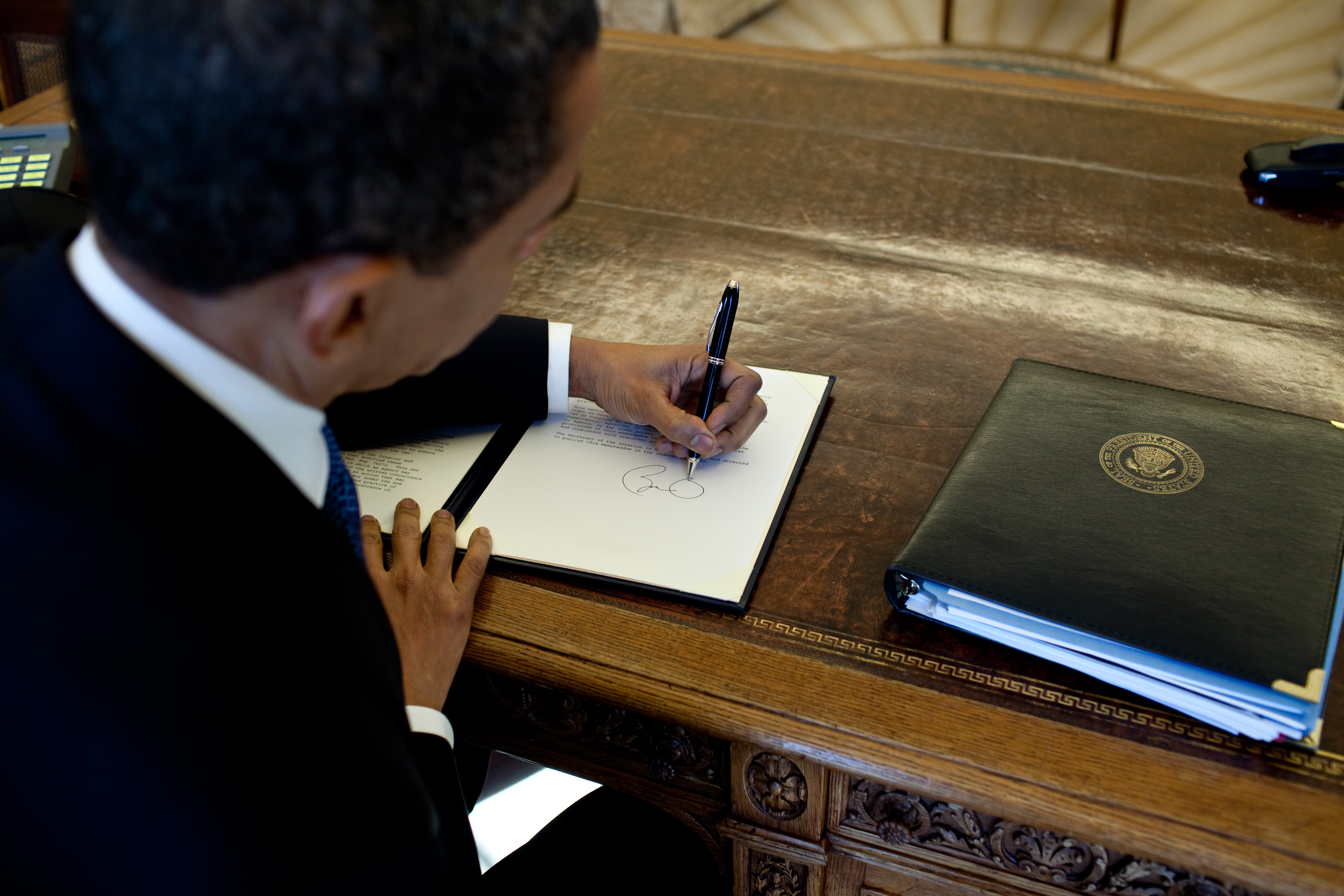
Barack Obama signing at his desk

The energy policy of the Obama administration was defined by an "all-of-the-above" approach which offered federal support for renewable energy deployment, increased domestic oil and gas extraction, and export of crude oil and natural gas. His presidency's first term was shaped by the failure of his signature climate legislation, the American Clean Energy and Security Act, to pass, and then climate and energy disasters including the Deepwater Horizon oil spill in 2010 and then Hurricane Sandy, which took place during the 2012 election. In his second term, Obama lifted the ban on crude oil exports and approved liquified natural gas exports; his planned regulatory approach to reducing greenhouse pollution in the electricity sector, the Clean Power Plan, was blocked by the U.S. Supreme Court.

On April 13, 2015, in honor of the 40th anniversary of Earth Day, the Obama Administration website summarized the initiatives that the administration was taking or had undertaken:

- A $3.4 billion Smart Grid Investment Grant (part of the American Recovery and Reinvestment Act of 2009), which would affect 49 states and has the potential to reduce electricity use by more than 4% by 2033,
- The launch of the Advanced Research Projects Agency-Energy (ARPA-E) project under the Department of Energy and in collaboration with the Department of Defense, modeled after the Defense Advanced Research Projects Agency,
- A new report on how the federal government can help create a "self-sustaining home energy efficiency retrofit industry"
- New efficiency standards for home appliances,
- A new National Fuel Efficiency Policy that will apply to cars from model years 2012-2016 and will ultimately require cars to have an average fuel efficiency of 35.5 mpg by 2016,
- Three measures to increase the production of biofuels: a renewable fuels standard, biomass crop assistance program, and a biofuels working group. The President has also created an interagency task force to help create a federal strategy for carbon capture and storage, and
- A new Environmental Protection Agency ruling (called the Mandatory Reporting of Greenhouse Gases Rule) requiring the reporting of greenhouse gas emissions by major emitters in the United States.

== Energy and the Recovery Act ==
Many of the Obama administration's were undertaken as a result of the American Recovery and Reinvestment Act of 2009, and many of those investments were specifically in sustainable energy. According to a report by Clean Edge: The Clean Tech Marketing Authority, the recovery act included more than $70 billion in tax credits and direct spending for programs involving clean energy and transportation.

The White House website stated that the recovery act provided more than $80 billion in clean energy investments:

• $111 billion for a smart grid to connect rural energy-producing sites with cities, and smarter use of energy within homes,
• $55 billion to weatherize low-income homes,
• $41.5 billion to reduce the federal government's own energy bill by making federal buildings more energy efficient,
• $62.3 billion to support state and local energy efforts,
• $6 billion to train people for green jobs, and
• $29 billion to promote investments in battery storage technologies.

Clean Edge lists other recent policies of the Obama Administration to support the clean energy sector in the U.S.:

• Extending the investment tax credit for solar energy,
• Extending the production tax credit for wind energy,
• Allowing utilities to participate in income tax credits, and
• Allowing renewable energy developers to receive government grants instead of tax credits.

In his 2011 State of the Union Address, President Obama called for a goal, "By 2035, 80 percent of America's electricity will come from clean energy sources."

In January 2017, President Obama published an article arguing that private-sector incentives will help drive decoupling of emissions and economic growth. He called this the irreversible momentum of clean energy, which he argued would occur independently of the near-term policy choices of the Trump presidency.

=== Aftermath of Japanese Earthquake and Tsunami ===
One of President Obama's suggestions for cleaner energy options was the use of nuclear power plants. But after the 2011 Tōhoku earthquake and tsunami that hit Japan and its power plants, the $54 billion in loan guarantees the president has asked Congress to approve seem doubtful.

Concerns have grown over the nuclear plants in California because, similar to Japan, they are also located on fault lines. But Per Peterson, former Chair of the nuclear-engineering department at the University of California, Berkeley has reassured people that the fault lines lack the same danger and potential of disaster as Japan.

== Energy security ==
In a speech on March 31, 2010 at Andrews Air Force Base, President Obama outlined a new energy security plan. The president's plan includes initiatives such as raising fuel efficiency standards. He also announced a decision to double the number of hybrid vehicles in the federal government's fleet, and made a decision to expand domestic offshore oil and gas exploration in Alaska, the southern and mid-Atlantic Coast, and parts of the Gulf of Mexico offshore from Florida.

Following up on Obama's speech, the White House blog released a statement on how the administration plans to boost domestic energy production, diversify America's energy portfolio, and promote clean energy innovation with three tactics:

- Landmark car and truck fuel standards
- Leading by example - Greening the federal fleet
- Department of Defense energy security strategic emphasis

Since 2008 American oil production has increased by 70%, mostly due to drilling on private or State lands (not Federal).

== Reactions and analysis of energy and climate security ==
The Center for a New American Security (CNAS) wrote recommendations on how to improve upon the energy security plan. In 2009, CNAS and its author, Christine Parthemore "convened a group of scientists, investors, business executives, academics, nonprofit representatives, defense professionals, and federal, state, and local officials to discuss how to implement President Obama’s energy and climate security goals."

CNAS recommended three strategies for the administration to help move forward with the energy security plan:

- Draft a comprehensive national strategy,
- Link that strategy to a major, systems-level demonstration project for a future, low-carbon energy economy, and
- Create a scorecard to track progress and capture lessons learned from the historical level of federal investment in energy and climate security.

== See also ==
- Climate change policy of the Obama administration
