= Betty Ireland =

American politician (born 1946)

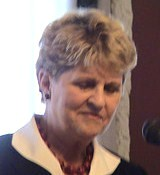

28th Secretary of State of West Virginia
- In office January 17, 2005 – January 19, 2009
- Governor: Joe Manchin
- Preceded by: Joe Manchin
- Succeeded by: Natalie Tennant

Personal details
- Born: 1946 (age 79–80) Charleston, West Virginia, U.S.
- Party: Republican
- Profession: Politician, teacher, businesswoman

Betty Ireland (born 1946) was the 28th Secretary of State of West Virginia from 2005 to 2009, as the first woman elected to the executive branch of West Virginia state government. She was also the first Republican elected to that position since 1972. Ireland did not seek a second term in 2008 due to her parents' health. On December 30, 2010, Ireland announced she would run in the 2011 West Virginia gubernatorial special election, where she came in second place in the Republican primary.

== Career ==
Early in her career, Ireland spent several years teaching in the West Virginia public school system. Eventually, she entered the business sector, when Ireland took a job as an administrative assistant with Massachusetts Mutual Life Insurance. She subsequently became a certified pension consultant.

For nearly six years (from 1977 to 1983), she was the owner of Retirement Systems & Services, a pension administration and consulting firm in Charleston, West Virginia. From 1983 to 1989, she was vice president and head of the pension division in the Trust Department of the Charleston National Bank of Commerce. Ireland moved to Jackson Kelly.

Ireland became executive director of the West Virginia Consolidated Public Retirement Board in August 1998. She returned to Jackson Kelly in 2002 to head its ancillary business endeavors as president of Jackson Kelly Solutions.

== 2004 election to Secretary of State ==
In 2004, Ireland defeated longtime political figure Ken Hechler, 52% to 48%, in a general election race, as Hechler attempted to return to the Secretary of State position he previously held for sixteen years.

== 2011 gubernatorial campaign ==
On December 30, 2010, Ireland announced her intention to run for governor in the special election that was to be held on October 4, 2011. She lost the primary election to political newcomer Bill Maloney.

== Personal life ==
Ireland has four children with her husband, Sam Haddad.

Party political offices
Vacant Title last held by Vernon R. Hayes, Jr.	Republican nominee for Secretary of State of West Virginia; 2004	Succeeded by Charles Theophilus Minimah
Political offices
Preceded by Joe Manchin III	Secretary of State of West Virginia; 2005—2009	Succeeded by Natalie Tennant
