= Joe Manchin =

American politician and businessman (born 1947)

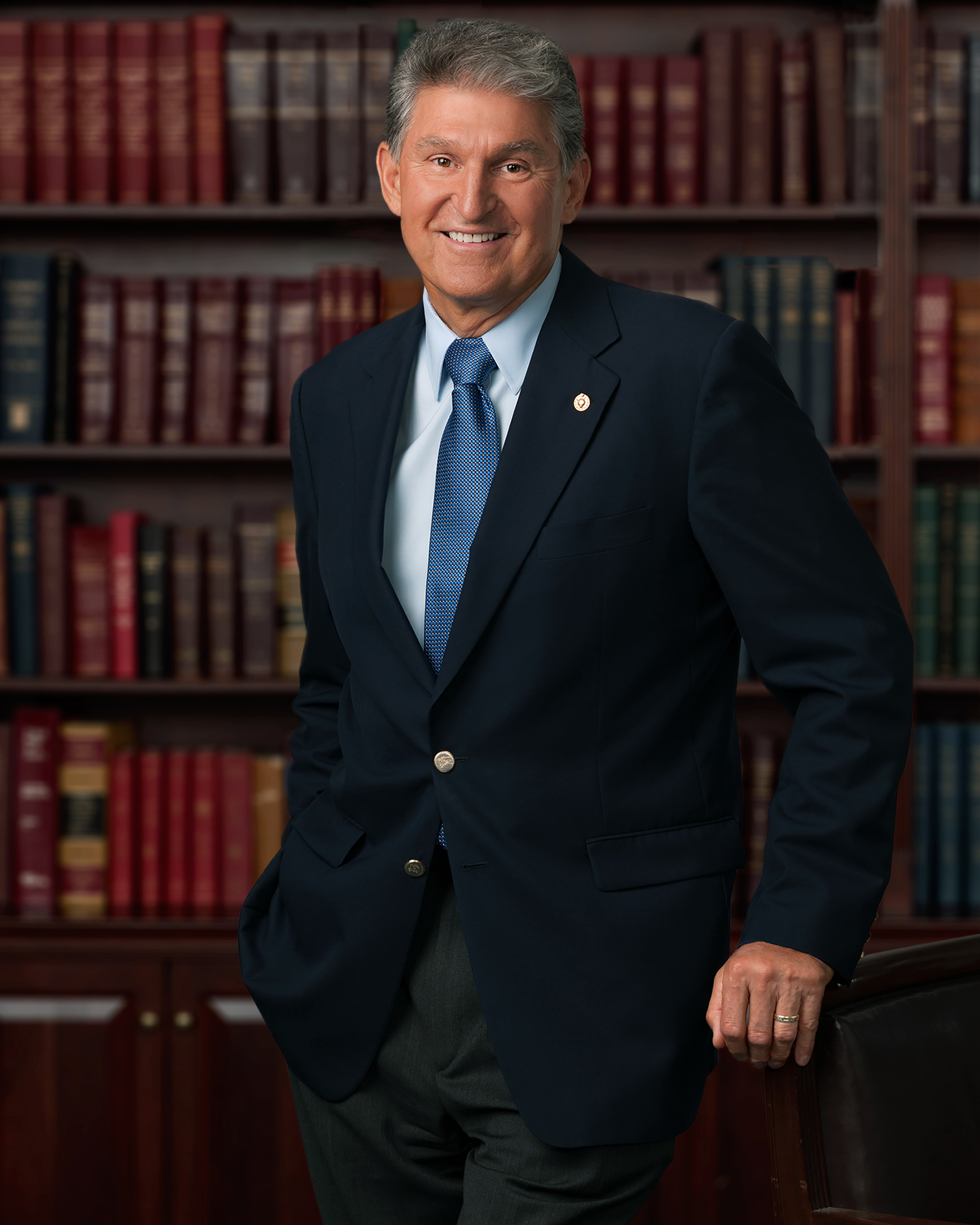
- Official portrait, 2017

United States Senator from West Virginia
- In office November 15, 2010 – January 3, 2025
- Preceded by: Carte Goodwin
- Succeeded by: Jim Justice
Senate positions
Chair of the Senate Energy Committee
In office February 3, 2021 – January 3, 2025
Preceded by	Lisa Murkowski
Succeeded by	Mike Lee
Ranking Member of the Senate Energy Committee
In office January 3, 2019 – February 3, 2021
Preceded by	Maria Cantwell
Succeeded by	John Barrasso

Chair of the National Governors Association
- In office July 11, 2010 – November 15, 2010
- Preceded by: Jim Douglas
- Succeeded by: Christine Gregoire

34th Governor of West Virginia
- In office January 17, 2005 – November 15, 2010
- Lieutenant: Earl Ray Tomblin
- Preceded by: Bob Wise
- Succeeded by: Earl Ray Tomblin

27th Secretary of State of West Virginia
- In office January 15, 2001 – January 17, 2005
- Governor: Bob Wise
- Preceded by: Ken Hechler
- Succeeded by: Betty Ireland

Member of the West Virginia Senate
- In office December 1, 1986 – December 1, 1996
- Preceded by: Anthony Yanero
- Succeeded by: Roman Prezioso
- Constituency: 14th district (1986–1992); 13th district (1992–1996)

Member of the West Virginia House of Delegates from the 31st district
- In office December 1, 1982 – December 1, 1986
- Preceded by: Clyde See
- Succeeded by: Duane Southern

Personal details
- Born: Joseph Anthony Manchin III; August 24, 1947 (age 79) Farmington, West Virginia, U.S.
- Party: Democratic (before 2024); Independent (2024–present)
- Other political affiliations: Senate Democratic Caucus (2010–2025); Independent Leadership Council (2026–present)
- Spouse: Gayle Conelly (m. 1967)
- Children: 3, including Heather
- Relatives: James Manchin (uncle); Mark Manchin (cousin); Tim Manchin (first cousin)
- Education: West Virginia University (BBA)
- Joe Manchin's voice Joe Manchin supporting the Electoral Count Reform Act. Recorded August 3, 2022

Joseph Anthony Manchin III (/ˈmæntʃɪn/ MAN-chin; born August 24, 1947) is an American politician and businessman from West Virginia. Manchin served from 2001 to 2005 as the 27th secretary of state of West Virginia, from 2005 to 2010 as the 34th governor of West Virginia, and from 2010 to 2025 as a United States senator from West Virginia. Manchin was a Democrat throughout his political career until he became an independent in 2024.

Before entering politics, Manchin co-founded and served as president of Enersystems, his family-owned and operated coal brokerage company. After serving as West Virginia's secretary of state, he was elected governor of West Virginia in 2004 by a large margin and reelected by an even larger margin in 2008. Manchin was first elected to the U.S. Senate in a 2010 special election after the death of Democratic Senator Robert Byrd. Manchin won a full Senate term in 2012 and was re-elected in 2018.

Representing a state that shifted sharply to the right throughout his political career, Manchin was generally regarded as the Senate Democratic Caucus's most conservative member and as a centrist, bipartisan figure. After the 2020 U.S. Senate elections, the Senate was left evenly split 50–50 between Democrats and Republicans. With Democrats holding control through the vice president's tiebreaking vote, Manchin emerged as a pivotal swing vote in this closely split chamber. In 2023, he announced he would not be seeking re-election in 2024. He was succeeded by Jim Justice, a Republican. In 2024, Manchin left the Democratic Party to become an independent; later he founded the Independent Leadership Council in 2026.

== Early life and education ==
Joseph Anthony Manchin III was born on August 24, 1947, in Farmington, West Virginia, a small coal mining town. He is the second of five children of Mary Olga (née Gouzd) and John Manchin. The name "Manchin" was derived from the Italian name "Mancina". His father was of Italian descent, and his paternal grandparents emigrated to the United States from the town of San Giovanni in Fiore, in Calabria. Manchin's maternal grandparents were immigrants to the US from the Moravian-Silesian Region of the Czech Republic. Charles Gouzd was born in Poruba (Orlová), and Maria Lucia (née Michalík) was born in Heřmanice (Ostrava).

Manchin's father owned a carpet and furniture store, and his grandfather, Joseph Manchin (Giuseppe Mancina), owned a grocery store. His father and his grandfather each served as mayor of Farmington. Manchin's uncle, A. James Manchin, was a member of the West Virginia House of Delegates and later served as West Virginia Secretary of State and Treasurer.

Manchin graduated from Farmington High School in 1965. He entered West Virginia University on a football scholarship in 1965, but an injury during practice ended his football career. As a result of the injury, Manchin was unable to pass his draft physical in 1967 and was deemed unfit for military service. In 1968, as a result of his family's store burning down, Manchin took one semester off to help his family rebuild the store as Manchin's Carpet Center. Manchin graduated in 1970 with a degree in business administration and went to work for his family's business. Manchin has been a close friend of former Alabama Crimson Tide football coach Nick Saban since childhood.

== Business interests ==
=== Enersystems coal brokerage ===
In 1988, Manchin founded Enersystems, a waste coal brokerage company based in Fairmont, West Virginia. Manchin was president of Enersystems until 2000, when he entered politics and gave control of the company's daily operations to his son, Joe Manchin IV. At some point during his tenure as governor, Manchin moved his Enersystems holdings into a blind trust. In a financial disclosure from 2020, Manchin reported that his non-public shares of Enersystems were worth between $1 million and $5 million and that between 2011 and 2020 he was paid $5,211,154 in dividend income from them. In 2020, he received over $500,000 in dividends. Enersystems is 71% of Manchin's investment income and 30% of his net worth.

=== Other investments ===
Since his election to the U.S. Senate in 2010, Manchin has listed AA Properties as a non-public asset on his annual financial disclosures. AA Property is reportedly 50% controlled by Manchin, and has, among other things, been an investor in Emerald Coast Realty, which owns a La Quinta hotel in Elkview, West Virginia.

== Early political career ==
Manchin was elected to the West Virginia House of Delegates in 1982 at age 35. In 1983, he introduced an unsuccessful resolution to let voters remove language in the state's constitution that enforced school segregation. Said wording would not be removed until 1994. In 1984, Manchin served as an alternate delegate for Clyde See at that year's Democratic National Convention, voting for eventual nominee Walter Mondale, even though he personally supported U.S. Senator from Colorado Gary Hart. In 1986 was elected to the West Virginia Senate, where he served until 1996. He ran for governor in 1996, losing the Democratic primary election to Charlotte Pritt. At that time, he supported the Republican candidate for governor, Cecil Underwood, who went on to win. Manchin was elected Secretary of State of West Virginia in 2000, defeating Libertarian candidate Poochie Myers, 89.4% to 10.6%.

== Governor of West Virginia ==
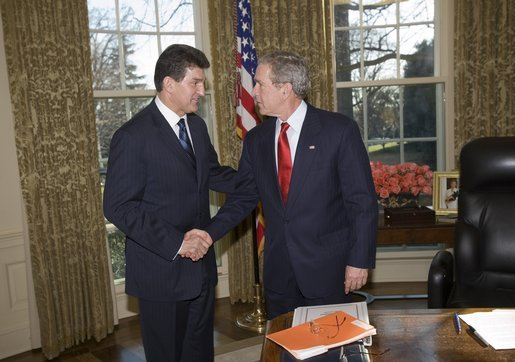
Manchin greeting President George W. Bush in 2006

In 2003, Manchin announced his intention to challenge incumbent Democratic governor Bob Wise in the 2004 Democratic primary. Wise decided not to seek reelection after a scandal, and Manchin won the Democratic primary and general election by large margins. His election marked the first time since 1964 that a West Virginia governor was succeeded by another governor from the same party.

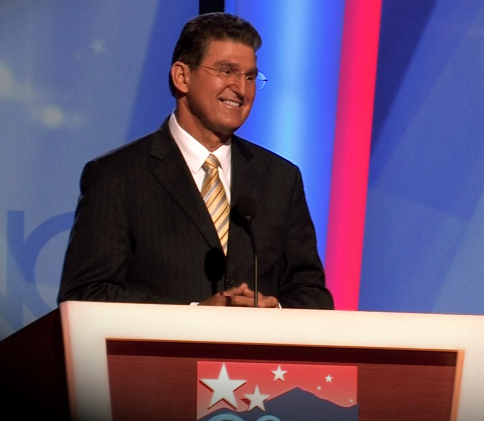
Manchin speaks during the second day of the 2008 Democratic National Convention in Denver, Colorado, in his capacity as chair of the Democratic Governors Association.

In July 2005, Massey Energy CEO Don Blankenship sued Manchin, alleging that Manchin had violated Blankenship's First Amendment rights by threatening increased government scrutiny of his coal operations in retaliation for Blankenship's political activities. Blankenship had donated substantial funds into campaigns to defeat a proposed pension bond amendment and oppose the reelection of state Supreme Court Justice Warren McGraw, and he fought against a proposed increase in the severance tax on extraction of mineral resources. Soon after the bond amendment's defeat, the state Division of Environmental Protection (DEP) revoked a permit approval for controversial new silos near Marsh Fork Elementary School in Raleigh County. While area residents had complained for some time that the coal operation there endangered their children, Blankenship claimed that the DEP acted in response to his opposition to the bond amendment.

During the Sago Mine disaster in early January 2006 in Upshur County, West Virginia, Manchin confirmed incorrect reports that 12 miners had survived; in actuality only one survived. Manchin later acknowledged that a miscommunication had occurred with rescue teams in the mine. On February 1, 2006, he ordered a stop to all coal production in West Virginia pending safety checks after two more miners were killed in separate accidents. Sixteen West Virginia coal miners died in mining accidents in early 2006.

Manchin easily won reelection to a second term as governor in 2008 against Republican Russ Weeks, capturing 69.81% of the vote and winning every county.

== U.S. Senate ==
=== Elections ===
==== 2010 ====
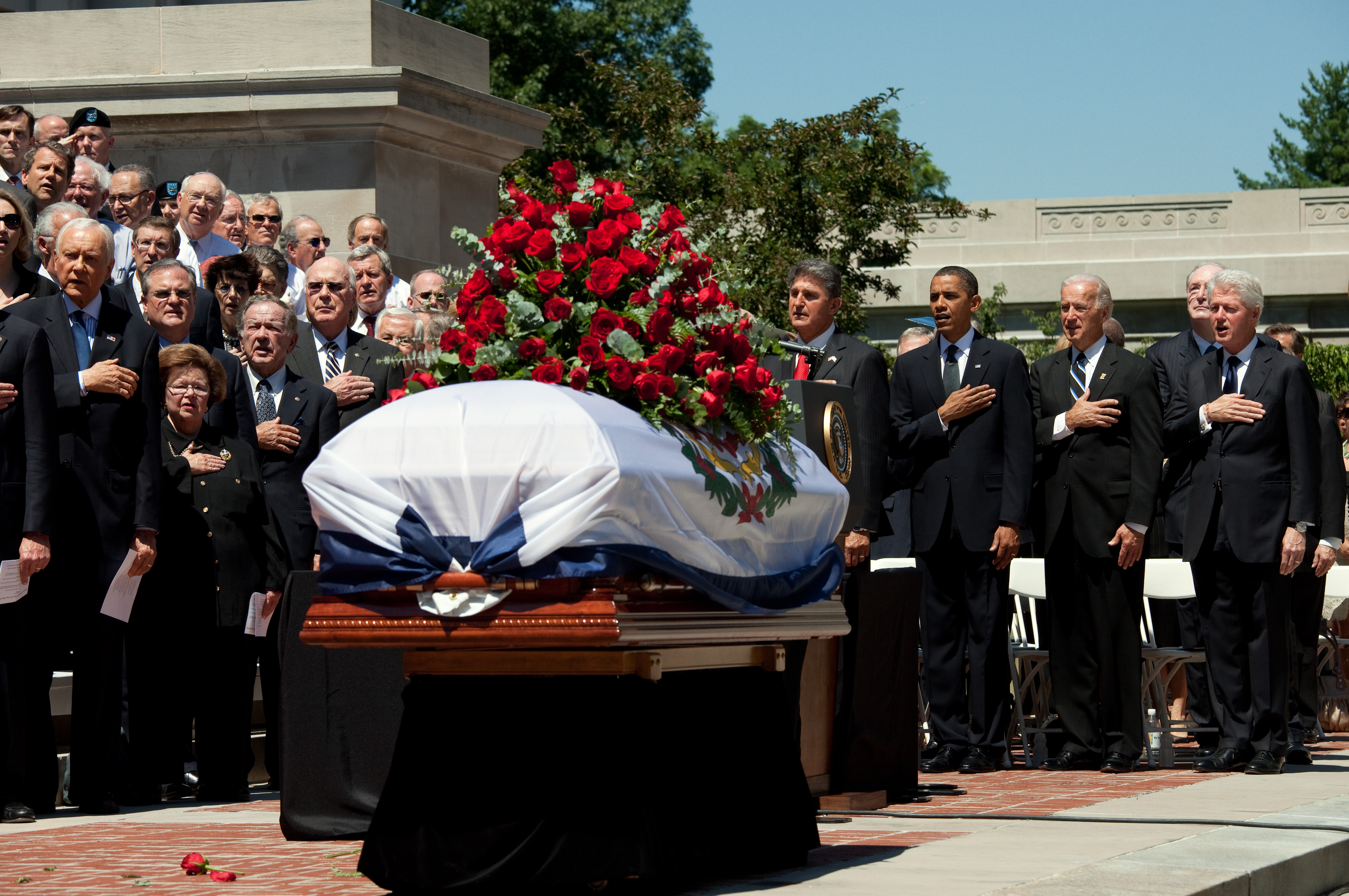
Memorial service for Robert Byrd at the State Capitol in Charleston, West Virginia, July 2, 2010

Due to Senator Robert Byrd's declining health, there was speculation about what Manchin would do if Byrd died. Manchin refused to comment on the subject until Byrd's death, except to say that he would not appoint himself to the Senate. Byrd died on June 28, 2010, and Manchin appointed Carte Goodwin, his 36-year-old legal adviser, to the Senate on July 16.

On July 20, 2010, Manchin announced he would seek the Senate seat in a special election for the remaining two years of Byrd's term. In the August 28 Democratic special primary, he defeated former Democratic congressman and former West Virginia Secretary of State Ken Hechler. In the special general election, he defeated Republican businessman John Raese, 53.5%-43.4%.

==== 2012 ====
Manchin ran for reelection to a full-term in 2012. According to the Democratic firm Public Policy Polling, early polling found Manchin heavily favored, leading Representative Shelley Moore Capito 50–39, 2010 opponent John Raese 60–31, and Congressman David McKinley 57–28. Manchin did not endorse President Barack Obama for reelection in 2012, saying that he had "some real differences" with the presumptive nominees of both major parties. Manchin found fault with Obama's economic and energy policies and questioned Romney's understanding of the "challenges facing ordinary people".

Manchin defeated Raese and Mountain Party candidate Bob Henry Baber, winning 61% of the vote.

==== 2018 ====
In 2018, Manchin ran for reelection. He was challenged in the Democratic primary by Paula Jean Swearengin. Swearengin is an activist and coal miner's daughter who was supported by former members of Bernie Sanders's 2016 presidential campaign. She criticized Manchin for voting with Republicans and supporting Trump's policies. Manchin won the primary with 70% of the vote.

On the Republican side, Manchin was challenged by West Virginia Attorney General Patrick Morrisey. In August 2017, Morrisey publicly asked Manchin to resign from the Senate Democratic leadership. Manchin responded, "I don't give a shit, you understand?" to a Charleston Gazette-Mail reporter. "I just don't give a shit. Don't care if I get elected, don't care if I get defeated, how about that?"

Manchin won the November 6 general election, defeating Morrisey 49.57%-46.26%.

==== 2024 ====
Manchin did not run for reelection in 2024. He indicated that he would not be leaving politics, saying he would be "traveling the country and speaking out, to see if there is an interest in creating a movement to mobilize the middle, and bring Americans together".

On May 31, 2024, Manchin announced that he would leave the Democratic Party and file as an independent but would remain a member of the Senate Democratic Caucus, alongside fellow independent Senators Bernie Sanders, Angus King, and Kyrsten Sinema. (Note: Sinema still caucused with the Democrats to receive committee assignments, but she did not attend or vote in caucus meetings.) By remaining in the Senate Democratic Caucus, Manchin remained chair of the Senate Energy Committee for the remainder of the 118th United States Congress. In the statement issued alongside his announcement filing as an independent, Manchin accused both the Republican and Democratic parties of "partisan extremism" and of "leaving West Virginia behind for partisan politics". He said that to "stay true to myself and remain committed to put country before party, I have decided to register as an independent with no party affiliation and continue to fight for America's sensible majority". With his decision, the Senate had the most independents in a single Congress since the ratification of the 17th Amendment.

=== Tenure ===
==== Obama years (2010–2017) ====
Manchin was first sworn in to the U.S. Senate by Vice President Joe Biden on November 15, 2010, succeeding interim senator Carte Goodwin. In a 2014 interview with New York Times, Manchin said his relationship with Obama was "fairly nonexistent."

==== Trump years (2017–2021) ====
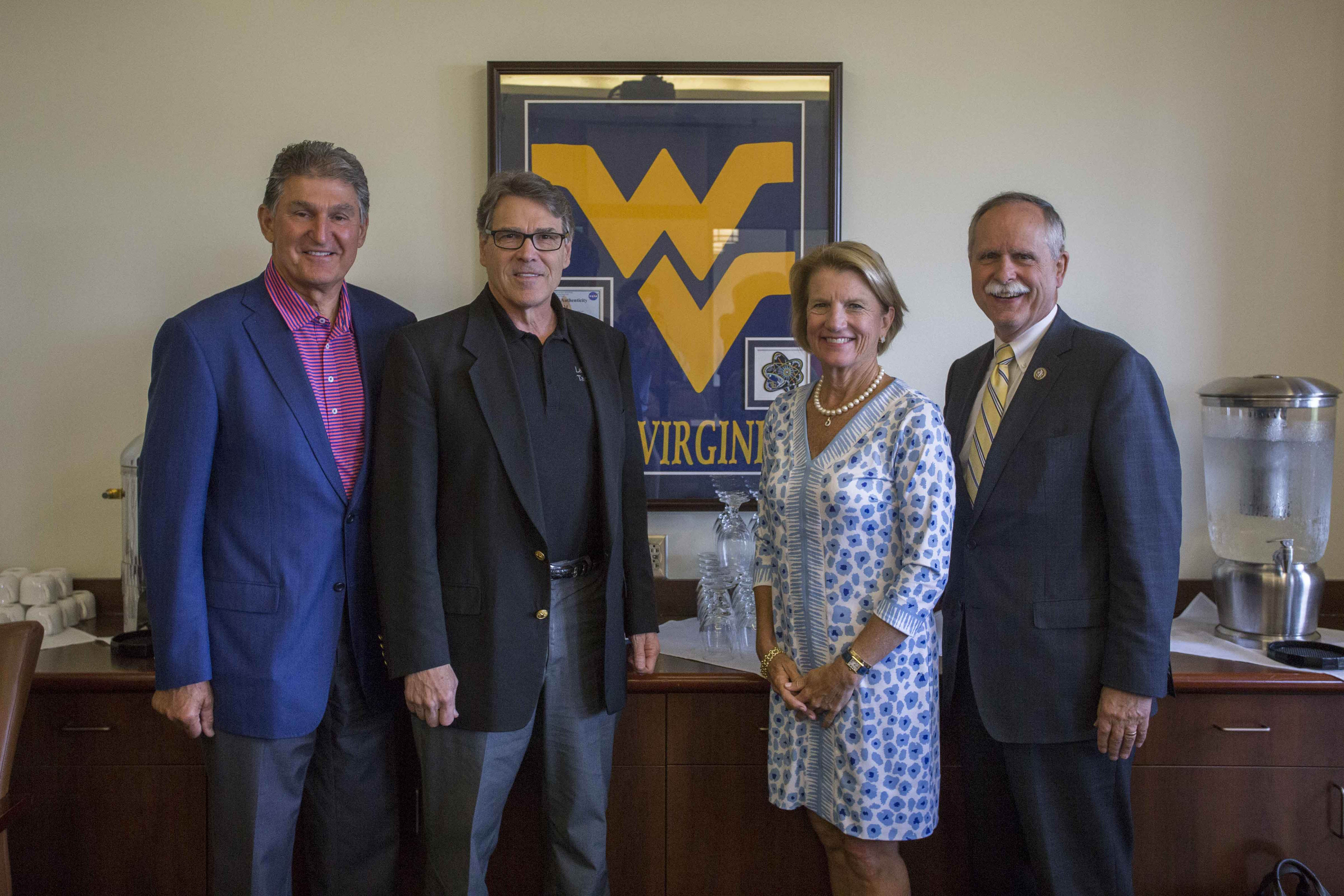
Manchin with Rick Perry, Shelley Moore Capito, and David McKinley in 2017

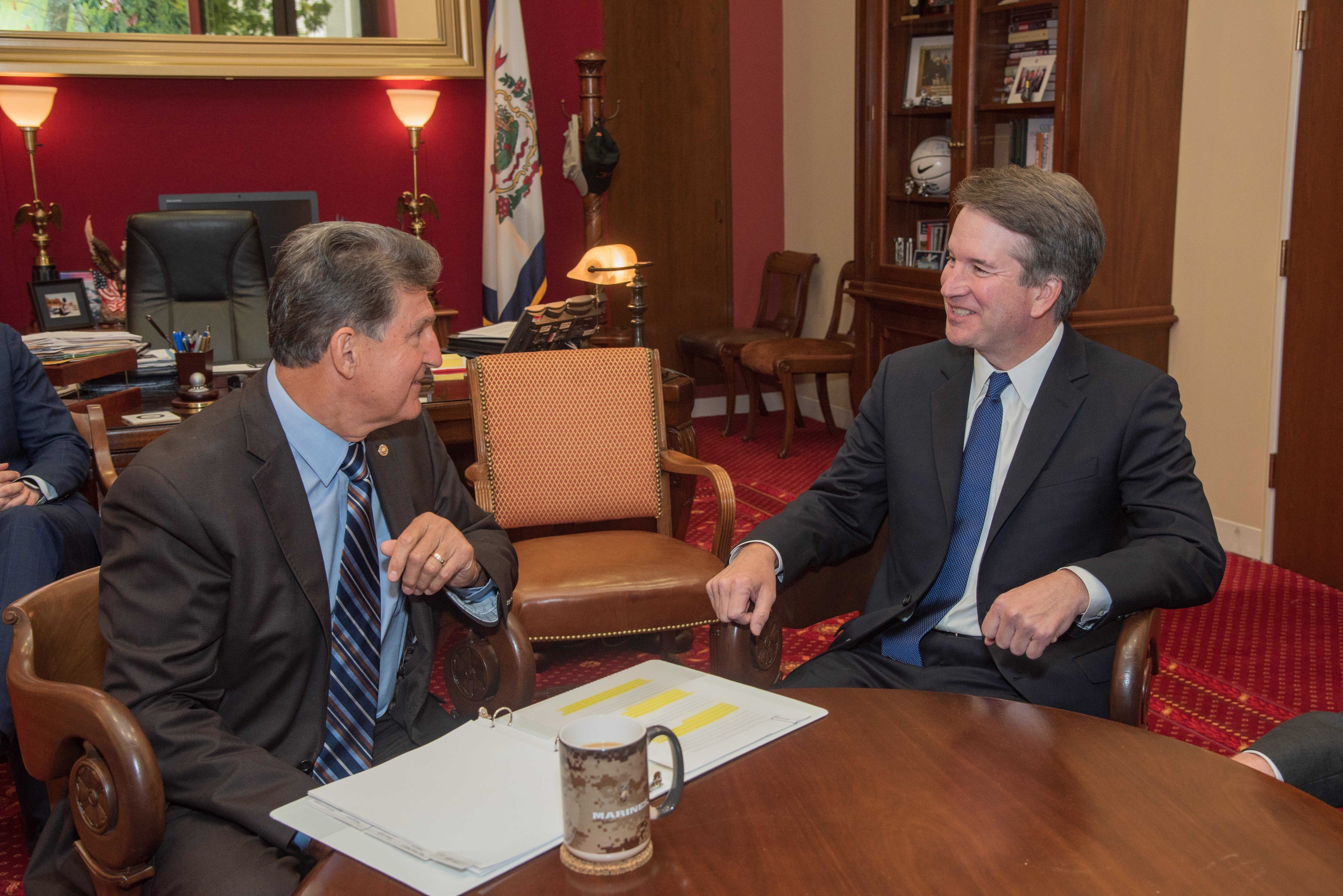
Manchin with Brett Kavanaugh in 2018

According to FiveThirtyEight, which tracks congressional votes, Manchin voted with Trump's position 50.4% of the time during his presidency.

Manchin initially welcomed Trump's presidency, saying, "He'll correct the trading policies, the imbalance in our trade policies, which are horrible." He supported the idea of Trump "calling companies to keep them from moving factories overseas". Manchin voted for most of Trump's cabinet nominees. He was the only Democrat to vote to confirm Attorney General Jeff Sessions and Treasury Secretary Steven Mnuchin, one of two Democrats to vote to confirm Scott Pruitt as EPA Administrator, and one of three to vote to confirm Secretary of State Rex Tillerson.

Manchin voted for Trump's first two Supreme Court nominees, Neil Gorsuch and Brett Kavanaugh. In the former case, he was one of three Democrats (alongside Joe Donnelly and Heidi Heitkamp) to vote to confirm; in the latter case, he was the only one. He opposed the nomination of Amy Coney Barrett, citing the closeness to the upcoming presidential election.

Manchin voted to convict in both Trump impeachment trials.

==== Biden years (2021–2025) ====
According to data journalism site FiveThirtyEight, Manchin had voted with Biden's position 87.9% of the time as of January 2023. Because the Senate was evenly divided between Democratic and Republican members during the early portion of the Biden administration, Manchin's ability to deny Democrats a majority made him very influential.

In December 2021, Manchin signaled that he was not likely to vote for the Biden-supported Build Back Better Act, saying, "I cannot vote to continue with this piece of legislation. I just can't. I've tried everything humanly possible. I can't get there." Manchin named growing inflation, the national debt, and the Omicron variant of the SARS-CoV-2 virus as reasons for opposition. White House Press Secretary Jen Psaki responded that Manchin's comments "represent a sudden and inexplicable reversal in his position, and a breach of his commitments to the president and the senator's colleagues in the House and Senate".

In December 2021, Manchin expressed displeasure with the tactics Democrats used in their attempts to pressure him into supporting the Build Back Better Act. In an interview with Politico, he said, "They figure, 'surely to God we can move one person. Surely, we can badger and beat one person up.' Well, guess what? I'm from West Virginia. I'm not from where they're from, [where] they can just beat the living crap out of people and think they'll be submissive... I just got to the wit's end... It's not the president, it's the staff. They drove some things and they put some things out that were absolutely inexcusable".

In January 2022, The Hill reported that Manchin "spent heavily on private security" during the last three months of 2021 "as he became a prime target for progressive protesters angry at his role blocking a reconciliation package in the Senate". According to The Hill, "climate change protesters surrounded Manchin's car in a parking garage in early November. In October, protesters in kayaks swarmed Manchin's yacht, parked at a Washington marina where he lives". Furthermore, "a source close to Manchin told The Hill the senator and his family had been subjected to specific threats, both in Washington and in West Virginia".

On March 25, 2022, Manchin announced that he would vote to confirm Ketanji Brown Jackson to the Supreme Court.

Negotiations between Manchin and Senate Majority Leader Chuck Schumer eventually resulted in the Inflation Reduction Act of 2022, which incorporated some of the Build Back Better Act's climate change, healthcare, and tax reform proposals while excluding its social safety net proposals. Manchin expressed his support for the Inflation Reduction Act on July 27, 2022. On August 7, 2022, the Senate passed the Inflation Reduction Act on a 51–50 vote, with Manchin voting in favor and Vice President Kamala Harris breaking a tie. On August 16, 2022, President Joe Biden signed the Act into law.

On November 9, 2023, Manchin announced that he would not seek reelection in 2024. He said that his decision was made "after months of deliberation and long conversations" with his family, adding that he would instead be "traveling the country and speaking out to see if there is an interest in creating a movement to mobilize the middle and bring Americans together".

In early 2024, Manchin announced he was registering as independent, and later that year announced he would not run for reelection, but did not rule out running for office in the future. Manchin said his biggest regret during Biden's presidency was voting for the American Rescue Plan, saying that it helped increase inflation.

Manchin was succeeded by West Virginia Governor Jim Justice, a Republican.

==== Committee assignments ====
- Committee on Appropriations
  - Subcommittee on Commerce, Justice, Science, and Related Agencies
  - Subcommittee on Financial Services and General Government
  - Subcommittee on Labor, Health and Human Services, Education, and Related Agencies
  - Subcommittee on Military Construction, Veterans Affairs, and Related Agencies
  - Subcommittee on Transportation, Housing and Urban Development, and Related Agencies
- Committee on Energy and Natural Resources (chair)
  - As chair of the full committee, Manchin serves as an ex officio member of all subcommittees.
- Committee on Armed Services
  - Subcommittee on Cybersecurity
  - Subcommittee on Strategic Forces
- Committee on Veterans' Affairs

==== Previous committee assignments ====
- Committee on Appropriations (2017–2025)
- Committee on Armed Services (2010–2025)
- Special Committee on Aging (2011–2013; 2013–2015)
- Committee on Banking, Housing, and Urban Affairs (2013–2015)
- Committee on the Budget (2010–2011)
- Committee on Commerce, Science, and Transportation (2015–2017)
- Committee on Energy and Natural Resources (2011–2025)
- Committee on Health, Education, Labor, and Pensions (2010–2011)
- Committee on Rules and Administration (2010–2011)
- Committee on Veterans' Affairs (2015–2025)
- Select Committee on Intelligence (2017–2019)
- Joint Select Committee on Solvency of Multiemployer Pension Plans (2019–2021)

=== Caucus memberships ===
- Congressional Coalition on Adoption
- Senate Taiwan Caucus

=== Funding ===
Manchin received the most funding from the oil and gas industry of any senator from May 2020 to May 2021, including $1.6 million in donations from fossil fuel PACs. He also received funding from individuals and PACs connected to law and real estate, among others.

In June 2021, ExxonMobil lobbyist Keith McCoy said that Manchin was one of its key targets for funding and that he participated in weekly meetings with the company.

On September 30, 2021, an MSNBC news reporter asked Manchin about his opposition to the Build Back Better Act, accusing him of having a conflict of interest with provisions within the bill: "Sir, the company you founded, Enersystems, provides coal to power plants that would be impacted by one of the proposals in the plan. How is that not a conflict of interest?" Manchin replied, "I've been in a blind trust for 20 years. I have no idea what they're doing."

== Presidential politics ==
In 2023, Manchin "stoked rumors about his presidential ambitions by holding a call with No Labels supporters and meeting with influential community leaders from Iowa, a state that holds outsized sway in guiding the trajectory of the presidential primaries". In May 2023, and again in June 2023, he refused to rule out running for president of the United States as a third-party candidate in 2024. Reports indicated that the centrist group No Labels was seeking to support a third-party presidential campaign and that the organization viewed Manchin as a potential candidate.

As of 2023, Manchin served as a No Labels National Co-chair, and on July 17, 2023, he and former U.S. Ambassador to Russia Jon Huntsman Jr. headlined a No Labels Common Sense Agenda Town Hall in Manchester, New Hampshire.

On February 15, 2024, during a City Club of Cleveland forum, he said he would pick U.S. senator Mitt Romney or former U.S. senator Rob Portman as his running mate if he ran for president.

On February 16, 2024, Manchin announced that he would not run for president.

After President Biden withdrew from the 2024 race on July 21, 2024, Manchin expressed interest in running for president at the 2024 Democratic National Convention. He opted not to run, but stated that he would have preferred that the convention be an open contest. After Kamala Harris picked Tim Walz as her running mate, Manchin said, "I can think of no one better than Governor Walz to help bring our country closer together", although he refrained from formally endorsing the Harris-Walz ticket, citing Harris's call to end the filibuster in the United States Senate.

Manchin said in September 2025 that he ruled out a run because No Labels wanted a Republican on their presidential ticket.

In a September 2025 interview with The New York Times, Manchin expressed openness to the possibility of running for president as a third-party candidate in the 2028 U.S. presidential election.

== Political positions ==
Manchin is regarded as a centrist, bipartisan figure. He opposed Democratic President Barack Obama's energy policies, including his reductions and restrictions on coal mining. He supported Republican President Donald Trump's border wall and immigration policies and voted to confirm most of Trump's cabinet and judicial appointees, including Justices Neil Gorsuch and Brett Kavanaugh. He also opposed Democratic President Joe Biden's For the People Act and Build Back Better Act. Conversely, Manchin voted against repeated attempts to repeal Obama's Affordable Care Act, voted against the Tax Cuts and Jobs Act of 2017 during the first Trump administration, voted to convict Trump in both of his impeachment trials, voted against the confirmation of Trump Supreme Court nominee Amy Coney Barrett, voted to confirm Biden Supreme Court nominee Ketanji Brown Jackson, and sponsored the Inflation Reduction Act during the Biden administration.

== Legacy ==
From 2021 until he became an independent in 2024, Manchin was the only Democrat holding congressional or statewide partisan office in West Virginia. Although Democrats have not won West Virginia in a presidential election since 1996, or even a single county in the state since 2008, Manchin held his U.S. Senate seat from 2010 to 2025.

Manchin's legacy has been described as complicated, including by Manchin himself.

In September 2018, GQ called Manchin "the last Democrat in Trump country." In October 2021, Richard Luscombe wrote in The Guardian that Manchin was a Democrat in name only because he opposed Biden's Build Back Better Act. In November 2023, the Associated Press called Manchin "the last in a line of formidable West Virginia Democrats who promoted coal interests", in line with Manchin's predecessors such as Robert Byrd, Jay Rockefeller, and Jennings Randolph.

Senator Jon Tester said, "Manchin is going to be remembered as somebody who has been difficult to work with, but got a lot of things done". Tester unsuccessfully tried to persuade Manchin to change the Senate filibuster. Journalist Burgess Everett said Manchin's "name is now synonymous with any single member of Congress who's willing to hold up an entire party's agenda".

After Kamala Harris lost the 2024 United States presidential election to Donald Trump, Manchin criticized many of the Democratic Party's positions and said that its brand was "toxic." Manchin said he will remain an independent and had no plans to run for political office in the future.

== Post-Senate career ==
A memoir, Dead Center: In Defense of Common Sense, was released on September 16, 2025. In it, Manchin revealed that he was glad Republicans won control of the Senate in 2024.

In June 2026, Manchin launched a political organization called the Independent Leadership Council, which aims to elect independents to Congress. The organization is led by Manchin, his daughter, business executive Heather Bresch, author Adam Brandon, and Seth Cohen.

== Personal life ==
Manchin is a member of the National Rifle Association and a licensed pilot. He married Gayle Heather Conelly on August 5, 1967. Together they have three children: Heather Manchin Bresch, Joseph IV, and Brooke. Manchin is Catholic.

In 2006 and 2010, Manchin delivered commencement addresses at Wheeling Jesuit University and at Davis & Elkins College, receiving honorary degrees from both institutions.

In December 2012, Manchin voiced his displeasure with MTV's new reality show Buckwild, which was set in his home state's capital of Charleston. He asked the network's president to cancel the show, contending that it depicted West Virginia in a negative, unrealistic fashion. The show ended after its first season.

In a lawsuit filed in July 2014, John Manchin II, one of Manchin's brothers, sued Manchin and his other brother, Roch Manchin, over a $1.7 million loan. The lawsuit alleged that Joe and Roch Manchin borrowed the money to keep the doors open at the family-owned carpet business run by Roch, that no part of the loan had yet been repaid, and that the defendants had taken other measures to evade compensating John Manchin II for non-payment. John Manchin II withdrew the suit on June 30, 2015.

As of 2018, according to OpenSecrets.org, Manchin's net worth was more than $7.6 million.

As of 2022, Manchin lived on a yacht in the Potomac River when in Washington, and his net worth was estimated to be $12 million.

== Electoral history ==
1982

West Virginia House of Delegates 31st district Democratic primary, 1982
Party	Candidate	Votes	%
Democratic	Joe Manchin, III	7,687	21.15%
Democratic	Cody A. Starcher (incumbent)	6,844	18.83%
Democratic	William E. Stewart	6,391	17.59%
Democratic	Samuel A. Morasco	4,250	11.70%
Democratic	Nick Fantasia	5,072	13.96%
Democratic	Donald L. Smith	3,276	9.02%
Democratic	J. Lonnie Bray	2,819	7.76%
Total votes		36,339	100.0%

West Virginia House of Delegates 31st district general election, 1982 (Note: Prior to 2022, members of the West Virginia House of Delegates were elected from multi-member districts. Since voters could vote for multiple candidates, there is no percentage.)
Party	Candidate	Votes	%
Democratic	Joe Manchin	16,160	N/A
Democratic	Cody A. Starcher (incumbent)	16,110	N/A
Democratic	William E. Stewart	15,090	N/A
Republican	Benjamin N. Springston (incumbent)	12,166	N/A
Republican	Paul E. Prunty (incumbent)	14,620	N/A
Democratic	Samuel A. Morasco	11,741	N/A
Republican	Edgar L. Williams III	5,702	N/A
Republican	Lyman Clark	5,270	N/A
Democratic hold			

1986

West Virginia State Senate 14th district Democratic primary, 1986 (unexpired term)
Party	Candidate	Votes	%
Democratic	Joe Manchin, III	10,691	56.53%
Democratic	Jack May	8,220	43.47%
Total votes		18,911	100.0%

West Virginia State Senate 14th district general election, 1986 (unexpired term)
Party	Candidate	Votes	%
Democratic	Joe Manchin, III	17,284	65.87%
Republican	Lyman Clark	8,955	34.13%
Total votes		26,239	100.0%
Democratic hold			

1988

West Virginia State Senate 14th district Democratic primary, 1988
Party	Candidate	Votes	%
Democratic	Joe Manchin III (incumbent)	13,932	63.58%
Democratic	Anthony J. Yanero	7,981	36.42%
Total votes		21,913	100.0%

West Virginia State Senate 14th district general election, 1988
Party	Candidate	Votes	%
Democratic	Joe Manchin III (incumbent)	29,792	100.00%
Total votes		29,792	100.00%
Democratic hold			

1992

West Virginia State Senate 13th district Democratic primary, 1992
Party	Candidate	Votes	%
Democratic	Joe Manchin III (incumbent)	17,238	100.00%
Total votes		17,238	100.00%

West Virginia State Senate 13th district general election, 1992
Party	Candidate	Votes	%
Democratic	Joe Manchin III (incumbent)	33,218	100.00%
Total votes		33,218	100.00%
Democratic hold			

1996

1996 West Virginia gubernatorial Democratic primary
Party	Candidate	Votes	%
Democratic	Charlotte Pritt	130,107	39.54%
Democratic	Joe Manchin	107,124	32.56%
Democratic	Jim Lees	64,100	19.48%
Democratic	Larrie Bailey	15,733	4.78%
Democratic	Bobbie Edward Myers	3,038	0.92%
Democratic	Lyle Sattes	2,931	0.89%
Democratic	Bob Henry Baber	1,456	0.44%
Democratic	Louis J. Davis	1,351	0.41%
Democratic	Frank Rochetti	1,330	0.40%
Democratic	Richard E. Koon	1,154	0.35%
Democratic	Fred Schell	733	0.22%
Total votes		329,057	100.00%

2000

2000 West Virginia Secretary of State Democratic primary
Party	Candidate	Votes	%
Democratic	Joe Manchin, III	141,839	51.08%
Democratic	Charlotte Pritt	80,148	28.86%
Democratic	Mike Oliverio	35,424	12.76%
Democratic	Bobby Nelson	20,259	7.30%
Total votes		277,670	100.00%

2000 West Virginia Secretary of State election
Party	Candidate	Votes	%
Democratic	Joe Manchin, III	478,489	89.44%
Libertarian	Poochie Myers	56,477	10.56%
Total votes		534,966	100.00%
Democratic hold			

2004

2004 West Virginia gubernatorial Democratic primary
Party	Candidate	Votes	%
Democratic	Joe Manchin	149,362	52.73%
Democratic	Lloyd M. Jackson II	77,052	27.20%
Democratic	Jim Lees	40,161	14.18%
Democratic	Lacy Wright, Jr.	4,963	1.75%
Democratic	Jerry Baker	3,009	1.06%
Democratic	James A. Baughman	2,999	1.06%
Democratic	Phillip Frye	2,892	1.02%
Democratic	Lou Davis	2,824	1.00%
Total votes		283,262	100.00%

2004 West Virginia gubernatorial election
Party	Candidate	Votes	%	±%
Democratic	Joe Manchin	472,758	63.51%	+13.39%
Republican	Monty Warner	253,131	34.00%	−13.21%
Mountain	Jesse Johnson	18,430	2.48%	+0.87%
Write-in		114	0.02%	+0.01%
Margin of victory		219,627	29.50%	+26.58%
Total votes		744,433		
Democratic hold		Swing		

2008

2008 West Virginia gubernatorial Democratic primary
Party	Candidate	Votes	%
Democratic	Joe Manchin (incumbent)	264,775	74.62%
Democratic	Mel Kessler	90,074	25.38%
Total votes		354,849	100.00%

2008 West Virginia gubernatorial election
Party	Candidate	Votes	%	±%
Democratic	Joe Manchin (incumbent)	492,697	69.81%	+6.30%
Republican	Russ Weeks	181,612	25.73%	−8.27%
Mountain	Jesse Johnson	31,486	4.46%	+1.99%
Margin of victory		311,085	44.08%	+14.57%
Total votes		705,795	100%	
Democratic hold		Swing		

2010

2010 United States Senate special election in West Virginia Democratic primary
Party	Candidate	Votes	%
Democratic	Joe Manchin	67,498	72.9%
Democratic	Ken Hechler	16,039	17.3%
Democratic	Sheirl Fletcher	9,035	9.8%
Total votes		92,572	100.0%

2010 United States Senate special election in West Virginia results
Party	Candidate	Votes	%	±%
Democratic	Joe Manchin	283,358	53.47%	−10.96%
Republican	John Raese	230,013	43.40%	+9.69%
Mountain	Jesse Johnson	10,152	1.92%	+0.06%
Constitution	Jeff Becker	6,425	1.21%	N/A
Majority		53,345	10.07%	
Total votes		529,948	100%	
Democratic hold				

2012

2012 United States Senate election in West Virginia Democratic primary
Party	Candidate	Votes	%
Democratic	Joe Manchin (incumbent)	163,891	79.9%
Democratic	Sheirl Fletcher	41,118	20.1%
Total votes		205,009	100%

2012 United States Senate election in West Virginia
Party	Candidate	Votes	%	±%
Democratic	Joe Manchin (incumbent)	399,908	60.57%	+7.10%
Republican	John Raese	240,787	36.47%	−6.93%
Mountain	Bob Henry Baber	19,517	2.96%	+1.04%
Total votes		660,212	100.0%	N/A
Democratic hold				

2018

2018 United States Senate election in West Virginia Democratic primary
Party	Candidate	Votes	%
Democratic	Joe Manchin (incumbent)	112,658	69.86%
Democratic	Paula Jean Swearengin	48,594	30.14%
Total votes		161,252	100%

2018 United States Senate election in West Virginia
Party	Candidate	Votes	%	±%
Democratic	Joe Manchin (incumbent)	290,510	49.57%	−11.0%
Republican	Patrick Morrisey	271,113	46.26%	+9.79%
Libertarian	Rusty Hollen	24,411	4.17%	N/A
Total votes		586,034	100%	N/A
Democratic hold				

== Notes ==
Party political offices
Preceded by Ken Hechler	Democratic nominee for Secretary of State of West Virginia; 2000	Succeeded by Ken Hechler
Preceded by Bob Wise	Democratic nominee for Governor of West Virginia; 2004, 2008	Succeeded by Earl Ray Tomblin
Preceded by Kathleen Sebelius	Chair of the Democratic Governors Association; 2007–2008	Succeeded by Brian Schweitzer
Preceded by Robert Byrd	Democratic nominee for U.S. Senator from West Virginia (Class 1); 2010, 2012, 2018	Succeeded by Glenn Elliott
Preceded by Debbie Stabenow	Vice Chair of the Senate Democratic Policy Committee; 2017–2019	Succeeded by Himself
Preceded by Himself	Vice Chair of the Senate Democratic Policy and Communications Committee; 2019–2025; Served alongside: Cory Booker (2021–2025)	Succeeded by Jeanne Shaheen as Vice Chair of the Senate Democratic Steering and Policy Committee
Preceded by Himself	Vice Chair of the Senate Democratic Policy and Communications Committee; 2019–2025; Served alongside: Cory Booker (2021–2025)	Succeeded by Tina Smith as Vice Chair of the Senate Democratic Strategic Communications Committee
Political offices
Preceded by Ken Hechler	Secretary of State of West Virginia; 2001–2005	Succeeded by Betty Ireland
Preceded by Bob Wise	Governor of West Virginia; 2005–2010	Succeeded by Earl Ray Tomblin
Preceded by Jim Douglas	Chair of the National Governors Association; 2010	Succeeded by Christine Gregoire
U.S. Senate
Preceded by Carte Goodwin	United States Senator (Class 1) from West Virginia; 2010–2025; Served alongside: Jay Rockefeller, Shelley Moore Capito	Succeeded by Jim Justice
Preceded by Maria Cantwell	Ranking Member of the Senate Energy Committee; 2019–2021	Succeeded by John Barrasso
Preceded by Lisa Murkowski	Chair of the Senate Energy Committee; 2021–2025	Succeeded by Mike Lee
U.S. order of precedence (ceremonial)
Preceded by Sam Brownback as Former U.S. Senator	Order of precedence of the United States as Former U.S. Senator	Succeeded by Rick Santorum as Former U.S. Senator
