= A. James Manchin =

American politician (1927–2003)

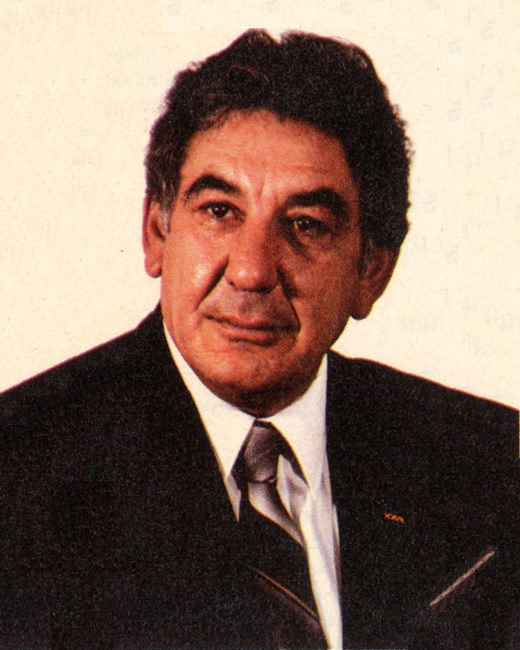
- Official portrait, c. 1983

21st West Virginia State Treasurer
- In office January 14, 1985 – July 9, 1989
- Governor: Arch A. Moore Jr.
- Preceded by: Larrie Bailey
- Succeeded by: Thomas Loehr

25th West Virginia Secretary of State
- In office January 17, 1977 – January 14, 1985
- Governor: Jay Rockefeller
- Preceded by: James R. McCartney
- Succeeded by: Ken Hechler

Member of the West Virginia House of Delegates
- In office December 1, 1998 – November 3, 2003 Serving with: Mike Caputo (1998–2003); Paul Prunty (1998–2002); Donna R. Renner (2002–2003)
- Preceded by: Nick Fantasia
- Succeeded by: Tim Manchin
- Constituency: 43rd district
- In office December 1, 1948 – December 1, 1950 Serving with Fred Doringer & Clarence Hall
- Preceded by: Francis R. Stewart
- Succeeded by: George W. May
- Constituency: Marion County

Personal details
- Born: Antonio James Manchin; April 7, 1927 Farmington, West Virginia, U.S.
- Died: November 3, 2003 (aged 76) Fairmont, West Virginia, U.S.
- Party: Democratic
- Spouse: Stella Machel Petros
- Children: 3, including Mark
- Education: West Virginia University
- Occupation: High school teacher

Military service
- Branch/service: United States Navy
- Battles/wars: World War II

Antonio James Manchin (April 7, 1927 – November 3, 2003) was a West Virginia Democratic politician who served as a member of the House of Delegates (1948–50; 1998–2003), as Secretary of State (1977–85), and as State Treasurer (1985–89); he resigned as Treasurer a day before his impeachment trial. He was the uncle of future West Virginia Governor and U.S. Senator Joe Manchin.

== Early life ==
Manchin was born in Farmington, West Virginia to Kathleen and Joseph Manchin I. His parents were of Italian descent. He was educated in the schools of Marion County and was elected to the West Virginia House of Delegates in 1948 at age 21, but was defeated for re-election in 1950.

In 1951, Manchin received his bachelor's degree in political science and sociology from West Virginia University. In 1953, he received his teaching certification from Fairmont State College. He spent most of the 1950s working as a high school teacher and wrestling coach. In 1962, he received his master's degree in education from West Virginia University.

== Early career ==
In 1961, President John F. Kennedy appointed Manchin to serve as state director of the Farmers Home Administration and in 1970 he was appointed special assistant to the National Administrator of the Farmers Home Administration.

In 1972, he ran for West Virginia Secretary of State when incumbent Jay Rockefeller retired to run for governor. In the seven-candidate Democratic primary, he finished second with 18% of the vote, behind Thomas Winner who won with a plurality of 20% of the vote. After the election, Governor Arch A. Moore Jr. in 1973 appointed him to direct the Rehabilitation Environmental Action Program (REAP), a successful effort which rid the State of more than 100,000 junked cars as well as numerous appliances. He would visit schools and ask students for help by joining his “REAP Regiment.”

== Statewide office ==
In 1976, Manchin ran again for Secretary of State and defeated incumbent Republican James R. McCartney 55%–45%. In 1980, he won re-election with 71% of the vote.

Elected State Treasurer in 1984, he created the Teddi Program, which brought 28,000 new jobs to West Virginia. He was impeached by the House of Delegates on March 30, 1989, amid a controversy over bad investments that lost the state $279 million mainly during the time period between April and June 1987. The impeachment resolution blamed Manchin for negligence in delegating and supervising the investment fund, making improper investments and covering up losses.

Though he initially vowed to stay in office, conviction by the Senate would have meant losing his eligibility to run for office again, and could have cost him his pension. He resigned before his impeachment trial before the State Senate was completed.

== West Virginia legislature (1998–2003) ==
=== Elections ===
He returned to the House of Delegates in 1998, where he served until his death from a massive heart attack in 2003.

=== Tenure ===
The House of Delegates called him "a flamboyant character of the first magnitude" and praised his love of ceremony in their resolution honoring him after his death.

=== Committee assignments ===
- Government Organization
- Roads and Transportation
- Veteran Affair (Vice Chair)
- Enrolled Bills (Chair)

== Personal life ==
Manchin was married to Stella Machel Petros and had three children. One of his sons, Mark, is Harrison County, West Virginia Superintendent of Schools. A Roman Catholic, A. James Manchin served as a lector at his church.

Party political offices
Preceded by Thomas A. Winner	Democratic nominee for Secretary of State of West Virginia; 1976, 1980	Succeeded by Ken Hechler
Preceded by Larrie Bailey	Democratic nominee for West Virginia State Treasurer; 1984, 1988	Succeeded by Thomas E. Loehr
Political offices
Preceded by James R. McCartney	West Virginia Secretary of State; 1977—1985	Succeeded by Ken Hechler
Preceded by Larrie Bailey	West Virginia State Treasurer; 1985—1989	Succeeded by Thomas E. Loehr
