= Ken Hechler =

American politician (1914–2016)

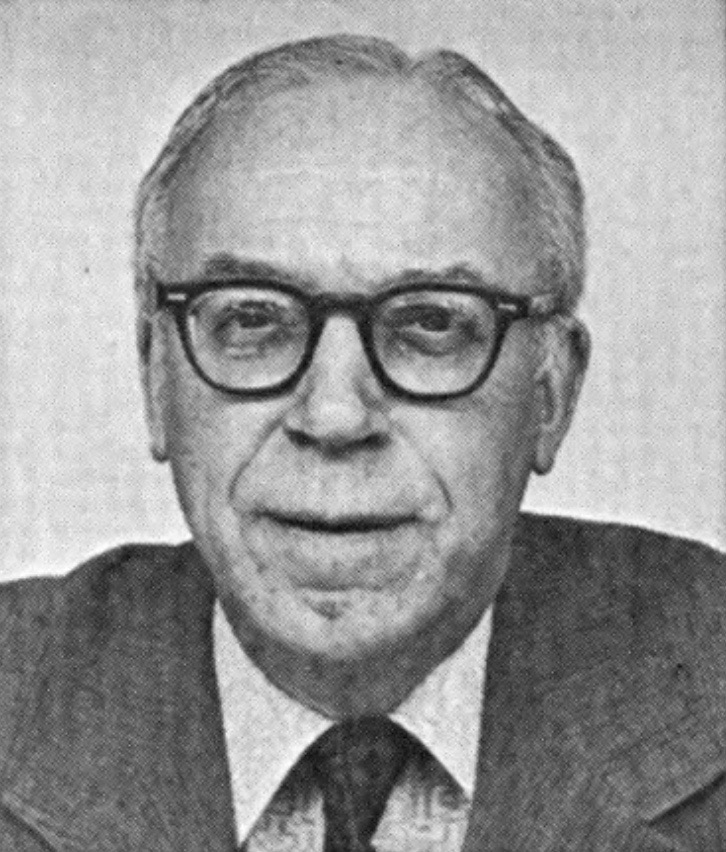

26th Secretary of State of West Virginia
- In office January 14, 1985 – January 15, 2001
- Governor: Arch A. Moore, Jr. Gaston Caperton; Cecil H. Underwood
- Preceded by: A. James Manchin
- Succeeded by: Joe Manchin

Member of the U.S. House of Representatives from West Virginia's 4th district
- In office January 3, 1959 – January 3, 1977
- Preceded by: Will E. Neal
- Succeeded by: Nick Rahall

Personal details
- Born: Kenneth William Hechler; September 20, 1914 Roslyn, New York, U.S.
- Died: December 10, 2016 (aged 102) Romney, West Virginia, U.S.
- Party: Democratic
- Spouse: Carol Denise Kitzmiller (m. 2013)
- Education: Swarthmore College; Columbia University

Military service
- Allegiance: United States
- Branch/service: United States Army
- Years of service: 1942–1945
- Rank: Major
- Unit: 9th Armored Division
- Battles/wars: World War II
- Awards: Bronze Star

Kenneth William Hechler (September 20, 1914 – December 10, 2016) was a liberal American politician. A member of the Democratic Party, he represented West Virginia's 4th congressional district in the U.S. House of Representatives from 1959 to 1977 and was West Virginia Secretary of State from 1985 to 2001.

== Biography ==
=== Early life and military service ===
Of German-American descent, Hechler was born in Roslyn, New York, on September 20, 1914, to Charles Henry and Catherine Elizabeth (Hauhart) Hechler. He held a BA from Swarthmore College, and an MA and PhD from Columbia University in history and government. Hechler served on the faculty of Columbia University, Princeton University, and Barnard College in the years leading up to World War II.

Hechler held a series of minor appointed positions in the federal civil service until he was drafted into the United States Army during World War II in July, 1942. After graduation from Armored Force Officer Candidate School, he was assigned as a combat historian in the European Theater of Operations. Hechler helped chronicle the liberation of France, the 1944 Normandy invasion, Battle of the Bulge, and entrance into Nazi Germany. He was attached to the 9th Armored Division when an armored and infantry task force, part of Combat Command B, unexpectedly captured the Ludendorff Bridge spanning the Rhine River during the Battle of Remagen. He interviewed both U.S. and German soldiers involved at the time. He was awarded a Bronze Star and 5 battle stars. He returned after the war twice to interview Germans who took part in the battle. He found Captain Willi Bratge, whom a German military court had sentenced to death in absentia because he had been captured, and spent a week with him in the Remagen area learning about details of the battle. In 1957 he published the book The Bridge at Remagen: The Amazing Story of March 7, 1945, which was adapted into a film in 1969.

After the war ended, he was assigned to interview many of the defendants prior to the Nuremberg Trials, including Hermann Göring. (Hechler recorded him making a delusional offer to join the American side and "knock hell out of the Russians.")

=== Entry into politics ===
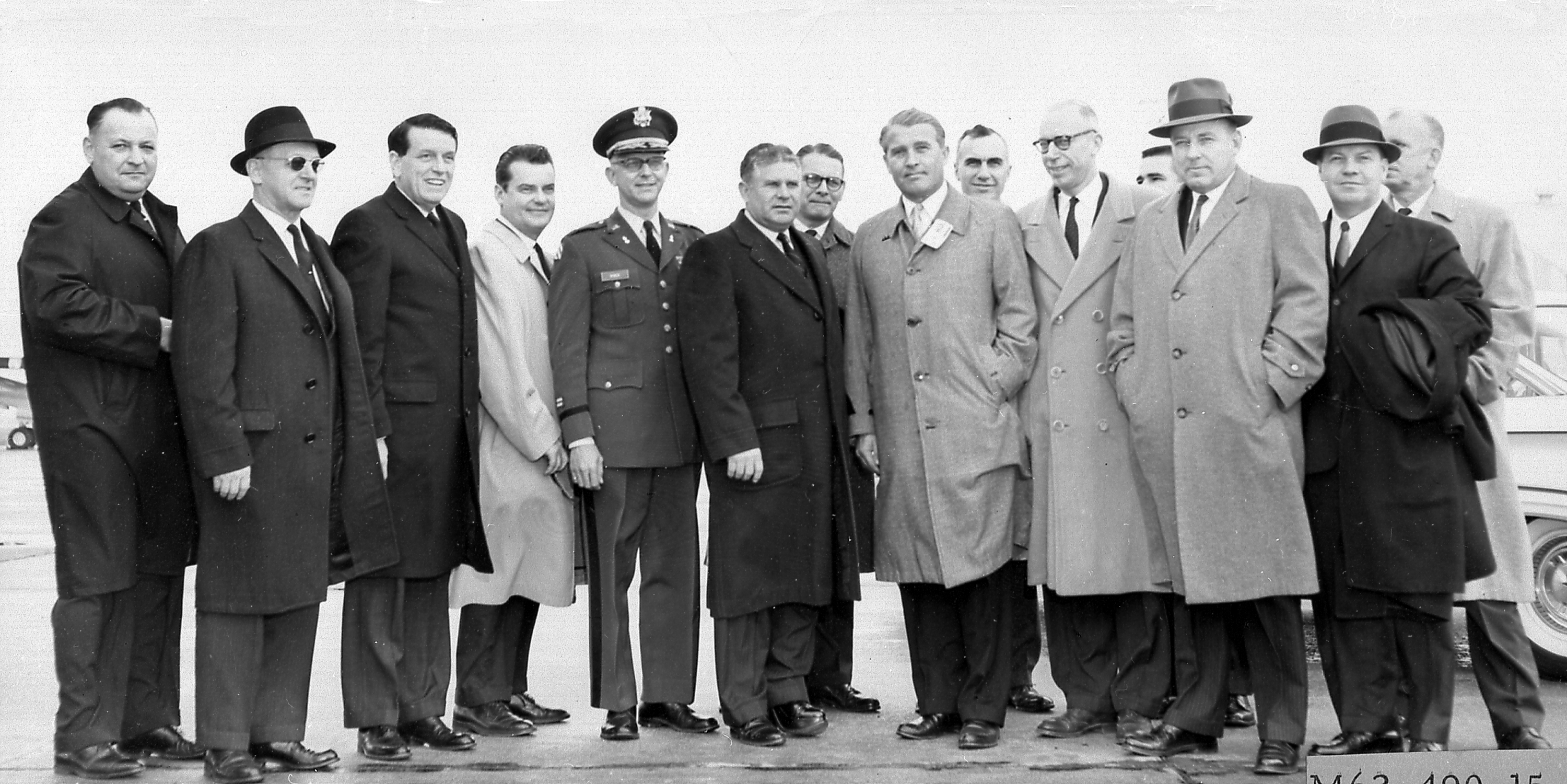
Representative Hechler and other members of the House Committee on Science and Astronautics visit the Marshall Space Flight Center on March 9, 1962, to gather first-hand information of the nation's space exploration program.

Next Hechler was a White House assistant to Harry S. Truman from 1949 to 1953 and Research Director for Adlai Stevenson's 1956 Presidential campaign. From 1953 to 1957 he was associate director of the American Political Science Association in Washington, DC. Hechler then was appointed to the faculty at Marshall University in Huntington, West Virginia. He ran for the United States House of Representatives from West Virginia's Fourth Congressional District, which then included Huntington and many unionized mill towns along the Ohio River north of that industrial city, in 1958. He won a narrow victory by 3,500 votes. He never faced another general election contest anywhere near that close.

In Congress, he earned a reputation as a liberal Democrat and in 1965, he was the only member of Congress to join Martin Luther King Jr. on the Selma to Montgomery marches. Hechler voted in favor of the Civil Rights Acts of 1960, 1964, and 1968, and the Voting Rights Act of 1965. In 1971, Hechler was the sole member in the state's congressional delegation to vote for the Equal Employment Opportunity Act. He was the principal architect of the Coal Mine Safety and Health Act of 1969, which for the first time put a ceiling on the amount of respirable coal dust allowed in coal mines, and stipulated stringent safety regulations. Though an opponent of the state Democratic machine, he faced little opposition in Democratic primaries and was reelected eight times.

=== Election of 1972 ===
In 1972, Hechler faced a strong primary challenge for the first time since his initial run for the seat. Following the 1970 United States census, West Virginia's declining population cost it a congressional district. The state legislature merged Hechler's district with most of the old 5th District, comprising several coal-mining counties around Bluefield and Beckley. The 5th had been represented by Democrat James Kee of Bluefield since 1965, and had been in the hands of the Kee family without interruption since 1933. While the new district retained Hechler's district number–the 4th–it was geographically and demographically more Kee's district. Kee retained 65 percent of his former territory. Hechler had been a longtime opponent of the state Democratic machine, and the legislature responded by attempting to draw his seat out from under him. However, Hechler made the most of his union ties and routed Kee in the Democratic primary by almost 26 points. He easily won reelection in November, and was unopposed for reelection in 1974.

=== Running for governor ===
In 1976, he entered a multi-candidate primary for governor, but lost that statewide race by a large margin. He then attempted a write-in campaign in his old district against the Democratic nominee, Nick Rahall. Rahall was a follower and former staffer for Robert Byrd. He lost to Rahall in a close election, taking 36 percent of the vote and pushing the Republican candidate into third place, and lost again to Rahall in the Democratic primary of 1978. Following these unsuccessful political bids, Hechler resumed his teaching career at Marshall University, the University of Charleston and West Virginia State University.

=== Later career ===
In 1984 Hechler ran for West Virginia Secretary of State and won. He was re-elected in 1988, 1992, and 1996. In 1990, he again ran, in the middle of his Secretarial term, for his old Congressional seat, but was defeated by Rahall in the primary. His term as Secretary of State is most known for his successful prosecution of Johnie Owens, who sold his position as Sheriff of Mingo County for $100,000 and was sentenced to fourteen years in federal prison. He also persuaded the West Virginia State Legislature to require that candidates publicly register loans, with specific terms of repayment. There was a growing rift between him and union leaders over his support of tough environmental laws, thought by union leaders to be at the cost of jobs.

As secretary of state, in 1985 he moved his legal residence to Charleston. Charleston is located in the 2nd District, which was vacated in 2000 by nine-term Democrat Bob Wise, who was running for governor. Hechler lost a three-way Democratic primary bid for that seat. In 2000, at the age of 85, he walked 530 miles in joining Doris "Granny D" Haddock in her cross country walk on behalf of campaign finance reform, shortly before the passage of the McCain–Feingold Act.

In 2004 he ran yet again for his old post as secretary of state. This time, he won the Democratic primary by a plurality, but lost the general election to Republican Betty Ireland.

=== After the 2004 election ===
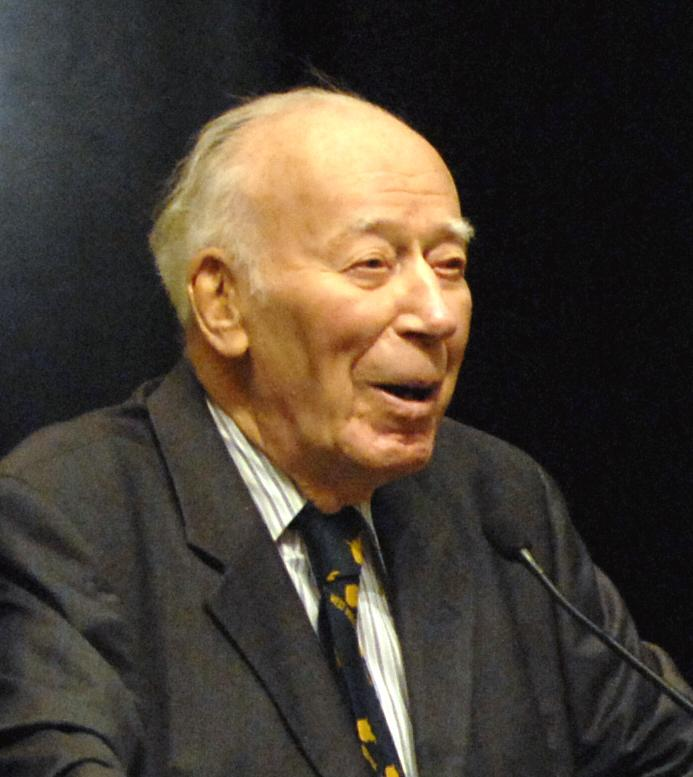
Hechler in 2008

Beginning in 2004, Hechler campaigned against mountaintop removal mining. On June 23, 2009, Hechler, then aged 94, participated in a protest near mountaintop removal mining sites in the West Virginia coalfields in the Coal River valley along with others. He was one of 29 protesters arrested for trespass.

On July 21, 2010, Hechler filed to run in the special election to succeed the late Senator Robert Byrd, running in the primary against Gov. Joe Manchin. Hechler indicated that his primary goal in entering the race was to draw attention to what he viewed as the devastating impact of mountaintop removal mining in West Virginia. Hechler lost to Manchin, with less than 20% of the vote. He then endorsed Jesse Johnson of the Mountain Party for the Senate seat in the general election.

One of his last public political endorsements was of Charlotte Pritt for Governor of West Virginia in 2016. Pritt, whom Hechler often publicly referred to as one of his proteges, was running this time as the nominee of the Mountain Party. Hechler had supported Pritt in her two other bids for Governor as a Democrat in 1992 and 1996 (when she was the nominee.) Pritt later gave one of the eulogies at his Memorial Service after his death.

On August 12, 2013, Hechler, at the age of 98, married his long-time companion, Carol Kitzmiller, in Winchester, Virginia. On September 20, 2014, he turned 100. "The secret of longevity is to exercise," Hechler said. "I always exercised on the tennis court until I had to give that up, but I've got a new hip." In July 2016, Hechler was placed into hospice care in Romney, West Virginia, after suffering from a recurring lung infection. Hechler died on December 10, 2016, at his home in Romney from a stroke at the age of 102.

== Works ==
- Ken Hechler, The Enemy Side of the Hill: The 1945 Background on the Interrogation of German Commanders as Seen Subjectively by Major Kenneth W. Hechler, U.S. Dept. of the Army (1949)
- Ken Hechler, The Bridge at Remagen, Ballantine, First edition (January 1, 1957)
  - The Bridge at Remagen (Presidio War Classic; World War II), Presidio Press (July 26, 2005), ISBN 978-0-89141-860-3
  - The Bridge at Remagen: The Amazing Story of March 7, 1945 - The Day the Rhine River was Crossed, Pictorial Histories Pub, Rev Sub edition (December 30, 1993), ISBN 978-0-929521-79-4
- Ken Hechler, Endless Space Frontier: A History of the House Committee on Science and Astronautics, 1959-1978 (Aas History Series), Univelt (February 1982), ISBN 978-0-87703-157-4
- Ken Hechler, Working With Truman, Putnam Adult; First Edition (November 19, 1982), ISBN 978-0-399-12762-5
  - Ken Hechler, Working With Truman: A Personal Memoir of the White House Years (Give 'em Hell Harry Series), University of Missouri Press (March 1996), ISBN 978-0-8262-1067-8
- Ken Hechler, Holding the line the 51st Engineer Combat Battalion and the Battle of the Bulge, December 1944-January 1945 (SuDoc D 103.43/4:4), Office of History, U.S. Army Corps of Engineers (1988)
  - Ken Hechler, Holding the Line, University Press of the Pacific (January 30, 2005), ISBN 978-1-4102-1962-6
- Ken Hechler, River-Horse: The Logbook of a Boat Across America, Penguin Books (1991)
- Ken Hechler, Hero of the Rhine: The Karl Timmermann Story, Pictorial Histories Publishing Company, (January 1, 2004), ISBN 978-1-57510-110-1
- Ken Hechler, Super Marine!: The Sgt. Orland D. "Buddy" Jones Story, Pictorial Histories Publishing Company (January 2007), ISBN 978-1-57510-135-4

Party political offices
Preceded by A. James Manchin	Democratic nominee for Secretary of State of West Virginia; 1984, 1988, 1992, 1996	Succeeded by Joe Manchin
Preceded by Joe Manchin	Democratic nominee for Secretary of State of West Virginia; 2004	Succeeded by Natalie Tennant
U.S. House of Representatives
Preceded by Will E. Neal	Member of the U.S. House of Representatives from West Virginia's 4th congressional district 1959–1977	Succeeded by Nick Rahall
Political offices
Preceded by A. James Manchin	Secretary of State of West Virginia; 1985–2001	Succeeded by Joe Manchin III
Honorary titles
Preceded by Perkins Bass	Oldest living United States representative (Sitting or former); October 25, 2011 – December 10, 2016	Succeeded by John S. Wold
