= West Virginia State Treasurer =

Position in state government

State Treasurer of West Virginia
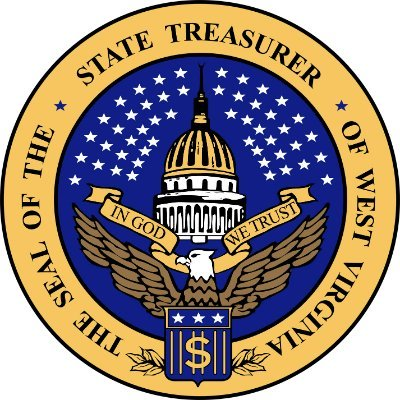
- Seal of the West Virginia state treasurer
- Incumbent; Larry Pack since January 3, 2025
- Style: The Honorable
- Term length: Four years, no term limit
- Inaugural holder: Campbell Tarr; 1863
- Formation: Constitution of West Virginia
- Website: State Treasurer's Office

The West Virginia state treasurer is the state's chief financial officer. It is one of six constitutionally mandated offices. Elected statewide for a four year term, the treasurer is responsible for overseeing state operating funds, monitoring state debt and performing banking and accounting duties in accordance with state law. The state treasurer also serves on several state government financial boards.

== Qualifications ==
In accordance with the West Virginia State Constitution, qualifications for state treasurer include being a citizen of West Virginia who is entitled to vote, and who has been a resident of West Virginia for at least the preceding five years. There are no limits on the number of terms the state treasurer can serve.

In the event of a vacancy, the governor is authorized to appoint a treasurer until a special election can be held for the remainder of the term. In making the appointment, the governor is required to choose from a list of three nominees submitted by the executive committee of the state party to which the previous treasurer belonged. If the nominees are not submitted within 15 days, the governor is empowered to appoint within five days a qualified nominee of the previous treasurer's party.

== History and functions ==
The state treasurer's office was created at the 1863 Constitutional Convention that founded the state of West Virginia. The functions of the state treasurer's office are detailed in various sections of the West Virginia Code.

The state treasurer is the state's chief financial officer and has responsibility for the cash management of West Virginia’s government. Duties include:

- Receiving and disbursing state funds
- Filing and retaining paid checks and state bonds
- Collecting crime victim's compensation, law enforcement training, regional jail authority and litter control fund fees
- Disbursing coal, oil and gas severance taxes, liquor taxes, wine taxes and the fire and casualty insurance premium tax to local governments
- Issuing quarterly and annual reports state debt reports
- Providing safekeeping
- Other banking and accounting functions related to state finances

Another role of the state treasurer is membership on several state government financial boards. The treasurer serves as chair of the Board of Treasury Investments and Prepaid Tuition and Savings Program Board of Trustees. In addition, the treasurer serves on the:

- Agricultural Land Protection Authorities Board of Trustees
- Board of Public Works
- Board of the School Fund
- Consolidated Public Retirement Board
- Council of Finance and Administration
- Enterprise Resource Planning Board
- Higher Education Student Financial Aid Advisory Board
- Hospital Finance Authority
- Housing Development Fund Board of Directors
- Investment Management Board
- Lending and Credit Rate Board
- Municipal Bond Commission
- Purchasing Card Advisory Committee
- Special Reclamation Fund Advisory Council
- Tobacco Settlement Finance Authority

== List of West Virginia state treasurers ==
Individuals who have served as West Virginia state treasurer include:

1. 1863-1866 – Campbell Tarr (R-Brooke)
2. 1866-1868 – Jacob H. Brister (R-Taylor)
3. 1868-1870 – James A. MaCauley (R-Ohio)
4. 1870-1876 – John S. Burdette (D-Taylor)
5. 1876-1876 – Sobieski Brady (D-Ohio)
6. 1876-1880 – Thomas J. West (D-Harrison)
7. 1880-1884 – Thomas O'Brien (D-Ohio)
8. 1884-1892 – William T. Thompson (D-Cabell)
9. 1892-1896 – John M. Rowan (D-Monroe)
10. 1896-1900 – M. A. Kendall (R-Wood)
11. 1900-1904 – Peter Silman (R-Kanawha)
12. 1904-1908 – Newton Ogden (R-Pleasants)
13. 1908-1916 – E. Leslie Long (R-McDowell)
14. 1916-1932 – William S. Johnson (R-Fayette)
15. 1932-1950 – Richard E. Talbott (D-Barbour)
16. 1950-1956 – William H. Ansel Jr. (D-Hampshire)
17. 1956-1960 – Orel J. Skeen (D-Jackson)
18. 1960-1975 – John H. Kelly (D-Kanawha)
19. 1975-1976 – Ronald G. Pearson (R-Marion)
20. 1976-1984 – Larrie Bailey (D-Marion)
21. 1984-1989 – A. James Manchin (D-Marion)
22. 1989-1990 – Thomas E. Loehr (D-Wetzel)
23. 1990-1996 – Larrie Bailey (D-Marion)
24. 1996-2021 – John D. Perdue (D-Kanawha)
25. 2021-2025 – Riley Moore (R-Jefferson)
26. 2025-present – Larry Pack (R-Charleston)
