= 2024 West Virginia elections =

West Virginia elections 2024

- November 5, 2024
- Registered: 1,209,977
- Turnout: 63.69% (▲20.78%)
- General election turnout by county 40–50% 50–60% 60–70% 70–80%

West Virginia held elections on November 5, 2024. Primary elections were held on May 14, 2024.

Each partisan statewide election was won by Republicans with more than 61% of votes, while the Republican supermajorities in both state legislative chambers increased. This resulted in every state-level and federal-level office in West Virginia being held by Republicans for the first time since the 1920s.

== Federal offices ==
=== President ===
Republican presidential candidate Donald Trump carried every county in West Virginia, for the third election in a row. Trump won the state with nearly 70% of votes, the largest percentage of the vote ever for any presidential candidate in West Virginia history. West Virginia was his strongest state in 2016 and his second-strongest state in 2020.

=== Senate ===
Incumbent senator Joe Manchin announced that he would not run for reelection in 2024. Manchin was the only state-wide elected Democrat in West Virginia before he left the party and became an independent in early 2024.

Term-limited incumbent governor Jim Justice won the Republican party primary over U.S. representative Alex Mooney. Justice went on to receive 68% of the vote in the general election, defeating mayor of Wheeling Glenn Elliott.

=== House of Representatives ===
In the first district, incumbent Carol Miller won the election with 66% of the vote, returning her to office for her fourth term.

In the second district, incumbent Alex Mooney announced his retirement in order to run for the United States Senate. Republican candidate Riley Moore, the incumbent state Treasurer, won the election with 71% of the vote.

== Governor ==
Incumbent Republican governor Jim Justice was term-limited and instead ran for the United States Senate. Republican candidate and incumbent Attorney General Patrick Morrisey won the election with 62% of the vote.

2024 West Virginia gubernatorial election
Party	Candidate	Votes	%
Republican	Patrick Morrisey	459,300	61.99%
Democratic	Steve Williams	233,976	31.58%
Constitution	S. Marshall Wilson	16,828	2.27%
Libertarian	Erika Kolenich	21,228	2.87%
Mountain	Chase Linko-Looper	9,596	1.30%
Write-in		10	0.00%
Total votes		740,938	

== State legislature ==
=== State Senate ===
17 of the 34 seats in the West Virginia State Senate will hold elections, including 15 Republican-held seats and two Democratic-held seats. Three incumbents chose not to seek re-election: Republican David Stover and both Democrats Mike Caputo and Robert Plymale.

Of the 17 seats up for election, 16 were won by Republican candidates. This left only two democrats serving in the 34-member State Senate.

=== House of Delegates ===
All 100 seats in the West Virginia House of Delegates are up for election. Sixteen incumbents chose not to seek re-election including three Democrats and thirteen Republicans.

91 seats were won by Republican candidates, increasing their majority from 89 seats.

== Attorney General ==
Incumbent Patrick Morrisey did not seek a 4th term in office, instead running for governor. Incumbent State Auditor JB McCuskey won the election.

West Virginia Attorney General election, 2024
Party	Candidate	Votes	%
Republican	JB McCuskey	501,452	70.02%
Democratic	Teresa Toriseva	214,654	29.98%
Total votes		716,106	

== Secretary of State ==
Incumbent Mac Warner did not seek re-election, instead running for governor. Mac's brother and former chair of the West Virginia Republican Party Kris Warner won the election.

West Virginia Secretary of State election, 2024
Party	Candidate	Votes	%
Republican	Kris Warner	510,992	71.15%
Democratic	Thornton Cooper	207,238	28.85%
Total votes		718,230	

== Treasurer ==
Incumbent Riley Moore did not seek re-election, instead running for the second district in the United States House. Larry Pack, the incumbent acting West Virginia Secretary of Revenue, ran unopposed in the general election.

=== Results ===
West Virginia State Treasurer election, 2024
Party	Candidate	Votes	%
Republican	Larry Pack	602,718	99.93%
Write-in		444	0.07%
Total votes		603,162	100.00%
Republican hold			

== Auditor ==
Incumbent JB McCuskey did not seek re-election, instead running for Attorney General. Republican state senator Mark Hunt won the election.

West Virginia State Auditor election, 2024
Party	Candidate	Votes	%
Republican	Mark Hunt	488,737	68.72%
Democratic	Mary Ann Claytor	222,491	31.28%
Total votes		711,228	

== Commissioner of Agriculture ==
The incumbent is Kent Leonhardt, who was first elected in 2016. He won re-election.

=== General election ===
General election results
Party	Candidate	Votes	%
Republican	Kent Leonhardt (incumbent)	490,964	69.14%
Democratic	Deborah Stiles	219,131	30.86%
Total votes		710,095	

== Judiciary ==
=== Supreme Court of Appeals ===
==== Division 1 ====
Justice C. Haley Bunn is the incumbent and was appointed to the seat by Governor Jim Justice in 2022 following the resignation of Evan Jenkins. Bunn ran unopposed in the race and thus won reelection.

May 14, 2024 West Virginia Supreme Court of Appeals election - Division 1
Party	Candidate	Votes	%
Nonpartisan	C. Haley Bunn (incumbent)	246,109	100.00%
Total votes		246,109	100.00%

Division 1 Results by county Bunn: 90–100%

==== Division 2 ====
The incumbent is Justice John A. Hutchison, who was elected to a full term in 2020. Hutchison is not running for reelection. Charles S. Trump IV, a member of West Virginia State Senate and the former minority leader of the West Virginia House of Delegates, announced his candidacy in 2023. Trump ran unopposed in the race and thus won the election.

May 14, 2024 West Virginia Supreme Court of Appeals election - Division 2
Party	Candidate	Votes	%
Nonpartisan	Charles S. Trump	230,877	100.00%
Total votes		230,877	100.00%

Division 2 Results by county Trump: 90–100%

=== Intermediate Court of Appeals ===
The 2024 election is the first election for the Intermediate Court of Appeals following its creation in 2022.

The incumbent is Thomas E. Scarr of Huntington, who was appointed to the court by Governor Jim Justice for a two and one half year term. Scarr elected to not run for reelection.

==== Candidates ====
- Mychal Schulz, attorney
- Elgine McArdle, attorney and former chairwoman of the West Virginia Republican Party
- Ryan White, attorney and lobbyist

West Virginia Intermediate Court of Appeals election, 2024
Party	Candidate	Votes	%
Nonpartisan	Ryan White	160,732	59.1%
Nonpartisan	Elgine McArdle	58,775	21.6%
Nonpartisan	Michael Schulz	52,238	19.2%
Total votes		271,745	100%

== Ballot measures ==
In 2024, one amendment appeared on the ballot.

=== Amendment 1 ===
Amendment 1
- November 5, 2024
- Prohibit "Medically-Assisted Suicide, Euthanasia, and Mercy Killing" Measure
Yes
60–70%
50–60%
No
60–70%
50–60%

The Prohibit "Medically-Assisted Suicide, Euthanasia, and Mercy Killing" Measure was a legislatively-referred ballot measure which proposed to amend the state Constitution to prohibit medically-assisted suicide from being practiced in the state. The ballot measure was narrowly accepted by voters. The practice was already illegal in the state by the West Virginia Health Care Decisions Act.

Amendment 1
Choice	Votes	%
For	340,403	50.44
Against	334,521	49.56
Total	674,924	100.00

== Maps ==
Maps of the 2024 West Virginia general election

Change in turnout from 2020 (percentage)
Higher turnout: +0–2% +2–4% +4–6% +6–8% +8–10% >10%
Lower turnout: −0–2% −2–4% −4–6%

Change in turnout from 2020 (vote totals)
Each dot denotes a net change of 200 votes in either direction, rounded.
More votes Fewer votes
