= 2016 West Virginia Secretary of State election =

- November 8, 2016
- Turnout: 57.4%
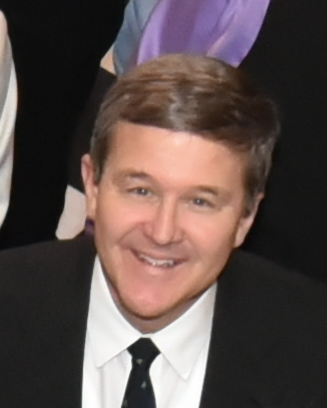

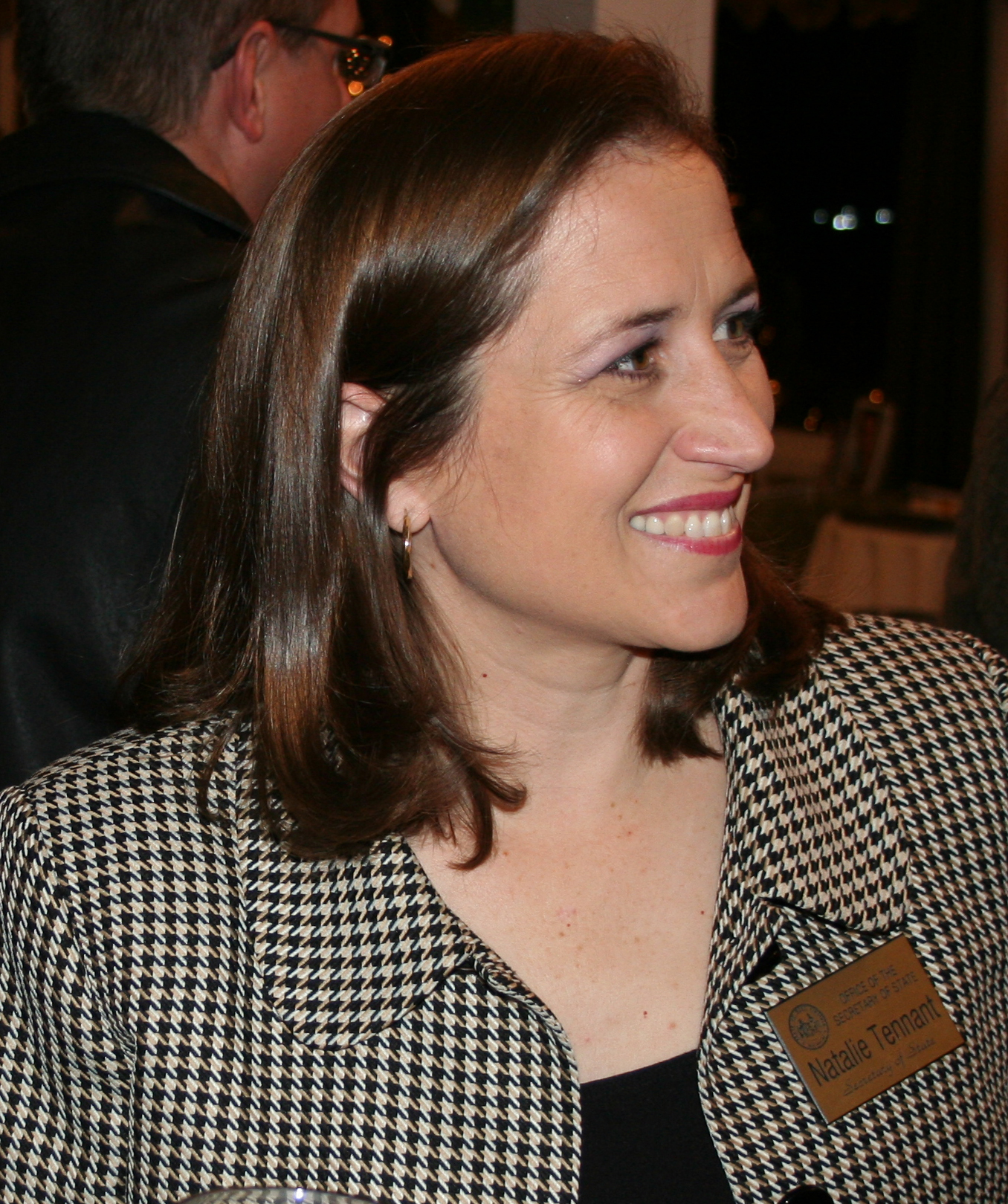
Nominee	Mac Warner	Natalie Tennant
Party	Republican	Democratic
Popular vote	335,526	323,750
Percentage	48.53%	46.82%
- County results Warner: 40–50% 50–60% 60–70% 70–80% Tennant: 40–50% 50–60%
Secretary of State before election
Natalie Tennant
Democratic
Elected Secretary of State
Mac Warner
Republican

The 2016 West Virginia Secretary of State election was held on November 8, 2016, to elect the West Virginia Secretary of State, concurrently with the 2016 U.S. presidential election, as well as elections for the U.S. House of Representatives, governor, and other state and local elections. Primary elections were held on May 10, 2016.

Incumbent Democratic secretary of state Natalie Tennant ran for re-election to a third term in office, but lost to Republican attorney and veteran Mac Warner. In 2020, a rematch between the two candidates occurred, with Warner expanding his margin of victory significantly.

== Democratic primary ==
=== Candidates ===
==== Nominee ====
- Natalie Tennant, incumbent secretary of state (2009–present) and nominee for United States Senate in 2014

==== Eliminated in primary ====
- Patsy Trecost, state delegate from the 48th district (2014–present)

=== Results ===
Democratic primary results by county Tennant: 50–60%; 60–70%; 70–80%; 80–90%; Trecost: 50–60%

Democratic primary results
Party	Candidate	Votes	%
Democratic	Natalie Tennant (incumbent)	192,176	77.18
Democratic	Patsy Trecost	56,832	22.82
Total votes		249,008	100.0

== Republican primary ==
=== Candidates ===
==== Nominee ====
- Mac Warner, attorney and Army veteran

==== Eliminated in primary ====
- Barry Holstein, Army veteran

=== Results ===
Republican primary results by county Warner: 50–60%; 60–70%; 70–80%; 80–90%; Holstein: 50–60%; 60–70%; 70–80%

Republican primary results
Party	Candidate	Votes	%
Republican	Mac Warner	105,800	63.33
Republican	Barry Holstein	61,271	36.67
Total votes		167,071	100.0

== General election ==
=== Post-primary endorsements ===
Natalie Tennant (D)

Labor unions

- West Virginia AFL-CIO
- International Brotherhood of Boilermakers, Iron Ship Builders, Blacksmiths, Forgers and Helpers

Newspapers and other media

- The Exponent Telegram
- Charleston Gazette-Mail
- The Herald-Dispatch
Mac Warner (R)

Newspapers and other media

- The Parkersburg News and Sentinel
John Buckley (L)

Newspapers and other media

- The Dominion Post

=== Results ===
2016 West Virginia Secretary of State election
Party	Candidate	Votes	%
Republican	Mac Warner	335,526	48.53
Democratic	Natalie Tennant (incumbent)	323,750	46.82
Libertarian	John Buckley	32,179	4.65
Total votes		691,455	100.0
Republican gain from Democratic			

== See also ==
- Politics of West Virginia
