= 2024 West Virginia Secretary of State election =

- November 5, 2024
Nominee	Kris Warner	Thornton Cooper
Party	Republican	Democratic
Popular vote	510,992	207,238
Percentage	71.15%	28.85%
- Warner: 50–60% 60–70% 70–80% 80–90%
Secretary of State before election
Mac Warner
Republican
Elected Secretary of State
Kris Warner
Republican

The 2024 West Virginia Secretary of State election was held on November 5, 2024, to elect the next secretary of state of West Virginia, concurrently with the 2024 U.S. presidential election, as well as elections to the U.S. Senate and various state and local elections, including for U.S. House and governor of West Virginia. Incumbent Republican secretary of state Mac Warner was eligible to seek re-election to a third term but chose instead to run for governor. Republican nominee Kris Warner (brother to Mac Warner) won with more than 71% of votes.

== Republican primary ==
=== Candidates ===
==== Nominee ====
- Kris Warner, executive director of the West Virginia Economic Development Authority, former chair of the West Virginia Republican Party, and brother of incumbent Mac Warner

==== Eliminated in primary ====
- Ken Reed, former state delegate from the 59th district (2020–2022)
- Doug Skaff, former Democratic Minority Leader of the West Virginia House of Delegates (2020–2023) from the 57th district (2008–2014, 2018–2023)
- Brian Wood, Putnam County Clerk

==== Withdrawn ====
- Chris Pritt, state delegate (ran for state senate)

==== Declined ====
- Mac Warner, incumbent secretary of state (ran for governor)

=== Polling ===
Poll source	Date(s) administered	Sample size (Note: Key: A – all adults RV – registered voters LV – likely voters V – unclear)	Margin of error	Ken Reed	Doug Skaff	Kris Warner	Brian Wood	Other	Undecided
American Pulse Research & Polling (R) (Note: Poll commissioned by WMOV.)	November 13–14, 2023	414 (LV)	± 4.8%	4%	8%	20%	6%	4% (Note: Chris Pritt with 4%)	58%

==== Results ====
Results by county: Warner: 30–40%; 40–50%; 50–60%; 60–70%; Skaff: 40–50%; Reed: 40–50%; 60–70%; Wood: 70–80%

Republican primary results
Party	Candidate	Votes	%
Republican	Kris Warner	92,488	45.89%
Republican	Doug Skaff	42,291	20.98%
Republican	Ken Reed	33,891	16.81%
Republican	Brian Wood	32,892	16.32%
Total votes		201,562	100.00%

== Democratic primary ==
=== Candidates ===
==== Nominee ====
- Thornton Cooper, attorney

Democratic primary results
Party	Candidate	Votes	%
Democratic	Thornton Cooper	81,773	100.0%
Total votes		81,773	100.0%

== General election ==
=== Predictions ===
Source	Ranking	As of
Sabato's Crystal Ball	Safe R	July 25, 2024

=== Results ===
2024 West Virginia Secretary of State election
Party	Candidate	Votes	%	±%
Republican	Kris Warner	510,992	71.15%	+12.89%
Democratic	Thornton Cooper	207,238	28.85%	−12.89%
Total votes		718,230	100.00%	N/A
Republican hold				

==== By county ====
County	Kris Warner Republican		Thornton Cooper Democratic		Margin		Total
County	#	%	#	%	#	%	Total
Barbour	4,844	80.32%	1,187	19.68%	3,657	60.64%	6,031
Berkeley	36,897	68.72%	16,796	31.28%	20,101	37.44%	53,693
Boone	5,639	74.58%	1,922	25.42%	3,717	49.16%	7,561
Braxton	3,706	74.85%	1,245	25.15%	2,461	49.71%	4,951
Brooke	6,519	71.43%	2,608	28.57%	3,911	42.85%	9,127
Cabell	20,802	62.79%	12,325	37.21%	8,477	25.59%	33,127
Calhoun	2,054	78.19%	573	21.81%	1,481	56.38%	2,627
Clay	2,401	79.48%	620	20.52%	1,781	58.95%	3,021
Doddridge	2,420	86.89%	365	13.11%	2,055	73.79%	2,785
Fayette	10,388	70.64%	4,317	29.36%	6,071	41.29%	14,705
Gilmer	1,691	76.41%	522	23.59%	1,169	52.82%	2,213
Grant	4,489	89.40%	532	10.60%	3,957	78.81%	5,021
Greenbrier	10,260	71.96%	3,998	28.04%	6,262	43.92%	14,258
Hampshire	8,043	81.51%	1,824	18.49%	6,219	63.03%	9,867
Hancock	8,980	73.23%	3,283	26.77%	5,697	46.46%	12,263
Hardy	4,762	78.52%	1,303	21.48%	3,459	57.03%	6,065
Harrison	20,330	72.17%	7,841	27.83%	12,489	44.33%	28,171
Jackson	9,484	77.72%	2,718	22.28%	6,766	55.45%	12,202
Jefferson	16,599	59.29%	11,398	40.71%	5,201	18.58%	27,997
Kanawha	43,320	60.86%	27,859	39.14%	15,461	21.72%	71,179
Lewis	5,405	80.13%	1,340	19.87%	4,065	60.27%	6,745
Lincoln	5,223	78.04%	1,470	21.96%	3,753	56.07%	6,693
Logan	8,023	79.91%	2,017	20.09%	6,006	59.82%	10,040
Marion	15,607	66.19%	7,971	33.81%	7,636	32.39%	23,578
Marshall	9,273	73.79%	3,294	26.21%	5,979	47.58%	12,567
Mason	7,725	77.39%	2,257	22.61%	5,468	54.78%	9,982
McDowell	3,550	77.16%	1,051	22.84%	2,499	54.31%	4,601
Mercer	17,481	78.45%	4,802	21.55%	12,679	56.90%	22,283
Mineral	9,958	80.54%	2,406	19.46%	7,552	61.08%	12,364
Mingo	6,226	82.86%	1,288	17.14%	4,938	65.72%	7,514
Monongalia	21,324	53.63%	18,436	46.37%	2,888	7.26%	39,760
Monroe	4,841	79.77%	1,228	20.23%	3,613	59.53%	6,069
Morgan	6,658	77.98%	1,880	22.02%	4,778	55.96%	8,538
Nicholas	7,464	79.36%	1,941	20.64%	5,523	58.72%	9,405
Ohio	11,453	64.60%	6,276	35.40%	5,177	29.20%	17,729
Pendleton	2,495	79.06%	661	20.94%	1,834	58.11%	3,156
Pleasants	2,468	78.47%	677	21.53%	1,791	56.95%	3,145
Pocahontas	2,655	73.83%	941	26.17%	1,714	47.66%	3,596
Preston	10,694	78.86%	2,866	21.14%	7,828	57.73%	13,560
Putnam	19,432	74.47%	6,660	25.53%	12,772	48.95%	26,092
Raleigh	22,210	77.09%	6,602	22.91%	15,608	54.17%	28,812
Randolph	7,863	72.10%	3,042	27.90%	4,821	44.21%	10,905
Ritchie	3,225	86.00%	525	14.00%	2,700	72.00%	3,750
Roane	4,056	77.54%	1,175	22.46%	2,881	55.08%	5,231
Summers	3,691	74.97%	1,232	25.03%	2,459	49.95%	4,923
Taylor	5,356	76.69%	1,628	23.31%	3,728	53.38%	6,984
Tucker	2,413	70.80%	995	29.20%	1,418	41.61%	3,408
Tyler	2,857	83.46%	566	16.54%	2,291	66.93%	3,423
Upshur	7,376	79.03%	1,957	20.97%	5,419	58.06%	9,333
Wayne	10,612	74.80%	3,575	25.20%	7,037	49.60%	14,187
Webster	2,209	80.56%	533	19.44%	1,676	61.12%	2,742
Wetzel	4,295	75.06%	1,427	24.94%	2,868	50.12%	5,722
Wirt	1,930	81.02%	452	18.98%	1,478	62.05%	2,382
Wood	25,589	72.53%	9,692	27.47%	15,897	45.06%	35,281
Wyoming	5,727	83.41%	1,139	16.59%	4,588	66.82%	6,866
Totals	510,992	71.15%	207,238	28.85%	303,754	42.29%	718,230

Counties that flipped Democratic to Republican

- Kanawha (largest city: Charleston)
- Marion (largest city: Fairmont)
- Monongalia (largest city: Morgantown)

==== By congressional district ====
Warner won both congressional districts.

District	Warner	Cooper	Representative
1st	72%	28%	Carol Miller
2nd	70%	30%	Alex Mooney (118th Congress)
2nd	70%	30%	Riley Moore (119th Congress)

== Notes ==
Partisan clients
