= 2024 West Virginia gubernatorial election =

- November 5, 2024
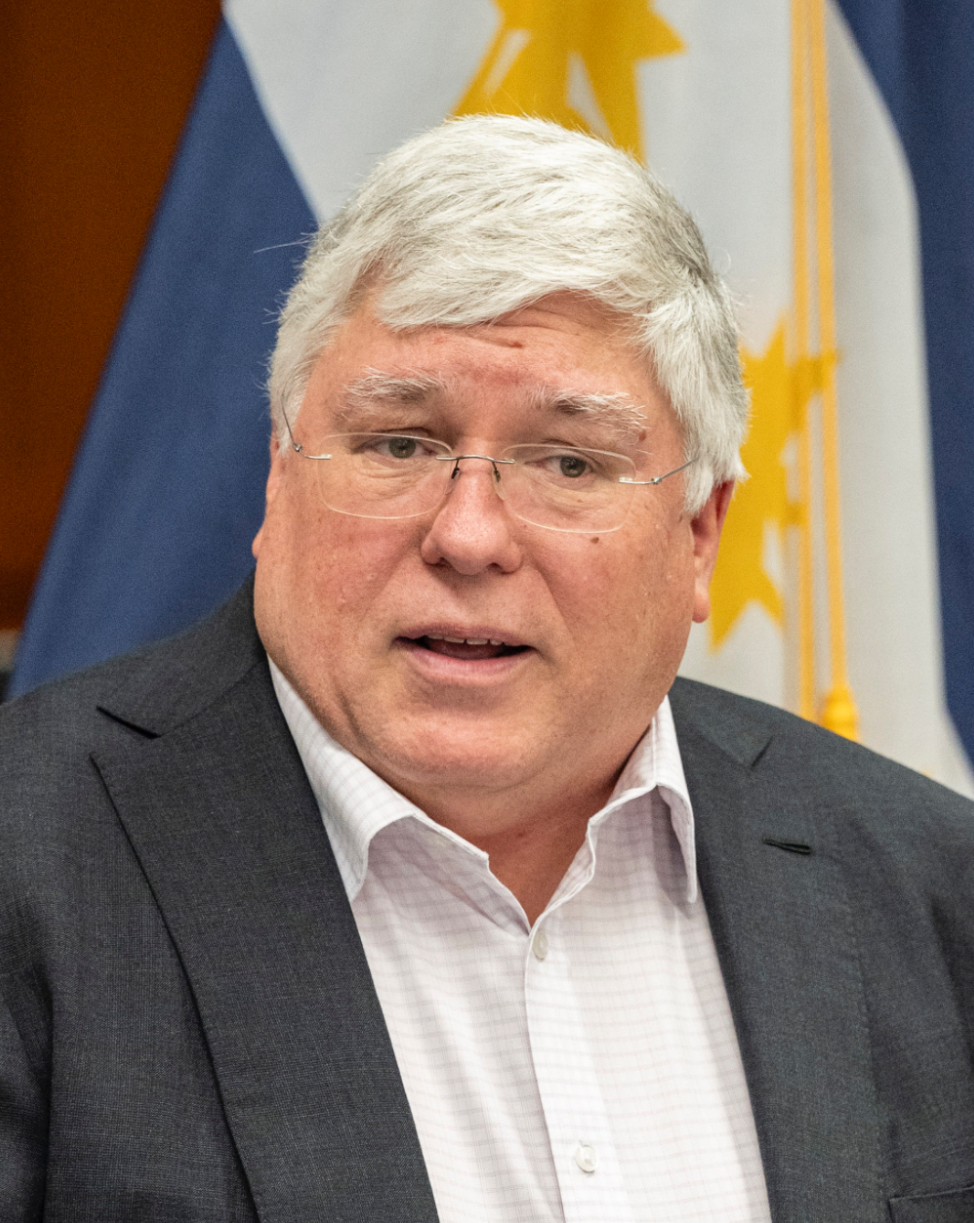

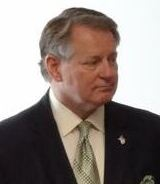
Nominee	Patrick Morrisey	Steve Williams
Party	Republican	Democratic
Popular vote	459,300	233,976
Percentage	61.99%	31.58%
- Morrisey: 40–50% 50–60% 60–70% 70–80% 80–90%
Governor before election
Jim Justice
Republican
Elected Governor
Patrick Morrisey
Republican

The 2024 West Virginia gubernatorial election was held on November 5, 2024, to elect the governor of West Virginia, concurrently with the 2024 U.S. presidential election, as well as elections to the United States Senate and elections to the United States House of Representatives, and various state and local elections. Republican state Attorney General Patrick Morrisey was elected to his first term in office after defeating Democratic Huntington mayor Steve Williams in the general election. Incumbent Republican Jim Justice was term-limited and was unable to seek re-election to a third consecutive term in office; he instead ran for the U.S. Senate.

First elected in 2016 as a Democrat by 6.8 percentage points, Justice switched parties in August 2017 and won re-election in 2020 as a Republican by 33.3 percentage points. Primary elections took place on May 14, 2024. This is the first time since 1972 that Republicans won consecutive gubernatorial elections in the state. However, Morrisey performed worse than Republican presidential candidate Donald Trump, who outperformed Morrisey by 7.98 percentage points. Meanwhile, Williams outperformed Kamala Harris by 3.48 percentage points. All statewide Democratic nominees failed to carry a single county in their respective general election races in 2024.

== Background ==
A conservative rural southeastern state, West Virginia is considered extremely Republican at the federal and state levels; Republicans hold all statewide executive offices and supermajorities in both state legislative houses, and from 2015 until he became an Independent in 2024, Senator Joe Manchin had been the state's only congressional Democrat. In the 2020 presidential election, Donald Trump carried West Virginia by 38.93 percentage points.

With Jim Justice term-limited and unable to run for a third consecutive term as Governor, the Republican primary was expected to be competitive and crowded. Most analysts considered Republicans to be a heavy favorite, given the state's partisan lean and the margin from the previous election.

== Republican primary ==
=== Candidates ===
==== Nominee ====
- Patrick Morrisey, West Virginia Attorney General (2013–2025) and nominee for U.S. Senate in 2018

==== Eliminated in primary ====
- Moore Capito, former state delegate (2016–2023), grandson of former governor Arch Moore, and son of U.S. Senator Shelley Moore Capito
- Kevin Christian, electrical engineer
- Chris Miller, automobile dealer and son of U.S. Representative Carol Miller
- Mitch Roberts, store manager and write-in candidate for governor in 2020
- Mac Warner, West Virginia Secretary of State (2017–2025)

==== Withdrew ====
- J.B. McCuskey, West Virginia State Auditor (2017–2025) (ran for attorney general)
- Rashida Yost, businesswoman

==== Declined ====
- Kent Leonhardt, West Virginia Commissioner of Agriculture (2017–present) (ran for re-election)
- Riley Moore, West Virginia State Treasurer (2021–2025) and grandson of former governor Arch Moore (ran for U.S. House)

=== Endorsements ===
Moore Capito

Federal politicians

- Shelley Moore Capito, U.S. senator from West Virginia (2015–present) (candidate's mother)

Statewide politicians

- Jim Justice, governor of West Virginia (2017–2025)

Newspapers

- The Exponent Telegram
Chris Miller

Individuals

- Bob Huggins, former basketball coach
Patrick Morrisey

Individuals

- David Bossie, president of Citizens United
- Vivek Ramaswamy, entrepreneur and former candidate for president in 2024

Organizations

- Americans for Prosperity
- Citizens United PVF
- Club for Growth
- National Association for Gun Rights PAC
- NRA Political Victory Fund
- West Virginia Coal Association
- West Virginia Sheriff's Association

=== Debates ===
2024 West Virginia gubernatorial election Republican primary debates
No.	Date	Host	Moderator	Link	Republican	Republican	Republican	Republican
P Participant A Absent N Non-invitee I Invitee W Withdrawn								
P Participant A Absent N Non-invitee I Invitee W Withdrawn					Morrisey	Capito	Miller	Warner
1	Dec. 8, 2023	MetroNews	Hoppy Kercheval	YouTube	A	P	P	P
2	Feb. 29, 2024		Hoppy Kercheval	YouTube	P	P	P	P
3	Apr. 30, 2024	WSAZ-3		WSAZ-3	P	P	P	P

=== Fundraising ===
Campaign finance reports as of April 28, 2024
Candidate	Raised	Spent	Cash on hand
Patrick Morrisey (R)	$3,624,343	$3,078,086	$695,276
Moore Capito (R)	$2,131,285	$1,519,377	$599,354
Chris Miller (R)	$1,615,788	$6,175,751	$519,538
Mac Warner (R)	$559,038	$372,948	$172,787
Source: West Virginia Secretary of State

=== Polling ===
Poll source	Date(s) administered	Sample size (Note: Key: A – all adults RV – registered voters LV – likely voters V – unclear)	Margin of error	Moore Capito	Chris Miller	Patrick Morrisey	Mac Warner	Other	Undecided
Emerson College	May 2–5, 2024	558 (LV)	± 4.1%	29%	21%	33%	15%	3% (Note: Mitch Roberts with 2%; Kevin Christian with 1%)	–
Research America (Note: Poll sponsored by West Virginia MetroNews and The Health Plan)	April 24 – May 1, 2024	407 (LV)	± 4.9%	24%	25%	32%	10%	3%	6%
NMB Research (Note: Poll sponsored by the Coalition for West Virginia’s Future, which supports Capito)	April 20–22, 2024	500 (LV)	± 4.4%	31%	14%	23%	13%	–	18%
Research America	April 3–9, 2024	400 (LV)	± 4.9%	29%	16%	31%	12%	3%	10%
WPA Intelligence (Note: Poll commissioned by Black Bear PAC, which supports Morrissey)	April 1–3, 2024	501 (LV)	± 4.4%	20%	19%	37%	14%	–	9%
Emerson College	March 19–21, 2024	735 (LV)	± 3.6%	14%	16%	33%	6%	–	29%
WPA Intelligence	November 27–29, 2023	507 (LV)	± 4.4%	23%	10%	39%	14%	–	14%
American Pulse Research & Polling (R) (Note: Poll sponsored by WMOV)	November 13–14, 2023	414 (LV)	± 4.8%	23%	10%	31%	14%	–	23%
CAMP (Note: Poll sponsored by American Freedom Builders, which supports Warner)	November 10–12, 2023	863 (LV)	± 3.26%	18%	11%	24%	21%	5%	21%
i360 (Note: Poll sponsored by Americans for Prosperity Action West Virginia, which supports Morrisey)	October 3–4, 2023	811 (LV)	± 3.4%	18%	6%	29%	8%	20% (Note: "Other" with 18%; Rashida Yost and "Refused" with 1%)	19%
West Virginia MetroNews	August 16–26, 2023	402 (RV)	± 4.9%	32%	9%	27%	6%	–	26%
Orion Strategies (Note: Poll sponsored by the West Virginia Chamber of Commerce)	June 17–20, 2023	651 (LV)	± 6.0%	30%	5%	31%	9%	8% (Note: J.B. McCuskey with 3%; "Another candidate" with 5%)	17%
National Research Inc.	February 23–28, 2023	600 (LV)	± 4.0%	15%	6%	28%	11%	6% (Note: J.B. McCuskey and Jeff Mullins with 3%)	29%

=== Results ===
Results by county: Morrisey: 20–30%; 30–40%; 40–50%; 50–60%; 60–70%; Capito: 20–30%; 30–40%; Miller: 20–30%; 30–40%; 40–50%

Republican primary results
Party	Candidate	Votes	%
Republican	Patrick Morrisey	75,111	33.28%
Republican	Moore Capito	62,181	27.55%
Republican	Chris Miller	46,010	20.39%
Republican	Mac Warner	36,170	16.03%
Republican	Mitch Roberts	3,138	1.39%
Republican	Kevin Christian	3,088	1.37%
Total votes		225,698	100.00%

== Democratic primary ==
=== Candidates ===
==== Nominee ====
- Steve Williams, mayor of Huntington (2013–2025) and former state delegate (1986–1994)

==== Declined ====
- Joe Manchin, U.S. senator (2010–2025) and former governor (2005–2010)
- Ben Salango, Kanawha County commissioner and nominee for governor in 2020

=== Results ===
Democratic primary results
Party	Candidate	Votes	%
Democratic	Steve Williams	89,545	100.00%
Total votes		89,545	100.00%

== Other candidates ==
=== Mountain Party ===
==== Nominee ====
- Chase Linko-Looper, U.S. Army veteran

=== Libertarian Party ===
==== Nominee ====
- Erika Kolenich, attorney and nominee for governor in 2020

=== Constitution Party ===
==== Nominee ====
- S. Marshall Wilson, former Republican state delegate (2016–2020) and write-in candidate for governor in 2020

=== Independents ===
==== Declined ====
- Joe Manchin, U.S. senator (2010–2025) and former governor (2005–2010) (endorsed Williams)

== General election ==
=== Predictions ===
Source	Ranking	As of
The Cook Political Report	Solid R	June 13, 2024
Inside Elections	Solid R	July 14, 2023
Sabato's Crystal Ball	Safe R	June 4, 2024
RCP	Solid R	July 13, 2024
Elections Daily	Safe R	July 12, 2023
CNalysis	Solid R	August 17, 2024

=== Post-primary endorsements ===
Patrick Morrisey (R)

Federal officials

- Donald Trump, 45th president of the United States (2017–2021)
Steve Williams (D)

Federal officials

- Joe Manchin, U.S. Senator (2010–2025) and former governor (2005–2010)

=== Debates ===
2024 West Virginia gubernatorial election debate
No.	Date	Host	Moderator	Link	Republican	Democratic
Key: P Participant A Absent N Not invited I Invited W Withdrawn						
Key: P Participant A Absent N Not invited I Invited W Withdrawn					Morrisey	Williams
1	Oct. 29, 2024	MetroNews	Hoppy Kercheval	C-SPAN	P	P

=== Fundraising ===
Campaign finance reports as of October 25, 2024
Candidate	Raised	Spent	Cash on hand
Patrick Morrisey (R)	$6,824,464	$6,183,264	$1,351,895
Steve Williams (D)	$250,255	$92,274	$156,426
Source: West Virginia Secretary of State

=== Polling ===
Poll source	Date(s) administered	Sample size	Margin of error	Patrick Morrisey (R)	Steve Williams (D)	Undecided
Research America (Note: Poll sponsored by West Virginia MetroNews)	August 21–27, 2024	400 (RV)	± 4.9%	49%	35%	16% (Note: "Someone else" with 5%)

Hypothetical polling

Patrick Morrisey vs. Joe Manchin vs. Steve Williams

Poll source	Date(s) administered	Sample size	Margin of error	Patrick Morrisey (R)	Joe Manchin (I)	Steve Williams (D)	Other	Undecided
Kaplan Strategies	June 4, 2024	464 (LV)	± 4.6%	34%	26%	21%	1%	18%

=== Results ===
2024 West Virginia gubernatorial election
Party	Candidate	Votes	%	±%
Republican	Patrick Morrisey	459,300	61.99%	▼1.50%
Democratic	Steve Williams	233,976	31.58%	▲1.36%
Libertarian	Erika Kolenich	21,228	2.87%	Steady
Constitution	S. Marshall Wilson	16,828	2.27%	N/A
Mountain	Chase Linko-Looper	9,596	1.30%	▼0.14%
Write-in		10	0.00%	▼0.05%
Total votes		740,938	100.00%	N/A
Republican hold				

==== By county ====
Morrisey won every county in the state.

County	Patrick Morrisey Republican		Steve Williams Democratic		Various candidates Other parties		Margin		Total
County	#	%	#	%	#	%	#	%	Total
Barbour	4,521	72.52%	1,298	20.82%	415	6.66%	3,223	51.70%	6,234
Berkeley	33,619	61.08%	15,120	27.47%	6,302	11.45%	18,499	33.61%	55,041
Boone	4,874	62.16%	2,509	32.00%	458	5.84%	2,365	30.16%	7,841
Braxton	3,329	64.52%	1,535	29.75%	296	5.74%	1,794	34.77%	5,160
Brooke	6,250	66.28%	2,615	27.73%	564	5.98%	3,635	38.55%	9,429
Cabell	17,316	49.90%	15,432	44.47%	1,953	5.63%	1,884	5.43%	34,701
Calhoun	2,008	72.39%	607	21.88%	159	5.73%	1,401	50.50%	2,774
Clay	2,065	65.87%	857	27.34%	213	6.79%	1,208	38.53%	3,135
Doddridge	2,186	76.46%	506	17.70%	167	5.84%	1,680	58.76%	2,859
Fayette	9,093	60.34%	5,006	33.22%	970	6.44%	4,087	27.12%	15,069
Gilmer	1,522	67.14%	594	26.20%	151	6.66%	928	40.94%	2,267
Grant	4,535	85.24%	583	10.96%	202	3.80%	3,952	74.29%	5,320
Greenbrier	9,046	61.68%	4,944	33.71%	675	4.60%	4,102	27.97%	14,665
Hampshire	7,755	76.33%	1,794	17.66%	611	6.01%	5,961	58.67%	10,160
Hancock	8,590	68.13%	3,335	26.45%	684	5.42%	5,255	41.68%	12,609
Hardy	4,497	71.93%	1,364	21.82%	391	6.25%	3,133	50.11%	6,252
Harrison	17,953	62.35%	8,771	30.46%	2,072	7.20%	9,182	31.89%	28,796
Jackson	7,886	63.00%	3,499	27.95%	1,133	9.05%	4,387	35.05%	12,518
Jefferson	16,716	58.23%	10,705	37.29%	1,287	4.48%	6,011	20.94%	28,708
Kanawha	34,907	47.60%	33,906	46.24%	4,519	6.16%	1,001	1.37%	73,332
Lewis	4,873	70.06%	1,501	21.58%	581	8.35%	3,372	48.48%	6,955
Lincoln	4,505	65.15%	1,942	28.08%	468	6.77%	2,563	37.06%	6,915
Logan	7,424	69.12%	2,865	26.67%	452	4.21%	4,559	42.44%	10,741
Marion	13,883	57.57%	8,380	34.75%	1,853	7.68%	5,503	22.82%	24,116
Marshall	8,522	65.80%	3,605	27.83%	825	6.37%	4,917	37.96%	12,952
Mason	6,455	62.92%	3,239	31.57%	565	5.51%	3,216	31.35%	10,259
McDowell	3,489	69.95%	1,189	23.84%	310	6.21%	2,300	46.11%	4,988
Mercer	16,234	70.85%	5,560	24.27%	1,118	4.88%	10,674	46.59%	22,912
Mineral	9,771	77.21%	2,306	18.22%	578	4.57%	7,465	58.99%	12,655
Mingo	5,873	73.81%	1,781	22.38%	303	3.81%	4,092	51.43%	7,957
Monongalia	19,233	47.45%	18,949	46.75%	2,348	5.79%	284	0.70%	40,530
Monroe	4,454	72.05%	1,470	23.78%	258	4.17%	2,984	48.27%	6,182
Morgan	6,373	72.30%	1,747	19.82%	695	7.88%	4,626	52.48%	8,815
Nicholas	6,699	68.74%	2,552	26.19%	495	5.08%	4,147	42.55%	9,746
Ohio	10,634	58.29%	6,646	36.43%	962	5.27%	3,988	21.86%	18,242
Pendleton	2,486	75.29%	661	20.02%	155	4.69%	1,825	55.27%	3,302
Pleasants	2,358	73.03%	675	20.90%	196	6.07%	1,683	52.12%	3,229
Pocahontas	2,465	65.70%	1,057	28.17%	230	6.13%	1,408	37.53%	3,752
Preston	9,874	70.72%	3,055	21.88%	1,033	7.40%	6,819	48.84%	13,962
Putnam	16,068	59.96%	9,220	34.41%	1,508	5.63%	6,848	25.56%	26,796
Raleigh	20,000	67.11%	8,125	27.26%	1,678	5.63%	11,875	39.84%	29,803
Randolph	7,142	63.24%	3,376	29.89%	776	6.87%	3,766	33.35%	11,294
Ritchie	2,999	77.37%	642	16.56%	235	6.06%	2,357	60.81%	3,876
Roane	3,526	65.72%	1,535	28.61%	304	5.67%	1,991	37.11%	5,365
Summers	3,367	66.38%	1,474	29.06%	231	4.55%	1,893	37.32%	5,072
Taylor	4,829	67.92%	1,802	25.34%	479	6.74%	3,027	42.57%	7,110
Tucker	2,281	64.29%	1,040	29.31%	227	6.40%	1,241	34.98%	3,548
Tyler	2,596	73.96%	624	17.78%	290	8.26%	1,972	56.18%	3,510
Upshur	6,478	67.21%	1,948	20.21%	1,213	12.58%	4,530	47.00%	9,639
Wayne	9,471	62.32%	5,030	33.10%	697	4.59%	4,441	29.22%	15,198
Webster	2,038	70.84%	680	23.64%	159	5.53%	1,358	47.20%	2,877
Wetzel	4,007	67.49%	1,560	26.28%	370	6.23%	2,447	41.22%	5,937
Wirt	1,788	72.45%	523	21.19%	157	6.36%	1,265	51.26%	2,468
Wood	23,422	64.72%	10,532	29.10%	2,237	6.18%	12,890	35.62%	36,191
Wyoming	5,015	70.00%	1,705	23.80%	444	6.20%	3,310	46.20%	7,164
Totals	459,300	61.99%	233,976	31.58%	47,652	6.43%	225,324	30.41%	740,928

==== By congressional district ====
Morrisey won both congressional districts.

District	Morrisey	Williams	Representative
1st	60%	34%	Carol Miller
2nd	63%	30%	Alex Mooney (118th Congress)
2nd	63%	30%	Riley Moore (119th Congress)

== Notes ==
Partisan clients
