= Patrick Morrisey =

Governor of West Virginia since 2025

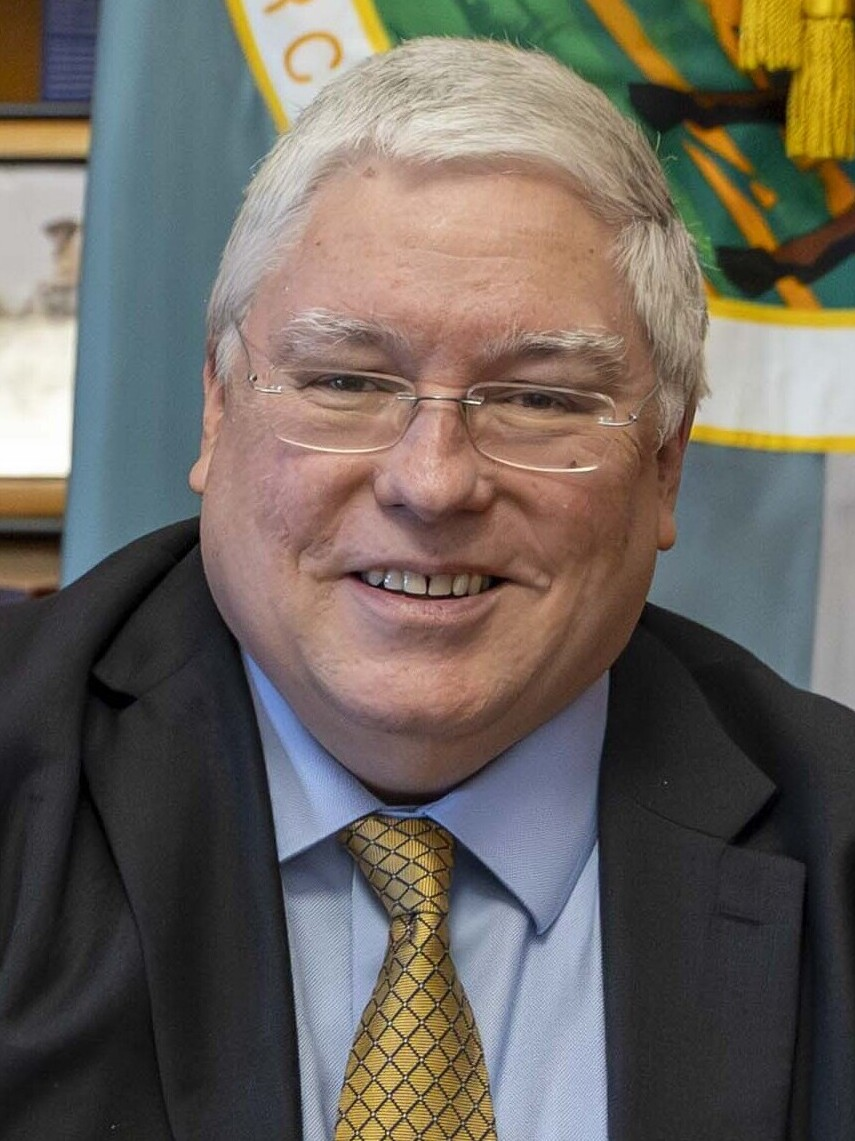
- Morrisey in 2026

37th Governor of West Virginia
- Incumbent
- Assumed office January 13, 2025
- Lieutenant: Randy Smith
- Preceded by: Jim Justice

34th Attorney General of West Virginia
- In office January 14, 2013 – January 13, 2025
- Governor: Earl Ray Tomblin; Jim Justice
- Preceded by: Darrell McGraw
- Succeeded by: JB McCuskey

Personal details
- Born: Patrick James Morrisey; December 21, 1967 (age 58) New York City, New York, U.S.
- Party: Republican
- Spouse: Denise Henry (m. 2008)
- Children: 1
- Education: Rutgers University, New Brunswick (BA); Rutgers University, Newark (JD)
- Profession: Politician; lawyer
- Website: Office website Campaign website
- Morrisey's voice Morrisey on the first presidency of Donald Trump; Recorded April 5, 2018

Patrick James Morrisey (born December 21, 1967) is an American politician and attorney serving since 2025 as the 37th governor of West Virginia. A member of the Republican Party, he served from 2013 to 2025 as the 34th attorney general of West Virginia.

Raised in Edison, New Jersey, Morrisey earned bachelor's and law degrees from Rutgers University. After working as an attorney and lobbyist in New Jersey and Washington, D.C., he was elected West Virginia attorney general in 2012, becoming the first Republican to hold the office since 1933. Morrisey was the Republican nominee in the 2018 United States Senate election in West Virginia, narrowly losing to incumbent Senator Joe Manchin. He was elected governor in 2024, defeating Democratic nominee Stephen T. Williams.

== Early life and education ==
Born in the New York City borough of Brooklyn, Morrisey grew up in Edison, New Jersey. His father was an account manager at U.S. Steel, while his mother worked as a registered nurse. Morrisey ran cross-country and played on his high school's tennis team, before he graduated from the St. Thomas Aquinas High School / Bishop George Ahr High School in 1985.

In 1989, Morrisey graduated with honors from Rutgers University with a Bachelor of Arts in history and political science. He also graduated from Rutgers School of Law–Newark, receiving his juris doctor in 1992.

== Law practice and lobbying career ==
Morrisey was active in Republican politics in New Jersey early in life; he worked on George H. W. Bush's presidential campaign in 1988 and Cary Edwards' gubernatorial campaign in 1989, and was press secretary of Christine Todd Whitman's U.S. Senate campaign in 1990.

After graduating from Rutgers, Morrisey lived in Westfield, New Jersey, and opened a private law firm in 1992. From 1995 to 1999, he practiced health care, election, regulatory and communications law at Arent Fox, a national white shoe law and lobbying firm.

From 1999 to 2004, Morrisey served as deputy staff director and chief health counsel for the United States House Committee on Energy and Commerce, where he worked on the passage of the Public Health Security and Bioterrorism Preparedness Response Act and the Medicare Prescription Drug, Improvement, and Modernization Act (establishing Medicare Part D). In 2000, he ran for the United States House of Representatives in New Jersey's 7th congressional district, receiving 9% of the vote in the Republican primary. Morrisey opposed abortion with exceptions and faced fierce opposition from anti-abortion leaders and groups in the district.

From 2004 to 2012, Morrisey worked as a lawyer in Washington, D.C. He moved to Jefferson County, West Virginia, in 2006. He was a partner at the corporate law firm Sidley Austin before joining King & Spalding, where he became a partner.

As a lobbyist, Morrisey was viewed as an expert on health and drug-related regulations and legislation. He was paid $250,000 to lobby on behalf of a pharmaceutical trade group funded by some of the same opioid distributors West Virginia sued for flooding the state with opioids.

== Attorney General of West Virginia (2013–2025) ==
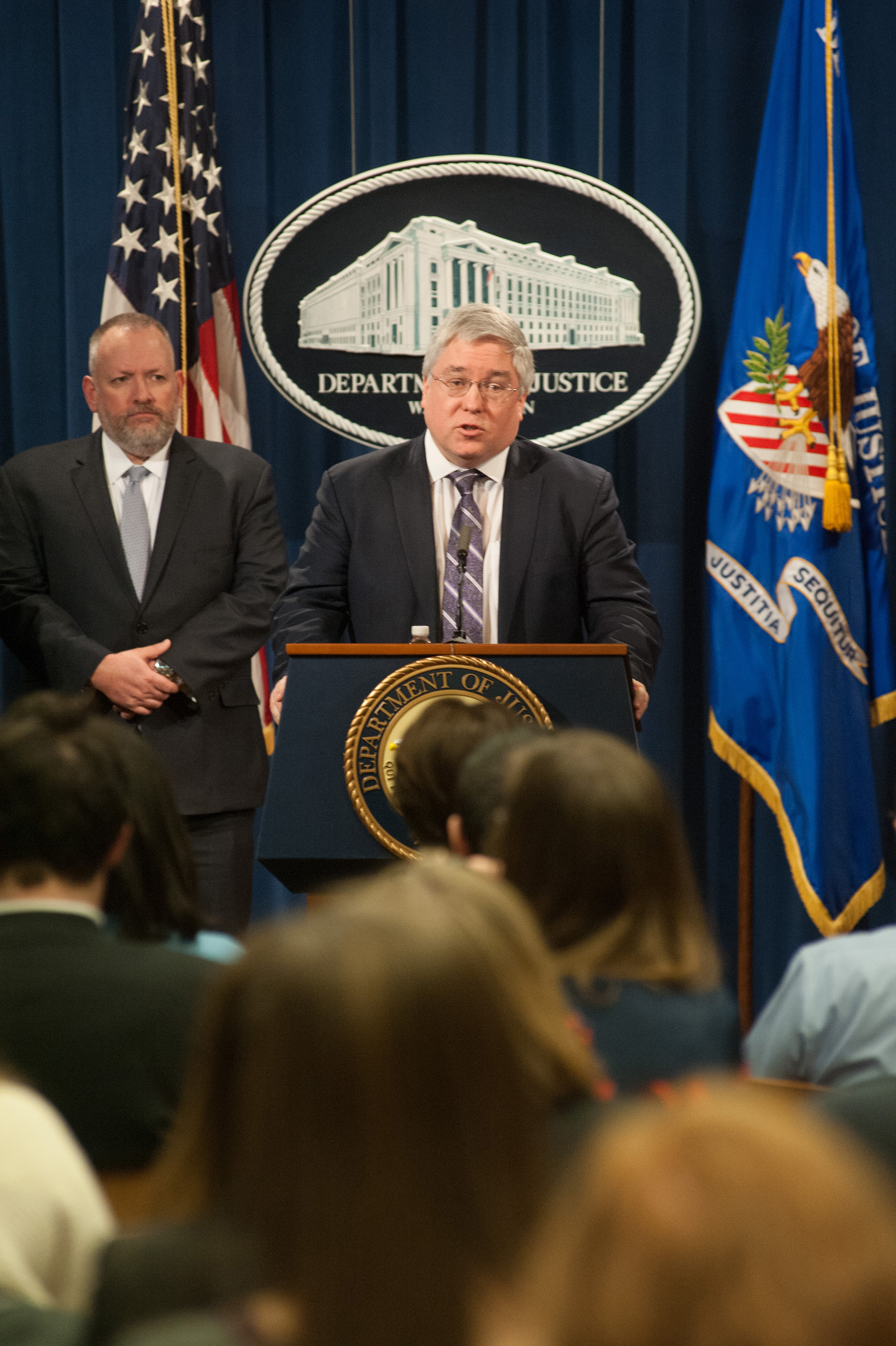
Morrissey speaking to the United States Department of Justice in 2018

In 2012, Morrisey ran for Attorney General of West Virginia against Darrell McGraw, a five-term incumbent. He defeated McGraw and was sworn in on January 14, 2013, making him West Virginia's first Republican state attorney general since 1933.

=== Federal lawsuits ===
==== DEA opioid lawsuit ====
Morrisey sued the Drug Enforcement Administration (DEA) to release its data on opioid sales and the sales quota system it uses to regulate opioid manufacturers, the first such lawsuit in West Virginia history. He placed a hold on the lawsuit after successfully negotiating with the Trump administration to have the DEA reconsider whether to amend the aggregate quota system.

American Farm Bureau v. EPA. On September 13, 2013, in American Farm Bureau Federation v. EPA, the United States District Court for the Middle District of Pennsylvania held that the EPA had the authority under the Clean Water Act to impose a total maximum daily load standard for pollutants and that the established procedures were consistent with the Administrative Procedure Act. This is contrary to the argument by Morrisey's amicus brief, which said that the "EPA's overreach in the Chesapeake Bay Total Maximum Daily Load (TDML) infringes states' traditional rights the Clean Water Act intended to protect."

Mingo Logan Coal v. EPA. On March 24, 2014, in Mingo Logan Coal Company v. EPA, the Supreme Court of the United States denied the petition for writ of certiorari. The Court rejected the argument in Morrisey's brief that the "EPA unlawfully vetoed permits issued by the United States Army Corps of Engineers."

White Stallion v. EPA. On April 15, 2014, in White Stallion Energy Center v. EPA, the United States Court of Appeals for the District of Columbia Circuit held that the EPA's Mercury and Air Toxics Standard (MATS) rule regulation of emissions from coal-fired electric generating units was appropriate and necessary and that the EPA acted within its legal authority and demonstrated a reasonable connection between its action and the record of decision. The Court rejected the argument in Morrisey's brief that the "EPA rule usurped the states' authority by setting minimum substantive requirements for state performance standards."

Homer City v. EPA. On April 29, 2014, in EPA v. EME Homer City Generation, the U.S. Supreme Court held the EPA's Cross-State Air Pollution Rule was a cost-effective allocation of emission reductions among upwind States and is a permissible, workable, and equitable interpretation of the Good Neighbor Provision. The Court rejected the argument in Morrisey's brief that the "EPA exceeded its authority under the federal Clean Air Act when it promulgated the Cross-State Air Pollution Rule".

Utility Air v. EPA. On June 23, 2014, in Utility Air Regulatory Group v. EPA, the U.S. Supreme Court held that the EPA reasonably interpreted the Act to require sources that would need permits based on their emission of conventional pollutants to comply with Best Available Control Technology (BACT) for greenhouse gases and that EPA's decision to require BACT for greenhouse gases emitted by sources otherwise subject to Prevention of Significant Deterioration (PSD) review is, as a general matter, a permissible interpretation of the statute. The Court rejected the argument in Morrisey's brief that the "EPA violated the U.S. Constitution and the Clean Air Act by concocting greenhouse gas regulations" and that the court must "rein in a usurpatious agency and remind the President and his subordinates that they cannot rule by executive decree."

Murray Energy v. EPA. On June 25, 2014, Morrisey and other attorneys general submitted an amicus brief in Murray Energy v. EPA before the U.S. Court of Appeals, D.C. Circuit. This lawsuit was prematurely filed before EPA had issued the final standards, which were not due until June 1, 2015. The D.C. Circuit had ruled on this issue in December 2012 in Las Brisas Energy Center v. EPA. The court dismissed the case with a single short sentence: "The challenged proposed rule is not final agency action subject to judicial review."

National Mining v. EPA. On July 11, 2014, in National Mining Association vs EPA, the United States Court of Appeals for the District of Columbia Circuit held that the EPA and the U.S. Corps of Engineers had the statutory authority under the Clean Water Act to enact a procedure rule (Enhanced Coordination Process memorandum) to review mountaintop mining permits. The Court rejected the argument in Morrisey's brief that the "EPA was attempting to take for itself responsibilities reserved to the states and other federal agencies."

West Virginia et al. v. EPA. On July 31, 2014, Morrisey and attorneys general from other states filed a lawsuit, West Virginia et al. v. EPA, in the United States Court of Appeals for the District of Columbia Circuit challenging a court-ordered settlement on March 2, 2011, between the EPA and 11 states—New York, California, Connecticut, Delaware, Maine, New Mexico, Oregon, Rhode Island, Vermont, Washington, Massachusetts—and the District of Columbia. In the settlement, EPA promised to issue its now-pending rule establishing standards of performance for greenhouse gas (GHG) emissions from Electric Utility Steam Generating Units (EGUs). A settlement was reached based on guidance from the 2007 U.S. Supreme Court ruling Massachusetts v. Environmental Protection Agency, which held that carbon dioxide is an air pollutant subject to regulation under the Clean Air Act. The attorneys general's lawsuit was over three years late. The EPA published the proposed settlement in December 2010, and Section 113(g) of the Clean Air Act allows a 30-day period to challenge any requirements of the Clean Air Act.

In Morrisey's lawsuit against the EPA he said that the Clean Air Act "precludes EPA from directing States to establish standards of performance for any existing source for any air pollutant." The U.S. Court of Appeals for the District of Columbia Court disagreed, and on June 9, 2015, said it "denied the petition for review and the petition for a writ of prohibition because the proposed rule of concern is not final. The Court only claims authority to review the legality of final agency rules, not proposals."

==== Environmental Protection Agency ====
Morrisey's office filed several lawsuits and amicus briefs challenging the United States Environmental Protection Agency (EPA).

In August 2014, Morrisey filed a lawsuit, along with 11 other states, challenging the EPA's proposal to regulate coal-fired power plants as part of then President Barack Obama's plan to mitigate climate change. This suit resulted in a historic 2016 stay in the Supreme Court.

==== Patient Protection and Affordable Care Act ====
In 2014, Morrisey sued the federal government, challenging regulatory changes described by the Obama administration as an administrative fix to the implementation of the Patient Protection and Affordable Care Act (ACA). The suit, State of West Virginia v. U.S. Department of Health and Human Services, was dismissed by the United States District Court for the District of Columbia in 2015. Morrisey appealed to the U.S. Court of Appeals for the District of Columbia, which in 2016 also rejected the suit, finding that West Virginia has suffered no injury-in-fact and thus lacked standing.

===== Clean Power Plan litigation =====
West Virginia et al. v. EPA (challenged draft Clean Power Plan rule). On August 1, 2014, West Virginia and 12 states filed suit to block the draft Clean Power Plan rule. On June 9, 2015, the U.S. Court of Appeals for the District of Columbia Circuit rejected Morrisey's challenge to the rule, which he filed on September 3, 2014, as premature, because the rule was a draft rule, not a final rule, and had not yet been published in the Federal Register.

West Virginia et al. v. EPA (Motion for Expedition of challenge to Clean Power Plan). On October 21, 2014, the U.S. Court of Appeals for the District of Columbia Circuit denied Morrisey's Motion for Expedition of hearing on challenge to Clean Power Plan, which he filed on September 3, 2014. On June 2, 2014, the EPA had released the draft Clean Power Plan. On September 2, 2014, New York and 11 states had filed a petition in support of the Clean Power Plan.

West Virginia et al. v. EPA (request for emergency stay of final Clean Power Plan rule). On September 9, 2015, the U.S. Court of Appeals for the District of Columbia Circuit refused to grant Morrisey's request for an emergency stay in the Clean Power Plan. On August 5, 2015, West Virginia and 12 states had requested to halt implementation of the Clean Power Plan until the courts ruled. On August 13, 2015, West Virginia and other 12 states had filed a petition for an emergency stay.

West Virginia et al. v. EPA (request to deny implementation of Clean Power Plan). On January 21, 2016, the U.S. Court of Appeals for the District of Columbia Circuit denied Morrisey's request to halt implementation of the Clean Power Plan until litigation concluded. On October 23, 2015, the EPA had published the Clean Power Plan in the Federal Register.

West Virginia et al. v. EPA (request to stay Clean Power Plan). January 26, 2016. West Virginia and 24 states filed suit to stay the Clean Power Plan before the U.S. Supreme Court.

==== Second Amendment ====
Morrisey has filed several amicus briefs in lawsuits challenging Second Amendment decisions.

Kachalsky v. Cacace. On April 15, 2013, the U.S. Supreme Court refused to hear an appeal in Kachalsky v. Cacace, which challenged a New York law that requires a person to show a particular need to obtain a permit to carry a firearm outside the home. Morrisey and other state attorneys general had submitted a brief challenging the lower court decision, saying that the law "does not survive any level of scrutiny".

Drake v. Jerejian. On May 5, 2014, the U.S. Supreme Court refused to hear an appeal in Drake v. Jerejian, which challenged New Jersey's requirement that concealed carry permit applicants must demonstrate a "justifiable need" to be issued a handgun carry permit. Morrisey and other state attorneys general submitted a brief challenging the lower court decision saying that New Jersey's law would "threaten" and "shake the foundation" of less restrictive gun-permitting schemes in other states.

Abramski v. United States. On June 16, 2014, the U.S. Supreme Court held in Abramski v. United States of America that "regardless whether the actual buyer could have purchased the gun, a person who buys a gun on someone else's behalf while falsely claiming that it is for himself makes a material misrepresentation punishable" under the law. This was contrary to Morrisey's claim that the "Department of Justice wants to ensnare innocent West Virginian gun owners in a web of criminal laws if they try to sell their guns" and that "the administration's interpretation oversteps the law and could make criminals out of innocent citizens."

New York State Rifle & Pistol Association v. Cuomo and Connecticut Citizens' Defense League v. Malloy. On October 19, 2015, the U.S. Court of Appeals for the Second Circuit held in New York State Rifle & Pistol Association v. Cuomo and Connecticut Citizens that "The core prohibitions by New York and Connecticut of assault weapons and large-capacity magazines do not violate the Second Amendment." This was contrary to Morrisey's and other state attorneys general's claim that "New York's outright prohibition of semi-automatic firearms burdens the fundamental right to keep and bear arms" and "New York's ban of semi-automatic firearms cannot survive strict scrutiny".

Friedman v. City of Highland Park. On December 7, 2015, the U.S. Supreme Court refused to hear an appeal of Friedman v. City of Highland Park. Morrisey and other attorneys general had filed an amicus brief saying that the ruling by the U.S. Court of Appeals for the Seventh Circuit was a "threat posed by narrow judicial construction of the Second Amendment to their citizens and policies." On April 7, 2015, the U.S. Court of Appeals for the Seventh Circuit had dismissed Morrisey's arguments, saying: "Assault weapons with large-capacity magazines can fire more shots, faster, and thus can be more dangerous in aggregate. Why else are they the weapons of choice in mass shootings?"

Peruta v. County of San Diego. On June 9, 2016, the 9th U.S. Circuit Court of Appeals held in Peruta v. County of San Diego that "the Second Amendment does not preserve or protect a right of a member of the general public to carry concealed firearms in public." This was contrary to Morrisey's and other state attorneys general's claim that "New York's outright prohibition of semi-automatic firearms burdens the fundamental right to keep and bear arms" and "New York's ban of semi-automatic firearms cannot survive strict scrutiny."

Kolbe v. Hogan. In August 2017, Morrisey led a 21-state coalition to urge the Supreme Court to hear arguments against, and urging the court to strike down, a weapons ban in Maryland. His coalition argued that the ban infringed on law-abiding gun owners' rights. The Maryland ban prohibits the sales, transfer, and possession of certain semiautomatic firearms and standard-capacity magazines. The coalition, in its brief with the Supreme Court, referred to a ruling by the 4th U.S. Circuit Court of Appeals that struck down the ban. If the appeals court's decision is upheld, it would set case law that governs similar laws in West Virginia, Maryland, North Carolina, South Carolina, and Virginia.

=== Supreme Court ===
In January 2017, President Trump nominated Judge Neil Gorsuch to the Supreme Court to replace the late Antonin Scalia. The next day, Morrisey and 19 other state attorneys general sent Senate leaders a letter expressing support for Gorsuch and urging his immediate confirmation. Morrisey said he wrote the letter out of concern for the court's impact on West Virginia residents, citing a 2016 court decision (5–4, with Scalia in the majority) to stay President Obama's Clean Power Plan, which Morrisey believed would put people out of work.

=== 2020 presidential election intervention ===
On December 8, 2020, Texas Attorney General Ken Paxton sued the states of Georgia, Michigan, Wisconsin, and Pennsylvania, where certified results showed Joe Biden had defeated Trump in the 2020 presidential election.

Morrisey signed an amicus brief led by Paxton seeking to overturn the results of the presidential election by challenging election processes in four states Trump lost. The news came after West Virginia Governor Jim Justice, who had yet to congratulate Biden for winning the presidency, said Trump called him to discuss the lawsuit. He said he encouraged Morrisey to join Paxton's effort. "I'm sure our attorney general will make the right move", Justice, a strong Trump supporter, said.

Secretary of State Mac Warner was the last in the nation to certify his state's winner in the presidential race. He called the Texas lawsuit a "novel approach" and supported letting the courts decide.

Texas and 16 other state attorneys general who supported Paxton's challenge of the election results alleged numerous instances of unconstitutional actions in the four states' presidential ballot tallies, arguments that had already been rejected in other state and federal courts. In Texas v. Pennsylvania, Paxton asked the United States Supreme Court to invalidate the states' 62 electoral votes, allowing Trump to be declared the winner of the election. Because the suit has been characterized as a dispute between states, the Supreme Court retains original jurisdiction, though it frequently declines to hear such suits. There was no evidence of consequential illegal voting in the election. Paxton's lawsuit included claims that had been tried unsuccessfully in other courts and shown to be false. Officials from each of the four states said Paxton's lawsuit recycled false and disproved claims of irregularity. Legal experts and politicians sharply criticized the objections' merit. Election law expert Rick Hasen called the suit "the dumbest case I've ever seen filed on an emergency basis at the Supreme Court." U.S. Senator Ben Sasse said it "looks like a fella begging for a pardon filed a PR stunt", in reference to Paxton's securities fraud charges and abuse of office allegations. On December 11, the U.S. Supreme Court quickly rejected the suit in an unsigned opinion.

== 2018 U.S. Senate election ==
On July 10, 2017, Morrisey announced his candidacy for the U.S. Senate seat held by Joe Manchin. During the Republican primary, he presented himself as an outsider, in contrast to Representative Evan Jenkins. Jenkins and Don Blankenship attacked Morrisey for his career as a lobbyist. Amid the criticism of his lobbying career, as well as his wife's lobbying career, the Morrisey campaign pledged that his wife would stop lobbying if Morrisey were elected to the Senate. On May 8, 2018, Morrisey defeated Jenkins and Blankenship in the primary with more than 34% of the vote (47,571 votes).

In general election, Manchin defeated Morrisey with 49.6% of the vote to Morrisey's 46.3%. Libertarian candidate Rusty Hollen received 4.2%.

== Governor of West Virginia (2025–present) ==
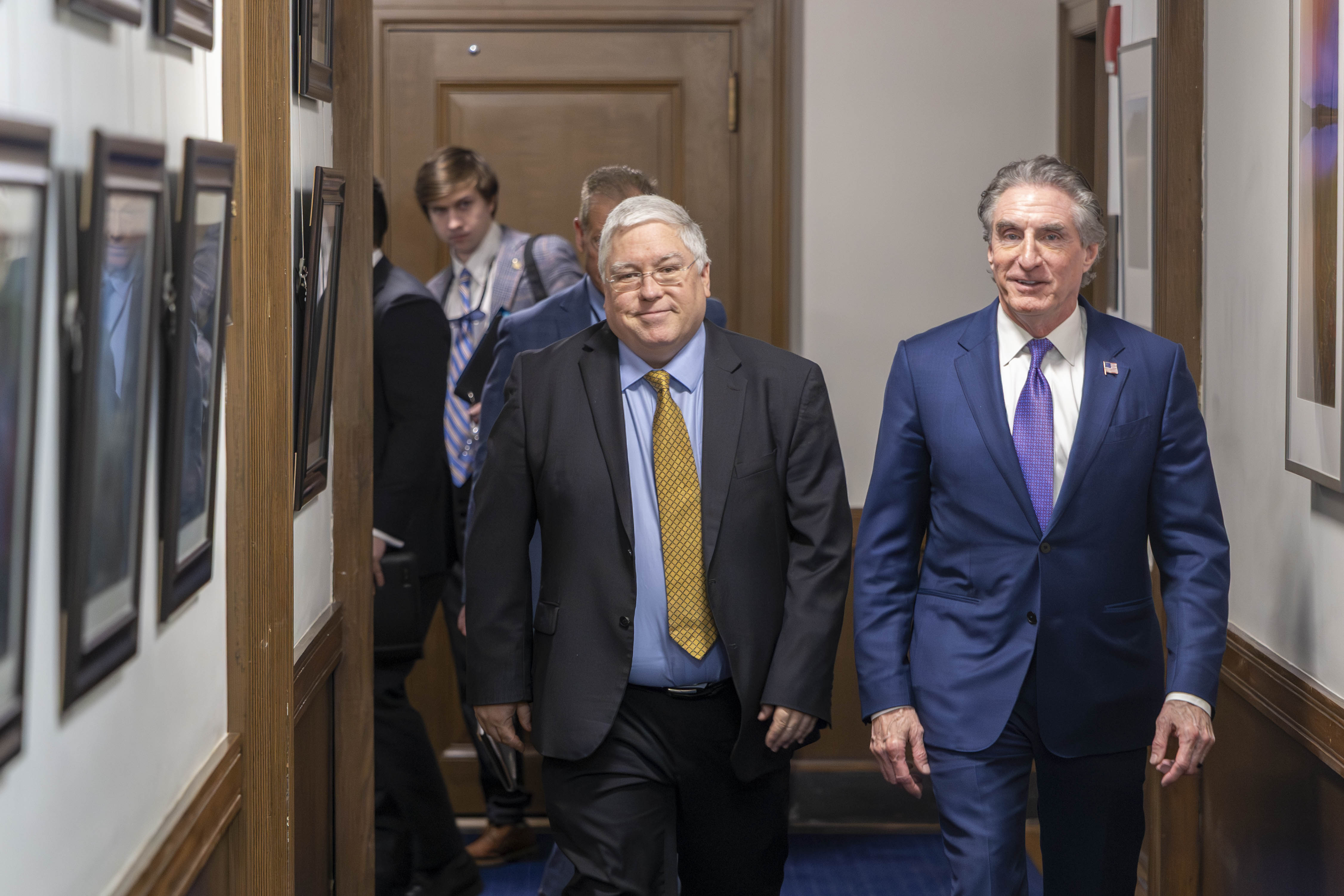
Morrisey discussing with Doug Burgum in 2026

On April 4, 2023, Morrisey announced his candidacy for governor of West Virginia in the 2024 election. He defeated State Delegate Moore Capito in the Republican primary and Democratic nominee Stephen T. Williams, the mayor of Huntington, West Virginia, in the general election.

On January 13, 2025, Morrisey was sworn in as governor of West Virginia. On March 17, he spoke out against the National Collegiate Athletic Association (NCAA) for omitting West Virginia from its men's basketball tournament. He placed a sign on his podium that read "National Corrupt Athletic Association" and called the NCAA's decision "a miscarriage of justice and robbery at the highest levels". Morrisey said he would investigate the NCAA and consider suing it.

As governor, Morrisey has pushed for legislation to exempt parents from mandatory vaccines for their children on religious grounds. In March 2025, the West Virginia legislature failed to pass such legislation. In March 2025, Morrisey appeared with U.S. Secretary of Health and Human Services Robert F. Kennedy Jr. in a MAHA event to promote and support a SNAP waiver under which SNAP would not cover soda and SNAP recipients would have expanded work, training, and educational requirements. At the event, Kennedy told Morrisey he looked like he had eaten Governor Morrisey and suggested a carnivore diet and regularly tracking his weight, all of which provoked controversy.

In August 2025, Morrisey announced the "50 by 50" initiative. Its goal is for West Virginia to expand its electrical generating capacity from 16 gigawatts to 50 gigawatts by 2050, primarily by expanding the usage of coal in the state. The initiative aims to make West Virginia a vital player in artificial intelligence.

In September 2025, Morrisey announced that West Virginia would no longer invest in Chinese-owned companies, calling China a national security risk.

In April 2026, Morrisey vetoed legislation meant to help foster kids transition out of care, as well as a bill meant to prevent kids from entering foster care in the first place, days after signing a 5% cut to the state's personal income tax.

In July 2026, Morrisey's office delayed applications for the West Virginia School Clothing Voucher, a state program that offers vouchers for low-income families to buy clothes for their children before the start of the school year, for almost three weeks, with applications opening on July 20 after being scheduled to open on July 1. Morrisey later said he was concerned that around 50% of the money from the vouchers was withdrawn from ATMs, saying this could lead to abuse of the program's funds by the recipients, though he offered no evidence that this occurred.

== Political positions ==
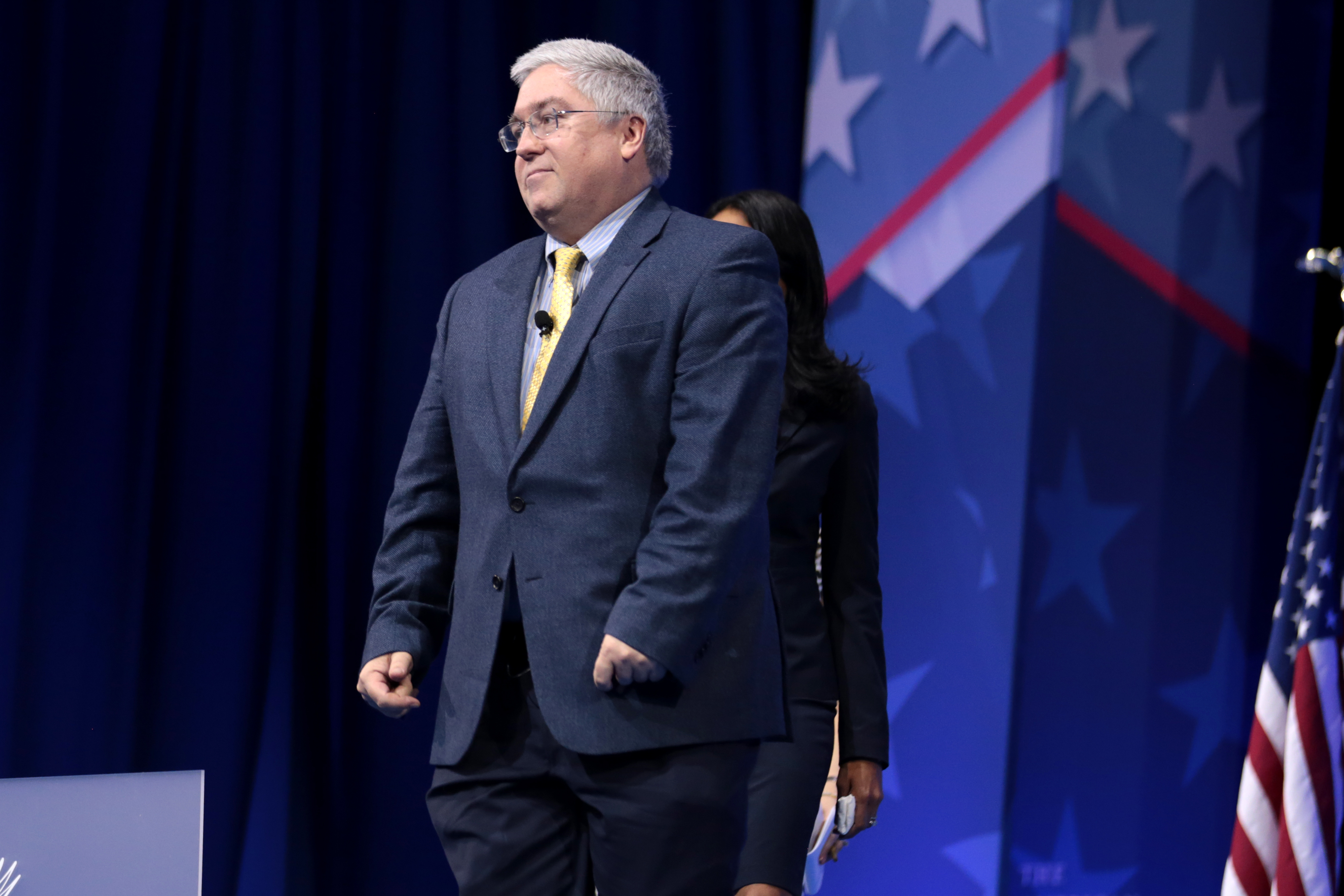
Morrisey at the 2017 Conservative Political Action Conference

West Virginia Democratic Party Chair Mike Pushkin has called Morissey an "ideologue" who will strongly promote "a very aggressive conservative agenda". West Virginia Republican Party Chair Matt Herridge has called him a uniter for a new populist and worker-focused Republican Party. Morrisey has said he will not "allow the elites in the swamp to impose their values on West Virginia citizens".

=== Abortion ===
Morrisey opposes abortion and joined 12 states in supporting a brief in favor of North Carolina's 20-week abortion ban. He investigated Planned Parenthood's activities in West Virginia and was endorsed for the U.S. Senate by West Virginians for Life. Morrisey hardened his position on abortion since his first run for Congress in New Jersey in 2000. During that race, he opposed a constitutional amendment banning abortion and supported exceptions for rape, incest, and the life of the mother.

Morrisey was a staunch supporter of overturning Roe v. Wade.

=== Economy ===
Morrisey supports reducing West Virginia's income tax.

=== Education ===
Morrisey supports increasing school vouchers, civics education, and eliminating "the woke virus from the schools". He said that West Virginia's schools will be for learning, not social experiments, radical agendas, brainwashing, or "confusion about the differences between boys and girls".

=== Opioid addiction ===
Morrisey promoted a "Combating Addiction with Grace" partnership, a joint effort between law enforcement and faith leaders to combat opioid abuse. He also focused on attempting to substitute opioids with other non-narcotics as first-treatments for pain management. Morrisey asked West Virginia lawmakers to consider an "anti-retaliation" program to eliminate negative consequences inflicted on prescribers who refuse to issue opioid medications, which passed in 2018.

Morrisey supported President Trump's declaration of the opioid crisis as a national emergency.

=== Sanctuary cities ===
Morrisey led a coalition of state attorneys general in defending the right of states to prohibit sanctuary cities within their borders. A unanimous federal appeals court decision found in favor of the states.

=== Guns ===
Morrisey has A+ grades from the National Rifle Association Political Victory Fund (NRA-PVF) and the West Virginia Citizen's Defense League. He secured reciprocity agreements with other states, making their concealed carry licenses valid in West Virginia and vice versa.

=== LGBTQ issues ===
Morrisey advocated a 2021 law prohibiting transgender athletes from competing in West Virginia and defended it in court as attorney general. He said he will ask the U.S. Supreme Court to review rulings that West Virginia's refusal to cover transgender health care is discriminatory.

=== Immigration ===
In July 2017, Texas Attorney General Ken Paxton led a group of Republican attorneys general from nine other states, including Morrisey, plus Idaho Governor Butch Otter, in threatening the Donald Trump administration to litigate if Trump did not terminate the Deferred Action for Childhood Arrivals (DACA) policy that President Barack Obama had put in place. On September 5, 2017, Trump rescinded DACA. He delayed implementation for six months to allow Congress the time to legislate a solution for young people eligible for DACA. Morrisey said: "I applaud President Trump for having the courage of his convictions to uphold the rule of law and stop this Obama-era program. DACA was unconstitutional and represented an unlawful, unilateral action by the Obama administration."

In June 2018, Morrisey was among Republican candidates for the U.S. Senate seeking blame the Trump administration family separation policy on their Democratic opponents. He criticized Joe Manchin for supporting the "Keep Families Together Act" authored by Dianne Feinstein, arguing that Manchin was "putting the interest of illegal immigrant criminals and the agenda of liberal Washington elites ahead of West Virginia families."

=== Drug companies ===
In 2013, questions arose about Morrisey's ties to Cardinal Health, his campaign funds, and the ongoing lawsuit against Cardinal Health. After Morrisey said he had recused himself from the suit, he met privately on several occasions with representatives of the company. Eventually, Cardinal Health settled a lawsuit brought by the state attorney general's office by paying a $20,000,000 fine for violating consumer protection laws.

In 2016, Morrisey ended a lawsuit against Miami-Luken, a drug firm that sold excessive and suspicious amounts of opioids to small towns across West Virginia, after the firm paid $2.5 million to settle. According to The Charleston Gazette, "Morrisey, a former lobbyist for a trade group that represents Miami-Luken and other drug distributors, inherited the lawsuit in 2013 after ousting longtime Attorney General Darrell McGraw." It was the largest settlement against pharmaceutical companies in West Virginia history.

=== Vaccination ===
Morrisey issued an executive order allowing religious exemptions from school vaccine mandates.

=== Sex trafficking ===
In 2017, Morrisey joined a coalition of 50 state and territorial attorneys general in pushing Congress to pass legislation that would affirm that all law enforcement agencies retain their traditional authority to fight sex trafficking. In a letter to Congress, the group asked to amend the Communications Decency Act to legally confirm that states, localities, and territories retain authority to investigate and prosecute child sex trafficking criminals wherever they operate, including online.

=== Diversity, equity, and inclusion ===
Morrisey supports eliminating diversity, equity, and inclusion (DEI) policies to "stomp out woke". He issued an executive order ending all DEI initiatives at government institutions.

== Personal life ==
Morrisey has lived in Jefferson County, West Virginia, since 2006. His wife, Denise Henry Morrisey, is a founding partner at the lobbying firm Capitol Counsel. Morrisey has a stepdaughter.

== Electoral history ==
New Jersey 7th Congressional District Republican Primary Election, 2000
Party	Candidate	Votes	%
Republican	Mike Ferguson	10,504	42.54
Republican	Tom Kean Jr.	6,838	27.69
Republican	Joel Weingarten	5,115	20.71
Republican	Patrick Morrisey	2,237	9.06
Total votes		24,794	100.0

West Virginia Attorney General Election, 2012
Party	Candidate	Votes	%
Republican	Patrick Morrisey	329,854	51.24
Democratic	Darrell McGraw Jr. (incumbent)	313,830	48.76
Total votes		643,684	100.0

West Virginia Attorney General Election, 2016
Party	Candidate	Votes	%
Republican	Patrick Morrisey (incumbent)	358,424	51.63
Democratic	Doug Reynolds	291,232	41.95
Libertarian	Karl Kolenich	24,023	3.46
Mountain	Michael Sharley	20,475	2.95
Total votes		694,154	100.0

West Virginia United States Senate Republican Primary Election, 2018
Party	Candidate	Votes	%
Republican	Patrick Morrisey	48,007	34.90
Republican	Evan Jenkins	40,185	29.21
Republican	Don Blankenship	27,478	19.97
Republican	Thomas Willis	13,540	9.84
Republican	Bo Copley	4,248	3.09
Republican	Jack Newbrough	4,115	2.99
Total votes		137,573	100.0

West Virginia United States Senate General Election, 2018
Party	Candidate	Votes	%
Democratic	Joe Manchin	290,510	49.57
Republican	Patrick Morrisey	271,113	46.26
Libertarian	Rusty Hollen	24,411	4.17
Total votes		586,034	100.0

West Virginia Attorney General Election, 2020
Party	Candidate	Votes	%
Republican	Patrick Morrisey	487,250	63.77
Democratic	Sam Brown Petsonk	276,798	36.23
Total votes		764,048	100.0

West Virginia Gubernatorial Election, 2024
Party	Candidate	Votes	%
Republican	Patrick Morrisey	459,300	61.99
Democratic	Stephen T. Williams	233,976	31.58
Libertarian	Erika Kolenich	21,288	2.87
Constitution	S. Marshall Wilson	16,828	2.27
Mountain	Chase Linko-Looper	9,596	1.30
Write-in		10	0.0
Total votes		740,998	100.0

Party political offices
Preceded by Daniel Greear	Republican nominee for Attorney General of West Virginia; 2012, 2016, 2020	Succeeded by JB McCuskey
Preceded by John Raese	Republican nominee for U.S. Senator from West Virginia (Class 1); 2018	Succeeded by Jim Justice
Preceded by Jim Justice	Republican nominee for Governor of West Virginia; 2024	Most recent
Legal offices
Preceded by Darrell McGraw	Attorney General of West Virginia; 2013–2025	Succeeded by JB McCuskey
Political offices
Preceded by Jim Justice	Governor of West Virginia; 2025–present	Incumbent
U.S. order of precedence (ceremonial)
Preceded by JD Vance as Vice President	Order of precedence of the United States; Within West Virginia	Succeeded by Mayor of city in which event is held
Preceded by JD Vance as Vice President	Order of precedence of the United States; Within West Virginia	Succeeded by Otherwise Mike Johnson as Speaker of the United States House of Representatives
Preceded by Laura Kelly as Governor of Kansas	Order of precedence of the United States; Outside West Virginia	Succeeded by Joe Lombardo as Governor of Nevada
