= Debbie Warner =

American politician

Member of the West Virginia House of Representatives from the 82nd district
- In office December 1, 2022 – December 1, 2024
- Succeeded by: David McCormick

Personal details
- Born: Charleston, West Virginia, U.S.
- Party: Republican
- Spouse: Mac Warner
- Children: 4
- Education: University of Kentucky (BS)
- Occupation: Real estate agent

Debbie Law Warner is an American politician who served as a member of the West Virginia House of Delegates from the 82nd district. Elected on November 8, 2022, she assumed office on December 1, 2022 and left office on December 1, 2024. She previously ran for a seat in 2018 but lost to Democrat Barbara Fleischauer.

== Biography ==
Warner was born in Charleston, West Virginia, and now resides in Cheat Lake, West Virginia. She got a Bachelor of Science from the University of Kentucky. Warner is married to Secretary of State of West Virginia Mac Warner. They have four children together, 2 sons 2 daughters, all serving in the United States Armed Forces. She is a Christian.
