= Kris Warner =

American politician

31st Secretary of State of West Virginia
- Incumbent
- Assumed office January 13, 2025
- Governor: Patrick Morrisey
- Preceded by: Mac Warner

Personal details
- Born: 1961 or 1962 (age 63–64)
- Party: Republican
- Relatives: Kasey Warner (brother); Mac Warner (brother)
- Education: West Virginia University

Kris Warner (born 1961/1962) is an American politician who is currently serving as the 31st Secretary of State of West Virginia since 2025. He was previously the director of the state’s Economic Development Authority and as the former chair of the West Virginia Republican Party.

== Career ==
In early 2024, Warner entered the race for Secretary of State, succeeding his brother, Mac Warner, the outgoing Secretary of State. He won the Republican primary, defeating several opponents despite being outspent. His primary campaign received support from the Conservative Policy Action PAC, chaired by former West Virginia Administration Secretary Mark Scott. The PAC’s ties to beneficiaries of the Economic Development Authority drew scrutiny, leading one of Warner’s opponents, Ken Reed, to file a complaint requesting an investigation. However, the Secretary of State’s office noted it could not confirm or deny the existence of such an investigation due to state law.

Warner’s campaign focused on his experience in public service and economic development. During his campaign, Warner addressed election integrity questions, differing from his brother’s position by stating he did not believe the 2020 election had been “stolen” in West Virginia, though he did not comment on elections in other states.

In the November 2024 general election, Warner defeated Democrat Thornton Cooper, securing approximately 70 percent of the vote according to preliminary results. His campaign financial reports indicated he had outraised Cooper significantly, with Warner’s funds totaling $157,000 to Cooper’s $22,000 as of mid-October.

Political offices
Preceded by Mac Warner	Secretary of State of West Virginia; 2025–present	Incumbent
