= Kasey Warner =

American lawyer

United States Attorney for the Southern District of West Virginia
- In office 2001–2005
- President: George W. Bush
- Preceded by: Rebecca Betts

Personal details
- Born: Karl Kudrian Warner II
- Relatives: Kris Warner (brother); Mac Warner (brother)
- Education: U.S. Military Academy (BA); West Virginia University (JD); JAG School, University of Virginia
- Profession: Attorney

Military service
- Allegiance: United States
- Branch/service: United States Army
- Years of service: 1974–2001
- Rank: Colonel
- Unit: J.A.G. Corps

Karl Kuldrian "Kasey" Warner II is an American attorney who served as the United States Attorney for the Southern District of West Virginia.

== Early life and education ==
Kasey Warner graduated from United States Military Academy at West Point in 1974. Warner then graduated from the West Virginia University School of Law in 1980. Warner attended JAG School at the University of Virginia and entered U.S. Army JAG Corps.

== Career ==
Warner was a Multinational Force Staff JAG at Port-au-Prince, Haiti from 1994 until 1995. He served as a Deputy Legal Counsel to the Chairman of the Joint Chiefs of Staff. George W. Bush appointed him as a United States Attorney in 2001. He retired from active duty military service in 2001 to accept appointment as United States Attorney. In 2005, Warner one of the U.S. attorneys who were fired by the Bush administration under a clause of the PATRIOT Act in the Bush Administration U.S. Attorney Dismissal Controversy.
