= 2020 West Virginia gubernatorial election =

- November 3, 2020
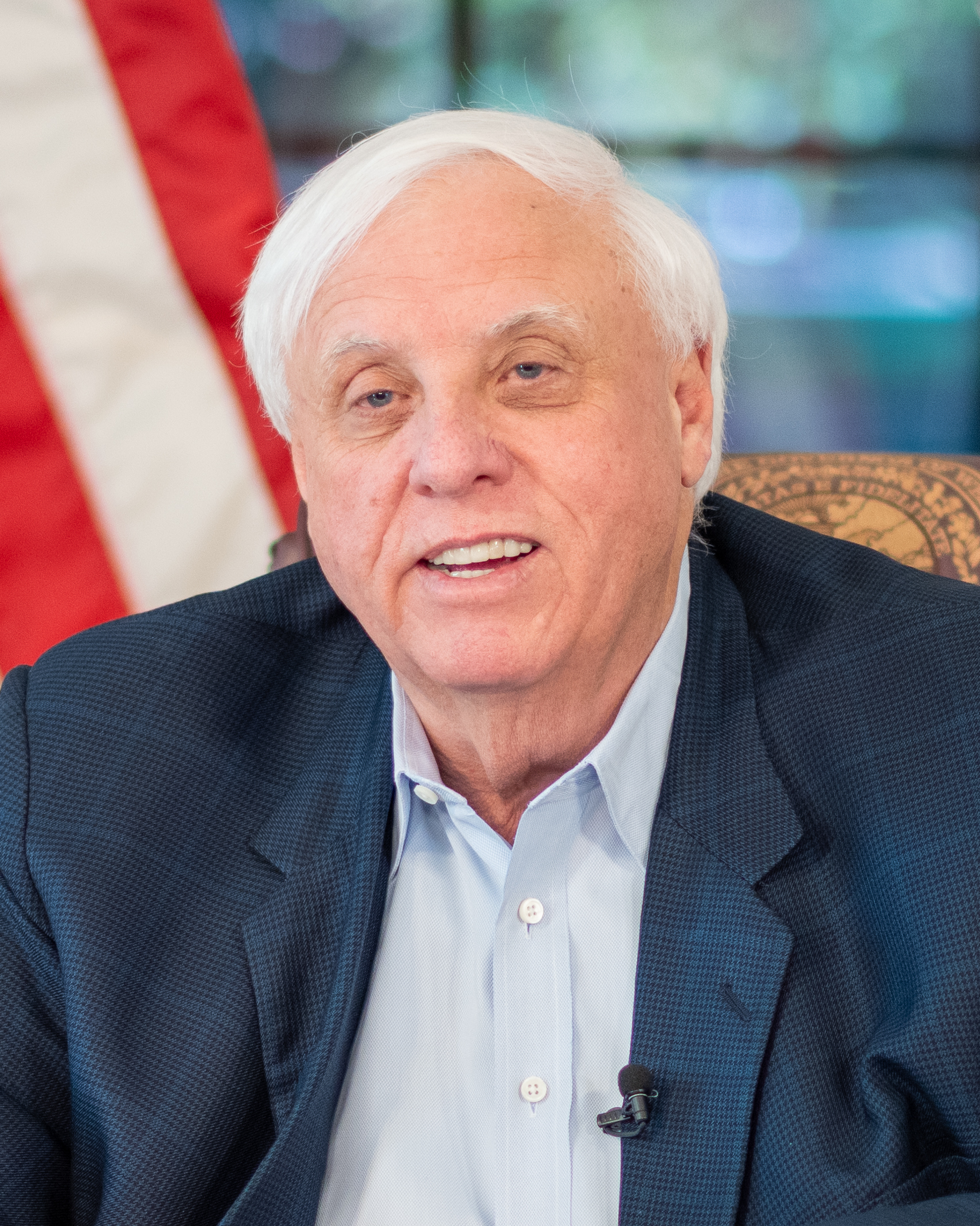

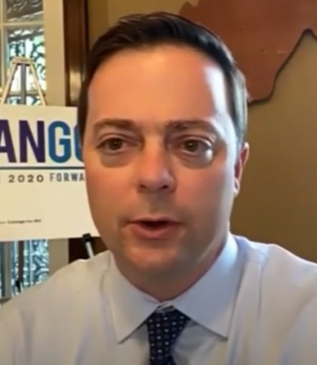
Nominee	Jim Justice	Ben Salango
Party	Republican	Democratic
Popular vote	497,944	237,024
Percentage	63.49%	30.22%
- Justice: 40–50% 50–60% 60–70% 70–80% 80–90% >90% Salango: 40–50% 50–60% 60–70% 70–80% 80–90%
Governor before election
Jim Justice
Republican
Elected Governor
Jim Justice
Republican

The 2020 West Virginia gubernatorial election was held on November 3, 2020, to elect the governor of West Virginia, concurrently with the 2020 U.S. presidential election, as well as elections to the United States Senate, elections to the United States House of Representatives and various state and local elections.

Incumbent Governor Jim Justice announced his 2020 re-election campaign on January 7, 2019. Justice was elected in 2016 as a Democrat, but later switched back to the Republican Party at an August 2017 campaign rally with Donald Trump. Justice won re-election to a second term, defeating Democratic Kanawha County commissioner Ben Salango. Justice's re-election made him the first Republican to be elected governor of West Virginia since Cecil Underwood in 1996. Additionally, Justice became the first incumbent Republican governor to win re-election since Arch A. Moore Jr. in 1972, as well as the first Republican to carry all counties in West Virginia. However, Justice performed worse than Republican presidential candidate Donald Trump, who outperformed Justice by 5.13 percentage points. Additionally, Salango slightly outperformed Biden by 0.53 percentage points. Justice's 33% margin is the largest margin for a Republican in West Virginia history

== Republican primary ==
=== Candidates ===
==== Nominee ====
- Jim Justice, incumbent governor

==== Eliminated in primary ====
- Shelby Jean Fitzhugh, retiree
- Michael Folk, former state delegate
- Brooke Lunsford, insurance agent
- Chuck Sheedy, U.S. Army veteran
- Doug Six, surveyor
- Woody Thrasher, former West Virginia Secretary of Commerce (2017–2018)

==== Declined ====
- David McKinley, incumbent U.S. Representative for West Virginia's 1st congressional district (running for re-election)
- Mac Warner, Secretary of State of West Virginia (running for re-election)

=== Polling ===
Poll source	Date(s) administered	Sample size (Note: Key: A – all adults RV – registered voters LV – likely voters V – unclear)	Margin of error	Jim Justice	Mike Folk	Woody Thrasher	Other / Undecided
Triton Polling & Research/WMOV	May 18–26, 2020	719 (LV)	± 3.7%	53%	15%	14%	18% (Note: Undecided with 12%, Doug Six with 2.0%; Shelby Fitzhugh with 1.8%; Brooke Lunsford with 1.2%; Chuck Sheedy with 0.6%)
WPA Intelligence (R) (Note: Poll conducted for Woody Thrasher)	December 16–18, 2019	502 (LV)	± 4.4%	38%	6%	30%	26%'
Research America Inc.	December 4–9, 2019	229 (LV)	–	56%	11%	21%	12%
Public Opinion Strategies (R)	August 24–25, 2019	– (Note: Not available)	–	56%	–	26%	18%
Research America Inc.	August 14–22, 2019	216 (LV)	–	53%	12%	19%	17%'
WPA Intelligence (Note: Poll sponsored by Woody Thrasher's campaign)	August 13–14, 2019	509 (V)	–	38%	11%	23%	28%
WPA Intelligence (Note: Poll sponsored by Woody Thrasher's campaign)	March 7–10, 2019	509 (V)	–	58%	5%	5%	32%

=== Results ===
Results by county: Justice: 40–50%; 50–60%; 60–70%; 70–80%; 80–90%; Folk 40–50%

Republican primary results
Party	Candidate	Votes	%
Republican	Jim Justice (incumbent)	133,258	62.70%
Republican	Woody Thrasher	38,898	18.30%
Republican	Michael Folk	26,735	12.58%
Republican	Doug Six	4,429	2.08%
Republican	Brooke Lunsford	3,849	1.81%
Republican	Shelly Jean Fitzhugh	2,799	1.32%
Republican	Chuck Sheedy	2,552	1.20%
Total votes		212,520	100.00%

== Democratic primary ==
=== Candidates ===
==== Nominee ====
- Ben Salango, Kanawha County commissioner

==== Eliminated in primary ====
- Douglas Hughes, environmental permit writer for West Virginia Department of Environmental Protection
- Jody Murphy, businessman
- Stephen Smith, community organizer
- Ron Stollings, state senator

==== Declined ====
- Booth Goodwin, former United States Attorney and candidate for Governor of West Virginia in 2016
- Joe Manchin, incumbent U.S. Senator and former Governor of West Virginia

=== Endorsements ===
Ben Salango

Federal politicians

- Joe Manchin, U.S. Senator (WV)

Individuals

- Maj. Gen. (Ret.) Allen E. Tackett, former West Virginia National Guard adjutant general (1995-2010)

Organizations

- West Virginia AFL–CIO

Newspapers

- Charleston Gazette-Mail
Stephen Smith

Federal politicians

- Elizabeth Warren, U.S. Senator (MA)

Organizations

- People for the American Way Next Up
- Planned Parenthood Votes! South Atlantic
- Progressive Change Campaign Committee
- Rise Up West Virginia
- Working Families Party
Ron Stollings

State legislators

- Corey Palumbo, West Virginia State Senator from the 17th and 8th districts (2009-present)

=== Polling ===
Poll source	Date(s) administered	Sample size	Margin of error	Ben Salango	Stephen Smith	Ron Stollings	Other / Undecided
Triton Polling & Research/WMOV	May 18–26, 2020	231 (LV)	± 6.4%	30%	27%	10%	33% (Note: Undecided with 29%, Jody Murphy with 2.9%; Douglas Hughes with 1.3%)
Research America/MetroNews	December 4–10, 2019	220 (LV)	± 4.4%	18%	21%	19%	46% (Note: Undecided with 42%, Cecil Silva with 1.8%; Jody Murphy with 1.4%; Edwin Vanover with 0.5%)

=== Results ===
Results by county: Salango: Salango—60–70%; Salango—50–60%; Salango—40–50%; Salango—30–40%; Smith: Smith—30–40%; Smith—40–50%; Smith—50–60%; Stollings: Stollings—50–60%; Stollings—70–80%; Murphy: Murphy—30–40%; Murphy—40–50%

Democratic primary results
Party	Candidate	Votes	%
Democratic	Ben Salango	74,805	38.68%
Democratic	Stephen Smith	65,544	33.89%
Democratic	Ron Stollings	25,782	13.33%
Democratic	Jody Murphy	18,039	9.33%
Democratic	Douglas Hughes	9,231	4.77%
Total votes		193,401	100.00%

== Other candidates ==
=== Mountain Party ===
The Mountain Party received over 5% of the vote in 2016 with former State Senator and Delegate Charlotte Pritt as the party's gubernatorial nominee. The party nominates its candidate for governor by convention per its bylaws.

==== Nominee ====
- Daniel Lutz, Eastern Panhandle Conservation District Supervisor representing Jefferson County, and commissioned U.S. Air Force veteran

==== Endorsements ====
Daniel Lutz

Organizations

- Eastern Panhandle Green Coalition, environmental organization
- Jefferson County Vision, sustainability organization

=== Libertarian Party ===
==== Nominee ====
- Erika Kolenich, trial attorney

=== Write-ins ===
The following candidates were certified write-in candidates.

==== Declared ====
- Quintin Gerard Caldwell
- Michael Folk, former State Delegate (sought the nomination of the Republican Party)
- Kimberly Gross
- Mitch Roberts
- Marshall Wilson, State Delegate (Independent)

== General election ==
=== Predictions ===
Source	Ranking	As of
The Cook Political Report	Safe R	October 23, 2020
Inside Elections	Safe R	October 28, 2020
Sabato's Crystal Ball	Likely R	November 2, 2020
Politico	Likely R	November 2, 2020
Daily Kos	Safe R	October 28, 2020
RCP	Safe R	November 2, 2020
270towin	Likely R	November 2, 2020

=== Endorsements ===
Ben Salango (D)

Federal politicians

- Joe Manchin, U.S. Senator (WV)

Individuals

- Jennifer Garner, actress
- Maj. Gen. (Ret.) Allen E. Tackett, former West Virginia National Guard adjutant general (1995-2010)

Organizations

- United Mine Workers of America
- West Virginia AFL–CIO

Newspapers

- Charleston Gazette-Mail

=== Polling ===
View source data.

Poll source	Date(s) administered	Sample size	Margin of error	Jim Justice (R)	Ben Salango (D)	Daniel Lutz (M)	Erika Kolenich (L)	Undecided
Triton Polling and Research	October 19–21, 2020	544 (LV)	± 4.2%	53%	35%	3%	3%	5%
Research America Inc.	October 1–6, 2020	450 (LV)	± 4.6%	53%	34%	2%	5%	6%
Triton Polling & Research	September 29–30, 2020 (Note: Additional data sourced from FiveThirtyEight)	525 (RV)	± 4.3%	48%	38%	4%	4%	6%
Strategies Unlimited (Note: Poll sponsored by West Virginia First, which opposed Jim Justice's reelection bid prior to this poll's sampling period.)	September 26–30, 2020	600 (LV)	± 4%	46%	40%	5%	–	8%
Mark Blankenship Enterprises (R) (Note: Poll sponsored by Justice's campaign.)	September 10–14, 2020	504 (LV)	± 4.3%	54%	27%	9% (Note: Split between Danny Lutz (M) and Erika Kolenich (L))		10%

Hypothetical polling

Jim Justice vs. Joe Manchin

Poll source	Date(s) administered	Sample size	Margin of error	Jim Justice (R)	Joe Manchin (D)	Other / Undecided
Research America/MetroNews	August 14–22, 2019	501 (RV)	± 4.4%	39%	49%	12%

=== Results ===
West Virginia gubernatorial election, 2020
Party	Candidate	Votes	%	±%
Republican	Jim Justice (incumbent)	497,944	63.49%	+21.19%
Democratic	Ben Salango	237,024	30.22%	−18.87%
Libertarian	Erika Kolenich	22,527	2.87%	+0.72%
Americans Coming Together	S. Marshall Wilson (write-in)	15,120	1.93%	N/A
Mountain	Daniel Lutz	11,309	1.44%	−4.45%
Write-in		363	0.05%	N/A
Total votes		784,287	100.00%	
Turnout		802,726	63.25%	
Registered electors		1,269,219		
Republican hold				

==== By county ====
County	Jim Justice Republican		Ben Salango Democratic		Various candidates Other parties		Margin		Total
County	#	%	#	%	#	%	#	%	Total
Barbour	4,783	73.0%	1,419	21.7%	350	5.3%	3,654	51.3%	6,552
Berkeley	28,841	60.2%	15,253	31.8%	3,083	8.0%	13,588	28.4%	47,897
Boone	5,765	65.2%	2,829	32.0%	246	2.8%	2,936	33.2%	8,840
Braxton	3,799	68.5%	1,492	26.9%	254	4.6%	2,307	41.6%	5,545
Brooke	6,840	65.7%	2,964	28.5%	605	5.8%	3,876	37.2%	10,409
Cabell	20,750	57.3%	14,151	39.1%	1,284	3.6%	6,599	18.2%	36,185
Calhoun	2,141	74.2%	632	21.9%	113	3.9%	1,509	52.3%	2,886
Clay	2,370	73.6%	734	22.8%	114	3.5%	1,636	50.8%	3,218
Doddridge	2,330	78.6%	473	16.0%	161	5.4%	1,857	62.6%	2,964
Fayette	10,076	62.1%	5,587	34.5%	551	3.4%	4,489	27.6%	16,214
Gilmer	1,773	68.7%	623	24.1%	184	7.1%	1,150	44.6%	2,580
Grant	4,302	83.4%	609	11.8%	246	4.7%	3,693	72.2%	5,157
Greenbrier	10,973	70.8%	4,053	26.2%	469	3.0%	6,920	44.6%	15,495
Hampshire	7,111	74.9%	1,835	19.3%	547	5.7%	5,276	65.6%	9,493
Hancock	8,995	66.6%	3,868	28.6%	648	4.8%	5,127	38.0%	13,511
Hardy	4,364	71.3%	1,471	24.0%	285	4.6%	2,893	47.3%	6,120
Harrison	19,074	64.6%	8,778	29.7%	1,685	5.7%	10,296	34.9%	29,537
Jackson	8,932	70.0%	3,418	26.8%	401	3.1%	5,514	43.2%	12,751
Jefferson	14,010	52.2%	10,563	39.4%	2,245	8.4%	3,447	12.8%	26,818
Kanawha	41,310	51.3%	37,101	46.1%	2,092	2.6%	4,209	5.2%	80,503
Lewis	5,407	73.8%	1,393	19.0%	525	7.2%	4,014	54.8%	7,325
Lincoln	5,265	69.5%	2,164	28.6%	149	2.0%	3,101	40.9%	7,578
Logan	9,436	74.0%	3,052	23.9%	257	2.1%	6,384	50.1%	12,745
Marion	15,253	60.2%	8,632	34.1%	1,455	5.8%	6,621	26.1%	25,340
Marshall	9,324	67.6%	3,839	27.8%	640	4.7%	5,485	39.8%	13,803
Mason	7,519	69.6%	2,898	26.8%	388	3.6%	4,621	42.8%	10,805
McDowell	4,861	77.4%	1,321	21.0%	98	1.6%	3,540	56.4%	6,280
Mercer	18,340	75.6%	5,052	20.8%	852	3.6%	13,288	54.8%	24,244
Mineral	9,535	75.7%	2,412	19.2%	642	5.1%	7,123	56.5%	12,589
Mingo	7,454	77.0%	2,022	20.9%	208	2.1%	5,432	56.1%	9,684
Monongalia	19,854	48.1%	19,460	47.1%	1,980	4.8%	394	1.0%	41,294
Monroe	4,764	76.6%	1,284	20.6%	175	2.8%	3,480	56.0%	6,223
Morgan	5,948	71.3%	1,850	22.2%	549	6.6%	4,098	49.1%	8,347
Nicholas	7,518	73.6%	2,414	23.6%	287	2.8%	5,104	50.0%	10,219
Ohio	11,775	59.9%	6,984	35.5%	895	4.6%	4,791	24.4%	19,654
Pendleton	2,664	74.4%	774	21.6%	145	4.1%	1,890	52.8%	3,583
Pleasants	2,596	76.5%	670	19.8%	126	3.7%	1,926	56.7%	3,392
Pocahontas	2,737	71.1%	965	25.1%	149	3.9%	1,772	46.0%	3,851
Preston	10,023	71.6%	3,240	23.1%	745	5.3%	6,783	48.5%	14,008
Putnam	17,251	64.0%	8,831	32.8%	868	3.2%	8,420	31.2%	26,950
Raleigh	22,259	69.3%	8,962	27.9%	912	2.8%	13,297	41.4%	32,133
Randolph	7,915	67.5%	3,349	28.6%	454	3.9%	4,566	38.9%	11,718
Ritchie	3,234	79.2%	665	16.3%	183	4.5%	2,569	62.9%	4,082
Roane	4,007	70.8%	1,473	26.0%	180	3.2%	2,534	44.8%	5,660
Summers	3,773	69.5%	1,502	27.7%	156	2.9%	2,271	41.8%	5,431
Taylor	5,058	70.3%	1,769	24.6%	365	5.1%	3,289	45.7%	7,192
Tucker	2,628	70.1%	944	25.2%	179	4.8%	1,684	44.9%	3,751
Tyler	2,746	72.9%	745	19.8%	275	7.3%	2,001	53.1%	3,766
Upshur	6,951	70.0%	1,915	19.3%	1,064	10.7%	5,036	50.7%	9,930
Wayne	11,079	68.5%	4,548	28.1%	553	3.4%	6,531	40.4%	16,180
Webster	2,552	76.4%	659	19.7%	128	3.8%	1,893	56.7%	3,339
Wetzel	4,559	69.6%	1,727	26.4%	267	4.0%	2,832	43.2%	6,553
Wirt	1,947	76.5%	483	19.0%	114	4.5%	1,464	57.5%	2,544
Wood	26,232	69.7%	9,933	26.4%	1,451	3.8%	16,299	43.3%	37,616
Wyoming	6,941	83.4%	1,240	14.9%	139	1.6%	5,701	68.5%	8,320
Totals	497,044	64.8%	237,024	30.8%	33,836	4.4%	260,920	34.0%	768,804

Counties that flipped from Democratic to Republican

- Cabell (largest city: Huntington)
- Calhoun (largest city: Grantsville)
- Clay (largest city: Clay)
- Gilmer (largest city: Glenville)
- Greenbrier (largest city: Lewisburg)
- Jackson (largest city: Ravenswood)
- Marshall (largest city: Moundsville)
- Mason (largest city: Point Pleasant)
- Monongalia (largest city: Morgantown)
- Monroe (largest city: Peterstown)
- Nicholas (largest city: Summersville)
- Ohio (largest city: Wheeling)
- Pendleton (largest city: Franklin)
- Pleasants (largest city: St. Marys)
- Pocahontas (largest city: Marlinton)
- Raleigh (largest city: Beckley)
- Randolph (largest city: Elkins)
- Roane (largest city: Spencer)
- Summers (largest city: Hinton)
- Wayne (largest city: Kenova)
- Wetzel (largest city: New Martinsville)
- Harrison (largest city: Clarksburg)
- Kanawha (largest city: Charleston)
- Lincoln (largest city: Hamlin)
- Wyoming (largest city: Mullens)
- Brooke (largest borough: Wellsburg)
- Fayette (largest city: Fayetteville)
- Logan (largest borough: Logan)
- Mingo (largest borough: Williamson)
- Boone (largest city: Madison)
- Braxton (largest town: Sutton)
- Marion (largest city: Fairmont)
- McDowell (largest city: Welch)
- Webster (largest town: Webster Springs)
- Wirt (largest municipality: Elizabeth)
- Putnam (largest municipality: Hurricane)
- Wood (largest municipality: Parkersburg)

==== By congressional district ====
Justice won all three congressional districts.

District	Justice	Salango	Representative
1st	64%	30%	David McKinley
2nd	59%	33%	Alex Mooney
3rd	68%	27%	Carol Miller

== Notes ==
Partisan clients
