= Natalie Tennant =

American politician (born 1967)

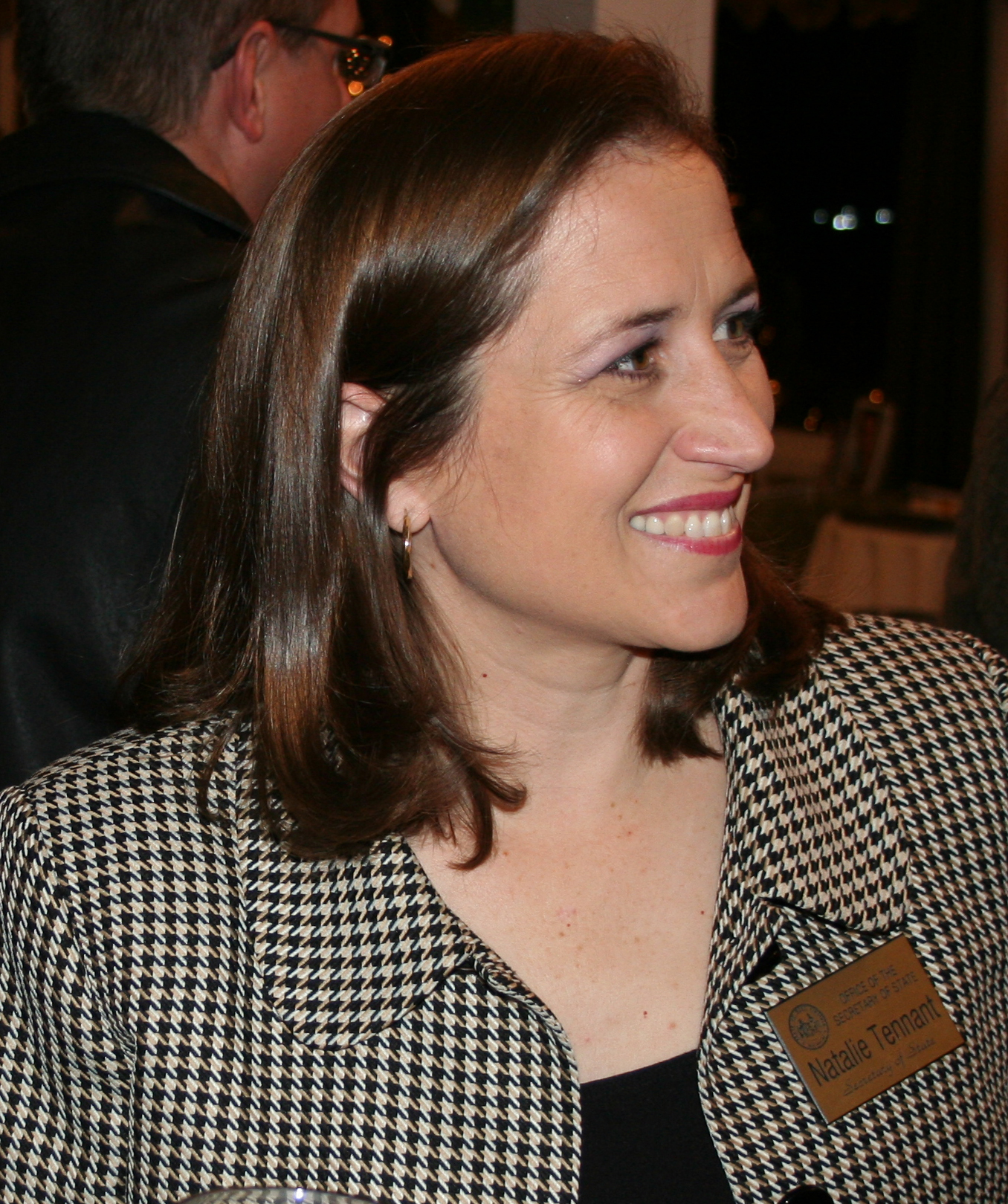
- Tennant in 2011

Member of the Kanawha County Commission
- Incumbent
- Assumed office January 1, 2025
- Preceded by: Marc Slotnick

29th Secretary of State of West Virginia
- In office January 19, 2009 – January 16, 2017
- Governor: Joe Manchin; Earl Ray Tomblin
- Preceded by: Betty Ireland
- Succeeded by: Mac Warner

Personal details
- Born: December 25, 1967 (age 58) Fairmont, West Virginia, U.S.
- Party: Democratic
- Spouse: Erik Wells
- Children: 1
- Education: West Virginia University (BS, MA)

Natalie E. Tennant (born December 25, 1967) is an American politician who served as the Secretary of State of West Virginia from 2009 to 2017. She is a member of the Democratic Party. Tennant was the 2014 Democratic Party nominee for West Virginia's open U.S. Senate seat, which she lost to Republican Shelley Moore Capito. In 2016 she was defeated for re-election by Republican Mac Warner, and left office on January 16, 2017. In a historic win in 2024, Tennant was elected as the first female commissioner on the Kanawha County Commission in its 236 years.

Prior to her election as secretary of state, Tennant was a television reporter and co-owner of a video production company.

== Early life and education ==
Tennant grew up on a farm in Fairview, Marion County, West Virginia, and is the daughter of Rose Mary (née Brunetti) and John D. Tennant, Jr. Her mother was of Italian descent. Tennant is a 1986 graduate of North Marion High School in Farmington, West Virginia.

She graduated from West Virginia University in 1991 with a bachelor's degree in journalism, and she obtained a master's degree in corporate and organizational communication from WVU in 2002. While at WVU, Tennant was selected in 1990 as the first woman to represent the university as the Mountaineers' mascot. The only other women to serve as the Mountaineer were Rebecca Durst, who was selected in 2009, and Mary G. Roush, who was selected in 2022. Tennant was subjected to harassment for being a female Mountaineer. At the selection ceremony where Tennant was named as the new mascot, some of the crowd booed her appointment. Cups were thrown at her, people spit on her, and fans developed chants, suggesting that Tennant needed to "get in the kitchen" and characterizing her as a "mountain deer."

Following completion of her undergraduate degree in 1991, Tennant began her career in television broadcasting and reporting. Tennant remained active in the WVU community, receiving the WVU Alumni Association's Margaret Buchanan Cole Young Alumni Award in 1997.

== West Virginia Secretary of State ==
=== Elections ===
In 2004, Tennant ran unsuccessfully for West Virginia Secretary of State, losing the Democratic primary to Ken Hechler by 1,108 votes.

In 2008, Tennant was elected secretary of state, beating out Republican candidate Charles Minimah with 65% of the vote. During her campaign, she was supported by the Secretary of State Project, a 527 political action committee that supports progressive candidates for secretary of state positions in swing states.

In 2012, Tennant was easily re-elected with more than 62% of the vote against Republican Brian Savilla.

In 2016, Tennant narrowly lost re-election to her Republican challenger, Mac Warner, by less than 2%.

In 2020, Tennant ran to reclaim the Secretary of State's office. On June 9, 2020, she won the primary with 100%, as she was uncontested. She lost to incumbent Republican Mac Warner in the November general election, with approximately 41 percent of the vote, compared to Warner's 59 percent.

In 2024, Tennant was elected a commissioner seat in Kanawha County West Virginia

=== Tenure ===
Tennant took office as the Secretary of State of West Virginia on January 19, 2009.

In 2010, Tennant initiated a pilot online voting program that allowed 179 deployed West Virginian service members to vote via the Internet.

In 2012, the Secretary of State's office issued a Republican primary ballot, which told voters to select 18 at-large delegates to the Republican National Convention when 19 were to be chosen. The error cost West Virginia $148,705 to reprint the ballots and another $64,000 to reprogram the digital voting machines.

Tennant, along with U.S. Attorney Booth Goodwin, led the investigation of the Lincoln County 2010 Democratic primary, in which a large number of absentee ballots were cast in favor of a certain faction of the Democratic party. In early 2012, as a result of the investigation, Lincoln County Sheriff Jerry Bowman and Lincoln County Clerk Donald Whitten pleaded guilty to felony charges. Bowman, Whitten, and Tennant were all elected Democratic officials.

In 2013, Tennant returned $3 million in unused revenue to the state legislature after Tennant's department enacted cost-saving measures and settled two lawsuits for significantly less money than expected.

In 2013, the Secretary of State's office was late sending out change-of-address materials to election officials, which are sent out every two years to keep election rolls accurate. According to the Harrison County Clerk's office, the materials should have arrived at the end of 2013 to give officials time to send them out before the primary election in May 2014, but some county clerks did not receive the materials until April 2014 or later.

In 2014, a number of West Virginian political candidates were unable to file their campaign finance reports on the Secretary of State's website due to issues with the online campaign finance reporting system. Tennant said, "The company that was hired to update the campaign finance reporting system has not met the standards of my office, has not met the standards of the contract or what West Virginians deserve...They are being held accountable."

On January 7, 2016, the Secretary of State's office opened a second location in Fairmont.

== Gubernatorial campaign ==
On January 20, 2011, Tennant announced she was running for the Democratic nomination for Governor of West Virginia in the 2011 special gubernatorial election. Tennant focused her campaign on openness and accountability, which she said had been a hallmark of her tenure as secretary of state.

Public polling conducted in January 2011 showed Tennant to be a front runner in the Democratic primary, alongside acting governor Earl Ray Tomblin. She lost the primary election to acting governor Earl Ray Tomblin, coming in third place behind state house speaker Rick Thompson.

== U.S. Senate campaign ==
Tennant ran for the Senate in 2014. The seat was open after incumbent Democrat Jay Rockefeller announced his retirement. Tennant lost to Republican representative Shelley Moore Capito in the general election, losing every county in the state.

Tennant did not face any significant primary opposition. She entered the race after ten prominent Democrats declined to run. In announcing her campaign, Tennant stated, "I will fight any Republican or any Democrat — including President Barack Obama — who tries to kill our energy jobs, whether they are coal, natural gas, wind or water." Tennant was endorsed by Senator Rockefeller, Senator Joe Manchin, and Governor Earl Ray Tomblin. She was also endorsed by First Lady Michelle Obama, North Dakota Senator Heidi Heitkamp, and Massachusetts Senator Elizabeth Warren, who hosted a fundraiser for Tennant.

According to Politico and The New York Times, Tennant sought to distance herself from President Obama. Tennant was an Obama delegate at the 2012 Democratic National Convention.

== Personal life ==
Prior to Tennant's election as secretary of state, she was co-owner of Wells Media Group, a Charleston-based video production and media training company she operated with her husband, Democratic state senator Erik Wells. Tennant and Wells have one daughter, Delaney, and reside in Charleston.

In 2017, Tennant joined the Brennan Center for Justice at the New York University School of Law in a voting rights advocacy position.

== Electoral history ==
West Virginia Secretary of State Democratic primary election, 2004
Party	Candidate	Votes	%
Democratic	Ken Hechler	67,065	25.74
Democratic	Natalie Tennant	65,947	25.31
Democratic	Mike Oliverio	52,720	20.23
Democratic	Roger Pritt	40,823	15.67
Democratic	Larrie Bailey	17,590	6.75
Democratic	Donna Acord	9,296	3.57
Democratic	George Daugherty	7,139	2.74

West Virginia Secretary of State Democratic primary election, 2008
Party	Candidate	Votes	%
Democratic	Natalie Tennant	172,458	51.38
Democratic	Joe DeLong	120,264	35.83
Democratic	Billy Wayne Bailey, Jr.	42,902	12.78

West Virginia Secretary of State Election, 2008
Party	Candidate	Votes	%
Democratic	Natalie Tennant	437,430	65.51
Republican	Charles Theophilus Minimah	230,283	34.49

West Virginia Governor Special Democratic primary election, 2011
Party	Candidate	Votes	%
Democratic	Earl Ray Tomblin	51,348	40.40
Democratic	Rick Thompson	30,631	24.10
Democratic	Natalie Tennant	22,106	17.39
Democratic	John Perdue	15,995	12.58
Democratic	Jeffrey Kessler	6,550	5.15
Democratic	Arne Moltis	481	0.38

West Virginia Secretary of State Election, 2012
Party	Candidate	Votes	%
Democratic	Natalie Tennant (inc.)	398,463	62.40
Republican	Brian Savilla	240,080	37.60

West Virginia U.S. Senate Democratic primary election, 2014
Party	Candidate	Votes	%
Democratic	Natalie Tennant	104,598	77.95
Democratic	Dennis Melton	15,817	11.79
Democratic	David Wamsley	13,773	10.26

West Virginia U.S. Senate Election, 2014
Party	Candidate	Votes	%
Republican	Shelley Moore Capito	281,820	62.12
Democratic	Natalie Tennant	156,360	34.47
Libertarian	John Buckley	7,409	1.63
Mountain	Bob Henry Baber	5,504	1.21
Constitution	Phil Hudok	2,566	0.57

West Virginia Secretary of State Democratic primary election, 2016
Party	Candidate	Votes	%
Democratic	Natalie Tennant (inc.)	192,176	77.18
Democratic	Patsy Trecost	56,832	22.82

West Virginia Secretary of State election, 2016
Party	Candidate	Votes	%
Republican	Mac Warner	335,526	48.52
Democratic	Natalie Tennant (inc.)	323,750	46.82

Political offices
Preceded by Betty Ireland	Secretary of State of West Virginia; 2009–2017	Succeeded by Mac Warner
Party political offices
Preceded by Ken Hechler	Democratic nominee for Secretary of State of West Virginia; 2008, 2012, 2016, 2020	Succeeded by Thornton Cooper
Preceded by Jay Rockefeller	Democratic nominee for U.S. Senator from West Virginia (Class 2); 2014	Succeeded by Paula Jean Swearengin
