= Stephen T. Williams =

American politician

Steve Williams
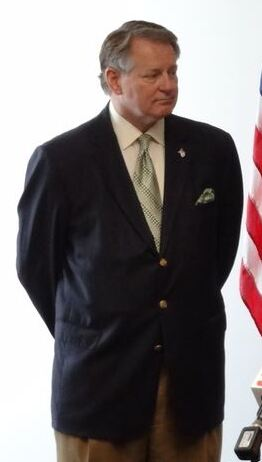

Member of the West Virginia House of Delegates
- Incumbent
- Assumed office December 1, 2026
- Preceded by: Patrick Lucas
- In office December 1, 1986 – December 1, 1994
- Succeeded by: Evan Jenkins
- Constituency: 13th district (1986–1992); 16th district (1992–1994); 24th district (2026– )

47th Mayor of Huntington
- In office January 1, 2013 – January 1, 2025
- Preceded by: Kim Wolfe
- Succeeded by: Patrick Farrell

Personal details
- Born: Stephen Taylor Williams; 1955 or 1956 (age 70–71)
- Party: Democratic
- Education: Marshall University (BA); West Virginia University (MPA)
- Website: Official website Campaign website

Stephen Taylor Williams (born 1955/1956) is an American politician who served as the 47th mayor of Huntington, West Virginia from 2013 to 2025. Williams previously served as Huntington's city manager, a member of the West Virginia House of Delegates, and a member of the Huntington City Council. On September 4, 2023, he became the first Democrat to declare candidacy for governor of West Virginia in the 2024 West Virginia gubernatorial election and subsequently won the nomination but lost the general election to Republican Patrick Morrisey.

== Education ==
Williams attended Huntington High School, graduating in 1974. He received a Bachelor of Arts in political science from Marshall University in 1978 and a Master of Public Administration degree from West Virginia University in 1980.

Williams played four years of football at Marshall, during the Young Thundering Herd era, after the Marshall Plane Crash.

== Political career ==
Williams served as director of economic development for Huntington in 1984 and worked as city manager from 1984 to 1985. From 1987 to 1994, he was a member of the West Virginia House of Delegates for Cabell County and Wayne County. He previously ran for mayor in 1993, defeating incumbent mayor Bobby Nelson in the Democratic primary, but lost to his Republican opponent, Councilwoman Jean Dean.

Williams returned to politics in 2008 when he won election as an at-large member of the Huntington City Council, where he served until his election as mayor in 2012. On June 19, 2017, Williams announced that he would stand in the 2018 race for West Virginia's 3rd congressional district, which was an open seat after the incumbent congressman, Evan Jenkins, declared to run against Joe Manchin for the Senate. On January 19, 2018, Williams dropped out of the race.

=== Mayor of Huntington ===
Williams's campaign against his predecessor, Kim Wolfe, in the 2012 mayoral election marked the first time a sitting city official challenged an incumbent mayor since Huntington switched to a strong mayor form of government in 1985.

In March 2013, Williams signed an ordinance passed by the Huntington City Council which rescinded a 1% occupation tax which had been the subject of a lawsuit filed in 2011 against the city. The tax had been imposed under a West Virginia initiative which granted several cities, including Huntington, increased home rule, including increased powers to change their tax structures.

During the spring and summer of 2013, Williams's administration organized a citywide cleanup effort and planned increased enforcement of local ordinances like those that prohibited tall grass and the storage of furniture and construction materials in yards or on porches. The city planned to hire additional code enforcement officers, reinstate the Fire Department's Fire Prevention Bureau and seek the ability to issue citations on-the-spot, rather than after a ten-day warning period, from the West Virginia State Legislature. The mayor directed the city government to design and implement a system to ensure all new graffiti in the city is removed within 24 hours.

Williams has supported the continued redevelopment of the Central City Market in Huntington's West End, drawing inspiration from the management of the Capitol Market in Charleston.

In 2017 under Williams' direction, the City of Huntington sued eight pharmaceutical companies, claiming their products harmed Huntington's welfare, leading to a drug crisis in the city and surrounding county. Included in the lawsuits are companies like McKesson Corp., Cardinal Health and AmerisourceBergen Drug Corp, among others. A year later in 2018, Williams was elected as a board member to the National League of Cities.

=== Governor of West Virginia candidacy ===
In 2024, Williams lost the 2024 West Virginia gubernatorial election to the Republican candidate Patrick Morrisey.

=== West Virgina House of Delegates ===
In 2026, Williams defeated incumbent Republican Patrick Lucas for the West Virginia House of Delegates 24th district.

== Personal life ==
Williams is married to Mary Poindexter Williams and has two step-daughters. He serves as an officer of various organizations affiliated with Marshall University and attends Trinity Episcopal Church.

=== In popular culture ===
Williams has been featured on the television adaptation of the podcast My Brother, My Brother and Me. In the show, Williams is consulted by Justin McElroy, Travis McElroy, and Griffin McElroy regularly, including discussions of whether the three can be named honorary mayors or host a tarantula-themed parade in downtown Huntington.

== See also ==
- List of mayors of Huntington, West Virginia

Party political offices
Preceded by Ben Salango	Democratic nominee for Governor of West Virginia; 2024	Most recent
