= Cross-State Air Pollution Rule =

The Cross-State Air Pollution Rule (CSAPR) is a rule by the United States Environmental Protection Agency (EPA) that requires member states of the United States to reduce power plant emissions that contribute to ozone and/or fine particle pollution in other states. The EPA describes this rule as one that "protects the health of millions of Americans by helping states reduce air pollution and attain clean air standards."

== Details ==
The CSAPR requires 23 United States states to reduce their annual emissions of sulfur dioxide (SO_{2}) and nitrogen oxides (NO_{x}) to help downwind states attain the 24-hour National Ambient Air Quality Standards, and 25 states to reduce ozone season nitrogen oxide emissions to help downwind states attain the 8-hour NAAQS.

The states that are required to reduce sulfur dioxide emissions are divided into two groups, both of which must reduce their emissions in 2012. Group 1 is required to make additional emissions reductions by 2014.

== History ==
Date	Event
July 6, 2011	The EPA finalized the rule, replacing the EPA's earlier Clean Air Interstate Rule (CAIR) from 2005.
December 15, 2011	The EPA finalized a supplemental rulemaking to require five states - Iowa, Michigan, Missouri, Oklahoma, and Wisconsin - to make summertime NO_{x} reductions under the CSAPR ozone season control program.
February 7, 2012	The EPA issued a minor adjustment to the rule.
June 5, 2012	The EPA issued another minor adjustment to the rule.
August 21, 2012	A D.C. Circuit Court of Appeals overturned the CSAPR.
April 29, 2014	The United States Supreme Court reversed the decision of the D. C. Circuit Court of Appeals.
June 26, 2014	The United States federal government files its motion with the D. C. Circuit Court of Appeals to lift its stay. Until the motion is decided, the earlier law (CAIR) remains in effect.
October 23, 2014	The U.S. Court of Appeals for the D.C. Circuit ordered that EPA's motion to lift the stay of the Cross-State Air Pollution Rule be granted.
January 1, 2015	CSAPR Phase 1 implementation began.

== Reception ==
The CSAPR has been defended by environmental groups such as the Environmental Defense Fund, progressive think tanks such as ThinkProgress, and publications such as the Huffington Post.
