= 2020 West Virginia Secretary of State election =

- November 3, 2020
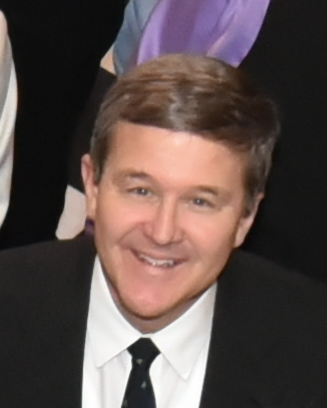

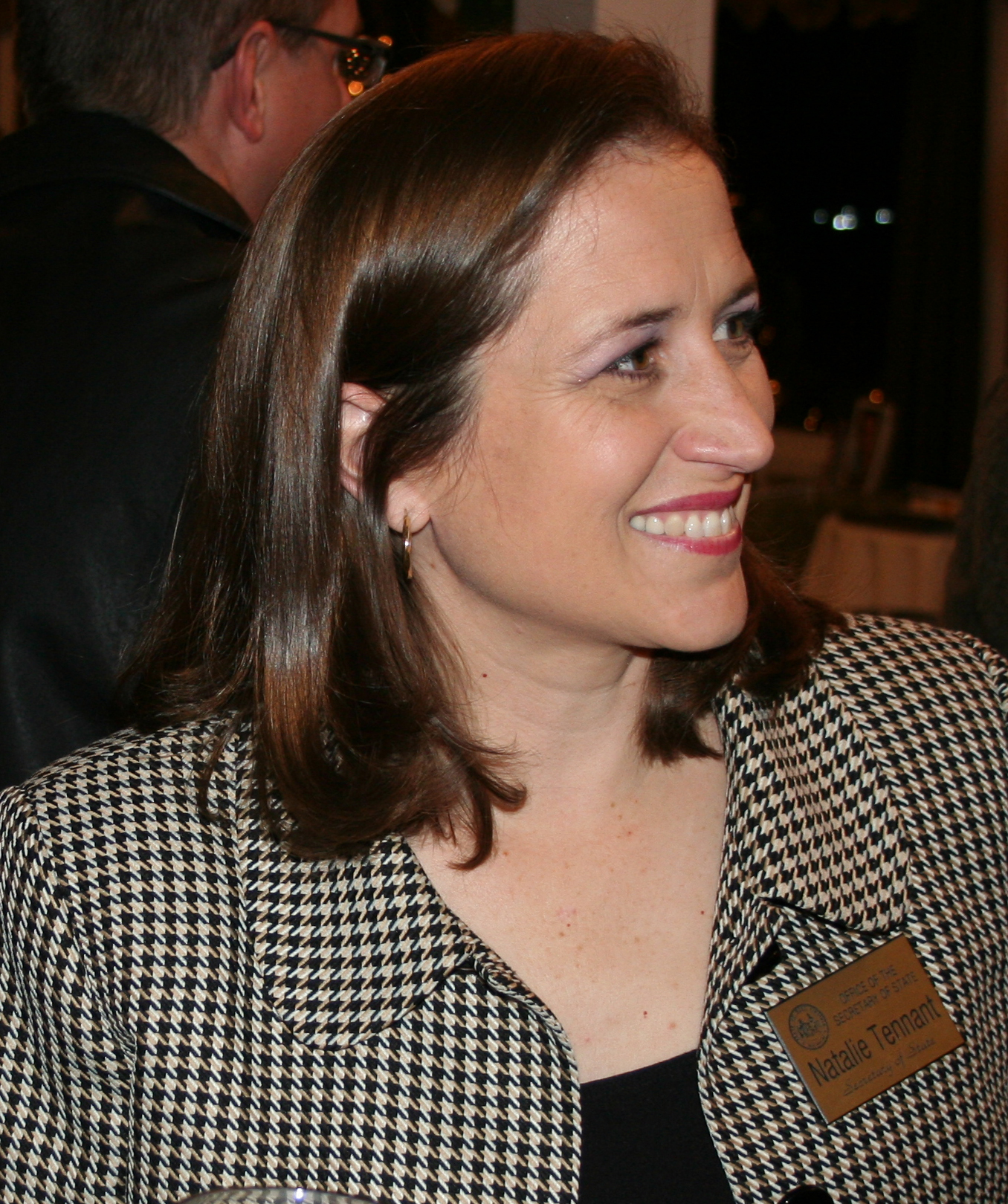
Nominee	Mac Warner	Natalie Tennant
Party	Republican	Democratic
Popular vote	447,537	320,650
Percentage	58.26%	41.74%
- Warner: 50–60% 60–70% 70–80% 80–90% >90% Tennant: 50–60% 60–70% 70–80% 80–90% >90% Tie: 50%
Secretary of State before election
Mac Warner
Republican
Elected Secretary of State
Mac Warner
Republican

The 2020 West Virginia Secretary of State election was held on November 3, 2020, to elect the secretary of state of West Virginia. It was held concurrently with the 2020 U.S. presidential election, along with elections to the United States Senate and United States House of Representatives, as well as various state and local elections. Incumbent Republican Secretary of State Mac Warner won re-election to a second term by a much larger margin than expected.

== Republican primary ==
=== Candidates ===
==== Nominee ====
- Mac Warner, incumbent secretary of state

===== Withdrawn =====
- Tyrin Smith-Holmes

==== Results ====
Republican primary results
Party	Candidate	Votes	%
Republican	Mac Warner (incumbent)	176,915	100.0%
Total votes		176,915	100.0%

== Democratic primary ==
=== Candidates ===
==== Nominee ====
- Natalie Tennant, former secretary of state (2009–2017)

==== Results ====
Democratic primary results
Party	Candidate	Votes	%
Democratic	Natalie Tennant	175,600	100.0%
Total votes		175,600	100.0%

== General election ==
This race was viewed as competitive, as Natalie Tennant was considered to be a strong candidate.

=== Debates ===
2022 West Virginia secretary of state debate
No.	Date	Host	Moderator	Link	Republican	Democratic
Key: P Participant A Absent N Not invited I Invited W Withdrawn						
Key: P Participant A Absent N Not invited I Invited W Withdrawn					Mac Warner	Natalie Tennant
1	Sep. 17, 2020	West Virginia; Public Broadcasting	Dave Mistich		P	P

=== Polling ===
Poll source	Date(s) administered	Sample size (Note: Key: A – all adults RV – registered voters LV – likely voters V – unclear)	Margin of error	Mac Warner (R)	Natalie Tennant (D)	Undecided
Triton Polling and Research/WMOV	October 19–21, 2020	544 (LV)	± 4.2%	51%	45%	5%
Triton Polling & Research/WMOV	September 29–30, 2020 (Note: Additional data sourced from FiveThirtyEight)	525 (RV)	± 4.3%	50%	43%	7%

=== Predictions ===
Source	Ranking	As of
The Cook Political Report	Likely R	June 25, 2020

=== Results ===
2020 West Virginia Secretary of State election
Party	Candidate	Votes	%
Republican	Mac Warner (incumbent)	447,537	58.26%
Democratic	Natalie Tennant	320,650	41.74%
Total votes		768,187	100.0%
Republican hold			

==== By county ====
County	Mac Warner Republican		Natalie Tennant Democratic	
County	#	%	#	%
Barbour	4,061	62.40%	2,447	37.60%
Berkeley	31,519	62.77%	18,693	37.23%
Boone	4,820	54.99%	3,945	45.01%
Braxton	2,934	53.81%	2,519	46.19%
Brooke	5,648	55.42%	4,543	44.58%
Cabell	18,396	50.93%	17,726	49.07%
Calhoun	1,662	58.83%	1,163	41.17%
Clay	1,896	58.28%	1,357	41.72%
Doddridge	2,171	72.68%	816	27.32%
Fayette	8,728	53.53%	7,576	46.47%
Gilmer	1,403	54.83%	1,156	45.17%
Grant	4,244	83.64%	830	16.36%
Greenbrier	9,289	59.96%	6,204	40.04%
Hampshire	7,168	74.49%	2,455	25.51%
Hancock	7,967	60.26%	5,253	39.74%
Hardy	4,241	69.35%	1,874	30.65%
Harrison	16,389	55.14%	13,334	44.86%
Jackson	7,907	60.18%	5,233	39.82%
Jefferson	15,290	53.07%	12,635	46.93%
Kanawha	38,989	48.46%	41,463	51.54%
Lewis	4,470	61.03%	2,854	38.97%
Lincoln	4,484	60.41%	2,939	39.59%
Logan	7,586	63.96%	4,275	36.04%
Marion	12,152	47.90%	13,218	52.10%
Marshall	7,807	57.32%	5,813	42.68%
Mason	6,342	58.41%	4,516	41.59%
McDowell	3,792	64.34%	2,102	35.66%
Mercer	16,632	68.23%	7,746	31.77%
Mineral	9,285	74.39%	3,197	25.61%
Mingo	6,219	67.47%	2,998	32.53%
Monongalia	18,458	44.96%	22,598	55.04%
Monroe	4,281	68.69%	1,951	31.31%
Morgan	6,113	73.33%	2,223	26.67%
Nicholas	6,470	63.26%	3,757	36.74%
Ohio	9,759	50.33%	9,632	49.67%
Pendleton	2,325	66.70%	1,161	33.30%
Pleasants	2,087	62.39%	1,258	37.61%
Pocahontas	2,391	63.10%	1,398	36.90%
Preston	9,512	67.67%	4,545	32.33%
Putnam	16,900	60.68%	10,950	39.32%
Raleigh	20,171	63.04%	11,824	36.96%
Randolph	6,384	53.92%	5,456	46.08%
Ritchie	2,938	71.92%	1,147	28.08%
Roane	3,172	56.72%	2,420	43.28%
Summers	3,119	58.94%	2,173	41.06%
Taylor	4,330	59.96%	2,892	40.04%
Tucker	2,231	60.46%	1,459	39.54%
Tyler	2,588	68.72%	1,178	31.28%
Upshur	6,400	64.52%	3,520	35.48%
Wayne	9,667	60.96%	6,190	39.04%
Webster	1,849	57.85%	1,347	42.15%
Wetzel	3,502	54.99%	2,867	45.01%
Wirt	1,651	64.32%	916	35.68%
Wood	23,121	61.53%	14,456	38.47%
Wyoming	5,627	69.65%	2,452	30.35%
Totals	477,537	58.26%	320,650	41.74%

Counties that flipped from Democratic to Republican

- Wetzel (largest city: New Martinsville)
- Ohio (largest city: Wheeling)
- Marshall (largest city: Moundsville)
- Brooke (largest borough: Wellsburg)
- Pocahontas (largest city: Marlinton)
- Randolph (largest city: Elkins)
- Greenbrier (largest city: Lewisburg)
- Webster (largest town: Webster Springs)
- Gilmer (largest city: Glenville)
- Calhoun (largest city: Grantsville)
- Braxton (largest town: Sutton)
- Roane (largest city: Spencer)
- Mason (largest city: Point Pleasant)
- Fayette (largest city: Fayetteville)
- Summers (largest city: Hinton)
- Boone (largest city: Madison)
- Cabell (largest city: Huntington)
- Lincoln (largest city: Hamlin)
- Wayne (largest city: Kenova)
- Wyoming (largest city: Mullens)
- Logan (largest borough: Logan)
- Mingo (largest borough: Williamson)
- McDowell (largest city: Welch)

==== By congressional district ====
Warner won all three congressional districts.

District	Warner	Tennant	Representative
1st	57%	43%	David McKinley
2nd	57%	43%	Alex Mooney
3rd	61%	39%	Carol Miller

== Notes ==
Partisan clients
