= Patsy Trecost =

American politician

Member of the West Virginia House of Delegates
- In office 2014–2016
- Constituency: District 48

Personal details
- Party: Democratic

Patsy Samuel Trecost II is an American politician from West Virginia. He represented District 48 in the West Virginia House of Delegates from 2014 to 2016.
