= S. Marshall Wilson =

American politician

Member of the West Virginia House of Delegates from the 60th district
- In office December 1, 2016 – December 1, 2020
- Preceded by: Larry W. Faircloth Sr.
- Succeeded by: Don Forsht

Personal details
- Born: July 8, 1969 (age 57) South Carolina, U.S.
- Party: Constitution
- Other political affiliations: Americans Coming Together (ACT) (2022–2023); Independent (2019–2022); Republican (until 2019)

Stephen Marshall Wilson is an American politician who served in the West Virginia House of Delegates from the 60th district from 2016 to 2020. Wilson is a staunch advocate for Constitutional Rights, transparency and accountability in government. As of 2026, Wilson is running as the Constitution Party candidate for US Senate.

== Early life & Military ==
Stephen Marshall Wilson was born July 8, 1969, in South Carolina. He earned his B.A. at Louisiana State University, a diploma at U.S. Army Command and General Staff College, and an Executive Masters of Arts in National Security Affairs at The Institute of World Politics. A combat veteran, Wilson retired as a Major with over 20 years of combined enlisted and commissioned service in the Louisiana Army National Guard, the US Army, and the Maryland National Guard. During his military service, Wilson was awarded the Army Commendation (x2), Meritorious Service Medal, and Bronze Star Medal, among others. He and his wife have nine adult children.

== Legislature ==
In the 2016 general election, Wilson defeated Democratic candidate Gary "Peanut" Collins with 4,874 votes to Collins' 2,963. In the 2018 Republican primary, Wilson defeated Larry W. Faircloth Sr., a former state legislator and son of Larry V. Faircloth. Wilson was subsequently unopposed in the general election.

During his time as a delegate in the WV House of Delegates, Wilson served on the Liberty Caucus and sponsored over 224 bills and lead-sponsored 39 bills. On December 17, 2019, Wilson announced his change in party affiliation from Republican to Independent. In 2023, Wilson joined the Constitution Party of WV and agreed to be its nominee for Governor of West Virginia in the 2024 election.

== Post-legislative career ==
Wilson unsuccessfully was able to obtain ballot access as an independent candidate during COVID-19 and ran in the 2020 West Virginia Governor election as an independent write-in candidate, receiving 1.93% of the vote. In the 2022 general election, as the nominee of Americans Coming Together (ACT), Wilson won 39% of the vote in a two-way race for House of Delegates District 91, the highest for a minor party nominee in West Virginia in at least 95 years. In 2024, Wilson was successful in obtaining over the required 8,000+ signatures for entry on the general election ballot as the Constitution Party candidate for WV Governor. Wilson obtained over 2% of the vote and which allowed for ballot access (and party recognition) for the Constitution Party. He taught an American Government Course at Blue Ridge Community and Technical College in Berkeley County, West Virginia.
