= Mac Warner =

American politician (born 1955)

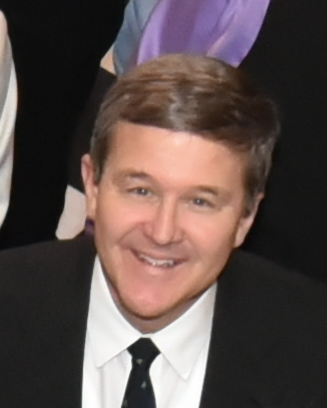
- Warner in 2018

United States Assistant Attorney General for the Civil Rights Division
- Acting
- In office January 20, 2025 – April 7, 2025
- President: Donald Trump
- Preceded by: Kristen Clarke
- Succeeded by: Harmeet Dhillon

30th Secretary of State of West Virginia
- In office January 16, 2017 – January 13, 2025
- Governor: Jim Justice
- Preceded by: Natalie Tennant
- Succeeded by: Kris Warner

Personal details
- Born: Andrew McCoy Warner; February 18, 1955 (age 71) Charleston, West Virginia, U.S.
- Party: Republican
- Spouse: Debbie Law
- Children: 4
- Relatives: Kasey Warner (brother); Kris Warner (brother)
- Education: United States Military Academy (BS); West Virginia University (JD); University of Virginia (LLM)

Andrew McCoy "Mac" Warner (born February 18, 1955) is an American attorney and veteran who previously served as acting United States assistant attorney general for the Civil Rights Division. Warner also previously served as the West Virginia secretary of state from 2017 to 2025. He announced his candidacy for Governor of West Virginia in 2024 on January 10, 2023.

== Early life and education ==
Warner graduated from United States Military Academy at West Point and later with a J.D. from West Virginia University School of Law and LL.M. from JAG School and University of Virginia School of Law in International Law.

== Career ==
Warner served in the United States Army in the U.S. Army JAG Corps. He retired from military service and became a United States Department of State contractor.

Warner was elected West Virginia secretary of state in 2016 and reorganized the office upon taking control of it, resulting in the firing of 16 staffers. All employees of the secretary of state are hired at the "will and pleasure" of the elected officeholder and have no civil service status. The Warner layoffs included staff members who had served multiple administrations—Republican and Democratic. In January 2018, the secretary of state's office announced that it had processed 45,000 new voter registrations in 2017, including 13,995 high school students, while over 86,000 registrations were cancelled due to deaths, out-of-date information, duplication, or felony status.

Warner and Attorney General of West Virginia Patrick Morrisey sided with the Ohio secretary of state in a 2018 U.S. Supreme Court case regarding a state's right to purge voter registration rolls. The court ruled 5-4 in Ohio's favor.

After Donald Trump lost the 2020 election and made false claims of fraud, Warner defended Trump's false claims and participated in "Stop the Steal" protests.

Warner opposes the For the People Act, which would expand voting rights. He opposes automatic voter registration, mail-in voting, and same-day voter registration.

In January 2025, Warner was appointed as acting United States assistant attorney general for the Civil Rights Division.

== Personal life ==
He lives in Morgantown, West Virginia. He is brothers with Kasey Warner, former United States attorney for the Southern District of West Virginia and fellow former J.A.G. Corps officer. His other brothers are Kris Warner, former chairman of the West Virginia Republican Party and his successor as Secretary of State, and Monty Warner, the 2004 Republican nominee for Governor of West Virginia. He is the father of four children, who are all current or former Army officers. He is married to Debbie Warner, a member of the West Virginia House of Delegates for district 82.

Party political offices
| Preceded by Brian Savilla | Republican nominee for Secretary of State of West Virginia; 2016, 2020 | Succeeded by Kris Warner |
Political offices
| Preceded by Natalie Tennant | Secretary of State of West Virginia; 2017–2025 | Succeeded by Kris Warner |
