= West Virginia Republican Party =

West Virginia affiliate of the Republican Party

- Chairperson: Josh Holstein
- Governor: Patrick Morrisey
- Senate President: Randy Smith
- Speaker: Roger Hanshaw
- Headquarters: Charleston, WV
- Membership (2025): ▲500,858
- Ideology: Conservatism
- National affiliation: Republican Party
- Colors: Red
- Seats in the U.S. Senate: 2 / 2
- Seats in the U.S. House: 2 / 2
- Statewide executive offices: 6 / 6
- Seats in the West Virginia Senate: 32 / 34
- Seats in the West Virginia House of Delegates: 91 / 100

Election symbol

Website
- www.wvgop.org

The West Virginia Republican Party is the affiliate of the United States Republican Party in West Virginia. Josh Holstein is the party chair. It is currently the dominant party in the state, and is one of the strongest affiliates of the national Republican Party. It controls both of West Virginia's U.S. House seats, both of the U.S. Senate seats, all six statewide executive offices, and has supermajorities in both houses of the state legislature.

== History ==
=== Part of Virginia ===
John Curtiss Underwood formed the party's newspaper in Wheeling, the first in any of the border states using financial aid from William H. Seward. Underwood also received financial backing to form a colony for northern workers in Ceredo.

Republicans, such as Cassius Marcellus Clay and Underwood, viewed John Brown's raid on Harpers Ferry as damaging to the party. Almost all of Abraham Lincoln's support in the 1860 election came from around Wheeling.

=== Later ===
West Virginia sent delegates to the 1866 National Union Convention where Governor Arthur I. Boreman argued against supporting black suffrage as "we did not come here to commit suicide" and that passing the resolution would have them "damned to all eternity".

The Civil War helped the Republican Party gain recognition in the state. The Civil War in West Virginia often split families apart. The Boggs family lived in Pendleton County and one son was the head of the Confederate County Court while another son was the head of the Union Home guards in the north. Today, the northern party of Pendleton County is still strongly Republican. Republicans in Hampshire and Hardy counties left after the war to form Mineral and Grant counties, which are still primarily Republican. Republicans held the control in the state until the 1870s and the Confederates began voting and holding offices. In the 1870s, the party was so weak that it endorsed a Democratic governor.

Major Nathan Goff Jr. a veteran of the Civil War restructured the party. He was able to get the party to raise money and voters and recruit leaders. He led the party until the 1880s. He ran for governor in 1888 and was defeated by Aretas B. Fleming despite having more votes. The Republicans were the dominant party until the Great Depression. From the Great Depression until 2014, Democrats controlled the state.

Arch Moore Jr. was elected the Republican governor in the 1960s. In 1985, Moore helped raise money and supervised recovery efforts for the flood of 1985. The state voted for Bush in 2000 and 2004. Betty Ireland was also elected as Secretary of State in 2004.

In the 2014 elections, the West Virginia Republican Party made major gains in West Virginia, capturing one of its two Senate seats, all of its congressional House seats for the first time since 1921, and gained control of both the West Virginia House of Delegates and the West Virginia Senate for the first time in 80 years. In the 2016 elections, the Republicans held on to their seats and made gains in the State Senate and gained three statewide offices.

In March 2019, the West Virginia GOP was embroiled in national controversy when a poster linking Democratic Rep. Ilhan Omar, a Muslim member of Congress, to the 9/11 attacks was displayed at the state capitol.

The party used an open primary from 1986 to 2025.

== Current elected officials ==
The West Virginia Republican Party hold both of the state's two U.S. House seats.

As of January 3, 2025:

=== Members of Congress ===
==== U.S. Senate ====
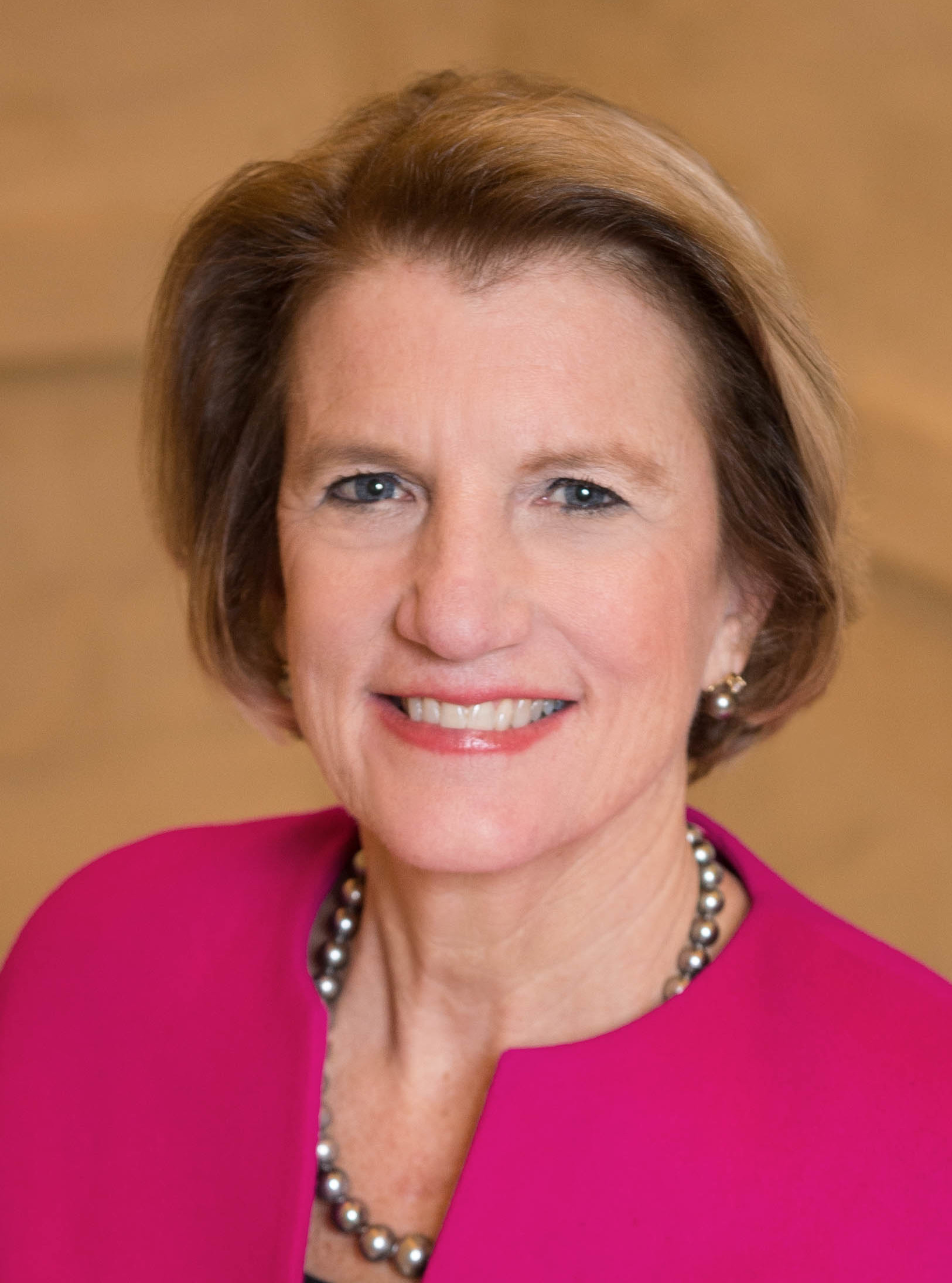
Senior U.S. Senator Shelley Moore Capito

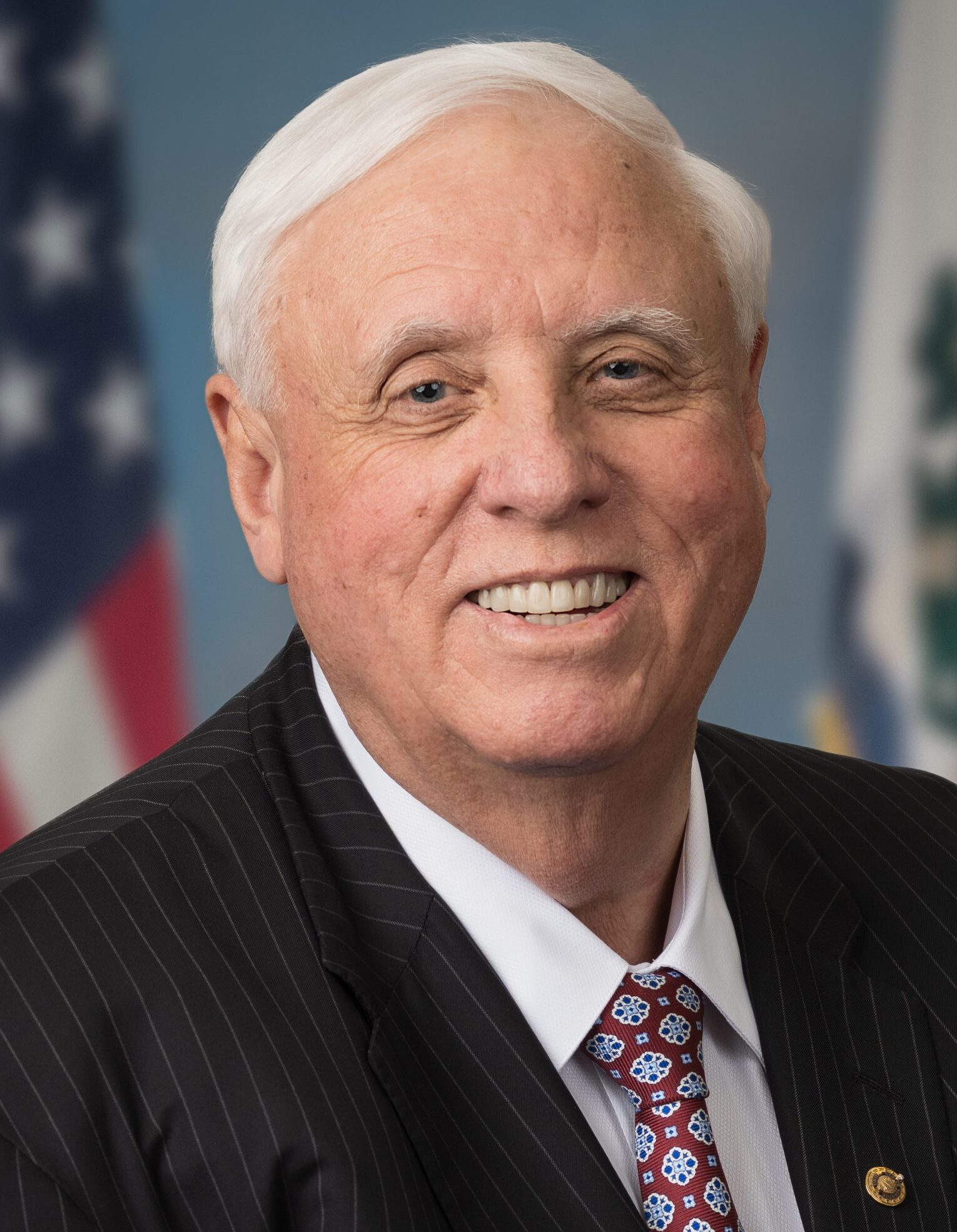
Junior U.S. Senator Jim Justice

==== U.S. House of Representatives ====
District	Member	Photo
1st	Carol Miller	
2nd	Riley Moore	

=== Statewide office (State Board of Public Works) ===
- Governor: Patrick Morrisey
- President of the Senate/Lt. Governor: Randy Smith
- Attorney General: JB McCuskey
- State Treasurer: Larry Pack
- Auditor: Mark Hunt
- Secretary of State: Kris Warner
- Agriculture Commissioner: Kent Leonhardt

=== State legislative leadership ===
==== Senate ====
- President: Randy Smith
- President pro tempore: Donna Boley
- Majority Leader: Patrick S. Martin
- Majority Whip: Ryan Weld

==== House of Delegates ====
- Speaker of the House: Roger Hanshaw
- Speaker pro tempore: Matthew Rohrbach
- Majority Leader: Pat McGeehan
- Majority Whip: Marty Gearheart

== Recent electoral history ==
=== Gubernatorial ===
West Virginia Republican Party gubernatorial election results
Election	Gubernatorial candidate	Votes	Vote %	Result
1996	Cecil Underwood	324,518	51.63%	Won ✓
2000	Cecil Underwood	305,926	47.21%	Lost ✗
2004	Monty Warner	253,131	34.00%	Lost ✗
2008	Russ Weeks	181,612	25.73%	Lost ✗
2011	Bill Maloney	141,656	47.05%	Lost ✗
2012	Bill Maloney	303,291	45.65%	Lost ✗
2016	Bill Cole	301,987	42.30%	Lost ✗
2020	Jim Justice	497,944	63.49%	Won ✓
2024	Patrick Morrisey	459,300	61.99%	Won ✓

=== Legislative ===
Legislative Elections
House of Delegates			Governor	Senate		
Year	Seats	Change	Governor	Change	Seats	Year
2000	25 / 100	Steady	Bob Wise (D)	▲1	6 / 34	2000
2002	32 / 100	▲7	Bob Wise (D)	▲4	10 / 34	2002
2004	32 / 100	Steady	Joe Manchin (D)	▲3	13 / 34	2004
2006	28 / 100	▼4	Joe Manchin (D)	▼2	11 / 34	2006
2008	29 / 100	▲1	Joe Manchin (D)	▼3	8 / 34	2008
2010	35 / 100	▲6	Joe Manchin (D)	▼2	6 / 34	2010
2012	46 / 100	▲11	Earl Ray Tomblin (D)	▲3	9 / 34	2012
2014	64 / 100	▲18	Earl Ray Tomblin (D)	▲9	18 / 34	2014
2016	63 / 100	▼1	Jim Justice (D)	▲4	22 / 34	2016
2018	57 / 100	▼7	Jim Justice (R)	▼2	20 / 34	2018
2020	76 / 100	▲18	Jim Justice (R)	▲3	23 / 34	2020
2022	88 / 100	▲12	Jim Justice (R)	▲7	30 / 34	2022
2024	91 / 100	▲3	Patrick Morrisey (R)	▲2	32 / 34	2024

== Works cited ==
- Abbott, Richard (1986). The Republican Party and the South, 1855-1877: The First Southern Strategy. University of North Carolina Press. ISBN 0807816809.
