= 2016 West Virginia gubernatorial election =

- November 8, 2016
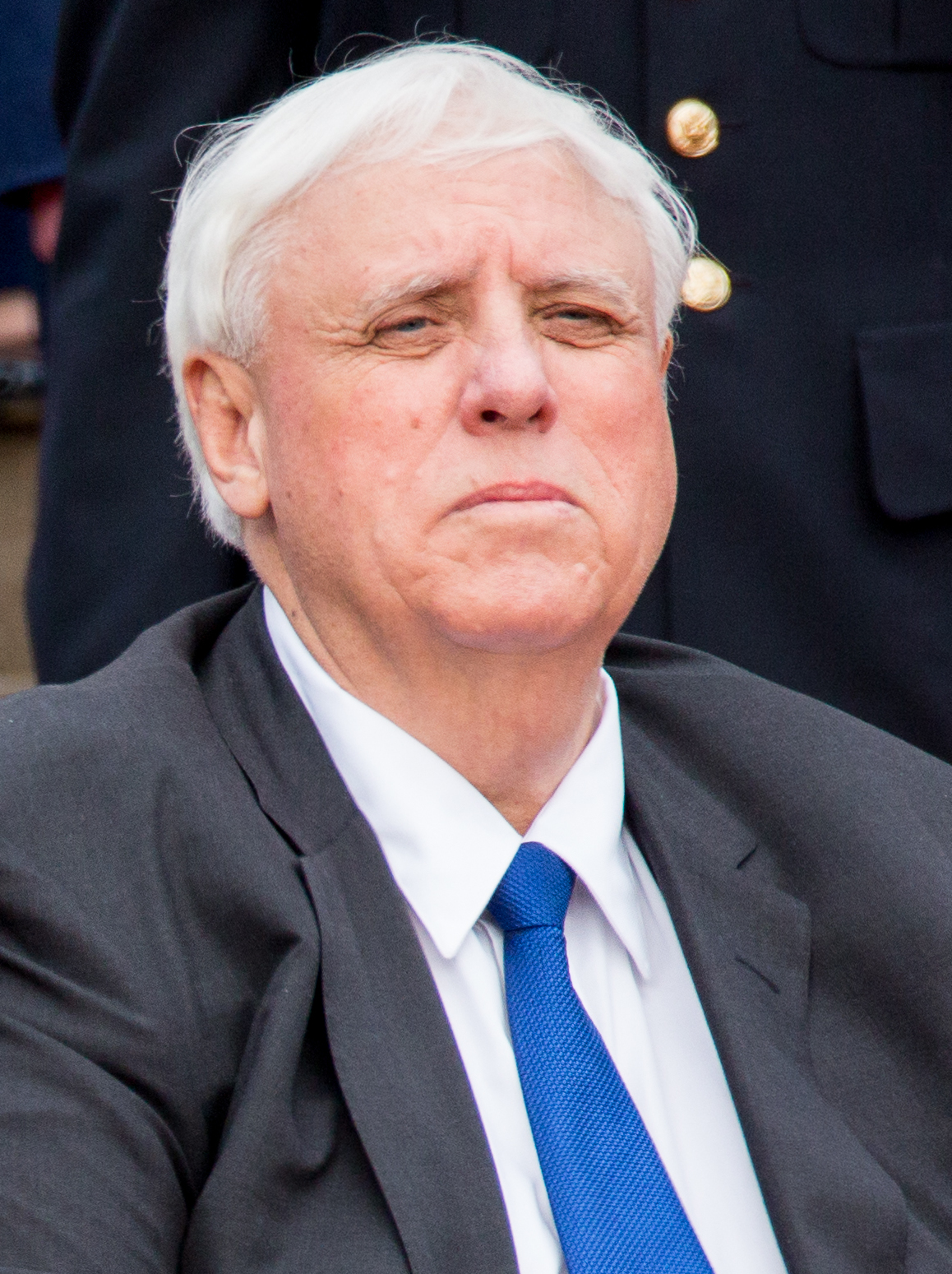

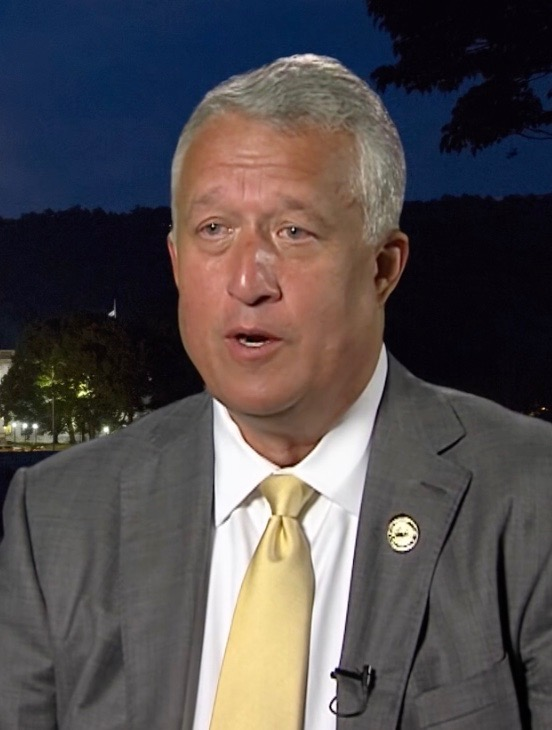

Nominee	Jim Justice	Bill Cole	Charlotte Pritt
Party	Democratic	Republican	Mountain
Popular vote	350,408	301,987	42,068
Percentage	49.09%	42.30%	5.89%
- Justice: 40–50% 50–60% 60–70% 70–80% 80–90% Cole: 40–50% 50–60% 60–70% 70–80% 80–90% Tie: 40–50%
Governor before election
Earl Ray Tomblin
Democratic
Elected Governor
Jim Justice
Democratic

The 2016 West Virginia gubernatorial election took place on November 8, 2016, to elect the governor of West Virginia, concurrently with the 2016 U.S. presidential election, as well as elections to the United States Senate in other states and elections to the United States House of Representatives, and various state and local elections. The primaries were held on May 10.

Incumbent Democratic governor Earl Ray Tomblin was barred from running for a second full term. He had ascended to the governorship upon Joe Manchin's resignation in 2010, won a 2011 special election to complete the term, and won a full term in 2012. Under the West Virginia Constitution, a partial term counts toward the limit of two consecutive terms.

Democratic nominee Jim Justice, a hotelier and coal baron, won the open seat with a plurality of the vote, defeating Republican state senator Bill Cole and former state senator Charlotte Pritt, who ran as a member of the Mountain Party. As of 2024, this is the last time a Democrat was elected governor of West Virginia, the last West Virginia gubernatorial race where the winner won less than 61% of votes, and the last West Virginia gubernatorial race where the winner did not win every county. Justice switched parties in August 2017 and was re-elected as a Republican in 2020, giving Republicans the governorship for the first time since 2001 and a trifecta in the state for the first time since 1931.

== Background ==
In November 2010, Democratic governor Joe Manchin resigned after being elected to the U.S. Senate. Earl Ray Tomblin, the president of the West Virginia Senate (with the honorary title of lieutenant governor), became acting governor, won an October 2011 special election to complete the term, and won a full term in the regularly scheduled 2012 election. Tomblin was ineligible to run for re-election in 2016, as the Constitution of West Virginia limits governors to two consecutive terms regardless of whether they are full or partial terms. However, governors are re-eligible after four years out of office.

After publicly speculating he would run for his former office, Manchin was considered a heavy favorite in the 2016 race, but he announced on April 19, 2015, that he would remain in the Senate instead.

== Democratic primary ==
2016 West Virginia gubernatorial election Democratic primary
- May 10, 2016
- Turnout: 258,350 votes
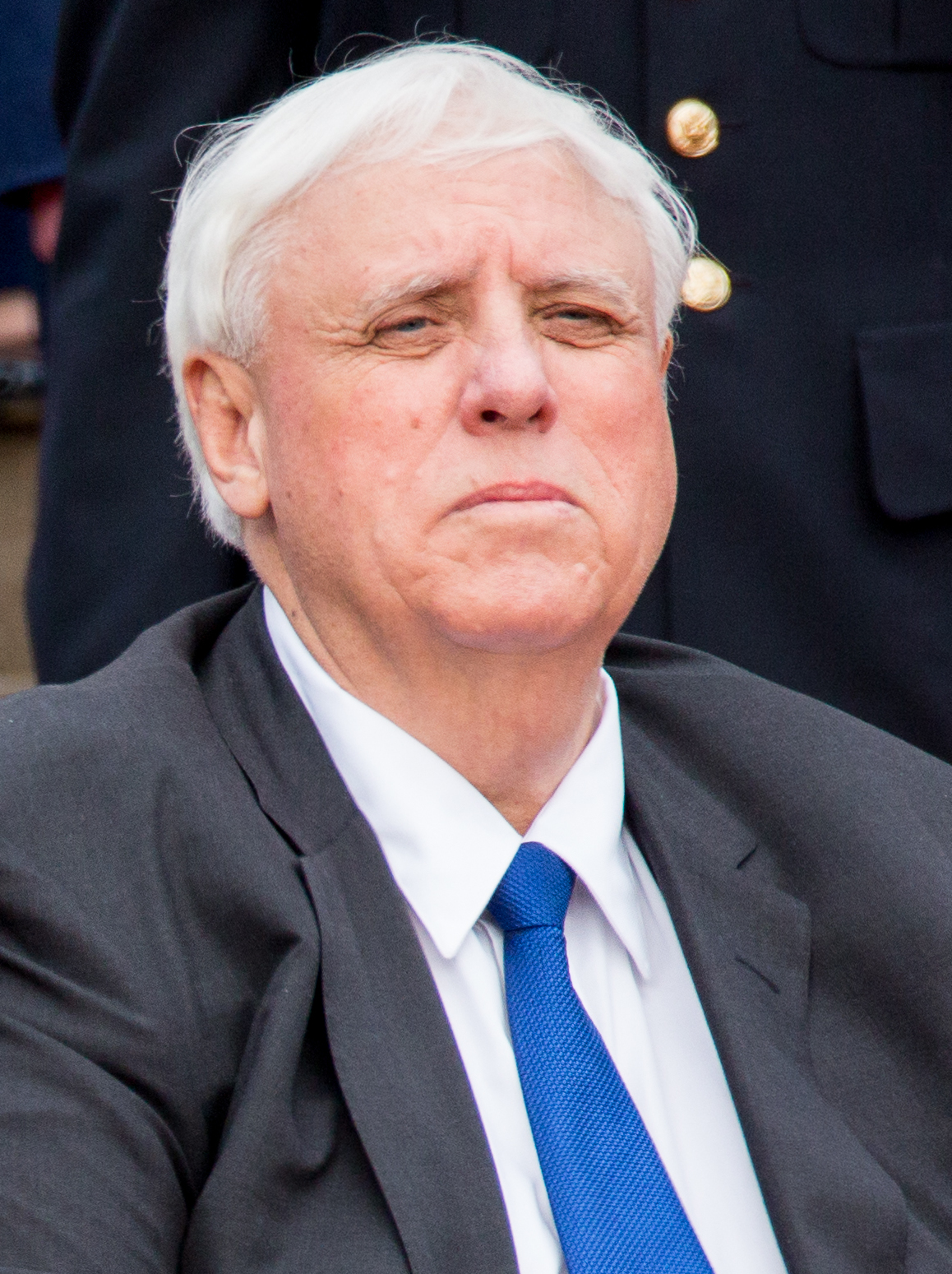

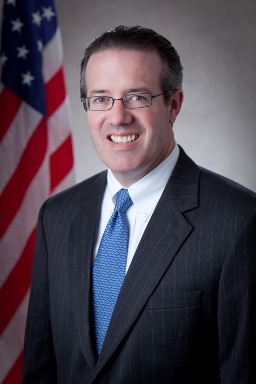

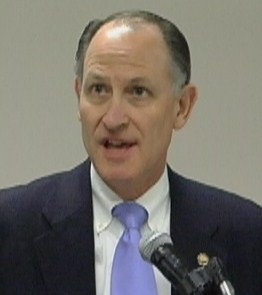
Candidate	Jim Justice	Booth Goodwin	Jeff Kessler
Popular vote	132,704	65,416	60,230
Percentage	51.39%	25.32%	23.31%
- Results by county. Blue indicates a win by Justice, green a win by Goodwin, and yellow a win by Kessler.

=== Candidates ===
==== Declared ====
- Booth Goodwin, former United States attorney for the Southern District of West Virginia
- Jim Justice, coal baron
- Jeff Kessler, minority leader of the West Virginia Senate, former president of the West Virginia Senate and candidate for governor in 2011

==== Declined ====
- Glen Gainer III, West Virginia state auditor and nominee for West Virginia's 1st congressional district in 2014
- Carte Goodwin, former U.S. senator
- Mike Green, former state senator
- Walt Helmick, West Virginia Commissioner of Agriculture
- Joe Manchin, U.S. senator and former governor
- John Perdue, West Virginia State Treasurer and candidate for governor in 2011
- Doug Reynolds, state delegate
- Doug Skaff, former state delegate
- Natalie Tennant, West Virginia Secretary of State, candidate for governor in 2011 and nominee for the U.S. Senate in 2014 (running for re-election)
- Rick Thompson, West Virginia Secretary of Veterans Assistance, former speaker of the West Virginia House of Delegates and candidate for governor in 2011

=== Polling ===
Poll source	Date(s) administered	Sample size	Margin of error	Jim Justice	Booth Goodwin	Jeff Kessler	Undecided
MetroNews	April 22–May 2, 2016	315	± 4.0%	32%	27%	23%	18%
Public Policy Polling	April 29–May 1, 2016	637	± 3.9%	37%	23%	19%	21%
West Virginia Veterans	March 2–6, 2016	600	± 3.9%	36%	20%	16%	28%
MetroNews	February 11–16, 2016	208	± 4.9%	32%	25%	23%	21%
Global Strategy Group^	December 1–3, 2015	350	± 5.2%	39%	13%	19%	21%

- ^ Indicates a poll taken for Jim Justice campaign.

=== Results ===
Democratic primary results
Party	Candidate	Votes	%
Democratic	Jim Justice	132,704	51.39%
Democratic	Booth Goodwin	65,416	25.32%
Democratic	Jeff Kessler	60,230	23.31%
Total votes		258,350	100.00%

== Republican primary ==
=== Candidates ===
==== Declared ====
- Bill Cole, president of the West Virginia Senate

==== Did not file ====
- Andrew Utterback, college student and candidate for mayor of Pineville in 2014
- Edwin Vanover, former Bramwell police chief and Democratic candidate for House of Delegates in 2012

==== Declined ====
- Evan Jenkins, U.S. representative
- David McKinley, U.S. representative and candidate for governor in 1996 (running for re-election)
- Patrick Morrisey, attorney general of West Virginia (running for re-election)
- Mary Lou Retton, Olympic gymnast
- Erikka Storch, state delegate

=== Endorsements ===
Bill Cole

Individuals

- Tim Armstead, speaker of the House of Delegates
- Shelley Moore Capito, U.S. senator
- Evan Jenkins, U.S. representative
- Danny Jones, Charleston mayor
- David McKinley, U.S. representative
- Alex Mooney, U.S. representative
- Patrick Morrisey, attorney general of West Virginia

Organizations

- National Federation of Independent Business
- National Right to Life
- West Virginia Coal Association

Newspapers

- Bluefield Daily Telegraph
- Charleston Gazette-Mail
- Daily Times
- The Intelligencer and Wheeling News Register
- The Inter-Mountain
- The Journal
- The Parkersburg News and Sentinel

=== Polling ===
Hypothetical polling

Poll source	Date(s) administered	Sample size	Margin of error	Bill Cole	David McKinley	Patrick Morrisey	Undecided
Harper Polling	April 9–11, 2015	242	± 6.3%	15%	31%	25%	29%

=== Results ===
Republican primary results
Party	Candidate	Votes	%
Republican	Bill Cole	161,127	100.00%
Total votes		161,127	100.00%

== Mountain Party ==
=== Candidates ===
==== Declared ====
- Charlotte Pritt, former Democratic state delegate, former Democratic state senator, write-in candidate for governor in 1992 and Democratic nominee for governor in 1996

==== Endorsements ====
Charlotte Pritt

Individuals

- Sue Thorn, former 2012 United States representative nominee from West Virginia's 1st congressional district and former member of the Democratic National Committee representing West Virginia.

Organizations

- West Virginia Sierra Club, environmental organization

== Libertarian Party ==
=== Candidates ===
==== Declared ====
- David Moran, retired engineer and farmer

== General election ==
=== Debates ===
- Complete video of debate, October 11, 2016 - C-SPAN

=== Predictions ===
Source	Ranking	As of
The Cook Political Report	Tossup	August 12, 2016
Daily Kos	Tossup	November 8, 2016
Rothenberg Political Report	Tilt D	November 3, 2016
Sabato's Crystal Ball	Lean D	November 7, 2016
Real Clear Politics	Lean R (flip)	November 1, 2016
Governing	Tossup	October 27, 2016

=== Polling ===
Poll source	Date(s) administered	Sample size	Margin of error	Jim Justice (D)	Bill Cole (R)	Charlotte Pritt (M)	David Moran (L)	Phil Hudok (C)	Undecided
SurveyMonkey	November 1–7, 2016	472	± 4.6%	36%	45%	13%	—	—	6%
SurveyMonkey	October 31–November 6, 2016	443	± 4.6%	37%	43%	13%	—	—	7%
SurveyMonkey	October 28–November 3, 2016	386	± 4.6%	40%	42%	12%	—	—	6%
SurveyMonkey	October 27–November 2, 2016	330	± 4.6%	39%	44%	10%	—	—	7%
SurveyMonkey	October 26–November 1, 2016	318	± 4.6%	42%	41%	12%	—	—	5%
SurveyMonkey	October 25–31, 2016	321	± 4.6%	42%	43%	13%	—	—	2%
MetroNews	October 12–17, 2016	408	± 4.9%	44%	33%	8%	5%	—	9%
Global Strategy Group	October 11–13, 2016	N/A	± 4.0%	44%	34%	8%	2%	—	12%
NMB Research	October 8–10, 2016	N/A	± 4.4%	39%	39%	5%	2%	1%	12%
Garin-Hart-Yang	September 13–17, 2016	500	± 5.0%	46%	33%	7%	4%	—	10%
Just Win Strategies→	September 8–10, 2016	600	± 4.0%	44%	42%	3%	2%	2%	7%
R.L. Repass & Partners/MetroNews	August 9–28, 2016	435	± 4.7%	46%	32%	8%	5%	—	9%
Global Strategy Group	August 1–3, 2016	419	± 4.8%	47%	37%	—	—	—	15%
Public Policy Polling	April 29–May 1, 2016	1,201	± 2.8%	41%	35%	—	—	—	24%
MetroNews	April 22–May 2, 2016	596	± 4.0%	52%	34%	—	—	—	14%
Orion Strategies	February 20–21, 2016	306	± 5.6%	37%	33%	—	—	—	30%
MetroNews	February 11–16, 2016	411	± 4.9%	49%	39%	—	—	—	12%
Orion Strategies	August 24–25, 2015	406	± 4.9%	34%	31%	—	—	—	35%

→ Indicates an internal poll conducted by the West Virginia Republican Party for Bill Cole.

Hypothetical polling

with Booth Goodwin

Poll source	Date(s) administered	Sample size	Margin of error	Booth Goodwin (D)	David McKinley (R)	Undecided
Harper Polling	April 9–11, 2015	702	± 3.7%	35%	40%	25%

Poll source	Date(s) administered	Sample size	Margin of error	Booth Goodwin (D)	Patrick Morrisey (R)	Undecided
Harper Polling	April 9–11, 2015	702	± 3.7%	36%	36%	28%

Poll source	Date(s) administered	Sample size	Margin of error	Booth Goodwin (D)	Bill Cole (R)	Other	Undecided
MetroNews	April 22–May 2, 2016	596	± 4.0%	47%	39%	—	14%
Public Policy Polling	April 29–May 1, 2016	1,201	± 2.8%	33%	39%	—	28%
Orion Strategies	February 20–21, 2016	306	± 5.6%	33%	36%	—	31%
MetroNews	February 11–16, 2016	411	± 4.9%	43%	44%	—	14%
Harper Polling	April 9–11, 2015	702	± 3.7%	35%	37%	—	27%

with Jeff Kessler

Poll source	Date(s) administered	Sample size	Margin of error	Jeff Kessler (D)	David McKinley (R)	Undecided
Harper Polling	April 9–11, 2015	702	± 3.7%	32%	42%	26%

Poll source	Date(s) administered	Sample size	Margin of error	Jeff Kessler (D)	Patrick Morrisey (R)	Undecided
Harper Polling	April 9–11, 2015	702	± 3.7%	35%	38%	27%

Poll source	Date(s) administered	Sample size	Margin of error	Jeff Kessler (D)	Bill Cole (R)	Other	Undecided
MetroNews	April 22–May 2, 2016	596	± 4.0%	45%	39%	—	16%
Public Policy Polling	April 29–May 1, 2016	1,201	± 2.8%	30%	40%	—	30%
Orion Strategies	February 20–21, 2016	306	± 5.6%	30%	40%	—	30%
MetroNews	February 11–16, 2016	411	± 4.9%	40%	45%	—	15%
Orion Strategies	August 24–25, 2015	406	± 4.9%	26%	37%	—	37%
Harper Polling	April 9–11, 2015	702	± 3.7%	34%	38%	—	28%

with Joe Manchin

Poll source	Date(s) administered	Sample size	Margin of error	Joe Manchin (D)	Bill Cole (R)	Undecided
Harper Polling	April 9–11, 2015	702	± 3.7%	54%	32%	14%

Poll source	Date(s) administered	Sample size	Margin of error	Joe Manchin (D)	David McKinley (R)	Undecided
Harper Polling	April 9–11, 2015	702	± 3.7%	52%	35%	12%

Poll source	Date(s) administered	Sample size	Margin of error	Joe Manchin (D)	Patrick Morrisey (R)	Undecided
Harper Polling	April 9–11, 2015	702	± 3.7%	58%	29%	13%
Global Strategy Group*	March 15–18, 2015	600	± 4.0%	60%	30%	10%

- * Internal poll for Joe Manchin

=== Results ===
West Virginia gubernatorial election, 2016
Party	Candidate	Votes	%	±%
Democratic	Jim Justice	350,408	49.09%	−1.40%
Republican	Bill Cole	301,987	42.30%	−3.35%
Mountain	Charlotte Pritt	42,068	5.89%	+3.36%
Libertarian	David Moran	15,354	2.15%	+0.81%
Constitution	Phil Hudok	4,041	0.57%	N/A
Total votes		713,858	100.00%	N/A
Democratic hold				

==== By county ====
County	Jim Justice Democratic		Bill Cole Republican		Charlotte Pritt Mountain		Various candidates Other parties		Margin		Total
County	#	%	#	%	#	%	#	%	#	%	Total
Barbour	2,701	44.31%	2,928	48.03%	263	4.31%	204	3.35%	−227	−3.72%	6,096
Berkeley	14,879	35.55%	23,103	55.20%	2,320	5.54%	1,550	3.70%	−8,224	−19.65%	41,852
Boone	5,649	64.22%	2,622	29.81%	399	4.54%	126	1.43%	3,027	34.41%	8,796
Braxton	2,959	58.70%	1,765	35.01%	247	4.90%	70	1.39%	1,194	23.69%	5,041
Brooke	4,570	48.34%	4,087	43.23%	498	5.27%	298	3.15%	483	5.11%	9,453
Cabell	18,148	54.46%	12,065	36.21%	2,322	6.97%	789	2.37%	6,083	18.25%	33,324
Calhoun	1,193	45.62%	1,157	44.24%	204	7.80%	61	2.33%	36	1.38%	2,615
Clay	1,683	55.60%	1,138	37.59%	154	5.09%	52	1.72%	545	18.00%	3,027
Doddridge	905	31.69%	1,739	60.89%	142	4.97%	70	2.45%	−834	−29.20%	2,856
Fayette	9,631	62.06%	4,560	29.38%	1,004	6.47%	324	2.09%	5,071	32.68%	15,519
Gilmer	1,195	46.59%	1,116	43.51%	171	6.67%	83	3.24%	79	3.08%	2,565
Grant	1,313	27.62%	3,203	67.39%	101	2.12%	136	2.86%	−1,890	−39.76%	4,753
Greenbrier	8,589	60.56%	4,361	30.75%	998	7.04%	234	1.65%	4,228	29.81%	14,182
Hampshire	2,537	30.09%	5,239	62.15%	380	4.51%	274	3.25%	−2,702	−32.05%	8,430
Hancock	5,322	42.81%	5,992	48.19%	688	5.53%	431	3.47%	−670	−5.39%	12,433
Hardy	2,237	40.22%	3,015	54.21%	173	3.11%	137	2.46%	−778	−13.99%	5,562
Harrison	14,317	50.63%	11,916	42.14%	1,274	4.51%	772	2.73%	2,401	8.49%	28,279
Jackson	6,200	50.44%	5,122	41.67%	801	6.52%	168	1.37%	1,078	8.77%	12,291
Jefferson	9,588	40.23%	11,599	48.67%	1,639	6.88%	1,008	4.23%	−2,011	−8.44%	23,834
Kanawha	44,756	58.59%	23,849	31.22%	6,650	8.71%	1,137	1.49%	20,907	27.37%	76,392
Lewis	3,222	46.25%	3,294	47.28%	307	4.41%	144	2.07%	−72	−1.03%	6,967
Lincoln	4,141	57.65%	2,534	35.28%	405	5.64%	103	1.43%	1,607	22.37%	7,183
Logan	6,781	55.52%	4,497	36.82%	788	6.45%	147	1.20%	2,284	18.70%	12,213
Marion	12,158	52.46%	8,952	38.63%	1,286	5.55%	780	3.37%	3,206	13.83%	23,176
Marshall	6,491	49.46%	5,696	43.40%	640	4.88%	298	2.27%	795	6.06%	13,125
Mason	5,566	54.27%	4,062	39.60%	459	4.47%	170	1.66%	1,504	14.66%	10,257
McDowell	3,459	56.09%	2,493	40.42%	144	2.34%	71	1.15%	966	15.66%	6,167
Mercer	9,323	40.28%	12,662	54.70%	797	3.44%	364	1.57%	−3,339	−14.43%	23,146
Mineral	3,485	30.44%	7,047	61.56%	436	3.81%	479	4.18%	−3,562	−31.12%	11,447
Mingo	5,168	54.89%	3,699	39.28%	427	4.53%	122	1.30%	1,469	15.60%	9,416
Monongalia	16,016	44.29%	14,343	39.66%	3,979	11.00%	1,825	5.05%	1,673	4.63%	36,163
Monroe	2,797	47.67%	2,562	43.66%	425	7.24%	84	1.43%	235	4.00%	5,868
Morgan	1,929	25.96%	4,764	64.11%	510	6.86%	228	3.07%	−2,835	−38.15%	7,431
Nicholas	5,780	60.03%	3,358	34.87%	353	3.67%	138	1.43%	2,422	25.15%	9,629
Ohio	8,377	46.48%	8,048	44.66%	1,084	6.02%	512	2.84%	329	1.83%	18,021
Pendleton	1,335	42.26%	1,568	49.64%	164	5.19%	92	2.91%	−233	−7.38%	3,159
Pleasants	1,713	53.99%	1,288	40.59%	109	3.44%	63	1.99%	425	13.39%	3,173
Pocahontas	1,975	53.67%	1,227	33.34%	379	10.30%	99	2.69%	748	20.33%	3,680
Preston	3,964	31.66%	6,575	52.52%	571	4.56%	1,410	11.26%	−2,611	−20.85%	12,520
Putnam	13,410	53.28%	9,956	39.56%	1,400	5.56%	402	1.60%	3,454	13.72%	25,168
Raleigh	16,841	56.46%	11,140	37.35%	1,307	4.38%	541	1.81%	5,701	19.11%	29,829
Randolph	5,120	46.78%	4,500	41.11%	572	5.23%	754	6.89%	620	5.66%	10,946
Ritchie	1,284	31.67%	2,523	62.23%	164	4.05%	83	2.05%	−1,239	−30.56%	4,054
Roane	2,794	52.64%	2,090	39.37%	333	6.27%	91	1.71%	704	13.26%	5,308
Summers	2,727	55.20%	1,793	36.30%	335	6.78%	85	1.72%	934	18.91%	4,940
Taylor	3,005	45.45%	3,102	46.92%	272	4.11%	232	3.51%	−97	−1.47%	6,611
Tucker	1,481	42.58%	1,609	46.26%	185	5.32%	203	5.84%	−128	−3.68%	3,478
Tyler	1,449	39.57%	1,969	53.77%	151	4.12%	93	2.54%	−520	−14.20%	3,662
Upshur	3,726	40.53%	4,716	51.29%	480	5.22%	272	2.96%	−990	−10.77%	9,194
Wayne	8,558	55.79%	5,824	37.96%	667	4.35%	292	1.90%	2,734	17.82%	15,341
Webster	1,474	49.17%	1,269	42.33%	170	5.67%	85	2.84%	205	6.84%	2,998
Wetzel	3,234	51.48%	2,545	40.51%	319	5.08%	184	2.93%	689	10.97%	6,282
Wirt	1,171	48.19%	1,106	45.51%	102	4.20%	51	2.10%	65	2.67%	2,430
Wood	17,240	48.26%	15,959	44.67%	1,653	4.63%	874	2.45%	1,281	3.59%	35,726
Wyoming	4,842	61.68%	2,641	33.64%	267	3.40%	100	1.27%	2,201	28.04%	7,850
Totals	350,408	49.09%	301,987	42.30%	42,068	5.89%	19,395	2.72%	48,421	6.78%	713,858

Counties that flipped from Democratic to Republican

- Hancock (largest city: Weirton)
- Hardy (largest city: Moorefield)
- Jefferson (largest city: Charles Town)
- Pendleton (largest city: Franklin)
- Tucker (largest city: Parsons)

Counties that flipped from Republican to Democratic

- Monongalia (largest city: Morgantown)
- Monroe (largest city: Peterstown)
- Putnam (largest municipality: Hurricane)
- Raleigh (largest city: Beckley)
- Jackson (largest city: Ravenswood)

==== By congressional district ====
Justice won two of three congressional districts, which both elected Republicans.

District	Justice	Cole	Pritt	Representative
1st	45.2%	45.4%	6%	David McKinley
2nd	48%	43%	7%	Alex Mooney
3rd	55%	38%	5%	Evan Jenkins

=== Maps ===
Support for Moran by county:
>10%
4–5%
3–4%
2–3%
1–2%
<1%

Support for Pritt by county:
>11%
10–11%
8–9%
7–8%
6–7%
5–6%
4–5%
3–4%
<3%
