= 2011 West Virginia gubernatorial special election =

- October 4, 2011
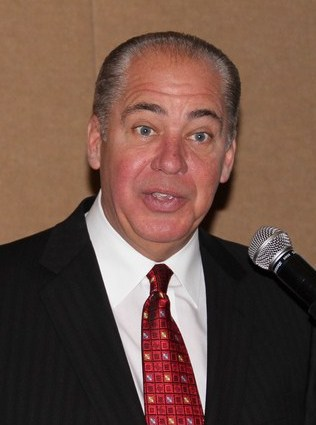

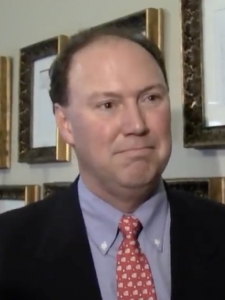
| Nominee | Earl Ray Tomblin | Bill Maloney |
| Party | Democratic | Republican |
| Popular vote | 149,202 | 141,656 |
| Percentage | 49.55% | 47.05% |
- County results Tomblin: 40–50% 50–60% 60–70% 70–80% 80–90% >90% Maloney: 40–50% 50–60% 60–70% 70–80%
Governor before election
Earl Ray Tomblin (acting)
Democratic
Elected Governor
Earl Ray Tomblin
Democratic

The 2011 West Virginia gubernatorial special election was a special election held on October 4, 2011, to fill the office of the West Virginia governor, which became vacant when Joe Manchin resigned after he won a U.S. Senate special election. Lieutenant Governor and Senate President Earl Ray Tomblin, first in the line of succession to the governorship, subsequently became acting governor. On January 18, 2011, the West Virginia Supreme Court of Appeals ruled that a special election for the governorship must be held so a new governor can be in place by November 15, 2011, exactly one year after Manchin resigned. The primary election was held on May 14. Tomblin and Republican Bill Maloney won their respective primaries.

Tomblin defeated William Maloney by a slim margin, notably winning over 90% of the vote in his home county of Logan County. Tomblin was declared the winner of the election by the Associated Press on October 4, 2011, and was inaugurated on November 13, 2011. With a margin of 2.5%, the special election was the closest race of the 2011 gubernatorial election cycle. Tomblin was re-elected governor in 2012 in a rematch with Maloney.

This was one of the two Democratic-held governorships up for election in a state that John McCain won in the 2008 presidential election.

== Democratic primary ==
=== Candidates ===
==== Declared ====
- Jeff Kessler, acting president of the West Virginia Senate
- Arne Moltis
- John Perdue, West Virginia state treasurer
- Natalie Tennant, West Virginia secretary of state
- Rick Thompson, speaker of the West Virginia House of Delegates
- Earl Ray Tomblin, acting governor and president of the West Virginia Senate

==== Declined ====
- Brooks McCabe, state senator
- Charlotte Pritt, former state senator, Democratic primary candidate for governor in 1992, Democratic nominee for governor in 1996 and write-in candidate for governor in 1992, and Mountain Party nominee for governor in 2016

=== Polling ===
| Poll source | Date(s) administered | Sample size | Margin of error | Jeff Kessler | Arne Moltis | John Perdue | Natalie Tennant | Rick Thompson | Earl Ray Tomblin | Other/ Undecided |
|---|---|---|---|---|---|---|---|---|---|---|
| Public Policy Polling | May 11–12, 2011 | 742 | ± 3.6% | 4% | 1% | 11% | 17% | 20% | 33% | 12% |
| Public Policy Polling | April 21–24, 2011 | 590 | ± 4.0% | 5% | 1% | 17% | 16% | 15% | 32% | 14% |

=== Primary results ===
Democratic primary results by county: Tomblin: 30–40%; 40–50%; 50–60%; 60–70%; 80–90%; Thompson: 40–50%; 60–70%; Tennant: 30–40%; Perdue: 30–40%; 40–50%; Kessler: 40–50%; 60–70%

Democratic primary results
| Party | Candidate | Votes | % |
|---|---|---|---|
| Democratic | Earl Ray Tomblin (incumbent) | 51,348 | 40.4% |
| Democratic | Rick Thompson | 30,631 | 24.1% |
| Democratic | Natalie Tennant | 22,106 | 17.4% |
| Democratic | John Perdue | 15,995 | 12.6% |
| Democratic | Jeff Kessler | 6,665 | 5.2% |
| Democratic | Arne Moltis | 481 | 0.4% |
| Total votes | | 127,111 | 100.0% |

== Republican primary ==
=== Candidates ===
==== Declared ====
- Clark Barnes, state senator
- Mitch Carmichael, state delegate
- Ralph William Clark, professor
- Cliff Ellis
- Larry Faircloth, former state delegate and candidate for governor in 2004
- Betty Ireland, former West Virginia secretary of state
- Bill Maloney, businessman
- Mark Sorsaia, Putnam County district attorney

==== Declined ====
- Shelley Moore Capito, U.S. representative
- Patrick Lane, state delegate
- Jon McBride, retired United States naval officer; former NASA astronaut
- John Raese, businessman and nominee for the U.S. Senate in 1984, 2006, and 2010
- Mike Stuart, West Virginia Republican Party chairman

=== Polling ===
| Poll source | Date(s) administered | Sample size | Margin of error | Clark Barnes | Mitch Carmichael | Ralph Clark | Cliff Ellis | Larry Faircloth | Betty Ireland | Bill Maloney | Mark Sorsaia | Other/ Undecided |
|---|---|---|---|---|---|---|---|---|---|---|---|---|
| Public Policy Polling | May 11–12, 2011 | 314 | ± 5.5% | 8% | 4% | 1% | 0% | 6% | 31% | 32% | 4% | 14% |
| Public Policy Polling | April 21–24, 2011 | 274 | ± 5.9% | 8% | 8% | 2% | 1% | 2% | 31% | 17% | 4% | 28% |

=== Primary results ===
Maloney: 30–40%; 40–50%; 50–60%; 60–70%; 70–80%; Ireland: 30–40%; 40–50%; Barnes: 30–40%; 40–50%; 50–60%; 60–70%; 70–80%; Faircloth: 30–40%

Republican primary results
| Party | Candidate | Votes | % |
|---|---|---|---|
| Republican | Bill Maloney | 27,871 | 45.0% |
| Republican | Betty Ireland | 19,027 | 30.7% |
| Republican | Clark Barnes | 5,891 | 9.5% |
| Republican | Mark Sorsaia | 3,177 | 5.1% |
| Republican | Larry Faircloth | 2,400 | 3.9% |
| Republican | Mitch Carmichael | 2,073 | 3.3% |
| Republican | Ralph Clark | 1,164 | 1.9% |
| Republican | Cliff Ellis | 283 | 0.5% |
| Total votes | | 61,886 | 100.0% |

== General election ==
=== Candidates ===
- Bob Henry Baber (Mountain), writer and former mayor of Richwood
- Rick Bartlett (write-in)
- Harry Bertram (American Third Position Party)
- Phil Hudok (write-in), teacher and registered Constitution Party member
- Marla Dee Ingels (Independent)
- Bill Maloney (Republican), Monongalia County businessman
- Earl Ray Tomblin (Democratic), acting governor and president of the West Virginia Senate
- Donald Lee Underwood (write-in)

=== Predictions ===
| Source | Ranking | As of |
|---|---|---|
| Rothenberg Political Report | Lean D | November 4, 2011 |
| Governing | Lean D | November 4, 2011 |
| Cook | Lean D | November 4, 2011 |
| Sabato | Likely D | November 4, 2011 |

=== Polling ===
| Poll source | Date(s) administered | Sample size | Margin of error | Earl Ray Tomblin (D) | Bill Maloney (R) | Undecided |
|---|---|---|---|---|---|---|
| Public Policy Polling | September 30 – October 2, 2011 | 932 | ± 3.2% | 47% | 46% | 7% |
| Public Policy Polling | September 1–4, 2011 | 708 | ± 3.7% | 46% | 40% | 14% |
| Public Policy Polling | May 11–12, 2011 | 723 | ± 3.6% | 45% | 30% | 25% |
| Public Policy Polling | April 21–24, 2011 | 850 | ± 3.4% | 56% | 23% | 21% |

=== Results ===
West Virginia gubernatorial special election official results, 2011
| Party | Candidate | Votes | % | ±% |
|---|---|---|---|---|
| Democratic | Earl Ray Tomblin (incumbent) | 149,202 | 49.55% | −20.26 |
| Republican | Bill Maloney | 141,656 | 47.05% | +21.32 |
| Mountain | Bob Henry Baber | 6,083 | 2.02% | −2.44 |
| Independent | Marla Ingels | 2,875 | 0.95% | |
| American Third Position | Harry Bertram | 1,111 | 0.37% | +0.37 |
| write-in candidate | Phil Hudok | 76 | 0.03% | |
| write-in candidate | Donald Lee Underwood | 54 | 0.02% | |
| write-in candidate | John R. "Rick" Bartlett | 27 | 0.01% | |
| Margin of victory | | 7,546 | 2.51% | −41.57% |
| Total votes | | 301,084 | 100.00% | |
| Democratic hold | | Swing | | |

==== By county ====
| County | Earl Ray Tomblin Democratic | | Bill Maloney Republican | | Bob Henry Baber Mountain | | Various candidates Other parties | | Margin | | Total |
| County | # | % | # | % | # | % | # | % | # | % | Total |
|---|---|---|---|---|---|---|---|---|---|---|---|
| Barbour | 1,922 | 49.52% | 1,762 | 45.40% | 77 | 1.98% | 120 | 3.09% | +160 | +4.12% | 3,881 |
| Berkeley | 4,501 | 38.67% | 6,678 | 57.38% | 170 | 1.46% | 290 | 2.49% | −2,177 | −18.70% | 11,639 |
| Boone | 3,391 | 73.53% | 1,085 | 23.53% | 50 | 1.08% | 86 | 1.86% | +2,306 | +50.00% | 4,612 |
| Braxton | 1,476 | 56.53% | 1,007 | 38.57% | 82 | 3.14% | 46 | 1.76% | +469 | +17.96% | 2,611 |
| Brooke | 2,102 | 52.30% | 1,700 | 42.30% | 71 | 1.77% | 146 | 3.63% | +402 | +10.00% | 4,019 |
| Cabell | 7,482 | 52.03% | 6,414 | 44.61% | 217 | 1.51% | 266 | 1.85% | +1,068 | +7.43% | 14,379 |
| Calhoun | 515 | 45.49% | 536 | 47.35% | 51 | 4.51% | 30 | 2.65% | −21 | −1.86% | 1,132 |
| Clay | 813 | 53.38% | 632 | 41.50% | 38 | 2.50% | 40 | 2.63% | +181 | +11.88% | 1,523 |
| Doddridge | 476 | 28.00% | 1,116 | 65.65% | 56 | 3.29% | 52 | 3.06% | −640 | −37.65% | 1,700 |
| Fayette | 3,568 | 58.46% | 2,149 | 35.21% | 194 | 3.18% | 192 | 3.15% | +1,419 | +23.25% | 6,103 |
| Gilmer | 539 | 39.69% | 698 | 51.40% | 107 | 7.88% | 14 | 1.03% | −159 | −11.71% | 1,358 |
| Grant | 408 | 22.17% | 1,374 | 74.67% | 14 | 0.76% | 44 | 2.39% | −966 | −52.50% | 1,840 |
| Greenbrier | 2,633 | 48.92% | 2,350 | 43.66% | 241 | 4.48% | 158 | 2.94% | +283 | +5.26% | 5,382 |
| Hampshire | 959 | 30.70% | 1,997 | 63.92% | 50 | 1.60% | 118 | 3.78% | −1,038 | −33.23% | 3,124 |
| Hancock | 2,753 | 49.88% | 2,422 | 43.88% | 94 | 1.70% | 250 | 4.53% | +331 | +6.00% | 5,519 |
| Hardy | 812 | 37.52% | 1,146 | 52.96% | 34 | 1.57% | 172 | 7.95% | −334 | −15.43% | 2,164 |
| Harrison | 6,165 | 48.31% | 6,038 | 47.32% | 206 | 1.61% | 352 | 2.76% | +127 | +1.00% | 12,761 |
| Jackson | 2,717 | 44.38% | 3,114 | 50.87% | 83 | 1.36% | 208 | 3.40% | −397 | −6.48% | 6,122 |
| Jefferson | 3,237 | 46.64% | 3,363 | 48.45% | 153 | 2.20% | 188 | 2.71% | −126 | −1.82% | 6,941 |
| Kanawha | 18,376 | 49.14% | 17,780 | 47.54% | 705 | 1.89% | 536 | 1.43% | +596 | +1.59% | 37,397 |
| Lewis | 1,545 | 45.66% | 1,650 | 48.76% | 103 | 3.04% | 86 | 2.54% | −105 | −3.10% | 3,384 |
| Lincoln | 2,270 | 66.28% | 1,065 | 31.09% | 42 | 1.23% | 48 | 1.40% | +1,205 | +35.18% | 3,425 |
| Logan | 6,734 | 91.27% | 567 | 7.69% | 23 | 0.31% | 54 | 0.73% | +6,167 | +83.59% | 7,378 |
| Marion | 5,624 | 54.18% | 4,240 | 40.84% | 171 | 1.65% | 346 | 3.33% | +1,384 | +13.33% | 10,381 |
| Marshall | 3,246 | 48.22% | 3,123 | 46.40% | 122 | 1.81% | 240 | 3.57% | +123 | +1.83% | 6,731 |
| Mason | 2,221 | 47.30% | 2,057 | 43.80% | 38 | 0.81% | 380 | 8.09% | +164 | +3.49% | 4,696 |
| McDowell | 1,747 | 75.63% | 504 | 21.82% | 19 | 0.82% | 40 | 1.73% | +1,243 | +53.81% | 2,310 |
| Mercer | 3,930 | 48.80% | 3,817 | 47.40% | 116 | 1.44% | 190 | 2.36% | +113 | +1.40% | 8,053 |
| Mineral | 1,306 | 35.02% | 2,245 | 60.20% | 42 | 1.13% | 136 | 3.65% | −939 | −25.18% | 3,729 |
| Mingo | 3,912 | 84.75% | 629 | 13.63% | 29 | 0.63% | 46 | 1.00% | +3,283 | +71.12% | 4,616 |
| Monongalia | 5,580 | 37.85% | 8,011 | 54.35% | 586 | 3.98% | 564 | 3.83% | −2,431 | −16.49% | 14,741 |
| Monroe | 954 | 45.54% | 988 | 47.16% | 63 | 3.01% | 90 | 4.30% | −34 | −1.62% | 2,095 |
| Morgan | 886 | 32.69% | 1,644 | 60.66% | 72 | 2.66% | 108 | 3.99% | −758 | −27.97% | 2,710 |
| Nicholas | 2,137 | 50.01% | 1,896 | 44.37% | 144 | 3.37% | 96 | 2.25% | +241 | +5.64% | 4,273 |
| Ohio | 3,775 | 43.79% | 4,491 | 52.09% | 153 | 1.77% | 202 | 2.34% | −716 | −8.31% | 8,621 |
| Pendleton | 490 | 37.26% | 735 | 55.89% | 32 | 2.43% | 58 | 4.41% | −245 | −18.63% | 1,315 |
| Pleasants | 669 | 50.80% | 590 | 44.80% | 26 | 1.97% | 32 | 2.43% | +79 | +6.00% | 1,317 |
| Pocahontas | 568 | 40.66% | 649 | 46.46% | 104 | 7.44% | 76 | 5.44% | −81 | −5.80% | 1,397 |
| Preston | 1,656 | 33.25% | 3,003 | 60.29% | 90 | 1.81% | 232 | 4.66% | −1,347 | −27.04% | 4,981 |
| Putnam | 4,376 | 38.05% | 6,790 | 59.04% | 155 | 1.35% | 180 | 1.57% | −2,414 | −20.99% | 11,501 |
| Raleigh | 5,192 | 48.77% | 5,024 | 47.19% | 218 | 2.05% | 212 | 1.99% | +168 | +1.58% | 10,646 |
| Randolph | 2,604 | 53.30% | 1,991 | 40.75% | 155 | 3.17% | 136 | 2.78% | +613 | +12.55% | 4,886 |
| Ritchie | 556 | 31.74% | 1,108 | 63.24% | 32 | 1.83% | 56 | 3.20% | −552 | −31.51% | 1,752 |
| Roane | 1,228 | 45.98% | 1,289 | 48.26% | 82 | 3.07% | 72 | 2.70% | −61 | −2.28% | 2,671 |
| Summers | 1,170 | 55.93% | 808 | 38.62% | 62 | 2.96% | 52 | 2.49% | +362 | +17.30% | 2,092 |
| Taylor | 1,300 | 45.26% | 1,436 | 50.00% | 52 | 1.81% | 84 | 2.92% | −136 | −4.74% | 2,872 |
| Tucker | 763 | 49.55% | 682 | 44.29% | 33 | 2.14% | 62 | 4.03% | +81 | +5.26% | 1,540 |
| Tyler | 652 | 38.47% | 922 | 54.40% | 37 | 2.18% | 84 | 4.96% | −270 | −15.93% | 1,695 |
| Upshur | 1,673 | 37.11% | 2,566 | 56.92% | 111 | 2.46% | 158 | 3.50% | −893 | −19.81% | 4,508 |
| Wayne | 3,960 | 57.00% | 2,767 | 39.83% | 70 | 1.01% | 150 | 2.16% | +1,193 | +17.17% | 6,947 |
| Webster | 879 | 62.65% | 437 | 31.15% | 45 | 3.21% | 42 | 2.99% | +442 | +31.50% | 1,403 |
| Wetzel | 1,816 | 52.65% | 1,385 | 40.16% | 74 | 2.15% | 174 | 5.04% | +431 | +12.50% | 3,449 |
| Wirt | 488 | 45.56% | 541 | 50.51% | 16 | 1.49% | 26 | 2.43% | −53 | −4.95% | 1,071 |
| Wood | 6,396 | 42.85% | 7,888 | 52.84% | 230 | 1.54% | 414 | 2.77% | −1,492 | −9.99% | 14,928 |
| Wyoming | 2,054 | 70.68% | 757 | 26.05% | 43 | 1.48% | 52 | 1.79% | +1,297 | +44.63% | 2,906 |

Counties that flipped from Democratic to Republican

- Berkeley (largest municipality: Martinsburg)
- Calhoun (largest city: Grantsville)
- Doddridge (largest municipality: West Union)
- Gilmer (largest city: Glenville)
- Grant (largest municipality: Petersburg)
- Hampshire (largest municipality: Romney)
- Hardy (largest city: Moorefield)
- Jackson (largest city: Ravenswood)
- Jefferson (largest city: Charles Town)
- Lewis (largest city: Weston)
- Mineral (largest municipality: Keyser)
- Monongalia (largest city: Morgantown)
- Monroe (largest city: Peterstown)
- Morgan (largest municipality: Berkeley Springs)
- Ohio (largest city: Wheeling)
- Pendleton (largest city: Franklin)
- Pocahontas (largest city: Marlinton)
- Preston (largest municipality: Kingwood)
- Putnam (largest municipality: Hurricane)
- Ritchie (largest municipality: Harrisville)
- Roane (largest city: Spencer)
- Taylor (largest city: Grafton)
- Tyler (largest city: Paden City)
- Upshur (largest municipality: Buckhannon)
- Wirt (largest municipality: Elizabeth)
- Wood (largest municipality: Parkersburg)
