= 2012 West Virginia gubernatorial election =

- November 6, 2012
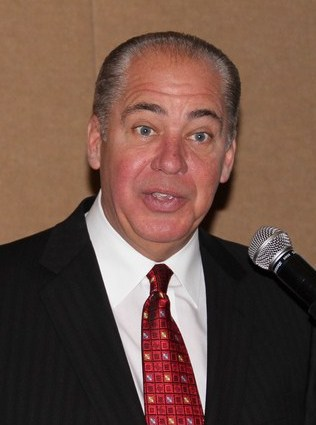

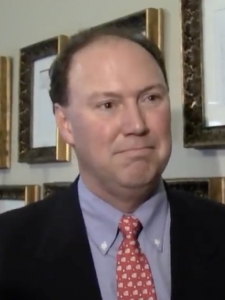
Nominee	Earl Ray Tomblin	Bill Maloney
Party	Democratic	Republican
Popular vote	335,468	303,291
Percentage	50.49%	45.65%
- Tomblin: 40–50% 50–60% 60–70% 70–80% Maloney: 40–50% 50–60% 60–70%
Governor before election
Earl Ray Tomblin
Democratic
Elected Governor
Earl Ray Tomblin
Democratic

The 2012 West Virginia gubernatorial election was held on November 6, 2012, to elect the governor of West Virginia. Democratic incumbent Earl Ray Tomblin, who was elected governor in a special election in 2011, was elected to a full four-year term. The election was a rematch of the 2011 special election.

As of 2026, this was the last time a Democratic governor was re-elected in the state, the last time a Democrat won and served a full term as governor of West Virginia, (Note: Then-Democrat Jim Justice won the 2016 election, but he became a Republican in 2017.) and the last time a Democrat was elected governor of West Virginia with a majority of votes.

== Democratic primary ==
=== Candidates ===
- Arne Moltis, candidate for governor in 2011
- Earl Ray Tomblin, incumbent governor

==== Declined ====
- Jeff Kessler, state senator, president of the state senate, and candidate for governor in 2011
- Brooks McCabe, state senator

=== Results ===
Democratic primary results
Party	Candidate	Votes	%
Democratic	Earl Ray Tomblin (incumbent)	170,481	84.4%
Democratic	Arne Moltis	31,587	15.6%
Total votes		202,068	100.0%

== Republican primary ==
=== Candidates ===
- Ralph William Clark, philosophy professor at West Virginia University and candidate for governor in 2011
- Bill Maloney, businessman and Republican nominee for governor in 2011

==== Declined ====
- Clark Barnes, state senator and candidate for governor in 2011 (did not file)
- Mark Sorsaia, Putnam County prosecutor and candidate for governor in 2011 (did not file)
- Mike Stuart, West Virginia Republican Party chairman

=== Results ===
Republican primary results
Party	Candidate	Votes	%
Republican	Bill Maloney	86,925	83.5%
Republican	Ralph William Clark	17,165	16.5%
Total votes		104,090	100.0%

== General election ==
=== Candidates ===
- Jesse Johnson (Mountain), former gubernatorial and senate nominee
- Bill Maloney (R), businessman and Republican nominee for governor in 2011
- David Moran (Libertarian), farmer and retired engineer
- Earl Ray Tomblin (D), incumbent governor

=== Other potential candidates ===
- Norman Ferguson (NPA)
- Phil Hudok (Constitution), write-in candidate for governor in 2011

=== Debates ===
- Complete video of debate, October 9, 2012 - C-SPAN

=== Predictions ===
Source	Ranking	As of
The Cook Political Report	Lean D	November 1, 2012
Sabato's Crystal Ball	Lean D	November 5, 2012
Rothenberg Political Report	Lean D	November 2, 2012
Real Clear Politics	Likely D	November 5, 2012

=== Polling ===
Poll source	Date(s) administered	Sample size	Margin of error	Earl Ray Tomblin (D)	Bill Maloney (R)	Undecided
R.L. Repass	August 22–25, 2012	401	± 4.9%	56%	35%	9%
R.L. Repass	April 25–28, 2012	410	± 4.8%	60%	32%	8%

=== Results ===
West Virginia gubernatorial election, 2012
Party	Candidate	Votes	%	±%
Democratic	Earl Ray Tomblin (incumbent)	335,468	50.49%	+0.94%
Republican	Bill Maloney	303,291	45.65%	−1.40%
Mountain	Jesse Johnson	16,787	2.53%	+0.51%
Libertarian	David Moran	8,909	1.34%	N/A
Total votes		664,455	100.00%	N/A
Democratic hold				

==== By county ====
County	Earl Ray Tomblin Democratic		Bill Maloney Republican		Jesse Johnson Mountain		David Moran Libertarian		Margin		Total
County	#	%	#	%	#	%	#	%	#	%	Total
Barbour	2,757	47.98%	2,789	48.54%	101	1.76%	99	1.72%	−32	−0.56%	5,746
Berkeley	17,195	47.13%	17,999	49.33%	635	1.74%	658	1.80%	−804	−2.20%	36,487
Boone	5,800	66.99%	2,624	30.31%	180	2.08%	54	0.62%	3,176	36.68%	8,658
Braxton	2,796	59.10%	1,784	37.71%	115	2.43%	36	0.76%	1,012	21.39%	4,731
Brooke	5,067	55.49%	3,797	41.58%	133	1.46%	135	1.48%	1,270	13.91%	9,132
Cabell	17,447	54.52%	13,357	41.74%	801	2.50%	396	1.24%	4,090	12.78%	32,001
Calhoun	1,051	48.50%	986	45.50%	96	4.43%	34	1.57%	65	3.00%	2,167
Clay	1,605	52.99%	1,278	42.19%	126	4.16%	20	0.66%	327	10.80%	3,029
Doddridge	872	32.00%	1,721	63.16%	94	3.45%	38	1.39%	−849	−31.16%	2,725
Fayette	7,353	52.67%	5,932	42.49%	505	3.62%	170	1.22%	1,421	10.18%	13,960
Gilmer	1,345	53.71%	1,033	41.25%	89	3.55%	37	1.48%	312	12.46%	2,504
Grant	1,453	32.35%	2,919	64.98%	64	1.42%	56	1.25%	−1,466	−32.64%	4,492
Greenbrier	6,357	49.52%	5,821	45.35%	482	3.75%	177	1.38%	536	4.18%	12,837
Hampshire	3,610	45.79%	3,944	50.03%	188	2.38%	142	1.80%	−334	−4.24%	7,884
Hancock	6,077	51.06%	5,454	45.83%	184	1.55%	186	1.56%	623	5.23%	11,901
Hardy	2,868	55.87%	2,074	40.41%	100	1.95%	91	1.77%	794	15.47%	5,133
Harrison	12,818	49.18%	12,460	47.80%	534	2.05%	253	0.97%	358	1.37%	26,065
Jackson	5,508	47.48%	5,711	49.23%	296	2.55%	85	0.73%	−203	−1.75%	11,600
Jefferson	11,091	50.97%	9,514	43.72%	666	3.06%	490	2.25%	1,577	7.25%	21,761
Kanawha	38,785	52.21%	31,584	42.52%	3,352	4.51%	563	0.76%	7,201	9.69%	74,284
Lewis	2,920	46.03%	3,192	50.32%	135	2.13%	96	1.51%	−272	−4.29%	6,343
Lincoln	4,241	61.32%	2,476	35.80%	152	2.20%	47	0.68%	1,765	25.52%	6,916
Logan	9,480	78.83%	2,393	19.90%	89	0.74%	64	0.53%	7,087	58.93%	12,026
Marion	11,358	53.05%	9,236	43.14%	446	2.08%	370	1.73%	2,122	9.91%	21,410
Marshall	6,593	51.53%	5,807	45.38%	241	1.88%	154	1.20%	786	6.14%	12,795
Mason	5,212	53.42%	4,229	43.35%	211	2.16%	104	1.07%	983	10.08%	9,756
McDowell	4,007	65.94%	1,919	31.58%	88	1.45%	63	1.04%	2,088	34.36%	6,077
Mercer	9,257	44.36%	10,974	52.59%	410	1.96%	226	1.08%	−1,717	−8.23%	20,867
Mineral	4,874	44.72%	5,708	52.37%	120	1.10%	197	1.81%	−834	−7.65%	10,899
Mingo	6,078	68.44%	2,656	29.91%	95	1.07%	52	0.59%	3,422	38.53%	8,881
Monongalia	14,160	45.73%	15,034	48.55%	1,142	3.69%	628	2.03%	−874	−2.82%	30,964
Monroe	2,320	45.04%	2,592	50.32%	177	3.44%	62	1.20%	−272	−5.28%	5,151
Morgan	3,075	44.85%	3,439	50.16%	203	2.96%	139	2.03%	−364	−5.31%	6,856
Nicholas	4,367	49.46%	4,173	47.26%	206	2.33%	83	0.94%	194	2.20%	8,829
Ohio	8,603	48.67%	8,519	48.19%	338	1.91%	217	1.23%	84	0.48%	17,677
Pendleton	1,720	53.40%	1,391	43.19%	68	2.11%	42	1.30%	329	10.21%	3,221
Pleasants	1,452	51.49%	1,306	46.31%	31	1.10%	31	1.10%	146	5.18%	2,820
Pocahontas	1,863	53.40%	1,384	39.67%	185	5.30%	57	1.63%	479	13.73%	3,489
Preston	4,096	37.30%	6,020	54.82%	220	2.00%	645	5.87%	−1,924	−17.52%	10,981
Putnam	10,303	43.67%	12,534	53.13%	584	2.48%	172	0.73%	−2,231	−9.46%	23,593
Raleigh	12,602	44.43%	14,900	52.53%	577	2.03%	284	1.00%	−2,298	−8.10%	28,363
Randolph	5,070	52.52%	4,115	42.63%	299	3.10%	169	1.75%	955	9.89%	9,653
Ritchie	1,438	38.48%	2,171	58.09%	84	2.25%	44	1.18%	−733	−19.61%	3,737
Roane	2,609	51.76%	2,191	43.46%	185	3.67%	56	1.11%	418	8.29%	5,041
Summers	2,511	53.57%	1,969	42.01%	152	3.24%	55	1.17%	542	11.56%	4,687
Taylor	2,755	46.62%	2,969	50.24%	87	1.47%	99	1.68%	−214	−3.62%	5,910
Tucker	1,527	48.62%	1,420	45.21%	64	2.04%	130	4.14%	107	3.41%	3,141
Tyler	1,424	43.90%	1,711	52.74%	68	2.10%	41	1.26%	−287	−8.85%	3,244
Upshur	3,425	41.66%	4,464	54.29%	209	2.54%	124	1.51%	−1,039	−12.64%	8,222
Wayne	7,713	55.08%	5,928	42.33%	241	1.72%	122	0.87%	1,785	12.75%	14,004
Webster	1,635	58.58%	1,019	36.51%	100	3.58%	37	1.33%	616	22.07%	2,791
Wetzel	3,282	56.19%	2,367	40.52%	117	2.00%	75	1.28%	915	15.67%	5,841
Wirt	1,071	49.45%	1,030	47.55%	34	1.57%	31	1.43%	41	1.89%	2,166
Wood	16,284	48.55%	16,272	48.52%	567	1.69%	415	1.24%	12	0.04%	33,538
Wyoming	4,288	57.41%	3,002	40.19%	121	1.62%	58	0.78%	1,286	17.22%	7,469
Totals	335,468	50.49%	303,291	45.65%	16,787	2.53%	8,909	1.34%	32,177	4.84%	664,455

Counties that flipped from Republican to Democratic

- Calhoun (largest city: Grantsville)
- Gilmer (largest city: Glenville)
- Hardy (largest city: Moorefield)
- Jefferson (largest city: Charles Town)
- Ohio (largest borough: Wheeling)
- Pendleton (largest city: Franklin)
- Pocahontas (largest city: Marlinton)
- Roane (largest city: Spencer)
- Wirt (largest municipality: Elizabeth)
- Wood (largest municipality: Parkersburg)

Counties that flipped from Democratic to Republican

- Barbour (largest city: Philippi)
- Mercer (largest city: Bluefield)
- Raleigh (largest city: Beckley)

==== By congressional district ====
Ray Tomblin won two of three congressional districts, including one that elected a Republican.

District	Ray Tomblin	Maloney	Representative
1st	47.99%	48.21%	David McKinley
2nd	49.4%	46.19%	Shelley Moore Capito
3rd	54.43%	42.25%	Nick Rahall
