= 1996 West Virginia gubernatorial election =

- November 5, 1996
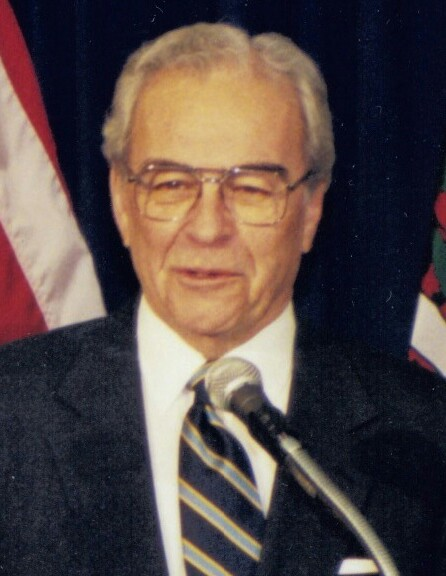

Nominee	Cecil Underwood	Charlotte Pritt
Party	Republican	Democratic
Popular vote	324,518	287,870
Percentage	51.61%	45.84%
- County results Underwood: 40–50% 50–60% 60–70% 70–80% Pritt: 40–50% 50–60% 60–70% 70–80%
Governor before election
Gaston Caperton
Democratic
Elected Governor
Cecil Underwood
Republican

The 1996 West Virginia gubernatorial election took place on November 5, 1996 to elect the governor of West Virginia. Republican Cecil Underwood, who had previously been the governor of West Virginia from 1957 to 1961, defeated Democratic State Senator Charlotte Pritt. Concurrently, the state voted the opposite way federally, choosing Democratic U.S. presidential nominee, incumbent Bill Clinton over Republican nominee Bob Dole in the presidential election that year.

Pritt was the first woman to secure a major party nomination for governor of West Virginia. This was the last time a Republican was elected governor of West Virginia until 2020, when incumbent Jim Justice was re-elected, who was first elected in 2016 as a Democrat and switched to the Republican Party seven months into his term, making him the first Republican governor since 2001 when Underwood left office.

== Democratic primary ==
=== Candidates ===
- Bob Henry Baber
- Larrie Bailey, former state treasurer
- Louis J. Davis
- Jim Lees, attorney
- Joe Manchin III, state senator from Fairmont
- Richard E. Moon
- Bobbie Edward Myers
- Charlotte Pritt, former state senator from Charleston and candidate for governor in 1992
- Frank Rochetti
- Lyle Sattes
- Fred Schell

West Virginia Democratic gubernatorial primary, 1996
Party	Candidate	Votes	%
Democratic	Charlotte Pritt	130,107	39.54%
Democratic	Joe Manchin	107,124	32.56%
Democratic	Jim Lees	64,100	19.48%
Democratic	Larrie Bailey	15,733	4.78%
Democratic	Bobbie Edward Myers	3,038	0.92%
Democratic	Lyle Sattes	2,931	0.89%
Democratic	Bob Henry Baber	1,456	0.44%
Democratic	Louis J. Davis	1,351	0.41%
Democratic	Frank Rochetti	1,330	0.40%
Democratic	Richard E. Koon	1,154	0.35%
Democratic	Fred Schell	733	0.22%
Total votes		329,057	100.00%

== Republican primary ==
=== Candidates ===
- Jon McBride, retired astronaut, Navy veteran, and businessman
- David McKinley, former state delegate, and former state party chair
- Cecil Underwood, former governor and nominee for U.S. Senate in 1960

West Virginia Republican gubernatorial primary, 1996
Party	Candidate	Votes	%
Republican	Cecil Underwood	54,628	40.78%
Republican	Jon McBride	44,255	33.03%
Republican	David McKinley	35,089	26.19%
Total votes		133,972	100.00%

== General election ==
=== Results ===
West Virginia gubernatorial election, 1996
Party	Candidate	Votes	%	±%
Republican	Cecil Underwood	324,518	51.63%	+15.07%
Democratic	Charlotte Pritt	287,870	45.80%	−10.21%
Libertarian	Wallace Johnson	16,171	2.57%	+2.57%
Margin of victory		36,648	5.83%	−13.62%
Total votes		628,559	100.00%	N/A
Republican gain from Democratic		Swing		

==== By county ====
County	Cecil Underwood Republican		Charlotte Pritt Democratic		Wallace Johnson Libertarian		Margin		Total
County	#	%	#	%	#	%	#	%	Total
Barbour	3,214	53.75%	2,596	43.42%	169	2.83%	618	10.34%	5,979
Berkeley	10,666	53.34%	8,851	44.26%	479	2.40%	1,815	9.08%	19,996
Boone	2,846	32.26%	5,787	65.60%	189	2.14%	−2,941	−33.34%	8,822
Braxton	2,276	46.10%	2,569	52.04%	92	1.86%	−293	−5.93%	4,937
Brooke	4,158	44.37%	4,942	52.74%	271	2.89%	−784	−8.37%	9,371
Cabell	18,480	58.00%	12,524	39.30%	860	2.70%	5,956	18.69%	31,864
Calhoun	1,508	54.98%	1,191	43.42%	44	1.60%	317	11.56%	2,743
Clay	1,710	47.97%	1,760	49.37%	95	2.66%	−50	−1.40%	3,565
Doddridge	1,797	69.36%	735	28.37%	59	2.28%	1,062	40.99%	2,591
Fayette	5,427	37.44%	8,558	59.04%	511	3.53%	−3,131	−21.60%	14,496
Gilmer	1,560	59.36%	1,026	39.04%	42	1.60%	534	20.32%	2,628
Grant	3,233	75.66%	973	22.77%	67	1.57%	2,260	52.89%	4,273
Greenbrier	6,705	54.95%	5,129	42.03%	369	3.02%	1,576	12.91%	12,203
Hampshire	3,339	57.71%	2,335	40.36%	112	1.94%	1,004	17.35%	5,786
Hancock	5,701	42.13%	7,610	56.24%	220	1.63%	−1,909	−14.11%	13,531
Hardy	2,909	69.49%	1,214	29.00%	63	1.51%	1,695	40.49%	4,186
Harrison	13,744	51.48%	12,303	46.08%	653	2.45%	1,441	5.40%	26,700
Jackson	5,814	57.46%	4,046	39.98%	259	2.56%	1,768	17.47%	10,119
Jefferson	5,986	47.30%	6,370	50.34%	299	2.36%	−384	−3.03%	12,655
Kanawha	41,776	56.11%	30,795	41.36%	1,886	2.53%	10,981	14.75%	74,457
Lewis	3,604	58.39%	2,355	38.16%	213	3.45%	1,249	20.24%	6,172
Lincoln	3,281	39.61%	4,815	58.13%	187	2.26%	−1,534	−18.52%	8,283
Logan	4,164	27.14%	11,010	71.77%	167	1.09%	−6,846	−44.63%	15,341
Marion	9,818	44.95%	11,544	52.85%	479	2.19%	−1,726	−7.90%	21,841
Marshall	6,481	47.67%	6,630	48.76%	485	3.57%	−149	−1.10%	13,596
Mason	5,539	53.00%	4,602	44.03%	310	2.97%	937	8.97%	10,451
McDowell	2,502	30.21%	5,653	68.26%	126	1.52%	−3,151	−38.05%	8,281
Mercer	9,748	52.54%	8,373	45.13%	434	2.34%	1,375	7.41%	18,555
Mineral	5,134	56.62%	3,684	40.63%	250	2.76%	1,450	15.99%	9,068
Mingo	3,210	29.68%	7,466	69.02%	141	1.30%	−4,256	−39.35%	10,817
Monongalia	13,808	51.83%	12,089	45.38%	743	2.79%	1,719	6.45%	26,640
Monroe	2,821	56.07%	2,109	41.92%	101	2.01%	712	14.15%	5,031
Morgan	2,758	54.70%	2,237	44.37%	47	0.93%	521	10.33%	5,042
Nicholas	3,901	46.36%	4,252	50.53%	261	3.10%	−351	−4.17%	8,414
Ohio	9,853	55.50%	7,482	42.14%	418	2.35%	2,371	13.36%	17,753
Pendleton	1,911	59.29%	1,266	39.28%	46	1.43%	645	20.01%	3,223
Pleasants	1,899	60.25%	1,164	36.93%	89	2.82%	735	23.32%	3,152
Pocahontas	1,800	53.99%	1,474	44.21%	60	1.80%	326	9.78%	3,334
Preston	6,115	59.18%	3,939	38.12%	279	2.70%	2,176	21.06%	10,333
Putnam	11,582	63.46%	6,052	33.16%	618	3.39%	5,530	30.30%	18,252
Raleigh	11,638	49.60%	10,841	46.20%	987	4.21%	797	3.40%	23,466
Randolph	5,300	52.68%	4,389	43.63%	371	3.69%	911	9.06%	10,060
Ritchie	2,553	66.47%	1,207	31.42%	81	2.11%	1,346	35.04%	3,841
Roane	2,862	55.06%	2,225	42.80%	111	2.14%	637	12.25%	5,198
Summers	2,137	49.27%	2,073	47.80%	127	2.93%	64	1.48%	4,337
Taylor	3,173	57.46%	2,186	39.59%	163	2.95%	987	17.87%	5,522
Tucker	1,814	55.82%	1,323	40.71%	113	3.48%	491	15.11%	3,250
Tyler	2,750	71.84%	1,006	26.28%	72	1.88%	1,744	45.56%	3,828
Upshur	4,682	65.05%	2,351	32.67%	164	2.28%	2,331	32.39%	7,197
Wayne	7,390	48.13%	7,601	49.51%	362	2.36%	−211	−1.37%	15,353
Webster	1,183	35.35%	2,090	62.44%	74	2.21%	−907	−27.10%	3,347
Wetzel	3,194	51.96%	2,799	45.53%	154	2.51%	395	6.43%	6,147
Wirt	1,219	57.66%	832	39.36%	63	2.98%	387	18.31%	2,114
Wood	18,679	58.51%	12,319	38.59%	927	2.90%	6,360	19.92%	31,925
Wyoming	3,166	37.28%	5,118	60.26%	209	2.46%	−1,952	−22.98%	8,493
Totals	324,518	51.63%	287,870	45.80%	16,171	2.57%	36,648	5.83%	628,559

Counties that flipped from Democratic to Republican

- Barbour
- Berkeley
- Calhoun
- Cabell
- Gilmer
- Hardy
- Jackson
- Kanawha
- Lewis
- Mason
- Mercer
- Mineral
- Monongalia
- Monroe
- Ohio
- Pendleton
- Preston
- Raleigh
- Randolph
- Roane
- Taylor
- Summers
- Tyler
- Tucker
- Harrison
- Pleasants
- Putnam
- Upshur
- Wetzel
- Wirt
- Wood
