= Bill Maloney =

American businessman and politician

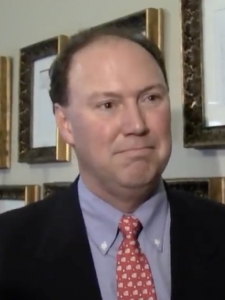

Personal details
- Born: October 2, 1958 (age 67) Syracuse, New York, U.S.
- Party: Republican
- Education: Lehigh University (BS)

William Maloney is an American businessman and politician. He was a two-time candidate for the governorship of West Virginia. He was the Republican nominee in the 2011 West Virginia gubernatorial special election, in which he lost by 7,546 votes, and again for the regular election in 2012, which he lost by 31,434 votes.

Maloney co-founded a drilling company in 1984. He was involved in the Plan B rescue attempt during the 2010 Chilean mine disaster.

== Business career ==
With a business partner, Maloney founded a company called North American Drillers in Morgantown in 1984. The company specialized in drilling large-diameter shafts for the coal, oil and natural gas industries. The business grew to 150 employees when Maloney sold his interest in 2006. Maloney has also invested in start-up companies.

Maloney is a member of the Society of Mining Engineers, the West Virginia Coal Mining Institute, the Independent Oil and Gas Association of West Virginia, and the National Groundwater Association. He is a past chairman of the West Virginia chapter of Associated Builders and Contractors.

== Chilean mine rescue ==
Maloney used his drilling expertise in support of the Plan B attempt to rescue the 33 trapped Chilean miners. Maloney joined the Center Rock team led by Brandon Fisher. Maloney had invested in Fisher's company as start-up. The Plan B effort was ultimately successful, and the miners were saved.

Since returning to the United States, Maloney founded the Mine Rescue Drilling Fund, which supports mine rescues efforts and mine rescue technology in the United States.

== Political career ==
=== Campaign for West Virginia governor, 2011 ===
Maloney declared his campaign for governor in February. He ran in the special election to fill the unexpired term of Joe Manchin. Maloney's name was listed first on the Republican primary ballot.

Maloney is a conservative Republican. He wanted to reform the state's tax structure and legal system.

Maloney won the May 14 primary election with 45% of the vote, but lost the general election to Acting Governor Earl Ray Tomblin by less than 3%.

=== Campaign for West Virginia governor, 2012 ===
Maloney defeated Ralph William Clark in the May 8, 2012 primary election to become the Republican nominee. He faced Governor Earl Ray Tomblin and lost by 4.8%.

== Personal life ==
Maloney and his wife Sharon have two adult daughters and one grandson. He has a degree in industrial engineering from Lehigh University. Maloney is a member of Chestnut Ridge Church.

Party political offices
| Preceded by Russ Weeks | Republican nominee for Governor of West Virginia; 2011, 2012 | Succeeded by Bill Cole |
