= Chestnut Ridge Church =

Church in Morgantown, West Virginia, US

- Chestnut Ridge Church
- 39°40′23″N 79°51′14″W
- Location: 2223 Cheat Road, Morgantown, WV 26508
- Denomination: Non-denominational
- Website: chesnutridgechurch.com

Chestnut Ridge Church is a nondenominational, evangelical megachurch in Morgantown, West Virginia. The church spawned two sister churches: South Ridge Church, in Fairmont, West Virginia, and River Ridge in Charleston, West Virginia.

== History ==
The church was founded in 1985 by Tim Haring.

In 2007, The Dominion Post named the church one of the 100 most influential organizations in West Virginia because of its size, impact on the community and its new $12 million facility built in 2006. CRC's senior pastor, Tim Haring, was named as number 21 on the paper's list.

== Deep Water Media ==
In 2006, CRC launched a production company and released its first album under the label Deep Water Records. The album was called Vertical by J. Nicholson. Deep Water Media produced a 10-show touring production across the East Coast to launch Vertical.

=== The Passion ===
Each Easter, the church produces a completely original rock-opera that tells the story of Christ. In 2006, Deep Water Media took over production of the Passion. In 2007, the production moved to the church's new venue at Cheat Lake after thirteen years at Morgantown High School. In its new home, the show attracted a record audience of nearly 7,000 over a three-day run. Over the years, more than 25,000 people have seen the show.

In January 2010, it was announced that the 15-year run of The Passion would not be continued, in order to re-focus the resources used to produce The Passion in other areas.
