= Charlotte Pritt =

American politician (born 1949)

Member of the West Virginia Senate from the 17th district
- In office December 1, 1988 – December 1, 1992
- Preceded by: Tod Kaufman
- Succeeded by: Martha Yeager Walker

Member of the West Virginia House of Delegates from the 23rd district
- In office December 1, 1984 – December 1, 1988

Personal details
- Born: Charlotte Jean Pritt; January 2, 1949 (age 77) Charleston, West Virginia, U.S.
- Party: Democratic (before 2012); Mountain (2012–2020); Independent (2020–present)
- Spouse: James Midkiff (m. 1995; div. 1998)
- Children: 3 stepchildren
- Education: Marshall University (BA, MA)

Charlotte Jean Pritt (born January 2, 1949) is an American educator, businesswoman, and politician in the U.S. state of West Virginia. From 1984 to 1988, she represented Kanawha County in the West Virginia House of Delegates, before serving in the West Virginia State Senate from 1988 to 1992.

Pritt ran unsuccessfully for Governor of West Virginia in 1992, 1996, and 2016 and for West Virginia Secretary of State in 2000. She faced future U.S. Senator Joe Manchin in two of these races, beating him in the 1996 Democratic primary and losing to him in the 2000 primary.

== Career ==
Prior to entering politics, Pritt, the daughter of a coal miner, worked as a high school English teacher and a college professor. During the span of her educational career, she served as director of communications at Kanawha County Schools and director of the West Virginia Writing Project at the West Virginia College of Graduate Studies. She had also served as an independent marketer and president of the Charleston office for SteelOaks/Acorn Investments and formerly owned Pritt Associates.

When elected to the West Virginia State Legislature, she directed two federal education grants and the National Writing Program in West Virginia.

== Statewide campaigns ==
=== 1992 ===
Pritt ran for governor as a Democrat in the primary election in 1992, but lost to Gaston Caperton. She gained notoriety initially by challenging then-Governor Caperton on his grocery and gasoline taxes and opposition to collective bargaining. She also managed to garner strong union support. Even so, Caperton had outspent Pritt 10 to 1 and defeated her in the primary, 42.68 to 36.45 percent. West Virginia attorney general Mario Palumbo came in third, with 20.1 percent.

After losing the Democratic primary to Caperton, Pritt refused to endorse her opponent and mounted an independent write-in bid for governor in the general election. This action led to a splinter in the state's party establishment. Pritt garnered 12.4 percent in the race, in which Caperton defeated Republican Cleve Benedict, 51 to 36.6 percent.

=== 1996 ===
Pritt ran as a Democrat for governor and defeated future governor and U.S. Senator Joe Manchin in the primary, 39.5 to 32.6 percent. She was the first woman to secure the West Virginia gubernatorial nomination of either of the two major political parties and gained the endorsement of then President Bill Clinton.

During the primary, Manchin had attempted to portray her as "anti-gun", which Pritt denied by stating she owned a shotgun and being a 12-year member of the National Rifle Association of America (NRA) at that time. After the primary, a group known as "Democrats for Underwood", which consisted of West Virginia Democrats who refused to back her in the general election. Pritt dismissed the defections as coming from Democratic officials "who would be Republicans in any other state anyway".

Further complicating matters, the National Senate Republican Committee (NSRC) and West Virginia State Victory Committee funded a television ad campaign against Pritt falsely accusing her of voting for a bill that would allow children to access pornography and proposing to teach first graders about condom use, among others. Underwood distanced himself from the negative ads. Political opponents had additionally attempted to paint her as "flaky" and "a little off the wall" by alleging that her mother had dabbled in fortune-telling.

Pritt lost in the general election to Republican Cecil Underwood, 51.6 to 45.8 percent. While she sued the NSRC after the election, it was ruled that too much time had passed for it to have caused harm to Pritt. Pritt called on her former opponent Underwood to testify during her suit.

Her nomination was particularly ground-breaking because only 20 of the 134 West Virginia legislators were women in 1996, and per the U.S. Census Bureau, fewer women hold jobs in West Virginia than any other state. A study published in 1999 in the Journal of Women, Politics & Policy found that the press coverage surrounding her and Mary Sue Terry's gubernatorial campaigns had been negative, albeit primarily based on issues aside from gender. None of the state's major newspapers endorsed her campaign. Joe Manchin and Gaston Caperton backed the Republican nominee Underwood.

=== 2000 ===
Pritt ran for West Virginia Secretary of State in 2000, losing the Democratic primary to Manchin, 41.1 to 32.9 percent. After the election, she returned to educational pursuits and studied for a degree in nutrition.

=== 2016 ===
Pritt was nominated as the Mountain Party's candidate for West Virginia governor on July 16, 2016, at the party's convention. Rev. Jim Lewis, who was previously expected to get the nod, got sidelined by knee surgery.

On Bray Cary's statewide show Decision Makers, Pritt called her billionaire Democratic gubernatorial opponent Jim Justice a "Republican". In response, West Virginia Democratic Party chairwoman Belinda Biafore allegedly signed and sent out a letter to an electronic mailing list claiming that the GOP had adopted Pritt, that the Republicans were funding her campaign, and that "a vote for Pritt is a vote for Cole" (a reference to Bill Cole, the GOP nominee). Pritt called the unsubstantiated accusations a "blindfaced lie" and instead argued that a vote for her is a vote against the "conservative status quo".

Pritt was not invited to the debate between the Republican and Democratic nominees. She finished third in the general election, receiving less than 6% of the vote, behind Justice (the winner) and Cole.

== Mountain Party ==
From 2012 to 2014, she was chairwoman of the Mountain Party, which is the Green Party's state branch affiliate for West Virginia.

== Political activism ==
During campaign events, Pritt would recount standing on picket lines. The Rolling Stone noted that she was a longtime advocate for the environment, women's rights and worker safety. She started her political career arguing against nursing home closures and against gas taxes. In July 1993, while working as a consultant for citizens groups, she authored a column calling for citizen action against the construction of the APCO 760 kV high voltage line, which was successfully brought to a halt.

During the 2016 election cycle, she supported Senator Bernie Sanders in the Democratic presidential primary and Green Party presidential candidate Jill Stein for the general election. She also endorsed the Occupy Charleston Movement in 2016.

During the 2018 election cycle, Pritt endorsed Paula Jean Swearengin in the senatorial primary against incumbent Joe Manchin. Pritt said that the race was "a chance for an FDR Democrat to take the party back".

Having been hit hard by the effects of coal mining on miners, she campaigned for marijuana legalization. This culminated in the passage of Senate Bill 386 in April 2017 to allow marijuana use for chronically ill patients. Pritt was also a speaker at the 2017 Indivisible March for West Virginia in celebration of Women's Equality Day.

In 2017, Pritt defended a Raleigh County, West Virginia doctor, Michael Kostenko, who was sentenced to 20 years in prison on federal drug charges for giving out painkillers. Federal prosecutors said Kostenko continued to prescribe oxycodone to patients, even through signs of abuse. After Kostenko pleaded guilty, Pritt said at his sentencing that he was a great doctor who used "non-traditional" and "non-invasive" medical techniques.

During the 2020 election cycle, Pritt endorsed and cast her vote by absentee ballot for Tulsi Gabbard in the Democratic presidential primaries; she later voted for Swearengin in her senatorial bid against incumbent Shelley Moore Capito in the general election. She has advocated for the pardon of Edward Snowden and Julian Assange. She was also featured in "Water For Life: Is Safe Water a Human Right?", an episode of the PBS documentary series Global Mosaic.

She is currently a board member of the Greater Sissonville Development Council (GSDC), a volunteer-led non-profit organization to improve the Sissonville community. The non-profit seeks to increase community events, improve infrastructure, and promote economic and housing opportunities.

== Personal life ==
Pritt was the oldest of six children and grew up on a farm. Her father, who had worked as a mechanic, mine safety officer, and president of United Mine Workers Local 1766, died from black lung disease.

Pritt from 1989 to 1994, dated U.S. Congressman Steve Cohen. After that she was married in 1995 to a chiropractor, James Midkiff, and had three stepchildren. They divorced in 1998 after he admitted to an affair he had with a female who had been a member of Pritt's campaign staff. In 1999, Pritt began to date once more actor and politician, Jesse Johnson, whom she had dated before in the 1980s. They date after their renewed interest for over a decade and remain good friends.

Today, she is the president of Better Balance LLC, a West Virginia-based educational and wellness consulting firm. Her work has enabled her to travel abroad to Cusco, Peru, and "the first all-green hospital" in Kolkata, India. Pritt owns property in Buzzard Rock Mountain, where she grew up.

== Electoral history ==
West Virginia Senate District 17, Position B election, 1988
Party	Candidate	Votes	%
Democratic	Charlotte Pritt	38,229	54.08
Republican	Charles Jones	32,464	45.92
Total votes		70,693	100.00

West Virginia Democratic gubernatorial primary, 1992
Party	Candidate	Votes	%
Democratic	Gaston Caperton	142,261	42.68
Democratic	Charlotte Pritt	115,498	34.65
Democratic	Mario Palumbo	66,984	20.10
Democratic	Larry Butcher	4,994	1.50
Democratic	Rodger Belknap	3,590	1.08
Total votes		333,327	100.00

West Virginia gubernatorial election, 1992
Party	Candidate	Votes	%
Democratic	Gaston Caperton	368,302	56.01
Republican	Cleve Benedict	240,390	36.56
Nonpartisan	Charlotte Pritt (write-in)	48,873	7.43
Total votes		657,565	100.00

West Virginia Democratic gubernatorial primary, 1996
Party	Candidate	Votes	%
Democratic	Charlotte Pritt	130,107	39.54
Democratic	Joe Manchin	107,124	32.56
Democratic	Jim Lees	64,100	19.48
Democratic	Larrie Bailey	15,733	4.78
Democratic	Bobbie Edward Myers	3,038	0.92
Democratic	Lyle Sattes	2,931	0.89
Democratic	Bob Henry Baber	1,456	0.44
Democratic	Louis J. Davis	1,351	0.41
Democratic	Frank Rochetti	1,330	0.40
Democratic	Richard E. Koon	1,154	0.35
Democratic	Fred Schell	733	0.22
Total votes		329,057	100.00

West Virginia gubernatorial election, 1996
Party	Candidate	Votes	%
Republican	Cecil H. Underwood	324,518	51.63
Democratic	Charlotte Pritt	287,870	45.80
Libertarian	Wallace Johnson	16,171	2.57
Total votes		628,559	100.00

West Virginia Secretary of State Democratic primary, 2000
Party	Candidate	Votes	%
Democratic	Joe Manchin	141,839	51.08
Democratic	Charlotte Pritt	80,148	28.86
Democratic	Mike Oliverio	35,424	12.76
Democratic	Bobby Nelson	20,259	7.30
Total votes		277,670	100.00

West Virginia gubernatorial election, 2016
Party	Candidate	Votes	%
Democratic	Jim Justice	350,408	49.09
Republican	Bill Cole	301,987	42.30
Mountain	Charlotte Pritt	42,068	5.89
Libertarian	David Moran	15,354	2.15
Constitution	Phil Hudok	4,041	0.57
Total votes		713,858	100.00

Party political offices
Preceded by Gaston Caperton	Democratic nominee for Governor of West Virginia; 1996	Succeeded by Bob Wise
Preceded by Jesse Johnson	Mountain nominee for Governor of West Virginia; 2016	Succeeded by Daniel Lutz
