= Orion Strategies =

U.S. strategic communications firm

- Industry: Public relations, consulting
- Founded: 2007; 19 years ago
- Founder: Curtis Wilkerson
- Headquarters: Buckhannon, West Virginia, U.S.
- Area served: United States
- Website: www.orion-strategies.com

Orion Strategies LLC is a strategic communications firm that provides public relations, lobbying and advocacy. The firm also has a research division that conducts polling and focus groups and a creative division for video, graphic design and digital.

== History ==
Orion Strategies was founded in 2007 by Curtis Wilkerson. The company has locations in Washington, DC; Harrisburg, PA; Columbus, OH; Charleston, WV; Buckhannon, WV; and Martinsburg, WV.

== Activities ==
Orion Strategies provides strategic communication services to its clients. This includes public relations, bipartisan federal and state lobbying, grassroots advocacy, media relations, creative services, opinion polling and research.

=== Polling ===
Orion has carried out non-partisan polling for a number of organizations including the West Virginia Chamber of Commerce and news organizations including The State Journal. FiveThirtyEight gave Orion Strategies a B− ranking in its review of pollsters in the USA.

=== Natural gas industry ===
Orion has conducted a significant amount of work for the natural gas industry. In 2018 it produced a series of reports arguing in favor of fracking. In 2021, Orion took credit for the passage of West Virginia's Critical Infrastructure Protection Act, a law it advanced on behalf of the American Fuel and Petrochemical Manufacturers, that created felony penalties for protests targeting oil and gas facilities and was described by its sponsor John Kelly as having been "requested by the natural gas industry".

== Criticisms ==
In 2011, Politico Morning Tech spoke of Orion being an instrument of AT&T during the telecommunication firm's attempted merger with T-Mobile. Politico questioned the validity of this support.
