= Bill Cole (West Virginia politician) =

American businessman, politician and former West Virginia Senate member

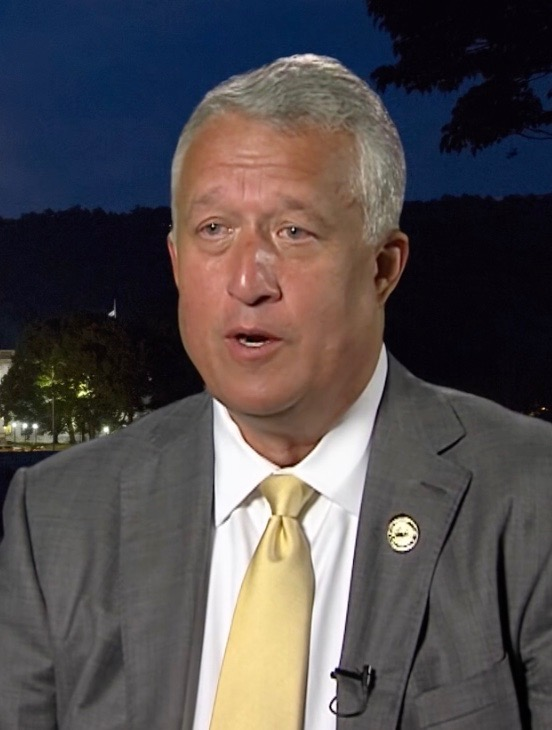

President of the West Virginia Senate Lieutenant Governor of West Virginia
- In office January 14, 2015 – January 11, 2017
- Governor: Earl Ray Tomblin
- Preceded by: Jeff Kessler
- Succeeded by: Mitch Carmichael

Member of the West Virginia Senate from the 6th district
- In office January 9, 2013 – January 11, 2017
- Preceded by: Mark Wills
- Succeeded by: Chandler Swope

Member of the West Virginia House of Delegates from the 24th district
- In office May 28, 2010 – January 12, 2011
- Preceded by: John Shott
- Succeeded by: Marty Gearheart

Personal details
- Born: William Paul Cole III; May 16, 1956 (age 70) Boston, Massachusetts, U.S.
- Party: Republican
- Spouse: Brownie Deemer
- Children: 4
- Education: Northwood University (BBA)

William Paul Cole III (born May 16, 1956) is an American businessman, politician and a former Republican member of the West Virginia Senate, representing the 6th district from 2013 to 2017. He was the President of the Senate (and thus first in line to the governorship) from 2015 to 2017. Cole also served in the West Virginia House of Delegates from May 28, 2010, to January 12, 2011, to fill the vacancy caused by the resignation of Delegate John Shott.

Cole was the Republican nominee for West Virginia Governor in 2016, choosing to run for the office rather than run for re-election to the state senate. He lost the election to Jim Justice and was succeeded by Mitch Carmichael as Senate President.

== Family and education ==
After earning his Bachelor of Business Administration degree from Northwood University, Cole returned to Bluefield, West Virginia, to work in his family business operated by his father, Paul Cole, who was Bluefield, West Virginia's longest-serving mayor. He has two daughters, Elizabeth and Taylor. His two older sons, Jason and Lee, work for Cole Automotive Group.

== Elections ==
In 2012, Cole challenged Democratic Senator and former state Delegate Mark Wills, who had been appointed to the post. Cole was unopposed in the Republican primary held on May 8, 2012. Cole received 2,757 votes in the primary. He went on to win the November 6, 2012, general election with 18,598 votes and 53.3% of the vote against Senator Wills.

In 2015, Cole declared his candidacy for Governor of West Virginia in the 2016 election. Senator Shelley Moore Capito, state Attorney General Patrick Morrisey, Charleston Mayor Danny Jones and West Virginia's three congressmen all endorsed Cole, essentially clearing the path for Cole to become the Republican nominee uncontested. Cole received fundraising support from Indiana Gov. Mike Pence and from former Texas Gov. Rick Perry. Cole lost the general election to businessman Jim Justice.

== Tenure ==
Following the Republican takeover of the State Senate, the GOP Caucus elected him President of the Senate. He was the first Republican to hold the post in 82 years.

In 2015 Cole, who is an auto dealer in his home state and Kentucky, championed Senate Bill 453, which restricts car manufacturers from selling vehicles directly to consumers, instead requiring they sell through franchises. In December 2015, Cole wrote an official letter to the Surface Transportation Board, opposing a proposed merger of the Norfolk Southern Railway with the Canadian Pacific railway. Canadian Pacific broke off negotiations in April 2016.

Among the bills signed into law during Cole's tenure as Senate president include making the election of judges nonpartisan, banning abortions after the 20th week of pregnancy, legalizing concealed carry without need of a permit, repealing the state's prevailing wage law, and enacting a right-to-work law. The latter four bills were enacted into law over Democratic governor Earl Ray Tomblin's veto.

In May 2016 Cole endorsed Republican presidential candidate Donald Trump during Trump's campaign rally at the Charleston Civic Center.

== Electoral history ==
West Virginia State Senate 6th District Election, 2012
Party	Candidate	Votes	%
Republican	Bill Cole	18,598	53.28
Democratic	Mark Wills (inc.)	16,307	46.72
Total		34,905	100.00%
Republican gain from Democratic			

West Virginia gubernatorial election, 2016
Party	Candidate	Votes	%
Democratic	Jim Justice	350,408	49.09%
Republican	Bill Cole	301,987	42.30%
Mountain	Charlotte Pritt	42,068	5.89%
Libertarian	David Moran	15,354	2.15%
Constitution	Phil Hudok	4,041	0.57%
Total		713,858	100.00%
Democratic hold			

Political offices
Preceded by Jeff Kessler	President of the West Virginia Senate; 2015–2017	Succeeded by Mitch Carmichael
Party political offices
Preceded by Bill Maloney	Republican nominee for Governor of West Virginia; 2016	Succeeded by Jim Justice
