= Earl Ray Tomblin =

Governor of West Virginia from 2010 to 2017

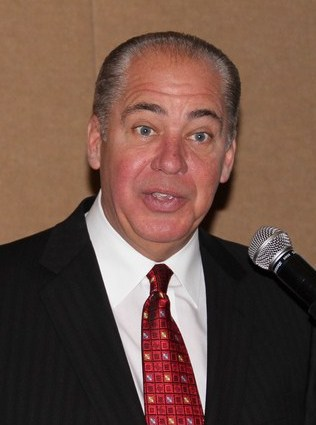

35th Governor of West Virginia
- In office November 13, 2011 – January 16, 2017; Acting: November 15, 2010 – November 13, 2011
- Lieutenant: Jeff Kessler; Bill Cole
- Preceded by: Joe Manchin
- Succeeded by: Jim Justice

President of the West Virginia Senate Lieutenant Governor of West Virginia (Note: Assumed title of lieutenant governor in 2000.)
- In office January 3, 1995 – November 13, 2011; On leave: November 15, 2010 – November 13, 2011
- Preceded by: Keith Burdette
- Succeeded by: Jeff Kessler

Member of the West Virginia Senate from the 7th district
- In office December 1, 1980 – November 13, 2011
- Preceded by: Ned Grubb
- Succeeded by: Art Kirkendoll

Personal details
- Born: March 15, 1952 (age 74) Logan County, West Virginia, U.S.
- Party: Democratic
- Spouse: Joanne Tomblin (m. 1979)
- Children: 1
- Education: West Virginia University (BS); Marshall University (MBA)

Earl Ray Tomblin (born March 15, 1952) is an American politician who served as the 35th governor of West Virginia from 2011 to 2017. A member of the Democratic Party, he previously served in the West Virginia Senate from 1980 to 2011 and as president of the West Virginia Senate from 1995 to 2011. Tomblin became acting governor in November 2010 following Joe Manchin's election to the U.S. Senate. He won a special election in October 2011 to fill the unexpired term ending on January 14, 2013, and was elected to a full term as governor in November 2012.

== Early life and education ==
Tomblin was born in Logan County, West Virginia, and is the son of Freda M. (née Jarrell) and Earl Tomblin. His mother was 18 years old when he was born. He has a Bachelor of Science degree from West Virginia University where he was a member of Kappa Alpha Order and then went along to receive a Master of Business Administration degree from Marshall University.

== State Legislature and Senate President ==
Tomblin was elected to the West Virginia House of Delegates in 1974, and reelected in 1976 and 1978. He won election to the Senate for the 7th district in 1980 and was subsequently re-elected every four years until his election as governor.

Tomblin was elected on January 3, 1995, as the 48th President of the West Virginia Senate. Having served in the position for almost seventeen years, he is the longest serving Senate President in West Virginia's history. Tomblin became the first Lieutenant Governor of West Virginia upon creation of the honorary designation in 2000.

As a senator, he represented the 7th Senate District encompassing Boone, Lincoln, Logan, and Wayne counties.

=== Acting governor ===
Tomblin became acting governor when Joe Manchin resigned after being elected to fill the United States Senate seat of the late Senator Robert Byrd. Tomblin is the first person to serve as acting governor under West Virginia's current constitution.

While acting governor, Tomblin also retained the title of Senate President, per the state constitution. However, he did not participate in legislative business or preside over the Senate while acting governor.

== Governor of West Virginia ==
=== Elections ===
==== 2011 special ====
Under the West Virginia constitution, when the governorship becomes vacant with more than one year remaining in the term, a special election must be held for the remainder of the term. In Manchin's case, he left office two years into his second term. Tomblin stated his desire to run for the remainder of the term. Following a ruling by the Supreme Court of Appeals on January 18, 2011, a special gubernatorial election was scheduled for October 4, 2011. Tomblin was successful in the Democratic primary, beating a field of six contenders, while Morgantown businessman Bill Maloney emerged as the Republican nominee in the May 14 primary. Tomblin went on to win the general election against Maloney and was sworn in as governor on November 13, 2011. Immediately before being sworn in as governor, Tomblin resigned from the state senate.

==== 2012 ====
Tomblin ran for re-election to a full term in 2012, and defeated Maloney in a rematch.

=== Tenure ===
In the 2016 presidential election, Tomblin endorsed fellow Democrat Hillary Clinton.

==== Abortion ====
Tomblin is anti-abortion. Despite this, in March 2014, Tomblin vetoed a bill that would have banned abortions in West Virginia after 20 weeks, which he said was due to constitutionality issues. In March 2015, Tomblin again vetoed the bill; however, his veto was overridden by the West Virginia legislature.

==== Approval ratings ====
A May 2013 survey by Republican strategist Mark Blankenship showed Tomblin's job approval rating to be at 69 percent, unchanged from two months earlier. According to a poll conducted by Public Policy Polling in September 2013, Tomblin had an approval rating of 47 percent with 35 percent disapproving, up from 44 percent in 2011.

=== Term limit ===
Tomblin was barred from running for a second full term in 2016. Under the constitution, a partial term counts toward the limit of two consecutive terms.

== Personal life ==
Tomblin was married on September 8, 1979, to Joanne Tomblin, a native New Yorker and graduate of Marshall University, who served as the president of Southern West Virginia Community and Technical College from 1999 to 2015. They reside in Chapmanville and have one son, Brent. Tomblin attends the First Presbyterian Church of Logan.

== Electoral history ==
West Virginia House of Delegates District 16 Election, 1974
Party	Candidate	Votes	%
Democratic	Tom Mathis	7,139	25.24
Democratic	Earl Ray Tomblin	7,086	25.06
Democratic	Sammy Dalton	7,061	24.97
Democratic	Charles Gilliam	6,993	24.73

West Virginia House of Delegates District 16 Democratic Primary Election, 1976
Party	Candidate	Votes	%
Democratic	Earl Ray Tomblin (inc.)	8,545	14.88
Democratic	Denver Mathis (inc.)	7,641	13.31
Democratic	Sammy Dalton (inc.)	6,745	11.75
Democratic	Charles Gilliam (inc.)	6,523	11.36
Democratic	William Calyton	4,331	7.54
Democratic	Mike Hill	4,144	7.22
Democratic	Jimmy Vance	3,274	5.70
Democratic	Cris Farley	3,246	5.65
Democratic	John Mendez	3,169	5.52
Democratic	Sim Howze Jr.	2,197	3.83
Democratic	Florena Colvin	1,618	2.82
Democratic	Dollie Mae Hill	1,556	2.71
Democratic	Homer Vaughan	1,535	2.67
Democratic	Charles Jesse Dillon	1,261	2.20
Democratic	Robert Marcum Jr.	844	1.47
Democratic	Greg Anderson Adams	783	1.36

West Virginia House of Delegates District 16 Election, 1976
Party	Candidate	Votes	%
Democratic	Thomas Mathis (inc.)	17,872	25.15
Democratic	Earl Ray Tomblin (inc.)	17,843	25.11
Democratic	Charles Gilliam (inc.)	17,701	24.91
Democratic	Sammy Dalton (inc.)	17,641	24.83

West Virginia House of Delegates District 16 Democratic Primary Election, 1978
Party	Candidate	Votes	%
Democratic	Earl Ray Tomblin (inc.)	8,119	18.66
Democratic	Charles Gilliam (inc.)	7,863	18.07
Democratic	Tomas Mathis (inc.)	6,990	16.07
Democratic	Sammy Dalton (inc.)	6,766	15.55
Democratic	Claude Ellis	4,340	9.98
Democratic	Gary Hoke	3,343	7.68
Democratic	Larry Hendricks	3,177	7.30
Democratic	James Trent	2,905	6.68

West Virginia House of Delegates District 16 Election, 1978
Party	Candidate	Votes	%
Democratic	Tom Mathis (inc.)	11,523	21.10
Democratic	Sammy Dalton (inc.)	11,501	21.06
Democratic	Earl Ray Tomblin (inc.)	11,439	20.94
Democratic	Charles Gilliam (inc.)	11,395	20.86
Republican	Shirley Mae Baisden	4,721	8.64
Republican	Samuel Dingess	4,043	7.40

West Virginia State Senate District 7 Democratic Primary Election, 1980
Party	Candidate	Votes	%
Democratic	Earl Ray Tomblin	12,183	57.02
Democratic	Moss Burgess	4,982	23.32
Democratic	Danny Dahill	4,200	19.66

West Virginia State Senate District 7 Election, 1980
Party	Candidate	Votes	%
Democratic	Earl Ray Tomblin	28,065	72.04
Republican	Dennis Fillinger	10,895	27.96

West Virginia State Senate District 7 Election, 1984
Party	Candidate	Votes	%
Democratic	Earl Ray Tomblin (inc.)	28,297	74.99
Republican	Emil Baldwin Sr.	9,436	25.01

West Virginia State Senate District 7 Democratic Primary Election, 1988
Party	Candidate	Votes	%
Democratic	Earl Ray Tomblin (inc.)	15,470	59.21
Democratic	Art Kirkendoll	10,659	40.79

West Virginia State Senate District 7 Election, 1988
Party	Candidate	Votes	%
Democratic	Earl Ray Tomblin (inc.)	25,840	100.00

West Virginia State Senate District 7 Election, 1992
Party	Candidate	Votes	%
Democratic	Earl Ray Tomblin (inc.)	26,198	100.00

West Virginia State Senate District 7 Democratic Primary Election, 1996
Party	Candidate	Votes	%
Democratic	Earl Ray Tomblin (inc.)	15,580	60.98
Democratic	Larry Hendricks	6,610	25.87
Democratic	Moss Burgess	3,359	13.15

West Virginia State Senate District 7 Election, 1996
Party	Candidate	Votes	%
Democratic	Earl Ray Tomblin (inc.)	25,396	81.45
Republican	Stephen Ray Smith	5,783	18.55

West Virginia State Senate District 7 Election, 2000
Party	Candidate	Votes	%
Democratic	Earl Ray Tomblin (inc.)	26,408	100.00

West Virginia State Senate District 7 Democratic Primary Election, 2004
Party	Candidate	Votes	%
Democratic	Earl Ray Tomblin (inc.)	17,194	81.30
Democratic	Bruce "Becky" Hobbs	3,955	18.70

West Virginia State Senate District 7 Election, 2004
Party	Candidate	Votes	%
Democratic	Earl Ray Tomblin (inc.)	27,147	74.48
Republican	Billy Marcum	9,300	25.52

West Virginia State Senate District 7 Election, 2008
Party	Candidate	Votes	%
Democratic	Earl Ray Tomblin (inc.)	24,010	73.15
Republican	Billy Marcum	8,813	26.85

West Virginia Gubernatorial Special Democratic Primary Election, 2011
Party	Candidate	Votes	%
Democratic	Earl Ray Tomblin	51,348	40.40
Democratic	Rick Thompson	30,631	24.10
Democratic	Natalie Tennant	22,106	17.39
Democratic	John Perdue	15,995	12.58
Democratic	Jeffrey Kessler	6,550	5.15
Democratic	Arne Moltis	481	0.38

West Virginia Gubernatorial Special Election, 2011
Party	Candidate	Votes	%
Democratic	Earl Ray Tomblin	149,202	49.55
Republican	Bill Maloney	141,656	47.05
Mountain	Bob Henry Baber	6,083	2.02
Independent	Marla Dee Ingels	2,875	0.95
American Third Position	Harry Bertram	1,111	0.37
Write-in	Phil Hudok	76	0.03
Write-in	Donald Lee Underwood	54	0.02
Write-in	John "Rick" Bartlett	27	0.01

West Virginia Gubernatorial Democratic Primary Election, 2012
Party	Candidate	Votes	%
Democratic	Earl Ray Tomblin (inc.)	170,481	84.37
Democratic	Arne Moltis	31,587	15.63

West Virginia Gubernatorial Election, 2012
Party	Candidate	Votes	%
Democratic	Earl Ray Tomblin (inc.)	335,468	50.49
Republican	Bill Maloney	303,291	45.65
Mountain	Jesse Johnson	16,787	2.53
Libertarian	David Moran	8,909	1.34

== Notes ==
Political offices
Preceded by Keith Burdette	President of the West Virginia Senate; 1995–2011	Succeeded by Jeff Kessler
New office	Lieutenant Governor of West Virginia; 2000–2011	Succeeded by Jeff Kessler
Preceded by Joe Manchin	Governor of West Virginia; 2010–2017; Acting: 2010–2011	Succeeded by Jim Justice
Party political offices
Preceded by Joe Manchin	Democratic nominee for Governor of West Virginia; 2011, 2012	Succeeded by Jim Justice
U.S. order of precedence (ceremonial)
Preceded by Bob Wise as Former Governor	Order of precedence of the United States; Within West Virginia	Succeeded by Jack Markell as Former Governor
Preceded by Bob Wise as Former Governor	Order of precedence of the United States; Outside West Virginia	Succeeded by Robert List as Former Governor
