= 1992 West Virginia gubernatorial election =

- November 3, 1992
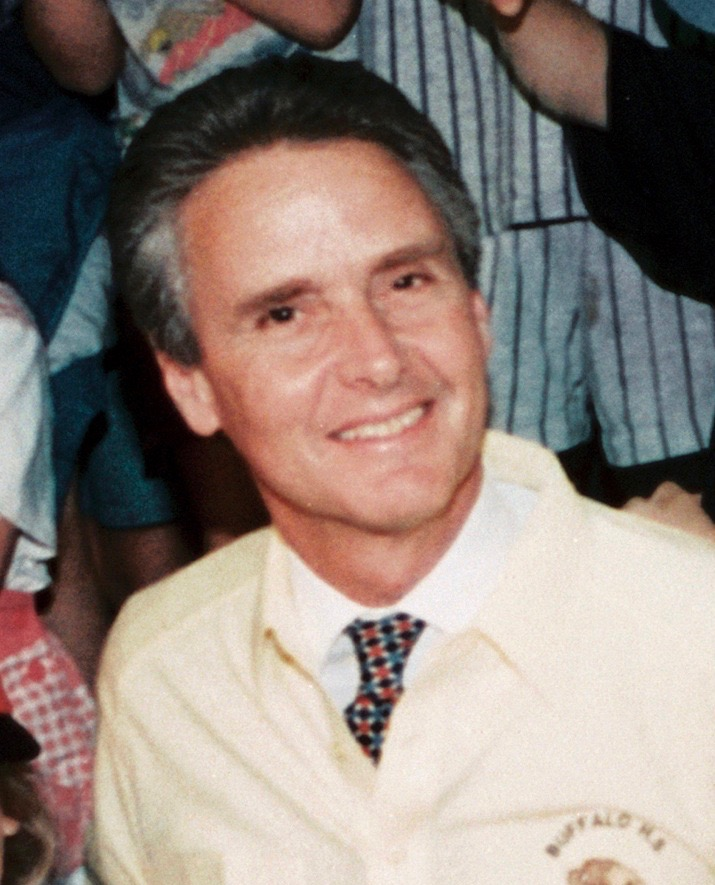

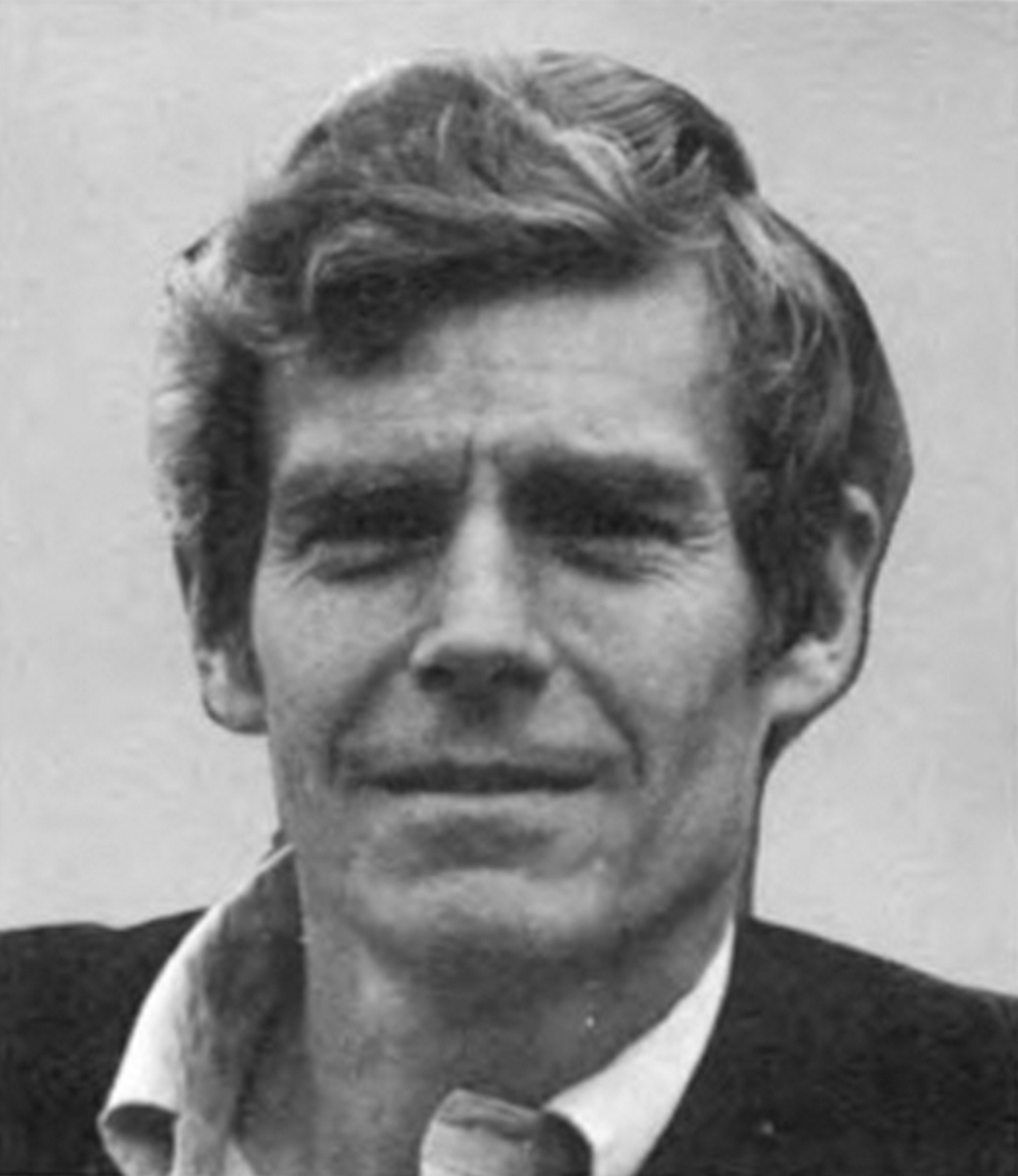

Nominee	Gaston Caperton	Cleve Benedict	Charlotte Pritt (write-in)
Party	Democratic	Republican	Independent
Popular vote	368,302	240,390	48,873
Percentage	56.01%	36.56%	7.43%
- County results Caperton: 40–50% 50–60% 60–70% 70–80% Benedict: 40–50% 50–60% 60–70%
Governor before election
Gaston Caperton
Democratic
Elected Governor
Gaston Caperton
Democratic

The 1992 West Virginia gubernatorial election took place on November 7, 1992. Incumbent Democratic governor Gaston Caperton won re-election by defeating former Republican U.S. representative Cleve Benedict and Democratic State Senator Charlotte Pritt, who ran as an independent write-in candidate after losing to Caperton in the Democratic primary. Benedict had defeated Vernon Criss for his party's nomination; this was the only election between 1964 and 2000 that the Republicans had nominated someone other than Arch A. Moore or Cecil H. Underwood. This was the last time until 2020 that West Virginia voted for the same party for governor and for president, as both elections are held concurrently in the state. This is the most recent time that Democrats won both races concurrently.

== Democratic primary ==
=== Candidates ===
- Gaston Caperton, incumbent
- Charlotte Pritt, state senator
- Mario Palumbo, incumbent attorney general
- Larry Butcher
- Rodger Belknap

West Virginia Democratic gubernatorial primary, 1992
Party	Candidate	Votes	%
Democratic	Gaston Caperton (incumbent)	142,261	42.68%
Democratic	Charlotte Pritt	115,498	34.65%
Democratic	Mario Palumbo	66,984	20.10%
Democratic	Larry Butcher	4,994	1.50%
Democratic	Rodger Belknap	3,590	1.08%
Total votes		333,327	100.00%

== General election ==
=== Results ===
West Virginia gubernatorial election, 1992
Party	Candidate	Votes	%
Democratic	Gaston Caperton (incumbent)	368,302	56.01
Republican	Cleve Benedict	240,390	36.56
Write-In	Charlotte Pritt (write-in)	48,873	7.43
Total votes		657,565	100.00
Democratic hold			

==== By county ====
County	Gaston Caperton Democratic		Cleve Benedict Republican		Charlotte Pritt Democratic write-in		Margin		Total
County	#	%	#	%	#	%	#	%	Total
Barbour	3,805	55.71%	2,699	39.52%	326	4.77%	1,106	16.19%	6,830
Berkeley	9,969	52.71%	8,605	45.50%	338	1.79%	1,364	7.21%	18,912
Boone	6,543	70.56%	2,069	22.31%	661	7.13%	4,474	48.25%	9,273
Braxton	3,316	59.17%	1,872	33.40%	416	7.42%	1,444	25.77%	5,604
Brooke	6,322	63.75%	3,190	32.17%	405	4.08%	3,132	31.58%	9,917
Cabell	18,674	57.63%	10,746	33.16%	2,984	9.21%	7,928	24.47%	32,404
Calhoun	1,464	46.80%	1,333	42.62%	331	10.58%	131	4.19%	3,128
Clay	1,814	51.10%	1,386	39.04%	350	9.86%	428	12.06%	3,550
Doddridge	1,161	39.79%	1,512	51.82%	245	8.40%	−351	−12.03%	2,918
Fayette	8,908	58.99%	4,395	29.11%	1,797	11.90%	4,513	29.89%	15,100
Gilmer	1,554	50.52%	1,250	40.64%	272	8.84%	304	9.88%	3,076
Grant	1,356	32.69%	2,739	66.03%	53	1.28%	−1,383	−33.34%	4,148
Greenbrier	5,159	44.30%	5,683	48.80%	804	6.90%	−524	−4.50%	11,646
Hampshire	2,850	47.79%	2,990	50.14%	123	2.06%	−140	−2.35%	5,963
Hancock	8,700	61.93%	4,927	35.08%	420	2.99%	3,773	26.86%	14,047
Hardy	2,456	54.18%	2,032	44.83%	45	0.99%	424	9.35%	4,533
Harrison	18,335	62.55%	8,195	27.96%	2,784	9.50%	10,140	34.59%	29,314
Jackson	5,307	48.56%	4,559	41.72%	1,062	9.72%	748	6.84%	10,928
Jefferson	6,391	55.69%	4,887	42.59%	197	1.72%	1,504	13.11%	11,475
Kanawha	40,285	51.16%	29,802	37.84%	8,661	11.00%	10,483	13.31%	78,748
Lewis	4,009	62.18%	2,175	33.74%	263	4.08%	1,834	28.45%	6,447
Lincoln	4,158	53.96%	2,857	37.08%	691	8.97%	1,301	16.88%	7,706
Logan	10,460	68.73%	3,378	22.19%	1,382	9.08%	7,082	46.53%	15,220
Marion	15,989	64.84%	6,098	24.73%	2,572	10.43%	9,891	40.11%	24,659
Marshall	8,299	57.32%	5,459	37.71%	720	4.97%	2,840	19.62%	14,478
Mason	6,040	55.52%	3,445	31.67%	1,393	12.81%	2,595	23.86%	10,878
McDowell	7,227	77.83%	1,685	18.15%	374	4.03%	5,542	59.68%	9,286
Mercer	10,925	56.81%	6,952	36.15%	1,354	7.04%	3,973	20.66%	19,231
Mineral	5,278	49.98%	5,241	49.63%	41	0.39%	37	0.35%	10,560
Mingo	7,823	75.55%	2,257	21.80%	275	2.66%	5,566	53.75%	10,355
Monongalia	17,365	62.22%	8,535	30.58%	2,011	7.21%	8,830	31.64%	27,911
Monroe	2,590	48.93%	2,456	46.40%	247	4.67%	134	2.53%	5,293
Morgan	2,166	41.95%	2,867	55.53%	130	2.52%	−701	−13.58%	5,163
Nicholas	4,812	52.61%	3,271	35.76%	1,064	11.63%	1,541	16.85%	9,147
Ohio	12,148	60.37%	7,196	35.76%	777	3.86%	4,952	24.61%	20,121
Pendleton	1,834	52.75%	1,610	46.30%	33	0.95%	224	6.44%	3,477
Pleasants	1,580	48.41%	1,481	45.37%	203	6.22%	99	3.03%	3,264
Pocahontas	1,535	41.53%	1,806	48.86%	355	9.60%	−271	−7.33%	3,696
Preston	4,995	48.82%	4,866	47.56%	371	3.63%	129	1.26%	10,232
Putnam	7,567	44.69%	7,538	44.52%	1,827	10.79%	29	0.17%	16,932
Raleigh	12,840	54.40%	8,281	35.08%	2,484	10.52%	4,559	19.31%	23,605
Randolph	5,908	59.99%	3,583	36.38%	357	3.63%	2,325	23.61%	9,848
Ritchie	1,784	41.68%	2,122	49.58%	374	8.74%	−338	−7.90%	4,280
Roane	2,568	46.11%	2,305	41.39%	696	12.50%	263	4.72%	5,569
Summers	2,504	54.40%	1,727	37.52%	372	8.08%	777	16.88%	4,603
Taylor	3,477	57.24%	2,275	37.45%	322	5.30%	1,202	19.79%	6,074
Tucker	1,959	55.31%	1,460	41.22%	123	3.47%	499	14.09%	3,542
Tyler	2,108	51.28%	1,735	42.20%	268	6.52%	373	9.07%	4,111
Upshur	3,904	48.46%	3,677	45.64%	475	5.90%	227	2.82%	8,056
Wayne	8,959	58.51%	5,256	34.33%	1,097	7.16%	3,703	24.18%	15,312
Webster	2,081	59.53%	1,005	28.75%	410	11.73%	1,076	30.78%	3,496
Wetzel	4,622	62.81%	2,489	33.82%	248	3.37%	2,133	28.98%	7,359
Wirt	1,202	52.19%	909	39.47%	192	8.34%	293	12.72%	2,303
Wood	17,781	51.53%	14,834	42.99%	1,888	5.47%	2,947	8.54%	34,503
Wyoming	5,436	58.24%	2,688	28.80%	1,210	12.96%	2,748	29.44%	9,334
Totals	368,302	56.01%	240,390	36.56%	48,873	7.43%	127,912	19.45%	657,565

Counties that flipped from Democratic to Republican

- Greenbrier
- Hampshire
- Pocahontas

Counties that flipped from Republican to Democratic

- Jackson
- Marshall
- Ohio
- Randolph
- Roane
- Tyler
- Tucker
- Upshur

== See also ==
Source:
