= Spring Hill Cemetery Historic District =

Historic district in West Virginia, United States

- U.S. National Register of Historic Places
- U.S. Historic district
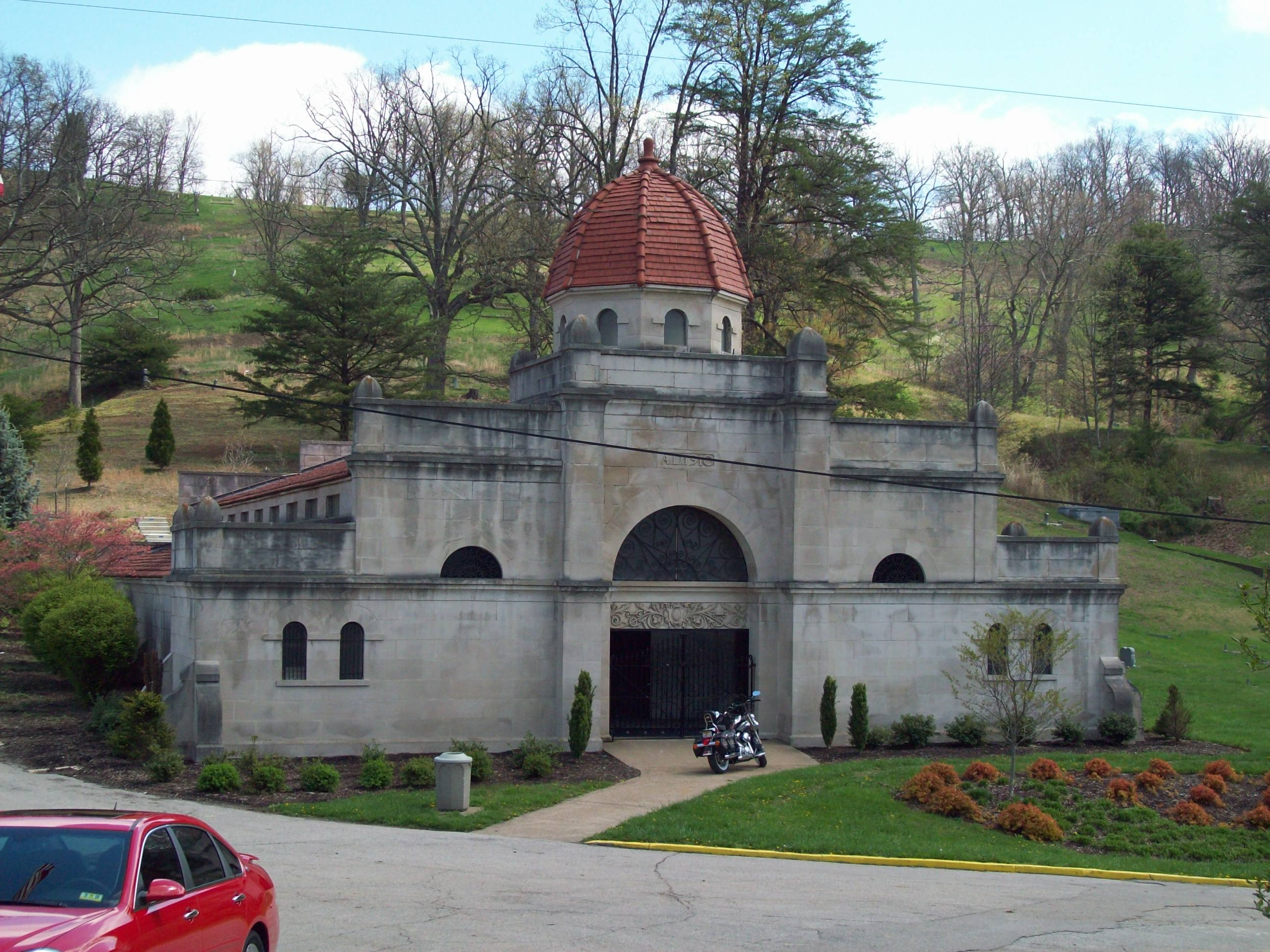
- Spring Hill Mausoleum, April 2009

- Location within West Virginia Location within the United States
- Location: 1554 Farnsworth Dr., Charleston, West Virginia
- Coordinates: 38°21′11″N 81°36′57″W
- Built: 1869
- Architect: Vosburgh, A.J.
- Architectural style: Moorish
- NRHP reference No.: 85003360
- Added to NRHP: October 18, 1985

Spring Hill Cemetery Historic District is a national historic district located at Charleston, West Virginia, United States. The district is a 172-acre (70 ha) site located on a series of tree shaded and landscaped hills overlooking central Charleston and includes the following cemeteries: Spring Hill Cemetery (established 1869), Mountain View Cemetery, B'nai Israel Cemetery, Lowenstein Cemetery, and Mount Olivet Cemetery. It is West Virginia's largest cemetery complex. The district features Spring Hill Mausoleum, a stone faced reinforced concrete structure constructed in 1910. Notable graves throughout the cemetery include the following:

- George W. Atkinson, 10th Governor of West Virginia
- Samuel B. Avis, Member of the United States House of Representatives from 1913 to 1915
- Joseph H. Gaines, Member of the United States House of Representatives from 1901 to 1911
- James Hall Huling, Member of the United States House of Representatives from 1895 to 1897
- Adam Brown Littlepage, Member of the United States House of Representatives from 1911 to 1913, 1915 to 1917 and 1917 to 1919
- William A. MacCorkle, 9th Governor of West Virginia
- Samuel Augustine Miller, Representative for Virginia in Confederate States Congress
- Charles P. Snyder, Member of the United States House of Representatives from 1883 to 1889
- George W. Summers, Representative for Virginia in the United States House of Representatives from 1841 to 1843 and 1843 to 1845, also Whig nominee for Governor in the 1851 election
- Emanuel Willis Wilson, 7th Governor of West Virginia

It was listed on the National Register of Historic Places in 1985.

== Gallery ==
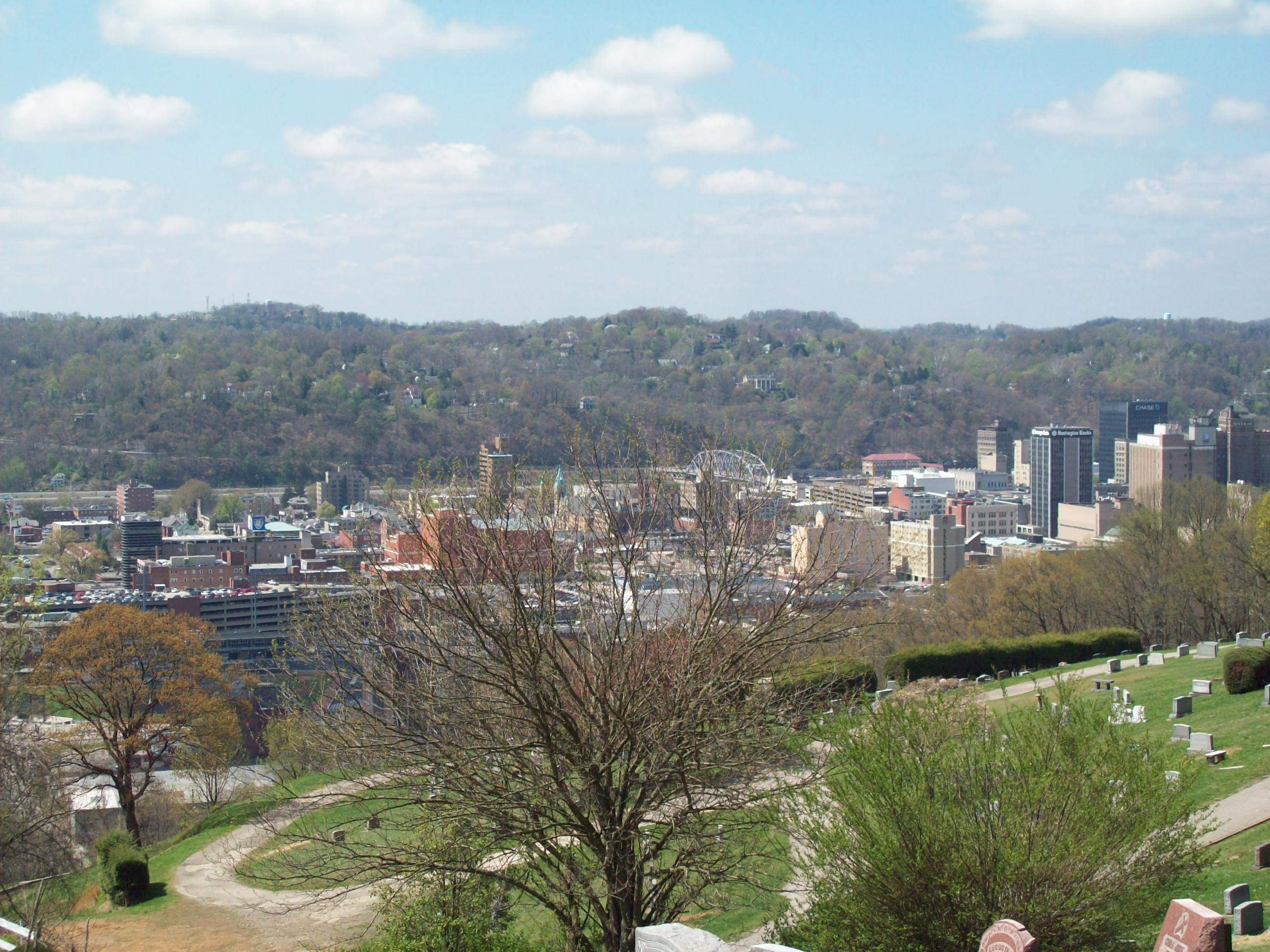
Spring Hill View of Downtown Charleston, April 2009
