= Emmett William Price =

American veterinarian and parasitologist

- Born: 29 January 1896; Clover Lick, West Virginia, U.S.
- Died: 9 December 1965 (aged 69); Gadsden, Alabama, U.S.
- Education: George Washington University; American University
- Known for: Research on trematodes
- Scientific career
- Fields: Veterinary medicine, Helminthology, Parasitology
- Workplaces: United States Department of Agriculture; Jacksonville State College

Emmett William Price (29 January 1896 – 9 December 1965) was an American veterinarian, helminthologist and parasitologist. His principal research interest was trematodes (flukes). Twenty-two species and the genus Pricetrema were named in his honour.

== Biography ==
Price moved to Washington, D.C., in 1896. In 1918, at the age of 20, he obtained his Doctor of Veterinary Medicine degree from George Washington University. After a brief period of service in the Army Veterinary Corps, he worked from 1919 to 1926 as an assistant in pathology at the School of Veterinary Medicine of Texas A&M College. During this period, he developed an interest in parasitology. When Maurice Crowther Hall, then head of the Zoological Division of the Bureau of Animal Industry at the United States Department of Agriculture, visited the university, he noticed Price and invited him to apply for a position in his division.

Price joined the Bureau of Animal Industry in 1926 while continuing his academic education. He received a Master of Science degree from American University in 1931 and a PhD from George Washington University in 1935. He soon became recognised as an expert in parasitic worm diseases in animals. In 1936, he was appointed deputy chief of the Zoological Division. When the laboratory was relocated to the Agricultural Research Center in Beltsville, Maryland, he became responsible for the facility. Following an organisational restructuring in the early 1950s, he became Agricultural Administrator of the Helminth Parasite Section of the Animal Disease and Parasite Research Division of the Department of Agriculture.

Due to declining health, Price retired in 1956. He subsequently moved with his wife to Gadsden, Alabama, to live near a married daughter. Following a difficult operation, his health improved, and he accepted a position at Jacksonville State College. There he taught bacteriology, histology and parasitology until his second retirement in 1965.

Price authored more than 150 scientific publications. His principal contribution to the taxonomy of North American trematodes consisted of eleven review papers published between 1937 and 1962. He had been a member of the Helminthological Society of Washington since 1926 and was elected its president in 1952. From 1942 to 1947, he served on the Research Council for Parasitology of the American Veterinary Medical Association. In Alabama, he was appointed to the State Board of Medical Examiners and elected an honorary member of the Alabama Academy of Sciences.
