= West Virginia's 3rd congressional district =

1863–2023 US congressional district

Coordinates: 37°59′28″N 81°13′06″W

- Obsolete district
- Created: 1863
- Eliminated: 2020
- Years active: 1863–2023

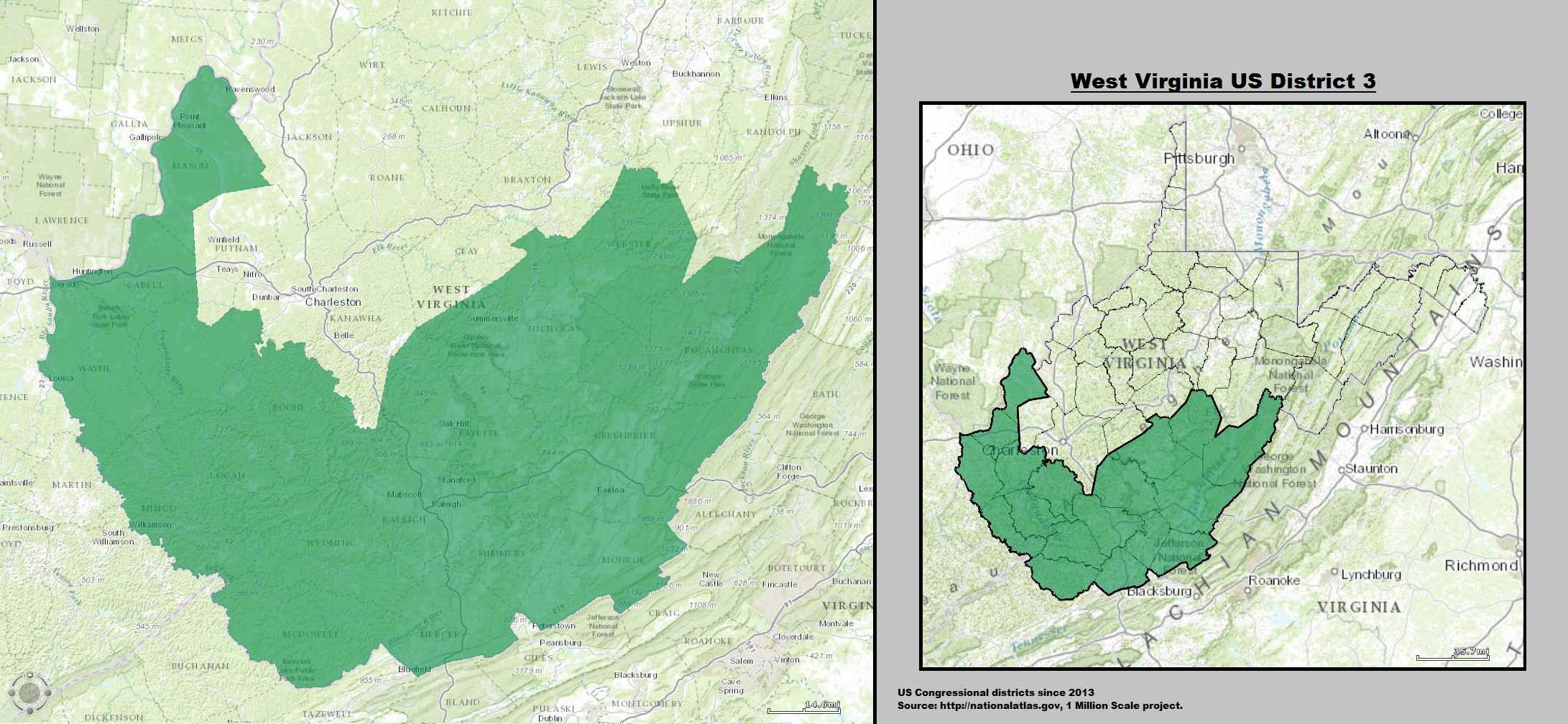
The district in its final form, from 2013 to 2023

West Virginia's 3rd congressional district is an obsolete U.S. congressional district in southern West Virginia. At various times the district covered different parts of the state, but in its final form included the state's second-largest city, Huntington; included Bluefield, Princeton, and Beckley; and has a long history of coal mining (especially in the southwestern counties), forestry, and farming.

The district was last represented by Republican Carol Miller. However, because West Virginia lost a congressional seat in the 2020 census, it was eliminated in 2023. On October 22, 2021, Governor Jim Justice signed the new congressional map into law. Under the plan, the old 3rd essentially became the new 1st. Incumbent representative Miller transferred to the new 1st district.

== Character ==
The district grew in geographic size over the years, as it contained the area of the state that lost the most population. Most of the congressmen listed below prior to the 1992 election cycle actually represented other parts of the state, as most of the recent 3rd district's history was found in the also obsolete 4th, 5th, and 6th districts.

The last version of the 3rd district began to take shape in the 1960s. For much of its history, the 4th district had been focused on Huntington and the mill towns and farm communities north of that city along the Ohio River, while the 5th and 6th districts were focused on the then safely Democratic coal fields. In the 1970 redistricting, the 5th (which had absorbed most of the 6th due to population loss 10 years earlier) was eliminated, and most of its territory was merged into the 4th to form what is now the western half of the 3rd. In the 1990 redistricting the old 4th was renumbered as the 3rd and took in what is now the eastern half of its current shape from a previous version of the 2nd district.

The major areas of the last version of the district included the industrial and university city of Huntington, the coal producing southwestern part of the state, and the more conservative farm and timber region of the southeastern part of the state. 2010 census figures again showed a major population loss, and Mason County was transferred from the 2nd to the 3rd district. This did not change the character of the district in a significant way.

Despite the strength of Democrats at the local and state level, in presidential elections the district followed the increasing Republican trend in West Virginia. While Bill Clinton twice carried the district handily in three-way races, Al Gore had just narrowly won the district in 2000 with 51% of the vote. George W. Bush won the district in 2004 with 53% of the vote, and John McCain carried the district in 2008 with 55.76% of the vote, continuing the district, and the state's rightward shift despite a large shift towards the Democrats nationally in 2008. In 2012, the district shifted significantly towards the Republicans yet again, with Republican Mitt Romney defeating President Barack Obama 65.0% to 32.8% in the district. In 2016, the district shifted even further towards the Republican Party, with Republican Donald Trump defeating Democrat Hillary Clinton (wife of Bill Clinton, who carried the district by significant margins in the 1992 and 1996 presidential elections), by a massive margin of 72.5% to 23.3%.

== Obsolete ==
The district became obsolete following the 2020 United States census.

== Election results from statewide races ==
Year	Office	Results
2008	President	McCain 55% - 42%
2012	President	Romney 65% - 33%
2012	Senate	Manchin 65% - 32%
2012	Governor	Ray Tomblin 54% - 42%
2012	Attorney General	McGraw 53% - 47%
2012	Auditor	Gainer III 61% - 39%
2012	Secretary of State	Tennant 64% - 36%
2012	Treasurer	Perdue 59% - 41%
2014	Senate	Moore Capito 61% - 36%
2016	President	Trump 73% - 23%
2016	Governor	Justice 55% - 38%
2016	Attorney General	Morrisey 49% - 46%
2018	Senate	Manchin 49% - 47%
2020	President	Trump 73% - 25%
2020	Senate	Moore Capito 73% - 25%
2020	Governor	Justice 68% - 27%
2020	Attorney General	Morrisey 65% - 35%
2020	Auditor	McCuskey 69% - 31%
2020	Secretary of State	Warner 61% - 39%
2020	Treasurer	Moore 55% - 45%

== History ==
The third district, as originally formed in 1863, included Kanawha, Jackson, Mason, Putnam, Cabell, Clay, Wayne, Logan, Boone, Braxton, Nicholas, Roane and McDowell counties. It was essentially the successor of Virginia's 12th congressional district.

In 1882, the district was reformed to include Logan, Wyoming, McDowell, Mercer, Raleigh, Boone, Kanawha, Fayette, Clay, Nicholas, Greenbrier, Monroe, Summers, Webster, Pocahontas, and Upshur counties. In 1902, Logan, Wyoming, McDowell, Raleigh, Boone and Mercer were removed. In 1916 the district was, more or less, renumbered as the new 6th district, and the 3rd was totally reconstituted as Ritchie, Doddridge, Harrison, Calhoun, Gilmer, Lewis, Upshur, Braxton, Clay, Nicholas, and Webster counties. In 1934, Fayette was added. In 1952, Wirt was added. In 1962, the district was again totally broken up and reconstituted as Boone, Clay, Kanawha, Nicholas and Raleigh. In 1972, Raleigh was removed and Ritchie, Wirt, Gilmer, Calhoun, Mason, Jackson, Roane, Braxton, Putnam, Lincoln, and Boone were added. In 1982, Lewis was added.

The district's last configuration dated from the 1990 round of redistricting. From 1992 to 2002, it consisted of Boone, Cabell, Fayette, Greenbrier, Lincoln, Logan, McDowell, Mercer, Mingo, Monroe, Pocahontas, Raleigh, Summers, Wayne, Webster, and Wyoming. In 2002, Nicholas was added. For the 2012 cycle, Mason was added. All of the counties of the last version of the district are now part of the 1st District.

== List of members representing the district ==
Member	Party	Years	Cong ress	Electoral history
District established December 7, 1863
Kellian Whaley (Point Pleasant)	Union	December 7, 1863 – March 3, 1867	38th 39th	Elected in 1863. Re-elected in 1864. Retired.
Daniel Polsley (Point Pleasant)	Republican	March 4, 1867 – March 3, 1869	40th	Elected in 1866. Retired.
John Witcher (Guyandotte)	Republican	March 4, 1869 – March 3, 1871	41st	Elected in 1868. Lost re-election.
Frank Hereford (Union)	Democratic	March 4, 1871 – January 31, 1877	42nd 43rd 44th	Elected in 1870. Re-elected in 1872. Re-elected in 1874. Retired to run for U.S. Senator and resigned when elected.
Vacant		January 31, 1877 – March 3, 1877	44th	
John E. Kenna (Kanawha)	Democratic	March 4, 1877 – March 3, 1883	45th 46th 47th	Elected in 1876. Re-elected in 1878. Re-elected in 1880. Re-elected in 1882, but resigned when elected U.S. Senator.
Vacant		March 4, 1883 – May 15, 1883	48th	
Charles P. Snyder (Charleston)	Democratic	May 15, 1883 – March 3, 1889	48th 49th 50th	Elected to finish Kenna's term. Re-elected in 1884. Re-elected in 1886. Retired.
John D. Alderson (Nicholas)	Democratic	March 4, 1889 – March 3, 1895	51st 52nd 53rd	Elected in 1888. Re-elected in 1890. Re-elected in 1892. Lost re-election.
James Hall Huling (Charleston)	Republican	March 4, 1895 – March 3, 1897	54th	Elected in 1894. Retired.
Charles Dorr (Addison)	Republican	March 4, 1897 – March 3, 1899	55th	Elected in 1896. Retired.
David Emmons Johnston (Bluefield)	Democratic	March 4, 1899 – March 3, 1901	56th	Elected in 1898. Lost re-election.
Joseph H. Gaines (Charleston)	Republican	March 4, 1901 – March 3, 1911	57th 58th 59th 60th 61st	Elected in 1900. Re-elected in 1902. Re-elected in 1904. Re-elected in 1906. Re-elected in 1908. Lost re-election.
Adam Brown Littlepage (Charleston)	Democratic	March 4, 1911 – March 3, 1913	62nd	Elected in 1910. Lost re-election.
Samuel B. Avis (Charleston)	Republican	March 4, 1913 – March 3, 1915	63rd	Elected in 1912. Lost re-election.
Adam Brown Littlepage (Charleston)	Democratic	March 4, 1915 – March 3, 1917	64th	Elected in 1914. Redistricted to the 6th district.
Stuart F. Reed (Clarksburg)	Republican	March 4, 1917 – March 3, 1925	65th 66th 67th 68th	Elected in 1916. Re-elected in 1918. Re-elected in 1920. Re-elected in 1922. Retired.
John M. Wolverton (Richwood)	Republican	March 4, 1925 – March 3, 1927	69th	Elected in 1924. Lost re-election.
William S. O'Brien (Buckhannon)	Democratic	March 4, 1927 – March 3, 1929	70th	Elected in 1926. Lost re-election.
John M. Wolverton (Richwood)	Republican	March 4, 1929 – March 3, 1931	71st	Elected in 1928. Lost re-election.
Lynn Hornor (Clarksburg)	Democratic	March 4, 1931 – September 23, 1933	72nd 73rd	Elected in 1930. Re-elected in 1932. Died.
Vacant		September 23, 1933 – November 28, 1933	73rd	
Andrew Edmiston Jr. (Weston)	Democratic	November 28, 1933 – January 3, 1943	73rd 74th 75th 76th 77th	Elected to finish Hornor's term. Re-elected in 1934. Re-elected in 1936. Re-elected in 1938. Re-elected in 1940. Lost re-election.
Edward G. Rohrbough (Glenville)	Republican	January 3, 1943 – January 3, 1945	78th	Elected in 1942. Lost re-election.
Cleveland M. Bailey (Clarksburg)	Democratic	January 3, 1945 – January 3, 1947	79th	Elected in 1944. Lost re-election.
Edward G. Rohrbough (Glenville)	Republican	January 3, 1947 – January 3, 1949	80th	Elected in 1946. Lost re-election.
Cleveland M. Bailey (Clarksburg)	Democratic	January 3, 1949 – January 3, 1963	81st 82nd 83rd 84th 85th 86th 87th	Elected in 1948. Re-elected in 1950. Re-elected in 1952. Re-elected in 1954. Re-elected in 1956. Re-elected in 1958. Re-elected in 1960. Redistricted to the 1st district and lost re-election.
John M. Slack Jr. (Charleston)	Democratic	January 3, 1963 – March 17, 1980	88th 89th 90th 91st 92nd 93rd 94th 95th 96th	Redistricted from the 6th district and re-elected in 1962. Re-elected in 1964. Re-elected in 1966. Re-elected in 1968. Re-elected in 1970. Re-elected in 1972. Re-elected in 1974. Re-elected in 1976. Re-elected in 1978. Died.
Vacant		March 17, 1980 – June 30, 1980	96th	
John G. Hutchinson (Charleston)	Democratic	June 30, 1980 – January 3, 1981	96th	Elected to finish Slack's term. Lost re-election.
Mick Staton (South Charleston)	Republican	January 3, 1981 – January 3, 1983	97th	Elected in 1980. Lost re-election.
Bob Wise (Clendenin)	Democratic	January 3, 1983 – January 3, 1993	98th 99th 100th 101st 102nd	Elected in 1982. Re-elected in 1984. Re-elected in 1986. Re-elected in 1988. Re-elected in 1990. Redistricted to the 2nd district.
Nick Rahall (Beckley)	Democratic	January 3, 1993 – January 3, 2015	103rd 104th 105th 106th 107th 108th 109th 110th 111th 112th 113th	Redistricted from the 4th district and re-elected in 1992. Re-elected in 1994. Re-elected in 1996. Re-elected in 1998. Re-elected in 2000. Re-elected in 2002. Re-elected in 2004. Re-elected in 2006. Re-elected in 2008. Re-elected in 2010. Re-elected in 2012. Lost re-election.
Evan Jenkins (Huntington)	Republican	January 3, 2015 – September 30, 2018	114th 115th	Elected in 2014. Re-elected in 2016. Resigned to become Justice of the Supreme Court of Appeals of West Virginia.
Vacant		September 30, 2018 – January 3, 2019	115th	
Carol Miller (Huntington)	Republican	January 3, 2019 – January 3, 2023	116th 117th	Elected in 2018. Re-elected in 2020. Redistricted to the 1st district.
District dissolved January 3, 2023

== Recent election results ==
=== 2000s ===
2000 West Virginia's 3rd congressional district election
Party	Candidate	Votes	%
Democratic	Nick Rahall (incumbent)	146,807	91.3
Libertarian	Jeff Robinson	13,979	8.7
Total votes		160,786	100.00

2002 West Virginia's 3rd congressional district election
Party	Candidate	Votes	%
Democratic	Nick Rahall (incumbent)	87,783	70.2
Republican	Paul Chapman	37,229	29.8
Total votes		125,012	100.00

2004 West Virginia's 3rd congressional district election
Party	Candidate	Votes	%
Democratic	Nick Rahall (incumbent)	142,682	65.2
Republican	Rick Snuffer	76,170	34.8
Total votes		218,852	100.00

2006 West Virginia's 3rd congressional district election
Party	Candidate	Votes	%
Democratic	Nick Rahall (incumbent)	92,413	69.4
Republican	Kim Wolfe	40,820	30.6
Total votes		133,233	100.00

2008 West Virginia's 3rd congressional district election
Party	Candidate	Votes	%
Democratic	Nick Rahall (incumbent)	133,522	66.9
Republican	Marty Gearheart	66,005	33.1
Total votes		199,527	100.00

=== 2010s ===
2010 West Virginia's 3rd congressional district election
Party	Candidate	Votes	%
Democratic	Nick Rahall (incumbent)	83,636	56.0
Republican	Elliott Maynard	65,611	44.0
Total votes		149,247	100.00

West Virginia's 3rd congressional district, 2012
Party	Candidate	Votes	%
Democratic	Nick Rahall (incumbent)	108,199	53.9
Republican	Rick Snuffer	92,238	46.1
Total votes		200,437	100.0
Democratic hold			

West Virginia's 3rd congressional district, 2014
Party	Candidate	Votes	%
Republican	Evan Jenkins	77,713	55.3
Democratic	Nick Rahall (incumbent)	62,688	44.7
Total votes		140,401	100.0
Republican gain from Democratic			

West Virginia's 3rd congressional district, 2016
Party	Candidate	Votes	%
Republican	Evan Jenkins (incumbent)	140,741	67.9
Democratic	Matt Detch	49,708	24.0
Libertarian	Zane Lawhorn	16,883	8.1
Total votes		207,332	100.0
Republican hold			

West Virginia's 3rd congressional district, 2018
Party	Candidate	Votes	%
Republican	Carol Miller	98,645	56.4
Democratic	Richard Ojeda	76,340	43.6
Total votes		174,985	100.0
Republican hold			

=== 2020s ===
West Virginia's 3rd congressional district, 2020
Party	Candidate	Votes	%
Republican	Carol Miller (incumbent)	161,585	71.3
Democratic	Hilary Turner	64,927	28.7
Total votes		226,512	100.0
Republican hold			

== Historical district boundaries ==
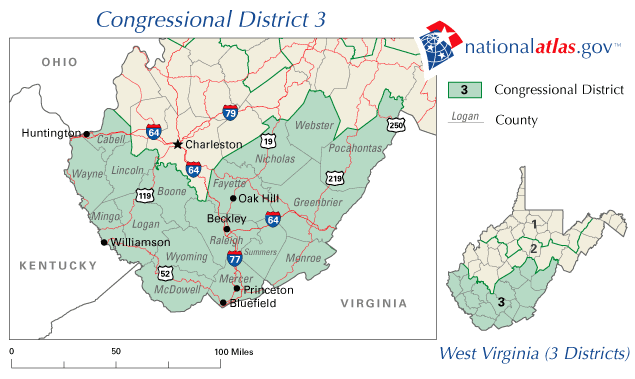
2003 - 2013

== See also ==
- West Virginia's congressional districts
- List of United States congressional districts
