= Edward G. Rohrbough =

American educator and politician

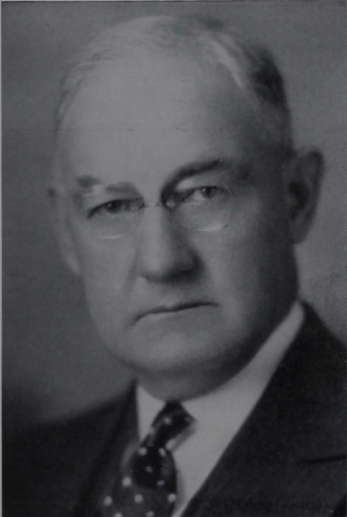
- E. G. Rohrbough in 1942

Member of the U.S. House of Representatives from West Virginia's 3rd district
- In office January 3, 1943 – January 3, 1945
- Preceded by: Andrew Edmiston, Jr.
- Succeeded by: Cleveland M. Bailey
- In office January 3, 1947 – January 3, 1949
- Preceded by: Cleveland M. Bailey
- Succeeded by: Cleveland M. Bailey

Vice President of Fairmont State University
- In office 1907–1908

President of Glenville State University
- In office 1908–1942

Personal details
- Born: January 4, 1874 Upshur County, West Virginia, US
- Died: December 12, 1956 (aged 82) Washington, D.C., US
- Party: Republican

Edward Gay Rohrbough (January 4, 1874 – December 12, 1956) was a Republican United States representative from West Virginia. He was born in 1874, near Buckhannon, West Virginia, in Upshur County, West Virginia. He served in the Seventy-eighth and Eightieth Congress. He died December 12, 1956.

He attended the public schools and West Virginia Wesleyan College at Buckhannon. He graduated from Allegheny College in Meadville, Pennsylvania, in 1900 and from Harvard University in 1906. He later studied at the University of Chicago, instructed at West Virginia Wesleyan College and instructed at West Virginia University at Morgantown, West Virginia. In 1900 and 1901 he taught school in Brookville, Pennsylvania, and at Glenville State Normal School from 1901 to 1907. He served as vice president of Fairmont State Teachers College in 1907 and 1908 and president of Glenville State Teachers College from 1908 to 1942. In 1908, he dually served as Glenville's first head football coach, compiling a 1–1–0 record.

He was elected to Congress in 1942. He was an unsuccessful candidate for re-election in 1944 but was again elected in 1946. His candidacy for re-election in 1948 was not successful. He died in Washington, D.C., on December 12, 1956, and was buried in Stalnaker Cemetery in Glenville, West Virginia.

== Head coaching record ==
Year	Team	Overall	Conference	Standing	Bowl/playoffs
Glenville State Pioneers (Independent) (1908)
1908	Glenville State	1–1			
Glenville State:		1–1			
Total:		1–1			

== See also ==
- West Virginia's congressional delegations
- List of presidents and principals of Glenville State University

U.S. House of Representatives
Preceded by Andrew Edmiston, Jr.	Member of the U.S. House of Representatives from West Virginia's 3rd congressional district 1943–1945	Succeeded by Cleveland M. Bailey
Preceded by Cleveland M. Bailey	Member of the U.S. House of Representatives from West Virginia's 3rd congressional district 1947–1949	Succeeded by Cleveland M. Bailey
