= Charles Dorr =

American politician

Charles P. Dorr
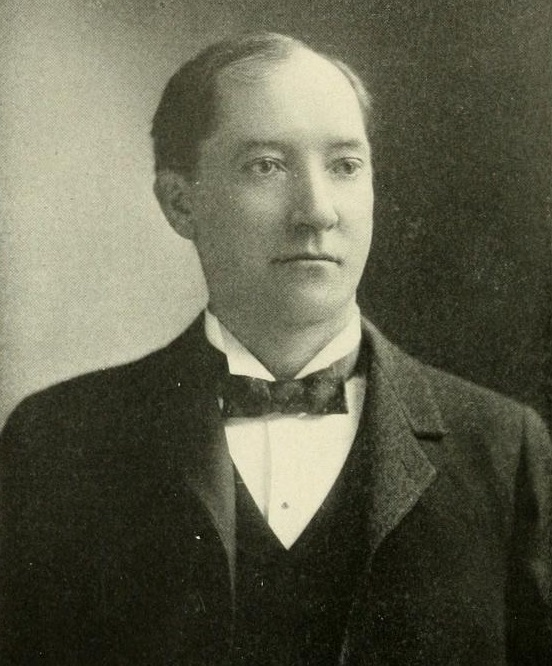
- From Volume 1 (1899) of Autobiographies and Portraits of the President, Cabinet, Supreme Court and Fifty-fifth Congress

Member of the U.S. House of Representatives from West Virginia's 3rd district
- In office March 4, 1897 – March 3, 1899
- Preceded by: James Hall Huling
- Succeeded by: David Emmons Johnston

Personal details
- Born: Charles Phillips Dorr; August 12, 1852 Miltonburg, Ohio
- Died: October 8, 1914 (aged 62) Clover Lick, West Virginia
- Resting place: Clover Lick Cemetery, Clover Lick, West Virginia
- Party: Republican
- Profession: Attorney

Charles Phillips Dorr (August 12, 1852 – October 8, 1914) was a lawyer and Republican politician from West Virginia who served as a United States representative in the 55th United States Congress. Dorr was born in Miltonsburg, Ohio, in Monroe County.

Dorr moved with his parents to Woodsfield, Ohio, in 1866. He taught school in Ohio and West Virginia. After studying law, he was admitted to the bar in 1874 and began practicing in West Virginia that year. He was a member of the Webster Springs, West Virginia town council. He won election to the fourth delegate district of the West Virginia House of Delegates in 1884 and 1888. In 1887 he was made Sergeant at Arms. He won election in 1896 to the Fifty-fifth Congress (March 4, 1897 – March 3, 1899). He was not a candidate for renomination in 1898 and resumed his legal practice at Webster Springs, West Virginia. He died on his estate at Clover Lick, West Virginia, in Pocahontas County on October 8, 1914. He was buried at Clover Lick Cemetery.

== See also ==
- West Virginia's congressional delegations

== Sources ==
United States Congress. "DORR, Charles Phillips (id: D000436)". Biographical Directory of the United States Congress. Online. September 11, 2007.

U.S. House of Representatives
Preceded by James Hall Huling	Member of the U.S. House of Representatives from West Virginia's 3rd congressional district 1897–1899	Succeeded by David Emmons Johnston
