= David Emmons Johnston =

American politician

David Johnston
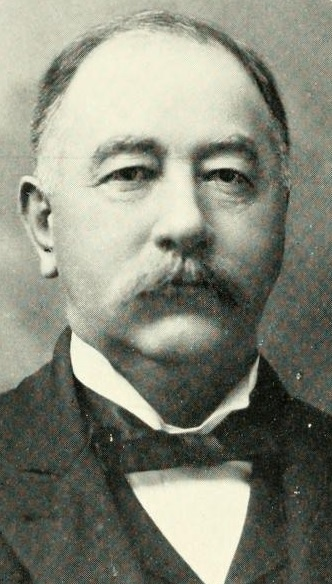

Member of the U.S. House of Representatives from West Virginia's 3rd district
- In office March 4, 1899 – March 3, 1901
- Preceded by: Charles P. Dorr
- Succeeded by: Joseph H. Gaines

Member of the West Virginia Senate
- In office 1878

Personal details
- Born: David Emmons Johnston; April 10, 1845 Pearisburg, Virginia, U.S.
- Died: July 7, 1917 (aged 72) Portland, Oregon, U.S.
- Party: Democratic

Military service
- Branch/service: Confederate Army
- Unit: 7th Virginia Infantry Regiment

David Emmons Johnston (April 10, 1845 – July 7, 1917) was an American lawyer and Democratic politician from West Virginia who served as a member of the United States House of Representatives from 1899 to 1901.

== Early life ==
Johnston was born in Pearisburg, Virginia on April 10, 1845.

== Career ==
In April 1861, he enlisted in the Confederate Army and served four years in the 7th Virginia Infantry Regiment, Kemper's brigade of Pickett’s division. He studied law and was admitted to the bar in Giles County in 1867. He began practicing in Pearisburg, Virginia. He moved to Mercer County, West Virginia, in 1870.

Johnston served as prosecuting attorney from 1872 to 1876. He served as a member of the West Virginia Senate in 1878 but soon resigned. From 1880 to 1888, he was a judge on the Ninth Judicial Circuit Court. He was elected as a Democrat to the Fifty-sixth Congress (March 4, 1899 – March 3, 1901). His candidacy in 1900 for re-election was unsuccessful.

He moved to Portland, Oregon, in 1908 and resumed the practice of law.

== Personal life ==
He died at his home in Portland on July 7, 1917, and was buried in Mount Scott Park Cemetery, which is now Lincoln Memorial Park Cemetery.

== Works ==
- A History of Middle New River Settlements and Contiguous Territory (1906)
- The Story of a Confederate Boy in the Civil War (1914)

== See also ==
- West Virginia's congressional delegations

== Sources ==
- United States Congress. "David Emmons Johnston (id: J000186)". Biographical Directory of the United States Congress. September 2007.

U.S. House of Representatives
Preceded by Charles P. Dorr	Member of the U.S. House of Representatives from West Virginia's 3rd congressional district 1899–1901	Succeeded by Joseph H. Gaines
