= Charles P. Snyder (politician) =

American politician (1847–1915)

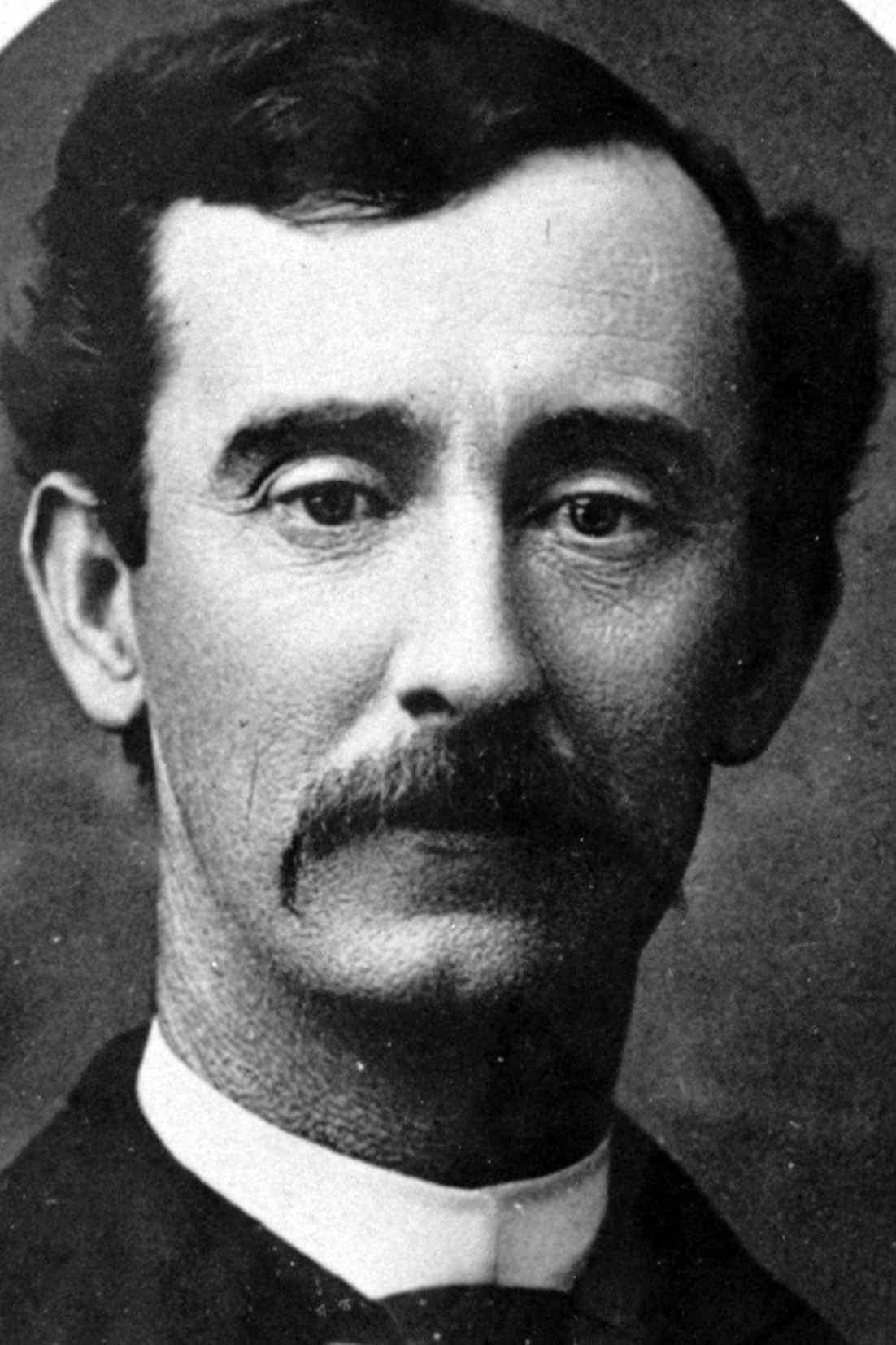

Member of the U.S. House of Representatives from West Virginia's 4th district
- In office May 15, 1883 – March 3, 1889
- Preceded by: John E. Kenna
- Succeeded by: John D. Alderson

Judge for the Kanawha County Criminal Court
- In office 1890–1896

Consul to Mexico
- In office 1897–1901

Personal details
- Born: Charles Philip Snyder; June 9, 1847 Charleston, Virginia
- Died: August 13, 1915 (aged 68) Vineland, New Jersey
- Resting place: Spring Hill Cemetery, Charleston, West Virginia
- Party: Democratic Party
- Occupation: Attorney, judge, diplomat

Charles Philip Snyder (June 9, 1847 – August 21, 1915) was an American lawyer, judge and Democratic politician from West Virginia, who represented West Virginia's 3rd congressional district during the 48th, 49th, and 50th United States Congresses.

== Early and family life ==
He was born on June 9, 1847, in Charleston in Kanawha County, which was then in Virginia.

== Career ==
After studying law, he was admitted to the bar and opened a practice. He became prosecuting attorney of Kanawha County and served from 1876 to 1884. He was elected in 1882 to the Forty-eighth Congress to fill the vacancy caused by the resignation of John E. Kenna. He won re-election to the Forty-ninth and Fiftieth Congresses and served from May 15, 1883, to March 3, 1889. He served as a judge on the criminal court of Kanawha County from 1890 to 1896, and as United States consul to Ciudad Porfirio Diaz (now Piedras Negras), Mexico, from 1897 to 1901.

== Death and legacy ==
He died in Vineland, Cumberland County, New Jersey on August 21, 1915, and was buried in Spring Hill Cemetery in Charleston, West Virginia. His son and namesake was United States Navy Admiral Charles P. Snyder. His great-great-granddaughter is actress Elizabeth McGovern.

== See also ==
- West Virginia's congressional delegations

== Sources ==
United States Congress. "SNYDER, Charles Philip (id: S000665)". Biographical Directory of the United States Congress. Online. September 10, 2007.

U.S. House of Representatives
Preceded by John E. Kenna	Member of the U.S. House of Representatives from West Virginia's 3rd congressional district 1883–1889	Succeeded by John D. Alderson
