= Lynn Hornor =

American politician

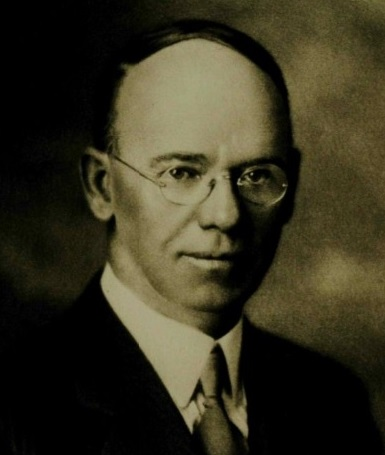
Frontispiece of 1934's Lynn S. Horner, Late a Representative from West Virginia

Lynn Sedwick Hornor (November 3, 1874 – September 23, 1933) was an American politician who represented West Virginia in the United States House of Representatives from 1931 to 1933.

Hornor was born in Clarksburg, West Virginia. He attended the public schools. He was employed as a bank clerk in 1892 and served successively as cashier and director until his death. In addition, he was president and manager of a number of coal, oil and gas development, and land companies. He was president of the West Virginia Natural Gas Association in 1917 and 1918.

During the First World War, Hornor served as a member of the advisory West Virginia council of defense. He was elected as a Democrat to the Seventy-second and Seventy-third Congresses and served from March 4, 1931, until his death in Washington, D.C. in 1933. He was buried in Odd Fellows Cemetery, Clarksburg, West Virginia.

== See also ==
- List of members of the United States Congress who died in office (1900–1949)

U.S. House of Representatives
Preceded by John M. Wolverton	Member of the U.S. House of Representatives from West Virginia's 3rd congressional district 1931–1933	Succeeded by Andrew Edmiston, Jr.
