= Jodie, West Virginia =

- Unincorporated community
- Location within West Virginia Location within the United States
- Coordinates: 38°13′49″N 81°08′52″W
- Country: United States
- State: West Virginia
- County: Fayette
- Elevation: 705 ft (215 m)
- Time zone: UTC-5 (Eastern (EST))
  - Summer (DST): UTC-4 (EDT)
- ZIP code: 26690
- Area codes: 304 & 681
- GNIS feature ID: 1554812

Jodie, also known as Imboden, is an unincorporated community in Fayette County, West Virginia, United States. It is located along the Gauley River at the mouth of Rich Creek, 4 miles (6.4 km) northeast of Gauley Bridge. Due to its proximity to the county line, Jodie is part of the Nicholas County ZIP code of 26690; it had its own post office until its closure on July 23, 2005.

== History ==
The first houses in the community were built by local logging companies in the late 1800s. The first post office was established in 1894, naming the town Imboden. The name was changed to Jodie (the nickname of local congressman Joseph H. Gaines) in 1910. The Chesapeake and Ohio Railway established a station in the community in 1912, named Bryce. In 1915, the Gauley Mountain Coal Company established Jodie as a coal town, utilizing existing lumber company houses and building additional ones to give the community its current look. A company store, movie theater, and boarding house were also built for the town, but they are now long gone. The houses were sold off to residents in the mid-1940s, and the local mines closed less than ten years later, forcing residents to commute elsewhere for employment.

== Community ==
Jodie is home to two churches: Jodie Baptist Church on the riverfront, and Jodie Church of God, located in "New-Town".

The town cemetery is named Rich Creek.

The annual Jodie Reunion is held every summer to welcome past and present residents.

== Transportation ==
At one time, Jodie was connected to West Virginia Route 39 via ferry across the Gauley River. After the loss of the ferry in the early 1950s, residents were forced to rely on a 1926 C&O railroad bridge converted for automobile traffic, until the C.D. Coleman Bridge was completed in the mid-2000s.
