= List of presidents and principals of Glenville State University =

President of Glenville State University
- Incumbent; Mark A. Manchin since 2020
- Appointer: Glenville State University Board of Governors
- Formation: 1872 (principal); 1915 (president)
- First holder: Thomas Marcellus Marshall (principal); Edward Gay Rohrbough (president)
- Website: Office of the President

This list of presidents and principals of Glenville State University includes all who have served as principals or presidents of Glenville State University since its founding in 1872.

== Principals ==
=== As Glenville Branch of the West Virginia Normal School (1872–1900) ===
- Thomas Marcellus Marshall, January 1873-June 1873
- Louis Bennett, 1873–1875
- Thomas Marcellus Marshall, 1875–1881
- Robert Franklin Kidd, 1882–1884
- Reverend Ezra Irwin Hall, 1884–1885
- Samuel B. Brown, 1885–1890
- R.W. Tapp, 1890–1891
- Verona Mapel, 1891-February 1892
- William J. Holden, 1895–1901

=== As Glenville State Normal School (1900–1931) ===
- John C. Shaw, 1901–1908
- Edward Gay Rohrbough, 1908–1914
- S. Orestes Bond, 1914–1915

== Presidents ==
=== As Glenville State Normal School (1900–1931) ===
- Edward Gay Rohrbough, 1915–1942

=== As Glenville State Teachers College (1931–1943) ===
- David L. Haught, 1942–1947

=== As Glenville State College (1943–2022) ===
- Robert T. Crawford, August 1947-October 1947
- Harry Bruce Heflin, 1947–1964
- D. Banks Wilburn, 1964–1977
- William K. Simmons, 1977–1988
- James Lowell Peterson, February 1988-June 1989
- William K. Simmons, 1989–1998
- Bruce C. Flack, 1998–1999
- Thomas H. Powell, 1999–2003
- Robert N. Freeman, 2003–2006
- Peter B. Barr, 2006–2017
- Tracy L. Pellett, 2017–2019
- Kathleen L. Nelson, 2019–2020

=== As Glenville State University (2022–present) ===
- Mark A. Manchin, 2020–Present
