= Cleveland M. Bailey =

American politician

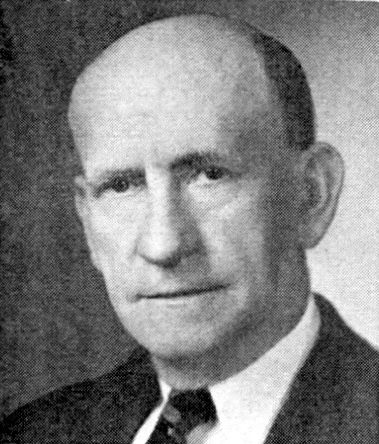
- From 1953's Pocket Congressional Directory of the 83rd Congress

Member of the U.S. House of Representatives from West Virginia's 3rd district
- In office January 3, 1949 – January 3, 1963
- Preceded by: Edward G. Rohrbough
- Succeeded by: Arch A. Moore Jr. (redistricting)
- In office January 3, 1945 – January 3, 1947
- Preceded by: Edward G. Rohrbough
- Succeeded by: Edward G. Rohrbough

Personal details
- Born: July 15, 1886 St. Marys, West Virginia, U.S.
- Died: July 13, 1965 (aged 78) Charleston, West Virginia, U.S.
- Party: Democratic
- Spouse: Maude Agatha Rigby (m. 1908)

Cleveland Monroe Bailey (July 15, 1886 – July 13, 1965) was a U.S. representative from West Virginia.

== Biography ==
Born on a farm near St. Marys, West Virginia in Pleasants County, Bailey attended the public schools, and West Liberty State College, West Liberty, West Virginia. He graduated from Geneva College in Beaver Falls, Pennsylvania, in 1908. High school principal at Clarksburg, West Virginia, in 1917 and 1918. He served as district supervisor of schools 1919–1922. Bailey was a councilman of Clarksburg, W.Virginia from 1921 to 1923. He worked as an Associated Press editor in Clarksburg, West Virginia from 1923 to 1933. He served as assistant State auditor 1933–1941, and was the state budget director 1941–1944. Bailey served as delegate to the Democratic National Convention at Chicago in 1932.

In 1955, he allegedly punched New York Congressman Adam Clayton Powell over a school construction bill rider. Powell's rider would have prevented federal education funds from being allocated to states with segregated schools; Bailey opposed the rider, which was defeated. One Congressman told reporters that Bailey had hit Powell and knocked him to the floor. Bailey denied it, and stated that while Powell and he had argued, no punches were thrown.

Bailey was elected as a Democrat to the Seventy-ninth Congress (January 3, 1945 – January 3, 1947). He was an unsuccessful candidate for reelection in 1946 to the Eightieth Congress. State tax statistician in 1947 and 1948.

Bailey was elected to the Eighty-first and to the six succeeding Congresses (January 3, 1949 – January 3, 1963). He was an unsuccessful candidate for reelection in 1962 to the Eighty-eighth Congress. Bailey did not sign the 1956 Southern Manifesto and voted in favor of Civil Rights Act of 1960 and the 24th Amendment to the U.S. Constitution, but did not vote on the Civil Rights Act of 1957. He was a resident of Clarksburg, West Virginia. He died in Charleston, West Virginia, July 13, 1965. He was interred in Greenlawn Cemetery, Clarksburg, West Virginia.

He has an elementary school named in his honor in Midwest City, Oklahoma.

== Sources ==
- United States Congress. "Cleveland M. Bailey (id: B000035)". Biographical Directory of the United States Congress.

U.S. House of Representatives
Preceded by Edward G. Rohrbough	Member of the U.S. House of Representatives from West Virginia's 3rd congressional district 1945–1947	Succeeded by Edward G. Rohrbough
Preceded by Edward G. Rohrbough	Member of the U.S. House of Representatives from West Virginia's 3rd congressional district 1949–1963	Succeeded by John M. Slack Jr.
