= Adam Brown Littlepage =

American politician (1859–1921)

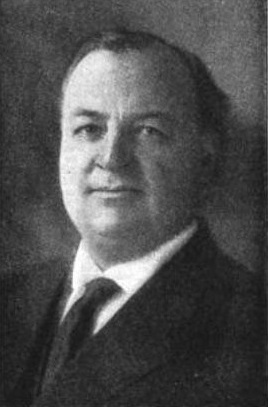
Adam Brown Littlepage, West Virginia Congressman.

Adam Brown Littlepage (April 14, 1859 – June 29, 1921) was a lawyer and Democratic politician from West Virginia who served as a United States representative. Littlepage was born near Charleston, West Virginia, in Kanawha County (then in Virginia) on April 14, 1859. He served as a member of the 62nd, 64th, and 65th United States Congresses. He died in Charleston, June 29, 1921.

He attended the common schools, studied law, and was admitted to the bar. He entered practice in Newport, Indiana, in 1882. He returned to Charleston in 1884 and continued the practice of law. He served the United Mine Workers Association in West Virginia as general counsel. From 1906 to 1910, he served as a member of the West Virginia Senate.

He was elected from West Virginia's 3rd District as a Democrat to the Sixty-second Congress (March 4, 1911 – March 3, 1913). His candidacy for re-election to the Sixty-third Congress in 1912 was unsuccessful. He returned to serve from West Virginia's 3rd District in the Sixty-fourth and Sixty-fifth Congresses (March 4, 1915 – March 3, 1919). He was an unsuccessful candidate for re-election in 1918 to the Sixty-sixth Congress and returned to his law practice. He died in Charleston on June 29, 1921, and was interred there at Spring Hill Cemetery.

== See also ==
- List of United States representatives from West Virginia
- West Virginia's congressional delegations

U.S. House of Representatives
Preceded by Joseph H. Gaines	Member of the U.S. House of Representatives from West Virginia's 3rd congressional district 1911–1913	Succeeded by Samuel B. Avis
Preceded by Samuel B. Avis	Member of the U.S. House of Representatives from West Virginia's 3rd congressional district 1915–1917	Succeeded by Stuart F. Reed
Preceded by Howard Sutherland - at-large	Member of the U.S. House of Representatives from West Virginia's 6th congressional district 1917–1919	Succeeded by Leonard S. Echols
