= John D. Alderson =

American politician (1854–1910)

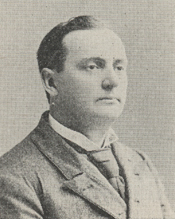

Member of the U.S. House of Representatives from West Virginia's 3rd district
- In office March 4, 1889 – March 3, 1895
- Preceded by: Charles P. Snyder
- Succeeded by: James H. Hurling

Personal details
- Born: November 29, 1854 Nicholas Court House, Virginia (now Summersville, West Virginia)
- Died: December 5, 1910 (aged 56) Richwood, West Virginia
- Resting place: Summersville, West Virginia

John D. Alderson (November 29, 1854 – December 5, 1910) was a lawyer and Democratic politician from West Virginia who served as a United States representative from West Virginia.

== Biography ==
He was born at Nicholas Court House, Virginia (now Summersville, West Virginia) on November 29, 1854. He was a member of the 51st, 52nd, and 53rd United States Congresses. He died December 5, 1910.

He served as sergeant at arms of the West Virginia Senate from 1871 to 1873, and the State Senate's doorkeeper in 1872 and 1873. After studying law, he was admitted to the bar in 1876 and entered practice at Nicholas County Court House. He was appointed prosecuting attorney for the counties of Nicholas and Webster in 1876. He was subsequently elected prosecuting attorney for these counties and then re-elected in 1880 and 1884, serving until January 1, 1889. He also served as clerk of the State Senate from 1883 to 1887. He was elected as a Democrat to the Fifty-first, Fifty-second, and Fifty-third Congresses (March 4, 1889 – March 3, 1895).

His candidacy for re-election in 1894 was unsuccessful. Afterward, he returned to his law the practice in Nicholas County. He served as a delegate to the Democratic National Conventions in 1900 and 1908. He died in Richwood, West Virginia, in Nicholas County on December 5, 1910, and was buried in a private burial ground at Summersville, West Virginia.

== See also ==
- West Virginia's congressional delegations

== Sources ==
United States Congress. "ALDERSON, John Duffy (id: A000080)". Biographical Directory of the United States Congress. Online. September 11, 2007.

U.S. House of Representatives
Preceded by Charles P. Snyder	Member of the U.S. House of Representatives from West Virginia's 3rd congressional district 1889–1895	Succeeded by James Hall Huling
