= Andrew Edmiston Jr. =

American politician

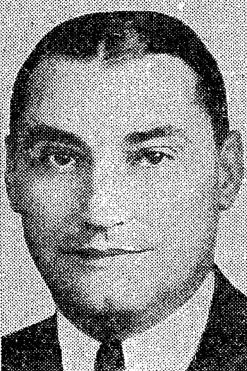
- Edmiston Jr. in 1934

Member of the U.S. House of Representatives from West Virginia's 3rd district
- In office November 28, 1933 – January 3, 1943
- Preceded by: Lynn Hornor
- Succeeded by: Edward G. Rohrbough

Chairman of the West Virginia Democratic Party Executive Committee
- In office 1928–1932

Mayor of Weston, West Virginia
- In office 1924–1926

Personal details
- Born: November 13, 1892 Weston, West Virginia, United States
- Died: August 28, 1966 (aged 73) Weston
- Resting place: Machpelah Cemetery, Weston
- Party: Democratic
- Education: Friends' Select School; Kentucky Military Institute; West Virginia University
- Military career
- Allegiance: United States
- Branch: Army
- Rank: Second lieutenant
- Units: Thirty-ninth Infantry; Fourth Infantry
- Conflicts: World War I
- Awards: Distinguished Service Cross; Purple Heart; Distinguished Service Medal of West Virginia

Andrew Edmiston Jr. (November 13, 1892– August 28, 1966) was a Democratic politician who served as a United States representative from West Virginia. He was born in Weston in Lewis County, West Virginia on November 13, 1892. He served in the Seventy-third through Seventy-seventh Congresses.

He attended the Friends' Select School in Washington, D.C., Kentucky Military Institute at Lyndon, and West Virginia University at Morgantown, West Virginia. He was engaged in agricultural pursuits from 1915 to 1917 and in the manufacture of glass at Weston, West Virginia, starting in 1925. He served overseas in World War I as a second lieutenant with the Thirty-ninth Infantry, Fourth Division from 1917 to 1919. He was awarded the Distinguished Service Cross, the Purple Heart with Oak Leaf Cluster, and the Distinguished Service Medal of West Virginia.

From 1920 to 1935 he served as editor of the Weston Democrat. He held the office of mayor of Weston from 1924 to 1926 and served as a delegate to the Democratic National Conventions in 1928 and 1952. He was state chairman of the Democratic executive committee from 1928 to 1932. He was elected to fill the vacancy caused by the death of Lynn Hornor. Re-elected to the Seventy-fourth and to three succeeding Congresses, he served from November 28, 1933, to January 3, 1943. His candidacy for re-election in 1942 was unsuccessful. He then returned to his former business pursuits. On June 28, 1943, he was appointed Director of War Manpower for West Virginia and served until his resignation on June 30, 1945, to return to private business. He died in Weston on August 28, 1966, aged 73. He was buried in Machpelah Cemetery.

== See also ==
- West Virginia's congressional delegations

U.S. House of Representatives
Preceded by Lynn Hornor	Member of the U.S. House of Representatives from West Virginia's 3rd congressional district 1933–1943	Succeeded by Edward G. Rohrbough
