= Mark Manchin =

American politician

26th President of Glenville State University
- Incumbent
- Assumed office July 1, 2020
- Preceded by: Tracy Pellett

Member of the West Virginia Senate from the 8th district
- In office December 1, 1988 – December 1, 1992
- Preceded by: Mario Palumbo
- Succeeded by: David Grubb

Personal details
- Born: Mark Anthony Manchin; August 9, 1952 (age 74)
- Party: Democratic
- Spouse: Virginia Mastrogiuseppe (m. 1972)
- Children: 2
- Parent: A. James Manchin (father)
- Relatives: Joe Manchin (cousin)
- Education: Fairmont State College (BA); West Virginia University (MA, Ed.D)

Mark Anthony Manchin (born August 9, 1952) is an American educator and politician. He is a son of A. James Manchin and first cousin of Joe Manchin. He has served as the president of Glenville State University since 2020. He was previously a member of the West Virginia Senate.

== See also ==
- List of presidents and principals of Glenville State University
