= James H. Huling =

American politician (1844–1918)

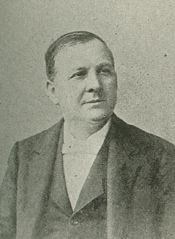

Member of the U.S. House of Representatives from West Virginia's 3rd district
- In office March 4, 1895 – March 3, 1897
- Preceded by: John D. Alderson
- Succeeded by: Charles Dorr

Mayor of Charleston, West Virginia
- In office 1884–1888

Personal details
- Born: James Hall Huling; March 24, 1844 Williamsport, Pennsylvania, U.S.
- Died: April 23, 1918 (aged 74) Charleston, West Virginia, U.S.
- Resting place: Spring Hill Cemetery, Charleston, West Virginia, U.S.
- Party: Republican
- Education: Lycoming College
- Profession: Politician, businessman
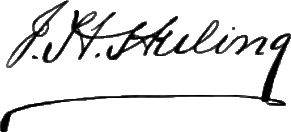
- Signature

James Hall Huling (March 24, 1844 – April 23, 1918) was an American Republican businessman and politician from West Virginia who served as a United States representative in the 54th United States Congress. Congressman Huling was born in Williamsport in Lycoming County, Pennsylvania, on March 24, 1844. He died April 23, 1918.

He went to school at Lycoming College in Williamsport. He served in the Pennsylvania Cavalry in 1863. He engaged in the lumber business and moved to West Virginia in 1870, he left the lumber business in 1874. He served as mayor of Charleston, West Virginia, from 1884 to 1888 but declined a renomination. He won election from West Virginia's 3rd District in 1894 as a Republican to the Fifty-fourth Congress (March 4, 1895 – March 3, 1897). He returned to business in Charleston, where he died April 23, 1918. Congressman Huling was buried there in Spring Hill Cemetery.

== See also ==
- West Virginia's congressional delegations
- List of mayors of Charleston, West Virginia

== Sources ==
- United States Congress. "HULING, James Hall (id: H000938)". Biographical Directory of the United States Congress. Online. September 11, 2007.

U.S. House of Representatives
Preceded by John D. Alderson	Member of the U.S. House of Representatives from West Virginia's 3rd congressional district 1895–1897	Succeeded by Charles Dorr
