= Samuel B. Avis =

American politician (1872–1924)

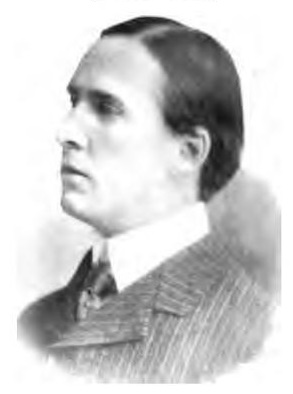
From Volume II (1903) of Men of West Virginia

Samuel Brashear Avis (February 19, 1872 – June 8, 1924) was an American politician who represented West Virginia in the United States House of Representatives from 1913 to 1915.

Avis was born in Harrisonburg, Virginia where he attended the public schools and Staunton Military Academy. He was graduated from the law department of Washington and Lee University, Lexington, Virginia. Admitted to the bar in 1893, he commenced practice in Charleston, West Virginia.

Avis was commissioned senior captain of Company A, Second West Virginia Volunteer Infantry, during the Spanish–American War in 1898. He served until 1899 when he was honorably discharged. After the war, he served as prosecuting attorney of Kanawha County, West Virginia from January 1, 1900, to December 31, 1912. Later, he was an assistant United States attorney for the southern district of West Virginia from August 22 to November 15, 1904.

He was elected as a Republican to the Sixty-third Congress (March 4, 1913 – March 3, 1915) but was an unsuccessful candidate for reelection in 1914 to the Sixty-fourth Congress. After leaving Congress, he resumed the practice of law. He was killed by lightning in Charleston, West Virginia June 8, 1924, and was interred there in Spring Hill Cemetery.

U.S. House of Representatives
Preceded by Adam Brown Littlepage	Member of the U.S. House of Representatives from West Virginia's 3rd congressional district 1913–1915	Succeeded by Adam Brown Littlepage
