= Joseph H. Gaines =

American politician (1864–1951)

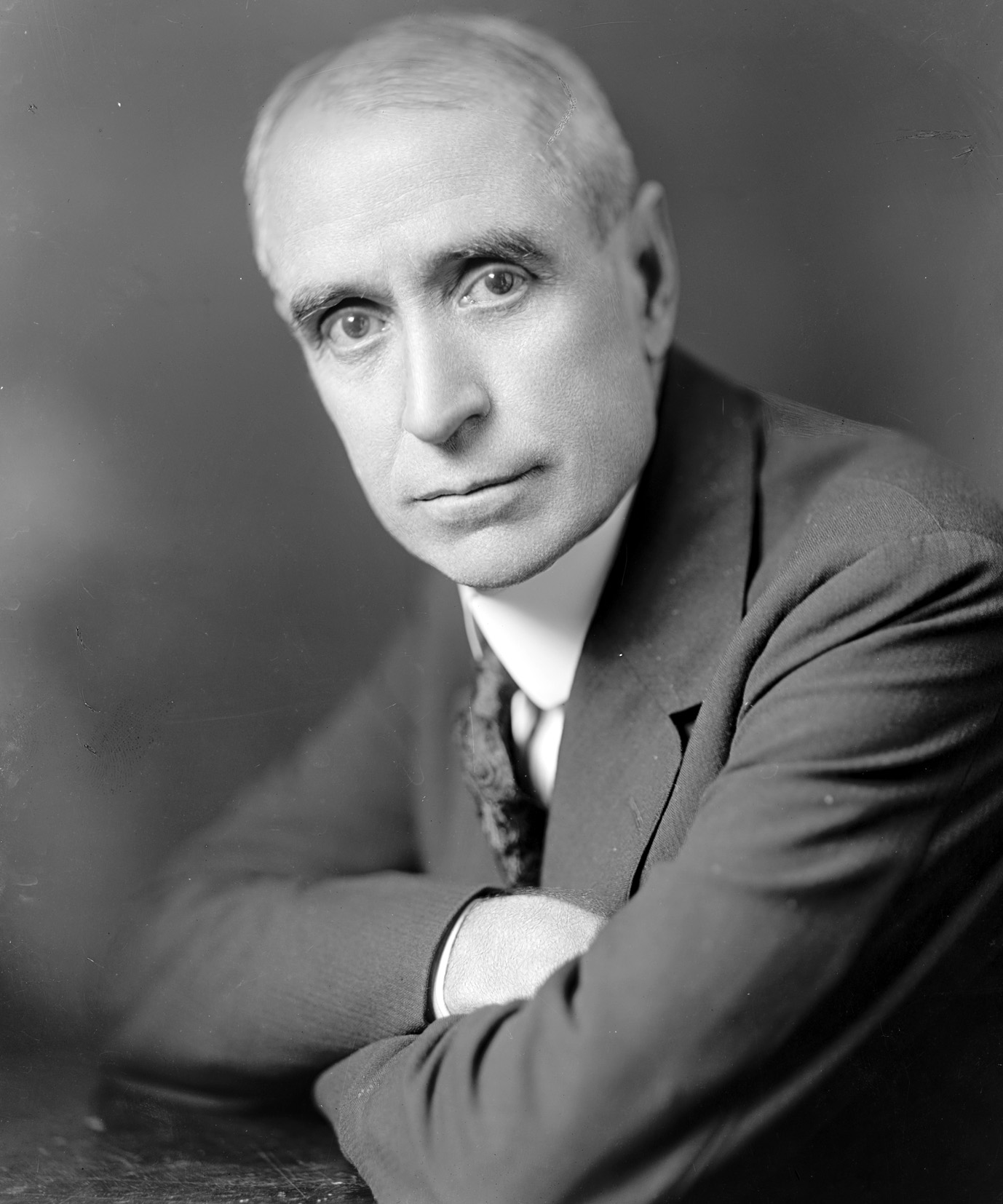

Member of the U.S. House of Representatives from West Virginia's 3rd district
- In office March 4, 1901 – March 3, 1911
- Preceded by: David Emmons Johnston
- Succeeded by: Adam Brown Littlepage

Personal details
- Born: Joseph Holt Gaines; September 3, 1864 Washington, D.C., USA
- Died: April 12, 1951 (aged 86) Montgomery, West Virginia, USA
- Resting place: Charleston, West Virginia, USA
- Party: Republican
- Education: Princeton College
- Occupation: Lawyer; politician

Joseph Holt 'Jodie' Gaines (September 3, 1864 – April 12, 1951) was a U.S. representative from West Virginia.

Born in Washington, D.C., Gaines moved with his parents to Fayette County, West Virginia, in 1867. He attended the West Virginia University at Morgantown and was graduated from Princeton College in 1886. He was admitted to the bar in 1887 and commenced practice in Fayetteville, West Virginia. He was appointed United States district attorney for West Virginia by President William McKinley in 1897. He resigned in 1901.

Gaines was elected as a Republican to the Fifty-seventh and to the four succeeding Congresses (March 4, 1901 – March 3, 1911). He served as chairman of the Committee on Election of President, Vice President, and Representatives (Fifty-eighth through Sixty-first Congresses). He was an unsuccessful candidate for reelection in 1910. He resumed the practice of law in Charleston, West Virginia. He died in Montgomery, West Virginia, April 12, 1951. He was interred in Spring Hill Cemetery, Charleston, West Virginia. The town of Jodie, West Virginia was named in his honor.

== See also ==
- List of United States representatives from West Virginia

== Sources ==
- United States Congress. "Joseph H. Gaines (id: G000008)". Biographical Directory of the United States Congress.

U.S. House of Representatives
Preceded by David Emmons Johnston	Member of the U.S. House of Representatives from West Virginia's 3rd congressional district 1901–1911	Succeeded by Adam Brown Littlepage
