= West Virginia's congressional districts =

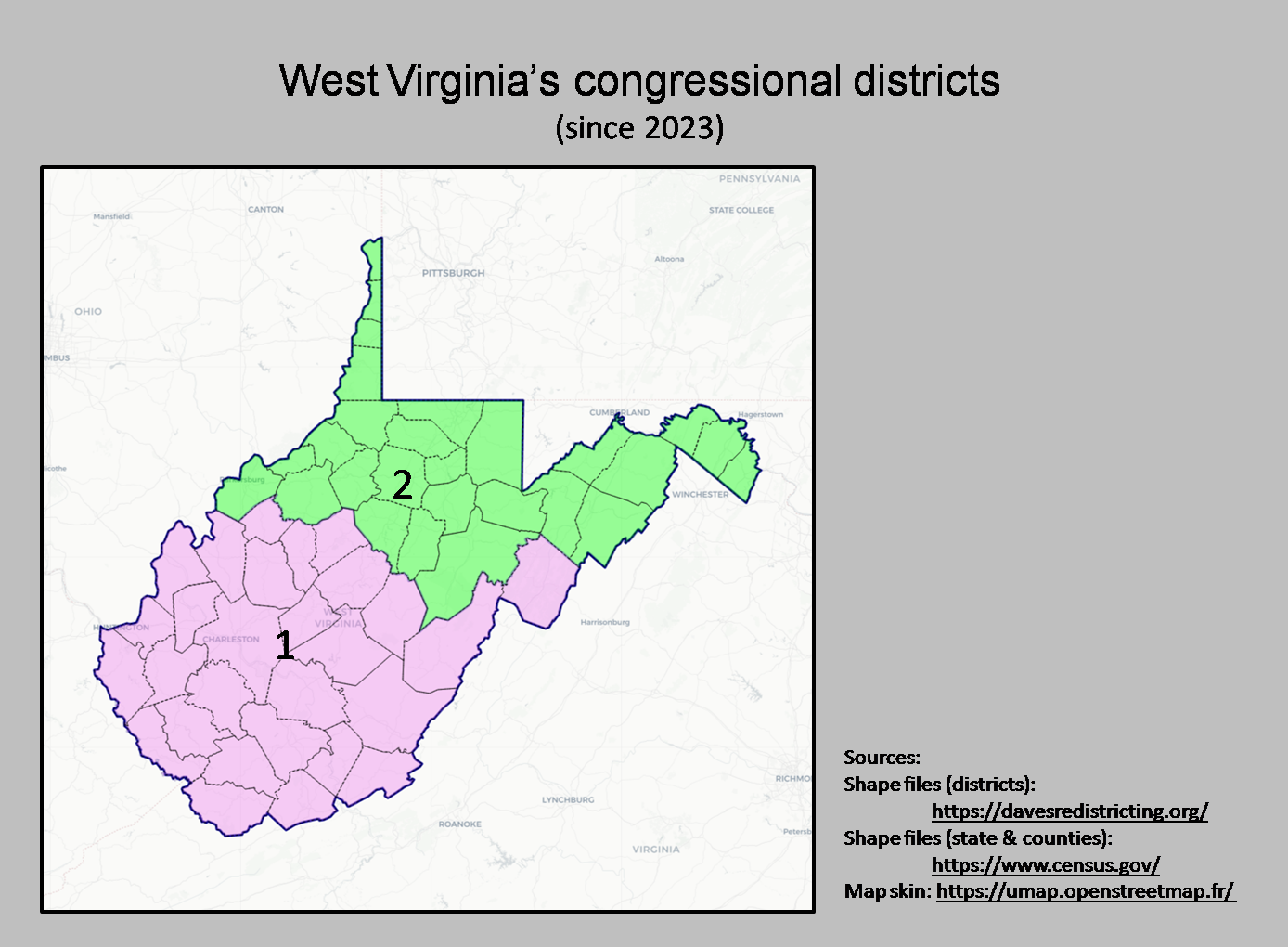
Map of West Virginia's congressional districts since 2023 Interactive map version

The U.S. state of West Virginia currently has two congressional districts, each represented by a member of the United States House of Representatives.

== Current districts and representatives ==
This is a list of United States representatives from West Virginia, district boundaries, and the district political ratings according to the CPVI. The delegation has a total of two members, both of whom are Republicans.

Current U.S. representatives from West Virginia
District	Member (Residence)	Party	Incumbent since	CPVI (2025)	District map
1st	Carol Miller (Huntington)	Republican	January 3, 2019	R+22	
2nd	Riley Moore (Harpers Ferry)	Republican	January 3, 2025	R+20	

== Historical results ==
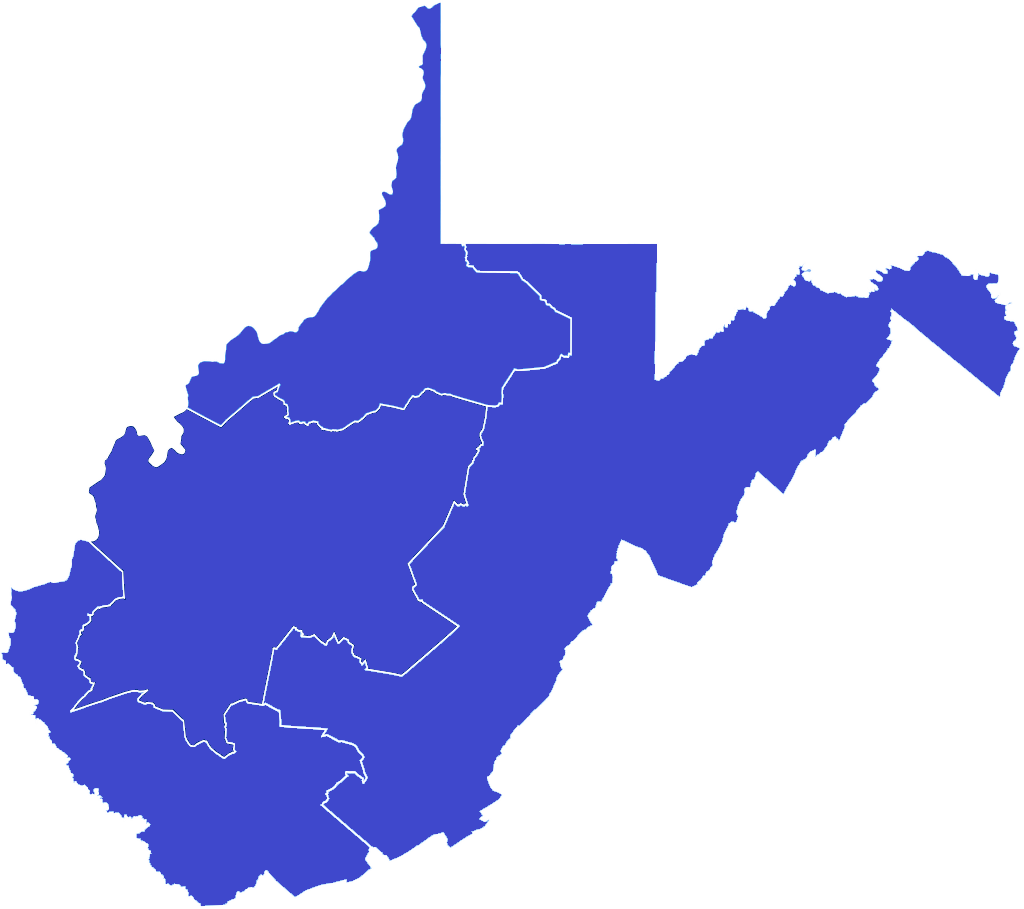
1982

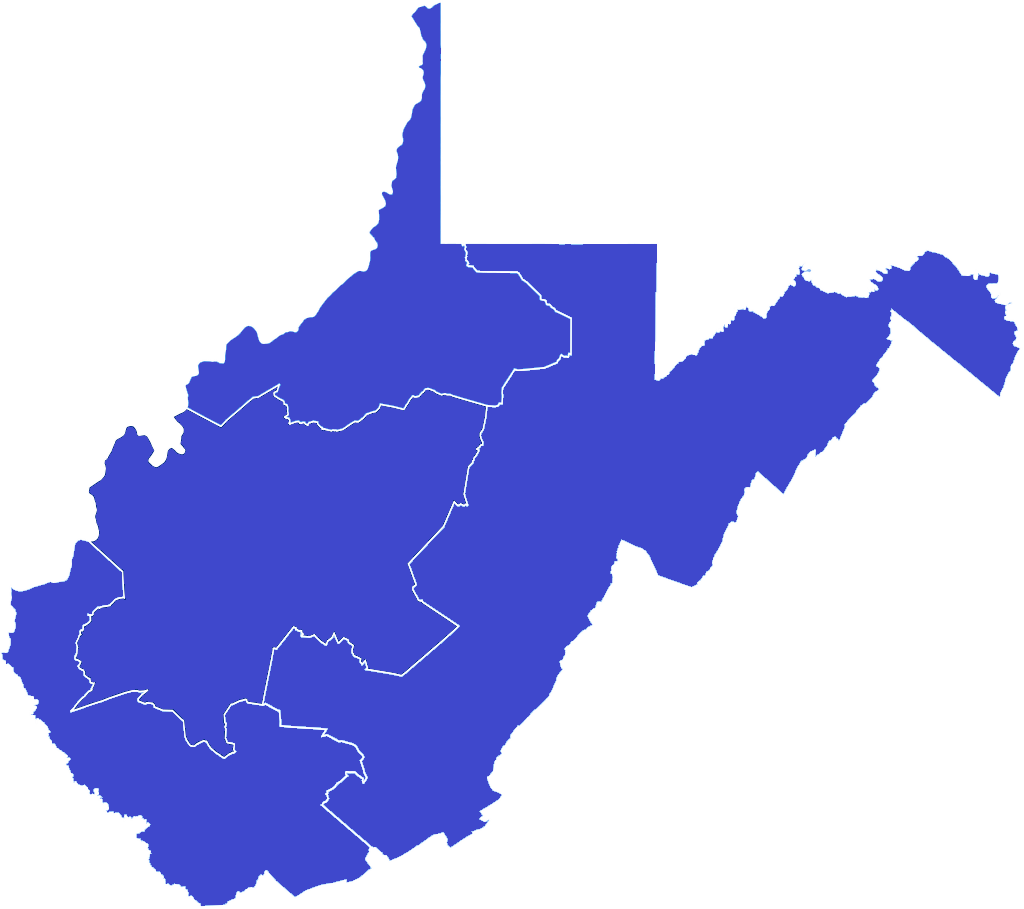
1984

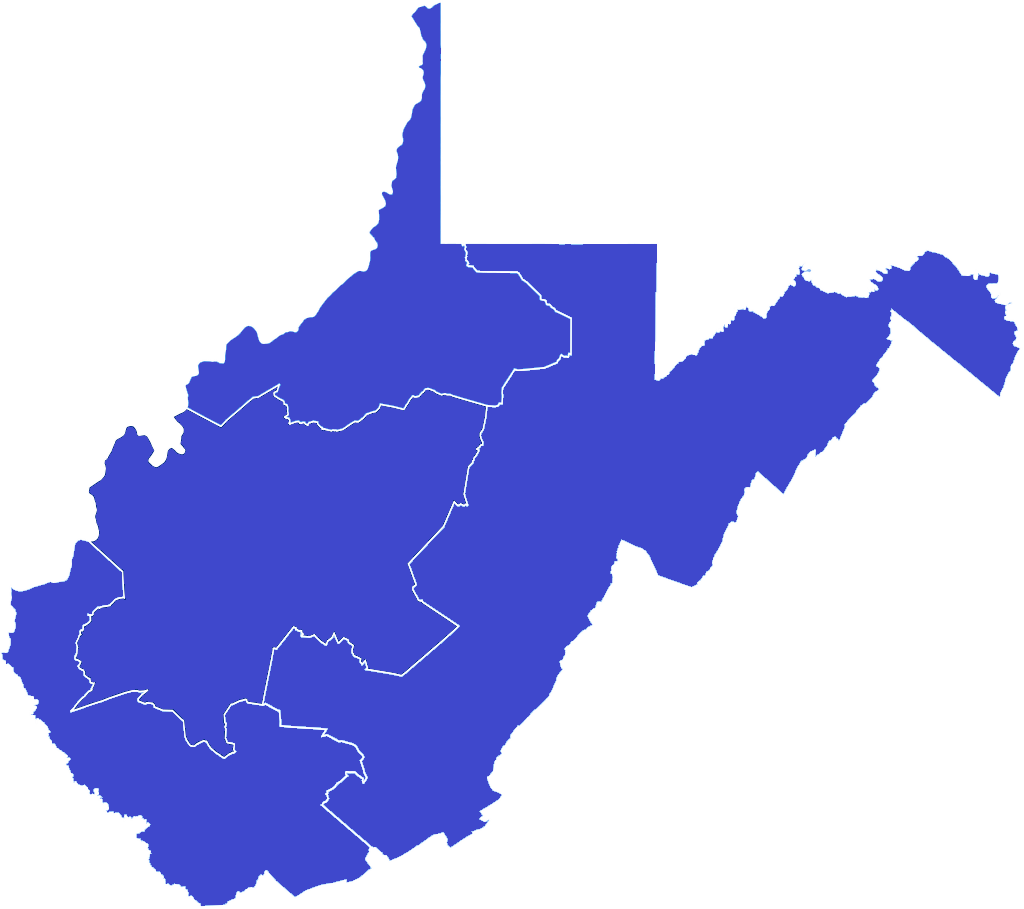
1986

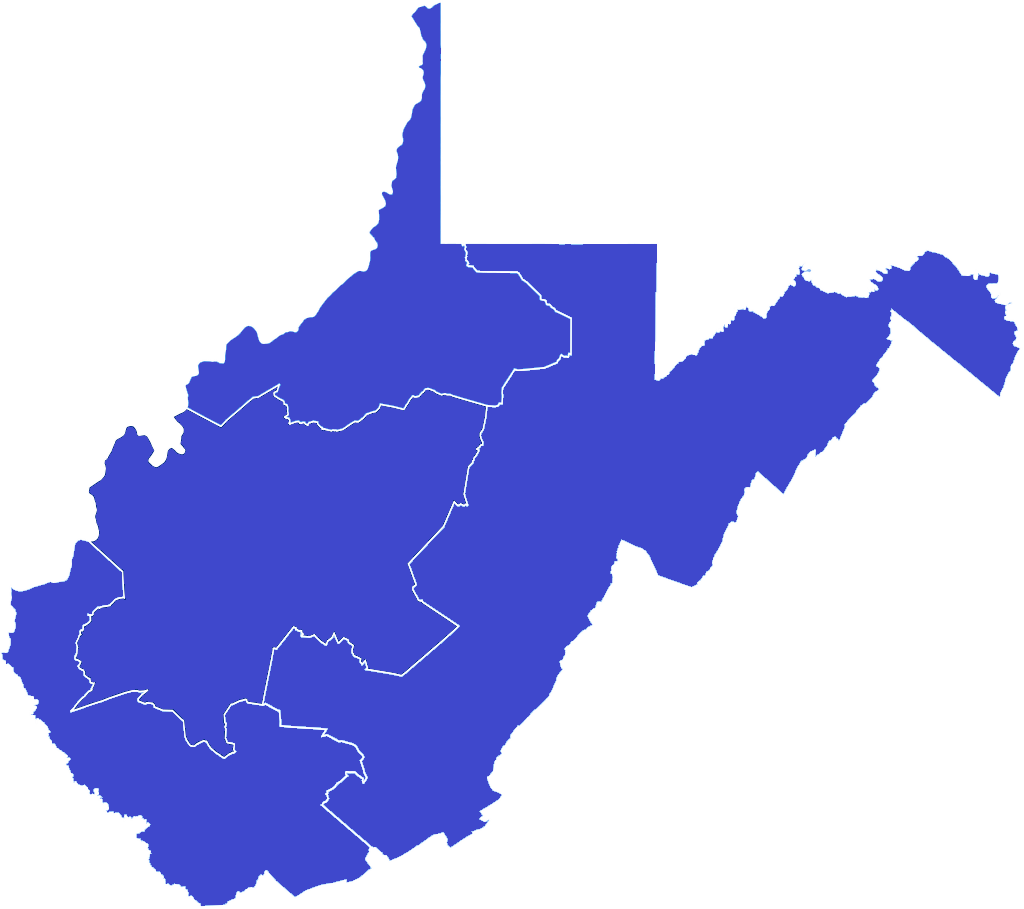
1988

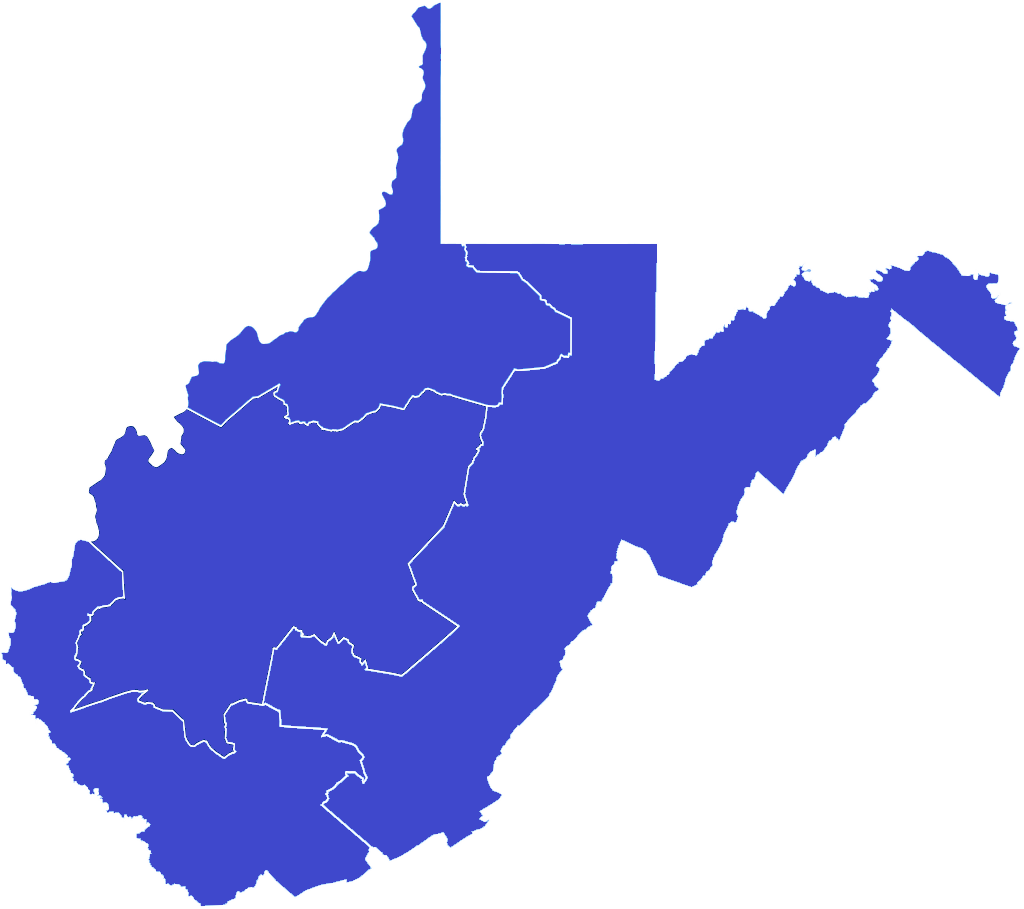
1990

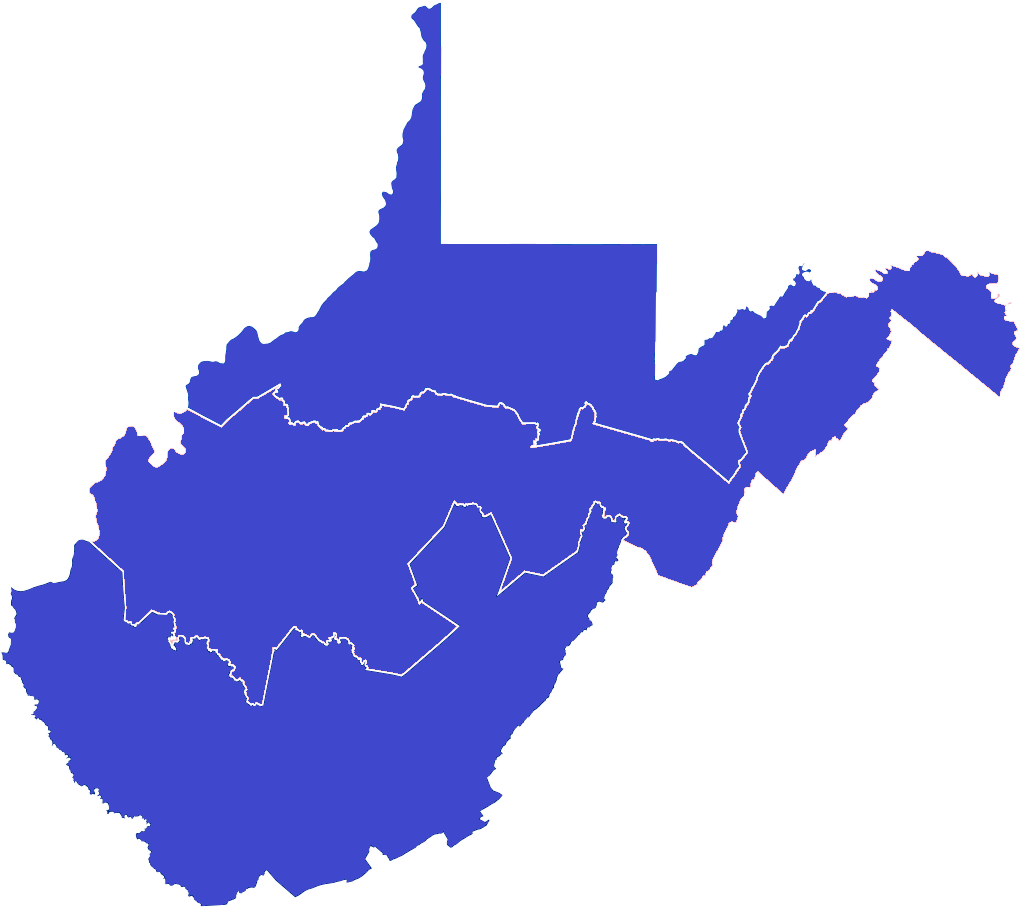
1992

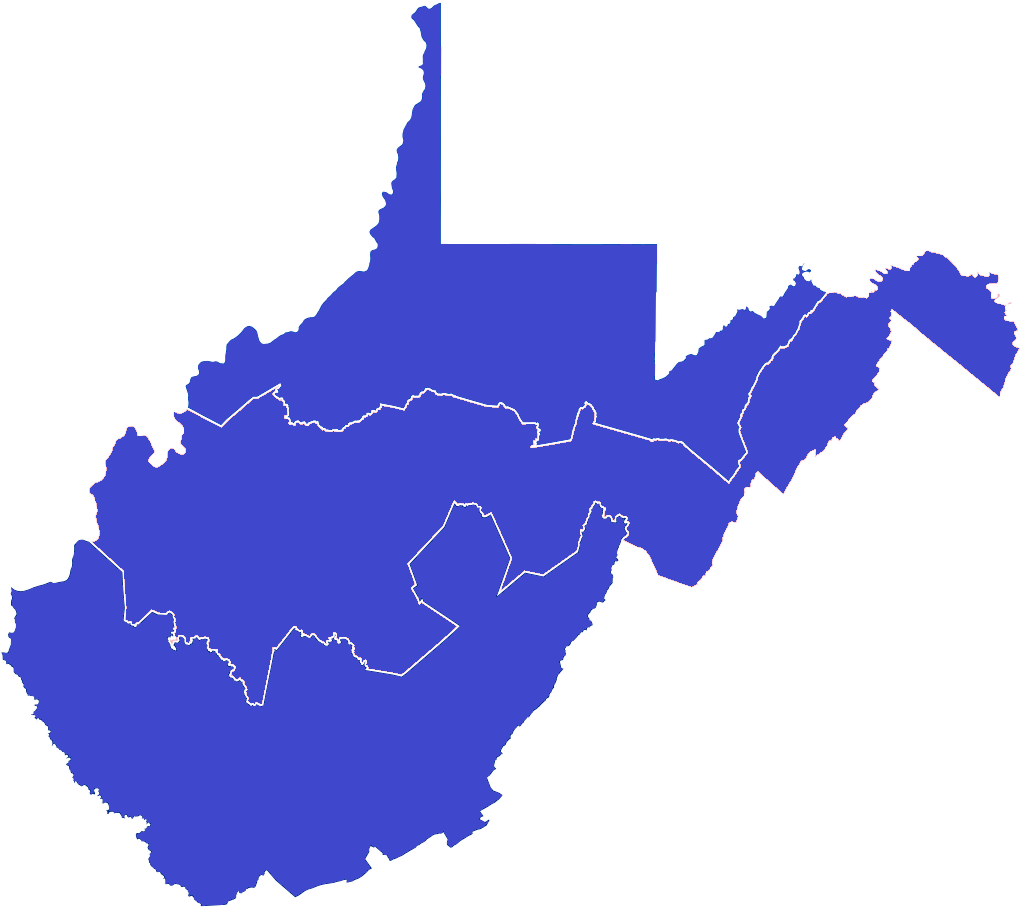
1994

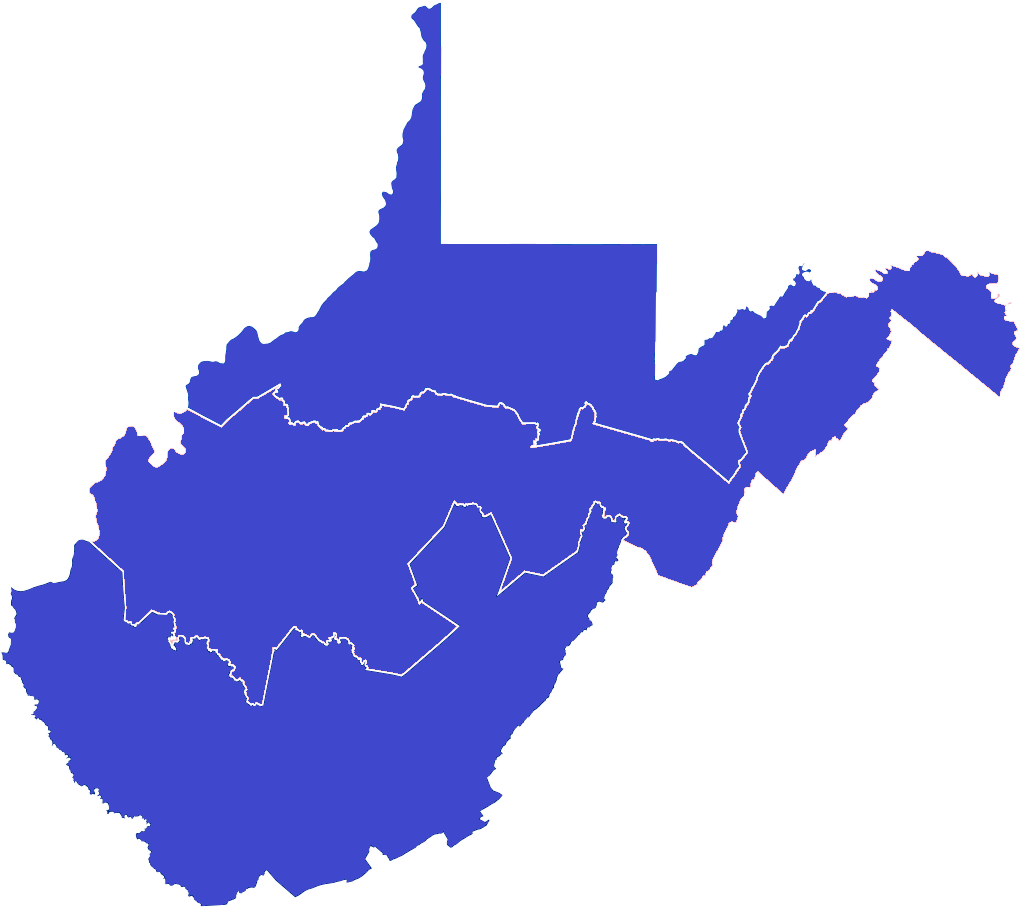
1996

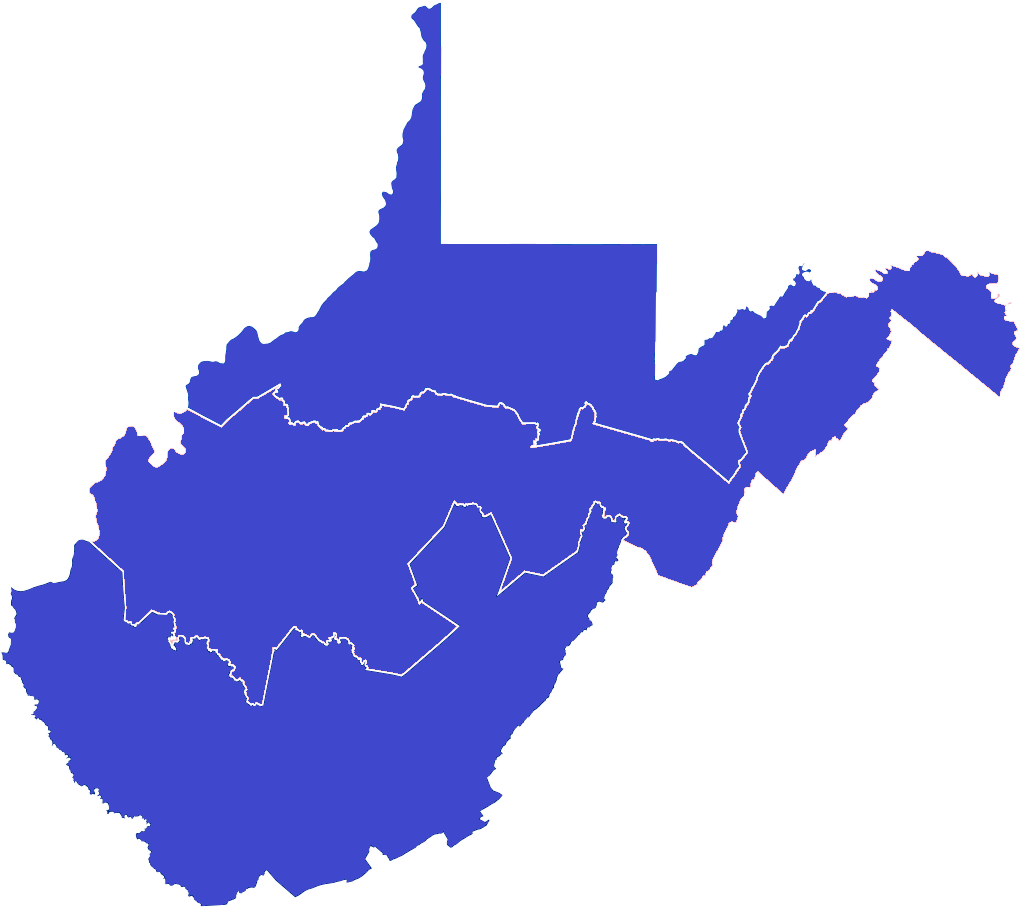
1998

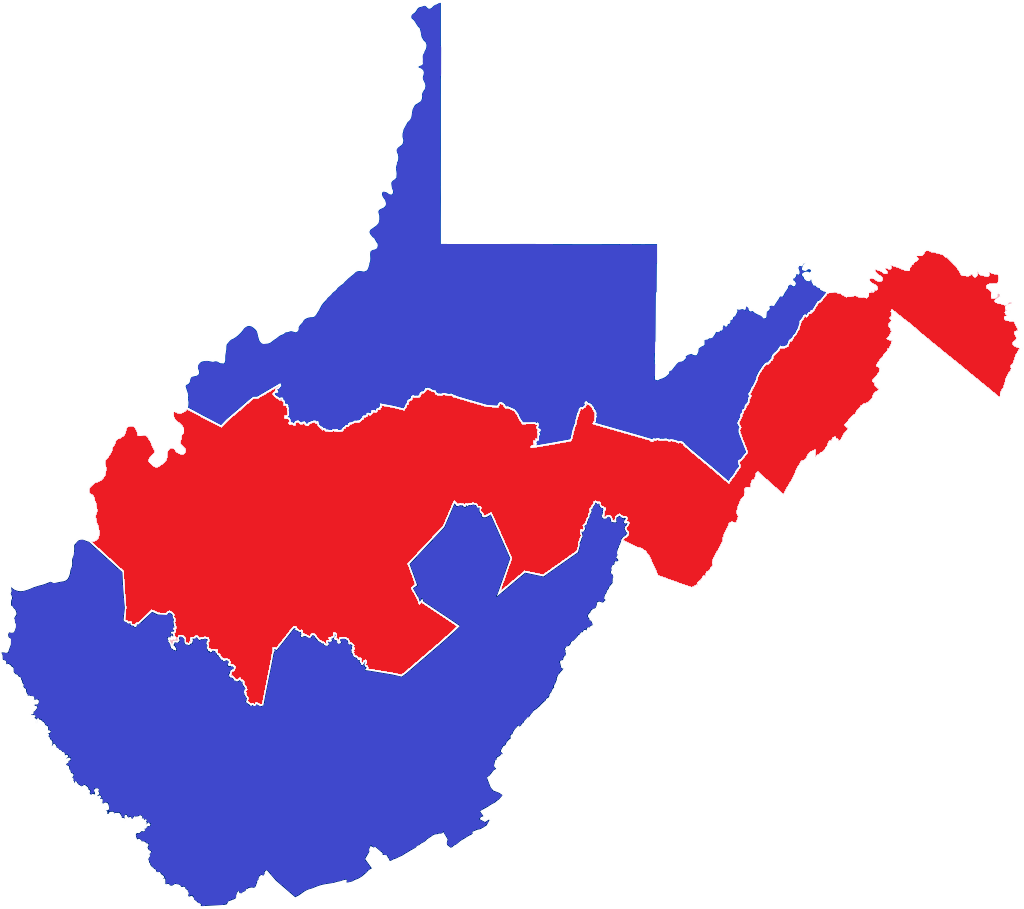
2000

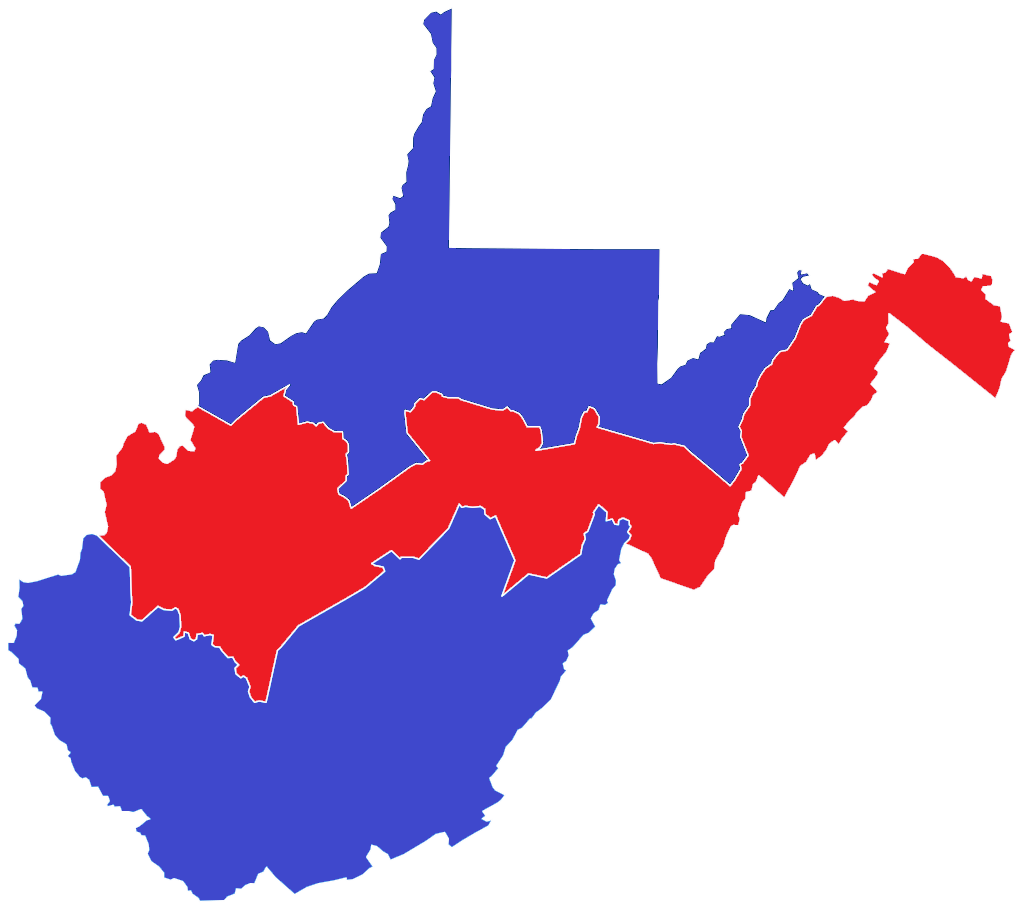
2002

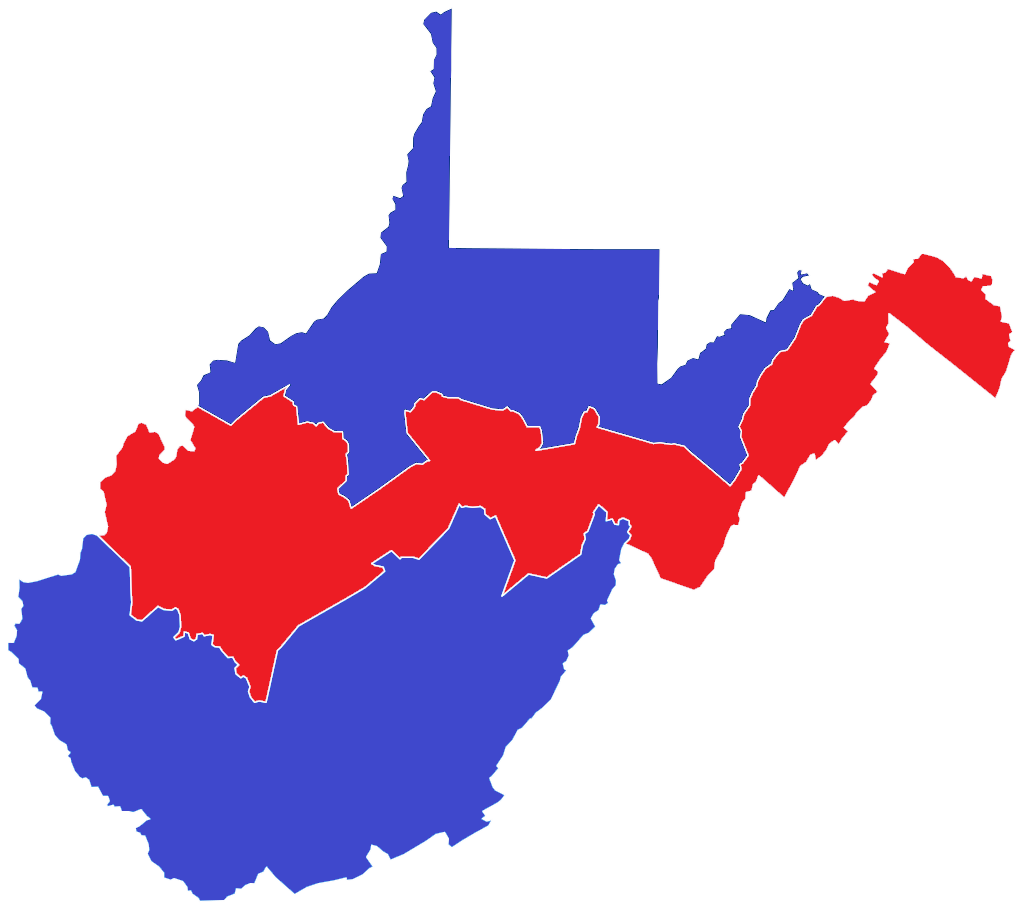
2004

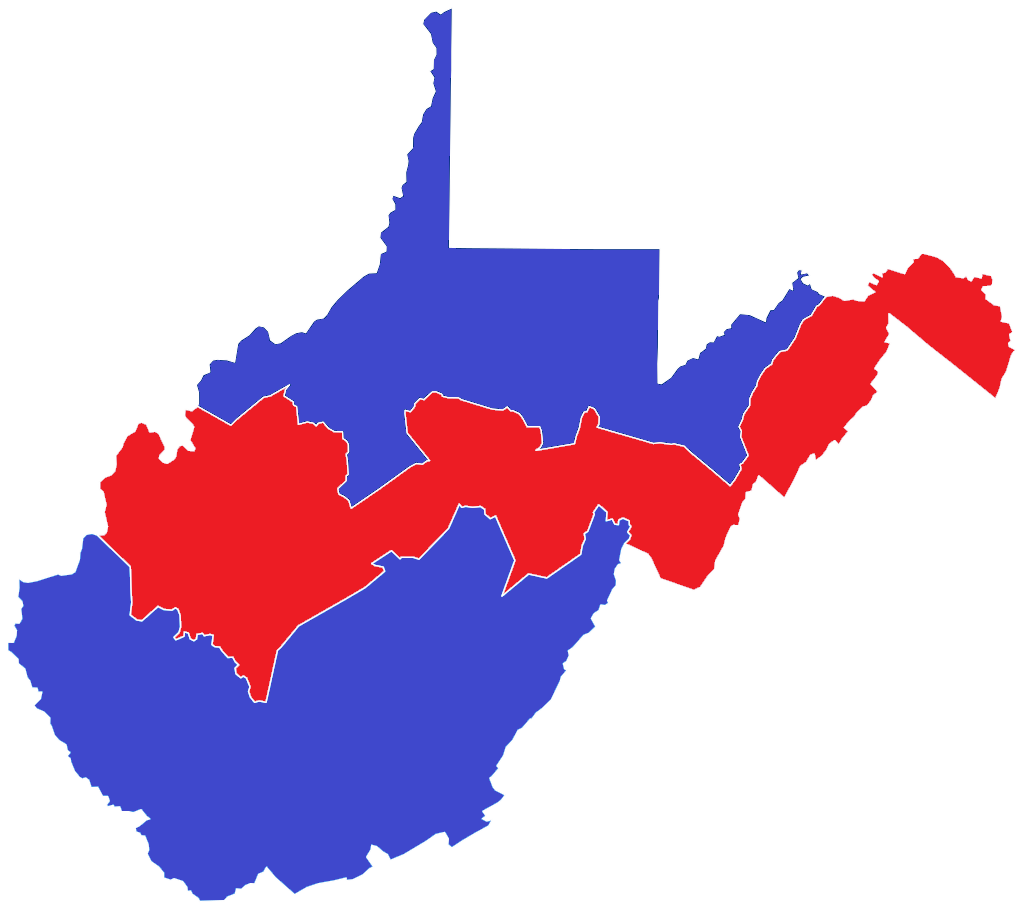
2006

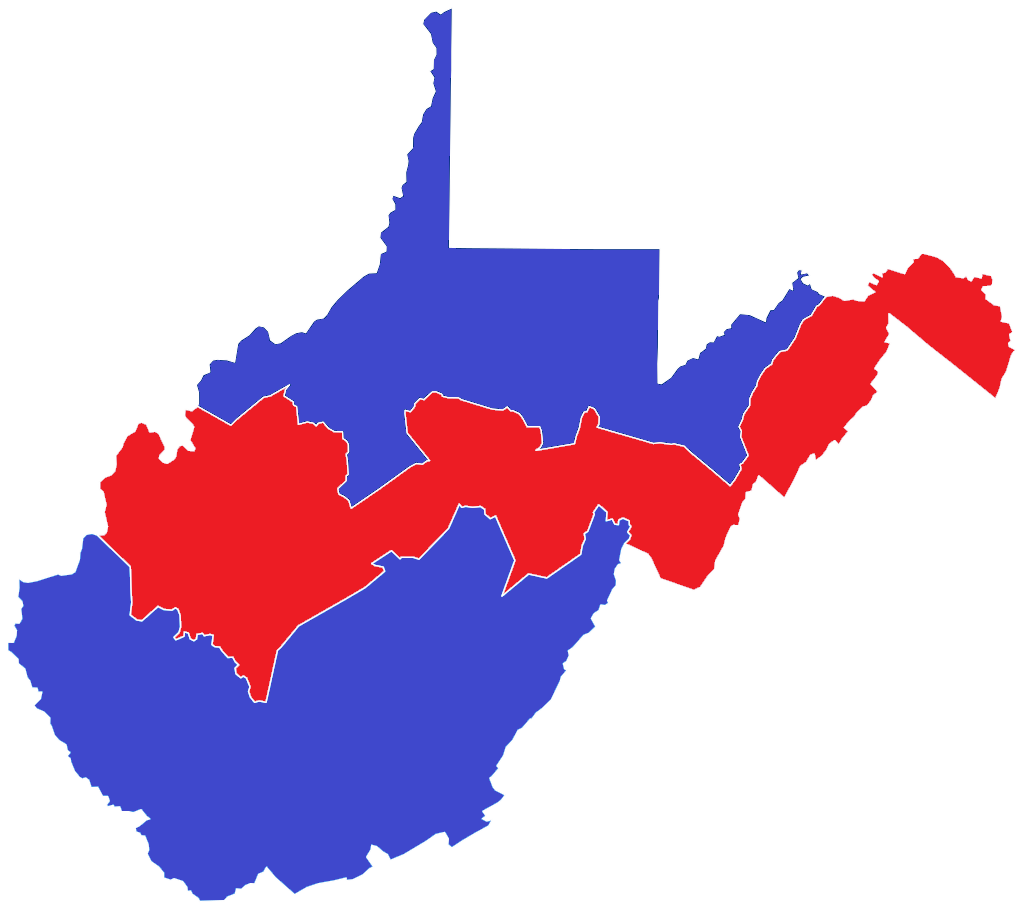
2008

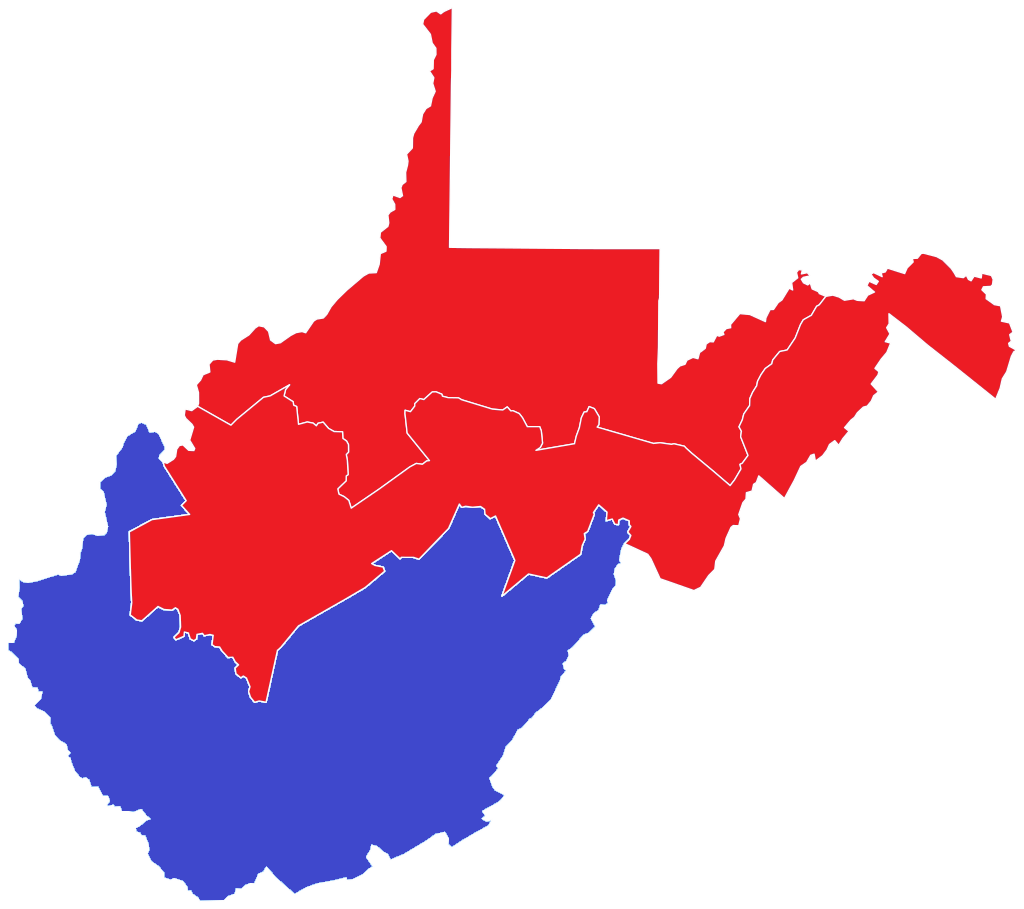
2010

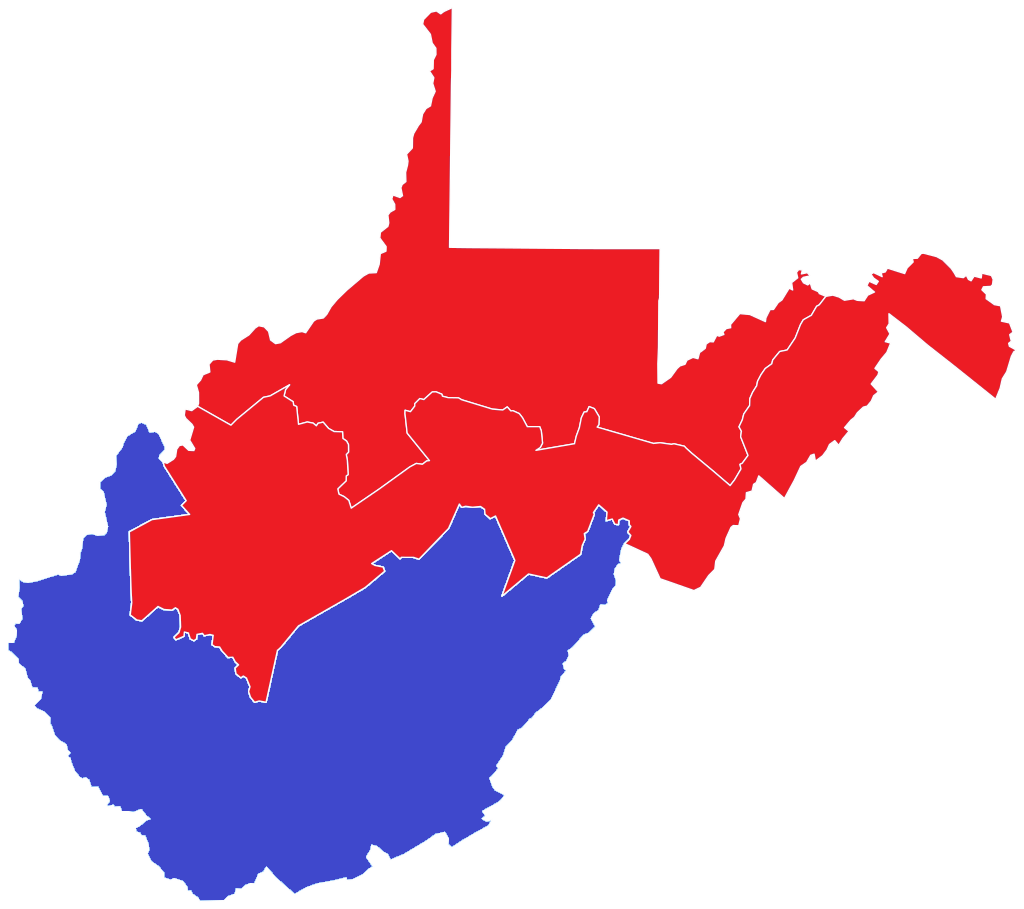
2012

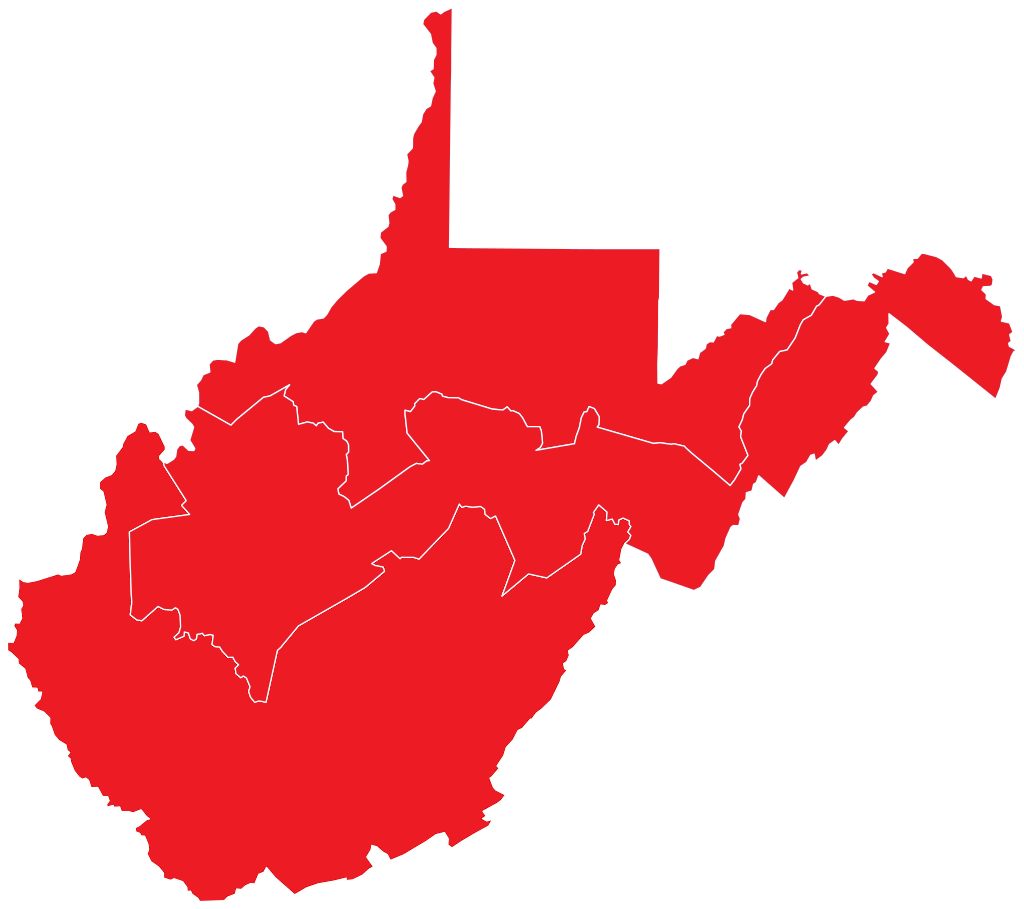
2014

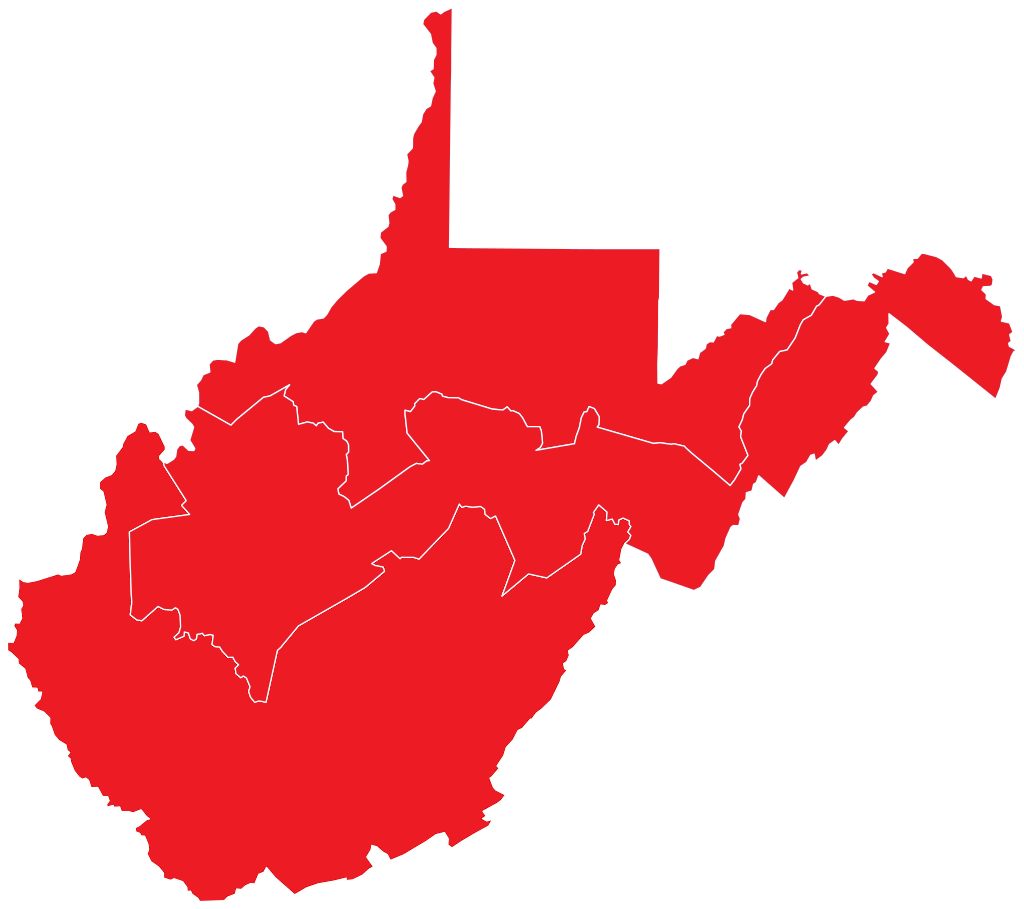
2016

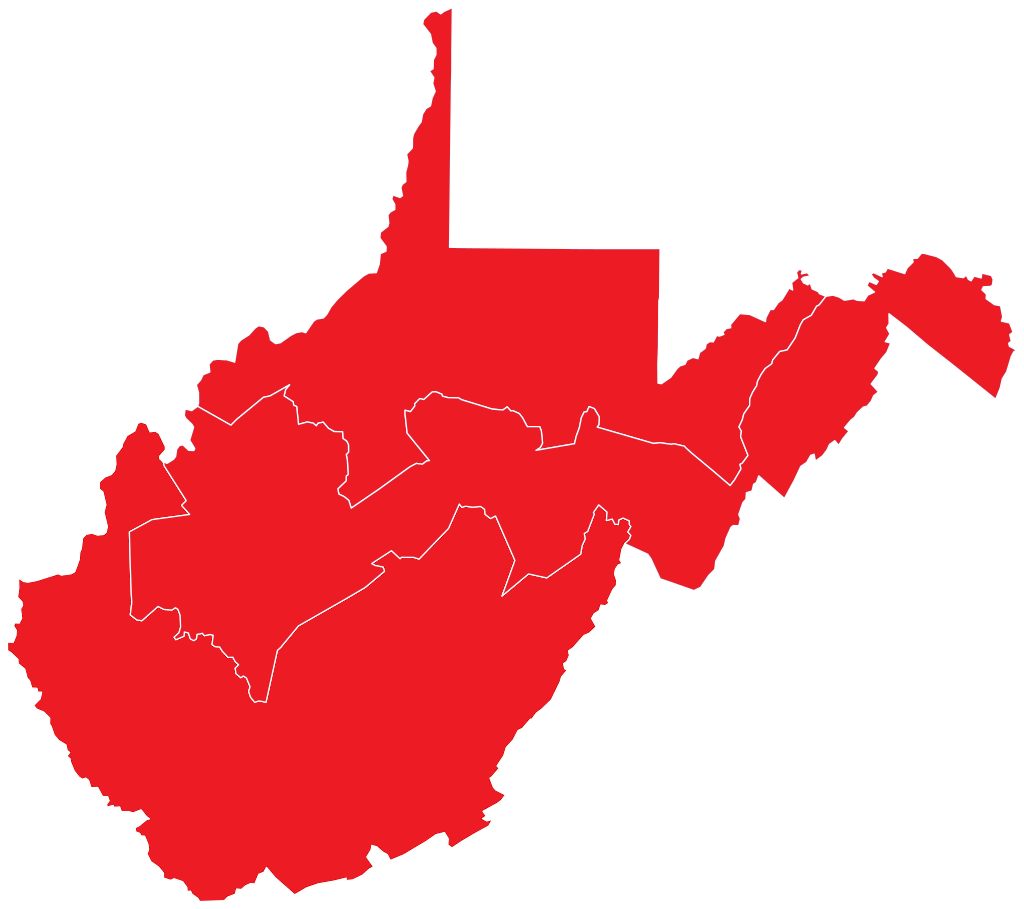
2018

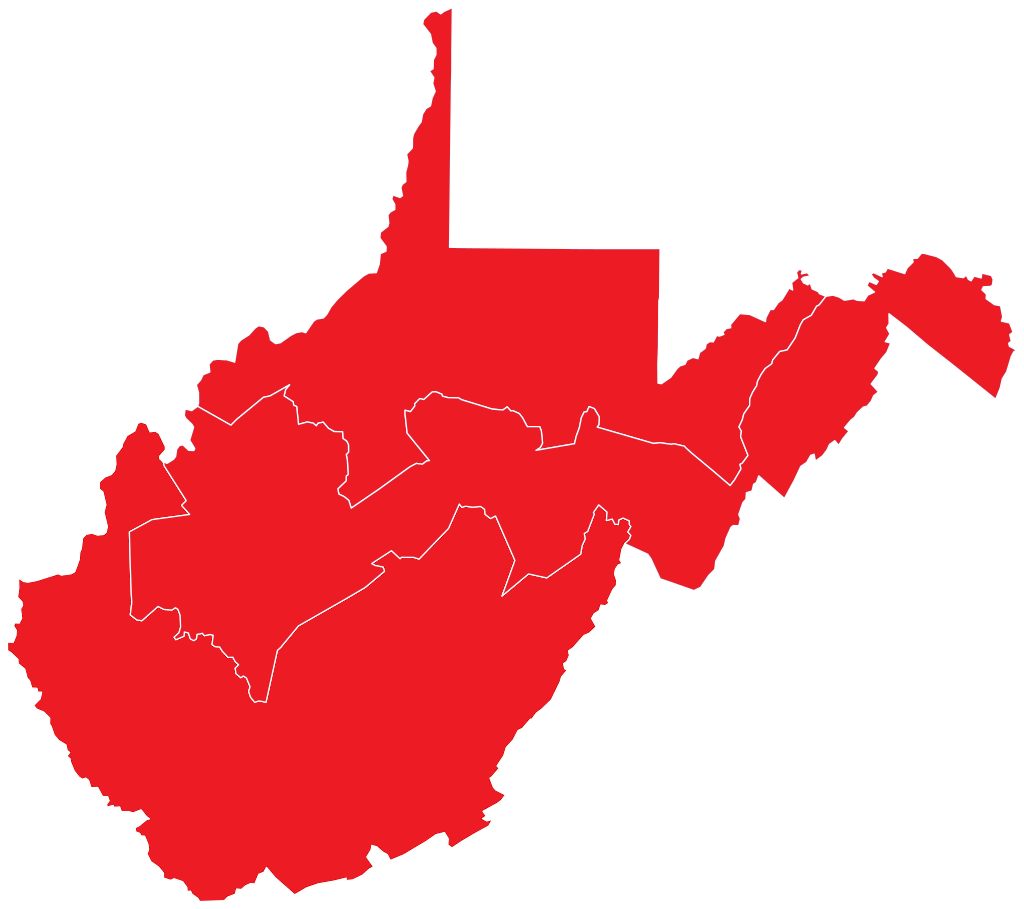
2020

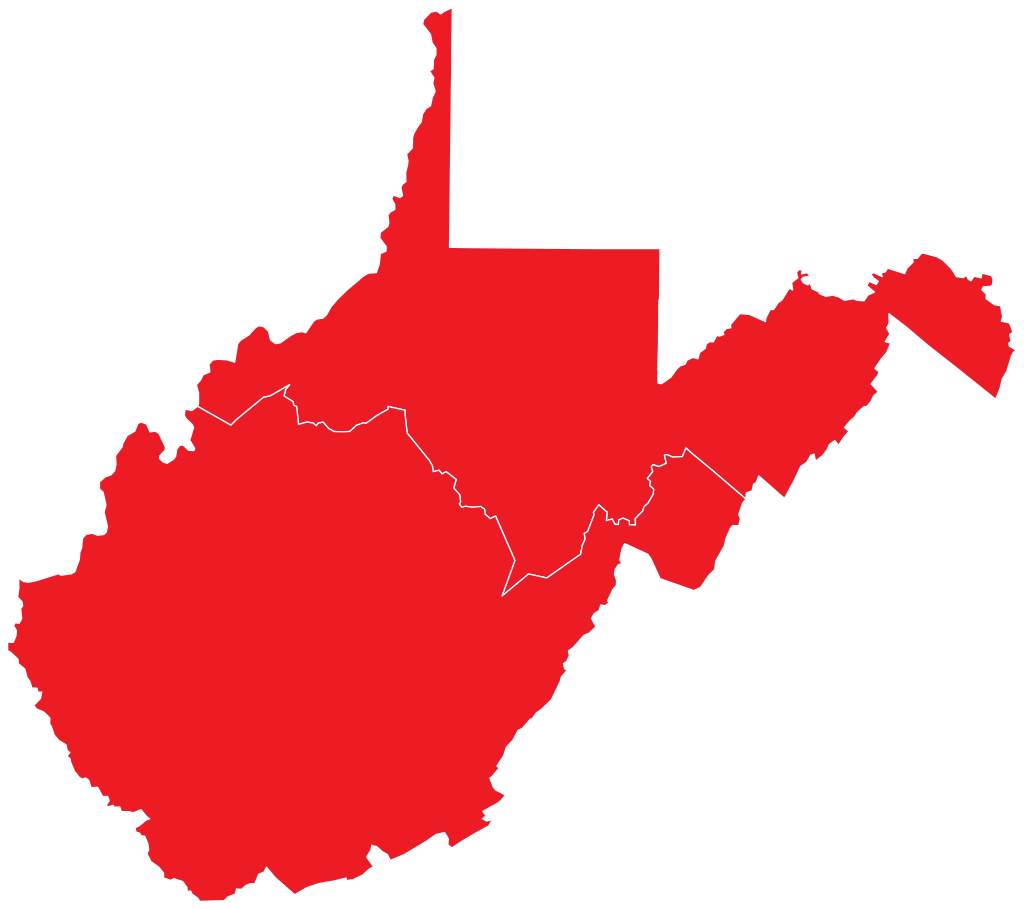
2022

== Historical and present district boundaries ==
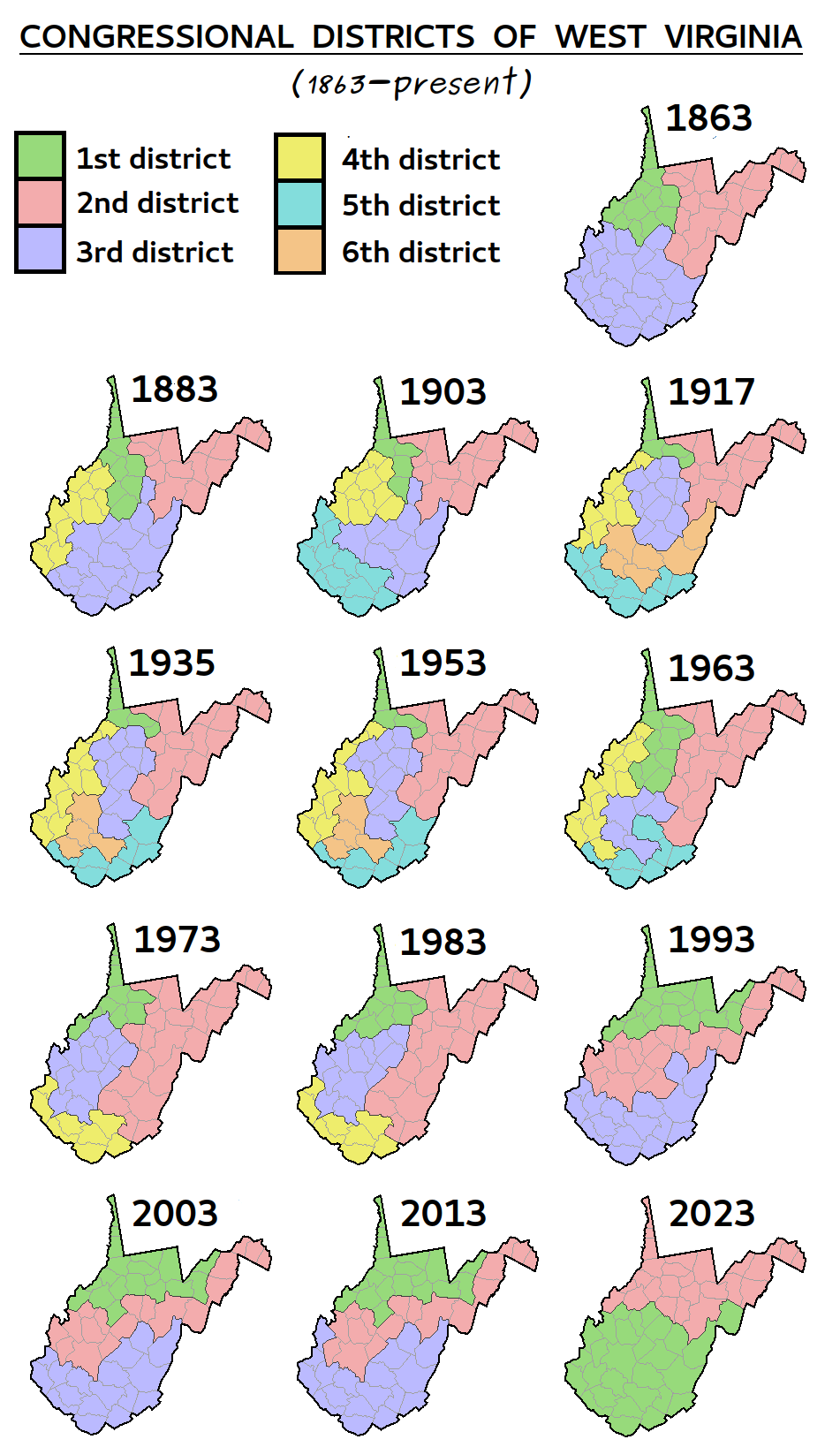
Congressional districts of West Virginia from 1863 to present

Table of United States congressional district boundary maps in the State of West Virginia, presented chronologically. All redistricting events that took place in West Virginia between 1973 and 2013 are shown.

Year	Statewide map
1973–1982	
1983–1992	
1993–2002	
2003–2013	
2013–2023	

== Obsolete districts ==
=== Third district ===
The 3rd district was eliminated by the 2020 United States census.

=== Fourth district ===
The 4th district was eliminated by the 1990 United States census.

=== Fifth district ===
The 5th district was eliminated by the 1970 United States census.

=== Sixth district ===
The 6th district was eliminated by the 1960 United States census.

=== At-large district ===
West Virginia's at-large congressional district existed between 1913 and 1917, during a period when the state failed to enact a redistricting plan that allowed for a new sixth district. Such a plan was adopted for the 1916 elections, making the at-large seat obsolete.

== See also ==
- List of United States congressional districts
