= Glenville State University =

Public University in Glenville, West Virginia, US

Coordinates: 38°56′9″N 80°50′1″W

- Former name: List: Glenville Branch of the West Virginia Normal School (1872–1900) Glenville State Normal School (1900–1931) Glenville State Teachers College (1931–1943) Glenville State College (1943–2022)
- Type: Public college
- Established: February 19, 1872; 154 years ago
- Accreditation: HLC
- Academic affiliations: WVHEPC
- President: Mark Manchin
- Students: 1,582
- Location: Glenville, West Virginia, United States
- Campus: 325 acres (1.32 km^{2}); Remote town
- Newspaper: The Phoenix
- Colors: Blue and white
- Nickname: Pioneers
- Sporting affiliations: NCAA Division II - MEC
- Mascot: Pioneer
- Website: glenville.edu
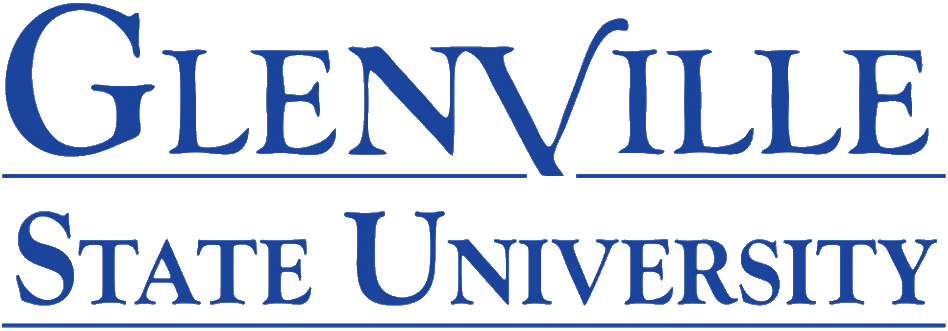

Glenville State University (GSU) is a public college in Glenville, West Virginia, United States.

== History ==
Glenville State University was founded in 1872 as a branch of West Virginia Normal School. It became known as "Glenville State Normal School". It served the higher education needs of central West Virginia. By 1910, the college enrollment had exceeded the population of Glenville and grew into a full four-year college by 1931.

The Glenville State College Alumni Center, known as the John E. Arbuckle House, was listed on the National Register of Historic Places in 1991.

On February 22, 2022, legislators changed the name of the institution from Glenville State College, which it had been known as since 1943, to Glenville State University.

== Academics ==
Undergraduate demographics as of Fall 2023
Race and ethnicity	Total
American Indian/Alaska Native	1%
White	77%
Black	13%
International student	4%
Hispanic	2%
Two or more races	2%
Asian	1%
Unknown	1%
Economic diversity
Low-income (Note: The percentage of students who received an income-based federal Pell grant intended for low-income students.)	57%
Affluent (Note: The percentage of students who are a part of the American middle class at the bare minimum.)	43%

The college awards bachelor's degrees, associate degrees, master's degrees, and certificates.

== Athletics ==
In athletics, the school's sports teams are known as Pioneers and Lady Pioneers, and they compete in the Mountain East Conference. They have teams in football, basketball, track and field, softball, golf, baseball, cross country running, acrobatics & tumbling, and volleyball and men's wrestling.

The women's basketball team won the NCAA Division II National Championship in 2022. Their head coach Kim Stephens was then named the Women's Basketball Coaches Association (WBCA) National Coach of the Year in Division II. Stephens was also selected as the 2022 recipient of the Fufari Award, which recognizes the college coach of the year for the state of West Virginia, an award which she also won in 2019. The team previously competed in the West Virginia Intercollegiate Athletic Conference, which disbanded following the 2012–13 season.

== Notable alumni ==
- Gray Barker, writer best known for his books about UFOs and other paranormal phenomena
- W. E. Blackhurst, author and a lifelong resident of the Cass, West Virginia community
- Brent Boggs, former member of West Virginia House of Delegates
- Scott Cadle, former member of West Virginia House of Delegates
- Kim Caldwell, collegiate basketball coach
- Craig Drennen, artist best known for his ongoing long-term Timon of Athens project, for which he has produced paintings, drawings, prints, videos, performances, and sculptures.
- Lloyd Hartman Elliott, former president of the George Washington University and the University of Maine
- David Evans, former West Virginia House of Delegates
- Ed Evans, former member of West Virginia House of Delegates
- Audeen W. Fentiman, engineer, and Crowley Family Professor in Engineering Education at Purdue University
- Cam Henderson, former college athletics administrator for Marshall University
- John Kee, former member of United States House of Representatives
- John R. Kelly, former member of West Virginia House of Delegates
- Todd Longanacre, former member of West Virginia House of Delegates
- Howard Justus McGinnis, former president of East Carolina University
- Bob Mollohan, former member of United States House of Representatives
- Dave Pethtel, former member of West Virginia House of Delegates
- Harmonia Rosales, painter best known for The Creation of God
- William Allison Shimer, former president of Marietta College
- Bob Sowards, former professional golfer
- David Stover, current member of West Virginia Senate
- David Sypolt, former member of West Virginia Senate
- Tim Viens, Former place kicker for the Glenville State Pioneers, and NASCAR driver and team owner
- Steve Westfall, current member of West Virginia House of Delegates
- Jay Wolfe, former member of West Virginia Senate
- John M. Wolverton, former member of United States House of Representatives
- Adam Young, former member of West Virginia House of Delegates

== See also ==
- List of presidents and principals of Glenville State University
