= Clover Lick, West Virginia =

Unincorporated community in West Virginia, United States

- Unincorporated community
- Location within West Virginia Location within the United States
- Coordinates: 38°19′51″N 79°58′15″W
- Country: United States
- State: West Virginia
- County: Pocahontas
- Elevation: 2,300 ft (700 m)
- Time zone: UTC-5 (Eastern (EST))
  - Summer (DST): UTC-4 (EDT)
- ZIP code: 24929
- Area code: 304
- GNIS feature ID: 1550730

Clover Lick is an unincorporated community in Pocahontas County, West Virginia, United States. Clover Lick is located along the Greenbrier River, 10 miles (16 km) northeast of Marlinton. The community is home to the Clover Lick Train Depot, which sits along the Greenbrier River Trail at Milepost 71.2. Clover Lick was founded in the early 1900s as a place to board trains traveling along the Greenbrier River.
