= West Virginia's 1st congressional district =

U.S. House district for West Virginia

Coordinates: 39°22′55″N 80°16′07″W

- Interactive map of district boundaries since January 3, 2023
- Representative: Carol Miller; R–Huntington
- Population (2025): 855,322
- Median household income: $55,412
- Ethnicity: 89.9% White; 4.1% Black; 3.7% Two or more races; 1.3% Hispanic; 0.7% Asian; 0.4% other
- Cook PVI: R+22

West Virginia's 1st congressional district is currently located in the southern half of the US state and includes Charleston and Huntington, as well as the smaller cities of Beckley, Bluefield, Lewisburg, Princeton, and White Sulphur Springs.

Responding to the census results, the state legislature adopted a new map for the 2022 elections and the following 10 years. It abandoned the practice used since the formation of the state of starting the numbering in the north, and rather divided the state in a northern and southern district, with the 1st being the more southerly one. The new 1st district contains the counties of Boone, Braxton, Cabell, Calhoun, Clay, Fayette, Gilmer, Greenbrier, Jackson, Kanawha, Lincoln, Logan, Mason, McDowell, Mercer, Mingo, Monroe, Nicholas, Pendleton, Pocahontas, Putnam, Raleigh, Roane, Summers, Wayne, Webster, Wirt, and Wyoming. For all intents and purposes, it was the successor to the 3rd district, and its congresswoman, Carol Miller, became the de facto incumbent in this new district. The state's other congressmen, Republicans David McKinley and Alex Mooney, were both drawn into the new 2nd district. All three ran for re-election. Miller was easily nominated in the Republican primary held May 10, 2022, while former 1st district congressman David McKinley was soundly defeated by 2nd district congressman Alex Mooney. Both Republicans were easily elected in November.

In its previous incarnation, the 1st covered the northern part of the state, and was historically the most regularly drawn district in the state. From 1953 to 2023, it was represented by only four men: Bob Mollohan (D) (1953–1957), former Governor Arch Moore, Jr. (R) (1957–1969), Bob Mollohan again (1969–1983), Alan Mollohan (1983–2011) and McKinley (2011-2023).

Despite the lack of turnover in the congressional seat, historically the 1st was not safe for either party. The cities are ancestrally Democratic strongholds, while the rural areas were much more conservative and had a tendency to swing Republican more often. As late as 2014, state legislators were roughly split between both parties.

For most of the 20th century, the Democratic vote in the cities was enough to keep the district in Democratic hands. However, West Virginia Democrats tend to be somewhat more socially conservative than their counterparts in the rest of the nation, and the district has been swept up in the growing Republican trend in the state at the national level. No Democrat since Bill Clinton (who did so by a plurality in a three-way race) has carried the 1st district in presidential elections. George W. Bush carried the district both times in 2000 with 54% of the vote and 2004 with 58% of the vote. John McCain carried the district in 2008 with 56.77% of the vote while Barack Obama received 41.51%.

== History ==
Prior to the 2020 redistricting, the first district had always been anchored in Wheeling, and as such had always included Hancock, Brooke, Ohio, Marshall, and Wetzel counties–the five counties usually reckoned as the Northern Panhandle. The original 1863 districting included also Tyler, Pleasants, Doddridge, Harrison, Ritchie, Wood, Wirt, Gilmer, Calhoun and Lewis counties. It was essentially the successor of Virginia's 11th congressional district.

In 1882, the counties of Tyler, Doddridge, Harrison, Gilmer, Lewis and Braxton were added to the core counties. In 1902, the core counties were joined by Marion, Harrison, and Lewis counties. In the 1916 redistricting it included only the five core counties and Marion and Taylor. The district was unchanged in the 1934 and 1954 redistrictings. In 1962, Braxton, Calhoun, Doddridge, Gilmer, Harrison, Lewis, Marion and Taylor joined the five core counties. The 1972 redistricting added Tyler, Pleasants, and Woods and deleted Taylor. The 1982 redistricting added Taylor back to the district.

For 1992 the district consisted of Barbour, Brooke, Doddridge, Grant, Hancock, Harrison, Marion, Marshall, Mineral, Monongalia, Ohio, Pleasants, Preston, Ritchie, Taylor, Tucker, Tyler, Wetzel and Wood counties. In 2002 Gilmer was added. For the election cycle that began in 2012 the district was unchanged.

For the 2020 census, the legislature abandoned the practice of numbering the districts from north to south. The 1st was now the more southerly one, consisting of Boone, Braxton, Cabell, Calhoun, Clay, Fayette, Gilmer, Greenbrier, Jackson, Kanawha, Lincoln, Logan, Mason, McDowell, Mercer, Mingo, Monroe, Nicholas, Pendleton, Pocahontas, Putnam, Raleigh, Roane, Summers, Wayne, Webster, Wirt, and Wyoming counties.

== Composition ==
For the 118th and successive Congresses (based on redistricting following the 2020 census), the district contains all of the following counties:

| # | County | Seat | Population |
|---|---|---|---|
| 5 | Boone | Madison | 20,576 |
| 7 | Braxton | Sutton | 12,162 |
| 11 | Cabell | Huntington | 92,082 |
| 13 | Calhoun | Grantsville | 5,959 |
| 15 | Clay | Clay | 7,783 |
| 19 | Fayette | Fayetteville | 39,072 |
| 21 | Gilmer | Glenville | 7,254 |
| 25 | Greenbrier | Lewisburg | 32,149 |
| 35 | Jackson | Ripley | 27,593 |
| 39 | Kanawha | Charleston | 174,805 |
| 43 | Lincoln | Hamlin | 19,701 |
| 45 | Logan | Logan | 30,827 |
| 47 | McDowell | Welch | 17,439 |
| 53 | Mason | Point Pleasant | 24,765 |
| 55 | Mercer | Princeton | 58,057 |
| 59 | Mingo | Williamson | 22,023 |
| 63 | Monroe | Union | 12,382 |
| 67 | Nicholas | Summersville | 24,169 |
| 71 | Pendleton | Franklin | 6,029 |
| 75 | Pocahontas | Marlinton | 7,765 |
| 79 | Putnam | Winfield | 56,962 |
| 81 | Raleigh | Beckley | 72,356 |
| 87 | Roane | Spencer | 13,743 |
| 89 | Summers | Hinton | 11,581 |
| 99 | Wayne | Wayne | 37,686 |
| 101 | Webster | Webster Springs | 8,045 |
| 105 | Wirt | Elizabeth | 5,000 |
| 109 | Wyoming | Pineville | 20,277 |

== Recent election results from statewide races ==
| Year | Office | Results |
|---|---|---|
| 2008 | President | McCain 54% - 43% |
| 2012 | President | Romney 64% - 36% |
| 2016 | President | Trump 70% - 26% |
| 2016 | Governor | Justice 55% - 37% |
| 2016 | Attorney General | Morrisey 49% - 47% |
| 2018 | Senate | Manchin 52% - 45% |
| 2020 | President | Trump 70% - 29% |
| 2020 | Senate | Moore Capito 71% - 27% |
| 2020 | Governor | Justice 64% - 31% |
| 2020 | Attorney General | Morrisey 63% - 37% |
| 2020 | Auditor | McCuskey 67% - 33% |
| 2020 | Secretary of State | Warner 58% - 42% |
| 2020 | Treasurer | Moore 52% - 48% |
| 2024 | President | Trump 71% - 27% |
| 2024 | Senate | Justice 70% - 27% |
| 2024 | Governor | Morrisey 60% - 34% |
| 2024 | Attorney General | McCuskey 72% - 28% |
| 2024 | Auditor | Hunt 70% - 30% |
| 2024 | Secretary of State | Warner 72% - 28% |

== List of members representing the district ==
| Member | Party | Years | Cong ress | Electoral history |
|---|---|---|---|---|
District established December 17, 1863
| Jacob B. Blair (Parkersburg) | Union | December 17, 1863 – March 3, 1865 | 38th | Elected in 1863. Retired. |
| Chester D. Hubbard (Wheeling) | Union | March 4, 1865 – March 3, 1867 | 39th 40th | Elected in 1864. Re-elected in 1866. Lost renomination. |
| Chester D. Hubbard (Wheeling) | Republican | March 4, 1867 – March 3, 1869 | 39th 40th | Elected in 1864. Re-elected in 1866. Lost renomination. |
| Isaac H. Duval (Wellsburg) | Republican | March 4, 1869 – March 3, 1871 | 41st | Elected in 1868. Retired. |
| John James Davis (Clarksburg) | Democratic | March 4, 1871 – March 3, 1873 | 42nd 43rd | Elected in 1870. Re-elected in 1872. Retired. |
| John James Davis (Clarksburg) | Independent Democratic | March 4, 1873 – March 3, 1875 | 42nd 43rd | Elected in 1870. Re-elected in 1872. Retired. |
| Benjamin Wilson (Clarksburg) | Democratic | March 4, 1875 – March 3, 1883 | 44th 45th 46th 47th | Elected in 1874. Re-elected in 1876. Re-elected in 1878. Re-elected in 1880. Retired. |
| Nathan Goff Jr. (Clarksburg) | Republican | March 4, 1883 – March 3, 1889 | 48th 49th 50th | Elected in 1882. Re-elected in 1884. Re-elected in 1886. Retired. |
| John O. Pendleton (Wheeling) | Democratic | March 4, 1889 – February 26, 1890 | 51st | Elected in 1888. Lost contested election. |
| George W. Atkinson (Wheeling) | Republican | February 26, 1890 – March 3, 1891 | 51st | Won contested election. Retired. |
| John O. Pendleton (Wheeling) | Democratic | March 4, 1891 – March 3, 1895 | 52nd 53rd | Elected in 1890. Re-elected in 1892. Lost renomination. |
| Blackburn B. Dovener (Wheeling) | Republican | March 4, 1895 – March 3, 1907 | 54th 55th 56th 57th 58th 59th | Elected in 1894. Re-elected in 1896. Re-elected in 1898. Re-elected in 1900. Re-elected in 1902. Re-elected in 1904. Lost renomination. |
| William Pallister Hubbard (Wheeling) | Republican | March 4, 1907 – March 3, 1911 | 60th 61st | Elected in 1906. Re-elected in 1908. Retired. |
| John W. Davis (Clarksburg) | Democratic | March 4, 1911 – August 29, 1913 | 62nd 63rd | Elected in 1910. Re-elected in 1912. Resigned to become U.S. Solicitor General. |
| Vacant | | August 29, 1913 – October 14, 1913 | 63rd | |
| Matthew M. Neely (Fairmont) | Democratic | October 14, 1913 – March 3, 1921 | 63rd 64th 65th 66th | Elected to finish Davis's term. Re-elected in 1914. Re-elected in 1916. Re-elected in 1918. Lost re-election. |
| Benjamin L. Rosenbloom (Wheeling) | Republican | March 4, 1921 – March 3, 1925 | 67th 68th | Elected in 1920. Re-elected in 1922. Retired to run for U.S. senator. |
| Carl G. Bachmann (Wheeling) | Republican | March 4, 1925 – March 3, 1933 | 69th 70th 71st 72nd | Elected in 1924. Re-elected in 1926. Re-elected in 1928. Re-elected in 1930. Lost re-election. |
| Robert L. Ramsay (Follansbee) | Democratic | March 4, 1933 – January 3, 1939 | 73rd 74th 75th | Elected in 1932. Re-elected in 1934. Re-elected in 1936. Lost re-election. |
| A. C. Schiffler (Wheeling) | Republican | January 3, 1939 – January 3, 1941 | 76th | Elected in 1938. Lost re-election. |
| Robert L. Ramsay (Follansbee) | Democratic | January 3, 1941 – January 3, 1943 | 77th | Elected in 1940. Lost re-election. |
| A. C. Schiffler (Wheeling) | Republican | January 3, 1943 – January 3, 1945 | 78th | Elected in 1942. Lost re-election. |
| Matthew M. Neely (Fairmont) | Democratic | January 3, 1945 – January 3, 1947 | 79th | Elected in 1944. Lost re-election. |
| Francis J. Love (Wheeling) | Republican | January 3, 1947 – January 3, 1949 | 80th | Elected in 1946. Lost re-election. |
| Robert L. Ramsay (Follansbee) | Democratic | January 3, 1949 – January 3, 1953 | 81st 82nd | Elected in 1948. Re-elected in 1950. Lost renomination. |
| Bob Mollohan (Fairmont) | Democratic | January 3, 1953 – January 3, 1957 | 83rd 84th | Elected in 1952. Re-elected in 1954. Retired to run for governor. |
| Arch A. Moore Jr. (Glen Dale) | Republican | January 3, 1957 – January 3, 1969 | 85th 86th 87th 88th 89th 90th | Elected in 1956. Re-elected in 1958. Re-elected in 1960. Re-elected in 1962. Re-elected in 1964. Re-elected in 1966. Retired to run for governor. |
| Bob Mollohan (Fairmont) | Democratic | January 3, 1969 – January 3, 1983 | 91st 92nd 93rd 94th 95th 96th 97th | Elected in 1968. Re-elected in 1970. Re-elected in 1972. Re-elected in 1974. Re-elected in 1976. Re-elected in 1978. Re-elected in 1980. Retired. |
| Alan Mollohan (Fairmont) | Democratic | January 3, 1983 – January 3, 2011 | 98th 99th 100th 101st 102nd 103rd 104th 105th 106th 107th 108th 109th 110th 111th | Elected in 1982. Re-elected in 1984. Re-elected in 1986. Re-elected in 1988. Re-elected in 1990. Re-elected in 1992. Re-elected in 1994. Re-elected in 1996. Re-elected in 1998. Re-elected in 2000. Re-elected in 2002. Re-elected in 2004. Re-elected in 2006. Re-elected in 2008. Lost renomination. |
| David McKinley (Wheeling) | Republican | January 3, 2011 – January 3, 2023 | 112th 113th 114th 115th 116th 117th | Elected in 2010. Re-elected in 2012. Re-elected in 2014. Re-elected in 2016. Re-elected in 2018. Re-elected in 2020. Redistricted to the 2nd district and lost renomination. |
| Carol Miller (Huntington) | Republican | January 3, 2023 – present | 118th 119th | Redistricted from the 3rd district and re-elected in 2022. Re-elected in 2024. Re-elected in 2026. |

== Recent election results ==
=== 2000s ===
2000 United States House of Representatives elections in West Virginia
| Party | Candidate | Votes | % |
|---|---|---|---|
| Democratic | Alan Mollohan (incumbent) | 170,974 | 87.78 |
| Libertarian | Richard Kerr | 23,797 | 12.22 |
| Total votes | | 194,771 | 100.00 |
| Democratic hold | | | |

2002 United States House of Representatives elections in West Virginia
| Party | Candidate | Votes | % |
|---|---|---|---|
| Democratic | Alan Mollohan (incumbent) | 110,941 | 99.71 |
| write-ins | | 320 | 0.29 |
| Total votes | | 111,261 | 100.00 |
| Democratic hold | | | |

2004 United States House of Representatives elections in West Virginia
| Party | Candidate | Votes | % |
|---|---|---|---|
| Democratic | Alan Mollohan (incumbent) | 166,583 | 67.77 |
| Republican | Chris Wakim | 79,196 | 32.22 |
| Total votes | | 245,779 | 100.00 |
| Democratic hold | | | |

2006 United States House of Representatives elections in West Virginia
| Party | Candidate | Votes | % |
|---|---|---|---|
| Democratic | Alan Mollohan (incumbent) | 100,939 | 64.29 |
| Republican | Chris Wakim | 55,963 | 35.65 |
| Write-ins | | 98 | 0.06 |
| Total votes | | 157,000 | 100.00 |
| Democratic hold | | | |

2008 United States House of Representatives elections in West Virginia
| Party | Candidate | Votes | % |
|---|---|---|---|
| Democratic | Alan Mollohan (incumbent) | 187,734 | 99.93 |
| Write-ins | | 130 | 0.07 |
| Total votes | | 187,864 | 100.00 |
| Democratic hold | | | |

=== 2010s ===
2010 United States House of Representatives elections in West Virginia
| Party | Candidate | Votes | % |
|---|---|---|---|
| Republican | David McKinley | 90,660 | 50.40 |
| Democratic | Mike Oliverio | 89,220 | 49.60 |
| Total votes | | 179,880 | 100.00 |
| Republican gain from Democratic | | | |

2012 United States House of Representatives elections in West Virginia
| Party | Candidate | Votes | % |
|---|---|---|---|
| Republican | David McKinley (incumbent) | 133,809 | 62.5 |
| Democratic | Sue Thorn | 80,342 | 37.5 |
| Total votes | | 214,151 | 100.0 |
| Republican hold | | | |

2014 United States House of Representatives elections in West Virginia
| Party | Candidate | Votes | % |
|---|---|---|---|
| Republican | David McKinley (incumbent) | 92,491 | 64.0 |
| Democratic | Glen Gainer III | 52,109 | 36.0 |
| Total votes | | 144,600 | 100.0 |
| Republican hold | | | |

2016 United States House of Representatives elections in West Virginia
| Party | Candidate | Votes | % |
|---|---|---|---|
| Republican | David McKinley (incumbent) | 163,469 | 69.0 |
| Democratic | Mike Manypenny | 73,534 | 31.0 |
| Total votes | | 237,003 | 100.0 |
| Republican hold | | | |

2018 United States House of Representatives elections in West Virginia
| Party | Candidate | Votes | % |
|---|---|---|---|
| Republican | David McKinley (incumbent) | 127,997 | 64.6 |
| Democratic | Kendra Fershee | 70,217 | 35.4 |
| Total votes | | 198,214 | 100.0 |
| Republican hold | | | |

=== 2020s ===
2020 United States House of Representatives elections in West Virginia
| Party | Candidate | Votes | % |
|---|---|---|---|
| Republican | David McKinley (incumbent) | 180,488 | 69.0 |
| Democratic | Natalie Cline | 81,177 | 31.0 |
| Total votes | | 261,665 | 100.0 |
| Republican hold | | | |

2022 United States House of Representatives elections in West Virginia
| Party | Candidate | Votes | % |
|---|---|---|---|
| Republican | Carol Miller (incumbent) | 151,511 | 66.7 |
| Democratic | Lacy Watson | 65,428 | 28.8 |
| Independent | Belinda Fox-Spencer | 10,257 | 4.5 |
| Total votes | | 227,196 | 100.0 |
| Republican hold | | | |

2024 United States House of Representatives elections in West Virginia
| Party | Candidate | Votes | % |
|---|---|---|---|
| Republican | Carol Miller (incumbent) | 228,491 | 66.4 |
| Democratic | Chris Reed | 90,038 | 26.1 |
| Independent | Wes Holden | 25,616 | 7.4 |
| Write-in | | 174 | 0.1 |
| Total votes | | 344,319 | 100.0 |
| Republican hold | | | |

== Historical district boundaries ==
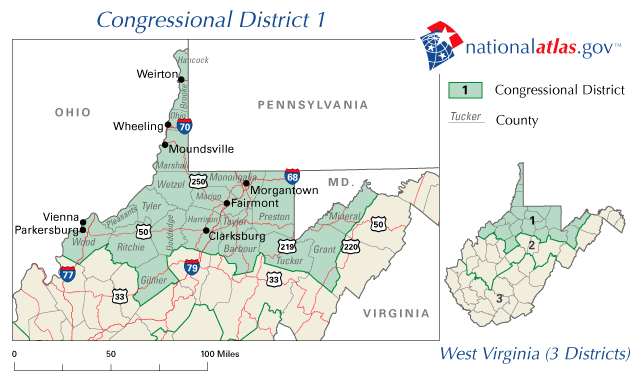
2003 - 2013

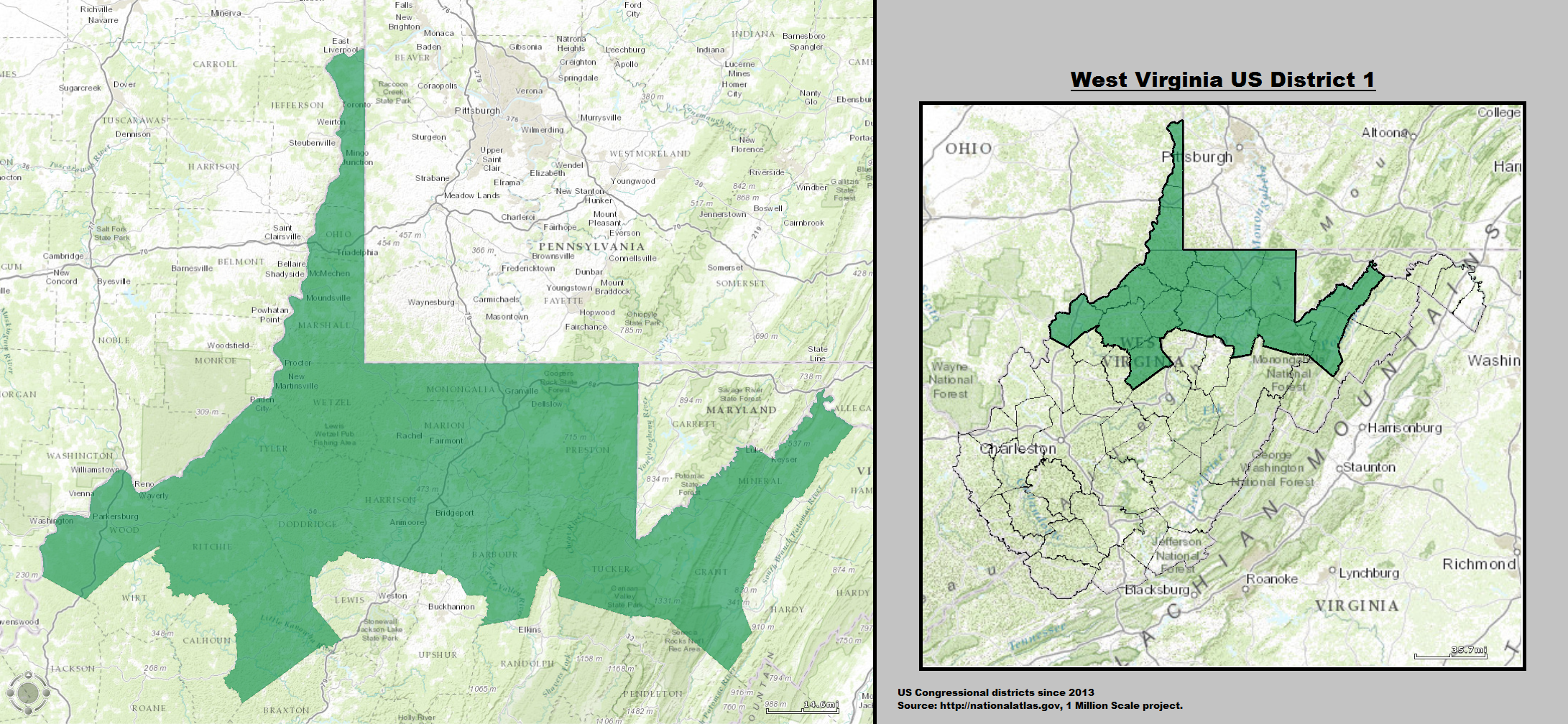
2013 - 2023

== See also ==
- West Virginia's congressional districts
- List of United States congressional districts
