= West Virginia's 2nd congressional district =

U.S. House district for West Virginia

Coordinates: 38°50′20″N 80°10′26″W

- Interactive map of district boundaries since January 3, 2023
- Representative: Riley Moore; R–Harpers Ferry
- Population (2025): 910,825
- Median household income: $67,730
- Ethnicity: 88.4% White; 4.4% Two or more races; 3.2% Black; 2.6% Hispanic; 1.0% Asian; 0.5% other
- Cook PVI: R+20

West Virginia's 2nd congressional district consists of the northern half of the state, as well as both the Northern Panhandle and most of Eastern Panhandle. It includes Martinsburg, Morgantown, Parkersburg, and Wheeling, along with the smaller cities of Bridgeport, Charles Town, Clarksburg, Fairmont, and Moundsville.

Republican Riley Moore is the representative of the district.

The legislature placed both the previous 1st district congressman David McKinley and the previous 2nd district congressman Alex Mooney in the new 2nd district, setting up a Republican primary race between Mooney and McKinley. The new 2nd was geographically and demographically more McKinley's district, making McKinley the de facto incumbent. However, in the Republican Primary held on May 10, 2022, Mooney, who was endorsed by Donald Trump, easily defeated McKinley, who was endorsed by Democrat Joe Manchin 54% to 36%, with three minor candidates receiving the balance. Mooney then easily won the general election.

== History ==
The second district as originally formed in 1863 included Taylor, Marion, Monongalia, Preston, Tucker, Barbour, Upshur, Webster, Pocahontas, Randolph, Pendleton, Hardy, Hampshire, Berkeley, and Morgan counties (Jefferson county's status in the state was still in dispute, and Grant and Mineral counties were still part of other counties, but the modern territory of all was also included). It was essentially the successor of Virginia's 10th congressional district. The district was unchanged for 1882.

In 1902, the district was changed to Monongalia, Preston, Tucker, Taylor, Barbour, Tucker, Randolph, Pendleton, Grant, Hardy, Mineral, Hampshire, Morgan, Berkeley, and Jefferson counties. The district was unchanged for 1916. Taylor was removed for 1934. The district was again unchanged for 1954. In 1962 Upshur, Webster, Pocahontas, and Greenbrier counties were added. In 1972, Lewis, Monroe, Summers, and Fayette were added. In 1982, Barbour was added.

1992 saw the district consist of Berkeley, Braxton, Calhoun, Clay, Glimer, Hampshire, Hardy, Jackson, Jefferson, Kanawha, Lewis, Mason, Morgan, Nicholas, Pendleton, Putnam, Randolph, Roane, Upshur, and Wirt counties. In 2002, Gilmer and Nicholas were removed and for the election cycle beginning in 2012, Mason was removed.

Responding to the 2020 census, the district was reconstituted to contain Barbour, Berkeley, Brooke, Doddridge, Grant, Hampshire, Hancock, Hardy, Harrison, Jefferson, Lewis, Marion, Marshall, Mineral, Monongalia, Morgan, Ohio, Pleasants, Preston, Randolph, Ritchie, Taylor, Tucker, Tyler, Upshur, Wetzel, and Wood.

== Composition ==
For the 118th and successive Congresses (based on redistricting following the 2020 census), the district contains all of the following counties:

#	County	Seat	Population
1	Barbour	Philippi	15,378
3	Berkeley	Martinsburg	132,440
9	Brooke	Wellsburg	21,373
17	Doddridge	West Union	7,680
23	Grant	Petersburg	10,921
27	Hampshire	Romney	23,649
29	Hancock	New Cumberland	28,145
31	Hardy	Moorefield	14,251
33	Harrison	Clarksburg	64,639
37	Jefferson	Charles Town	59,787
41	Lewis	Weston	16,500
49	Marion	Fairmont	55,807
51	Marshall	Moundsville	29,405
57	Mineral	Keyser	26,867
61	Monongalia	Morgantown	107,718
65	Morgan	Berkeley Springs	17,649
69	Ohio	Wheeling	41,194
73	Pleasants	St. Marys	7,428
77	Preston	Kingwood	34,099
83	Randolph	Elkins	27,350
85	Ritchie	Harrisville	8,167
91	Taylor	Grafton	16,388
93	Tucker	Parsons	6,604
95	Tyler	Middlebourne	7,919
97	Upshur	Buckhannon	23,529
103	Wetzel	New Martinsville	13,890
107	Wood	Parkersburg	83,052

== Recent election results from statewide races ==
Year	Office	Results
2008	President	McCain 56% - 41%
2012	President	Romney 63% - 37%
2016	President	Trump 68% - 27%
2016	Governor	Cole 48% - 43%
2016	Attorney General	Morrisey 55% - 37%
2018	Senate	Morrisey 48% - 47%
2020	President	Trump 68% - 31%
2020	Senate	Moore Capito 69% - 27%
2020	Governor	Justice 63% - 29%
2020	Attorney General	Morrisey 65% - 35%
2020	Auditor	McCuskey 67% - 33%
2020	Secretary of State	Warner 59% - 41%
2020	Treasurer	Moore 61% - 39%
2024	President	Trump 69% - 29%
2024	Senate	Justice 68% - 29%
2024	Governor	Morrisey 63% - 30%
2024	Attorney General	McCuskey 68% - 32%
2024	Auditor	Hunt 68% - 32%
2024	Secretary of State	Warner 70% - 30%

== List of members representing the district ==
Member	Party	Dates	Cong ress	Electoral history
District established December 7, 1863
William G. Brown Sr. (Kingwood)	Union	December 7, 1863 – March 3, 1865	38th	Elected in 1863. Retired.
George R. Latham (Grafton)	Union	March 4, 1865 – March 3, 1867	39th	Elected in 1864. Retired.
Bethuel Kitchen (Martinsburg)	Republican	March 4, 1867 – March 3, 1869	40th	Elected in 1866. Retired.
James McGrew (Kingwood)	Republican	March 4, 1869 – March 3, 1873	41st 42nd	Elected in 1868. Re-elected in 1870. Retired.
John Hagans (Morgantown)	Republican	March 4, 1873 – March 3, 1875	43rd	Elected in 1872. Lost re-election as an independent.
Charles J. Faulkner (Martinsburg)	Democratic	March 4, 1875 – March 3, 1877	44th	Elected in 1874. Retired to run for U.S. senator.
Benjamin F. Martin (Pruntytown)	Democratic	March 4, 1877 – March 3, 1881	45th 46th	Elected in 1876. Re-elected in 1878. Lost renomination.
John B. Hoge (Martinsburg)	Democratic	March 4, 1881 – March 3, 1883	47th	Elected in 1880. Retired.
William Lyne Wilson (Charles Town)	Democratic	March 4, 1883 – March 3, 1895	48th 49th 50th 51st 52nd 53rd	Elected in 1882. Re-elected in 1884. Re-elected in 1886. Re-elected in 1888. Re-elected in 1890. Re-elected in 1892. Lost re-election.
Alston G. Dayton (Philippi)	Republican	March 4, 1895 – March 16, 1905	54th 55th 56th 57th 58th 59th	Elected in 1894. Re-elected in 1896. Re-elected in 1898. Re-elected in 1900. Re-elected in 1902. Re-elected in 1904. Resigned when appointed as a judge of US District Court for the Northern District of West Virginia
Vacant		March 16, 1905 – June 6, 1905	59th	
Thomas Beall Davis (Keyser)	Democratic	June 6, 1905 – March 3, 1907	59th	Elected to finish Dayton's term. Retired.
George Cookman Sturgiss (Morgantown)	Republican	March 4, 1907 – March 3, 1911	60th 61st	Elected in 1906. Re-elected in 1908. Lost re-election.
William Gay Brown Jr. (Kingwood)	Democratic	March 4, 1911 – March 9, 1916	62nd 63rd 64th	Elected in 1910. Re-elected in 1912. Re-elected in 1914. Died.
Vacant		March 9, 1916 – May 9, 1916	64th	
George Meade Bowers (Martinsburg)	Republican	May 9, 1916 – March 3, 1923	64th 65th 66th 67th	Elected to finish Brown's term. Re-elected in 1916. Re-elected in 1918. Re-elected in 1920. Lost re-election.
Robert E. Lee Allen (Morgantown)	Democratic	March 4, 1923 – March 3, 1925	68th	Elected in 1922. Lost re-election.
Frank Llewellyn Bowman (Morgantown)	Republican	March 4, 1925 – March 3, 1933	69th 70th 71st 72nd	Elected in 1924. Re-elected in 1926. Re-elected in 1928. Re-elected in 1930. Lost re-election.
Jennings Randolph (Elkins)	Democratic	March 4, 1933 – January 3, 1947	73rd 74th 75th 76th 77th 78th 79th	Elected in 1932. Re-elected in 1934. Re-elected in 1936. Re-elected in 1938. Re-elected in 1940. Re-elected in 1942. Re-elected in 1944. Lost re-election.
Melvin C. Snyder (Kingwood)	Republican	January 3, 1947 – January 3, 1949	80th	Elected in 1946. Lost re-election.
Harley Orrin Staggers (Keyser)	Democratic	January 3, 1949 – January 3, 1981	81st 82nd 83rd 84th 85th 86th 87th 88th 89th 90th 91st 92nd 93rd 94th 95th 96th	Elected in 1948. Re-elected in 1950. Re-elected in 1952. Re-elected in 1954. Re-elected in 1956. Re-elected in 1958. Re-elected in 1960. Re-elected in 1962. Re-elected in 1964. Re-elected in 1966. Re-elected in 1968. Re-elected in 1970. Re-elected in 1972. Re-elected in 1974. Re-elected in 1976. Re-elected in 1978. Retired.
Cleve Benedict (Lewisburg)	Republican	January 3, 1981 – January 3, 1983	97th	Elected in 1980. Retired to run for U.S. senator.
Harley O. Staggers Jr. (Keyser)	Democratic	January 3, 1983 – January 3, 1993	98th 99th 100th 101st 102nd	Elected in 1982. Re-elected in 1984. Re-elected in 1986. Re-elected in 1988. Re-elected in 1990. Redistricted to the 1st district and lost renomination.
Bob Wise (Clendenin)	Democratic	January 3, 1993 – January 3, 2001	103rd 104th 105th 106th	Redistricted from the 3rd district and re-elected in 1992. Re-elected in 1994. Re-elected in 1996. Re-elected in 1998. Retired to run for Governor of West Virginia.
Shelley Moore Capito (Charleston)	Republican	January 3, 2001 – January 3, 2015	107th 108th 109th 110th 111th 112th 113th	Elected in 2000. Re-elected in 2002. Re-elected in 2004. Re-elected in 2006. Re-elected in 2008. Re-elected in 2010. Re-elected in 2012. Retired to run for U.S. senator.
Alex Mooney (Charles Town)	Republican	January 3, 2015 – January 3, 2025	114th 115th 116th 117th 118th	Elected in 2014. Re-elected in 2016. Re-elected in 2018. Re-elected in 2020. Re-elected in 2022. Retired to run for U.S. senator.
Riley Moore (Harpers Ferry)	Republican	January 3, 2025 – present	119th	Elected in 2024. Re-elected in 2026.

== Recent election results ==
=== 2000s ===
2000 United States House of Representatives elections in West Virginia
Party	Candidate	Votes	%
Republican	Shelley Moore Capito	108,769	48.49
Democratic	Jim Humphreys	103,003	45.92
Libertarian	John Brown	12,543	5.59
Total votes		224,315	100.00
Republican gain from Democratic			

2002 United States House of Representatives elections in West Virginia
Party	Candidate	Votes	%
Republican	Shelley Moore Capito (incumbent)	98,276	60.04
Democratic	Jim Humphreys	65,400	39.96
Total votes		163,676	100.00
Republican hold			

2004 United States House of Representatives elections in West Virginia
Party	Candidate	Votes	%
Republican	Shelley Moore Capito (incumbent)	147,676	57.46
Democratic	Erik Wells	106,131	41.29
Mountain	Julian Martin	3,218	1.25
Total votes		257,025	100.00
Republican hold			

2006 United States House of Representatives elections in West Virginia
Party	Candidate	Votes	%
Republican	Shelley Moore Capito (incumbent)	94,110	57.18
Democratic	Mike Callaghan	70,470	42.82
Total votes		164,580	100.00
Republican hold			

2008 United States House of Representatives elections in West Virginia
Party	Candidate	Votes	%
Republican	Shelley Moore Capito (incumbent)	147,334	57.07
Democratic	Anne Barth	110,819	42.92
Write-ins		16	0.01
Total votes		258,169	100.00
Republican hold			

=== 2010s ===
2010 United States House of Representatives elections in West Virginia
Party	Candidate	Votes	%
Republican	Shelley Moore Capito (incumbent)	126,814	68.46
Democratic	Virginia Lynch Graf	55,001	29.69
Constitution	Phil Hudok	3,431	1.85
Total votes		185,246	100.00
Republican hold			

2012 United States House of Representatives elections in West Virginia
Party	Candidate	Votes	%
Republican	Shelley Moore Capito (incumbent)	158,206	69.8
Democratic	Howard Swint	68,560	30.2
Total votes		226,766	100.0
Republican hold			

2014 United States House of Representatives elections in West Virginia
Party	Candidate	Votes	%
Republican	Alex X. Mooney	72,619	47.1
Democratic	Nick Casey	67,687	43.9
Libertarian	Davy Jones	7,682	5.0
Independent	Ed Rabel	6,250	4.0
Total votes		154,238	100.0
Republican hold			

2016 United States House of Representatives elections in West Virginia
Party	Candidate	Votes	%
Republican	Alex Mooney (incumbent)	140,807	58.2
Democratic	Mark Hunt	101,207	41.8
Total votes		242,014	100.0
Republican hold			

2018 United States House of Representatives elections in West Virginia
Party	Candidate	Votes	%
Republican	Alex Mooney (incumbent)	110,504	53.9
Democratic	Talley Sergent	88,011	43.0
Mountain	Daniel Lutz	6,277	3.1
Total votes		204,792	100.0
Republican hold			

=== 2020s ===
2020 United States House of Representatives elections in West Virginia
Party	Candidate	Votes	%
Republican	Alex Mooney (incumbent)	172,195	63.1
Democratic	Cathy Kunkel	100,799	36.9
Total votes		272,994	100.0
Republican hold			

2022 United States House of Representatives elections in West Virginia
Party	Candidate	Votes	%
Republican	Alex Mooney (incumbent)	160,493	65.6
Democratic	Barry Lee Wendell	84,278	34.4
Total votes		244,771	100.0
Republican hold			

2024 United States House of Representatives elections in West Virginia
Party	Candidate	Votes	%
Republican	Riley Moore	268,190	70.8
Democratic	Steven Wendelin	110,775	29.2
Total votes		378,965	100.0
Republican hold			

== Historical district boundaries ==
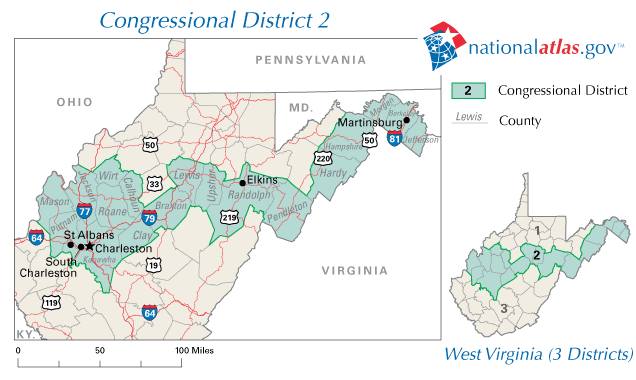
2003 - 2013

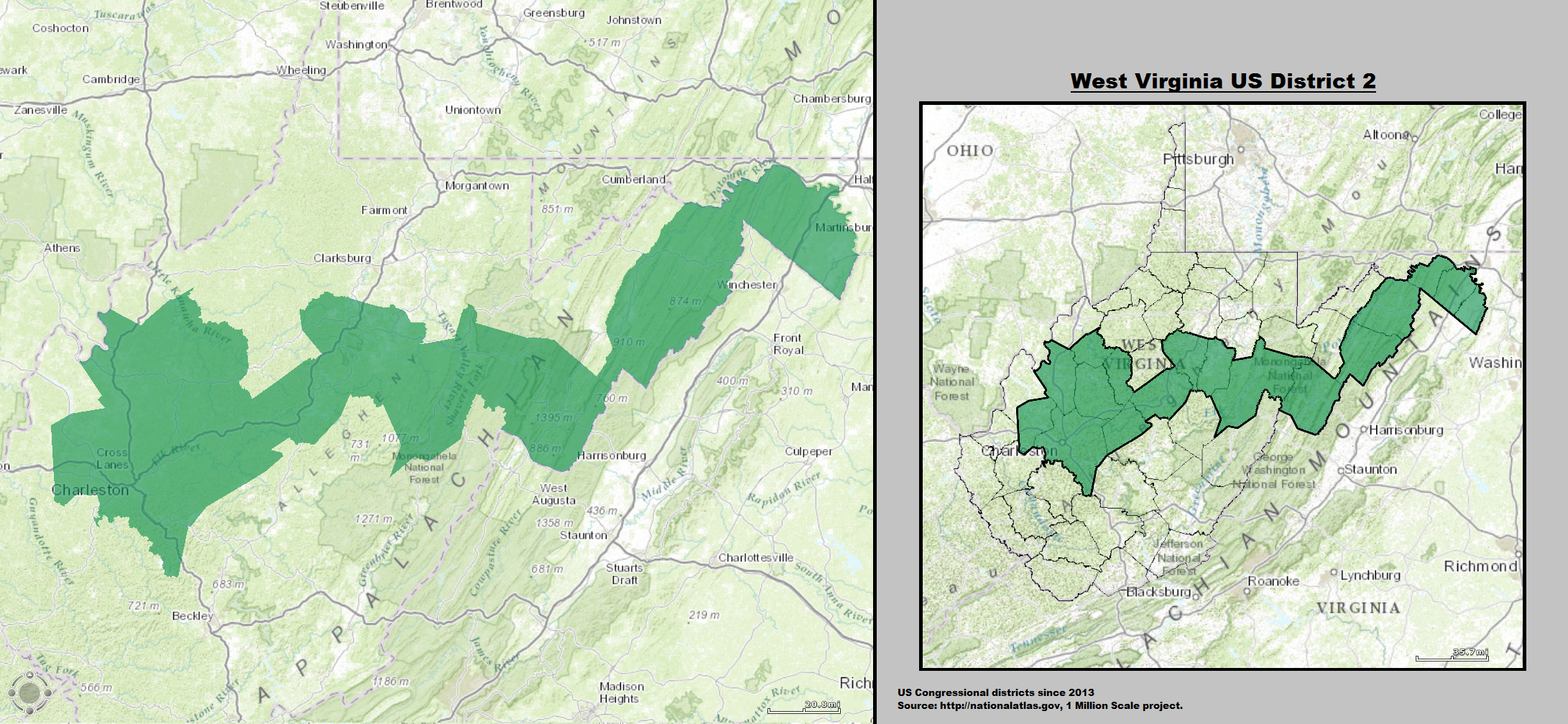
2013 - 2023

== See also ==
- West Virginia's congressional districts
- List of United States congressional districts
