= 1986 United States House of Representatives elections in West Virginia =

- November 4, 1986

All 4 West Virginia seats to the United States House of Representatives
	Majority party	Minority party
Party	Democratic	Republican
Last election	4	0
Seats won	4	0
Seat change	Steady	Steady
Popular vote	298,956	96,864
Percentage	75.53%	24.47%
- Democratic 50–60% 60–70% 70–80% 80–90% 90–100%

The 1986 United States House of Representatives elections in West Virginia were held on November 4, 1986, to determine who would represent the state of West Virginia in the United States House of Representatives, with primary elections taking place on May 13. West Virginia had four seats in the House, apportioned according to the 1980 United States census. Representatives are elected for two-year terms.

== District 1 ==
Incumbent Democratic representative Alan Mollohan was re-elected unopposed.

=== Democratic primary ===
Incumbent representative Alan Mollohan went unopposed in the Democratic primary.

1986 West Virginia's 1st congressional district election Democratic primary
Party	Candidate	Votes	%
Democratic	Alan Mollohan	53,018	100.00
Total votes		72,776	100.00

=== Republican primary ===
No candidates filed for the Republican primary.

=== General election ===
1986 West Virginia's 1st congressional district election
Party	Candidate	Votes	%
Democratic	Alan Mollohan	90,715	100.00
Total votes		90,715	100.00
Democratic hold			

== District 2 ==
Incumbent Democratic representative Harley O. Staggers Jr. was re-elected with 69.47% of the vote.

=== Democratic primary ===
Incumbent representative Harley O. Staggers Jr. was re-nominated with 90.16% of the vote.

1986 West Virginia's 2nd congressional district election Democratic primary
Party	Candidate	Votes	%
Democratic	Harley O. Staggers Jr.	50,533	90.16
Democratic	D. P. Given	5,513	9.84
Total votes		56,046	100.00

=== Republican primary ===
Michele Golden won the Republican nomination with 88.77% of the vote.

1986 West Virginia's 2nd congressional district election Republican primary
Party	Candidate	Votes	%
Republican	Michele Golden	19,546	88.77
Republican	Charles Wood	2,472	11.23
Total votes		22,018	100.00

=== General election ===
1986 West Virginia's 2nd congressional district election
Party	Candidate	Votes	%
Democratic	Harley O. Staggers Jr.	76,355	69.47
Republican	Michele Golden	33,554	30.53
Total votes		109,909	100.00
Democratic hold			

== District 3 ==
Incumbent Democratic representative Bob Wise was re-elected with 64.91% of the vote.

=== Democratic primary ===
Incumbent representative Bob Wise went unopposed in the Democratic primary.

1986 West Virginia's 3rd congressional district election Democratic primary
Party	Candidate	Votes	%
Democratic	Bob Wise	52,225	100.00
Total votes		52,225	100.00

=== Republican primary ===
No candidates filed for the Republican primary. Tim Sharp was placed on the general election ballot.

=== General election ===
1986 West Virginia's 3rd congressional district election
Party	Candidate	Votes	%
Democratic	Bob Wise	73,669	64.91
Republican	Tim Sharp	39,820	35.09
Total votes		113,489	100.00
Democratic hold			

== District 4 ==
Incumbent Democratic representative Nick Rahall was re-elected with 71.25% of the vote.

=== Democratic primary ===
Incumbent representative Nick Rahall went unopposed in the Democratic primary.

1986 West Virginia's 4th congressional district election Democratic primary
Party	Candidate	Votes	%
Democratic	Nick Rahall	56,603	100.00
Total votes		56,603	100.00

=== Republican primary ===
Martin Miller went unopposed in the Republican primary.

1986 West Virginia's 2nd congressional district election Republican primary
Party	Candidate	Votes	%
Republican	Martin Miller	8,560	100.00
Total votes		8,560	100.00

=== General election ===
1986 West Virginia's 4th congressional district election
Party	Candidate	Votes	%
Democratic	Nick Rahall	58,217	71.25
Republican	Martin Miller	23,490	28.75
Total votes		81,707	100.00
Democratic hold			
