= 2020 West Virginia Attorney General election =

- November 3, 2020
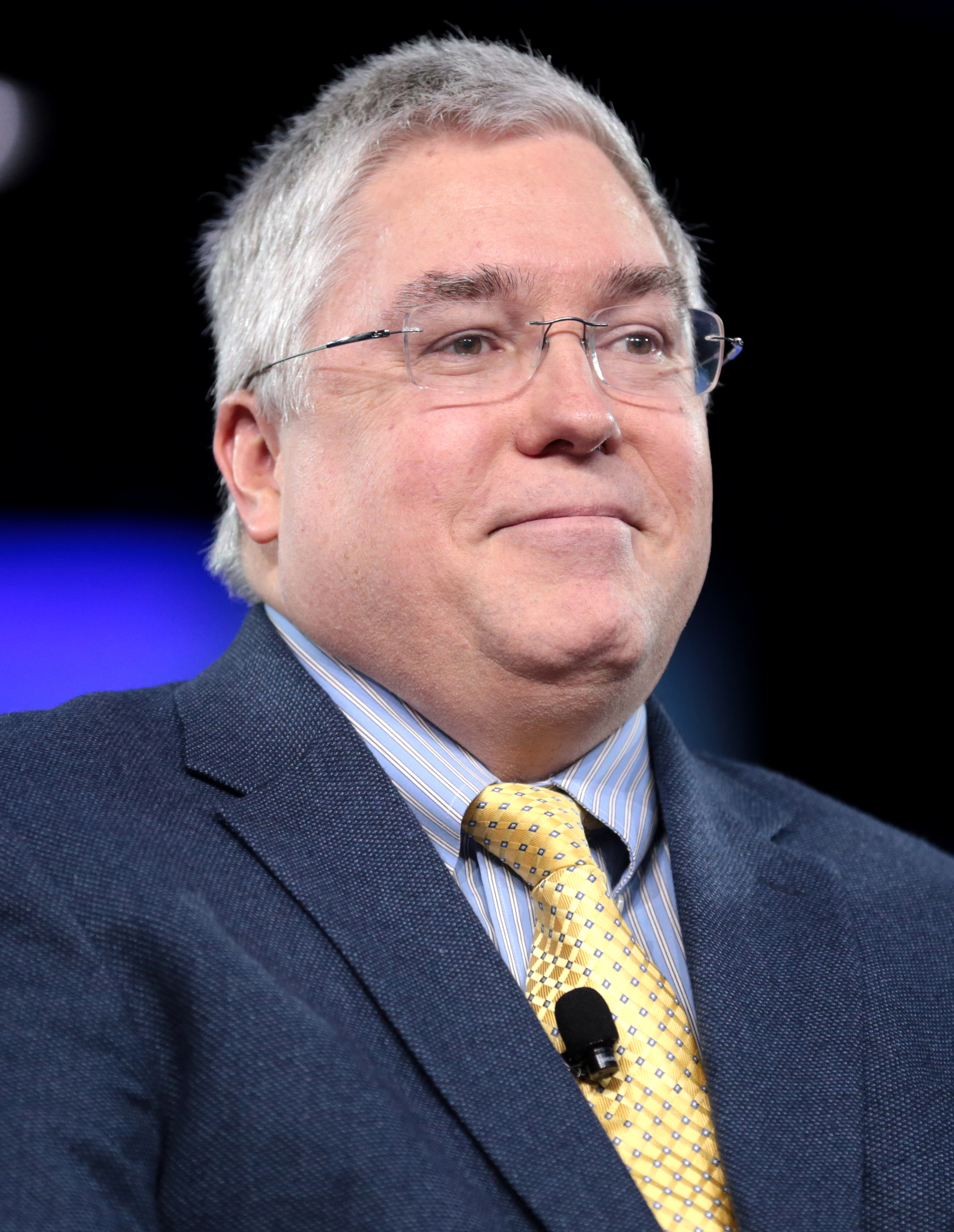

Nominee	Patrick Morrisey	Sam Petsonk
Party	Republican	Democratic
Popular vote	487,250	276,798
Percentage	63.77%	36.23%
- Morrisey: 50–60% 60–70% 70–80% 80–90% >90% Petsonk: 50–60% 60–70% 70–80% 80–90% >90% Tie: 50%
Attorney General before election
Patrick Morrisey
Republican
Elected Attorney General
Patrick Morrisey
Republican

The 2020 West Virginia Attorney General election was held on November 3, 2020, to elect the West Virginia Attorney General, concurrently with the 2020 U.S. presidential election, as well as elections to the United States Senate, U.S. House of Representatives, governor, and other state and local elections. Due to the COVID-19 pandemic, primary elections were held on June 9, 2020, instead of the originally scheduled date of May 12.

Incumbent Republican attorney general Patrick Morrisey won re-election to a third term in office against Democratic layer Sam Petsonk.

== Republican primary ==
=== Candidates ===
==== Nominee ====
- Patrick Morrisey, incumbent attorney general (2013–present) and nominee for U.S. Senate in 2018

=== Results ===
Republican primary results
Party	Candidate	Votes	%
Republican	Patrick Morrisey (incumbent)	175,292	100.0
Total votes		175,292	100.0

== Democratic primary ==
=== Candidates ===
==== Nominee ====
- Sam Petsonk, lawyer

==== Eliminated in primary ====
- Isaac Sponaugle, state delegate from the 55th district (2013–present)

=== Endorsements ===
Isaac Sponaugle

Labor unions

- West Virginia AFL-CIO

=== Results ===
Democratic primary results by county Petsonk: 50–60%; 60–70%; 70–80%; 80–90%; Sponaugle: 50–60%; 60–70%; 70–80%; 80–90%

Democratic primary results
Party	Candidate	Votes	%
Democratic	Sam Petsonk	86,490	50.07
Democratic	Isaac Sponaugle	86,263	49.93
Total votes		172,753	100.0

== General election ==
=== Predictions ===
Source	Ranking	As of
The Cook Political Report	Likely R	October 28, 2020

=== Post-primary endorsements ===
Patrick Morrisey (R)

Executive branch officials

- Donald Trump, 45th president of the United States (2017–present) and Republican nominee for president in 2020
Sam Petsonk (D)

U.S. senators

- Joe Manchin, incumbent U.S. senator from West Virginia (2010–present), former Governor of West Virginia (2005–2010), and former West Virginia Secretary of State (2001–2005)

Labor unions

- United Mine Workers of America

Newspapers and other media

- Charleston Gazette-Mail
- The Herald-Dispatch

=== Polling ===
Poll source	Date(s) administered	Sample size (Note: Key: A – all adults RV – registered voters LV – likely voters V – unclear)	Margin of error	Patrick Morrisey (R)	Sam Petsonk (D)	Undecided
Triton Polling Research/WMOV	October 19–20, 2020	544 (LV)	± 4.2%	53%	41%	6%
Triton Polling Research/WMOV	September 29–30, 2020	525 (V)	± 4.3%	53%	41%	6%

=== Results ===
2020 West Virginia Attorney General election
Party	Candidate	Votes	%
Republican	Patrick Morrisey (incumbent)	487,250	63.77
Democratic	Sam Petsonk	276,798	36.23
Total votes		764,048	100.0
Republican hold			

==== By county ====
2020 West Virginia Attorney General election (by county)
County	Patrick Morrisey Republican		Sam Petsonk Democratic		Margin		Total votes cast
County	#	%	#	%	#	%	Total votes cast
Barbour	4,491	69.38%	1,982	30.62%	2,509	38.76%	6,473
Berkeley	34,559	68.67%	15,767	31.33%	18,792	37.34%	50,326
Boone	5,423	62.59%	3,241	37.41%	2,182	25.18%	8,664
Braxton	3,410	63.44%	1,965	36.56%	1,445	26.88%	5,375
Brooke	6,475	63.87%	3,663	36.13%	2,812	27.74%	10,138
Cabell	19,654	54.56%	16,369	45.44%	3,285	9.02%	36,023
Calhoun	1,964	70.93%	805	29.07%	1,159	41.86%	2,769
Clay	2,233	68.83%	1,011	31.17%	1,222	37.66%	3,244
Doddridge	2,281	76.96%	683	23.04%	1,598	53.92%	2,964
Fayette	9,277	57.21%	6,938	42.79%	2,339	14.42%	16,215
Gilmer	1,630	64.50%	897	35.50%	733	29.00%	2,527
Grant	4,414	87.15%	651	12.85%	3,763	74.30%	5,065
Greenbrier	9,862	63.90%	5,572	36.10%	4,290	27.80%	15,434
Hampshire	7,778	80.85%	1,842	19.15%	5,936	61.70%	9,620
Hancock	8,767	66.33%	4,450	33.67%	4,317	32.66%	13,217
Hardy	4,682	76.47%	1,441	23.53%	3,241	52.94%	6,123
Harrison	17,993	61.31%	11,355	38.69%	6,638	22.62%	29,348
Jackson	9,016	69.08%	4,036	30.92%	4,980	38.16%	13,052
Jefferson	15,978	59.00%	11,105	41.00%	4,873	18.00%	27,083
Kanawha	41,247	51.90%	38,228	48.10%	3,019	3.80%	79,475
Lewis	5,113	69.96%	2,195	30.04%	2,918	39.92%	7,308
Lincoln	4,932	66.38%	2,498	33.62%	2,434	32.76%	7,430
Logan	8,379	70.97%	3,427	29.03%	4,952	41.94%	11,806
Marion	13,784	55.29%	11,148	44.71%	2,636	10.58%	24,932
Marshall	8,658	64.11%	4,846	35.89%	3,812	28.22%	13,504
Mason	7,146	66.18%	3,652	33.82%	3,494	32.36%	10,798
McDowell	4,224	71.39%	1,693	28.61%	2,531	42.78%	5,917
Mercer	17,317	71.16%	7,018	28.84%	10,299	42.32%	24,335
Mineral	9,955	79.90%	2,504	20.10%	7,451	59.80%	12,459
Mingo	6,875	74.93%	2,300	25.07%	4,575	49.86%	9,175
Monongalia	19,742	48.45%	21,008	51.55%	-1,266	-3.10%	40,750
Monroe	4,526	72.40%	1,725	27.60%	2,801	44.80%	6,251
Morgan	6,471	77.46%	1,883	22.54%	4,588	54.92%	8,354
Nicholas	6,902	67.67%	3,298	32.33%	3,604	35.34%	10,200
Ohio	11,040	57.33%	8,217	42.67%	2,823	14.66%	19,257
Pendleton	2,564	74.10%	896	25.90%	1,668	48.20%	3,460
Pleasants	2,361	71.11%	959	28.89%	1,402	42.22%	3,320
Pocahontas	2,510	66.65%	1,256	33.35%	1,254	33.30%	3,766
Preston	10,253	73.40%	3,715	26.60%	6,538	46.80%	13,968
Putnam	17,642	64.00%	9,942	36.00%	7,700	28.00%	27,614
Raleigh	21,434	67.32%	10,404	32.68%	11,030	34.64%	31,838
Randolph	7,450	63.49%	4,284	36.51%	3,166	26.98%	11,734
Ritchie	3,140	77.68%	902	22.32%	2,238	55.36%	4,042
Roane	3,742	67.44%	1,807	32.56%	1,935	34.88%	5,549
Summers	3,398	64.03%	1,909	35.97%	1,489	28.06%	5,307
Taylor	4,776	66.45%	2,411	33.55%	2,365	32.90%	7,187
Tucker	2,365	64.07%	1,326	35.93%	1,039	28.14%	3,691
Tyler	2,745	73.18%	1,006	26.82%	1,739	46.36%	3,751
Upshur	6,975	70.85%	2,870	29.15%	4,105	41.70%	9,845
Wayne	10,630	66.83%	5,276	33.17%	5,354	33.66%	15,906
Webster	2,126	67.47%	1,025	32.53%	1,101	34.94%	3,151
Wetzel	4,000	63.25%	2,324	36.75%	1,676	26.50%	6,324
Wirt	1,903	75.13%	630	24.87%	1,273	50.26%	2,533
Wood	25,074	67.10%	12,292	32.90%	12,782	34.20%	37,366
Wyoming	5,934	73.40%	2,151	26.60%	3,783	46.80%	8,085
Totals	487,250	63.77%	276,798	36.23%	210,452	27.54%	764,048

==== Counties that flipped from Democratic to Republican ====
Morrisey won 10 counties that had previously voted for Democratic candidate Doug Reynolds in 2016.

- Boone (largest city: Madison)
- Braxton (largest city: Sutton)
- Cabell (largest city: Huntington)
- Fayette (largest city: Oak Hill)
- Harrison (largest city: Clarksburg)
- Kanawha (largest city: Charleston)
- Lincoln (largest city: Hamlin)
- Marion (largest city: Fairmont)
- Wayne (largest city: Kenova)
- Wetzel (largest city: New Martinsville)

==== By congressional district ====
Morrisey won all three congressional districts.

District	Morrisey	Petsonk	Representative
1st	63%	37%	David McKinley
2nd	63%	37%	Alex Mooney
3rd	65%	35%	Carol Miller
