= 1988 United States House of Representatives elections in West Virginia =

- November 6, 1988

All 4 West Virginia seats to the United States House of Representatives
	Majority party	Minority party
Party	Democratic	Republican
Last election	4	0
Seats won	4	0
Seat change	Steady	Steady
Popular vote	426,616	131,963
Percentage	76.38%	23.62%

Democratic
50–60%
60–70%
70–80%
80–90%
90–100%
Republican
50–60%

The 1988 United States House of Representatives elections in West Virginia were held on November 8, 1988, to determine who will represent the state of West Virginia in the United States House of Representatives, with primary elections taking place on May 10. West Virginia had four seats in the House, apportioned according to the 1980 United States census. Representatives are elected for two-year terms.

== District 1 ==
Incumbent Democratic representative Alan Mollohan was re-elected with 74.54% of the vote.

=== Democratic primary ===
Incumbent representative Alan Mollohan went unopposed in the Democratic primary.

1988 West Virginia's 1st congressional district election Democratic primary
Party	Candidate	Votes	%
Democratic	Alan Mollohan	72,776	100.00
Total votes		72,776	100.00

=== Republican primary ===
No candidates filed for the Republican primary. Howard K. Tuck was placed on the general election ballot as the Republican nominee.

=== General election ===
1988 West Virginia's 1st congressional district election
Party	Candidate	Votes	%
Democratic	Alan Mollohan	119,256	74.54
Republican	Howard K. Tuck	40,732	25.46
Total votes		159,988	100.00
Democratic hold			

== District 2 ==
Incumbent Democratic representative Harley O. Staggers Jr. was re-elected with 100% of the vote, as he was unopposed in the general election.

=== Democratic primary ===
Incumbent representative Harley O. Staggers Jr. went unopposed in the Democratic primary.

1988 West Virginia's 2nd congressional district election Democratic primary
Party	Candidate	Votes	%
Democratic	Harley O. Staggers Jr.	66,180	100.00
Total votes		72,776	100.00

=== Republican primary ===
No candidates filed for the Republican primary. There was no Republican candidate on the ballot for the general election.

=== General election ===
1988 West Virginia's 2nd congressional district election
Party	Candidate	Votes	%
Democratic	Harley O. Staggers Jr.	118,356	100.00
Total votes		118,356	100.00
Democratic hold			

== District 3 ==
Incumbent Democratic representative Bob Wise was re-elected with 74.34% of the vote.

=== Democratic primary ===
Incumbent representative Bob Wise went unopposed in the Democratic primary.

1988 West Virginia's 3rd congressional district election Democratic primary
Party	Candidate	Votes	%
Democratic	Bob Wise	67,277	100.00
Total votes		67,277	100.00

=== Republican primary ===
Paul W. Hart went unopposed in the Republican primary.

1988 West Virginia's 3rd congressional district election Republican primary
Party	Candidate	Votes	%
Republican	Paul W. Hart	28,568	100.00
Total votes		28,568	100.00

=== General election ===
1988 West Virginia's 3rd congressional district election
Party	Candidate	Votes	%
Democratic	Bob Wise	120,192	74.34
Republican	Paul W. Hart	41,478	25.66
Total votes		161,670	100.00
Democratic hold			

== District 4 ==
Incumbent Democratic representative Nick Rahall was re-elected with 61.30% of the vote.

=== Democratic primary ===
Incumbent representative Nick Rahall handily won the Democratic primary with 72.68% of the vote.

1988 West Virginia's 4th congressional district election Democratic primary
Party	Candidate	Votes	%
Democratic	Nick Rahall	56,996	72.68
Democratic	William Sanders	12,920	16.48
Democratic	Ted T. Stacy	8,503	10.84
Total votes		78,419	100.00

=== Republican primary ===
Paul W. Hart went unopposed in the Republican primary.

1988 West Virginia's 4th congressional district election Republican primary
Party	Candidate	Votes	%
Republican	Marianne Brewster	14,869	100.00
Total votes		14,869	100.00

=== General election ===
1988 West Virginia's 4th congressional district election
Party	Candidate	Votes	%
Democratic	Nick Rahall	78,812	61.30
Republican	Marianne Brewster	49,753	38.70
Total votes		128,565	100.00
Democratic hold			
