= 1990 United States House of Representatives elections in West Virginia =

- November 6, 1990

All 4 West Virginia seats to the United States House of Representatives
	Majority party	Minority party
Party	Democratic	Republican
Last election	4	0
Seats won	4	0
Seat change	Steady	Steady
Popular vote	251,298	123,311
Percentage	67.08%	32.92%
Swing	▼9.71%	▲9.71%

Democratic
50–60%
60–70%
70–80%
90–100%
Republican
50–60%

The 1990 United States House of Representatives elections in West Virginia were held on November 6, 1990 to determine who will represent the state of West Virginia in the United States House of Representatives. West Virginia has three seats in the House, apportioned according to the 1980 United States census. Representatives are elected for two-year terms.

== Overview ==
United States House of Representatives elections in West Virginia, 1992
Party	Votes	Percentage	Seats	+/–
Democratic	251,298	67.08%	4	-
Republican	123,311	32.92%	0	-
Totals	374,609	100.00%	4	

== District 1 ==
1990 West Virginia's 1st congressional district election
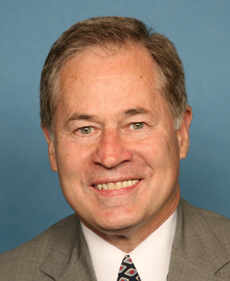

Nominee	Alan Mollohan	Howard K. Tuck
Party	Democratic	Republican
Popular vote	72,849	35,657
Percentage	67.1%	32.9%
- County results Mollohan: 50–60% 60–70% 70–80%
U.S. Representative before election
Alan Mollohan
Democratic
Elected U.S. Representative
Alan Mollohan
Democratic

Incumbent Democrat Alan Mollohan was re-elected with 67.1% of the vote. This district covers the northern part of the state.

West Virginia's 1st congressional district election, 1990
Party	Candidate	Votes	%
Democratic	Alan Mollohan (incumbent)	72,849	67.14
Republican	Howard K. Tuck	35,657	32.86
Total votes		108,506	100.00
Democratic hold			

== District 2 ==
1990 West Virginia's 2nd congressional district election
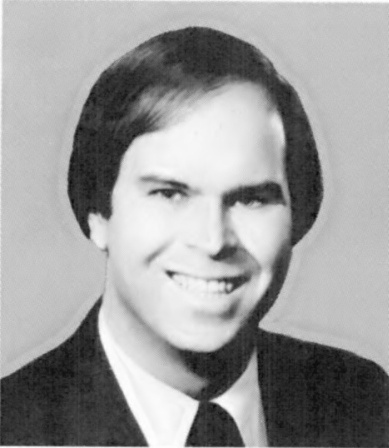

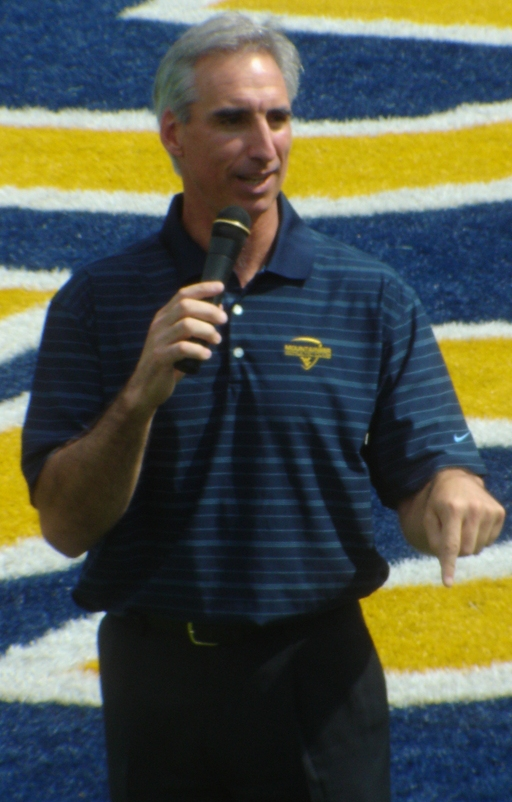
Nominee	Harley O. Staggers, Jr.	Oliver Luck
Party	Democratic	Republican
Popular vote	63,174	50,708
Percentage	55.5%	44.5%
- County results Staggers: 50–60% 60–70% 70–80% Luck: 50–60%
U.S. Representative before election
Harley O. Staggers, Jr.
Democratic
Elected U.S. Representative
Harley O. Staggers, Jr.
Democratic

Incumbent Democrat Harley O. Staggers, Jr. defeated Republican Oliver Luck. This district covers the Eastern part of the state.

West Virginia's 2nd congressional district election, 1990
Party	Candidate	Votes	%
Democratic	Harley O. Staggers, Jr. (incumbent)	63,174	55.47
Republican	Oliver Luck	50,708	44.53
Total votes		113,882	100.00
Democratic hold			

== District 3 ==
1990 West Virginia's 3rd congressional district election
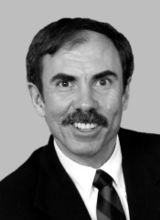
Nominee	Bob Wise
Party	Democratic
Popular vote	75,327
Percentage	100.0%
- County results Wise: >90%
U.S. Representative before election
Bob Wise
Democratic
Elected U.S. Representative
Bob Wise
Democratic

Incumbent Democrat Bob Wise Was re-elected to a fourth term facing no opponent. This district covers much of the central and western portions of the state as well as the capital of Charleston.

West Virginia's 3rd congressional district election, 1990
Party	Candidate	Votes	%
Democratic	Bob Wise (incumbent)	75,327	100.00
Total votes		75,327	100.00
Democratic hold			

== District 4 ==
1990 West Virginia's 4th congressional district election
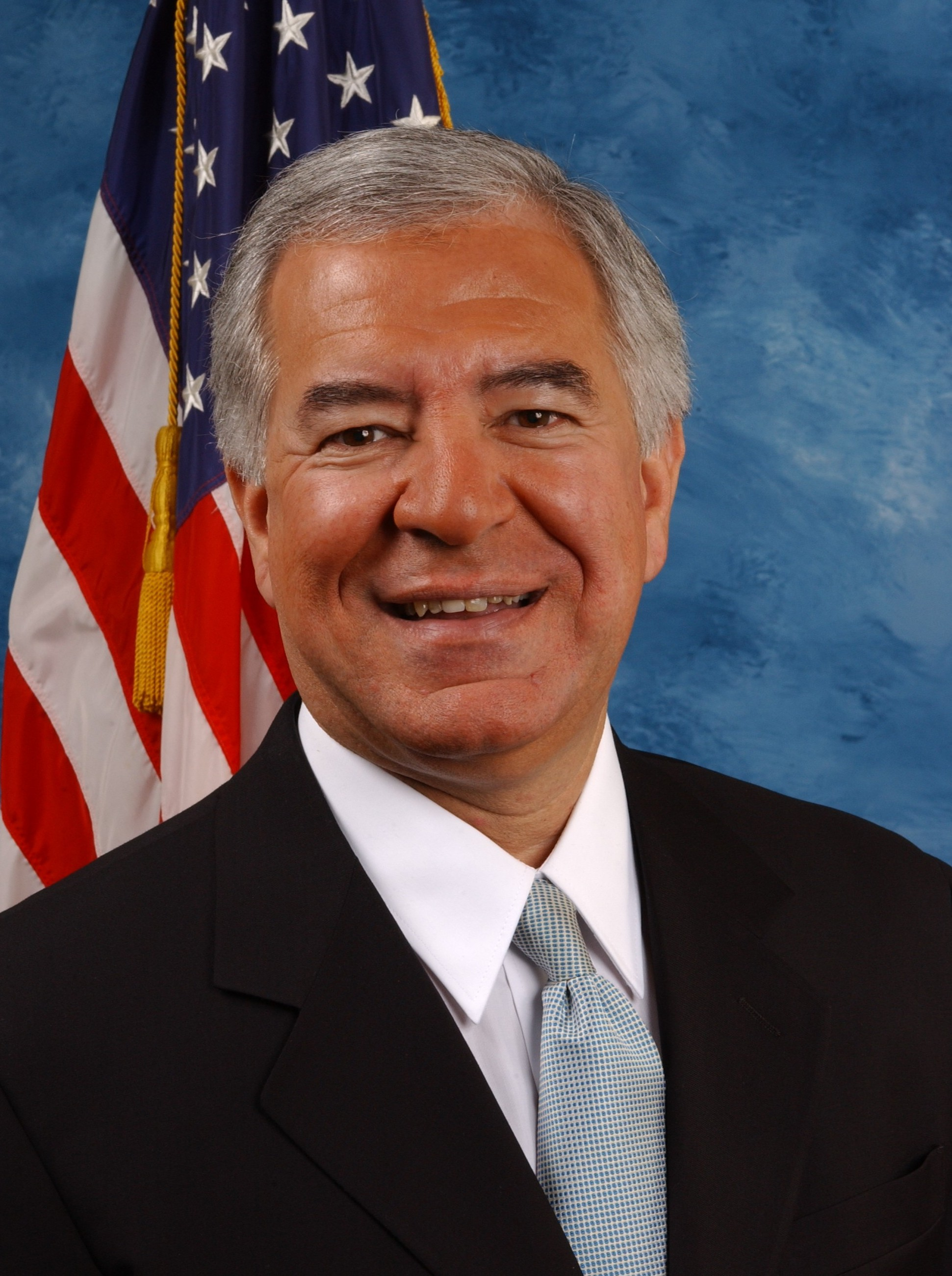

Nominee	Nick Rahall	Marianne R. Brewster
Party	Democratic	Republican
Popular vote	39,948	36,946
Percentage	52.0%	48.0%
- County results Rahall: 50–60% 60–70% 70–80% Brewster: 50–60%
U.S. Representative before election
Nick Rahall
Democratic
Elected U.S. Representative
Nick Rahall
Democratic

Incumbent Democrat Nick Rahall defeated Republican Marianne R. Brewster. This district covers the Southern part of the state.

West Virginia's 4th congressional district election, 1990
Party	Candidate	Votes	%
Democratic	Nick Rahall (incumbent)	39,948	51.95
Republican	Marianne R. Brewster	36,946	48.05
Total votes		76,894	100.00
Democratic hold			
