= 2008 United States House of Representatives elections in West Virginia =

- November 4, 2008

All 3 West Virginia seats to the United States House of Representatives
	Majority party	Minority party
Party	Democratic	Republican
Last election	2	1
Seats won	2	1
Seat change	Steady	Steady
Popular vote	432,075	213,339
Percentage	66.93%	33.05%
Swing	▲8.92%	▼8.92%

Democratic
50–60%
60–70%
70–80%
>90%
Republican
50–60%
60–70%
70–80%

The 2008 congressional elections in West Virginia was held on November 4, 2008, to determine who would represent the state of West Virginia in the United States House of Representatives. Representatives are elected for two-year terms; whoever is elected will serve in the 111th Congress from January 4, 2009, until January 3, 2011. The election coincided with the 2008 U.S. presidential election.

West Virginia has three seats in the House, apportioned according to the 2000 United States census. Its 2007–2008 congressional delegation consisted of two Democrats and one Republican. As of 2026, this is the last time that Democrats won both a majority of congressional districts and the House popular vote in West Virginia.

== Overview ==
United States House of Representatives elections in West Virginia, 2008
Party	Votes	Percentage	Seats	+/–
Democratic	432,075	66.93%	2	—
Republican	213,339	33.05%	1	—
Independents	146	0.02%	0	—
Totals	645,560	100.00%	3	—

== District 1 ==
2008 West Virginia's 1st congressional district election
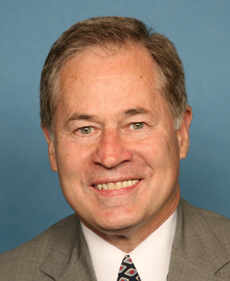
Nominee	Alan Mollohan
Party	Democratic
Popular vote	187,734
Percentage	99.93%
- County results Mollohan: 90–100%
U.S. Representative before election
Alan Mollohan
Democratic
Elected U.S. Representative
Alan Mollohan
Democratic

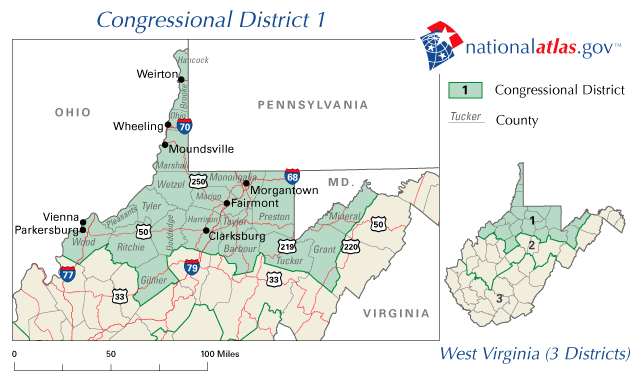

Democratic incumbent Alan Mollohan ran unopposed.

=== Predictions ===
Source	Ranking	As of
The Cook Political Report	Safe D	November 6, 2008
Rothenberg	Safe D	November 2, 2008
Sabato's Crystal Ball	Safe D	November 6, 2008
Real Clear Politics	Safe D	November 7, 2008
CQ Politics	Safe D	November 6, 2008

West Virginia's 1st congressional district election, 2008
Party	Candidate	Votes	%
Democratic	Alan Mollohan (incumbent)	187,734	99.93
Write-ins		130	0.07
Total votes		187,864	100.00
Democratic hold			

== District 2 ==
2008 West Virginia's 2nd congressional district election
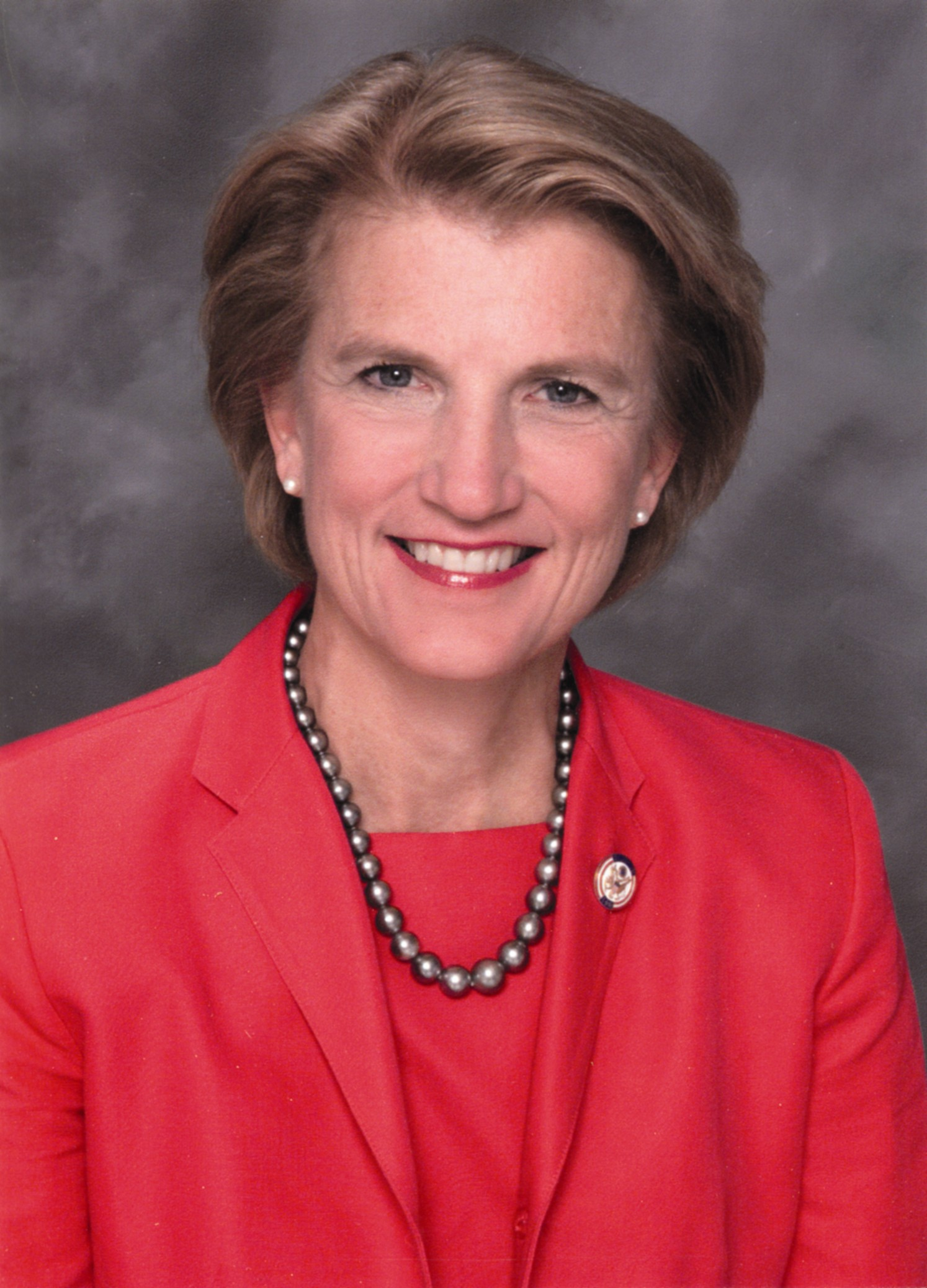

Nominee	Shelley Moore Capito	Anne Barth
Party	Republican	Democratic
Popular vote	147,334	110,819
Percentage	57.07%	42.92%
- County results Capito: 50–60% 60–70% 70–80% Barth: 50–60%
U.S. Representative before election
Shelley Moore Capito
Republican
Elected U.S. Representative
Shelley Moore Capito
Republican

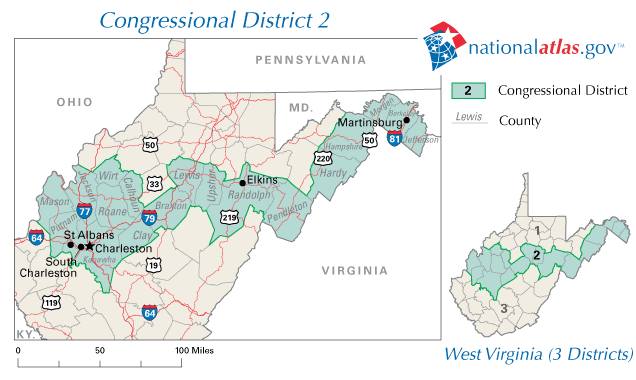

Republican incumbent Shelley Moore Capito (campaign website) won against Democratic nominee Anne Barth (campaign website), a longtime former aide to U.S. Senator Robert Byrd. CQ Politics ranked the race 'Leans Republican'. The Rothenberg Political Report considered it 'Republican Favored'. The Cook Political Report considered it 'Likely Republican'.

In 2006, Capito was reelected with 57%, a solid margin, but not a sign of political security. She faced a potentially difficult challenge from state Sen. John Unger (D), but Unger surprised many when he dropped out of the race.

=== Predictions ===
Source	Ranking	As of
The Cook Political Report	Lean R	November 6, 2008
Rothenberg	Likely R	November 2, 2008
Sabato's Crystal Ball	Lean R	November 6, 2008
Real Clear Politics	Safe R	November 7, 2008
CQ Politics	Lean R	November 6, 2008

West Virginia's 2nd congressional district election, 2008
Party	Candidate	Votes	%
Republican	Shelley Moore Capito (incumbent)	147,334	57.07
Democratic	Anne Barth	110,819	42.92
Write-ins		16	0.01
Total votes		258,169	100.00
Republican hold			

== District 3 ==
2008 West Virginia's 3rd congressional district election

Nominee	Nick Rahall	Marty Gearheart
Party	Democratic	Republican
Popular vote	133,522	66,005
Percentage	66.92%	33.08%
- County results Rahall: 50–60% 60–70% 70–80%
U.S. Representative before election
Nick Rahall
Democratic
Elected U.S. Representative
Nick Rahall
Democratic

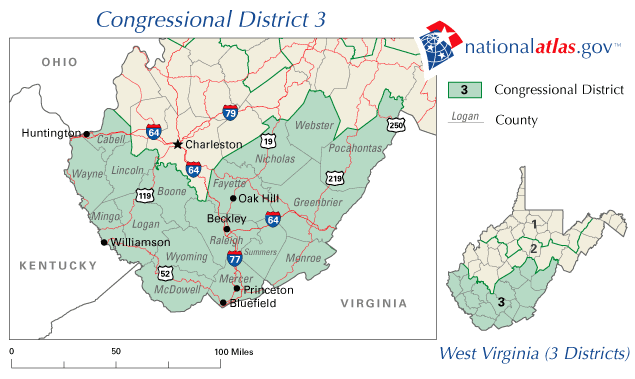

Democratic incumbent Nick Rahall was challenged by Republican Marty Gearheart.

=== Predictions ===
Source	Ranking	As of
The Cook Political Report	Safe D	November 6, 2008
Rothenberg	Safe D	November 2, 2008
Sabato's Crystal Ball	Safe D	November 6, 2008
Real Clear Politics	Safe D	November 7, 2008
CQ Politics	Safe D	November 6, 2008

West Virginia's 3rd congressional district election, 2008
Party	Candidate	Votes	%
Democratic	Nick Rahall (incumbent)	133,522	66.92
Republican	Marty Gearheart	66,005	33.08
Total votes		199,527	100.00
Democratic hold			

Preceded by 2006 elections	United States House elections in West Virginia; 2008	Succeeded by 2010 elections
