= 2006 United States House of Representatives elections in West Virginia =

- November 7, 2006

All 3 West Virginia seats to the United States House of Representatives
	Majority party	Minority party
Party	Democratic	Republican
Last election	2	1
Seats won	2	1
Seat change	Steady	Steady
Popular vote	263,822	190,893
Percentage	58.01%	41.97%
Swing	▲0.45%	▼0.02%

Democratic
50–60%
60–70%
70–80%
80–90%
Republican
50–60%
60–70%
70–80%

The 2006 United States House of Representatives elections in West Virginia were held on November 7, 2006, to determine who will represent the state of West Virginia in the United States House of Representatives. West Virginia has three seats in the House, apportioned according to the 2000 United States census. Representatives are elected for two-year terms.

== Overview ==
United States House of Representatives elections in West Virginia, 2006
Party	Votes	Percentage	Seats	+/–
Democratic	263,822	58.01%	2	—
Republican	190,893	41.97%	1	—
Independents	98	0.02%	0	—
Totals	454,813	100.00%	3	—

== District 1 ==
2006 West Virginia's 1st congressional district election
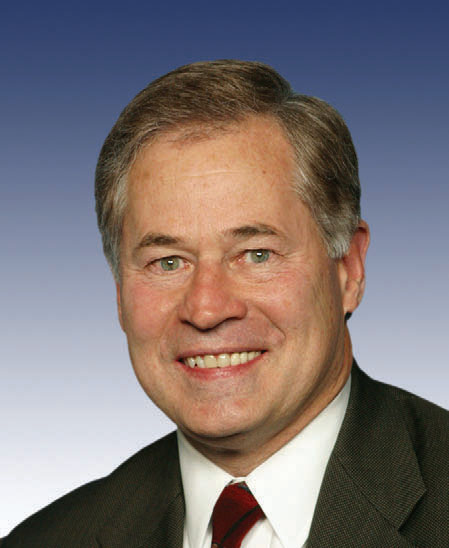

Nominee	Alan Mollohan	Chris Wakim
Party	Democratic	Republican
Popular vote	100,939	55,963
Percentage	64.3%	35.7%
- County results Mollohan: 50–60% 60–70% 70–80% Wakim: 50–60%
U.S. Representative before election
Alan Mollohan
Democratic
Elected U.S. Representative
Alan Mollohan
Democratic

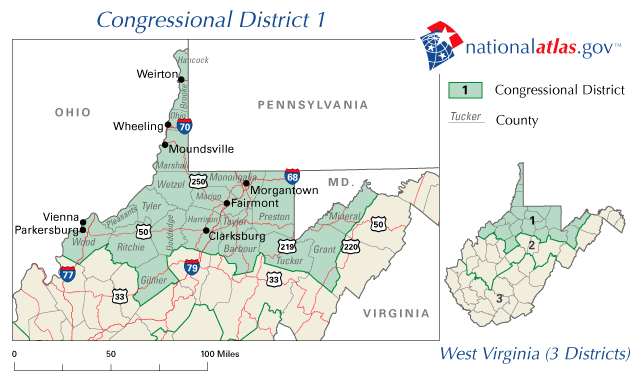

Incumbent Democrat Alan Mollohan defeated Republican Chris Wakim, a state delegate. This district covers the northern part of the state.

=== Predictions ===
Source	Ranking	As of
The Cook Political Report	Likely D	November 6, 2006
Rothenberg	Safe D	November 6, 2006
Sabato's Crystal Ball	Likely D	November 6, 2006
Real Clear Politics	Safe D	November 7, 2006
CQ Politics	Likely D	November 7, 2006

West Virginia's 1st congressional district election, 2006
Party	Candidate	Votes	%
Democratic	Alan Mollohan (incumbent)	100,939	64.29
Republican	Chris Wakim	55,963	35.65
Write-ins		98	0.06
Total votes		157,000	100.00
Democratic hold			

== District 2 ==
2006 West Virginia's 2nd congressional district election
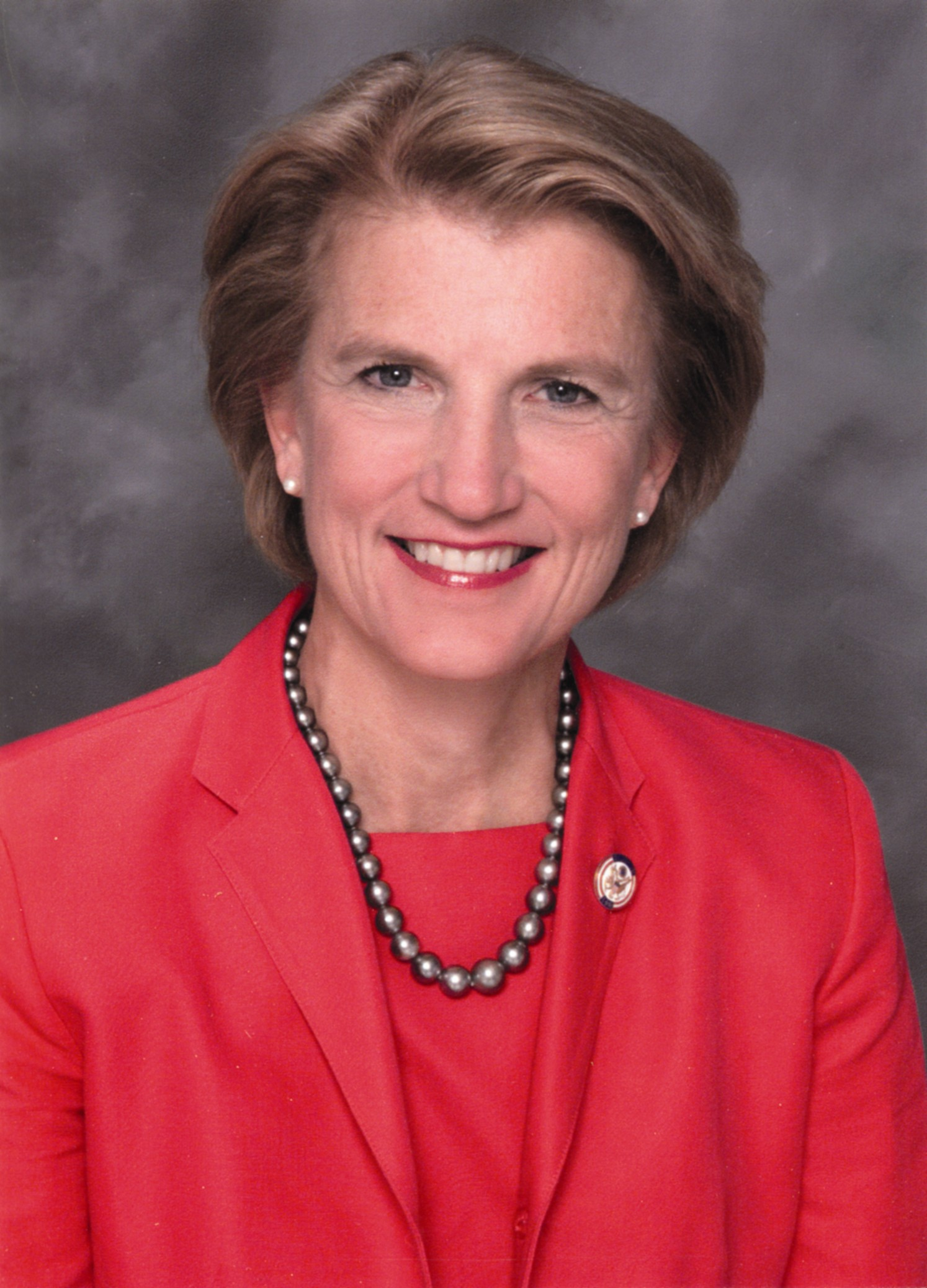

Nominee	Shelley Moore Capito	Mike Callaghan
Party	Republican	Democratic
Popular vote	94,110	70,470
Percentage	57.18%	42.82%
- County results Capito: 50–60% 60–70% 70–80% Callaghan: 50–60%
U.S. Representative before election
Shelley Moore Capito
Republican
Elected U.S. Representative
Shelley Moore Capito
Republican

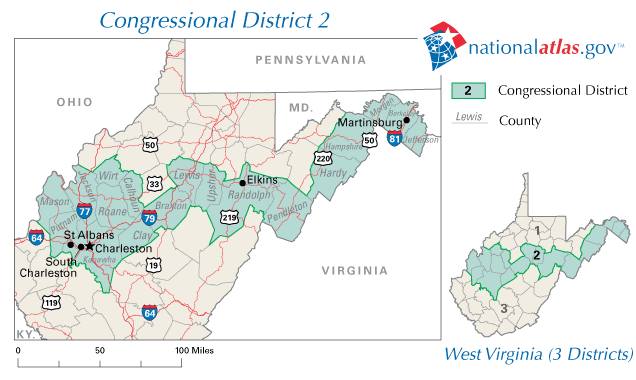

Incumbent Republican Shelley Moore Capito defeated Democrat Mike Callaghan, a U.S. Attorney. This district covers the central part of the state.

=== Predictions ===
Source	Ranking	As of
The Cook Political Report	Likely R	November 6, 2006
Rothenberg	Safe R	November 6, 2006
Sabato's Crystal Ball	Likely R	November 6, 2006
Real Clear Politics	Safe R	November 7, 2006
CQ Politics	Likely R	November 7, 2006

West Virginia's 2nd congressional district election, 2006
Party	Candidate	Votes	%
Republican	Shelley Moore Capito (incumbent)	94,110	57.18
Democratic	Mike Callaghan	70,470	42.82
Total votes		164,580	100.00
Republican hold			

== District 3 ==
2006 West Virginia's 3rd congressional district election

Nominee	Nick Rahall	Kim Wolfe
Party	Democratic	Republican
Popular vote	92,413	40,820
Percentage	69.36%	30.64%
- County results Rahall: 50–60% 60–70% 70–80% 80–90%
U.S. Representative before election
Nick Rahall
Democratic
Elected U.S. Representative
Nick Rahall
Democratic

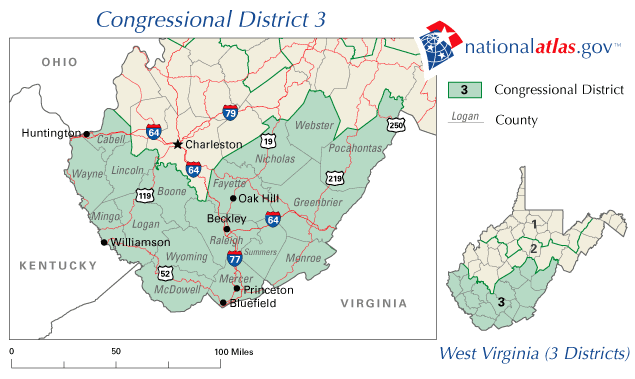

Incumbent Democrat Nick Rahall defeated Republican Kim Wolfe, the Sheriff of Cabell County. This district covers the southern part of the state.

=== Predictions ===
Source	Ranking	As of
The Cook Political Report	Safe D	November 6, 2006
Rothenberg	Safe D	November 6, 2006
Sabato's Crystal Ball	Safe D	November 6, 2006
Real Clear Politics	Safe D	November 7, 2006
CQ Politics	Safe D	November 7, 2006

West Virginia's 3rd congressional district election, 2006
Party	Candidate	Votes	%
Democratic	Nick Rahall (incumbent)	92,413	69.36
Republican	Kim Wolfe	40,820	30.64
Total votes		133,233	100.00
Democratic hold			
