= Mike Callaghan =

American lawyer

Personal details
- Born: March 31, 1963 (age 63) Richwood, West Virginia, U.S.
- Party: Democratic
- Education: University of Virginia; West Virginia University, Morgantown

Mike Callaghan (born March 31, 1963) is a former Assistant United States Attorney and a politician. In 2006, he was the Democratic nominee for West Virginia's 2nd congressional district. He unsuccessfully challenged Republican incumbent Shelley Moore Capito.

== Background ==
Callaghan grew up in Richwood, a small town in Nicholas County, West Virginia. He attended Richwood High School and the University of Virginia, where he obtained a bachelor's degree in engineering. He then attended the West Virginia University College of Law where he served as editor-in-chief of the West Virginia Law Review. He currently practices law at the firm Neely & Callaghan, www.neelycallaghan.com, in Charleston, West Virginia. He also is an owner of Great Expectations Realty www.greatexpectationsrealty.com in Charleston, West Virginia.

== Professional career ==
For nine years, Callaghan was as an Assistant U.S. Attorney for the Southern District of West Virginia, serving from 1997 until 2001 as head of the criminal division. In 2001, Mike was appointed Secretary of the Department of Environmental Protection by then Governor Bob Wise.

== Political career ==
Callaghan has served as Chairman of the West Virginia Democratic Party. He was honored at the 2004 Jefferson-Jackson Dinner with the Franklin D. Roosevelt award, naming him the West Virginia Democrat of the Year.

== Family life ==
Callaghan married Cheri Heflin.
