= 1994 United States House of Representatives elections in West Virginia =

- November 8, 1994

All 3 West Virginia seats to the United States House of Representatives
| | Majority party | Minority party |
|---|---|---|
| Party | Democratic | Republican |
| Last election | 3 | 0 |
| Seats won | 3 | 0 |
| Seat change | Steady | Steady |
| Popular vote | 268,901 | 137,663 |
| Percentage | 66.14% | 33.86% |
| Swing | ▼11.97% | ▲11.97% |

Democratic
50–60%
60–70%
70–80%
80–90%
Republican
50–60%

The 1994 United States House of Representatives elections in West Virginia were held on November 8, 1994, to determine who would represent the state of West Virginia in the United States House of Representatives. West Virginia has three seats in the House, apportioned according to the 1990 United States census. Representatives are elected for two-year terms.

== Overview ==
United States House of Representatives elections in West Virginia, 1994
| Party | Votes | Percentage | Seats | +/– |
|---|---|---|---|---|
| Democratic | 268,901 | 66.14% | 3 | - |
| Republican | 137,663 | 33.86% | 0 | - |
| Totals | 406,564 | 100.00% | 3 | — |

== District 1 ==
Incumbent Democrat Alan Mollohan defeated Republican Sally Rossy Riley. This district covers the northern part of the state.

West Virginia's 1st congressional district election, 1994
| Party | Candidate | Votes | % |
|---|---|---|---|
| Democratic | Alan Mollohan (incumbent) | 103,177 | 70.30 |
| Republican | Sally Rossy Riley | 43,590 | 29.70 |
| Total votes | | 146,767 | 100.00 |
| Democratic hold | | | |

== District 2 ==
Incumbent Democrat Bob Wise defeated Republican Samuel A. Cravotta. This district covers the central part of the state.

West Virginia's 2nd congressional district election, 1994
| Party | Candidate | Votes | % |
|---|---|---|---|
| Democratic | Bob Wise (incumbent) | 90,757 | 63.71 |
| Republican | Samuel A. Cravotta | 51,691 | 36.29 |
| Total votes | | 142,448 | 100.00 |
| Democratic hold | | | |

== District 3 ==
Incumbent Democrat Nick Rahall defeated Republican Ben Waldman. This district covers the southern part of the state.

West Virginia's 3rd congressional district election, 1994
| Party | Candidate | Votes | % |
|---|---|---|---|
| Democratic | Nick Rahall (incumbent) | 74,967 | 63.88 |
| Republican | Ben Waldman | 42,382 | 36.12 |
| Total votes | | 117,349 | 100.00 |
| Democratic hold | | | |
