= 1998 United States House of Representatives elections in West Virginia =

- November 3, 1998

All 3 West Virginia seats to the United States House of Representatives
	Majority party	Minority party	Third party
Party	Democratic	Libertarian	Republican
Last election	3	0	0
Seats won	3	0	0
Seat change	Steady	Steady	Steady
Popular vote	283,272	38,869	29,136
Percentage	80.64%	11.07%	8.29%
Swing	▼7.12%	▲11.07%	▼3.95%
- Democratic 60–70% 70–80% 80–90% >90%

The 1998 United States House of Representatives elections in West Virginia were held on November 3, 1998, to determine who will represent the state of West Virginia in the United States House of Representatives. West Virginia has three seats in the House, apportioned according to the 1990 United States census. Representatives are elected for two-year terms. As of 2022, this is the last time that the Democrats have swept all of West Virginia's congressional districts.

== Overview ==
United States House of Representatives elections in West Virginia, 1998
Party	Votes	Percentage	Seats	+/–
Democratic	283,272	80.64%	3	-
Libertarian	38,869	11.07%	0	-
Republican	29,136	8.29%	0	-
Totals	351,277	100.00%	3	—

== District 1 ==
Incumbent Democrat Alan Mollohan defeated Libertarian Richard Kerr. This district covers the northern part of the state.

West Virginia's 1st congressional district election, 1998
Party	Candidate	Votes	%
Democratic	Alan Mollohan (incumbent)	105,101	84.68
Libertarian	Richard Kerr	19,013	15.32
Total votes		124,114	100.00
Democratic hold			

== District 2 ==
Incumbent Democrat Bob Wise defeated Republican Sally Anne Kay and Libertarian John Brown. This district covers the central part of the state.

West Virginia's 2nd congressional district election, 1998
Party	Candidate	Votes	%
Democratic	Bob Wise (incumbent)	99,357	72.97
Republican	Sally Anne Kay	29,136	21.40
Libertarian	John Brown	7,660	5.63
Total votes		136,153	100.00
Democratic hold			

== District 3 ==
Incumbent Democrat Nick Rahall defeated Libertarian Joe Whelan. This district covers the southern part of the state.

West Virginia's 3rd congressional district election, 1998
Party	Candidate	Votes	%
Democratic	Nick Rahall (incumbent)	78,814	86.60
Libertarian	Jeff Robinson	12,196	13.40
Total votes		91,010	100.00
Democratic hold			
