= 1996 United States House of Representatives elections in West Virginia =

- November 5, 1996

All 3 West Virginia seats to the United States House of Representatives
	Majority party	Minority party
Party	Democratic	Republican
Last election	3	0
Seats won	3	0
Seat change	Steady	Steady
Popular vote	458,435	63,933
Percentage	87.76%	12.24%
Swing	▲21.62%	▼21.62%
- Democratic 50–60% 60–70% 70–80% 80–90% 90–100%

The 1996 United States House of Representatives elections in West Virginia were held on November 5, 1996, to determine who will represent the state of West Virginia in the United States House of Representatives. West Virginia has three seats in the House, apportioned according to the 1990 United States census. Representatives are elected for two-year terms.

== Overview ==
United States House of Representatives elections in West Virginia, 1996
Party	Votes	Percentage	Seats	+/–
Democratic	458,435	87.76%	3	-
Republican	63,933	12.24%	0	-
Totals	522,368	100.00%	3	—

== District 1 ==
Incumbent Democrat Alan Mollohan was re-elected unopposed. This district covers the northern part of the state.

West Virginia's 1st congressional district election, 1996
Party	Candidate	Votes	%
Democratic	Alan Mollohan (incumbent)	171,334	100.00
Total votes		171,334	100.00
Democratic hold			

== District 2 ==
Incumbent Democrat Bob Wise defeated Republican Greg Morris. This district covers the central part of the state.

West Virginia's 2nd congressional district election, 1996
Party	Candidate	Votes	%
Democratic	Bob Wise (incumbent)	141,551	68.89
Republican	Greg Morris	63,933	31.11
Total votes		205,484	100.00
Democratic hold			

== District 3 ==
Incumbent Democrat Nick Rahall was re-elected unopposed. This district covers the southern part of the state.

West Virginia's 3rd congressional district election, 1996
Party	Candidate	Votes	%
Democratic	Nick Rahall (incumbent)	145,550	100.00
Total votes		145,550	100.00
Democratic hold			
