= 2004 United States House of Representatives elections in West Virginia =

- November 2, 2004

All 3 West Virginia seats to the United States House of Representatives
	Majority party	Minority party
Party	Democratic	Republican
Last election	2	1
Seats won	2	1
Seat change	Steady	Steady
Popular vote	415,396	303,042
Percentage	57.56%	41.99%
Swing	▼8.48%	▲8.11%

Democratic
40–50%
50–60%
60–70%
70–80%
80–90%
Republican
50–60%
60–70%
70–80%

The 2004 United States House of Representatives elections in West Virginia were held on November 2, 2004, to determine who will represent the state of West Virginia in the United States House of Representatives. West Virginia has three seats in the House, apportioned according to the 2000 United States census. Representatives are elected for two-year terms.

== Overview ==
United States House of Representatives elections in West Virginia, 2004
Party	Votes	Percentage	Seats	+/–
Democratic	415,396	57.56%	2	—
Republican	303,042	41.99%	1	—
Mountain (Green)	3,218	0.45%	0	—
Totals	721,656	100.00%	3	—

== District 1 ==
2004 West Virginia's 1st congressional district election
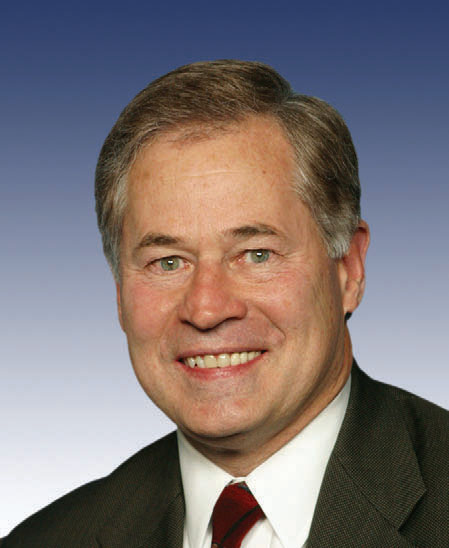

Nominee	Alan Mollohan	Chris Wakim
Party	Democratic	Republican
Popular vote	166,583	79,196
Percentage	67.77%	32.22%
- County results Mollohan: 50–60% 60–70% 70–80% Wakim: 50–60%
U.S. Representative before election
Alan Mollohan
Democratic
Elected U.S. Representative
Alan Mollohan
Democratic

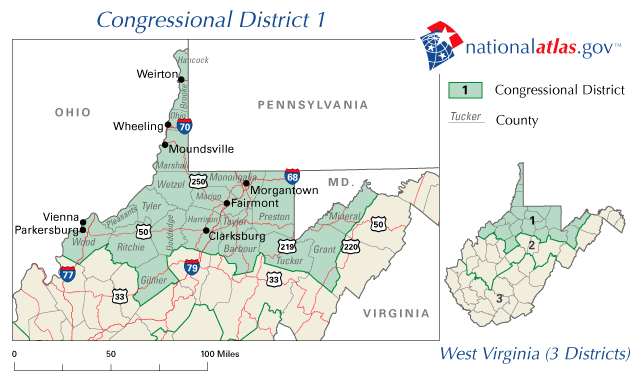

Incumbent Democrat Alan Mollohan defeated Republican Alan Lee Parks. This district covers the northern part of the state.

=== Predictions ===
Source	Ranking	As of
The Cook Political Report	Safe D	October 29, 2004
Sabato's Crystal Ball	Safe D	November 1, 2004

=== Results ===
West Virginia's 1st congressional district election, 2004
Party	Candidate	Votes	%
Democratic	Alan Mollohan (incumbent)	166,583	67.77
Republican	Chris Wakim	79,196	32.22
Total votes		245,779	100.00
Democratic hold			

== District 2 ==
2004 West Virginia's 2nd congressional district election
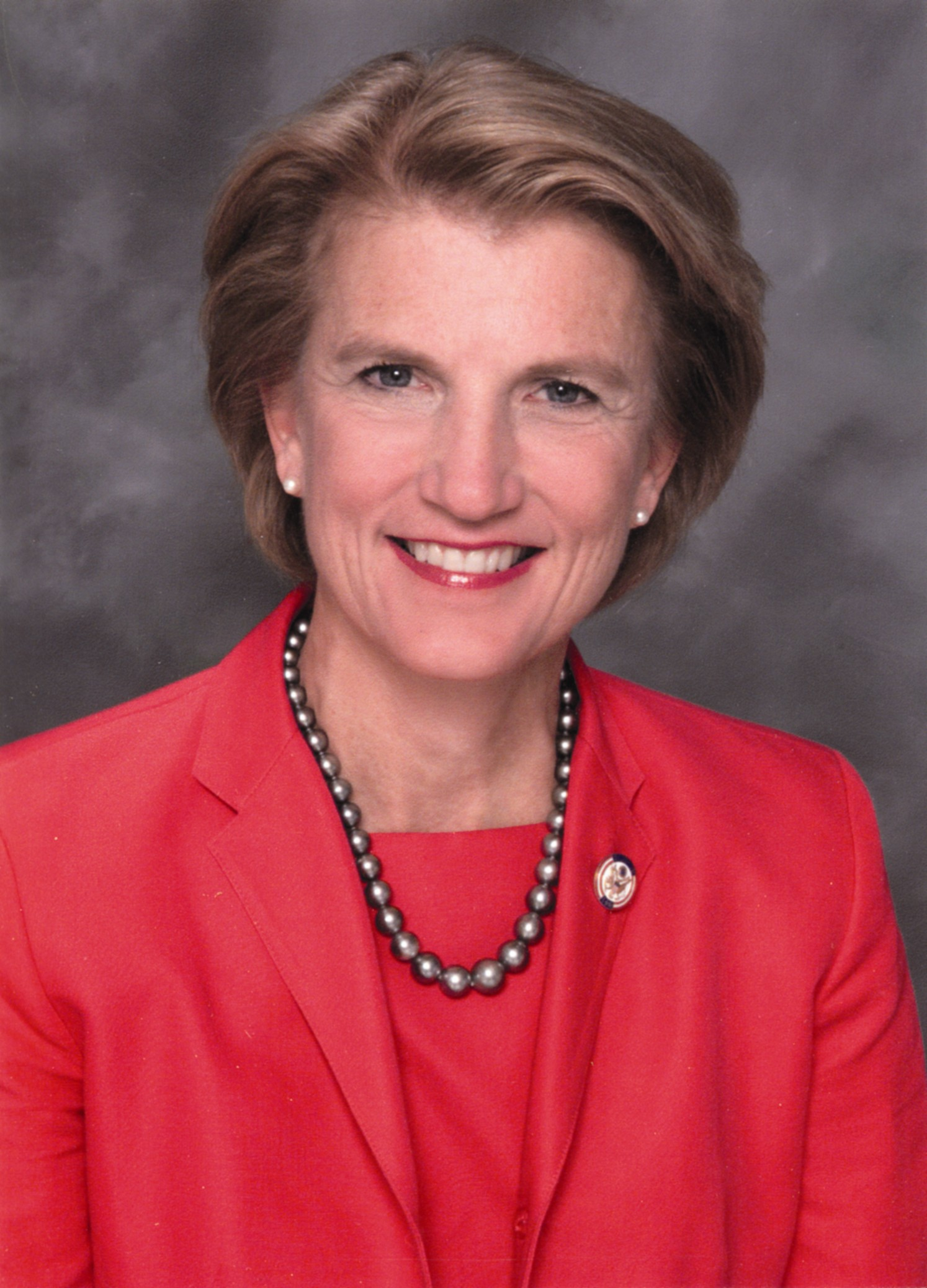

Nominee	Shelley Moore Capito	Erik Wells
Party	Republican	Democratic
Popular vote	147,676	106,131
Percentage	57.46%	41.29%
- County results Capito: 50–60% 60–70% 70–80% Wells: 40–50% 50–60%
U.S. Representative before election
Shelley Moore Capito
Republican
Elected U.S. Representative
Shelley Moore Capito
Republican

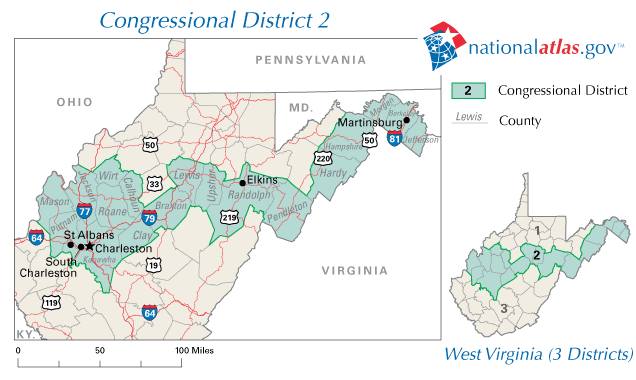

Incumbent Republican Shelley Moore Capito defeated Democrat Erik Wells, a State Senator. This district covers the central part of the state.

=== Predictions ===
Source	Ranking	As of
The Cook Political Report	Safe R	October 29, 2004
Sabato's Crystal Ball	Safe R	November 1, 2004

=== Results ===
West Virginia's 2nd congressional district election, 2004
Party	Candidate	Votes	%
Republican	Shelley Moore Capito (incumbent)	147,676	57.46
Democratic	Erik Wells	106,131	41.29
Mountain	Julian Martin	3,218	1.25
Total votes		257,025	100.00
Republican hold			

== District 3 ==
2004 West Virginia's 3rd congressional district election

Nominee	Nick Rahall	Rick Snuffer
Party	Democratic	Republican
Popular vote	142,682	76,170
Percentage	65.20%	34.80%
- County results Rahall: 50–60% 60–70% 70–80% 80–90% Snuffer: 50–60%
U.S. Representative before election
Nick Rahall
Democratic
Elected U.S. Representative
Nick Rahall
Democratic

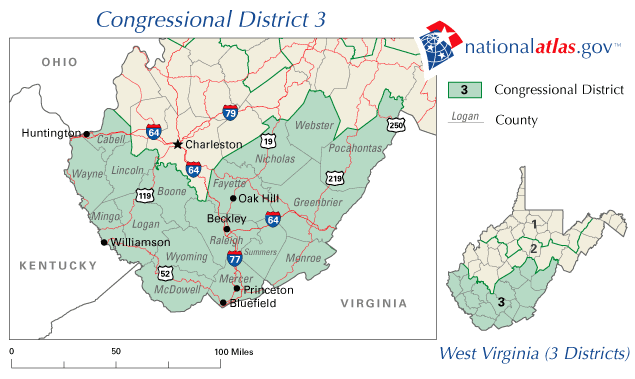

Incumbent Democrat Nick Rahall defeated Republican Delegate Rick Snuffer. This district covers the southern part of the state.

=== Predictions ===
Source	Ranking	As of
The Cook Political Report	Safe D	October 29, 2004
Sabato's Crystal Ball	Safe D	November 1, 2004

=== Results ===
West Virginia's 3rd congressional district election, 2004
Party	Candidate	Votes	%
Democratic	Nick Rahall (incumbent)	142,682	65.20
Republican	Rick Snuffer	76,170	34.80
Total votes		218,852	100.00
Democratic hold			
