= 2002 United States House of Representatives elections in West Virginia =

- November 5, 2002

All 3 West Virginia seats to the United States House of Representatives
	Majority party	Minority party
Party	Democratic	Republican
Last election	2	1
Seats won	2	1
Seat change	Steady	Steady
Popular vote	264,124	135,505
Percentage	66.04%	33.88%
Swing	▼6.52%	▲15.12%

Democratic
50–60%
60–70%
70–80%
80–90%
90–100%
Republican
50–60%
60–70%

The 2002 United States House of Representatives elections in West Virginia were held on November 5, 2002, to determine who will represent the state of West Virginia in the United States House of Representatives. West Virginia has three seats in the House, apportioned according to the 2000 United States census. Representatives are elected for two-year terms.

== Overview ==
United States House of Representatives elections in West Virginia, 2002
Party	Votes	Percentage	Seats	+/–
Democratic	264,124	66.04%	2	—
Republican	135,505	33.88%	1	—
Write-ins	320	0.08%	0	—
Totals	399,949	100.00%	3	—

== District 1 ==
2002 West Virginia's 1st congressional district election
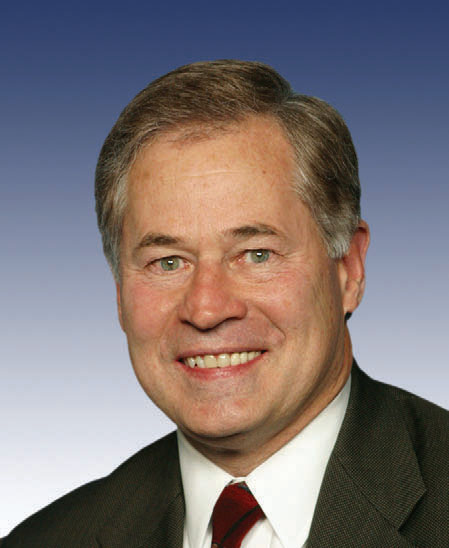
Nominee	Alan Mollohan
Party	Democratic
Popular vote	110,941
Percentage	99.71%
- County results Mollohan: 90–100%
U.S. Representative before election
Alan Mollohan
Democratic
Elected U.S. Representative
Alan Mollohan
Democratic

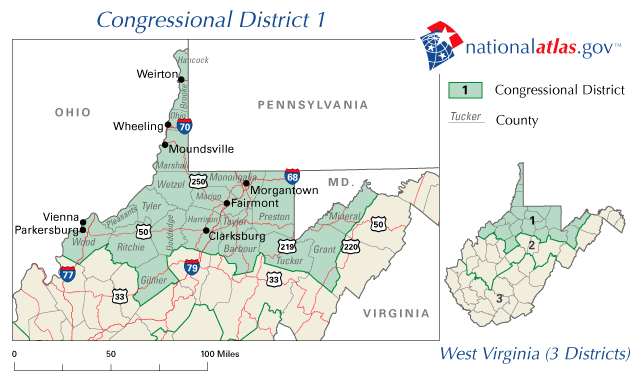

Incumbent Democrat Alan Mollohan was re-elected unopposed. This district covers the northern part of the state.

=== Predictions ===
Source	Ranking	As of
Sabato's Crystal Ball	Safe D	November 4, 2002
New York Times	Safe D	October 14, 2002

West Virginia's 1st congressional district election, 2002
Party	Candidate	Votes	%
Democratic	Alan Mollohan (incumbent)	110,941	99.71
write-ins		320	0.29
Total votes		111,261	100.00
Democratic hold			

== District 2 ==
2002 West Virginia's 2nd congressional district election
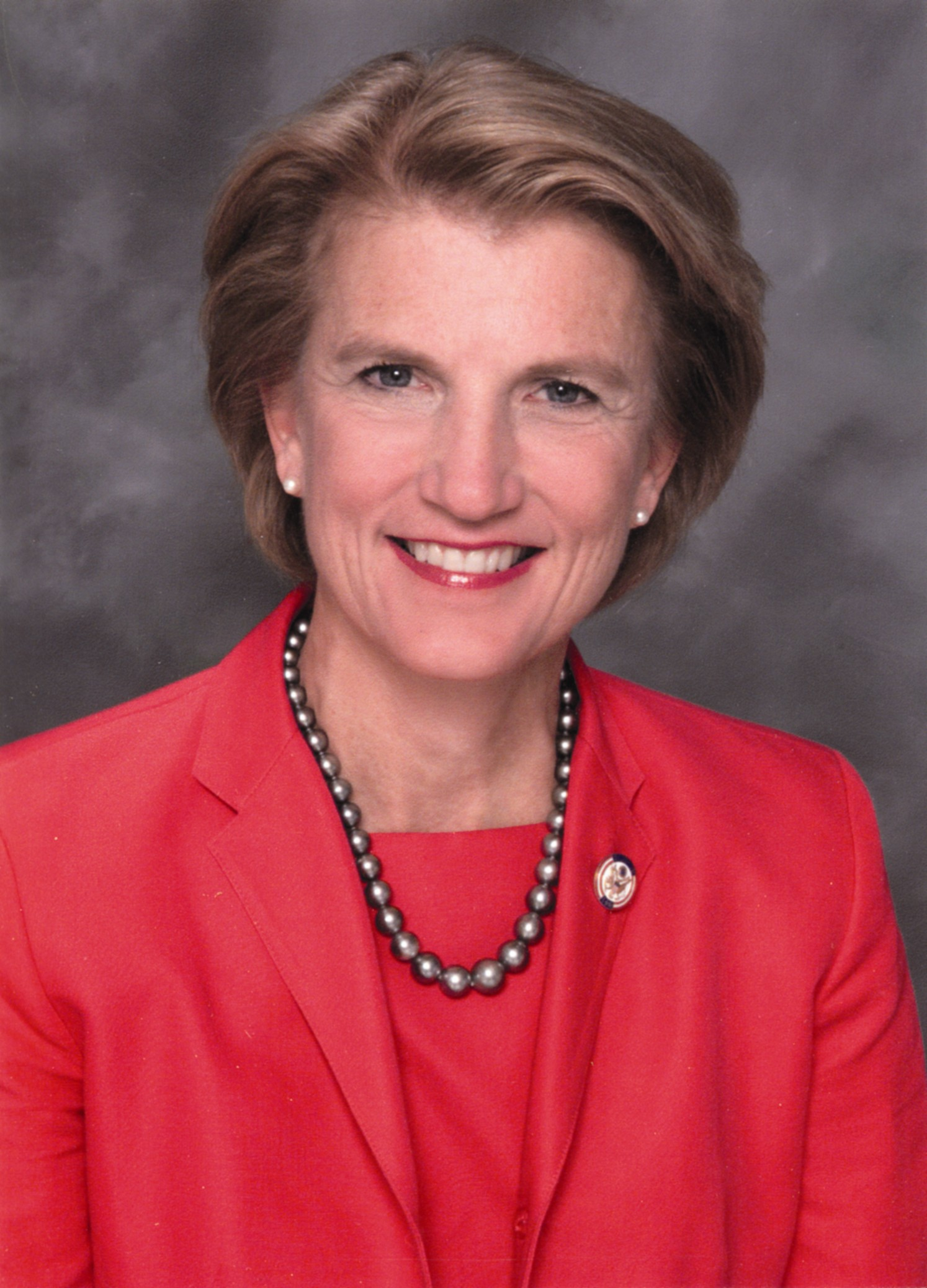

Nominee	Shelley Moore Capito	Jim Humphreys
Party	Republican	Democratic
Popular vote	98,276	65,400
Percentage	60.04%	39.96%
- County results Capito: 50–60% 60–70% Humphreys: 50–60%
U.S. Representative before election
Shelley Moore Capito
Republican
Elected U.S. Representative
Shelley Moore Capito
Republican

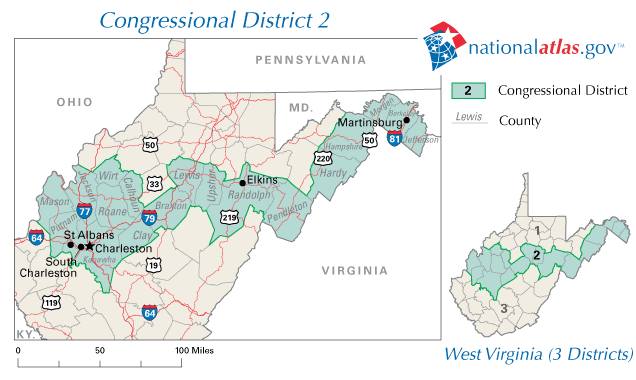

Incumbent Republican Shelley Moore Capito defeated Democrat Jim Humphreys. This district covers the central part of the state.

=== Predictions ===
Source	Ranking	As of
Sabato's Crystal Ball	Lean R	November 4, 2002
New York Times	Lean R	October 14, 2002

West Virginia's 2nd congressional district election, 2002
Party	Candidate	Votes	%
Republican	Shelley Moore Capito (incumbent)	98,276	60.04
Democratic	Jim Humphreys	65,400	39.96
Total votes		163,676	100.00
Republican hold			

== District 3 ==
2002 West Virginia's 3rd congressional district election

Nominee	Nick Rahall	Paul Chapman
Party	Democratic	Republican
Popular vote	87,783	37,229
Percentage	70.22%	29.78%
- County results Rahall: 50–60% 60–70% 70–80% 80–90%
U.S. Representative before election
Nick Rahall
Democratic
Elected U.S. Representative
Nick Rahall
Democratic

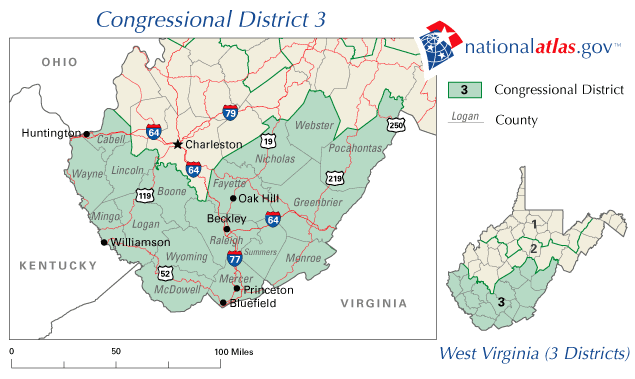

Incumbent Democrat Nick Rahall defeated Republican Paul Chapman. This district covers the southern part of the state.

=== Predictions ===
Source	Ranking	As of
Sabato's Crystal Ball	Safe D	November 4, 2002
New York Times	Safe D	October 14, 2002

West Virginia's 3rd congressional district election, 2002
Party	Candidate	Votes	%
Democratic	Nick Rahall (incumbent)	87,783	70.22
Republican	Paul Chapman	37,229	29.78
Total votes		125,012	100.00
Democratic hold			
