= Harley O. Staggers Jr. =

American politician and lawyer (born 1951)

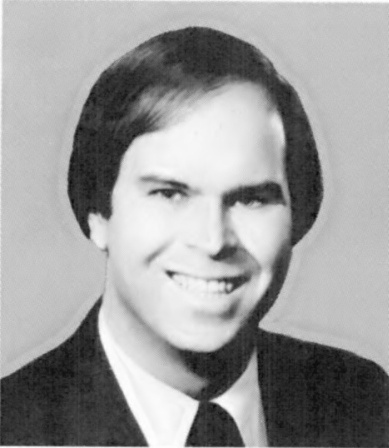

Member of the U.S. House of Representatives from West Virginia's 2nd district
- In office January 3, 1983 – January 3, 1993
- Preceded by: Cleve Benedict
- Succeeded by: Alan Mollohan (redistricted)

Member of the West Virginia Senate from the 16th district
- In office 1980–1982
- Preceded by: William Oates
- Succeeded by: Vernon Whitacre

Personal details
- Born: Harley Orrin Staggers Jr. February 22, 1951 (age 75) Washington, D.C., U.S.
- Party: Democratic
- Spouse: Leslie Sergy (m. 1986)
- Relations: Margaret Staggers (sister)
- Children: 3
- Parent: Harley Staggers (father)
- Education: Harvard University (BA); West Virginia University (JD)
- Occupation: Lawyer; politician
- Nickname: Buckey Staggers

Harley Orrin "Buckey" Staggers Jr. (born February 22, 1951) is an American politician and lawyer from West Virginia. He served five terms as a Democrat in the United States House of Representatives from 1983 to 1993.

== Early life and education ==
Staggers was born in Washington, D.C. His father, Harley Staggers Sr., was a Democratic Congressman from West Virginia from 1949 until 1981, when he declined to run for a seventeenth term.

Staggers, Jr. graduated from Harvard University and the West Virginia University College of Law.

== Political career ==
He served as an assistant West Virginia Attorney General before serving one term in the West Virginia Senate.

=== Congress ===
After Republican congressman, Cleve Benedict, gave up his seat after one term to run against Senator Robert Byrd, Harley Staggers Jr. ran for the seat and won. He was reelected four more times, defeating Oliver Luck in his fourth re-election.

=== Defeat ===
Harley Staggers Jr. lost his seat after West Virginia lost one congressional seat following the 1990 Census. Most of his former 2nd District's territory was merged with the Charleston-based 3rd District of fellow Democrat Bob Wise to form a new 2nd District. However, his home in Mineral County was drawn into the 1st District, represented by fellow Democrat Alan Mollohan. Staggers opted to challenge Mollohan in the Democratic primary and was defeated.

== Later career ==
Staggers currently practices law in Keyser, West Virginia.

== Personal life ==
He married Leslie R. Sergy in 1986. They have three children. His son Harley O. Staggers III is also a lawyer.

== Notes ==
U.S. House of Representatives
Preceded by Bob Wise	Member of the U.S. House of Representatives from West Virginia's 2nd congressional district 1983–1993	Succeeded by Cleve Benedict
U.S. order of precedence (ceremonial)
Preceded by Lynn Jenkins as Former U.S. Representative	Order of precedence of the United States as Former U.S. Representative	Succeeded by Alex Mooney as Former U.S. Representative
