= 2000 United States House of Representatives elections in West Virginia =

- November 7, 2000

All 3 West Virginia seats to the United States House of Representatives
	Majority party	Minority party	Third party
Party	Democratic	Republican	Libertarian
Last election	3	0	0
Seats won	2	1	0
Seat change	▼1	▲1	Steady
Popular vote	420,784	108,769	50,319
Percentage	72.56%	18.76%	8.68%
Swing	▼8.08%	▲10.47%	▼2.39%

Democratic
40–50%
50–60%
60–70%
70–80%
80–90%
90–100%
Republican
40–50%
50–60%

The 2000 United States House of Representatives elections in West Virginia were held on November 7, 2000, to determine who will represent the state of West Virginia in the United States House of Representatives. West Virginia has three seats in the House, apportioned according to the 1990 United States census. Representatives are elected for two-year terms.

== Overview ==
United States House of Representatives elections in West Virginia, 2000
Party	Votes	Percentage	Seats	+/–
Democratic	420,784	72.56%	2	-1
Republican	108,769	18.76%	1	+1
Libertarian	50,319	8.68%	0	—
Totals	579,872	100.00%	3	—

== District 1 ==
2000 West Virginia's 1st congressional district election
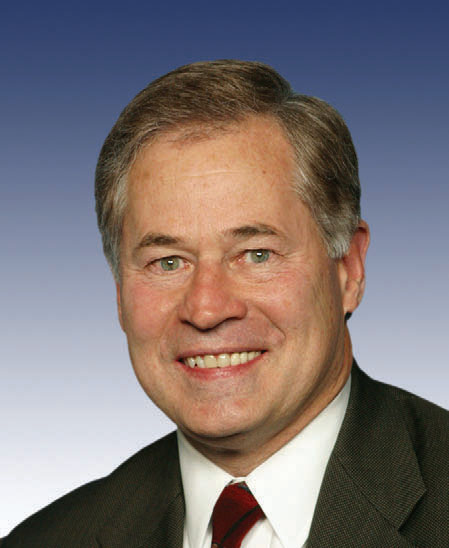

Nominee	Alan Mollohan	Richard Kerr
Party	Democratic	Libertarian
Popular vote	170,974	23,797
Percentage	87.8%	12.2%
- County results Mollohan: 70–80% 80–90% 90–100%
U.S. Representative before election
Alan Mollohan
Democratic
Elected U.S. Representative
Alan Mollohan
Democratic

Incumbent Democrat Alan Mollohan defeated Libertarian Richard Kerr. This district covered the northern part of the state.

West Virginia's 1st congressional district election, 2000
Party	Candidate	Votes	%
Democratic	Alan Mollohan (incumbent)	170,974	87.78
Libertarian	Richard Kerr	23,797	12.22
Total votes		194,771	100.00
Democratic hold			

== District 2 ==
2000 West Virginia's 2nd congressional district election
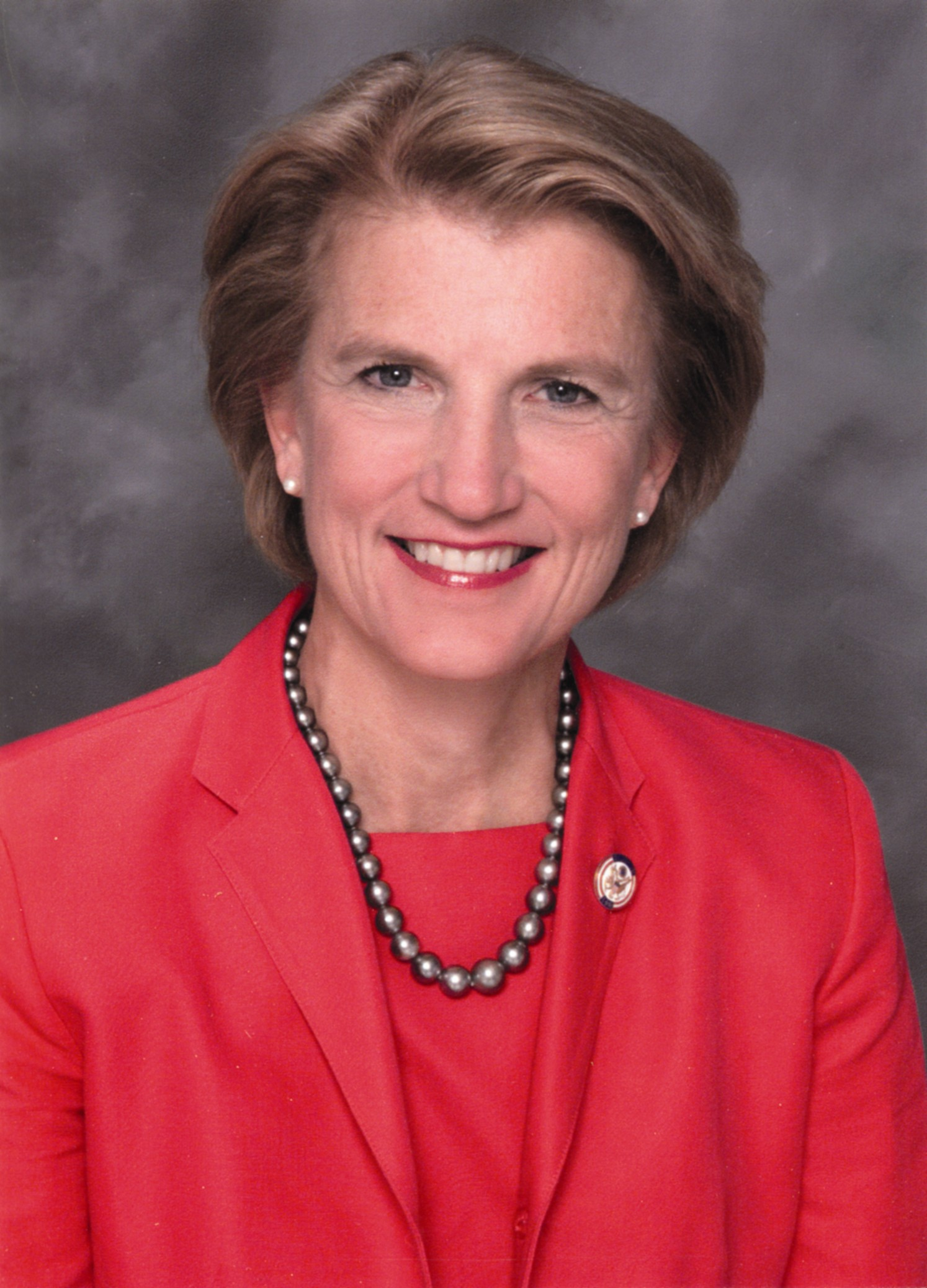

Nominee	Shelley Moore Capito	Jim Humphreys	John Brown
Party	Republican	Democratic	Libertarian
Popular vote	108,769	103,003	12,543
Percentage	48.5%	45.9%	5.6%
- County results Capito: 40–50% 50–60% Humphreys: 40–50% 50–60% 60–70%
U.S. Representative before election
Bob Wise
Republican
Elected U.S. Representative
Shelley Moore Capito
Republican

Republican Shelley Moore Capito defeated Democrat Jim Humphreys after incumbent Bob Wise retired to run for governor. Capito's victory marked the first time a Republican was elected to this district since 1980. This district covers the central part of the state.

=== General election ===
==== Polling ====
Poll source	Date(s)	Sample size	Margin of error	Shelley Moore Capito (R)	Jim Humphreys (D)	Other / undecided (Note: Calculated by taking the difference of 100% and all other candidates combined.)
West Virginia Research Center	October 25, 2000	424	—	32%	38%	30%

==== Results ====
West Virginia's 2nd congressional district election, 2000
Party	Candidate	Votes	%
Republican	Shelley Moore Capito	108,769	48.49
Democratic	Jim Humphreys	103,003	45.92
Libertarian	John Brown	12,543	5.59
Total votes		224,315	100.00
Republican gain from Democratic			

== District 3 ==
2000 West Virginia's 3rd congressional district election

Nominee	Nick Rahall	Jeff Robinson
Party	Democratic	Libertarian
Popular vote	146,807	13,979
Percentage	91.3%	8.7%
- County results Nick Joe Rahall: 80–90% 90–100%
U.S. Representative before election
Nick Rahall
Democratic
Elected U.S. Representative
Nick Rahall
Democratic

Incumbent Democrat Nick Rahall defeated Libertarian Jeff Robinson. This district covers the southern part of the state.

West Virginia's 3rd congressional district election, 2000
Party	Candidate	Votes	%
Democratic	Nick Rahall (incumbent)	146,807	91.31
Libertarian	Jeff Robinson	13,979	8.69
Total votes		160,786	100.00
Democratic hold			
