= Chris Wakim =

American politician

Member of the West Virginia House of Delegates from the 3rd district
- In office 2003–2007

Personal details
- Born: Christopher Wakim; December 19, 1957 (age 68) West Virginia, U.S.
- Party: Republican
- Children: Laura Chapman
- Education: United States Military Academy; Harvard University

Chris Wakim (born December 19, 1957) is a former member of the West Virginia House of Delegates having represented the Third District from 2003 to 2007. He was also the 2008 Republican nominee for the First Senatorial District in West Virginia. The Third District represents the majority of citizens in Ohio County, WV. In the 77th West Virginia House of Delegates, Wakim was the Ranking Republican on the Veterans Affairs/Homeland Security committee. The grandson of Lebanese immigrants, he graduated from West Point in 1980.

During his 11-year Army career, Wakim attained the rank of captain, along the way suffering a broken back, crushed elbow, and reconstructed knee while an infantry officer. He now has disabled veteran status. Wakim has not provided specific details about how the accidents occurred.

His father is orthopedic surgeon Paul Wakim.

== 2006 campaign for the U.S. House of Representatives ==
Wakim was unsuccessful in defeating incumbent Democrat Alan Mollohan in the West Virginia 1st Congressional district. The NRCC saw Mollohan's seat as being vulnerable because of allegations over his financial disclosures, investment gains, and use of earmarks.

Wakim's campaign was supported by top Republican leadership in 2006. Vice President Dick Cheney, Speaker of the House Dennis Hastert, and Representative Roy Blunt (R-MO) assisted in the unsuccessful campaign. By July 1, 2006, Wakim had $318,000 cash-on-hand.

== Controversies ==
In August 2006, Wakim's opponent questioned the accuracy of biography and curriculum vitae was brought into question, specifically Wakim's specific college degrees and combat veteran status during the Persian Gulf War.

=== Gulf War veteran ===
Wakim’s claim that he is a "Gulf War veteran" has been challenged. "To be considered a veteran of the first Gulf War, one must receive the Southwest Asia Service Medal. The absence of the medal makes one a Gulf War-era veteran," said a spokesman for the Veterans of Foreign Wars. Wakim said he does not have that medal, although the Federal government designated that those who served on active duty during a specified period are indeed veterans of that war. Wakim served during that period designated as the Gulf War. Furthermore, records show he was stationed at Fort Devens in Massachusetts from 1988 to 1991, the period encompassing that of the Gulf War, and applied his knowledge of desert operations by training and evaluating Guard and Reserve units for deployment to the Middle East.

In a 2006 interview with the Arab American Institute, Wakim discussed the details of his Gulf War service, saying his background as an Arab-American and his education were valuable to the Army. "My company specialized in desert warfare, and certainly that was a timely specialty because of the first Gulf War," he said. “I lent my expertise as a desert fighter to develop our fighting force. ...I can tell you from personal experience that once the first bullet is shot, the best-laid plans usually go by the wayside."

== See also ==
- List of members of the 77th West Virginia House of Delegates
