= Alan Mollohan =

American politician (born 1943)

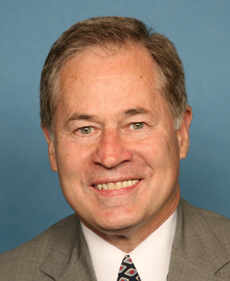

Member of the U.S. House of Representatives from West Virginia's 1st district
- In office January 3, 1983 – January 3, 2011
- Preceded by: Bob Mollohan
- Succeeded by: David McKinley

Personal details
- Born: Alan Bowlby Mollohan; May 14, 1943 (age 83) Fairmont, West Virginia, U.S.
- Party: Democratic
- Spouse: Barbara Whiting
- Children: 5
- Relatives: Bob Mollohan (father)
- Education: College of William and Mary (BA); West Virginia University (JD)

Military service
- Branch/service: United States Army
- Years of service: 1970–1983
- Rank: Captain
- Unit: United States Army Reserve
- Mollohan's voice Mollohan discusses FY2008 appropriations for the Commerce, Justice, and Science departments. Recorded July 25, 2007

Alan Bowlby Mollohan (born May 14, 1943) is an American politician who served as the U.S. representative for West Virginia's 1st congressional district from 1983 to 2011. He was a member of the Democratic Party and the Blue Dog Coalition.

The district encompasses the northern part of the state; it is based in Wheeling and includes Parkersburg, Morgantown, Fairmont and Clarksburg. He served on the House Appropriations Committee and was ranking Democrat on the Ethics Committee until being asked to step down in 2006. He was defeated in the Democratic primary election held on May 11, 2010, by Mike Oliverio.

== Early life and education ==
Born in Fairmont, West Virginia, Mollohan is the son of former U.S. Representative Robert Mollohan. He attended Greenbrier Military School and graduated from the College of William & Mary. Thereafter, Mollohan completed a Juris Doctor at West Virginia University College of Law.

== Early career ==
He served as "Of Counsel" for the Huntington, West Virginia branch of the law firm Nelson Mullins Riley & Scarborough.

=== Military service ===
He served in the United States Army Reserve from 1970 to 1983, reaching the rank of captain.

== U.S. House of Representatives ==
=== Committee assignments ===
- Committee on Appropriations
  - Subcommittee on Commerce, Justice, Science, and Related Agencies (Chairman)
  - Subcommittee on Homeland Security
  - Subcommittee on Interior, Environment, and Related Agencies

== Political campaigns ==
When Mollohan's father retired in 1982 after 18 years in Congress spread out over two stints, his son won a very competitive contest to succeed him. He faced another close race in 1984, but was unopposed for a third term in 1986. He did not face serious opposition in a general election again. Indeed, the Republicans only put up a candidate against him four other times, in 1988, 1990, 1994 and 2006. He ran unopposed in 1992, 1996, 2002 and 2008 and only faced Libertarian Richard Kerr in 1998 and 2000.

He faced stiff electoral competition when, in 1992, West Virginia lost a House seat due to the 1990 Census. The redistricting placed Mollohan against 2nd District Congressman Buckey Staggers. No other party put up a candidate, meaning that the Democratic primary was tantamount to election. It was predicted to be a tough primary even though the new district was more Mollohan's district than Staggers', but Mollohan succeeded in winning his party's nomination with 60% of the vote.

=== 2010 ===
Mollohan faced a Democratic primary challenge on May 11, 2010, and lost to State senator Mike Oliverio, 56% to 44%. It was Mollohan's first contested primary since he faced Buckey Staggers in 1992 after their Congressional districts were merged.

Since his first election in 1982 he only faced a total of six Republican challengers, the most recent being former state delegate Chris Wakim in 2006. In that race, Mollohan won 64% of the vote.

Mollahan lost the primary to Oliverio, who ultimately narrowly lost the general election to David McKinley.

== Controversies ==
On February 28, 2006, the National Legal and Policy Center filed a 500-page ethics complaint against Mollohan, alleging that the congressman misrepresented his assets on financial disclosure forms. Mollohan's real estate holdings and other assets have increased from $562,000 in 2000 to at least $6.3 million in 2004. For the period 1996 through 2004, NLPC alleged that his Financial Disclosure Reports failed to disclose real estate, corporate and financial assets that public records showed were owned by Mollohan and his wife.

On April 7, 2006, The New York Times reported that Mollohan "has fueled five non-profit groups in his West Virginia district with $250 million in earmark funding." Mollohan created these nonprofit groups, which include the West Virginia High Technology Consortium Foundation, Institute for Scientific Research, Canaan Valley Institute, Vandalia Heritage Foundation, and MountainMade Foundation. Leaders of these groups were sometimes investors with him, possibly leading to his own personal gain.

On April 21, 2006, House Minority Leader Nancy Pelosi announced that Mollohan would temporarily step down as the Ranking Democrat on the House Ethics Committee. Howard Berman of California took Mollohan's place.

On April 25, 2006, The Wall Street Journal reported that Mollohan and CEO Dale R. McBride of FMW Composite Systems Inc. of Bridgeport, West Virginia made a joint purchase of a 300-acre (1.2 km^{2}) farm along West Virginia's Cheat River. Mollohan had directed a $2.1 million government contract earmarked to FWM Composite Systems to develop lightweight payload pallets for space-shuttle missions. Federal Bureau of Investigation agents have asked questions in Washington and West Virginia about Mollohan’s investments and whether they were properly disclosed, according to the Journal. Mollohan had previously acknowledged he may have made inadvertent mistakes on financial disclosure forms, and in June he filed corrections to his disclosure statements.

In January 2010, the U.S. Department of Justice stated that no charges would be filed against Mollohan and that it had closed its investigation. Ben Friedman of the U.S. Attorney's office in Washington told CREW that the Justice Department has "closed the investigation into the case."

== Electoral history ==
2010 Democratic Primary Results, West Virginia 1st Congressional District
Party	Candidate	Votes	%
Democratic	Mike Oliverio	36,135	55.91%
Democratic	Alan Mollohan (incumbent)	28,500	44.09%
Total votes		64,635	100.0%

2008 West Virginia's 1st congressional district election
Party	Candidate	Votes	%
Democratic	Alan Mollohan	187,734	99.9
Write-In	Ted Osgood	69	0.0
Write-In	R.J. Smith	61	0.0

2006 West Virginia's 1st congressional district election
Party	Candidate	Votes	%
Democratic	Alan Mollohan	100,939	64.3
Republican	Chris Wakim	55,963	35.6
Write-In	Bennie Kyle	29	0.0
Write-In	David Moran	69	0.0

2004 West Virginia's 1st congressional district election
Party	Candidate	Votes	%
Democratic	Alan Mollohan	166,583	67.8
Republican	Alan Parks	79,196	32.2

2002 West Virginia's 1st congressional district election
Party	Candidate	Votes	%
Democratic	Alan Mollohan	110,941	99.7
Write-In	Louis Davis	320	0.3

2000 West Virginia's 1st congressional district election
Party	Candidate	Votes	%
Democratic	Alan Mollohan	170,974	87.8
Libertarian	Richard Kerr	23,797	12.2

U.S. House of Representatives
Preceded by Bob Mollohan	Member of the U.S. House of Representatives from West Virginia's 1st congressional district 1983–2011	Succeeded by David McKinley
Preceded by Howard Berman	Ranking Member of the House Ethics Committee; 2003–2006	Succeeded by Howard Berman
U.S. order of precedence (ceremonial)
Preceded by Earl Blumenauer as Former U.S. Representative	Order of precedence of the United States as Former U.S. Representative	Succeeded by Paul E. Kanjorski as Former U.S. Representative
