= 2022 United States House of Representatives elections in West Virginia =

- November 8, 2022

Both West Virginia seats to the United States House of Representatives
	Majority party	Minority party
Party	Republican	Democratic
Last election	3	0
Seats won	2	0
Seat change	▼1	Steady
Popular vote	312,004	149,706
Percentage	66.11%	31.72%
Swing	▼1.45%	▼0.72%

Republican
50–60%
60–70%
70–80%
80–90%
Democratic
50–60%

The 2022 United States House of Representatives elections in West Virginia were held on November 8, 2022, to elect the two U.S. representatives from the State of West Virginia, one from each of the state's two congressional districts. The elections coincided with other elections to the House of Representatives, elections to the United States Senate, and various state and local elections.

District boundaries were redrawn to ensure that the districts are apportioned based on data from the 2020 census, which eliminated a congressional district in West Virginia's delegation.

== Overview ==
District	Republican		Democratic		Independent		Total		Result
District	Votes	%	Votes	%	Votes	%	Total		Result
District 1	151,511	66.69%	65,428	28.80%	10,257	4.51%	227,196	100.0%	Republican hold
District 2	160,493	65.57%	84,278	34.43%	0	0%	244,771	100.0%	Republican hold
Total	312,004	66.11%	149,706	31.72%	10,257	2.17%	471,967	100.0%	

Popular vote
Republican	66.11%
Democratic	31.72%
Independent	2.17%

House seats
Republican	100.00%

== District 1 ==
2022 West Virginia's 1st congressional district election
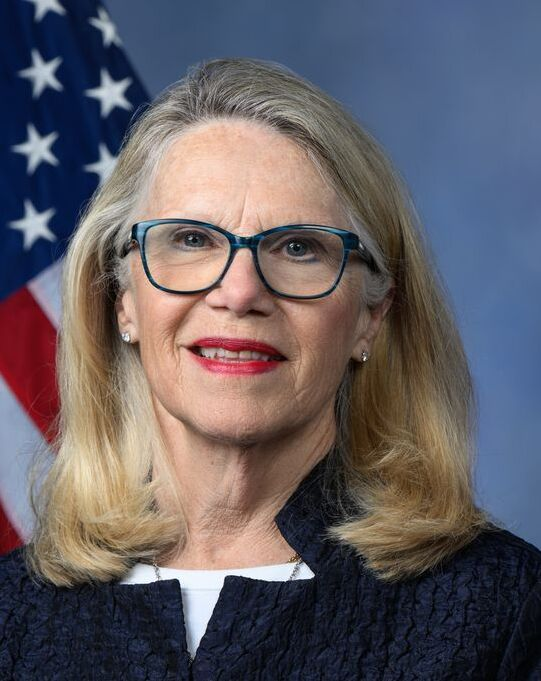

Nominee	Carol Miller	Lacy Watson
Party	Republican	Democratic
Popular vote	151,511	65,428
Percentage	66.7%	28.8%
- Miller: 50–60% 60–70% 70–80%
U.S. Representative before election
Carol Miller
Republican
Elected U.S. Representative
Carol Miller
Republican

The 1st district encompasses Southern West Virginia, taking in Huntington, Charleston, Bluefield, Princeton and Beckley. The incumbent was Republican Carol Miller, who was re-elected in the 3rd district with 71.3% of the vote in 2020.

=== Republican primary ===
==== Candidates ====
===== Nominee =====
- Carol Miller, incumbent U.S. Representative (2019–present)

===== Eliminated in primary =====
- Scott Fuller
- James Houser
- Zane Lawhorn, candidate for state delegate in 2018 and Libertarian nominee for the 3rd district in 2016
- Kent Stevens, businessman

==== Endorsements ====
Carol Miller

Organizations

- Maggie's List

==== Results ====
Republican primary results
Party	Candidate	Votes	%
Republican	Carol Miller (incumbent)	41,852	66.3
Republican	Scott Fuller	6,197	9.8
Republican	Zane Lawhorn	5,530	8.8
Republican	James Houser	4,877	7.7
Republican	Kent Stevens	4,658	7.4
Total votes		63,114	100.0

=== Democratic primary ===
==== Candidates ====
===== Nominee =====
- Lacy Watson, candidate for West Virginia's 3rd congressional district in 2020

==== Results ====
Democratic primary results
Party	Candidate	Votes	%
Democratic	Lacy Watson	32,686	100.0
Total votes		32,686	100.0

=== General election ===
==== Predictions ====
Source	Ranking	As of
The Cook Political Report	Solid R	February 8, 2022
Inside Elections	Solid R	February 11, 2022
Sabato's Crystal Ball	Safe R	February 8, 2022
Politico	Solid R	April 5, 2022
RCP	Safe R	June 9, 2022
Fox News	Solid R	July 11, 2022
DDHQ	Solid R	July 20, 2022
538	Solid R	June 30, 2022

==== Results ====
2022 West Virginia's 1st congressional district election
Party	Candidate	Votes	%
Republican	Carol Miller (incumbent)	151,511	66.7
Democratic	Lacy Watson	65,428	28.8
Independent	Belinda Fox-Spencer	10,257	4.5
Total votes		227,196	100.0
Republican hold			

==== By county ====
County	Carol Miller Republican		Lacy Watson Democratic		Belinda Fox-Spencer Independent		Margin		Total
County	#	%	#	%	#	%	#	%	Total
Boone	3,741	70.99%	1,343	25.48%	186	3.53%	2,398	45.50%	5,270
Braxton	2,295	69.95%	842	25.66%	144	4.39%	1,453	44.29%	3,281
Cabell	13,283	60.23%	8,149	36.95%	620	2.81%	5,134	23.28%	22,052
Calhoun	1,469	71.45%	429	20.87%	158	7.68%	1,040	50.58%	2,056
Clay	1,561	74.69%	431	20.62%	98	4.69%	1,130	54.07%	2,090
Fayette	6,106	63.20%	3,134	32.44%	422	4.37%	2,972	30.76%	9,662
Gilmer	1,125	69.19%	417	25.65%	84	5.17%	708	43.54%	1,626
Greenbrier	7,088	65.18%	2,844	26.15%	943	8.67%	4,244	39.03%	10,875
Jackson	5,975	73.70%	1,744	21.51%	388	4.79%	4,231	52.19%	8,107
Kanawha	26,442	55.61%	19,452	40.91%	1,657	3.48%	6,990	14.70%	47,551
Lincoln	3,502	72.81%	1,125	23.39%	183	3.80%	2,377	49.42%	4,810
Logan	4,695	76.37%	1,278	20.79%	175	2.85%	3,417	55.58%	6,148
Mason	4,699	73.91%	1,399	22.00%	260	4.09%	3,300	51.90%	6,358
McDowell	1,953	62.66%	1,008	32.34%	156	5.00%	945	30.32%	3,117
Mercer	9,662	69.21%	3,496	25.04%	803	5.75%	6,166	44.17%	13,961
Mingo	4,323	79.20%	1,005	18.41%	130	2.38%	3,318	60.79%	5,458
Monroe	2,896	67.57%	799	18.64%	591	13.79%	2,097	48.93%	4,286
Nicholas	4,743	74.35%	1,385	21.71%	251	3.93%	3,358	52.64%	6,379
Pendleton	1,626	74.79%	461	21.21%	87	4.00%	1,165	53.59%	2,174
Pocahontas	1,893	69.32%	674	24.68%	164	6.01%	1,219	44.64%	2,731
Putnam	11,557	70.53%	4,248	25.92%	582	3.55%	7,309	44.60%	16,387
Raleigh	13,495	72.61%	4,221	22.71%	869	4.68%	9,274	49.90%	18,585
Roane	2,479	68.61%	879	24.33%	255	7.06%	1,600	44.28%	3,613
Summers	2,246	65.63%	877	25.63%	299	8.74%	1,369	40.01%	3,422
Wayne	6,935	72.82%	2,316	24.32%	273	2.87%	4,619	48.50%	9,524
Webster	1,385	74.95%	396	21.43%	67	3.63%	989	53.52%	1,848
Wirt	1,304	77.39%	272	16.14%	109	6.47%	1,032	61.25%	1,685
Wyoming	3,033	73.26%	804	19.42%	303	7.32%	2,229	53.84%	4,140
Totals	151,511	66.69%	65,428	28.80%	10,257	4.51%	86,083	37.89%	227,196

== District 2 ==
2022 West Virginia's 2nd congressional district election
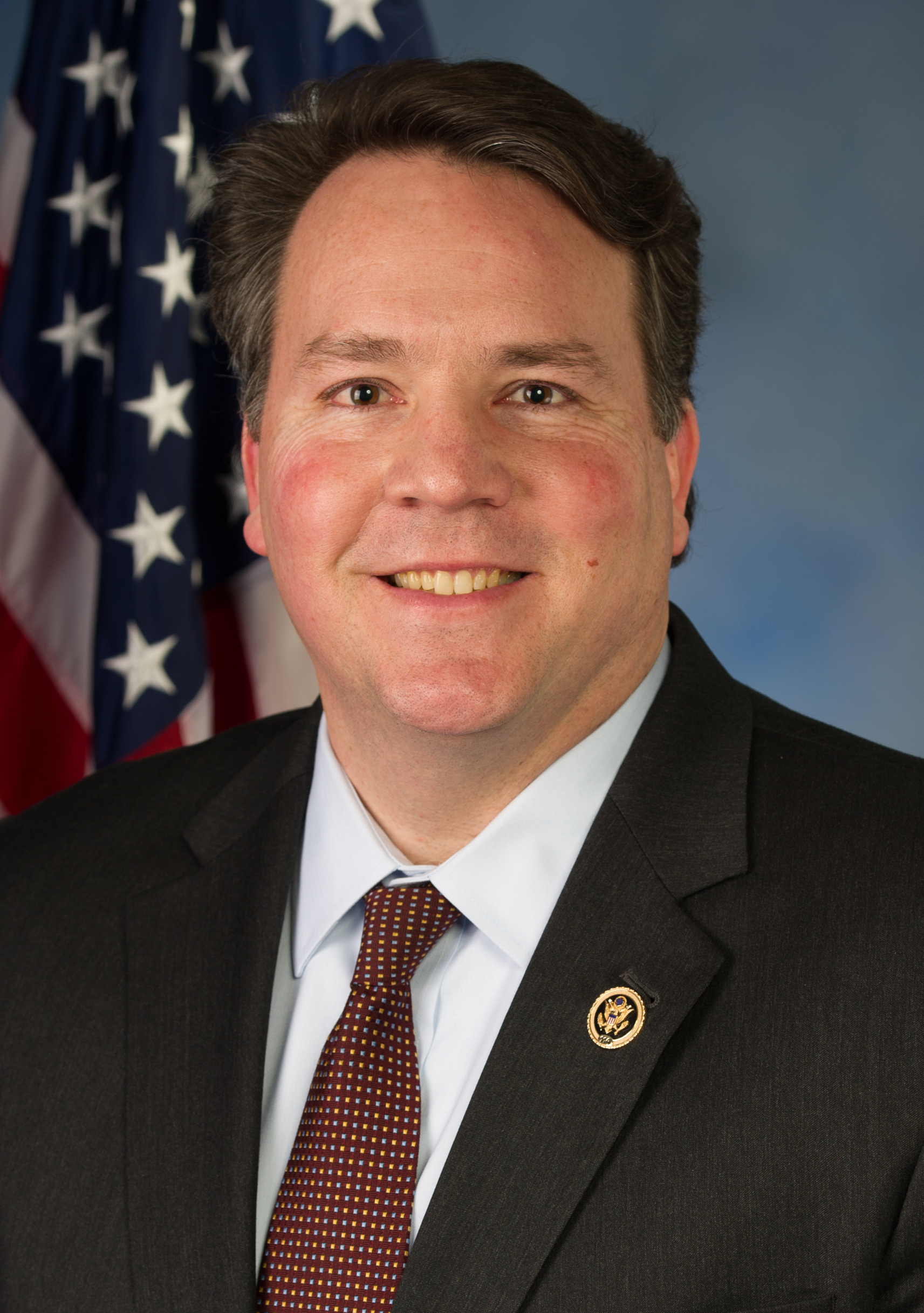

Nominee	Alex Mooney	Barry Lee Wendell
Party	Republican	Democratic
Popular vote	160,493	84,278
Percentage	65.6%	34.4%
- Mooney: 50–60% 60–70% 70–80% 80–90% Wendell: 50–60%
U.S. Representatives before election
David McKinley
Republican
Alex Mooney
Republican
Elected U.S. Representative
Alex Mooney
Republican

The 2nd district encompasses the industrial areas of the northern Panhandle including Wheeling, Fairmont, Clarksburg, Morgantown and Parkersburg, as well as the eastern Panhandle. The incumbents from the district's two predecessor districts are Republican David McKinley (who was re-elected in the 1st district with 69.0% of the vote in 2020) and Republican Alex Mooney (who was re-elected in the 2nd district with 63.1% of the vote in 2020).

=== Republican primary ===
==== Candidates ====
===== Nominee =====
- Alex Mooney, incumbent U.S. Representative (2015–present)

===== Eliminated in primary =====
- Susan Buchser-Lochocki, artist
- Rhonda Hercules
- David McKinley, incumbent U.S. Representative (2011–present)
- Mike Seckman

===== Withdrawn =====
- Michael Sisco, political consultant (endorsed Mooney)

==== Endorsements ====
Alex Mooney

U.S. executive branch officials

- Donald Trump, 45th president of the United States (2017–2021)

U.S. Representatives

- Ronny Jackson, U.S. Representative for Texas's 13th congressional district (2021–present)

Organizations

- American Conservative Union
- Club for Growth
- FreedomWorks
- House Freedom Fund
David McKinley

Executive branch officials

- Mike Pompeo, United States Secretary of State (2018–2021), Director of the CIA (2017–2018), U.S. Representative for Kansas's 4th congressional district (2011–2017)

U.S. Senators

- Joe Manchin, U.S. Senator from West Virginia (2010–present) and former governor of West Virginia (2005–2010) (Democrat)

Governors

- Jim Justice, Governor of West Virginia (2017–present)

State legislators

- Edwin Bowman, former mayor of Weirton (1987–1995) and former state senator (1995–2010) (Democrat)

Individuals

- Andrew Yang, entrepreneur, founder of Venture for America, Democratic candidate for President of the United States in 2020 and for Mayor of New York City in 2021 (Independent, Forward Party)

Organizations

- Citizens for Responsible Energy Solutions
- Gas and Oil Association of West Virginia
- West Virginia Business & Industry Council
- West Virginia Chamber of Commerce
- West Virginia Manufacturing Association

Newspapers

- The Intelligencer and Wheeling News Register
- The Preston County News & Journal

==== Polling ====
Graphical summary

Poll source	Date(s) administered	Sample size (Note: Key: A – all adults RV – registered voters LV – likely voters V – unclear)	Margin of error	David McKinley	Alex Mooney	Other	Undecided
Research America Inc.	April 27 – May 4, 2022	350 (LV)	± 5.2%	33%	48%	6% (Note: Seckman with 3%, Hercules with 2%, Buchser-Lochoski with 1%)	13%
Public Opinion Strategies (R) (Note: Poll sponsored by Mooney's campaign)	April 26–28, 2022	400 (LV)	± 4.9%	30%	50%	–	–
Public Opinion Strategies (R)	April 3–5, 2022	400 (LV)	± 4.9%	31%	42%	–	–
North Star Opinion Research (R) (Note: This poll was sponsored by the West Virginia Chamber of Commerce, which supports McKinley)	March 13–15, 2022	400 (LV)	± 4.9%	38%	33%	4%	25%
North Star Opinion Research (R)	March 13–15, 2022	400 (LV)	± 4.9%	46%	39%	–	15%
WPA Intelligence (R) (Note: This poll was sponsored by Club for Growth Action which endorsed Mooney's campaign prior to its sampling period)	February 2–3, 2022	406 (LV)	± 4.9%	28%	43%	2% (Note: Hercules and Seckman with 1%, Buchser-Lochoski with 0%)	27%
Public Opinion Strategies (R)	January 4–6, 2022	400 (LV)	± 4.9%	32%	45%	10%	13%
Meeting Street Insights (R) (Note: Poll sponsored by McKinley's campaign)	December 13–15, 2021	400 (LV)	± 4.9%	40%	34%	5%	21%
Public Opinion Strategies (R)	November 2021	400 (LV)	± 4.9%	42%	39%	–	19%
National Research Inc. (R) (Note: This poll was sponsored by GOPAC)	October 23–26, 2021	400 (LV)	± 4.9%	44%	29%	9%	18%

==== Results ====
Results by county: Mooney: 30–40%; 40–50%; 50–60%; 60–70%; 70–80%; McKinley: 40–50%; 50–60%; 60–70%

Republican primary results
Party	Candidate	Votes	%
Republican	Alex Mooney (incumbent)	45,164	54.2
Republican	David McKinley (incumbent)	29,619	35.6
Republican	Susan Buchser-Lochocki	3,329	4.0
Republican	Mike Seckman	3,076	3.7
Republican	Rhonda Hercules	2,083	2.5
Total votes		83,271	100.0

=== Democratic primary ===
==== Candidates ====
===== Nominee =====
- Barry Lee Wendell, former Morgantown city councilor

===== Eliminated in primary =====
- Angela Dwyer

==== Results ====
Primary results by county: Wendell: 50–60%; 60–70%; 70–80%; 80–90%; Dwyer: 50–60%; 70–80%; 80–90%; >90%

Democratic primary results
Party	Candidate	Votes	%
Democratic	Barry Lee Wendell	22,139	57.1
Democratic	Angela Dwyer	16,653	42.9
Total votes		38,792	100.0

=== General election ===
==== Predictions ====
Source	Ranking	As of
The Cook Political Report	Solid R	February 8, 2022
Inside Elections	Solid R	February 11, 2022
Sabato's Crystal Ball	Safe R	February 8, 2022
Politico	Solid R	April 5, 2022
RCP	Safe R	June 9, 2022
Fox News	Solid R	July 11, 2022
DDHQ	Solid R	July 20, 2022
538	Solid R	June 30, 2022

==== Results ====
2022 West Virginia's 2nd congressional district election
Party	Candidate	Votes	%
Republican	Alex Mooney (incumbent)	160,493	65.5
Democratic	Barry Lee Wendell	84,278	34.4
Republican	Susan Buchser-Lochocki (write-in)	115	0.0
Total votes		244,886	100.0
Republican hold			

==== By county ====
County	Alex Mooney Republican		Barry Lee Wendell Democratic		Susan Buchser-Lochocki Republican (write-in)		Margin		Total
County	#	%	#	%	#	%	#	%	Total
Barbour	2,772	71.91%	1,082	28.07%	1	0.03%	1,690	43.84%	3,855
Berkeley	20,653	69.99%	8,852	30.00%	2	0.01%	11,801	39.99%	29,507
Brooke	4,109	65.47%	2,154	34.32%	13	0.21%	1,955	31.15%	6,276
Doddridge	1,584	79.96%	397	20.04%	0	0.00%	1,187	59.92%	1,981
Grant	3,035	87.56%	431	12.44%	0	0.00%	2,604	75.13%	3,466
Hampshire	5,046	81.15%	1,170	18.82%	2	0.03%	3,876	62.34%	6,218
Hancock	5,785	69.65%	2,521	30.35%	0	0.00%	3,264	39.30%	8,306
Hardy	3,071	77.77%	877	22.21%	1	0.03%	2,194	55.56%	3,949
Harrison	11,149	62.14%	6,792	37.86%	0	0.00%	4,357	24.29%	17,941
Jefferson	10,664	58.63%	7,526	41.37%	0	0.00%	3,138	17.25%	18,190
Lewis	3,265	74.12%	1,139	25.86%	1	0.02%	2,126	48.26%	4,405
Marion	8,791	56.44%	6,783	43.54%	3	0.02%	2,008	12.89%	15,577
Marshall	5,932	66.46%	2,994	33.54%	0	0.00%	2,938	32.92%	8,926
Mineral	6,234	78.65%	1,691	21.33%	1	0.01%	4,543	57.32%	7,926
Monongalia	11,827	45.42%	14,138	54.29%	76	0.29%	-2,311	-8.87%	26,041
Morgan	3,949	76.84%	1,180	22.96%	10	0.19%	2,769	53.88%	5,139
Ohio	7,415	59.62%	5,022	40.38%	0	0.00%	2,393	19.24%	12,437
Pleasants	1,652	74.95%	552	25.05%	0	0.00%	1,100	49.91%	2,204
Preston	6,246	70.72%	2,585	29.27%	1	0.01%	3,661	41.45%	8,832
Randolph	4,910	65.28%	2,612	34.72%	0	0.00%	2,298	30.55%	7,522
Ritchie	2,061	82.05%	451	17.95%	0	0.00%	1,610	64.09%	2,512
Taylor	2,969	68.17%	1,385	31.80%	1	0.02%	1,584	36.37%	4,355
Tucker	1,680	65.40%	889	34.60%	0	0.00%	791	30.79%	2,569
Tyler	1,838	77.06%	547	22.94%	0	0.00%	1,291	54.13%	2,385
Upshur	4,486	73.72%	1,597	26.24%	2	0.03%	2,889	47.48%	6,085
Wetzel	2,572	65.75%	1,340	34.25%	0	0.00%	1,232	31.49%	3,912
Wood	16,798	68.93%	7,571	31.07%	1	0.00%	9,227	37.86%	24,370
Totals	160,493	65.54%	84,278	34.42%	115	0.05%	76,215	31.12%	244,886

== Notes ==
Partisan clients
