= Better Buildings Act of 2014 =

American federal law

- Long title: To facilitate better alignment, cooperation, and best practices between commercial real estate landlords and tenants regarding energy efficiency in buildings, and for other purposes.
- Announced in: the 113th United States Congress
- Sponsored by: Rep. David B. McKinley (R, WV-1)
- Number of co-sponsors: 1

Codification
- Acts affected: Energy Independence and Security Act of 2007, Energy Policy and Conservation Act
- U.S.C. sections affected: 42 U.S.C. § 17081 et seq.
- Agencies affected: Assistant Secretary for Energy Efficiency and Renewable Energy, Energy Information Administration, General Services Administration, United States Environmental Protection Agency, United States Department of Energy

Legislative history
- Introduced in the House as H.R. 2126 by Rep. David B. McKinley (R, WV-1) on May 23, 2013; Committee consideration by United States House Committee on Energy and Commerce, United States House Energy Subcommittee on Energy and Power

The Better Buildings Act of 2014 (H.R. 2126) is a bill that would amend federal law aimed at improving the energy efficiency of commercial office buildings. The bill would also create a program called "Tenant Star" similar to the existing ENERGY STAR program. The program would be a voluntary one. The bill would also require the General Services Administration to work with the United States Department of Energy to develop guidelines and models that would help landlords and their tenants work together to improve the energy efficiency of their buildings.

The bill was introduced into the United States House of Representatives during the 113th United States Congress.

== Provisions of the bill ==
This summary is based largely on the summary provided by the Congressional Research Service, a public domain source.

The Better Buildings Act of 2013 would require the Administrator of General Services (GSA) to develop and publish model leasing provisions for use in leasing documents that designate a federal agency as a landlord or tenant to encourage building owners and tenants to invest in cost-effective energy efficiency measures.

The bill would require the Administrator to: (1) develop policies and best practices to implement such measures for the realty services provided by the Administrator to federal agencies, including periodic training of federal employees and contractors on how to identify and evaluate such measures; and (2) make available such model leasing provisions and best practices to state, county, and municipal governments that manage owned and leased building space to encourage investment in such energy efficiency measures.

The bill would amend the Energy Independence and Security Act of 2007 to require the United States Department of Energy's (DOE) Assistant Secretary for Energy Efficiency and Renewable Energy to study the feasibility of: (1) significantly improving energy efficiency in commercial buildings through the design and construction of separate spaces with high-performance energy efficiency measures, and (2) encouraging owners and tenants to implement such measures in separate spaces. Requires the Secretary to publish such study on DOE's website.

The bill would require the Administrator of the Environmental Protection Agency (EPA) to develop a voluntary Tenant Star program within the ENERGY STAR program to recognize tenants in commercial buildings that voluntarily achieve high levels of energy efficiency in separate spaces. Requires DOE's Administrator of the Energy Information Administration to collect data on categories of building occupancy that consume significant quantities of energy and on other aspects of the property, building operation, or building occupancy determined to be relevant to lowering energy consumption. Prohibits the impact on climate change from being a factor in determining energy efficiency of commercial building tenants.

== Congressional Budget Office report ==
This summary is based largely on the summary provided by the Congressional Budget Office, as ordered reported by the House Committee on Energy and Commerce on January 28, 2014. This is a public domain source.

H.R. 2126 would amend federal law aimed at improving the energy efficiency of commercial office buildings. The legislation would require the General Services Administration (GSA) to develop model leasing provisions to encourage energy efficiency in privately owned buildings with federal tenants. The bill also would establish a program similar to the Environmental Protection Agency’s ENERGY STAR program to promote energy efficiency in buildings leased to the federal government. Finally, the bill would require the United States Department of Energy (DOE) to prepare a report to the Congress on energy efficiency in commercial buildings.

Since the 1970s, many laws and policies have been enacted to reduce energy consumption. According to the GSA, most of the provisions of the bill are broadly consistent with existing law and practices. As a result, Congressional Budget Office (CBO) does not expect that enacting H.R. 2126 would significantly affect agencies’ administrative costs or result in significant additional investments by the federal government in energy savings initiatives. Optimizing the use of energy conservation measures in buildings leased by the government could eventually reduce federal spending by lowering occupancy costs, but CBO does not expect agencies would realize any significant savings from such efforts during the next few years. Enacting the bill would not affect direct spending or revenues; therefore, pay-as-you-go procedures do not apply.

H.R. 2126 contains no intergovernmental or private-sector mandates as defined in the Unfunded Mandates Reform Act and would impose no costs on state, local, or tribal governments.

== Procedural history ==
The Better Buildings Act of 2013 was introduced into the United States House of Representatives on May 23, 2013 by Rep. David B. McKinley (R, WV-1). It was referred to the United States House Committee on Energy and Commerce and the United States House Energy Subcommittee on Energy and Power. It was reported (amended) alongside House Report 113-371 on February 28, 2014. On February 29, 2014, House Majority Leader Eric Cantor announced that H.R. 2126 would be considered under a suspension of the rules on March 4, 2014.

== Debate and discussion ==
The U.S. Green Building Council was involved in organizing and supporting this bill.

McKinley argued in favor of the bill, saying that "finding ways to use energy efficiently is common sense. We ought to be promoting efficiency as a way to save energy, money and create jobs."

== See also ==
- List of bills in the 113th United States Congress
