= John W. Derr =

American politician (1941–2026)

Member of the Maryland Senate from the 3rd district
- In office 1983 – January 13, 1999
- Preceded by: Edward P. Thomas Jr.
- Succeeded by: Alex Mooney

Personal details
- Born: March 18, 1941 Frederick, Maryland, U.S.
- Died: January 7, 2026 (aged 84) Minnesota, U.S.
- Party: Republican

John Witt Derr (March 18, 1941 – January 7, 2026) was an American politician who was a member of the Maryland Senate representing District 3 from 1983 to 1999.

== Background ==
Derr was appointed to the Maryland Senate to represent District 3 in 1983, which covers parts of Frederick and Washington Counties, following the death of incumbent state senator Edward P. Thomas Jr. In 1986, Derr was elected to a full term, defeating Democratic challenger Gerald Downs in the general election with 68 percent of the vote.

In 1990, Senator Derr was not challenged and received 100% of the vote. In the 1994 primary election, Derr received more competition, this time from Republican Charles R. Luttrell. Luttrell managed to garner 47% of the vote. Derr went on to win the general election, this time, oddly enough, beating the same candidate, Charles R. Luttrell, who apparently switched parties to challenge Derr again.

In 1998, Derr saw the end of his senatorial career. He was defeated by Republican challenger Alex X. Mooney in the Republican primary election. Mooney received a sizable majority of the votes, 63% to Derr's 37%. Mooney went on to win the general election, defeating the Democrat Ronald S. Bird.

== Education ==
Derr attended Frederick High School in Frederick, Maryland. After high school, he received his B.S. from the University of Maryland in 1963. To become a chartered life underwriter (C.L.U.), Derr graduated from The American College in 1977.

== Career ==
Prior to his political career, Derr served in U.S. Army Reserves from 1963 until 1969. He then started his career as an insurance agent. In 1982, Derr's political career began to take shape when he became a member of the Republican Local Central Committee. Derr was selected as a delegate to the Republican Party National Convention in 1996.

Derr was a president of the Frederick Jaycees, and was named Jaycee International Senator in 1977. He was also a president of the Frederick County Heart Association. Derr belonged to the Frederick Life Underwriters Association and was a member of the board of trustees for Frederick Memorial Hospital.

While serving in the Maryland State Senate, Derr rose to the level of the Minority Whip from 1996 until he was defeated in 1999. He was the Senate Chair for the Joint Committee on Protocol and he was the chair of the Frederick County Delegation from 1995 until 1999.

An article in the Washington Post suspected that Derr was defeated because of his view on abortion rights. F. Vernon Boozer suffered the same fate with his views on abortion and gun control in his loss to Andrew Harris.

== Death ==
After a long struggle with multiple forms of cancer, Derr died in the Minneapolis Hospital on January 7, 2026. He was 84.
