= 2020 United States House of Representatives elections in West Virginia =

- November 3, 2020

All 3 West Virginia seats to the United States House of Representatives
	Majority party	Minority party
Party	Republican	Democratic
Last election	3	0
Seats won	3	0
Seat change	Steady	Steady
Popular vote	514,268	246,903
Percentage	67.56%	32.44%
Swing	▲9.23%	▼8.14%
- Republican 50–60% 60–70% 70–80% 80–90%

The 2020 United States House of Representatives elections in West Virginia were held on November 3, 2020, to elect the three U.S. representatives from the state of West Virginia, one from each of the state's three congressional districts. The elections coincided with the 2020 U.S. presidential election, as well as other elections to the House of Representatives, elections to the United States Senate and various state and local elections.

Republicans held all of their seats in the West Virginia delegation with increased margins from 2018.

== Overview ==
District	Republican		Democratic		Total		Result
District	Votes	%	Votes	%	Votes	%	Result
District 1	180,488	68.98%	81,177	31.02%	261,665	100.0%	Republican hold
District 2	172,195	63.08%	100,799	36.92%	272,994	100.0%	Republican hold
District 3	161,585	71.34%	64,927	28.66%	226,512	100.0%	Republican hold
Total	514,268	67.56%	246,903	32.44%	761,171	100.0%	

Popular vote
Republican	67.56%
Democratic	32.44%

House seats
Republican	100.00%

== District 1 ==
2020 West Virginia's 1st congressional district election
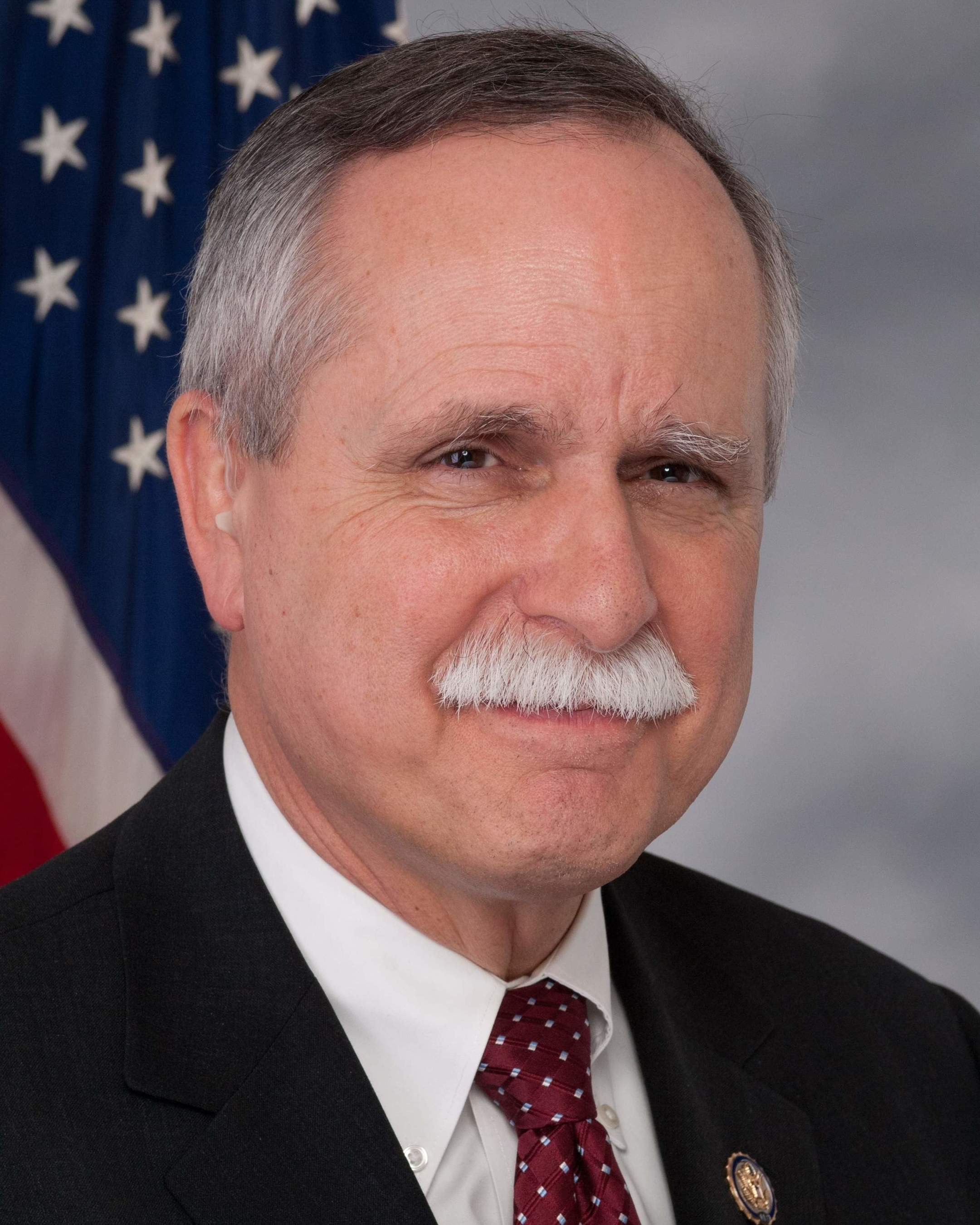

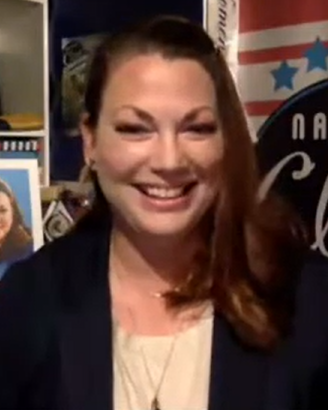
Nominee	David McKinley	Natalie Cline
Party	Republican	Democratic
Popular vote	180,488	81,177
Percentage	69.0%	31.0%
- McKinley: 50–60% 60–70% 70–80% 80–90% More Democratic 10-15% 5-10% <5% More Republican 15-20% 10-15% 5-10% <5% More Democratic 10-15% 5-10% <5% More Republican 15-20% 10-15% 5-10% <5%
U.S. Representative before election
David McKinley
Republican
Elected U.S. Representative
David McKinley
Republican

The 1st district encompasses the industrial areas of the northern Panhandle including Wheeling, Fairmont, Clarksburg, Morgantown, and Parkersburg. The incumbent was Republican David McKinley, who was re-elected with 64.6% of the vote in 2018.

=== Republican primary ===
==== Candidates ====
===== Declared =====
- David McKinley, incumbent U.S. Representative

==== Primary results ====
Republican primary results
Party	Candidate	Votes	%
Republican	David McKinley (incumbent)	64,789	100.0
Total votes		64,789	100.0

=== Democratic primary ===
==== Candidates ====
===== Declared =====
- Natalie Cline, computational linguist
- Tom Payne, candidate for this seat in 2018

==== Endorsements ====
Natalie Cline

Organizations

- DUH! Demand Universal Healthcare
- LEAP Forward

Parties

- Working Families Party - West Virginia

==== Primary results ====
Democratic primary results
Party	Candidate	Votes	%
Democratic	Natalie Cline	46,052	74.7
Democratic	Tom Payne	15,559	25.3
Total votes		61,611	100.0

=== General election ===
==== Predictions ====
Source	Ranking	As of
The Cook Political Report	Safe R	November 2, 2020
Inside Elections	Safe R	October 28, 2020
Sabato's Crystal Ball	Safe R	November 2, 2020
Politico	Safe R	November 2, 2020
Daily Kos	Safe R	November 2, 2020
RCP	Safe R	November 2, 2020

==== Post-primary endorsements ====
Natalie Cline

Organizations

- AFT-WV
- National Association of Social Workers

==== Results ====
West Virginia's 1st congressional district, 2020
Party	Candidate	Votes	%
Republican	David McKinley (incumbent)	180,488	69.0
Democratic	Natalie Cline	81,177	31.0
Total votes		261,665	100.0
Republican hold			

== District 2 ==
2020 West Virginia's 2nd congressional district election
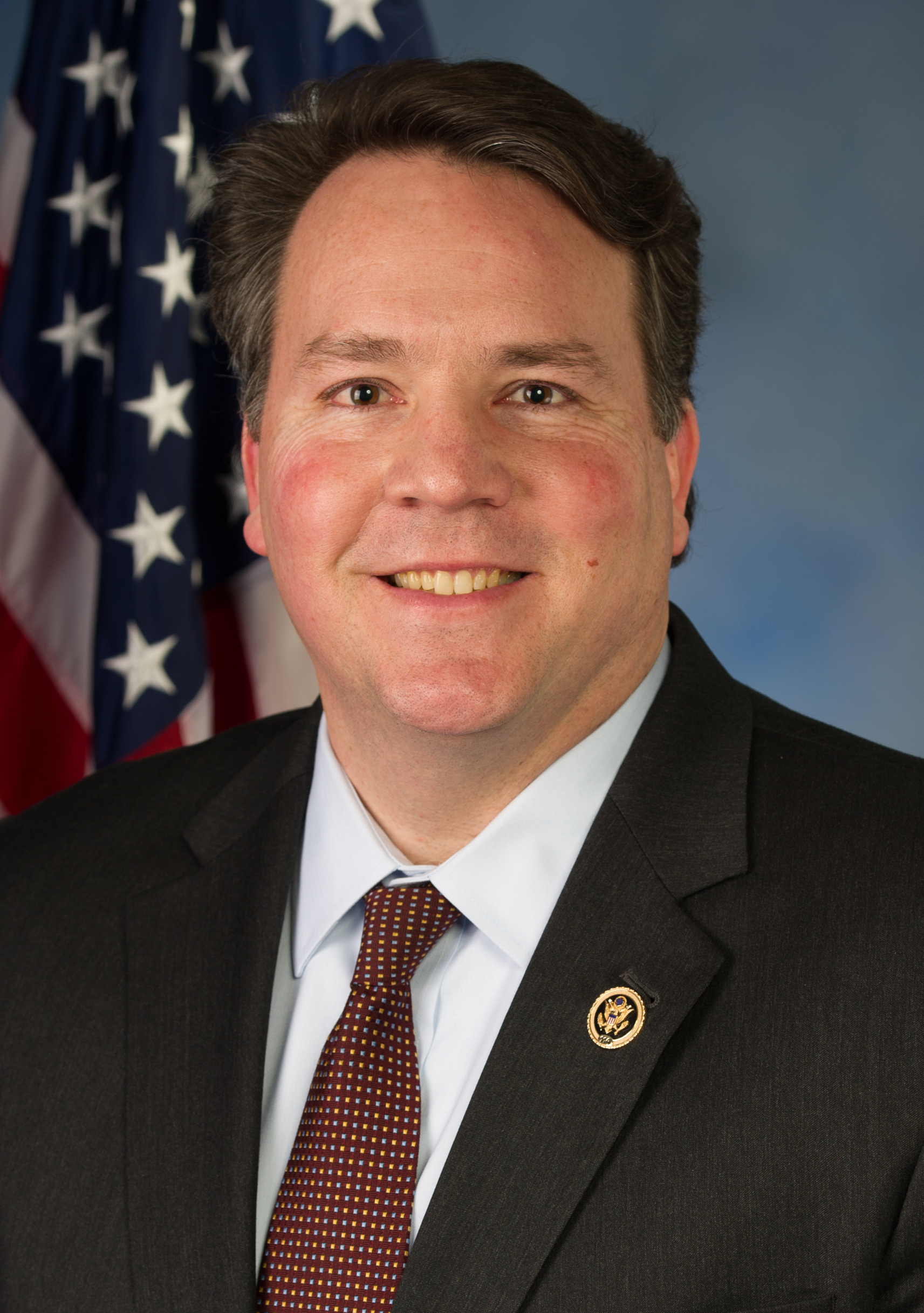

Nominee	Alex Mooney	Cathy Kunkel
Party	Republican	Democratic
Popular vote	172,195	100,799
Percentage	63.1%	36.9%
- Mooney: 50–60% 60–70% 70–80% More Democratic 5-10% <5% More Republican 25-30% 20-25% 15-20% 10-15% 5-10% <5% More Democratic 5-10% <5% More Republican 25-30% 20-25% 15-20% 10-15% 5-10% <5%
U.S. Representative before election
Alex Mooney
Republican
Elected U.S. Representative
Alex Mooney
Republican

The 2nd district is located in the central region of the state, stretching from Charleston into the Eastern Panhandle. The incumbent was Republican Alex Mooney, who was re-elected with 53.9% of the vote in 2018.

=== Republican primary ===
==== Candidates ====
===== Declared =====
- Matt Hahn
- Alex Mooney, incumbent U.S. Representative

==== Primary results ====
Republican primary results
Party	Candidate	Votes	%
Republican	Alex Mooney (incumbent)	51,184	71.7
Republican	Matt Hahn	20,186	28.3
Total votes		71,370	100.0

=== Democratic primary ===
==== Candidates ====
===== Declared =====
- Cathy Kunkel, energy policy analyst

==== Primary results ====
Democratic primary results
Party	Candidate	Votes	%
Democratic	Cathy Kunkel	53,745	100.0
Total votes		53,745	100.0

=== General election ===
==== Predictions ====
Source	Ranking	As of
The Cook Political Report	Safe R	November 2, 2020
Inside Elections	Safe R	October 28, 2020
Sabato's Crystal Ball	Safe R	November 2, 2020
Politico	Likely R	November 2, 2020
Daily Kos	Safe R	November 2, 2020
RCP	Safe R	November 2, 2020

==== Endorsements ====
Cathy Kunkel (D)

United States Senators

- Joe Manchin, U.S. senator from West Virginia
- Bernie Sanders, U.S. senator from Vermont
- Elizabeth Warren, U.S. senator from Massachusetts

Local politicians

- Paula Jean Swearengin, Democratic nominee for 2020 United States Senate election in West Virginia

Notable politicians

- Charles Booker, state representative for Kentucky's 43rd District

Unions

- AFL-CIO - West Virginia
- American Federation of Teachers - West Virginia
- Communications Workers of America
- United Auto Workers
- United Food & Commercial Workers Local 400
- United Steelworkers

Organizations

- Climate Hawks Vote
- DUH! Demand Universal Healthcare
- Friends of Earth
- Indivisible
- National Women's Political Caucus
- Sierra Club
- Sunrise Movement

Parties

- Working Families Party - West Virginia

==== Results ====
West Virginia's 2nd congressional district, 2020
Party	Candidate	Votes	%
Republican	Alex Mooney (incumbent)	172,195	63.1
Democratic	Cathy Kunkel	100,799	36.9
Total votes		272,994	100.0
Republican hold			

== District 3 ==
2020 West Virginia's 3rd congressional district election
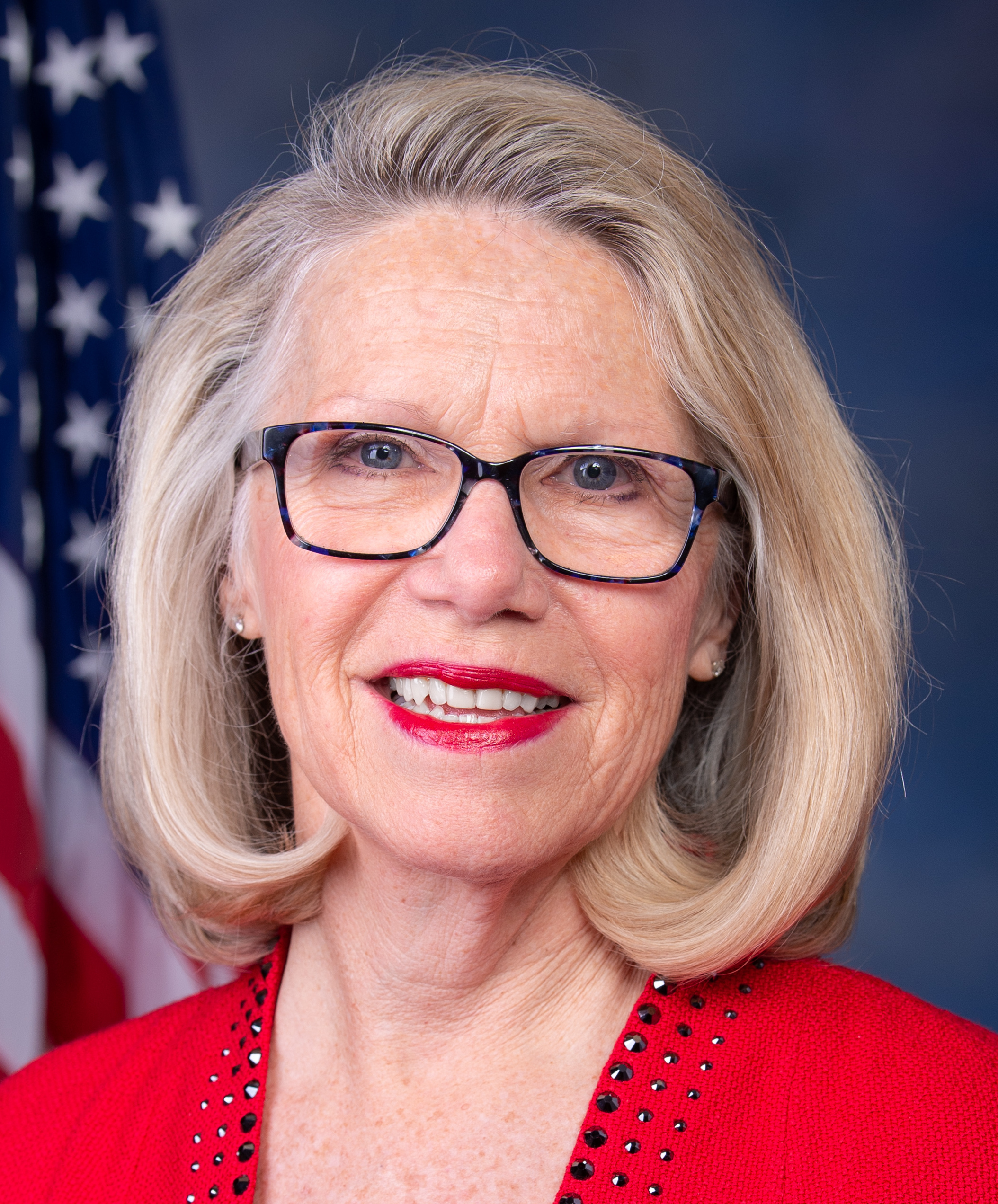

Nominee	Carol Miller	Hilary Turner
Party	Republican	Democratic
Popular vote	161,585	64,927
Percentage	71.3%	28.7%
- Miller: 50–60% 60–70% 70–80% 80–90% More Democratic 10-15% <5% More Republican >30% 25-30% 20-25% 15-20% 10-15% 5-10% <5% More Democratic 10-15% <5% More Republican >30% 25-30% 20-25% 15-20% 10-15% 5-10% <5%
U.S. Representative before election
Carol Miller
Republican
Elected U.S. Representative
Carol Miller
Republican

The 3rd district encompasses southern West Virginia, taking in Huntington, Bluefield, Princeton and Beckley. The incumbent was Republican Carol Miller, who was elected with 56.4% of the vote in 2018.

=== Republican primary ===
==== Candidates ====
===== Declared =====
- Carol Miller, incumbent U.S. Representative
- Russell Siegel

==== Endorsements ====
Carol Miller

Organizations

- Maggie's List

==== Primary results ====
Republican primary results
Party	Candidate	Votes	%
Republican	Carol Miller (incumbent)	40,226	70.3
Republican	Russell Siegel	17,024	29.7
Total votes		57,250	100.0

=== Democratic primary ===
==== Candidates ====
===== Declared =====
- Paul E. Davis
- Jeff Lewis
- Hilary Turner
- Lacy Watson

==== Endorsements ====
Lacy Watson

Organizations

- The Collective PAC
Hilary Turner

Organizations

- Rose Caucus

Parties

- Working Families Party - West Virginia

==== Primary results ====
Democratic primary results
Party	Candidate	Votes	%
Democratic	Hilary Turner	16,862	29.5
Democratic	Lacy Watson	16,760	29.3
Democratic	Paul E. Davis	14,020	24.5
Democratic	Jeff Lewis	9,542	16.7
Total votes		57,184	100.0

=== General election ===
==== Predictions ====
Source	Ranking	As of
The Cook Political Report	Safe R	November 2, 2020
Inside Elections	Safe R	October 28, 2020
Sabato's Crystal Ball	Safe R	November 2, 2020
Politico	Likely R	November 2, 2020
Daily Kos	Safe R	November 2, 2020
RCP	Safe R	November 2, 2020

==== Results ====
West Virginia's 3rd congressional district, 2020
Party	Candidate	Votes	%
Republican	Carol Miller (incumbent)	161,585	71.3
Democratic	Hilary Turner	64,927	28.7
Total votes		226,512	100.0
Republican hold			
