= Alex Mooney =

American politician (born 1971)

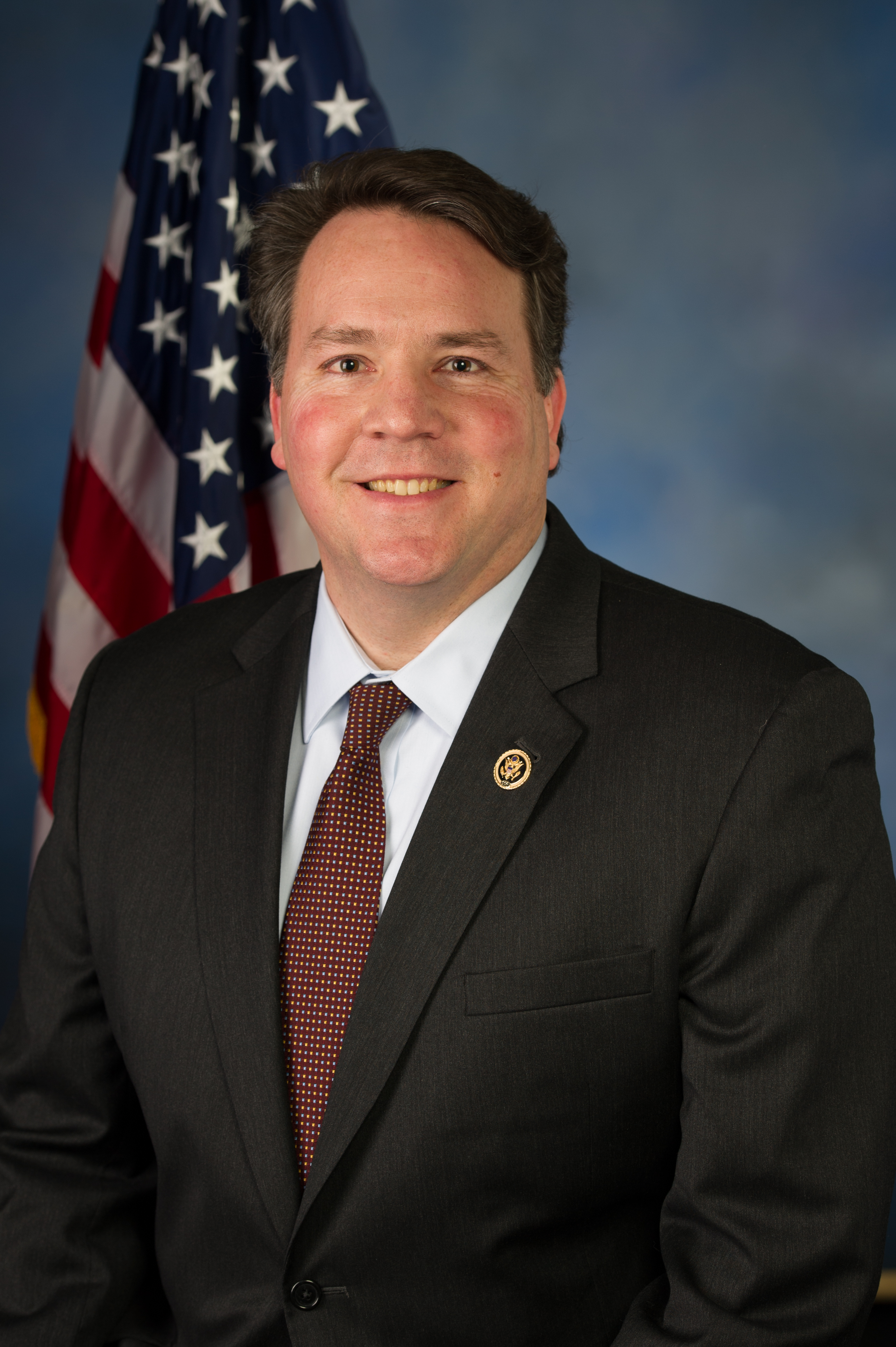
- Official portrait, 2015

Member of the U.S. House of Representatives from West Virginia's 2nd district
- In office January 3, 2015 – January 3, 2025
- Preceded by: Shelley Moore Capito
- Succeeded by: Riley Moore

Chair of the Maryland Republican Party
- In office December 11, 2010 – March 1, 2013
- Preceded by: Audrey Scott
- Succeeded by: Diana Waterman

Member of the Maryland Senate from the 3rd district
- In office January 13, 1999 – January 12, 2011
- Preceded by: John W. Derr
- Succeeded by: Ronald N. Young

Personal details
- Born: Alexander Xavier Mooney; June 7, 1971 (age 55) Washington, D.C., U.S.
- Party: Republican
- Spouse: Grace Mooney
- Children: 3
- Relatives: Xavier Suarez (uncle); Francis Suarez (cousin)
- Education: Dartmouth College (BA)

Alexander Xavier Mooney (born June 7, 1971) is an American lobbyist and former politician who served as the U.S. representative for West Virginia's 2nd congressional district from 2015 to 2025. A member of the Republican Party, he represented the 3rd district in the Maryland State Senate from 1999 to 2011 and is a former chair of the Maryland Republican Party. He is the first Hispanic person elected to Congress from West Virginia.

In November 2022, Mooney filed to run for U.S. Senate in 2024 for the West Virginia seat occupied by outgoing Democrat Joe Manchin. Mooney was defeated in a landslide in the Republican primary by Jim Justice.

== Early life, education, and early career ==
Mooney's mother, Lala, was a Cuban refugee who escaped political imprisonment at age 21, shortly after the Bay of Pigs Invasion. Her older brother is former Miami mayor Xavier Suarez, making Mooney cousin of another former Miami mayor in Francis Suarez. His great-grandparents on his father's side were Irish-born. His father, Vincent, grew up in Long Island, New York. Mooney was born in 1971 in Washington, D.C., and raised in Frederick, Maryland. He graduated from Frederick High School, where he was elected president of the student government.

In 1993, Mooney received his B.A. in philosophy from Dartmouth College. While attending Dartmouth, he ran for the New Hampshire House of Representatives in Grafton County's 10th district. He finished in last place with 8% of the vote. In 2007, Mooney was elected to the Dartmouth College Association of Alumni's executive committee. In early 2008, he traveled to New Hampshire to testify in support of a state bill that would require legislative approval for amendments that the private Board of Trustees of Dartmouth College wished to make to its charter.

After college, Mooney interned for U.S. Representative Ed Royce and then served as staff assistant to U.S. Representative Roscoe Bartlett. In 1995, he became a legislative analyst for the House Republican Conference.

== Maryland Senate ==
From 1999 to 2011, Mooney represented Maryland's 3rd district, which covers parts of Washington and Frederick counties, in the Maryland Senate. He served as the National Journalism Center's executive director from 2005 to 2012.

=== Elections ===
In 1998, Mooney defeated incumbent Republican John W. Derr in the primary election and Democrat Ronald S. Bird in the general election. In 2002, he was reelected, defeating Democrat Sue Hecht with 55% of the vote. In 2006, he won reelection with 52% of the vote against Candy Greenway. In 2010, Democrat Ronald N. Young, Mayor of Frederick, defeated him 51%–49%.

=== Committee assignments ===
In the Maryland State Senate, Mooney was a member of the Judicial Proceedings Committee, the Joint Committee on Investigation, the Joint Committee on Federal Relations, and the Education, Health and Environmental Affairs Committee. He served on the Maryland Rural Caucus, the Taxpayers Protection Caucus, and the Maryland Veterans Caucus.

== Post-Senate career ==
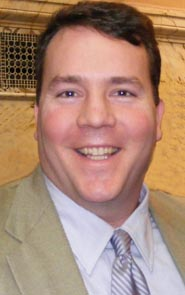
Mooney in 2008

=== Chair of the Maryland GOP ===
On December 11, 2010, Mooney was elected chair of the Maryland Republican Party. He was chair until early 2013.

=== 2012 congressional election ===
Maryland's redistricting based on the 2010 census significantly redrew the boundaries of incumbent Roscoe Bartlett's 6th district. The district lost all of heavily Republican Carroll County, as well as some Republican-leaning parts of Baltimore, Frederick and Harford counties, while gaining a heavily Democratic spur of Montgomery County. In 2008, Barack Obama took 40% of the vote in the old 6th, but would have won 56% in the new 6th. After creating an exploratory committee to challenge Bartlett in the Republican primary, Mooney decided not to run against him.

== U.S. House of Representatives ==
=== Elections ===
==== 2014 ====
In March 2012, Mooney filed as a candidate in the 2014 Republican primary for Maryland's 6th congressional District. He subsequently had to withdraw his candidacy because he was still Bartlett's part-time outreach director at the time he filed to run. House ethics rules do not allow congressional staffers to remain employed in a congressional office while campaigning.

Mooney subsequently moved to Charles Town, West Virginia, a small town on the state's eastern tip, and declared his candidacy for West Virginia's 2nd congressional district. The district includes most of the West Virginia portion of the Washington media market. Seven-term Republican incumbent Shelley Moore Capito was giving up the seat to run for the United States Senate. During his campaign, some West Virginia Democrats accused Mooney of being a carpetbagger since he had recently moved to West Virginia.

Mooney received the Republican nomination on May 13, 2014, beating six other candidates. He finished first in 15 of the 17 counties in the congressional district, with 36.02% of the vote.

Mooney defeated Democrat Nick Casey in the 2014 general election, 47% to 44%. He won Berkeley County, in the state's Eastern Panhandle, by 5,000 votes, which was more than his overall margin of 4,900 votes. Like Charles Town, Berkeley is part of the Washington media market. Mooney was also helped by long coattails from Capito, who carried every county in the state.

Mooney became the first Latino elected to West Virginia's congressional delegation in the state's history.

==== 2016 ====
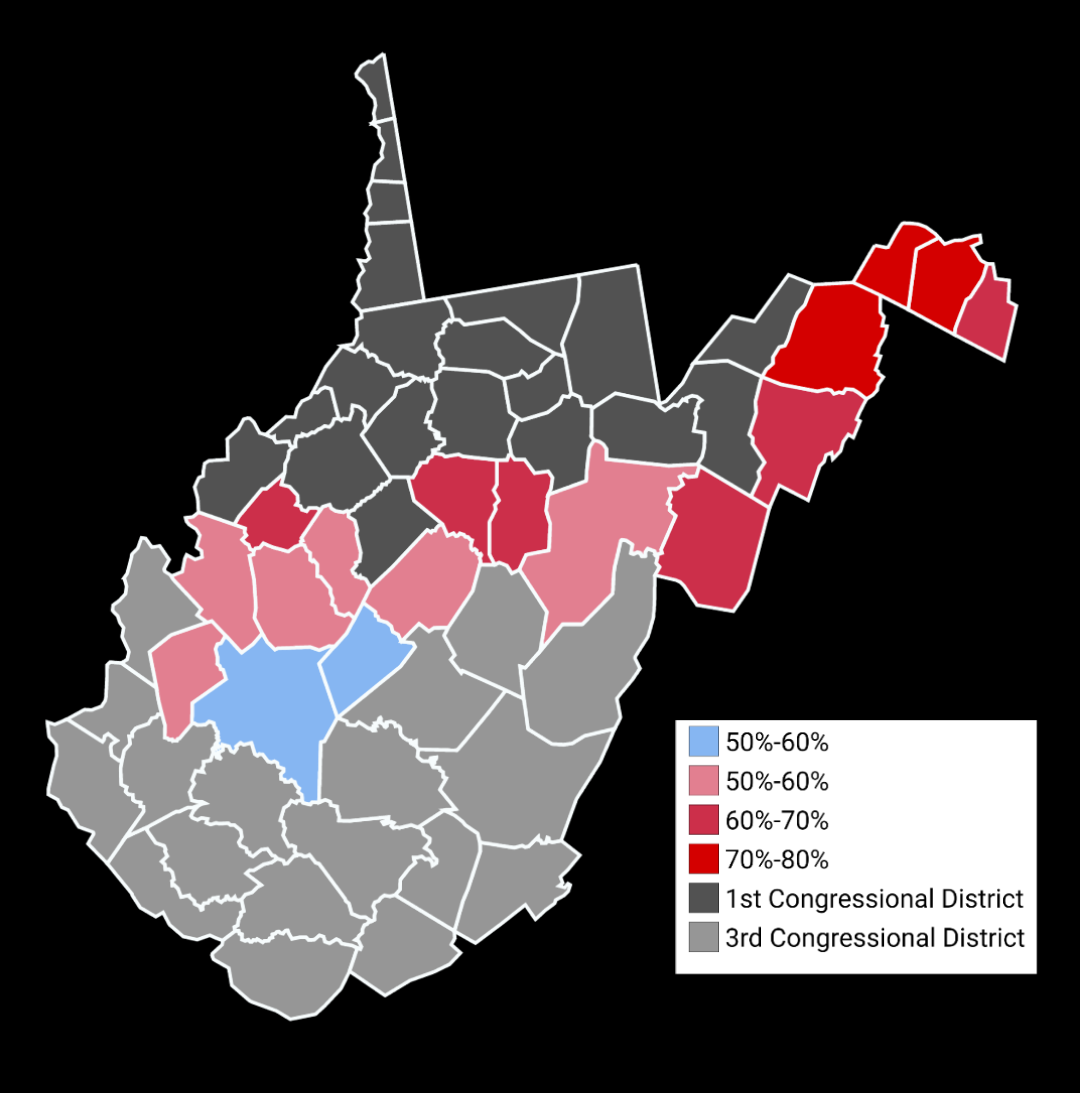
Results by county, 2016

In 2016, Mooney defeated Republican primary challenger Marc Savitt, 72.9%-27.1%. In the general election, Mooney defeated Democratic state delegate Mark Hunt, 58.2%-41.8%.

==== 2018 ====
In 2018, Mooney defeated former U.S. State Department official Talley Sergent, 53.9%-43.0%.

==== 2020 ====
In 2020, Mooney defeated Republican primary challenger Matt Hann, 71.7%-28.3%. In the general election, he defeated energy policy analyst Cathy Kunkel, 63.1%-36.9%.

==== 2022 ====
West Virginia lost a congressional seat as a result of the 2020 United States census. The legislature dismantled Mooney's old district and divided the state into northern and southern districts, and abandoned its longtime practice of starting the numbering in the north. Instead, most of the western portion of the old 2nd, including Charleston, was combined with the bulk of the old 3rd district to form a new 1st district. Meanwhile, most of the eastern portion of the old 2nd, including Mooney's home, was merged with the old 1st district, represented by six-term Republican David McKinley, to form the new 2nd district. Both McKinley and Mooney announced plans to run for reelection. Although the new 2nd was geographically more McKinley's district than Mooney's, Mooney won the Republican primary on May 10, 2022.

=== Tenure ===
Mooney was sworn in on January 3, 2015. On March 26, 2015, he introduced H.R. 1644, the Supporting Transparent Regulatory and Environmental Actions in Mining Act (STREAM Act). The House passed the bill on January 19, 2016, by a vote of 235–188.

==== Ethics investigations ====
In two May 2022 reports, the Office of Congressional Ethics determined that Mooney had "likely violated House rules and federal law" by accepting impermissible gifts and using official resources for personal purposes. The reports found that Mooney and his family had accepted more than $10,800 from a company tied to Mooney on a vacation to Aruba; that Mooney had stayed at a Capitol Hill home owned by the same company's founders for free approximately 20 times from 2015 to 2021, using it for lodging, congressional business, and campaign events; that Mooney had regularly diverted official resources (including staff time) for personal and family matters, and sometimes for campaign activities; and that Mooney had "likely" provided false testimony and withheld evidence in the course of an OCE investigation against him. The OCE transmitted the reports to the House Ethics Committee, which opened an investigation into Mooney's conduct. Mooney denied any misconduct.

=== Committee assignments ===
- United States House Committee on Financial Services

=== Caucus memberships ===
- Freedom Caucus
- Congressional Western Caucus
- Republican Study Committee
- Congressional Caucus on Turkey and Turkish Americans
- Second Amendment Caucus

== 2024 U.S. Senate election ==
On November 15, 2022, Mooney announced his candidacy for the U.S. Senate in 2024, seeking to challenge incumbent Democratic senator Joe Manchin.

In the Republican party primary, Mooney drew support from the right wing faction of the party, notably by influential Senators Ted Cruz, Rand Paul, and Mike Lee, as well as former Freedom Caucus chair Jim Jordan. His main opponent was incumbent governor Jim Justice, who gained support from the establishment wing of the party including endorsements from incumbent Senate minority leader Mitch McConnell and, ultimately, former President Donald Trump. Justice ultimately defeated Mooney, 61.8% to 26.5%.

== Post-legislative career ==
In February 2025, Mooney became a senior advisor to NumbersUSA.

== Political positions ==
=== Gold standard ===
Mooney supports a return to the gold standard.

=== Foreign and military policy ===
Mooney was among 60 Republicans to oppose condemning Trump's action of withdrawing forces from Syria. Along with Matt Gaetz and a handful of Republicans, Mooney broke with his party and voted to end assistance to Saudi Arabia in the War in Yemen.

In 2021, Mooney was one of 14 Republican representatives to vote against a resolution condemning the Myanmar coup d'état. It was unclear why Mooney voted against the measure.

In June 2021, Mooney was one of 49 House Republicans to vote to repeal the 2002 Authorization for Use of Military Force Against Iraq.

In 2023, Mooney was among 47 Republicans to vote in favor of H.Con.Res. 21, which directed President Joe Biden to remove U.S. troops from Syria within 180 days.

=== Marijuana policy ===
Mooney has a "B" rating from NORML for his voting record on cannabis-related matters.

=== Immigration ===
Mooney voted against the Consolidated Appropriations Act (H.R. 1158), which effectively prohibits ICE from cooperating with Health and Human Services to detain or remove illegal alien sponsors of unaccompanied alien children (UACs).

In 2022, NumbersUSA, which seeks to reduce both legal and illegal immigration, gave him a 98% score; in 2019–20, the Federation for American Immigration Reform, which also supports immigration controls, gave him a 100% rating.

=== Attempts to overturn the 2020 presidential election result ===
In December 2020, Mooney was one of 126 Republican members of the House of Representatives to sign an amicus brief in support of Texas v. Pennsylvania, a lawsuit filed at the United States Supreme Court contesting the results of the 2020 presidential election, in which Joe Biden defeated incumbent Donald Trump. The Supreme Court declined to hear the case on the basis that Texas lacked standing under Article III of the Constitution to challenge the results of an election held by another state.

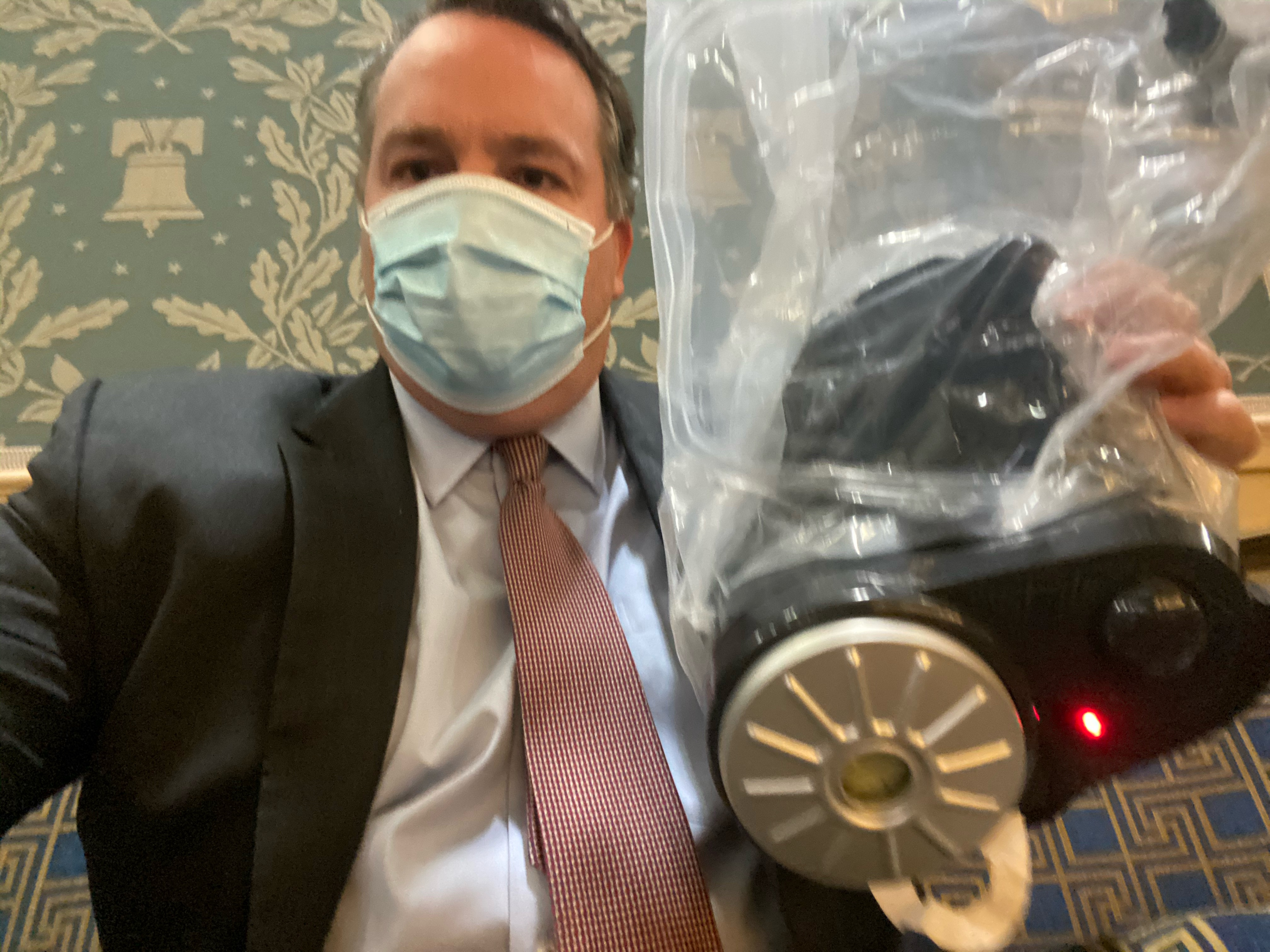
Mooney hiding in the House gallery, while holding a gas mask, during the January 6 United States Capitol attack.

In the days leading up to the 2021 United States Electoral College vote count, he said he had not decided whether he would vote to certify, choosing to decide on the House Floor after listening to debate. Mooney did not support the objection to Arizona's electoral votes, which was sponsored by Senator Ted Cruz. Mooney was in the House Chamber listening to the certification debate when Trump supporters attacked the United States Capitol. He hid in the gallery with other members of Congress before being removed to a safe place.

After the Capitol was secure and Congress returned to certify the results, Mooney supported the objection to certifying Pennsylvania's electoral votes, as sponsored by Senator Josh Hawley. Mooney claimed that Pennsylvania violated election laws, ignored its constitution and that the "legislature was subverted." In response to his decision, the Charleston Gazette-Mail editorial board charged him with "subverting democracy" and said that he and Representative Carol Miller were complicit in the Capitol attack by their unwavering support of Trump.

On January 11, 2021, the Democrats introduced a resolution to call on Vice President Mike Pence to invoke the Twenty-fifth Amendment to the United States Constitution to remove Trump in response to the attack on the Capitol. When the resolution was presented, Mooney objected, saying that Congress "should not adopt a resolution of this magnitude without any debate on the floor of the U.S. House of Representatives. It is wrong to have sent members of Congress home and then try to adopt without any debate a precedent-setting resolution that could imperil our Republic."

=== Fiscal Responsibility Act of 2023 ===
Mooney was among the 71 Republicans who voted against final passage of the Fiscal Responsibility Act of 2023 in the House.

== Electoral history ==
=== West Virginia ===
West Virginia's 2nd congressional district: Results 2014–2022
Year	Republican	Votes	Pct	Democratic	Votes	Pct	Third party	Party	Votes	Pct	Third party	Party	Votes	Pct
2014	Alex Mooney	72,619	47.1%	Nick Casey	67,687	43.9%	Davy Jones	Libertarian	7,682	5.0%	Ed Rabel	Independent	6,250	4.0%
2016	Alex Mooney	140,807	58.2%	Mark Hunt	101,207	41.8%								
2018	Alex Mooney	110,504	53.9%	Talley Sergent	88,011	43.0%	Daniel Lutz	Mountain	6,277	3.1%				
2020	Alex Mooney	172,195	63.1%	Cathy Kunkel	100,799	36.9%								
2022	Alex Mooney	160,493	65.6%	Barry Wendell	84,278	34.4%								

=== Maryland ===
- 2010 race for Maryland State Senate – District 3

Name	Votes	Percent	Outcome
Ronald N. Young, Dem.	22,710	51.1%	Won
Alex X. Mooney, Rep.	21,666	48.7%	Lost
Other Write-Ins	75	0.2%	Lost

- 2006 race for Maryland State Senate – District 3

Name	Votes	Percent	Outcome
Alex X. Mooney, Rep.	21,844	51.9%	Won
Candy O. Greenway, Dem.	20,111	47.8%	Lost
Other Write-Ins	104	0.2%	Lost

- 2002 race for Maryland State Senate – District 3

Name	Votes	Percent	Outcome
Alex X. Mooney, Rep.	21,617	55.0%	Won
C. Sue Hecht, Dem.	17,654	44.9%	Lost
Other Write-Ins	66	0.2%	Lost

- 1998 race for Maryland State Senate – District 3

Name	Votes	Percent	Outcome
Alex X. Mooney, Rep.	18,399	56%	Won
Ronald S. Bird, Dem.	14,212	44%	Lost

=== New Hampshire ===
- 1992 Race for New Hampshire State House – Grafton 10

Name	Votes	Percent	Outcome
Sharon Nordgren, Dem.	3,540	18.96%	Won
Marion L. Copenhaver, Dem.	3,484	18.66%	Won
Elizabeth L. Crory, Dem.	3,286	17.60%	Won
Robert Guest, Dem.	3,219	17.24%	Won
Linde McNamara, Rep.	1,820	9.75%	Lost
Fred Carleton, Rep.	1,742	9.33%	Lost
Alex X. Mooney, Rep.	1,580	8.46%	Lost

== Personal life ==
Mooney and his wife, Grace Mooney, live in Charles Town, West Virginia, with their three children. Mooney is Roman Catholic.

== See also ==
- List of Hispanic and Latino Americans in the United States Congress

Party political offices
Preceded by Audrey Scott	Chair of the Maryland Republican Party; 2010–2013	Succeeded by Diana Waterman
U.S. House of Representatives
Preceded by Shelley Moore Capito	Member of the U.S. House of Representatives from West Virginia's 2nd congressional district 2015–2025	Succeeded by Riley Moore
U.S. order of precedence (ceremonial)
Preceded by Harley O. Staggers Jr. as Former U.S. Representative	Order of precedence of the United States as Former U.S. Representative	Succeeded by Tom Tancredo as Former U.S. Representative
