= 2018 United States House of Representatives elections in West Virginia =

- November 6, 2018

All 3 West Virginia seats to the United States House of Representatives
	Majority party	Minority party
Party	Republican	Democratic
Last election	3	0
Seats won	3	0
Seat change	Steady	Steady
Popular vote	337,146	234,568
Percentage	58.33%	40.58%
Swing	▼6.51%	▲7.88%

Republican
40–50%
50–60%
60–70%
70–80%
80–90%
Democratic
50–60%

The 2018 United States House of Representatives elections in West Virginia were held on November 6, 2018, to elect the three U.S. representatives from the West Virginia, one from each of the state's three congressional districts. The filing deadline was January 27, 2018. The primary elections were held on May 8, 2018. The elections coincided with the other elections to the House of Representatives, elections to the United States Senate and various state and local elections.

The 2018 elections resulted in no change in partisan representation, with the Republican incumbents in Districts 1 and 2 winning re-election, and the Republicans holding the open-seat election in District 3, leaving the House delegation at 3-0 Republican.

== Overview ==
Popular vote
Republican	58.33%
Democratic	40.58%
Mountain (Green)	1.09%

House seats
Republican	100%
Democratic	0%

=== By district ===
Results of the 2018 United States House of Representatives elections in West Virginia by district:

District	Republican		Democratic		Others		Total		Result
District	Votes	%	Votes	%	Votes	%	Votes	%	Result
District 1	127,997	64.58%	70,217	35.42%	0	0.00%	198,214	100%	Republican hold
District 2	110,504	53.96%	88,011	42.98%	6,277	3.06%	204,792	100%	Republican hold
District 3	98,645	56.37%	76,340	43.63%	0	0.00%	174,985	100%	Republican hold
Total	337,146	58.33%	234,568	40.58%	6,277	1.09%	577,991	100%	

== District 1 ==
2018 West Virginia's 1st congressional district election
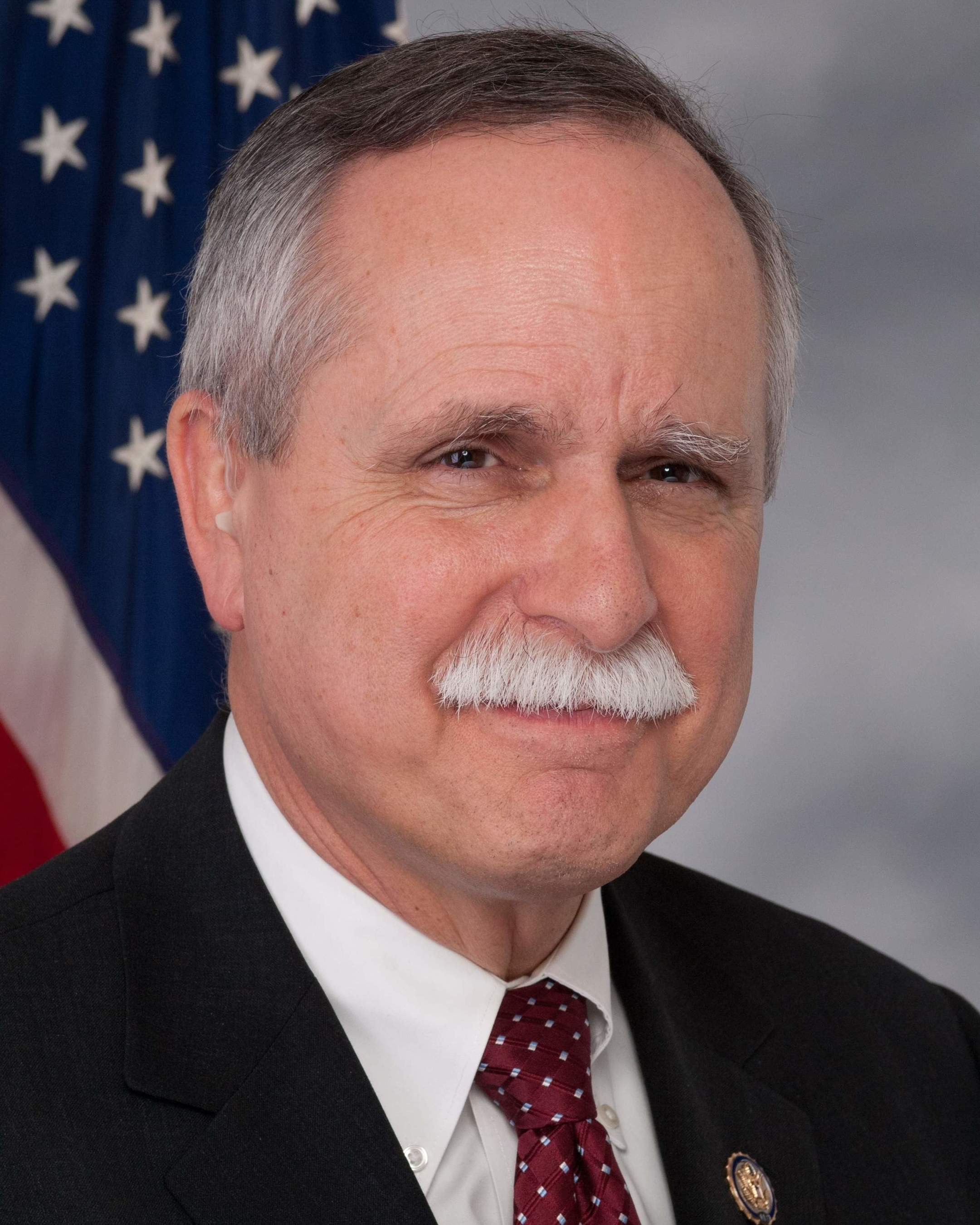

Nominee	David McKinley	Kendra Fershee
Party	Republican	Democratic
Popular vote	127,997	70,217
Percentage	64.6%	35.4%
- County results McKinley: 50–60% 60–70% 70–80% 80–90% Fershee: 50–60%
U.S. Representative before election
David McKinley
Republican
Elected U.S. Representative
David McKinley
Republican

Republican incumbent David McKinley had represented the district since 2011. In 2016, he was reelected with 68.97% of the vote. McKinley successfully ran for re-election.

=== Democratic primary ===
- Ralph Baxter, former chairman and CEO of the law firm Orrick, Herrington & Sutcliffe
- Kendra Fershee, West Virginia University law professor
- Tom Payne, attorney

==== Primary results ====
Democratic primary results
Party	Candidate	Votes	%
Democratic	Kendra Fershee	23,030	47.3
Democratic	Ralph Baxter	18,542	38.1
Democratic	Tom Payne	7,131	14.6
Total votes		48,703	100.0

=== Republican primary ===
- David McKinley, incumbent

==== Primary results ====
Republican primary results
Party	Candidate	Votes	%
Republican	David McKinley (incumbent)	40,122	100.0
Total votes		40,122	100.0

=== General election ===
==== Predictions ====
Source	Ranking	As of
The Cook Political Report	Safe R	November 5, 2018
Inside Elections	Safe R	November 5, 2018
Sabato's Crystal Ball	Safe R	November 5, 2018
RCP	Safe R	November 5, 2018
Daily Kos	Safe R	November 5, 2018
538	Safe R	November 7, 2018
CNN	Safe R	October 31, 2018
Politico	Safe R	November 4, 2018

==== Polling ====
Poll source	Date(s) administered	Sample size	Margin of error	David McKinley (R)	Kendra Fershee (D)	Undecided
Emerson College	October 28–31, 2018	341	± 5.5%	57%	32%	11%
Emerson College	September 13–15, 2018	275	± 6.3%	43%	14%	43%
Monmouth University	June 14–19, 2018	87 LV	± 14.4%	72%	24%	–
Monmouth University	June 14–19, 2018	87 RV	± 14.4%	68%	22%	–

==== Results ====
West Virginia's 1st congressional district, 2018
Party	Candidate	Votes	%
Republican	David McKinley (incumbent)	127,997	64.6
Democratic	Kendra Fershee	70,217	35.4
Total votes		198,214	100.0
Republican hold			

== District 2 ==
2018 West Virginia's 2nd congressional district election
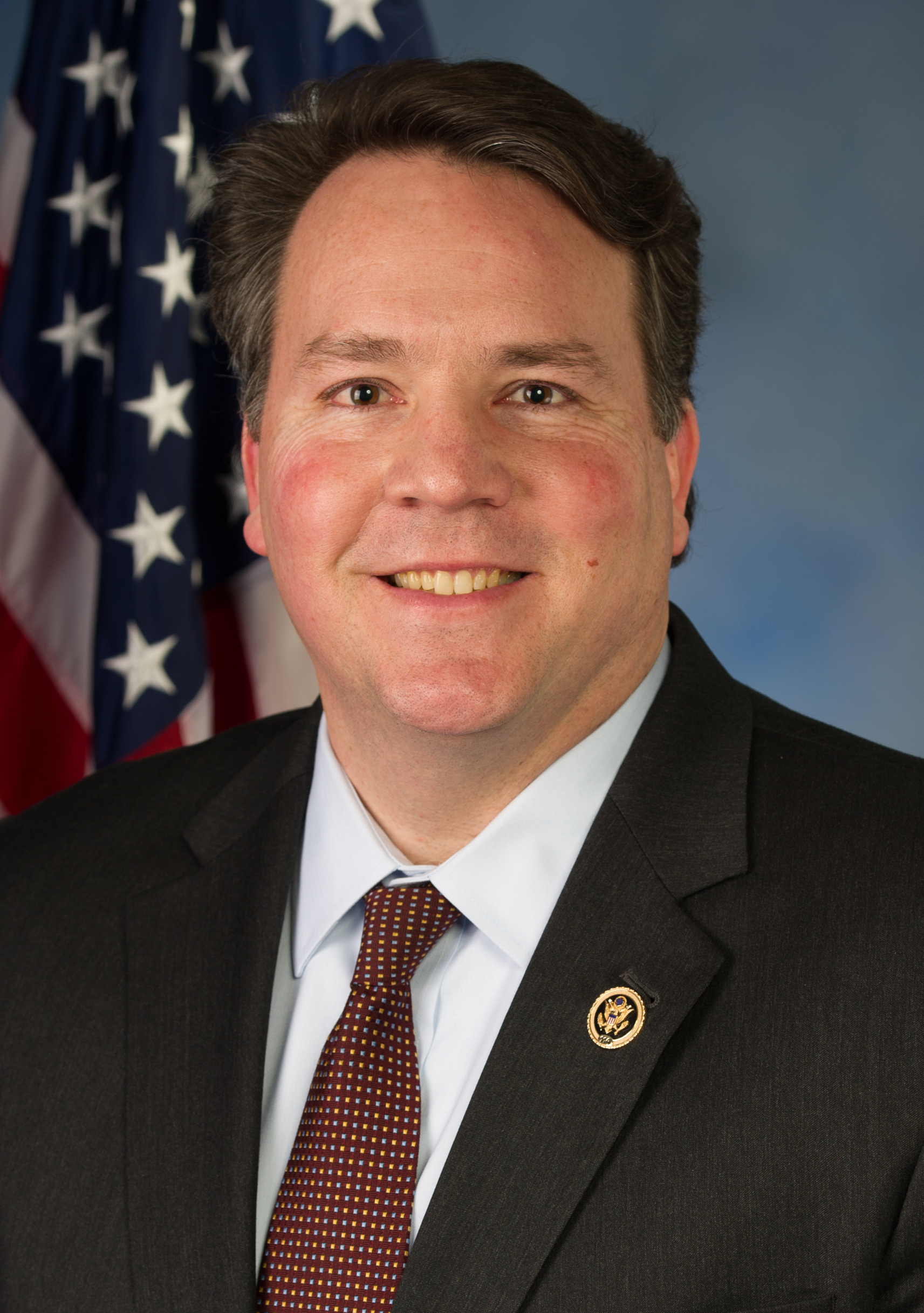

Nominee	Alex Mooney	Talley Sergent
Party	Republican	Democratic
Popular vote	110,504	88,011
Percentage	53.9%	43.0%
- County results Mooney: 40–50% 50–60% 60–70% 70–80% Sergent: 50–60%
U.S. Representative before election
Alex Mooney
Republican
Elected U.S. Representative
Alex Mooney
Republican

Republican incumbent Alex Mooney had represented the district since 2015. In 2016, he was reelected with 58.18% of the vote. Mooney successfully ran for reelection. West Virginia's 2nd district had been included on the initial list of Republican held seats being targeted by the Democratic Congressional Campaign Committee in 2018.

=== Democratic primary ===
- Aaron Scheinberg, veteran and former director of The Mission Continues
- Talley Sergent, former U.S. State Department official and West Virginia state director for Hillary Clinton's presidential campaign in 2016

==== Endorsements ====
Aaron Scheinberg (D)

Federal politicians

- Seth Moulton, U.S Representative (D-MA)

Individuals

- Joe Klein, political columnist for Time magazine and author

==== Primary results ====
Democratic primary results
Party	Candidate	Votes	%
Democratic	Talley Sergent	29,296	62.5
Democratic	Aaron Scheinberg	17,547	37.5
Total votes		46,843	100.0

=== Republican primary ===
- Alex Mooney, incumbent

==== Primary results ====
Republican primary results
Party	Candidate	Votes	%
Republican	Alex Mooney (incumbent)	36,477	100.0
Total votes		36,477	100.0

=== General election ===
==== Predictions ====
Source	Ranking	As of
The Cook Political Report	Likely R	November 5, 2018
Inside Elections	Safe R	November 5, 2018
Sabato's Crystal Ball	Safe R	November 5, 2018
RCP	Safe R	November 5, 2018
Daily Kos	Safe R	November 5, 2018
538	Likely R	November 7, 2018
CNN	Safe R	October 31, 2018
Politico	Safe R	November 4, 2018

==== Endorsements ====
Talley Sergent (D)

Federal politicians

- Joe Kennedy III, U.S. Representative (D-MA)

Statewide and local politicians

- Gaston Caperton, former governor of West Virginia
- Richard Ojeda, state senator
- John Perdue, State Treasurer of West Virginia
- Scott Rogers, Mayor of Charles Town

Individuals

- Aaron Scheinberg, veteran, former director of The Mission Continues and candidate for WV-2 in 2018
- Rod Snyder, former President of the Young Democrats of America and Democratic nominee for West Virginia House of Delegates in 2016 and 2004

Labor unions

- American Federation of Teachers - West Virginia Affiliate
- Brotherhood of Railroad Signalmen
- International Association of Sheet Metal, Air, Rail and Transportation Workers
- International Union of Operating Engineers Local 132
- National Education Association
- United Automobile Workers
- United Food and Commercial Workers Local 400
- United Steelworkers District 8
- West Virginia AFL–CIO
- West Virginia Education Association
- West Virginia School Service Personnel Association
- West Virginia State Building and Construction Trades Council, AFL-CIO

Organizations

- Alliance for Retired Americans
- EMILY's List
- Sierra Club West Virginia Chapter
- Upshur County Indivisible-Votes

Newspapers

- Charleston Gazette-Mail

==== Polling ====
Poll source	Date(s) administered	Sample size	Margin of error	Alex Mooney (R)	Talley Sergent (D)	Undecided
Emerson College	October 28–31, 2018	344	± 5.5%	47%	39%	10%
Emerson College	September 13–15, 2018	277	± 6.3%	32%	24%	44%
Monmouth University	June 14–19, 2018	138 LV	± 13.0%	52%	38%	—
Monmouth University	June 14–19, 2018	138 RV	± 13.0%	51%	33%	—

==== Results ====
West Virginia's 2nd congressional district, 2018
Party	Candidate	Votes	%
Republican	Alex Mooney (incumbent)	110,504	54.0
Democratic	Talley Sergent	88,011	43.0
Mountain	Daniel Lutz	6,277	3.0
Total votes		204,792	100.0
Republican hold			

== District 3 ==
2018 West Virginia's 3rd congressional district election
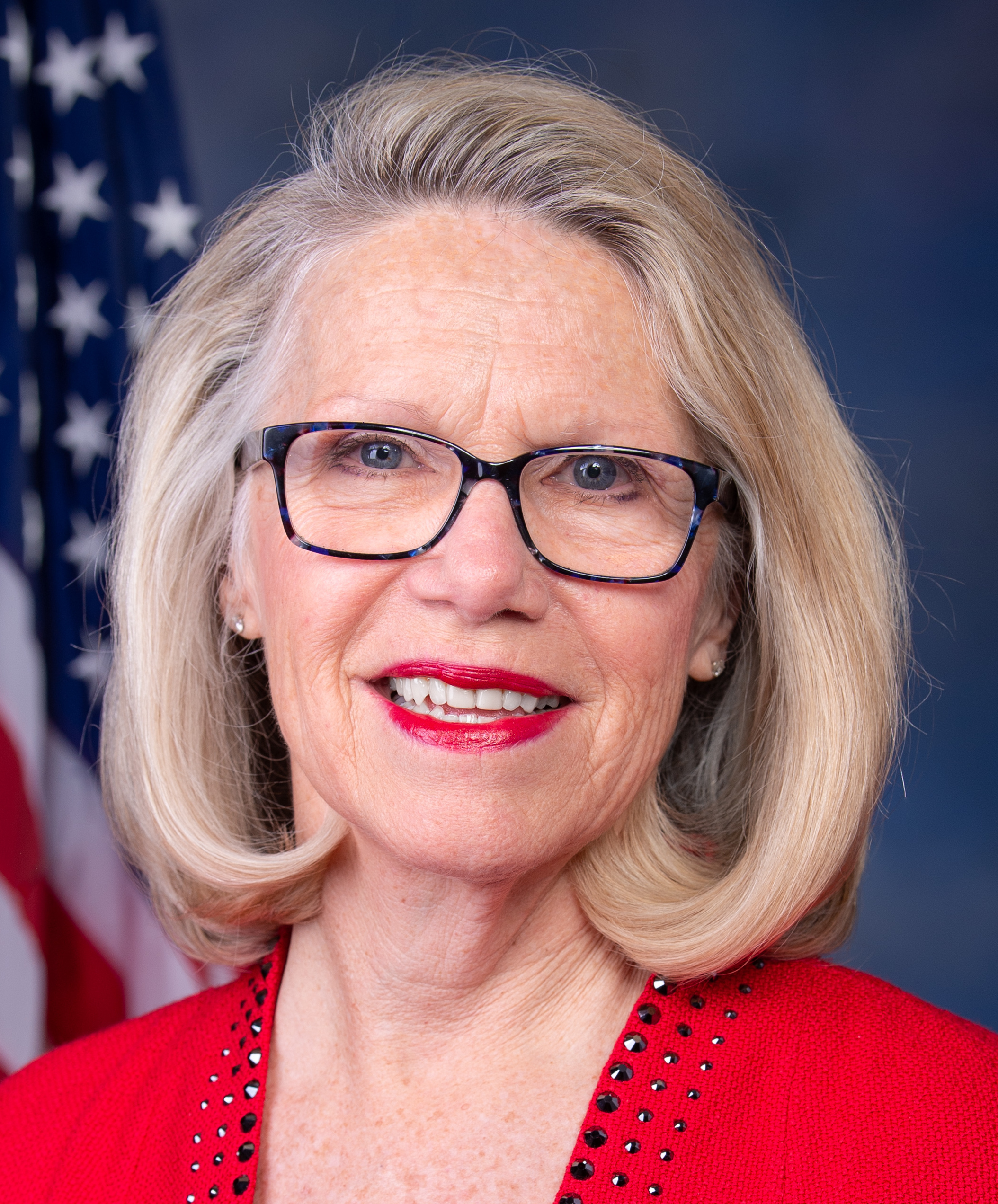

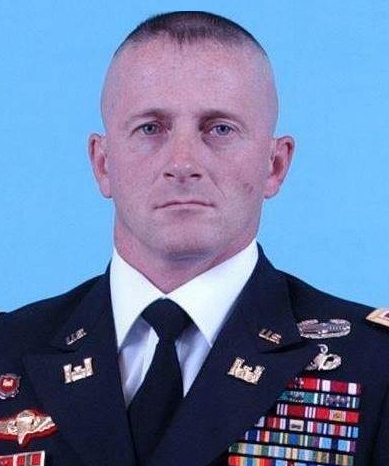
Nominee	Carol Miller	Richard Ojeda
Party	Republican	Democratic
Popular vote	98,645	76,340
Percentage	56.4%	43.6%
- County results Miller: 50–60% 60–70% Ojeda: 50–60%
U.S. Representative before election
Evan Jenkins
Republican
Elected U.S. Representative
Carol Miller
Republican

Republican incumbent Evan Jenkins had represented the district since 2015. In 2016, he was reelected with 67.88% of the vote. Jenkins vacated the seat to run for the Senate against Democratic incumbent Joe Manchin. He resigned September 30, 2018, to become justice of the Supreme Court of Appeals of West Virginia.

=== Democratic primary ===
- Paul Davis, CEO of the Tri-State Transit Authority
- Janice "Byrd" Hagerman
- Shirley Love, state delegate for District 32
- Richard Ojeda, state senator

==== Primary results ====
Results by county: Ojeda: 40–50%; 50–60%; 60–70%; 70–80%; Love: 40–50%; 50–60%; Davis: 40–50%

Democratic primary results
Party	Candidate	Votes	%
Democratic	Richard Ojeda	29,837	52.0
Democratic	Shirley Love	14,251	24.9
Democratic	Paul Davis	9,063	15.8
Democratic	Janice "Byrd" Hagerman	4,176	7.3
Total votes		57,327	100.0

=== Republican primary ===
- Ayne Amjad, physician
- Marty Gearheart, state delegate
- Conrad Lucas, chairman of the West Virginia Republican Party and candidate for West Virginia's 3rd congressional district in 2010
- Carol Miller, Majority Whip of the West Virginia House of Delegates and daughter of former U.S. representative Samuel Devine
- Philip Payton
- Rupert Phillips, state delegate
- Rick Snuffer, state delegate

==== Primary results ====
Results by county: Miller: 40–50%; 50–60%; Phillips: 40–50%; 50–60%; 70–80%; Gearheart: 20–30%; 30–40%; 40–50%; 60–70%; Lucas: 20–30%; 40–50%; Snuffer: 10–20%; 20–30%

Republican primary results
Party	Candidate	Votes	%
Republican	Carol Miller	8,936	23.8
Republican	Rupert Phillips	7,320	19.5
Republican	Marty Gearheart	6,833	18.2
Republican	Conrad Lucas	6,812	18.1
Republican	Rick Snuffer	4,032	10.7
Republican	Ayne Amjad	2,791	7.4
Republican	Philip Payton	861	2.3
Total votes		37,585	100.0

=== General election ===
==== Endorsements ====
Carol Miller (R)

Federal officials

- Mike Pence, 48th Vice President of the United States
- Donald Trump, 45th President of the United States

Organizations

- America First Action
- Huntington Regional Chamber of Commerce
- Maggie's List
- Republican Main Street Partnership
- Susan B. Anthony List
- West Virginia Chamber of Commerce
- Winning For Women
Richard Ojeda (D)

Federal politicians

- Joe Kennedy III, U.S. Representative (D-MA)
- Tim Ryan, U.S. Representative (D-OH)

Labor unions

- American Federation of Government Employees District 4
- American Federation of Teachers - West Virginia Affiliate
- Brotherhood of Railroad Signalmen
- Communications Workers of America
- International Association of Sheet Metal, Air, Rail and Transportation Workers
- International Union of Operating Engineers Local 132
- National Education Association
- Service Employees International Union District 1199
- United Automobile Workers
- United Food and Commercial Workers Local 400
- United Mine Workers of America
- United Steelworkers District 8
- West Virginia AFL–CIO
- West Virginia Education Association
- West Virginia School Service Personnel Association
- West Virginia State Building and Construction Trades Council, AFL-CIO

Organizations

- CHC Bold PAC
- Democratic Congressional Campaign Committee
- End Citizens United
- VoteVets.org
- West Virginia Working Families Party

Newspapers and news websites

- Huntington Herald-Dispatch

==== Predictions ====
Source	Ranking	As of
The Cook Political Report	Lean R	October 3, 2018
Inside Elections	Lean R	November 5, 2018
Sabato's Crystal Ball	Lean R	October 4, 2018
Daily Kos	Lean R	September 28, 2018
Fox News	Lean R	September 21, 2018
CNN	Tossup	October 2, 2018
RealClearPolitics	Lean R	September 21, 2018
The New York Times	Lean R	September 26, 2018
Politico	Tossup	September 21, 2018

==== Polling ====
Poll source	Date(s) administered	Sample size	Margin of error	Carol Miller (R)	Richard Ojeda (D)	Other	Undecided
Emerson College	October 28–31, 2018	328	± 5.5%	52%	45%	–	3%
NYT Upshot/Siena College	October 14–18, 2018	490	± 5.0%	46%	41%	–	13%
Monmouth University	October 10–14, 2018	343	± 5.2%	48%	45%	2%	5%
DCCC (D)	September 16, 2018	540	± 4.2%	44%	48%	–	8%
Emerson College	September 13–15, 2018	274	± 6.3%	31%	36%	–	33%
NYT Upshot/Siena College	September 8–10, 2018	499	± 5.0%	48%	40%	–	12%
Monmouth University	June 14–19, 2018	343 LV	± 5.3%	41%	47%	3%	9%
Monmouth University	June 14–19, 2018	428 RV	± 4.7%	41%	43%	3%	13%

==== Results ====
West Virginia's 3rd congressional district, 2018
Party	Candidate	Votes	%
Republican	Carol Miller	98,645	56.4
Democratic	Richard Ojeda	76,340	43.6
Total votes		174,985	100.0
Republican hold			
