= David McKinley =

American politician (1947–2026)

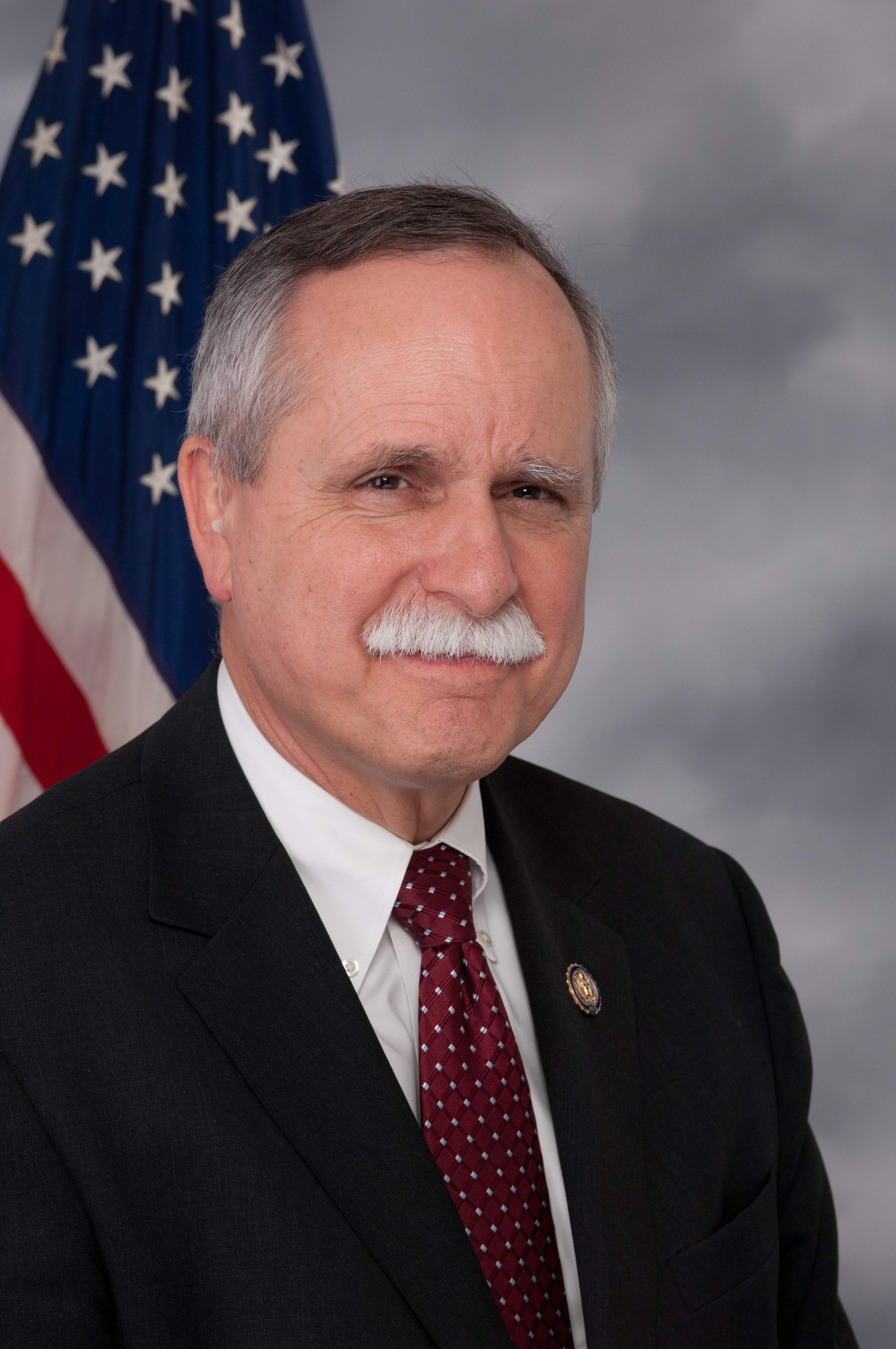
- Official portrait, c. 2011

Member of the U.S. House of Representatives from West Virginia's 1st district
- In office January 3, 2011 – January 3, 2023
- Preceded by: Alan Mollohan
- Succeeded by: Alex Mooney (redistricted)

Chair of the West Virginia Republican Party
- In office 1990–1994
- Preceded by: Hike Heiskell
- Succeeded by: John LeRose

Member of the West Virginia House of Delegates from the 3rd district
- In office December 15, 1980 – December 1, 1994
- Preceded by: George Daber
- Succeeded by: Tal Hutchins; Greg Martin

Personal details
- Born: David Bennett McKinley; March 28, 1947 Wheeling, West Virginia, U.S.
- Died: April 17, 2026 (aged 79) Wheeling, West Virginia, U.S.
- Party: Republican
- Spouse(s): Suzanne Holman (m. 1969; div. 1980) Mary Gerkin (m. 1981)
- Children: 4
- Education: Purdue University (BS)

David Bennett McKinley (March 28, 1947 – April 17, 2026) was an American businessman and politician who served as the U.S. representative for West Virginia's 1st congressional district from 2011 to 2023. A member of the Republican Party, McKinley was a member of the West Virginia House of Delegates from 1980 to 1994, and chaired the West Virginia Republican Party from 1990 to 1994.

McKinley was generally considered a moderate Republican. After West Virginia lost a House seat in the 2020 redistricting cycle, his district was merged with that of Representative Alex Mooney. McKinley lost to Mooney with 35.6% of the vote in the 2022 Republican primary.

== Early life and education ==
McKinley was born in Wheeling, West Virginia, on March 28, 1947. He earned a Bachelor of Science degree in engineering from Purdue University in 1970.

== Early career ==
McKinley worked as a civil engineer for 12 years until founding his own firm, McKinley and Associates, based in Wheeling. The 40-member firm has been involved in $1 billion in construction projects over the past 30 years.

McKinley and Associates has renovated structures of historic significance in West Virginia communities, such as the Capitol Theatre in Wheeling.

He was a member of the West Virginia House of Delegates from 1980 to 1994. From 1990 to 1994, he chaired the West Virginia Republican Party. As chair, he was very critical of West Virginia's two Democratic U.S. senators. In 1991, he criticized Senator Jay Rockefeller for exploring a run for president against President George H. W. Bush. In 1994, he criticized Senator Robert Byrd for opposing a Balanced Budget Amendment.

In 1996, McKinley ran in the Republican primary for governor against astronaut Jon McBride and former governor Cecil Underwood. He came in third place; Underwood won the general election.

== U.S. House of Representatives ==
=== Elections ===
West Virginia's 1st congressional district: Results 2010–2020
| Year | Republican | Votes | Pct | Democratic | Votes | Pct |
|---|---|---|---|---|---|---|
| 2010 | David McKinley | 90,660 | 50.4% | Mike Oliverio | 89,220 | 49.6% |
| 2012 | David McKinley | 133,809 | 62.5% | Sue Thorn | 80,342 | 37.5% |
| 2014 | David McKinley | 92,491 | 64.0% | Glen Gainer III | 52,109 | 36.0% |
| 2016 | David McKinley | 163,469 | 69.0% | Mike Manypenny | 73,534 | 31.0% |
| 2018 | David McKinley | 127,997 | 64.6% | Kendra Fershee | 70,217 | 35.4% |
| 2020 | David McKinley | 180,488 | 69.0% | Natalie Cline | 81,177 | 31.0% |

==== 2010 ====
McKinley ran in West Virginia's 1st congressional district. The Democratic incumbent, Alan Mollohan, lost the Democratic primary to the more conservative State Senator Mike Oliverio. McKinley won the six-candidate Republican primary with 35% of the vote. Mac Warner ranked second with 27% of the vote and State Senator Sarah Minear ranked third with 21%.

McKinley received many endorsements during his campaign, including from Parkersburg News, National Right to Life, the West Virginians for Life PAC, the National Federation of Independent Business, House Republicans Fund, West Virginia Farm Bureau, and the International Brotherhood of Electrical Workers.

McKinley narrowly defeated Oliverio, 50.4%–49.6%, a difference of just 1,440 votes. He became only the fourth person to represent the district since 1953.

==== 2012 ====
McKinley ran for reelection in the newly redrawn 1st district. He defeated Democratic nominee Sue Thorn, a former community organizer, 62%–38%, winning every county in the district.

==== 2014 ====
In 2013, McKinley announced that he would not run for the open U.S. Senate seat being vacated by Jay Rockefeller in 2014.

McKinley defeated the Democratic nominee, West Virginia State Auditor Glen Gainer III, 64%–36%.

==== 2016 ====
In 2016, McKinley defeated former State Delegate Mike Manypenny, 69%–31%.

==== 2018 ====
In 2018, McKinley defeated West Virginia University law professor Kendra Fershee, 64.6%–35.4%.

==== 2020 ====
In 2020, McKinley defeated computational linguist Natalie Cline 69%–31%.

==== 2022 ====
As a result of the 2020 United States Census and the 2020 redistricting cycle, the West Virginia legislature divided the state into northern and southern districts. Since statehood, the 1st district had always been the state's northernmost district, but the legislature ended this practice. The Charleston-based 2nd district was eliminated, and its easternmost counties were merged with the bulk of the old 1st district to form the new 2nd district. This resulted in McKinley and the old 2nd district's incumbent, fellow Republican Alex Mooney, being together in the new 2nd district, and both incumbents declared their intention to run in the district.

In a race that received nationwide attention, Mooney handily defeated McKinley in the Republican primary on May 10 even though the new district was geographically and demographically more McKinley's district. Donald Trump endorsed Mooney before the election, and McKinley, who was ranked as one of the most bipartisan members of Congress, was criticized for holding moderate views.

=== Tenure ===
McKinley broke ranks with the Republican majority several times in his tenure in Congress. In April 2011, he was one of only four Republican members of Congress to vote against the Republican budget proposal of 2012.

McKinley was ranked the 22nd most bipartisan member of the House during the 114th United States Congress (and the most bipartisan House member from West Virginia) by the Bipartisan Index created by The Lugar Center and the McCourt School of Public Policy, which ranks members of Congress by their degree of bipartisanship (by measuring how often each member's bills attract co-sponsors from the opposite party and each member co-sponsors bills by members of the opposite party).

=== Political positions ===
==== Jobs ====
McKinley was an active supporter of the Coal Miner Employment and Domestic Energy Infrastructure Protection Act. Also known as the Stop the War on Coal Act, it aims to protect American jobs and prevent legislation that would reduce mining jobs. McKinley said, "The constant attacks on coal have to stop."

McKinley was one of 233 representatives in favor of the act, which passed in September 2012. He said, "Our job creators need a consistent and predictable regulatory program that will protect jobs we have and create new one." On November 5, 2021, McKinley was one of 13 House Republicans to break with their party and vote with a majority of Democrats in favor of the Infrastructure Investment and Jobs Act. On July 28, 2022, McKinley was one of 24 House Republicans to break with their party and vote with a majority of Democrats in favor of the CHIPS and Science Act.

In October 2011, McKinley was the only Republican freshman to vote against all three of the trade deals passed by Congress: Panama, Colombia, and South Korea. He said, "Free trade deals like NAFTA and CAFTA have been nothing more than broken promises that shipped our jobs overseas, and I won’t vote for any free trade agreements unless they’re fair to my constituents."

McKinley expressed concern about the United States' "unchecked spending", which he said resulted in being "beholden to countries like China and Japan who own a significant amount of our debt".

==== Gun control ====
McKinley was a strong supporter of the notion that people should be allowed to carry a concealed weapon. He was consistent in his voting patterns on gun control and continued this trend when voting yes on Requiring State Reciprocity for Carrying Concealed Firearms. He received an “A” rating from the NRA Political Victory Fund. In 2012 the NRA was one of McKinley's main endorsers.

==== Abortion ====
McKinley opposed abortion rights. He believed "[t]he use of federal funds to pay for ending the life of an unborn child is appalling", even though federal funds are not used to pay for abortions, per the Hyde Amendment. He voted for the District of Columbia Pain-Capable Unborn Child Protection Act in July 2012, which did not pass. This act would have prohibited abortion in the District of Columbia. The National Right to Life Committee gave McKinley a 100% rating on abortion issues from 2011 to the present.

==== Climate change ====
On May 23, 2013, McKinley introduced the Better Buildings Act of 2014. The bill would amend federal law aimed at improving the energy efficiency of commercial office buildings. It would create a program called "Tenant Star" similar to the existing Energy Star program. He argued in favor of the bill, saying, "finding ways to use energy efficiently is common sense. We ought to be promoting efficiency as a way to save energy, money and create jobs."

In May 2014, McKinley offered an amendment to the Howard P. "Buck" McKeon National Defense Authorization Act for Fiscal Year 2015 that bars the U.S. Department of Defense from using funds to assess climate change and its implications for U.S. national security.

In January 2020, McKinley and Representative Kurt Schrader co-authored an opinion piece for USA Today on climate change. It read in part, "climate change is the greatest environmental and energy challenge of our time, and our government is failing to meet it. Instead of energy policy that lurches in a different direction after every election cycle, we need a new approach to develop realistic solutions that will enjoy support from both parties in Congress. Setting a steady course would be far better for both industry and the environment." The piece also called for "policies that will make clean energy technologies for all fuels affordable—solar, wind, hydro and other renewables, as well as nuclear, carbon capture for fossil fuels, energy efficiency, storage, and other technologies that will make the grid more secure, resilient, and affordable."

==== January 6 commission ====
On May 19, 2021, McKinley was one of 35 Republicans who joined all Democrats in voting to approve legislation to establish the January 6 commission meant to investigate the storming of the U.S. Capitol.

==== Vaccination ====
On November 30, McKinley was the only West Virginia representative to vote for H.R. 550: Immunization Infrastructure Modernization Act of 2021. The bill helps create confidential, population-based databases that maintain a record of vaccine administrations.

==== LGBT rights ====
In 2015, McKinley was one of 60 Republicans voting to uphold President Barack Obama's 2014 executive order banning federal contractors from making hiring decisions that discriminate based on sexual orientation or gender identity.

=== Committee assignments ===
- Committee on Energy and Commerce
  - Subcommittee on Energy and Power
  - Subcommittee on Environment and Climate Change
  - Subcommittee on Oversight and Investigations

=== Caucus memberships ===
- Republican Study Committee
- United States Congressional International Conservation Caucus
- Marcellus Shale Caucus (Founder)
- Tea Party Caucus
- Congressional Arts Caucus
- Congressional Cement Caucus
- Republican Main Street Partnership
- Republican Governance Group

== Personal life and death ==
McKinley was a seventh-generation resident of Wheeling, West Virginia. He had four children and six grandchildren. His wife, Mary, was a critical care nurse for 39 years. She holds a master's degree in nursing. McKinley was an Episcopalian.

McKinley died in Wheeling on April 17, 2026, at the age of 79.

Party political offices
| Preceded by Hike Heiskell | Chair of the West Virginia Republican Party; 1990–1994 | Succeeded by John LeRose |
U.S. House of Representatives
| Preceded by Alan Mollohan | Member of the U.S. House of Representatives from West Virginia's 1st congressional district 2011–2023 | Succeeded by Carol Miller |
