= 2016 United States House of Representatives elections in West Virginia =

- November 8, 2016

All 3 West Virginia seats to the United States House of Representatives
	Majority party	Minority party
Party	Republican	Democratic
Last election	3	0
Seats won	3	0
Seat change	Steady	Steady
Popular vote	445,017	224,449
Percentage	64.84%	32.70%
Swing	▲9.58%	▼8.83%

Republican
40–50%
50–60%
60–70%
70–80%
80–90%
Democratic
50–60%

The 2016 United States House of Representatives elections in West Virginia were held on November 8, 2016, to elect the three U.S. representatives from the state of West Virginia, one from each of the state's three congressional districts. The elections coincided with the 2016 U.S. presidential election, as well as other elections to the House of Representatives, elections to the United States Senate and various state and local elections.

The primaries were held on May 10.

== Overview ==
Popular vote
Republican	64.84%
Democratic	32.70%
Libertarian	2.46%

House seats
Republican	100.0%
Democratic	0%
Libertarian	0%

=== By district ===
Results of the 2016 United States House of Representatives elections in West Virginia by district:

District	Republican		Democratic		Others		Total		Result
District	Votes	%	Votes	%	Votes	%	Votes	%	Result
District 1	163,469	68.97%	73,534	31.03%	0	0.00%	237,003	100.0%	Republican hold
District 2	140,807	58.18%	101,207	41.82%	0	0.00%	242,014	100.0%	Republican hold
District 3	140,741	67.88%	49,708	23.98%	16,883	8.14%	207,332	100.0%	Republican hold
Total	445,017	64.84%	224,449	32.70%	16,883	2.46%	686,349	100.0%	

== District 1 ==
2016 West Virginia's 1st congressional district election
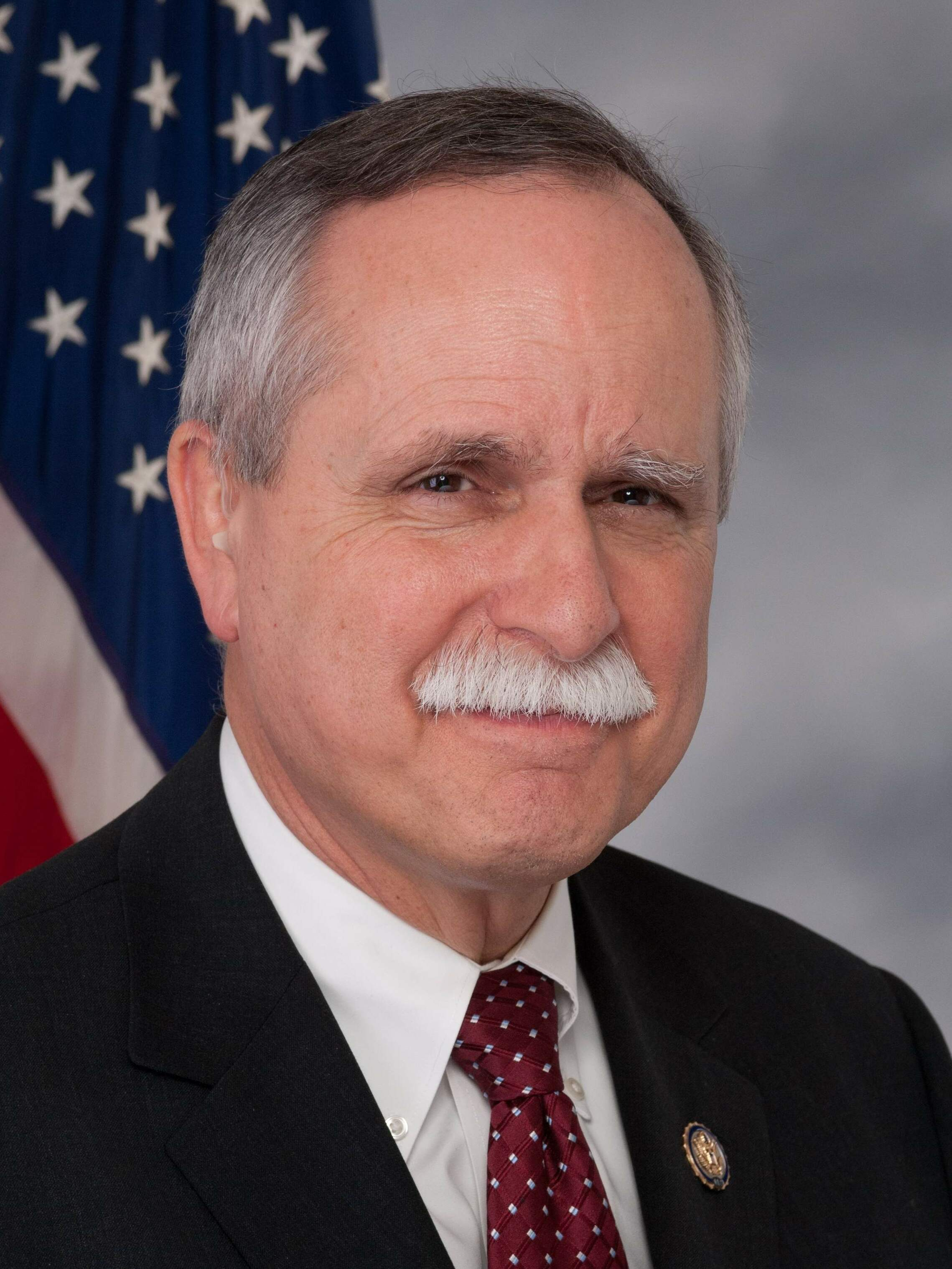

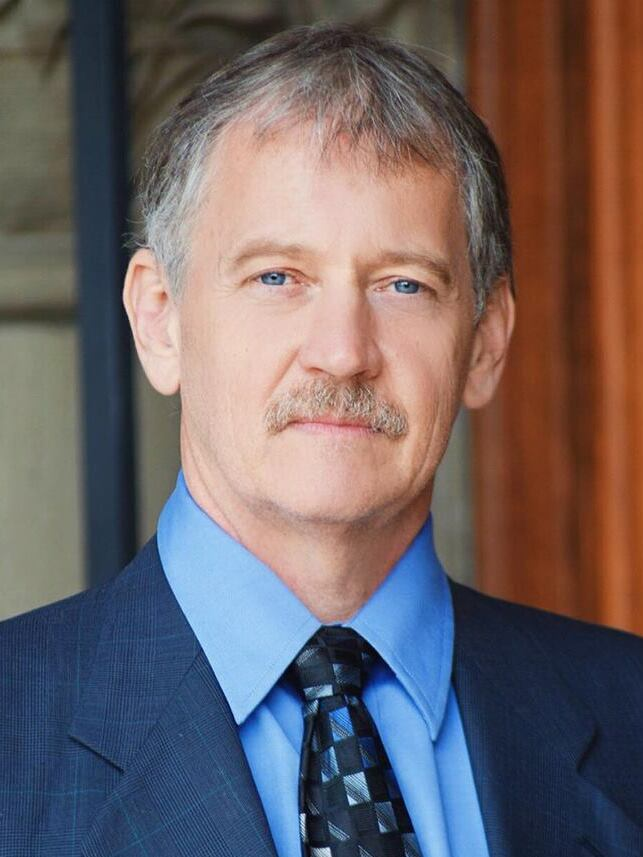
Nominee	David McKinley	Mike Manypenny
Party	Republican	Democratic
Popular vote	163,469	73,534
Percentage	69.0%	31.0%
- County results McKinley: 50–60% 60–70% 70–80% 80–90% Manypenny: 50–60%
U.S. Representative before election
David McKinley
Republican
Elected U.S. Representative
David McKinley
Republican

The 1st district was located in northern West Virginia and consisted of Barbour, Brooke, Doddridge, Gilmer, Grant, Hancock, Harrison, Marion, Marshall, Mineral, Monongalia, Ohio, Pleasants, Preston, Ritchie, Taylor, Tucker, Tyler, Wetzel, and Wood counties, including the cities of Parkersburg, Morgantown, Wheeling, Weirton, Fairmont, and Clarksburg.

Incumbent Republican David McKinley, who had represented the district since 2011, ran for re-election. He was re-elected with 64% of the vote in 2014. The district had a PVI of R+14.

=== Republican primary ===
McKinley expressed an interest in running for Governor of West Virginia, but announced that he would run for re-election to the U.S. House.

==== Candidates ====
===== Nominee =====
- David McKinley, incumbent U.S. Representative

==== Results ====
Republican primary results
Party	Candidate	Votes	%
Republican	David McKinley (incumbent)	61,217	100.0
Total votes		61,217	100.0

=== Democratic primary ===
==== Candidates ====
===== Nominee =====
- Mike Manypenny, former state delegate

==== Results ====
Democratic primary results
Party	Candidate	Votes	%
Democratic	Mike Manypenny	60,911	100.0
Total votes		60,911	100.0

=== General election ===
==== Predictions ====
Source	Ranking	As of
The Cook Political Report	Safe R	November 7, 2016
Daily Kos Elections	Safe R	November 7, 2016
Rothenberg	Safe R	November 3, 2016
Sabato's Crystal Ball	Safe R	November 7, 2016
RCP	Safe R	October 31, 2016

==== Results ====
West Virginia's 1st congressional district, 2016
Party	Candidate	Votes	%
Republican	David McKinley (incumbent)	163,469	69.0
Democratic	Mike Manypenny	73,534	31.0
Total votes		237,003	100.0
Republican hold			

== District 2 ==
2016 West Virginia's 2nd congressional district election
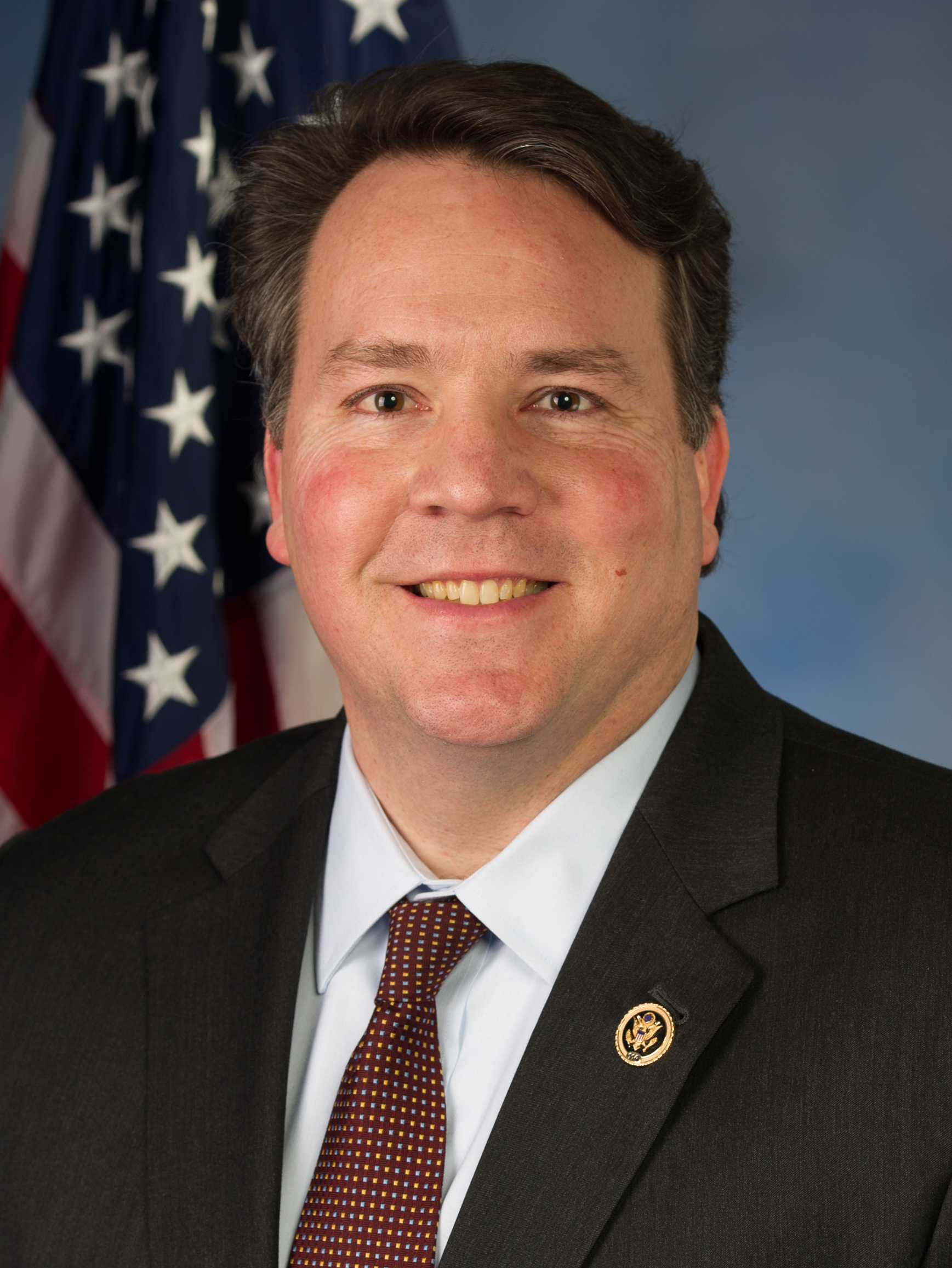

Nominee	Alex Mooney	Mark Hunt
Party	Republican	Democratic
Popular vote	140,807	101,207
Percentage	58.2%	41.8%
- County results Mooney: 50–60% 60–70% 70–80% Hunt: 50–60%
U.S. Representative before election
Alex Mooney
Republican
Elected U.S. Representative
Alex Mooney
Republican

The 2nd district was located in central West Virginia and consisted of Berkeley, Braxton, Calhoun, Clay, Hampshire, Hardy, Jackson, Jefferson, Kanawha, Lewis, Morgan, Pendleton, Putnam, Randolph, Roane, Upshur, and Wirt counties, including the cities of Charleston and Martinsburg.

Incumbent Republican Alex Mooney, who had represented the district since 2015, ran for re-election. He was re-elected with 47% of the vote in 2014. The district had a PVI of R+11.

=== Republican primary ===
==== Candidates ====
===== Nominee =====
- Alex Mooney, incumbent U.S. Representative

===== Eliminated in primary =====
- Marc Savitt, business owner

===== Declined =====
- Ken Reed, pharmacy owner and candidate for this seat in 2014

==== Results ====
Republican primary results
Party	Candidate	Votes	%
Republican	Alex Mooney (incumbent)	45,839	73.1
Republican	Marc Savitt	16,849	26.9
Total votes		62,688	100.0

=== Democratic primary ===
==== Candidates ====
===== Nominee =====
- Mark Hunt, former state delegate and candidate for this seat in 2006

===== Eliminated in primary =====
- Cory Simpson, Major in the Army Reserve, Afghanistan veteran and Bronze Star recipient
- Harvey D. Peyton, attorney
- Robert "Robin" Wilson Jr., candidate for state senate in 2014
- Tom Payne, attorney

===== Declined =====
- Nick Casey, former chair of the West Virginia Democratic Party and nominee for this seat in 2014
- Nancy Guthrie, state delegate

==== Endorsements ====
Mark Hunt

Individuals

- Nick Casey, former chair of the West Virginia Democratic Party and nominee for this seat in 2014
Harvey Peyton

Labor unions

- West Virginia Education Association
Cory Simpson

Organizations

- VoteVets

==== Results ====
Democratic primary results
Party	Candidate	Votes	%
Democratic	Mark Hunt	21,296	29.1
Democratic	Cory Simpson	19,180	26.2
Democratic	Tom Payne	15,250	20.8
Democratic	Harvey D. Peyton	11,143	15.2
Democratic	Robert "Robin" Wilson, Jr.	6,344	8.7
Total votes		73,213	100.0

=== General election ===
==== Polling ====
Poll source	Date(s) administered	Sample size	Margin of error	Alex Mooney (R)	Mark Hunt (D)	Undecided
Lake Research Partners Hunt (D-Hunt)	August 28–September 6, 2016	400	± 4.9%	38%	35%	27%

==== Predictions ====
Source	Ranking	As of
The Cook Political Report	Safe R	November 7, 2016
Daily Kos Elections	Safe R	November 7, 2016
Rothenberg	Safe R	November 3, 2016
Sabato's Crystal Ball	Safe R	November 7, 2016
RCP	Safe R	October 31, 2016

==== Results ====
West Virginia's 2nd congressional district, 2016
Party	Candidate	Votes	%
Republican	Alex Mooney (incumbent)	140,807	58.2
Democratic	Mark Hunt	101,207	41.8
Total votes		242,014	100.0
Republican hold			

== District 3 ==
2016 West Virginia's 3rd congressional district election
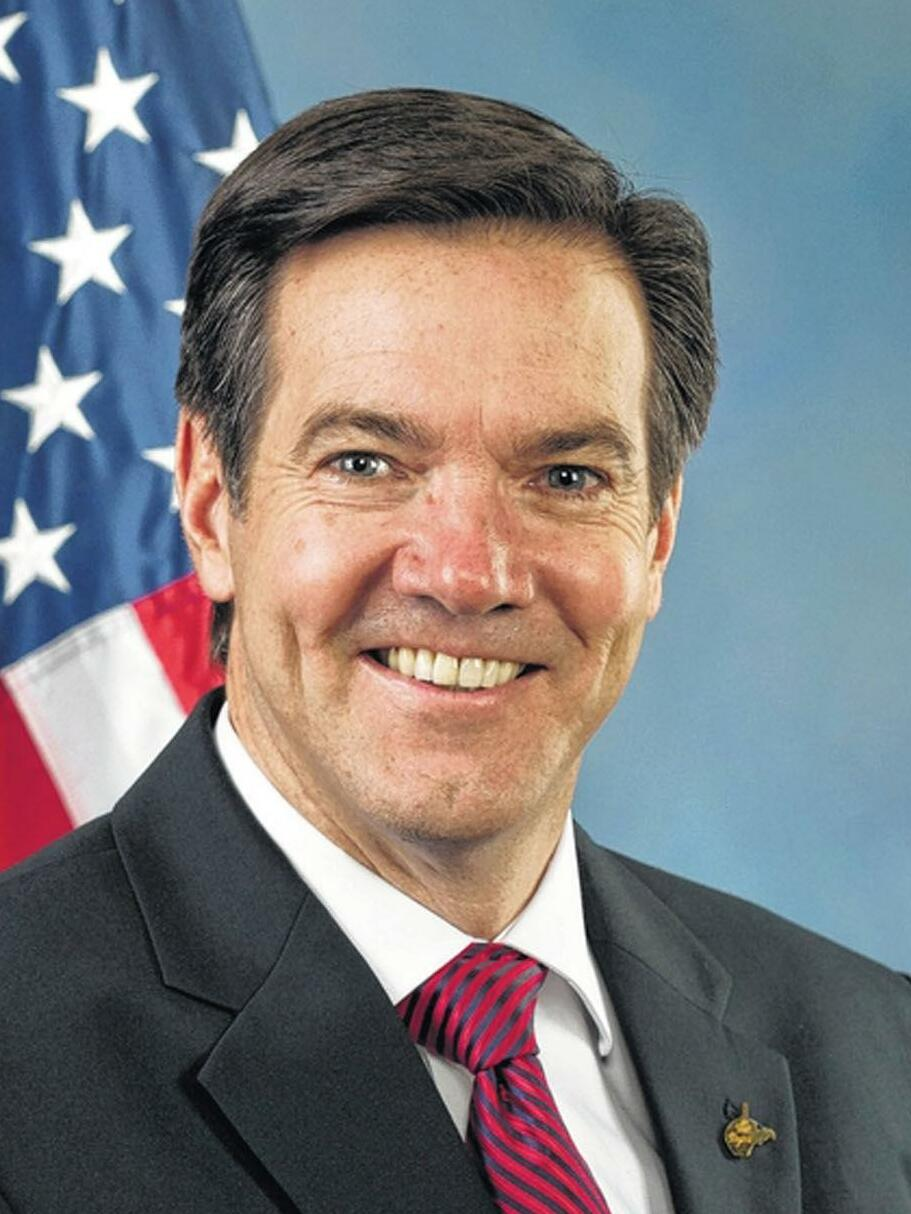

Nominee	Evan Jenkins	Matt Detch	Zane Lawhorn
Party	Republican	Democratic	Libertarian
Popular vote	140,741	49,708	16,883
Percentage	67.9%	24.0%	8.1%
- County results Jenkins: 40–50% 50–60% 60–70% 70–80% 80–90%
U.S. Representative before election
Evan Jenkins
Republican
Elected U.S. Representative
Evan Jenkins
Republican

The 3rd district was located in southern West Virginia and consisted of Boone, Cabell, Fayette, Greenbrier, Lincoln, Logan, Mason, McDowell, Mercer, Mingo, Monroe, Nicholas, Pocahontas, Raleigh, Summers, Wayne, Webster, and Wyoming counties, including the cities of Huntington and Beckley.

Incumbent Republican Evan Jenkins, who had represented the district since 2015, ran for re-election. He was elected with 55% of the vote in 2014. The district had a PVI of R+14.

=== Republican primary ===
==== Candidates ====
===== Nominee =====
- Evan Jenkins, incumbent U.S. Representative

==== Results ====
Republican primary results
Party	Candidate	Votes	%
Republican	Evan Jenkins (incumbent)	41,162	100.0
Total votes		41,162	100.0

=== Democratic primary ===
==== Candidates ====
===== Nominee =====
- Matt Detch, former United States Secret Service agent

===== Declined =====
- Mike Green, former state senator
- Earl Ray Tomblin, incumbent Governor
- Doug Reynolds, former state delegate

==== Results ====
Democratic primary results
Party	Candidate	Votes	%
Democratic	Matt Detch	53,703	100.0
Total votes		53,703	100.0

=== General election ===
==== Predictions ====
Source	Ranking	As of
The Cook Political Report	Safe R	November 7, 2016
Daily Kos Elections	Safe R	November 7, 2016
Rothenberg	Safe R	November 3, 2016
Sabato's Crystal Ball	Safe R	November 7, 2016
RCP	Safe R	October 31, 2016

==== Results ====
West Virginia's 3rd congressional district, 2016
Party	Candidate	Votes	%
Republican	Evan Jenkins (incumbent)	140,741	67.9
Democratic	Matt Detch	49,708	24.0
Libertarian	Zane Lawhorn	16,883	8.1
Total votes		207,332	100.0
Republican hold			
