= Nick Casey =

American lawyer

Chair of the West Virginia Democratic Party
- In office 2004–2010

Personal details
- Born: October 19, 1953 (age 72) Marmet, West Virginia, U.S.
- Party: Democratic
- Spouse: Mary Panzera Casey
- Children: Two
- Occupation: Attorney

George Nicholas Casey Jr. (born October 19, 1953) is a West Virginian attorney and accountant. Casey is the former chairman of the West Virginia Democratic Party, and currently serves as its treasurer. He was an unsuccessful candidate for Congress in 2014.

== Personal life and education ==
Casey earned a B.S. in accounting from the University of Kentucky and a J.D. from West Virginia University. Casey is married to Mary Panzera Casey.

== Career ==
Casey has served as treasurer for Senator and former Governor Joe Manchin's campaigns, and also served as campaign treasurer for Mario Palumbo. Casey served as chairman of the West Virginia Democratic Party from 2004 to 2010. In 2008, Casey was a Democratic superdelegate. In 2009, Casey was recommended for a federal judgeship by West Virginia Senators Robert Byrd and Jay Rockefeller; Casey ultimately was not nominated. Casey was also a candidate to succeed Robert Byrd after the latter's death, but Governor Joe Manchin appointed Carte Goodwin instead.

Casey was the managing partner of Lewis, Glasser, Casey, & Rollins, a Charleston-based law firm. Casey was elected treasurer of the American Bar Association in 2013, and previously served as president of the West Virginia Bar Association. Casey is also a certified public accountant. Casey has served as the chairman of the board of St. Francis Hospital, and has volunteered for Habitat for Humanity, Project HOPE, and Appalachia Service Project.

== 2014 congressional election ==
Casey ran for a seat in West Virginia's 2nd congressional district that was vacated after Republican Shelley Moore Capito decided to run for the Senate. Casey lost to Republican Alex Mooney who became the state's first Latino congressman.
