= Derrick Evans (politician) =

American politician (born 1985)

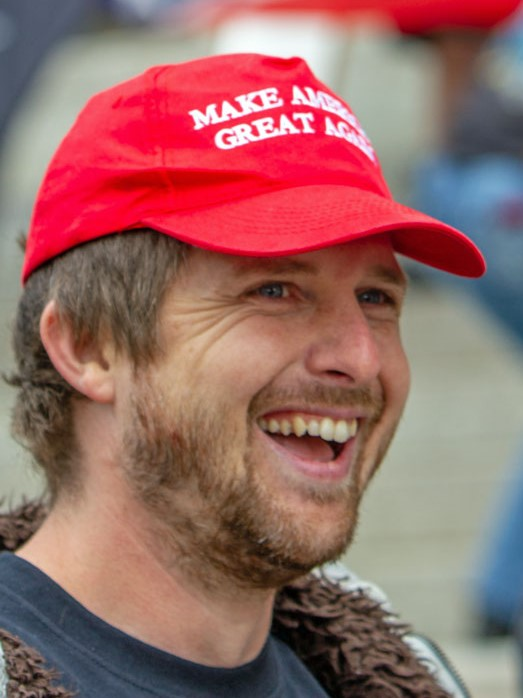

Member of the West Virginia House of Delegates from the 19th district
- In office December 1, 2020 – January 9, 2021
- Preceded by: Robert Thompson; Kenneth Hicks
- Succeeded by: Joshua Booth

Personal details
- Born: Jonathan Derrick Evans; April 2, 1985 (age 41) Prichard, West Virginia, U.S.
- Party: Democratic (before 2016); Libertarian (2016–2020); Republican (2020–present)
- Spouse: Melissa Pierzchala
- Children: 4
- Education: Marshall University; West Liberty University (BA)
- Website: Campaign website

Jonathan Derrick Evans (born April 2, 1985) is an American politician who was a member of the West Virginia House of Delegates from the 19th district from December 1, 2020, to January 9, 2021. He was an unsuccessful candidate for election to West Virginia's 1st congressional district in 2024, and after cancelling a bid for U.S. Senate in 2026, he declared another campaign for the 1st congressional district.

Evans participated in the January 6 attack against the U.S. Capitol. He was arrested two days after the attack and resigned from the House of Delegates the next day. In 2022, he pleaded guilty to a felony charge of civil disorder and was sentenced to 90 days in prison. He was pardoned by President Donald Trump on January 20, 2025, along with nearly every other participant in the Capitol attack.

== Early life and education ==
Evans is a native of Prichard, West Virginia. After attending Marshall University for one year, he earned a bachelor's degree from West Liberty University. He married Melissa Pierzchala from Sylvania, Ohio, who is the daughter of Gina and Steven Pierzchala and played volleyball at West Liberty University.

== Career ==
=== Early career ===
Evans worked as a high school teacher and football coach in Wayne County, coaching football at Tolsia High School from 2013 to 2017. In January 2017, he was hired to be a volunteer assistant quarterback coach for the Virginia Tech Hokies football team.

=== Anti-abortion activities ===
Before pursuing elected office, Evans was known as a confrontational local anti-abortion protester who, over the course of 2018 and 2019, harassed patients, staff, and volunteer escorts at the only clinic in West Virginia that performed abortions. Evans would livestream himself confronting people outside the clinic to tens of thousands of viewers. In addition to shouting abuse, Evans would livestream himself repeating clinic workers' names over and over and screaming their personal details. His activities prompted the clinic to put up a 10-foot high fence and alert police. Evans' harassment led a woman to file for and receive a restraining order over "many threats to my safety online and relentless harassment in person"; Evans subsequently violated the order.

Evans also frequently appeared at the West Virginia State Capitol, where he took photographs and videos of state legislators. Democratic delegate Danielle Walker said that Evans referred to her as "satanic" and equated her support for LGBTQ rights to defending pedophilia.

=== Politics ===
In 2016, Evans ran to represent the 19th district in the West Virginia House of Delegates. Initially Evans ran as a Democrat, but finished sixth in the primary. In the general election, Evans refiled to be on the ballot as a Libertarian; he was unable to win one of the district's two seats. In 2020, Evans ran once again as a Republican advancing through the primary and winning a seat in the general election.

Evans was embroiled in controversy during his 2020 campaign stemming from his membership in a Facebook group chat in which homophobic and Islamophobic language was used. Fellow delegate John Mandt, an alleged participant in the group chat, claimed that the messages attributed to him were fabricated but nonetheless announced his resignation. Evans not only confirmed his own participation in the group chat, but said that he stood by his comments calling Nihad Awad a "terrorist".

On December 25, 2023, Evans posted on X, formerly known as Twitter, a photo of a Christmas tree with ornaments of figures such as Joseph Biden, Kamala Harris, and Anthony Fauci with nooses on the figure's necks, along with a figure of Donald Trump who did not possess one. Evans later deleted the post after backlash from other commentators, stating that it was "[n]ot in good taste" and that it was not his tree or ornaments.

After announcing plans for a run in January 2023, Evans challenged incumbent Congresswoman Carol Miller in the 2024 Republican primary. He used his involvement in the January 6 Capitol attack as a campaign selling point, but ultimately lost the primary to Miller. In November 2024, Evans announced his campaign for United States Senate, challenging incumbent Senator Shelley Moore Capito in the 2026 primary. He withdrew from the Senate race in June 2025, instead seeking to again challenge Miller in the 2026 Republican primary. Evans ultimately did not complete the filing paperwork to run in the primary.

== Participation in the January 6 attack ==
Evans participated in the protest at the United States Capitol on January 6, 2021. Social media posts by Evans depict him traveling to Washington, D.C., with a busload of fellow Donald Trump supporters.

The Associated Press notes that in a video of Evans as he was attempting to breach the Capitol, he also could be heard chanting Trump's name repeatedly. Evans subsequently denied involvement in any destruction of property that took place during the riot, claiming that he was "simply there as an independent member of the media to film history."

Evans crossed the downed fence and entered the Capitol building, filming himself shouting "We're in, we're in. Derrick Evans is in the Capitol!" He continued, "We're in! Keep it moving, baby!" and, later, "Our house!" Inside the Capitol halls he said, "I don't know where we're going. I'm following the crowd."

His actions were condemned by Roger Hanshaw, the Speaker of the West Virginia House of Delegates, the minority leader of the West Virginia House of Delegates Doug Skaff, U.S. senator Joe Manchin, and governor Jim Justice.

Two days later, Evans was arrested and charged with one count of "knowingly entering or remaining in any restricted building or grounds without lawful authority" and one count of "violent entry and disorderly conduct on Capitol Grounds."

Evans resigned on January 10, 2021, saying, "I take full responsibility for my actions."

He pleaded not guilty to four misdemeanor charges in May 2021. In July 2021, a grand jury returned a five-count indictment against Evans, including the four previously charged misdemeanors and a new felony charge, obstructing an official proceeding and aiding or abetting. Negotiation of a possible plea agreement was ongoing in August 2021. On February 3, 2022, the day before Evans was supposed to appear in court for a hearing, Evans struck a plea agreement and lawyers asked the court for a hearing later in the month without releasing the terms of the plea agreement.

On March 18, 2022, Evans pleaded guilty to a felony charge of civil disorder stemming from the Capitol riot. Evans was sentenced to three months in prison on June 22, 2022. He reported to federal prison on July 25, 2022. He was held at the Federal Correctional Institution, Milan in Milan, Michigan, through October 23, 2022.

In 2023, Evans renounced his admissions of guilt for his actions on January 6, claiming to be a victim of political persecution and labeling himself as a "J6 Patriot" shortly after announcing his candidacy for a United States House of Representatives seat. Evans also made an appearance at CPAC 2023. Alongside fellow rioters Brandon Straka and Simone Gold, he was a speaker at a session titled "True Stories of January 6: The Prosecuted Speak."

On January 20, 2025, after beginning his second term in office, President Trump issued pardons to Evans and roughly 1,500 other individuals charged with crimes connected to January 6th. Evans celebrated the pardon on X, formerly Twitter, writing: "Praise the Lord. We won. My name is cleared. I have my rights back. I have my life back."

== Personal life ==
Evans and his wife Melissa have four children and live in Wayne County, West Virginia.

== Electoral history ==
2016 West Virginia House of Delegates Democratic primary election, 19th district
Party	Candidate	Votes	%
Democratic	Robert Thompson	2,603	23.32
Democratic	Kenneth Hicks (incumbent)	2,191	19.63
Democratic	Ric Griffith	1,992	17.84
Democratic	Matt McComas	1,316	11.79
Democratic	Gary Michels	1,151	10.31
Democratic	Derrick Evans	1,148	10.28
Democratic	Matt Stroud	763	6.83
Total votes		11,164	100.00

2016 West Virginia House of Delegates election, 19th district
Party	Candidate	Votes	%
Democratic	Robert Thompson	6,152	28.87
Democratic	Kenneth Hicks (incumbent)	4,998	23.45
Republican	Mark Ross	4,787	22.46
Republican	John D. Creamer	3,493	16.39
Libertarian	Derrick Evans	1,881	8.83
Total votes		21,311	100.00

2020 West Virginia House of Delegates Republican primary election, 19th district
Party	Candidate	Votes	%
Republican	Derrick Evans	2,189	50.21
Republican	Jason Stephens	1,090	25.00
Republican	E. Jay Marcum	1,081	24.79
Total votes		4,360	100.00

2020 West Virginia House of Delegates election, 19th district
Party	Candidate	Votes	%
Republican	Derrick Evans	8,227	37.30
Democratic	Ric Griffith	5,520	25.03
Republican	Jason Stephens	4,192	19.01
Democratic	David Thompson	4,115	18.66
Total votes		22,054	100.00

2024 United States House of Representatives Republican primary election, WV-01
Party	Candidate	Votes	%
Republican	Carol Miller (incumbent)	65,357	62.95
Republican	Derrick Evans	38,473	37.05
Total votes		103,830	100.00

== See also ==
- Criminal proceedings in the January 6 United States Capitol attack
- List of cases of the January 6 United States Capitol attack (A-F)
- List of people granted executive clemency in the second Trump presidency
