= Don Blankenship =

American business executive (born 1950)

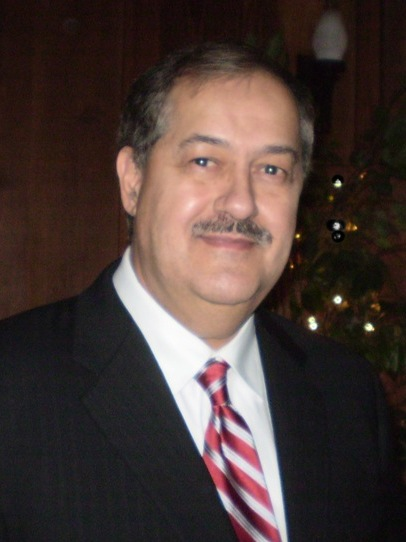
- Blankenship in 2010

Personal details
- Born: Donald Leon Blankenship; March 14, 1950 (age 76) Stopover, Kentucky, U.S.
- Party: Republican (before 2018); Constitution (2018–2023); Democratic (2023–present)
- Children: 2
- Education: Marshall University (BA)
- Website: Official website
- Criminal information
- Criminal charges: Conspiracy to violate mine safety and health standards
- Penalty: 1 year in federal prison $250,000 fine

Donald Leon Blankenship (born March 14, 1950) is an American businessman. He was chairman and CEO of the Massey Energy Company—the sixth-largest coal company (by 2008 production) in the United States—from 2000 until 2010 when an explosion at Massey's Upper Big Branch Mine resulted in the death of 29 workers. He served one year in prison for conspiring to violate federal mine safety standards.

Blankenship has frequently spoken out about politics, the environment, unions, and coal production. In the 2018 United States Senate election in West Virginia, Blankenship lost a three-way Republican primary to Patrick Morrisey. Citing false information and dirty politics for his loss and claiming a personal unwillingness to quit, Blankenship attempted to run as the Constitution Party nominee, but was unable to get on the ballot and later endorsed Morrisey. In January 2024, he declared his candidacy as a Democrat for the United States Senate seat held by retiring Senator Joe Manchin in the 2024 election, losing the primary election to Glenn Elliott. Blankenship was also the Constitution Party's nominee in the 2020 United States presidential election.

== Early life and education ==
Blankenship was born in Stopover, Kentucky, and raised in Delorme, West Virginia. His father served in the Korean War and his mother, Nancy McCoy, was a member of the McCoy family. The two divorced soon after Blankenship was born, and with the money from her divorce settlement Blankenship's mother opened a convenience store and gas station which she ran for 40 years. After graduating from Matewan High School in Matewan, West Virginia, in 1968, Blankenship earned a bachelor's degree in accounting from Marshall University in 1972 in three school years, having worked as a coal miner during summertime.

Blankenship is certified as a public accountant. In 2002, he was inducted into the American Institute of Certified Public Accountants' Business and Industry Hall of Fame. Blankenship has also been included in the Tug Valley Mining Institute Hall of Fame.

== Business career ==
Blankenship joined Massey Energy subsidiary Rawl Sales & Processing Co., in 1982. He went on to serve Massey Energy in a number of capacities. He was promoted to president of Massey Coal Services, Inc. (1989–1991), then president and chief operating officer from 1990 to 1991. In 1992, Blankenship was named president, chairman of the board of A.T. Massey. He is the first non-Massey family member to be in charge of the company. When A.T. Massey was spun off from Fluor Corporation as Massey Energy in 2000, Blankenship became the newly independent company's chairman and CEO. On December 3, 2010, Blankenship announced that he was retiring as CEO at the end of the year and would be succeeded by Massey President Baxter F. Phillips Jr. Blankenship had a reputation for resistance to spending money, willingness to litigate for contract difficulties, and personally going into mines to persuade workers to abandon union organizing efforts. In a 1980s documentary, he said, "It's like a jungle, where a jungle is survival of the fittest. Unions, communities, people—everybody's gonna have to learn to accept that in the United States you have a capitalist society, and that capitalism, from a business standpoint, is survival of the most productive."

In 1996, Blankenship was elected to the board of directors of engineering and construction company Fluor Corporation. He also serves as a director of the Center for Energy and Economic Development, a director of the National Mining Association, Mission West Virginia Inc, and was on the U.S. Chamber of Commerce board of directors.

Blankenship was paid $17.8 million (~$25.9 million in 2025) in 2009, the highest in the coal industry. It was a $6.8 million raise over 2008, and almost double his compensation package in 2007. Blankenship also received a deferred compensation package valued at $27.2 million (~$39.6 million in 2025) in 2009.

In 2011, Blankenship incorporated McCoy Coal Group, a coal company in Kentucky (not to be confused with the James River Coal Company subsidiary McCoy-Elkhorn Coal Corp). McCoy has yet to seek mining permits.

== Political campaigns ==
Blankenship is an active participant in West Virginia politics. During a speech at the Tug Valley Mining Institute on November 20, 2008, Blankenship called House Speaker Nancy Pelosi, Senator Harry Reid and former Vice President Al Gore "crazies" and "greeniacs." He has spoken out against media coverage and what he calls false attacks by liberal media. He has also said "the truth needs to be told about what happened at the Upper Big Branch coal mine" on the basis that a single individual from the U.S. Mine Safety and Health Administration was chosen to investigate the disaster.

=== U.S. Senate campaigns ===
==== 2018 ====
Citing his displeasure with federal handling of the coal industry, and his longtime criticisms of the condition of West Virginia politics in general, Blankenship ran for U.S. Senate in the 2018 Senate election, challenging incumbent Democratic U.S. Senator Joe Manchin. His television ads were aimed at "getting the truth out" about the Upper Big Branch explosion and "exposing the government cover-up." The ads further claimed Blankenship had documents showing that the MSHA Upper Big Branch internal report was falsified and that the company was forced by the MSHA to use a defective ventilation system.

He also expressed a belief that Donald Trump's proposed Mexico-United States border wall in conjunction with ending sanctuary cities would help stop drug trafficking.

Blankenship said he was "Trumpier than Trump" but that the establishment was misinforming him because they did not want him "to be in the U.S. Senate and promote the president's agenda." The national Republican leadership and allied groups made statements and ran ads against Blankenship, and the day before the Republican primary, Trump posted a tweet urging voters to vote for either of Blankenship's major primary opponents, Evan Jenkins and Patrick Morrisey, because Blankenship would not be competitive in the general election. Trump's tweet came in the wake of reporting that internal Republican polling had shown a surge in Blankenship's support among likely primary voters. Senate Majority Leader Mitch McConnell, whom Blankenship harshly criticized in his campaign, reportedly urged Trump to express opposition to Blankenship.

During the Republican primary campaign, Blankenship received criticism for calling McConnell's wife Elaine Chao a "Chinaperson."

After Patrick Morrisey won the primary, Blankenship reentered the race as the nominee of the West Virginia Constitution Party.

Throughout his campaign he made a claim that the Upper Big Branch explosion was caused by the negligence of Mine Safety and Health Administration officials.

In the wake of his unsuccessful campaign, Blankenship sued numerous media organizations and individual journalists, alleging defamation, false light, invasion of privacy, and civil conspiracy because they misstated he was a "felon" after being convicted and served one year in prison for a federal criminal conspiracy offense when it was actually classified as misdemeanor; the case was dismissed at the federal district court level and that decision was affirmed on appeal to the United States Court of Appeals for the Fourth Circuit on February 22, 2023. In October 2023, the United States Supreme Court declined to overturn that ruling.

==== 2024 ====
On January 26, 2024, Blankenship announced that he would run for Manchin's Senate seat again that year, this time as a Democrat. Manchin had announced his retirement in November 2023. The West Virginia Democratic Party almost immediately disavowed his candidacy, with chairman Mike Pushkin stating that "Blankenship, or as he'll forever be known, federal prisoner 12393-088," does not represent the party's values. Blankenship himself has indicated that he would not join the Senate Democratic Caucus if elected.

Blankenship finished third and last in the Democratic primary, winning 18.5% of the vote and placing behind Zach Shrewsbury and winner Glenn Elliott. He carried Gilmer, Logan, and Mingo counties.

=== 2020 U.S. presidential campaign ===
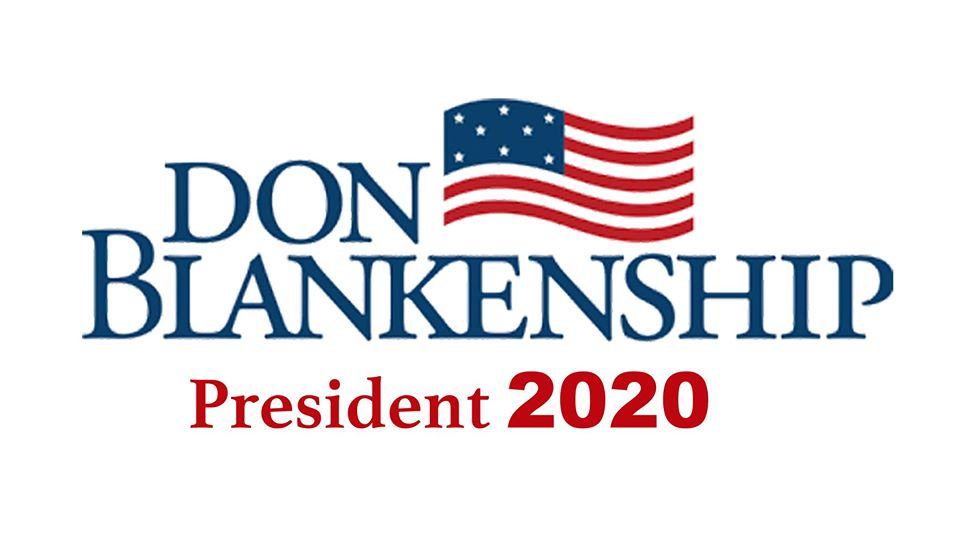
Blankenship presidential campaign logo

Blankenship launched his campaign for the Constitution Party nomination in the 2020 United States presidential election in October 2019 during a meeting of the Constitution Party national committee. He was nominated for president at the virtual Constitution Party Convention on the second ballot on May 2, 2020, with William Mohr as his running mate. Blankenship and Mohr went on to receive 60,080 votes.

== Political positions ==
Blankenship supports Friends of Coal, a West Virginia advocacy group founded as a countermeasure to environmental protection movements. He later released statements urging Trump to avoid legislation enacting harsher punishment for coal mine supervisors that violate health and safety protocols, saying that "coal supervisors are not criminals", and that harsher laws would not improve mine safety.

In 2016, Blankenship supported conservative advocacy groups to remove Democrats from the legislature. That same year, Hillary Clinton's campaign criticized him after he appeared at her campaign stop in Williamson, West Virginia.

=== Climate change ===
Blankenship rejects the scientific consensus on climate change. In a speech at the Tug Valley Mining Institute, he said, "I don't believe climate change is real." Blankenship reiterated his views on global warming in interviews with The Hill and Forbes.

In an October 30, 2009, letter to the editor of The Charleston Gazette, Blankenship denied that climate change, or global warming, exists, writing, "Why should we trust a report by the United Nations? The United Nations includes countries like Venezuela, North Korea and Iran." According to Blankenship, "the environmental movement isn't a great cause, it's a great business", and in addition to lying about the Upper Big Branch mine disaster, the government has also lied "about the science of global warming."

In 2018, at a Senate campaign town hall, Blankenship said that "climate change is probably a fact", but added that American-made climate change is not, arguing that China's increase in coal production is the reason.

=== Mine safety ===
At a 2009 Labor Day rally in West Virginia, Blankenship said that federal and state mining regulators are ineffective at improving mine safety, and that the mining companies themselves are better suited to the task and should have less oversight, saying, "Washington and state politicians have no idea how to improve miners' safety."

Before and during his 2018 Senate campaign, Blankenship blamed the federal regulators of the MSHA for the Upper Big Branch Disaster for directing airflow targets in the mine.

== Controversies ==
=== Deborah May ===
A former employee of Blankenship, Deborah May, filed a lawsuit claiming that stress from personal abuse forced her to quit her job in November 2005. The lawsuit claimed that such comparatively minor mistakes as a wrong breakfast order from McDonald's, misplaced ice cream in the freezer, and an improperly hung jacket in the closet caused difficulties with Blankenship.

In June 2008, the West Virginia Supreme Court of Appeals ruled that May was entitled to unemployment benefits because due to "the unrefuted evidence" that Blankenship had "physically grabbed" May, had thrown food after she brought back the wrong fast-food order, and tore a tie rack and coat hanger out of a closet after she forgot to leave the hanger out for his coat. Blankenship's conduct, referred to as "shocking" by the court, contributed to their decision that May should get unemployment benefits as she was in effect fired because she was put in a position where she felt compelled to quit.

=== Upper Big Branch explosion ===
On April 5, 2010, an explosion at Massey's Upper Big Branch mine killed 29 miners. It was the worst U.S. coal mining disaster since 1970, when an explosion killed 38 in Hyden, Kentucky. NPR reported Massey executive Stanley Suboleski as saying that MSHA-ordered airflow changes, made hours before the explosion, "were changes the company opposed but complied with anyway." On April 12, New York State Comptroller Thomas DiNapoli, trustee of the New York State Common Retirement Fund which held 303,550 shares of Massey stock, called for Blankenship to resign immediately. "This tragedy was a failure both of risk management and effective board oversight. Blankenship must step down and make room for more responsible leadership at Massey." On April 22, Massey Energy's lead independent director Bobby R. Inman announced that "Blankenship has the full support and confidence of the Massey Energy Board of Directors." On April 25, President Barack Obama, Vice President Joe Biden, and state officials paid tribute to the 29 coal miners at a memorial service in Beckley, West Virginia.

Prosecutors said Massey manipulated the ventilation system during inspections of the Upper Big Branch mine to fool safety officials and disabled a methane monitor on a cutting machine a few months before the explosion on April 5, 2010. In March 2013, Blankenship was directly implicated in conspiring to skirt safety regulations when a former Massey Energy official accused Blankenship of conspiring and plotting to hide safety violations from federal safety inspectors. The implication was that Blankenship would order his officials to warn mine operators when the federal inspectors were coming for "surprise" visits, and to quickly cover up any safety violations.

Blankenship was convicted of a single misdemeanor charge of conspiring to violate federal mine safety standards and went on to serve a one-year prison sentence. He called himself a "political prisoner", feuded with United States Senator Joe Manchin and the Mine Safety and Health Administration (MSHA) over the explosion, considered running against Manchin for the Senate, and called for a new investigation into the explosion. On May 25, 2017, he formally appealed his case to the U.S. Supreme Court. His petition argued that the U.S. District Court in Charleston and the 4th Circuit Court of Appeals in Richmond, Virginia, "both erred in rulings, and they claim Blankenship was a victim of politics."

In August 2017, Blankenship funded a television ad featuring the sister of one of the miners killed in the Upper Big Branch coal mine explosion. The sister, Gwen Thomas, asks in the ad "if the United States Mine Safety and Health Administration insisted that changes be made which reduced Upper Big Branch's airflow before the explosion." She asks the government to publicly release the gas analyses taken after the explosion, and asks for help from Trump and Senators Joe Manchin and Shelley Moore Capito in getting answers. The US Center for Disease Control (CDC)'s National Institute for Occupational Safety and Health (NIOSH) found that the initial explosion could have been prevented by MSHA forcing Massey to avoid a build up of gas, and that subsequent injury could have been prevented by forcing Massey to avoid build up of coal dust. The NIOSH's page on Mining, says that to avoid Methane buildup "Large fans circulate air in mines to provide ventilation to the working areas."

In August 2018, Blankenship for Senate released a statement outlining a finding of the Department of Justice's Office of Professional Responsibility (DOJ-OPR) which had investigated Booth Goodwin and Steve Ruby, the prosecuting attorneys in Blankenship's federal trial. The DOJ-OPR found that both prosecutors were responsible for "recklessly" disregarding their discovery obligations, though the errors were not found to be deliberate. The conviction was upheld on appeal.

=== Groundwater ===
Blankenship has been accused of withholding knowledge of pollution. According to court papers, groundwater pollution from coal slurry injection by Massey Energy was contaminating wells around the home of Blakenship and his neighbors. Blankenship had a clean water line built to his own home from a nearby town. According to the accusation, Blankenship did not offer to provide uncontaminated water to any of his neighbors, and failed to inform them of any problem.

=== Campaign against Warren McGraw ===
In 2004, Blankenship contributed $3 million to the "And For The Sake of the Kids" PAC, campaigning against the reelection of West Virginia Supreme Court Justice Warren McGraw. Brent Benjamin went on to defeat McGraw in the general election. Of the election, Blankenship said, "I helped defeat a judge who had released a pedophile to work in a local school, who had driven doctors out of state, and who had cost workers their jobs for thirty plus years. I think this effort helped unchain West Virginia's economy and benefited working families." USA Today called Blankenship's ads "venomous." According to a USA Today editorial dated March 3, 2009, Blankenship "vividly illustrated how big money corrupts judicial elections. It puts justice up for sale to the highest bidder."

Notably, Blankenship's coal company Massey Coal had recently lost a civil case in West Virginia state court prior to the judicial campaign and had been ordered to pay a $50 million judgment. The case was pending on appeal as he sponsored Benjamin's campaign for a seat on the West Virginia Supreme Court. When the case was taken up on appeal, Benjamin was one of the judges in a position to decide the case. The plaintiff requested that Benjamin recuse himself owing to a conflict of interest stemming from Blankenship's contributions to his campaign, but he refused. Benjamin ultimately cast a decisive vote to vacate the lower court's judgment in a 3–2 decision. In Caperton v. A.T. Massey Coal Co., the Supreme Court ruled that Benjamin's refusal to recuse himself in light of such an obvious conflict of interest constituted a violation of the plaintiff's constitutional right to due process and remanded the case to the West Virginia Supreme Court.

Washington political journalist Michael Tomasky, a native West Virginian, claimed that Blankenship was "famous in West Virginia as the man who successfully bought himself a State Supreme Court Justice in 2004 and then tried to buy himself the state legislature, failing spectacularly at the latter effort." In his 2008 book Coal River, Michael Shnayerson reports that no such foundation was ever set up. Although Blankenship was the primary donor to "And For the Sake of Kids," other groups, including Doctors for Justice, contributed over $1 million to ASK. Another group, Citizens for Quality Health Care, funded in part by the West Virginia Chamber of Commerce, spent over $350,000 to defeat McGraw. Meanwhile, several groups spent millions opposing Benjamin and supporting McGraw, including West Virginia Consumers for Justice and Hugh Caperton, CEO of Harmon Development Corporation. Blankenship is featured in Laurence Leamer's 2013 book The Price of Justice: A True Story of Greed and Corruption and Peter Galuszka's 2012 book Thunder on the Mountain: Death at Massey and the Dirty Secrets Behind Big Coal.

=== Conflict of interest with Spike Maynard ===
On January 15, 2008, photographs of Blankenship vacationing on the French Riviera with West Virginia Supreme Court Justice Spike Maynard, while Massey had a case pending before that court, appeared in The New York Times. On April 3, 2008, ABC News reported that Blankenship attacked an ABC News photographer at a Massey facility near Belfry, Kentucky as the photographer attempted to question him about the photos. "If you're going to start taking pictures of me, you're liable to get shot!" Blankenship stated in the video. Maynard later lost his bid for reelection to the West Virginia Supreme Court in the primary election. On February 14, 2009, Blankenship told The New York Times, "I've been around West Virginia long enough to know that politicians don't stay bought, particularly ones that are going to be in office for 12 years... So I would never go out and spend money to try to gain favor with a politician. Eliminating a bad politician makes sense. Electing somebody hoping he's going to be in your favor doesn't make any sense at all."

=== Comments on Mitch McConnell ===
In April 2018, Blankenship released an ad in which he calls Senate Majority Leader Mitch McConnell "cocaine Mitch", urging potential voters to "ditch" McConnell. In May 2018, he released another ad attacking McConnell, his wife, Elaine Chao, and his in-laws as his "China family", and again called McConnell "cocaine Mitch".

The premise of the moniker was that McConnell's father-in-law owns a shipping company that in 2014 was found to have 90 pounds (41 kg) of cocaine on one of its vessels set to leave Colombia. The Colombian authorities did not accuse the company of conspiring to transport the cocaine, and the company was never investigated for the matter. McConnell, who has no role in the operation of his father-in-law's shipping business, was never suspected by any authorities of having any involvement in the incident. The Washington Post's Fact Checker column investigated the "cocaine Mitch" claims and gave them a "Four Pinocchios" rating, concluding that "Blankenship has no evidence to support his crude and incendiary attack."

McConnell was undisturbed by the moniker, and began to answer Senate calls as "Cocaine Mitch." After Blankenship lost his primary race, an official campaign account for McConnell posted a photoshopped picture of McConnell surrounded by a cloud of cocaine dust with the accompanying text, "Thanks for playing, Don." The picture was based on promotional materials for the Netflix TV show Narcos.

==== Racism controversy ====
When asked if Blankenship's rhetoric in the "China Family" political ad was racist, McConnell suggested that his answer would depend on the results of the Republican primary election. When pressed on the ad's alleged racism, Blankenship said that his ad was not racist because the Chinese are not a race. He said, "Races are Negro, White Caucasian, Hispanic, and Asian."

== Personal life ==
Blankenship has two children. He was profiled in a 2005 West Virginia Public Broadcasting documentary, The Kingmaker.

Party political offices
Preceded by Darrell Castle	Constitution nominee for President of the United States; 2020	Most recent
