= 2026 United States House of Representatives elections in West Virginia =

- November 3, 2026

Both West Virginia seats to the United States House of Representatives
	Majority party	Minority party
Party	Republican	Democratic
Last election	2	0
Seats won	2	0
Seat change	Steady	Steady
Popular vote	263,196	181,320
Percentage	58.30%	40.17%
Swing	▼10.37%	▲12.41%

Republican
50–60%
60–70%
70–80%
80–90%
Democratic
40–50%
50–60%
60–70%

The 2026 United States House of Representatives elections in West Virginia were held on November 3, 2026, to elect the 2 U.S. representatives from the State of West Virginia, one from each of the state's congressional districts. The elections coincided with other elections to the House of Representatives, elections to the United States Senate, and various state and local elections. The primary elections took place on May 12, 2026.

== District 1 ==
2026 West Virginia's 1st congressional district election
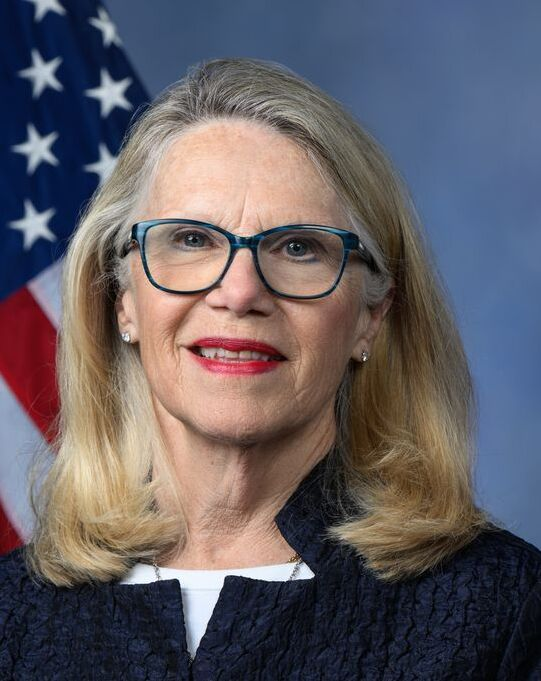

Nominee	Carol Miller	Vince George
Party	Republican	Democratic
Popular vote	119,087	82,705
Percentage	57.1%	39.6%
- County results Miller: 50–60% 60–70% 70–80% George: 40–50% 50–60%
U.S. Representative before election
Carol Miller
Republican
Elected U.S. Representative
Carol Miller
Republican

The 1st congressional district of West Virginia encompasses the southern portion of the state, including Charleston and Huntington, as well as the smaller cities of Beckley, Bluefield, Lewisburg, Princeton, and White Sulphur Springs. The incumbent is Republican Carol Miller, who was re-elected with 66.4% of the vote in 2024.

=== Republican primary ===
==== Nominee ====
- Carol Miller, incumbent U.S. representative

==== Eliminated in primary ====
- Larry Jackson, businessman

==== Disqualified ====
- Abel Clendenen
- Derrick Evans, former state delegate from the 19th district (2020-2021), pardoned January 6th rioter, and candidate for this district in 2024
- Dave Sartin, paramedic
- Gavin Solomon, businessman from New York

==== Endorsements ====
Carol Miller

Executive branch officials

- Donald Trump, 45th and 47th president of the United States (2017–2021, 2025–present)

Organizations

- ClearPath Foundation
- Maggie's List
- West Virginia Chamber of Commerce

==== Fundraising ====
Campaign finance reports as of April 22, 2026
Candidate	Raised	Spent	Cash on hand
Derrick Evans (R)	$1,215,522	$1,171,562	$104,891
Larry Jackson (R)	$102,110	$72,175	$23,935
Carol Miller (R)	$1,431,576	$941,654	$729,464
Source: Federal Election Commission

==== Results ====
Results by county Miller: 60–70%; 70–80%; 80–90%; Jackson: 50–60%

Results by precinct Miller: 50–60%; 60–70%; 70–80%; 80–90%; >90%; Jackson: 50–60%; 60–70%; 70–80%; 80–90%; >90%; Tie: 50%; No Votes

Republican primary results
Party	Candidate	Votes	%
Republican	Carol Miller (incumbent)	40,493	72.0
Republican	Larry Jackson	15,710	28.0
Total votes		56,203	100.0

=== Democratic primary ===
==== Nominee ====
- Vince George, retired public policy analyst

==== Eliminated in primary ====
- Brit Aguirre, massage therapist

==== Endorsements ====
Brit Aguirre

Organizations

- National Organization for Women PAC
- Track AIPAC

==== Fundraising ====
Campaign finance reports as of April 22, 2026
Candidate	Raised	Spent	Cash on hand
Brit Aguirre (D)	$164,893	$157,426	$7,467
Vince George (D)	$256,235	$0	$256,235
Source: Federal Election Commission

==== Results ====
Results by county George: 50–60%; 60–70%; Aguirre: 50–60%; 60–70%; 70–80%; 80–90%; Tie: 50%

Results by precinct George: 50–60%; 60–70%; 70–80%; 80–90%; >90%; Aguirre: 50–60%; 60–70%; 70–80%; 80–90%; >90%; Tie: 50%; No Votes

Democratic primary results
Party	Candidate	Votes	%
Democratic	Vince George	23,503	53.0
Democratic	Brit Aguirre	20,880	47.0
Total votes		44,383	100.0

=== Constitution party ===
==== Nominee ====
- Belinda Fox-Spencer, businesswoman, pro-Life activist, and independent candidate for West Virginia's 3rd congressional district in 2020, and candidate for this district in 2022

=== Independents ===
==== Disqualified ====
- Isaiah Rucker, MAGA activist

=== General election ===
==== Predictions ====
Source	Ranking	As of
Decision Desk HQ	Safe R	July 14, 2026
The Cook Political Report	Solid R	February 6, 2025
Inside Elections	Solid R	March 7, 2025
Sabato's Crystal Ball	Safe R	April 10, 2025

==== Post-primary endorsements ====
Vince George

Organizations

- Progressive Democrats of America - West Virginia

==== Fundraising ====
Campaign finance reports as of October 14, 2026
Candidate	Raised	Spent	Cash on hand
Carol Miller (R)	$2,036,643	$1,771,149	$505,035
Vince George (D)	$311,586	$133,982	$3,138
Belinda Fox-Spencer (C)	$0	$0	$0
Source: Federal Election Commission

==== Results ====
2026 West Virginia's 1st congressional district election
Party	Candidate	Votes	%	±%
Republican	Carol Miller (incumbent)			
Democratic	Vince George			
Constitution	Belinda Fox-Spencer			
Total votes				

== District 2 ==
2026 West Virginia's 2nd congressional district election
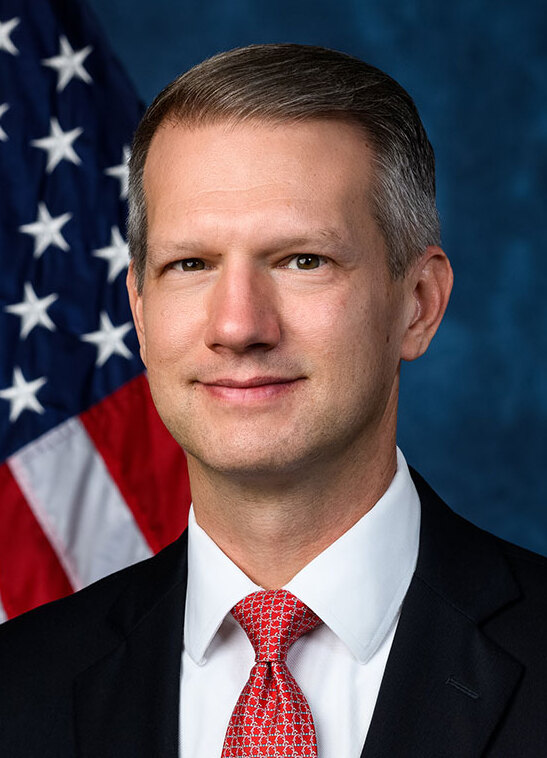

Nominee	Riley Moore	Ace Parsi
Party	Republican	Democratic
Popular vote	144,109	98,615
Percentage	59.4%	40.6%
- County results Moore: 50–60% 60–70% 70–80% 80–90% Parsi: 50–60% 60–70%
U.S. Representative before election
Riley Moore
Republican
Elected U.S. Representative
Riley Moore
Republican

The 2nd district encompasses the industrial areas of the northern Panhandle including Wheeling, Fairmont, Clarksburg, Morgantown and Parkersburg, as well as the eastern Panhandle. The incumbent is Republican Riley Moore, who was elected with 70.8% of the vote in 2024.

=== Republican primary ===
==== Nominee ====
- Riley Moore, incumbent U.S. representative

==== Endorsements ====
Riley Moore

Executive branch officials

- Donald Trump, 45th and 47th president of the United States (2017–2021, 2025–present)

Organizations

- West Virginia Chamber of Commerce

==== Fundraising ====
Campaign finance reports as of April 22, 2026
Candidate	Raised	Spent	Cash on hand
Riley Moore (R)	$1,133,937	$571,785	$685,114
Source: Federal Election Commission

==== Results ====
Republican primary results
Party	Candidate	Votes	%
Republican	Riley Moore (incumbent)	48,782	100.0
Total votes		48,782	100.0

=== Democratic primary ===
==== Nominee ====
- Ace Parsi, political organizer

==== Eliminated in primary ====
- Stephanie Spears Tomana, teacher and nominee for West Virginia House of Delegates District 75 in 2022 and 2024
- Steven Wendelin, retired U.S. Navy commander and nominee for this district in 2024

==== Disqualified ====
- Lillyauna Hershman

==== Endorsements ====
Steven Wendelin

Organizations

- National Organization for Women PAC

==== Fundraising ====
Campaign finance reports as of April 22, 2026
Candidate	Raised	Spent	Cash on hand
Ace Parsi (D)	$76,264	$53,200	$23,063
Stephanie Spears Tomana (D)	$15,837	$11,757	$4,080
Steven Wendelin (D)	$17,643	$13,153	$4,750
Source: Federal Election Commission

==== Results ====
Results by county Parsi: 30–40%; 40–50%; 50–60%; 60–70%; Spears Tomana: 30–40%; 40–50%; 50–60%; 70–80%; Wendelin: 40–50%; 60–70%; 80–90%

Results by precinct Parsi: 30–40%; 40–50%; 50–60%; 60–70%; 70–80%; 80–90%; >90%; Spears Tomana: 30–40%; 40–50%; 50–60%; 60–70%; 70–80%; 80–90%; >90%; Wendelin: 30–40%; 40–50%; 50–60%; 60–70%; 70–80%; 80–90%; >90%; Tie: 30–40%; 40–50%; No Votes

Democratic primary results
Party	Candidate	Votes	%
Democratic	Ace Parsi	17,811	39.8
Democratic	Stephanie Spears Tomana	16,961	37.9
Democratic	Steven Wendelin	10,019	22.4
Total votes		44,791	100.0

=== Independents ===
==== Disqualified ====
- Pat Carney
- Chris Whitcomb, business consultant

=== General election ===
==== Predictions ====
Source	Ranking	As of
Decision Desk HQ	Safe R	July 14, 2026
The Cook Political Report	Solid R	February 6, 2025
Inside Elections	Solid R	March 7, 2025
Sabato's Crystal Ball	Safe R	April 10, 2025

==== Post-primary endorsements ====
Riley Moore (R)

Labor unions

- United Mine Workers of America COMPAC

Organizations

- Bull Moose Project
Ace Parsi (D)

Labor unions

- National Education Association

Organizations

- New American Leaders Action Fund

==== Fundraising ====
Campaign finance reports as of October 14, 2026
Candidate	Raised	Spent	Cash on hand
Riley Moore (R)	$1,617,727	$1,160,065	$580,625
Ace Parsi (D)	$276,741	$187,965	$88,775
Source: Federal Election Commission

==== Results ====
2026 West Virginia's 2nd congressional district election
Party	Candidate	Votes	%	±%
Republican	Riley Moore (incumbent)			
Democratic	Ace Parsi			
Total votes				
