= 2024 United States Senate election in West Virginia =

- November 5, 2024
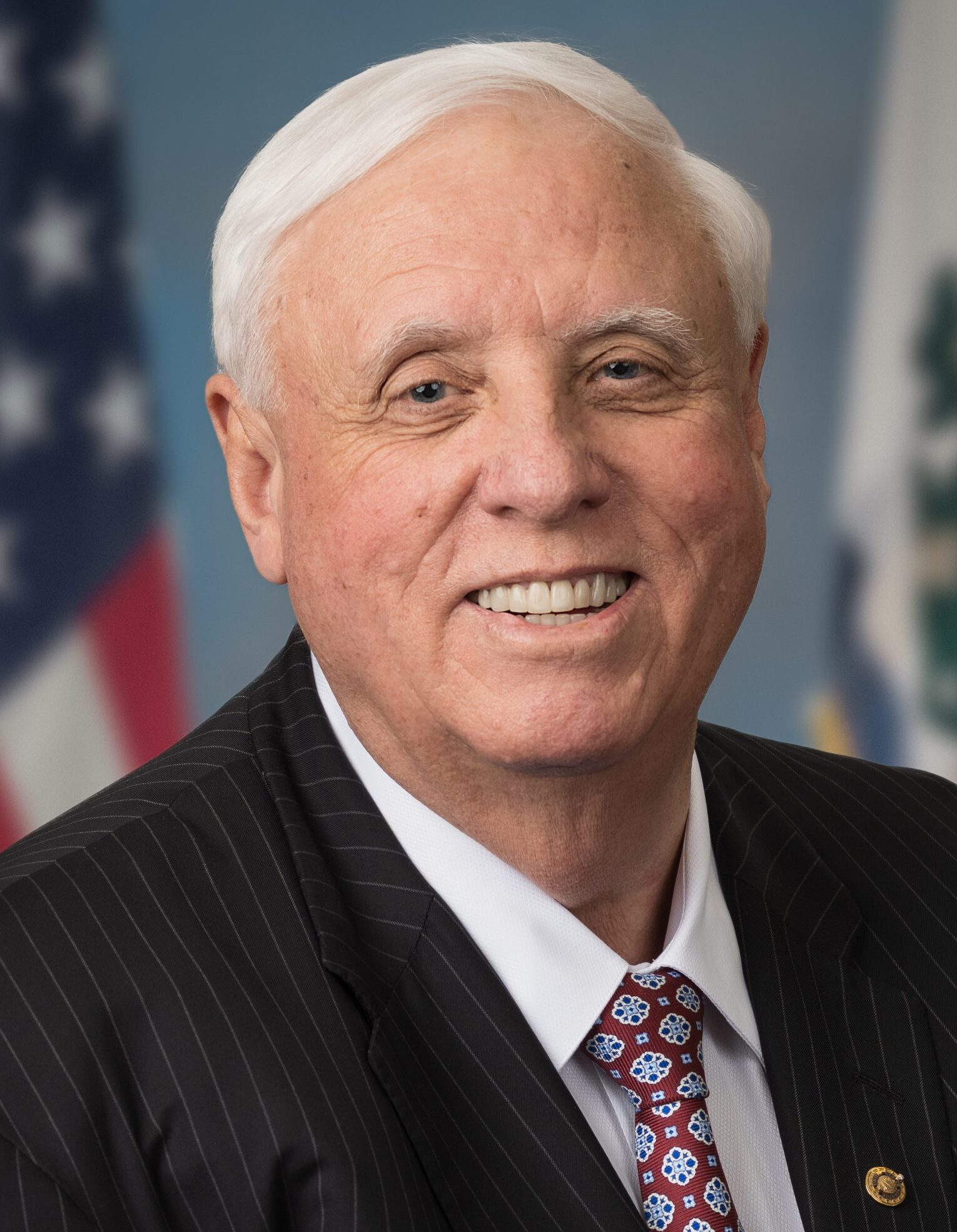

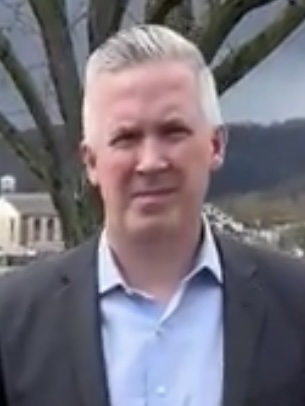
Nominee	Jim Justice	Glenn Elliott
Party	Republican	Democratic
Popular vote	514,079	207,548
Percentage	68.75%	27.76%
- Justice: 50–60% 60–70% 70–80% 80–90%
U.S. senator before election
Joe Manchin
Independent
Elected U.S. senator
Jim Justice
Republican

The 2024 United States Senate election in West Virginia was held on November 5, 2024, to elect a member of the United States Senate to represent the State of West Virginia. Republican governor Jim Justice won his first term in office, defeating Democratic Wheeling mayor Glenn Elliott. He succeeded independent incumbent Joe Manchin, who did not seek a third full term.

Manchin, a Democrat until his final year in the Senate, announced he would not run for re-election shortly before switching to independent. He endorsed Elliott, who won the Democratic nomination with 45% of the vote against political activist Zach Shrewsbury and businessman Don Blankenship. Justice won the Republican nomination with 62% of the vote against Congressman Alex Mooney.

Due to West Virginia's heavy Republican lean, the absence of Manchin, Justice's personal popularity, and being held concurrently with a presidential race in a state in which Donald Trump was expected to win in a landslide, a Republican pickup for this seat was considered a foregone conclusion in 2024. (Note: Attributed to multiple sources:) Justice was sworn in as a Senator on January 14, 2025, giving elected Republicans control of both of West Virginia’s Senate seats for the first time since 1931 and giving the state an entirely Republican congressional delegation for the first time since 1923. (Note: Republicans held both of West Virginia's Senate seats in 1958 when Republican John Hoblitzell was appointed to continue the term of Democrat Matthew M. Neely before losing his bid to finish Neely's term in a special election the same year.) This was the first time since the 1956 special election that a Republican won West Virginia's Class I Senate Seat.

== Background ==
Manchin saw electoral success through the 2010s, positioning himself as a centrist to conservative Democrat with strong ties to West Virginia, which is now considered a deeply red state at the federal and state levels.

The Republican Party identified this contest as a top priority in the 2024 election cycle. Amongst the Republicans who ran for this seat were Congressman Alex Mooney and Governor Jim Justice.

Due to the state's heavy partisan lean, the narrow margin by which Manchin was re-elected in 2018, and a likely strong Republican presidential performance on the same ballot, Republicans were favored to win this seat even if Manchin sought re-election. After Justice announced his bid for the seat in April 2023, Elections Daily labeled this race as "Safe Republican" due to his strong polling advantage against Manchin. After Manchin announced his retirement, all major outlets rated this seat as an expected easy flip to GOP control. While some Democratic sources hoped that a primary victory by Don Blankenship would spur Manchin to run as an independent, Manchin himself described that notion as a "long, long, long-shot scenario" that ended when Blankenship lost the primary.

== Democratic primary ==
=== Candidates ===
==== Nominee ====
- Glenn Elliott, former mayor of Wheeling (2016–2024)

==== Eliminated in primary ====
- Don Blankenship, former CEO of Massey Energy, Republican candidate for U.S. Senate in 2018, and Constitution nominee for president in 2020
- Zach Shrewsbury, political organizer

==== Declined ====
- Joe Manchin, incumbent U.S. senator (endorsed Elliott)

=== Endorsements ===
Glenn Elliott

U.S. senators

- Joe Manchin, U.S. senator from West Virginia (2010–2025) (Independent)

Local officials

- Amy Shuler Goodwin, mayor of Charleston (2019–present)

Labor Unions

- West Virginia AFL–CIO
- United Auto Workers
- Communications Workers of America
Zach Shrewsbury

State legislators

- Anitra Hamilton, state delegate (2023–present)
- Evan Hansen, state delegate (2018–present)
- Danielle Walker, former state delegate (2018–2023)

Individuals

- Howie Klein, former president of Reprise Records (1989–2001) and adjunct professor at McGill University
- Heather Digby Parton, political blogger

Organizations

- Peace Action
- Progressive Democrats of America

=== Fundraising ===
Campaign finance reports as of April 24, 2024
Candidate	Raised	Spent	Cash on hand
Zachary Shrewsbury (D)	$295,678	$238,895	$56,782
Glenn Elliott (D)	$125,407	$60,071	$65,335
Don Blankenship (D)	$1,000	$0	$1,085
Source: Federal Election Commission

=== Results ===
Results by county: Elliott: 30–40%; 40–50%; 50–60%; 60–70%; 70–80%; 80–90%; Shrewsbury: 30–40%; 40–50%; 50–60%; 60–70%; 70–80%; Blankenship: 30–40%; 40–50%; 50–60%; Tie: 30–40%

Democratic primary results
Party	Candidate	Votes	%
Democratic	Glenn Elliott	46,176	45.40%
Democratic	Zach Shrewsbury	36,754	36.14%
Democratic	Don Blankenship	18,778	18.46%
Total votes		101,708	100.00%

== Republican primary ==
=== Candidates ===
==== Nominee ====
- Jim Justice, governor of West Virginia (2017–2025)

==== Eliminated in primary ====
- Bryan Bird, pastor
- Zane Lawhorn, optometrist and perennial candidate
- Don Lindsay
- Bryan McKinney, sales manager
- Janet McNulty, IT professional
- Alex Mooney, U.S. representative for West Virginia's 2nd congressional district (2015–2025)

==== Withdrew ====
- Chris Rose, coal miner (ran for state senate)

==== Declined ====
- Carol Miller, U.S. representative for West Virginia's 1st congressional district (2019–present) (running for re-election)
- Patrick Morrisey, West Virginia Attorney General (2013–2025) and nominee for U.S. Senate in 2018 (running for governor)

=== Endorsements ===
Jim Justice

Executive branch officials

- Donald Trump, former president of the United States (2017–2021)

U.S. senators

- Marsha Blackburn, Tennessee (2019–present)
- Mitch McConnell, Senate minority leader (2021–2025) from Kentucky (1985–present)
- Shelley Moore Capito, West Virginia (2015–present)
- Lindsey Graham, South Carolina (2003–present)
- Tom Cotton, Arkansas (2015–present)

U.S. representatives

- David McKinley, WV-01 (2011–2023)

State legislators

- Moore Capito, state delegate (2016–2023)

Individuals

- Cathy Justice, educator and First Lady of West Virginia (2017–2025) (candidate’s wife)

Organizations

- BIPAC
- National Republican Senatorial Committee
- Republican Main Street Partnership PAC
- West Virginia Coal Association
Alex Mooney

U.S. senators

- Ted Cruz, Texas (2013–present)
- Rand Paul, Kentucky (2011–present)
- Mike Lee, Utah (2011–present)
- Jim DeMint, former South Carolina (2005–2013)

U.S. representatives

- Jim Jordan, OH-04 (2007–present)

Statewide officials

- Riley Moore, West Virginia state treasurer (2021–2025)
- Craig Blair, lieutenant governor of West Virginia (2021–2025)

State legislators

- Eric Householder, Majority Leader of the West Virginia House of Delegates (2023–2025)
- Rollan Roberts, state senator from the 9th district (2019–present)
- Chuck Horst, state delegate from the 62nd district (2020–present)
- Patricia Rucker, state senator from the 16th district (2016–present)
- Robert Karnes, state senator from the 11th district (2014-2018, 2020–2024)
- Chris Pritt, state delegate from the 36th district (2020–2024)
- Pat McGeehan, state delegate from the 1st district (2014–present)

Organizations

- Citizens United Political Victory Fund
- Club for Growth
- Conservative Political Action Conference (CPAC)
- Eagle Forum
- Republican Liberty Caucus
- Senate Conservatives Fund
- West Virginia Republican Assembly

=== Fundraising ===
Campaign finance reports as of April 24, 2024
Candidate	Raised	Spent	Cash on hand
Jim Justice (R)	$2,956,027	$2,024,749	$931,451
Alex Mooney (R)	$3,266,887	$2,629,525	$637,362
Source: Federal Election Commission

=== Polling ===
Poll source	Date(s) administered	Sample size (Note: Key: A – all adults RV – registered voters LV – likely voters V – unclear)	Margin of error	Jim Justice	Alex Mooney	Other	Undecided
Emerson College	May 2–5, 2024	558 (LV)	± 4.1%	60%	30%	10% (Note: Zane Lawhorn with 3%; Bryan Bird, Bryan McKinney, and Janet McNulty with 2%; Don Lindsay with 1%)	–
Research America (Note: Poll sponsored by West Virginia MetroNews and The Health Plan)	April 24 – May 1, 2024	407 (LV)	± 4.9%	67%	23%	7%	3%
Osage Research (R) (Note: Poll sponsored by Mooney's campaign)	April 22–24, 2024	400(LV)	± 4.9%	49%	35%	5%	11%
NMB Research (R)	April 20–22, 2024	500(LV)	± 4.38%	60%	24%	–	16%
Research America	April 3–9, 2024	400 (LV)	± 4.9%	66%	24%	4%	6%
Emerson College (Note: Poll sponsored by WOWK-TV)	March 19–21, 2024	735 (LV)	± 3.6%	54%	17%	1%	22%
American Pulse Research & Polling (R) (Note: Poll sponsored by WMOV)	November 13–14, 2023	414 (LV)	± 4.8%	56%	20%	3% (Note: Bryan McKinney with 2%; Zane Lawhorn with 1%)	22%
Fabrizio, Lee and Associates (R) (Note: Poll sponsored by Justice's campaign)	September 11–13, 2023	600 (LV)	± 4.0%	62%	23%	–	15%
Research America	August 16–26, 2023	402 (RV)	± 4.9%	58%	26%	–	16%
Orion Strategies (Note: Poll sponsored by the West Virginia Chamber of Commerce)	June 17–20, 2023	651 (LV)	± 6.0%	56%	19%	9%	16%
East Carolina University	May 22–23, 2023	796 (RV)	± 3.7%	53%	12%	–	35%
co/efficient (R)	April 24–25, 2023	753 (LV)	± 3.5%	45%	17%	–	38%

Hypothetical polling

Poll source	Date(s) administered	Sample size	Margin of error	Jim Justice	Alex Mooney	Patrick Morrisey	Undecided
National Public Affairs (R)	March 14–17, 2023	360 (LV)	± 5.2%	43%	21%	10%	24%
Tarrance Group (R) (Note: Poll sponsored by the Senate Leadership Fund, which supports Republican candidates)	February 5–7, 2023	609 (LV) (Note: Oversample of 100 likely Republican primary voters)	± 4.1%	53%	16%	21%	8%

=== Results ===
Results by county: Justice: 40–50%; 50–60%; 60–70%; 70–80%; Mooney: 40–50%; 60–70%

Republican primary results
Party	Candidate	Votes	%
Republican	Jim Justice	138,307	61.84%
Republican	Alex Mooney	59,348	26.54%
Republican	Bryan Bird	7,001	3.13%
Republican	Bryan McKinney	6,573	2.94%
Republican	Zane Lawhorn	4,517	2.02%
Republican	Janet McNulty	4,404	1.97%
Republican	Don Lindsay	3,503	1.57%
Total votes		223,653	100.00%

== Independents ==
=== Declined ===
- Joe Manchin, incumbent U.S. senator (endorsed Elliott)

== General election ==
=== Predictions ===
Source	Ranking	As of
The Cook Political Report	Solid R (flip)	May 17, 2024
Inside Elections	Solid R (flip)	May 9, 2024
Sabato's Crystal Ball	Safe R (flip)	April 17, 2024
Decision Desk HQ/The Hill	Safe R (flip)	June 8, 2024
Elections Daily	Safe R (flip)	May 4, 2023
CNalysis	Solid R (flip)	November 21, 2023
RealClearPolitics	Solid R (flip)	August 5, 2024
Split Ticket	Safe R (flip)	October 23, 2024
538	Solid R (flip)	October 23, 2024

=== Post-primary endorsements ===
Glenn Elliott (D)

U.S. senators

- John Fetterman, U.S. senator from Pennsylvania (2023–present)
Jim Justice (R)

Organizations

- National Right to Life Committee

=== Fundraising ===
Campaign finance reports as of June 30, 2024
Candidate	Raised	Spent	Cash on hand
Glenn Elliott (D)	$252,262	$183,127	$69,135
Jim Justice (R)	$3,680,408	$2,881,158	$799,423
Source: Federal Election Commission

=== Polling ===
Poll source	Date(s) administered	Sample size	Margin of error	Glenn Elliott (D)	Jim Justice (R)	Undecided
Research America (Note: Poll sponsored by West Virginia MetroNews)	August 21–27, 2024	400 (RV)	± 4.9%	28%	62%	10% (Note: "Someone else" with 5%)
Kaplan Strategies	June 4, 2024	464 (RV)	± 4.6%	27%	60%	13%

Hypothetical polling

Joe Manchin vs. Jim Justice

Poll source	Date(s) administered	Sample size	Margin of error	Joe Manchin (D)	Jim Justice (R)	Other	Undecided
Emerson College	October 1–4, 2023	539 (RV)	± 4.2%	28%	41%	–	31%
Research America	August 16–26, 2023	402 (RV)	± 4.9%	38%	51%	–	11%
East Carolina University	May 22–23, 2023	957 (RV)	± 3.7%	32%	54%	1%	13%
co/efficient (R)	April 24–25, 2023	974 (LV)	± 3.0%	29%	43%	–	28%
Tarrance Group (R)	February 5–7, 2023	609 (LRV)	± 4.1%	42%	52%	–	5%
Triton Polling & Research (R)	August 24–26, 2022	762 (RV)	± 3.5%	32%	47%	–	21%
Triton Polling & Research (R)	January 17–20, 2022	783 (LV)	± 3.5%	41%	37%	–	22%

Joe Manchin vs. Alex Mooney

Poll source	Date(s) administered	Sample size	Margin of error	Joe Manchin (D)	Alex Mooney (R)	Other	Undecided
Emerson College	October 1–4, 2023	539 (RV)	± 4.2%	37%	31%	31%	–
Research America	August 16–26, 2023	402 (RV)	± 4.9%	45%	41%	14%	–
East Carolina University	May 22–23, 2023	957 (RV)	± 3.7%	40%	41%	1%	18%
co/efficient (R)	April 24–25, 2023	974 (LV)	± 3.0%	36%	30%	–	34%
Tarrance Group (R)	February 5–7, 2023	609 (LRV)	± 4.1%	55%	40%	–	5%
Triton Polling & Research (R)	August 24–26, 2022	762 (RV)	± 3.5%	38%	45%	12%	5%
Triton Polling & Research (R)	January 17–20, 2022	783 (LV)	± 3.5%	49%	28%	16%	7%

Joe Manchin vs. Patrick Morrisey

Poll source	Date(s) administered	Sample size	Margin of error	Joe Manchin (D)	Patrick Morrisey (R)	Other	Undecided
Tarrance Group (R)	February 5–7, 2023	609 (LRV)	± 4.1%	52%	42%	–	6%
Triton Polling & Research (R)	August 24–26, 2022	762 (RV)	± 3.5%	36%	50%	9%	5%
Triton Polling & Research (R)	January 17–20, 2022	783 (LV)	± 3.5%	50%	29%	7%	16%

Joe Manchin as an Independent vs. Jim Justice

Poll source	Date(s) administered	Sample size	Margin of error	Joe Manchin (I)	Jim Justice (R)	Undecided
Tarrance Group (R)	September 24–26, 2023	500 (LV)	± 4.5%	43%	49%	8%

=== Results ===
2024 United States Senate election in West Virginia
Party	Candidate	Votes	%	±%
Republican	Jim Justice	514,079	68.75%	+22.49%
Democratic	Glenn Elliott	207,548	27.76%	−21.81%
Libertarian	David Moran	26,075	3.49%	−0.68%
Write-in		15	0.00%	N/A
Total votes		747,717	100.00%	N/A
Republican gain from Independent				

==== By county ====
County	Glenn Elliott Democratic		Jim Justice Republican		David Moran Libertarian		Margin		Total
County	#	%	#	%	#	%	#	%	Total
Barbour	1,069	16.95%	4,963	78.72%	273	4.33%	3,894	61.76%	6,305
Berkeley	16,740	30.49%	35,870	65.34%	2,285	4.16%	19,130	34.85%	54,895
Boone	1,826	22.86%	5,965	74.67%	197	2.47%	4,139	51.82%	7,988
Braxton	1,255	23.99%	3,812	72.86%	165	3.15%	2,557	48.87%	5,232
Brooke	2,684	27.72%	6,857	70.82%	141	1.46%	4,173	43.10%	9,682
Cabell	12,093	34.84%	21,486	61.90%	1,131	3.26%	9,393	27.06%	34,710
Calhoun	484	16.96%	2,293	80.34%	77	2.70%	1,809	63.38%	2,854
Clay	594	18.72%	2,479	78.13%	100	3.15%	1,885	59.41%	3,173
Doddridge	379	13.06%	2,374	81.78%	150	5.17%	1,995	68.72%	2,903
Fayette	4,512	29.65%	10,147	66.69%	557	3.66%	5,635	37.03%	15,216
Gilmer	481	20.81%	1,763	76.29%	67	2.90%	1,282	55.47%	2,311
Grant	547	10.14%	4,647	86.17%	199	3.69%	4,100	76.02%	5,393
Greenbrier	4,515	30.69%	9,676	65.77%	521	3.54%	5,161	35.08%	14,712
Hampshire	1,777	17.36%	8,120	79.31%	341	3.33%	6,343	61.96%	10,238
Hancock	3,277	25.49%	9,334	72.59%	247	1.92%	6,057	47.11%	12,858
Hardy	1,303	20.66%	4,798	76.07%	206	3.27%	3,495	55.41%	6,307
Harrison	7,508	25.85%	20,396	70.21%	1,145	3.94%	12,888	44.37%	29,049
Jackson	2,669	21.14%	9,492	75.17%	466	3.69%	6,823	54.04%	12,627
Jefferson	11,265	39.31%	16,509	57.61%	884	3.08%	5,244	18.30%	28,658
Kanawha	29,195	39.65%	42,331	57.49%	2,103	2.86%	13,136	17.84%	73,629
Lewis	1,239	17.69%	5,467	78.06%	298	4.25%	4,228	60.37%	7,004
Lincoln	1,283	18.22%	5,555	78.87%	205	2.91%	4,272	60.66%	7,043
Logan	1,874	16.98%	8,916	80.79%	246	2.23%	7,042	63.81%	11,036
Marion	7,834	32.22%	15,406	63.36%	1,074	4.42%	7,572	31.14%	24,314
Marshall	4,027	30.61%	8,902	67.68%	225	1.71%	4,875	37.06%	13,154
Mason	2,156	20.73%	7,890	75.85%	356	3.42%	5,734	55.12%	10,402
McDowell	898	17.42%	4,121	79.94%	136	2.64%	3,223	62.52%	5,155
Mercer	4,306	18.66%	18,120	78.51%	653	2.83%	13,814	59.86%	23,079
Mineral	2,207	17.31%	10,157	79.67%	385	3.02%	7,950	62.36%	12,749
Mingo	1,085	13.24%	6,940	84.69%	170	2.07%	5,855	71.45%	8,195
Monongalia	18,272	44.65%	20,874	51.00%	1,780	4.35%	2,602	6.36%	40,926
Monroe	1,235	19.80%	4,804	77.01%	199	3.19%	3,569	57.21%	6,238
Morgan	1,840	20.85%	6,662	75.49%	323	3.66%	4,822	54.64%	8,825
Nicholas	2,006	20.34%	7,538	76.42%	320	3.24%	5,532	56.08%	9,864
Ohio	7,599	40.80%	10,750	57.72%	275	1.48%	3,151	16.92%	18,624
Pendleton	614	18.31%	2,658	79.27%	81	2.42%	2,044	60.96%	3,353
Pleasants	641	19.40%	2,569	77.75%	94	2.85%	1,928	58.35%	3,304
Pocahontas	1,014	26.66%	2,649	69.64%	141	3.71%	1,635	42.98%	3,804
Preston	2,477	17.50%	9,988	70.58%	1,687	11.92%	7,511	53.07%	14,152
Putnam	6,841	25.38%	19,184	71.17%	930	3.45%	12,343	45.79%	26,955
Raleigh	6,970	23.24%	21,796	72.68%	1,225	4.08%	14,826	49.43%	29,991
Randolph	2,881	25.23%	8,107	70.99%	432	3.78%	5,226	45.76%	11,420
Ritchie	547	13.87%	3,278	83.11%	119	3.02%	2,731	69.24%	3,944
Roane	1,190	21.87%	4,100	75.35%	151	2.78%	2,910	53.48%	5,441
Summers	1,267	24.67%	3,708	72.21%	160	3.12%	2,441	47.54%	5,135
Taylor	1,518	21.09%	5,344	74.23%	337	4.68%	3,826	53.15%	7,199
Tucker	849	23.51%	2,544	70.45%	218	6.04%	1,695	46.94%	3,611
Tyler	643	18.10%	2,795	78.67%	115	3.24%	2,152	60.57%	3,553
Upshur	1,879	19.39%	7,437	76.75%	374	3.86%	5,558	57.36%	9,690
Wayne	3,392	22.25%	11,416	74.89%	435	2.85%	8,024	52.64%	15,243
Webster	541	18.40%	2,331	79.26%	69	2.35%	1,790	60.86%	2,941
Wetzel	1,494	24.58%	4,469	73.54%	114	1.88%	2,975	48.96%	6,077
Wirt	419	16.63%	2,001	79.40%	100	3.97%	1,582	62.78%	2,520
Wood	9,381	25.60%	26,084	71.18%	1,178	3.21%	16,703	45.58%	36,643
Wyoming	956	12.96%	6,207	84.13%	215	2.91%	5,251	71.17%	7,378
Totals	207,548	27.76%	514,079	68.75%	26,075	3.49%	306,531	41.00%	747,702

Counties that flipped from Democratic to Republican

- Brooke (largest borough: Wellsburg)
- Boone (largest city: Madison)
- Braxton (largest town: Sutton)
- Cabell (largest city: Huntington)
- Fayette (largest city: Fayetteville)
- Gilmer (largest city: Glenville)
- Greenbrier (largest city: Lewisburg)
- Jefferson (largest city: Charles Town)
- Harrison (largest city: Clarksburg)
- Kanawha (largest city: Charleston)
- Lincoln (largest city: Hamlin)
- Marshall (largest city: Moundsville)
- Mason (largest city: Point Pleasant)
- Marion (largest city: Fairmont)
- McDowell (largest city: Welch)
- Mineral (largest municipality: Keyser)
- Monongalia (largest city: Morgantown)
- Ohio (largest city: Wheeling)
- Putnam (largest municipality: Hurricane)
- Randolph (largest city: Elkins)
- Roane (largest city: Spencer)
- Summers (largest city: Hinton)
- Wayne (largest city: Kenova)
- Wetzel (largest city: New Martinsville)
- Wood (largest municipality: Parkersburg)

==== By congressional district ====
Justice won both congressional districts.

District	Elliott	Justice	Representative
1st	27%	70%	Carol Miller
2nd	29%	68%	Alex Mooney (118th Congress)
2nd	29%	68%	Riley Moore (119th Congress)

== Notes ==
Partisan clients
