= 2026 United States Senate election in West Virginia =

- November 3, 2026
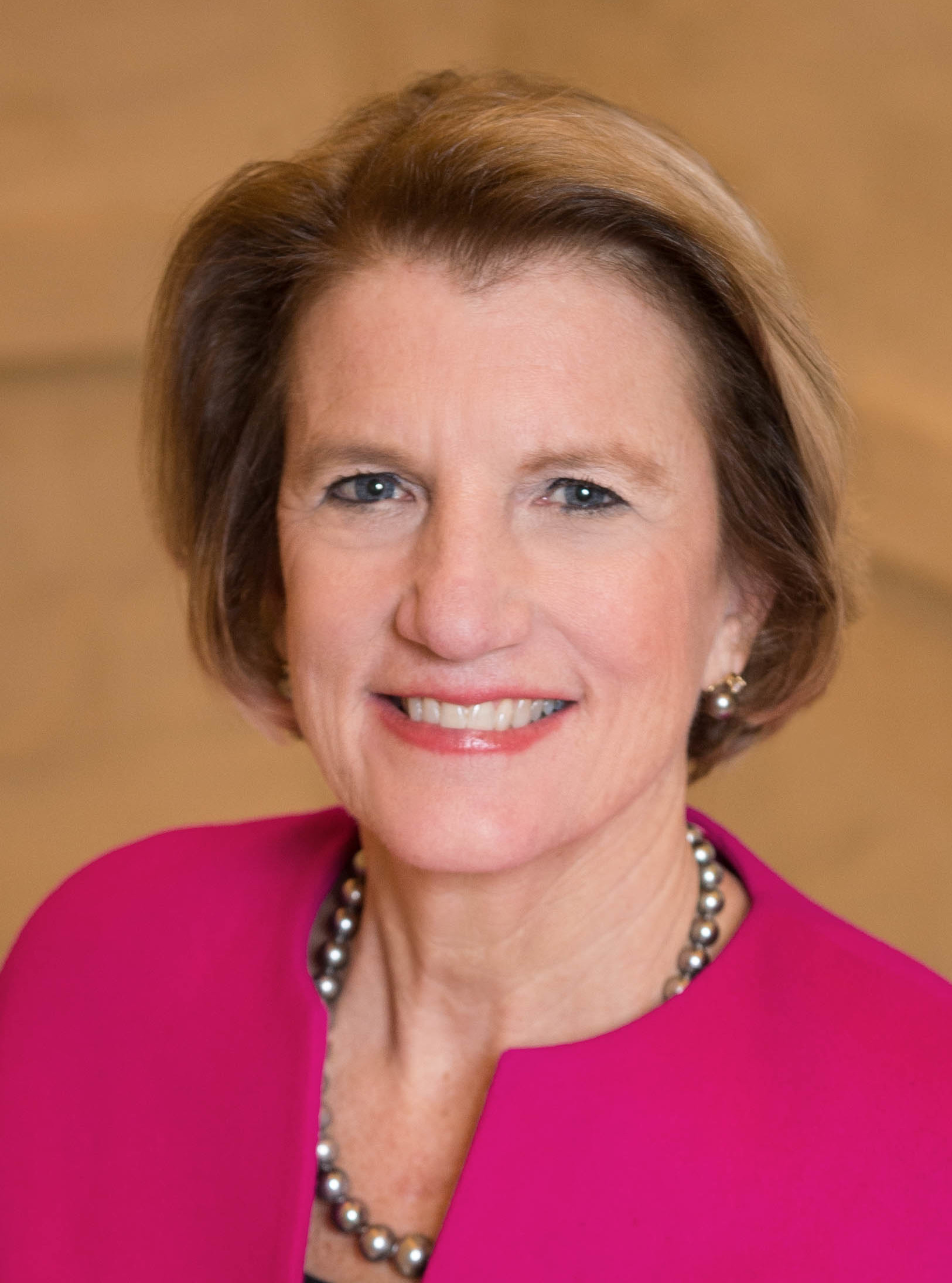

Nominee	Shelley Moore Capito	Rachel Fetty Anderson
Party	Republican	Democratic
Popular vote	266,772	173,656
Percentage	58.33%	37.91%
- Capito: 40–50% 50–60% 60–70% 70–80% 80–90% Anderson: 40–50% 50–60%
U.S. senator before election
Shelley Moore Capito
Republican
Elected U.S. senator
Shelley Moore Capito
Republican

The 2026 United States Senate election in West Virginia was held on November 3, 2026, to elect a member of the United States Senate to represent the state of West Virginia. Republican incumbent Shelley Moore Capito was re-elected to a third term, defeating Democratic former Morgantown councilwoman Rachel Fetty Anderson.

Primary elections were held on May 12. In the Republican primary, Capito won the nomination with 66.5% of the vote over state senator Tom Willis. Fetty Anderson won the Democratic nomination with 33.2% of the vote over a field of candidates that included former state Senate president Jeff Kessler.

As expected, Capito easily won re-election; however, this was her closest Senate race since her first election in 2014. Compared to 2020 when Capito won by 43%, she was re-elected by about 20% in 2026, a decrease of about 23 percentage points. This was also the first time that Capito did not win every county in West Virginia, unlike her 2014 and 2020 victories; and the first time that a Democrat won any counties in a statewide election since the 2020 races for Attorney General, Secretary of State, State Treasurer, and Commissioner of Agriculture.

With the Democrats flipping the Senate as a result of the 2026 elections, this marks the first time since 1916 where they won a Senate majority without holding either seat in West Virginia (with Jim Justice holding the Class 1 seat).

== Republican primary ==
=== Candidates ===
==== Nominee ====
- Shelley Moore Capito, incumbent U.S. senator (2015–present)

==== Eliminated in primary ====
- Alex Gaaserud, third party logistics executive and candidate for West Virginia's 2nd congressional district in 2024
- Bryan McKinney, sales consultant and candidate for U.S. Senate in 2024
- Janet McNulty, retail worker and candidate for West Virginia House of Delegates in 2022 and U.S. Senate in 2024
- David Purkey, staff engineer
- Tom Willis, state senator from the 15th district (2024–present) and candidate for U.S. Senate in 2018

==== Withdrawn ====
- Derrick Evans, former state delegate from the 19th district (2020–2021), candidate for West Virginia's 1st congressional district in 2024, convicted participant in the January 6 United States Capitol attack (ran for U.S. House)

=== Endorsements ===
Shelley Moore Capito

Executive branch officials

- Donald Trump, president of the United States (2017–2021, 2025–present)

U.S. senators

- Jim Justice, West Virginia (2025–present)

U.S. representatives

- Carol Miller, WV-01 (2019–present)
- Riley Moore, WV-02 (2025–present)

Organizations

- AIPAC
- Maggie's List
- Log Cabin Republicans
- U.S. Chamber of Commerce
- West Virginia Chamber of Commerce
Tom Willis

Organizations

- Students for Life of America

=== Fundraising ===
Italics indicate a withdrawn candidate.

Campaign finance reports as of April 22, 2026
Candidate	Raised	Spent	Cash on hand
Derrick Evans (R)	$1,062,145	$1,001,214	$60,931
Alex Gaaserud (R)	$3,000	$1,740	$1,260
Janet McNulty (R)	$5,775	$5,775	$0
Shelley Moore Capito (R)	$5,770,883	$4,176,660	$4,064,753
Tom Willis (R)	$496,222	$439,153	$57,069
Source: Federal Election Commission

=== Results ===
Results by county Moore Capito: 40–50%; 50–60%; 60–70%; 70–80%; Willis: 40–50%

Results by precinct Moore Capito: 30–40%; 40–50%; 50–60%; 60–70%; 70–80%; 80–90%; >90%; Willis: 40–50%; 50–60%; 60–70%; 70–80%; 80–90%; >90%; McKinney: 40–50%; Purkey: 40–50%; Gaaserud: 50–60%; 60–70%; McNulty: >90%; Tie: 30–40%; 40–50%; 50%; No Votes

Republican primary
Party	Candidate	Votes	%
Republican	Shelley Moore Capito (incumbent)	80,376	66.5
Republican	Tom Willis	22,829	18.9
Republican	Bryan McKinney	5,587	4.6
Republican	David Purkey	5,040	4.2
Republican	Alex Gaaserud	4,462	3.7
Republican	Janet McNulty	2,597	2.1
Total votes		120,891	100.0

== Democratic primary ==
=== Candidates ===
==== Nominee ====
- Rachel Fetty Anderson, former Morgantown city council member

==== Eliminated in primary ====
- Thornton Cooper, attorney and nominee for Secretary of State in 2024
- Jeff Kessler, former President of the West Virginia Senate (2010–2015) from the 2nd district (1997–2017), candidate for Governor of West Virginia in 2011 and 2016, and candidate for Supreme Court of Appeals in 2018
- Rio Phillips
- Zach Shrewsbury, political organizer and candidate for U.S. Senate in 2024

==== Endorsements ====
Rachel Fetty Anderson

Organizations

- National Organization for Women PAC
- Vote Common Good
Jeff Kessler

Labor unions

- Communications Workers of America District 2-13

=== Fundraising ===
Campaign finance reports as of April 22, 2026
Candidate	Raised	Spent	Cash on hand
R. F. Anderson (D)	$22,447	$16,891	$12,552
Rio Phillips (D)	$13,776	$13,624	$152
Zach Shrewsbury (D)	$498,539	$490,416	$8,123
Source: Federal Election Commission

=== Results ===
Results by county Anderson: 60–70%; 50–60%; 40–50%; 30–40%; 20–30%; Kessler: 80–90%; 70–80%; 60–70%; 40–50%; 30–40%; 20–30%; Shrewsbury: 70–80%; 60–70%; 50–60%; 40–50%; 30–40%; Cooper: 30–40%; 20–30%; Phillips: 20–30%

Results by county Anderson: >90%; 80–90%; 70–80%; 60–70%; 50–60%; 40–50%; 30–40%; 20–30%; Kessler: >90%; 80–90%; 70–80%; 60–70%; 50–60%; 40–50%; 30–40%; 20–30%; Shrewsbury: >90%; 80–90%; 70–80%; 60–70%; 50–60%; 40–50%; 30–40%; 20–30%; Cooper: >90%; 80–90%; 70–80%; 60–70%; 50–60%; 40–50%; 30–40%; 20–30%; Phillips: 60–70%; 50–60%; 40–50%; 30–40%; 20–30%; Tie: 20–30%; 30–40%; 40–50%; 50%; No Votes

Democratic primary
Party	Candidate	Votes	%
Democratic	Rachel Fetty Anderson	30,930	33.2
Democratic	Jeff Kessler	25,228	27.0
Democratic	Zach Shrewsbury	15,076	16.2
Democratic	Thornton Cooper	11,826	12.7
Democratic	Rio Phillips	10,237	11.0
Total votes		93,297	100.0

== Other candidates ==
=== Constitution Party ===
==== Nominee ====
- S. Marshall Wilson, former Republican state delegate (2016–2020) and candidate for governor in 2020 and 2024

==== Fundraising ====
Campaign finance reports as of June 30, 2026
Candidate	Raised	Spent	Cash on hand
S. Marshall Wilson (C)	$2,420	$1,921	$499
Source: Federal Election Commission

=== Veterans Party ===
==== Disqualified ====
- Owen Nicholas Carlson

=== Write-ins ===
==== Declared ====
- Rio Phillips, cybersecurity technician (previously ran as a Democrat)

==== Fundraising ====
Campaign finance reports as of April 22, 2026
Candidate	Raised	Spent	Cash on hand
Rio Phillips (WI)	$13,776	$13,624	$152
Source: Federal Election Commission

== General election ==
=== Predictions ===
Source	Ranking	As of
The Cook Political Report	Solid R	November 2, 2026
Decision Desk HQ	Safe R	November 3, 2026
The Economist (Note: The Economist's prediction model uses unconventional terminology. For the purpose of equivalency, their "Very Likely" ratings are formatted as a "Likely" rating while "Likely" ratings are formatted as a "Lean" rating.)	Safe R	November 3, 2026
FiftyPlusOne	Safe R	November 3, 2026
Fox News	Solid R	November 1, 2026
Inside Elections	Solid R	October 29, 2026
MS NOW	Safe R	October 29, 2026
NBC News	Solid R	November 3, 2026
RealClearPolitics	Solid R	November 2, 2026
Sabato's Crystal Ball	Safe R	November 2, 2026
Silver Bulletin	Solid R	November 3, 2026
Split Ticket	Safe R	November 2, 2026

=== Post-primary endorsements ===
Shelly Moore Capito (R)

Labor unions

- United Mine Workers of America COMPAC
Rachel Fetty Anderson (D)

Organizations

- Feminist Majority Foundation PAC
- National Organization for Women

=== Fundraising ===
Campaign finance reports as of October 14, 2026
Candidate	Raised	Spent	Cash on hand
Shelley Moore Capito (R)	$7,314,563	$6,714,017	$3,071,076
Rachel Fetty Anderson (D)	$164,558	$135,873	$35,681
S. Marshall Wilson (C)	$65,287	$64,037	$1,250
Rio Phillips (WI)	$13,776	$13,624	$152
Source: Federal Election Commission

=== Results ===
2026 United States Senate election in West Virginia
Party	Candidate	Votes	%	±%
Republican	Shelley Moore Capito (incumbent)	266,772	58.33	
Democratic	Rachel Fetty Anderson	173,656	37.91	
Constitution	S. Marshall Wilson	17,183	3.76	
Write-in				
Total votes		457,611	100.0	
Republican hold				

Counties that flipped from Republican to Democratic

- Jefferson (largest city: Charles Town)
- Kanawha (largest city: Charleston)
- Monongalia (largest city: Morgantown)
