= Kenneth Hicks =

American politician

Member of the West Virginia House of Delegates from the 19th district
- In office December 1, 2014 – December 1, 2020
- Preceded by: Timothy Kinsey
- Succeeded by: Ric Griffith, Derrick Evans

Personal details
- Born: September 18, 1955 (age 70) Detroit, Michigan, U.S.
- Party: Democratic

Kenneth Hicks (born September 18, 1955) is an American politician who served in the West Virginia House of Delegates representing the 19th district from 2014 until 2020.
