= Constitution Party National Convention =

United States presidential nominating convention

The Constitution Party National Convention is held by the United States Constitution Party every four years. As of April 2024, there have been nine.

Before 1999, the party was formerly known as the "U.S. Taxpayers' Party".

== 1992 ==
The first national convention of the party, then known as the U.S. Taxpayers Party, was held in September 1992 in New Orleans, Louisiana.

U.S. Taxpayers Party National Convention presidential vote, 1992
Candidate	Votes	Percentage
Howard Phillips	264	97.78%
Bo Gritz	4	1.48%
Evan Mecham	1	0.37%
Totals	269	100.00%

== 1996 ==
The second national convention of the U.S. Taxpayers Party was held on August 15 and 16, 1996, at the Hotel del Coronado in Coronado, California.

U.S. Taxpayers Party National Convention presidential vote, 1996
Candidate	Votes	Percentage
Howard Phillips	393	92.83%
Charles E. Collins	20	4.81%
Ted Gunderson	5	1.18%
Pat Buchanan	5	1.18%
Diane Beall Templin (California)	0	0%
Totals	423	100.00%

== 1999 ==
The 1999 convention was held September 1–6, 1999, at the Regal Riverfront Hotel in St. Louis, Missouri. It was here that the party changed its name from the U.S. Taxpayers Party to the Constitution Party.

Constitution Party National Convention presidential vote, 1999
Candidate	Votes	Percentage
Howard Phillips	500	85.03%
Herbert Titus	88	14.97%
Totals	588	100.00%

Joseph Sobran was nominated unanimously for vice president.

Joseph Sobran later withdrew in April 2000, citing scheduling conflicts with his journalistic commitments. Curtis Frazier, a surgeon from Missouri, was later selected by the Party Committee to be his replacement on the ticket.

== 2004 ==
In 2004, the party's convention was held at the Valley Forge Convention Center in King of Prussia, Pennsylvania (popularly advertised as being held in "Valley Forge"). It was held from June 23 to June 26.

Michael Peroutka and Chuck Baldwin were nominated unanimously for president and vice president, respectively.

== 2008 ==
The party's 2008 convention was held on April 24–27, 2008, in Kansas City, Missouri.

Detailed map on the vote for the 2008 presidential nomination by individual state delegations.

Constitution Party National Convention presidential vote, 2008
Candidate	Votes	Percentage
Chuck Baldwin	383.8	74.38%
Alan Keyes	125.7	24.36%
Max Riekse (Michigan)	4.5	0.87%
Daniel Imperato (Georgia)	1.0	0.19%
Susan Ducey (Kansas)	1.0	0.19%
Totals	516.0	100.00%

Constitution Party National Convention vice presidential vote, 2008
Candidate	Votes	Percentage
Darrell Castle	389.0	75.98%
Scott Bradley (Utah)	58.0	11.33%
Don Grundmann (California)	43.7	8.54%
Mad Max Riekse (Michigan)	13.3	2.60%
Susan Ducey (Kansas)	8.0	1.56%
Totals	512.0	100.00%

== 2012 ==
Detailed map on the vote for the 2012 presidential nomination by individual state delegations

The party's 2012 presidential nominating convention was held in Nashville, Tennessee, on April 18–21.

Constitution Party National Convention presidential vote, 2012
Candidate	Votes	Percentage
Virgil Goode	203	50.37%
Darrell Castle	120	29.78%
Robby Wells	58	14.39%
Susan Ducey (Kansas)	15	3.72%
Laurie Roth	6	1.49%
Totals	402	100.00%

Jim Clymer was nominated for vice president by voice vote.

== 2016 ==
The party's 2016 presidential nominating convention was held in Salt Lake City, Utah, on April 13–16.

Constitution Party National Convention presidential vote, 2016
Candidate	Votes	Percentage
Darrell Castle	184	54.19%
Scott Copeland (Texas)	103.5	30.49%
Tom Hoefling	19	5.60%
Daniel Cummings (Wyoming)	9	2.65%
J.R. Myers (Alaska)	9	2.65%
Don Grundmann (California)	6	1.77%
John Diamond (Pennsylvania)	5	1.47%
Jeremy Friedbaum (Utah)	4	1.18%
Totals	339.5	100.00%

Scott Bradley was nominated for vice president by voice vote.

== 2020 ==
The party's 2020 presidential nominating convention was held via videoconference from May 1 to May 2.

The convention had originally been scheduled to be held in-person in St. Louis, Missouri, April 29–May 2, 2020. However, this plan was abandoned due to the impacts of the COVID-19 pandemic. On March 25, 2020, the party approved plans to instead hold a virtual conference May 1–2.

Constitution Party National Convention presidential vote, 2020, first ballot
Candidate	Votes	Percentage
Don Blankenship	139.5	46.19%
Charles Kraut	77.8	25.76%
Samm Tittle (Virginia)	46.35	15.35%
Don Grundmann (California)	25.25	8.36%
Daniel Clyde Cummings (Utah)	13.1	4.24%
Totals	302	100.00%

Constitution Party National Convention presidential vote, 2020, second ballot
Candidate	Votes	Percentage
Don Blankenship	177	57.28%
Charles Kraut	86.75	28.07%
Don Grundmann (California)	24	7.77%
Samm Tittle (Virginia)	21.25	6.88%
Totals	309	100.00%

William Mohr was nominated for vice president unanimously.

== 2024 ==
Detailed map on the vote for the 2024 presidential nomination by individual state delegations

The party's 2024 presidential nominating convention was held in Salt Lake City, Utah, on April 24–27.

Constitution Party National Convention presidential vote, 2024
Candidate	Votes	Percentage
Randall Terry	144	54.55%
Joel Skousen	80	30.30%
Paul Venable (Missouri)	32	12.12%
Daniel Cummings (Utah)	4	1.52%
Samm Tittle (Virginia)	2	0.76%
Brandon McIntyre (Florida)	2	0.76%
Louis C. Hook (Mississippi)	0	0%
Ben Stuart	0	0%
Totals	264	100.00%

Stephen Broden was nominated for vice president.
