= 2020 Constitution Party presidential primaries =

- March 3–10, 2020

339½ delegates to the Constitution Party National Convention
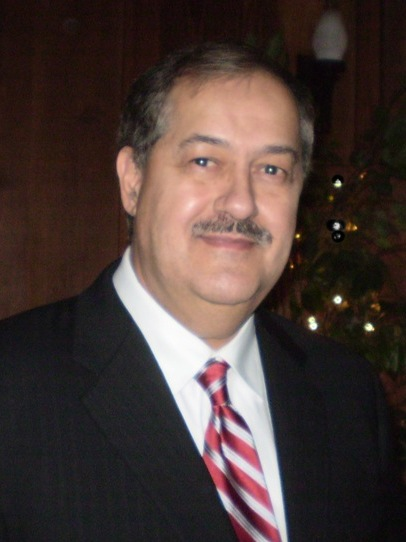

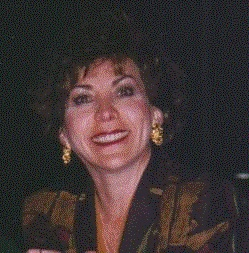
| Candidate | Don Blankenship | Uncommitted | Don J. Grundmann |
| Home state | West Virginia | n/a | California |
| Contests won | 2 | 1 | 0 |
| Popular vote | 641 | 397 | 256 |
| Percentage | 33.25% | 20.59% | 13.28% |
| Candidate | Samm Tittle | Charles Kraut |
| Home state | Texas | Virginia |
| Contests won | 1 | 0 |
| Popular vote | 199 | 186 |
| Percentage | 10.32% | 9.65% |
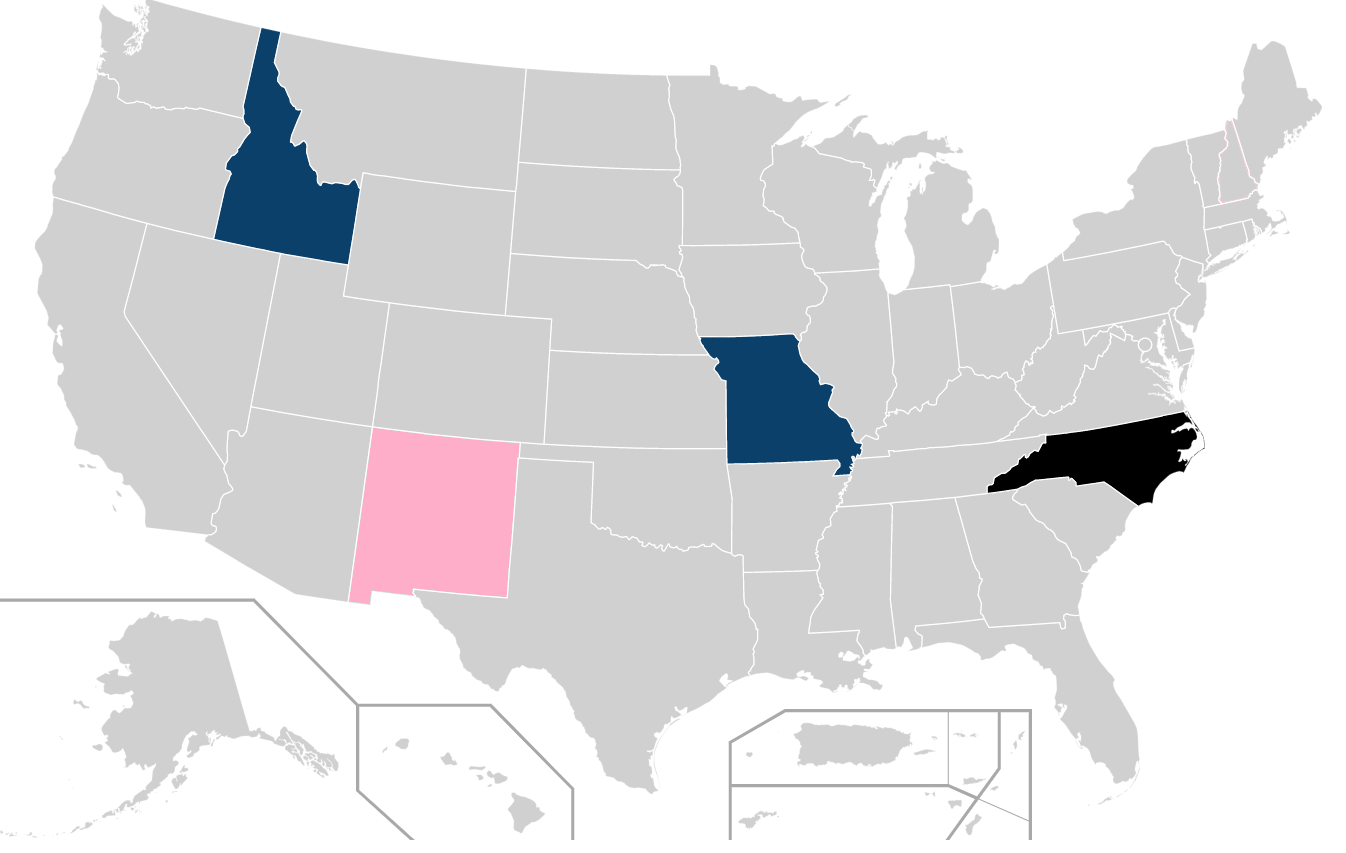

Don Blankenship
Charles Kraut
Don J. Grundmann
Samm Tittle
Daniel Cummings
Uncommitted/NOTA
Previous Constitution Party nominee
Darrell Castle
Constitution Party nominee
Don Blankenship

The 2020 Constitution Party presidential primaries were a series of primary elections determining the allocation of delegates in the selection of the Constitution Party's presidential nominee in the 2020 United States presidential election. On May 2, 2020, the Constitution Party nominated Don Blankenship for president and William Mohr for vice-president. Several state parties split from the national Constitution Party to nominate their own candidates.

== Background ==
Constitution Party nominees for president historically have received around 0.1% of the general election vote. In 2016 with attorney Darrell Castle as its nominee, the party reached a milestone, receiving over 200,000 votes for president for the first time. During the early months of 2019, there was some consternation among Constitution Party members over a perceived lack of candidates for the nomination.

== State affiliate disputes ==
After the Constitution Party chose Blankenship as its presidential nominee, there was substantial tension among several state affiliates of the Constitution Party over nominating Blankenship, who has been convicted of conspiring to willfully violate mine safety and health standards in relation to the Upper Big Branch Mine disaster. The same day that Blankenship was chosen as the nominee, the Constitution Party of Virginia broke with the national party, instead choosing to back Libertarian Justin Amash for the presidency.

On May 13, 2020, the Constitution Party of New Mexico also broke with the national CP, giving Blankenship's fellow candidate Samm Tittle their ballot line. Tittle was also endorsed by the Virginia Party after Amash withdrew from the presidential race. The Constitution Party of Idaho was reportedly considering not nominating William Mohr for vice president, and instead choosing their own vice presidential nominee, but they eventually acquiesced and nominated him for vice president.

== Candidates ==
=== Nominee ===
2020 Constitution Party ticket
| Don Blankenship | William Mohr |
| for President | for Vice President |
| Coal executive | Chairman of the U.S. Taxpayers Party of Michigan |
| 641 votes 2 states won (ID, MO) | |
Campaign

=== Defeated at convention ===
The following candidates received at least 5% of the vote at the 2020 Constitution Party national convention.

| Name | Born | Experience | Home state | Campaign Announcement date | Popular vote | Contests won | Ref |
|---|---|---|---|---|---|---|---|
| Don J. Grundmann | March 5, 1952 (age 74); Oakland, California | Chiropractor; Chairman of the Constitution Party of California | California | August 30, 2019; FEC filing | 256 | 0 | |
| Samm Tittle | El Paso, Texas | Independent Candidate for President in 2012 and 2016 | Texas | January 28, 2020; FEC filing | 199 | 1 (NM) | |
| Charles Kraut | New York | Financial adviser and author | Virginia | October 29, 2019; FEC filing | 186 | 0 | |

== Debates ==
Sites of the Constitution Party presidential debates (online debates not shown)

| No. | Date | Time (ET) | Place | Sponsor(s) | Moderators | Ref |
|---|---|---|---|---|---|---|
| 1 | February 25, 2020 | TBD | Online | Constitution Party of Texas | Scott Copeland; Ricardo Davis; Randy Stufflebeam | |
| 2 | February 29, 2020 | TBD | Boise, Idaho | Constitution Party of Idaho | TBD | |
| 3 | March 4, 2020 | TBD | Hilton Chicago, Chicago, Illinois | Free & Equal Elections Foundation | Christina Tobin | |
| 4 | April 1, 2020 | TBD | Online | Vision 20/20 | Randy Stufflebeam | |

Debates among candidates for the 2020 Constitution Party U.S. presidential nomination
| Date | State | Host | Participants | | | | | | |
| P Participant. A Absent. O Out of race (exploring, suspended, or not yet entered) | | | Blankenship | Cummings | Grundmann | Myers (Note: J. R. Myers is a member of the Life and Liberty Party, but was on the ballot for the Constitution Party primary in Idaho.) | Kraut | Tittle | Others |
|---|---|---|---|---|---|---|---|---|---|
| February 25, 2020 | Online | Constitution Party of Texas | A | P | P | A | P | P | none |
| February 29, 2020 | Boise, Idaho | Constitution Party of Idaho | P | P | P | P | P | P | none |
| March 4, 2020 | Chicago, Illinois | Free & Equal Elections Foundation | A | A | A | P | P | A | none |
| April 1, 2020 | Online | Vision 20/20 | P | P | P | A | P | P | none |

== Timeline ==
| Active campaigns |
| Withdrawn campaigns |
| Midterm elections |
| North Carolina primary |
| National emergency declared due to COVID-19 |
| Constitution National Convention |
| General election |

=== 2019 ===
- August 30: Don J. Grundmann announced his campaign and filed his candidacy with the FEC.
- September 11: Don Blankenship announced his campaign.
- October 29: Charles Kraut announced his campaign and filed his candidacy with the FEC.
- October 31: Don Blankenship filed his candidacy with the FEC.

=== 2020 ===
- February 25: The first Constitution Party debate took place online, held by Constitution Party of Texas.
- February 29: The second Constitution Party debate took place in Boise, Idaho.
- March 3: The North Carolina primary took place. Uncommitted delegates win a majority.
- March 4: Two Constitution Party candidates took part in the Free & Equal elections debate that took place in Chicago.
- March 10: Blankenship won Idaho and Missouri.
- April 1: The third Constitution Party debate took place online.
- May 13: Tittle won New Mexico.

== Primary and caucus calendar ==
| Date | Primaries/Caucuses/Conventions |
|---|---|
| March 3 | North Carolina primary |
| March 10 | Idaho primary Missouri primary |
| March 20 | Wyoming primary |
| April 18 | South Carolina primary |
| April 25 | Utah primary |
| May 13 | New Mexico primary |

== Ballot access ==
Filing for the primaries began in August 2019. indicates that the candidate was on the ballot for the upcoming primary contest and indicates that the candidate did not appear on the ballot in that state's contest.

Primaries and Caucuses
| State/ Territory | Date | Blankenship | Grundmann | Kraut | Tittle | Cummings | Myers | Ref |
|---|---|---|---|---|---|---|---|---|
| NC | Mar 3 | Blankenship-Yes | Grundmann-No | Kraut-Yes | Tittle-No | Cummings-No | Myers-No | |
| ID | Mar 10 | Blankenship-Yes | Grundmann-Yes | Kraut-Yes | Tittle-Yes | Cummings-Yes | Myers-Yes | |
| MO | Mar 10 | Blankenship-Yes | Grundmann-Yes | Kraut-No | Tittle-No | Cummings-No | Myers-No | |
| UT | Apr 25 | Blankenship-No | Grundmann-No | Kraut-No | Tittle-No | Cummings-No | Myers-No | |
| NM | May 13 | Blankenship-Yes | Grundmann-No | Kraut-No | Tittle-Yes | Cummings-No | Myers-No | |

== Results ==
| Date | Contest | Popular vote (Note: In the below table, blank cells indicate the candidate was not a ballot option or approved write-in candidate. Shaded cells indicate withdrawn candidates.) | | | | | | | Source |
| Date | Contest | Don Blankenship | Don J. Grundmann | Sheila “Samm” Tittle | Charles Kraut | Daniel Clyde Cummings | J. R. Myers | No Preference Uncommitted | Source |
|---|---|---|---|---|---|---|---|---|---|
| March 3 | North; Carolina | 102 (36.30%) | | | 62 (22.06%) | | | 117 (41.64%) | |
| March 10 | Idaho | 250 (27.59%) | 88 (9.71%) | 195 (21.52%) | 124 (13.69%) | 133 (14.68%) | 116 (12.80%) | | |
| March 10 | Missouri | 287 (39.05%) | 168 (22.86%) | | | | | 280 (38.10%) | |
| May 15 | New; Mexico | 2 (33.33%) | | 4 (66.67%) | | | | | |
| Popular vote (Percentage) | | 641 (33.25%) | 256 (13.28%) | 199 (10.32%) | 186 (9.65%) | 133 (6.90%) | 116 (6.02%) | 397 (20.59%) | |

=== North Carolina ===
North Carolina Constitution Party presidential primary, March 3, 2020
| Candidate | Popular vote | |
| Candidate | Count | Percentage |
|---|---|---|
| Uncommitted | 117 | 41.64% |
| Don Blankenship | 102 | 36.30% |
| Charles Kraut | 62 | 22.06% |
| Total: | 281 | 100% |

=== Idaho ===
Idaho Constitution Party presidential primary, March 10, 2020
| Candidate | Popular vote | |
| Candidate | Count | Percentage |
|---|---|---|
| Don Blankenship | 250 | 27.59% |
| Sheila “Samm” Tittle | 195 | 21.52% |
| Daniel Clyde Cummings | 133 | 14.68% |
| Charles Kraut | 124 | 13.69% |
| J. R. Myers | 116 | 12.80% |
| Don J. Grundmann | 88 | 9.71% |
| Total: | 906 | 100% |

=== Missouri ===
Missouri Constitution Party presidential primary, March 10, 2020
| Candidate | Popular vote | |
| Candidate | Count | Percentage |
|---|---|---|
| Don Blankenship | 287 | 39.05% |
| Uncommitted | 280 | 38.10% |
| Don J. Grundmann | 168 | 22.86% |
| Total: | 735 | 100% |

=== New Mexico ===
New Mexico Constitution Party presidential primary, May 15, 2020
| Candidate | Popular vote | |
| Candidate | Count | Percentage |
|---|---|---|
| Sheila “Samm” Tittle | 4 | 66.67% |
| Don Blankenship | 2 | 33.33% |
| Total: | 6 | 100% |

== See also ==
- 2020 United States presidential election

National Conventions

- 2020 Constitution Party National Convention
- 2020 Republican National Convention
- 2020 Democratic National Convention
- 2020 Libertarian National Convention
- 2020 Green National Convention

Presidential primaries

- 2020 Republican Party presidential primaries
- 2020 Democratic Party presidential primaries
- 2020 Libertarian Party presidential primaries
- 2020 Green Party presidential primaries
