= 2024 United States House of Representatives elections in West Virginia =

- November 5, 2024

Both West Virginia seats to the United States House of Representatives
	Majority party	Minority party
Party	Republican	Democratic
Last election	2	0
Seats won	2	0
Seat change	Steady	Steady
Popular vote	496,681	200,813
Percentage	68.67%	27.76%
Swing	▲2.56%	▼3.96%
- Republican 50–60% 60–70% 70–80% 80–90%

The 2024 United States House of Representatives elections in West Virginia were held on November 5, 2024, to elect the two U.S. representatives from the State of West Virginia, one from each of the state's two congressional districts. The elections coincided with the 2024 U.S. presidential election, as well as other elections to the House of Representatives, elections to the United States Senate, and various state and local elections. The primary elections were held on May 14, 2024.

== District 1 ==
2024 West Virginia's 1st congressional district election
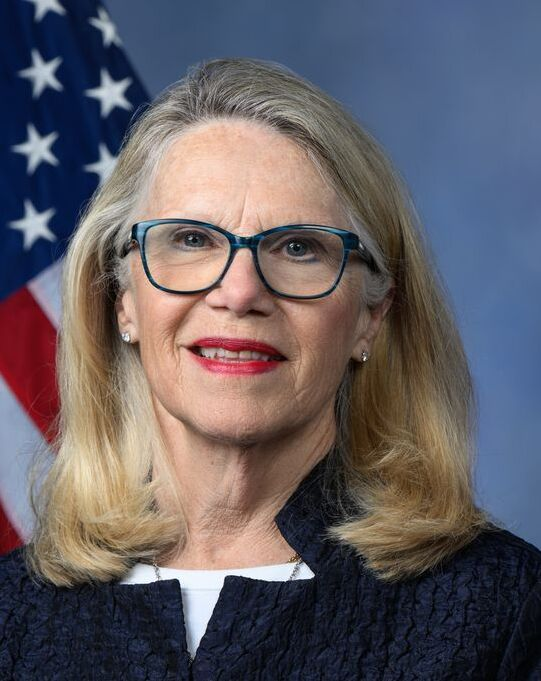

Nominee	Carol Miller	Chris Reed	Wes Holden
Party	Republican	Democratic	Independent
Popular vote	228,491	90,038	25,616
Percentage	66.4%	26.1%	7.4%
- County results Miller: 50–60% 60–70% 70–80%
U.S. Representative before election
Carol Miller
Republican
Elected U.S. Representative
Carol Miller
Republican

The 1st district encompasses Southern West Virginia, taking in Huntington, Charleston, Bluefield, Princeton and Beckley. The incumbent was Republican Carol Miller, who was re-elected with 66.7% of the vote in 2022.

=== Republican primary ===
==== Candidates ====
===== Nominee =====
- Carol Miller, incumbent U.S. representative (2019–present)

===== Eliminated in primary =====
- Derrick Evans, former state delegate (2020–2021), convicted felon, and participant in the January 6 Capitol attack

==== Endorsements ====
Derrick Evans

Executive branch officials

- Michael Flynn, former National Security advisor (2017), former director of the Defense Intelligence Agency (2012–2014)

U.S. representatives

- Bob Good, chair of the Freedom Caucus (2024) and VA-05 (2021–2025)

Individuals

- Mike Lindell, CEO of MyPillow

Organizations

- Republicans for National Renewal
Carol Miller

Organizations

- AIPAC
- Maggie's List
- National Rifle Association Political Victory Fund
- Republican Jewish Coalition
- U.S. Chamber of Commerce (post-primary)
- West Virginia Chamber of Commerce
- West Virginia Coal Association

==== Fundraising ====
Campaign finance reports as of April 24, 2024
Candidate	Raised	Spent	Cash on hand
Derrick Evans (R)	$782,651	$717,393	$65,258
Carol Miller (R)	$982,211	$1,066,230	$129,416
Source: Federal Election Commission

==== Results ====
Results by county: Miller—60–70% Miller—50–60% Evans—50–60%

Republican primary results
Party	Candidate	Votes	%
Republican	Carol Miller (incumbent)	65,343	62.95
Republican	Derrick Evans	38,466	37.05
Total votes		103,809	100.00

=== Democratic primary ===
==== Candidates ====
===== Nominee =====
- Chris Reed

===== Eliminated in primary =====
- Jim Umberger, teacher and therapist

==== Fundraising ====
Campaign finance reports as of April 24, 2024
Candidate	Raised	Spent	Cash on hand
Jim Umberger (D)	$69,825	$53,617	$16,207
Source: Federal Election Commission

==== Results ====
Results by county: Reed: Reed—70–80%; Reed—60–70%; Reed—50–60%; Umberger: Umberger—90–100%; Umberger—80–90%; Umberger—70–80%; Umberger—60–70%; Umberger—50–60%

The results were cleanly divided across the district: Reed carried 16 counties in the northwestern part of the district, while Umberger won 11 in its southeastern part. Reed recorded his best result in Logan County, which gave more than four fifths of its vote to Donald Trump in 2020. Conversely, Umberger achieved his strongest performance in Greenbrier County.

Democratic primary results
Party	Candidate	Votes	%
Democratic	Chris Reed	27,509	56.4
Democratic	Jim Umberger	21,253	43.6
Total votes		48,762	100.0

=== Independents ===
==== Declared ====
- Wes Holden, former deputy state director for U.S. Senator Jay Rockefeller

==== Endorsements ====
Wes Holden

Labor unions

- Communications Workers of America
- United Mine Workers of America
- West Virginia AFL–CIO

==== Fundraising ====
Campaign finance reports as of April 24, 2024
Candidate	Raised	Spent	Cash on hand
Wes Holden (I)	$16,377 (Note: $500 of this total was self-funded by Holden.)	$17,313	$0
Source: Federal Election Commission

=== General election ===
==== Predictions ====
Source	Ranking	As of
The Cook Political Report	Solid R	February 2, 2023
Inside Elections	Solid R	March 10, 2023
Sabato's Crystal Ball	Safe R	February 23, 2023
Elections Daily	Safe R	September 7, 2023
CNalysis	Solid R	November 16, 2023

==== Fundraising ====
Campaign finance reports as of September 30, 2024
Candidate	Raised	Spent	Cash on hand
Carol Miller (R)	$1,548,720	$1,532,672	$229,482
Wes Holden (I)	$35,425	$32,363	$3,061
Source: Federal Election Commission

==== Results ====
2024 West Virginia's 1st congressional district election
Party	Candidate	Votes	%
Republican	Carol Miller (incumbent)	228,491	66.4
Democratic	Chris Reed	90,038	26.1
Independent	Wes Holden	25,616	7.4
Write-in		174	0.1
Total votes		344,319	100.0
Republican hold			

==== By county ====
County	Carol Miller Republican		Chris Reed Democratic		Wes Holden Independent		Margin		Total
County	#	%	#	%	#	%	#	%	Total
Boone	5,180	67.27%	1,958	25.43%	562	7.30%	3,222	41.84%	7,700
Braxton	3,435	68.87%	1,346	26.98%	207	4.15%	2,089	41.88%	4,988
Cabell	21,776	63.63%	10,706	31.28%	1,743	5.09%	11,070	32.34%	34,225
Calhoun	1,882	71.40%	571	21.66%	183	6.94%	1,311	49.73%	2,636
Clay	2,058	68.12%	726	24.03%	237	7.85%	1,332	44.09%	3,021
Fayette	9,569	64.62%	4,064	27.45%	1,174	7.93%	5,505	37.18%	14,807
Gilmer	1,448	66.73%	617	28.43%	105	4.84%	831	38.29%	2,170
Greenbrier	9,759	68.75%	3,686	25.97%	750	5.28%	6,073	42.78%	14,195
Jackson	8,430	68.58%	2,487	20.23%	1,375	11.19%	5,943	48.35%	12,292
Kanawha	36,376	50.90%	26,487	37.06%	8,603	12.04%	9,889	13.84%	71,466
Lincoln	5,002	73.46%	1,369	20.11%	438	6.43%	3,633	53.36%	6,809
Logan	7,647	74.69%	2,048	20.00%	543	5.30%	5,599	54.69%	10,238
Mason	7,496	73.87%	2,077	20.47%	575	5.67%	5,419	53.40%	10,148
McDowell	3,340	71.37%	1,063	22.71%	277	5.92%	2,277	48.65%	4,680
Mercer	16,933	75.29%	4,507	20.04%	1,050	4.67%	12,426	55.25%	22,490
Mingo	6,022	78.72%	1,305	17.06%	323	4.22%	4,717	61.66%	7,650
Monroe	4,658	76.31%	1,109	18.17%	337	5.52%	3,549	58.14%	6,104
Nicholas	7,088	74.27%	1,960	20.54%	496	5.20%	5,128	53.73%	9,544
Pendleton	2,338	74.39%	629	20.01%	176	5.60%	1,709	54.37%	3,143
Pocahontas	2,493	68.62%	923	25.41%	217	5.97%	1,570	43.21%	3,633
Putnam	17,882	68.04%	6,490	24.69%	1,909	7.26%	11,392	43.35%	26,281
Raleigh	20,705	71.22%	6,249	21.49%	2,119	7.29%	14,456	49.72%	29,073
Roane	3,651	69.45%	1,139	21.67%	467	8.88%	2,512	47.78%	5,257
Summers	3,504	70.67%	1,193	24.06%	261	5.26%	2,311	46.61%	4,958
Wayne	10,754	73.51%	3,144	21.49%	731	5.00%	7,610	52.02%	14,629
Webster	2,039	75.05%	555	20.43%	123	4.53%	1,484	54.62%	2,717
Wirt	1,761	74.30%	449	18.95%	160	6.75%	1,312	55.36%	2,370
Wyoming	5,265	76.07%	1,181	17.06%	475	6.86%	4,084	59.01%	6,921
Totals	228,491	66.39%	90,038	26.16%	25,616	7.44%	138,453	40.23%	344,145

== District 2 ==
2024 West Virginia's 2nd congressional district election
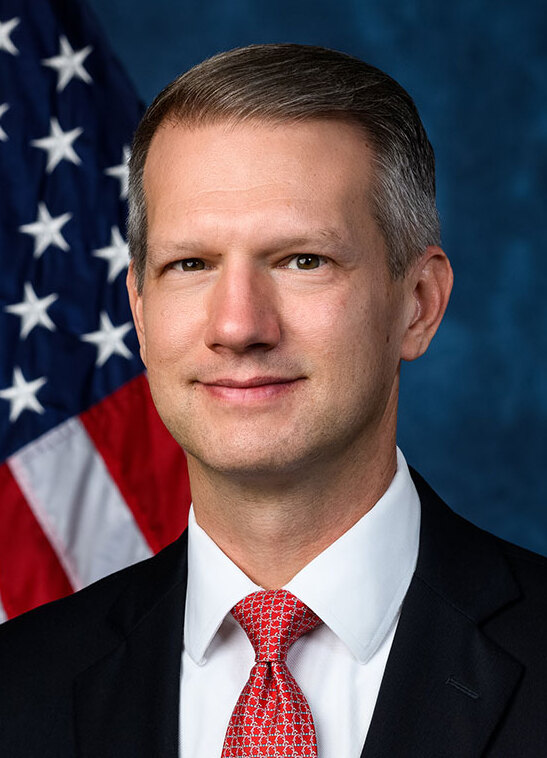

Nominee	Riley Moore	Steven Wendelin
Party	Republican	Democratic
Popular vote	268,190	110,775
Percentage	70.8%	29.2%
- County results Moore: 50–60% 60–70% 70–80% 80–90%
U.S. Representative before election
Alex Mooney
Republican
Elected U.S. Representative
Riley Moore
Republican

The 2nd district encompasses the industrial areas of the northern Panhandle including Wheeling, Fairmont, Clarksburg, Morgantown and Parkersburg, as well as the eastern Panhandle. The incumbent was Republican Alex Mooney, who was re-elected with 65.6% of the vote in 2022. Mooney retired to run for U.S. Senate.

=== Republican primary ===
==== Candidates ====
===== Nominee =====
- Riley Moore, West Virginia state treasurer (2021–2025)

===== Eliminated in primary =====
- Nate Cain, IT consultant
- Joseph Earley, cybersecurity consultant
- Alexander Gaaserud, third-party logistics executive
- Chris Walker, retired U.S. Air Force brigadier general

===== Declined =====
- Alex Mooney, incumbent U.S. representative (2015–present) (running for U.S. Senate; endorsed Moore)
- Patrick Morrisey, West Virginia attorney general (2013–present) and nominee for U.S. Senate in 2018 (ran for governor)

==== Endorsements ====
Nate Cain

Executive branch officials

- Michael Flynn, former National Security advisor (2017), former director of the Defense Intelligence Agency (2012–2014)
Riley Moore

U.S. senators

- JD Vance, U.S. senator from Ohio (2023–present)

U.S. representatives

- Kevin McCarthy, U.S. representative from CA-20 (2007–2023) and former speaker of the House (2023)
- Alex Mooney, U.S. representative from WV-02 (2015–present)

State legislators

- Patricia Rucker, state senator from the 16th district (2016–present)
- 40 members of the West Virginia House of Delegates

Organizations

- AIPAC
- Americans for Prosperity
- BIPAC
- GOPAC
- National Rifle Association Political Victory Fund
- National Right to Life Committee
- Republican Main Street Partnership PAC
- Susan B. Anthony Pro-Life America
- West Virginia Chamber of Commerce
- West Virginia Coal Association

Labor unions

- United Mine Workers of America

==== Fundraising ====
Campaign finance reports as of April 24, 2024
Candidate	Raised	Spent	Cash on hand
Nate Cain (R)	$118,750	$110,967	$8,215
Joseph Earley (R)	$200,057 (Note: $80,000 of this total was self-funded by Earley.)	$167,484	$33,601
Alexander Gaserud (R)	$4,150 (Note: $3,350 of this total was self-funded by Gaserud.)	$4,848	$20
Riley Moore (R)	$882,833	$608,629	$407,863
Chris Walker (R)	$731,886 (Note: $70,000 of this total was self-funded by Walker.)	$630,260	$101,625
Source: Federal Election Commission

==== Results ====
Results by county: Moore: 30–40%; 40–50%; 50–60%; 70–80%; Earley: 30–40%; 40–50%; 50–60%

Republican primary results
Party	Candidate	Votes	%
Republican	Riley Moore	47,033	45.0
Republican	Joseph Earley	21,176	20.3
Republican	Chris Walker	15,203	14.5
Republican	Nate Cain	13,625	13.0
Republican	Alexander Gaaserud	7,453	7.1
Total votes		104,490	100.0

=== Democratic primary ===
==== Candidates ====
===== Nominee =====
- Steven Wendelin, retired U.S. Navy commander

==== Fundraising ====
Campaign finance reports as of April 24, 2024
Candidate	Raised	Spent	Cash on hand
Steven Wendelin (D)	$12,421	$9,630	$2,791
Source: Federal Election Commission

==== Results ====
Democratic primary results
Party	Candidate	Votes	%
Democratic	Steven Wendelin	39,832	100.0
Total votes		39,832	100.0

=== General election ===
==== Predictions ====
Source	Ranking	As of
The Cook Political Report	Solid R	February 2, 2023
Inside Elections	Solid R	March 10, 2023
Sabato's Crystal Ball	Safe R	February 23, 2023
Elections Daily	Safe R	September 7, 2023
CNalysis	Solid R	November 16, 2023

==== Results ====
2024 West Virginia's 2nd congressional district election
Party	Candidate	Votes	%
Republican	Riley Moore	268,190	70.8
Democratic	Steven Wendelin	110,775	29.2
Total votes		378,965	100.0
Republican hold			

==== By county ====
County	Riley Moore Republican		Steven Wendelin Democratic		Margin		Total
County	#	%	#	%	#	%	Total
Barbour	4,800	79.38%	1,247	20.62%	3,553	58.76%	6,047
Berkeley	38,173	70.75%	15,783	29.25%	22,390	41.50%	53,956
Brooke	6,752	73.69%	2,411	26.31%	4,341	47.38%	9,163
Doddridge	2,420	86.34%	383	13.66%	2,037	72.67%	2,803
Grant	4,271	83.65%	835	16.35%	3,436	67.29%	5,106
Hampshire	7,626	76.51%	2,341	23.49%	5,285	53.02%	9,967
Hancock	9,269	75.14%	3,067	24.86%	6,202	50.28%	12,336
Hardy	4,113	66.65%	2,058	33.35%	2,055	33.30%	6,171
Harrison	20,290	72.28%	7,782	27.72%	12,508	44.56%	28,072
Jefferson	17,827	62.63%	10,635	37.37%	7,192	25.27%	28,462
Lewis	5,376	79.49%	1,387	20.51%	3,989	58.98%	6,763
Marion	15,691	66.73%	7,822	33.27%	7,869	33.47%	23,513
Marshall	9,617	76.04%	3,031	23.96%	6,586	52.07%	12,648
Mineral	9,721	78.12%	2,722	21.88%	6,999	56.25%	12,443
Monongalia	21,284	53.76%	18,304	46.24%	2,980	7.53%	39,588
Morgan	6,758	78.70%	1,829	21.30%	4,929	57.40%	8,587
Ohio	11,925	67.08%	5,853	32.92%	6,072	34.15%	17,778
Pleasants	2,495	79.64%	638	20.36%	1,857	59.27%	3,133
Preston	10,567	78.01%	2,979	21.99%	7,588	56.02%	13,546
Randolph	7,871	71.96%	3,067	28.04%	4,804	43.92%	10,938
Ritchie	3,212	85.84%	530	14.16%	2,682	71.67%	3,742
Taylor	5,400	77.22%	1,593	22.78%	3,807	54.44%	6,993
Tucker	2,467	71.69%	974	28.31%	1,493	43.39%	3,441
Tyler	2,807	82.58%	592	17.42%	2,215	65.17%	3,399
Upshur	7,351	78.79%	1,979	21.21%	5,372	57.58%	9,330
Wetzel	4,394	76.82%	1,326	23.18%	3,068	53.64%	5,720
Wood	25,713	72.80%	9,607	27.20%	16,106	45.60%	35,320
Totals	268,190	70.77%	110,775	29.23%	157,415	41.54%	378,965
