= Clinic escort =

Family planning clinic assistant

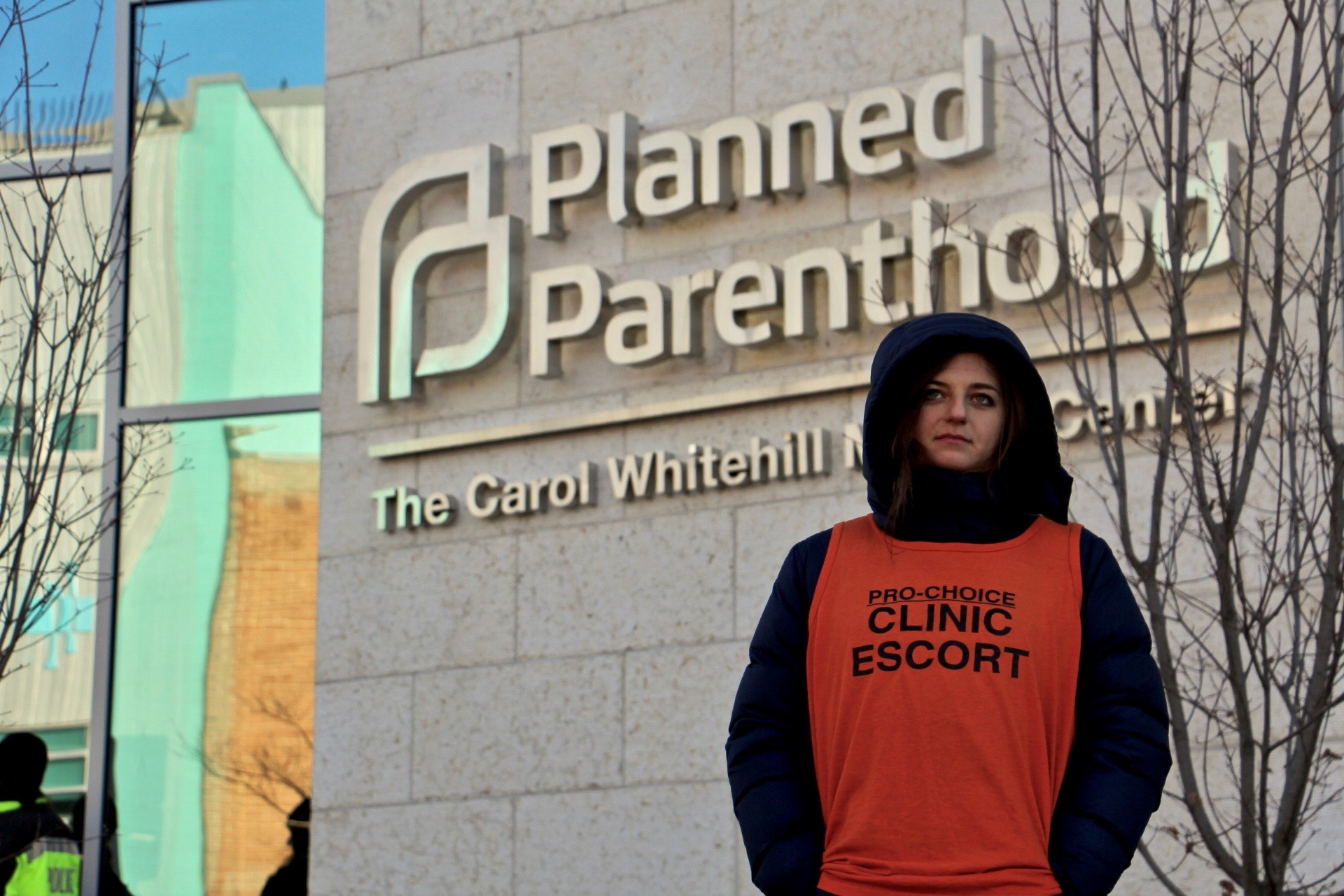
A clinic escort outside the Planned Parenthood – Carol Whitehill Moses Center

An abortion clinic escort is an individual who volunteers at an abortion clinic or family planning clinic. Their role is to assist patients and staff to enter and exit these facilities safely, and to prevent any potential harassment or danger to individuals. A clinic escort's role at a family planning clinic encompasses myriad different tasks, which can also vary between clinics.

Instances of anti-abortion protesting and violence have occurred throughout history, where groups or individuals have protested outside of family planning clinics, and in other instances, used violence against clinic escorts, doctors, and patients.

Abortion laws also vary across different countries and jurisdictions, with some enacting laws to protect clinic escorts, other clinic staff, and patients in family planning clinics.

== Role of a clinic escort ==
There are various rules and guidelines that exist at each family planning clinic, but the role of abortion clinic escorts is to approach patients and inform them why they are there and that they work with the clinic. The clinic escorts walk patients and staff to and from the clinic entrance when they believe there is a need for assistance, protecting them by acting as a buffer. The abortion clinic escort is there to protect a patient's legal right to access the family planning clinic's services, whether or not that be for the purpose of an abortion. Often, the clinic escorts are told never to stand in front of, or block a patient or staff's path to the entrance of the clinic, and not to make any contact if protesters are present.

Escorts typically wear a high-visibility waistcoat while signed in to visibly indicate their role.

Clinic escorts typically undergo training offered by the clinic or affiliated volunteer organizations. This training often includes strategies for de-escalation, non-engagement with protesters, maintaining patient confidentiality, and recognizing signs of escalating danger.

In order to protect the abortion clinic escort's own privacy, usual practice involves refraining from referring to each other by name. Additionally, an abortion clinic escort is asked to equally respect the wishes of a patient if they do not want to be escorted to and from the family planning centre.

It is the policy at certain family planning clinics for clinic escorts to uphold and respect others’ right to freedom of speech and the freedom to protest. In raising this point, abortion clinics will inform clinic escorts to distinguish between maintaining this right and recognising when a law has been broken. If the latter occurs, abortion clinic escorts are directed to report this, as their role is to protect a patient's legal right to access the family planning clinics' services.

It is worth noting that laws will differ country to country, however, examples of illegal activity include trespass, assault, or battery. In the US, it is illegal to ‘intimidate, interfere with, or threaten a client entering a clinic; it is illegal to block the entrance or driveway, or disturb clinic services with noise or unruly behavior’. In some countries, patients have a right not to be photographed, if this is the case, clinic escorts are directed to step in front of, or shield a patient, if an attempt is being made by someone to photograph the patient.

Generally, rules setting out the role of clinic escorts suggest that they should always be aware of their surroundings and any unusual behaviour occurring near them, or near the premises of the family planning clinic. They should follow security procedures that their local clinic has informed them to adhere to, and report any suspected dangers to the family planning clinic.

== Abortion debates ==
Abortion is a contested and polarising issue that has been the topic of substantial debate. This is due to differing moral, religious, political, and legal views and perspectives that individuals, groups, and societies hold.

Groups or individuals who believe in abortion rights usually identify as being “pro-choice”. This means that they believe that human beings should have the right to decide whether or not they wish to have a child. Further, these groups believe that women should have reproductive rights and a right to choose whether or not they wish to carry out or to terminate a pregnancy. On the other hand, groups or individuals who are anti-abortion sometimes describe themselves using the term “pro-life”. This view believes that an embryo, or a foetus, is a human being who has the right to life, and some individuals or groups believe that abortion can be equated to an act of murder.

While these two opposing sides exist in the abortion debate, note that there are shades of diverse beliefs and opinions that exist outside of, or within these two groups. The complexity of the debate may not be fully realised if the debate is reduced to these two labels.

The topic of abortion is an issue of moral debate surrounding women's rights, the rights of a foetus, and when personhood commences. While this is the case, these normative debates of what is morally correct can then lead to legal implications and legal debate over what the laws surrounding abortion should be. While some push for the expansion of an individual's right to access abortion, others seek to enact laws to make abortion illegal.

== Anti-abortion protests and violence ==
Expressions of anti-abortion sentiment occurs in various ways. Protesting from various groups can occur outside of a family planning clinic or a facility that performs abortions. This can possibly be in the form of peaceful picketing or could lead to harassment and large demonstrations. On occasion, extreme acts of violence and terrorism have occurred in different forms, which clinic escorts, doctors, staff and patients have been exposed to.

Usually, daily picketing outside of a family planning clinic involves individuals or groups gathering outside of a facility with anti-abortion posters, who approach patients entering in an attempt to convince them not to have an abortion.

Other forms of protesting that has been carried out include: the mass scheduling of no-show appointments by anti-abortion groups, to prevent people from accessing their abortion rights; calling the clinics in order to occupy all the telephone lines so patients are unable to get through; and vandalism of facilities.

More extreme measures that have occurred against doctors, abortion clinic escorts or other staff include: tracing the license plate numbers of individuals, and picketing at the homes of staff and patients. Photos of patients, doctors and staff, as well as their number plates have also been reported to be uploaded to anti-abortion websites, along with lists of their names. Usually, these activities are not isolated events, but are continual and patterned pressure that is directed at the family planning centres and its staff.

Additionally, acts of violence and terrorism have even taken place. One instance of violence occurred in 1993 in Pensacola, Florida where a doctor, David Gunn, died after being shot outside of an abortion clinic. Michael Griffin was the perpetrator of this act of violence.

Another occurrence took place on July 29, 1994, when a man named Paul Hill shot Dr. John Britton and clinic escort James Barrett with a 12-gauge shotgun outside of a family planning clinic. Hill first shot and killed Barrett, before shooting Britton in the head and injuring June Barrett, Barrett's wife. Britton was even wearing a bulletproof vest at the time. Hill later revealed that he had a suspicion that Britton was wearing a bullet proof vest, and thus deliberately aimed at his head. This case fuelled more anti-abortion protesters to voice their opinions and was a platform for various groups to mobilise, speaking to the polarisation surrounding the abortion debate.

Some Anti-Abortion protesters will dress up as Clinic escorts and intentionally try to misinform people trying to enter the clinic.

== Clinic escorts and abortion laws ==
The laws surrounding the right to access abortions are extremely diverse and differ country to country, and sometimes even across regions within a country. On one hand, some jurisdictions have made abortion completely illegal, while other jurisdictions have not only legalised the procedure, but provide public funding for abortions to be carried out. This, too, has meant that an individual's access to a safe abortion is incredibly varied depending on where they are in the world.

According to a 2013 United Nations report, 93 per cent of countries allow abortion where its purpose is to save a woman's life. Around two thirds of the countries surveyed permit abortion when the physical or mental health of the pregnant woman is put at risk, and only in half the countries where a pregnancy resulted from rape or incest. 36 per cent of global governments allow abortions for economic or social reasons, or on request. These countries, however, contain 61 per cent of the world's population because they include countries such as China and India, which have very large populations. Six countries do not permit abortion under any circumstances. These countries are: the Dominican Republic, El Salvador, Malta, the Holy See, and Nicaragua.

It can be seen that regardless of moral debates, even where abortions in certain countries are illegal, they are still taking place. According to the United Nations, in countries where abortion laws are restrictive, there are much higher unsafe abortion rates. The unsafe abortion rate was over four times greater in countries that had restrictive abortion laws, compared to countries that had more liberal abortion laws. The former had 26.7 unsafe abortions for every 1,000 women aged 15 to 44 years old, whereas the latter only had 6.1 unsafe abortions for every 1,000 women of the same age range.

In certain jurisdictions, governments have responded to and taken measures to protect an individual's legal right to access abortion, or accessing general clinic services. Countries such as Australia and the US (in select states) have legislation in place to protect staff and patients against picketing, intimidation, harassment, and obstruction from the entrance to family planning clinics.

Governments in certain regions have passed legislation to create a radius around a family planning or abortion clinic in which certain activities, such as protesting, is prohibited. These areas are referred to as a ‘safe zone’, ‘access zone’, ‘buffer zone’ or ‘bubble zone’. This legislation allows patients and clinic staff to enter and exit family planning clinics, free from anti-abortion protesters.

There are different ways in which these protections have been legislated. In some jurisdictions, there are fixed protective zones, which are specified areas of a fixed radius around the entrance to family planning clinics, in which individuals are prohibited from engaging in certain activities. Additionally, there are floating protective zones, or bubble zones, in place which ‘float’ around individuals or vehicles who wish to access these clinics.

Alongside this legislation, other laws are in place in certain countries or states to limit or restrict certain protestor behaviour. This includes prohibiting photography around the entrance of abortion clinics to protect against the invasion of a patient's privacy. Additionally, there have been similar zones in place to protect the homes of doctors and clinic staff.

Individuals who support these laws put forward that these ‘safe zones’ are necessary to ensure a woman's legal right to abortion, and that these zones protect the safety of patients and clinic staff, and their right to feel safe and free from harassment.

In contrast, people who oppose the enactment of these laws argue that these ‘access zones’ infringe upon one's right to protest, the right to freedom of expression, and the right of freedom of assembly.
