= Robert Thompson (West Virginia politician) =

American politician

Member of the West Virginia House of Delegates
- In office 2016 – December 1, 2020
- Constituency: District 19

Personal details
- Party: Democratic

Robert Thompson is an American politician from West Virginia. He is a Democrat and represented District 19 in the West Virginia House of Delegates from 2016 to 2020.

Thompson served the Wayne County Commission from 2021 to 2025.
