= West Virginia AFL–CIO =

Affiliate of the AFL–CIO

WV AFL–CIO
- West Virginia AFL–CIO
- Founded: 1957
- Headquarters: Charleston, WV
- Location: United States
- Members: 80,000
- Key people: Joshua D. Sword, president
- Affiliations: AFL–CIO
- Website: www.wvaflcio.org

West Virginia AFL–CIO is the West Virginia state affiliate of the AFL–CIO. The West Virginia Labor Federation, AFL–CIO, was created in 1957.

It has about 80,000 members. It supports health care reform and helped to organize a rally in favor of reform on August 2, 2009. It also participated in a rally promoting the "Employee Free Choice Act" and drawing attention to job losses in West Virginia in March 2009.
