= Friends of Coal =

US coal industry advocacy organization

- Legal status: 501(c)(6) trade group
- Headquarters: Charleston, West Virginia, U.S.
- Leader: Chris Hamilton
- Website: www.friendsofcoal.org

Friends of Coal is a 501(c)(6) nonprofit trade group.

== History ==
Friends of Coal was founded in West Virginia by the coal industry as a countermeasure to environmental radicals during the summer of 2002 over debates about legislation concerning weight limits on West Virginia highways for trucks carrying coal.

A marketing firm called Charles Ryan Associates helped create a backbone for the organization. It subsequently broadened its efforts to improve the image of the coal industry and to link the coal industry to the economic and social self-identity of people who live near coal mines. As part of the latter effort, it sponsors local events like car shows and sports events. Friends of Coal also says it helps create jobs for upcoming generations.

== Activities ==
Friends of Coal represents coal mining in the United States.

Marshall University and West Virginia University played in a yearly football game sponsored by Friends of Coal, known as the Friends of Coal Bowl, from 2006 to 2012. In 2014, the Friends of Coal Bowl was a game between two Kentucky high school football teams. These sponsorships are controversial, and the universities have been criticized for "selling out" to the coal industry.

Friends of Coal sponsored An Evening with Charlie Daniels Band and Halfway to Hazard in Louisville, Kentucky in 2009.

Friends of Coal sponsors car shows and have a license plate available for purchase by their members. Revenue from purchases of the license plates forms 97% of the organization's annual revenue.

Friends of Coal provides academic scholarships for students who have a family member in the coal industry. During 2019, Friends of Coal gave away scholarships totaling US$222,930 (equivalent to $280,730 in 2025).

== Use of logo ==
In 2010, U.S. Senate candidate Rand Paul used Friends of Coal's logo in a political advertisement. Friends of Coal had not endorsed Paul's candidacy, and a Friends of Coal executive asked the Paul campaign to stop using the logo so that people would not wrongly think otherwise. The Paul campaign refused to stop using the logo, saying it was legal to use the logo, even without permission from the organization.

== Ladies Auxiliary ==
There is a sub-group from Friends of Coal known as Friends of Coal Ladies Auxiliary. It was founded in Beckley, West Virginia, in 2009 by Regina Fairchild. It aims to help the coal industry, similarly to Friends of Coal, and also participates in charity work and military troop support.
