= 2020 West Virginia elections =

- November 3, 2020
- Registered: 802,726
- Turnout: 63.25% (▲15.32%)

West Virginia held elections on November 3, 2020. The Democratic and Republican party primary elections were held on June 9, 2020.

The 2020 elections solidified West Virginia's rightward shift as Republican party candidates won all U.S. House seats, statewide executive offices and the U.S. Senate seat up for election (all with more than 56% of the vote) while also expanding their majorities in both state legislative chambers. President Donald Trump won every county in the state and 68.62% of the statewide vote in his re-election bid, for a statewide margin of 38.93%, even as he lost re-election nationwide.

== Federal offices ==
=== President ===
Incumbent Republican Donald Trump easily carried West Virginia, capturing 68.62% of the vote. Trump captured every county in the state and it was his second-best showing, behind only Wyoming.

=== Senate ===
Incumbent senator Shelley Moore Capito was easily reelected. With a vote share of 70.3%, she was the first Republican senator to win reelection in West Virginia since 1907.

=== House of Representatives ===
All 3 Incumbent Republican U.S. Representatives were easily reelected, all increasing their vote share compared to 2018.

== Governor ==
Incumbent Republican governor Jim Justice won reelection to a second term over Democrat Ben Salango with 64.8% of the vote. Justice increased his vote margin substantially compared with his first election in 2016, when he was the democratic candidate, receiving just 49.1% of the overall vote. This was the first time a Republican candidate carried every county in the state during a gubernatorial election.

== State legislature ==
=== State senate ===
17 of the 34 seats in the West Virginia State Senate held elections, including 11 Republican-held seats and 6 Democratic-held seats. Four incumbents chose not to seek re-election due to retirement: Democrats Paul Hardesty, Roman Prezioso, and Corey Palumbo and Republican Kenny Mann. Republicans won 3 seats over Democratic candidates, increasing their majority in the chamber from 20 to 23 seats.

=== House of Delegates ===
All 100 seats in the West Virginia House of Delegates will have an election. Nineteen incumbents chose not to seek re-election: 11 Democrats and 8 Republicans. Republicans flipped 18 seats, increasing their majority in the chamber from 58 to 76 seats.

== Attorney general ==
Republican incumbent Patrick Morrisey was re-elected with 51.63% of the vote in 2016 and successfully sought re-election.

=== Republican primary ===
==== Candidates ====
- Patrick Morrisey, incumbent attorney general of West Virginia and nominee for U.S. Senate in 2018

Republican primary results
Party	Candidate	Votes	%
Republican	Patrick Morrisey (incumbent)	175,837	100.0%
Total votes		175,837	100.0%

=== Democratic primary ===
==== Candidates ====
- Sam Petsonk, attorney
- Isaac Sponaugle, state delegate

Democratic primary results
Party	Candidate	Votes	%
Democratic	Sam Petsonk	86,849	50.04%
Democratic	Isaac Sponaugle	86,704	49.96%
Total votes		173,553	100.0%

=== Polling ===
Poll source	Date(s) administered	Sample size (Note: Key: A – all adults RV – registered voters LV – likely voters V – unclear)	Margin of error	Patrick Morrisey (R)	Sam Petsonk (D)	Undecided
Triton Polling and Research/WMOV	October 19–21, 2020	544 (LV)	± 4.2%	53%	41%	6%
Triton Polling & Research/WMOV	September 29–30, 2020 (Note: Additional data sourced from FiveThirtyEight)	525 (RV)	± 4.3%	53%	41%	6%

=== General election ===
General election results
Party	Candidate	Votes	%
Republican	Patrick Morrisey (incumbent)	487,250	63.77%
Democratic	Sam Petsonk	276,798	36.23%
Total votes		764,048	100.0%

== Secretary of state ==
Results by county Warner: 50-60%; 60-70%; 70-80%; 80-90%; Tennant: 50-60%

2020 West Virginia Secretary of State election
Party	Candidate	Votes	%
Republican	Mac Warner (incumbent)	447,537	58.26%
Democratic	Natalie Tennant	320,650	41.74%
Total votes		768,187	100.0%

== Treasurer ==
Democratic incumbent John Perdue was re-elected with 50.33% of the vote in 2016, but lost re-election to Republican candidate Riley Moore.

Results by county Moore: 50-60%; 60-70%; 70-80%; 80-90%; Perdue: 50-60%; 60-70%

2020 West Virginia State Treasurer election
Party	Candidate	Votes	%
Republican	Riley Moore	425,745	56.31%
Democratic	John Perdue (incumbent)	330,316	43.69%
Total votes		756,061	100.0%
Republican gain from Democratic			

== Auditor ==
2020 West Virginia State Auditor election
- November 3, 2020
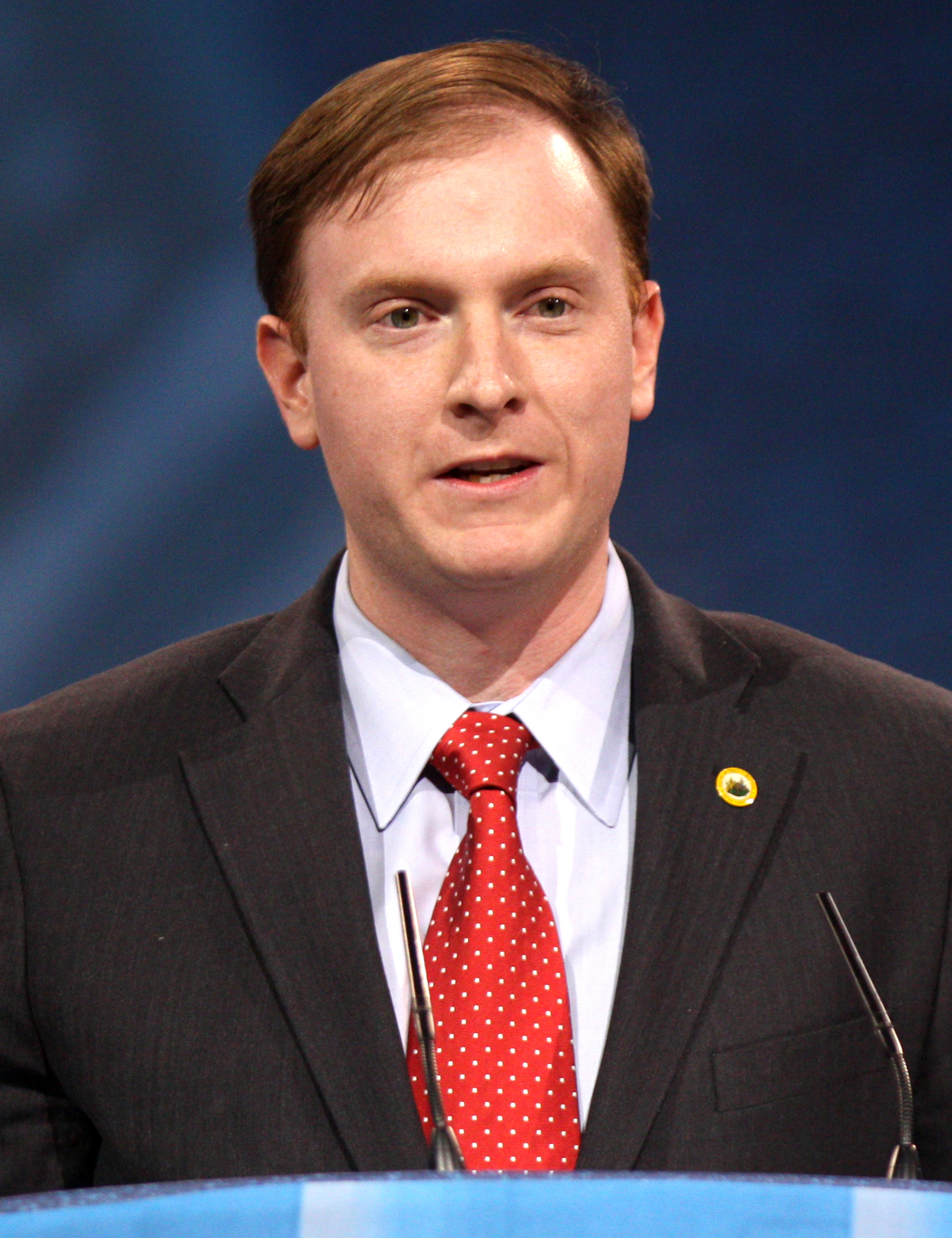

Nominee	JB McCuskey	Mary Ann Claytor
Party	Republican	Democratic
Popular vote	496,845	244,427
Percentage	67.03%	32.97%
- McCuskey: 50–60% 60–70% 70–80% 80–90% >90% Claytor: 50–60% 60–70% 70–80% 80–90% >90% Tie: 50%
State Auditor before election
JB McCuskey
Republican
Elected State Auditor
JB McCuskey
Republican

Republican incumbent JB McCuskey was elected with 58.48% of the vote in 2016 and successfully sought re-election.

=== Republican primary ===
==== Candidates ====
- JB McCuskey, incumbent West Virginia State Auditor

Republican primary results
Party	Candidate	Votes	%
Republican	JB McCuskey (incumbent)	169,577	100.0%
Total votes		169,577	100.0%

=== Democratic primary ===
==== Candidates ====
- Mary Ann Claytor, accountant and auditor, nominee for West Virginia State Auditor in 2016, candidate for West Virginia State Senate in 2018, and former candidate for the West Virginia House of Delegates in 2020

Democratic primary results
Party	Candidate	Votes	%
Democratic	Mary Ann Claytor	156,089	100.0%
Total votes		156,089	100.0%

=== General election ===
General election results
Party	Candidate	Votes	%
Republican	JB McCuskey (incumbent)	496,845	67.03%
Democratic	Mary Ann Claytor	244,427	32.97%
Total votes		741,272	100.0%

== Commissioner of Agriculture ==
2020 West Virginia Commissioner of Agriculture election
- November 3, 2020
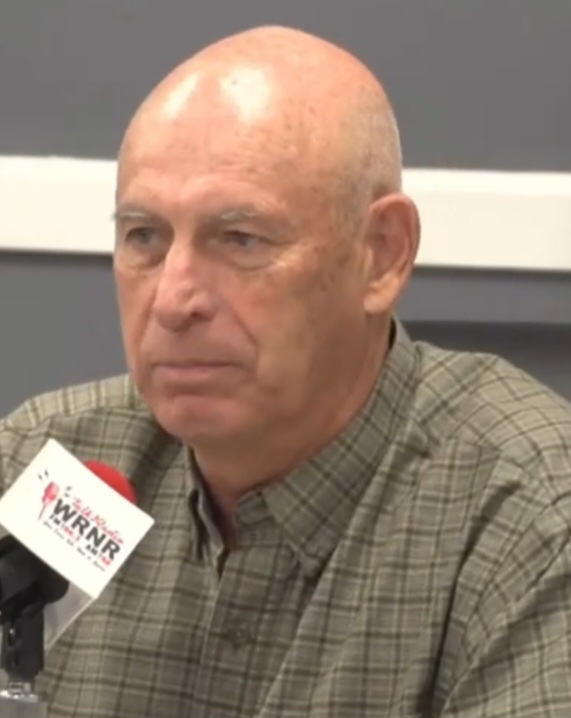

Nominee	Kent Leonhardt	Bob Beach
Party	Republican	Democratic
Popular vote	480,386	258,912
Percentage	64.98%	35.02%
- Leonhardt: 50–60% 60–70% 70–80% 80–90% >90% Beach: 50–60% 60–70% 70–80% 80–90% >90% Tie: 50%
Secretary of State before election
Kent Leonhardt
Republican
Elected Secretary of State
Kent Leonhardt
Republican

Republican incumbent Kent Leonhardt was elected with 48.41% of the vote in 2016 and successfully sought re-election.

=== Republican primary ===
==== Candidates ====
- Kent Leonhardt, incumbent West Virginia Commissioner of Agriculture
- Roy Ramey, farm owner and American Freedom nominee for West Virginia State Senate in 2014

Republican primary results
Party	Candidate	Votes	%
Republican	Kent Leonhardt (incumbent)	113,586	63.5%
Republican	Roy Ramey	65,336	36.5%
Total votes		178,922	100.0%

=== Democratic primary ===
==== Candidates ====
- Bob Beach, state senator
- William Keplinger, farmer and businessman
- Dave Miller, farmer

===== Withdrawn =====
- Patricia Bunner, attorney

Democratic primary results
Party	Candidate	Votes	%
Democratic	Bob Beach	81,074	48.0%
Democratic	William Keplinger	44,084	26.1%
Democratic	Dave Miller	43,916	26.0%
Total votes		169,074	100.0%

=== General election ===
General election results
Party	Candidate	Votes	%
Republican	Kent Leonhardt (incumbent)	480,386	64.98%
Democratic	Bob Beach	258,912	35.02%
Total votes		739,298	100.0%

== Supreme Court of Appeals ==
=== Division 1 ===
The incumbent was Tim Armstead, who was appointed to the court to replace Justice Menis Ketchum, who resigned from the court shortly before being convicted on a felony fraud charge. Armstead then won a 2018 special election to serve the remainder of Ketchum's term with 26.1% of the vote. He successfully won re-election to a full term.

==== Candidates ====
- Tim Armstead, incumbent justice and chief justice of the West Virginia Supreme Court of Appeals
- David Hummel Jr., circuit court judge on the Second West Virginia Circuit Court
- Richard Neely, former chief justice of the West Virginia Supreme Court of Appeals

Results by county Armstead: 30-40%; 40-50%; 50-60%; 60-70%; Neely: 30-40%; 40-50%; 50-60%; Hummel: 40-50%; 50-60%; 60-70%; 70-80%; 80-90%

General election results
Party	Candidate	Votes	%
Nonpartisan	Tim Armstead (incumbent)	151,755	41.0%
Nonpartisan	Richard Neely	132,069	35.7%
Nonpartisan	David Hummel Jr.	86,112	23.3%
Total votes		369,936	100.0%

=== Division 2 ===
The incumbent Margaret Workman, did not seek re-election after controversies and the threat of possible impeachment. Bill Wooton, a former state senator, was elected with 31.0% of the vote.

==== Candidates ====
- Jim Douglas, family court judge on the Eleventh West Virginia Circuit Court
- Kris Raynes, Putnam County assistant prosecuting attorney
- Joanna Tabit, circuit court judge on the Thirteenth West Virginia Circuit Court
- William R. Wooton, former state senator and candidate for the West Virginia Supreme Court of Appeals in 2016

Results by county Wooton: 20-30%; 30-40%; 40-50%; 50-60%; 60-70%; 70-80%; Tabit: 20-30%; 30-40%; 40-50%; 60-70%; Raynes: 30-40%; 50-60%; Douglas: 20-30%; 30-40%; 40-50%

General election results
Party	Candidate	Votes	%
Nonpartisan	William R. Wooton	115,668	31.0%
Nonpartisan	Joanna Tabit	108,952	29.2%
Nonpartisan	Kris Raynes	74,334	19.9%
Nonpartisan	Jim Douglas	73,843	19.8%
Total votes		372,797	100.0%

=== Division 3 ===
The incumbent was John A. Hutchison, who was appointed to the court to replace justice Allen Loughry, who resigned from the court in the midst of his impeachment trial. Hutchison successfully sought re-election to serve the remainder of Loughry's term.

==== Candidates ====
- Lora Dyer, circuit court judge on the Fifth West Virginia Circuit Court
- John A. Hutchison, incumbent justice and former circuit court judge
- William Schwartz, attorney

Results by county Hutchison: 30-40%; 40-50%; 60-70%; 70-80%; 80-90%; Dyer: 30-40%; 40-50%; 50-60%; 60-70%; 80-90%; Schwartz: 30-40%; 40-50%

General election results
Party	Candidate	Votes	%
Nonpartisan	John A. Hutchison (incumbent)	137,681	39.2%
Nonpartisan	Lora Dyer	124,939	31.0%
Nonpartisan	William Schwartz	88,369	25.6%
Total votes		350,989	100.0%
