= List of justices of the Supreme Court of Appeals of West Virginia =

Below is a complete list of justices who have served on the Supreme Court of Appeals of West Virginia since 1863.

== Court created by the 1863 West Virginia State Constitution ==
#	Name	Party	Tenure	Residence county	Elected	Predecessor	Successor	Composition
1	Ralph Lazier Berkshire	Republican	Jun. 20, 1863 – Dec. 31, 1866	Monongalia	1863	seat created	Maxwell
1	Ralph Lazier Berkshire	Republican	Sept. 10, 1868* – Dec. 31, 1872	Monongalia	1868^{^}	Harrison	seat abolished
2	William A. Harrison	Republican	Jun. 20, 1863 – Sept. 1, 1868°	Harrison	1863	seat created	Berkshire
3	James H. Brown	Republican	Jun. 20, 1863 – Dec. 31, 1870	Kanawha	1863	seat created	Moore	3	0
4	Edwin Maxwell	Republican	Jan. 1, 1867 – Dec. 31, 1872	Harrison	1866	Berkshire	seat abolished	3	0
5	Charles P.T. Moore	Democratic	Jan. 1, 1871 – Dec. 31, 1872	Mason	1870	Brown	seat abolished	2	1

== Court created by the 1872 West Virginia State Constitution ==
#	Name	Party	Tenure	Residence county	Elected	Predecessor	Successor	Composition
5	Charles P.T. Moore	Democratic	Jan. 1, 1873 – Jun. 1, 1881°	Mason	1872	seat created	Patton
6	John S. Hoffman	Democratic	Jan. 1, 1873 – Jun. 1, 1876°	Harrison	1872	seat created	Edmiston
7	James Paull	Democratic	Jan. 1, 1873 – May 11, 1875^{†}	Ohio	1872	seat created	Green
8	Alpheus F. Haymond	Democratic	Jan. 1, 1873 – Dec. 31, 1882°	Marion	1872 1876	seat created	S. Woods	4	0
9	Thomas C. Green	Democratic	Dec. 24, 1875* – Dec. 4, 1889^{†}	Jefferson	1876^{^} 1880	Paull	Lucas	4	0
10	Matthew Edmiston	Democratic	Jun. 13, 1876* – Dec. 31, 1876	Lewis	-----	Hoffmann	Johnson	4	0
11	Okey Johnson	Democratic	Jan. 1, 1877 – Dec. 31, 1888	Wood	1876	Edmiston	Brannon	4	0
12	James French Patton	Democratic	Jun. 1, 1881* – Mar. 30, 1882^{†}	Monroe	-----	Moore	Snyder	4	0
13	Adam C. Snyder	Democratic	Jun. 1, 1882* – Nov. 8, 1890°	Greenbrier	1882^{^} 1884	Patton	Holt	4	0
14	Samuel Woods	Democratic	Jan. 1, 1883* – Dec. 31, 1888	Barbour	1882^{^}	A. Haymond	English	4	0
15	Henry Brannon	Democratic	Jan. 1, 1889 – Dec. 31, 1900	Lewis	1888	Johnson		4	0
15	Henry Brannon	Republican	Jan. 1, 1901 – Dec. 31, 1912	Lewis	1900		Lynch
16	John W. English	Democratic	Jan. 1, 1889 – Dec. 31, 1900	Mason	1888	S. Woods	Poffenbarger	4	0
17	Daniel B. Lucas	Democratic	Dec. 11, 1889* – Dec. 31, 1892	Jefferson	1890^{^}	Green	Dent	4	0
18	Homer A. Holt	Democratic	Nov. 8, 1890* – Dec. 31, 1896	Greenbrier	1890^{^}	Snyder	McWhorter	4	0
19	Marmaduke H. Dent	Democratic	Jan. 1, 1893 – Dec. 31, 1904	Taylor	1892	Lucas	Cox	4	0
20	Henry C. McWhorter	Republican	Jan. 1, 1897 – Dec. 31, 1908	Kanawha	1896	Holt	Williams	3	1
21	George Poffenbarger	Republican	Jan. 1, 1901 – Dec. 31, 1922°	Mason	1900 1912	English	Litz	3	1
22	Warren Miller	Republican	Jan. 17, 1903* – Dec. 31, 1904	Jackson	-----	seat created	Sanders	4	1
23	Frank Cox	Republican	Jan. 1, 1905 – Jan. 28, 1907°	Monongalia	1904	Dent	Wm. Miller	5	0
24	Joseph M. Sanders	Republican	Jan. 1, 1905 – Oct. 1, 1907°	Mercer	1904	W. Miller	Robinson	5	0
25	William N. Miller	Republican	Jan. 28, 1907* – Aug. 7, 1928^{†}	Wood	1908^{^} 1916	Cox	Maxwell	5	0
26	Ira E. Robinson	Republican	Oct. 15, 1907* – Oct. 26, 1915°	Taylor	1908^{^}	Sanders	Mason	5	0
27	L. Judson Williams	Republican	Jan. 1, 1909 – Dec. 31, 1920	Greenbrier	1908	McWhorter	Lively	5	0
28	Charles W. Lynch	Republican	Jan. 1, 1913 – Dec. 31, 1921°	Harrison	1912	Brannon	Meredith	5	0
29	John W. Mason	Republican	Nov. 1, 1915* – Dec. 31, 1916	Marion	-----	Robinson	Ritz	5	0
30	Harold A. Ritz	Republican	Jan. 1, 1917 – Nov. 30, 1922°	Mercer	1916	Mason	Meredith	5	0
31	Frank Lively	Republican	Jan. 1, 1921 – Dec. 31, 1932	Kanawha	1920	Williams	Kenna	5	0
32	James A. Meredith	Republican	Jan. 2, 1922* – Dec. 31, 1923	Marion	-----	Lynch	McGinnis	5	0
32	James A. Meredith	Republican	Jan. 1, 1923* – Nov. 4, 1924	Marion	-----	Ritz	Hatcher	4	1
33	William H. McGinnis	Democratic	Jan. 1, 1923 – Dec. 31, 1924	Raleigh	1922^{^}	Meredith	H. Woods	4	1
34	M.O. Litz	Republican	Jan. 1, 1923* – Dec. 31, 1936	McDowell	1924	Poffenbarger	Fox	4	1
35	John H. Hatcher	Republican	Nov. 4, 1924 – Dec. 31, 1940	Raleigh	1924^{^} 1928	Meredith	Rose	5	0
36	Homer B. Woods	Republican	Jan. 1, 1925 – Dec. 31, 1936	Ritchie	1924	McGinnis	Riley	5	0
37	Haymond Maxwell	Republican	Aug. 21, 1928* – Dec. 31, 1940	Harrison	1928	Wm. Miller	Lovins	5	0
38	J. N. Kenna	Democratic	Jan. 1, 1933 – Jan. 20, 1950^{†}	Kanawha	1932 1944	Lively	Given	4	1
39	Fred L. Fox	Democratic	Jan. 1, 1937 – Aug. 8, 1952^{†}	Braxton	1936 1948	Litz	Browning	3	2
40	James B. Riley	Democratic	Jan. 1, 1937 – Jun. 29, 1958^{†}	Ohio	1936 1948	H. Woods	Donley	3	2
41	Herschel H. Rose	Democratic	Jan. 1, 1941 – Jun. 17, 1945^{†}	Marion	1940	Hatcher	F. Haymond	5	0
42	William T. Lovins	Democratic	Jan. 1, 1941 – Jan. 11, 1957°	Cabell	1940 1952	Maxwell	Ducker	5	0
43	Frank Cruise Haymond	Democratic	Jul. 1, 1945* – Jun. 10, 1972^{†}	Marion	1946^{^} 1952 1964	Rose	Haden	5	0
44	Leslie E. Given	Democratic	Jan. 27, 1950* – May 11, 1962^{†}	Kanawha	1950^{^} 1956	Kenna	Caplan	5	0
45	Chauncey Browning Sr.	Democratic	Aug. 18, 1952* – Jun. 24, 1971^{†}	Logan	1952^{^} 1960	Fox	Carrigan	5	0
46	Henry L. Ducker	Democratic	Jan. 11, 1957* – Nov. 4, 1958	Cabell	-----	Lovins	Berry	5	0
47	Robert T. Donley	Republican	Jul. 3, 1958* – Nov. 4, 1958	Monongalia	-----	Riley	Calhoun	4	1
48	Thornton G. Berry Jr.	Democratic	Nov. 4, 1958 – Dec. 31, 1976	McDowell	1958^{^} 1964	Ducker	Thom. Miller	5	0
49	Harlan M. Calhoun	Democratic	Nov. 4, 1958 – May 15, 1972°	Hardy	1958^{^} 1960	Donley	Kessel	5	0
50	Fred H. Caplan	Democratic	May 28, 1962* – Dec. 31, 1980	Harrison	1964^{^} 1968	Given	McHugh	5	0
51	John E. Carrigan	Republican	Jul. 13, 1971* – Dec. 31, 1972	Marshall	-----	Browning	Sprouse	4	1
52	Charles H. Haden II	Republican	Jun. 21, 1972* – Dec. 19, 1975°	Monongalia	1972^{^}	F. Haymond	Wilson	3	2
53	Oliver D. Kessel	Republican	Jun. 23, 1972* – Dec. 31, 1972	Jackson	-----	Calhoun	Neely	3	2
54	James Marshall Sprouse	Democratic	Jan. 1, 1973 – Jun. 27, 1975°	Monroe	1972	Carrigan	Flowers	4	1
55	Richard Forlani Neely	Democratic	Jan. 1, 1973 – Apr. 15, 1995°	Marion	1972 1984	Kessel	Recht	4	1
56	Edwin F. Flowers	Republican	Sept. 8, 1975* – Dec. 31, 1976	Hancock	-----	Sprouse	Harshbarger	3	2
57	Donald R. Wilson	Republican	Jan. 26, 1976* – Dec. 31, 1976	Jackson	-----	Haden	D. McGraw	3	2
58	Sam R. Harshbarger	Democratic	Jan. 1, 1977 – Dec. 31, 1984	Cabell	1976^{^}	Flowers	Brotherton	5	0
59	Thomas B. Miller	Democratic	Jan. 1, 1977 – Aug. 30, 1994°	Ohio	1976 1988	Berry	Cleckley	5	0
60	Darrell McGraw	Democratic	Jan. 1, 1977 – Dec. 31, 1988	Wyoming	1976	Wilson	Workman	5	0
61	Thomas E. McHugh	Democratic	Jan. 1, 1981 – Dec. 31, 1997°	Kanawha	1980 1992	Caplan	McCuskey	5	0
61	Thomas E. McHugh	Democratic	Apr. 8, 2009* – Dec. 31, 2012	Kanawha	2010^{^}	Albright	Loughry
62	W.T. Brotherton Jr.	Democratic	Jan. 1, 1985 – Aug. 31, 1995°	Kanawha	1984	Harshbarger	Albright	5	0
63	Margaret Workman	Democratic	Jan. 1, 1989 – Aug. 31, 1999°	Kanawha	1988	D. McGraw	Scott	5	0
63	Margaret Workman	Democratic	Jan. 1, 2009 – Dec. 31, 2020	Kanawha	2008	Starcher	Wooton
64	Franklin Cleckley	Democratic	Sept. 6, 1994* – Nov. 5, 1996	Monongalia	-----	Thom. Miller	Davis	5	0
65	Arthur M. Recht	Democratic	May 26, 1995* – Oct. 15, 1996°	Ohio	-----	Neely	Maynard	5	0
66	Joseph P. Albright	Democratic	Sept. 26, 1995* – Dec. 31, 1996	Wood	-----	Brotherton	Starcher	5	0
66	Joseph P. Albright	Democratic	Jan. 1, 2001 – March 20, 2009^{†}	Wood	2000	Scott	McHugh
67	Robin Davis	Democratic	Dec. 16, 1996 – Aug. 13, 2018°	Kanawha	1996^{^} 2000 2012	Cleckley	Armstead
68	Larry Starcher	Democratic	Jan. 1, 1997 – Dec. 31, 2008	Monongalia	1996	Albright	Ketchum
69	Spike Maynard	Democratic	Jan. 1, 1997 – Dec. 31, 2008	Mingo	1996	Recht	Workman
70	John F. McCuskey	Republican	Jan. 12, 1998* – Dec. 31, 1998	Kanawha	-----	McHugh	W. McGraw	4	1
71	Warren R. McGraw	Democratic	Jan. 1, 1999 – Dec. 31, 2004	Wyoming	1998^{^}	McCuskey	Benjamin	5	0
72	George M. Scott	Republican	Nov. 4, 1999* – Dec. 31, 2000	Roane	-----	Workman	Albright	4	1
73	Brent D. Benjamin	Republican	Jan. 1, 2005 – Dec. 31, 2016	Kanawha	2004	W. McGraw	Walker	4	1
74	Menis Ketchum	Democratic	Jan. 1, 2009 – July 27, 2018°	Wayne	2008	Maynard	Jenkins	4	1
75	Allen Loughry	Republican	Jan. 1, 2013 – Nov. 12, 2018 °	Kanawha	2012	McHugh	Hutchison	3	2
76	Beth Walker	Republican	Jan. 1, 2017 – June 27, 2025 °	Monongalia	2016	Benjamin	Ewing	3	2
77	Tim Armstead	Republican	Sept. 25, 2018* – August 26, 2025†	Kanawha	2018	Ketchum	Titus	2	3
78	Evan Jenkins	Republican	Oct. 1, 2018* – Feb. 4, 2022	Cabell	2018	Davis	Bunn	1	4
79	John Hutchison	Democratic	Dec. 12, 2018* – Jan. 1, 2025	Raleigh	2020	Loughry	Trump	2	3
80	William Wooton	Democratic	Jan. 1, 2021 – present	Raleigh	2020	Workman	Incumbent	2	3
81	C. Haley Bunn	Republican	Apr. 27, 2022* – present	Wyoming	2024	Jenkins	Incumbent	2	3
82	Charles S. Trump	Republican	Jan. 1, 2025 – present	Morgan	2024	Hutchison	Incumbent	1	4
83	Tom Ewing	Republican	Aug. 6, 2025* – June 11, 2026	Fayette	-----	Walker	Flanigan	1	4
84	Gerald Titus III	Republican	Nov. 21, 2025* – June 12, 2026	Kanawha	-----	Armstead	Kirkpatrick	1	4
85	Bill Flanigan	Republican	June 11, 2026 – present	Ohio	2026^	Ewing	Incumbent	1	4
86	Kirk Kirkpatrick	Republican	June 12, 2026 – present	Raleigh	2026^	Titus	Incumbent	1	4

* appointed ----- † died in office ----- ° resigned/retired ----- ^ elected to an unexpired term

== Succession by seat ==
Year	Seat 1	Seat 2	Seat 3
1863	Seat 1	Seat 2	Seat 3
Jun. 20	Berkshire	Harrison	Brown
1864	Berkshire	Harrison	Brown
1865	Berkshire	Harrison	Brown
1866	Berkshire	Harrison	Brown
1867	Maxwell	Harrison	Brown
1868	Maxwell	Harrison	Brown
Sept. 10	Maxwell	Berkshire	Brown
1869	Maxwell	Berkshire	Brown
1870	Maxwell	Berkshire	Brown
1871	Maxwell	Berkshire	Moore
1872	Maxwell	Berkshire	Moore

Year	Seat 1	Seat 2	Seat 3	Seat 4	Seat 5
1873	Moore	Paull	Hoffmann	A.F. Haymond	
1874	Moore	Paull	Hoffmann	A.F. Haymond	
1875	Moore	Paull	Hoffmann	A.F. Haymond	
Dec. 24	Moore	Green	Hoffmann	A.F. Haymond	
1876	Moore	Green	Hoffmann	A.F. Haymond	
Jun. 13	Moore	Green	Edmiston	A.F. Haymond	
1877	Moore	Green	Johnson	A.F. Haymond	
1878	Moore	Green	Johnson	A.F. Haymond	
1879	Moore	Green	Johnson	A.F. Haymond	
1880	Moore	Green	Johnson	A.F. Haymond	
1881	Moore	Green	Johnson	A.F. Haymond	
Jun. 1	Patton	Green	Johnson	A.F. Haymond	
1882	Patton	Green	Johnson	A.F. Haymond	
Jun. 1	Snyder	Green	Johnson	A.F. Haymond	
1883	Snyder	Green	Johnson	S. Woods	
1884	Snyder	Green	Johnson	S. Woods	
1885	Snyder	Green	Johnson	S. Woods	
1886	Snyder	Green	Johnson	S. Woods	
1887	Snyder	Green	Johnson	S. Woods	
1888	Snyder	Green	Johnson	S. Woods	
1889	Snyder	Green	Brannon	English	
Dec. 11	Snyder	Lucas	Brannon	English	
1890	Snyder	Lucas	Brannon	English	
Nov. 8	Holt	Lucas	Brannon	English	
1891	Holt	Lucas	Brannon	English	
1892	Holt	Lucas	Brannon	English	
1893	Holt	Dent	Brannon	English	
1894	Holt	Dent	Brannon	English	
1895	Holt	Dent	Brannon	English	
1896	Holt	Dent	Brannon	English	
1897	McWhorter	Dent	Brannon	English	
1898	McWhorter	Dent	Brannon	English	
1899	McWhorter	Dent	Brannon	English	
1900	McWhorter	Dent	Brannon	English	
1901	McWhorter	Dent	Brannon	Poffenbarger	
1902	McWhorter	Dent	Brannon	Poffenbarger	
1903	McWhorter	Dent	Brannon	Poffenbarger	
Jan. 17	McWhorter	Dent	Brannon	Poffenbarger	W. Miller
1904	McWhorter	Dent	Brannon	Poffenbarger	W. Miller
1905	McWhorter	Cox	Brannon	Poffenbarger	Sanders
1906	McWhorter	Cox	Brannon	Poffenbarger	Sanders
1907	McWhorter	Cox	Brannon	Poffenbarger	Sanders
Jan. 28	McWhorter	Wm. Miller	Brannon	Poffenbarger	Sanders
Oct. 15	McWhorter	Wm. Miller	Brannon	Poffenbarger	Robinson
1908	McWhorter	Wm. Miller	Brannon	Poffenbarger	Robinson
1909	Williams	Wm. Miller	Brannon	Poffenbarger	Robinson
1910	Williams	Wm. Miller	Brannon	Poffenbarger	Robinson
1911	Williams	Wm. Miller	Brannon	Poffenbarger	Robinson
1912	Williams	Wm. Miller	Brannon	Poffenbarger	Robinson
1913	Williams	Wm. Miller	Lynch	Poffenbarger	Robinson
1914	Williams	Wm. Miller	Lynch	Poffenbarger	Robinson
1915	Williams	Wm. Miller	Lynch	Poffenbarger	Robinson
Nov. 11	Williams	Wm. Miller	Lynch	Poffenbarger	Mason
1916	Williams	Wm. Miller	Lynch	Poffenbarger	Mason
1917	Williams	Wm. Miller	Lynch	Poffenbarger	Ritz
1918	Williams	Wm. Miller	Lynch	Poffenbarger	Ritz
1919	Williams	Wm. Miller	Lynch	Poffenbarger	Ritz
1920	Williams	Wm. Miller	Lynch	Poffenbarger	Ritz
1921	Lively	Wm. Miller	Lynch	Poffenbarger	Ritz
1922	Lively	Wm. Miller	Lynch	Poffenbarger	Ritz
Jan. 2	Lively	Wm. Miller	Meredith	Poffenbarger	Ritz
1923	Lively	Wm. Miller	McGinnis	Litz	Meredith
1924	Lively	Wm. Miller	McGinnis	Litz	Meredith
Nov. 4	Lively	Wm. Miller	McGinnis	Litz	Hatcher
1925	Lively	Wm. Miller	H.B. Woods	Litz	Hatcher
1926	Lively	Wm. Miller	H.B. Woods	Litz	Hatcher
1927	Lively	Wm. Miller	H.B. Woods	Litz	Hatcher
1928	Lively	Wm. Miller	H.B. Woods	Litz	Hatcher
Jun. 21	Lively	Maxwell	H.B. Woods	Litz	Hatcher
1929	Lively	Maxwell	H.B. Woods	Litz	Hatcher
1930	Lively	Maxwell	H.B. Woods	Litz	Hatcher
1931	Lively	Maxwell	H.B. Woods	Litz	Hatcher
1932	Lively	Maxwell	H.B. Woods	Litz	Hatcher
1933	Kenna	Maxwell	H.B. Woods	Litz	Hatcher
1934	Kenna	Maxwell	H.B. Woods	Litz	Hatcher
1935	Kenna	Maxwell	H.B. Woods	Litz	Hatcher
1936	Kenna	Maxwell	H.B. Woods	Litz	Hatcher
1937	Kenna	Maxwell	Riley	Fox	Hatcher
1938	Kenna	Maxwell	Riley	Fox	Hatcher
1939	Kenna	Maxwell	Riley	Fox	Hatcher
1940	Kenna	Maxwell	Riley	Fox	Hatcher
1941	Kenna	Lovins	Riley	Fox	Rose
1942	Kenna	Lovins	Riley	Fox	Rose
1943	Kenna	Lovins	Riley	Fox	Rose
1944	Kenna	Lovins	Riley	Fox	Rose
1945	Kenna	Lovins	Riley	Fox	Rose
Jul. 1	Kenna	Lovins	Riley	Fox	F.C. Haymond
1946	Kenna	Lovins	Riley	Fox	F.C. Haymond
1947	Kenna	Lovins	Riley	Fox	F.C. Haymond
1948	Kenna	Lovins	Riley	Fox	F.C. Haymond
1949	Kenna	Lovins	Riley	Fox	F.C. Haymond
1950	Kenna	Lovins	Riley	Fox	F.C. Haymond
Jan. 27	Given	Lovins	Riley	Fox	F.C. Haymond
1951	Given	Lovins	Riley	Fox	F.C. Haymond
1952	Given	Lovins	Riley	Fox	F.C. Haymond
Aug. 18	Given	Lovins	Riley	Browning	F.C. Haymond
1953	Given	Lovins	Riley	Browning	F.C. Haymond
1954	Given	Lovins	Riley	Browning	F.C. Haymond
1955	Given	Lovins	Riley	Browning	F.C. Haymond
1956	Given	Lovins	Riley	Browning	F.C. Haymond
1957	Given	Lovins	Riley	Browning	F.C. Haymond
Jan. 11	Given	Ducker	Riley	Browning	F.C. Haymond
1958	Given	Ducker	Riley	Browning	F.C. Haymond
Jul. 3	Given	Ducker	Donley	Browning	F.C. Haymond
Nov. 4	Given	Berry	Calhoun	Browning	F.C. Haymond
1959	Given	Berry	Calhoun	Browning	F.C. Haymond
1960	Given	Berry	Calhoun	Browning	F.C. Haymond
1961	Given	Berry	Calhoun	Browning	F.C. Haymond
1962	Given	Berry	Calhoun	Browning	F.C. Haymond
May 28	Caplan	Berry	Calhoun	Browning	F.C. Haymond
1963	Caplan	Berry	Calhoun	Browning	F.C. Haymond
1964	Caplan	Berry	Calhoun	Browning	F.C. Haymond
1965	Caplan	Berry	Calhoun	Browning	F.C. Haymond
1966	Caplan	Berry	Calhoun	Browning	F.C. Haymond
1967	Caplan	Berry	Calhoun	Browning	F.C. Haymond
1968	Caplan	Berry	Calhoun	Browning	F.C. Haymond
1969	Caplan	Berry	Calhoun	Browning	F.C. Haymond
1970	Caplan	Berry	Calhoun	Browning	F.C. Haymond
1971	Caplan	Berry	Calhoun	Browning	F.C. Haymond
Jul. 13	Caplan	Berry	Calhoun	Carrigan	F.C. Haymond
1972	Caplan	Berry	Calhoun	Carrigan	F.C. Haymond
Jun. 21	Caplan	Berry	Calhoun	Carrigan	Haden
Jun. 23	Caplan	Berry	Kessel	Carrigan	Haden
1973	Caplan	Berry	Neely	Sprouse	Haden
1974	Caplan	Berry	Neely	Sprouse	Haden
1975	Caplan	Berry	Neely	Sprouse	Haden
Sept. 8	Caplan	Berry	Neely	Flowers	Haden
1976	Caplan	Berry	Neely	Flowers	Haden
Jan. 26	Caplan	Berry	Neely	Flowers	Wilson
1977	Caplan	T. Miller	Neely	Harshbarger	D. McGraw
1978	Caplan	T. Miller	Neely	Harshbarger	D. McGraw
1979	Caplan	T. Miller	Neely	Harshbarger	D. McGraw
1980	Caplan	T. Miller	Neely	Harshbarger	D. McGraw
1981	McHugh	T. Miller	Neely	Harshbarger	D. McGraw
1982	McHugh	T. Miller	Neely	Harshbarger	D. McGraw
1983	McHugh	T. Miller	Neely	Harshbarger	D. McGraw
1984	McHugh	T. Miller	Neely	Harshbarger	D. McGraw
1985	McHugh	T. Miller	Neely	Brotherton	D. McGraw
1986	McHugh	T. Miller	Neely	Brotherton	D. McGraw
1987	McHugh	T. Miller	Neely	Brotherton	D. McGraw
1988	McHugh	T. Miller	Neely	Brotherton	D. McGraw
1989	McHugh	T. Miller	Neely	Brotherton	Workman
1990	McHugh	T. Miller	Neely	Brotherton	Workman
1991	McHugh	T. Miller	Neely	Brotherton	Workman
1992	McHugh	T. Miller	Neely	Brotherton	Workman
1993	McHugh	T. Miller	Neely	Brotherton	Workman
1994	McHugh	T. Miller	Neely	Brotherton	Workman
Sept. 6	McHugh	Cleckley	Neely	Brotherton	Workman
1995	McHugh	Cleckley	Neely	Brotherton	Workman
May 26	McHugh	Cleckley	Recht	Brotherton	Workman
Sept. 26	McHugh	Cleckley	Recht	Albright	Workman
1996	McHugh	Cleckley	Recht	Albright	Workman
Nov. 5	McHugh	Davis	Recht	Albright	Workman
1997	McHugh	Davis	Maynard	Starcher	Workman
1998	McHugh	Davis	Maynard	Starcher	Workman
Jan. 12	McCuskey	Davis	Maynard	Starcher	Workman
1999	W. McGraw	Davis	Maynard	Starcher	Workman
Nov. 4	W. McGraw	Davis	Maynard	Starcher	Scott
2000	W. McGraw	Davis	Maynard	Starcher	Scott
2001	W. McGraw	Davis	Maynard	Starcher	Albright
2002	W. McGraw	Davis	Maynard	Starcher	Albright
2003	W. McGraw	Davis	Maynard	Starcher	Albright
2004	W. McGraw	Davis	Maynard	Starcher	Albright
2005	Benjamin	Davis	Maynard	Starcher	Albright
2006	Benjamin	Davis	Maynard	Starcher	Albright
2007	Benjamin	Davis	Maynard	Starcher	Albright
2008	Benjamin	Davis	Maynard	Starcher	Albright
2009	Benjamin	Davis	Ketchum	Workman	Albright
Apr. 8	Benjamin	Davis	Ketchum	Workman	McHugh
2010	Benjamin	Davis	Ketchum	Workman	McHugh
2011	Benjamin	Davis	Ketchum	Workman	McHugh
2012	Benjamin	Davis	Ketchum	Workman	McHugh
2013	Benjamin	Davis	Ketchum	Workman	Loughry
2014	Benjamin	Davis	Ketchum	Workman	Loughry
2015	Benjamin	Davis	Ketchum	Workman	Loughry
2016	Benjamin	Davis	Ketchum	Workman	Loughry
2017	Walker	Davis	Ketchum	Workman	Loughry
2018	Walker	Davis	Ketchum	Workman	Loughry
Sept. 25	Walker	Armstead	Ketchum	Workman	Loughry
Oct. 1	Walker	Armstead	Jenkins	Workman	Loughry
Dec. 12	Walker	Armstead	Jenkins	Workman	Hutchison
2019	Walker	Armstead	Jenkins	Workman	Hutchison
2020	Walker	Armstead	Jenkins	Workman	Hutchison
2021	Walker	Armstead	Jenkins	Wooton	Hutchison
2022	Walker	Armstead	Jenkins	Wooton	Hutchison
Apr. 27	Walker	Armstead	Bunn	Wooton	Hutchison
2023	Walker	Armstead	Bunn	Wooton	Hutchison
2024	Walker	Armstead	Bunn	Wooton	Hutchison
2025	Walker	Armstead	Bunn	Wooton	Trump
Aug. 6	Ewing	Armstead	Bunn	Wooton	Trump
Nov. 21	Ewing	Titus	Bunn	Wooton	Trump
2026	Ewing	Titus	Bunn	Wooton	Trump
June 11–12	Flanigan	Kirkpatrick	Bunn	Wooton	Trump
