= 2008 West Virginia elections =

- November 4, 2008
- Registered: 1,212,117
- Turnout: 702,109; 57.92% ▲

West Virginia's 2008 general elections were held on November 4, 2008, with Primary elections being held on May 13, 2008. In the 2008 general election in West Virginia, Democratic candidates won 2 out of 3 U.S. House seats, all statewide executive offices, the U.S. Senate seat up for election, and majorities in both state legislative chambers.

== Federal ==
=== President ===
Republican nominee John McCain won West Virginia against Democratic nominee Barack Obama with 55.6% of the vote.

=== Senate ===
Incumbent Democratic U.S. Senator Jay Rockefeller, was re-elected, defeating Republican nominee Jay Wolfe with 63% of the vote.

=== House of Representatives ===
==== 1st congressional district ====
Democratic incumbent Alan Mollohan, who has represented the 1st district since 1983, easily won re-election as he faced no opposition, receiving 99.93% of the vote.

==== 2nd congressional district ====
Republican incumbent Shelley Moore Capito, who has represented the 2nd district since 2001, won re-election against Democratic nominee Anne Barth, receiving 57% of the vote.

==== 3rd congressional district ====
Democratic incumbent Nick Rahall, who has represented the 3rd district since 1993 (and previously represented the 4th district from 1977 to 1993) won re-election against Republican nominee Marty Gearheart, receiving 67% of the vote.

== State ==
=== Constitutional officers ===
==== Governor ====
Incumbent Democratic Governor Joe Manchin was re-elected against Republican nominee Russell E. 'Russ' Weeks Jr., receiving 70% of the vote.

==== Secretary of State ====
2008 West Virginia Secretary of State election
- November 4, 2008
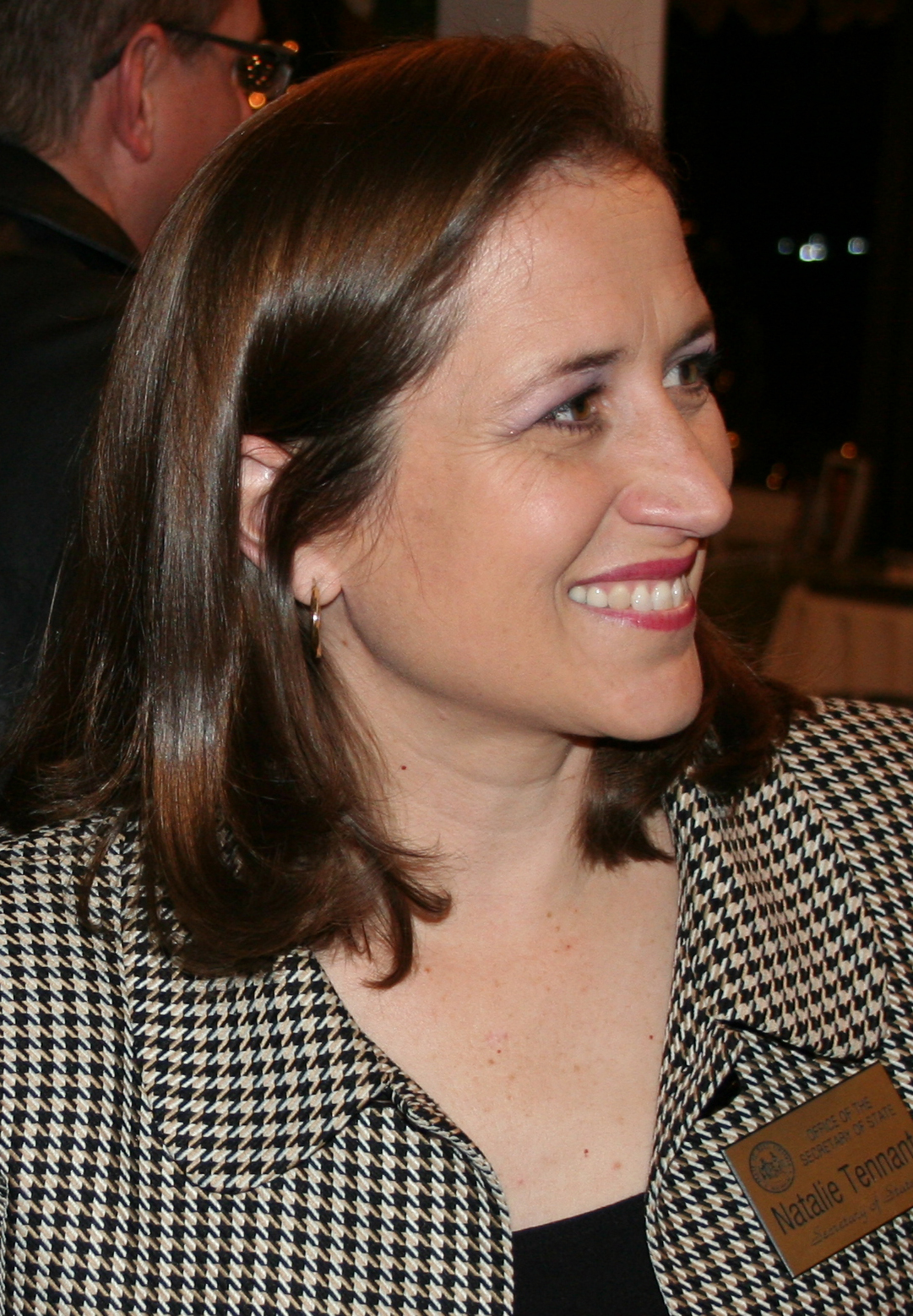

Nominee	Natalie Tennant	Charles Theophilus Minimah
Party	Democratic	Republican
Popular vote	437,430	230,283
Percentage	65.51%	34.49%
- County results Tennant: 50–60% 60–70% 70–80% 80–90% Minimah: 50–60% 60–70%
Secretary of State before election
Betty Ireland
Republican
Elected Secretary of State
Natalie Tennant
Democratic

Democrat Natalie Tennant won her first term with 65% of the vote over Republican Charles Theophilus Minimah.

West Virginia Secretary of State Election, 2008
Party	Candidate	Votes	%
Democratic	Natalie Tennant	437,430	65.51%
Republican	Charles Theophilus Minimah	230,283	34.49%
Total votes		667,713	100.00%
Democratic gain from Republican			

Democratic primary
Party	Candidate	Votes	%
Democratic	Natalie Tennant	172,458	51.38%
Democratic	Joe DeLong	120,264	35.83%
Democratic	Billy Wayne Bailey, Jr	42,902	12.78%
Total votes		335,624	100.00%

Republican primary
Party	Candidate	Votes	%
Republican	Charles Theophilus Minimah	79,000	100.00%
Total votes		79,000	100.00%

==== Attorney General ====
2008 West Virginia Attorney General election
- November 4, 2008
Nominee	Darrell McGraw	Daniel W. Greear
Party	Democratic	Republican
Popular vote	342,011	336,699
Percentage	50.39%	49.61%
- County results McGraw: 50–60% 60–70% 70–80% Greear: 50–60% 60–70%
Attorney General before election
Darrell V. McGraw, Jr.
Democratic
Elected Attorney General
Darrell V. McGraw, Jr.
Democratic

Democrat Darrell V. McGraw, Jr. (incumbent) won re-election with 50.39% of the vote over Republican Daniel W. Greear.

West Virginia Attorney General Election, 2008
Party	Candidate	Votes	%
Democratic	Darrell V. McGraw, Jr.	342,011	50.39%
Republican	Daniel W. Greear	336,699	49.61%
Total votes		678,710	100.00%
Democratic gain from Republican			

Democratic Primary
Party	Candidate	Votes	%
Democratic	Darrell V. McGraw, Jr.	172,458	100.00%
Total votes		172,458	100.00%

Republican Primary
Party	Candidate	Votes	%
Republican	Daniel W. Greear	53,121	55.60%
Republican	Hiram Lewis, IV	42,426	44.40%
Total votes		95,547	100.00%

==== Treasurer ====
Results by county Perdue: 90–100%

Democratic incumbent John Perdue, won re-election with 99.94% as he faced no opposition.

==== Auditor ====
Results by county Gainer: 90–100%

Democratic incumbent Glen Gainer III, won re-election with 99.94% as he faced no opposition.

==== Commissioner of Agriculture ====
Results by county Douglass: 50–60%; 60–70%; 70–80%; Teets: 50–60%; 60–70%; 70–80%

Democratic incumbent Gus Douglass, who has held the position of state Agriculture Commissioner since 1993 (and previously held the position from 1965 to 1989), won re-election against Republican nominee J. Michael Teets.

=== Legislature ===
==== State Senate ====
17 of the 34 members of the West Virginia Senate were up for election. The state Senate consisted of 23 Democrats and 11 Republicans. Democrats won 14 of the 17 races. This meant Democrats retained control of the State Senate and expanded that majority resulting in a 26 to 8 Democratic advantage.

==== State House of Delegates ====
All 100 members of the West Virginia House of Delegates were up for election. The state House previously consisted of 72 Democrats and 28 Republicans. Democrats won 71 of the 100 races, with Republicans gaining one seat, making the new balance of power 71–29.

== Judiciary ==
=== Supreme Court of Appeals ===
2008 West Virginia Supreme Court of Appeals election
- November 4, 2008
Nominee	Menis Ketchum	Margaret Workman
Party	Democratic	Democratic
Popular vote	355,778	336,346
Percentage	34.83%	32.93%
Nominee	Beth Walker
Party	Republican
Popular vote	329,395
Percentage	32.24%
Justices before election
Spike Maynard
Democratic
Larry Starcher
Democratic
Elected Justices
Menis Ketchum
Democratic
Margaret Workman
Democratic

Two seats were up for election on the state Supreme Court of Appeals. The electoral system requires voters to "vote for no more than two" in a single election, rather than electing each seat separately. Both seats were held by Democrats.

Incumbent Justice Larry Starcher retired while Chief Justice Spike Maynard ran for re-election, but was defeated in the Democratic primary by Margaret Workman and Menis Ketchum. Ketchum and Workman faced Republican nominee Beth Walker in the general election and defeated her with 34.83% and 32.93% respectively against Walker's 32.25%.

May 13, 2008 Democratic primary
Party	Candidate	Votes	%
Democratic	Margaret Workman	180,599	35.97%
Democratic	Menis Ketchum	135,563	27.00%
Democratic	Spike Maynard (incumbent)	97,409	19.40%
Democratic	Robert M. Bastress	88,490	17.63%
Total votes		502,061	100.00%

May 13, 2008 Republican primary
Party	Candidate	Votes	%
Republican	Beth Walker	86,545	100.00%
Total votes		86,545	100.00%

November 4, 2008 general election
Party	Candidate	Votes	%
Democratic	Menis Ketchum	355,778	34.83%
Democratic	Margaret Workman	336,346	32.93%
Republican	Beth Walker	329,395	32.24%
Total votes		1,021,519	100.00%
Democratic hold			
Democratic hold			
