= Paul T. Farrell =

American judge

Paul T. Farrell Sr. is a Circuit Judge in Cabell County, West Virginia.

Born in Huntington, West Virginia, Farrell received a B.A. from Xavier University in 1971, followed by a J.D. degree from the West Virginia University College of Law in 1978. On February 14, 2011, Governor Earl Ray Tomblin appointed Farrell to a seat on the West Virginia Sixth Judicial Circuit. One of the first matters Farrell presided over was the trial of comedian Andy Dick for felony sexual abuse charges stemming from a 2010 nightclub incident.

In 2012, Farrell dismissed a hate crime charge against a former Marshall University football player who attacked two gay men, ruling that West Virginia civil rights law does not protect people from discrimination based on sexual orientation. This ruling was later upheld in the state supreme court.

In 2013, Farrell sat by designation on the state supreme court to hear a mine safety case, in place of Justice Brent Benjamin, who was barred from hearing the case due to the involvement of a large campaign donor to Benjamin's 2004 election campaign.

Due to the criminal indictment, and subsequent conviction of Allen Loughry, Farrell was again temporarily assigned to a seat on the Supreme Court of Appeals of West Virginia by Chief Justice Margaret Workman, for the Fall Term of 2018. Workman further announced at the time that if impeachment proceedings were brought against other members of the court, Farrell would preside over these, as she and other members of the court were barred from presiding due to conflicts; fellow justice, Beth Walker, agreed with the appointment of Farrell but disputed the appropriateness of Farrell presiding over any impeachments. Under the court's custom Farrell was referred to as "Justice" in opinions it issued, as are all judges who are appointed to fill in on cases due to recusal or illness, but he does not appear on the historical roster of official justices of that court.
