= Frank Lively =

American judge (1864–1947)

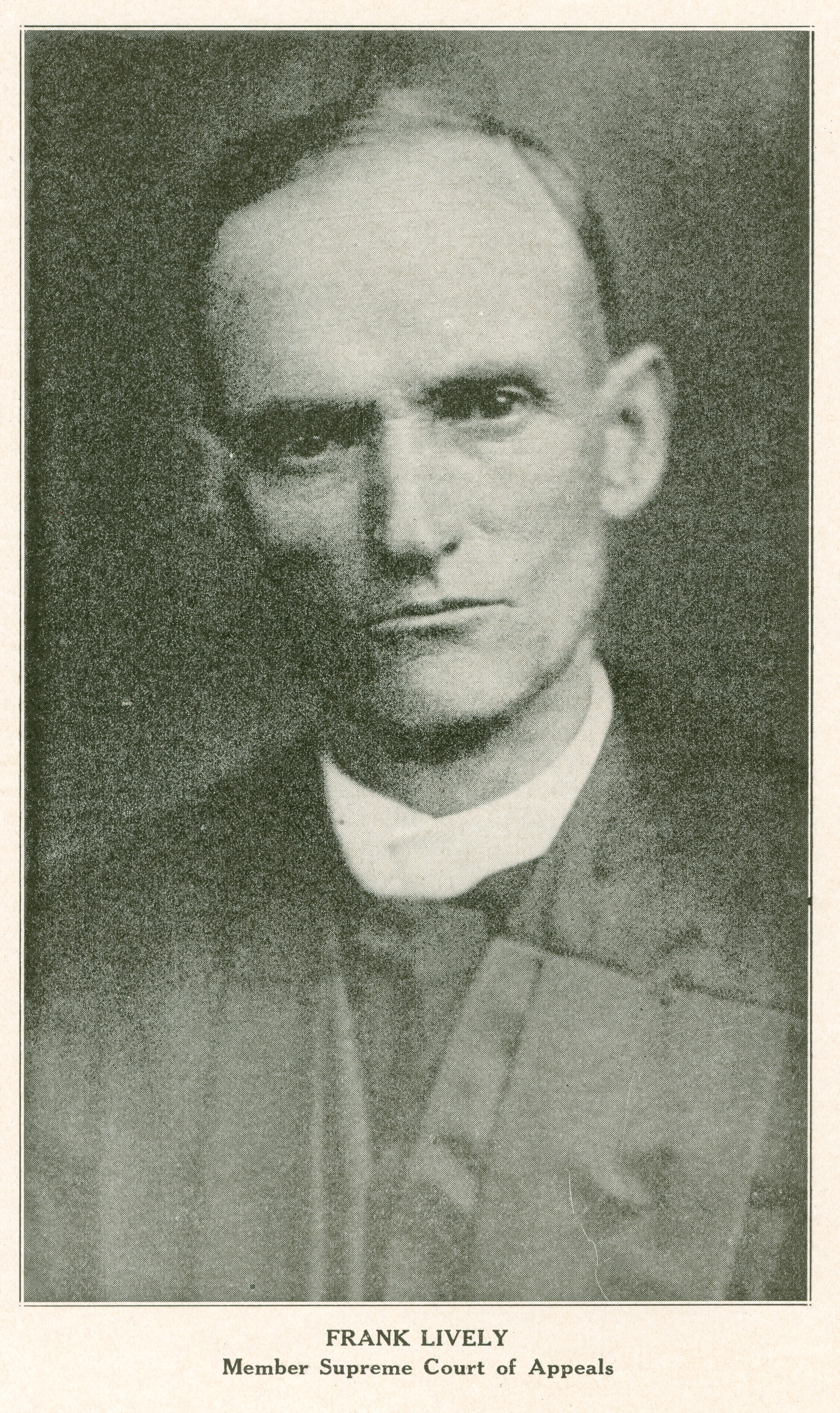
Frank Lively (1864–1947), from the 1929 West Virginia Blue Book

Frank Wilson Lively (November 18, 1864 – August 22, 1947) was a lawyer, judge, and government official in the state of West Virginia. He served as a justice of the Supreme Court of Appeals of West Virginia from January 1, 1921 to December 31, 1932.

== Early life ==
Lively was born November 18, 1864 in Lowell, West Virginia, in a cabin built by Col. James Graham, the first European settler in the area. His parents were Col. Wilson Lively (1815–1865), a Confederate officer, and Elizabeth Lively (née Gwinn, 1823–1894), a descendant of the second family to settle in Lowell. Lively attended local schools, Concord State Normal School, and the West Virginia University School of Law, graduating in 1885.

== Career ==
In 1886, Lively was admitted to the bar and set up practice in Hinton. In 1900, he was elected prosecuting attorney for Summers County. Before completing his four year term, he resigned to take the newly created position of state fish and game warden, appointed by governor Albert B. White. After about a year he resigned to take up the position of assistant state attorney general in 1905. A year later he left that position to become the state pardon attorney, a position he held for three years before returning to the position of assistant state attorney general in 1909, remaining in that job until 1920.

In 1920, he was the successful Republican nominee for a twelve year term on the Supreme Court of Appeals of West Virginia.

In 1922, after an appeal funded by the Charleston NAACP, Lively ordered a new trial for a Black man named James Lattimer who had been convicted of raping a white child and sentenced to death within twenty-four hours of his arrest. Lively wrote, "A judicial lynching is a graver and more startling crime than a lynching by an irresponsible rabble. It undermines the foundation of orderly government and weakens respect for law and order."

In 1932, he was nominated for a second term by his party but lost to Democrat John Kenna in a year that saw many Democrats elected statewide and Roosevelt win the state's electoral votes. After his term on the court he returned to private practice, this time in Charleston, with his son William T. Lively.

== Personal life ==
Lively married Annie Elizabeth Prince (1868–1952) in 1890. They had at least five children—sons William Thompson Lively (1891–1955), James Prince Lively (1893–1982), Frank Wilson Lively (1895–1920), and Frederick Lively (1898–1953), and a daughter, Mrs. C. M. Fontaine.

Lively had a heart attack during a summer stay at the old family homestead in Lowell, but was able to drive himself to a hospital in Hinton. While a patient there he suffered a second heart attack and died August 22, 1947, at the age of 82. He is buried in the Spring Hill Cemetery in Charleston.

Political offices
Preceded by L. Judson Williams	Justice of the Supreme Court of Appeals of West Virginia; 1921–1932	Succeeded by J. N. Kenna
