= 1992 West Virginia Supreme Court of Appeals election =

- November 7, 1992
Nominee	Thomas McHugh
Party	Democratic
Popular vote	421,141
Percentage	100.00%
- County results McHugh: 100%
Justice before election
Thomas McHugh
Democratic
Elected Justice
Thomas McHugh
Democratic

The 1992 West Virginia Supreme Court of Appeals election took place on November 7, 1992, to elect a Justice of the Supreme Court of Appeals of West Virginia for the next 12 years.

Incumbent Democratic Justice Thomas McHugh won re-election for another 12 year term on the court unopposed, as the Republicans did not field a candidate.

== Democratic primary ==
=== Candidates ===
==== Nominee ====
- Thomas McHugh, incumbent Justice of the Supreme Court of Appeals.

=== Results ===
1992 Democratic primary
Party	Candidate	Votes	%
Democratic	Thomas McHugh (incumbent)	229,454	23.88%
Total votes		229,454	100.00%

== General election ==
=== Results ===
1992 West Virginia Supreme Court of Appeals election
Party	Candidate	Votes	%
Democratic	Thomas McHugh (incumbent)	421,141	100.00%
Total votes		421,141	100.00%
Democratic hold			
