= Robin Davis =

American judge (born 1956)

Justice of the Supreme Court of Appeals of West Virginia
- In office December 16, 1996 – August 13, 2018
- Preceded by: Franklin Cleckley
- Succeeded by: Evan Jenkins

Personal details
- Born: April 6, 1956 (age 70) Boone County, West Virginia, U.S.
- Spouse: Scott Segal
- Education: West Virginia Wesleyan College (BA); West Virginia University (MA, JD)

Robin Jean Davis (born April 6, 1956) is an American jurist who served on the Supreme Court of Appeals of West Virginia. First elected to fill an unexpired term in 1996, Davis later won full twelve-year terms in 2000 and 2012. However, Davis retired before the end of her second full term in August 2018 after the West Virginia House Judiciary Committee named Davis in articles of impeachment during the Impeachment of the Supreme Court of Appeals of West Virginia.

== Early life ==
Davis was born in Boone County, West Virginia. She received a bachelor's degree from West Virginia Wesleyan College in 1978, and master's and law degrees from West Virginia University in 1982.

== Career ==
From 1982 until 1996, Davis practiced law in West Virginia, concentrating on employee benefits and domestic relations. In 1996 she was elected to fill an unexpired term, and was re-elected to a full twelve-year term in 2000 and 2012; becoming the first woman re-elected to statewide office in West Virginia. Davis served one year terms as chief justice in 1998, 2002, 2006, 2007, 2010 and 2014.

== Impeachment and retirement ==
Following a series of controversies involving excessive spending, the West Virginia House Judiciary Committee voted to recommend impeachment for Davis and three other justices on August 7, 2018 "for maladministration, corruption, incompetency, neglect of duty, and certain high crimes and misdemeanors".

After the articles of impeachment were approved by the full House of Delegates, Justice Davis announced her retirement from the Court, effective August 13, 2018. The timing allowed her seat to be filled through a special election rather than enabling Governor Jim Justice to appoint her successor in the event the West Virginia Senate removed her from office.

Despite her retirement, the West Virginia Senate refused to dismiss the articles of impeachment against Justice Davis due to questions about her standing as a senior status judge as well as her eligibility to receive judicial retirement benefits. The Senate scheduled her impeachment trial for October 2018.

== Media attention ==
Davis is featured in Laurence Leamer's 2013 non-fiction book, The Price of Justice: A True Story of Greed and Corruption in Coal Country. In December 2014, ABC News reported on controversies surrounding Robin Davis: her ties to attorney Michael Fuller, who helped her raise $37,000 for her campaign; and the sale of a Lear Jet by her husband Scott Segal. The investigation raises questions about conflicts of interest and ethical decisions made by the then-Chief Justice.

== Private life ==
Davis is married to Scott Segal. They have one son, Oliver.

== Elections ==
Fall 2012: Davis and Chafin faced Republicans Allen Loughry, a law clerk for Democratic Supreme Court Justice Margaret Workman, and Jefferson County Circuit Judge John Yoder in the November general election. Loughry and Yoder were unopposed for the Republican nomination as they were the only two Republican candidates in the primary. Yoder was also the unsuccessful Republican nominee against Davis in 2000. Despite coinciding with the fourth consecutive presidential election where the Republican candidate won statewide, Davis came in first place in the November general election to secure re-election to a second full term in office. Davis was re-elected alongside Loughry, who was elected to his first term in office. Although Davis' re-election ensured the Court maintained its longstanding Democratic majority, with the election of Loughry, the Court had two elected Republicans for the first time since 1940.

Supreme Court of Appeals, 2012 General Election results
Party	Candidate	Votes	%
Democratic	Robin Davis (incumbent)	294,882	27.16%
Republican	Allen Loughry	284,299	26.19%
Republican	John C. Yoder	258,213	23.78%
Democratic	Letitia 'Tish' Chafin	248,284	22.87%
Total votes		1,085,678	100.0%

Spring 2012: Two seats were up for election on the state Supreme Court of Appeals. The electoral system required voters to "vote for no more than two" in a single election, rather than electing each seat separately. Both seats were held by Democrats. Davis, who was first elected in 2000, ran for re-election, while Justice Thomas McHugh, kept his pledge to not seek a full term. McHugh had previously served on the court from 1980 to 1997, and was appointed and then elected to an unexpired term in 2008.

In the May Democratic primary, Davis faced Wood County Circuit Judge J.D. Beane; Letitia 'Tish' Chafin, a lawyer and wife of state Senator H. Truman Chafin; Louis Palmer, a Supreme Court clerk; H. John "Buck" Rogers, a lawyer; and, Greenbrier County Circuit Judge Jim Rowe. Chafin and Davis received the Democratic nomination.

Supreme Court of Appeals, 2012 Democratic Primary Election results
Party	Candidate	Votes	%
Democratic	Robin Davis (incumbent)	83,071	27.90%
Democratic	Letitia 'Tish' Chafin	80,393	27.00%
Democratic	James 'Jim' Rowe	59,185	19.88%
Democratic	J.D. Beane	30,543	10.26%
Democratic	H. John 'Buck' Rogers	27,374	9.19%
Democratic	Louis Palmer	17,149	5.76%
Total votes		297,715	100.0%

Fall 2000: Democratic nominees Albright and Davis faced former state senator John Yoder in the November general election. Yoder ran unopposed for the Republican nomination. Because Yoder was the only Republican nominee, either Albright or Davis was guaranteed to be elected and return as a Justice. Yoder, a native Kansan, was previously a district court judge in Kansas. After moving to West Virginia, Yoder was also the unsuccessful Republican nominee for U.S. Senate in 1990, losing to incumbent Democratic Senator Jay Rockefeller. Albright and Davis easily beat Yoder, who would also lose another race for the Supreme Court against Davis in 2012. After his loss, Yoder eventually returned to the State Senate in 2005 and was elected as a circuit court judge for the Twenty-Third Judicial Circuit (covering Berkeley, Jefferson and Morgan Counties) in 2008. Davis' re-election in 2000 made her the first woman to be re-elected statewide in West Virginia.

Supreme Court of Appeals, 2000 General Election results
Party	Candidate	Votes	%
Democratic	Joseph Albright	366,833	50.00%
Democratic	Robin Davis (incumbent)	309,804	34.62%
Republican	John C. Yoder	218,195	24.38%
Total votes		894,832	100.0%

Spring 2000: In the historically Democratic state, Davis faced off in a four-way primary for two seats on the Supreme Court in a race that was tantamount to the general election as a Republican had not been elected to the Supreme Court since 1930. Elected to an unexpired term in 1996 after the retirement of appointed Justice Franklin Cleckley, Davis faced former justice Joseph Albright, Delegate and attorney Evan Jenkins, and WVU Law professor and constitutional law scholar Bob Bastress. Albright and Davis handily won the nominations to advance to the November general election. Jenkins would later switch to the Republican party to become the congressman for West Virginia's 3rd congressional district and be appointed to Davis' seat in 2018 after her resignation during the Impeachment of the Supreme Court of Appeals of West Virginia.

Supreme Court of Appeals, 2000 Democratic Primary Election results
Party	Candidate	Votes	%
Democratic	Joseph Albright	131,948	34.40%
Democratic	Robin Davis (incumbent)	108,230	28.21%
Democratic	Evan Jenkins	73,876	19.26%
Democratic	Bob Bastress	69,565	18.13%
Total votes		383,619	100.0%

Fall 1996: In the November general election, Davis faced Republican nominee and Cabell County attorney David Pancake. Davis easily beat Pancake 59-41%, a nearly 20% margin. After his loss, Pancake was appointed as a circuit court judge by then-Governor Cecil Underwood in 1998. Pancake would go on to win re-election as a circuit court judge that same year to an unexpired term, before winning election to full terms in 2000 and 2008. Davis' election made her just the second woman on the Supreme Court and second woman elected to statewide office in West Virginia, after Justice Margaret Workman.

Supreme Court of Appeals, 1996 General Election results
Party	Candidate	Votes	%
Democratic	Robin Davis	318,955	59.4%
Republican	David Pancake	217,772	40.6%
Total votes		536,727	100.0%

Spring 1996: In the historically Democratic state, Davis faced off in a three-way primary for an unexpired term on the Supreme Court in a race that was tantamount to the general election as a Republican had not been elected to the Supreme Court since 1930. The seat was open following the retirement of appointed Justice Franklin Cleckley. Davis, a Charleston attorney, faced former Mineral County Prosecuting Attorney and Martinsburg attorney Danny Staggers, and McDowell County circuit court judge Booker T. Stephens. Davis won the nomination with a healthy plurality of the vote to advance to the November general election.

Supreme Court of Appeals, 1996 Democratic Primary Election results
Party	Candidate	Votes	%
Democratic	Robin Davis	121,569	45.0%
Democratic	Danny Staggers	93,658	34.7%
Democratic	Booker T. Stephens	54,813	20.3%
Total votes		463,991	100.0%

Legal offices
Preceded by Franklin Cleckley	Justice for the Supreme Court of Appeals of West Virginia; 1996–2018	Succeeded by Evan Jenkins
