= Impeachment of the Supreme Court of Appeals of West Virginia =

2018 action by the House of Delegates

The impeachment of the Supreme Court of Appeals of West Virginia occurred on August 13, 2018, when the West Virginia House of Delegates voted to impeach all five justices of the Supreme Court of Appeals of West Virginia for charges relating to corruption, overspending, and lack of oversight. Despite being threatened in other states at other times, this is the only time in United States history that the entire bench of the highest court of a state has been impeached.

Of the five justices who were investigated:

- Justice Menis Ketchum resigned before impeachment, pled guilty in federal court to one count of wire fraud, and had his license to practice law annulled and was sentenced to three years probation and fined.
- Chief Justice Allen Loughry was removed as chief justice, suspended from the court, impeached on seven charges, convicted of 11 charges, resigned before being tried for removal from office and sentenced to 24 months in prison.
- Justice Robin Davis was impeached on three charges, retired on August 14 — retroactively effective August 13 — and was not tried in the Senate due to an injunction from the temporarily reconstituted Supreme Court.
- Justice Beth Walker was impeached on two charges, voted to not be removed 32-1-1 on October 2, and remained on the court.
- Justice Margaret Workman was impeached on two charges, not tried in the Senate due to an injunction from the Supreme Court, and remained on the court.

In the end, only Justices Walker and Workman remained in their positions, while Justices Loughry and Ketchum resigned and were federally tried, and Justice Davis retired.

== Justices in 2018 ==
Office	Justice	Assumed office	Impeachment	Left office	Result
Chief Justice	Allen Loughry	January 1, 2013	August 7, 2018	November 12, 2018	Resigned, convicted of wire fraud and mail fraud
Justice	Margaret Workman	January 1, 2009	August 7, 2018	December 31, 2020	Trial blocked by courts
Justice	Beth Walker	January 1, 2017	August 7, 2018	June 27, 2025	Acquitted, reprimand and censure
Justice	Menis Ketchum	January 1, 2009		July 27, 2018	Resigned; pled guilty to wire fraud
Justice	Robin Davis	December 16, 1996	August 7, 2018	August 13, 2018	Resigned

== Background ==
In late 2017, WCHS-TV and other media outlets began reporting on spending by the Supreme Court of Appeals of West Virginia. Eventually, an investigation by the office of the United States Attorney for the Southern District of West Virginia was launched, and the court was audited by the state's legislative auditor.

== Investigation ==
The legislative auditor found multiple irregularities in the court's practices including undocumented and commuting use of court-owned vehicles and the improper purchase of gift cards. Significant public attention was centered on spending for expensive office renovations, including a $32,000 couch for Justice Allen Loughry, and Loughry's use of an original Cass Gilbert-designed desk from the State Capitol at his home. Justice Menis Ketchum was reported to have used a state vehicle to travel from his home in Huntington to work, and for several vacation trips, without paying tax on the fringe benefit. Justice Ketchum then had his income tax amended to pay the back tax and repaid the state over $1600 for the issue.

Early in 2018, the other four justices voted to remove Loughry from his position as chief justice when they became aware he had withheld the existence of a federal grand jury subpoena from them. On June 6, 2018, Loughry was charged with 32 violations of the state Code of Judicial Conduct. The Supreme Court, reconstituted with four circuit judges and a retired circuit judge appointed for that purpose, suspended Loughry without pay until further notice as a result of these charges.

On June 20, 2018 (West Virginia Day), Michael B. Stuart, the United States Attorney for the Southern District of West Virginia, announced a 22 count indictment against Loughry. He was sentenced to nearly 24 months in prison.

== Impeaching the entire court ==
On June 26, 2018, the West Virginia House of Delegates assembled in special session to consider Loughry's or any other justice's impeachment. The matter was referred to the House Judiciary Committee. In the course of its investigation, additional issues were discovered relative to splitting the pay of "senior status judges", who are retired judges filling in certain circumstances and who can make no more than 25% of an active judges' salary, between IRS Form W-2 and Form 1099 in order to circumvent that rule; and of the court purchasing "working lunches" at taxpayer expense on a regular basis.

On July 11, 2018, Justice Ketchum resigned from the court. On July 31, 2018, he entered a guilty plea in the United States District Court for the Southern District of West Virginia in Charleston to one count of wire fraud. Because of his guilty plea to a felony, the Supreme Court of Appeals annulled Ketchum's license to practice law in the state of West Virginia on October 4, 2018.

On August 7, 2018, the House Judiciary Committee recommended that all four remaining justices be impeached. Loughry for lack of oversight, improper removal of the desk to his home, improper use of a government computer, improper use of state owned cars for personal travel, overspending on his office decorations, the overpaying of "senior status judges" and lying to the Legislature; Chief Justice Margaret Workman and Justice Robin Davis for overpaying of "senior status judges", lack of oversight, and overspending; and Justice Beth Walker for lack of oversight and overspending. On August 13, 2018, the full House of Delegates impeached the four remaining members of the court. On August 14, 2018, Davis retired from the court, effective August 13, 2018. The justices, other than Justice Walker who had already been tried, awaited trial on the impeachment in the West Virginia Senate.

== Trials ==
The West Virginia Senate met on Monday, August 20, 2018, to receive the articles of impeachment from the House of Delegates and approve the rules governing the impeachment trials. In addition, the Senate confirmed that Cabell County Circuit Judge Paul Farrell, who had been temporarily designated by the Supreme Court to fill in for Loughry, was to preside over all of the trials. The Senate also voted to try each of the justices separately with Farrell determining the order.

=== Pretrial hearing ===
On September 11, 2018, the West Virginia Senate debated and voted on a number of preliminary issues for the four trials. Several motions had to do with Judge Davis, who had already retired. It was voted to try her anyway by votes of 19–15 on several resolutions. Then the Senate "dissolved" into a court of impeachment and set trial dates and other housekeeping matters. A resolution substituting censure for full trials for Workman and Walker was ruled out of order.

=== Trial of Justice Walker ===
Justice Walker's impeachment trial began on October 1. The trial concluded on October 2 with the Senate voting 32–1 to acquit her, with only Senator Stephen Baldwin of Greenbrier County voting for conviction and Senator Ryan Weld of Brooke County absent. The Senate followed by agreeing, by voice vote, to publicly "reprimand and censure" Justice Walker for her actions in the scandal.

=== Trial of Justice Workman ===
Justice Workman's impeachment trial was scheduled to begin on October 15. However, on October 11, the Supreme Court of Appeals, temporarily reconstituted with five circuit court judges, issued an injunction blocking the impeachment trial, stating that the articles of impeachment presented by the House of Delegates against Workman violated the separation of powers doctrine and, therefore, the Senate has no jurisdiction to try Workman on the impeachment. The court said that the sole authority to enforce the Canon of the West Virginia Code of Judicial Conduct rested with the judicial branch.

Judge Farrell stated that he would not preside over Justice Workman's trial while the injunction was in place. The Senate met on October 15 and adjourned with no final decision on how to proceed being made. Senate President Mitch Carmichael announced after the session had adjourned that the Senate would ask the Supreme Court of Appeals to reconsider their decision, but after Loughry's resignation, further impeachment efforts against Workman were dropped.

=== Trial of former Justice Davis ===
Former Justice Davis' trial was scheduled to begin on October 29. However, the reconstituted Supreme Court of Appeals ruled on October 25 that the injunction blocking Justice Workman's trial also retroactively applied to Justice Davis' and Justice Loughry's trials. In light of the court's decision and Loughry's resignation, further impeachment efforts against Davis are doubtful.

=== Trials of Justice Loughry ===
==== Impeachment ====
The impeachment trial for Justice Loughry was set for November 12. However, the reconstituted Supreme Court of Appeals ruled on October 25 that the injunction blocking Justice Workman's trial also retroactively applied to Justice Davis' and Justice Loughry's trial. Delegate Andrew Byrd of Kanawha County, who is serving as one of the impeachment managers, is asking Gov. Jim Justice to call the House of Delegates into special session on November 11–13 to draft new impeachment articles against Loughry based solely on his federal criminal convictions (see below).

==== Federal criminal trial ====
Justice Loughry's federal criminal trial began on October 2. This trial concluded on October 12 with Loughry being convicted of seven counts of wire fraud, one count of mail fraud, one count of witness tampering and two counts of lying to the FBI. The jury found Loughry not guilty on nine counts of wire fraud and two counts of mail fraud while they deadlocked on one count of wire fraud. Loughry, who remained on the court until resigning on November 12, 2018, was sentenced to 24 months in federal prison on February 13, 2019. He was released from FCI Williamsburg on December 19, 2020.

== Aftermath ==
Justice Ketchum's seat and Justice Davis' seat were ultimately filled in separate special elections which were held alongside the 2018 general election on November 6, 2018. On August 25, 2018, Governor Jim Justice appointed Tim Armstead, former Speaker of the House of Delegates and Evan Jenkins, U.S. Representative for West Virginia's 3rd congressional district, to the two vacant seats until the special elections. Armstead took Ketchum's seat while Jenkins took Davis' seat with both having already filed to run in the November special elections. Armstead and Jenkins were required to observe a mandatory twenty day waiting period in which the members of the public can file official objections to the appointments prior to taking their seats. This waiting period ended on September 19, 2018. Armsted took the oath of office and assumed his seat on September 25, 2018, while Jenkins resigned from the House of Representatives on September 30, 2018, and took his seat on the court on October 1, 2018.

In accordance with Chapter 3, Section 10 of the West Virginia Code, any further vacancies were filled by interim justices appointed by Governor Justice. Barring any changes by the Legislature, these interim justices served until the primary election in May 2020, when a special election was held. This became the case with Loughry's resignation, as on December 12, 2018, Justice appointed John A. Hutchison, a lifelong friend and circuit judge in Raleigh County, to Loughry's vacated seat.
