= Fred H. Caplan =

American judge (1914–2004)

Fred Harry Caplan (December 3, 1914 – March 4, 2004) was a justice of the Supreme Court of Appeals of West Virginia from 1962 to 1980.

Born in Asheville, North Carolina, Caplan graduated from West Virginia University and the University of Richmond School of Law. He served in the United States Army in the Pacific theatre of World War II. Afterwards, he entered private practice in Clarksburg, West Virginia, in association with his brother Howard. Caplan was twice elected to the West Virginia House of Delegates, and also served as an assistant attorney general and as chair of the Public Service Commission before being appointed to a seat on the West Virginia Supreme Court of Appeals vacated by the death of Leslie E. Given. After retiring from the court, Caplan served for a time as chair of the West Virginia Ethics Commission.

Caplan died in an Asheville hospital at the age of 89.

Political offices
Preceded by Leslie E. Given	Justice of the Supreme Court of Appeals of West Virginia; 1962–1980	Succeeded by Thomas E. McHugh
