= Thornton G. Berry Jr. =

American judge (1904–1987)

Thornton Granville Berry Jr. (December 13, 1904 – November 27, 1987) was a justice of the Supreme Court of Appeals of West Virginia from November 4, 1958 to December 31, 1976.

Berry was born in Sutton, West Virginia, the son of Thornton G. Berry and Mamie Newton née Kawalski Berry. Berry attended the schools of Charleston, West Virginia, and then he Tennessee Military Institute, Augusta Military Academy, and Virginia Military Institute. He studied law at Washington and Lee University, thereafter entering private practice, and served as a prosecutor and an assistant United States Attorney.

Berry served in the U.S. Navy during World War II, from 1942 to 1946. He was a Democrat.

Political offices
Preceded by Henry L. Ducker	Justice of the Supreme Court of Appeals of West Virginia; 1958–1976	Succeeded by Thomas B. Miller
