= Christopher Wilkes =

American judge

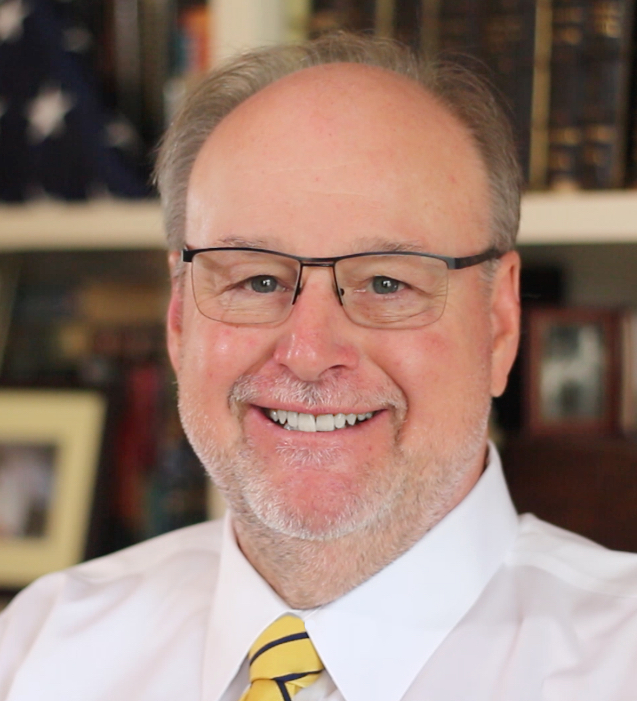

Chief Judge, 23rd Judicial Circuit of West Virginia
- Incumbent
- Assumed office January 1, 1993

Personal details
- Spouse: Pat Wilkes
- Education: West Virginia University (B.A. 1980); Ohio Northern University Pettit College of Law (J.D. 1982)

Christopher C. Wilkes is the former chief judge for West Virginia's then-largest Circuit Court, the 23rd Judicial Circuit, encompassing Morgan, Jefferson, and Berkeley counties, and currently serves as a senior status judge in that court's Business Court Division. Wilkes was first elected to the 23rd Judicial Circuit in 1992, and was elected again in 2000, 2008, and 2016. He announced his retirement as an elected judge in December 2018, and has continued serving as a senior status judge by appointment of the Supreme Court of Appeals of West Virginia. In 2018, he unsuccessfully sought election to the Supreme Court of Appeals of West Virginia, placing third among ten candidates.

Wilkes was the first chair of West Virginia’s specialized Business Court Division, serving in that position from 2012 through January 2019. He has continued to serve in the Business Court Division as a senior status judge. Wilkes served as a municipal court judge from 1985 until becoming a Circuit Court judge in 1993. He has served West Virginia for over 40 years in his various judicial capacities. Among other things, in 2023, Wilkes served as the common fund manager in West Virginia's opioid litigation.

== Education ==
In 1980, Wilkes received his undergraduate degree from West Virginia University, where he studied political science. He received a Juris Doctor degree from the Ohio Northern University Pettit College of Law in 1982. He was inducted into the Willis Society of Legal Scholars at Ohio Northern, being among the top 10 percent of his class.

== Legal career ==
Wilkes worked as an attorney in private practice in Martinsburg, West Virginia. From 1983 to 1993, he was a partner in the Wilkes & Wilkes law firm in Martinsburg. He served as a municipal judge for the cities of Martinsburg and Ranson in West Virginia from 1985 to 1993.

Wilkes was elected to the 23rd Judicial Circuit Court in West Virginia in 1992 (West Virginia's largest Circuit Court covering Berkeley, Jefferson, and Morgan Counties), and was re-elected in 2000, 2008, and 2016. During part of his over 25-year tenure on the court as an elected judge, Wilkes served as its chief judge, through a peer selection process. In 2011, Wilkes was among the West Virginia judges serving on a committee studying the creation of a business court in West Virginia, which began operations one year later, with its headquarters in Martinsburg. Wilkes served as the first chair of West Virginia's Business Court Division from 2012 to 2018.

Wilkes announced his retirement in December 2018, and retired as an elected judge in January 2019; serving as chair of the Business Court Division until January 31, 2019. He was appointed a circuit court senior status judge by a mid-January 2019 administrative order of the Supreme Court of Appeals of West Virginia. Soon after, Wilkes was authorized by the Supreme Court of Appeals to continue as a Business Court Division judge until October 9, 2019, which was later extended to December 31, 2024. In early December 2024, Wilkes was reappointed by the Supreme Court of Appeals to serve an additional term as a senior status judge and to continue serving in the Business Court Division, through the end of 2031. In 2023, he served as the common benefit fund manager in West Virginia's opioid litigation, after previously serving as discovery commissioner in the opioid litigation.

During his time on the judiciary, Wilkes served as president of the West Virginia Judicial Association. He was co-chairman of the Youth Services Committee of the Court Improvement Board, and a member of the Judges Initiative Committee of the Business Law Section of the American Bar Association. He also served as a member of West Virginia's Judicial Investigation Commission, and was a West Virginia Bar Foundation Fellow. He also served as a Business Court Representative to the American Bar Association's Business Law Section. Wilkes filed to run for the Supreme Court of Appeals of West Virginia on August 20, 2018, and came in third among 10 candidates (with 13% of the vote, the winner Tim Armstead gaining 26% of the vote).

== Personal life ==
Wilkes's daughter Catie Wilkes-Delligatti was elected twice to serve as the Prosecuting Attorney in Berkeley County, West Virginia. In 2024, she was elected to serve as a judge in the Twenty-Seventh Judicial Circuit (encompassing Berkeley and Morgan Counties). This court came into existence on January 1, 2025, in a realignment of West Virginia's Circuit Courts.
