= Federal Correctional Institution, Williamsburg =

Medium-security prison in South Carolina, US

FCI Williamsburg
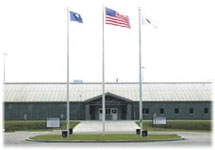
- Interactive map of FCI Williamsburg
- Location: Salters, South Carolina; 33.5869°N 79.8795°W
- Status: Operational
- Security class: Medium-security (with minimum-security prison camp)
- Population: 1,700 (150 in prison camp)
- Managed by: Federal Bureau of Prisons

The Federal Correctional Institution, Williamsburg (FCI Williamsburg) is a medium-security United States federal prison for male inmates in Salters, South Carolina. It is run by the Federal Bureau of Prisons, a division of the United States Department of Justice. It has an adjacent prison camp for minimum-security male offenders.

FCI Williamsburg is located in the town of Salters 90 miles southeast of Columbia, the state capital.

== Notable events ==
On October 27, 2010, US Attorney General Eric Holder presented an Outstanding Contribution Award to Henry R. Mills, an air conditioning equipment mechanical supervisor at FCI Williamsburg. Mills developed more efficient means of cooling 18 ice machines in use at the facility, lessening their environmental impact via a reduction of more than 2.5 million gallons of water annually. This resulted in a savings of more than $100,000 in Bureau of Prisons funds.

== Notable inmates ==
Inmate name	Register number	Status	Details
Farid Fata	48860-039	Serving a 45-year sentence; scheduled for release in 2050.	Former oncologist; pleaded guilty in 2015 to healthcare fraud, receiving kickbacks and money laundering for administering unnecessary chemotherapy to 553 cancer patients and filing fraudulent claims in order to make millions of dollars in profit for personal use.
Art Schlichter	30044-048	Served a 10-year sentence; released in 2020.	Former NFL player and compulsive gambler; pleaded guilty in 2011 to wire fraud, bank fraud, and filing a false tax return in connection with defrauding dozens of people of over $1 million under the pretense of obtaining football tickets.
Allen Loughry	15022-088	Sentenced to 2 years, released on December 19, 2020 after 22 months in prison.	Former Chief Justice of the Supreme Court of Appeals of West Virginia; convicted of 10 charges including mail and wire fraud.
Amine El Khalifi	79748-083	Serving a 30-year sentence; scheduled for release in 2037.	Al-Qaeda supporter; pleaded guilty in June 2012 to attempted use of a weapon of mass destruction for plotting to conduct a suicide bombing at the US Capitol Building in Washington, DC in February 2012.

== See also ==
- List of U.S. federal prisons
- Federal Bureau of Prisons
- Incarceration in the United States
