= Larry Starcher =

American judge (1942–2022)

Larry V. Starcher

Justice of the Supreme Court of Appeals of West Virginia
- In office January 1, 1997 – December 31, 2008
- Preceded by: Joseph Albright
- Succeeded by: Margaret Workman

Judge of 17th Circuit Court of West Virginia
- In office 1977–1996

Personal details
- Born: September 25, 1942 Roane County, West Virginia, U.S.
- Died: December 24, 2022 (aged 80)
- Education: West Virginia University

Larry Victor Starcher (September 25, 1942 – December 24, 2022) was an American jurist who was a justice of the Supreme Court of Appeals of West Virginia. In November 1996, he was elected as a Democrat in a partisan election to the Supreme Court of Appeals. He served as chief justice in 1999 and 2003.

== Education ==
A native of Roane County, West Virginia, Starcher earned his Bachelor of Arts in 1964 from West Virginia University and his Juris Doctor in 1967 from the West Virginia University College of Law.

== Career ==
Prior to being elected as a circuit judge of Monongalia County in 1976, he served as an assistant to the Vice-President for Off-Campus Education at WVU, as director of the North Central West Virginia Legal Aid Society, and as a private lawyer. He served as circuit judge for 20 years (1977-1996), including 18 as chief judge. While sitting as a circuit judge, Starcher served as a special judge in 23 of West Virginia’s 55 counties. He presided over the trial of 20,000 asbestos injury cases and a six-month state buildings asbestos trial.

In November 1996, he was elected to the Supreme Court of Appeals as a Democrat in a partisan election. He served as chief justice in 1999, and 2003. He promoted action in several areas of judicial administration, specifically: court facilities committee; public trust and confidence in the judiciary; mental hygiene commission; court technology summit; self-represented litigants task force; state law library improvements; and reactivated the gender fairness task force.

Starcher had been highly critical of the actions of the executive of a coal company who had business before the court, which led to him recusing himself in at least some decisions involving that company. He criticized a fellow Justice who won election with large contributions from the coal company executive and then cast deciding votes in favor of the company. The situation led to a U. S. Supreme Court case, Caperton v. A.T. Massey Coal Co., about when judges should recuse themselves.

== Death ==
Starcher died on December 24, 2022, at the age of 80.

== Awards and associations ==
Starcher was president of the West Virginia Judicial Association in 1992 and 1993. As a trial judge, he was active in the area of juvenile justice, including establishing alternative learning centers for youths at risk and a youth shelter. He also pioneered the use of work-release and community service as punishment for nonviolent offenders. He was a regular instructor at judicial conferences, and was honored by many civic and community groups, including the NAACP, Jaycees, Trial Lawyers, and Probation Officers. In 1978, he was a Fellow of the National Endowment for the Humanities at Harvard University. Starcher also served as an adjunct lecturer at the West Virginia University College of Law from 1992.

== Popular culture ==
In 2007, Starcher was cast as a jury member in the Marshall University courtroom drama, J.R. Clifford and the Carrie Williams Case. He was alongside Arley Johnson, Stephen J. Kopp, and David Felinton.

Legal offices
Preceded by Joseph P. Albright	Justice for the Supreme Court of Appeals of West Virginia; 1997–2008	Succeeded by Margaret Workman
