= John A. Hutchison =

American judge (born 1950)

John Hutchison

Chief Justice of the West Virginia Supreme Court of Appeals
- In office January 1, 2022 – December 31, 2022
- Preceded by: Evan Jenkins
- Succeeded by: Beth Walker

Justice of the West Virginia Supreme Court of Appeals
- In office December 12, 2018 – January 1, 2025
- Appointed by: Jim Justice
- Preceded by: Paul Farrell (acting)
- Succeeded by: Charles S. Trump

Personal details
- Born: 1950 (age 74–75) Beckley, West Virginia, U.S.
- Political party: Democratic (before 2018); Independent (2018–present)
- Education: Davis and Elkins College (BA); West Virginia University, Morgantown (JD)

John A. Hutchison (born 1950) is an American lawyer who served as a justice of the Supreme Court of Appeals of West Virginia from 2018 to 2024. He served as chief justice in 2022. He temporarily served as a Senior Status justice on the court in 2025.

== Education ==
Hutchison received his Bachelor of Arts in history and political science from Davis & Elkins College in 1972. He graduated with his Juris Doctor from the West Virginia University College of Law in 1980.

== Career ==
Hutchison practiced law in Raleigh County for 10 years with Gorman, Sheatsley and Hutchison. In 1991, he opened the Nationwide Insurance West Virginia Trial Division Office and served as its managing trial attorney for four years.

=== Judicial service ===
Hutchison was appointed to the bench in the Tenth Judicial Circuit (Raleigh County) by then-Governor Gaston Caperton in 1995, and he was elected to that seat in 1996 and re-elected in 2000, 2008 and 2016.

=== Supreme Court of Appeals of West Virginia ===
After the resignation of Justice Allen Loughry, Hutchison was one of fifteen people interviewed by the West Virginia Judicial Vacancy Advisory Commission for the vacancy. He was appointed by Governor Jim Justice on December 12, 2018. Justice appointed Hutchison despite their different party registration. Hutchison had previously been elected as a Democrat through several partisan judicial elections. Nevertheless, the Republican Justice called Hutchison "one of the most conservative, respected jurists in the state of West Virginia" upon his appointment. Then-Republican Party Chair Melody Potter celebrated the appointment while Belinda Biafore, chairwoman of the state Democratic Party, accused Justice of playing politics with the appointment.

In June 2020, Hutchison faced his first election to serve the remainder of former Justice Allen Loughry's term. Hutchison beat Lora Dyer, a circuit court judge on the Fifth West Virginia Circuit Court and attorney William Schwartz. Hutchison became chief justice in 2022.

In late 2025, he temporarily returned to the Supreme Court of Appeals as a senior status judge following the death of Justice Tim Armstead.

General election results
Party	Candidate	Votes	%
Nonpartisan	John A. Hutchison (incumbent)	137,681	39.2%
Nonpartisan	Lora Dyer	124,939	31.0%
Nonpartisan	William Schwartz	88,369	25.6%
Total votes		350,989	100.0%

== Personal ==
He is married to Victoria Lagowski Hutchison and they have two children and two grandchildren.

Legal offices
Preceded by Paul Farrell; Acting	Justice of the West Virginia Supreme Court of Appeals; 2018–2024	Succeeded by Charles S. Trump
Preceded by Evan Jenkins	Chief Justice of the West Virginia Supreme Court of Appeals; 2022	Succeeded by Beth Walker
