= C. Haley Bunn =

American judge (born 1985 or 1986)

Haley Bunn

Chief Justice of the West Virginia Supreme Court of Appeals
- Incumbent
- Assumed office January 1, 2026
- Preceded by: William R. Wooton

Justice of the West Virginia Supreme Court of Appeals
- Incumbent
- Assumed office April 27, 2022
- Appointed by: Jim Justice
- Preceded by: Evan Jenkins

Personal details
- Born: 1985 or 1986 (age 40–41) Oceana, West Virginia, U.S.
- Party: Republican
- Education: West Virginia University (BA, JD)

C. Haley Bunn (born 1985 or 1986) is an American attorney who was appointed, and subsequently elected, to serve as a justice of the Supreme Court of Appeals of West Virginia. She began her term as chief justice in 2026.

== Early life and education ==
A native of Oceana, West Virginia, Bunn was born into a coal mining family. She earned a bachelor's degree from West Virginia University, where she was an honors graduate in 2007. In 2010, Bunn graduated with a Juris Doctor from the West Virginia University College of Law, Order of the Coif and Order of Barristers.

== Career ==
Bunn began her career as an attorney for Steptoe & Johnson. She later served as an assistant US attorney for the Southern District of West Virginia. A specialist in prosecuting opioid-related cases, Bunn was selected to serve on the U.S. Department of Justice's Opioid Fraud and Abuse Detection Unit in 2017.

On April 6, 2022, Bunn was appointed by Governor Jim Justice to succeed Evan Jenkins as a justice of the Supreme Court of Appeals of West Virginia. and took office on April 27, 2022. She was sworn into office on May 12, 2022, making her the youngest woman to serve on the court. Bunn began her term as chief justice on January 1, 2026.

She is also a member of the Defense Trial Counsel of West Virginia.

== Personal life ==
Bunn lives with her husband and two children in Charleston, West Virginia. They attend Bible Center Church. She has volunteered with the Boy Scouts of America.

Legal offices
Preceded by Evan Jenkins	Justice of the West Virginia Supreme Court of Appeals; 2022–present	Incumbent
Preceded by William R. Wooton	Chief Justice of the West Virginia Supreme Court of Appeals; 2026–present	Incumbent
