= L. Judson Williams =

American judge (1856–1921)

Luther Judson Williams (October 18, 1856 – October 21, 1921) was a justice of the Supreme Court of Appeals of West Virginia from January 1, 1909, to December 31, 1920.

Williams worked on farms and as a school teacher from 1876 to 1887, spending some time (1879–80) taking classes at West Virginia University. In 1887 he moved his family to Charlottesville, Virginia, attended the University of Virginia School of Law, and obtained a Virginia law licence. In 1888 he moved back to Greenbrier County, West Virginia and opened a practice in Lewisburg.

He was elected president of the West Virginia Bar Association in 1899. In 1901 he was appointed to a state tax commission and assisted in a revision of state tax law. In 1903 he was appointed to the board of regents of West Virginia University, a post he held until he was elected to the West Virginia Supreme Court in 1908.

Williams was a Republican, a Methodist, and a thirty-second degree Mason.

== Family ==
The Williams family were among the first European settlers in Greenbrier County; his grandfather John Williams was a large landowner, controlling as much as 200,000 acres. His uncle George Washington Williams served two terms in the West Virginia legislature and his brother, Howard E. Williams, served as Commissioner of Agriculture. L. Judson Williams himself was the second son of Albert and Nancy (Donnally) Williams, born near Williamsburg, West Virginia. He married three times: to Minnie J. Patterson (died 1892) in 1883; to Mary (Dice) Leonard (d. 1906) in 1894; and then to Harriet Peck. Williams and his first wife had two sons, Russell and Forest, and a daughter, Florence. Forest, born 1892, was a member of the 6th Marine Regiment and died of wounds received on July 19, 1918, during a bloody attack on German lines. Russell became a businessman in Kansas City, Missouri.
