= Menis Ketchum =

American judge

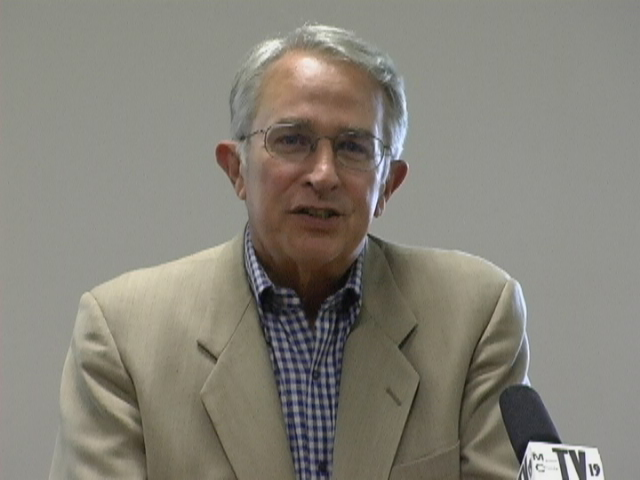

Justice of the Supreme Court of Appeals of West Virginia
- In office January 1, 2009 – July 27, 2018
- Preceded by: Spike Maynard
- Succeeded by: Tim Armstead

Personal details
- Born: January 31, 1943 (age 83) Wayne County, West Virginia, U.S.
- Party: Democratic
- Spouse: Judy Varnum
- Education: Ohio University (BA); West Virginia University College of Law (JD)

Menis E. Ketchum II (born January 31, 1943) is an American politician and jurist who served as a justice of the Supreme Court of Appeals of West Virginia. He was elected as a Democrat to a twelve-year term on the Court in November 2008 and served as chief justice in 2012 and served a second term as chief justice in 2016. He resigned in July 2018 with slightly less than 18 months left in his term. Ketchum resigned prior to the Impeachment of the Supreme Court of Appeals of West Virginia, but was still implicated by the House of Delegates. On July 31, 2018, he pled guilty to a felony count of fraud related to his personal use of a state vehicle and gas fuel card.

== Background ==
Ketchum was born and raised in Wayne County, West Virginia, the son of attorney Chad Ketchum (1911–98). A graduate of a West Virginia public school, Ketchum attended Ohio University in Athens, Ohio from 1960 to 1964. Upon returning to West Virginia, he enrolled at the West Virginia University College of Law in Morgantown. In 1967, he obtained his Juris Doctor.

== Prior legal career ==
Ketchum returned to Huntington, West Virginia to practice law with his father in the law firm of Greene, Ketchum & Baker in 1967. He practiced law with Greene, Ketchum, Bailey & Tweel and was a senior partner from 1980 until his election to the Supreme Court.

Ketchum was appointed to the Marshall University Board of Governors by then-Governor Bob Wise in 2002. He resigned on January 2, 2008, while serving as Vice-Chairman, to campaign for a seat on the Supreme Court of Appeals.

== Elections ==
In the November 2008 general election, Workman and Ketchum faced Republican nominee Beth Walker. Walker was the sole Republican nominee running for one of two spots on the Court, guaranteeing the election of either Ketchum or Workman and that the Court would likely remain majority-Democratic for at least four more years. Although Republicans won at the presidential level in West Virginia for the third straight presidential election, Democrats swept all of the other statewide offices on the ballot, including Governor, U.S. Senator, and every other executive office holder. However, the relatively nonpartisan nature of judicial races and the victory of Brent Benjamin to the Supreme Court in 2004 as a Republican, made the November general election competitive. Nevertheless, Huntington trial attorney Ketchum and former justice Workman beat out Beth Walker for seats on the Court. Walker would later win election in the Court's first nonpartisan election in 2016. Ketchum was sworn in on the Supreme Court of Appeals on December 18, 2008 and officially took his seat on January 1, 2009.

Supreme Court of Appeals, 2008 General Election results
Party	Candidate	Votes	%
Democratic	Menis Ketchum	355,778	34.83%
Democratic	Margaret Workman	336,346	32.93%
Republican	Beth Walker	329,395	32.25%
Total votes		1,021,519	100.0%

In the spring of 2008: Four Democrats filed for two seats on the State Supreme Court for the 2008 elections. In addition to Ketchum, they were former Supreme Court of Appeals Justice Margaret Workman, the first woman to serve on the state's high court, WVU Law professor and ballot access advocate Bob Bastress, and incumbent Justice Elliott "Spike" Maynard. Justice Larry Starcher declined to run for re-election, making one of the seats an "open seat race." Additionally, then-Chief Justice Spike Maynard was up for re-election in 2008 after having been elected to a twelve-year term in 1996. During his re-election campaign, Maynard drew criticism when photos became public of him vacationing on the French Riviera in 2006 with Massey Energy CEO Don Blankenship before voting with the majority in a 3-2 decision reversing a $76 million judgment against Massey Energy. At the time, Maynard said their friendship “has never influenced any decision I’ve made for the Court. Like most judges, I don't reward my friends, or punish my enemies from the bench.” Despite outraising his competitors, the fallout from the incident aided former justice Workman and Huntington attorney Menis Ketchum to win the Democratic nominations for two seats in the November general election.

Supreme Court of Appeals, 2008 Democratic Primary Election results
Party	Candidate	Votes	%
Democratic	Margaret Workman	180,599	35.97%
Democratic	Menis Ketchum	135,563	27.00%
Democratic	Spike Maynard (incumbent)	97,409	19.40%
Democratic	Robert Bastress	88,490	17.63%
Total votes		502,061	100.0%

== Time on the Court ==
In 2016, Ketchum was named the new vice president of the Conference of Chief Justices, an association of the top jurists of the states and territories. In 2017, he published "Pattern Jury Instructions," which took him five years to compile. The purpose of the instructions is so that "trial lawyers and judges to have at their disposal legally correct instructions that are understandable to a lay jury."

== Resignation and criminal conviction ==
In 2018 WCHS-TV and other media began an inquiry into the court's spending. It was found that Ketchum used a state owned Buick for regular commuting purposes without reporting this as a fringe benefit on his income tax, used the Buick for several personal trips to Virginia and was paid slightly less than $1,700 in improper travel reimbursements. He then repaid the $1,700 and restated his taxes for the years in question.

On July 11, 2018, he announced his intent to resign from the court effective July 27, 2018. On July 31, 2018, he entered a guilty plea in the United States District Court for the Southern District of West Virginia in Charleston to a felony count of wire fraud. He was sentenced to three years probation and fined $20,000.

On October 4, 2018, the Supreme Court of Appeals, due to Ketchum's criminal conviction, accepted the disciplinary recommendation of the state's Lawyer Disciplinary Board and officially annulled Ketchum's license to practice law in the state of West Virginia.

Legal offices
Preceded by Elliot E. "Spike" Maynard	Justice for the Supreme Court of Appeals of West Virginia; 2009–2018	Succeeded by Tim Armstead
Preceded by Margaret Workman	Chief Justice of the West Virginia Supreme Court of Appeals; 2016	Succeeded by Allen Loughry
