= Margaret Workman =

American judge

Chief Justice of the West Virginia Supreme Court of Appeals
- In office February 16, 2018 – December 31, 2018
- Preceded by: Allen Loughry
- Succeeded by: Beth Walker
- In office January 1, 2015 – December 31, 2015
- Preceded by: Robin Davis
- Succeeded by: Menis Ketchum
- In office January 1, 2011 – December 31, 2011
- Preceded by: Robin Davis
- Succeeded by: Menis Ketchum
- In office January 1, 1997 – December 31, 1997
- Preceded by: Thomas McHugh
- Succeeded by: Robin Davis
- In office January 1, 1993 – December 31, 1993
- Preceded by: Thomas McHugh
- Succeeded by: William T. Brotherton Jr.

Justice of the West Virginia Supreme Court of Appeals
- In office January 1, 2009 – December 31, 2020
- Preceded by: Larry Starcher
- Succeeded by: William R. Wooton
- In office January 1, 1989 – August 31, 1999
- Preceded by: Darrell McGraw
- Succeeded by: George Scott

Personal details
- Born: May 22, 1947 (age 78) Charleston, West Virginia, U.S.
- Party: Democratic
- Education: University of Charleston; West Virginia University, Morgantown (BA, JD)

Margaret Lee Workman (born May 22, 1947) is an American lawyer and a former justice of the Supreme Court of Appeals of West Virginia. Her 1988 election to the Supreme Court made her the first woman elected to statewide office in West Virginia and first female Justice on the Court.

== Life ==
Workman was born in Charleston, West Virginia to Mary Emma Thomas Workman and Frank Eugene Workman. Her father was a coal miner, and his ancestors were some of the first settlers of Boone County, West Virginia. She attended public schools in Kanawha County, West Virginia. She attended Morris Harvey College (now the University of Charleston) for one year and received her undergraduate degree from West Virginia University. She received a degree in law from West Virginia University College of Law. She was the first person in her family to attend college. She had three children.

== Career ==
As a senior in high school, Workman wrote a letter to West Virginia Governor Hulett Smith seeking employment, and she was hired to handle correspondence at the governor's office. This job led her to enroll in law school. After graduating from West Virginia University College of Law, she worked in Washington, D.C., for U.S. Senator Jennings Randolph, where she drafted legislation and did legal research. In 1974, she served as assistant majority counsel to the United States Senate Public Works Committee. She later returned to West Virginia to work with Professor (later Justice) Franklin D. Cleckley in his private practice of law. She became a law clerk for the 13th Judicial Circuit (Kanawha County) in West Virginia. In 1976, she served as an advance woman for Rosalynn Carter in the Jimmy Carter Presidential Campaign. Workman then opened her own law practice in Charleston, West Virginia. In 1981, she was appointed a circuit judge by Governor Jay Rockefeller in Kanawha County, West Virginia, to fill a vacancy. She was subsequently elected in 1982. She inherited the largest backlog of cases in West Virginia, and during her tenure, reduced said backlog to the lowest in the circuit. She also held more jury trials than any other circuit judge during her tenure. She was elected to the Supreme Court in 1988 for a 12-year term, expiring in 2000, making her the first woman elected to this position and the first woman elected to statewide office in West Virginia. She, however, resigned in 1999 with 18 months left on her term. She returned to her private law practice.

She then entered the Democratic primary in 2002 and 2004 for West Virginia's 2nd congressional district seat, but lost both times. She then ran again for the court in 2008 and was elected. Workman previously served as chief justice in 1993, 1997, 2011, and 2015.

== Impeachment ==
Following a series of controversies involving excessive spending, the West Virginia House Judiciary Committee voted to recommend that Workman and the three remaining justices be impeached on August 7, 2018 "for maladministration, corruption, incompetency, neglect of duty, and certain high crimes and misdemeanors". Based on the committee recommendation, Workman was impeached by the full West Virginia House of Delegates on August 13, 2018.

Justice Workman's impeachment trial was scheduled to begin on October 15, 2018. However, on October 11, the Supreme Court of Appeals, temporarily reconstituted with five circuit court judges, issued an injunction blocking the impeachment trial, stating that the articles of impeachment presented by the House of Delegates against Workman violated the separation of powers doctrine and, therefore, the Senate has no jurisdiction to try Workman on the impeachment. In addition, Judge Paul Farrell, who is presiding over the trial as acting Chief Justice, stated that he would not preside over Justice Workman's trial while the injunction was in place. The Senate met on October 15 and adjourned with no final decision on how to proceed being made. Senate President Mitch Carmichael did announce after the session had adjourned that the Senate would ask the Supreme Court of Appeals to reconsider their decision. Workman retired when her term expired on December 31, 2020.

== Awards and honors ==
In 1993, Workman received the West Virginia Prosecuting Attorneys Association's Excellence in Criminal Justice Award. She has also received the Susan B. Anthony Award, the Celebrate Women Award for Government and Public Service Award, and the WVU College of Law Women's Law Caucus Distinguished Women in the Law Award.

== Elections ==
Fall 2008: In the November General Election, Workman and Ketchum faced Republican nominee Beth Walker. Walker was the sole Republican nominee running for one of two spots on the Court, guaranteeing the election of either Ketchum or Workman and that the Court would likely remain majority-Democratic for at least four more years. Although Republicans won at the presidential level in West Virginia for the third straight presidential election, Democrats swept all of the other statewide offices on the ballot, including Governor, U.S. Senator, and every other executive office holder. However, the relatively nonpartisan nature of judicial races and the victory of Brent Benjamin to the Supreme Court in 2004 as a Republican, made the November general election competitive. Nevertheless, Huntington trial attorney Ketchum and former Justice Workman beat out Beth Walker for seats on the Court. Walker would later win election in the Court's first nonpartisan election in 2016.

Supreme Court of Appeals, 2008 General Election results
Party	Candidate	Votes	%
Democratic	Menis Ketchum	355,778	34.83%
Democratic	Margaret Workman	336,346	32.93%
Republican	Beth Walker	329,395	32.25%
Total votes		1,021,519	100.0%

Spring 2008: Justice Larry Starcher declined to run for re-election, opening a seat on the Court. Additionally, then-Chief Justice Spike Maynard was up for re-election in 2008 after having been elected to a twelve-year term in 1996. During his re-election campaign, Maynard drew criticism when photos became public of him vacationing on the French Riviera in 2006 with Massey Energy CEO Don Blankenship before voting with the majority in a 3-2 decision reversing a $76 million judgment against Massey Energy. At the time, Maynard said their friendship “has never influenced any decision I’ve made for the Court. Like most judges I don't reward my friends, or punish my enemies from the bench.” Despite outraising his competitors, fallout from the incident aided former Justice Workman and Huntington attorney Menis Ketchum to win the Democratic nominations for two seats in the November general election.

Supreme Court of Appeals, 2008 Democratic Primary Election results
Party	Candidate	Votes	%
Democratic	Margaret Workman	180,599	35.97%
Democratic	Menis Ketchum	135,563	27.00%
Democratic	Spike Maynard (incumbent)	97,409	19.40%
Democratic	Robert Bastress	88,490	17.63%
Total votes		502,061	100.0%

2004: Workman challenged incumbent Republican Senate Minority Leader, Vic Sprouse. Workman was unopposed in the primary and became the Democratic nominee. Workman lost to Sprouse 56.4%-43.6%.

West Virginia's 8th Senate district, 2004 General Election results
Party	Candidate	Votes	%
Republican	Vic Sprouse (incumbent)	48,762	56.39%
Democratic	Margaret Workman	37,709	43.61%
Total votes		86,471	100.0%

2002: Workman ran for the Democratic nomination to West Virginia's 2nd congressional district, a seat won by Republican Shelley Moore Capito in 2000. Prior to Capito's election in 2000, the District had remained in Democratic control for 64 of the prior 68 years. Workman faced former state senator and 2000 Democratic nominee for the seat, Jim Humphreys, in the May nominating contest. Humphreys beat Workman by a razor thin 51-49% margin to face a re-match against Capito. Capito went on to beat Humphreys 60-40% in the November general election, improving on her 48.5%-46% victory in 2000. Capito would go onto successfully hold the seat until her election to the U.S. Senate in 2014.

West Virginia's 2nd congressional district, 2002 Democratic Primary Election results
Party	Candidate	Votes	%
Democratic	Jim Humphreys	31,597	51.39%
Democratic	Margaret Workman	29,888	48.61%
Total votes		61,485	100.0%

Fall 1988: Workman and Miller faced Republican nominees former House Delegate and West Virginia Public Service Commissioner Charlotte Lane and attorney Jeniver Jones in the November general election. Despite Republicans winning their third straight U.S. presidential election at the federal level, Lane and Jones faced an uphill battle to beat Workman and Miller in the then-solidly Democratic state. Since 1930, no Republican had been elected as a Supreme Court Justice. Workman and Miller easily went onto beat Lane and Jones in the general election. Workman's election made her the first female Justice on the Supreme Court and first woman elected to statewide office in West Virginia.

Supreme Court of Appeals, 1988 General Election results
Party	Candidate	Votes	%
Democratic	Margaret Workman	363,458	33.96%
Democratic	Thomas B. Miller (incumbent)	346,391	32.37%
Republican	Charlotte Lane	210,473	19.67%
Republican	Jeniver James Jones	149,920	14.00%
Total votes		1,070,242	100.0%

Spring 1988: Then-circuit court judge Margaret Workman decided to run for one of two seats up on the Supreme Court. Workman joined fellow attorneys Fred Fox and John Hey as challengers to incumbent Justices Darrell McGraw and Thomas Miller. Fox, Hey, and Workman ran against McGraw and Miller and labeled them as "judicial activists" during their time on the bench, accusing them of aiding special interest groups, such as labor unions, personal injury claimants, workers' compensation claimants, and criminal defendants. The attacks were not entirely successful, as Miller led the five-way Democratic primary to advance to the November general election. However, Workman did edge out incumbent McGraw to become the Democratic nominee for the second seat. McGraw later returned to elected office as West Virginia Attorney General in 1996, a position he held until his defeat in 2012.

Supreme Court of Appeals, 1988 Democratic Primary Election results
Party	Candidate	Votes	%
Democratic	Thomas B. Miller (incumbent)	136,582	24.67%
Democratic	Margaret Workman	119,890	21.66%
Democratic	Darrell McGraw (incumbent)	113,028	20.42%
Democratic	John Hey	92,679	16.74%
Democratic	Fred L. Fox II	91,367	16.51%
Total votes		553,546	100.0%

== See also ==
- List of female state supreme court justices

Legal offices
Preceded by Darrell McGraw	Justice of the West Virginia Supreme Court of Appeals; 1988–1999	Succeeded by George M. Scott
Preceded by Thomas McHugh	Chief Justice of the West Virginia Supreme Court of Appeals; 1993	Succeeded by William T. Brotherton Jr.
Preceded by Thomas McHugh	Chief Justice of the West Virginia Supreme Court of Appeals; 1997	Succeeded by Robin Davis
Preceded by Larry Starcher	Justice of the West Virginia Supreme Court of Appeals; 2020	Succeeded by William R. Wooton
Preceded by Robin Davis	Chief Justice of the West Virginia Supreme Court of Appeals; 2011	Succeeded by Menis Ketchum
Preceded by Robin Davis	Chief Justice of the West Virginia Supreme Court of Appeals; 2015	Succeeded by Menis Ketchum
Preceded by Allen Loughry	Chief Justice of the West Virginia Supreme Court of Appeals; 2018	Succeeded by Beth Walker
