= Thomas McHugh (judge) =

American judge (1936–2025)

Thomas Edward McHugh (March 26, 1936 – January 14, 2025) was an American jurist who served on the Supreme Court of Appeals of West Virginia. In 1980 and 1992, McHugh was elected as a Democrat to full, twelve-year terms on the Court. He however retired on December 31, 1997, with 7 years remaining on his term, and resumed the practice of law in Charleston.

On September 10, 2008, then-Chief Justice Eliot E. "Spike" Maynard named McHugh to temporarily replace Justice Joseph P. Albright. Justice Albright had taken medical leave after being diagnosed with esophageal cancer. Justice Albright died on March 20, 2009. On April 8, 2009, then Governor Joe Manchin appointed Justice McHugh to Justice Albright's vacant seat. Under Article 8, Section 2 of the West Virginia Constitution, McHugh's appointment was limited until the next, regular election (2010), which McHugh won. He pledged to not run for the full term in 2012 and left the court in January 2013.

McHugh died on January 14, 2025, at the age of 88.

Legal offices
Preceded by Fred H. Caplan	Justice for the Supreme Court of Appeals of West Virginia; 1981–1997	Succeeded by John F. McCuskey
Preceded by Joseph P. Albright	Justice for the Supreme Court of Appeals of West Virginia; 2009–2013	Succeeded by Allen Loughry
