= Allen Loughry =

American jurist (born 1970)

Chief Justice of the West Virginia Supreme Court of Appeals
- In office January 1, 2017 – February 16, 2018
- Preceded by: Menis Ketchum
- Succeeded by: Margaret Workman

Justice of the West Virginia Supreme Court of Appeals
- In office January 1, 2013 – November 12, 2018; Suspended: June 8, 2018 – November 12, 2018
- Preceded by: Thomas McHugh
- Succeeded by: Paul Farrell (Acting, by designation)

Personal details
- Born: Allen Hayes Loughry, II; August 9, 1970 (age 55) Elkins, West Virginia, U.S.
- Party: Republican
- Education: West Virginia University, Morgantown (BS); Capital University (JD); American University (LLM, SJD); University of London (LLM)

Allen Hayes Loughry II (born August 9, 1970) is a former justice on the Supreme Court of Appeals of West Virginia.

Loughry was arrested by the FBI in 2018 after being indicted by a grand jury. In October 2018, he was convicted on 11 federal offenses, specifically wire fraud, making false statements to federal investigators, witness tampering and mail fraud. The following month, after facing impeachment, Loughry resigned from office.

== Early life and education ==
Loughry was born in 1970 and grew up in Parsons in Tucker County, West Virginia. He graduated from Tucker County High School in 1988 and went on to earn an undergraduate degree from the Perley Isaac Reed School of Journalism at West Virginia University (1992).

Loughry earned a J.D. degree from Capital University Law School in Columbus, Ohio; an LL.M. in Law and Government and an S.J.D. (Doctor of Juridical Science) from American University's Washington College of Law, and an LL.M. in Criminology and Criminal Justice from the University of London.

== Career ==
Loughry was an assistant to U.S. Representative Harley O. Staggers, Jr. and Governor Gaston Caperton before joining the West Virginia Attorney General's Office as a senior assistant attorney general in 1997. In 2003, he left the attorney general's office to become a law clerk at the West Virginia Supreme Court of Appeals. He also taught political science classes at the University of Charleston.

In 2006, Loughry published Don't Buy Another Vote, I Won't Pay for a Landslide: The Sordid and Continuing History of Political Corruption in West Virginia, a review of the history of political corruption in the state. The forewords to the book were written by Senators Robert Byrd and John McCain.

== Election to state Supreme Court and election as chief justice ==
In 2012, Loughry ran as a Republican for a seat on the West Virginia Supreme Court and won a 12-year term. He assumed office on January 1, 2013, succeeding Thomas McHugh, who retired from the bench.

In April 2017, Loughry was selected to serve as Chief Justice of the West Virginia Supreme Court for a four-year term. It was the first time a chief justice would serve four consecutive years since 1888. Previously, the chief justice had been elected by the Supreme Court to serve a one-year term, with a few justices serving two years in a row, but the court "voted to change its rules to provide for the chief justice to serve a four-year term and to allow the chief justice to be re-elected to subsequent four-year terms by a majority vote of the members of the court."

== Scandal ==
=== Federal prosecution and conviction ===
In late 2017, reports came to light of high spending by Loughry and Justice Robin Davis totaling well more than a million dollars, and at an emergency meeting, he was replaced as Chief Justice by Justice Margaret Workman.

On June 20, 2018, he was arrested at his home by the FBI, and later in the day. Michael B. Stuart, United States Attorney for the Southern District of West Virginia, announced that a grand jury had indicted Loughry on 22 counts, including 16 counts of frauds and swindles, two counts of wire fraud, one count of witness tampering, and three counts of lying to federal investigators.

Loughry’s federal criminal trial began on October 2. The trial concluded ten days later with Loughry being convicted of seven counts of wire fraud, one count of mail fraud, one count of witness tampering and two counts of lying to the FBI. The jury found Loughry not guilty on nine counts of wire fraud and two counts of mail fraud. They also deadlocked on one count of wire fraud after United States District Judge John Thomas Copenhaver Jr. refused to issue an Allen charge to the jury concerning this count. Loughry was sentenced to 24 months in federal prison on February 13, 2019 and was sent to serve his sentence at FCI Williamsburg. He was released from prison on December 19, 2020.

=== Suspension from office, impeachment proceedings, and resignation ===
On June 6, 2018, the state Judicial Ethics Committee charged Loughry with 32 counts of violation of the code of judicial ethics. The Supreme Court, reconstituted with four circuit judges and a retired circuit judge, appointed for that purpose, suspended him without pay until further notice.

On June 26, 2018, Governor Jim Justice called the West Virginia Legislature into special session to consider Loughry's impeachment.

Following a series of controversies involving excessive spending, the House of Delegates, on the recommendation of the House Judiciary Committee, voted to impeach Loughry and justices Davis, Workman and Beth Walker on August 13, 2018 "for maladministration, corruption, incompetency, neglect of duty, and certain high crimes and misdemeanors". The fifth Supreme Court Judge, Menis Ketchum, had already pled guilty to wire fraud and resigned. On November 9, 2018, Governor Jim Justice called the West Virginia Legislature into another special session to correct the procedural errors of the prior impeachment proceedings.

On November 12, 2018—one day before the state legislature was to convene in special session to consider whether Loughry should be impeached and removed from office—Loughry resigned.

== Awards and honors ==
In 2013, the American University Washington College of Law awarded Loughry its Distinguished Alumnus Award. In 2014, the Tucker County Chamber of Commerce awarded Loughry its Tuckineer Award, given to individuals for their civic commitment and service to Tucker County.

== Works ==
- Loughry, Allen. Don't Buy Another Vote, I Won't Pay for a Landslide: The Sordid and Continuing History of Political Corruption in West Virginia. Parsons, WV: McClain Printing Company, 2006.

Legal offices
| Preceded by Thomas McHugh | Justice of the West Virginia Supreme Court of Appeals; 2013–2018 | Succeeded by Paul Farrell; Acting |
| Preceded by Menis Ketchum | Chief Justice of the West Virginia Supreme Court of Appeals; 2017–2018 | Succeeded by Margaret Workman |
