= Tim Armstead =

American judge (1965–2025)

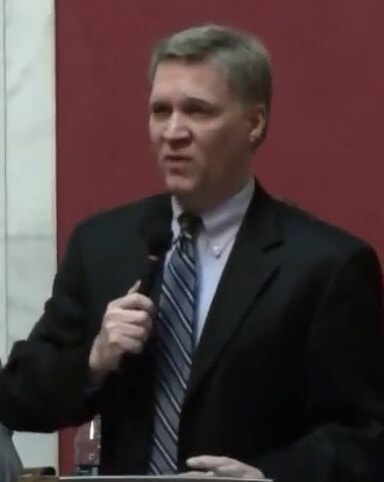
- Armstead in 2012

Chief Justice of the West Virginia Supreme Court of Appeals
- In office January 1, 2024 – December 31, 2024
- Preceded by: Beth Walker
- Succeeded by: William R. Wooton
- In office January 1, 2020 – December 31, 2020
- Preceded by: Beth Walker
- Succeeded by: Evan Jenkins

Justice of the West Virginia Supreme Court of Appeals
- In office September 25, 2018 – August 26, 2025
- Appointed by: Jim Justice
- Preceded by: Menis Ketchum
- Succeeded by: Gerald Titus

Speaker of the West Virginia House of Delegates
- In office January 14, 2015 – August 21, 2018
- Preceded by: Tim Miley
- Succeeded by: Roger Hanshaw

Minority Leader of the West Virginia House of Delegates
- In office January 10, 2007 – January 7, 2015
- Preceded by: Charles S. Trump
- Succeeded by: Tim Miley

Member of the West Virginia House of Delegates from the 40th district
- In office September 1998 – August 21, 2018
- Succeeded by: Dean Jeffries

Personal details
- Born: Timothy Paul Armstead; February 26, 1965 Charleston, West Virginia, U.S.
- Died: August 26, 2025 (aged 60) Morgantown, West Virginia, U.S.
- Party: Republican
- Education: University of Charleston (BA); West Virginia University (JD)

Timothy Paul Armstead (February 26, 1965 – August 26, 2025) was an American politician who served as a justice of the Supreme Court of Appeals of West Virginia from 2018 until his death. In 2024, he began his second term as the chief justice. He had earlier represented the 40th District (Kanawha County) in the West Virginia House of Delegates. In 2015, Armstead became the first Republican Speaker of the House of Delegates in 84 years, serving in the position until 2018. Armstead was originally from Clendenin, West Virginia.

== Education ==
Armstead received a Bachelor of Arts in Political Science and History from the University of Charleston and a Juris Doctor from West Virginia University College of Law.

== Supreme Court of Appeals of West Virginia ==
On August 25, 2018, Governor Jim Justice appointed Armstead to fill the vacancy by the retirement of Menis Ketchum. He was sworn in on September 25, 2018.

He was subsequently elected to the seat on November 5, 2018, to complete the term ending on January 1, 2021. He had stated that he would be a candidate for a full term of 12 years in the election which was held in May 2020. He served as chief justice in 2020, and became the chief justice again on January 1, 2024.

== Death ==
Armstead died at J.W. Ruby Memorial Hospital in Morgantown, West Virginia, on August 26, 2025, at the age of 60. He had cancer at the time of his death.

West Virginia House of Delegates
| Preceded by Charles S. Trump | Minority Leader of the West Virginia House of Delegates; 2007–2015 | Succeeded by Tim Miley |
Political offices
| Preceded by Tim Miley | Speaker of the West Virginia House of Delegates; 2015–2018 | Succeeded by Roger Hanshaw |
Legal offices
| Preceded by Menis Ketchum | Justice for the Supreme Court of Appeals of West Virginia; 2018–2025 | Succeeded by Gerald Titus |
| Preceded by Beth Walker | Chief Justice of the West Virginia Supreme Court of Appeals; 2020 | Succeeded by Evan Jenkins |
| Preceded by Beth Walker | Chief Justice of the West Virginia Supreme Court of Appeals; 2024 | Succeeded by William R. Wooton |
