= West Virginia Circuit Courts =

State trial courts in West Virginia

The West Virginia Circuit Courts are the West Virginia state trial courts of general jurisdiction. They are the only state trial courts in West Virginia that are courts of record. West Virginia's 55 counties are divided into 31 circuits, each comprising anywhere from one to four counties. Different circuits have different numbers of judges; 11 circuits have only a single judge. Effective with the 2024 election, the circuits will be realigned into 30 circuits, with only one having a single judge.

Circuit judges were formerly elected in partisan elections to serve eight-year terms. In 2015, the Legislature changed the law to provide that future elections will be on a non-partisan basis. Judges must have engaged in the practice of law for at least five years. When a vacancy occurs, the governor of West Virginia appoints a judge, who must run in the next election to retain his or her seat. Because of the nature of the state's judicial retirement system, resignations near the end of a judge's term are common if the judge is a member of the same political party as the sitting governor.

The circuit courts have original jurisdiction over:

- All civil cases with an amount in controversy in excess of $300
- All civil cases in equity
- Writs of habeas corpus, mandamus, quo warranto, prohibition, and certiorari
- All felonies and misdemeanors

The circuit courts have original appellate jurisdiction involving:

- Appeals from magistrate court and municipal court (lower state courts of limited jurisdiction)

Until June 30, 2022, the circuit courts had appellate jurisdiction over:

- Appeals from the decisions of administrative agencies (excluding workers' compensation appeals)
- Appeals of family court decisions, unless both parties agree to appeal directly to the Supreme Court of Appeals of West Virginia

Today, such appeals shall go to the Intermediate Court of Appeals of West Virginia

Appeals from the criminal decisions of circuit courts go the state supreme court, the Supreme Court of Appeals of West Virginia. Civil appeals go first to the Intermediate Court.

== History ==
Circuit Courts for each county are required by the state constitution, and have existed since the creation of the state. Prior to 1976, the state legislature often established supplemental limited jurisdiction courts of varying jurisdiction in some counties, including Courts of Common Pleas, Criminal Courts, Intermediate Courts, and Divorce Courts. In 1976, all of these courts were abolished. The payment and supervision of judges was also transferred from county to state responsibility in that year.

Divorce jurisdiction was handled in a variety of informal ways until 1986 when a "Family Law Master" system was established, making "recommended decisions" to the judge. This system proved unsatisfactory and was replaced with the West Virginia Family Courts in 2000, and Circuit Court were assigned appellate jurisdiction in such matters.

Prior to the 2000 elections, judges were elected in a form of "jungle" election with a single election for all seats. For example, in Kanawha County, voters were asked to vote for "not more than seven" and the top seven won election. This was replaced with numbered divisions in multi-judge circuits, with a separate vote for one election in each division, so judges do not have to run against one another for re-election.

West Virginia's Judiciary includes a Business Court Division. The Business Court Division (BCD) was created by the Supreme Court of Appeals adoption of Trial Court Rule 29 in September 2012, and the BCD formally opened in October 2012, with Judge Christopher C. Wilkes as the first BCD chair.

Beginning with the 2016 elections, judges were elected on a non-partisan basis and the election was moved from a primary in May and a general election in November to a single election in May, giving newly elected judges more time to wind up their practices. The judges elected in the non-partisan election held May 10, 2016 and took office January 1, 2017.

Map of the judicial circuits as of 2025

== List of circuits effective January 1, 2025 ==
- First – Hancock, Brooke and Ohio counties (four judges)
- Second – Marshall, Wetzel and Tyler counties (two judges)
- Third – Ritchie, Doddridge, Wirt and Pleasants counties (two judges, provided that no more than one may be a resident of the same county)
- Four – Wood (three judges)
- Fifth – Calhoun, Jackson, Mason and Roane counties (three judges, provided that one judge shall be a resident of Jackson, one of Mason, and one of either Calhoun or Roane)
- Sixth – Cabell County (four judges)
- Seventh – Putnam County (two judges)
- Eighth – Kanawha County (eight judges)
- Ninth – Boone and Lincoln counties (two judges)
- Tenth – Wayne County (two judges)
- Eleventh – Logan County and Mingo County (three judges, provided that two shall be residents of Logan and one of Mingo)
- Twelfth – Wyoming County and McDowell County (two judges, provided that one shall be a resident of each county)
- Thirteenth – Mercer County (three judges)
- Fourteenth – Raleigh County (four judges)
- Fifteenth –Fayette County (two judges)
- Sixteenth – Nicholas County (two judges)
- Seventeenth – Braxton, Clay, Gilmer, and Webster counties (two judges, provided that no more than one may be a resident of the same county)
- Eighteenth – Lewis and Upshur counties (two judges, provided that one shall be a resident of each county)
- Nineteenth –Harrison County (three judges)
- Twentieth – Marion County (two judges)
- Twenty-First – Monongalia County (three judges)
- Twenty-Second – Preston County and Tucker counties (two judges)
- Twenty-Third –Barbour and Taylor counties (two judges)
- Twenty-Fourth – Randolph County (two judges)
- Twenty-Fifth –Grant and Mineral (two judges)
- Twenty-Sixth – Hampshire, Hardy and Pendleton counties (two judges)
- Twenty-Seventh –Berkeley, and Morgan counties (five judges)
- Twenty-Eighth – Jefferson (two judges)
- Twenty-Ninth – Greenbrier and Pocahontas counties (two judges)
- Thirtieth – Monroe and Summers counties (one judge)

The Circuit Court of Raleigh County is a court of concurrent jurisdiction over the Thirtieth Circuit, the only circuit with only one judge, when the judge is unavailable for any reason.
