= Beth Walker (judge) =

American judge (born 1965)

Chief Justice of the West Virginia Supreme Court of Appeals
- In office January 1, 2023 – December 31, 2023
- Preceded by: John A. Hutchison
- Succeeded by: Tim Armstead
- In office January 1, 2019 – December 31, 2019
- Preceded by: Margaret Workman
- Succeeded by: Tim Armstead

Justice of the West Virginia Supreme Court of Appeals
- In office January 1, 2017 – June 27, 2025
- Preceded by: Brent Benjamin
- Succeeded by: Tom Ewing

Personal details
- Born: March 24, 1965 (age 61) Oak Park, Illinois, U.S.
- Party: Republican
- Spouse: Mike Walker
- Education: Hillsdale College (BA); Ohio State University (JD)

Elizabeth D. "Beth" Walker (born March 24, 1965) is an American lawyer and jurist who served as a justice of the West Virginia Supreme Court of Appeals from 2017 to 2025. She was elected in the Court's first non-partisan election on May 10, 2016. She began a 12-year term on January 1, 2017. Walker is the 77th justice to serve on the West Virginia Supreme Court of Appeals. She was an unsuccessful candidate for the same office in 2008. She served as chief justice in 2019 and 2023.

Walker was named in articles of impeachment passed by the West Virginia House of Delegates on August 13, 2018, during the Impeachment of the Supreme Court of Appeals of West Virginia. Thereafter, Walker was "reprimanded and censured" on October 2, 2018, but allowed to remain in office after being the only Justice tried in the West Virginia Senate.

== Education ==
Walker graduated fromm Hillsdale College, summa cum laude in 1987, she earned a Juris Doctor in 1990 from the Ohio State University Moritz College of Law, where she was Articles Editor for The Ohio State Law Journal.

She was admitted to practice in the Supreme Court of the United States, United States Court of Appeals for the Fourth Circuit and United States Court of Appeals for the Sixth Circuit, District Courts in West Virginia and Ohio and the Supreme Court of Appeals of West Virginia.

== Career ==
Prior to taking the bench, Walker was an attorney for West Virginia University Medicine. Prior to that, Walker was a partner in the law firm of Bowles Rice, where she concentrated her statewide practice on labor and employment law for more than 20 years. She has advised large and small employers in a wide variety of industries including manufacturing, energy, health care, financial services, professional services and associations and retail sales. She also has experience representing higher education entities, municipalities, counties and boards of education in the public sector.

In 2012, Walker was elected a Fellow of the College of Labor and Employment Lawyers, which is an international membership association of more than one thousand lawyers who practice in labor employment law.

=== West Virginia Court of Appeals ===
==== Campaign ====
Walker stated that she was running for the Supreme Court of Appeals of West Virginia because West Virginians deserve a fair and impartial court system. She stated that she understands the importance of the role of the Supreme Court as an independent branch of government. She was generally considered the right-most of the four serious candidates in the 2016 nonpartisan election. Those she defeated to earn the spot included then-current Justice Brent Benjamin (the incumbent), former Justice and state Attorney General Darrell McGraw, and future Justice William Wooton.

==== Female majority ====
Once Walker took office, West Virginia briefly had a female majority on the state Supreme Court for the first time in history. At the time, West Virginia was one of 11 states whose top courts had a majority of women.

==== Chief justice ====
Walker served as chief justice in 2019 and 2023.

==== Impeachment ====
Following a series of controversies involving excessive spending, the West Virginia House Judiciary Committee voted on August 7, 2018 to recommend that Walker and the other three remaining justices be impeached "for maladministration, corruption, incompetency, neglect of duty, and certain high crimes and misdemeanors". On August 13, 2018 the full House of Delegates approved the Judiciary Committee recommendation and impeached Walker. On October 2, 2018, after a two-day impeachment trial, the West Virginia Senate, in a 32-1-1 vote, decided not to remove Walker from office. The Senate later voted to publicly "reprimand and censure" Walker for her actions in the spending scandal.

=== Retirement ===
In April 2025 it was announced that Walker would retire effective June 27, 2025.

== Affiliations ==
Walker is a 1999 graduate of Leadership West Virginia and past Chair of that organization's Board of Directors. She also is a past president of the board of Kanawha Pastoral Counseling Center. She is past Board Chair and current board member of Girl Scouts of Black Diamond Council.

== Personal ==
She is married to Mike Walker, an attorney and former executive vice president of Cecil I. Walker Machinery Co. They reside in Charleston, West Virginia.

== Elections ==
Supreme Court of Appeals, 2016 Election results
Party	Candidate	Votes	%
Nonpartisan	Beth Walker	162,245	39.62%
Nonpartisan	Darrell McGraw	94,538	23.08%
Nonpartisan	William R. Wooton	84,641	20.67%
Nonpartisan	Brent Benjamin (incumbent)	51,064	12.47%
Nonpartisan	Wayne King	17,054	4.16%
Total votes		409,542	100.0%

Supreme Court of Appeals, 2008 Election results
Party	Candidate	Votes	%
Democratic	Menis Ketchum	355,778	34.83%
Democratic	Margaret Workman	336,346	32.93%
Republican	Beth Walker	329,395	32.25%
Total votes		1,021,519	100.0%

Legal offices
Preceded by Brent Benjamin	Justice of the West Virginia Supreme Court of Appeals; 2017–2025	Succeeded by Tom Ewing
Preceded by Margaret Workman	Chief Justice of the West Virginia Supreme Court of Appeals; 2019	Succeeded by Tim Armstead
Preceded by John A. Hutchison	Chief Justice of the West Virginia Supreme Court of Appeals; 2023	Succeeded by Tim Armstead
