= Supreme Court of Appeals of West Virginia =

Highest court in the U.S. state of West Virginia

Coordinates: 38.336401°N 81.612062°W

- Seal of the Supreme Court of Appeals of West Virginia
- Interactive map of Supreme Court of Appeals of West Virginia
- Established: 1863; 1872
- Jurisdiction: West Virginia, United States
- Location: Charleston, West Virginia
- Composition method: Non-partisan election
- Authorized by: West Virginia Constitution
- Appeals to: Supreme Court of the United States (Federal cases only)
- Judge term length: 12 years
- Number of positions: 5
- Website: Supreme Court of Appeals of West Virginia

Chief Justice
- Currently: C. Haley Bunn
- Since: January 1, 2026
- Lead position ends: June 30, 2027
- Jurist term ends: 2036

The Supreme Court of Appeals of West Virginia is the state supreme court of the state of West Virginia, the highest of West Virginia's state courts. The court sits primarily at the West Virginia State Capitol in Charleston, although from 1873 to 1915, it was also required by state law to hold sessions in Charles Town in the state's Eastern Panhandle. The court also holds special sittings at various locations across the state.

Although the West Virginia Constitution allowed for an intermediate court of appeals to be created, the Legislature declined to do so from 1974 until 2021. Thus, the Supreme Court provided the only review of the decisions of the state's trial courts of general jurisdiction, the West Virginia Circuit Courts, during that period. In December 2010, the Supreme Court promulgated a major revision of West Virginia's rules of appellate procedure, by which it provided that it would hear all properly perfected appeals of right from the circuit courts. On July 1, 2022 a new intermediate appellate court, the Intermediate Court of Appeals of West Virginia, began operation, overseeing administrative, family, and civil appellate jurisdiction while criminal cases will continue to only be reviewed by the Supreme Court.

Justices are elected to 12-year terms in staggered, statewide, nonpartisan elections. In years that two seats are up for election, a separate election is held for each seat. Before 2015, the justices of the court were elected in partisan elections; no justices remain from the partisan era.

Pursuant to the West Virginia Code (chapter 51), the Court holds two regular sessions annually with the first session commencing on the second Tuesday in January and the second session commencing on the first Wednesday in September. The Court may also sit in special session as needed.

Upon the death, resignation, or removal of a sitting justice, Article 8, Section 2 of the West Virginia Constitution permits the Governor to appoint a replacement. An election to fulfill the unexpired term must be held by the next regular general election. Because of the long length of the court's term (12 years), mid-term vacancies are frequent.

== Background ==
Until 2015, elections to the Supreme Court of Appeals were partisan. After Republicans took control of the West Virginia Legislature, the elections were changed to be non-partisan. Despite their officially nonpartisan status, the political party memberships of all justices are known, as all have held or run for other partisan offices.

As a result of criminal investigations and impeachment of the entire court, there was significant turnover in the makeup of the West Virginia Supreme Court in 2018. First, on July 11, 2018, Menis Ketchum resigned from the court. Ketchum's resignation was part of a July 31, 2018, plea bargain, where he pled guilty to a single felony count of wire fraud. Although never implicated in any criminal conduct, on August 13, 2018, Robin Davis retired from the court after being impeached. Finally, on November 12, 2018, Allen Loughry resigned after being impeached, and separately, convicted of multiple federal felonies. None of the justices were removed by the Senate due to procedural issues.

Governor Jim Justice appointed Jenkins (a sitting congressman), and Armstead (the former House of Delegates Speaker) to Ketchum's and Davis's former seats on August 25, 2018. Both Jenkins and Armstead filed their candidacies for the November general election, and both were later elected.

On December 12, 2018, Justice appointed Hutchison, a lifelong friend and circuit judge in Raleigh County, to the seat vacated by Loughry. Justice made the appointment despite Hutchison being in a different political party from himself, describing Hutchison as "a conservative" and "a respected jurist".

The Chief Justiceship is a rotating office, which by tradition changed from one Justice to another each year. In December 2021, it was announced that John A. Hutchison would be chief justice in 2022 and Beth Walker would be chief justice in 2023.

The Court sometimes designates "senior-status" (retired) judges or justices to temporarily fill vacancies when required. Other times it will promote a current Circuit Court Judge. By tradition most Circuit Judges are promoted to at least one such case during their careers. For the Fall 2018 Term, the Court appointed Cabell County Circuit Court Judge Paul T. Farrell to sit in the place of Loughry. This was a temporary assignment and did not constitute Ferrell becoming a Justice. In light of Loughry's resignation and Hutchison's appointment, Ferrell returned to duty in Cabell County at the end of the fall 2018 court term.

Likewise, the Court appointed Judge Alan Moats, whose circuit is Barbour and Taylor counties, in February 2022 to serve in Jenkins spot until governor acted on the vacancy. This was a temporary assignment and does not constitute Moats becoming a justice.'

== Justices ==
Name	Born	Start	Chief term	Term ends (Note: Term ends Dec. 31 of the year listed.)	Party	Appointer	Law school
C. Haley Bunn, Chief Justice	1985 or 1986 (age 40–41)	April 27, 2022	2026–present	2036	Republican	Jim Justice (R)	West Virginia
William R. Wooton	September 20, 1944 (age 81)	January 1, 2021	2025	2032	Democratic	—N/a (Note: Took office after being elected in a nonpartisan election.)	West Virginia
Charles S. Trump	October 3, 1960 (age 65)	January 1, 2025	–	2036	Republican	—N/a	West Virginia
Bill Flanigan	June 20, 1974 (age 51)	June 11, 2026	–	2028	Republican	—N/a	West Virginia
Kirk Kirkpatrick	1951 (age 74–75)	June 12, 2026	–	2032	Republican	—N/a	West Virginia

== Elections ==
=== 2016 ===
The seat held by Brent Benjamin was contested. This was the first election held on a non-partisan basis, and the first decided during the May primary election rather than in November. Because the expiration of the 12-year Supreme Court term and the 8-year Circuit Court term coincided, no current circuit judge could run for the seat without forgoing an attempt at re-election to his or her current position. Benjamin announced on April 16, 2015, that he would seek a second term, this one on a non-partisan basis. On June 5, 2015, Beth Walker, announced she would be a candidate, stating that she would run to the political right of Benjamin. On December 12, 2015, trial lawyer and former Democratic legislator, William Wooton, announced he would be a candidate, supported by donations from trial lawyers and run to the left of those candidates. On the last day to file, former justice Darrell McGraw, who was voted out of office after one term in 1988 announced he would run to the left of all candidates.

In the election, Beth Walker received 39% of the vote to McGraw's 23%, Wooton's 21% and Benjamin's 12%. Walker took office on January 1, 2017.

=== 2018 ===
On July 11, 2018, due to the 2017-2018 expenses scandal (see below), Justice Ketchum resigned. This triggered the first special election held on November 6, 2018. The Governor filled the vacancy until the election by appointing Tim Armstead, the former state House Speaker. A total of 10 candidates filed for the seat. Tim Armstead, the appointee was elected with 26% of the vote, with Kanawha County Circuit Court judge Joanna I. Tabit receiving 22%, Eastern Panhandle Circuit Court Chief Judge Chris Wilkes receiving 13%, former State Senator Mark Hunt receiving 12%, and the 6 other candidates splitting the remainder. Armstead continued to serve the remaining time of Ketchum's term, which expired on January 1, 2021.

On August 14, 2018, due to the 2017-2018 expenses scandal (see below), Justice Davis retired. This triggered the second special election held on November 6, 2018. The Governor filled the vacancy until the election by appointing Evan Jenkins, who resigned from Congress to fill the seat. A total of 10 candidates filed for this seat as well. Evan Jenkins, the appointee was elected with 36% of the vote, with Dennise Renee Smith receiving 14%, former State Senate president Jeff Kessler receiving 12%, and the 7 other candidates splitting the remainder. Jenkins was to continue to serve the remaining time of Davis' term, which would expire on January 2, 2025, but he resigned on February 4, 2022.

=== 2020 ===
Three separate elections were held in May 2020.

The full-term (12 years) seats held by Justices Workman and Justice Armstead were contested. These elections were again held on a non-partisan basis and consisted of a separate election for each seat (previously when two seats were being contested a single "vote for two" election was held). The winner of each election took office in January 2021.

Justice Armstead was reelected, receiving 41% of the vote to 36% for former Justice Richard Neely and 23% for David Hummel.

Justice Workman did not seek re-election. William Wooton, a trial lawyer and former Democratic state senator, was elected with 31% of the vote, to 30% for Kanawha County Circuit Judge Joanna Tabit, and 20% each for Kris Raines and Jim Douglas.

A third, special, election, was held to fill the remainder of what was originally Loughry's term, then filled by appointment by Hutchison. This "Unexpired Term" runs from the certification of the final count in the May election, until January 2025, with the seat again up for election in May 2024. Justice Hutchison was elected with 39% of the vote to 35% for Lora Dyer and 25% for Bill Swartz.

=== Aborted 2022 election ===
Justice Jenkins resigned on February 4, 2022. He gave no public explanation for his decision. Because the filing period for the primary election had expired, the special election for the remainder of Jenkins' term, which expired on January 2, 2025, would have been held in the November 2022 general election, on a non-partisan basis. The governor would have appointed a successor to serve until the result of the election are certified.

However, the legislature then passed HB 4785, changing the length of the appointed term before an election for the remainder would be held from 2 to 3 years, meaning the governor's appointment will serve until January 1, 2025, with the seat up for election in May 2024.

The governor then on April 6, 2022, appointed C. Haley Bunn to serve the remainder of the term.

=== 2024 ===
The seats held by Justice Hutchison and Justice Bunn were up for 12-year teams in 2024. These elections were held on a non-partisan basis and during the May primary election. Each seat was elected separately. Justice Hutchison was eligible for his full judicial pension and will be well into his 80s by the time a new term expired and did not seek re-election. Because all circuit judges were also be up for re-election in 2024, none could seek a seat on the Supreme Court without forgoing a re-election attempt for their current judgeships.

Justice Bunn had no one file to run for her seat, and was elected unopposed.

Only one candidate, State Senator Charles Trump, filed for the open seat. He also was elected unopposed.

=== 2026 ===
During the 2025 regular session of the West Virginia Legislature, the state senate passed a bill that would make judicial elections partisan once again. No action has been taken on the bill since March 13, 2025.

== 2017–2018 expenses scandal and impeachment proceedings ==
In late 2017, WCHS-TV and other media outlets began reporting on spending by the court. Eventually, an ongoing investigation by the office of the United States Attorney for the Southern District of West Virginia was launched, and the court was audited by the state's legislative auditor.

The charges of rampant corruption led to calls for the impeachment of Loughry and any other member of the court found to be involved.

On July 11, 2018, Justice Ketchum resigned from the court. On July 31, 2018, he entered a guilty plea in the United States District Court for the Southern District of West Virginia in Charleston to one count of wire fraud. Justice Loughry was convicted in the same court on October 12, 2018, of seven counts of wire fraud, two counts of lying to federal investigators and one count each of mail fraud and witness tampering. He was originally scheduled to be sentenced on January 16, 2019; however, those proceedings are currently on hold.

On August 13, 2018, the full House of Delegates impeached the four remaining members of the court. On August 14, 2018, Justice Davis retired, effective August 13, 2018. The West Virginia Senate, however, refused to dismiss the articles of impeachment against Davis and scheduled her for trial along with the other justices.

In the first of the four impeachment trials, the Senate, in a 32-1-1 vote on October 2, 2018, decided not to remove Justice Walker from office. The Senate followed by agreeing, by voice vote, to publicly "reprimand and censure" Justice Walker for her actions in the scandal.

The remaining justices were scheduled to tried separately in October and November 2018. Rather than face trial, Justice Workman sued the Legislature before a reconstituted Supreme Court, which ruled in her favor on technical grounds.
