= List of politicians from Ohio County, West Virginia =

Below is a list of historic and otherwise prominent politicians from Ohio County, West Virginia:

- Aquilla B. Caldwell (R) - WV Attorney General (1863–1865, 1869–1871)
- Granville D. Hall (R) - WV Secretary of State (1865–1867)
- Chester D. Hubbard (R) - U.S. House of Representatives (1865–1869)
- Thayer Melvin (R) - WV Attorney General (1867–1869)
- Lewis Baker (D) - President of the WV Senate (1871–1872); US Ambassador to Costa Rica, El Salvador, and Nicaragua
- Elbridge G. Cracraft (D) - Speaker of the WV House of Delegates (1871–1872)
- William M. Miller (D) - Speaker of the WV House of Delegates (1872–1875)
- James Paull (D) - Supreme Court of Appeals of West Virginia (1873–1875)
- Sobieski Brady (D) - WV Secretary of State (1877–1881)
- Joseph J. Woods (D) - Speaker of the WV House of Delegates (1883–1885, 1889–1891)
- Alfred Caldwell (D) - WV Attorney General (1885–1893)
- John O. Pendleton (D) - U.S. House of Representatives (1889–1895)
- Thomas S. Riley (D) - WV Attorney General (1893–1897)
- Blackburn B. Dovener (R) - U.S. House of Representatives (1895–1907)
- George W. Atkinson (R) - U.S. House of Representatives (1889–1891); Governor of West Virginia (1897–1901);
- Nelson E. Whitaker (R) - President of the WV Senate (1897–1899)
- Nathan B. Scott (R) - U.S. Senator (1899–1911)
- William P. Hubbard (R) - U.S. House of Representatives (1907–1911)
- Walter L. Fisher (R) - United States Secretary of the Interior (1911–1913)
- Benjamin L. Rosenbloom (R) - U.S. House of Representatives (1921–1925)
- Carl G. Bachmann (R) - U.S. House of Representatives (1925–1933)
- John William Cummins (R) - Speaker of the WV House of Delegates (1929–1931)
- James B. Riley (D) - Supreme Court of Appeals of West Virginia (1937–1958)
- A. C. Schiffler (R) - U.S. House of Representatives (1939–1941, 1943–1945)
- Francis J. Love (R) - U.S. House of Representatives (1947–1949)
- Thomas B. Miller (D) - Supreme Court of Appeals of West Virginia (1977–1994)
- Arthur M. Recht (D) - Supreme Court of Appeals of West Virginia (1994–1996)
- David McKinley (R) - U.S. House of Representatives (2011–present)
