= 1992 West Virginia Attorney General election =

- November 3, 1992
Nominee	Darrell McGraw	Bob Gould
Party	Democratic	Republican
Popular vote	307,600	288,865
Percentage	51.57%	48.43%
- County results McGraw: 50–60% 60–70% 70–80% Gould: 50–60% 60–70%
Attorney General before election
Mario Palumbo
Democratic
Elected Attorney General
Darrell McGraw
Democratic

An election was held on November 3, 1992, to elect the Attorney General of West Virginia. Incumbent Democratic Attorney General Mario Palumbo chose not to seek re-election to a full term, instead choosing to run for governor.

Democratic nominee Darrell McGraw beat Republican nominee and lawyer Robert Gould.

== Democratic primary ==
Four days before the Democratic primary on May 12, two women, whose faces and voices were electronically altered, appeared on WCHS-TV accusing Ed ReBrook of sexual misconduct. The station subsequently aired similar charges by four other women whose identities were made public. One of the accusers claimed that ReBrook asked for oral sex in return for legal work. Later it was discovered that Mary Healey, a person who once shared an office space with ReBrook, admitted she was one of the two original women who anonymously accused him on WCHS-TV, saying that he had made sexual advances towards her. ReBrook denied the allegations and sued WCHS-TV for $20 million.

=== Candidates ===
==== Nominee ====
- Darrell McGraw, former justice of the Supreme Court of Appeals of West Virginia.

==== Eliminated in primary ====
- Ed ReBrook, Charleston lawyer.

==== Declined ====
- Mario Palumbo, incumbent Attorney General. (ran for governor)

=== Polling ===
Poll source	Date(s) administered	Sample size	Margin of error	Darrell McGraw	Ed ReBrook	Undecided
West Virginia Poll	April 27 - 30, 1992	318 (V)	± 5.5%	31%	13%	56%
West Virginia Poll	February, 1992	325 (RV)	± 5.4%	35%	15%	50%

=== Results ===
May 12, Democratic primary
Party	Candidate	Votes	%
Democratic	Darrell McGraw	156,409	55.76%
Democratic	Ed ReBrook	124,091	44.24%
Total votes		280,500	100.00%

== Republican primary ==
=== Candidates ===
==== Nominee ====
- Robert James Gould, lawyer.

=== Results ===
May 12, Republican primary
Party	Candidate	Votes	%
Republican	Robert J. Gould	88,576	100.00%
Total votes		88,576	100.00%

== General election ==
Heading in to the general election, there were questions about whether Gould met the qualifications for the five-year requirement to live in West Virginia to run for public office.

=== Results ===
1992 West Virginia Attorney General election
Party	Candidate	Votes	%
Democratic	Darrell McGraw	307,600	51.57%
Republican	Robert J. Gould	288,865	48.43%
Total votes		596,465	100.00%
Democratic hold			
