= 1990 West Virginia Attorney General special election =

- November 6, 1990
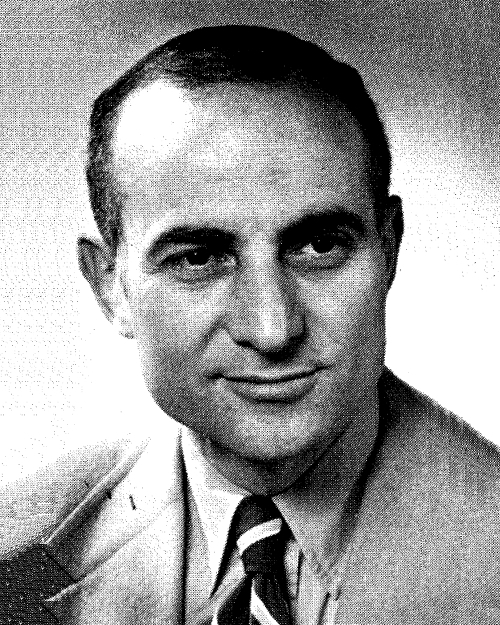
Nominee	Mario Palumbo
Party	Democratic
Popular vote	271,685
Percentage	100.00%
- County results Palumbo: 100%
Attorney General before election
Roger W. Tompkins
Democratic
Elected Attorney General
Mario Palumbo
Democratic

The 1990 West Virginia Attorney General special election took place on November 6, 1990, to elect the Attorney General of West Virginia. The election was held to complete the unexpired term of Charlie Brown, who resigned in August 1989 to end a grand jury investigation against him. Incumbent Democratic Attorney General Roger W. Tompkins, who was appointed by governor Gaston Caperton, chose not to seek election to a full term.

Former Democratic State Senator Mario Palumbo won the general election unopposed, as the Republicans did not field a candidate.

== Democratic primary ==
=== Candidates ===
==== Nominee ====
- Mario Palumbo, former state senator from the 8th district (1968-1988) and candidate for Governor in 1988.

==== Eliminated in primary ====
- Brenda Craig Ellis, former Deputy Attorney General.
- Richard Facemire, Clay County prosecutor.

==== Declined ====
- Roger W. Tompkins II, incumbent Attorney General and former Majority leader of the West Virginia House of Delegates.

=== Polling ===
Poll source	Date(s) administered	Sample size	Margin of error	Mario Palumbo	Brenda Ellis	Richard Facemire	Undecided
West Virginia Poll	Feb. 5 - 8, 1990	214 (V)	± 4.5%	33%	15%	6%	46%
West Virginia Poll	Feb. 26 - 28, 1990	390 (V)	± 5%	30.5%	19%	17.9%	32.6%

=== Results ===
May 8, Democratic primary
Party	Candidate	Votes	%
Democratic	Mario Palumbo	128,492	59.07%
Democratic	Brenda Craig Ellis	53,845	24.76%
Democratic	Richard Facemire	35,185	16.17%
Total votes		217,522	100.00%

== General election ==
=== Results ===
1990 West Virginia Attorney General special election
Party	Candidate	Votes	%
Democratic	Mario Palumbo	271,685	100.00%
Total votes		271,685	100.00%
Democratic hold			
