= Edgar P. Rucker =

American lawyer, politician, and businessperson

Honorable Edgar Parks Rucker
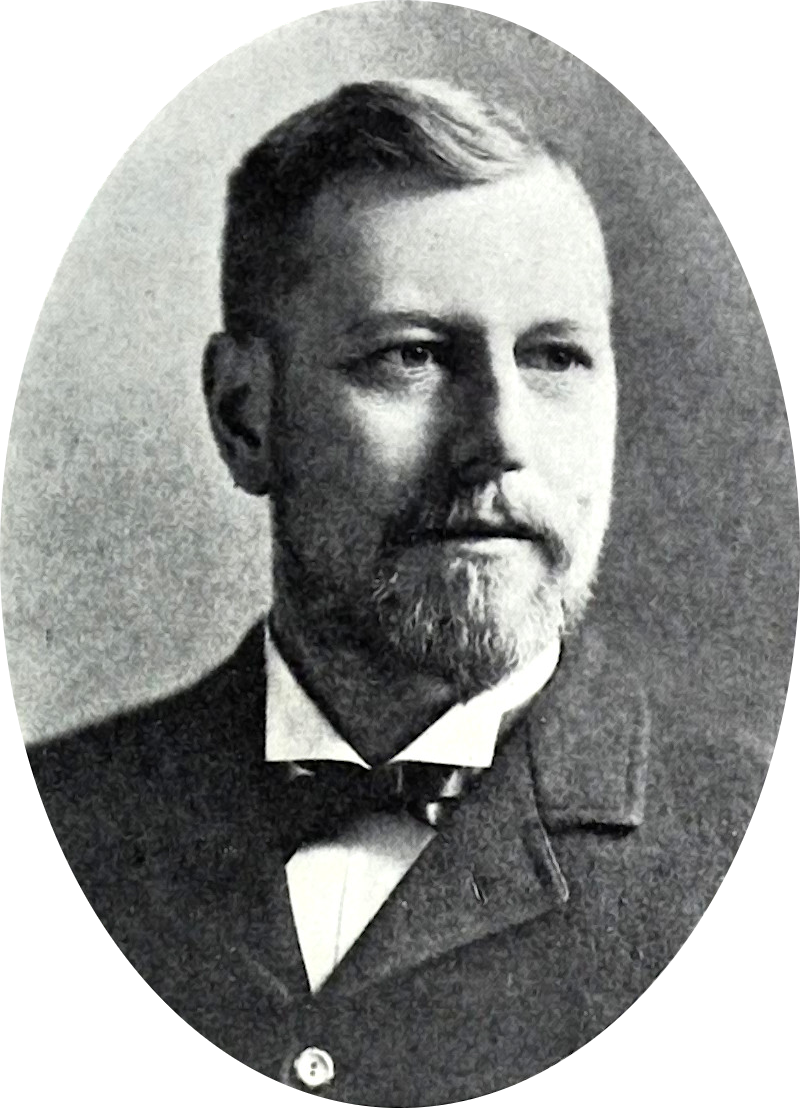
- Portrait of Rucker, published in 1905

12th Attorney General of West Virginia
- In office March 4, 1897 – March 3, 1901
- Governor: George W. Atkinson
- Preceded by: Thomas S. Riley
- Succeeded by: Romeo H. Freer

Personal details
- Born: December 23, 1861 Covington, Virginia, U.S.
- Died: April 21, 1908 (aged 46) Washington, D.C., U.S.
- Resting place: Old Stone Church Cemetery, Lewisburg, West Virginia, U.S.
- Party: Republican
- Spouse: Maude Applegate Rucker
- Relations: William W. Rucker (brother)
- Children: Margaret Clarke Rucker
- Parent(s): William Parks Rucker (father); Margaret Ann Scott Rucker (mother)
- Education: West Virginia University; Department of Law (LL.B.)
- Profession: Lawyer, politician, and businessperson

Edgar Parks Rucker (December 23, 1861 – April 21, 1908) was an American lawyer, politician, and businessman in the U.S. state of West Virginia. He was a Republican who served as the 12th attorney general of West Virginia from March 4, 1897, until March 3, 1901.

Rucker was born in Covington, Virginia, in 1861 and was raised in Lewisburg, West Virginia, where he attended school at Lewisburg Academy. He briefly worked as a schoolteacher in Greenbrier County public schools then earned a Bachelor of Laws from West Virginia University's Department of Law in 1887. He returned to Lewisburg and practiced law with his father William Parks Rucker. In July 1887, Rucker engaged in a duel with Lewisburg deputy postmaster Bedford Beirne, resulting in serious injuries to Beirne. Rucker relocated to Princeton, where he practiced law for three years; then to Bramwell, where he was editor of the Flat Top Monitor. He then moved to Welch and established a law firm in which he served as senior partner with Benjamin Franklin Keller among his firm's partners.

In 1888, Rucker unsuccessfully ran for the 8th Senate district seat and in 1892 for the 3rd congressional district seat. He served on the West Virginia University board of regents from 1895 to 1897. In 1896, Rucker was elected state attorney general, and during his tenure, his office was involved with cases resulting in increased tax revenue for the state. In addition to his political career, Rucker served as an incorporator and the president of several companies in Welch. After suffering poor health in his later years, Rucker died in 1908 in Washington, D.C. following surgery.

== Early life and education ==
Edgar Parks Rucker was born in Covington, Virginia, on December 23, 1861, during the early period of the American Civil War. He was the youngest of four sons of William Parks Rucker and Margaret Scott Rucker. Rucker's three older brothers were Hedley Scott Rucker; William Waller Rucker, U.S. Representative from Missouri; and James Thomas Rucker. During his early years, Rucker and his family relocated to Lewisburg in Greenbrier County, where he attended Lewisburg Academy. In his early adulthood, Rucker was a schoolteacher in Greenbrier County public schools. He then attended and completed a course in West Virginia University's Department of Law, where he won a prize for his essay entitled "The Works and Age of Milton", and graduated with a Bachelor of Laws in 1887.

== Law career ==
Immediately following his graduation, Rucker returned to Lewisburg, where he practiced law with his father. In July 1887, Rucker engaged in a duel with Lewisburg deputy postmaster Bedford Beirne, in which Rucker shot and seriously injured Beirne. The duel occurred after Beirne supposedly insulted Rucker. Rucker fired the first shot, which broke Beirne's wrist, then both men fired at each other and Beirne was shot in the chest. Rucker was arrested and bailed out of jail after the duel. When Beirne's condition worsened, however, Rucker was re-arrested and jailed.

After his marriage to Maude Applegate in January 1888, Rucker and his wife relocated to Princeton, where he practiced law for three years. On September 3, 1890, he was commissioned as a first lieutenant in the West Virginia National Guard's 2nd Regiment, Company A, which was organized and mustered into service in Princeton. In 1892, Rucker then moved to Bramwell in the burgeoning Pocahontas Coalfield region, where he remained for one year and served as the editor of the Flat Top Monitor, a Republican newspaper.

In 1893, Rucker and his family moved to Welch, which the previous year had become the county seat of McDowell County, and Rucker established a law practice there. Rucker served as the senior partner of his law firm, which initially consisted of Benjamin Franklin Keller and James L. Hamill, and was known as Rucker, Keller, and Hamill. This partnership lasted until 1898, after which Rucker was joined by other law partners, including Luther C. Anderson, William Wellington Hughes, and Daniel J. F. Strother. (Note: Rucker's law firm was variously known as Rucker, Keller, and Hamill; Rucker and Oldfield; Rucker, Anderson, and Hughes; and Rucker, Anderson, Strother, and Hughes.)

== Political and government career ==
Rucker took an interest in politics and was active in West Virginia's Republican Party. In 1888, he unsuccessfully ran as the party's candidate for the 8th district of the West Virginia Senate, losing by 403 votes. Due to his young age, he became known as "the boy candidate". In June 1892, the Republicans of West Virginia's 3rd congressional district met in Montgomery and selected Rucker as their candidate for the district's congressional seat. He lost the November election against Democratic incumbent John D. Alderson. Rucker served on the West Virginia University board of regents for a two-year term from 1895 until June 1, 1897. In February 1897, Rucker joined regents in advocating for appropriations from the West Virginia Legislature for a new building to accommodate the increased enrollment at West Virginia University.

=== Attorney general ===
In June and July 1896, Rucker was endorsed by McDowell County Republican Conventions as their candidate for Republican nominee for West Virginia attorney general. On July 23, 1896, at the state convention in Parkersburg, he was formally nominated as the Republican candidate for attorney general, and in November, he ran for election against Democratic incumbent Thomas S. Riley. On January 14, 1897, the West Virginia Legislature convened a joint assembly to canvass the returns of the 1896 election, and declared Rucker the 12th attorney general-elect with 105,432 votes to incumbent Riley's 94,060 votes.

Rucker commenced his tenure as attorney general on March 4, 1897. At the start of his term, he was directed by the West Virginia Board of Public Works to represent the state in the case Pittsburgh, C., C. & St. L. Ry. Co. v. Board of Public Works of West Virginia, 172 U.S. 32., and appeared before the U.S. Supreme Court alongside his predecessors Riley and Thayer Melvin. In November 1888, the court decided in favor of West Virginia, ruling the Pittsburgh, Cincinnati, Chicago and St. Louis Railroad and other railroad companies were required to pay taxes on their bridges across the Ohio River to the state of West Virginia. The taxable amount of the railroad bridge in question at Steubenville alone was $3,060 per year, with back taxes for four years, totaling $12,240 (equivalent to $473,688 in 2025), owed to West Virginia. Also during Rucker's term, the case Maryland v. West Virginia, in which Maryland claimed the South Branch Potomac River rather than the North Branch Potomac River as its true southern boundary, was ongoing.

In September 1897, Rucker went to Keystone to intervene in a mob intending to lynch Tom Major, who was being held in jail in connection with the murder of special officer Newt Hines. Rucker and local officials transported Major via freight engine from Keystone to the jail in Welch to ensure Major's safety and avoid a race riot. In October 1897, Rucker's office was also involved in the prosecution of the "Wheeling whiskey cases" in response to the banding together of Wheeling saloonkeepers to resist payment of state license taxes to sell whiskey. At that time, the saloonkeepers paid for licenses to sell beer and wine, which were $100 per year (equivalent to $3,870 in 2025), but continued to sell whiskey without paying for the annual $350-dollar license fee (equivalent to $13,545 in 2025). Rucker went to Wheeling and assisted Ohio County prosecuting attorney W. C. Meyer in instituting proceedings against the saloonkeepers who were violating state law. Ohio County made more than 1,700 indictments; however, Rucker and Meyer procured injunctions against the most-prominent violators, which resulted in those saloonkeepers agreeing to pay the full license tax and in West Virginia recovering $18,000 in taxes (equivalent to $696,600 in 2025). Rucker served as attorney general until March 3, 1901.

== Business career ==
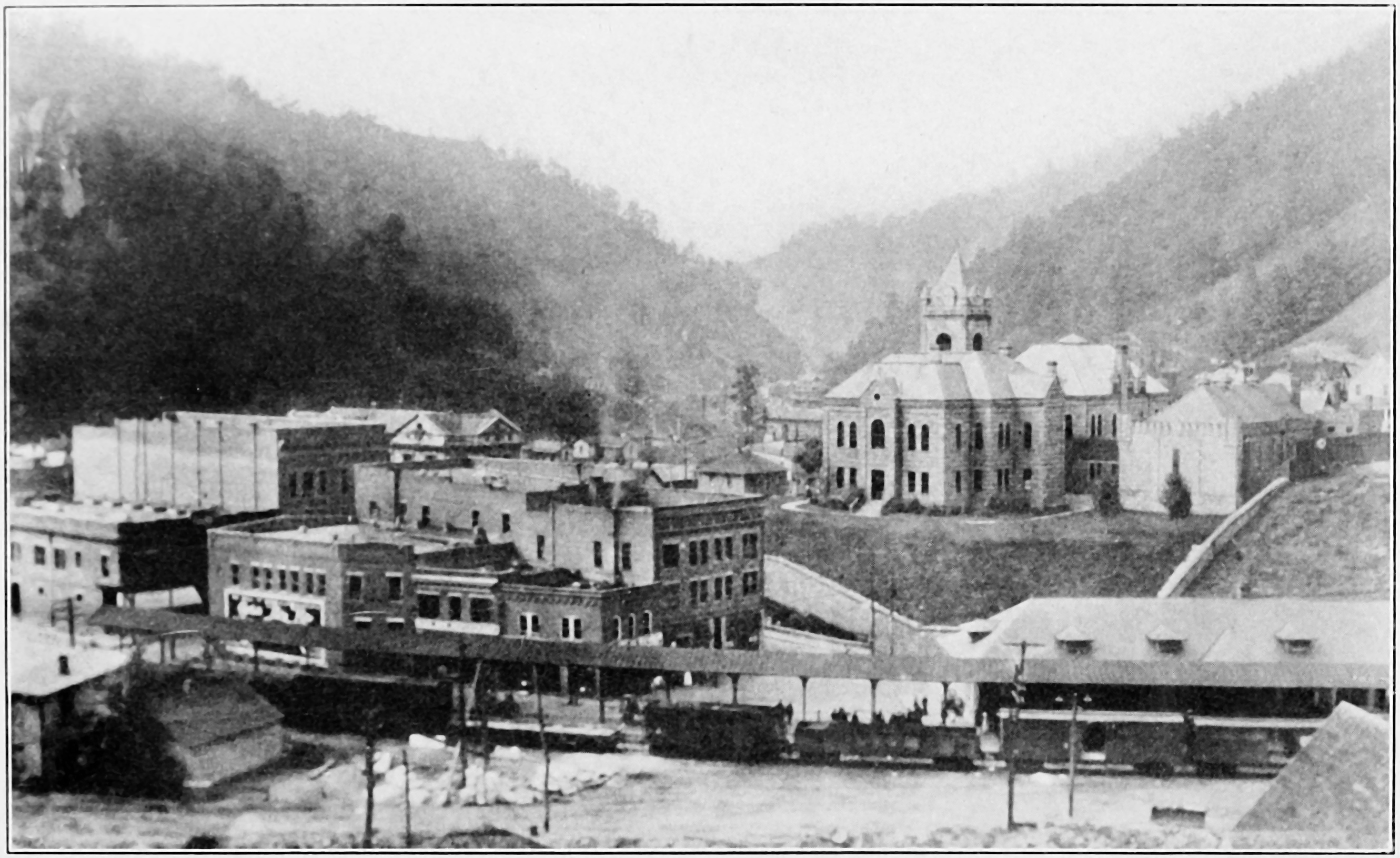
Downtown Welch, 1915

Rucker served as the president of several companies, including the Margaret Mining Company, the Hensley (or Hursley) Coal Company, the Merrimac Coal and Coke Company, the Slick Rock Coal Company, and the Welch Lumber Company. He also served as a director of the McDowell County Bank and a number of other corporations. In June 1896, Rucker was an incorporator of the McDowell Publishing Company in Welch, which was chartered for the purpose of publishing a newspaper and book printing. In October 1899, Rucker was an incorporator of the C. L. Ritter Lumber Company of Welch. In March 1905, Rucker was among several representatives of West Virginia's coal industry who met with Governor William M. O. Dawson and state tax commissioner Charles W. Dillon to protest a state law that taxed coal, oil, and gas leases as personal property.

== Personal life ==
=== Marriage and children ===
Rucker married Maude Applegate of Keytesville, Missouri, on January 11, 1888, at the residence of her uncle L. M. Applegate near Keytesville; according to the Chariton Courier, the wedding was a "quiet and unpretentious affair". Rucker and his wife had one daughter, Margaret Clarke Rucker, who was born in Princeton on November 4, 1890, and married Edward Robert Shannon Jr. on June 12, 1916. She and Edward had one daughter, Margaret "Peggy" Rucker Shannon, who was born July 6, 1917, in Cincinnati.

=== Organizational memberships ===
Rucker served as president of the West Virginia League of Republican Clubs in 1894. He was a member of the Independent Order of Odd Fellows and an active member of the Methodist Episcopal Church, South, where he worked to secure a new building for the congregation and served as a delegate to the Methodist General Conference of 1902.

== Later life and death ==
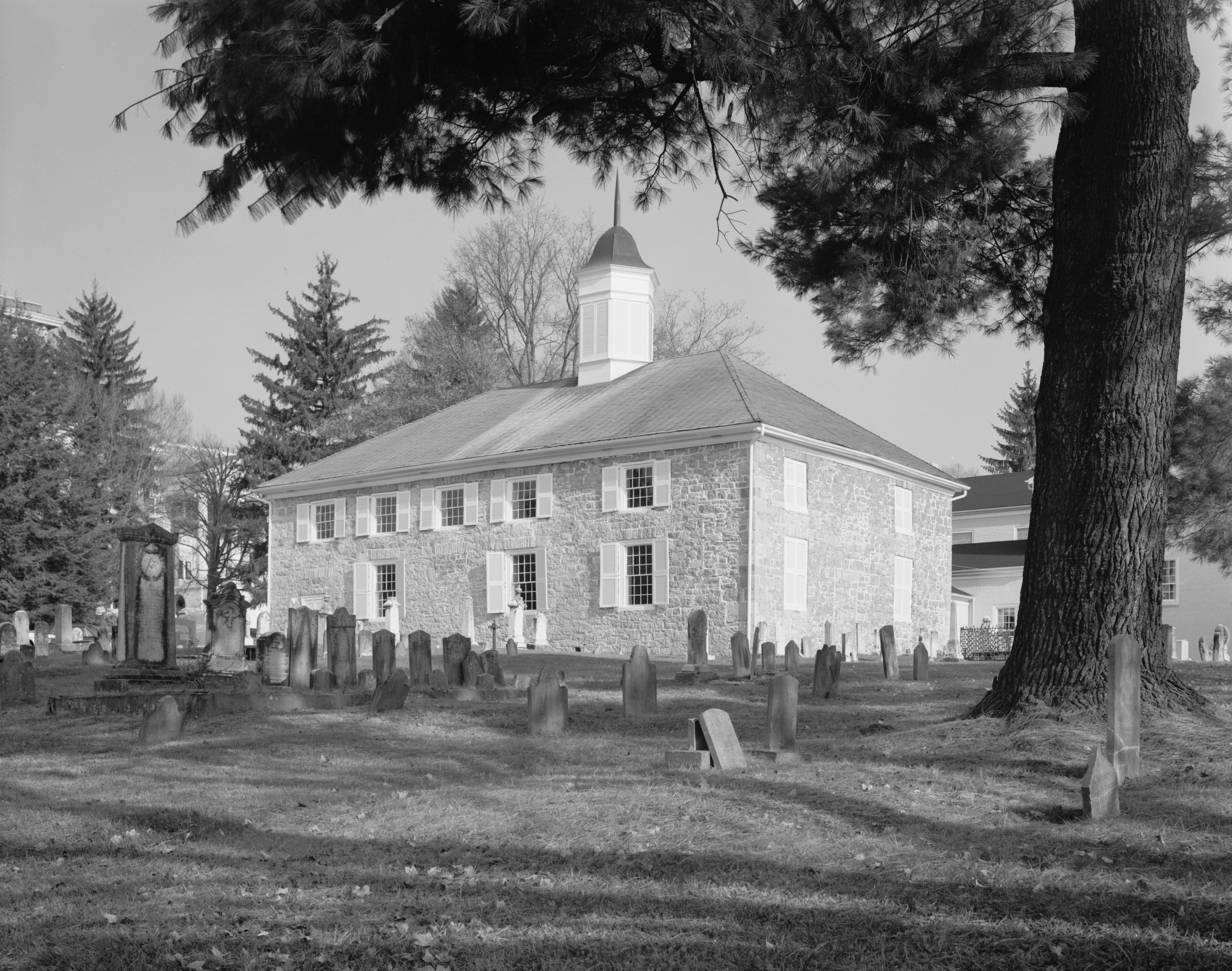
Old Stone Church cemetery in Lewisburg

Rucker's final years were dedicated to his law practice and his businesses in Welch. News reports in 1903 and 1904 noted Rucker's poor health. He remained ill and for three years, he consulted specialists for a cure. In April 1908, Rucker underwent surgery at Episcopal Hospital in Washington, D.C., to remove from his nose a malignant polyp that had caused a partial loss of eyesight. He died following complications from the operation at 5 p.m. on April 21, 1908, and was buried at the Old Stone Church cemetery in Lewisburg.

Following Rucker's death, his wife and daughter relocated to Cincinnati. At the West Virginia Republican Party's 6th Senate district meeting at Keystone in August 1908, a resolution expressing sorrow at Rucker's death was passed. Former Governor George W. Atkinson said of Rucker in his book "Bench and Bar of West Virginia" (1919):

General Rucker was an unusually brilliant and successful lawyer. Always intensely active, wholly devoted to the interests of his clients, ever resourceful, particularly in an emergency, a fine orator, a born leader of men, he was a good lawyer and a splendid gentleman.

== Bibliography ==
- Atkinson, George W., ed. (1919). Bench and Bar of West Virginia. Charleston, West Virginia: Virginian Law Book Company. OCLC 8899470 – via Internet Archive.
- Atlantic Publishing and Engraving Company, ed. (1894). Encyclopædia of Contemporary Biography of West Virginia. New York City, New York: Atlantic Publishing and Engraving Company. OCLC 1044627533 – via Internet Archive.
- Harris, John T., ed. (1916). "West Virginia Legislative Hand Book and Manual and Official Register" (PDF). West Virginia Blue Book. Charleston, West Virginia. ISSN 0364-7323. OCLC 1251675. Archived (PDF) from the original on August 13, 2021.
- Lewis, Virgil A. (1912). History and Government of West Virginia. New York City & Cincinnati: American Book Company. OCLC 609213478 – via Internet Archive.
- McCamic, Charles, ed. (1909). Proceedings of the Twenty-Fifth Annual Meeting of the West Virginia Bar Association Held at Webster Springs, West Virginia, July 7 and 8, 1909. Sistersville, West Virginia: The Oil Review Publishing Company. OCLC 769697925. Archived from the original on January 15, 2022 – via HathiTrust.
- Murphy, Robert E., ed. (1905). Progressive West Virginians: Some of the Men Who Have Built Up and Developed the State of West Virginia. Wheeling, West Virginia: The Wheeling News. OCLC 794221825 – via Internet Archive.
- Rucker, Edgar P., ed. (1899). Biennial Report of the Attorney General of West Virginia, Years 1897–98. Charleston, West Virginia: Office of the Attorney General of West Virginia. Archived from the original on January 17, 2022 – via Google Books.
- State of West Virginia Adjutant General's Office, ed. (1891). Biennial Report of the Adjutant General of the State of West Virginia, for the Years 1889 and 1890. Charleston, West Virginia: Moses W. Donnally, Public Printer – via Internet Archive.
- West Virginia University (1896). West Virginia University Catalogue 1895-6. Announcements. Morgantown, West Virginia: West Virginia University. Archived from the original on January 16, 2022 – via HathiTrust.
- West Virginia University (1897). Catalogue of the West Virginia University for 1896-1897. Announcements. Wheeling, West Virginia: West Virginia Printing Company. Archived from the original on January 16, 2022 – via HathiTrust.
- West Virginia University (1901). The Manticola. Vol. III. Morgantown, West Virginia: The Acme Publishing Company. OCLC 1049671763 – via Internet Archive.
- Wood, Sadie Rucker, ed. (1932). The Rucker Family Genealogy with their Ancestors, Descendants, and Connections. Richmond, Virginia: Old Dominion Press. OCLC 608476644. Archived from the original on January 15, 2022 – via HathiTrust.

Legal offices
Preceded by Thomas S. Riley	Attorney General of West Virginia; March 4, 1897 – March 3, 1901	Succeeded by Romeo H. Freer
