= 2004 West Virginia Attorney General election =

- November 2, 2004
Nominee	Darrell McGraw	Hiram Lewis IV
Party	Democratic	Republican
Popular vote	359,491	353,545
Percentage	50.42%	49.58%
- County results McGraw: 50–60% 60–70% 70–80% Lewis: 50–60% 60–70% 70–80%
Attorney General before election
Darrell McGraw
Democratic
Elected Attorney General
Darrell McGraw
Democratic

The 2004 West Virginia Attorney General election took place on November 2, 2004, to elect the Attorney General of West Virginia.

Incumbent Democratic Attorney General Darrell McGraw narrowly won re-election to a fourth term, beating Republican nominee and Morgantown attorney Hiram Lewis IV, 50.4% to 49.6%.

== Democratic primary ==
=== Candidates ===
==== Nominee ====
- Darrell McGraw, incumbent Attorney General.

=== Results ===
Democratic primary
Party	Candidate	Votes	%
Democratic	Darrell McGraw (incumbent)	213,389	100.00%
Total votes		213,389	100.00%

== Republican primary ==
=== Candidates ===
==== Nominee ====
- Hiram "Bucky" Lewis IV, Morgantown attorney.

=== Results ===
Republican primary
Party	Candidate	Votes	%
Republican	Hiram Lewis IV	89,273	100.00%
Total votes		89,273	100.00%

== General election ==
=== Results ===
2004 West Virginia Attorney General election
Party	Candidate	Votes	%
Democratic	Darrell McGraw (incumbent)	359,491	50.42%
Republican	Hiram Lewis IV	353,545	49.58%
Total votes		713,036	100.00%
Democratic hold			
