= 2000 West Virginia Attorney General election =

- November 7, 2000
Nominee	Darrell McGraw
Party	Democratic
Popular vote	465,047
Percentage	100.00%
- County results McGraw: 100%
Attorney General before election
Darrell McGraw
Democratic
Elected Attorney General
Darrell McGraw
Democratic

The 2000 West Virginia Attorney General election took place on November 7, 2000, to elect the Attorney General of West Virginia.

Incumbent Democratic Attorney General Darrell McGraw won re-election to a third term unopposed, as the Republicans did not field a candidate.

== Democratic primary ==
=== Candidates ===
==== Nominee ====
- Darrell McGraw, incumbent Attorney General

=== Results ===
2000 West Virginia Attorney Democratic primary election
Party	Candidate	Votes	%
Democratic	Darrell McGraw (incumbent)	217,070	100.00%
Total votes		217,070	100.00%

== General election ==
=== Results ===
2000 West Virginia Attorney general election
Party	Candidate	Votes	%
Democratic	Darrell McGraw (incumbent)	465,047	100.00%
Total votes		465,047	100.00%
Democratic hold			
