= Roger W. Tompkins II =

West Virginia attorney general

31st Attorney General of West Virginia
- In office September 15, 1989 – January 14, 1991
- Governor: Gaston Caperton
- Preceded by: Charlie Brown
- Succeeded by: Mario Palumbo

Member of the West Virginia House of Delegates from the 17th district
- In office December 1, 1974 – December 1, 1982

Personal details
- Born: Roger William Tompkins II; November 14, 1936 Cedar Grove, West Virginia, United States
- Died: November 11, 1997 (aged 60)
- Party: Democratic
- Spouse: Patricia Vandergrift (m. 1983)
- Education: West Virginia University (BA); The Queen's College, Oxford (BPhil, MA); Yale Law School (LLB)
- Occupation: Lawyer; politician

Roger William Tompkins II (November 14, 1936 – November 11, 1997) was an American lawyer and politician. He served in the West Virginia House of Delegates and as the 31st attorney general of West Virginia from 1989 to 1991.

== Biography ==
Tompkins was born on November 14, 1936 in Cedar Grove, West Virginia. He was the cousin of author Mary Lee Settle and the great-grandson of William Tompkins, Jr. He was the last member of the Tompkins family to live in The William Tompkins House.

Tompkins attended West Virginia University, where he served as student body president from 1956 - 1957 and graduated with his Bachelor of Arts in 1958. Tompkins was awarded a Rhodes Scholarship to attend the University of Oxford in 1958, where he received a second bachelor's degree in philosophy in 1961, and a Master of Arts in economics in 1967 from The Queen's College. He went on to receive his LLB from Yale Law School in 1964 and practiced law as an attorney in Charleston, West Virginia.

Tompkins married Patricia (Patty) Vandergrift Tompkins on January 8, 1983 at Cedar Grove.

== Political career ==
Tompkins served in the West Virginia House of Delegates, representing Kanawha County from 1975 to 1982. From 1979 - 1982, Tompkins was the Democratic House Majority Leader.

Tompkins was appointed West Virginia attorney general on September 15, 1989 by Governor Gaston Caperton to fill the vacancy caused by the resignation of Charlie Brown on August 21, 1989. Tompkins declined to seek reelection in the 1990 West Virginia Attorney General special election.

== Death ==
Tompkins died from complications from Alzheimer's disease at the age of 60 in 1997.
