= Cedar Grove (Cedar Grove, West Virginia) =

Historic house in West Virginia, United States

- U.S. National Register of Historic Places
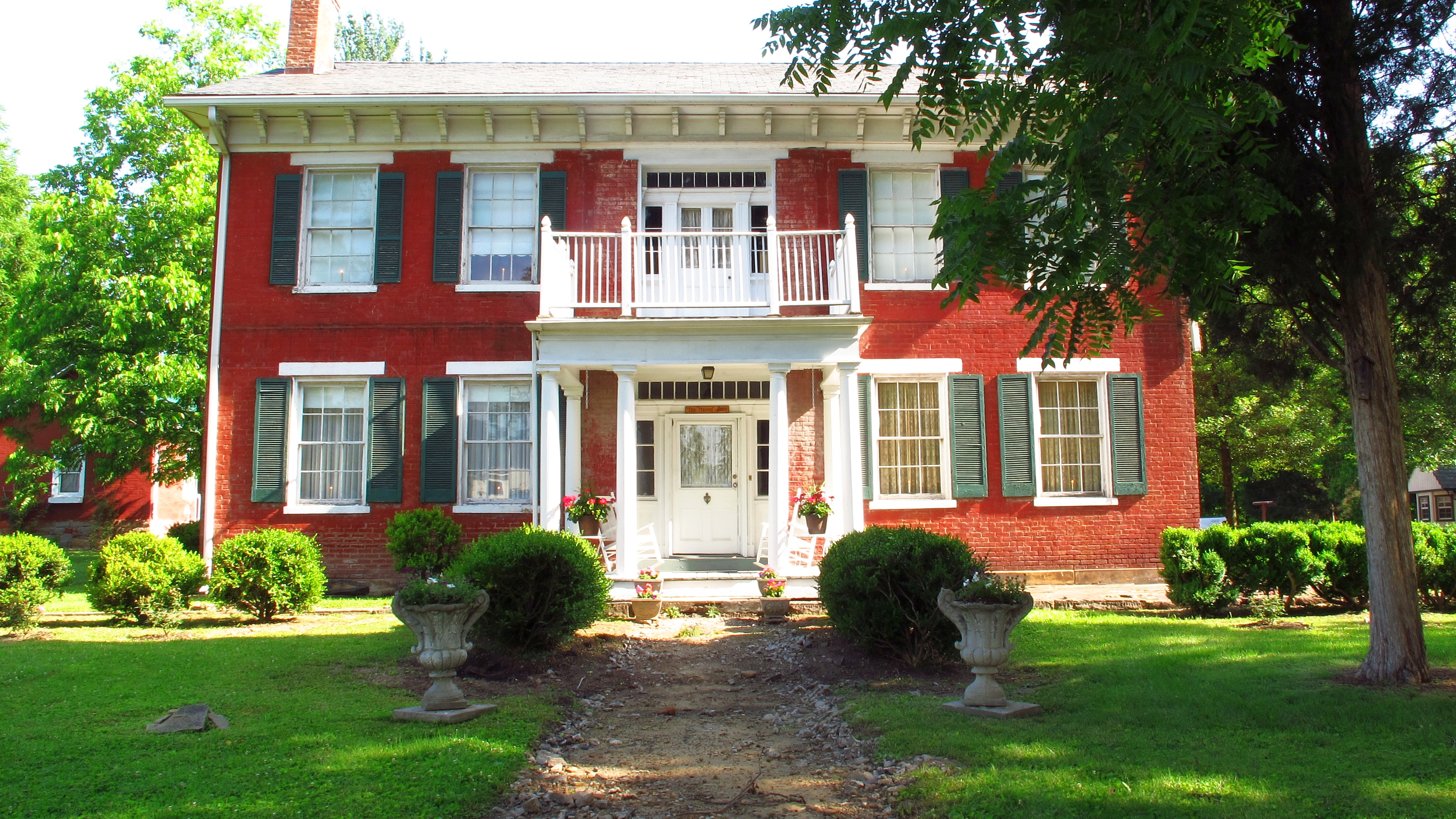
- William Tompkins House

- Location within West Virginia Location within the United States
- Location: SE of jct. of U.S. 60 and Kanawha and James River Tpke., Cedar Grove, West Virginia
- Coordinates: 38°13′17″N 81°25′41″W
- Area: 1 acre (0.40 ha)
- Built: 1844
- Architectural style: Colonial
- NRHP reference No.: 75001893
- Added to NRHP: March 10, 1975

Cedar Grove, also known as the William Tompkins House, is a historic home located at Cedar Grove, Kanawha County, West Virginia.

It was listed on the National Register of Historic Places in 1975.

== Architecture ==
The two-story, five-bay, "double pile" rectangular brick house originally featured upper and lower verandas across the rear, but these were enclosed in the late 19th century. The colonial-style home features a small entrance portico with a second floor balcony.

The original structures of slave quarters still stand on the property behind the main house.

== History ==
Commissioned by William Tompkins Jr., a salt and natural gas entrepreneur, the house was built in 1844 by enslaved people with red bricks made on-site. The Tompkins family owned as many as 50 enslaved people by 1860. The house was left untouched during the Civil War since Tompkins's wife, Mrs. Rachel Grant Tompkins, possessed a letter from her nephew Ulysses S. Grant that called for Cedar Grove to be spared by Union troops.

In 1875, activist and pastor Adam Clayton Powell moved to Cedar Grove. At age 7, Powell and his family all found work at the "Tompkins Farm".

The house remained in the possession of the Tompkins family until 1999. Notable inhabitants including author Mary Lee Settle, who drew inspiration for her novels from the house and surrounding area of Kanawha County, and her cousin Roger Tompkins, 17th attorney general of West Virginia.

The house was sold in 1999 to local sisters Patty Ellis Thurman and Shirley Ellis Stennett. The house was temporarily renamed "The Haven" and used as a care home for the elderly.

== Present Status ==
The house was sold a second time in 2021 and is currently being used as an event space.
