= 1988 West Virginia Attorney General election =

- November 8, 1988
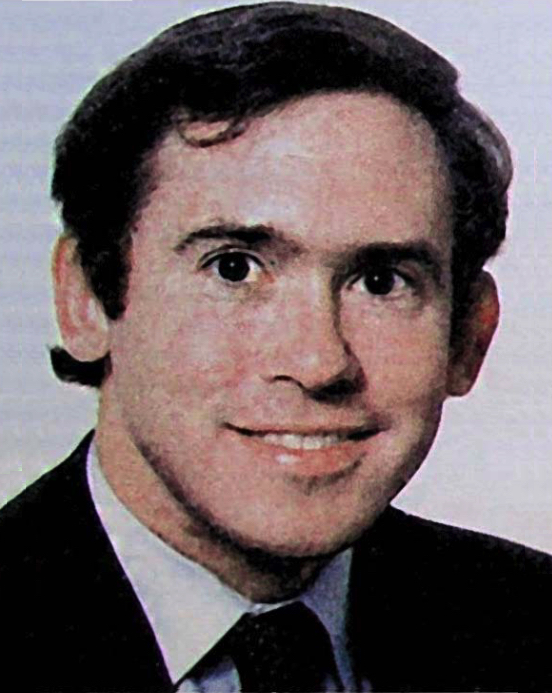
Nominee	Charlie Brown
Party	Democratic
Popular vote	441,474
Percentage	100.00%
- County results Brown: 100%
Attorney General before election
Charlie Brown
Democratic
Elected Attorney General
Charlie Brown
Democratic

The 1988 West Virginia Attorney General election took place on November 8, 1988, to elect the Attorney General of West Virginia.

Incumbent Democratic Attorney General Charlie Brown won re-election to a second term unopposed, as the Republicans did not field a candidate.

However, just nine months later, Brown would resign in August 1989 in exchange for an end to a grand jury investigation into allegations that he lied under oath and into his campaign financial records.

== Democratic primary ==
=== Candidates ===
==== Nominee ====
- Charlie Brown, incumbent Attorney General.

==== Eliminated in primary ====
- Harry Deitzler, President of the West Virginia Prosecuting Attorney's Association.

=== Results ===
1988 Democratic primary
Party	Candidate	Votes	%
Democratic	Charlie Brown (incumbent)	244,679	77.02%
Democratic	Harry Deitzler	73,012	22.98%
Total votes		317,691	100.00%

== General election ==
=== Candidates ===
- Democratic: Charlie Brown, incumbent Attorney General.

=== Results ===
1988 West Virginia Attorney General election.
Party	Candidate	Votes	%
Democratic	Charlie Brown (incumbent)	441,474	100.00%
Total votes		441,474	100.00%
Democratic hold			
