= Cedar Grove, West Virginia =

- Town
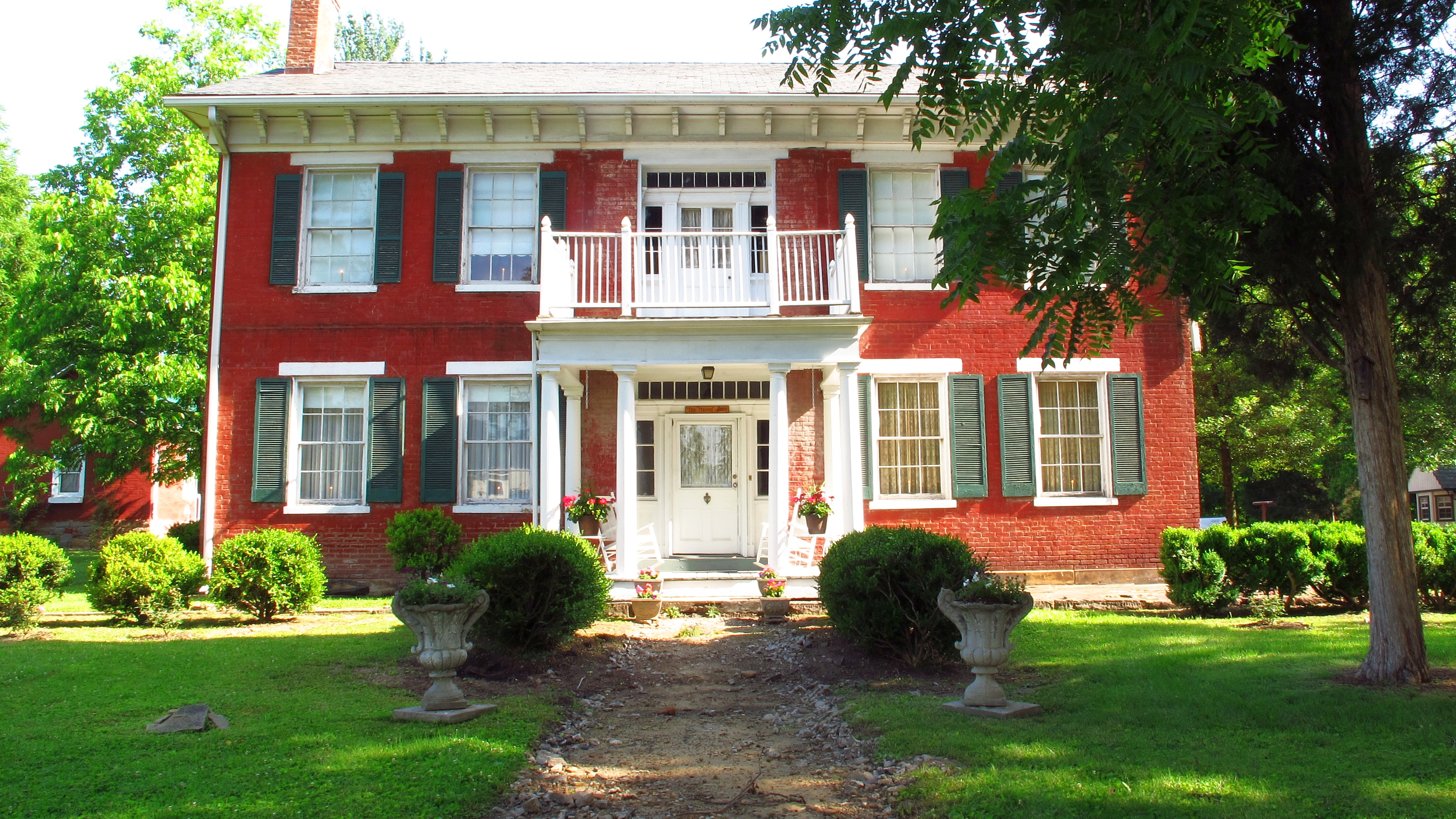
- William Tompkins House in Cedar Grove
- Nickname: The Grove "G-Town"
- Motto: We Can Supply Your Every Need
- Location of Cedar Grove in Kanawha County, West Virginia.
- Coordinates: 38°13′12″N 81°25′46″W
- Country: United States
- State: West Virginia
- County: Kanawha
- Incorporated: 1902

Area
  - Total: 0.72 sq mi (1.86 km^{2})
  - Land: 0.72 sq mi (1.86 km^{2})
  - Water: 0 sq mi (0.00 km^{2})
- Elevation: 614 ft (187 m)

Population (2020)
  - Total: 718
  - Estimate (2021): 700
- Time zone: UTC-5 (Eastern (EST))
  - Summer (DST): UTC-4 (EDT)
- ZIP code: 25039
- Area code: 304
- FIPS code: 54-13924
- GNIS feature ID: 1537132
- Website: https://townofcedargrovewv.com/

Cedar Grove is a town in Kanawha County, West Virginia, United States. The population was 714 at the 2020 census.

== History ==
Cedar Grove was incorporated in 1902. Its name is derived from the time the town was established, when a large juniper forest, misidentified as cedars by early settlers, was growing at that location. Walter Kelly attempted to settle in Cedar Grove in 1773, but he was soon killed by Native Americans. William Morris erected Fort Morris, sometimes referred to as Fort Kelly, a year later in 1774, creating the first permanent white settlement in the Kanawha Valley.

William Tompkins, a leading entrepreneur in natural gas and the Kanawha saltworks, purchased the land from Morris in 1824. Tompkins brought as many as 50 enslaved people to Cedar Grove to build landmarks including the William Tompkins House (1844) and the Little Brick Church (1853). Tompkins' wife, Rachel Grant Tompkins, was the aunt of Ulysses S. Grant, who ordered the protection of the Tompkins House during the Civil War and visited the town shortly after he was elected president. The Little Brick Church, also known as Virginia's Chapel, was occupied by both Union and the Confederate troops during the Civil War. Members of the Tompkins family continued to live in the town for generations, and in 1989, William Tompkins' great-grandson, Roger Tompkins, was elected 17th attorney general of West Virginia.

In 1964, the last "White Only" restaurant sign in West Virginia was removed from a local establishment named Tom's Place.

In 2016, Catherine Moore produced a radio documentary for West Virginia Public Broadcasting on Cedar Grove's history and influence on local author Mary Lee Settle, a descendent of the Tompkins family. The project was created in collaboration with photographer Roger May and also explored the legacy of slavery and racism in Cedar Grove. Moore discovered the existence of an unmarked slave cemetery and slave quarters still standing behind the Tompkins House.

Cedar Grove infrastructure suffered major damage to US Route 60 during the 2016 West Virginia flood and mudslides. In June of 2023, Melissa (Missy) Young became the first female mayor of Cedar Grove.

== Geography ==
Cedar Grove is located at 38°13′12″N 81°25′46″W (38.220096, -81.429449).

According to the United States Census Bureau, the town has a total area of 0.72 square miles (1.86 km^{2}), all land.

== Demographics ==
Historical population
Census	Pop.	Note	%±
1910	679		—
1920	918		35.2%
1930	1,110		20.9%
1940	1,411		27.1%
1950	1,738		23.2%
1960	1,569		−9.7%
1970	1,275		−18.7%
1980	1,479		16.0%
1990	1,213		−18.0%
2000	862		−28.9%
2010	997		15.7%
2020	718		−28.0%
2021 (est.)	700	▼	−2.5%
U.S. Decennial Census

=== 2010 census ===
As of the census of 2010, there were 997 people, 400 households, and 279 families living in the town. The population density was 1,384.7 inhabitants per square mile (534.6/km^{2}). There were 447 housing units at an average density of 620.8 per square mile (239.7/km^{2}). The racial makeup of the town was 96.6% White, 1.4% African American, 0.2% Native American, 0.1% Asian, 0.2% from other races, and 1.5% from two or more races. Hispanic or Latino of any race were 0.9% of the population.

There were 400 households, of which 34.3% had children under the age of 18 living with them, 46.5% were married couples living together, 16.5% had a female householder with no husband present, 6.8% had a male householder with no wife present, and 30.3% were non-families. 26.0% of all households were made up of individuals, and 15.8% had someone living alone who was 65 years of age or older. The average household size was 2.48 and the average family size was 2.97.

The median age in the town was 39.4 years. 25.1% of residents were under the age of 18; 6.8% were between the ages of 18 and 24; 25% were from 25 to 44; 27% were from 45 to 64; and 15.8% were 65 years of age or older. The gender makeup of the town was 46.4% male and 53.6% female.

=== 2000 census ===
As of the census of 2000, there were 862 people, 368 households, and 241 families living in the town. The population density was 1,143.8 inhabitants per square mile (443.8/km^{2}). There were 408 housing units at an average density of 541.4 per square mile (210.0/km^{2}). The racial makeup of the town was 98.72% White, 0.93% African American, and 0.35% from two or more races. Hispanic or Latino of any race were 0.23% of the population.

There were 368 households, out of which 28.5% had children under the age of 18 living with them, 42.7% were married couples living together, 15.8% had a female householder with no husband present, and 34.5% were non-families. 31.5% of all households were made up of individuals, and 18.2% had someone living alone who was 65 years of age or older. The average household size was 2.33 and the average family size was 2.90.

In the town, the population was spread out, with 21.6% under the age of 18, 9.7% from 18 to 24, 25.9% from 25 to 44, 21.8% from 45 to 64, and 21.0% who were 65 years of age or older. The median age was 40 years. For every 100 females, there were 90.7 males. For every 100 females age 18 and over, there were 86.7 males.

The median income for a household in the town was $23,250, and the median income for a family was $27,604. Males had a median income of $27,361 versus $22,222 for females. The per capita income for the town was $12,911. About 23.2% of families and 22.9% of the population were below the poverty line, including 30.1% of those under age 18 and 7.9% of those age 65 or over.

== Education ==
Cedar Grove is in the Kanawha County School District and home to Cedar Grove Elementary School, originally built in 1954 as a high school that has since closed. In 2021, it was announced that the middle school portion of the school building would also be closing, and students would be sent to the nearby town of Belle for secondary school.

== Recreation ==
Cedar Grove offers non-handicap fishing access behind Cedar Grove Community School, as well as a park for the youth to play.

== Utilities ==
The town of Cedar Grove supplies residents with trash pickup. Electricity for the area is supplied by Appalachian Electric and Power (AEP). Cable services are supplied by Suddenlink Communications, and various satellite providers are available in the area. Cedar Grove Fire Department is volunteer based, with paid emergency medical technicians on the ambulance service.

== Transportation ==
=== Highways ===
- US Route 60

== Notable people ==
- Roger Tompkins, politician and former attorney general of West Virginia
- Mary Lee Settle, author and founder of the PEN/Faulkner Award for Fiction
- Adam Clayton Powell Sr., pastor and a founder of the National Urban League
- Les Palmer, former NFL player for the Philadelphia Eagles
