= Mario Palumbo =

American politician (1933–2004)

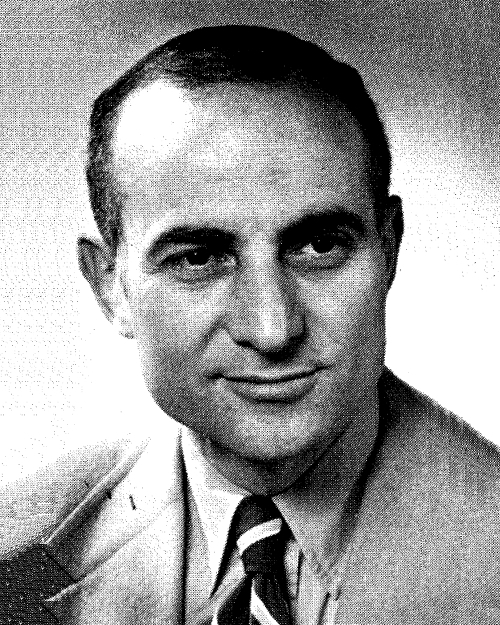

32nd Attorney General of West Virginia
- In office January 14, 1991 – January 18, 1993
- Governor: Gaston Caperton
- Preceded by: Roger W. Tompkins II
- Succeeded by: Darrell McGraw

Member of the West Virginia Senate from the 8th district
- In office December 1, 1968 – December 1, 1988
- Preceded by: Paul J. Kaufman
- Succeeded by: Mark Manchin

Personal details
- Born: Mario Joseph Palumbo; April 13, 1933 New York City, New York, U.S.
- Died: July 4, 2004 (aged 71)
- Party: Democratic
- Spouse: Louise Corey (m. 1969)
- Children: 2, including Corey
- Education: Morris Harvey College; West Virginia University

Military service
- Allegiance: United States
- Branch/service: United States Air Force
- Rank: Lieutenant colonel
- Unit: W.Va. Air National Guard

Mario Joseph Palumbo (April 13, 1933 – July 4, 2004) was an American attorney and Democratic politician from Kanawha County, West Virginia.

== Early life and education ==
Palumbo was born in Manhattan to Jack and Nancy Palumbo.

He graduated cum laude from Morris Harvey College in 1954, where he was student body president and recipient of the Liston Award for excellence in scholarship, character and athleticism, which was awarded to him during the NAIA Basketball Tournament. In 1957, he graduated from the West Virginia University College of Law.

== Career ==
In 1958, he joined the law firm of Woodroe, Kizer & Steed (now Kay, Casto & Chaney PPL).

Palumbo served as a legal officer with the West Virginia Air National Guard and retired in 1981 with the rank of lieutenant colonel.

He was elected to the West Virginia Senate in 1968 and served five consecutive terms, being re-elected in 1972, 1976, 1980 and 1984. During his tenure in the Senate, he served as chairman of the Committee on Education from 1971 to 1972 and as chairman of the Committee on the Judiciary from 1973 to 1980.

In 1990, Palumbo was elected attorney general to complete the unexpired term of his predecessor, Charlie Brown. In 1992, he ran for governor of West Virginia, running third in the Democratic Primary, behind then-Governor Gaston Caperton and then-State Senator Charlotte Pritt.

== Later life and death ==
Palumbo died on July 4, 2004, just one day after the death of his wife.

== Family ==
Mario was married to his wife, Louise, with whom he had two sons, Mario (Chris) and Corey Palumbo, a former member of the West Virginia State Senate.

Party political offices
Preceded by Charlie Brown	Democratic nominee for West Virginia Attorney General; 1990 (special)	Succeeded by Darrell McGraw
Legal offices
Preceded by Roger Tompkins	Attorney General of West Virginia; 1991–1993	Succeeded by Darrell McGraw
