= Blood Tie =

1977 novel by Mary Lee Settle

- First edition cover
- Author: Mary Lee Settle
- Publication date: June 12, 1979
- Awards: National Book Award for Fiction (1978)

Blood Tie is a 1977 novel by American novelist Mary Lee Settle, published by Houghton Mifflin. The novel, her eighth, won the 1978 National Book Award for Fiction. With the award, Settle became the fourth woman to win the NBA in fiction out of 32 winners.

The novel explores the going-ons of expatriates in a hotel in Ceramos on the Turkish coast. The characters in the novel are generally unlikable, and their foibles become the central focus of the novel's plot. Settle wrote the novel after returning to West Virginia, from time abroad, first in England then Italy.

== Reception ==
Though initial reception of the novel was less than positive, Settle won the National Book Award and critical consensus treats the novel as a turning point in her critical reception. The New York Times was generally positive about the book, writing that Settle "has done a remarkable job of capturing the [expatriate] culture that is, in a sense, the most important character in her book." George Garret in the Dictionary of Literary Biography called the novel "clearly a virtuoso work."
