= Donald R. Wilson =

American judge (1917–1983)

Donald R. Wilson (May 17, 1917 – November 28, 1983) was a justice of the Supreme Court of Appeals of West Virginia from January 26, 1976, to December 31, 1976.

Born in Detroit, Michigan, Wilson received a A.B. from Princeton University in 1939, and an LL.B. and J.D. from the University of Virginia School of Law in 1942. He served in the United States Army during World War II, attaining the rank of captain. He was national commander of the American Legion, and as president of Oglethorpe University.

On January 26, 1976, Governor Arch A. Moore Jr. appointed Wilson, a fellow Republican, to a seat on the state supreme court vacated by the resignation of Charles Harold Haden II, who had been appointed to a federal judgeship. Wilson remained in office until the end of 1976.

Wilson married Judith Ann Brady, with whom he had two sons. Wilson died in 1983, at the age of 66.

Political offices
| Preceded by Charles Harold Haden II | Justice of the Supreme Court of Appeals of West Virginia; 1976–1976 | Succeeded by Darrell McGraw |
