= Ralph F. Lozier =

American politician (1866–1945)

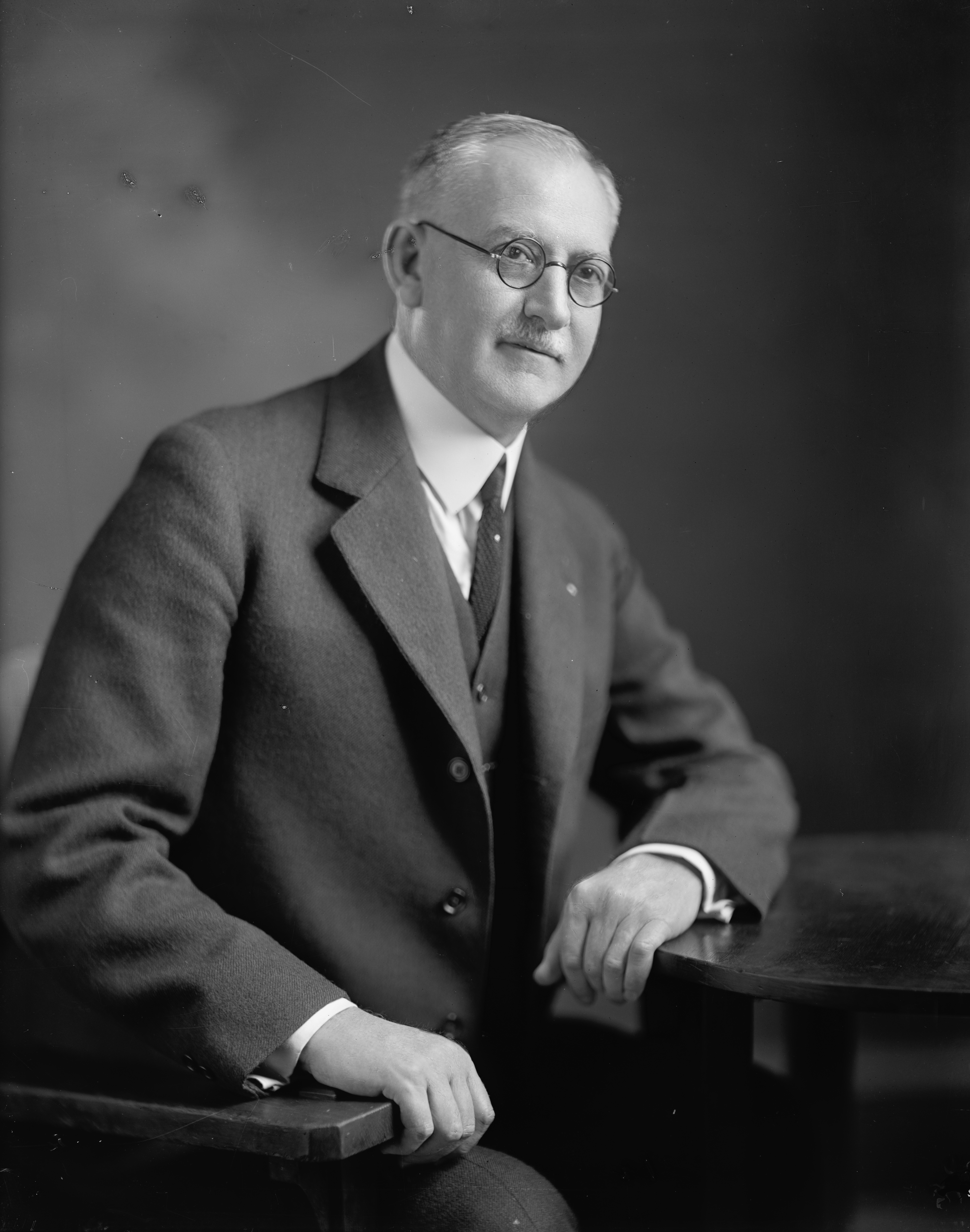

Member of the U.S. House of Representatives from Missouri
- In office March 4, 1923 – January 3, 1935
- Preceded by: William W. Rucker
- Succeeded by: District eliminated
- Constituency: 2nd district (1923–1933); At-large (1933–1935)

Personal details
- Born: January 28, 1866
- Died: May 28, 1945 (aged 79)
- Party: Democrat

Ralph Fulton Lozier (January 28, 1866 – May 28, 1945) was an American politician who served as a U.S. representative from Missouri.

== Biography ==
Born on January 28, 1866, in Hardin, Missouri, Lozier attended the public schools. He graduated from Carrollton High School in 1883 and engaged in teaching for several years before studying law.

He was admitted to the bar in 1886 and commenced practice in Carrollton. He was also interested in agricultural pursuits and the raising of livestock. He served as city attorney of Carrollton, Missouri, from 1915 to 1944 and was a delegate to the 1928 Democratic National Convention.

Lozier was elected as a Democrat to the 68th and to the five succeeding Congresses, serving from March 4, 1923, to January 3, 1935). He served as chairman of the Committee on the Census (72nd and 73rd Congresses). He was an unsuccessful candidate for renomination in 1934.

He served as judge of the circuit court of the 7th Judicial Circuit of Missouri in 1936. He resumed the practice of law with offices in Carrollton and Washington, D.C., and also engaged in agricultural pursuits in Carroll County, Missouri. He died on May 28, 1945, aged 79, in Kansas City, Missouri, and is interred in Oak Hill Cemetery in Carrollton.

U.S. House of Representatives
Preceded by William W. Rucker	Member of the U.S. House of Representatives from Missouri's 2nd congressional district 1923–1933	Succeeded by None (District dissolved)
Preceded by None (New district)	Member of the U.S. House of Representatives from Missouri's at-large congressional district 1933–1935	Succeeded by None (District dissolved)
