= James B. Riley =

American judge (1894–1958)

James B. Riley (July 25, 1894 – June 29, 1958) was a justice of the Supreme Court of Appeals of West Virginia from January 1, 1937, until his death on June 29, 1958.

Born in Wheeling, West Virginia, Riley was the son of Thomas S. Riley, who would become Attorney General of West Virginia. Riley attended the local schools in Wheeling and West Virginia University before receiving a B.A. from Georgetown, and J.D. from Columbia University. He served in the First World War, and practiced law in Marshall County, West Virginia.

Riley was elected to a twelve-year term on the court in 1936, and reelected to another in 1948. A Democrat, his death during the governorship of Republican Cecil H. Underwood enabled the first change to the political balance of the court in 18 years.

Riley died of a heart attack in his home at the age of 63.

Political offices
Preceded by Homer B. Woods	Justice of the Supreme Court of Appeals of West Virginia; 1937–1958	Succeeded by Robert T. Donley
