= Little Brick Church (Cedar Grove, West Virginia) =

Historic church in Virginia, United States

- The Little Brick Church
- U.S. National Register of Historic Places
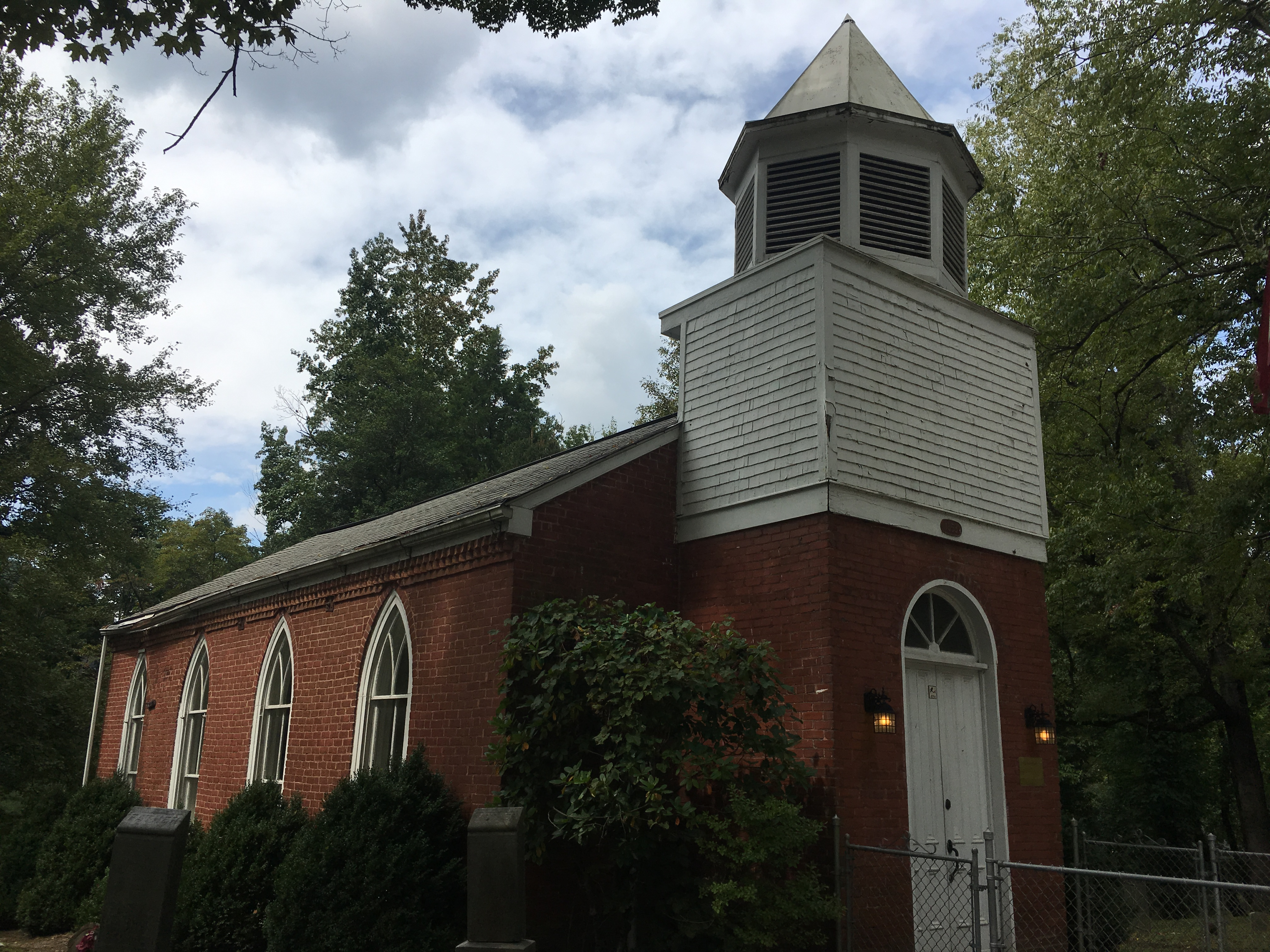

- Location within West Virginia Location within the United States
- Location: 0.75 mi. E of Kelley's Creek on US 60, Cedar Grove, West Virginia
- Coordinates: 38°13′3″N 81°25′34″W
- Area: 0.8 acres (0.32 ha)
- Built: 1853
- NRHP reference No.: 74002006
- Added to NRHP: December 16, 1974

The Little Brick Church, also known as Virginia's Chapel and William Tompkins Church, is a historic church that sits along US Route 60 in Cedar Grove, Kanawha County, West Virginia. It was built in 1853, and is a small brick structure on a stone foundation. The building was nearly square when built, but lengthened within a few years. It features a louvered octagonal cupola, with finial. In 1912 a bell tower was added to the church. A mural behind the pulpit was painted by Forrest Hull in the early 1900s. The Chapel was occupied during the American Civil War by both sides. Originally a non-denominational chapel, it was for some time used exclusively by a Methodist congregation.

It was listed on the National Register of Historic Places in 1974.
