= William W. Rucker =

American politician and lawyer (1855–1936)

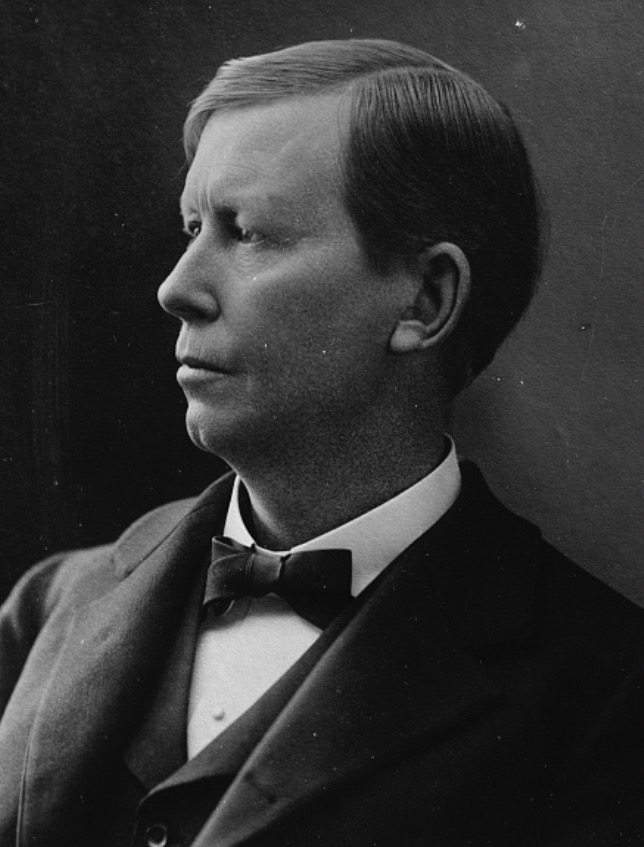
- Portrait of Rucker by Charles Milton Bell, taken between February 1901 and December 1903

Member of the U.S. House of Representatives from Missouri's 2nd district
- In office March 4, 1899 – March 3, 1923
- Preceded by: Robert N. Bodine
- Succeeded by: Ralph F. Lozier

Personal details
- Born: William Waller Rucker; February 1, 1855 Covington, Virginia, US
- Died: May 30, 1936 (aged 81) Keytesville, Missouri, US
- Party: Democratic
- Relations: Edgar P. Rucker (brother); Atterson Rucker (cousin)
- Occupation: Politician, lawyer

William Waller Rucker (February 1, 1855 – May 30, 1936) was an American politician and lawyer. A Democrat, he was a member of the United States House of Representatives from Missouri.

== Biography ==
Rucker was born on February 1, 1855, near Covington, Virginia, the son of William Parks Rucker and Margaret Ann (née Scott) Rucker. His brother was Edgar P. Rucker. In 1861, he and his parents moved to West Virginia, where he was educated at local common schools. In 1872 or 1873, he moved to Chariton County, Missouri. He worked as an educator until 1875, during which he read law under Mr. Huston.

On 1876, Rucker was admitted to the bar, beginning his law practice in Keytesville at age 21. From 1886 to 1892, he was prosecutor of Chariton County, and from 1892 to 1899, was judge of the Missouri 12th Circuit Court district. As judge, he presided over the murder trial for the perpetrators of the 1894 Meeks family murders.

Rucker was a Democrat. He was a member of the United States House of Representatives, from March 4, 1899, to March 3, 1923, representing Missouri's 2nd district. Between the 62nd and 65th Congresses, he was chairman of the Committee on the Election of the President, Vice President and Representatives in Congress. He was also a member of the Committee on the Judiciary. He lost the primary to the following election. In 1928, he unsuccessfully ran for Presidential elector. Ideologically, he was liberal.

After serving in Congress, Rucker returned to practicing law, in Keytesville. He also worked as a farmer. On May 20, 1880, he married Fannie Applegate; they had not had a child together by 1913. He was a member of the Methodist Episcopal Church, South. He died on May 30, 1936, aged 81, in Keytesville, and was buried on June 1, at the Keytesville City Cemetery.

U.S. House of Representatives
Preceded by Robert N. Bodine	Member of the U.S. House of Representatives from Missouri's 2nd congressional district 1899–1923	Succeeded by Ralph F. Lozier
