= Homer B. Woods =

American judge (1869–1941)

Homer Boughner Woods (July 16, 1869 – March 4, 1941) was a justice of the Supreme Court of Appeals of West Virginia from January 1, 1925 to December 31, 1936.

Born on a farm near Harrisville, West Virginia, to circuit-riding pastor Rev. Philip A. and Salina (Wells) Woods, Woods became a teacher. He attended Marietta College and then became county superintendent.

He "took a course in the law department" of West Virginia University", gaining admission to the bar in that state in 1892. In 1896, he was elected prosecuting attorney of Ritchie County, West Virginia. He was thereafter elected as a circuit judge for three terms. He was elected to a 12-year term on the West Virginia supreme court in 1924, and served until 1936, when he and Justice M. O Litz were both defeated in their respective bids for reelection.

In 1940, he was elected as a Republican to the West Virginia House of Delegates, and died during his term in office. Woods died in a hospital in Charleston, West Virginia, where he was recuperating from a period of ill health, at the age of 71.

Political offices
| Preceded by William H. McGinnis | Justice of the Supreme Court of Appeals of West Virginia; 1925–1936 | Succeeded by James B. Riley |
