= Les Palmer (American football) =

American football player (1923–2006)

No. 40, 15
- Position: Defensive back

Personal information
- Born: December 15, 1923; Cedar Grove, West Virginia, U.S.
- Died: April 15, 2006 (aged 82); Tampa, Florida, U.S.
- Listed height: 6 ft 0 in (1.83 m)
- Listed weight: 190 lb (86 kg)

Career information
- High school: East Bank (East Bank, West Virginia)
- College: North Carolina State
- NFL draft: 1948: undrafted

Career history
- Philadelphia Eagles (1948); Charlotte Clippers (1949)

Awards and highlights
- NFL champion (1948)
- Stats at Pro Football Reference

Leslie Hatfield "Footsie" Palmer, Jr. (December 15, 1923 – April 15, 2006) was an American professional football defensive back who played one season with the Philadelphia Eagles of the National Football League (NFL). He played college football at North Carolina State University

== Early life and college ==
Leslie Hatfield Palmer, Jr. was born on December 15, 1923, in Cedar Grove, West Virginia. He attended East Bank High School in East Bank, West Virginia.

Palmer served in the United States Army during World War II, and took part in the invasion of Normandy. He was later a two-year letterman for the NC State Wolfpack of North Carolina State University from 1946 to 1947. In 1947, he set the NCAA punting record with a 43.3 yard average.

== Professional career ==
Palmer signed with the Philadelphia Eagles of the National Football League (NFL) after going undrafted in the 1948 NFL draft. He played in five games for the Eagles during the 1948 season, punting four times for 148 yards while also returning one kick for 20 yards and one punt for eight yards. He wore jersey number 40 while with the Eagles. On December 19, 1948, the Eagles beat the Chicago Cardinals in the 1948 NFL Championship Game by a score of 7–0. However, Palmer did not play in the game.

Palmer started five games for the independent Charlotte Clippers in 1949. He wore number 15 with the Clippers.

== Personal life ==
Palmer moved to Tampa, Florida in 1953. He died on April 15, 2006, in Tampa at the age of 82.
