= Greenbrier County Schools =

School district in West Virginia, United States

Address
- 653 Church Street Lewisburg, West Virginia 24901; United States

District information
- Type: Public School District
- Superintendent: Jeff Bryant
- Schools: 14
- NCES District ID: 5400390

Students and staff
- Students: 4,705 (2021-22)
- Teachers: 338.50 (on an FTE basis)
- Student–teacher ratio: 13.90:1

Other information
- Website: greenbriercountyschools.org

Greenbrier County Schools is the operating school district within Greenbrier County, West Virginia. It is governed by the Greenbrier County Board of Education. The school district operates 14 public schools, including 2 high schools, 2 middle schools, 9 elementary schools, and an alternative education center.

== Board of education ==
The elected Greenbrier Board of Education is made up of the following members:

- Jeanie Wyatt, President
- Mary Humphreys
- Robert McClintic
- Paula Sanford-Dunford
- Andrew Utterback

== Schools ==
=== High schools ===
- Greenbrier East High School
- Greenbrier West High School

=== Middle schools (Formerly Junior High Schools) ===
- Eastern Greenbrier Middle School (Formerly Eastern Greenbrier Junior High)
- Western Greenbrier Middle School (Formerly Western Greenbrier Junior High)

=== Elementary schools ===
- Alderson Elementary School
- Crichton Elementary School
- Frankford Elementary School
- Lewisburg Elementary School
- Rainelle Elementary School
- Ronceverte Elementary School
- Rupert Elementary School
- Smoot Elementary School
- White Sulphur Springs Elementary School

=== Former Schools ===
- Alderson High/Junior High School
- Alvon/Neola School (Near White Sulphur Springs)
- Boling School (Caldwell)
- Charmco School
- Crichton High/Junior High (Quinwood)
- Crawley School
- East Rainelle School
- Frankford High/Junior High School
- Greenbrier High/Junior School (Ronceverte)
- Greenbrier Nursing School (Located at Greenbrier East High School)
- Lewisburg Intermediate School
- Lewisburg Elementary/Junior High School
- Rainelle High/Junior High School
- Renick High/Junior High School
- Renick Elementary School
- Rupert High/Junior High School
- Smoot High/Junior High School
- White Sulphur Springs High/Junior High School (Now Greenbrier Episcopal School)
- Williamsburg High/Junior High School
- Williamsburg Elementary School

=== Other ===
- Achievement Center (6-12)
