= McGraws, West Virginia =

Community in West Virginia, US

- Unincorporated community
- Location within West Virginia Location within the United States
- Coordinates: 37°40′15″N 81°27′47″W
- Country: United States
- State: West Virginia
- County: Wyoming
- Elevation: 1,808 ft (551 m)
- Time zone: UTC-5 (Eastern (EST))
  - Summer (DST): UTC-4 (EDT)
- ZIP codes: 25875
- Area codes: 304 & 681
- GNIS feature ID: 1543008

McGraws is an unincorporated community in Wyoming County, West Virginia, United States. McGraws is 12 miles (19 km) northwest of Mullens.

The community was named after John and M. P. McGraw, the original owners of the town site.
