= Mary Lee Settle =

American writer (1918–2005)

- Mary Lee Settle
- Born: July 29, 1918; Charleston, West Virginia, U.S.
- Died: September 27, 2005 (aged 87); Ivy, Virginia, U.S.
- Education: Sweet Briar College
- Occupation: Author
- Spouses: Rodney Weathersbee (m. 1939; div. 1946) Douglas Newton (m. 1946; div. 1956) William Tazewell (m. 1978)

Mary Lee Settle (July 29, 1918 – September 27, 2005) was an American writer.

She won the 1978 National Book Award for her novel Blood Tie. She was a founder of the annual PEN/Faulkner Award for Fiction.

== Life ==
Settle was born in Charleston, West Virginia, the daughter of Joseph Edward and Rachel Tompkins Settle. According to one report her father was a civil engineer in charge of worker safety at coal mines. According to another he owned a coal mine in Kentucky; Mary spent her childhood in Pineville, Kentucky, interrupted by a period in Florida when her father, drawn by the Florida land rush, participated in the design of Venice, Florida. Her family returned to Cedar Grove, West Virginia, where she spent her teenage years living with her grandmother at The William Tompkins House. After two years at Sweet Briar College, she moved to New York City in pursuit of a career as an actress and model, and tested for the part of Scarlett O'Hara in Gone with the Wind.

She married the Englishman Rodney Weathersbee in 1939 and moved to England. The couple had a son, Christopher Weatherbee. During World War II, she joined the British Women's Auxiliary Air Force, and then the Office of War Information. She divorced her first husband in 1946 and married the Englishman Douglas Newton from whom she divorced in 1956.

Upon returning to the US she started her writing career. She would later teach at Bard College, the Iowa Writers' Workshop, and University of Virginia.

She lived for many years in Canada, in England, and in Turkey.

In 1978, when she was 60, she married William L. Tazewell, an American writer and historian. He died in 1998.

== The Beulah Quintet ==
Settle wrote a wide variety of works, including non-fiction, but is most famous for a series of novels she called the Beulah Quintet. They cover the history of the development of people from seventeenth-century England to modern West Virginia: "In them she transferred the European tradition of a continuing fictional-historical saga to an American medium."

The composition of the quintet was complicated; the novels are not of the same form, not in chronological sequence, and do not have common characters or issues between them.

- O Beulah Land (1956)
- Know Nothing (1960)
- Prisons (1973), set earlier in time than O Beulah Land
- The Scapegoat (1980) and
- The Killing Ground (1982). This replaces Fight Night on a Sweet Saturday (1964), which Settle describes as her novel she most regrets.

== The PEN/ Faulkner awards ==
Settle founded in 1980 what is the United States's most prestigious and most lucrative prize for fiction: the PEN/Faulkner Awards, whose prize in 2005 was $15,000, equivalent to $24,727 in 2025. The acronym stands for 'Poets, Editors, and Novelists' and 'Faulkner' is for her hero, Southern novelist William Faulkner. The winners are selected by other authors.

Behind Settle's action is her experience as a member of the jury of the National Book Award in 1979, after being awarded its main prize the year before for Blood Tie.

== Critical reception of work ==
In 1978 Settle won the National Book Award for her novel Blood Tie, a novel set in Turkey.

In 1983 she won the Janet Heidinger Kafka Prize for The Killing Ground, the last volume of her series Beulah Quintet.

Brian Rosenberg remarked of the critical response to her work: "Settle has gone so unnoticed by the academic community that the most recurrent subject among those few who have written about her is the fact that she has gone so unnoticed."

== Death ==
Settle died of lung cancer in a hospice near Charlottesville, Virginia, on September 27, 2005, aged 87, while working on her last book, an imagined biography of Thomas Jefferson.

== Works ==
=== Novels ===
- The Love Eaters (1954)
- The Kiss of Kin (1955). Her first novel, based on her unpublished play of the same name, which was accepted for publication only after the success of The Love Eaters.
- O Beulah Land (1956) (First volume of what would be called the Beulah Quintet.
- Know Nothing (1960)
- Fight Night on a Sweet Saturday (1964)
- The Clam Shell (1970)
- Prisons (1973)
- Blood Tie (1977). This novel, which received the National Book Award in 1978, deals with American and British expatriates in Turkey.
- The Scapegoat (1980)
- The Killing Grounds (1982) "To replace Fight Night on a Sweet Saturday as the final volume of the Beulah Quintet" (list of her books in Learning to Fly).
- Celebration (1986)
- Charley Bland (1989). A widow of thirty-five returns to visit her parents in West Virginia and becomes involved in a love affair with the town's most eligible bachelor.
- Choices (1995). The life of a Southern belle who decided to work rather than play the debutante. The novel chronicles her adventures as a nurse during the bloody Kentucky miners strike and as an ambulance driver in the Spanish Civil War, through World War II, to her return to America in time to take part in the civil rights struggle.
- I, Roger Williams: A Novel (2002)

=== Memoirs ===
- All the Brave Promises: The Memories of Aircraft Woman 2nd Class 2146391 (1966)
- Turkish Reflections: A Biography of Place (1991)
- Settle, Mary Lee (1995). "Introduction". The Love Eaters. The Kiss of Kin. Columbia, South Carolina: University of South Carolina Press. ISBN 9781570030987.
- Addie: A Memoir (1998)
- Spanish Recognitions: The Road from the Past (2004)
- Settle, Mary Lee (2007). Freeman, Anne Hobson (ed.). Learning to Fly. A Writer's Memoir. New York: W. W. Norton. ISBN 9780393057324.

=== Other non-fiction ===
- Settle, Mary Lee (July 1950). "Yankee Doodle Dandy". Flair. 1 (6). [On men's clothing (dandies)]: 58–60. OCLC 24518707.
- Settle, Mary Lee (1972). The Scopes Trial: The State of Tennessee v. John Thomas Scopes. New York: Watts.
- Water World (1994). On what is in and under the oceans.
- The Story of Flight (1967)
