= Darrell McGraw =

American politician (1936–2024)

33rd Attorney General of West Virginia
- In office January 18, 1993 – January 14, 2013
- Governor: Gaston Caperton; Cecil H. Underwood; Bob Wise; Joe Manchin; Earl Ray Tomblin
- Preceded by: Mario Palumbo
- Succeeded by: Patrick Morrisey

Chief Justice of the Supreme Court of Appeals of West Virginia
- In office 1984–1988

Justice of the Supreme Court of Appeals of West Virginia
- In office January 1, 1977 – December 31, 1988
- Preceded by: Donald R. Wilson
- Succeeded by: Margaret Workman

Personal details
- Born: November 8, 1936 McGraws, West Virginia, U.S.
- Died: December 7, 2024 (aged 88)
- Party: Democratic
- Spouse: Jorea Marple
- Children: 4
- Education: West Virginia University (BA, JD)
- Profession: Lawyer

Darrell Vivian McGraw Jr. (November 8, 1936 – December 7, 2024) was an American lawyer and Democratic politician. He was the brother of former West Virginia State Supreme Court Justice and state Senate President Warren McGraw.

He was elected to the state supreme court for a single 12-year term in 1976. He was elected state attorney general in 1992 and re-elected in 1996, 2000, 2004, and 2008. He was the only person to have held both offices. He lost his re-election bid for a sixth term in 2012. He received 49% of the vote to Patrick Morrisey's 51%. He filed on January 30, 2016, as a candidate seeking election to the West Virginia state supreme court in 2016, but was defeated.

== Early life and education ==
McGraw was born in McGraws, West Virginia. He graduated from Pineville High School and served two years in the United States Army, stationed in Germany, before beginning his undergraduate career at West Virginia University, where he served as student body president and dedicated the mast of the U.S.S. West Virginia, which still stands as a landmark at the university.

After earning his Juris Doctor at West Virginia University, he began working under Governor Hulett C. Smith.

== Political career ==
Prior to acting in an official capacity within West Virginian politics, McGraw took a behind the scenes role, serving as counsel to Hulett C. Smith, Governor from 1965 to 1969, and the West Virginia Legislature. For twelve years starting in 1976, he was a state Supreme Court Justice. During his tenure, McGraw upheld the state Freedom of Information Act, ordering that any exemptions that were to be granted related to this legislation were to be extremely limited. In 1980, he officiated at the wedding of Larry Shannon Roberts, a former WCHS-TV weatherman, and Diana Rhodes Lovejoy, a former West Virginia State Tax Department employee. The wedding was held in the State Capitol Rotunda, the first known wedding to be held at this location.

In 1992, he was elected Attorney General. As Attorney General for the State of West Virginia, he was involved in many high-profile national cases, including the 1998 multibillion-dollar State Tobacco Settlement, which secured billions of dollars for the state of West Virginia. As a result of the settlement money, West Virginia saved $2.5 billion due to a bond sale that resulted from the settlement. His office also litigated refunds for over 1,200 state residents from DirecTV totaling $152,000.00.

In June 2001, McGraw was the first state attorney general to sue Purdue Pharma, the maker of Oxycodone. Just before trial in November 2004, Purdue's lawyer Eric Holder agreed to a settlement where Purdue would pay West Virginia $10 million for programs to discourage drug abuse. All the evidence under seal would remain confidential. The settlement did not require Purdue to admit any wrongdoing or change the way it told doctors to prescribe the drug.

== Criticism ==
While Attorney General, McGraw was criticized by some newspapers, state legislators, tort reform advocates, and the West Virginia Chamber of Commerce, who accused him of cronyism, benefiting trial lawyers who contributed to his political campaigns, and inappropriate use of public resources. The WV Record is a newspaper financially supported and published by the US Chamber of Commerce.

== Death ==
McGraw died of a heart attack on December 7, 2024, at the age of 88.

== Election results ==
Supreme Court

- 1976 – Elected
- 1988 – Defeated in primary
- 2016 – Defeated in non-partisan election with 22%

Attorney General

- 1996 – Elected
- 2000 – Reelected unopposed
- 2004 – Reelected with 50.4%
- 2008 – Reelected with 50.4%
- 2012 – Defeated receiving 49% of vote.

Party political offices
| Preceded by Mario Palumbo | Democratic nominee for West Virginia Attorney General; 1992, 1996, 2000, 2004, 2008, 2012 | Succeeded by Doug Reynolds |
Legal offices
| Preceded by Donald R. Wilson | Justice for the Supreme Court of Appeals of West Virginia; 1976–1988 | Succeeded by Margaret Workman |
| Preceded by Mario Palumbo | Attorney General of West Virginia; 1993–2012 | Succeeded by Patrick Morrisey |
