= Thomas S. Riley =

American lawyer, politician, and businessperson

Honorable Thomas S. Riley
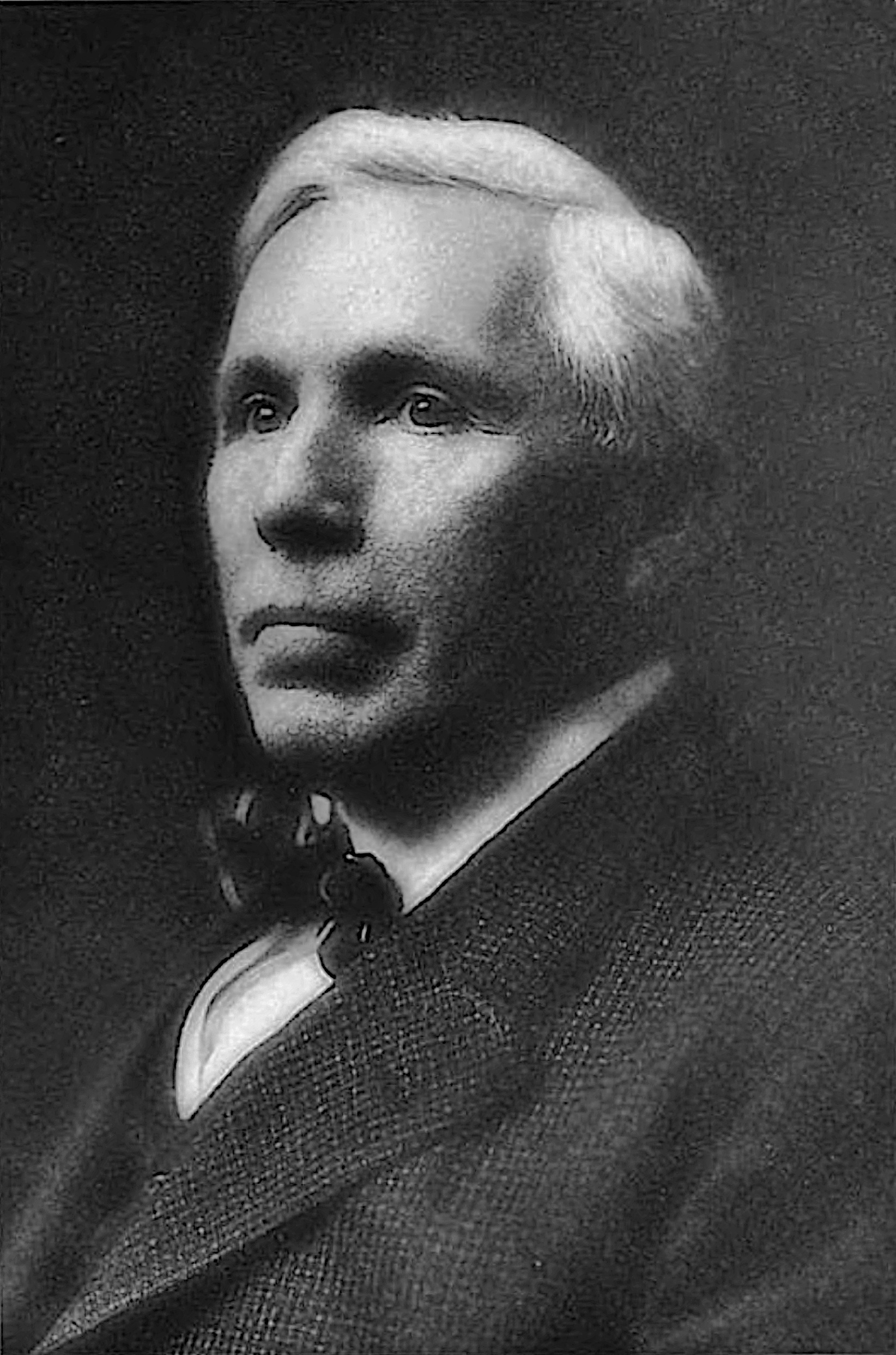
- Photograph portrait, published in 1919

11th Attorney General of West Virginia
- In office March 4, 1893 – March 3, 1897
- Governor: William A. MacCorkle
- Preceded by: Alfred Caldwell Jr.
- Succeeded by: Edgar P. Rucker

Personal details
- Born: January 8, 1852 Marshall County, Virginia (present-day West Virginia), U.S.
- Died: December 28, 1938 (aged 86) Wheeling, West Virginia, U.S.
- Resting place: Mount Calvary Cemetery, Wheeling, West Virginia, U.S.
- Party: Democratic
- Spouse: Catherine Philomenia "Minnie" Breinig
- Children: Thomas S. Riley; James B. Riley; Robert J. Riley
- Parent(s): Owen Riley (father); Mary Dailey Riley (mother)
- Education: Fairmont State Normal School; West Liberty State Normal School
- Profession: Lawyer, politician, and businessperson

Thomas Sylvester Riley (né Thomas Owen Riley; January 8, 1852 – December 28, 1938) was an American lawyer, politician, and businessperson who was based in West Virginia. Riley was the state's eleventh attorney general from March 4, 1893, until March 3, 1897.

Riley was born to Irish immigrant parents in Marshall County, which was then part of Virginia. He graduated from West Liberty State Normal School in 1877, and subsequently read law under Wheeling-based lawyer James Dallas Ewing, and was admitted to practice law in 1878. He formed a partnership with Ewing, which was later joined by West Virginia attorney general Thayer Melvin. In 1887, Riley was elected chairperson of the West Virginia Democratic Party State Executive Committee, serving until 1892.

From 1890 to 1892, Riley served on the Board of Regents for West Virginia State Normal Schools. He was elected Wheeling’s city solicitor in 1891 and the following year, he was elected West Virginia's attorney general. Riley unsuccessfully ran for election to represent West Virginia's 1st congressional district in the United States House of Representatives in 1906 and was appointed to the West Virginia School Book Commission in 1912. Riley continued to practice law until his death.

== Early life and education ==
Riley was born as Thomas Owen Riley on January 8, 1852, in Marshall County, which was then part of Virginia. His parents, Owen Riley and Mary Dailey Riley, were born in Ireland and emigrated to the United States. Riley spent his early life on a farm and was educated in the local public schools, where he taught after graduation. He commenced his post-secondary education at Fairmont State Normal School in 1875, then attended West Liberty State Normal School from 1876 until graduation in 1877. In July 1877, Riley began reading law in the law office of Wheeling-based lawyer James Dallas Ewing.

== Law career ==
Riley was admitted to practice law on October 26, 1878, and he formed a law partnership with Ewing. In 1881, Riley's and Ewing's firm was joined by West Virginia attorney general Thayer Melvin following Melvin’s resignation as Judge of the First Judicial District. The firm became known as Ewing, Melvin, and Riley, and continued thus until Riley’s departure in 1894. In October 1890, Riley was admitted to practice at the Supreme Court of the United States. In April 1898, Riley was elected a director of the Consolidated Building Loan and Trust Company, and was selected as the company’s attorney.

== Political career ==
In November 1887, Riley was elected to the West Virginia Democratic Party State Executive Committee to fill a vacancy caused by the resignation of Joseph S. Miller, Commissioner of Internal Revenue. Riley was elected Chairperson of the Democratic Party State Executive Committee in 1887, where he served until 1892. West Virginia Governor Aretas B. Fleming appointed Riley a member of the Board of Regents for West Virginia State Normal Schools, representing West Virginia's 1st congressional district, where he served from 1890 to 1892. In February 1891, Riley was elected as Wheeling's city solicitor, serving for two years.

As the Democratic Party State Committee Chairperson, Riley convened the West Virginia State Democratic Convention at Parkersburg in July 1892. At the convention, Riley won the Democratic nomination for attorney general of West Virginia, which he contested against B. F. Kidd. In November 1892, Riley was elected the state’s eleventh attorney general. He was attorney general in the state's eleventh administration under Governor William A. MacCorkle from March 4, 1893, to March 3, 1897. In August 1896, at the West Virginia State Democratic Convention in Wheeling, Riley was renominated as the Democratic candidate for state attorney general. The convention band played The Wearing of the Green in Riley's honor as he gave his acceptance speech. In November 1896, Riley lost the position to Republican Edgar P. Rucker.

At the April 1904 West Virginia State Democratic Convention in Charleston, Riley was a candidate for a state delegate-at-large at the 1904 Democratic National Convention in St. Louis. Riley supported Richard Olney for the Democratic presidential nomination. In 1906, Riley was the Democratic candidate to represent West Virginia's 1st congressional district in the U.S. House of Representatives, which he lost to Republican William Pallister Hubbard.

In February 1912, Governor William E. Glasscock appointed Riley a member of the West Virginia School Book Commission, which was created under a 1909 act of the West Virginia Legislature to contract for uniform textbooks for the state’s public schools. In 1913, Riley was rumored as a candidate for United States Attorney in the Northern District of West Virginia after several of his friends from Wheeling visited Washington, D.C., to advocate for his selection in opposition to the appointment of Stuart W. Walker.

== Personal life ==
=== Marriage and children ===
Riley married Catherine Philomenia "Minnie" Breinig of Wheeling, daughter of Michael and Elizabeth Breinig, on November 11, 1891, at the Cathedral of Saint Joseph. Riley and Breinig were married by Roman Catholic Bishop of Wheeling John Joseph Kain. They had three children together: Thomas S. Riley, Supreme Court of Appeals of West Virginia justice James B. Riley, and lawyer Robert J. Riley.

=== Organizational memberships ===
Riley was a member of the Carroll Club, the Benevolent and Protective Order of Elks, the Fort Henry Club, and the Wheeling Country Club. He was an active member of the Ohio County Bar Association and the West Virginia Bar Association, and attended the associations' annual sessions. In 1920, the West Virginia Bar Association selected Riley as a delegate to the American Bar Association convention in St. Louis. From 1924 to 1925, he served as the chairperson of the West Virginia Bar Association's Committee on Uniform State Law.

Riley served as a director of both St. Vincent’s Home for Girls and St. John’s Home for Boys in Elm Grove. Riley was also a member and president of the local Catholic organization, Knights of St. George of Wheeling.

== Later life and death ==
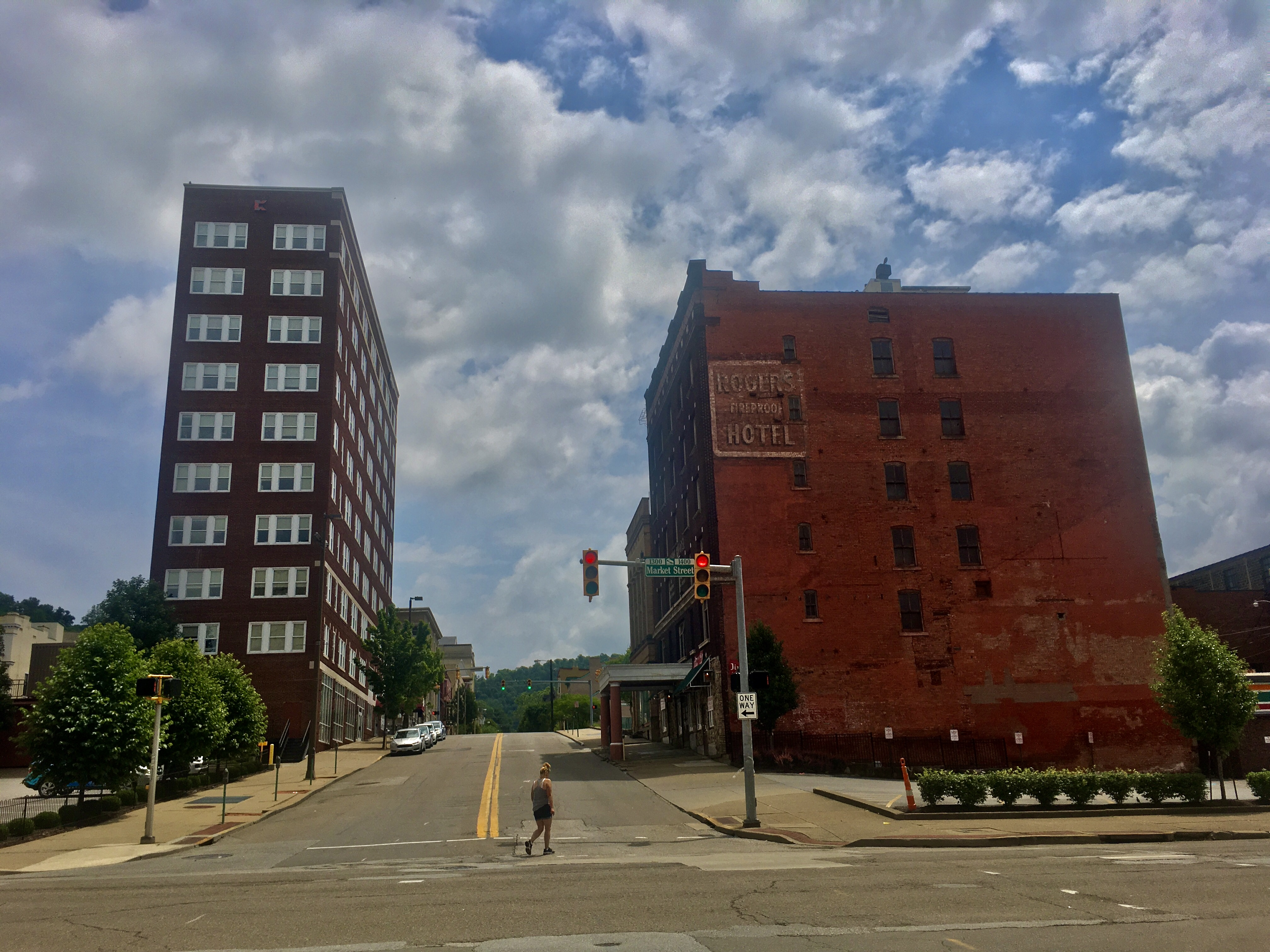
Riley Law Building, pictured on left

Riley served as the attorney for Bishop of Wheeling Patrick James Donahue until the bishop's death in 1922, and as the attorney for Donahue’s successor Bishop John Joseph Swint until Riley’s death in 1938. In 1907, Bishop Donahue made Riley trustee of his estate, which included 66 sections of West Texas oil lands. In 1922, Riley commissioned the building of the Riley Law Building at the corner of 14th and Chapline Streets in Wheeling.

Riley continued to practice law until January 1938. After suffering a long illness, he died at 4:30 p.m. on December 28, 1938, at his residence at 10 Park Row, Wheeling, in Ohio County's Triadelphia district. At the time of his death, Riley suffered from diabetes mellitus, chronic nephritis, chronic myocarditis, and dementia. He was interred at Wheeling's Mount Calvary Cemetery on December 31, 1938. One of his sons, James B. Riley, served for over 20 years as a Justice of the Supreme Court of Appeals of West Virginia.

== Legacy ==
In his 1919 book Bench and Bar of West Virginia, West Virginia Governor George W. Atkinson described Riley as "a close student, a hard worker", and "remarkably successful in the practice of his profession". Following his death in 1938, the Associated Press described Riley as the "last member of the State's 'Old Guard' Democrats who held sway in the decade before the turn of the century", and stated he had "guided the destiny" of West Virginia for half a century, along with Fleming, U.S. Senator John E. Kenna, John T. McGraw, William A. Ohley, and J. W. Sinclair.

== Bibliography ==
- Atkinson, George Wesley, ed. (1919). Bench and Bar of West Virginia. Charleston, West Virginia: Virginian Law Book Company. OCLC 8899470 – via Internet Archive.
- Brant & Fuller (1890). History of the Upper Ohio Valley: With Family History and Biographical Sketches, A Statement of Its Resources, Industrial Growth and Commercial Advantages. Vol. I. Madison, Wisconsin: Brant & Fuller. OCLC 579049189 – via Internet Archive.
- Callahan, James Morton (1913). Semi-Centennial History of West Virginia. Charleston, West Virginia: Semi-Centennial Commission of West Virginia. OCLC 749199411 – via Internet Archive.
- Dennis, Albert N., ed. (1920). Greater Wheeling West Virginia and Vicinity. Wheeling, West Virginia: Progressive Publishers, Inc. OCLC 1045613588 – via Internet Archive.
- Fairmont State Normal School (1891). Catalogue and Alumni Record of the Twenty Second Annual Session of the Fairmont Branch of the West Virginia State Normal School at Fairmont, Marion Co. 1890–91. Charleston, West Virginia: Moses W. Donnally, Public Printer. OCLC 61330120 – via Internet Archive.
- Fairmont State Normal School (1892). Twenty-Third Annual Catalogue and Circular of the Fairmont State Normal School, at Fairmont, Marion County, W. Va. for the School Year Ending June 16, 1892. Charleston, West Virginia: Moses W. Donnally, Public Printer. OCLC 61330120 – via Internet Archive.
- Halford, A. J., ed. (1909). "Official Congressional Directory: 60th Congress – 2d Session". Official Congressional Directory (2nd ed.). Washington, D.C.: United States Government Printing Office. ISSN 0160-9890. OCLC 1000123805. Archived from the original on October 27, 2020 – via Google Books.
- Harris, John T., ed. (1916). West Virginia Legislative Hand Book and Manual and Official Register. Charleston, West Virginia: The Tribune Printing Company. OCLC 643874972 – via Internet Archive.
- Lewis, Virgil A. (1904). History and Government of West Virginia. New York: American Book Company. OCLC 903925233 – via Internet Archive.
- Lewis, Virgil A. (1906). Second Biennial Report of the Department of Archives and History of the State of West Virginia. Charleston, West Virginia: West Virginia Department of Archives and History. OCLC 1194337106 – via Internet Archive.
- West Virginia Bar Association (1907). Proceedings of the Twenty-Second Annual Meeting of the West Virginia Bar Association Held at Elkins, West Virginia on December 27th and 28th, 1906. Vol. 23. Parkersburg, West Virginia: Press of the Elletson-Carver Company. OCLC 11874180. Archived from the original on May 3, 2016 – via Google Books.
- West Virginia Bar Association. "West Virginia Bar Association Officers 1924–1925" (April 1925). West Virginia University College of Law. Morgantown, West Virginia: The Research Repository @ WVU, West Virginia University.

Legal offices
Preceded by Alfred Caldwell Jr.	Attorney General of West Virginia; March 4, 1893 – March 3, 1897	Succeeded by Edgar P. Rucker
