= Charlie Brown (West Virginia politician) =

American lawyer and politician (born 1950)

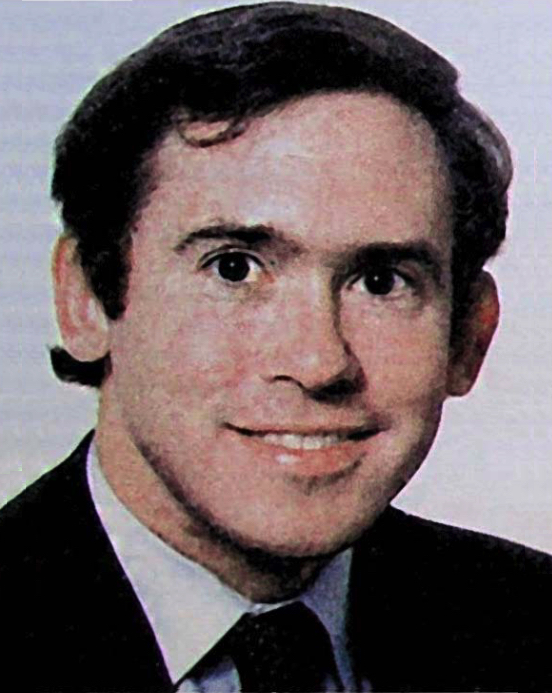
- Official portrait, 1985

30th Attorney General of West Virginia
- In office January 14, 1985 – August 21, 1989
- Governor: Arch A. Moore Jr.; Gaston Caperton
- Preceded by: Chauncey H. Browning Jr.
- Succeeded by: Roger W. Tompkins II

Personal details
- Born: Charles Gailey Brown III; June 6, 1950 (age 76) Mansfield, Ohio, U.S.
- Party: Democratic
- Spouses: Alice Sue Hypes (m. 1981, divorced); Margery Anne Swanson (m. 1997)
- Relatives: Sherrod Brown (brother)
- Education: Denison University (BA); Yale University (JD)
- Occupation: Lawyer; politician; author

Charles Gailey Brown III (born June 6, 1950) is an American lawyer and politician who served as Attorney General of West Virginia. First elected in 1984 and reelected in 1988, he resigned in 1989 in exchange for an end to a grand jury investigation into allegations that he lied under oath and into his campaign financial records. He is the older brother of the U.S. senator from Ohio Sherrod Brown.

== Early life and education ==
Brown was born on June 6, 1950 in Mansfield, Ohio, to Dr. Charles G. Brown and Emily Campbell Brown. He was an eagle scout, and graduated from Mansfield Senior High School. He then received his Bachelor of Arts from Denison University, participating in Phi Beta Kappa. Brown then went on to receive his J.D. degree from Yale Law School.

Party political offices
Preceded by Chauncey H. Browning Jr.	Democratic nominee for West Virginia Attorney General; 1984, 1988	Succeeded by Mario Palumbo
Political offices
Preceded by Chauncey H. Browning Jr.	Attorney General of West Virginia; 1985–1989	Succeeded by Roger W. Tompkins II
