= Thayer Melvin =

American lawyer, politician, and judge

Honorable Thayer Melvin
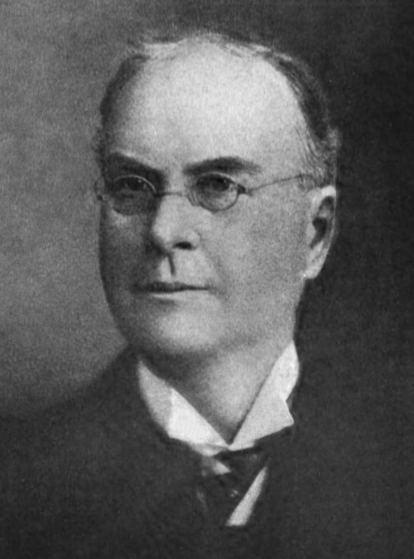
- Photographic portrait of Thayer Melvin in his later years.

4th Attorney General of West Virginia
- In office January 1, 1867 – July 1, 1869
- Governor: Arthur I. Boreman
- Preceded by: Edwin Maxwell
- Succeeded by: Aquilla B. Caldwell

Circuit Judge for the First Judicial District
- In office June 26, 1869 – November 19, 1881
- Preceded by: Elbert H. Caldwell
- Succeeded by: John Jeremiah Jacob
- In office 1899 – November 9, 1906
- Preceded by: Joseph R. Paull
- Succeeded by: Frank W. Nesbitt

Personal details
- Born: November 15, 1835 Fairview, Brooke County, Virginia (now known as New Manchester in Hancock County, West Virginia)
- Died: November 9, 1906 (aged 70) Wheeling City Hospital, Ward 5, Wheeling, West Virginia
- Resting place: United Methodist Cemetery, New Manchester, West Virginia
- Party: Whig Party (pre-Civil War); Republican Party (post-Civil War)
- Parent(s): James Melvin (father); Philenia Thayer Melvin (mother)
- Profession: lawyer, politician, and judge
- Awards: Brevet

Military service
- Allegiance: Union
- Branch/service: United States Army; Union Army
- Years of service: 1861–1865
- Rank: Captain; Adjutant General of the Department of West Virginia; Brevet Colonel
- Unit: Company F, 1st West Virginia Volunteer Infantry Regiment; Department of West Virginia
- Battles/wars: American Civil War

Thayer Melvin (November 15, 1835 – November 9, 1906) was an American lawyer, politician, and judge in the U.S. state of West Virginia. Melvin served as the fourth Attorney General of West Virginia from January 1, 1867, until July 1, 1869, and twice served as the presiding circuit judge of West Virginia's First Judicial District in the state's Northern Panhandle (1869–1881 and 1899–1906).

Melvin was born in 1835 in present-day New Manchester, West Virginia. He was educated in local common schools and began studying law at the age of 17. In 1853, at the age of 18, Melvin became a member of the Hancock County bar. By the age of 20 he was elected as the Hancock County Commonwealth's attorney, a post to which he was twice reelected in 1856 and 1860.

In May 1861, Melvin served as a delegate to the First Wheeling Convention. At the start of the American Civil War, Melvin enlisted as a private in Company F of the 1st West Virginia Volunteer Infantry Regiment of the Union Army. In August of that year, he organized a company of men in Hancock County. Melvin was later commissioned as Adjutant general of Volunteers on the staff of Brigadier General Benjamin Franklin Kelley in the Department of West Virginia. On February 21, 1865, Melvin was captured in Cumberland, Maryland, along with General Kelley and Major General George Crook, by the Confederate partisans, McNeill's Rangers. Melvin, Kelley, and Crook were taken to Richmond where they were exchanged for Confederate general Isaac R. Trimble.

In 1865, Melvin was elected prosecuting attorney of Hardy County and was elected as the prosecuting attorney for Hancock County the following year. He was elected West Virginia's Attorney General in 1866 and served in the post until 1869 when he was appointed to the circuit judgeship of West Virginia's First Judicial District. Melvin was twice reelected to his circuit judge position, resigning in 1881 to practice law in Wheeling. In 1899, Melvin was reappointed to his First Judicial District circuit judge seat and served on the bench until his death from a stroke in 1906.

== Early life and education ==
Thayer Melvin was born on November 15, 1835, in Fairview, Virginia. (Note: Melvin's hometown of Fairview later became part of Hancock County in 1847 and West Virginia in 1863. Fairview was originally known as New Manchester, then known as Fairview and Pughtown, and was renamed New Manchester, which it remains at the present day.) The eldest of five children, he was the son of James Melvin and his wife Philenia Thayer Melvin. Melvin's father James, of Irish descent, was from Pennsylvania.

Melvin received his early education in the common primary and secondary schools in Hancock and other neighboring counties. He commenced his studies in jurisprudence at the age of 17 in New Manchester, which was then the county seat of Hancock, and received his law books and instruction from the town's lawyers. Melvin then relocated to New Lisbon, Ohio, for a year to further his law studies under the instruction of a friend. In 1853, at the age of 18, he passed his bar examination and was admitted to the bar of Hancock County. Melvin then practiced law in association with O. W. Langfitt in New Manchester.

== Early law career ==
In 1855, Melvin was elected as the Commonwealth's attorney of Hancock County, despite the fact that he was under the required minimum age of 21 to hold public office. He was twice reelected for full terms to the position in 1856 and 1860. Melvin continued to serve as Hancock County's prosecuting attorney notwithstanding his relocation to Wheeling in 1857. Following his move to Wheeling, he established a law practice known as Pendleton & Melvin with Joseph H. Pendleton, who was one of the city's preeminent lawyers. During this period, Melvin was affiliated with the Whig Party.

== American Civil War ==
In May 1861, Melvin served as a delegate from Hancock County to the First Wheeling Convention. Following the onset of the American Civil War, he volunteered as a private in Company F of the 1st West Virginia Volunteer Infantry Regiment of the Union Army. Melvin served first as an orderly sergeant and then as a first lieutenant of his company. In August 1861, he organized a company for state service with its headquarters in his hometown of Fairview. By April 1862, while still a lieutenant, Melvin had received a commission as Adjutant general of Volunteers on the staff of Brigadier General Benjamin Franklin Kelley in the Department of West Virginia.

On August 12, 1863, in his role as adjutant general, Melvin delivered orders to Major General William W. Averell for the procurement of the law books of the Library of the Supreme Court of Virginia in Lewisburg and to place officers in charge of them for their transport to safekeeping in Beverly. Because the library had been purchased for the western part of Virginia, Kelley averred that the library "rightfully belongs to the new State of West Virginia. Our judges need it very much". Melvin then served on the staff of General Philip Sheridan during the Shenandoah Valley Campaigns of 1864.

As the adjutant general for the Department of West Virginia, Melvin served under the department's succeeding commanding officers: Brigadier General Kelley, Major General Franz Sigel, Major General David Hunter, Major General George Crook, and Major General William H. Emory.

Melvin served as an adjutant and chief of staff to Kelley while he was in command of the garrison guarding the Baltimore and Ohio Railroad in Cumberland, Maryland, which was then the headquarters of the Department of West Virginia military district. By this time, he was serving with the military rank of Captain. In the early morning of February 21, 1865, the Confederate partisans known as McNeill's Rangers sent two detachments behind enemy lines to capture Kelley and his superior Major General Crook from their hotels in Cumberland. One of the two detachments was sent to the Barnum House hotel, where Melvin and Kelley were staying. Other sources claim the two were staying at the St. Nicholas Hotel, where William McKinley had been lodged.

At their hotel, McNeill's Rangers private Sprigg Lynn was directed to Melvin's room first, and then to Kelley's. The men were forced to dress at gunpoint and were taken captive along with Crook, who had been staying at the Revere House hotel. Melvin, Kelley, and Crook were sent to Libby Prison in Richmond, and were exchanged for Confederate general Isaac R. Trimble and a guarantee from General Ulysses S. Grant that the treatment of captured McNeill's Rangers imprisoned at Fort McHenry would be improved. An article published in Richmond's Enquirer newspaper claimed that Melvin had been caught in bed with "a blushing bride" by McNeill's men during his capture; however, Wheeling's Daily Intelligencer newspaper reminded its readers that the story was baseless, as Melvin was unmarried.

Following his release, Melvin served as an adjutant until the end of the war in 1865. That year, he was honorably discharged as a brevet colonel from the Union Army in recognition of his meritorious services in the line of duty.

== Political and judicial careers ==
In the fall of 1865, Melvin was elected prosecuting attorney of Hardy County in the Potomac Highlands of West Virginia. In 1866 he relocated to Wellsburg in Brooke County where he resumed the practice of law. He became a Republican following the war and remained affiliated with the party until his death although he was never a strong partisan. In 1866, he was again elected as the prosecuting attorney for Hancock County, despite residing in Brooke County.

In 1866, Melvin was nominated as the Republican candidate for Attorney General of West Virginia, and he won his election to the position with 23,509 votes, receiving the highest number of votes cast for an attorney in West Virginia's brief three-year history. On January 1, 1867, Melvin began his one-year tenure as attorney general; he was renominated on June 4, 1868, at the West Virginia Republican Convention and reelected to the position in fall 1868. He served in the office until his resignation on July 1, 1869. Melvin resigned his post as attorney general to accept an appointment to a circuit judgeship of the First Judicial District of West Virginia which comprised Brooke, Hancock, Marshall, and Ohio counties. He had been appointed to the judgeship by West Virginia Governor William E. Stevenson to fill the vacancy caused by the death of Elbert H. Caldwell.

While serving as a circuit judge, Melvin was appointed by the governor to assist in completing the codification of West Virginia state laws. Following a dispute between Charles Town and Shepherdstown over the location of Jefferson County's court, he was selected to serve as the circuit court judge in Charles Town for the fall term, which began on September 12, 1872. On August 24, 1872, Melvin was elected for a full eight-year term as judge of the First Judicial District, which began on January 1, 1873.

In 1873, Melvin refused to transfer the case of Taylor Strauder, a black man, to a federal court following his indictment by an all-white Ohio County grand jury for the murder of his wife. Strauder and his lawyers argued that he would not receive equal treatment in the West Virginia courts due to its all-white jury law and cited the Civil Rights Act of 1866 for a transfer to a federal court. Following Melvin's ruling, Strauder's murder trial proceeded in the Ohio County court in May 1873, and he was inevitably convicted by an all-white jury. Strauder appealed his conviction to the Supreme Court of Appeals of West Virginia and finally to the Supreme Court of the United States, where his case Strauder v. West Virginia 100 U.S. 303 (1879) was decided on March 1, 1880. The Supreme Court held that categorical exclusion of blacks from juries for no other reason than their race violated the Equal Protection Clause, and Strauder's conviction was overturned due to the Ohio County court's violation of United States constitutional criminal procedure.

On October 12, 1880, Melvin was reelected with 7,730 votes alongside a second judge to serve the First Judicial District, and he commenced his new term on January 1, 1881. He resigned his circuit judgeship on November 19, 1881, after tiring of the "wool sack", which is what he called his judicial court dress. Former West Virginia Governor John Jeremiah Jacob was appointed by Governor Jacob B. Jackson to fill the remainder of Melvin's unexpired term.

Melvin resumed the practice of law in Wheeling. In 1881, he joined the law practice of J. Dallas Ewing and Thomas S. Riley under the name of Ewing, Melvin & Riley. The law firm became one of the strongest in the Northern Panhandle of West Virginia. In 1898, Melvin and his law partner, Riley, argued on behalf of the West Virginia Board of Public Works before the U.S. Supreme Court in the case, Pittsburgh &c. Ry. v. Board of Public Works of West Virginia 172 U.S. 32 (1898), in which the Pittsburgh, Cincinnati, Chicago and St. Louis Railroad sought to avoid paying taxes on its usage of the West Virginia section of a railroad bridge crossing the Ohio River between Steubenville and Wheeling Junction. The court's decision upheld the law in the Code of West Virginia of 1891, c. 29, § 67, that taxed railroad bridges. The court's decision stated: "A railroad bridge across a navigable river forming the boundary line between two states is not, by reason of being an instrument of interstate commerce, exempt from taxation by either state upon the part within it."

Following the death of Judge Joseph R. Paull in 1899, Melvin was appointed by Governor George W. Atkinson to fill the unexpired term of Paull's judicial seat with the unanimous urging of members of the judicial district's bar.

On June 3, 1900, Melvin granted an injunction that prevented the Wheeling Stogies baseball team from playing Sunday games in Wheeling. The Stogies had begun holding Sunday games to increase attendance, but received warrants sworn by Wheeling Island residents and a fine on April 29, 1900, during their first Sunday game on the island. The Stogies continued to play Sunday games, claiming them to be for charity's sake; however, the team's players were again fined by Judge J. R. LaRue. A local federation of churches and other people opposed to Sunday baseball games applied to Melvin and the circuit court for an injunction to restrict the Stogies and other baseball clubs from playing on Sunday because it was a "public nuisance". His injunction, the violation of which was a fine of $2,000, followed. The team's lawyers argued that Sunday games met the recreational needs of working-class people, but Melvin and the court did not buy the argument, and Sunday baseball games did not become prevalent in West Virginia for another two decades.

Melvin served the remainder of Paull's unexpired term, and was nominated by both Democratic and Republican parties and reelected for another eight-year term without opposition in November 1900.

== Later life and death ==
Melvin served out his term until October 31, 1906, when he suffered a stroke while holding a session of the circuit court in Wellsburg. He was paralyzed and lost consciousness as a result of the stroke, and was assisted from the bench and taken to Wheeling City Hospital in Ward 5. By the following day physicians had given up hope for his recovery. Melvin died at 16:00 on November 9, 1906, at the hospital as a result of apoplexy. His body was taken to the McLure Hotel on November 10, where it lay in state until November 12. Melvin was interred next to his father and mother in his family's graveyard at United Methodist Cemetery in his hometown of Fairview (present-day New Manchester) in Hancock County.

Melvin's estate was valued at $30,000. His heirs included his sister, Mrs. S. T. Moore of Fairview, his nephews James and Paul Melvin of Fairview, his nephew John Melvin of New Cumberland, and his niece Mrs. John Bendene of Steubenville. While not an heir, Melvin was also survived by his brother, J. A. B. Melvin, who was president of the Altoona Trust Company.

Following his death, lawyer Frank W. Nesbitt was appointed by Governor William M. O. Dawson to fulfill his unexpired term on the circuit court bench.

== Legacy ==
Following his death, Melvin was memorialized by the West Virginia Bar Association at its annual meeting in December 1906. The association averred, "Judge Melvin's name and character, both as a Judge and as a man, was not only well known and recognized in the Circuit in which he so long occupied the Bench, but known and honored throughout the entire state of West Virginia." In his Bench and Bar of West Virginia (1919), former Governor George W. Atkinson remarked of Melvin's judicial career: "He sought only to be just and fair, and rarely if ever, failed in deciding right. It was a rare occurrence for one of his decisions to be reversed by the Appellate Court. Furthermore he was one of the most courteous, urbane of men, and was at all times absolutely honest and sincere."

== Personal life and activities ==
Melvin never married. He was a member of the Wheeling Shakespeare Club and was active in several Union veterans' organizations and reunions. In October 1871, Melvin delivered an address to welcome the soldiers and attendees of the Army of West Virginia Soldiers' Reunion in Wheeling. He was later a member of the Society of the Army of West Virginia, later known as the Army of West Virginia Association. In 1883, and again on September 9, 1897, Melvin was elected a vice president of the organization. Melvin was also a member of the 1st West Virginia Association, of which he was elected president on September 6, 1894. In addition, Melvin belonged to the Holliday Post of the Grand Army of the Republic and participated in the decoration of local Union graves on Memorial Day in 1897, 1898, and 1899.

== Bibliography ==
- Akin, William E. (2006). West Virginia Baseball: A History, 1865–2000. Jefferson, North Carolina: McFarland & Company. ISBN 978-0-7864-2570-9. OCLC 68693729. Archived from the original on November 23, 2015.
- Armstrong, William Howard (2000). Major McKinley: William McKinley and the Civil War. Kent, Ohio: Kent State University Press. ISBN 978-0-87338-657-9. OCLC 42421054.
- Atkinson, George Wesley (1919). Bench and Bar of West Virginia. Charleston, West Virginia: Virginia Law Book Company. OCLC 8899470.
- Atkinson, George Wesley; Gibbens, Alvaro Franklin (1890). Prominent Men of West Virginia: Biographical Sketches of Representative Men in Every Honorable Vocation, Including Politics, the Law, Theology, Medicine, Education, Finance, Journalism, Trade, Commerce and Agriculture. Wheeling, West Virginia: W. L. Callin. OCLC 3886825.
- Brant & Fuller (1890). History of the Upper Ohio Valley: With Family History and Biographical Sketches, A Statement of Its Resources, Industrial Growth and Commercial Advantages, Volume I. Madison, Wisconsin: Brant & Fuller. OCLC 579049189. Archived from the original on April 27, 2016.
- Bushong, Millard Kessler (2009). A History of Jefferson County, West Virginia 1719–1940. Bowie, Maryland: Heritage Books. ISBN 978-0-7884-2250-8. OCLC 51325539. Archived from the original on November 10, 2015.
- Casler, John Overton (2005). Four Years in the Stonewall Brigade. Columbia, South Carolina: University of South Carolina Press. ISBN 978-1-57003-595-1. OCLC 59402115. Archived from the original on November 21, 2015.
- Dayton, Ruth Woods (2009). Greenbrier Pioneers and Their Homes. Baltimore, Maryland: Genealogical Publishing Company. ISBN 978-0-8063-4668-7. OCLC 37047153. Archived from the original on November 15, 2015.
- Hall, Granville Davisson (2000). The Rending of Virginia: A History. Knoxville, Tennessee: University of Tennessee Press. ISBN 978-1-57233-070-2. OCLC 44426669. Archived from the original on April 25, 2016.
- Jefferson County Historical Society (December 1996). Roger J. Perry (ed.). Magazine of the Jefferson County Historical Society. Vol. LXII. Charles Town, West Virginia: Jefferson County Historical Society. ISBN 978-1-57233-070-2. OCLC 44426669. Archived from the original on November 3, 2015.
- Magid, Paul (2013). George Crook: From the Redwoods to Appomattox. Norman, Oklahoma: University of Oklahoma Press. ISBN 978-0-8061-5011-6. OCLC 706677633. Archived from the original on November 8, 2015.
- McDonald, William N. (2002). Bushrod Corbin Washington (ed.). A History of the Laurel Brigade. Baltimore, Maryland: Johns Hopkins University Press. ISBN 978-0-8018-6952-5. OCLC 48469099. Archived from the original on November 27, 2015.
- Newton, J. H.; Nichols, G. G.; Sprankle, A. G. (1879). J. H. Newton (ed.). History of the Pan-Handle: Being Historical Collections of the Counties of Ohio, Brooke, Marshall and Hancock, West Virginia. Wheeling, West Virginia: J. A. Caldwell. ISBN 978-1-55613-413-5. Archived from the original on November 12, 2015.
- Robinson, Charles M. (2001). General Crook and the Western Frontier. Norman, Oklahoma: University of Oklahoma Press. ISBN 978-0-8061-3358-4. OCLC 46882538.
- Scharf, John Thomas (2003). History of Western Maryland: Being a History of Frederick, Montgomery, Carroll, Washington, Allegany, and Garrett Counties from the Earliest Period to the Present Day, Including Biographical Sketches of Their Representative Men, Volume 1. Baltimore, Maryland: Genealogical Publishing Company. ISBN 978-0-8063-4565-9. OCLC 32914136. Archived from the original on June 22, 2015.
- Waldrep, Christopher (2011). Jury Discrimination: The Supreme Court, Public Opinion, and a Grassroots Fight for Racial Equality in Mississippi. Athens, Georgia: University of Georgia Press. ISBN 978-0-8203-4030-2. OCLC 468232569. Archived from the original on May 17, 2016.
- West Virginia Bar Association (1907). Proceedings of the Twenty-Second Annual Meeting of the West Virginia Bar Association Held at Elkins, West Virginia on December 27th and 28th, 1906. Parkersburg, West Virginia: Press of the Elletson-Carver Company. OCLC 11874180. Archived from the original on May 3, 2016.

Legal offices
Preceded by Edwin Maxwell	Attorney General of West Virginia; January 1, 1867 – July 1, 1869	Succeeded by Aquilla B. Caldwell
Preceded by Elbert H. Caldwell	Circuit Judge for the First Judicial District of West Virginia; June 26, 1869 – November 19, 1881	Succeeded by John Jeremiah Jacob
Preceded by Joseph R. Paull	Circuit Judge for the First Judicial District of West Virginia; 1899 – November 9, 1906	Succeeded by Frank W. Nesbitt
