= List of West Virginia attorneys general =

Attorney General of West Virginia
- The Great Seal of the State of West Virginia

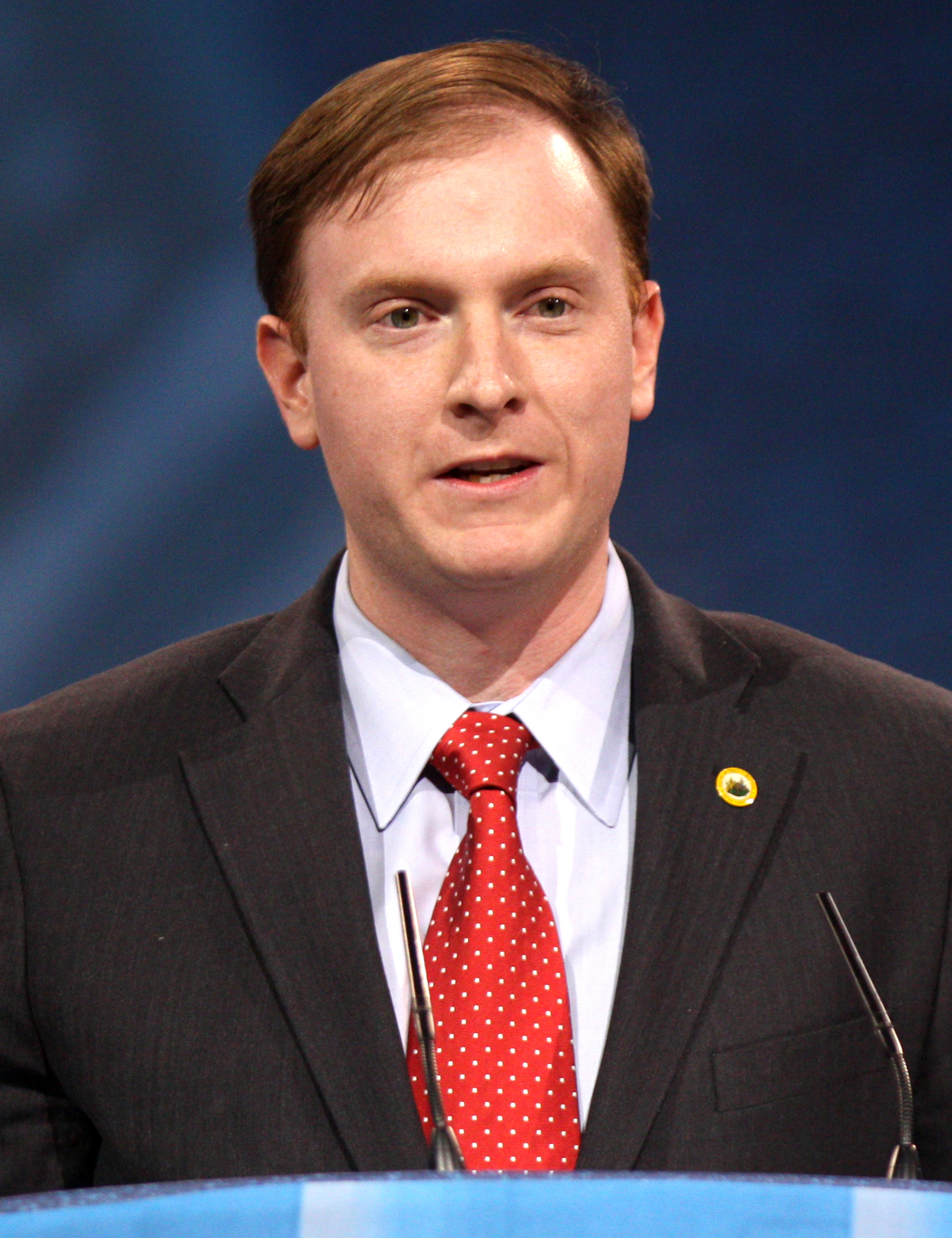
- Incumbent; JB McCuskey since January 13, 2025
- Style: The Honorable
- Seat: Building 1, Room E-26; West Virginia Capitol Complex; Charleston, West Virginia
- Term length: Four years, no term limit
- Inaugural holder: Aquilla B. Caldwell
- Formation: June 20, 1863
- Salary: $95,000 per year (2012)
- Website: www.ago.wv.gov

The attorney general of West Virginia is the chief legal advisor to the West Virginia state government and is the state's chief law enforcement officer. The office was created by Article VII, Section 1 of the first Constitution of West Virginia in 1863. Under the current state constitution (1872), the attorney general is an executive department-level state constitutional officer, along with the governor, secretary of state, auditor, treasurer, and commissioner of agriculture. The attorney general is the ex officio reporter of the Supreme Court of Appeals of West Virginia. The constitution further specifies that the attorney general shall reside in the seat of state government, Charleston, during their term of office. In Charleston, they are to maintain public records, books, and papers pertaining to their office, and perform all duties prescribed by state law. As of 2012, the attorney general receives a salary of $95,000 per year.

The attorney general gives their written opinions and advice upon questions of law to state officials, heads of state institutions, and prosecuting attorneys. They are also responsible for all litigation on behalf of the state government and state agencies and departments. The attorney general represents the state in all claims processed by the United States Court of Claims, prosecutes civil actions as prescribed by law, enforces the state consumer, antitrust, and preneed burial statutes, and enforces the West Virginia Human Rights Act and the West Virginia Fair Housing Act. The attorney general is also an ex officio member of the Board of Public Works, Council of Finance and Administration, Public Land Corporation, West Virginia Housing Fund, West Virginia Sheriff's Bureau, Department of Public Safety Retirement Board, Bid Suspension Review Board, State Building Commission, Commission on Charitable Contributions, Women's Commission, Multistate Tax Compact Advisory Committee, Records Management, and Preservation Advisory Committee.

To be eligible for election or appointment to the position, the attorney general candidate must be at least 25 years of age at the beginning of their term of service, and must have been a citizen of West Virginia for at least five years prior to their election or appointment. In 1872, when the second (and current) Constitution of West Virginia was enacted, the constitution averred that citizens residing in the state at the time of its enactment were also authorized to be elected or appointed as attorney general, regardless of the length of the residency in West Virginia. Their election can be held at any time as prescribed by law. The attorney general's term of office is four years and commences on the first Monday after the second Wednesday of the month of January following their election. If the office of attorney general should become vacant on account of death, resignation, or otherwise, the governor is authorized to select an appointee to hold that office until a successor can be elected and qualified.

Since West Virginia became a state on June 20, 1863, it has had 34 attorneys general, of whom 33 men have held the office (the inaugural attorney general, Aquilla B. Caldwell of Ohio County, served two nonconsecutive terms). Caldwell was the first Republican to hold the office, and Joseph Sprigg of Hampshire County was the first Democrat. Darrell McGraw, who held the position from 1993 to 2013, is the longest-serving attorney general and served the most consecutive terms, being elected to the office five times. The current attorney general, JB McCuskey, began his term on January 13, 2025. Seven attorneys general have served as Governor of West Virginia.

== List of attorneys general ==
No.	Attorney General	Term (Note: From 1865 until 1873, attorneys general were sworn into office on January 1; and from 1877 until 1933, they were sworn into office on March 4. From 1937 until the present, attorney general terms begin on the first Monday after the second Wednesday of the month of January following their election.)		Party		County of residence	
No.	Attorney General	Start	End	Party		County of residence	
1	Aquilla B. Caldwell (Note: Aquilla B. Caldwell was elected attorney general on May 28, 1863, but did not take office until statehood on June 20, 1863.)	June 20, 1863	End	December 31, 1864		Republican	Ohio
2	Ephraim B. Hall	January 1, 1865	December 31, 1865		Republican	Marion	
3	Edwin Maxwell (Note: Edwin Maxwell was appointed to fill the vacancy caused by the resignation of Ephraim B. Hall on December 31, 1865 and served in the position until December 31, 1866.)	January 1, 1866	December 31, 1866		Republican	Harrison	
4	Thayer Melvin	January 1, 1867	July 1, 1869		Republican	Ohio	
5	Aquilla B. Caldwell (Note: Aquilla B. Caldwell was appointed to fill the vacancy caused by the resignation of Thayer Melvin on July 1, 1869.)	July 2, 1869	December 31, 1870		Republican	Ohio	
6	Joseph Sprigg	January 1, 1871	December 31, 1872		Democratic	Hampshire	
7	Henry M. Mathews	January 1, 1873	March 3, 1877		Democratic	Greenbrier	
8	Robert White	March 4, 1877	March 3, 1881		Democratic	Hampshire	
9	Cornelius Clarkson Watts	March 4, 1881	March 3, 1885		Democratic	Kanawha	
10	Alfred Caldwell Jr.	March 4, 1885	March 3, 1893		Democratic	Ohio	
11	Thomas S. Riley	March 4, 1893	March 3, 1897		Democratic	Ohio	
12	Edgar P. Rucker	March 4, 1897	March 3, 1901		Republican	McDowell	
13	Romeo H. Freer	March 4, 1901	March 3, 1905		Republican	Ritchie	
14	Clark W. May	March 4, 1905	April 25, 1908		Republican	Lincoln	
15	William G. Conley (Note: William G. Conley was appointed on May 9, 1908 to fill the vacancy caused by the death of Clark W. May on April 25, 1908. Conley was elected to fill the remainder of the term, and for the regular term beginning on March 4, 1909.)	May 9, 1908	March 3, 1913		Republican	Preston	
16	Armistead Abraham Lilly	March 4, 1913	March 3, 1917		Republican	Raleigh	
17	Edward T. England	March 4, 1917	March 3, 1925		Republican	Logan	
18	Howard B. Lee	March 4, 1925	March 3, 1933		Republican	Mercer	
19	Homer A. Holt	March 4, 1933	January 18, 1937		Democratic	Fayette	
20	Clarence W. Meadows (Note: William S. Wysong was appointed on May 24, 1942 to fill the vacancy caused by the resignation of Clarence W. Meadows on May 16, 1942. Ira J. Partlow became the acting attorney general on May 18, 1942, and Wysong was sworn into the office on May 25, 1942.)	January 18, 1937	May 16, 1942		Democratic	Raleigh	
21	William S. Wysong	May 25, 1942	January 13, 1943		Democratic	Webster	
22	James Kay Thomas (Note: James Kay Thomas was elected on November 3, 1942 to fill the remainder of the unexpired term of Clarence W. Meadows. Thomas was sworn in as attorney general on January 13, 1943.)	January 13, 1943	January 15, 1945		Democratic	Kanawha	
23	Ira J. Partlow (Note: Ira J. Partlow resigned on November 7, 1949, and that same day, William C. Marland was appointed to fill the position. Marland was sworn in on December 1, 1949 to fill the vacancy and was elected in 1950 to fill the remainder of the Partlow's unexpired term.)	January 15, 1945	November 7, 1949		Democratic	McDowell	
24	William C. Marland	December 1, 1949	February 1, 1952		Democratic	Wyoming	
25	Chauncey Browning Sr. (Note: William C. Marland announced his resignation on January 30, 1952 to run for election as governor, and his resignation was effective February 1, 1952. Chauncey H. Browning, Sr. was sworn in on February 1, 1952 to fill the vacancy caused by Marland's resignation. Browning served in the position until August 16, 1952, at which time John G. Fox was appointed as Browning's replacement.)	February 1, 1952	August 16, 1952		Democratic	Logan	
26	John G. Fox (Note: John G. Fox was appointed as the replacement for Chauncey H. Browning, Sr. on August 16, 1952, and was elected to a full term in November 1952, after which he was sworn into his full term on January 19, 1953.)	August 16, 1952	January 14, 1957		Democratic	Fayette	
27	Wally Barron	January 14, 1957	January 16, 1961		Democratic	Randolph	
28	C. Donald Robertson	January 16, 1961	January 13, 1969		Democratic	Harrison	
29	Chauncey H. Browning Jr.	January 13, 1969	January 14, 1985		Democratic	Logan	
30	Charlie Brown	January 14, 1985	August 21, 1989		Democratic	Kanawha	
31	Roger W. Tompkins II (Note: Roger W. Tompkins was appointed to fill the vacancy caused by the resignation of Charlie Brown on August 21, 1989.)	September 5, 1989	January 14, 1991		Democratic	Kanawha	
32	Mario Palumbo (Note: Mario Palumbo was elected to fill the remainder of the unexpired term of Charlie Brown.)	January 14, 1991	January 18, 1993		Democratic	Kanawha	
33	Darrell McGraw	January 18, 1993	January 14, 2013		Democratic	Wyoming	
34	Patrick Morrisey	January 14, 2013	January 13, 2025		Republican	Jefferson	
35	JB McCuskey	January 13, 2025	Incumbent		Republican		

== Bibliography ==
- Atkinson, George Wesley; Gibbens, Alvaro Franklin (1890). Prominent Men of West Virginia: Biographical Sketches of Representative Men in Every Honorable Vocation, Including Politics, the Law, Theology, Medicine, Education, Finance, Journalism, Trade, Commerce and Agriculture. Wheeling, West Virginia: W. L. Callin. OCLC 3886825 – via Internet Archive.
- Lewis, Virgil Anson (1912). History and Government of West Virginia. New York City & Cincinnati: American Book Company. OCLC 609213478. Archived from the original on April 27, 2016 – via Google Books.
- West Virginia Attorney General's Office (1918). Twenty-Seventh Biennial Report and Official Opinions of the Attorney General of the State of West Virginia. Charleston, West Virginia: Tribune Printing Company. OCLC 506500089. Archived from the original on November 24, 2015 – via Google Books.
- West Virginia Legislature (1916). John T. Harris, Clerk of the West Virginia Senate (ed.). West Virginia Legislative Hand Book and Manual and Official Register, 1916. Charleston, West Virginia: The Tribune Printing Company. OCLC 301330754. Archived from the original on May 29, 2016 – via Google Books.
- West Virginia Legislature (2011). Darrell E. Holmes, Clerk of the West Virginia Senate (ed.). "West Virginia Blue Book, 2011". West Virginia Blue Book. Charleston, West Virginia: Chapman Printing. ISSN 0364-7323. OCLC 1251675.
- West Virginia Legislature (2012). Darrell E. Holmes, Clerk of the West Virginia Senate (ed.). "West Virginia Blue Book, 2012" (PDF). West Virginia Blue Book. Charleston, West Virginia: Chapman Printing. ISSN 0364-7323. OCLC 1251675. Archived from the original (PDF) on October 5, 2015.
