= 2024 United States state auditor elections =

- November 5, 2024

9 state auditor offices 8 states; 1 territory (Note: Seat tallies and popular vote do not include states that do not elect state auditors or territorial state auditors.)
	Majority party	Minority party
Party	Republican	Democratic
Seats before	18	14
Seats after	19	13
Seat change	▲1	▼1
Popular vote	9,944,978	9,250,566
Percentage	51.81%	48.19%
Seats up	5	3
Seats won	6	2
- Democratic hold Republican hold Republican gain Nonpartisan; No election

The 2024 United States state auditor elections were held on November 5, 2024, to elect the state auditors of eight states and one territory. The previous elections for this group of states took place in 2020, while Vermont's state auditor was last elected in 2022.

These elections took place concurrently with the 2024 presidential election, elections to the Senate and House of Representatives, and various other state and local elections. Republicans had a net gain of one seat in these elections, flipping North Carolina.

== Partisan composition ==
Going into the election, there were 18 Republican elected state auditors and 14 Democratic elected state auditors in the United States. This class of state auditor was made up of 5 Republicans and 3 Democrats. Republicans were defending one state auditor office in a state that Joe Biden won in 2020 (Pennsylvania). While, Democrats were defending one state auditor office in a state that Donald Trump won in 2020 (North Carolina).

== Race summary ==
=== States ===
State	Auditor	Party	First elected	Status	Candidates
Montana	Troy Downing	Republican	2020	Incumbent retired to run for U.S. House. Republican hold.	▌ ✓ James Brown (Republican) 61.42%; ▌John Repke (Democratic) 38.58%
North Carolina	Jessica Holmes	Democratic	2023 (appointed)	Interim appointee lost election. Republican gain.	▌ ✓ Dave Boliek (Republican) 49.35%; ▌Jessica Holmes (Democratic) 47.61%; ▌Bob Drach (Libertarian) 3.03%
North Dakota	Josh Gallion	Republican	2016	Incumbent re-elected.	▌ ✓ Josh Gallion (Republican) 68.74%; ▌Timothy Lamb (Democratic) 31.04%
Pennsylvania	Timothy DeFoor	Republican	2020	Incumbent re-elected.	▌ ✓ Timothy DeFoor (Republican) 51.13%; ▌Malcolm Kenyatta (Democratic) 45.94%; ▌Reece Smith (Libertarian) 1.81%; ▌Alan Goodrich (Constitution) 0.82%; ▌Eric Anton (American Solidarity) 0.31%
Utah	John Dougall	Republican	2012	Incumbent retired to run for U.S. House. Republican hold.	▌ ✓ Tina Cannon (Republican) 63.53%; ▌Catherine Voutaz (Democratic) 31.30%; ▌Jeffery Ostler (Constitution) 5.17%
Vermont	Doug Hoffer	Democratic	2012	Incumbent re-elected.	▌ ✓ Doug Hoffer (Democratic) 60.62%; ▌H. Brooke Paige (Republican) 39.22%
Washington	Pat McCarthy	Democratic	2016	Incumbent re-elected.	▌ ✓ Pat McCarthy (Democratic) 57.99%; ▌Matt Hawkins (Republican) 41.92%
West Virginia	JB McCuskey	Republican	2016	Incumbent retired to run for attorney general. Republican hold.	▌ ✓ Mark Hunt (Republican) 68.72%; ▌Mary Ann Claytor (Democratic) 31.28%

=== Territory ===
Territory	Incumbent	Party	First elected	Result	Candidates
Guam	Benjamin Cruz	Nonpartisan (Note: The territorial auditor of Guam is elected on a nonpartisan basis, although individuals do affiliate with national parties. In Cruz's case, this is with the Democratic Party.)	2018 (special)	Incumbent re-elected.	▌ ✓ Benjamin Cruz (Nonpartisan) 99.1%

== Closest races ==
States where the margin of victory was between 1% and 5%:

1. North Carolina, 1.74%

States where the margin of victory was under 10%:

1. Pennsylvania, 5.19%

Blue denotes races won by Democrats. Red denotes races won by Republicans.

== Montana ==
Montana State Auditor election

Nominee	James Brown	John Repke
Party	Republican	Democratic
Popular vote	358,642	225,251
Percentage	61.42%	38.58%
- County results Brown: 50–60% 60–70% 70–80% 80–90% 90–100% Repke: 50–60% 60–70%
State Auditor before election
Troy Downing
Republican
Elected State Auditor
James Brown
Republican

State Auditor Troy Downing was elected in 2020 with 55.3% of the vote. He retired to run for U.S. House. Republican James Brown defeated Democrat John Repke with 61.4% of the vote.

Republican primary results
Party	Candidate	Votes	%
Republican	James Brown	114,508	69.55%
Republican	John Jay Willoughby	50,131	30.45%
Total votes		164,639	100.00%

Democratic primary results
Party	Candidate	Votes	%
Democratic	John Repke	92,296	100.00%
Total votes		92,296	100.00%

2024 Montana State Auditor election
Party	Candidate	Votes	%	±%
Republican	James Brown	358,642	61.42%	+6.10
Democratic	John Repke	225,251	38.58%	–0.81
Total votes		583,893	100.00%	
Republican hold		Swing	{{{swing}}}	

== North Carolina ==
North Carolina State Auditor election

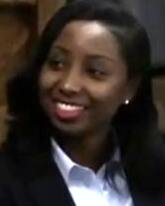
Nominee	Dave Boliek	Jessica Holmes
Party	Republican	Democratic
Popular vote	2,729,780	2,633,607
Percentage	49.35%	47.61%
- County results Boliek: 40–50% 50–60% 60–70% 70–80% Holmes: 40–50% 50–60% 60–70% 70–80%
State Auditor before election
Jessica Holmes
Democratic
Elected State Auditor
Dave Boliek
Republican

State Auditor Jessica Holmes was appointed to the position after her predecessor Beth Wood resigned. She ran for a full term but was defeated by Republican Dave Boliek who won with 49.4% of the vote.

Republican primary results
Party	Candidate	Votes	%
Republican	Jack Clark	198,793	23.24%
Republican	Dave Boliek	189,071	22.10%
Republican	Charles Dingee	159,351	18.63%
Republican	Jeff Tarte	127,981	14.96%
Republican	Tony Street	95,863	11.21%
Republican	Jim Kee	84,302	9.86%
Total votes		855,361	100.0%

Republican primary runoff results
Party	Candidate	Votes	%
Republican	Dave Boliek	67,173	53.18%
Republican	Jack Clark	59,130	46.82%
Total votes		126,303	100.0%

2024 North Carolina State Auditor election
Party	Candidate	Votes	%	±%
Republican	Dave Boliek	2,729,780	49.35%	+0.23%
Democratic	Jessica Holmes (incumbent)	2,633,607	47.61%	−3.27%
Libertarian	Bob Drach	167,701	3.03%	N/A
Total votes		5,531,088	100.0%	
Republican gain from Democratic				

== North Dakota ==
North Dakota State Auditor election
Nominee	Josh Gallion	Timothy Lamb
Party	Republican	Democratic–NPL
Popular vote	241,270	108,962
Percentage	68.7%	31.0%
- County results Gallion: 50–60% 60–70% 70–80% 80–90% >90% Lamb: 60–70%
State Auditor before election
Josh Gallion
Republican
Elected State Auditor
Josh Gallion
Republican

State Auditor Josh Gallion was re-elected in 2020 with 67.7% of the vote. He won re-election to a third term against Democrat Timothy Lamb with 68.7% of the vote.

Republican primary results
Party	Candidate	Votes	%
Republican	Josh Gallion (incumbent)	81,069	99.24%
Write-in		617	0.76%
Total votes		81,686	100.00%

Democratic–NPL primary results
Party	Candidate	Votes	%
Democratic–NPL	Timothy Lamb	18,987	99.76%
Write-in		45	0.24%
Total votes		19,032	100.00%

2024 North Dakota State Auditor election
Party	Candidate	Votes	%
Republican	Josh Gallion (incumbent)	241,270	68.74%
Democratic–NPL	Timothy Lamb	108,962	31.04%
Write-in		761	0.22%
Total votes		350,993	100.00%
Republican hold			

== Pennsylvania ==
Pennsylvania Auditor General election
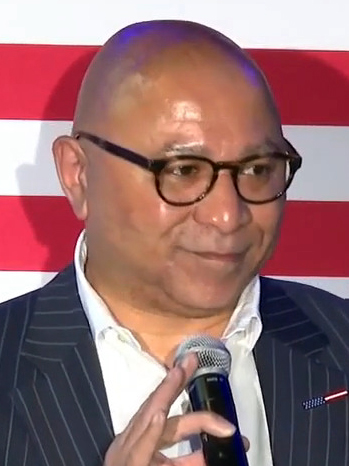

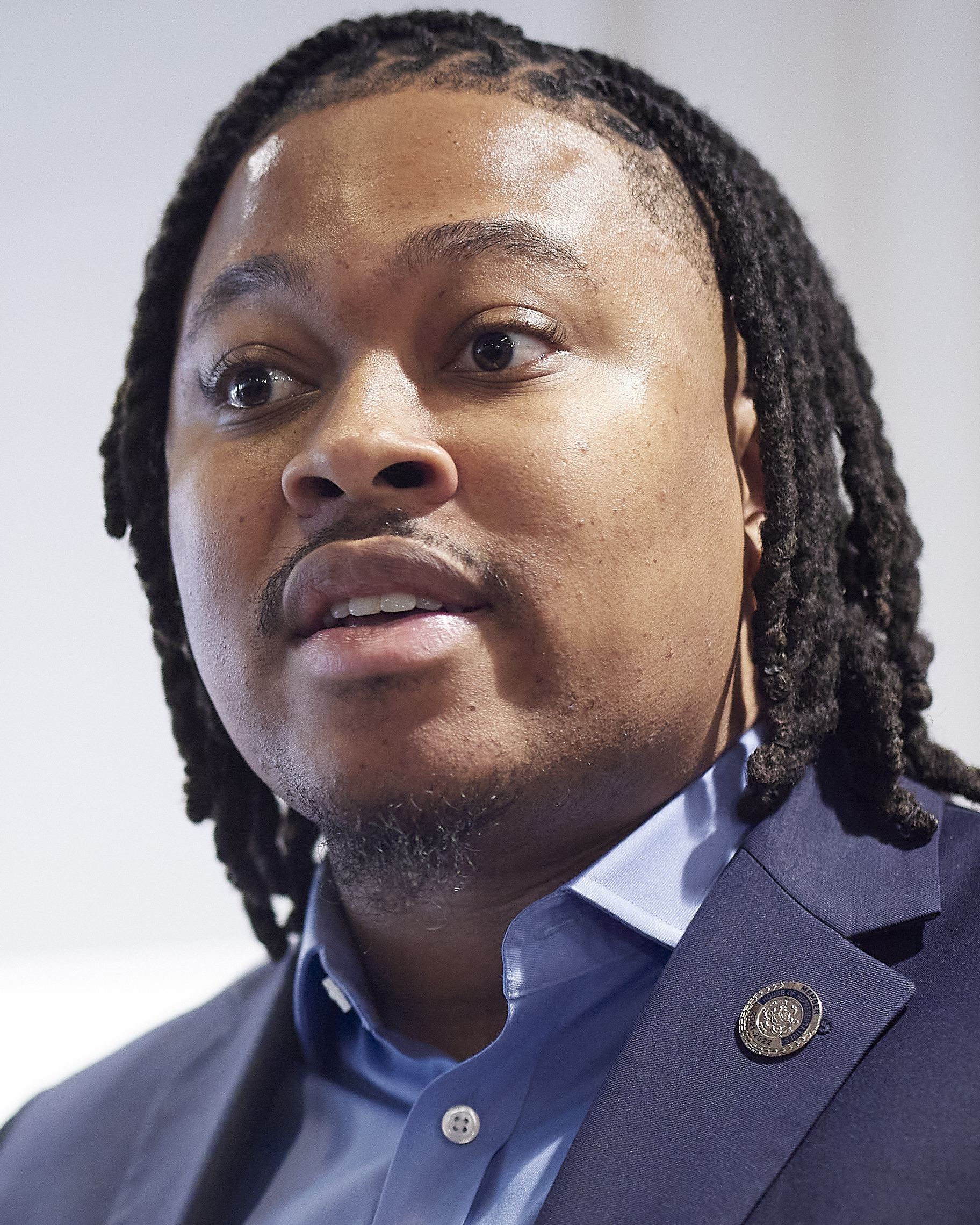
Nominee	Timothy DeFoor	Malcolm Kenyatta
Party	Republican	Democratic
Popular vote	3,489,652	3,135,412
Percentage	51.13%	45.94%
- County results DeFoor: 40–50% 50–60% 60–70% 70–80% 80–90% Kenyatta: 40–50% 50–60% 70–80%
Auditor General before election
Timothy DeFoor
Republican
Elected Auditor General
Timothy DeFoor
Republican

State Auditor Timothy DeFoor was elected in 2020 with 49.4% of the vote. He won re-election to a second term against Democrat Malcolm Kenyatta with 51.1% of the vote.

Democratic primary results
Party	Candidate	Votes	%
Democratic	Malcolm Kenyatta	655,687	64.54%
Democratic	Mark Pinsley	360,182	35.46%
Total votes		1,015,869	100.0%

2024 Pennsylvania Auditor General election
Party	Candidate	Votes	%
Republican	Timothy DeFoor (incumbent)	3,489,652	51.13
Democratic	Malcolm Kenyatta	3,135,412	45.94
Libertarian	Reece Smith	123,628	1.81
Constitution	Alan (Bob) Goodrich	55,981	0.82
American Solidarity	Eric K. Anton	20,989	0.31
Total votes		6,825,662	100.00

== Utah ==
Utah State Auditor election
Nominee	Tina Cannon	Catherine Voutaz	Jeffery Ostler
Party	Republican	Democratic	Constitution
Popular vote	906,531	446,608	73,741
Percentage	63.53%	31.30%	5.17%
- County results Cannon: 40–50% 50–60% 60–70% 70–80% 80–90% Voutaz: 40–50% 50–60%
State Auditor before election
John Dougall
Republican
Elected State Auditor
Tina Cannon
Republican

State Auditor John Dougall was re-elected in 2020 with 74.8% of the vote. He retired to run for U.S. House. Republican Tina Cannon defeated Democrat Cathrine Voutaz with 63.5% of the vote.

Republican primary results
Party	Candidate	Votes	%
Republican	Tina Cannon	226,479	56.96%
Republican	Ricky Hatch	171,144	43.04%
Total votes		397,623	100.00%

2024 Utah State Auditor election
Party	Candidate	Votes	%
Republican	Tina Cannon	906,531	63.53%
Democratic	Catherine Voutaz	446,608	31.30%
Constitution	Jeffery Ostler	73,741	5.17%
Total votes		1,409,537	100.00%

== Vermont ==
Vermont Auditor of Accounts election
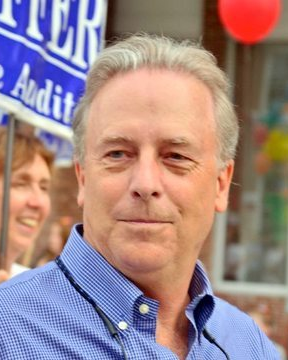

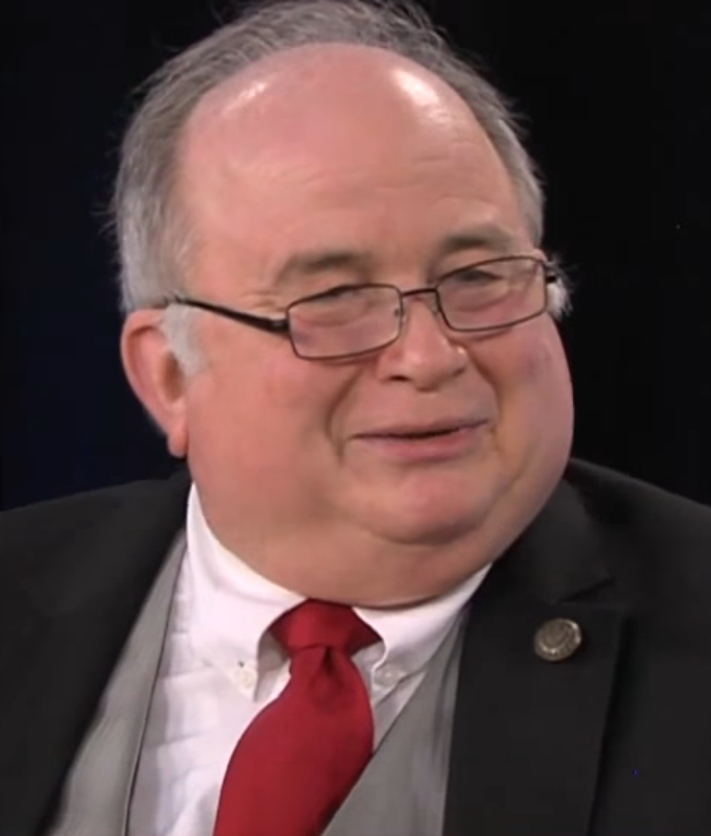
Nominee	Doug Hoffer	H. Brooke Paige
Party	Democratic	Republican
Alliance	Progressive
Popular vote	207,195	134,066
Percentage	60.62%	39.22%
- Hoffer: 50–60% 60–70% 70–80% 80–90% Paige: 40–50% 50–60% 60–70% 70–80% No Data/Vote
State Auditor before election
Doug Hoffer
Democratic
Elected State Auditor
Doug Hoffer
Democratic

State Auditor Doug Hoffer was re-elected in 2022 with 65.1% of the vote. He won re-election to a seventh term against Republican H. Brooke Paige with 60.6% of the vote.

Democratic primary results
Party	Candidate	Votes	%
Democratic	Doug Hoffer (incumbent)	43,893	99.23%
Write-in		341	0.77%
Total votes		44,204	100.00%

Republican primary results
Party	Candidate	Votes	%
Republican	H. Brooke Paige	18,129	96.55%
Write-in		647	3.45%
Total votes		18,776	100.00%

2024 Vermont State Auditor Election
Party	Candidate	Votes	%
Democratic	Doug Hoffer (incumbent)	207,195	60.62%
Republican	H. Brooke Paige	134,066	39.22%
Write-in		532	0.16%
Total votes		341,793	100.00%

== Washington ==
Washington State Auditor election
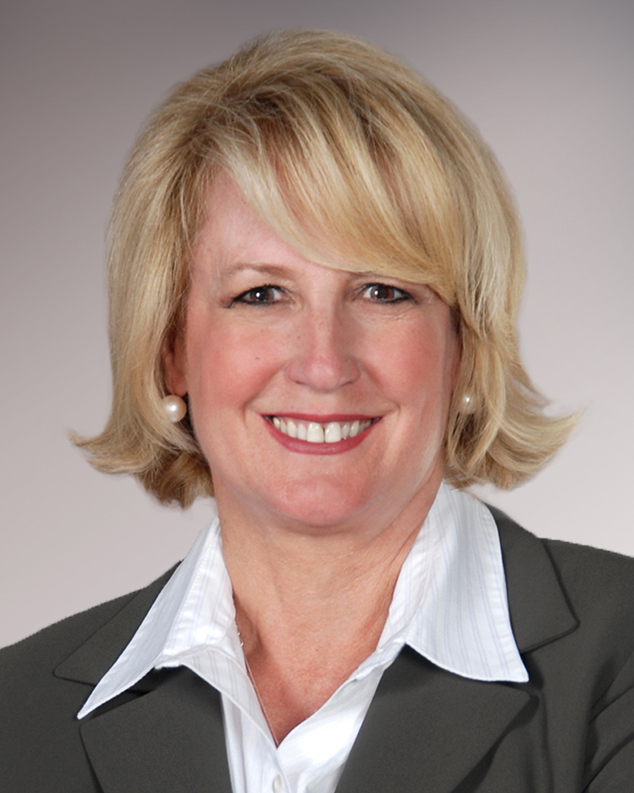

Nominee	Pat McCarthy	Matt Hawkins
Party	Democratic	Republican
Popular vote	2,170,306	1,568,750
Percentage	57.99%	41.92%
- County results McCarthy: 50–60% 60–70% 70–80% Hawkins: 50–60% 60–70% 70–80%
State Auditor before election
Pat McCarthy
Democratic
Elected State Auditor
Pat McCarthy
Democratic

State Auditor Pat McCarthy was re-elected in 2020 with 58.0% of the vote. She won re-election to a third term against Republican Matt Hawkins with 60.6% of the vote.

Blanket primary results
Party	Candidate	Votes	%
Democratic	Pat McCarthy (incumbent)	1,125,904	58.82%
Republican	Matt Hawkins	786,529	41.09%
Write-in		1,648	0.09%
Total votes		1,914,081	100.0%

2024 Washington State Auditor election
Party	Candidate	Votes	%	±%
Democratic	Pat McCarthy (incumbent)	2,170,306	57.99%	–0.01%
Republican	Matt Hawkins	1,568,750	41.92%	–
Write-in		3,262	0.09%	–
Total votes		3,742,318	100.00%	N/A
Democratic hold				

== West Virginia ==
West Virginia State Auditor election
Nominee	Mark Hunt	Mary Ann Claytor
Party	Republican	Democratic
Popular vote	488,737	222,491
Percentage	68.72%	31.28%
- County results Hunt: 50–60% 60–70% 70–80% 80–90%
State Auditor before election
JB McCuskey
Republican
Elected State Auditor
Mark Hunt
Republican

State Auditor JB McCuskey was re-elected in 2020 with 67.0% of the vote. He retired to run for attorney general. Republican Mark Hunt defeated Democrat Mary Ann Claytor with 68.7% of the vote.

Republican primary results
Party	Candidate	Votes	%
Republican	Mark Hunt	74,912	39.26%
Republican	Eric Householder	48,632	25.49%
Republican	Tricia Jackson	37,039	19.41%
Republican	Caleb Hanna	30,217	15.84%
Total votes		190,800	100.00%

Democratic primary results
Party	Candidate	Votes	%
Democratic	Mary Ann Claytor	84,124	100.00%
Total votes		84,124	100.00%

General election results
Party	Candidate	Votes	%
Republican	Mark Hunt	488,737	68.72%
Democratic	Mary Ann Claytor	222,491	31.28%
Total votes		711,228	100.00%
Republican hold			

== Territories ==
=== Guam ===
Guam Public Auditor election
Nominee	Benjamin Cruz
Party	Nonpartsian
Popular vote	24,905
Percentage	99.12%

State Auditor Benjamin Cruz was re-elected in 2020 unopposed. He won re-election to a second full term unopposed.

== See also ==
- 2024 United States elections
