= 2024 West Virginia State Auditor election =

- November 5, 2024
| Nominee | Mark Hunt | Mary Ann Claytor |
| Party | Republican | Democratic |
| Popular vote | 488,737 | 222,491 |
| Percentage | 68.72% | 31.28% |
- Hunt: 50–60% 60–70% 70–80% 80–90%
State Auditor before election
JB McCuskey
Republican
Elected State Auditor
Mark Hunt
Republican

The 2024 West Virginia State Auditor election took place on November 5, 2024, to elect the next West Virginia state auditor. Incumbent Republican auditor JB McCuskey did not seek re-election, instead opting to run for attorney general. Primary elections took place on May 14, 2024.

== Republican primary ==
=== Candidates ===
==== Nominee ====
- Mark Hunt, state senator from the 8th district (2022–present)

==== Eliminated in primary ====
- Caleb Hanna, former state delegate from the 44th district (2018–2024)
- Eric Householder, Majority Leader of the West Virginia House of Delegates (2023–present) from the 96th district (2010–present)
- Tricia Jackson, Jefferson County commissioner

==== Declined ====
- JB McCuskey, incumbent state auditor (ran for attorney general)

=== Results ===
Results by county: Hunt: 30–40%; 40–50%; 50–60%; 60–70%; Householder: 20–30%; 30–40%; 40–50%; 50–60%; 60–70%; 70–80%; Jackson: 30–40%; 50–60%; Hanna: 30–40%; 40–50%; 50–60%

Republican primary results
| Party | Candidate | Votes | % |
|---|---|---|---|
| Republican | Mark Hunt | 74,912 | 39.26% |
| Republican | Eric Householder | 48,632 | 25.49% |
| Republican | Tricia Jackson | 37,039 | 19.41% |
| Republican | Caleb Hanna | 30,217 | 15.84% |
| Total votes | | 190,800 | 100.00% |

== Democratic primary ==
=== Candidates ===
==== Nominee ====
- Mary Ann Claytor, accountant and nominee for state auditor in 2016 and 2020

=== Results ===
Democratic primary results
| Party | Candidate | Votes | % |
|---|---|---|---|
| Democratic | Mary Ann Claytor | 84,124 | 100.00% |
| Total votes | | 84,124 | 100.00% |

== General election ==
=== Results ===
2024 West Virginia State Auditor election
| Party | Candidate | Votes | % |
|---|---|---|---|
| Republican | Mark Hunt | 488,737 | 68.72% |
| Democratic | Mary Ann Claytor | 222,491 | 31.28% |
| Total votes | | 711,228 | 100.00% |
| Republican hold | | | |

==== By county ====
| County | Mark Hunt Republican | | Mary Ann Claytor Democratic | | Margin | | Total |
| County | # | % | # | % | # | % | Total |
|---|---|---|---|---|---|---|---|
| Barbour | 4,595 | 77.62% | 1,325 | 22.38% | 3,270 | 55.24% | 5,920 |
| Berkeley | 35,641 | 67.01% | 17,543 | 32.99% | 18,098 | 34.03% | 53,184 |
| Boone | 5,595 | 73.98% | 1,968 | 26.02% | 3,627 | 47.96% | 7,563 |
| Braxton | 3,558 | 72.70% | 1,336 | 27.30% | 2,222 | 45.40% | 4,894 |
| Brooke | 6,162 | 68.35% | 2,854 | 31.65% | 3,308 | 36.69% | 9,016 |
| Cabell | 19,815 | 60.09% | 13,158 | 39.91% | 6,657 | 20.19% | 32,973 |
| Calhoun | 2,020 | 77.42% | 589 | 22.58% | 1,431 | 54.85% | 2,609 |
| Clay | 2,244 | 74.53% | 767 | 25.47% | 1,477 | 49.05% | 3,011 |
| Doddridge | 2,297 | 83.86% | 442 | 16.14% | 1,855 | 67.73% | 2,739 |
| Fayette | 10,164 | 69.47% | 4,466 | 30.53% | 5,698 | 38.95% | 14,630 |
| Gilmer | 1,555 | 72.09% | 602 | 27.91% | 953 | 44.18% | 2,157 |
| Grant | 4,346 | 87.83% | 602 | 12.17% | 3,744 | 75.67% | 4,948 |
| Greenbrier | 9,861 | 70.02% | 4,222 | 29.98% | 5,639 | 40.04% | 14,083 |
| Hampshire | 7,799 | 79.72% | 1,984 | 20.28% | 5,815 | 59.44% | 9,783 |
| Hancock | 8,584 | 70.51% | 3,591 | 29.49% | 4,993 | 41.01% | 12,175 |
| Hardy | 4,553 | 75.86% | 1,449 | 24.14% | 3,104 | 51.72% | 6,002 |
| Harrison | 19,029 | 68.51% | 8,748 | 31.49% | 10,281 | 37.01% | 27,777 |
| Jackson | 9,365 | 76.89% | 2,815 | 23.11% | 6,550 | 53.78% | 12,180 |
| Jefferson | 16,052 | 57.82% | 11,710 | 42.18% | 4,342 | 15.64% | 27,762 |
| Kanawha | 40,729 | 57.42% | 30,206 | 42.58% | 10,523 | 14.83% | 70,935 |
| Lewis | 5,148 | 77.03% | 1,535 | 22.97% | 3,613 | 54.06% | 6,683 |
| Lincoln | 5,062 | 76.38% | 1,565 | 23.62% | 3,497 | 52.77% | 6,627 |
| Logan | 7,828 | 78.90% | 2,093 | 21.10% | 5,735 | 57.81% | 9,921 |
| Marion | 14,288 | 61.63% | 8,896 | 38.37% | 5,392 | 23.26% | 23,184 |
| Marshall | 8,767 | 70.22% | 3,718 | 29.78% | 5,049 | 40.44% | 12,485 |
| Mason | 7,484 | 75.19% | 2,470 | 24.81% | 5,014 | 50.37% | 9,954 |
| McDowell | 3,404 | 75.08% | 1,130 | 24.92% | 2,274 | 50.15% | 4,534 |
| Mercer | 16,976 | 76.82% | 5,122 | 23.18% | 11,854 | 53.64% | 22,098 |
| Mineral | 9,698 | 78.80% | 2,609 | 21.20% | 7,089 | 57.60% | 12,307 |
| Mingo | 6,123 | 82.67% | 1,284 | 17.33% | 4,839 | 65.33% | 7,407 |
| Monongalia | 20,099 | 51.35% | 19,044 | 48.65% | 1,055 | 2.70% | 39,143 |
| Monroe | 4,756 | 79.23% | 1,247 | 20.77% | 3,509 | 58.45% | 6,003 |
| Morgan | 6,453 | 76.45% | 1,988 | 23.55% | 4,465 | 52.90% | 8,441 |
| Nicholas | 7,274 | 77.81% | 2,074 | 22.19% | 5,200 | 55.63% | 9,348 |
| Ohio | 10,660 | 60.75% | 6,888 | 39.25% | 3,772 | 21.50% | 17,548 |
| Pendleton | 2,374 | 76.21% | 741 | 23.79% | 1,633 | 52.42% | 3,115 |
| Pleasants | 2,355 | 75.87% | 749 | 24.13% | 1,606 | 51.74% | 3,104 |
| Pocahontas | 2,505 | 70.94% | 1,026 | 29.06% | 1,479 | 41.89% | 3,531 |
| Preston | 10,060 | 75.35% | 3,291 | 24.65% | 6,769 | 50.70% | 13,351 |
| Putnam | 18,280 | 70.68% | 7,582 | 29.32% | 10,698 | 41.37% | 25,862 |
| Raleigh | 21,508 | 75.36% | 7,034 | 24.64% | 14,474 | 50.71% | 28,542 |
| Randolph | 7,550 | 70.15% | 3,212 | 29.85% | 4,338 | 40.31% | 10,762 |
| Ritchie | 3,055 | 83.27% | 614 | 16.73% | 2,441 | 66.53% | 3,669 |
| Roane | 4,022 | 76.73% | 1,220 | 23.27% | 2,802 | 53.45% | 5,242 |
| Summers | 3,503 | 72.54% | 1,326 | 27.46% | 2,177 | 45.08% | 4,829 |
| Taylor | 5,032 | 72.90% | 1,871 | 27.10% | 3,161 | 45.79% | 6,903 |
| Tucker | 2,318 | 69.40% | 1,022 | 30.60% | 1,296 | 38.80% | 3,340 |
| Tyler | 2,706 | 80.32% | 663 | 19.68% | 2,043 | 60.64% | 3,369 |
| Upshur | 7,097 | 77.09% | 2,109 | 22.91% | 4,988 | 54.18% | 9,206 |
| Wayne | 10,224 | 72.72% | 3,836 | 27.28% | 6,388 | 45.43% | 14,060 |
| Webster | 2,075 | 77.08% | 617 | 22.92% | 1,458 | 54.16% | 2,692 |
| Wetzel | 4,074 | 72.44% | 1,550 | 27.56% | 2,524 | 44.88% | 5,624 |
| Wirt | 1,871 | 79.35% | 487 | 20.65% | 1,384 | 58.69% | 2,358 |
| Wood | 24,637 | 70.62% | 10,249 | 29.38% | 14,388 | 41.24% | 34,886 |
| Wyoming | 5,507 | 81.48% | 1,252 | 18.52% | 4,255 | 62.95% | 6,759 |
| Totals | 488,737 | 68.72% | 222,491 | 31.28% | 266,246 | 37.43% | 711,228 |

==== By congressional district ====
Hunt won both congressional districts.

| District | Hunt | Claytor | Representative |
|---|---|---|---|
| 1st | 70% | 30% | Carol Miller |
| 2nd | 68% | 32% | Alex Mooney (118th Congress) |
| 2nd | 68% | 32% | Riley Moore (119th Congress) |
