= 2016 West Virginia elections =

- November 6, 2016

West Virginia held elections on November 8, 2016. Elections for the United States House, as well as for several statewide offices including the governorship were held. These elections were held concurrently with the 2016 U.S. presidential election and other elections nationwide. Primary elections were held on May 10, 2016.

== Federal offices ==
=== President ===
Republican Donald Trump easily carried West Virginia, capturing 68.5% of the vote and sweeping every county in the state, his strongest vote share in the nation.

=== House of Representatives ===
All 3 Incumbent Republican U.S. Representatives were easily reelected, all increasing their vote share compared to 2014.

== Governor ==
Incumbent Democrat Earl Ray Tomblin was term-limited from running again in 2016. State Senate President Bill Cole ran unopposed in the Republican primary contest, while businessman Jim Justice defeated multiple opponents in the Democratic primary contest. The state's Republican trend, coupled with past scandals surrounding Justice's unpaid taxes and business controversies, made the race extremely competitive. Justice went on to narrowly win the election, capturing 49.1% of the vote. Justice would go on to switch party affiliation just months after being in office, announcing he would become a Republican at an August 4, 2017 rally with President Trump.

== State Legislature ==
=== State senate ===
18 of the 34 State Senate seats were up for election in 2016, with 3 Democrats and 1 Republican incumbents not running for reelection. Republicans won a net gain of 4 seats, increasing their majority in the state senate from 18 to 22 seats.

=== House of Delegates ===
All 100 seats in the West Virginia House of Delegates were up for election, with 13 Republican and 8 Democratic incumbents not running for reelection. The Republican majority sustained a net loss of 1 seat, decreasing the majority from 64 seats to 63. This soon changed when Democrat Rupert Phillips Jr. switched party affiliation to Independent in January 2017, and then to Republican in May 2017 reestablishing the 64–36 majority from 2014.

== Attorney General ==
2016 West Virginia Attorney General election
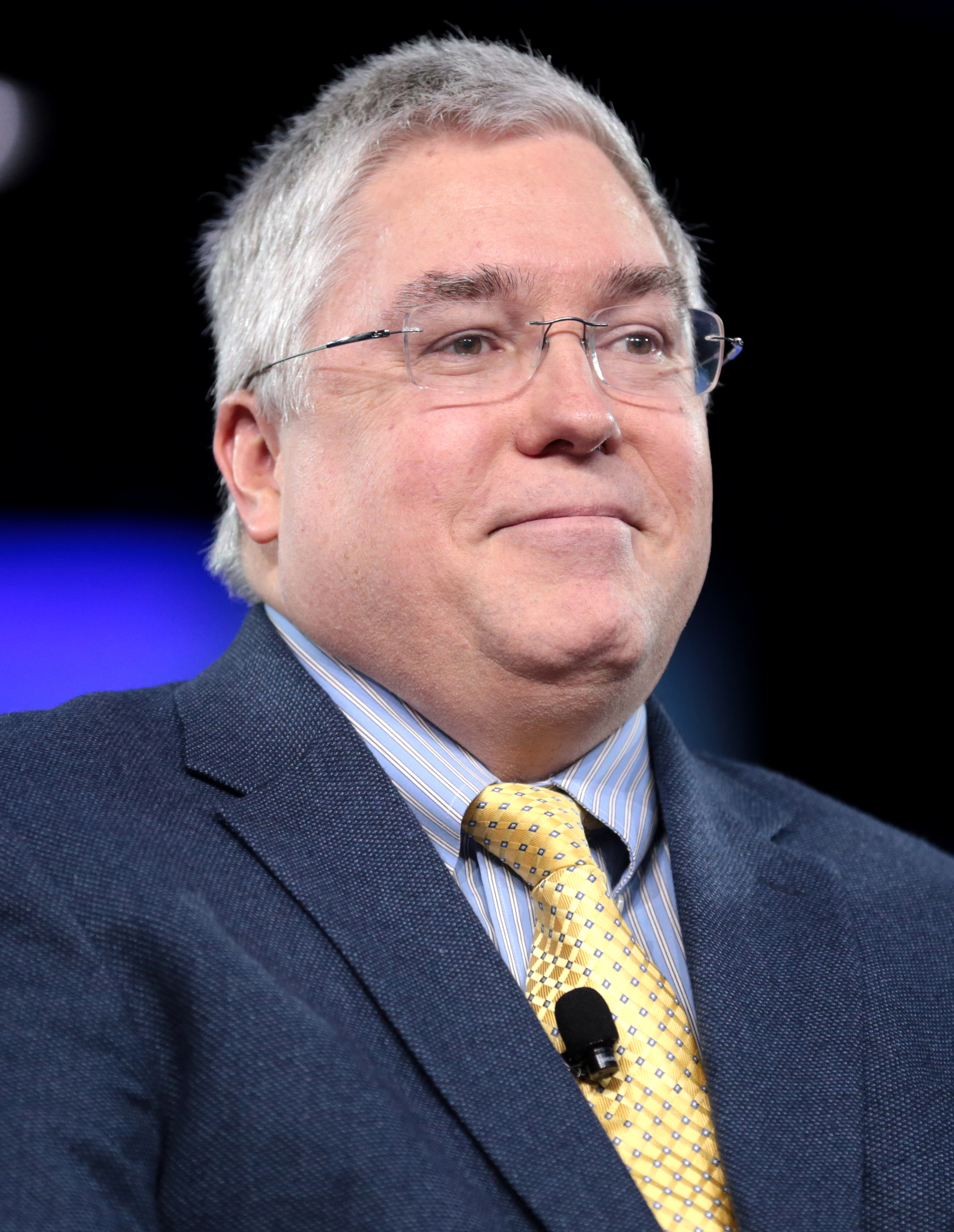

Nominee	Patrick Morrisey	Doug Reynolds
Party	Republican	Democratic
Popular vote	358,424	291,232
Percentage	51.6%	41.9%
- Morrisey: 40–50% 50–60% 60–70% 70–80% Reynolds: 40–50% 50–60%
Attorney General before election
Patrick Morrisey
Republican
Elected Attorney General
Patrick Morrisey
Republican

Republican incumbent Patrick Morrisey successfully sought re-election, defeating Delegate Doug Reynolds, and capturing 51.63% of the vote.

=== Republican primary ===
Republican primary results
Party	Candidate	Votes	%
Republican	Patrick Morrisey (incumbent)	157,369	100.00
Total votes		157,369	100.00

=== Democratic primary ===
Democratic primary results
Party	Candidate	Votes	%
Democratic	Doug Reynolds	187,786	100.00
Total votes		187,786	100.00

=== General election ===
==== Predictions ====
Source	Ranking
Governing	Likely R

==== Results ====
General election results
Party	Candidate	Votes	%
Republican	Patrick Morrisey (incumbent)	358,424	51.63
Democratic	Doug Reynolds	291,232	41.95
Libertarian	Karl Kolenich	24,023	3.46
Mountain	Michael Sharley	20,475	2.95
Total votes		694,154	100.00

== Secretary of State ==
Republican challenger Mac Warner defeated incumbent Democrat Natalie Tennant who had held the position since 2009. He captured 48.52% of the vote. Warner was re-elected Secretary of State in 2020 in a rematch with Tennant.

=== Republican primary ===
Republican primary results
Party	Candidate	Votes	%
Republican	Mac Warner	105,800	63.33
Republican	Barry Holstein	61,271	36.67
Total votes		167,071	100.00

=== Democratic primary ===
Democratic primary results
Party	Candidate	Votes	%
Democratic	Natalie Tennant (incumbent)	192,176	77.18
Democratic	Patsy Trecost	56,832	22.82
Total votes		249,008	100.00

=== General election ===
General election results
Party	Candidate	Votes	%
Republican	Mac Warner	335,526	48.52
Democratic	Natalie Tennant (incumbent)	323,750	46.82
Libertarian	John S. Buckley	32,179	4.65
Total votes		691,455	100.00

== Treasurer ==
Democratic incumbent John Perdue, who had held the West Virginia State Treasurer's position since 1996, was re-elected with 50.33% of the vote. He defeated Republican challenger and businesswoman Ann Urling. Perdue became the only Democrat to hold statewide executive office in West Virginia after Governor Justice's party switch in 2017. As of 2025, this is the last time a Democrat has won an outright majority of the vote in a statewide election in West Virginia.

=== Republican primary ===
Republican primary results
Party	Candidate	Votes	%
Republican	Ann Urling	88,703	54.94
Republican	Larry V. Faircloth	72,741	45.06
Total votes		161,444	100.00

=== Democratic primary ===
Democratic primary results
Party	Candidate	Votes	%
Democratic	John Perdue (incumbent)	208,203	100.00
Total votes		208,203	100.00

=== General election ===
General election results
Party	Candidate	Votes	%
Democratic	John Perdue (incumbent)	338,018	50.33
Republican	Ann Urling	293,671	43.73
Libertarian	Michael A. Young	39,865	5.94
Total votes		671,554	100.00

== Auditor ==
2016 West Virginia State Auditor election
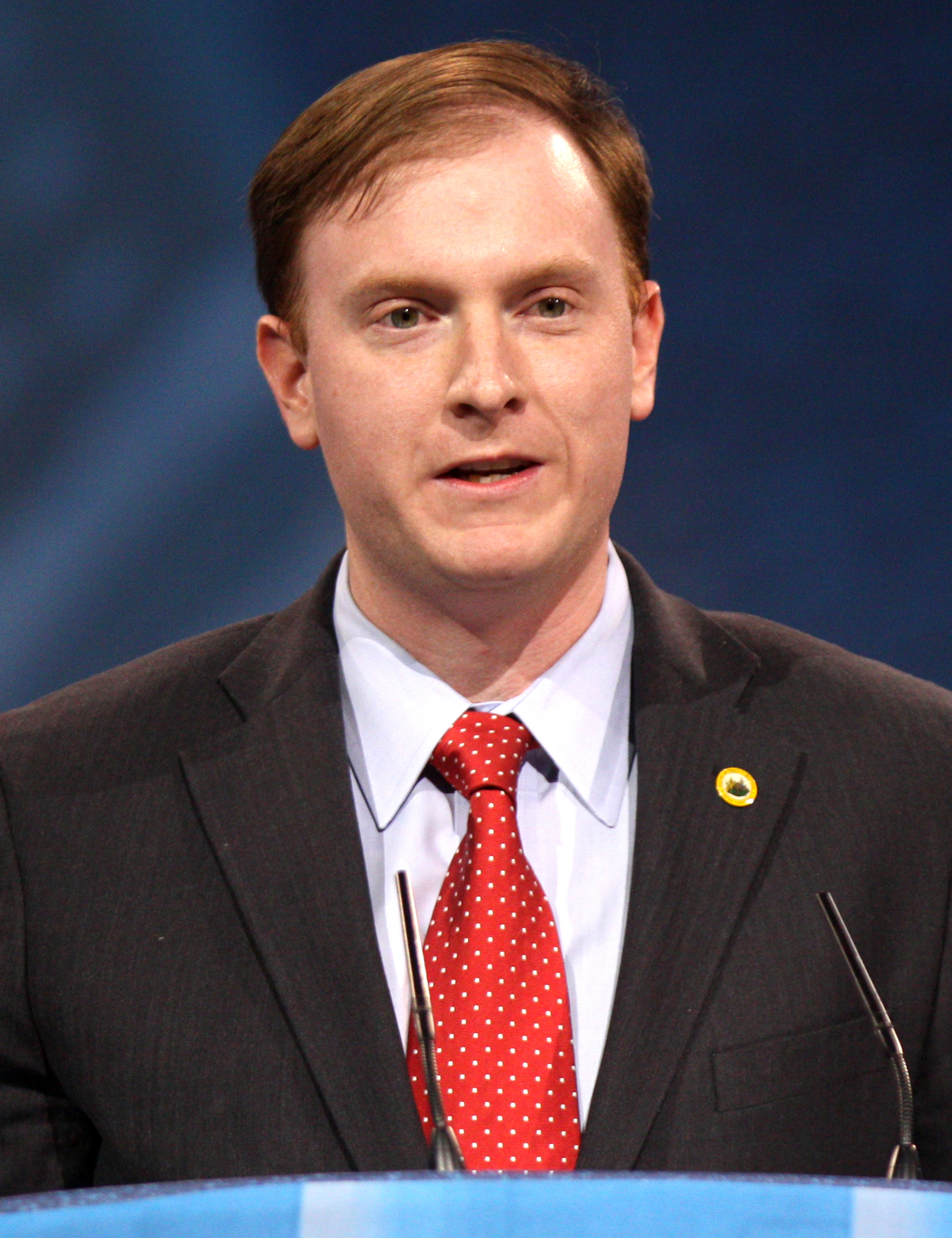

Nominee	JB McCuskey	Mary Ann Claytor	Brenton Ricketts
Party	Republican	Democratic	Libertarian
Popular vote	385,831	228,001	45,908
Percentage	58.4%	34.5%	6.9%
- County results McCuskey: 40–50% 50–60% 60–70% 70–80%
State Auditor before election
Lisa Hopkins (acting)
Democratic
Elected State Auditor
JB McCuskey
Republican

Republican JB McCuskey was elected with 58.48% of the vote over Democrat Mary Ann Claytor. This marks the first time since 1928 that a Republican had won the office. The seat was open after the resignation of Democrat Glen Glainer III, who had held the office since 1992. In May 2016, Lisa Hopkins was appointed as interim Auditor until the election.

=== Republican primary ===
Republican primary results
Party	Candidate	Votes	%
Republican	JB McCuskey	149,793	100.00
Total votes		149,793	100.00

=== Democratic primary ===
Democratic primary results
Party	Candidate	Votes	%
Democratic	Mary Ann Claytor	93,790	43.95
Democratic	Jason Pizatella	73,371	34.38
Democratic	Robin Righter	46,257	21.67
Total votes		213,418	100.00

=== General election ===
General election results
Party	Candidate	Votes	%
Republican	JB McCuskey	385,831	58.48
Democratic	Mary Ann Claytor	228,001	34.56
Libertarian	Brenton Ricketts	45,908	6.96
Total votes		659,740	100.00

== Commissioner of Agriculture ==
Leonhardt: 40–50%; 50–60%; 60–70%; Helmick: 40–50%; 50–60%; 60–70%

Elected in 2012, incumbent Agriculture Commissioner Walt Helmick was defeated by Republican challenger Kent Leonhardt.

=== Republican primary ===
Republican primary results
Party	Candidate	Votes	%
Republican	Kent Leonhardt	147,782	100.00
Total votes		147,782	100.00

=== Democratic primary ===
Democratic primary results
Party	Candidate	Votes	%
Democratic	Walt Helmick (incumbent)	194,220	100.00
Total votes		194,220	100.00

General election results
Party	Candidate	Votes	%
Republican	Kent Leonhardt	321,560	48.41
Democratic	Walt Helmick (incumbent)	274,191	41.28
Libertarian	Buddy A. Guthrie	68,502	10.31
Total votes		664,253	100.00

== Supreme Court of Appeals ==
2016 West Virginia Supreme Court of Appeals election
- May 10, 2016
Nominee	Beth Walker	Darrell McGraw
Popular vote	162,245	94,538
Percentage	39.62%	23.08%
Nominee	William R. Wooton	Brent Benjamin
Popular vote	84,641	51,064
Percentage	20.67%	12.47%
Justice before election
Brent Benjamin
Elected Justice
Beth Walker

Previously before the election, the Republican-controlled West Virginia Legislature passed a law in 2015 making the election of judges non-partisan. The bill was signed into law by Democratic governor Earl Ray Tomblin, making this the first non-partisan West Virginia Supreme Court election in history. As there were no primaries for Justices to run in to become the nominee of a party, the elections were held during the statewide primary elections, usually held in May, instead of the general elections in November.

Originally elected in 2004, incumbent Justice Brent Benjamin lost re-election to another 12 year term on the Supreme Court of Appeals to Beth Walker, a Morgantown attorney and former candidate for the court in 2008. Walker became the first Supreme Court Justice ever elected in a non-partisan race.

=== Results ===
May 10, 2016 West Virginia Supreme Court of Appeals election
Party	Candidate	Votes	%
Nonpartisan	Beth Walker	162,245	39.62%
Nonpartisan	Darrell McGraw	94,538	23.08%
Nonpartisan	William R. Wooton	84,641	20.67%
Nonpartisan	Brent Benjamin (incumbent)	51,064	12.47%
Nonpartisan	Wayne King	17,054	4.16%
Total votes		409,542	100.00%
