= 1992 West Virginia State Auditor election =

- November 3, 1992
Nominee	Glen Gainer III
Party	Democratic
Popular vote	454,654
Percentage	100.00%
- County results Gainer: 100%
State Auditor before election
Glen Gainer Jr.
Democratic
Elected State Auditor
Glen Gainer III
Democratic

The 1992 West Virginia State Auditor election took place on November 3, 1992, to elect the West Virginia State Auditor. Incumbent Democratic State Auditor Glen Gainer Jr. chose not to seek re-election to a fifth term.

Gainer's son, Glen Gainer III won unopposed, as the Republicans did not field a candidate.

== Democratic primary ==
=== Candidates ===
==== Nominee ====
- Glen Gainer III, son of incumbent State Auditor Glen Gainer Jr.

==== Eliminated in primary ====
- Mark Manchin, State Senator from the 8th district and son of former State Treasurer A. James Manchin.

==== Declined ====
- Glen Gainer Jr., incumbent State Auditor.

=== Polling ===
Poll source	Date(s) administered	Sample size	Margin of error	Glen Gainer	Mark Manchin	Undecided
West Virginia Poll	April 27 - 30, 1992	318 (V)	± 5.5%	43%	25%	32%

=== Results ===
May 12, Democratic primary
Party	Candidate	Votes	%
Democratic	Glen Gainer III	179,303	62.62%
Democratic	Mark Manchin	107,052	37.38%
Total votes		286,355	100.00%

== General election ==
=== Results ===
1992 West Virginia State Auditor election
Party	Candidate	Votes	%
Democratic	Glen Gainer III	454,654	100.00%
Total votes		454,654	100.00%
Democratic hold			
