= Glen Gainer III =

American politician

Glen Gainer

19th Auditor of West Virginia
- In office January 13, 1993 – May 14, 2016
- Governor: Gaston Caperton; Cecil H. Underwood; Bob Wise; Joe Manchin; Earl Ray Tomblin
- Preceded by: Glen Gainer Jr.
- Succeeded by: Lisa Hopkins (acting)

Personal details
- Born: February 26, 1960 (age 65); Parkersburg, West Virginia, U.S.
- Political party: Democratic
- Spouse: Susan Gainer (1984–present)
- Children: 2
- Education: University of Charleston (BA)

Glen B. Gainer III (born February 26, 1960) is an American politician and member of the Democratic Party who served as the 19th State Auditor of West Virginia from 1993 until he resigned in 2016.

== Early life and career ==
Glen B. Gainer III was born in 1960 to Glen. B Gainer Jr. and Sally Jo Gainer. He has one sister, Beth, and one brother, John David (deceased). He graduated with a bachelor's degree in political science from the University of Charleston in 1982. He married Susan Ryder in 1984 and they have two sons.

Gainer worked in the West Virginia State Treasurer's office from 1985 to 1989, was the budget director of the West Virginia Department of Energy from 1989 to 1991 and was national accounts representative of John Deere & Company from October 1991 through December 1992.

== Political career ==
In 1992, Gainer ran for State Auditor. He won the Democratic primary with 63%, defeating Mark Anthony Manchin, son of former Secretary of State and State Treasurer A. James Manchin and uncle of current U.S. Senator Joe Manchin. He was unopposed in the general election and took office in January 1993, succeeding his father, Glen Gainer, Jr., who had served in the office from 1977 to 1993. Denzil Gainer, a cousin of Glen Jr., had served as Auditor from 1961 to 1972, when he died in office.

Gainer was also unopposed in the elections of 1996 and 2000. In 2004, he was re-elected with 62% of the vote, beating Republican Lisa Thornburg. In 2008, he was re-elected with 99.94% of the vote, defeating write-in Constitution Party candidate Robert Ingargiola, who won only 295 votes to Gainer's 525,084. In 2012, he faced a strong challenge from State Delegate Larry V. Faircloth, but he was comfortably re-elected with 57% of the vote.

In November 2013, Gainer announced that he was running for the United States House of Representatives in West Virginia's 1st congressional district against Republican incumbent David McKinley in the 2014 elections. His father ran for the same district in 1982, finishing third in the Democratic primary. Gainer, outraised and outspent by McKinley, ran a "grassroots campaign", emphasising the need for consensus and bipartisanship in Congress. In endorsing him, The Charleston Gazette praised his bipartisan efforts and noted his effectiveness in the Auditor's office, particularly his saving $145 million a year through "p-cards" that simplify small-scale state purchases. In the general election, McKinley defeated Gainer by a roughly two-to-one margin.

In December 2015, Gainer announced that he would not be running for re-election to a seventh term in 2016. He said that 24 years as Auditor was long enough and he didn't want to become "stagnant" in the office. Gainer said that he would pursue work in the private sector after leaving office in January 2017. In April 2016, he announced he would resign in May, before the end of his term, to accept a job with a nonprofit group, which was later announced as being President and CEO of the National White Collar Crime Center, beginning May 15. Gainer had previously served as the group's board chairman for 18 years. Gainer was succeeded as Auditor by Lisa Hopkins, who had worked for the Auditor's office since 1999 and had served as general counsel and deputy commissioner of securities since 2001. She was appointed by Governor Earl Ray Tomblin on May 13 and she took office 2 days later.

== Electoral history ==
West Virginia Auditor Democratic Primary Election, 1992
Party	Candidate	Votes	%
Democratic	Glen Gainer, III	179,303	62.60
Democratic	Mark Anthony Manchin	107,052	37.40

West Virginia Auditor Election, 1992
Party	Candidate	Votes	%
Democratic	Glen Gainer, III	454,654	100.00

West Virginia Auditor Election, 1996
Party	Candidate	Votes	%
Democratic	Glen Gainer, III (inc.)	438,621	100.00

West Virginia Auditor Election, 2000
Party	Candidate	Votes	%
Democratic	Glen Gainer, III (inc.)	484,534	100.00

West Virginia Auditor Election, 2004
Party	Candidate	Votes	%
Democratic	Glen Gainer, III (inc.)	428,177	61.57
Republican	Lisa Thornburg	267,644	38.50

West Virginia Auditor Election, 2008
Party	Candidate	Votes	%
Democratic	Glen Gainer, III (inc.)	525,084	100.00

West Virginia Auditor Election, 2012
Party	Candidate	Votes	%
Democratic	Glen Gainer, III (inc.)	355,610	57.40
Republican	Larry Faircloth	263,959	42.60

West Virginia 1st Congressional District Election, 2014
Party	Candidate	Votes	%
Republican	David McKinley (inc.)	92,491	63.96
Democratic	Glen Gainer, III	52,109	36.04

Party political offices
Preceded by Glen Gainer Jr.	Democratic nominee for West Virginia State Auditor; 1992, 1996, 2000, 2004, 2008, 2012	Succeeded by Mark Hunt
Political offices
Preceded by Glen Gainer Jr.	Auditor of West Virginia; 1993–2016	Succeeded by Lisa Hopkins; Acting
