= 1984 West Virginia State Auditor election =

- November 6, 1984
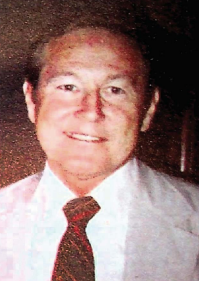

Nominee	Glen Gainer Jr.	William D. Bone
Party	Democratic	Republican
Popular vote	443,473	214,413
Percentage	67.41%	32.59%
- County results Gainer: 50–60% 60–70% 70–80% 80–90% Bone: 50–60% 60–70%
State Auditor before election
Glen Gainer Jr.
Democratic
Elected State Auditor
Glen Gainer Jr.
Democratic

The 1984 West Virginia State Auditor election took place on November 6, 1984, to elect the West Virginia State Auditor.

Incumbent Democratic State Auditor Glen Gainer Jr. won re-election to a third term, defeating Republican nominee and Certified Public Accountant William David Bone, 67.4% to 32.6%

== Democratic primary ==
=== Candidates ===
==== Nominee ====
- Glen Gainer Jr., incumbent State Auditor.

==== Eliminated in primary ====
- J. Dempsey Gibson, Kanawha County Assessor.

=== Results ===
1984 Democratic primary
Party	Candidate	Votes	%
Democratic	Glen Gainer Jr. (incumbent)	243,503	76.12%
Democratic	J. Dempsey Gibson	76,410	23.88%
Total votes		319,913	100.00%

== Republican primary ==
=== Candidates ===
==== Nominee ====
- William David Bone, Certified Public Accountant.

=== Results ===
1984 Republican primary
Party	Candidate	Votes	%
Republican	William D. Bone	103,690	100.00%
Total votes		103,690	100.00%

== General election ==
=== Results ===
1984 West Virginia State Auditor election
Party	Candidate	Votes	%
Democratic	Glen Gainer Jr. (incumbent)	443,473	67.41%
Republican	William D. Bone	214,413	32.59%
Total votes		657,886	100.00%
Democratic hold			
