= 1988 West Virginia State Auditor election =

1988 US state auditor election

- November 8, 1988
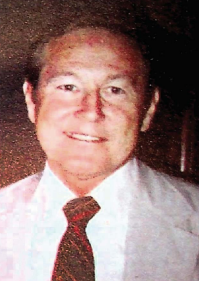

Nominee	Glen Gainer Jr.	Nelson B. Robinson
Party	Democratic	Republican
Popular vote	376,345	199,312
Percentage	65.38%	34.62%
- County results Gainer: 50–60% 60–70% 70–80% 80–90% Robinson: 50–60% 60–70%
State Auditor before election
Glen Gainer Jr.
Democratic
Elected State Auditor
Glen Gainer Jr.
Democratic

The 1988 West Virginia State Auditor election took place on November 8, 1988, to elect the West Virginia State Auditor.

Incumbent Democratic State Auditor Glen Gainer Jr. won re-election to a fourth term, defeating Republican nominee and Worker's Compensation Commissioner Nelson B. Robinson Jr., 65.38% to 34.62%

== Democratic primary ==
=== Candidates ===
==== Nominee ====
- Glen Gainer Jr., incumbent State Auditor.

==== Eliminated in primary ====
- Phillip Lee "Denzil" Gainer, Mayor of Lewisburg and son of former State Auditor Denzil Gainer. (Note: Different sources have had varying statements regarding whether Philip Gainer's father, Denzil Gainer, was related to the Glen Gainer family.)

=== Polling ===
Poll source	Date(s) administered	Sample size	Margin of error	Glen Gainer	Philip Gainer	Undecided
West Virginia Poll	April 13 - 18, 1988	500 (V)	± 3.8%	57%	9%	34%

=== Results ===
May 10, 1988 Democratic primary
Party	Candidate	Votes	%
Democratic	Glen Gainer Jr. (incumbent)	194,987	67.79%
Democratic	Denzil Gainer (Note: Although it wasn't technically his real name, Gainer was given permission by the Secretary of State's office to use his deceased father's name. Gainer himself stated, "I thought it would clear up who I am.")	92,644	32.21%
Total votes		287,631	100.00%

== Republican primary ==
=== Candidates ===
==== Nominee ====
- Nelson B. Robinson Jr., Worker's Compensation Commissioner.

=== Results ===
May 10, 1988 Republican primary
Party	Candidate	Votes	%
Republican	Nelson B. Robinson	103,747	100.00%
Total votes		103,747	100.00%

== General election ==
=== Results ===
1988 West Virginia State Auditor election
Party	Candidate	Votes	%
Democratic	Glen Gainer Jr. (incumbent)	376,345	65.38%
Republican	Nelson B. Robinson	199,312	34.62%
Total votes		575,657	100.00%
Democratic hold			
