= Young-Noyes House =

Historic house in West Virginia, United States

- U.S. National Register of Historic Places
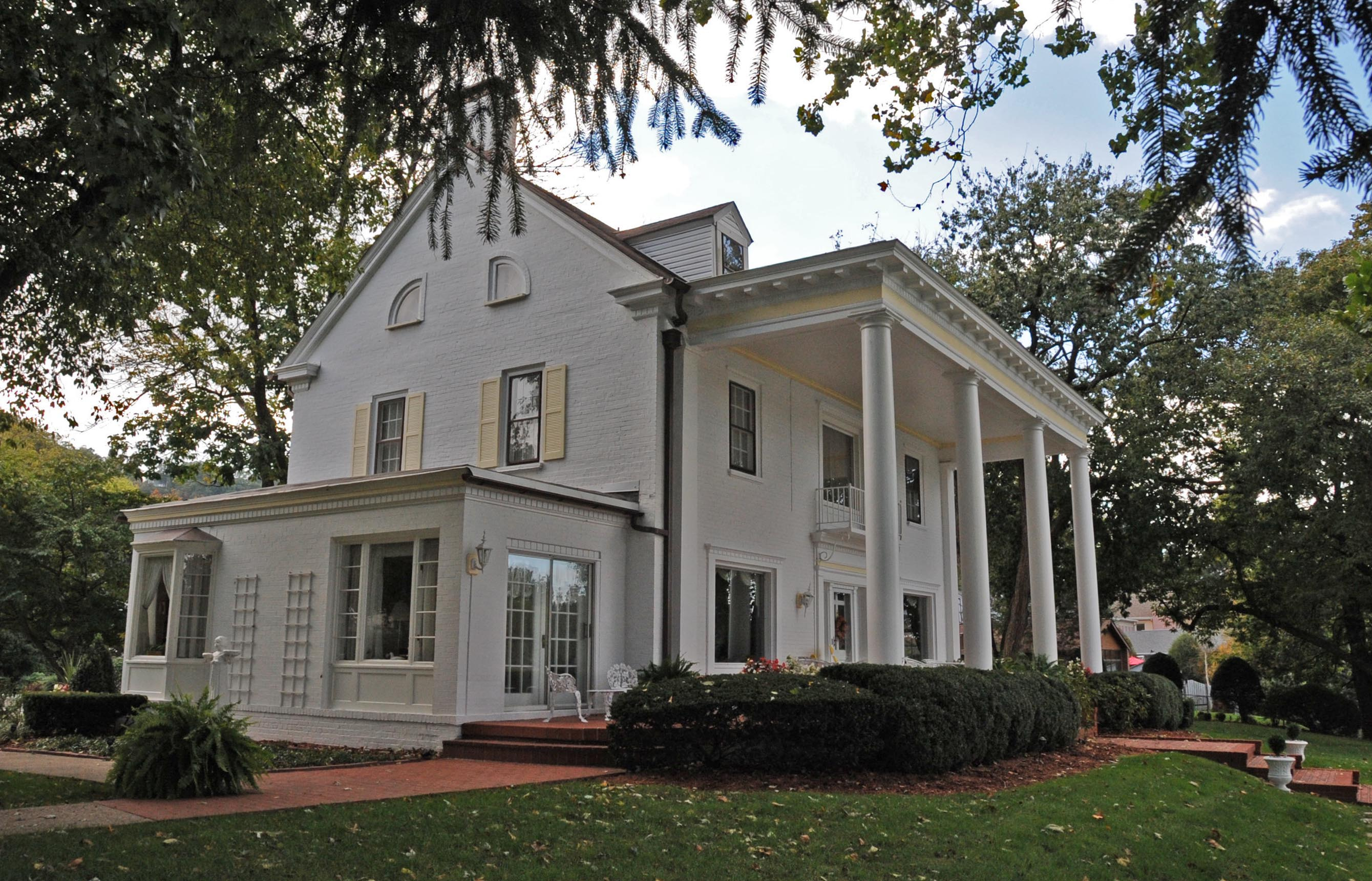

- Location within West Virginia Location within the United States
- Location: 2122 Kanawha Ave., Charleston, West Virginia
- Coordinates: 38°20′2″N 81°37′5″W
- Built: 1922
- Architect: Bengston, Ludwig Theodore
- Architectural style: Colonial Revival
- NRHP reference No.: 91000446
- Added to NRHP: April 25, 1991

Young-Noyes House, also known as the University of Charleston President's House, is a historic home located at Charleston, West Virginia. It was built in 1922 and is a white-painted 15-room brick house, featuring a central two-story gabled block and a shallow two-story gabled ell. It has a river-facing flat-roofed tetrastyle portico; the two-story smooth shaft columns are of the Doric order. The home is in the Colonial Revival style. It was purchased in 1951 to serve as the Morris Harvey College President's home.

It was listed on the National Register of Historic Places in 1978.
