= Lisa Hopkins (politician) =

American politician from West Virginia

Auditor of West Virginia
- Acting
- In office May 14, 2016 – January 16, 2017
- Governor: Earl Ray Tomblin
- Preceded by: Glen Gainer III
- Succeeded by: JB McCuskey

Personal details
- Party: Democratic
- Education: Columbia University (BA); Boston University (JD)

Lisa Hopkins is a Democratic American politician from West Virginia. She served as the interim West Virginia State Auditor during 2016 after she was appointed to the seat by Earl Ray Tomblin following the resignation of Glen Gainer. Hopkins started working in the office of the West Virginia auditor in 1999. In 2001, she became the general counsel of the office and the deputy commissioner of securities. She remained in these positions until being appointed interim auditor. The filing deadlines already passed at the time Hopkins was appointed on May 15, 2016, making her ineligible to run for election to a full term in 2016. Republican JB McCuskey won the 2016 election as auditor, becoming the first Republican auditor of West Virginia since 1976. She received her B.A. from Barnard College of Columbia University and her J.D. from the Boston University School of Law.

She previously served as president of the North American Securities Administrators Association. During her duties as President, she was interviewed regarding the GameStop stock incident. Since stepping down from her presidency, she has continued to give counsel to NASAA and the West Virginia state auditor.

Political offices
Preceded by Glen Gainer III	Auditor of West Virginia; Acting; 2016–2017	Succeeded by JB McCuskey
