= Glen Gainer Jr. =

American politician

Glen B. Gainer Jr.
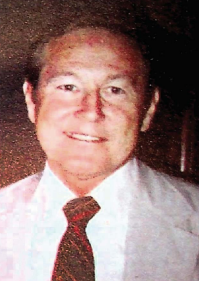

18th West Virginia State Auditor
- In office January 17, 1977 – January 13, 1993
- Governor: Jay Rockefeller; Arch A. Moore Jr. Gaston Caperton
- Preceded by: John M. Gates
- Succeeded by: Glen Gainer III

Personal details
- Born: July 4, 1927 Parkersburg, West Virginia, United States
- Died: September 8, 2009 (aged 82) Parkersburg, West Virginia, United States
- Party: Democratic
- Spouse: Sally Jo Gainer (1955–2009; his death)
- Children: Beth; John David; Glen
- Education: University of Charleston

Glen B. Gainer Jr. (July 4, 1927 – September 8, 2009) was an American politician and member of the Democratic Party who served as the 18th State Auditor of West Virginia from 1977 to 1993.

== Early life and career ==
Born in 1927 to Glen. B Gainer Sr. and Nettie Elizabeth (née Smith), Glen B. Gainer Jr. had one brother, Thomas Gainer. He married Sally Jo Padgett in 1955 and they had one daughter, Beth, and two sons, John David and Glen.

Gainer graduated from Parkersburg High School in 1945 and then from Marietta College. He served in the United States Navy during World War II and then worked as a school teacher and an athletic coach in Wood County.

== Political career ==
Gainer's first venture into politics came when he served as the mayor of Parkersburg from 1968 to 1970. He was the last Mayor to serve under the city commission form of government. As such, he had to cast tie-breaking votes.

In 1976, he ran for State Auditor. He won the Democratic primary with 49%, defeating State Delegate J. Kemp McLaughlin and future State Senator Homer Heck, who took 31% and 20%, respectively. In the general election, he defeated the incumbent State Auditor John M. Gates in a landslide, by 62% to 38%. He became the second member of his family to serve as Auditor - his cousin Denzil Gainer had served as Auditor from 1961 to 1972, when he died in office.

Gainer was re-elected against Republican David Walkup in 1980 by an even larger margin, 66% to 34%.

In 1982, he ran for West Virginia's 1st congressional district. Incumbent Democratic Congressman Bob Mollohan was retiring and the seat was open. Mollohan had been grooming his son Alan to succeed him for years and he won the Democratic primary with 41% of the vote. State Senator Dan R. Tonkovich came second with 36%, Gainer came third with 14%, Barbara Trushel came fourth with 4%, former gubernatorial candidate H. John Rogers came fifth with 2% and Timmy Kearns came last with under 2%. Alan Mollohan went on to win the general election and represented the district until 2011.

Gainer ran for a third term as Auditor in 1984 and won easily, defeating Republican William D. Bone by 67% to 33%. In his bid for a fourth term in 1988, Gainer faced a primary challenge from Phillip Lee "Denzil" Gainer (no relation). Gainer defeated him by 68% to 32% and then defeated Republican Nelson B. Robinson Jr. by 65% to 35%.

Gainer did not run for re-election in 1992. He was succeeded by his son Glen Gainer III, who held the office from 1993 to 2016.

== Death ==
Gainer died on September 8, 2009. He was predeceased by his brother and his son John David. He is interred at Mount Olivet Cemetery in Parkersburg.

Party political offices
Preceded by Denzil L. Gainer	Democratic nominee for West Virginia State Auditor; 1976, 1980, 1984, 1988	Succeeded by Glen Gainer III
