= Larry V. Faircloth =

American politician (1948–2023)

Larry Faircloth

Member of the West Virginia House of Delegates from the 35th district

Personal details
- Born: 23 July 1948
- Died: 18 December 2023 (aged 75)
- Party: Republican

Larry Victor Faircloth (July 23, 1948 – December 18, 2023) was an American politician from the state of West Virginia. He served in the West Virginia House of Delegates. He was a member of the Republican Party.

== Early life and career ==
Larry Victor Faircloth was born on July 23, 1948. He graduated from Musselman High School in Inwood, West Virginia, and James Rumsey Vocational-Technical Center. He majored in business administration at Shepherd College, and opened his own realty business. Faircloth resided in Inwood. He had polio in his right leg.

== Political career ==
In 1980, Faircloth ran for the seat in the 35th district of the West Virginia House of Delegates. He was elected as one of three delegates from the 35th district, which included Berkeley and Morgan counties in the eastern panhandle.

Faircloth was a candidate for Governor in 2004, losing the Republican nomination to Monty Warner. Faircloth ran in the 2011 special election to fill the remainder of Joe Manchin's term as Governor of West Virginia, losing the party nomination to Bill Maloney. In 2012, he opted not to run for reelection to the House of Delegates, and instead ran for West Virginia State Auditor, losing to incumbent Glen Gainer III. Faircloth had initially planned to run for the United States House of Representatives in West Virginia's 2nd congressional district in the 2014 elections but opted to run for the West Virginia Senate against senate majority leader John Unger. Unger defeated Faircloth.

== Death ==
Faircloth died on December 18, 2023, at the age of 75.

Party political offices
Vacant Title last held by Lisa Thornburg	Republican nominee for West Virginia State Auditor; 2012	Succeeded by JB McCuskey
