= Dana Lynch =

American politician

Member of the West Virginia House of Delegates from the 44th district
- In office January 12, 2013 – January 9, 2019
- Succeeded by: Caleb Hanna

Personal details
- Born: March 26, 1949 (age 77) Erbacon, West Virginia, U.S.
- Party: Democratic

Dana Lee Lynch (born March 26, 1949) is an American politician who was a Democratic member of the West Virginia House of Delegates representing District 44 from January 12, 2013 to January 9, 2019. He was defeated on November 8, 2018 by 19-year-old Caleb Hanna.

== Elections ==
- 2012 To challenge Democratic Representative Joe Talbott (who had been redistricted from District 36), Lynch ran in the three-way May 8, 2012 Democratic Primary and placed first with 1,339 votes (37.8%) ahead of Representative Talbott, and won the November 6, 2012 General election with 3,351 votes (59.9%) against Republican nominee Robert Karnes.
