= 2014 United States House of Representatives elections in West Virginia =

- November 4, 2014

All 3 West Virginia seats to the United States House of Representatives
	Majority party	Minority party
Party	Republican	Democratic
Last election	2	1
Seats won	3	0
Seat change	▲1	▼1
Popular vote	242,823	182,484
Percentage	55.26%	41.53%
Swing	▼4.65%	▲1.44%

Republican
40–50%
50–60%
60–70%
70–80%
80–90%
Democratic
40–50%
50–60%

The 2014 United States House of Representatives election in West Virginia was held on November 4, 2014, to elect the three U.S. representatives from West Virginia, one from each of the state's three congressional districts.

Republicans won control of every congressional district in West Virginia for the first time since the 61st Congress ended in 1911.

== Overview ==
United States House of Representatives elections in West Virginia, 2014
Party	Votes	Percentage	Seats	+/–
Republican	242,823	55.26%	3	+1
Democratic	182,484	41.53%	0	-1
Libertarian	7,682	1.75%	0	–
Independents	6,399	1.46%	0	–
Totals	439,388	100.00%	3	—

=== By district ===
Results of the 2014 United States House of Representatives elections in West Virginia by district:

District	Republican		Democratic		Others		Total		Result
District	Votes	%	Votes	%	Votes	%	Votes	%	Result
District 1	92,491	63.90%	52,109	36.00%	137	0.10%	144,737	100%	Republican hold
District 2	72,619	47.08%	67,687	43.88%	13,944	9.04%	154,250	100%	Republican hold
District 3	77,713	55.35%	62,688	44.65%	0	0.00%	140,401	100%	Republican gain
Total	242,823	55.26%	182,484	41.53%	14,081	3.21%	439,388	100%	

== District 1 ==
2014 West Virginia's 1st congressional district election
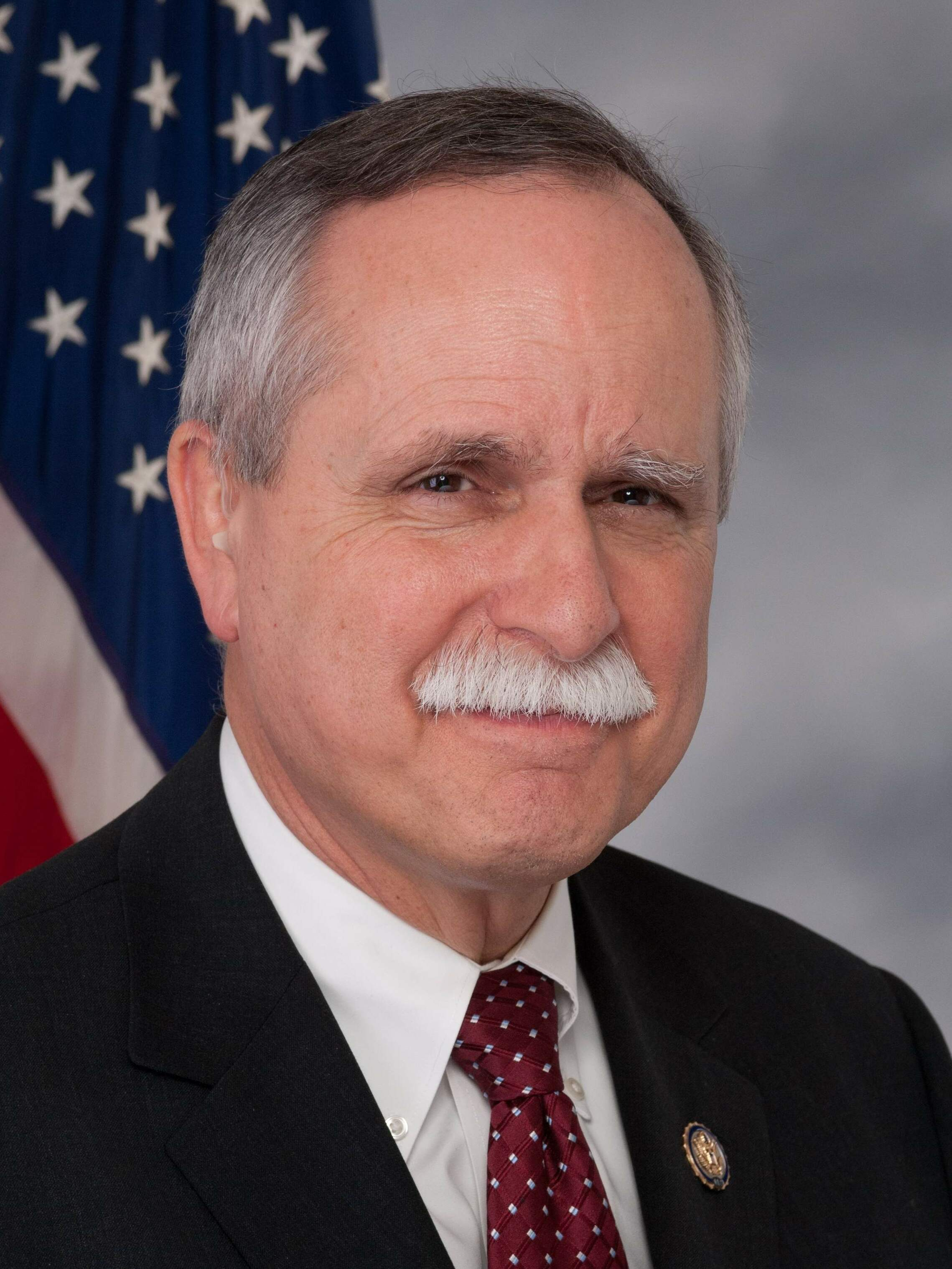

Nominee	David McKinley	Glen Gainer III
Party	Republican	Democratic
Popular vote	92,491	52,109
Percentage	64.0%	36.0%
- County results Mckinley: 50–60% 60–70% 70–80% 80–90% Gainer: 50–60%
U.S. Representative before election
David McKinley
Republican
Elected U.S. Representative
David McKinley
Republican

Incumbent Republican David McKinley, who had represented the district since 2011, ran for re-election.

=== Republican primary ===
While McKinley had expressed some interest in running for Senate, he later declared he would not run. He filed for re-election to his House seat on January 15, 2014.

==== Candidates ====
===== Nominee =====
- David McKinley, incumbent U.S. Representative

==== Results ====
Republican primary results
Party	Candidate	Votes	%
Republican	David McKinley (incumbent)	27,589	100.0

=== Democratic primary ===
==== Candidates ====
===== Nominee =====
- Glen Gainer III, State Auditor

==== Results ====
Democratic primary results
Party	Candidate	Votes	%
Democratic	Glen Gainer III	34,764	100.0

=== General election ===
==== Polling ====
Poll source	Date(s) administered	Sample size	Margin of error	David McKinley (R)	Glen Gainer (D)	Undecided
YouGov	October 16–23, 2014	276	± 10%	53%	25%	22%

==== Predictions ====
Source	Ranking	As of
The Cook Political Report	Safe R	November 3, 2014
Rothenberg	Safe R	October 24, 2014
Sabato's Crystal Ball	Safe R	October 30, 2014
RCP	Safe R	November 2, 2014
Daily Kos Elections	Safe R	November 4, 2014

==== Results ====
West Virginia's 1st congressional district, 2014
Party	Candidate	Votes	%
Republican	David McKinley (incumbent)	92,491	64.0
Democratic	Glen Gainer III	52,109	36.0
Total votes		144,600	100.0
Republican hold			

== District 2 ==
2014 West Virginia's 2nd congressional district election
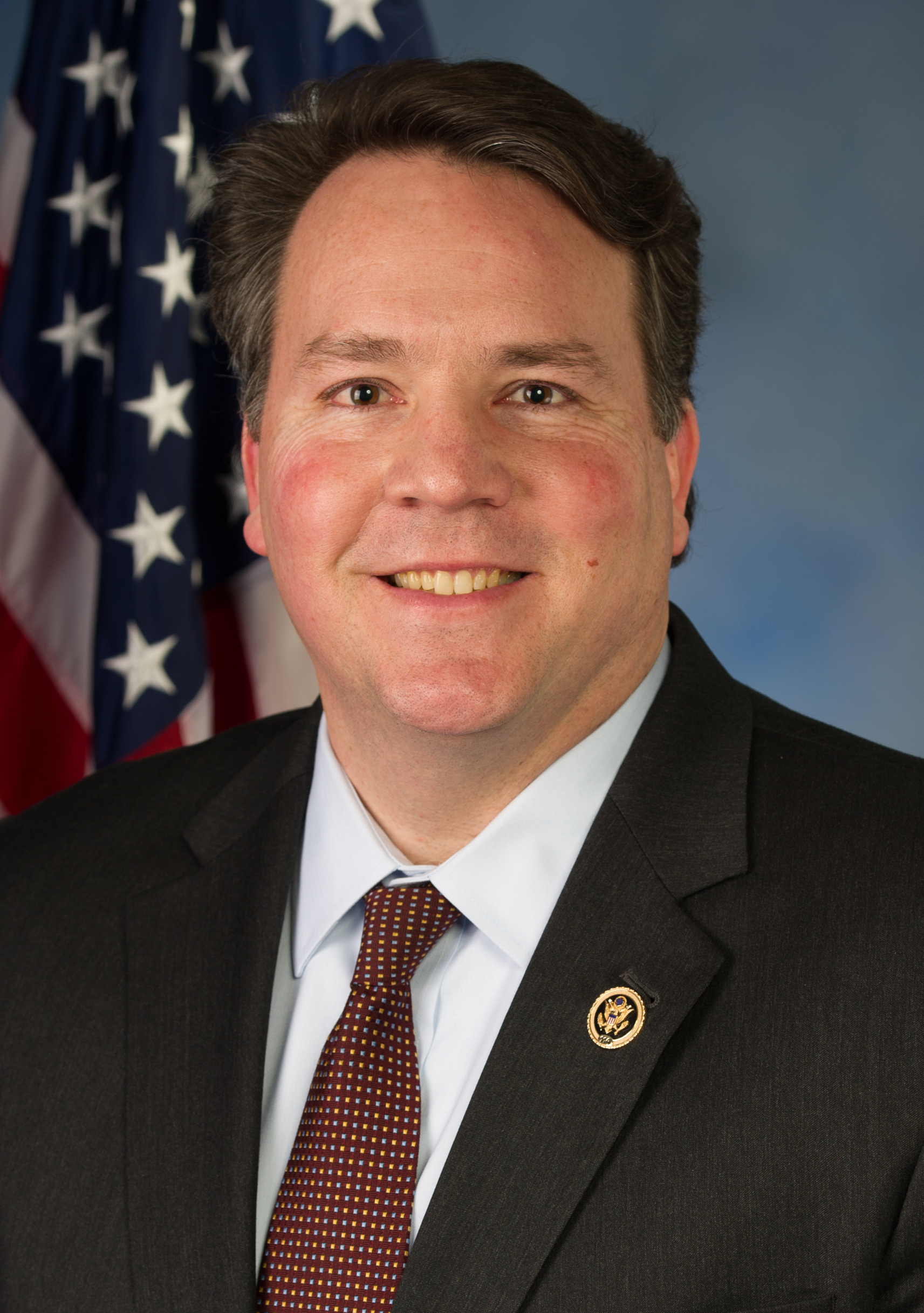

Nominee	Alex Mooney	Nick Casey	Davy Jones
Party	Republican	Democratic	Libertarian
Popular vote	72,619	67,687	7,682
Percentage	47.1%	43.9%	5.0%
- County results Mooney: 40–50% 50–60% Casey: 40–50% 50–60%
U.S. Representative before election
Shelley Moore Capito
Republican
Elected U.S. Representative
Alex Mooney
Republican

Incumbent Republican Shelley Moore Capito, who had represented the district since 2001, won her seventh term in Congress with almost 70 percent of the vote in 2012. She announced that she would not run for re-election, so that she could run for the United States Senate seat held by retiring Democrat Jay Rockefeller.

=== Republican primary ===
==== Candidates ====
===== Nominee =====
- Alex Mooney, former chairman of the Maryland Republican Party and former Maryland State Senator

===== Eliminated in primary =====
- Robert Fluharty, veteran and investigator
- Steve Harrison, state senator
- Charlotte Lane, former state delegate, former United States International Trade Commissioner and nominee for West Virginia Attorney General in 1996
- Jim Moss
- Ken Reed, pharmacy owner
- Ron Walters Jr., son of State Delegate Ron Walters

===== Declined =====
- Tim Armstead, Minority Leader of the West Virginia House of Delegates
- Shelley Moore Capito, incumbent U.S. Representative (running for the U.S. Senate)
- Larry Faircloth, former state delegate (running for the state senate)
- Betty Ireland, former Secretary of State of West Virginia
- Patrick Lane, state delegate
- Bill Maloney, businessman and nominee for governor in 2011 and 2012
- Patrick Morrisey, Attorney General of West Virginia
- Eric Nelson, state delegate
- Suzette Raines, state delegate (running for the state senate)
- Charles Trump, attorney and former state delegate

==== Results ====
Republican primary results
Party	Candidate	Votes	%
Republican	Alex Mooney	12,678	36.0
Republican	Ken Reed	7,848	22.3
Republican	Charlotte Lane	6,358	18.1
Republican	Steve Harrison	3,885	11.0
Republican	Ron Walters, Jr.	2,125	6.0
Republican	Jim Moss	1,684	4.8
Republican	Robert Fluharty	621	1.8
Total votes		35,199	100.0

=== Democratic primary ===
==== Candidates ====
===== Nominee =====
- Nick Casey, former chairman of the West Virginia Democratic Party

===== Eliminated in primary =====
- Meshea Poore, state delegate

===== Declined =====
- Matt Dunn, attorney
- Steven Gower
- Doug Skaff, state delegate
- Herb Snyder, state senator
- Rod Snyder, president of the Young Democrats of America
- Erik Wells, state senator

==== Results ====
Democratic primary results
Party	Candidate	Votes	%
Democratic	Nick Casey	21,646	60.6
Democratic	Meshea Poore	14,061	39.4
Total votes		35,707	100.0

=== General election ===
==== Polling ====
Poll source	Date(s) administered	Sample size	Margin of error	Alex Mooney (R)	Nick Casey (D)	Other	Undecided
YouGov	October 16–23, 2014	348	± 7%	45%	44%	–	11%
Public Opinion Strategies*	August 10–12, 2014	400	± 4.9%	40%	28%	13%	19%
Tarrance Group (R-Mooney)	May 20–22, 2014	400	± 4.9%	43%	31%	15%	11%

==== Predictions ====
Source	Ranking	As of
The Cook Political Report	Tossup	November 3, 2014
Rothenberg	Tilt R	October 24, 2014
Sabato's Crystal Ball	Lean R	October 30, 2014
RCP	Tossup	November 2, 2014
Daily Kos Elections	Lean R	November 4, 2014

==== Results ====
West Virginia's 2nd congressional district, 2014
Party	Candidate	Votes	%
Republican	Alex X. Mooney	72,619	47.1
Democratic	Nick Casey	67,687	43.9
Libertarian	Davy Jones	7,682	5.0
Independent	Ed Rabel	6,250	4.0
Total votes		154,238	100.0
Republican hold			

== District 3 ==
2014 West Virginia's 3rd congressional district election
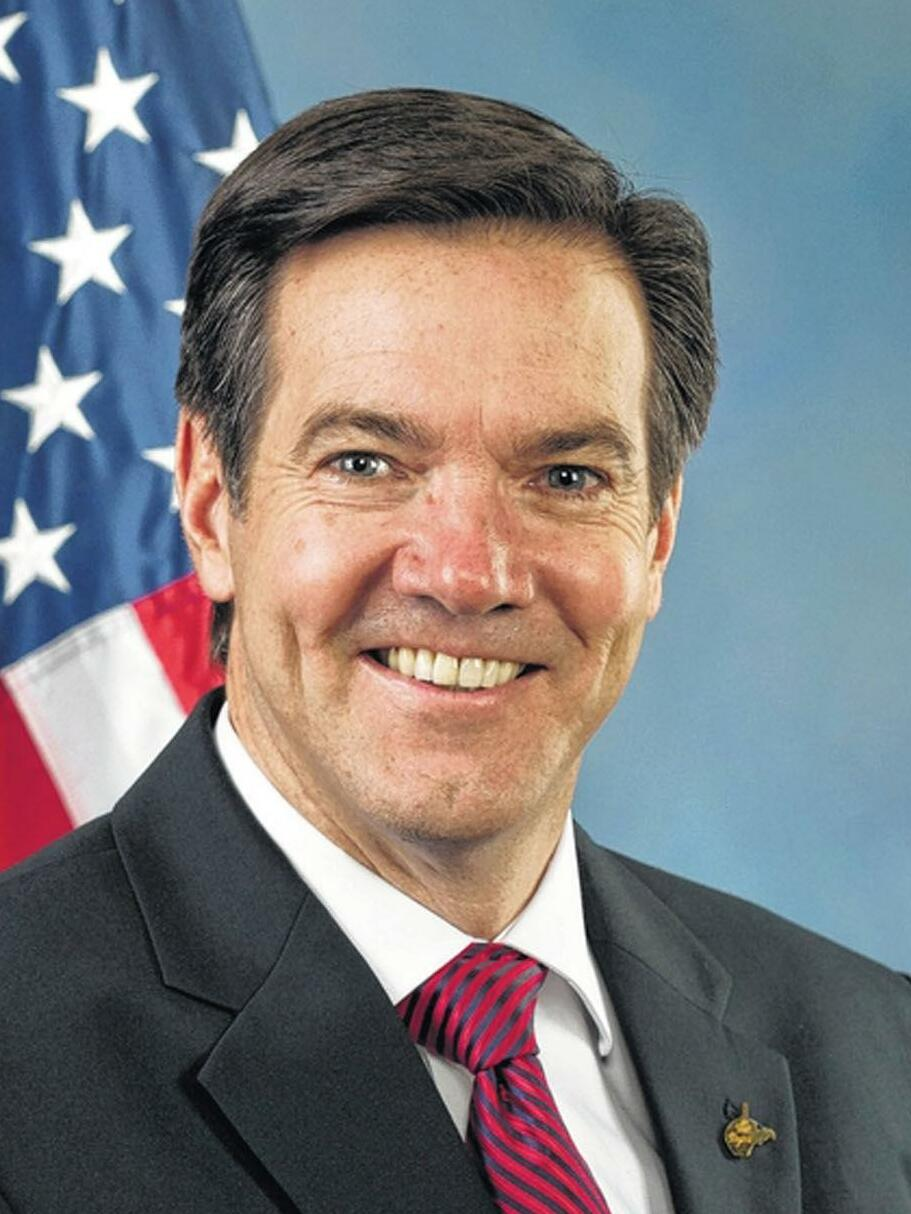

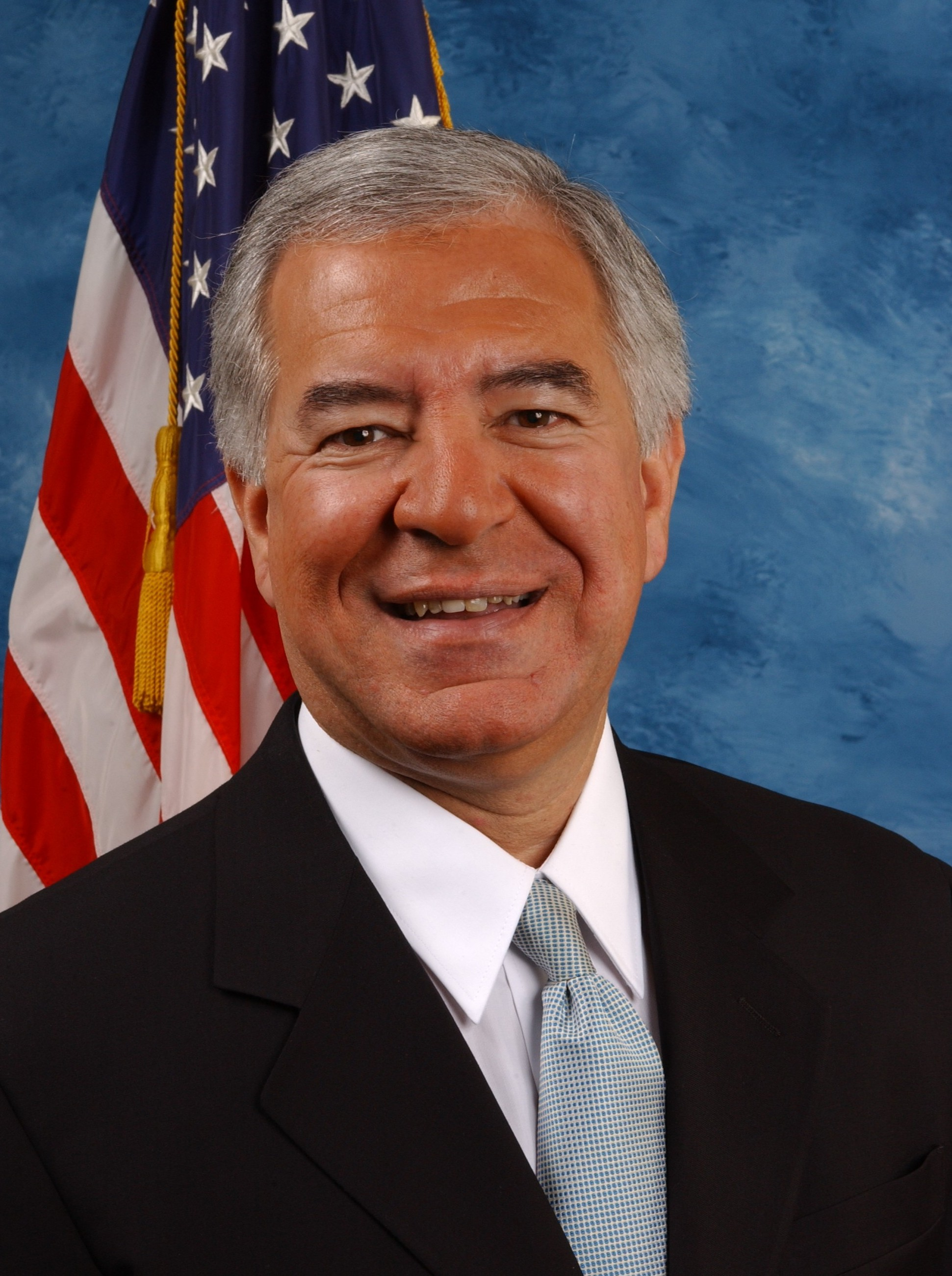
Nominee	Evan Jenkins	Nick Rahall
Party	Republican	Democratic
Popular vote	77,713	62,688
Percentage	55.3%	44.7%
- County results Jenkins: 50–60% 60–70% Rahall: 50–60%
U.S. Representative before election
Nick Rahall
Democratic
Elected U.S. Representative
Evan Jenkins
Republican

Incumbent Democrat Nick Rahall, who had represented the district since 1977, ran for re-election after having considered running for the Senate.

=== Democratic primary ===
==== Candidates ====
===== Nominee =====
- Nick Rahall, incumbent U.S. Representative

===== Eliminated in primary =====
- Richard Ojeda, veteran

==== Results ====
Democratic primary results
Party	Candidate	Votes	%
Democratic	Nick Rahall (incumbent)	37,176	66.4
Democratic	Richard Ojeda	18,767	33.6
Total votes		55,943	100.0

=== Republican primary ===
For the Republicans, State Senator Evan Jenkins, who switched parties in July 2013, ran for the seat against Rahall. On switching parties, Jenkins stated that: "West Virginia is under attack from Barack Obama and a Democratic Party that our parents and grandparents would not recognize." In 2012, West Virginia's 3rd district went for Mitt Romney 66% to 32%.

State Senator Bill Cole, who had considered a run for the seat himself, was Jenkins' campaign chairman.

==== Candidates ====
===== Nominee =====
- Evan Jenkins, state senator

===== Declined =====
- Bill Cole, state senator
- Rick Snuffer, state delegate and nominee for this seat in 2004 & 2012

==== Results ====
Jenkins ran unopposed in the Republican primary.

Republican primary results
Party	Candidate	Votes	%
Republican	Evan Jenkins	14,374	100.0

=== General election ===
==== Campaign ====
Rahall was considered one of the most "endangered" House Democrats by the House Democratic campaign committee.

Jenkins supported the repeal of Obamacare and pledged to replace it.

As of September 18, 2014, the race was rated a "toss up" by both University of Virginia political professor Larry Sabato, of Sabato's Crystal Ball, and Stu Rothenberg of the Rothenberg Political Report. As of October 2, managing editor Kyle Kondik of Sabato's Crystal Ball said the race was still a toss-up, calling it "Super close, super expensive and super nasty."

A Fox News op-ed opined in October that Jenkins "offers Republicans the most credible nominee the party has had since the mid-'90s. In a race that will see as much advertising by third-party organizations as any House race in the country, the winner will be the candidate who voters believe will do the most to take on President Obama's War on Coal and the EPA."

Through October 6, 2014, 16,340 ads had appeared on broadcast television, the second-highest number of ads of any district in the U.S. By mid-October 2014, it was anticipated that $12.8 million could be spent on ads in the race by Election Day. Rahall outspent Jenkins in the election by a two-to-one ratio.

Time listed a Rahall ad in its article: "Here Are 5 of The Most Dishonest Political Ads of 2014," and The Washington Post ran an article regarding the same Rahall ad entitled: "A sleazy attack puts words in the other candidate's mouth".

==== Endorsements ====
Rahall was endorsed by the NRA Political Victory Fund.

The National Right to Life Committee, West Virginia Chamber of Commerce, and West Virginians for Life, all of which had previously supported Rahall, supported Jenkins in 2014, and the West Virginia Coal Association endorsed Jenkins in September 2014.

==== Polling ====
Poll source	Date(s) administered	Sample size	Margin of error	Nick Rahall (D)	Evan Jenkins (R)	Undecided
YouGov	October 16–23, 2014	253	± 10%	45%	50%	5%
Harper Polling	October 7–8, 2014	657	± 3.82%	44%	50%	6%
Garin-Hart-Yang Research	May 26–28, 2014	403	± 5%	52%	39%	9%
Anzalone Liszt Grove Research (D-Rahall)	May 12–14, 2014	502	± 4.4%	52%	39%	9%
DFM Research	April 22–27, 2014	400	± 4.9%	48%	39%	13%
Garin-Hart-Yang Research	April 15–16, 2014	400	± 5%	52%	40%	8%
Tarrance Group (R-Jenkins)	March 3–5, 2014	405	± 4.9%	40%	54%	6%
Harper Polling (R-Jenkins)	October 7–8, 2013	649	± 3.84%	46%	42%	12%

==== Predictions ====
Source	Ranking	As of
The Cook Political Report	Tossup	November 3, 2014
Rothenberg	Tossup	October 24, 2014
Sabato's Crystal Ball	Lean R (flip)	October 30, 2014
RCP	Tossup	November 2, 2014
Daily Kos Elections	Tilt R (flip)	November 4, 2014

==== Results ====
Jenkins won the election, defeating incumbent Rahall in November 2014 with 55.3% of the vote to Rahall's 44.7%.

West Virginia's 3rd congressional district, 2014
Party	Candidate	Votes	%
Republican	Evan Jenkins	77,713	55.3
Democratic	Nick Rahall (incumbent)	62,688	44.7
Total votes		140,401	100.0
Republican gain from Democratic			

== See also ==
- 2014 United States House of Representatives elections
- 2014 United States elections
