= University of Charleston =

Private university in Charleston, West Virginia, U.S.

Coordinates: 38°19′59″N 81°36′59″W

- Former names: Barboursville Seminary of the Southern Methodist Church (1888–1901); Morris Harvey College (1901–1978)
- Type: Private university
- Established: September 12, 1888; 138 years ago
- Accreditation: Higher Learning Commission
- Endowment: $56.9 million (2023)
- President: Dr. Martin S. Roth
- Provost: Dr. Daniel K. Silber
- Students: 3,032 (fall 2025)
- Undergraduates: 2,338 (fall 2024)
- Postgraduates: 713 (fall 2024)
- Location: Charleston, West Virginia, United States
- Campus: Urban
- Other campuses: Beckley
- Newspaper: The Eagle
- Colors: Maroon & gold
- Nickname: Golden Eagles
- Sporting affiliations: NCAA Division II • MEC • EIVA
- Website: www.ucwv.edu
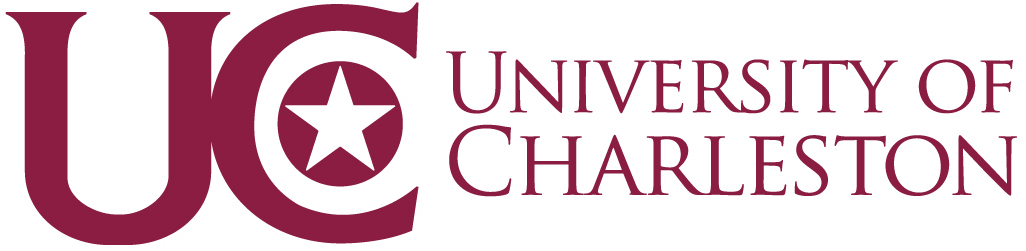

The University of Charleston (UC) is a private university in Charleston, West Virginia, United States. Founded in 1888, it also has a satellite campus in Beckley, West Virginia. The university enrolled approximately 3,000 students as of fall 2025.

== History ==
The school was founded in 1888 as the Barboursville Seminary of the Southern Methodist Church. In 1901, it was renamed Morris Harvey College, in honor of a devoted supporter.

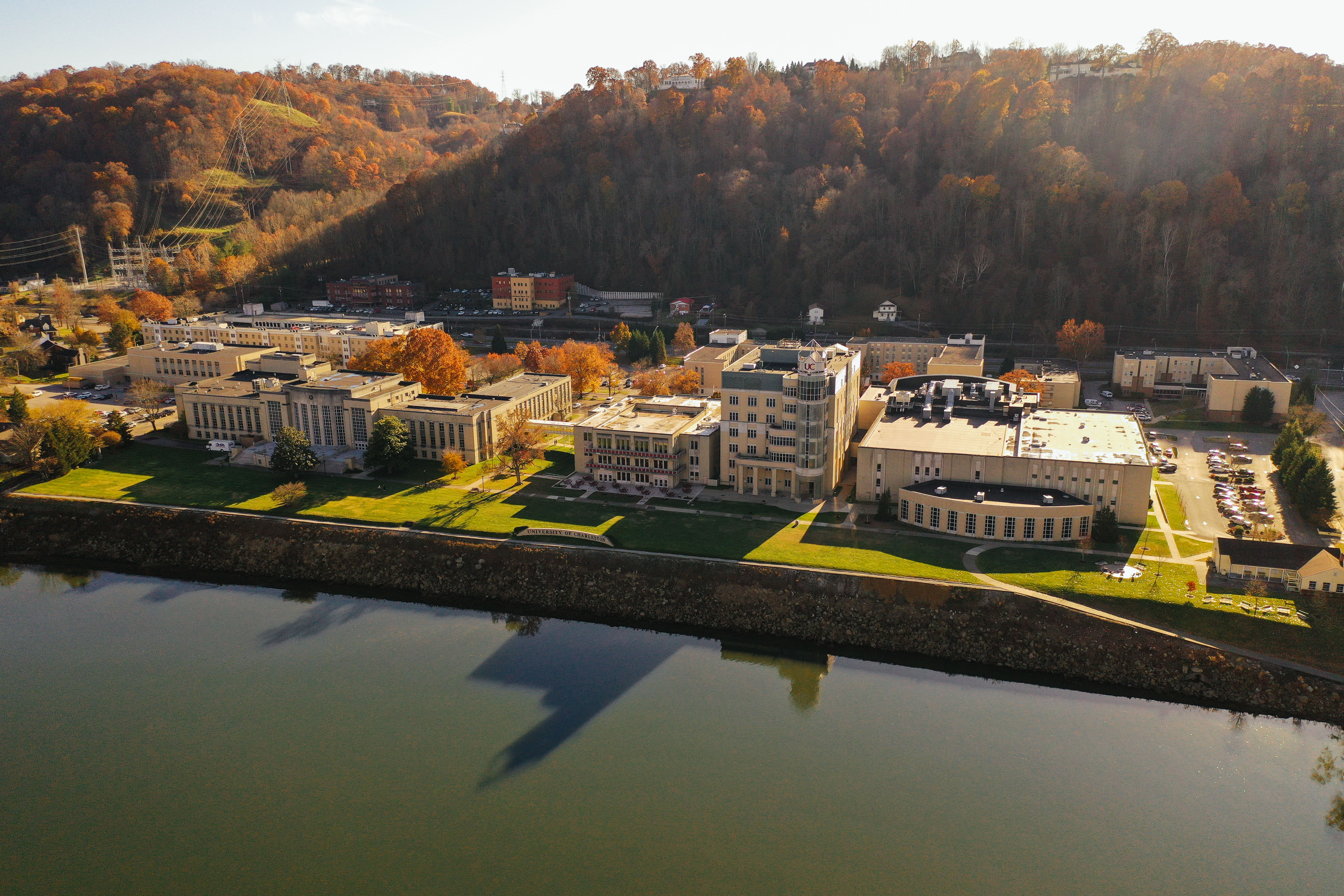
The University of Charleston from across the Kanawha River

In 1935 the school moved to downtown Charleston and affiliated with the Mason College of Fine Arts and Music. In 1940, it became independent of the Methodist Church. In 1947, the school moved to its present campus in the Kanawha City section of Charleston across the river from the State Capitol. In 1951, it purchased the Young-Noyes House as the home of the college president. It was listed on the National Register of Historic Places in 1978.

The college fell on hard times after the end of the military draft and college deferment during the Vietnam War and offered itself to the state in 1975, which refused the gift. In December 1978, the school changed its name to the University of Charleston. Beginning with the inauguration of President Dr. Edwin H. Welch in 1989, the school has undergone a physical and academic transformation. Four new residence halls, a parking garage, a fitness center, an academic building housing the library, computer and science labs, and a new school of pharmacy have been built since 1998.

UC established campuses on Mountain State University's former Beckley and Martinsburg, West Virginia, locations on January 1, 2013. UC later vacated the former MSU Martinsburg campus (the property was sold to a third-party buyer, and established a new location in Martinsburg, known as UC-Martinsburg. UC vacated the former MSU Beckley campus after the 2014–15 academic year and established a new campus in Beckley.

On December 15, 2017, the board of trustees named Martin S. Roth to succeed Dr. Edwin Welch as the president of the university. He began on June 30, 2018. Roth left his position as the dean of the business school at the University of Hartford.

== Academics ==
The University of Charleston is accredited by the Higher Learning Commission.

There are over twenty undergraduate major programs at UC, including fields such as business, communications, education, nursing, exercise science, organizational leadership, sport administration, radiologic science, and digital media design.

=== Graduate schools ===
In 2006, UC opened its first doctoral program, the UC School of Pharmacy. UC now also offers an online doctoral program through its School of Leadership, the Doctor of Executive Leadership (DEL). In 2008, the university opened a graduate business school which grants four business master's degrees: Master of Business Administration and Leadership (MBAL), Executive Master of Business Administration (EMBA), Executive Master of Business Administration with a concentration in Pharmaceutical & Healthcare Management (EMBA- PHM), and Executive Master of Forensic Accounting (EMFA).

In 2012, the school announced a new Physician Assistant program.

== Athletics ==
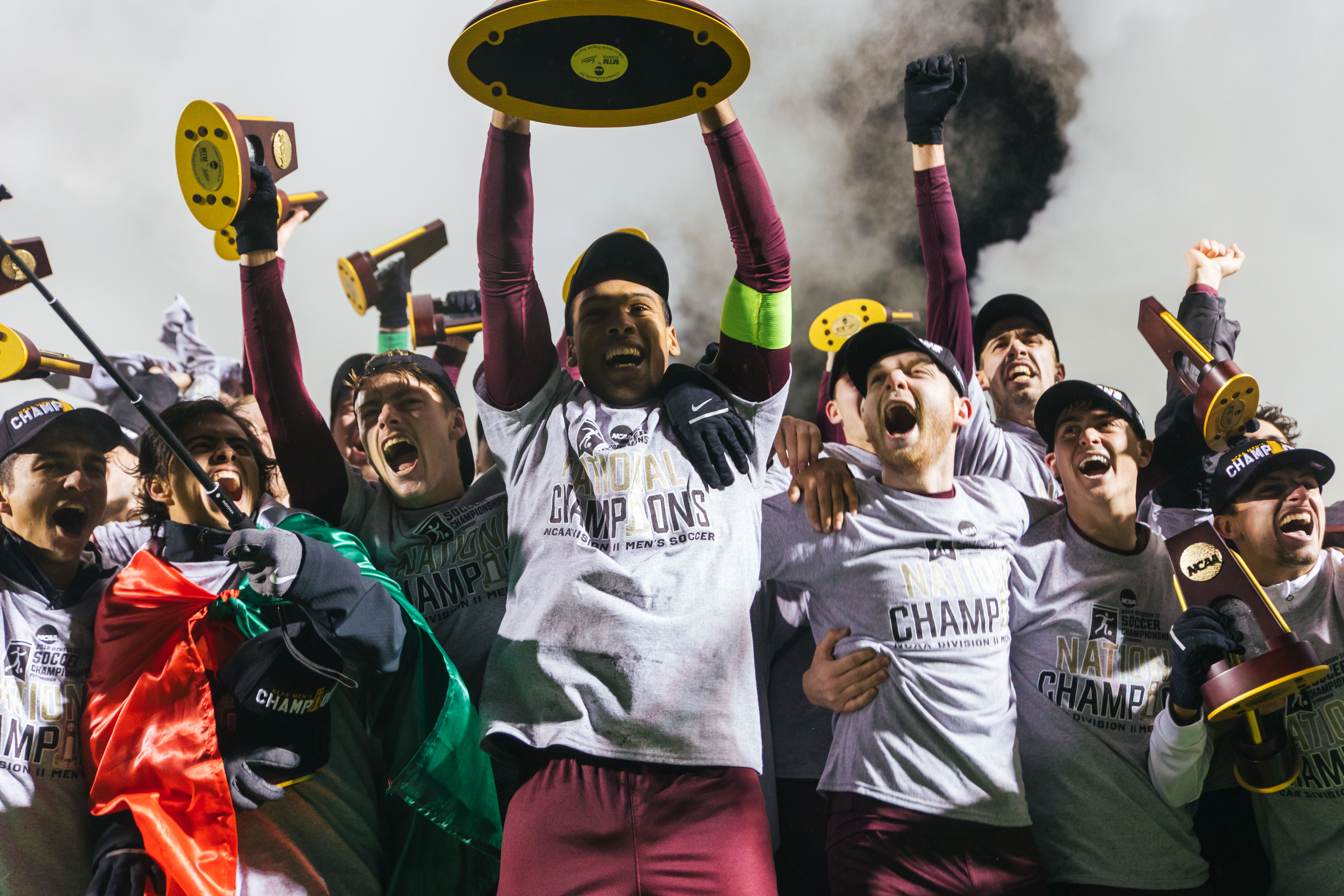
The University of Charleston men's soccer team celebrating its second national championship in three years.

UC's athletic teams, known as the Golden Eagles, mostly compete in the Mountain East Conference (MEC) in NCAA Division II. In June 2012, UC was one of nine members of the West Virginia Intercollegiate Athletic Conference (WVIAC) that announced their plans to leave to form a new Division II conference. Two months later, the new conference was unveiled as the MEC, with UC as one of 12 charter members. The men's volleyball team, which was elevated from a club team to full varsity status for the 2015 season (2014–15 school year), plays at the National Collegiate (Division I/II) level; after playing in 2015 as an independent, it joined the Eastern Intercollegiate Volleyball Association. The University of Charleston achieved its first Division II national championship in men's soccer in 2017, defeating Lynn University in the finals, and won the national championship again in 2019, defeating Cal State LA 3–1 in the final.

In 2005, UC entered into a partnership with the local school board to refurbish the school board–owned Laidley Field, which was renamed University of Charleston Stadium. The campus also boasts new or renovated softball, football, baseball, and soccer fields, and competes in 18 Division II sports.

== Notable alumni ==
- Tim Armstead, Chief Justice of the Supreme Court of Appeals of West Virginia and former Speaker of the West Virginia House of Delegates
- Bill Bolling, former Lieutenant Governor of Virginia
- Lynn Bria, current head women's basketball coach at Stetson University
- Nathan Brown, former member of the West Virginia House of Delegates
- Robert Byrd, United States Senator
- John Cominsky, former NFL player with the Atlanta Falcons and Detroit Lions
- Jim Harrick, national championship–winning head coach with the UCLA Bruins and Naismith College Coach of the Year (1995)
- Trenton Barnhart, member of the West Virginia House of Delegates
- Mark Hunt, current West Virginia State Auditor, and former member of the West Virginia House of Delegates and West Virginia Senate
- Cynthia Rylant, award-winning author of more than 100 children's books, including Missing May and A Fine White Dust.
