= 2024 West Virginia Attorney General election =

- November 5, 2024
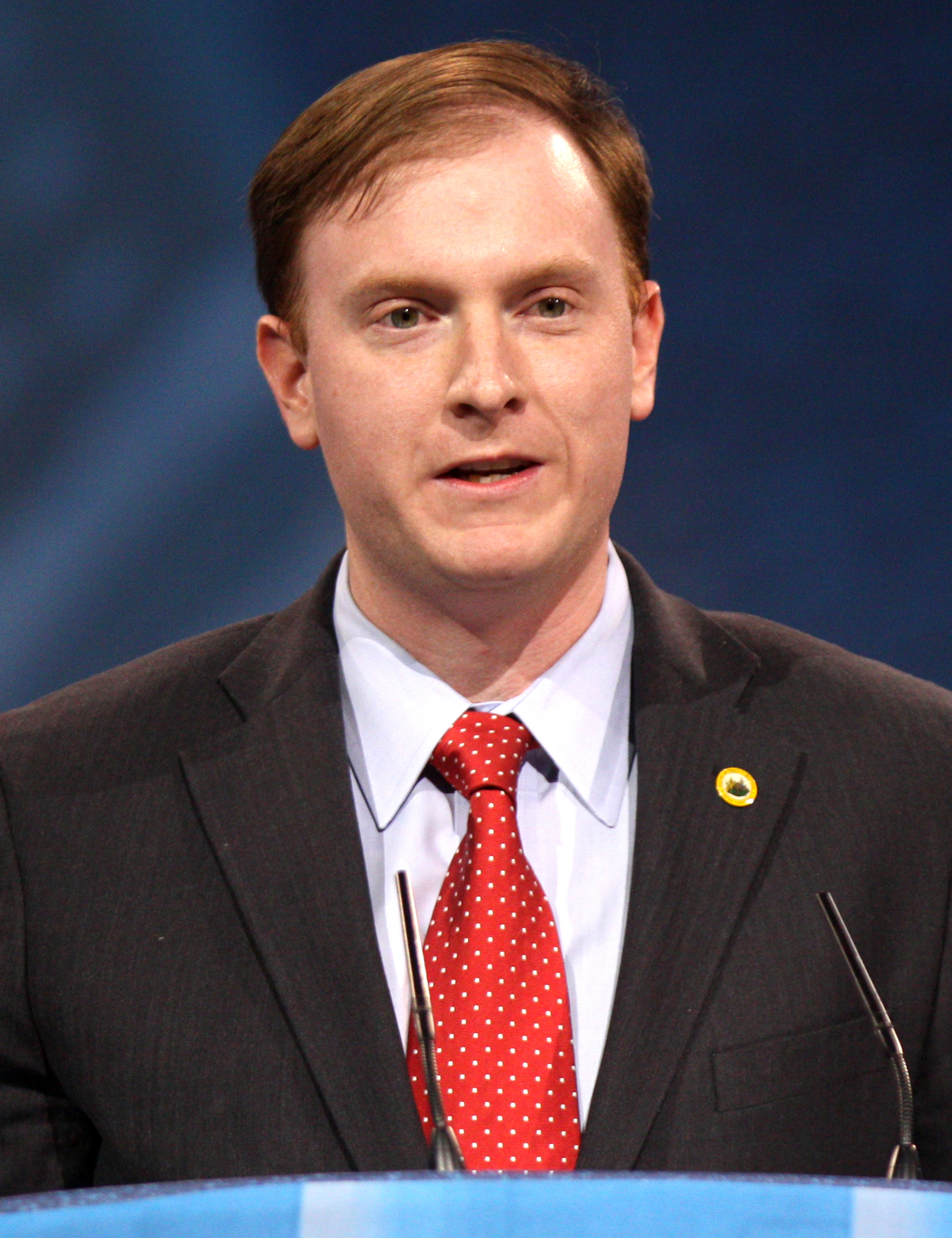

Nominee	JB McCuskey	Teresa Toriseva
Party	Republican	Democratic
Popular vote	501,452	214,654
Percentage	70.02%	29.98%
- McCuskey: 50–60% 60–70% 70–80% 80–90%
Attorney General before election
Patrick Morrisey
Republican
Elected Attorney General
JB McCuskey
Republican

The 2024 West Virginia Attorney General election was held on November 5, 2024, to elect the next attorney general of West Virginia, concurrently with the 2024 U.S. presidential election, as well as various state and local elections, including for U.S. Senate, U.S. House, and governor of West Virginia. Incumbent Republican Attorney General Patrick Morrisey was eligible to run for re-election to a fourth term but decided instead to run for governor. Republican state auditor JB McCuskey defeated Democratic attorney Teresa Toriseva with 70.02% of the vote.

== Republican primary ==
=== Candidates ===
==== Nominee ====
- JB McCuskey, West Virginia State Auditor (2017–2025)

==== Eliminated in primary ====
- Michael B. Stuart, state senator from the 7th district (2022–present)

==== Withdrawn ====
- Ryan Weld, state senator from the 1st district (2016–present) (ran for re-election)

==== Declined ====
- Patrick Morrisey, incumbent attorney general (2013–2025) (ran for governor)

==== Endorsements ====
JB McCuskey

Organizations

- West Virginia Chamber of Commerce
Michael B. Stuart

U.S. Executive branch officials

- Matthew Whitaker, former acting U.S. Attorney General (2018–2019)

Organizations

- West Virginia Coal Association

=== Polling ===
Poll source	Date(s) administered	Sample size (Note: Key: A – all adults RV – registered voters LV – likely voters V – unclear)	Margin of error	JB McCuskey	Michael Stuart	Ryan Weld	Other	Undecided
	November 22, 2023	Ryan Weld withdraws from the race						
American Pulse Research & Polling (R) (Note: Poll commissioned by WMOV.)	November 13–14, 2023	414 (LV)	± 4.8%	16%	11%	5%	–	68%
Orion Strategies (Note: Poll commissioned by the West Virginia Chamber of Commerce)	June 17–20, 2023	651 (LV)	± 6.0%	–	20%	14%	16% (Note: "Another candidate" with 16%)	50%

=== Results ===
Results by county: McCuskey: 50–60%; 60–70%; 70–80%; Stuart: 50–60%

Republican primary results
Party	Candidate	Votes	%
Republican	JB McCuskey	117,263	59.83%
Republican	Michael Stuart	78,745	40.17%
Total votes		196,008	100.00%

== Democratic primary ==
=== Candidates ===
==== Nominee ====
- Teresa Toriseva, attorney

==== Eliminated in primary ====
- Richie Robb, former mayor of South Charleston, candidate for U.S. Senate in 2020 and Republican candidate for the Supreme Court of Appeals in 1996.

=== Results ===
Results by county: Toriseva: 50–60%; 60–70%; 70–80%; 80–90%; Robb: 50–60%; 60–70%; 70–80%; 80–90%

Democratic primary results
Party	Candidate	Votes	%
Democratic	Teresa Toriseva	50,480	52.67%
Democratic	Richie Robb	45,356	47.33%
Total votes		95,836	100.00%

== General election ==
Source	Ranking	As of
Sabato's Crystal Ball	Safe R	July 25, 2024

=== Results ===
2024 West Virginia Attorney General election
Party	Candidate	Votes	%	±%
Republican	JB McCuskey	501,452	70.02%	+6.25
Democratic	Teresa Toriseva	214,654	29.98%	−6.25
Total votes		716,106	100.00%	N/A
Republican hold				

==== By county ====
County	JB McCuskey Republican		Teresa Toriseva Democratic		Margin		Total
County	#	%	#	%	#	%	Total
Barbour	4,788	79.53%	1,232	20.47%	3,556	59.07%	6,020
Berkeley	36,072	67.41%	17,439	32.59%	18,633	34.82%	53,511
Boone	5,799	76.74%	1,758	23.26%	4,041	53.47%	7,557
Braxton	3,610	73.20%	1,322	26.80%	2,288	46.39%	4,932
Brooke	5,700	62.11%	3,477	37.89%	2,223	24.22%	9,177
Cabell	20,444	61.89%	12,589	38.11%	7,855	23.78%	33,033
Calhoun	2,010	77.52%	583	22.48%	1,427	55.03%	2,593
Clay	2,327	78.14%	651	21.86%	1,676	56.28%	2,978
Doddridge	2,413	85.96%	394	14.04%	2,019	71.93%	2,807
Fayette	10,290	70.45%	4,316	29.55%	5,974	40.90%	14,606
Gilmer	1,648	75.18%	544	24.82%	1,104	50.36%	2,192
Grant	4,438	88.76%	562	11.24%	3,876	77.52%	5,000
Greenbrier	10,129	71.36%	4,066	28.64%	6,063	42.71%	14,195
Hampshire	7,931	80.49%	1,922	19.51%	6,009	60.99%	9,853
Hancock	8,178	66.41%	4,136	33.59%	4,042	32.82%	12,314
Hardy	4,667	77.27%	1,373	22.73%	3,294	54.54%	6,040
Harrison	20,609	73.04%	7,606	26.96%	13,003	46.09%	28,215
Jackson	9,530	77.86%	2,710	22.14%	6,820	55.72%	12,240
Jefferson	16,228	58.20%	11,653	41.80%	4,575	16.41%	27,881
Kanawha	45,144	63.62%	25,810	36.38%	19,334	27.25%	70,954
Lewis	5,346	79.01%	1,420	20.99%	3,926	58.03%	6,766
Lincoln	5,300	79.96%	1,328	20.04%	3,972	59.93%	6,628
Logan	8,109	81.42%	1,850	18.58%	6,259	62.85%	9,959
Marion	15,039	64.13%	8,410	35.87%	6,629	28.27%	23,449
Marshall	7,760	60.71%	5,023	39.29%	2,737	21.41%	12,783
Mason	7,617	76.48%	2,343	23.52%	5,274	52.95%	9,960
McDowell	3,504	76.72%	1,063	23.28%	2,441	53.45%	4,567
Mercer	17,269	77.94%	4,887	22.06%	12,382	55.89%	22,156
Mineral	9,921	80.03%	2,476	19.97%	7,445	60.05%	12,397
Mingo	6,260	84.39%	1,158	15.61%	5,102	68.78%	7,418
Monongalia	20,797	52.73%	18,642	47.27%	2,155	5.46%	39,439
Monroe	4,863	80.39%	1,186	19.61%	3,677	60.79%	6,049
Morgan	6,537	76.70%	1,986	23.30%	4,551	53.40%	8,523
Nicholas	7,327	78.38%	2,021	21.62%	5,306	56.76%	9,348
Ohio	9,642	53.29%	8,451	46.71%	1,191	6.58%	18,093
Pendleton	2,434	78.24%	677	21.76%	1,757	56.48%	3,111
Pleasants	2,395	76.57%	733	23.43%	1,662	53.13%	3,128
Pocahontas	2,627	73.24%	960	26.76%	1,667	46.47%	3,587
Preston	10,329	76.51%	3,171	23.49%	7,158	53.02%	13,500
Putnam	19,448	75.09%	6,450	24.91%	12,998	50.19%	25,898
Raleigh	21,988	76.63%	6,705	23.37%	15,283	53.26%	28,693
Randolph	7,776	71.56%	3,090	28.44%	4,686	43.13%	10,866
Ritchie	3,126	84.40%	578	15.60%	2,548	68.79%	3,704
Roane	4,023	77.20%	1,188	22.80%	2,835	54.40%	5,211
Summers	3,599	74.42%	1,237	25.58%	2,362	48.84%	4,836
Taylor	5,271	75.50%	1,710	24.50%	3,561	51.01%	6,981
Tucker	2,402	71.19%	972	28.81%	1,430	42.38%	3,374
Tyler	2,593	75.36%	848	24.64%	1,745	50.71%	3,441
Upshur	7,260	77.93%	2,056	22.07%	5,204	55.86%	9,316
Wayne	10,457	74.22%	3,633	25.78%	6,824	48.43%	14,090
Webster	2,174	79.84%	549	20.16%	1,625	59.68%	2,723
Wetzel	3,784	65.71%	1,975	34.29%	1,809	31.41%	5,759
Wirt	1,888	79.70%	481	20.30%	1,407	59.39%	2,369
Wood	24,971	71.16%	10,121	28.84%	14,850	42.32%	35,092
Wyoming	5,661	83.32%	1,133	16.68%	4,528	66.65%	6,794
Totals	501,452	70.02%	214,654	29.98%	286,798	40.05%	716,106

Counties that flipped from Democratic to Republican

- Monongalia (largest city: Morgantown)

==== By congressional district ====
McCuskey won both congressional districts.

District	McCuskey	Toriseva	Representative
1st	72%	28%	Carol Miller
2nd	68%	32%	Alex Mooney (118th Congress)
2nd	68%	32%	Riley Moore (119th Congress)

== Notes ==
Partisan clients
