= Mark Hunt (politician) =

American politician (born 1960)

Auditor of West Virginia
- Incumbent
- Assumed office January 13, 2025
- Governor: Patrick Morrisey
- Preceded by: JB McCuskey

Member of the West Virginia Senate from the 8th district
- In office December 1, 2022 – January 13, 2025 Serving with Glenn Jeffries
- Preceded by: Richard Lindsay
- Succeeded by: T. Kevan Bartlett

Member of the West Virginia House of Delegates
- In office December 1, 2004 – December 1, 2014
- Preceded by: Ann Calvert; Dan Foster
- Succeeded by: Larry Rowe; Brad White
- Constituency: 30th district (2004–2012); 36th district (2012–2014)
- In office December 1, 1994 – December 1, 2000
- Preceded by: Nelson Sorah
- Succeeded by: Carrie Webster
- Constituency: 31st district

Personal details
- Born: Mark Allen Hunt; January 23, 1960 (age 66) Charleston, West Virginia, U.S.
- Party: Democratic (before 2022); Republican (2022–present)
- Education: University of Charleston (BA); Marshall University (MA); University of the District of Columbia (JD)
- Website: Campaign website

Mark Allen Hunt (born January 23, 1960, in Charleston, West Virginia) is an American politician and attorney serving as the West Virginia State Auditor since 2025. A member of the Republican Party, he served in the West Virginia Senate from 2022 to 2025, representing the 8th district.

From 2012 to 2014, Hunt was a Democratic member of the West Virginia House of Delegates representing District 36 from 2012 to 2014. Hunt served consecutively from January 2009 until January 2013, and non-consecutively from January 1995 until January 2001 and from January 2005 until January 2007 in District 30 and District 31 seats. Hunt was a candidate for West Virginia Senate in 2000 and a candidate for the United States House of Representatives for West Virginia's 2nd congressional district in 2006. In 2024, Hunt was elected West Virginia State Auditor.

== Life and career ==
Hunt was born in Charleston, West Virginia, and spent weekends and summers with his grandparents in Belle, located in eastern Kanawha County. He graduated from Stonewall Jackson High School in 1979. From 1984 to 1990, prior to attending law school, Hunt served as a staff member for the West Virginia Legislature.

=== Education ===
Hunt earned his BA in political science and education from the University of Charleston in 1982. He went on to receive his MA in public administration from Marshall University in 1984. He later earned his JD from the David A. Clarke School of Law at the University of the District of Columbia in 1994.

=== Legal practice ===
After graduating from law school, Hunt worked as counsel to then–West Virginia State Auditor Glen Gainer. In late 1994, he established his own law practice, initially as managing partner of Hunt & Serreno PLLC, and later as Mark A. Hunt & Associates PLLC. He has practiced law for over 30 years.

=== Cloning project ===
In 2000–2001, Hunt worked with Brigitte Boisselier, a chemist and bishop of the Raëlian movement, to fund a human cloning laboratory for Boisselier's company Clonaid in Nitro, West Virginia; contemporaneous ABC News reporting quoted Hunt saying the effort was motivated by his desire to clone his deceased 10‑month‑old son. ABC News and Congressional Research Service reports note that the Food and Drug Administration inspected the facility in 2001 and it closed soon afterward; AP coverage in 2016 referenced the episode in connection with Hunt’s later political campaign.

== Federal theft charges ==
On November 16, 2026, Hunt was indicted by a federal grand jury on charges of theft and bank fraud, alongside three other individuals.

U.S. Attorney Moore Capito said that Hunt was charged with conspiring to steal multiple properties to benefit his friend's business via improper issuances of tax deeds.

== Elections ==
- 1994 Hunt was initially elected in the District 31 Democratic primary and the November 8, 1994, general election, and re-elected in the November 5, 1996, general election.
- 1998 Hunt was challenged in the three-way 1998 Democratic primary, but won, and won the November 3, 1998, general election against Libertarian candidate John Sturgeon.
- 2000 To challenge Senate District 8 incumbent Republican Senator Vic Sprouse, Hunt ran in the 2000 Democratic primary and won, but lost the November 7, 2000, general election to Senator Sprouse, who held the seat from 1997 until 2009.
- 2004 April 30 his third son Jackie Lee Hunt was born. When District 30 Representative Foster ran for West Virginia Senate and left a district seat open, Hunt placed in the fourteen-way 2004 Democratic primary and was elected in the fourteen-way seven-position November 2, 2004, general election which re-elected incumbents Jon Amores (D), Bonnie Brown (D), and Bobbie Hatfield (D), and nominees Corey Palumbo (D), Sharon Spencer (D), Danny Wells (D), and unseated Representative Calvert (R).
- 2006 To challenge West Virginia's 2nd Congressional District incumbent Republican United States Representative Shelley Moore Capito, Hunt ran in the 2006 Democratic primary but lost to Mike Callaghan; Congresswoman Capito was re-elected in the November 7, 2006, general election.
- 2008 When Representative Palumbo ran for West Virginia Senate and Representative Amores retired, leaving two district seats open, Hunt placed fifth in the seventeen-way May 13, 2008, Democratic primary with 10,512 votes (8.5%), and placed fifth in the fifteen-way seven-position November 4, 2008, general election with 21,635 votes (8.0%) behind Democratic nominee Doug Skaff and incumbent Representatives Wells, Brown (D), and Hatfield (D), and ahead of incumbents Spencer (D) and Guthrie (D), all seven Republican nominees and Mountain Party candidate John Welbourn.
- 2010 Hunt placed sixth in the thirteen-way May 11, 2010, Democratic primary with 5,158 votes (10.0%), and placed sixth in the fourteen-way seven-position November 2, 2010, general election with 17,197 votes (7.8%) behind incumbent Representative Skaff (D), Republican nominee Eric Nelson, incumbents Wells (S), Hatfield (D), and Brown (D), and ahead of and incumbent Guthrie(D), unseated Representative Spencer (D) and the remaining Republican nominees.
- 2012 Redistricted to District 36 with fellow District 30 incumbent Representatives Nancy Guthrie and Danny Wells, Hunt placed second in the seven-way May 8, 2012, Democratic primary with 2,834 votes (20.4%), and placed first in the six-way three-position November 6, 2012, general election with 9,325 votes (19.7%) ahead of Representatives Wells (D) and Guthrie (D) and Republican nominees Robin Holstein, Stevie Thaxton, and Steve Sweeney.
- 2016 In 2016, Hunt ran as a Democrat for the U.S. House of Representatives in West Virginia's 2nd congressional district. He won the Democratic primary but was defeated in the general election by incumbent Republican Alex Mooney.
- 2022 Hunt was elected to the West Virginia State Senate representing the 8th district in 2022 as a Republican. He won the Republican primary on May 10, 2022, against Joshua Higginbotham and Mark Mitchem. In the general election on November 8, 2022, Hunt defeated incumbent Democrat Richard Lindsay with 56.8% of the vote.
- 2024 In 2024, Mark Hunt ran as a Republican candidate for West Virginia State Auditor. He won the primary on May 14, 2024, defeating Eric Householder, Tricia Jackson, and Caleb Hanna. In the general election held on November 5, 2024, Hunt defeated Democratic nominee Mary Ann Claytor with 70.0% of the vote.

== Personal life ==
Hunt is a member of Grace Bible Church in Charleston and Maple Hill Baptist Church in Campbells Creek. He is affiliated with several fraternal organizations, Moose, and Tau Kappa Epsilon (TKE).

Hunt has been married to Tracy Conard Hunt for over 27 years. Tracy serves as Chair of the Marshall University Autism Training Board. The couple has three sons: Andrew, Mark Jr., and Jackie.

Party political offices
Preceded by JB McCuskey	Republican nominee for Auditor of West Virginia; 2024	Most recent
Political offices
Preceded by JB McCuskey	Auditor of West Virginia; 2025–present	Incumbent
