= JB McCuskey =

American politician (born 1981)

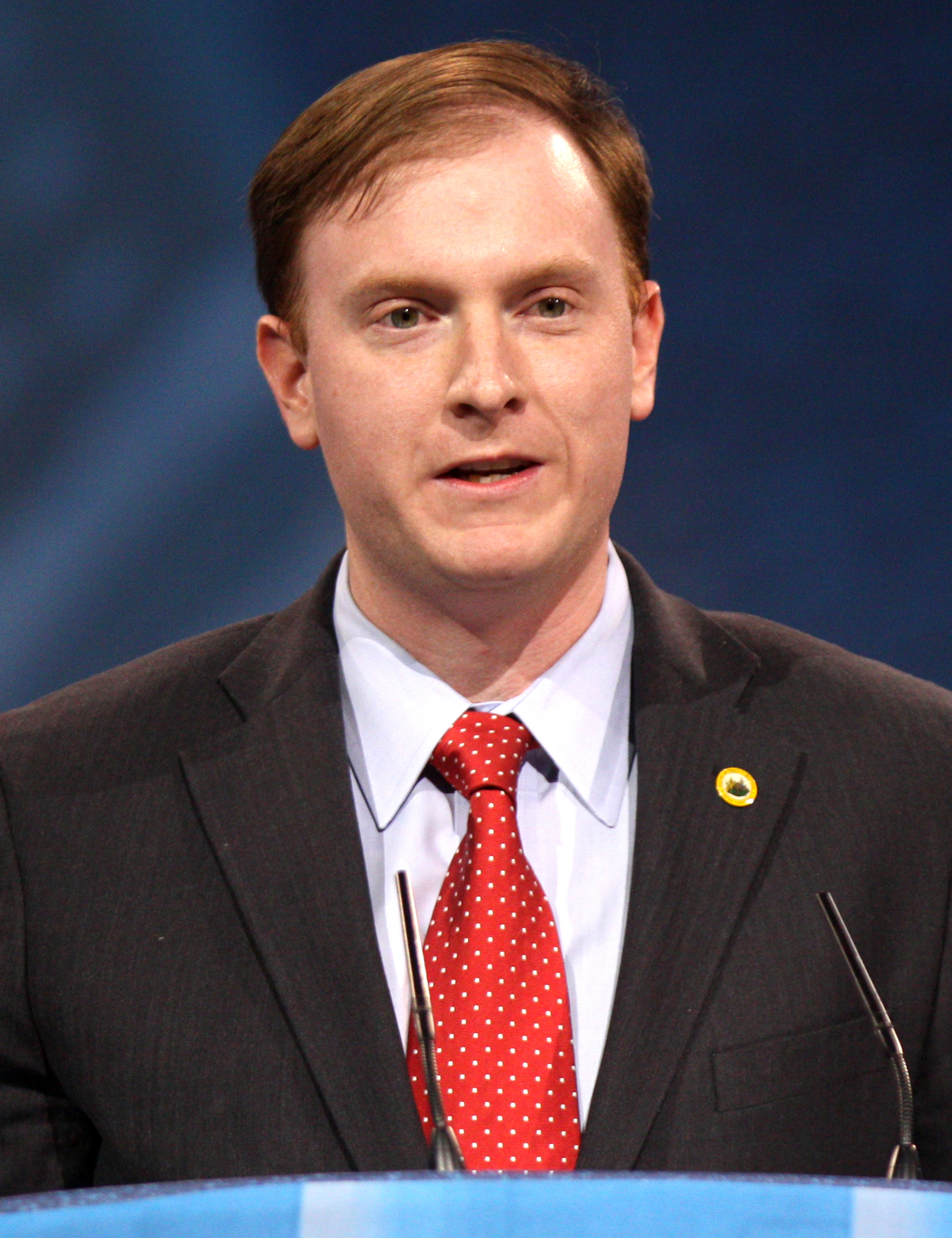
- McCuskey in 2013

35th Attorney General of West Virginia
- Incumbent
- Assumed office January 13, 2025
- Governor: Patrick Morrisey
- Preceded by: Patrick Morrisey

Auditor of West Virginia
- In office January 16, 2017 – January 13, 2025
- Governor: Jim Justice
- Preceded by: Lisa Hopkins (acting)
- Succeeded by: Mark Hunt

Member of the West Virginia House of Delegates from the 35th district
- In office January 12, 2013 – January 16, 2017
- Preceded by: Pete Sigler
- Succeeded by: Andrew Byrd

Personal details
- Born: John Bohen McCuskey; 1981 (age 44–45) Clarksburg, West Virginia, U.S.
- Party: Republican
- Spouse: Wendy McCuskey
- Children: 2
- Parent: John F. McCuskey (father)
- Education: George Washington University (BA); West Virginia University (JD)
- Website: Campaign website

John Bohen McCuskey (born 1981) is an American lawyer and politician who is serving as the 35th attorney general of West Virginia since 2025. As a Republican, he has previously served as the West Virginia State Auditor from 2017 to 2025. He also was a member of the West Virginia House of Delegates representing District 35 from 2013 to 2017. On February 28, 2023, he announced he would run for governor of West Virginia to attempt to succeed term limited governor Jim Justice. However, in July 2023 he announced that he would run for attorney general instead.

McCuskey was elected West Virginia's 35th attorney general in 2024, winning over 70% of the vote to defeat Democrat Teresa Toriseva.

== Education ==
McCuskey earned a Bachelor of Arts in political communication from George Washington University and a Juris Doctor from the West Virginia University College of Law.

== Elections ==
- 2012 With the redistricting of District 35, which is represented by four delegates, McCuskey was among ten candidates in the May 8, 2012 Republican Primary and placed third with 1,969 votes (18.2%). He placed fourth out of eight candidates in the November 6, 2012 General election by 41 votes with 11,325 votes (12.0%), behind incumbent Democratic Representative Doug Skaff, fellow Republican selectees Suzette Raines and Eric Nelson, and losers incumbent Democratic Representatives Bobbie Hatfield and Bonnie Brown, Democratic nominee Chris Morris, and fellow Republican nominee Fred Joseph.
- 2014 McCuskey was reelected to the House.
- 2016 McCuskey defeated Mary Ann Claytor with 58% of the vote for State Auditor.

Party political offices
Preceded by Larry V. Faircloth	Republican nominee for Auditor of West Virginia; 2016, 2020	Succeeded by Mark Hunt
Preceded by Patrick Morrisey	Republican nominee for Attorney General of West Virginia; 2024	Most recent
Political offices
Preceded by Lisa Hopkins; Acting	Auditor of West Virginia; 2017–2025	Succeeded by Mark Hunt
Legal offices
Preceded by Patrick Morrisey	Attorney General of West Virginia; 2025–present	Incumbent
