= Caleb Hanna =

American politician (born 1999)

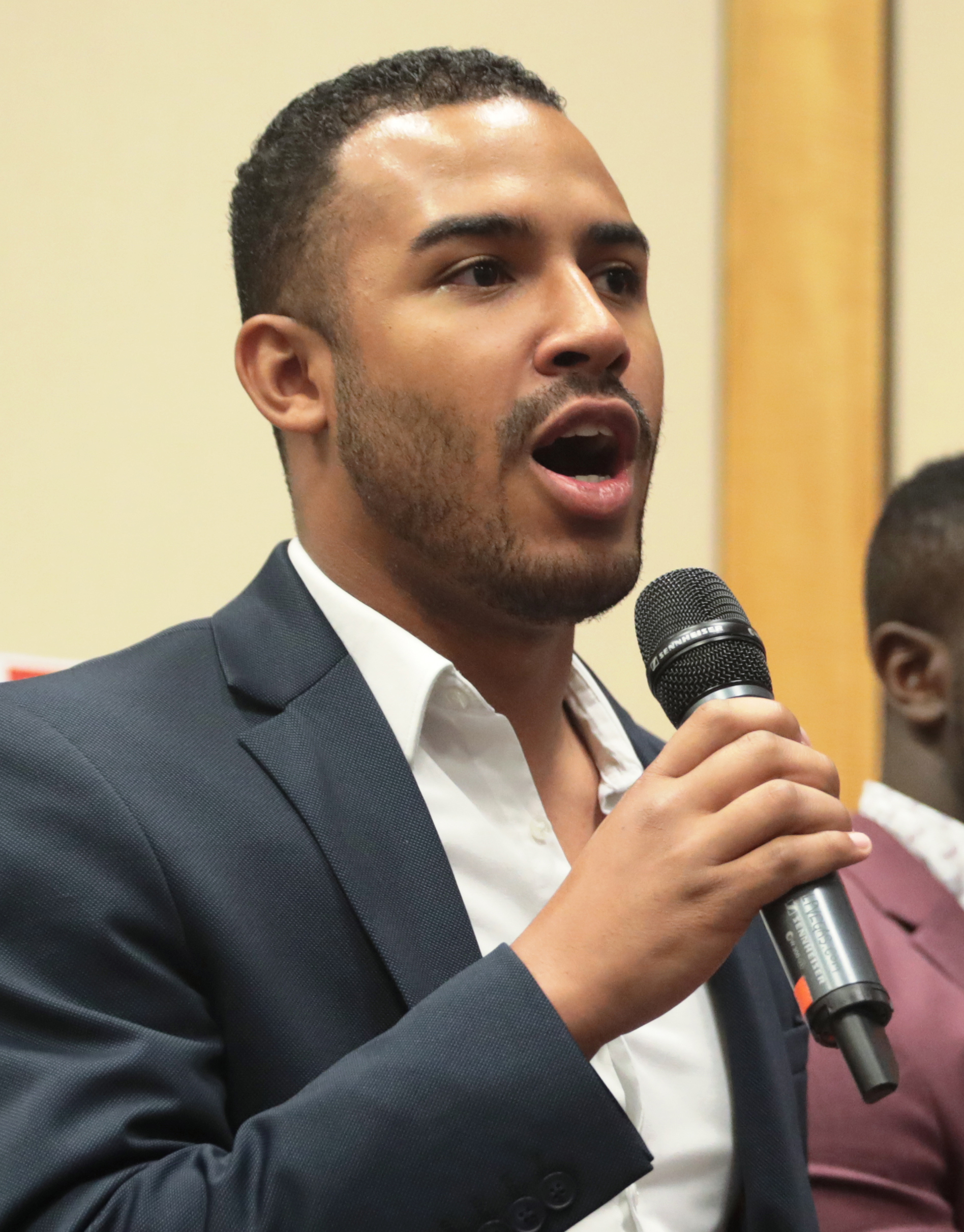

Member of the West Virginia House of Delegates
- In office December 1, 2018 – January 2, 2024
- Preceded by: Dana Lynch
- Succeeded by: Tom Clark
- Constituency: 48th district (2022–2024); 44th district (2018–2022)

Personal details
- Born: October 29, 1999 (age 26) Summersville, West Virginia
- Party: Republican
- Education: West Virginia State University

Caleb Hanna (born October 29, 1999) is an American politician who served as a member of the West Virginia House of Delegates, from 2018 to 2024. Hanna was elected to the office on November 6, 2018, defeating incumbent Dana Lynch. Caleb Hanna lives in Nicholas County, West Virginia.

== Career ==
Hanna was first elected to public office in 2018 at 19 years old and was the youngest African-American ever elected to a state office in United States History. He attended West Virginia State University as a full-time student and earned his B.A. in economics.

Hanna served as the Assistant Majority Whip, Chair of the Select Committee on Minority Issues and the Vice Chair of a Select Committee on Prevention and Treatment of Substance Abuse, and a member of the Education, Economic Development, Industry and Labor, Jails & Prisons, and Senior, Children, and Family Issues committee.

While in office Hanna co-founded RunGenZ, a 501(c)(4) non profit that recruited and trained young candidates to run for public office at any level. RunGenZ was eventually acquired by the American Legislative Exchange Council.

After defeat in the primary of the 2024 West Virginia State Auditors race, Hanna went on to become Deputy State Auditor and Deputy Chief of Staff to the newly elected Auditor Mark Hunt.

== Electoral history ==
2022 West Virginia House of Delegates 48th District General Election
Party	Candidate	Votes	%	±%
Republican	Caleb Hanna	2,886	70.8	
Democratic	Eric Sebert	1,193	29.2	
Total votes		4,079	100%	

2020 West Virginia House of Delegates 44th District General Election
Party	Candidate	Votes	%	±%
Republican	Caleb Hanna	4,332	63.9	
Democratic	Robin Cutlip	2,445	36.1	
Total votes		6,777	100%	

2018 West Virginia House 44th District Republican Primary Election
Party	Candidate	Votes	%
Republican	Caleb Hanna	1,004	72.9
Republican	Elijah Karnes	374	27.1
Total votes		1,378	100%

2018 West Virginia House of Delegates 44th district General Election
Party	Candidate	Votes	%	±%
Republican	Caleb Hanna	3,041	60.3%	+19.9
Democratic	Dana Lynch	1,798	35.7%	−16.4
Mountain	Barbara Daniels	203	4.0%	−3.6
Total votes		5,042	100%	
