= West Virginia State Auditor =

State Auditor of West Virginia
- Incumbent; Mark Hunt since January 13, 2025
- Style: Mister or Madam Auditor (informal); The Honorable (formal)
- Seat: West Virginia State Capitol; Charleston, West Virginia
- Appointer: General election
- Term length: Four years, unlimited
- Constituting instrument: Constitution of West Virginia: Article VI, Section 1; Article VII, Sections 1, 2, and 17; Article X, Section 3; Article XI, Section 7; and Article XII, Section 4
- Formation: June 20, 1863 (163 years ago)
- Salary: $95,000
- Website: Official website

The state auditor of West Virginia is an elected constitutional officer in the executive branch of the U.S. state of West Virginia. The incumbent is Mark Hunt, a Republican.

== Powers and duties ==
=== Bookkeeping responsibilities ===
Article X, Section 3 of the Constitution of West Virginia provides that "[n]o money shall be drawn from the treasury but in pursuance of an appropriation made by law, and on a warrant issued thereon by the auditor..." This constitutional mandate effectively designates the state auditor as the bookkeeper of state government. This function entails preauditing claims against the state, issuing warrants on the state treasury in payment of claims approved, administering payroll to state employees, accounting for revenues, expenditures, and monthly balances by both appropriation and fund, conducting the annual settlement of state accounts, and providing budget analysis services to state agencies.

However, the state auditor is not responsible for statewide financial accounting and reporting or the design and enforcement of the internal control system. Rather, the state's fiscal control function rests with the Finance Division in the Department of Administration. In this sense, the state auditor's office performs a role similar to that carried out by accounts payable departments in the private sector.

=== Other responsibilities ===
Statute law confers a number of other duties on the state auditor. Foremost among them, the state auditor is ex officio "chief inspector and supervisor of public offices". As such, the state auditor's office investigates waste, fraud, and abuse in state agencies and local governments, supervises local government finances, and audits West Virginia's approximately 700 political subdivisions, be they counties, cities, towns, or school districts. Additionally, the state auditor regulates the securities industry and administers tax-delinquent property that accrues to the state. This remit, when taken altogether, is unique among America's state auditors.
