= 2000 West Virginia Supreme Court of Appeals election =

- November 7, 2000
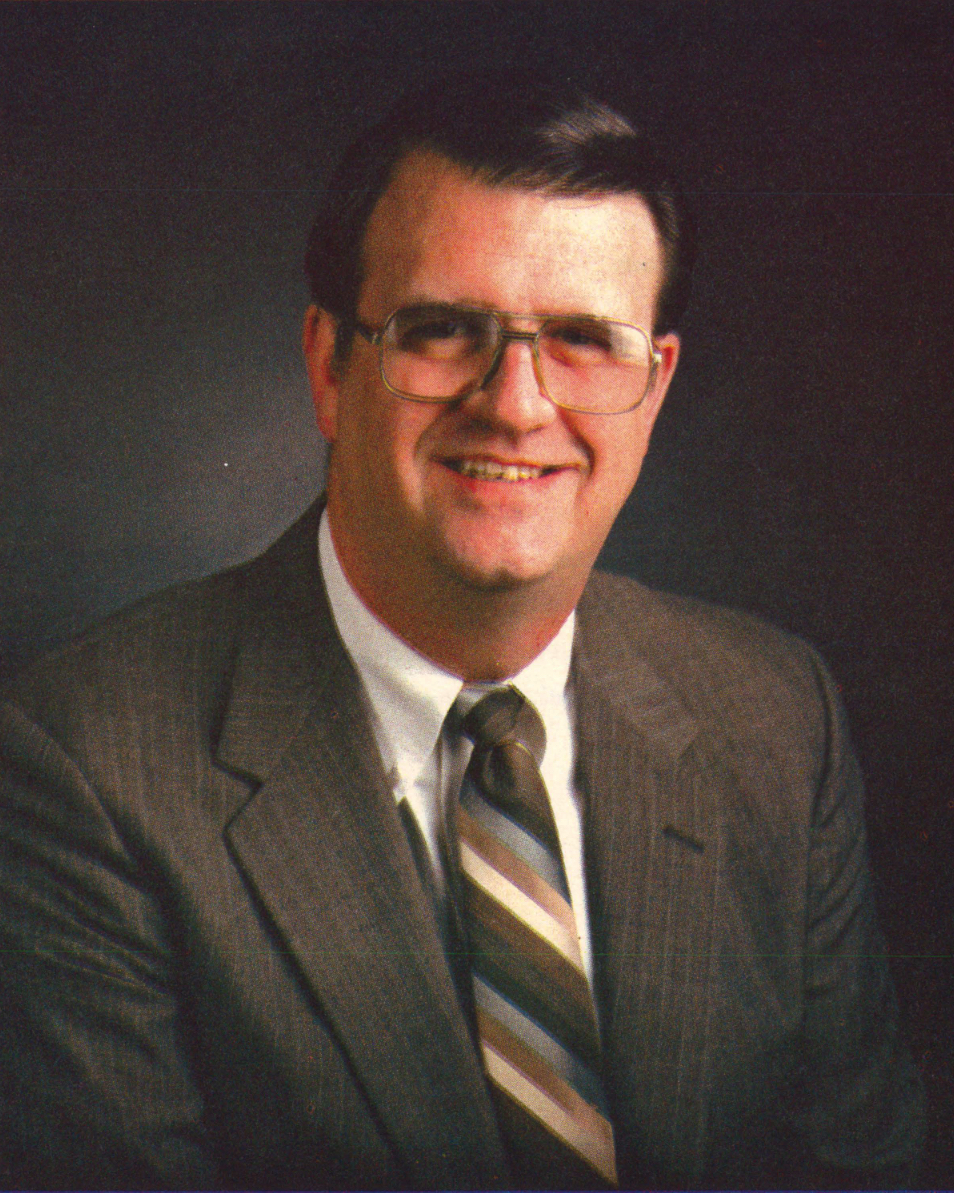

Nominee	Joseph Albright	Robin Davis	John C. Yoder
Party	Democratic	Democratic	Republican
Popular vote	366,833	309,804	218,195
Percentage	41.00%	34.62%	24.38%
Justices before election
Robin Davis
Democratic
George M. Scott
Republican
Elected Justices
Robin Davis
Democratic
Joseph Albright
Democratic

The 2000 West Virginia Supreme Court of Appeals election took place on November 7, 2000, to elect two Justices of the Supreme Court of Appeals of West Virginia for the next 12 years. The electoral system requires voters to vote for no more than two candidates.

Both Democratic candidates, former Justice Joseph Albright and incumbent Justice Robin Davis, were the top two vote-getters with 41.0% and 34.6% of the vote, respectively. Lone Republican nominee and former State Senator John C. Yoder came in a distant third with 24.4%, thus losing the election.

== Background ==
Democratic Justice Margaret Workman resigned from the court in August 1999. Republican governor Cecil H. Underwood replaced her with George M. Scott. Scott did not seek election to a full term.

Another Democratic Justice, Thomas B. Miller, retired in August 1994. Democratic governor Gaston Caperton subsequently appointed Franklin Cleckley to fill the vacancy. A special election was held for the seat in 1996, which Cleckley did not contest. Democrat Robin Davis won the election to fill the unexpired term.

Originally elected in 1998, Democratic Justice Warren McGraw sought Justice George M. Scott's open seat which was up for election in 2000, and was a twelve year term which would expire in 2012, despite the fact that his own term would expire in 2004. This was challenged in the state Supreme Court, and in a 4-1 decision, the Court held that McGraw was ineligible to run for a 12-year term in the year 2000 when he was already a member of the Court until the year 2004, and referred to his action as "audacious".

== Democratic primary ==
=== Candidates ===
==== Nominees ====
- Robin Davis, incumbent Justice of the Supreme Court of Appeals.
- Joseph Albright, former Justice of the Supreme Court of Appeals (1995-1996).

==== Eliminated in primary ====
- Evan Jenkins, member of the West Virginia House of Delegates from the 16th district.
- Bob Bastress, attorney and professor at the West Virginia University College of Law since 1978.

=== Results ===
Democratic primary
Party	Candidate	Votes	%
Democratic	Joseph Albright	131,948	34.21%
Democratic	Robin Davis (incumbent)	108,230	28.06%
Democratic	Evan Jenkins	75,968	19.70%
Democratic	Robert Bastress	69,565	18.03%
Total votes		385,711	100.00%

== Republican primary ==
=== Candidates ===
==== Nominee ====
- John C. Yoder, former State Senator from the 16th district.

=== Results ===
Republican primary
Party	Candidate	Votes	%
Republican	John C. Yoder	75,968	100.00%
Total votes		75,968	100.00%

== General election ==
=== Results ===
2000 West Virginia Supreme Court of Appeals election
Party	Candidate	Votes	%
Democratic	Joseph Albright	366,833	41.00%
Democratic	Robin Davis (incumbent)	309,804	34.62%
Republican	John C. Yoder	218,195	24.38%
Total votes		894,832	100.00%
Democratic gain from Republican			
Democratic hold			
