= 1996 West Virginia Supreme Court of Appeals election =

- November 5, 1996
Nominee	Spike Maynard	Larry Starcher
Party	Democratic	Democratic
Popular vote	307,700	306,731
Percentage	31.61%	31.52%
Nominee	John C. Yoder	Richard A. Robb
Party	Republican	Republican
Popular vote	182,423	176,462
Percentage	18.74%	18.13%
Justices before election
Arthur M. Recht
Democratic
Joseph Albright
Democratic
Elected Justices
Spike Maynard
Democratic
Larry Starcher
Democratic

The 1996 West Virginia Supreme Court of Appeals election took place on November 5, 1996, to elect two Justices of the Supreme Court of Appeals of West Virginia for the next 12 years. The election was concurrently held with a separate special election to complete Franklin Cleckley's unexpired term on the court. The electoral system requires voters to vote for no more than two candidates.

The original holders of the two seats up for election, Democratic Justices William T. Brotherton Jr. and Richard Neely, both retired in 1995. They were replaced by Arthur M. Recht and Joseph Albright, both appointed by Democratic Governor Gaston Caperton. However, they were defeated in the Democratic primary election by Larry Starcher and Spike Maynard, both Circuit Court Judges.

In the general election, Starcher and Maynard managed to defeat Republican candidates John C. Yoder, a State Senator from the 16th district, and Richard A. "Richie" Robb, mayor of South Charleston.

== Democratic primary ==
=== Candidates ===
==== Nominees ====
- Larry Starcher, judge of 17th Circuit Court.
- Spike Maynard, judge of 30th Circuit Court.

==== Eliminated in primary ====
- Joseph Albright, incumbent Justice of the Supreme Court of Appeals.
- Arthur M. Recht, incumbent Justice of the Supreme Court of Appeals.
- John R. Frazier, Mercer County Circuit Judge.
- Brian Gallagher, member of the House of Delegates from Monongalia County.

=== Results ===
May 14, 1996 Democratic primary
Party	Candidate	Votes	%
Democratic	Larry Starcher	110,875	23.88%
Democratic	Spike Maynard	92,075	19.84%
Democratic	Joseph Albright (incumbent)	87,892	18.93%
Democratic	Arthur M. Recht (incumbent)	63,746	13.73%
Democratic	John R. Frazier	56,390	12.15%
Democratic	Brian Gallagher	53,231	11.47%
Total votes		464,209	100.00%

== Republican primary ==
=== Candidates ===
==== Nominees ====
- John C. Yoder, State Senator from the 16th district.
- Richard A. "Richie" Robb, mayor of South Charleston.

=== Results ===
May 14, 1996 Republican primary
Party	Candidate	Votes	%
Republican	John C. Yoder	71,906	50.60%
Republican	Richard A. "Richie" Robb	70,190	49.40%
Total votes		142,096	100.00%

== General election ==
=== Results ===
1996 West Virginia Supreme Court of Appeals election
Party	Candidate	Votes	%
Democratic	Spike Maynard	307,700	31.61%
Democratic	Larry Starcher	306,731	31.52%
Republican	John C. Yoder	182,423	18.74%
Republican	Richard A. "Richie" Robb	176,462	18.13%
Total votes		973,316	100.00%
Democratic hold			
Democratic hold			
