= Caperton v. A.T. Massey Coal Co. =

2009 United States Supreme Court case

Caperton v. Massey
- Supreme Court of the United States

Argued March 3, 2009 Decided June 8, 2009
- Full case name: Caperton v. A. T. Massey Coal Co.
- Docket no.: 08-22
- Citations: 556 U.S. 868 (more) 129 S. Ct. 2252; 173 L. Ed. 2d 1208; 2009 U.S. LEXIS 4157; 77 USLW 4456; 09 Cal. Daily Op. Serv. 7053; 2009 Daily Journal D.A.R. 8207; 21 Fla. L. Weekly Fed. S 908
- Argument: Oral argument

Case history
- Prior: 223 W. Va. 624, 679 S.E.2d 223 (2008); cert. granted, Caperton v. A.T. Massey Coal Co., 555 U.S. 1028 (2008).

Holding
- The Due Process Clause of the Fourteenth Amendment requires judges to recuse themselves not only when actual bias has been demonstrated or when the judge has an economic interest in the outcome of the case but also when "extreme facts" create a "probability of bias."

Court membership
- Chief Justice John Roberts Associate Justices John P. Stevens · Antonin Scalia; Anthony Kennedy · David Souter; Clarence Thomas · Ruth Bader Ginsburg; Stephen Breyer · Samuel Alito

Case opinions
- Majority: Kennedy, joined by Stevens, Souter, Ginsburg, Breyer
- Dissent: Roberts, joined by Scalia, Thomas, Alito
- Dissent: Scalia

Caperton v. A. T. Massey Coal Co., 556 U.S. 868 (2009), is a case in which the United States Supreme Court held that the Due Process Clause of the Fourteenth Amendment requires judges to recuse themselves not only when actual bias has been demonstrated or when the judge has an economic interest in the outcome of the case but also when "extreme facts" create a "probability of bias."

== Background ==
In 1998, Harman Mining Company president Hugh Caperton filed a lawsuit against A.T. Massey Coal Company alleging that Massey fraudulently cancelled a coal supply contract with Harman Mining, resulting in its going out of business. In August 2002, a Boone County, West Virginia jury found in favor of Caperton and awarded $50 million in damages.

While the case was awaiting hearing in the West Virginia Supreme Court of Appeals, A.T. Massey's Chief Executive Officer, Don Blankenship, became involved in the election campaign pitting incumbent Supreme Court Justice Warren McGraw against Charleston lawyer Brent Benjamin. Blankenship created a non-profit corporation called "And for the Sake of the Kids" in order to force McGraw off the court and replace him with Benjamin through which he contributed over $3 million in Benjamin's behalf, an amount which, if it had been contributed directly to his campaign, was about 3,000 times the maximum permissible direct contribution to an election campaign. This amounted to more than the total amount spent by all other Benjamin supporters and Benjamin's own campaign committee. Much of the money went to an advertising campaign aimed at questioning McGraw's impartiality. McGraw further damaged his campaign during a speech at the 2004 United Mine Workers of America's Labor Day rally in Racine, West Virginia in which he alleged that Republican operatives were following him "looking for ugly". The speech, sometimes referred to as the "Scream at Racine" or the "Scream from Racine" was featured in several campaign advertisements sponsored by the West Virginia Republican Party and may have played a large role in McGraw's defeat in November 2004.

== Caperton Appeal ==
In 2007, when the case came before the West Virginia Supreme Court, Caperton petitioned for Justice Benjamin to recuse himself because of Blankenship's contributions during the campaign. Benjamin declined and was ultimately part of the 3 to 2 majority that overturned the $50 million verdict.

Blankenship also petitioned for Justice Larry Starcher's recusal due to a perceived public feud in which Starcher allegedly called Blankenship "stupid" and "a clown," and accused Blankenship of buying a seat on the West Virginia Supreme Court. Starcher also refused to withdraw from the case, prompting a lawsuit from Massey Energy over the West Virginia Supreme Court's recusal procedures. Caperton then asked for and was granted a rehearing of the case. Justice Starcher eventually recused himself from the case and decided not to run for reelection.

Around the same time, Justice Spike Maynard (who had also been part of the 3 to 2 majority) recused himself when photos of him vacationing with Blankenship in the French Riviera while the case was pending appeared in the media. Although Maynard was heavily favored to win reelection in 2008, the photos were featured heavily in the campaign and Maynard was defeated in the primary.

In April 2008, the West Virginia Supreme Court again ruled in favor of Massey, with Benjamin again joining the 3 to 2 majority.

Represented by former U.S. Solicitor General Theodore Olson, Caperton filed a petition with the United States Supreme Court arguing that Blankenship's 2004 campaign expenditures on behalf of Benjamin's election raised an appearance of partiality on Benjamin's part, and due process required his recusal. Justice Benjamin countered that he was not biased and that because there was no direct financial or other connection between him and Blankenship, there was no obligation for him to recuse himself.

== Opinion of the U.S. Supreme Court ==
The United States Supreme Court heard oral arguments in March 2009. In June 2009, the Court found for Caperton and Harman Mining, remanding the case back to the West Virginia Supreme Court. Justice Anthony M. Kennedy wrote for the majority, joined by Justices Stevens, Souter, Ginsburg, and Breyer. Chief Justice John G. Roberts wrote the dissent and was joined by Justices Scalia, Thomas, and Alito. Justice Scalia also filed a separate dissenting opinion.

=== Majority decision ===
Writing for the majority, Justice Kennedy called the appearance of a conflict of interest so "extreme" that Benjamin's failure to recuse himself constituted a violation of the plaintiff's Constitutional right to due process under the Fourteenth Amendment. Justice Kennedy noted that not every campaign contribution by a litigant creates a probability of bias that requires a judge's recusal. Justice Kennedy wrote, "We conclude that there is a serious risk of actual bias — based on objective and reasonable perceptions — when a person with a personal stake in a particular case had a significant and disproportionate influence in placing the judge on the case by raising funds or directing the judge's election campaign when the case was pending or imminent."

"The inquiry," Justice Kennedy wrote, "centers on the contribution's relative size in comparison to the total amount of money contributed to the campaign, the total amount spent in the election, and the apparent effect such contribution had on the outcome of the election." Applying that test, Justice Kennedy ruled for the Court that "Blankenship's significant and disproportionate influence—coupled with the temporal relationship between the election and the pending case—"' "offer a possible temptation to the average . . . judge to . . . lead him not to hold the balance nice, clear and true."' "On these extreme facts the probability of actual bias rises to an unconstitutional level."

In holding that Justice Benjamin's participation in the case was a violation of due process, the Court made no finding of actual bias by Justice Benjamin: "In other words, based on the facts presented by Caperton, Justice Benjamin conducted a probing search into his actual motives and inclinations; and he found none to be improper. We do not question his subjective findings of impartiality and propriety. Nor do we determine whether there was actual bias."

=== Dissenting opinions ===
In a vigorous dissent, Chief Justice Roberts wrote that the majority decision would have dire consequences for "public confidence in judicial impartiality." The dissent emphasized that the "probability of bias" standard formulated by the Court was excessively vague and "inherently boundless." In an effort to demonstrate that "probability of bias" is an unclear and unworkable standard which gives no guidance to lower courts, Chief Justice Roberts' dissent posed forty questions about the scope of the decision, including how large of a contribution should be considered "disproportionate," what type of support is disqualifying, whether the case had been pending at the time of the election, how long after an election should any putative bias on behalf of a particular judge be construed, whether a judge's vote has to be outcome determinative in order for his non-recusal to constitute a due process violation or whether the parties are entitled to discovery with respect to a judge's recusal decision, among many other questions.

Chief Justice Roberts noted that previously the Supreme Court had recognized only two situations in which the Fourteenth Amendment's Due Process Clause disqualified a judge (specifically when the judge has a financial interest in the outcome of the case and when the judge is trying a defendant for criminal contempt in his own court). Chief Justice Roberts contrasted the objective nature of these situations to the completely subjective inquiry required by the "probability of bias" standard.

In a separate dissent, Justice Scalia notes that the uncertainty described by Chief Justice Roberts would permit Fourteenth Amendment Due Process claims asserting judicial bias "in all litigated cases in (at least) those 39 States that elect their judges." Justice Scalia predicted, "Many billable hours will be spent in poring through volumes of campaign finance reports, and many more in contesting nonrecusal decisions through every available means."

== Subsequent developments ==
In September 2009, the case was reheard before the Supreme Court of Appeals of West Virginia, with retired Putnam County Circuit Judge James O. Holliday replacing Justice Benjamin. Massey's lawsuit over Justice Starcher's refusal to recuse himself was dropped in July 2009 when Starcher departed from the court. Justice Joseph Albright, who had sided with Caperton, took a leave of absence in July 2008, after being diagnosed with esophageal cancer before dying on March 20, 2009, in Pittsburgh while undergoing treatment. That left Justice Robin Davis as the only remaining justice on the West Virginia Supreme Court who had previously heard the case.

On November 12, 2009, the West Virginia Supreme Court once again overturned the cases, ruling 4 to 1 that Caperton should have pursued his claims in Virginia under a clause in the contract at issue; Massey Energy is based in Richmond, Virginia. Caperton's attorneys requested the State Supreme Court to reconsider its decision, but the court declined the request.

The original case involving contributions to judges on the West Virginia Supreme Court drew national attention and ultimately became the basis for the best-selling 2008 novel The Appeal by John Grisham.

=== Criticisms ===
Legal scholars believe the ramifications from this case could be significant. Michael Zuckerman and Andrey Spektor have written that, taken together with the Court's decision in Republican Party of Minnesota v. White (2002), in which the Court held that elected judges have a First Amendment right to make their political views known, Caperton "provide[s] the makings of a constitutional crisis. On one hand, judges have a First Amendment right to say almost anything even if it seems to effectively bind them in future cases. On the other hand, litigants have a due process right not to face a judge whom a reasonable person may deem biased given his previously advertised views." That door was later closed by Nevada Commission on Ethics v. Carrigan.

== See also ==
- Aetna Life Ins. Co. v. Lavoie
