= The Appeal =

2008 novel by John Grisham

- First edition cover
- Author: John Grisham
- Cover artist: John Fontana; Shasti O'Leary Soudant
- Language: English
- Genre: Legal thriller
- Publisher: Doubleday
- Publication date: January 29, 2008
- Publication place: United States
- Media type: Print (hardcover)
- Pages: 484 pages
- ISBN: 978-0-385-51504-7

The Appeal is a 2008 novel by John Grisham, his 21st book and his first fictional legal thriller since The Broker was published in 2005. It was published by Doubleday and released in hardcover in the United States on January 29, 2008. A paperback edition was released by Delta Publishing on November 18, 2008.

== Plot ==
Mississippi attorneys Wes and Mary Grace Payton have battled New York City-based Krane Chemical in an effort to seek justice for Jeannette Baker, whose husband and son died from carcinogenic pollutants that the company knowingly and negligently allowed to seep into their town's water supply. When the jury awards Baker $3 million in wrongful death damages and $38 million in punitive damages, billionaire stockholder Carl Trudeau vows to do whatever is necessary to overturn their decision and save the company's stocks.

Since Mississippi Supreme Court justices are elected rather than appointed, Trudeau plots with Barry Rinehart of Troy-Hogan, a shady Boca Raton firm that deals only in judicial elections, to select a candidate who can replace the liberal Sheila McCarthy. Their anointed candidate is Ron Fisk, a lawyer with no political experience or ambitions. He is naïve enough to be impressed by the attention shown him by his backers, and does not question his source of funding or his campaign team's underhanded tactics. Rinehart also uses Clete Coley, a clownish third party candidate, to draw support away from McCarthy and then cede it to Fisk when he eventually withdraws from the race.

Fisk defeats McCarthy and immediately votes against upholding several large settlements in cases brought before the court on appeal, and the Paytons expect he will do the same when their case comes up for review. What they do not anticipate is Fisk unexpectedly being forced to rethink his stance when his son is critically injured by a defective product and left permanently impaired by a medical error. The issue of corporate responsibility affects him and his family on a personal level. However, even though Fisk is aware that he has been used and tricked, he ultimately reverts the verdict against Krane, as he acknowledges also that changing positions due to his personal tragedy would be an act more compromising of his judicial integrity. Fisk does not immediately take legal action for what happened to his son due to fears of appearing hypocritical, but confirms a less-important verdict concerning medical neglect, implying his judicial philosophy may yet change over time. Meanwhile, stocks of Krane Chemical have plummeted after the original verdict, compounded by Trudeau's negative marketing of the company's health and finance. Trudeau secretly invested heavily while the share price was depressed, to strengthen his grasp of the company. Now, seeing a resurgence, Trudeau has increased his wealth significantly.

== Background ==
Grisham has stated that the novel was inspired by the tax evasion and bribery cases involving former Mississippi Supreme Court Judge Oliver E. Diaz Jr. Mississippi elects judges directly. Grisham appears in the documentary Hot Coffee commenting on Judge Diaz.

Grisham's plot closely resembles a real-life decade-long legal battle between West Virginia coal mining competitors. When Don Blankenship, chairman and CEO of A.T. Massey Coal, lost a $50 million verdict in a fraud lawsuit brought by Hugh Caperton and Harman Mining over the cancellation of a long-term coal contract, he contributed $3 million to help Charleston lawyer Brent Benjamin unseat incumbent Judge Warren McGraw. Benjamin won the election, and three years later, when Massey's appeal reached the Supreme Court of Appeals of West Virginia, Caperton's lawyers asked him to recuse himself because of Blankenship's financial support. Benjamin declined and cast the crucial vote to reverse the Caperton verdict. Among those who noticed similarities between the case and The Appeal was former West Virginia justice Larry Starcher, who criticized Benjamin for not disqualifying himself. He wrote in an opinion, "I believe John Grisham got it right when he said that he simply had to read The Charleston Gazette to get an idea for his next novel."

In June 2009, the United States Supreme Court ruled that Justice Benjamin should have recused himself in Caperton v. Massey, sending the case back to the West Virginia Supreme Court. Writing for the majority in the 5 to 4 decision, Justice Anthony M. Kennedy called the appearance of conflict of interest "so extreme" that the failure to recuse constituted a threat to the plaintiff’s Constitutional right to due process under the Fourteenth Amendment. Chief Justice John Roberts' dissent warned that the Court's majority decision would have dire consequences for "public confidence in judicial impartiality."

Only a minority of states elect judges directly, a controversial system virtually unknown outside the United States. The Appeal has been seen as an attack on this system of selecting judges, since judges have a conflict of interest when ruling on cases involving major campaign contributors.
