= 1998 West Virginia Supreme Court of Appeals special election =

- November 3, 1998
Nominee	Warren McGraw	John F. McCuskey
Party	Democratic	Republican
Popular vote	194,951	167,907
Percentage	53.73%	46.27%
Justice before election
John F. McCuskey
Republican
Elected Justice
Warren McGraw
Democratic

The 1998 West Virginia Supreme Court of Appeals special election took place on November 3, 1998, to elect a Justice of the Supreme Court of Appeals of West Virginia for the next six years. The election was held to complete the unexpired term of Democratic Justice Thomas McHugh, who retired in December 1997. Republican governor Cecil H. Underwood appointed John F. McCuskey to fill the vacancy.

McCuskey lost the general election to Democratic nominee and former Senate President Warren McGraw, 53.7% to 46.3%.

== Democratic primary ==
=== Candidates ===
==== Nominee ====
- Warren McGraw, former Senate President (1981-1985), candidate for governor in 1984, and brother of incumbent Attorney General Darrell McGraw.

==== Eliminated in primary ====
- Joseph Albright, former Justice of the Supreme Court of Appeals (1995-1996) and former Speaker of the House of Delegates (1985-1987).
- William C. "Bill" Forbes, Kanawha County Prosecuting Attorney and lead prosecutor in the investigation of Attorney General Charlie Brown in 1989.

=== Results ===
Democratic primary
Party	Candidate	Votes	%
Democratic	Warren McGraw	88,091	45.06%
Democratic	Joseph Albright	61,219	31.31%
Democratic	Bill Forbes	46,191	23.63%
Total votes		195,501	100.00%

== Republican primary ==
=== Candidates ===
==== Nominee ====
- John F. McCuskey, incumbent Justice of the Supreme Court of Appeals.

==== Eliminated in primary ====
- John C. Yoder, former State Senator from the 16th district (1993-1997).

=== Results ===
Republican primary
Party	Candidate	Votes	%
Republican	John F. McCuskey (incumbent)	47,923	65.86%
Republican	John C. Yoder	24,843	34.14%
Total votes		72,766	100.00%

== General election ==
=== Results ===
1998 West Virginia Supreme Court of Appeals special election
Party	Candidate	Votes	%
Democratic	Warren McGraw	194,951	53.73%
Republican	John F. McCuskey (incumbent)	167,907	46.27%
Total votes		362,858	100.00%
Democratic gain from Republican			
