= List of United States Supreme Court cases, volume 475 =

This is a list of all the United States Supreme Court cases from volume 475 of the United States Reports:

Case name	Citation	Date decided
Pacific Gas & Elec. Co. v. Public Util. Comm'n of Cal.	475 U.S. 1	1986
Renton v. Playtime Theatres, Inc.	475 U.S. 41	1986
United States v. Mechanik	475 U.S. 66	1986
United States v. Maine	475 U.S. 89	1986
New York v. Class	475 U.S. 106	1986
United States v. Koecher	475 U.S. 133	1986
Texas v. McCullough	475 U.S. 134	1986
Nix v. Whiteside	475 U.S. 157	1986
NLRB v. Financial Institution Employees	475 U.S. 192	1986
Connolly v. Pension Benefit Guaranty Corporation	475 U.S. 211	1986
Morris v. Mathews	475 U.S. 237	1986
Fisher v. Berkeley	475 U.S. 260	1986
Wisconsin Dept. of Industry v. Gould Inc.	475 U.S. 282	1986
Chicago Teachers Union v. Hudson	475 U.S. 292	1986
Whitley v. Albers	475 U.S. 312	1986
Malley v. Briggs	475 U.S. 335	1986
Exxon Corp. v. Hunt	475 U.S. 355	1986
United States v. Inadi	475 U.S. 387	1986
Moran v. Burbine	475 U.S. 412	1986
Pembaur v. Cincinnati	475 U.S. 469	1986
Goldman v. Weinberger	475 U.S. 503	1986
Bender v. Williamsport Area School Dist.	475 U.S. 534	1986
Paulussen v. Herion	475 U.S. 557	1986
Holbrook v. Flynn	475 U.S. 560	1986
Matsushita Elec. Industrial Co. v. Zenith Radio Corp.	475 U.S. 574	1986
Golden State Transit Corp. v. Los Angeles	475 U.S. 608	1986
Michigan v. Jackson	475 U.S. 625	1986
AT&T Technologies, Inc. v. Communications Workers	475 U.S. 643	1986
United States v. Fulton	475 U.S. 657	1986
Delaware v. Van Arsdall	475 U.S. 673	1986
Icicle Seafoods, Inc. v. Worthington	475 U.S. 709	1986
Evans v. Jeff D.	475 U.S. 717	1986
Philadelphia Newspapers v. Hepps	475 U.S. 767	1986
United States v. Quinn	475 U.S. 791	1986
Los Angeles v. Heller	475 U.S. 796	1986
Dennison Mfg. Co. v. Panduit Corp.	475 U.S. 809	1986
Aetna Life Ins. Co. v. Lavoie	475 U.S. 813	1986
United States v. American College of Physicians	475 U.S. 834	1986
Sorenson v. Secretary of Treasury	475 U.S. 851	1986
New York v. P. J. Video, Inc.	475 U.S. 868	1986
California v. Brown	475 U.S. 1301	1986
