= Holbrook v. Flynn =

- Supreme Court of the United States

Argued January 14, 1986 Decided March 26, 1986
- Full case name: Terrance HOLBROOK, Superintendent, Massachusetts Correctional Institution, Norfolk, Massachusetts, et al. v. Charles FLYNN
- Citations: 475 U.S. 560 (more) 106 S.Ct. 1340, 89 L.Ed.2d 525
- Argument: Oral argument

Holding
- The visible presence of armed, uniformed, security officers in a courtroom is not inherently prejudicial to a defendant's right to a fair trial.

Court membership
- Chief Justice Warren E. Burger Associate Justices William J. Brennan Jr. · Byron White; Thurgood Marshall · Harry Blackmun; Lewis F. Powell Jr. · William Rehnquist; John P. Stevens · Sandra Day O'Connor

Case opinions
- Majority: Marshall, joined by unanimous
- Concurrence: Burger

Laws applied
- U.S. Const. amend. VI

Holbrook v. Flynn, 475 U.S. 560 (1986), was a case decided by the United States Supreme Court regarding the Sixth Amendment's right to an impartial jury.

== Background ==
In January 1976, Charles Flynn and five codefendants were indicted for a $4 million heist of the Providence, Rhode Island Bonded Vault Co. that happened on August 14, 1975. When the defendants were brought to trial in April 1976, their counsel objected to the presence of four uniformed state troopers sitting in the first row of the spectators' section. The attorneys argued that the presence of armed, uniformed police officers, would lead jurors to perceive the defendants as "[being] of 'bad character'."

The Superior Court Associate Justice, Anthony A. Giannini responded that Providence's "Committing Squad" was overextended, but accepted a request to determine if the troopers can wear plainclothes for future appearances. A week later, Giannini denied the request as it was considered impractical. He further emphasized that he did not request the troopers, and that there was little risk of prejudice as they were seated behind the spectator bar. Nonetheless, jury selection would begin by examining whether prospective jurors would draw inferences from the presence of the troopers.

During jury selection, the defendant's lawyers filed an interlocutory appeal in the Supreme Court of Justice. After initially denying the petition, the lower court eventually ruled that the trial judge must make a final decision regarding the presence of the State Police as the presence of armed and uniformed guards is a departure from usual Rhode Island court procedures.

Judge Giannini then conducted a hearing at the request of the prosecution where a Providence Police Department captain and the State Police's Executive Officer testified that the Committing Squad was overextended and that there was a contractual obligation with the Fraternal Order of Police to specifically provide uniformed officers in the commission of court security duties.

With the respondent's motion struck down, Judge Giannini further declared that all 54 prospective jurors were either not influenced against the defendant despite the troopers' presence, or they vaguely stated a need for security.

After a two-month trial, half of the codefendants were acquitted while Flynn and the rest were convicted. The Rhode Island Supreme Court upheld the conviction by stating that the circumstances did not prejudice the defendants.

The District Court for the District of Rhode Island upheld the state supreme court's dismissal under the reasoning that the alternatives were rejected under a rational basis. However, the United States Court of Appeals for the First Circuit reversed the District Court by concluding that the unusual nature of the troopers' presence, as well as Judge Giannini's failure to consider the defendants' behavior, made the court proceedings entirely unacceptable.

== Decision ==
In an opinion delivered by Justice Thurgood Marshall, the Court unanimously ruled that while there are cases where a courtroom full of armed and uniformed officers can create prejudice, the presence of four uniformed troopers sitting quietly while overlooking six defendants is not inherently prejudicial. There is also a legitimate need to provide security against outside threats. Flynn therefore failed to satisfy the burden of proof showing actual prejudice.

=== Concurring opinion ===
Chief Justice Warren Burger concurred with the opinion, but objected to Marshall's statement that the Court might express a preference that federal officers providing security should not be easily identifiable as guards. Furthermore, Burger highlighted a study that tentatively concluded that defendants wearing prison garb, or surrounded by guards are more likely to be convicted. In discussing the Court's opinion that a policy requiring defendants to wear prison garb is arbitrarily discriminating against those without bail, Burger noted favored treatment given to defendants that both wore prison clothes, and had visible supervision.
