= Japanese Television Cartel =

Cartel to control the manufacture and sale of television sets

The Japanese Television Cartel was a cartel formed by the seven largest Japanese television manufacturers. It operated from the 1950s until at least 1974. During that time period it engaged in illegal activities such as dumping, as well as price and output manipulation with the goal of taking control over the Japanese and American TV markets. Its operation halted in the aftermath of a series of investigations conducted by the authorities of the two countries.

== Background ==
In 1950, the Japanese economy entered a phase of rapid growth which would last until 1973. This period was characterized by a number of protectionist policies including but not limited to the enactment of discriminatory laws towards foreign trade partners, the insulation and oligopolization of capital markets, the bureaucratic allocation of foreign exchange as well as state coordinated acquisition of foreign technology. The adoption of large scale production techniques and foreign know-how, led to a reduction in unit cost, which allowed large companies to expand their operations with the aid of loans from the country's largest banks which were given at sub-equilibrium interest rates. Nevertheless, Japan's leap into industrialization was not matched by the development of its product distribution systems, which remained largely unchanged. Companies reacted to the resulting bottleneck effect in sales by vertically integrating their sales systems, through the creation of informal business groups known as keiretsu. The formation of keiretsu, enabled manufacturers to enter into collusion with distribution companies by fixing the price of the product at an artificially low level, while the distributors' losses were secretly refunded through a system of rebates. Distributors were accordingly rewarded or punished for their cooperation and loyalty.

== Cartel ==
Beginning its rise in the mid-1950s the Japanese home appliance production increased 25-fold by 1968. Pioneered in Europe and the United States, television technology spread to Japan by means of licensing arrangements and technical assistance from companies such as Westinghouse, Philips, General Electric, Zenith Electronics and Western Electric. The Japanese television market was dominated by seven companies, namely Hitachi, Toshiba, Matsushita, Sony, Sanyo, Sharp and Mitsubishi, who controlled a combined 99.9% of the market share. Facing the aforementioned distribution bottlenecks, television producers began dividing Japan into territories, thereafter assigning wholesalers to each one. With the wholesale industry under their complete control, television companies went on to create an undercover "Market Stabilization Group" which included the six of the biggest players in the industry excluding Sony. An investigation by the Fair Trade Commission of Japan (FTCJ) uncovered a series of monthly, clandestine meetings, conducted by the higher management echelons of the industry over a period of 15 years. The group admitted to intentionally limiting the profit margin of retailers, minimizing sales to non-affiliated retailers, horizontal price and output manipulation. A further investigation also revealed the existence of a vertical price-fixing scheme between Sony and Matsushita. Despite the findings the FTCJ did not impose major fines or structural adjustments to those involved until the Matsushita Electric Industrial Co. v. Zenith Radio Corp. lawsuit was launched in the United States in 1985.

Investigation within the US revealed the presence of five interconnected working groups involving all seven of the major Japanese companies, which met from 1964 until at least 1974. The groups, actively shared data on topics such as production, inventory, and shipment sizes. The information was then in ways similar to the ones already implemented in Japan. The cartels maintained an economic policy of increasing prices at the Japanese market while also dumping their products abroad, in an effort to damage their American competitors through predatory pricing. American companies failed to exploit their sudden competitive advantage on the Japanese market, while also suffering heavy losses domestically. The restructuring of the American television market resulted in the exit of 21 companies and the fall of numerous others into Japanese hands. Dumping and the aggressive use of rebates were determined to be forms of customs fraud under the 1921 U.S. Anti-Dumping Act, however. The U.S. Federal agencies such as the International Trade Commission conducted dozens of investigations, resulting in the Japanese-American Orderly Marketing Agreement, which limited the import of Japanese TV sets. In April 1980, the companies involved in the cartel were ordered to pay $66 million; however the collection of the fine was delayed for a significant time period as litigation continued.

== See also ==
- Phoebus cartel
