= Nix v. Whiteside =

- Supreme Court of the United States

Argued November 5, 1985 Decided February 26, 1986
- Full case name: Crispus Nix, Warden, Petitioner v. Emanuel Charles Whiteside
- Citations: 475 U.S. 157 (more) 106 S.Ct. 988; 89 L. Ed. 2d 123; 1986 U.S. LEXIS 8

Holding
- The Sixth Amendment right of a criminal defendant to assistance of counsel is not violated when an attorney refuses to cooperate with the defendant in presenting perjured testimony at his trial.

Court membership
- Chief Justice Warren E. Burger Associate Justices William J. Brennan Jr. · Byron White; Thurgood Marshall · Harry Blackmun; Lewis F. Powell Jr. · William Rehnquist; John P. Stevens · Sandra Day O'Connor

Case opinions
- Majority: Burger, joined by White, Powell, Rehnquist, O'Connor
- Concurrence: Brennan
- Concurrence: Blackmun, joined by Brennan, Marshall, Stevens
- Concurrence: Stevens

Laws applied
- U.S. Const. amend. VI

Nix v. Whiteside, 475 U.S. 157 (1986), was a United States Supreme Court decision that dealt with the effective assistance of counsel during a criminal trial.

== Background ==
Before his trial for murder, the defendant, Whiteside, discussed his planned testimony with his attorney, and said that he had seen "something metallic in [the victim's] hand", in contradiction to earlier statements that he had not seen a gun in the victim's hand. Whiteside's attorney, Robinson, had warned that he (Robinson) would have an ethical obligation to report perjured testimony to the court. Whiteside, on the stand, admitted that while he believed the victim had a gun, he did not actually see a gun in the victim's hand. Whiteside was convicted, and subsequently applied for a federal writ of habeas corpus, on the grounds that his conviction was tainted under the Sixth Amendment in that his attorney's threat to disclose the perjury had deprived Whiteside of effective assistance of counsel.

== Supreme Court decision ==
The Court ruled unanimously that Whiteside had not been deprived of his Sixth Amendment rights. The majority opinion, written by Chief Justice Burger, stated that an attorney's duty to his client's cause is "limited to legitimate, lawful conduct compatible with the very nature of a trial as a search for truth", and that "the right to counsel includes no right to have a lawyer who will cooperate with planned perjury".

Concurrences by Justices Blackmun, Brennan and Stevens stated that Whiteside had failed to show that the attorney's actions had caused prejudice to the defendant's trial required to sustain a claim of "ineffective representation", as required by the case of Strickland v. Washington, 466 U.S. 668 (1984).

In a separate concurrence, Justice Brennan said that the Court is deciding only the narrow issue "conduct acceptable under the Sixth Amendment" (quoting the lower court). "Unfortunately, the Court seems unable to resist the temptation of sharing with the legal community its vision of ethical conduct." But it is up to "the States... how [lawyers] behave in their courts, unless and until federal rights are violated."

== See also ==
- List of United States Supreme Court cases, volume 475
- List of United States Supreme Court cases
- Lists of United States Supreme Court cases by volume
- List of United States Supreme Court cases by the Rehnquist Court
