= Harlan M. Calhoun =

American judge (1903–1977)

Harlan M. Calhoun (October 25, 1903 – April 17, 1977) was a justice of the Supreme Court of Appeals of West Virginia from November 4, 1958 until his retirement on May 15, 1972.

Born in Franklin, West Virginia, Calhoun attended Potomac State College, and received his law degree from West Virginia University in 1926. He was a prosecuting attorney for four years, and in 1936 he was elected to the West Virginia circuit court. In 1958, he was appointed to a vacancy on the state supreme court, to which he was thereafter elected.

Calhoun was a Democrat.

Calhoun married Florence Simpson, with whom he had two daughters. He died at his home in Charleston, West Virginia, at the age of 73.

Political offices
Preceded by Robert T. Donley	Justice of the Supreme Court of Appeals of West Virginia; 1958–1972	Succeeded by Oliver D. Kessel
