= Philadelphia Newspapers v. Hepps =

- Supreme Court of the United States

Argued December 3, 1985 Decided April 21, 1986
- Full case name: Philadelphia Newspapers v. Hepps
- Citations: 475 U.S. 767 (more) 106 S. Ct. 1558; 89 L. Ed. 2d 783

Case history
- Prior: Hepps v. Philadelphia Newspapers, Inc., 506 Pa. 304, 485 A.2d 374 (1984); probable jurisdiction noted, 472 U.S. 1025 (1985).

Holding
- Libel plaintiffs must shoulder the burden of proving falsity when the article in question relates to public concern.

Court membership
- Chief Justice Warren E. Burger Associate Justices William J. Brennan Jr. · Byron White; Thurgood Marshall · Harry Blackmun; Lewis F. Powell Jr. · William Rehnquist; John P. Stevens · Sandra Day O'Connor

Case opinions
- Majority: O'Connor, joined by Brennan, Marshall, Blackmun, Powell
- Concurrence: Brennan, joined by Blackmun
- Dissent: Stevens, joined by Burger, White, Rehnquist

Philadelphia Newspapers v. Hepps, 475 U.S. 767 (1986), is a United States Supreme Court case decided April 21, 1986.

== Facts and prior history ==
Maurice S. Hepps was the principal stockholder of a corporation that had a chain of stores selling beer, soft drinks, and snacks. The Philadelphia Inquirer published a series of articles on Hepps being linked to organized crime and using some of those links to influence the State’s governmental processes. They accused Hepps of being linked to organized crime and capitalizing on that connection to influence the state legislature through articles that were published in the Philadelphia newspaper The Inquirer, owned by Philadelphia Newspapers, Inc. Hepps brought a defamation suit into a Pennsylvania state court against Philadelphia Newspapers Inc. and the authors of the articles.

The Pennsylvania statute gave The Philadelphia Newspaper Inc. the burden of proof on the question of truth or falsity. The jury ruled in favor of the Philadelphia Newspaper Inc. The case was remanded for a new trial.

The Pennsylvania Supreme Court favored Hepps, holding that the newspaper was obligated to prove its accusations true.

== Decision ==
=== Majority ===
On Monday, April 21, 1986 the United States Supreme Court overruled the state court in a 5–4 decision written by Sandra Day O'Connor. They held that libel plaintiffs must shoulder the burden of proving falsity, when the article in question relates to public concern.

The newspaper published an article of public concern about a private figure; the private figure cannot recover damages without showing the statements are false. This court case dealt with the issues of the first amendment, libel, and defamation.

=== Concurrence ===
Justice Brennan wrote a short concurrence in which Justice Blackmun joined. He notes his belief that where "allegedly defamatory speech is of public concern" that the First Amendment requires a plaintiff (be it a public official, public figure, or private individual) prove the statements to be false. He writes to note his adherence to his view that a distinction based on whether or not the defendant is part of the media is not reconcilable with a First Amendment principle that states that "the inherent worth of speech in terms of its capacity for informing the public is not dependent on the identity of the source".

=== Dissent ===
Justice Stevens wrote a dissent in which Chief Justice Burger and Justices White and Rehnquist joined. He starts out by stating that the majority decision will only make a difference in cases in which a private individual can prove he was libeled by a defendant who was at least negligent. He writes that as long as publishers are protected by having the burden of proof be on the plaintiff, there is little basis for a concern that a large amount of true speech is deterred unless a private person who is the victim of malicious libel can prove falsity.
