= Renton v. Playtime Theatres, Inc. =

- Supreme Court of the United States

Argued November 12, 1985 Decided February 25, 1986
- Full case name: City of Renton et al. v. Playtime Theatres, Inc., et al.
- Citations: 475 U.S. 41 (more) 106 S. Ct. 925; 89 L. Ed. 2d 29; 1986 U.S. LEXIS 2

Case history
- Prior: Reversed and remanded, 748 F.2d 527 (9th Cir. 1984).

Holding
- The restriction imposed by Renton's ordinance was a permissible, content-neutral time/place/manner regulation.

Court membership
- Chief Justice Warren E. Burger Associate Justices William J. Brennan Jr. · Byron White; Thurgood Marshall · Harry Blackmun; Lewis F. Powell Jr. · William Rehnquist; John P. Stevens · Sandra Day O'Connor

Case opinions
- Majority: Rehnquist, joined by Burger, White, Powell, Stevens, O'Connor
- Concurrence: Blackmun
- Dissent: Brennan, joined by Marshall

Laws applied
- U.S. Const. amend. I

Renton v. Playtime Theatres, Inc., 475 U.S. 41 (1986), was a case in which the Supreme Court of the United States held that localities may impose regulations prohibiting adult theaters from operating within certain areas, finding that the regulation in question was a content-neutral time/place/manner restriction. The specific restriction at issue was established by Renton, Washington, and prohibited adult theaters within 1,000 feet from any residential zone, single- or multiple-family dwelling, church, park, or school.

== See also ==
- List of United States Supreme Court cases, volume 475
