= 2004 West Virginia Supreme Court of Appeals election =

- November 2, 2004
Nominee	Brent Benjamin	Warren McGraw
Party	Republican	Democratic
Popular vote	382,036	334,301
Percentage	53.33%	46.67%
- Results by county Benjamin: 50–60% 60–70% 80–90% McGraw: 50–60% 60–70% 70–80%
Justice before election
Warren McGraw
Democratic
Elected Justice
Brent Benjamin
Republican

The 2004 West Virginia Supreme Court of Appeals election took place on November 2, 2004, to elect a justice of the Supreme Court of Appeals of West Virginia for the next 12 years.

Originally elected in 1998, incumbent Democratic Justice Warren McGraw had previously sought Justice George M. Scott's open seat which was up for election in 2000, and was a twelve year term which would expire in 2012. This was challenged in the state Supreme Court, and in a 4-1 decision, the Court held that McGraw was ineligible to run for a 12-year term in the year 2000 when he was already a member of the Court until the year 2004, and referred to his action as "audacious".

McGraw sought re-election to his seat for a second term, but was defeated in the general election by Republican nominee and Charleston attorney Brent Benjamin. This election result was widely attributed to Massey Energy CEO Don Blankenship's involvement in the election, spending $3.5 million to defeat McGraw.

Benjamin became the first Republican elected to the West Virginia Supreme Court in more than 80 years.

== Democratic primary ==
=== Candidates ===
==== Nominee ====
- Warren McGraw, incumbent Justice of the Supreme Court of Appeals.

==== Eliminated in primary ====
- Jim Rowe, Greenbrier County circuit judge and former West Virginia House of Delegates majority leader.

=== Results ===
May 11 Democratic primary
Party	Candidate	Votes	%
Democratic	Warren McGraw (incumbent)	147,030	56.72%
Democratic	Jim Rowe	112,191	43.28%
Total votes		259,221	100.00%

== Republican primary ==
=== Candidates ===
==== Nominee ====
- Brent Benjamin, Charleston attorney and former Treasurer of the West Virginia Republican Party.

==== Eliminated in primary ====
- Linda Rice, Huntington lawyer.

=== Results ===
May 11 Republican primary
Party	Candidate	Votes	%
Republican	Brent Benjamin	51,909	53.15%
Republican	Linda Rice	45,747	46.85%
Total votes		97,656	100.00%

== General election ==
=== Results ===
2004 West Virginia Supreme Court of Appeals election
Party	Candidate	Votes	%
Republican	Brent Benjamin	382,036	53.33%
Democratic	Warren McGraw (incumbent)	334,301	46.67%
Total votes		716,337	100.00%
Republican gain from Democratic			
