= Whitley v. Albers =

- Supreme Court of the United States

Decided March 4, 1986
- Full case name: Whitley v. Albers
- Citations: 475 U.S. 312 (more)

Holding
- Prison staff are not generally liable for the use of excessive force during prison disturbances such as a hostage situation where a guard is taken.

Court membership
- Chief Justice Warren E. Burger Associate Justices William J. Brennan Jr. · Byron White; Thurgood Marshall · Harry Blackmun; Lewis F. Powell Jr. · William Rehnquist; John P. Stevens · Sandra Day O'Connor

Whitley v. Albers, 475 U.S. 312 (1986), was a United States Supreme Court case in which the court held that prison staff are not generally liable for the use of excessive force during prison disturbances such as a hostage situation where a guard is taken.

== Background ==
During the course of a riot at the Oregon State Penitentiary, a prison officer was taken hostage and placed in a cell on the upper tier of a two-tier cellblock. In an attempt to free the hostage, prison officials worked out a plan that called for the prisoner security manager to enter the cellblock unarmed, followed by prison officers armed with shotguns. The security manager ordered one of the officers to fire a warning shot and to shoot low at any inmates climbing the stairs to the upper tier, since he would be climbing the stairs to free the hostage. One of the officers, after firing a warning shot, shot Gerald Albers in the left knee when he started up the stairs. Albers was an incarcerated person who was not involved in the hostage situation. Albers subsequently brought an action in federal district court against the prison officials pursuant to Section 1983, alleging, among other things, that they had deprived him of his rights under the Eighth and Fourteenth Amendments. At the conclusion of the trial, the district court directed a verdict for the officers. The Court of Appeals reversed and remanded for a new trial on Albers's Eighth Amendment claim.

== Opinion of the court ==
The court issued an opinion on March 4, 1986.

== Subsequent developments ==
As a result of this case, it has been very difficult to get a favorable judgment in any prison use of force case. A subsequent case expanded the use of the Whitley test to all allegations of excessive force by incarcerated people against prison staff, regardless of whether there were extenuating circumstances like a riot.
