= Matsushita Electric Industrial Co. v. Zenith Radio Corp. =

Matsushita v. Zenith Radio Corp.
- Supreme Court of the United States

Argued November 12, 1985 Decided March 26, 1986
- Full case name: Matsushita Electric Industrial Co., Ltd. v. Zenith Radio Corp.
- Citations: 475 U.S. 574 (more) 106 S. Ct. 1348; 89 L. Ed. 2d 538

Holding
- To survive a motion for a summary judgment, a plaintiff seeking damages for a violation of § 1 of the Sherman Act must present evidence "that tends to exclude the possibility" that the alleged conspirators acted independently, such that the inference of a conspiracy is reasonable in light of the competing inferences of independent action or collusive action that could not have harmed respondents.

Court membership
- Chief Justice Warren E. Burger Associate Justices William J. Brennan Jr. · Byron White; Thurgood Marshall · Harry Blackmun; Lewis F. Powell Jr. · William Rehnquist; John P. Stevens · Sandra Day O'Connor

Case opinions
- Majority: Powell, joined by Burger, Marshall, Rehnquist, O'Connor
- Dissent: White, joined by Brennan, Blackmun, Stevens

Laws applied
- Sherman Antitrust Act, Rule 56 of the Federal Rules of Civil Procedure

Matsushita Electric Industrial Co. v. Zenith Radio Corp., 475 U.S. 574 (1986), was an antitrust case decided by the Supreme Court of the United States. It raised the standard for surviving summary judgment to unambiguous evidence that tends to exclude an innocent interpretation. Specifically, the issue was whether there was a horizontal "agreement" between Matsushita Electric and other Japanese television manufacturers. The Court held that the evidence must tend to exclude the possibility of independent action to be sufficient to survive summary judgment.

== See also ==
- List of United States Supreme Court cases, volume 475
