= New York v. Class =

- Supreme Court of the United States

Argued November 4, 1985 Decided February 25, 1986
- Full case name: State of New York, Petitioner v. Benigno Class
- Citations: 475 U.S. 106 (more)

Holding
- Because of their role in identifying vehicles and plain view locations, a person has no expectation of privacy when police look for a VIN (as long as the police have reasonable suspicion beforehand).

Court membership
- Chief Justice Warren E. Burger Associate Justices William J. Brennan Jr. · Byron White; Thurgood Marshall · Harry Blackmun; Lewis F. Powell Jr. · William Rehnquist; John P. Stevens · Sandra Day O'Connor

Case opinions
- Majority: O'Connor, joined by Blackmun, Rehnquist, Burger
- Concurrence: Powell
- Concur/dissent: Brennan, Marshall, Stevens
- Dissent: White

Laws applied
- U.S. Const. amend. IV

New York v. Class, 475 U.S. 106 (1986), was a United States Supreme Court decision in which the Court held that a person has no reasonable expectation of privacy under the Fourth Amendment when police look for a vehicle identification numbers after they have developed reasonable suspicion.

== Background ==
During the afternoon of May 11, 1981, NYPD performing an unmarked vehicle patrol in the Bronx spotted Benigo Class driving a 1972 Dodge Charger with a broken windshield, and speeding 10 mph over the speed limit. After he pulled over, Class exited the car and handed Officer Meyer his insurance and registration; however, Class had no valid driver's license. Meyer's partner, Officer McNamee then proceeded to open the Charger's driver-side door to look for the VIN (until 1969, a VIN was located on a car's door jamb). Realizing the car was newer, Officer McNamee went to the windshield to look for the VIN on the dashboard. As various papers were on the dashboard, McNamee entered the car again to clear the obstructing documents. Shortly after removing the papers, McNamee spotted the handle of a .22 caliber pistol protruding from underneath a seat. Class was arrested for illegally carrying a handgun, driving without a license, and driving with a broken windshield.

=== Lower Court Proceedings ===
Class' motion to suppress was denied during trial. The appellate division of the New York Supreme Court upheld his conviction. However, the New York Court of Appeals reversed his conviction, and ruled that there was little to no justification for the officers to enter the vehicle as Class could have removed the papers himself.

== Opinion of the Court ==
In a 5–4 decision, the Court ruled that since a VIN had to legally be in plain view, there is no reasonable expectation of privacy. Furthermore, obstructing a VIN with papers does not create an expectation of privacy in the same way putting up "No Trespassing" signs on a marijuana growhouse does not create an expectation of privacy. Even though the NYPD officers performed a search when they removed a gun, Class could have stayed inside the vehicle, removed the papers, and provided his information to the officers. Since Officer McNamee only entered the vehicle to remove the papers obstructing the VIN, the search was unintrusive in this case. Additionally, the Court emphasized that if a dashboard VIN was visible from the outside of a vehicle, a police officer who enters a car to look for a VIN would be committing an unconstitutional search. Finally, the New York Court of Appeals decision did not stand on independent state ground as they mostly analyzed the United States Constitution rather than the Constitution of New York.
