= 1984 West Virginia Attorney General election =

- November 6, 1984
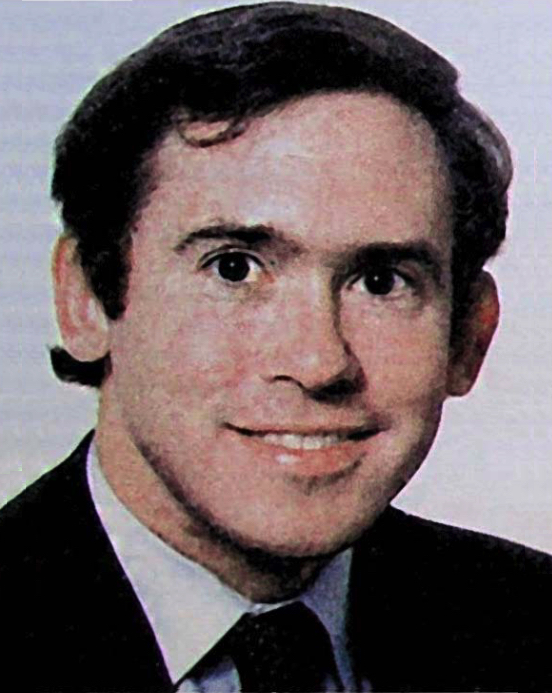

| Nominee | Charlie Brown | John F. McCuskey |
| Party | Democratic | Republican |
| Popular vote | 386,442 | 309,763 |
| Percentage | 55.51% | 44.49% |
- Brown: 50–60% 60–70% 70–80% McCuskey: 50–60% 60–70% 70–80%
Attorney General before election
Chauncey Browning
Democratic
Elected Attorney General
Charlie Brown
Democratic

The 1984 West Virginia Attorney General election took place on November 6, 1984, to elect the Attorney General of West Virginia. Incumbent Democratic Attorney General Chauncey H. Browning Jr. chose not to seek re-election to a fifth term, choosing instead to run for governor.

Charleston attorney and former Deputy Attorney General Charlie Brown beat Republican nominee John F. McCuskey 55.5% to 44.5%.

Forty years later, in 2024, John F. McCuskey's son JB was elected Attorney General, and Charlie Brown's brother Sherrod lost re-election to the U.S. Senate.

== Democratic primary ==
=== Candidates ===
==== Nominee ====
- Charlie Brown, Charleston attorney, former Deputy Attorney General (1978-1982), and brother of Sherrod Brown.

==== Eliminated in primary ====
- Daniel C. Staggers, Mineral County attorney, son of Harley Orrin Staggers, brother of Harley O. Staggers Jr., and future candidate for the Supreme Court of Appeals in 1996.
- John "Si" Boettner, State Senator from the 8th district and chairman of the Senate Judiciary Committee.

=== Polling ===
| Poll source | Date(s) administered | Sample size | Margin of error | Charlie Brown | Dan Staggers | John Boettner | Undecided |
|---|---|---|---|---|---|---|---|
| West Virginia Poll | April, 1984 | N/A | ± 5% | 15.4% | 35.5% | 21.7% | 27.4% |
| West Virginia Poll | May, 1984 | N/A | ± 5% | 19.8% | 36% | 17.8% | N/A |

=== Results ===
June 5, 1984 Democratic primary
| Party | Candidate | Votes | % |
|---|---|---|---|
| Democratic | Charlie Brown | 120,394 | 35.99% |
| Democratic | Daniel C. Staggers | 117,433 | 35.10% |
| Democratic | John "Si" Boettner | 96,701 | 28.91% |
| Total votes | | 334,528 | 100.00% |

== Republican primary ==
=== Candidates ===
==== Nominee ====
- John F. McCuskey, former member of the West Virginia House of Delegates from Harrison County (1973-1977) and father of future attorney general JB McCuskey.

=== Results ===
June 5, 1984 Republican primary
| Party | Candidate | Votes | % |
|---|---|---|---|
| Republican | John F. McCuskey | 107,405 | 100.00% |
| Total votes | | 107,405 | 100.00% |

== General election ==
=== Candidates ===
- Democratic: Charlie Brown.
- Republican: John F. McCuskey.

=== Results ===
1984 West Virginia Attorney General election
| Party | Candidate | Votes | % |
|---|---|---|---|
| Democratic | Charlie Brown | 386,442 | 55.51% |
| Republican | John F. McCuskey | 309,763 | 44.49% |
| Total votes | | 696,205 | 100.00% |
| Democratic hold | | | |

=== Results by county ===
| County | Charlie Brown Democratic | | John McCuskey Republican | | Total votes cast |
| County | # | % | # | % | Total votes cast |
|---|---|---|---|---|---|
| Barbour | 3,093 | 46.42% | 3,570 | 53.58% | 6,663 |
| Berkeley | 8,100 | 47.26% | 9,041 | 52.74% | 17,141 |
| Boone | 7,828 | 70.94% | 3,206 | 29.06% | 11,034 |
| Braxton | 3,676 | 63.28% | 2,133 | 36.72% | 5,809 |
| Brooke | 7,026 | 65.83% | 3,647 | 34.17% | 10,673 |
| Cabell | 21,598 | 59.63% | 14,624 | 40.37% | 36,222 |
| Calhoun | 1,778 | 58.45% | 1,264 | 41.55% | 3,042 |
| Clay | 2,505 | 69.45% | 1,102 | 30.55% | 3,607 |
| Doddridge | 934 | 30.01% | 2,178 | 69.99% | 3,112 |
| Fayette | 13,546 | 73.40% | 4,909 | 26.60% | 18,455 |
| Gilmer | 1,811 | 55.28% | 1,465 | 44.72% | 3,276 |
| Grant | 824 | 20.68% | 3,161 | 79.32% | 3,985 |
| Greenbrier | 7,501 | 60.45% | 4,908 | 39.55% | 12,409 |
| Hampshire | 2,545 | 49.89% | 2,556 | 50.11% | 5,101 |
| Hancock | 8,533 | 61.46% | 5,350 | 38.54% | 13,883 |
| Hardy | 2,124 | 54.29% | 1,788 | 45.71% | 3,912 |
| Harrison | 12,588 | 37.37% | 21,094 | 62.63% | 33,682 |
| Jackson | 5,824 | 52.50% | 5,269 | 47.50% | 11,093 |
| Jefferson | 4,846 | 53.70% | 4,179 | 46.30% | 9,025 |
| Kanawha | 48,237 | 55.24% | 39,083 | 44.76% | 87,320 |
| Lewis | 3,422 | 44.40% | 4,286 | 55.60% | 7,708 |
| Lincoln | 6,284 | 65.05% | 3,377 | 34.95% | 9,661 |
| Logan | 11,682 | 72.95% | 4,332 | 27.05% | 16,014 |
| Marion | 12,703 | 49.32% | 13,055 | 50.68% | 25,758 |
| Marshall | 8,991 | 56.24% | 6,996 | 43.76% | 15,987 |
| Mason | 7,061 | 58.83% | 4,942 | 41.17% | 12,003 |
| McDowell | 8,861 | 77.65% | 2,550 | 22.35% | 11,411 |
| Mercer | 12,061 | 55.23% | 9,777 | 44.77% | 21,838 |
| Mineral | 4,231 | 42.95% | 5,621 | 57.05% | 9,852 |
| Mingo | 9,179 | 76.09% | 2,885 | 23.91% | 12,064 |
| Monongalia | 14,002 | 53.91% | 11,969 | 46.09% | 25,971 |
| Monroe | 2,953 | 52.92% | 2,627 | 47.08% | 5,580 |
| Morgan | 1,599 | 38.48% | 2,556 | 61.52% | 4,155 |
| Nicholas | 5,579 | 63.67% | 3,184 | 36.33% | 8,763 |
| Ohio | 12,290 | 53.84% | 10,537 | 46.16% | 22,827 |
| Pendleton | 1,574 | 51.93% | 1,457 | 48.07% | 3,031 |
| Pleasants | 1,980 | 54.98% | 1,621 | 45.02% | 3,601 |
| Pocahontas | 2,293 | 55.63% | 1,829 | 44.37% | 4,122 |
| Preston | 4,219 | 41.93% | 5,842 | 58.07% | 10,061 |
| Putnam | 7,815 | 54.96% | 6,405 | 45.04% | 14,220 |
| Raleigh | 18,560 | 66.26% | 9,449 | 33.74% | 28,009 |
| Randolph | 5,349 | 50.37% | 5,271 | 49.63% | 10,620 |
| Ritchie | 1,574 | 35.91% | 2,809 | 64.09% | 4,383 |
| Roane | 3,146 | 51.80% | 2,927 | 48.20% | 6,073 |
| Summers | 3,400 | 64.28% | 1,889 | 35.72% | 5,289 |
| Taylor | 2,658 | 40.83% | 3,852 | 59.17% | 6,510 |
| Tucker | 1,952 | 51.22% | 1,859 | 48.78% | 3,811 |
| Tyler | 1,634 | 37.60% | 2,712 | 62.40% | 4,346 |
| Upshur | 3,107 | 38.14% | 5,040 | 61.86% | 8,147 |
| Wayne | 10,295 | 66.36% | 5,218 | 33.64% | 15,513 |
| Webster | 2,507 | 69.74% | 1,088 | 30.26% | 3,595 |
| Wetzel | 4,244 | 54.47% | 3,547 | 45.53% | 7,791 |
| Wirt | 1,181 | 53.27% | 1,036 | 46.73% | 2,217 |
| Wood | 15,977 | 45.18% | 19,386 | 54.82% | 35,363 |
| Wyoming | 7,162 | 68.42% | 3,305 | 31.58% | 10,467 |
| Totals | 386,442 | 55.51% | 309,763 | 44.49% | 696,205 |
