= Oliver D. Kessel =

American judge (1901–1992)

Oliver Dennis Kessel (January 12, 1901 – November 5, 1992) was a justice of the Supreme Court of Appeals of West Virginia from his appointment on June 23, 1972 until December 31, 1972.

Born in Ripley, West Virginia, Kessel received an A.B. degree from West Virginia University in 1924 and a J.D. from the same institution in 1928. He gained admission to the bar in West Virginia in 1928 and thereafter engaged in the private practice of law in Ripley from 1928 to 1929, and for most of the period from 1932 to 1956. He served as prosecuting attorney for Jackson County, West Virginia from 1929 to 1932, and was also elected as a Republican to serve as mayor of the City of Ripley from 1952 to 1953.

Kessel served as a judge of the 5th Judicial Circuit of West Virginia, in Jackson County, from 1956 to 1972, when Governor Arch Moore appointed him to a seat on the state supreme court vacated by the retirement of Justice Harlan M. Calhoun. Kessel served for six months, until the election of his successor. Following his own retirement from the court, Kessel returned to private practice in Ripley.

Kessel died of a heart attack at a hospital in Ripley, at the age of 91.

Political offices
Preceded by Harlan M. Calhoun	Justice of the Supreme Court of Appeals of West Virginia; 1972–1972	Succeeded by Richard Neely
