= Jamie Leigh Jones =

American advocate

Jamie Leigh Jones (born 1985) is a former employee of KBR, an American engineering, construction and private military contracting company. During her employment, KBR was a subsidiary of Halliburton from 1962 to 2007. She is notable for accusing then-fellow KBR employees of drugging and gang-raping her on July 28, 2005, at Camp Hope in Baghdad. A federal grand jury investigated her claims but issued no indictments.

Jones filed a civil suit against KBR and one of its former employees. The jury returned a verdict in favor of the defendants, finding that the sex between Jones and the employee was consensual, and that therefore no rape had occurred, and that KBR did not defraud her. Her case was one of those showcased in the HBO documentary Hot Coffee to show how mandatory arbitration from an employee contract restricts access to court systems, even in criminal cases.

== Jones' allegations ==
Jones began working for KBR as an administrative assistant when she was 19 and started working in Iraq on July 24, 2005.

According to Jones, on July 28, 2005, one of her fellow KBR employees offered her a drink containing a date rape drug, although a subsequent blood test did not detect any date rape drugs. Jones says that while she was unconscious, several men anally and vaginally gang raped her. She reported that when she awoke the next morning, she "found her body naked and severely bruised, with lacerations to her vagina and anus, blood running down her leg, her breast implants were ruptured, and her pectoral muscles torn" – which would later require reconstructive surgery. Upon walking to the rest room, she passed out again. The doctor who examined Jones gave the rape kit used to gather evidence from Jones to KBR/Halliburton security forces, and three hours later they turned the kit over to the U.S. government. According to Jones, in early 2007 a spokesperson at the State Department told her that photographs and doctor's notes were missing from the kit.

Jones alleged that KBR officials locked her in a trailer after she informed them of the rape and would not permit her to call her family. In her account, after a day of being locked in the trailer, a sympathetic guard gave her a cell phone and she called her father. It is then known that her father contacted U.S. Representative Ted Poe (R-TX) who contacted the State Department. Agents were dispatched from the U.S. Embassy in Baghdad and removed Jones from KBR custody. A 2006 investigation from the federal Equal Employment Opportunity Commission found that “The investigation credits Charging Party's testimony, that she was indeed sexually assaulted by one or more Respondent employees and physical trauma was apparent.

== Congressional testimony ==
On December 19, 2007, Jones testified before the Senate Committee on the Judiciary. Robert Scott (D-VA) stated that the DOJ "seems to be taking action with respect to enforcement of criminal laws in Iraq only when it is forced to do something by embarrassing media coverage." In a 2007 interview, Ted Poe, a former Texas judge, stated that the United States has jurisdiction over U.S. contractors when they are accused of committing a crime against a U.S. national in a federal enclave.

Jones testified again before the Judiciary Committee on October 7, 2009, concerning Senator Al Franken's amendment to the FY 2010 Defense Appropriation Bill, to restrict contracts with companies that use mandatory arbitration in their employment contracts. This measure was passed by the Senate, prompted by her case.

== Civil lawsuit ==
On May 16, 2007, Jones filed a civil lawsuit against the United States of America, KBR and former parent corporation Halliburton, and one of its former employees (one of the firefighters who had allegedly raped her). KBR asked the court to compel arbitration based on her employment contract. On September 15, 2009, the 5th Circuit Court of Appeals, in a 2–1 decision, ruled that Jones' lawsuit could proceed in court.

The trial began in the Southern District of Texas on June 14, 2011. Jones' attorney argued that KBR had known about widespread sexual harassment but had ignored it because the remedy was too expensive. The defense argued that Jones fabricated her story of being drugged and raped because she was embarrassed about the consensual sex and wanted to get out of her year-long contract with KBR three days after she arrived. Jones' first attending physician testified that Jones had not suffered damage to her breast implants or chest during the alleged attack.

On July 8, the jury returned a verdict that rejected all of Jones' claims, finding that the sex between Jones and the employee was consensual and therefore no rape had occurred, and that KBR did not defraud her. Jones said, "I just thought that the physical evidence would help. I guess the fact that my entire life was on display and (his) wasn't made a difference." Bolen, a KBR spokeswoman, said, "The outcome of this jury trial as judged by her peers is the same result that the State Department got in 2005; that the Justice Department found in 2008. We are deeply gratified that the justice system has worked."

KBR later filed a motion to recover more than $2 million in attorney fees and court costs. In the motion KBR states that Jones' hostile work environment and rape claims were fabricated and frivolous. In a subsequent ruling, the court held Jones liable for KBR's court costs of $145,000, but also determined that the case was not frivolous and therefore she was not liable for KBR's attorney fees.

== Personal life ==
Jones met aviation mechanic Joseph Kallan Daigl, a member of the United States Navy, in 2005. They married in September 2006.
