= Oliver E. Diaz Jr. =

American judge

Oliver E. Diaz Jr. (born December 16, 1959) is a former Presiding Justice on the Supreme Court of Mississippi representing District 2 Place 2. In 2008, he was defeated by Randy "Bubba" Pierce.

== Early life and education ==
Diaz graduated from Notre Dame High School in 1977 and received a Bachelor of Arts degree from the University of South Alabama in 1982. In 1985, he graduated from the University of Mississippi School of Law, and in 2004, he received an LLM from the University of Virginia School of Law.

== Career ==
Diaz practiced law on the Gulf Coast. He served in the Mississippi House of Representatives from District 116 representing Biloxi and D'Iberville for seven years from 1988 to 1994. During his tenure in the Legislature, he was a subcommittee Chairman for the Insurance Committee and for the Judiciary Committee. He was on the Ways and Means Committee and was Secretary for the Constitution Committee. He also served as City Attorney for the City of D'Iberville for four years. Justice Diaz was elected to the Court of Appeals in November 1994 and served in that position until March 2000, at which time he was appointed to the Supreme Court by Governor Ronnie Musgrove. In 2000, he was elected to the Supreme Court for an eight-year term beginning January 2001. Diaz lost his bid for re-election in 2008 to judge Randy "Bubba" Pierce.

== Bribery and tax evasion charges ==
After two years on the bench Diaz was indicted in 2003 on bribery and tax fraud charges, which he considers to be politically motivated. This was related to a case against Mississippi trial attorney Paul Minor. US District Attorney Dunnican "Dunn" Lampton, head of the US Southern District of Mississippi, prosecuted the case against Diaz allegedly at the behest of Republicans during the George W. Bush dismissal of U.S. attorneys controversy.

In 2005, he was acquitted of bribery charges for steering thousands of dollars from trial lawyers into his 2000 campaign. Less than a week after his acquittal on the bribery charges, the Department of Justice, with prosecuting attorney Lampton at the helm, unsealed and charged Diaz with tax evasion.

In 2006, Diaz was acquitted of the charges of tax evasion although his, wife, Jennifer pleaded guilty and received two years of probation. At the commencement of the criminal trial, Lampton filed a complaint with the Mississippi Commission on Judicial Performance. Leslie Lampton, a relative of Dunn Lampton, sat on the commission during the filing. The commission dismissed the complaint.

The criminal charges subsequently kept Diaz off the bench during much of his term. It has been speculated the charges were politically motivated to aid the Republican candidate in the upcoming elections. That speculation was a topic discussed in detail in the documentary film Hot Coffee.

John Grisham has cited the bribery and tax evasion charges against Diaz as inspiration for his novel The Appeal.

=== Lawsuit against Dunn Lampton and Leslie Lampton ===
Currently Oliver Diaz and his wife Jennifer have filed a lawsuit against Dunn Lampton and Leslie Lampton that they violated several laws when he provided the Diaz's tax records to the Mississippi Commission on Judicial Performance. The case is still pending.

=== Appearance in Hot Coffee ===
Oliver Diaz's career as a Supreme Court Justice for the State of Mississippi was the subject of one of the 4 cases discussed in the documentary film Hot Coffee. In particular the documentary focused on how the U.S. Chambers of Commerce funded campaigns against Diaz because of his resistance to tort reform.

== Personal life ==
Diaz is Roman Catholic. He is married to the former Jennifer Oestreich and is the father of two children.
