= John F. McCuskey =

American judge (born 1947)

Justice of the Supreme Court of Appeals of West Virginia
- In office January 12, 1998 – December 31, 1998
- Preceded by: Thomas McHugh
- Succeeded by: Warren McGraw

Member of the West Virginia House of Delegates from the 25th district
- In office 1973–1977 Serving with 3 others (Multi-member district)

Personal details
- Born: November 7, 1947 (age 78) Harrison County, West Virginia, U.S.
- Party: Republican
- Children: 2, including JB
- Education: West Virginia Wesleyan College (BA); University of Pennsylvania (BSEE); West Virginia University College of Law (JD)

John F. McCuskey (born November 7, 1947) is an American lawyer and politician who served for brief periods in the West Virginia State Legislature and on the Supreme Court of Appeals of West Virginia.

== Early life, education, and political career ==
Born and raised in Clarksburg, West Virginia, McCuskey received a B.A. in mathematics from West Virginia Wesleyan College, and a B.S.E.E. from the University of Pennsylvania. He was elected to the West Virginia House of Delegates in 1972, while he was still a student at the West Virginia University College of Law, sitting out one year of law school to pursue the office. He received his J.D. degree from WVU in 1973. As a legislator, McCuskey refused to accept the daily allowance offered to legislators during a special session of the legislature, on the basis that the work of the legislature should have been completed during its regular session.

McCuskey remained in the legislature for four years, during which time he served on committees addressing the state judiciary, agriculture and natural resources, constitutional revision, and state parks, and sponsored legislation to reconfigure the state's justice of the peace system. In 1976, he was the Republican candidate for West Virginia's 1st congressional district, running against incumbent Democrat Bob Mollohan.

== Legal career ==
McCuskey unsuccessfully ran for Attorney General in 1984. He served as West Virginia's Commissioner of Finance and Administration from 1985 to 1988, and later became a partner in the firm of Campbell Woods Bagley in Charleston. During this time, his trial practice concentrated on product liability and insurance defense. McCuskey was appointed by Republican Governor Cecil H. Underwood to fill a vacancy on the state supreme court caused by the retirement of Justice Thomas McHugh on January 12, 1998. McCuskey ran for the remainder of the expired term, and during the course of the campaign refused support from a political action committee fund set up by direct marketing mogul Benjamin Suarez, who was feuding with West Virginia Attorney General Darrell McGraw, the brother of McCuskey's opponent. On November 3, 1998, McCuskey was defeated by Warren McGraw in the election to fill the remainder of Justice McHugh's term, which expired on December 31, 2004. McCuskey served until December 31, 1998. During his time on the court, he authored 10 majority opinions and numerous concurrences and dissents.

In 1999, after his service on the Supreme Court, McCuskey co-founded Shuman, McCuskey & Slicer, PLLC.

== Personal ==
McCuskey has two children. His son JB McCuskey was elected West Virginia State Auditor in 2016. His daughter Liz is a tenured professor of law at the University of Massachusetts and is a preeminent national scholar in health law.

== Elections ==
1998 Supreme Court of Appeals Election
Primary election
Party	Candidate	Votes	%
Republican	John F. McCuskey (incumbent)	47,923	65.9%
Republican	John Yoder	24,843	34.1%
Total votes		72,766	100.0%
General election
Democratic	Warren McGraw	194,951	53.7%
Republican	John F. McCuskey (incumbent)	167,907	46.3%
Total votes		362,858	100.0%
Democratic gain from Republican			

Party political offices
Vacant Title last held by Joe Laurita, Jr.	Republican nominee for West Virginia Attorney General; 1984	Vacant Title next held by Robert James Gould
Legal offices
Preceded by Thomas McHugh	Justice for the Supreme Court of Appeals of West Virginia; 1998	Succeeded by Warren McGraw
