= Brent Benjamin =

American judge

Justice of the Supreme Court of Appeals of West Virginia
- In office January 1, 2005 – December 31, 2016
- Preceded by: Warren McGraw
- Succeeded by: Beth Walker

Personal details
- Born: July 3, 1957 (age 69) Marietta, Ohio, U.S.
- Education: Ohio State University

Brent D. Benjamin (born July 3, 1957) is an American attorney who previously served as a justice of the Supreme Court of Appeals of West Virginia. In 2004, he was the first Republican elected to the West Virginia Supreme Court in more than 80 years, defeating incumbent Justice Warren McGraw. In 2015, the West Virginia Legislature changed the election system for judicial officers to a non-partisan basis. In 2016, Benjamin placed fourth of four serious candidates in the non-partisan election, with 12% of the vote, and left the court in January 2017, to return to private practice.

== Biography ==
Justice Benjamin was born in Marietta, Ohio, and earned his Bachelor of Arts and Juris Doctor degrees from The Ohio State University. After graduating in 1984 he moved to Charleston, West Virginia, and has been a resident of West Virginia for the past 20 years. Before his election, he was a principal attorney with Robinson and McElwee, PLLC in Charleston, West Virginia. His 20-year practice at that firm involved general civil litigation in state and federal courts, including toxic torts and complex litigation. His civil rights practice focused on protecting children from physical and sexual abuse. He was elected to the West Virginia Supreme Court of Appeals in the 2004 election. Benjamin received 53% of the votes, McGraw received 47%. He began a 12-year term on January 1, 2005 and served a one-year term as Chief Justice under the Court's rotation scheme in 2009. In 2013, he was appointed to a second one-year term as chief justice. He is married, and has five children.

He has practiced in the U.S. Court of Appeals for the Fourth Circuit, the U.S. District Court for the Southern District of West Virginia, the Supreme Court of Appeals of West Virginia, and the Kentucky Supreme Court. He is a 1999 graduate of Leadership West Virginia. He is also a current member of the Hocking College Archaeological Mission, and has participated in archaeological excavations in the United States and Egypt.

During the 2004 judicial campaign, Massey Energy CEO Don Blankenship spent $3 million through a legally-crafted independent expenditure committee to defeat sitting West Virginia Supreme Court Justice Warren McGraw, whom Benjamin was challenging.

In April 2008, Benjamin became involved when the case relating to Blankenship's company (Caperton v. A.T. Massey Coal Co.) came before the West Virginia Supreme Court of Appeals. Benjamin ruled that even if Caperton stood to prevail, the venue should rightfully be signed to Virginia since the contract between the parties involved a mining property in Virginia. Despite calls for Benjamin to recuse himself due to Blankenship's involvement in Benjamin's 2004 campaign, Benjamin remained on the case. Following the verdict, Harman Mining's owner, Hugh Caperton, appealed the case to the United States Supreme Court, which ruled in June 2009 that elected judges must recuse themselves from cases where exceptionally large campaign contributions from interested parties create the appearance of bias, and remanded the case to the West Virginia Supreme Court for a rehearing. Writing for the majority, Justice Anthony Kennedy called the appearance of conflict of interest so "extreme" that Benjamin's failure to recuse himself constituted a threat to the plaintiff's Constitutional right to due process under the Fourteenth Amendment. Chief Justice John Roberts's dissent warned that the majority's decision would have dire consequences for "public confidence in judicial impartiality."

On November 12, 2009, with a temporary justice replacing Benjamin, the West Virginia Supreme Court once again overturned the cases, ruling 4 to 1 that Caperton should have pursued his claims in Virginia under a clause in the contract at issue.

Legal offices
Preceded by Warren McGraw	Justice for the Supreme Court of Appeals of West Virginia; 2005–2016	Succeeded by Beth Walker
