= Arthur M. Recht =

American judge (1938–2018)

Arthur M. Recht (February 4, 1938 – October 28, 2018) was a justice of the Supreme Court of Appeals of West Virginia from May 26, 1995 to December 18, 1996. Recht formally resigned on October 15, 1996, but the Court issued an Administrative Order on the same date temporarily appointing him until December.

Born in Wheeling, West Virginia, Recht received a Bachelor's degree from the University of Pittsburgh, and a J.D. from the West Virginia University College of Law in 1962.

He was a judge of the First Judicial Circuit for Ohio County, West Virginia from 1981 until 1993 and again from 1996 until his retirement on January 31, 2012.

Recht was a Democrat. He died in 2018 from a stroke, at the age of 80.

== See also ==
- List of justices of the Supreme Court of Appeals of West Virginia

Political offices
Preceded by Richard Neely	Justice of the Supreme Court of Appeals of West Virginia; 1995–1996	Succeeded by Spike Maynard
