= Richard Neely =

American judge (1941–2020)

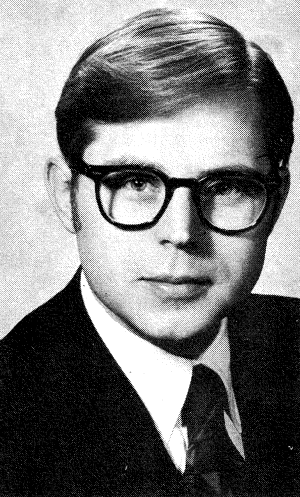
- Born: August 2, 1941; Los Angeles, California, U.S.
- Died: November 8, 2020 (aged 79); Charleston, West Virginia, U.S.
- Education: Dartmouth College (BA); Yale University (LLB)
- Occupations: Lawyer, author, professor, West Virginia Supreme Court justice
- Employer(s): Neely & Callaghan
- Known for: Analysis of the how courts work within the larger political, economic and social system. Pioneer work in domestic law that took into account relative bargaining positions of the parties and the disparities in capacities to litigate.
- Term: 22 years
- Predecessor: Oliver D. Kessel
- Successor: Arthur M. Recht
- Board member of: Advisory Board, Bureau of National Affairs (BNA) Class Action Litigation Report, 2000–2020
- Spouse: Carolyn Elmore Neely
- Children: John Champ Neely, II, M.D.; Charles Whittaker Neely, Esq.
- Parent(s): John Champ Neely and Elinore Forlani Neely
- Website: http://www.neelycallaghan.com/richard-neely/4423912

Richard Forlani Neely (August 2, 1941 – November 8, 2020) was a justice and chief justice of the West Virginia Supreme Court of Appeals from 1973 to 1995. When he took office, he became the youngest judge of a court of last resort in the English-speaking world in the 20th century.

== Early life and education ==
Neely was born in Los Angeles, California. He graduated in 1964 from Dartmouth College, in economics. In 1967 he graduated from Yale Law School. From 1968 to 1969, Neely served as an army artillery captain in Vietnam, where he was assigned to the staff of John Paul Vann and then to the staff of Ambassador Charles S. Whitehouse. Among other duties, Neely supervised the economic development program for a quarter of South Vietnam and then wrote the economic development section of the 1969 American pacification plan. He was awarded the Bronze Star. He was the grandson of Matthew M. Neely, who served as both Governor of West Virginia and a U.S. Senator.

== Legal career ==
Upon returning to civilian life, Neely started his own law practice in Fairmont, West Virginia and in 1970 was elected to the West Virginia House of Delegates. Thereafter, he was elected state-wide as a Democrat to the West Virginia Supreme Court of Appeals. As a supreme court justice, Neely led reform of the State mental hospitals and juvenile penal schools. Decisions written by him extended greater protections to mental patients, and wiped out the old, brutal state reform school system for both boys and girls, forcing the substitution of real therapeutic models.

Neely was known for his pioneering work in domestic law. Decisions he wrote for the Court, along with his books and articles, created the foundation for the child custody sections of the American Law Institute's Principles of the Law of Family Dissolution. From 1980 until his retirement from the Court in 1995, Neely was among the best-known judges in the United States: he wrote regularly for national publications such as The Atlantic Monthly, The New Republic, and The Wall Street Journal. Neely's scholarly work usually involved the sociology of courts. His oft-reprinted cover article for the August 1982 Atlantic Monthly, "The Politics of Crime", explained, for example, that criminal courts are more incompetent than they should be because criminal judges are also civil judges and civil defendants, like insurance companies, actively lobby to keep courts as incompetent as possible to make it harder for civil plaintiffs to sue them.

Neely's best-known book, How Courts Govern America was written at the height of judicial activism. Frankly admitting that he was a restrained judicial activist, Neely explained the practical and political limits to courts' powers, making his book an important contribution to arguments for judicial restraint. The book remains in print.

Neely always maintained an active interest in teaching: He was one of the first American professors to teach law in China in 1984 when China opened up; he served as Atherton Lecturer at Harvard; and, for over a decade he was professor of economics at the University of Charleston. On April 15, 1995, Neely retired from the West Virginia Supreme Court of Appeals and returned to private practice, starting the firm of Neely & Hunter (now Neely & Callaghan) in Charleston, West Virginia.

Neely died on November 8, 2020, in Charleston of liver cancer, aged 79.

=== Controversies ===
In 1985 while serving a rotation as Chief Justice, Neely dismissed his secretary, Tess Dineen from her job because she wanted to stop baby-sitting his 4-year-old son. While Neely defended his right to order his staff to perform duties such as baby-sitting, collecting his laundry, and typing books he has written, he stepped down as Chief Justice before his rotation ended.

In 1989 he sued Trans World Airlines for $38,000 after his baggage arrived 70 minutes late at New York's John F. Kennedy International Airport. Neely had flown from Seattle, Washington, to New York to appear on a television program, 20/20. In his suit, he sought $3,000 from TWA as a speaker's fee because he informed fellow passengers about the delay. He settled out of court for $12,500.

Neely received national attention for controversial remarks at American Legion youth leadership conferences. In 1989 he told the conference, "It's time for citizens like you and me to go home and get our baseball bats" to attack drug dealers. In 1990 Neely told the all-male conference that society would be better off if women stayed home with their children. He said drinking, womanizing and fighting in wars are all right until men have a family. At the same conference he stated that he "wouldn't work within 500 yards of a person with the AIDS virus."

== Bibliography ==
Neely's other major publications include:

- "Why Wage-Price Guidelines Failed: A General Theory of the Second Best Approach to Inflation Control", 79 W. Va. Law Review 1, (1976)
- How Courts Govern America, Yale University Press, (New Haven and London, 1981)
- "The Politics of Crime", The Atlantic Monthly (cover story), August 1982, pp. 27–31
- Why Courts Don't Work, McGraw-Hill (New York, 1983)
- The Divorce Decision, McGraw-Hill (New York, 1984)
- "The Primary Caretaker Parent Rule: Child Custody and the Dynamics of Greed", Yale Law and Policy Review 3 (1985)
- Judicial Jeopardy: When Business Collides with the Courts, (Addison-Wesley, 1986)
- The Product Liability Mess, The Free Press (New York, 1988)
- Take Back Your Neighborhood: A Case for Modern-day "Vigilantism", Donald I. Fine, Inc., (New York, 1990)
- Tragedies of Our Own Making, University of Illinois Press (Champaign, Illinois, 1994)
- "Insider Trading Prosecutions Under the Misappropriation Theory: New York's Joke on Heartland America" (1994 WL 267860) (1994)

== See also ==
- List of justices of the Supreme Court of Appeals of West Virginia

Legal offices
Preceded by Oliver D. Kessel	Justice for the Supreme Court of Appeals of West Virginia; 1973–1995	Succeeded by Arthur M. Recht
