= Hot Coffee (film) =

- Directed by: Susan Saladoff
- Produced by: Susan Saladoff; Carly Hugo; Alan Oxman; co-producer: Rebecca Saladoff
- Cinematography: Martina Radwan
- Edited by: Cindy Lee
- Music by: Michael Mollura; Joel Goodman
- Distributed by: HBO
- Release date: June 27, 2011
- Running time: 86 minutes
- Country: United States
- Language: English

Hot Coffee is a 2011 documentary film that analyzes and discusses the impact of tort reform on the United States judicial system. It is directed by Susan Saladoff, who has practiced as a medical malpractice attorney for at least 26 years. The film premiered at the 2011 Sundance Film Festival on January 24, 2011, and later aired on HBO on June 27, 2011, as a part of HBO films documentary summer series. The title is derived from the Liebeck v. McDonald's Restaurants lawsuit, in which the plaintiff Liebeck was severely burned after spilling into her lap hot coffee purchased from a McDonald's.

== Cases discussed ==
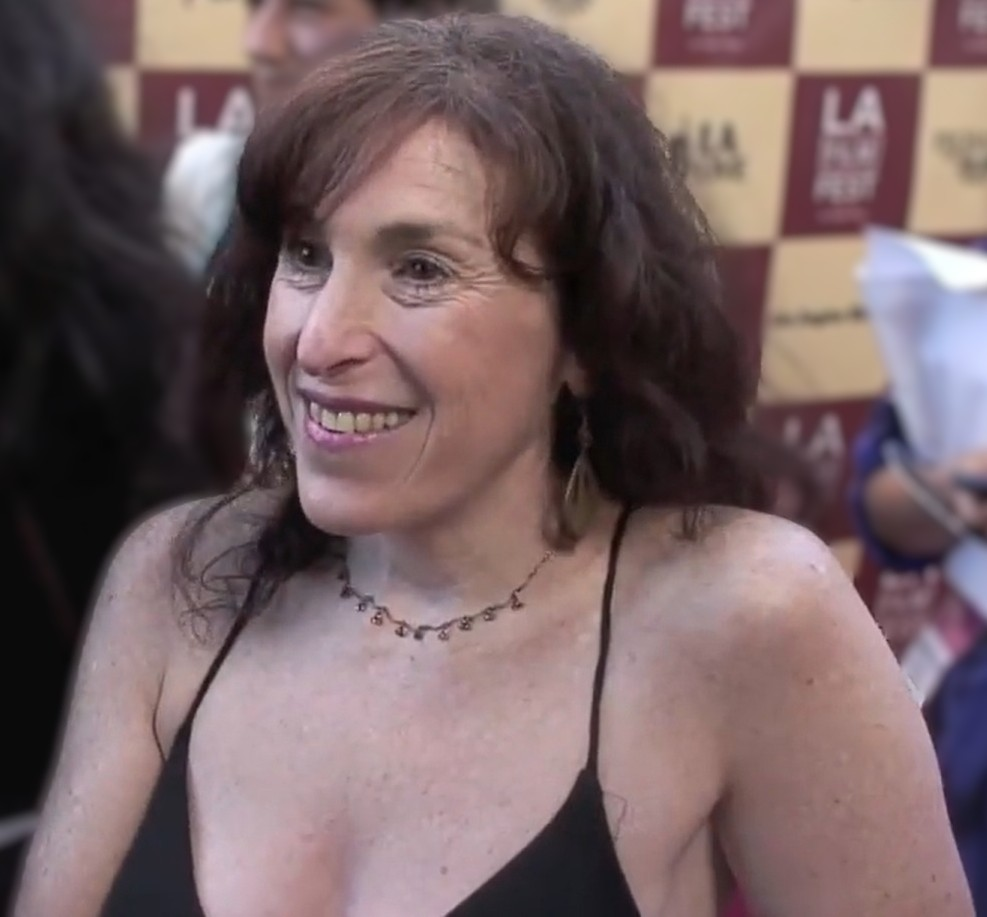
Director Susan Saladoff in 2011

Hot Coffee discusses several cases and relates each to tort reform in the United States:

1. Liebeck v. McDonald's Rests., No. CV-93-02419, 1995 WL 360309 (N.M. 2d Jud. Dist. Aug. 18, 1994) (judgment awarding Liebeck $2.86 million in "hot coffee" case), vacated, 1994 WL 16777704 (Nov. 28, 1994): how tort cases are publicized to instigate tort reform.
2. Gourley v. Neb. Methodist Health Sys., 663 N.W.2d 43 (Neb. 2003) (upholding Nebraska's statutory cap of $1.25 million on damages in medical malpractice actions).
3. Prosecutions of then–Mississippi Supreme Court Presiding Justice Oliver E. Diaz Jr. for bribery: how judges were elected for their positive stance on tort reform and were influenced by campaign contributions. The U.S. Chamber of Commerce (not a United States government agency, but a lobbying group for businesses) funded negative campaign ads against judicial candidate Oliver E. Diaz and in support of candidate Keith Starrett. Oliver E. Diaz estimates ~$1,000,000+ dollars was spent on Keith Starrett's behalf for the judicial election.
4. Jones v. Halliburton Co., 625 F. Supp. 2d 339 (S.D. Tex. 2008) (refusing to enforce mandatory arbitration of Jones's employment contract with respect to her claims of assault and battery, intentional infliction of emotional distress, negligent hiring, retention, and supervision, and false imprisonment), aff'd, 583 F.3d 228 (5th Cir. 2009)

== Liebeck v. McDonald's Restaurants ==
This segment features interviews with Liebeck's family and focuses on their perspective of the trial. This included news clips, comments from celebrities and politicians about the case, as well as myths and misconceptions, including how many people thought she was driving when the incident occurred and thought that she suffered only minor superficial burns, while in truth she suffered severe burns and needed extensive surgeries. The concept of accountability is also discussed. The film also discussed in great depth how Liebeck v. McDonald's Restaurants is often used and misused to describe a frivolous lawsuit and referenced in conjunction with tort reform efforts. It argued that corporations have spent millions distorting certain tort cases in order to promote tort reform.

== Jamie Leigh Jones v. Halliburton Co. ==
Senator Al Franken features prominently in this segment. He worked closely with Jamie Leigh Jones to get her case heard in court and proposed legislative changes to mandatory arbitration clauses. Subsequent to the film's release, Jones succeeded in trying her civil case before a federal court in Houston. However, she was unsuccessful in convincing a jury that she had been raped or that KBR (then part of Halliburton) had engaged in fraud when inducing her to sign her employment contract. There was a long list of inconsistencies and contradictions exposed in her story during the trial.
