= Spike Maynard =

American judge

Justice of the Supreme Court of Appeals of West Virginia
- In office January 1, 1997 – December 31, 2008
- Preceded by: Arthur M. Recht
- Succeeded by: Menis Ketchum

Judge of 30th Circuit Court of West Virginia
- In office 1981–1996
- Appointed by: Jay Rockefeller

Personal details
- Born: December 8, 1942 Williamson, West Virginia, U.S.
- Died: May 1, 2014 (aged 71) Charleston, West Virginia, U.S.
- Education: Florida Southern College; West Virginia University College of Law

Elliott E. "Spike" Maynard (December 8, 1942 – May 1, 2014) was an American lawyer and former judge from West Virginia. In 1996 he was elected as a Democrat to the Supreme Court of Appeals of West Virginia. A judge of West Virginia's 30th Judicial Circuit for over 16 years, he was elected as a Democrat to a 12-year term on the Supreme Court of Appeals of West Virginia in 1996.

In 2010, Maynard switched parties and won the Republican nomination to challenge longtime Democratic U.S. Representative Nick Rahall in West Virginia's 3rd congressional district. On November 2, 2010, Maynard was defeated in his election bid in the second-closest election in Rahall's political history.

== Early life, education, and legal career ==
Maynard served in the United States Air Force Reconnaissance Group from 1961 to 1966. He received his Bachelor of Science from Florida Southern College in 1967. He served as the managing director of the Tug Valley Chamber of Commerce from 1968 to 1970. Maynard attended the West Virginia University College of Law and received his J.D. in 1974.

Maynard was an attorney in private practice from 1974 and 1981, and also served as the prosecuting attorney for Mingo County from 1976 to 1981.

== Judicial career ==
Maynard was appointed a judge of the 30th Judicial Circuit in 1981. He was elected in 1981 and subsequently reelected. He served on the court until 1997.

In 1996, he was elected to a 12-year term as a justice of the Supreme Court of Appeals of West Virginia. Maynard served as an associate justice until 2000, when he became the Chief Justice for a one-year term. In 2001 Maynard returned to associate justice status. The five justices of the Supreme Court of Appeals of West Virginia rotate, with limited exceptions, the role of Chief Justice on a one-year term basis.

=== Massey Energy controversy ===
In November 2007, Maynard voted with the majority in a 3–2 decision to reverse a $76 million judgment against Massey Energy. The judgment ($55 million plus interest) had been awarded by a Boone County jury to Harman Mining, a West Virginia coal company owned by Hugh M. Caperton.

After the Supreme Court reversed the judgment, Caperton's attorneys learned that Maynard had vacationed in the French Riviera with Don Blankenship, the CEO, chairman, and president of Massey Energy, and photos of the trip emerged. Bruce Stanley, a Pittsburgh lawyer representing Caperton, said "It is beyond the realm of human comprehension that any judge could claim any semblance of impartiality when, before casting the deciding vote in a $76 million case, he accompanies the CEO of the litigant on a luxurious trip to the French Riviera."

On January 19, 2008, following intense public scrutiny, Maynard disqualified himself from the Massey appeal. The acting chief justice appointed Circuit Judge Don Cookman to sit on the court for Caperton's rehearing petition. On January 23, 2008, the Court voted 5–0 to rehear Caperton's appeal.

== Political campaigns ==
=== 2008 judicial campaign ===
Maynard's 12-year term expired in 2009. Maynard ran for re-election and was initially the strong favorite. However, in the May 13, 2008 primary election for two seats on the court, Maynard was defeated, coming in third behind former Supreme Court Justice Margaret Workman and Huntington trial lawyer Menis Ketchum. Maynard barely edged out a political novice and West Virginia University law professor Bob Bastress.

=== 2010 U.S. Congressional campaign ===
After switching his party affiliation to Republican, Maynard officially filed candidacy papers on February 1, 2010, to run for the U.S. House in the 3rd District of West Virginia. He won the party primary with 30.1% of the vote against three other candidates. Maynard has said that his campaign "is about protecting the coal industry, including all the jobs associated with it." Rahall defeated Maynard in the November general election.

== Death ==
Maynard died at Charleston Area Medical Center in Charleston, West Virginia on May 1, 2014, following complications from pneumonia.

== Electoral history ==
2008 West Virginia Democratic primary election for Supreme Court of Appeals of West Virginia
Party	Candidate	Votes	%	±%
Democratic	Margaret Lee Workman	180,599	30.68	
Democratic	Menis E. Ketchum	135,563	23.03	
Democratic	Elliot E. Maynard	97,409	16.55	
Democratic	Robert M. Bastress	88,490	15.03	

2010 Republican primary election for West Virginia's 3rd congressional district
Party	Candidate	Votes	%	±%
Republican	Elliott E. Maynard	5,056	30.1	
Republican	Marty Gearheart	4,623	27.5	
Republican	Conrad Gale Lucas II	4,238	25.2	
Republican	Lee Allen Bias	2,906	17.2	

Legal offices
Preceded by Arthur M. Recht	Justice for the Supreme Court of Appeals of West Virginia; 1997–2008	Succeeded by Menis Ketchum
