= 1996 West Virginia Supreme Court of Appeals special election =

Election in West Virginia, US

- November 5, 1996
Nominee	Robin Davis	David M. Pancake
Party	Democratic	Republican
Popular vote	318,955	217,772
Percentage	59.43%	40.57%
Justice before election
Franklin Cleckley
Democratic
Elected Justice
Robin Davis
Democratic

The 1996 West Virginia Supreme Court of Appeals special election took place on November 5, 1996, to elect a Justice of the Supreme Court of Appeals of West Virginia for the next four years. The election was held to complete the unexpired term of Democratic Justice Thomas B. Miller, who retired in August 1994. Democratic governor Gaston Caperton appointed Franklin Cleckley to fill the vacancy. Cleckley chose not to contest the election.

Democratic nominee and Charleston lawyer Robin Davis beat Republican nominee and Huntington attorney David M. Pancake.

== Democratic primary ==
=== Candidates ===
==== Nominee ====
- Robin Davis, Charleston lawyer.

==== Eliminated in primary ====
- Daniel C. Staggers, Keyser lawyer, son of Harley O. Staggers, brother of Harley O. Staggers Jr., and candidate for Attorney General in 1984.
- Booker T. Stephens, chief judge of the 8th judicial circuit from Welch.

==== Withdrew ====
- Franklin Cleckley, incumbent Justice of the Supreme Court of Appeals.

=== Results ===
May 14, 1996 Democratic primary
Party	Candidate	Votes	%
Democratic	Robin Davis	121,569	45.02%
Democratic	Daniel C. Staggers	93,658	34.68%
Democratic	Booker T. Stephens	54,813	20.30%
Total votes		270,040	100.00%

== General election ==
=== Results ===
1996 West Virginia Supreme Court of Appeals special election
Party	Candidate	Votes	%
Democratic	Robin Davis	318,955	59.43%
Republican	David M. Pancake	217,772	40.57%
Total votes		536,727	100.00%
Democratic hold			
