= George M. Scott (West Virginia judge) =

American judge (1929–2015)

Justice of the Supreme Court of Appeals of West Virginia
- In office Nov. 4, 1999 – December 31, 2000
- Preceded by: Margaret Workman
- Succeeded by: Joseph Albright

Judge of 5th Circuit Court of West Virginia
- In office 1972–1987

Personal details
- Born: August 5, 1929 Roane County, West Virginia, U.S.
- Died: November 10, 2015 (aged 86)
- Education: West Virginia University; West Virginia University College of Law

George M. Scott (August 5, 1929 – November 10, 2015) was a justice of the Supreme Court of Appeals of West Virginia. In November 1999, he was appointed by Republican Governor Cecil H. Underwood to the Supreme Court of Appeals to fill the vacancy created by the resignation of Justice Margaret Workman.

== Early life and education ==
Scott graduated from Walton High School in 1945. He served in the United States Army Air Corps from 1946 to 1949, attaining the rank of sergeant. Scott attended West Virginia University and West Virginia University College of Law, graduating with honors and serving as editor of the West Virginia Law Review.

== Legal career ==
After law school, Scott was a law clerk to U.S. District Court Judge Ben Moore for one year. Thereafter, he practiced law in the Spencer firm of Ryan & Scott. Scott served as Roane County Prosecuting Attorney from 1956 to 1964. Scott also held various offices in the West Virginia State Bar, including President-elect in 1972, when he was appointed as a circuit court judge in the Fifth Judicial Circuit. He was elected judge three times before retiring in 1987.

Then-Governor Cecil Underwood appointed him to the West Virginia Supreme Court on November 4, 1999. He served until December 31, 2000, after which he returned to practicing law in Spencer and was of counsel to the Charleston law firm of Carey, Scott and Douglas.

Legal offices
Preceded by Margaret Workman	Justice for the Supreme Court of Appeals of West Virginia; 1999–2000	Succeeded by Joseph Albright
