= Joseph Albright =

American judge

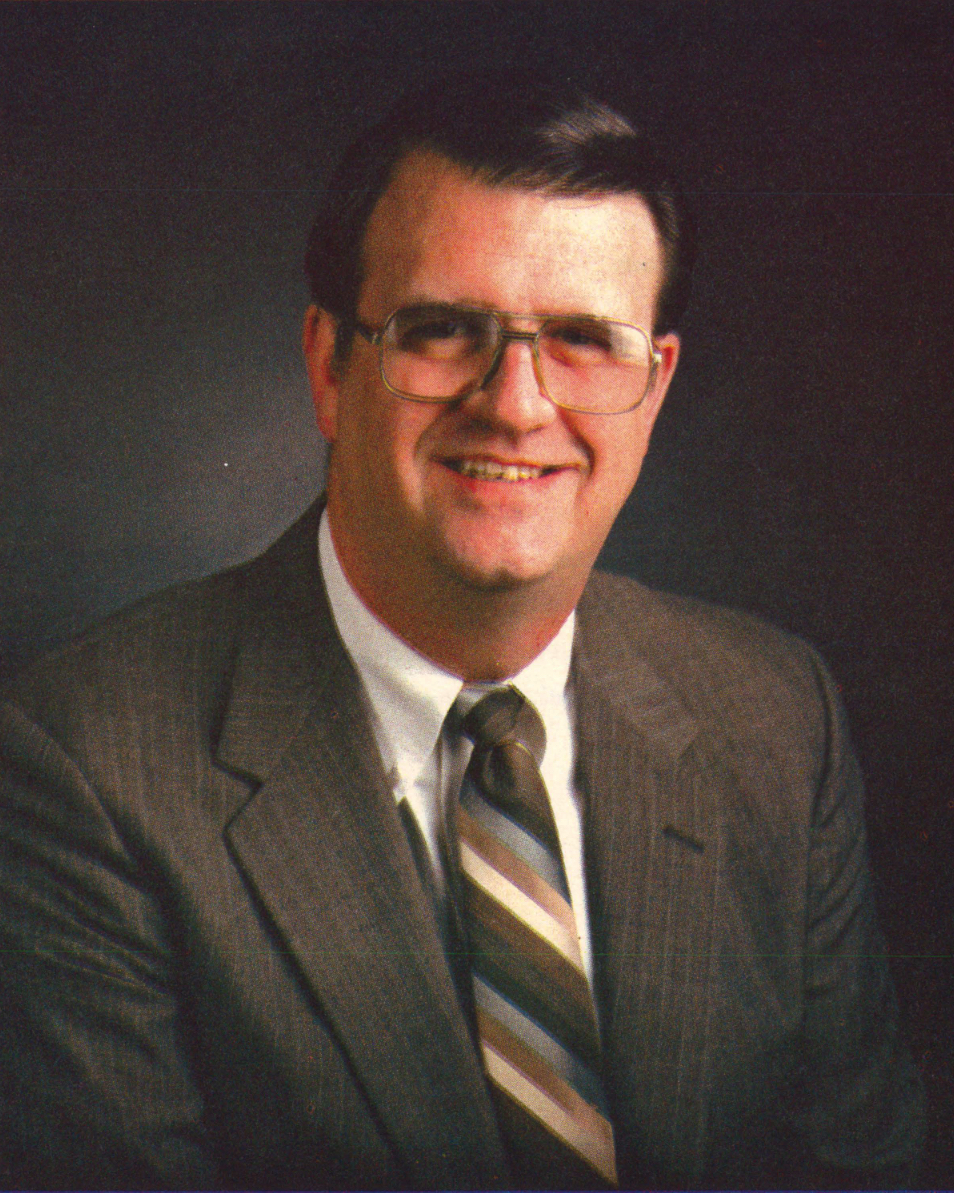

Justice of the Supreme Court of Appeals of West Virginia
- In office January 1, 2001 – March 20, 2009
- Preceded by: George M. Scott
- Succeeded by: Thomas McHugh
- In office September 26, 1995 – December 31, 1996
- Appointed by: Gaston Caperton
- Preceded by: William T. Brotherton Jr.
- Succeeded by: Larry Starcher

49th Speaker of the West Virginia House of Delegates
- In office 1985–1987
- Preceded by: Clyde See
- Succeeded by: Chuck Chambers

Personal details
- Born: November 8, 1938 Wood County, West Virginia, U.S.
- Died: March 20, 2009 (aged 70) Pittsburgh, Pennsylvania, U.S.
- Party: Democratic
- Spouse(s): Patricia Ann Deem; Nancie Gensert Divvens
- Education: University of Notre Dame (BBA); Notre Dame Law School

Joseph P. Albright (November 8, 1938 – March 20, 2009) was an American jurist who first served on the Supreme Court of Appeals of West Virginia from 1995 to 1996. In November 2000, he was elected to the Supreme Court of Appeals for a full 12-year term. He served from January 2001 until his death in 2009.

== Personal ==
Albright was born in Wood County, West Virginia. He married Patricia Ann Deem in 1958; they had four children, Theresa Albright Cavi, Lettie K. Albright Muckley (deceased), Joseph P. Albright Jr. and John P. Albright (deceased). In 1995, a widower, Albright married Nancie Gensert Divvens, becoming stepfather to her three adult children. Albright attended St. Francis Xavier Catholic Church in Parkersburg.

== Education ==
Justice Albright earned a Bachelor of Business Administration degree, cum laude, from the University of Notre Dame and his law degree from the Notre Dame Law School, where he won the Webber Prize for Appellate Advocacy and was a member of the Notre Dame Law Review.

== Career ==
Albright practiced law in Parkersburg and surrounding counties from 1962 until September 1995. In September 1995, then-Governor Gaston Caperton appointed him to an unexpired term on the Supreme Court of Appeals. He served through December 1996. After his former service on the Court, he resumed his law practice in Parkersburg and Charleston. Since 1959, he has been an officer and director of Albright's of Belpre, Inc., a family corporation which owns and operates Belpre Furniture, a retail furniture business with locations in Belpre, Ohio and Parkersburg.

A former assistant prosecuting attorney of Wood County and former city attorney for the City of Parkersburg, Justice Albright was elected to the West Virginia House of Delegates in 1970 and to six more terms commencing in 1974. He served as Chairman of the House Education Committee (1977–78), Chairman of the House Judiciary Committee (1979–84), and as 52nd Speaker of the House of Delegates in 1985 and 1986. He served on a number of boards and commissions, including the Parkersburg Charter Board from 1969 to 1970, when the city adopted a new charter.

== Final illness ==
On September 10, 2008, then-Chief Justice Maynard named former justice Thomas McHugh to temporarily replace Justice Albright, who took medical leave after being diagnosed with esophageal cancer. Albright died in Pittsburgh, Pennsylvania, aged 70.

Legal offices
Preceded by William T. Brotherton Jr.	Justice for the Supreme Court of Appeals of West Virginia; 1995–1996	Succeeded by Larry Starcher
Preceded by George M. Scott	Justice for the Supreme Court of Appeals of West Virginia; 2001–2009	Succeeded by Thomas McHugh
