= Warren McGraw =

American judge (1939–2023)

Judge of 27th Circuit Court of West Virginia
- In office January 1, 2009 – June 21, 2021

Justice of the Supreme Court of Appeals of West Virginia
- In office January 1, 1999 – December 31, 2004
- Preceded by: John F. McCuskey
- Succeeded by: Brent Benjamin

President of the West Virginia Senate
- In office January 14, 1981 – January 16, 1985
- Preceded by: William T. Brotherton Jr.
- Succeeded by: Dan R. Tonkovich

Personal details
- Born: May 10, 1939 Wyoming County, West Virginia, U.S.
- Died: June 14, 2023 (aged 84)
- Spouse: Peggy Shufflebarger
- Children: 3
- Education: Morris Harvey College; Wake Forest University School of Law

Warren Randolph McGraw (May 10, 1939 – June 14, 2023) was an American lawyer, politician, and judge in West Virginia and brother of former West Virginia Attorney General Darrell McGraw.

== Personal life ==
Warren McGraw was born in Wyoming County, West Virginia, United States, on May 10, 1939. After graduating from the Wyoming County public school system, McGraw attended Morris Harvey College (now the University of Charleston) where he earned his Artium Baccalaureus in 1960. McGraw then attended West Virginia University Graduate School and later Wake Forest University law school where he earned his Juris Doctor in 1963. In 1961, McGraw married Peggy Shufflebarger. They had three children and six grandchildren.

McGraw died on June 14, 2023, at the age of 84.

== Political career ==
McGraw began his political career in 1968 when he was elected to the West Virginia House of Delegates, serving there until 1972. He was then elected to the West Virginia Senate in 1972, serving three consecutive terms. During his third term, McGraw was then elected (twice) 44th Senate President. (Lt. Governor) In 1984, he decided to run for governor and in the Democratic primary challenged then-Speaker of the House Clyde M. See, State Attorney General Chauncey Browning, and State Highway Commissioner Dusty Rhodes. McGraw edged out Browning for second place but lost the primary to See.

After his service in the West Virginia Legislature, McGraw returned to Wyoming County to practice law where he was elected to the Board of Education in 1986 and later as Prosecuting Attorney in 1996. In 1998 McGraw successfully campaigned for an unexpired six-year term in the Supreme Court of Appeals of West Virginia. Although he was elected for a term ending in the year 2004, he filed as a candidate in the year 2000 for the term ending in 2012. Charleston lawyer George Carenbauer, a former state Democratic chairman, challenged the filing in the state Supreme Court, and in a 4–1 decision, the Court held that McGraw was ineligible to run for a 12-year term in the year 2000 when he was already a member of the Court until the year 2004, and referred to his action as "audacious". McGraw was elected by his peers on the Court as the Chief Justice during the 2001 term.

McGraw was defeated for reelection by Brent Benjamin in the 2004 election. Afterwards, McGraw filed a lawsuit against Charleston attorney George Carenbauer and West Virginia Media Holdings over a campaign ad which McGraw claimed portrayed his speech during the 2004 United Mine Workers of America's Labor Day rally in Racine, West Virginia in an unfair light. The speech, sometimes referred to as the "Scream at Racine" or the "Scream from Racine", was featured in several campaign ads run by both the West Virginia Republican Party and the Benjamin campaign. However, the suit was dismissed in July 2005.

In 2008 and 2016 McGraw successfully ran for a Circuit Court Judge post which he won both times and received over 80 percent of the vote.

Political offices
Preceded by William T. Brotherton Jr.	President of the West Virginia Senate; 1981–1985	Succeeded by Dan R. Tonkovich
Legal offices
Preceded by John F. McCuskey	Justice for the Supreme Court of Appeals of West Virginia; 1999–2004	Succeeded by Brent Benjamin
