= 2026 West Virginia Senate election =

- November 3, 2026

19 of 34 seats in the West Virginia Senate (17 regular, 2 special) 18 seats needed for a majority
	Majority party	Minority party
Leader	Randy Smith	Mike Woelfel (retiring)
Party	Republican	Democratic
Leader since	January 8, 2025	January 11, 2023
Leader's seat	14th–Preston	5th–Cabell
Last election	16 seats, 79.30%	1 seat, 19.61%
Seats before	32	2
Seats won	30	4
Seat change	▼2	▲2
Seats up	18	1
Races won	16	3
- Republican hold Democratic gain Democratic hold Republicans: 50–60% 60–70% 70–80% 90–100% Democrats: 50–60% Circular insets (Districts 3 and 17): special elections
Senate President before election
Randy Smith
Republican
Elected Senate President
TBD

The 2026 West Virginia Senate election was held on November 3, 2026, alongside the other 2026 United States elections. Voters elected half the members of the West Virginia Senate to serve a four-year term. Two other Senate seats will hold special elections. Primary elections were held on May 12, 2026.

As of November 1, 2025, there were 34 active candidacies for the 2026 state senate election. Candidate filing for office ended on January 31, 2026, with Republicans filing in all 17 regular elections and both specials, and with Democrats filing in 15 regular elections and one special.

Following the election, Democrats doubled the size of their caucus in the Senate, holding four seats, though Republicans retained their supermajority, holding 30 seats after the elections.

This election took place alongside races for U.S. Senate, U.S. House, state house, and numerous other state and local elections.

Map of the incumbents Republican incumbent Republican incumbent retiring or lost renomination Democratic incumbent retiring

== Crossover seat ==
Only one state senate district, District 5, voted for Republican presidential candidate Donald Trump in 2024 and a Democratic state senate nominee in the 2022 general election:

District	Delegate	Residence	Senate vote	Presidential vote
5th	Mike Woelfel	Huntington	D+12.0	R+24.7

== Appointments ==
According to §3-10-5 of West Virginia Code, vacancies in the state senate are filled through appointment by the governor of one of three candidates chosen by the executive committee of the outgoing member's party. Below is a list of appointments made during the 86th Legislature.

District	Incumbent		Party	Appointee		Ref.
District	Departing member	First elected	Party	Incoming member	Appt. date	Ref.
7th	Michael B. Stuart	2022	Rep	Zack Maynard	October 30, 2025	
17th	Eric Nelson	2020	Rep	Anne Charnock	February 4, 2025	

== Predictions ==
=== Statewide ===
Source	Ranking	As of
Sabato's Crystal Ball	Safe R	January 22, 2026
State Navigate	Safe R	February 10, 2026

=== Competitive districts ===
District	Incumbent	Last result	State Navigate (Note: Ratings simplified from percentages: <60% = "Tilt"; 60–75% = "Lean"; 75–95% = "Likely"; >95% = "Safe") February 10, 2026
1st	Laura Chapman	60.46% R	Likely R
5th	Mike Woelfel (retiring)	53.97% D	Likely R (flip)
8th	T. Kevan Bartlett	56.76% R	Likely R
13th	Mike Oliverio	50.29% R	Likely D (flip)
17th	Tom Takubo	58.45% R	Likely R
17th (special)	Anne Charnock	64.27% R	Likely R

== Results ==
=== By district ===
District	2024 Pres.	Incumbent				Candidates
District	2024 Pres.	Member	Party	First elected	Status	Candidates
1st	R+39.2	Laura Chapman	Republican	2022	Incumbent re-elected.	▌ ✓ Laura Chapman (Republican); ▌Shawn Fluharty (Democratic)
2nd	R+41.6	Charles H. Clements	Republican	2017 (app); 2018	Incumbent retired. Republican hold.	▌ ✓ Toby Heaney (Republican); ▌Chris Claypole (Democratic)
3rd	R+48.0	Mike Azinger	Republican	2016 (sp)	Incumbent re-elected.	▌ ✓ Mike Azinger (Republican); ▌Ronnie Green (Constitution); ▌Caci Petrehn (Democratic)
3rd (sp)	R+48.0	Trenton Barnhart	Republican	2026 (app)	Incumbent re-elected.	▌ ✓ Trenton Barnhart (Republican)
4th	R+49.8	Eric Tarr	Republican	2018	Incumbent re-elected.	▌ ✓ Eric Tarr (Republican); ▌~~Zachary Abbott (Democratic)~~; ▌~~Stephanie Butcher (Libertarian)~~
5th	R+24.7	Mike Woelfel	Democratic	2014	Incumbent retired. Democratic hold.	▌ ✓ DuRon Jackson (Democratic); ▌Chris Miller (Republican); ▌Glendon Watts (Constitution)
6th	R+62.2	Mark R. Maynard	Republican	2014	Incumbent re-elected.	▌ ✓ Mark Maynard (Republican); ▌Wyatt Lilly (Democratic)
7th	R+56.3	Zack Maynard	Republican	2025 (app)	Incumbent re-elected.	▌ ✓ Zack Maynard (Republican); ▌Cynthia Brake (Democratic); ▌Shawn M. Legg (Independent)
8th	R+27.4	T. Kevan Bartlett	Republican	2025 (app)	Incumbent lost renomination. Republican hold.	▌ ✓ Lance V. Wheeler (Republican); ▌Kim Hundley (Democratic)
9th	R+55.6	Rollan Roberts	Republican	2018	Incumbent re-elected.	▌ ✓ Rollan Roberts (Republican); ▌Christy Cardwell (Democratic)
10th	R+50.0	Vince Deeds	Republican	2022	Incumbent re-elected.	▌ ✓ Vince Deeds (Republican); ▌Kent Gilkerson (Democratic)
11th	R+54.1	Bill Hamilton	Republican	2018	Incumbent re-elected.	▌ ✓ Bill Hamilton (Republican); ▌Kevin Leon Carpenter (Democratic)
12th	R+47.2	Ben Queen	Republican	2022	Incumbent re-elected.	▌ ✓ Ben Queen (Republican); ▌Lynette Murray (Democratic)
13th	R+5.6	Mike Oliverio	Republican	2022	Incumbent retired. Democratic gain.	▌ ✓ John Williams (Democratic); ▌Mike Oliverio (Republican); ▌Taylor Richmond (Libertarian)
14th	R+59.5	Jay Taylor	Republican	2022	Incumbent re-elected.	▌ ✓ Jay Taylor (Republican); ▌Jason Armentrout (Democratic)
15th	R+45.9	Darren Thorne	Republican	2024 (app)	Incumbent re-elected.	▌ ✓ Darren Thorne (Republican); ▌Elizabeth Ferris (Democratic)
16th	R+23.6	Jason Barrett	Republican	2022	Incumbent re-elected.	▌ ✓ Jason Barrett (Republican); ▌Travis Bost (Libertarian)
17th	R+21.3	Tom Takubo	Republican	2014	Incumbent re-elected.	▌ ✓ Tom Takubo (Republican); ▌Wes Holden (Democratic)
17th (sp)	R+21.3	Anne Charnock	Republican	2025 (app)	Interim incumbent defeated. Democratic gain.	▌ ✓ Richie Robb (Democratic); ▌Anne Charnock (Republican)

== District 1 ==
District 1 election
Nominee	Laura Chapman	Shawn Fluharty
Party	Republican	Democratic
Incumbent Senator
Laura Chapman
Republican

District 1, highlighted in red

The first Senate district is located within the state's Northern Panhandle. Contained within the district are the entirety of the counties of Brooke, Hancock, and Ohio, along with portions of Marshall County. The largest municipality in the district is Wheeling; other communities within the district include Bethlehem, Chester, Follansbee, Hooverson, Wellsburg, and Weirton.

The incumbent for this seat is Laura Chapman, a Republican, first elected in 2022, winning the general election with 60.5 percent of the vote, flipping a Democratic-held seat. She is running for re-election. Republican nominee Donald Trump won this district with 68.7 percent of the vote in the 2024 presidential election.

=== Republican primary ===
==== Nominee ====
- Laura Chapman, incumbent senator

==== Eliminated in primary ====
- Joe Eddy, CEO

==== Endorsements ====
Laura Chapman

U.S. representatives

- David McIntosh, former IN-02 (1995–2001)

Statewide officials

- Patrick Morrisey, governor of West Virginia (2025–present)

Organizations

- School Freedom Fund
Joe Eddy

U.S. senators

- Shelley Moore Capito, West Virginia (2015–present)

Organizations

- West Virginia Chamber of Commerce

==== Fundraising ====
Campaign finance reports as of January 7, 2026
Candidate	Raised	Spent	Cash on hand
Laura Chapman (R)	$60,108.86	$7,271.72	$52,937.14
Joe Eddy (R)	$60,709.68	$24,858.47	$55,851.21
Source: West Virginia Secretary of State

==== Polling ====
Poll source	Date(s) administered	Sample size (Note: Key: A – all adults RV – registered voters LV – likely voters V – unclear)	Margin of error	Laura Chapman	Joe Eddy	Undecided
State Navigate	February 27–28, 2026	415 (LV)	± 4.8%	40%	15%	46%

==== Results ====
2026 West Virginia Senate election, 1st district (Republican primary)
Party	Candidate	Votes	%
Republican	Laura Chapman (incumbent)	4,054	59.24%
Republican	Joe Eddy	2,789	40.76%
Total votes		6,843	100.00%

=== Democratic primary ===
==== Nominee ====
- Shawn Fluharty, state delegate from the 5th district (2014–present)

==== Endorsements ====
Shawn Fluharty

Labor unions

- Communications Workers of America District 2-13

==== Results ====
2026 West Virginia Senate election, 1st district (Democratic primary)
Party	Candidate	Votes	%
Democratic	Shawn Fluharty	5,462	100.00%
Total votes		5,462	100.00%

=== General election ===
==== Post-primary endorsements ====
Shawn Fluharty (D)

U.S. senators

- Joe Manchin, West Virginia (2010–2025) (independent)

==== Polling ====
Poll source	Date(s) administered	Sample size	Margin of error	Laura Chapman (R)	Shawn Fluharty (D)	Other	Undecided
State Navigate	September 28–29, 2026	1,065 (LV)	± 3.3%	48%	43%	—	9%

==== Results ====
2026 West Virginia Senate election, 1st district
Party	Candidate	Votes	%	±%
Republican	Laura Chapman (incumbent)			
Democratic	Shawn Fluharty			
Total votes				

== District 2 ==
District 2 election
Nominee	Toby Heaney	Chris Claypole
Party	Republican	Democratic
Incumbent Senator
Charles H. Clements
Republican

District 2, highlighted in red

The second Senate district is located within the mid-Ohio Valley region. Contained within the district are the entirety of the counties of Doddridge, Tyler, and Wetzel, along with portions of the counties of Marion, Marshall, and Monongalia. The largest municipality in the district is Moundsville; other communities within the district include Cheat Lake, New Martinsville, and Paden City.

The incumbent for this seat is Charles H. Clements, a Republican, first appointed in 2017. He was re-elected to this seat in 2018 and 2022, winning the general election with 58.5 and 62.4 percent of the vote respectively. He has declined to run for re-election, instead endorsing attorney Bob Dobkin for the Republican nomination. Republican nominee Donald Trump won this district with 69.7 percent of the vote in the 2024 presidential election.

=== Republican primary ===
==== Nominee ====
- Toby Heaney, veteran and candidate for West Virginia's 76th house district in 2022 and 2024

==== Eliminated in primary ====
- Bob Dobkin, attorney

==== Declined ====
- Charles Clements, incumbent senator (endorsed Dobkin)

==== Endorsements ====
Bob Dobkin

U.S. senators

- Shelley Moore Capito, West Virginia (2015–present)

State legislators

- Charles Clements, state senator from the 2nd district (2017–present)
- Tom Takubo, former majority leader of the West Virginia Senate (2019–2025) from the 17th district (2015–present)

Organizations

- West Virginia Chamber of Commerce
Toby Heaney

U.S. representatives

- David McIntosh, former IN-02 (1995–2001)

State legislators

- Chris Rose, state senator from the 2nd district (2024–present)

Organizations

- Americans for Prosperity
- School Freedom Fund

==== Fundraising ====
Campaign finance reports as of January 7, 2026
Candidate	Raised	Spent	Cash on hand
Charles H. Clements (R)	$5,600.00	$5,600.00	$0.00
Bob Dobkin (R)	$16,186.91	$2,204.04	$13,982.87
Toby Heaney (R)	$17,352.67	$11,027.84	$10,324.83
Source: West Virginia Secretary of State

==== Polling ====
Poll source	Date(s) administered	Sample size	Margin of error	Bob Dobkin	Toby Heaney	Undecided
State Navigate	April 27–29, 2026	381 (LV)	± 5.0%	28%	29%	43%
State Navigate	April 27–29, 2026	381 (LV)	± 5.0%	33% (Note: With voters who lean towards a given candidate)	36%	31%

==== Results ====
2026 West Virginia Senate election, 2nd district (Republican primary)
Party	Candidate	Votes	%
Republican	Toby Heaney	3,729	54.61%
Republican	Bob Dobkin	3,100	45.39%
Total votes		6,829	100.00%

=== Democratic primary ===
==== Nominee ====
- Chris Claypole

==== Endorsements ====
Chris Claypole

Labor unions

- Communications Workers of America District 2-13

==== Fundraising ====
Campaign finance reports as of January 7, 2026
Candidate	Raised	Spent	Cash on hand
Chris Claypole (D)	$1,731.44	$744.74	$419.26
Source: West Virginia Secretary of State

==== Results ====
2026 West Virginia Senate election, 2nd district (Democratic primary)
Party	Candidate	Votes	%
Democratic	Chris Claypole	5,160	100.00%
Total votes		5,160	100.00%

=== General election ===
==== Results ====
2026 West Virginia Senate election, 2nd district
Party	Candidate	Votes	%	±%
Republican	Toby Heaney			
Democratic	Chris Claypole			
Total votes				

== District 3 (regular) ==
District 3 regular election
Nominee	Mike Azinger	Caci Petrehn
Party	Republican	Democratic
Incumbent Senator
Mike Azinger
Republican

District 3, highlighted in red

The third Senate district is based in the city of Parkersburg and contains the entirety of the counties of Pleasants, Ritchie, Wirt, and Wood. Other communities within the district include Blennerhassett, Vienna, and Williamstown.

The incumbent for this seat is Mike Azinger, a Republican, first elected in 2016. He was re-elected to this seat in 2018 and 2022, winning the general election with 57.4 and 65.7 percent of the vote respectively. He faced a strong primary challenge in 2022, winning his primary with just 51.5 percent of the vote. He is running for re-election. Republican nominee Donald Trump won this district with 73.2 percent of the vote in the 2024 presidential election.

=== Republican primary ===
==== Nominee ====
- Mike Azinger, incumbent senator

==== Eliminated in primary ====
- Bob Fehrenbacher, state delegate from the 11th district (2022–present)

==== Did not qualify ====
- William Wesley Cox

==== Endorsements ====
Mike Azinger

Statewide officials

- Patrick Morrisey, governor of West Virginia (2025–present)
Bob Fehrenbacher

U.S. senators

- Shelley Moore Capito, West Virginia (2015–present)

Organizations

- West Virginia Chamber of Commerce

==== Fundraising ====
Campaign finance reports as of January 7, 2026
Candidate	Raised	Spent	Cash on hand
Mike Azinger (R)	$31,528.16	$1,116.50	$30,411.66
Source: West Virginia Secretary of State

==== Results ====
2026 West Virginia Senate election, 3rd district (Republican primary)
Party	Candidate	Votes	%
Republican	Mike Azinger (incumbent)	5,840	61.13%
Republican	Bob Fehrenbacher	3,714	38.87%
Total votes		9,554	100.00%

=== Democratic primary ===
==== Nominee ====
- Caci Petrehn

==== Endorsements ====
Caci Petrehn

Labor unions

- Communications Workers of America District 2-13

==== Results ====
2026 West Virginia Senate election, 3rd district (Democratic primary)
Party	Candidate	Votes	%
Democratic	Caci Petrehn	4,248	100.00%
Total votes		4,248	100.00%

=== General election ===
==== Results ====
2026 West Virginia Senate election, 3rd district
Party	Candidate	Votes	%	±%
Republican	Mike Azinger (incumbent)			
Democratic	Caci Petrehn			
Total votes				

== District 3 (special) ==
District 3 special Republican primary election
- May 12, 2026

Election not currently contested by any other political party or independent politician.
Nominee	Trenton Barnhart	Jason S. Harshbarger
Party	Republican	Republican
Popular vote	5,477	3,547
Percentage	60.69%	39.31%
- County results Barnhart: 50–60% 60–70% 80–90% Harshbarger: 50–60%
Senator before election
Trenton Barnhart
Republican
Elected Senator
TBD

The incumbent for this seat is Trenton Barnhart, a Republican, first appointed in 2026, never being elected to this seat in his own right. He is running for re-election. No Democrats filed to run for the seat, likely making the Republican primary tantamount to election. Republican nominee Donald Trump won this district with 73.2 percent of the vote in the 2024 presidential election.

=== Republican primary ===
==== Nominee ====
- Trenton Barnhart, incumbent senator

==== Eliminated in primary ====
- Jason Harshbarger, former state delegate from the 7th district (2016–2019)

==== Endorsements ====
Trenton Barnhart

U.S. representatives

- David McIntosh, former IN-02 (1995–2001)

Statewide officials

- Patrick Morrisey, governor of West Virginia (2025–present)

Organizations

- School Freedom Fund
Jason Harshbarger

Organizations

- West Virginia Chamber of Commerce

==== Results ====
2026 West Virginia Senate election, 3rd district (special Republican primary)
Party	Candidate	Votes	%
Republican	Trenton Barnhart (incumbent)	5,477	60.69%
Republican	Jason S. Harshbarger	3,547	39.31%
Total votes		9,024	100.00%

== District 4 ==
District 4 election
Nominee	Eric Tarr	Zachary Abbott
Party	Republican	Democratic
Incumbent Senator
Eric Tarr
Republican

District 4, highlighted in red

The fourth Senate district contains the entirety of Mason County, along with portions of the counties of Cabell, Jackson, and Putnam. The largest municipality in the district is Teays Valley; other communities within the district include Culloden, Hurricane, Milton, Point Pleasant, Ravenswood, Ripley, and Winfield.

The incumbent for this seat is Eric Tarr, a Republican, first elected in 2018. He was elected to this seat in the 2018 general election with 51.8 percent of the vote and was re-elected in 2022 without opposition. He is running for re-election. Republican nominee Donald Trump won this district with 74.0 percent of the vote in the 2024 presidential election.

In October 2026, Eric Tarr's campaign brought emergency petitions against both Democratic nominee Zachary Abbott and Libertarian nominee Stephanie Butcher, claiming both did not meet the residency requirements to run in District 4. Abbott was deemed ineligible after Tarr brought evidence that he did not reside at the Scott Depot address he listed on his candidacy application. Butcher was deemed ineligble as she resided in Mason County, the same county that State Senator Amy Grady resides in; the West Virginia constitution prohibits multiple State Senators from the same county. Ultimately, all three candidates appeared on the ballot, but only votes for Tarr were accepted.

=== Republican primary ===
==== Nominee ====
- Eric Tarr, incumbent senator

==== Eliminated in primary ====
- Phillip D. Surface
- Travis Willard

==== Did not qualify ====
- Kenneth D. Matthews Jr.

==== Fundraising ====
Campaign finance reports as of January 7, 2026
Candidate	Raised	Spent	Cash on hand
Phillip D. Surface (R)	$51,352.81	$14,133.65	$54,250.29
Eric Tarr (R)	$22,942.28	$12,977.17	$64,361.22
Travis Willard (R)	$11,058.89	$10,398.06	$660.83
Source: West Virginia Secretary of State

==== Results ====
2026 West Virginia Senate election, 4th district (Republican primary)
Party	Candidate	Votes	%
Republican	Eric Tarr (incumbent)	3,449	38.81%
Republican	Phillip D. Surface	2,788	31.37%
Republican	Travis Willard	2,651	29.83%
Total votes		8,888	100.00%

=== Democratic primary ===
==== Nominee ====
- Zachary Abbott

==== Results ====
2026 West Virginia Senate election, 4th district (Democratic primary)
Party	Candidate	Votes	%
Democratic	Zachary Abbott	3,829	100.00%
Total votes		3,829	100.00%

=== Libertarian primary ===
==== Nominee ====
- Stephanie Butcher

=== General election ===
==== Results ====
2026 West Virginia Senate election, 4th district
Party	Candidate	Votes	%	±%
Republican	Eric Tarr (incumbent)			
Democratic	Zachary Abbott			
Total votes				

== District 5 ==
District 5 election
Nominee	DuRon Jackson	Chris Miller
Party	Democratic	Republican
Incumbent Senator
Mike Woelfel
Democratic

District 5, highlighted in red

The fifth Senate district is based in the city of Huntington and contains portions of the counties of Cabell and Wayne. Other communities within the district include Kenova and Barboursville.

The incumbent for this seat is minority leader Mike Woelfel, a Democrat, first elected in the 2014 general election with 49.8 percent of the vote. He was re-elected to this seat in 2018 and 2022, winning the general election with 59.7 and 54.0 percent of the vote respectively. He has declined to run for re-election. Republican nominee Donald Trump won this district with 61.3 percent of the vote in the 2024 presidential election.

=== Democratic primary ===
==== Nominee ====
- DuRon Jackson, former member of Huntington City Council

==== Eliminated in primary ====
- Josh Keck, educator
- Paul David Ross

==== Declined ====
- Mike Woelfel, incumbent senator

==== Results ====
2026 West Virginia Senate election, 5th district (Democratic primary)
Party	Candidate	Votes	%
Democratic	DuRon Jackson	2,726	44.47%
Democratic	Josh Keck	2,389	38.97%
Democratic	Paul David Ross	1,015	16.56%
Total votes		6,130	100.00%

=== Republican primary ===
==== Nominee ====
- Chris Miller, auto salesman, son of U.S. Representative Carol Miller, and candidate for governor in 2024

==== Endorsements ====
Chris Miller

Organizations

- West Virginia Chamber of Commerce

==== Results ====
2026 West Virginia Senate election, 5th district (Republican primary)
Party	Candidate	Votes	%
Republican	Chris Miller	3,992	100.00%
Total votes		3,992	100.00%

=== General election ===
==== Results ====
2026 West Virginia Senate election, 5th district
Party	Candidate	Votes	%	±%
Democratic	DuRon Jackson			
Republican	Chris Miller			
Total votes				

== District 6 ==
District 6 election
Nominee	Mark R. Maynard	Wyatt Lilly
Party	Republican	Democratic
Incumbent Senator
Mark R. Maynard
Republican

District 6, highlighted in red

The sixth Senate district is located along the state's southwestern border. Contained within the district are the entirety of the counties of McDowell, Mingo, and Mercer, along with portions of Wayne County. The largest municipality in the district is Bluefield; other communities within the district include Bluewell, Princeton, Welch, and Williamson.

The incumbent for this seat is Mark Maynard, a Republican, first elected in the 2014 general election with 50.8 percent of the vote. He was re-elected to this seat in 2018 and 2022, winning the general election with 61.5 and 73.4 percent of the vote respectively. He is running for re-election. Republican nominee Donald Trump won this district with 80.4 percent of the vote in the 2024 presidential election.

=== Republican primary ===
==== Nominee ====
- Mark Maynard, incumbent senator

==== Eliminated in primary ====
- Jeff Disibbio, Democratic nominee for this district in 2024
- Eric Porterfield, former state delegate from the 27th district (2018–2020) and candidate for this district in 2024
- Edwin Ray Vanover, Democratic nominee for the 26th house district in 2012

==== Did not qualify ====
- Robert "Rocky" Seay, Democratic nominee for this district in 2016

==== Endorsements ====
Jeff Disibbio

Organizations

- West Virginia Chamber of Commerce
Mark Maynard

U.S. representatives

- David McIntosh, former IN-02 (1995–2001)

Statewide officials

- Patrick Morrisey, governor of West Virginia (2025–present)

Organizations

- Americans for Prosperity
- School Freedom Fund

==== Fundraising ====
Campaign finance reports as of January 7, 2026
Candidate	Raised	Spent	Cash on hand
Jeff Disibbio (R)	$20,794.60	$1,000.00	$19,394.60
Mark Maynard (R)	$5,600.00	$5,899.59	$6,488.83
Edwin Ray Vanover (R)	$0.00	$0.00	$0.00
Source: West Virginia Secretary of State

==== Results ====
2026 West Virginia Senate election, 6th district (Republican primary)
Party	Candidate	Votes	%
Republican	Mark Maynard (incumbent)	2,878	49.72%
Republican	Jeff Disibbio	1,699	29.35%
Republican	Eric Porterfield	868	15.00%
Republican	Edwin Ray Vanover	343	5.93%
Total votes		5,788	100.00%

=== Democratic primary ===
==== Nominee ====
- Wyatt Lilly

==== Eliminated in primary ====
- Joshua Hamby

==== Endorsements ====
Wyatt Lilly

Labor unions

- Communications Workers of America District 2-13

==== Results ====
2026 West Virginia Senate election, 6th district (Democratic primary)
Party	Candidate	Votes	%
Democratic	Wyatt Lilly	1,786	54.32%
Democratic	Joshua Hamby	1,502	45.68%
Total votes		3,288	100.00%

=== General election ===
==== Results ====
2026 West Virginia Senate election, 6th district
Party	Candidate	Votes	%	±%
Republican	Mark Maynard (incumbent)			
Democratic	Wyatt Lilly			
Total votes				

== District 7 ==
District 7 election
Nominee	Zack Maynard	Cindy Brake
Party	Republican	Democratic
Incumbent Senator
Zack Maynard
Republican

District 7, highlighted in red

The seventh Senate district is located in Southern West Virginia. Contained within the district are the entirety of the counties of Boone, Lincoln, and Logan, along with portions of Kanawha County. The largest municipality in the district is Madison.

The incumbent for this seat is Zack Maynard, a Republican, first appointed in 2025 to fill a vacancy left by the resignation of Michael B. Stuart in October 2025, who was appointed General Counsel to the U.S. Department of Health and Human Services. Stuart was re-elected in 2022 with 58.2 percent of the vote, flipping a Democratic-held seat. Maynard is running for re-election. He is running for re-election. Republican nominee Donald Trump won this district with 77.3 percent of the vote in the 2024 presidential election.

=== Republican primary ===
==== Nominee ====
- Zack Maynard, incumbent senator

==== Endorsements ====
Zack Maynard

Organizations

- West Virginia Chamber of Commerce

==== Fundraising ====
Campaign finance reports as of January 7, 2026
Candidate	Raised	Spent	Cash on hand
Zack Maynard (R)	$33,792.46	$10.25	$33,700.00
Source: West Virginia Secretary of State

==== Results ====
2026 West Virginia Senate election, 7th district (Republican primary)
Party	Candidate	Votes	%
Republican	Zack Maynard (incumbent)	3,469	100.00%
Total votes		3,469	100.00%

=== Democratic primary ===
==== Nominee ====
- Cynthia Brake

==== Eliminated in primary ====
- Michael Karr

==== Results ====
2026 West Virginia Senate election, 7th district (Democratic primary)
Party	Candidate	Votes	%
Democratic	Cynthia Brake	2,382	57.11%
Democratic	Michael Karr	1,789	42.89%
Total votes		4,171	100.00%

=== Independent candidates ===
==== Filed ====
- Shawn M. Legg

=== General election ===
==== Results ====
2026 West Virginia Senate election, 7th district
Party	Candidate	Votes	%	±%
Republican	Zack Maynard (incumbent)			
Democratic	Cynthia Brake			
Independent	Shawn M. Legg			
Total votes				

== District 8 ==
District 8 election
Nominee	Lance V. Wheeler	Kim Hundley
Party	Republican	Democratic
Incumbent Senator
T. Kevan Bartlett
Republican

District 8, highlighted in red

The eighth Senate district is based in northern Charleston, the state's capital and largest city. Contained within the district are the entirety of the counties of Clay and Roane, along with portions of the counties of Jackson, Kanawha, and Putnam. Other communities within the district include Cross Lanes, Dunbar, Nitro, and Spencer.

The incumbent for this seat is T. Kevan Bartlett, a Republican, first appointed in 2025 to fill a vacancy left by the resignation of Mark Hunt to become state auditor. Hunt was first elected in 2022 with 56.8 percent of the vote, flipping a Democratic-held seat. Bartlett is running for re-election. Republican nominee Donald Trump won this district with 62.7 percent of the vote in the 2024 presidential election.

=== Republican primary ===
==== Nominee ====
- Lance Wheeler, candidate for this district in 2014

==== Eliminated in primary ====
- T. Kevan Bartlett, incumbent senator
- Steven Eshenaur, veteran and physician

==== Endorsements ====
T. Kevan Bartlett

Statewide officials

- Patrick Morrisey, governor of West Virginia (2025–present)
Steven Eshenaur

Labor unions

- Communications Workers of America District 2-13

Organizations

- West Virginia Chamber of Commerce
Lance Wheeler

Organizations

- Americans for Prosperity

==== Fundraising ====
Campaign finance reports as of January 7, 2026
Candidate	Raised	Spent	Cash on hand
T. Kevan Bartlett (R)	$20,030.00	$8,470.12	$11,559.88
Steven Eshenaur (R)	$74,560.00	$8,941.96	$46,013.72
Lance V. Wheeler (R)	$59,572.20	$4,142.39	$55,237.81
Source: West Virginia Secretary of State

==== Results ====
Precinct results Wheeler: 30–40%; 40–50%; 50–60%; 60–70%; 70–80%; 80–90%; 90–100%; Bartlett: 30–40%; 40–50%; 50–60%; 60–70%; 90–100%; Eshenaur: 30–40%; 40–50%; 50–60%; Tie: 30–40%; 40–50%; 50%

2026 West Virginia Senate election, 8th district (Republican primary)
Party	Candidate	Votes	%
Republican	Lance V. Wheeler	2,095	37.35%
Republican	T. Kevan Bartlett (incumbent)	1,908	34.02%
Republican	Steven Eshenaur	1,606	28.63%
Total votes		5,609	100.00%

=== Democratic primary ===
==== Nominee ====
- Kim Hundley

==== Withdrawn ====
- Mark Tabbert

==== Results ====
2026 West Virginia Senate election, 8th district (Democratic primary)
Party	Candidate	Votes	%
Democratic	Kim Hundley	5,435	100.00%
Total votes		5,435	100.00%

=== Mountain primary ===
==== Did not qualify ====
- Chase Linko-Looper, nominee for governor in 2024

=== General election ===
==== Polling ====
Poll source	Date(s) administered	Sample size	Margin of error	Lance Wheeler (R)	Kim Hundley (D)	Undecided
State Navigate	September 30 – October 1, 2026	1,002 (LV)	± 3.4%	46%	40%	14%

==== Results ====
2026 West Virginia Senate election, 8th district
Party	Candidate	Votes	%	±%
Republican	Lance V. Wheeler			
Democratic	Kim Hundley			
Total votes				

== District 9 ==
District 9 election
Nominee	Rollan Roberts	Christy Cardwell
Party	Republican	Democratic
Incumbent Senator
Rollan Roberts
Republican

District 9, highlighted in red

The ninth Senate district is based in the city of Beckley and contains the entirety of the counties of Raleigh and Wyoming, along with portions of Fayette County. Other communities within the district include Crab Orchard and Oak Hill.

The incumbent for this seat is Rollan Roberts, a Republican, first elected in 2018. He was re-elected in 2022 with 78.1 percent of the vote. He faced a strong primary opponent in 2022, winning re-nomination with 51.7 percent of the vote. Roberts is running for re-election. Republican nominee Donald Trump won this district with 77.0 percent of the vote in the 2024 presidential election.

=== Republican primary ===
==== Nominee ====
- Rollan Roberts, incumbent senator

==== Eliminated in primary ====
- Michael Antolini, businessman and physician
- Adam Vance, state delegate from the 35th district (2022–present)

==== Endorsements ====
Michael Antolini

U.S. senators

- Shelley Moore Capito, West Virginia (2015–present)

Organizations

- West Virginia Chamber of Commerce
Rollan Roberts

U.S. representatives

- David McIntosh, former IN-02 (1995–2001)

State legislators

- Randy Smith, president of the West Virginia Senate (2025–present) from the 14th district (2017–present)

Organizations

- Americans for Prosperity
- School Freedom Fund
Adam Vance

Labor unions

- Communications Workers of America District 2-13

==== Fundraising ====
Campaign finance reports as of January 7, 2026
Candidate	Raised	Spent	Cash on hand
Michael Antolini (R)	$39,477.82	$5,653.94	$62,263.06
Rollan Roberts (R)	$71,082.60	$3,933.56	$68,149.04
Source: West Virginia Secretary of State

==== Polling ====
Poll source	Date(s) administered	Sample size	Margin of error	Michael Antolini	Rollan Roberts	Adam Vance	Undecided
State Navigate	May 3–6, 2026	424 (LV)	± 5.5%	28%	28%	14%	19%
State Navigate	May 3–6, 2026	424 (LV)	± 5.5%	29%	35%	17%	29%

==== Results ====
2026 West Virginia Senate election, 9th district (Republican primary)
Party	Candidate	Votes	%
Republican	Rollan Roberts (incumbent)	3,114	44.65%
Republican	Michael Antolini	2,343	33.59%
Republican	Adam Vance	1,518	21.76%
Total votes		6,975	100.00%

=== Democratic primary ===
==== Nominee ====
- Christy Cardwell

==== Endorsements ====
Christy Cardwell

Labor unions

- Communications Workers of America District 2-13

==== Results ====
2026 West Virginia Senate election, 9th district (Democratic primary)
Party	Candidate	Votes	%
Democratic	Christy Cardwell	3,589	100.00%
Total votes		3,589	100.00%

=== General election ===
==== Results ====
2026 West Virginia Senate election, 9th district
Party	Candidate	Votes	%	±%
Republican	Rollan Roberts (incumbent)			
Democratic	Christy Cardwell			
Total votes				

== District 10 ==
District 10 election
Nominee	Vince Deeds	Kent Gilkerson
Party	Republican	Democratic
Incumbent Senator
Vince Deeds
Republican

District 10, highlighted in red

The tenth Senate district is located in Southern West Virginia. Contained within the district are the entirety of the counties of Greenbrier, Monroe, Nicholas, and Summers, along with portions of Fayette County. The largest municipality in the district is Lewisburg; other communities within the district include Craigsville, Fayetteville, Summersville, and White Sulphur Springs.

The incumbent for this seat is Vince Deeds, a Republican, first elected in 2022 with 58.7 percent of the vote, flipping a Democratic-held seat. Deeds is running for re-election. Republican nominee Donald Trump won this district with 74.1 percent of the vote in the 2024 presidential election.

=== Republican primary ===
==== Nominee ====
- Vince Deeds, incumbent senator

==== Eliminated in primary ====
- Jonathan Comer, pastor

==== Disqualified ====
- Robert Shirley Love

==== Endorsements ====
Jonathan Comer

Statewide officials

- Patrick Morrisey, governor of West Virginia (2025–present)
Vince Deeds

Organizations

- West Virginia Chamber of Commerce

==== Fundraising ====
Campaign finance reports as of January 7, 2026
Candidate	Raised	Spent	Cash on hand
Vince Deeds (R)	$30,715.00	$11,944.94	$18,770.06
Robert Shirley Love (R)	$0.00	$0.00	$0.00
Source: West Virginia Secretary of State

==== Results ====
2026 West Virginia Senate election, 10th district (Republican primary)
Party	Candidate	Votes	%
Republican	Vince Deeds (incumbent)	5,832	66.54%
Republican	Jonathan Comer	2,932	33.46%
Total votes		8,764	100.00%

=== Democratic primary ===
==== Nominee ====
- Kent Gilkerson, farmer

==== Endorsements ====
Kent Gilkerson

Labor unions

- Communications Workers of America District 2-13

==== Results ====
2026 West Virginia Senate election, 10th district (Democratic primary)
Party	Candidate	Votes	%
Democratic	Kent Gilkerson	4,558	100.00%
Total votes		4,558	100.00%

=== General election ===
==== Results ====
2026 West Virginia Senate election, 10th district
Party	Candidate	Votes	%	±%
Republican	Vince Deeds (incumbent)			
Democratic	Kent Gilkerson			
Total votes				

== District 11 ==
District 11 election
Nominee	Bill Hamilton	Kevin Leon Carpenter
Party	Republican	Democratic
Incumbent Senator
Bill Hamilton
Republican

District 11, highlighted in red

The eleventh Senate district is located on the eastern border of the state. Contained within the district are the entirety of the counties of Barbour, Braxton, Pendleton, Pocahontas, Randolph, Upshur, and Webster. The largest municipality in the district is Elkins; other communities within the district include Buckhannon and Philippi.

The incumbent for this seat is Bill Hamilton, a Republican, first elected in 2018. He was re-elected in 2022 unopposed. Hamilton is running for re-election. Republican nominee Donald Trump won this district with 76.1 percent of the vote in the 2024 presidential election.

=== Republican primary ===
==== Nominee ====
- Bill Hamilton, incumbent senator

==== Eliminated in primary ====
- Robert L. Karnes, former senator from this district (2014–2018, 2020–2024)
- Jack Reger, former Buckhannon city councilor

==== Endorsements ====
Bill Hamilton

Labor unions

- Communications Workers of America District 2-13

Organizations

- West Virginia Chamber of Commerce

==== Fundraising ====
Campaign finance reports as of January 7, 2026
Candidate	Raised	Spent	Cash on hand
Bill Hamilton (R)	$107,304.54	$9,861.92	$97,442.62
Robert L. Karnes (R)	$3,800.00	$11.08	$3,788.92
Jack Reger (R)	$800.00	$12.89	$787.11
Source: West Virginia Secretary of State

==== Results ====
2026 West Virginia Senate election, 11th district (Republican primary)
Party	Candidate	Votes	%
Republican	Bill Hamilton (incumbent)	3,509	43.89%
Republican	Jack Reger	2,317	28.98%
Republican	Robert L. Karnes	2,169	27.13%
Total votes		7,995	100.00%

=== Democratic primary ===
==== Nominee ====
- Kevin Leon Carpenter

==== Results ====
2026 West Virginia Senate election, 11th district (Democratic primary)
Party	Candidate	Votes	%
Democratic	Kevin Leon Carpenter	4,620	100.00%
Total votes		4,620	100.00%

=== General election ===
==== Results ====
2026 West Virginia Senate election, 11th district
Party	Candidate	Votes	%	±%
Republican	Bill Hamilton (incumbent)			
Democratic	Kevin Leon Carpenter			
Total votes				

== District 12 ==
District 12 election
Nominee	Ben Queen	Lynette Murray
Party	Republican	Democratic
Incumbent Senator
Ben Queen
Republican

District 12, highlighted in red

The twelfth Senate district is located in the center of the state. Contained within the district are the entirety of the counties of Calhoun, Gilmer, Harrison, and Lewis, along with portions of Tyler County. The largest municipality in the district is Clarksburg; other communities within the district include Bridgeport and Shinnston.

The incumbent for this seat is Ben Queen, a Republican, first elected in 2022 with 68.7 percent of the vote, flipping a Democratic-held seat. Queen is running for re-election. Republican nominee Donald Trump won this district with 72.6 percent of the vote in the 2024 presidential election.

=== Republican primary ===
==== Nominee ====
- Ben Queen, incumbent senator

==== Eliminated in primary ====
- Joseph Earley, candidate for West Virginia's 2nd congressional district in 2024

==== Endorsements ====
Ben Queen

Organizations

- West Virginia Chamber of Commerce

==== Fundraising ====
Campaign finance reports as of January 7, 2026
Candidate	Raised	Spent	Cash on hand
Ben Queen (R)	$24,050.00	$10,462.29	$13,587.71
Source: West Virginia Secretary of State

==== Results ====
2026 West Virginia Senate election, 12th district (Republican primary)
Party	Candidate	Votes	%
Republican	Ben Queen (incumbent)	3,729	54.53%
Republican	Joseph Earley	3,109	45.47%
Total votes		6,838	100.00%

=== Democratic primary ===
==== Nominee ====
- Lynette Murray

==== Endorsements ====
Lynette Murray

Labor unions

- Communications Workers of America District 2-13

==== Results ====
2026 West Virginia Senate election, 12th district (Democratic primary)
Party	Candidate	Votes	%
Democratic	Lynette Murray	4,888	100.00%
Total votes		4,888	100.00%

=== General election ===
==== Results ====
2026 West Virginia Senate election, 12th district
Party	Candidate	Votes	%	±%
Republican	Ben Queen (incumbent)			
Democratic	Lynette Murray			
Total votes				

== District 13 ==
District 13 election
Nominee	Mike Oliverio	John Williams
Party	Republican	Democratic
Incumbent Senator
Mike Oliverio
Republican

District 13, highlighted in red

The thirteenth Senate district is based in the city of Morgantown and contains portions of the counties of Marion and Monongalia. Other communities within the district include Brookhaven, Fairmont, Pleasant Valley, and Westover.

The incumbent for this seat is Mike Oliverio, a Republican, first elected in 1994 as a Democrat. After twelve years out of office, he was re-elected in 2022 as a Republican with 50.3 percent of the vote, flipping a Democratic-held seat. Oliverio is running for re-election. Republican nominee Donald Trump won this district with 51.5 percent of the vote in the 2024 presidential election.

=== Republican primary ===
==== Nominee ====
- Mike Oliverio, incumbent senator

==== Endorsements ====
Mike Oliverio

Organizations

- West Virginia Chamber of Commerce

==== Fundraising ====
Campaign finance reports as of January 7, 2026
Candidate	Raised	Spent	Cash on hand
Mike Oliverio (R)	$149,991.36	$20,252.48	$102,549.39
Source: West Virginia Secretary of State

==== Results ====
2026 West Virginia Senate election, 13th district (Republican primary)
Party	Candidate	Votes	%
Republican	Mike Oliverio (incumbent)	3,464	100.00%
Total votes		3,464	100.00%

==== Nominee ====
- John Williams, member of the West Virginia House of Delegates from the 80th district (2016–present)

==== Endorsements ====
John Williams

Labor unions

- Communications Workers of America District 2-13

==== Fundraising ====
Campaign finance reports as of January 7, 2026
Candidate	Raised	Spent	Cash on hand
John Williams (D)	$12,868.00	$3,422.68	$9,445.32
Source: West Virginia Secretary of State

==== Results ====
2026 West Virginia Senate election, 13th district (Democratic primary)
Party	Candidate	Votes	%
Democratic	John Williams	7,410	100.00%
Total votes		7,410	100.00%

=== General election ===
==== Results ====
2026 West Virginia Senate election, 13th district
Party	Candidate	Votes	%	±%
Republican	Mike Oliverio (incumbent)			
Democratic	John Williams			
Total votes				

== District 14 ==
District 14 election
Nominee	Jay Taylor	Jason Armentrout
Party	Republican	Democratic
Incumbent Senator
Jay Taylor
Republican

District 14, highlighted in red

The fourteenth Senate district is located at the base of the state's eastern panhandle. Contained within the district are the entirety of the counties of Grant, Hardy, Mineral, Preston, and Tucker, along with portions of Taylor County. The largest municipality in the district is Keyser; other communities within the district include Grafton, Kingwood, Moorefield, and Petersburg.

The incumbent for this seat is President pro tempore Jay Taylor, a Republican, first elected in 2022 with 76.2 percent of the vote. Taylor is running for re-election. Republican nominee Donald Trump won this district with 78.9 percent of the vote in the 2024 presidential election.

=== Republican primary ===
==== Nominee ====
- Jay Taylor, incumbent senator

==== Eliminated in primary ====
- Marc Harman, former state delegate from Grant County (1981–1989)
- Mike Manypenny, former Democratic state delegate from the 49th district (2009–2015) and Democratic nominee for West Virginia's 2nd congressional district (Note: This district was numbered as the 1st district prior to the 2020 redistricting cycle.) in 2016

==== Endorsements ====
Marc Harman

U.S. senators

- Shelley Moore Capito, West Virginia (2015–present)

Organizations

- West Virginia Chamber of Commerce
Mike Manypenny

Labor unions

- Communications Workers of America District 2-13

==== Fundraising ====
Campaign finance reports as of January 7, 2026
Candidate	Raised	Spent	Cash on hand
Marc Lee Harman (R)	$26,150.00	$2,684.23	$23,465.77
Jay Taylor (R)	$32,735.00	$8,988.55	$23,746.45
Source: West Virginia Secretary of State

==== Polling ====
Poll source	Date(s) administered	Sample size	Margin of error	Marc Lee Harman	Mike Manypenny	Jay Taylor	Undecided
State Navigate	March 21–22, 2026	223 (LV)	± 7.4%	18%	8%	15%	59%

==== Results ====
2026 West Virginia Senate election, 14th district (Republican primary)
Party	Candidate	Votes	%
Republican	Jay Taylor (incumbent)	4,207	47.03%
Republican	Marc Lee Harman	3,843	42.96%
Republican	Mike Manypenny	895	10.01%
Total votes		8,945	100.00%

=== Democratic primary ===
==== Nominee ====
- Jason Armentrout, independent candidate for the 15th district in 2018

==== Fundraising ====
Campaign finance reports as of January 7, 2026
Candidate	Raised	Spent	Cash on hand
Jason Armentrout (D)	$0.00	$0.00	$0.00
Source: West Virginia Secretary of State

==== Results ====
2026 West Virginia Senate election, 14th district (Democratic primary)
Party	Candidate	Votes	%
Democratic	Jason Armentrout	3,406	100.00%
Total votes		3,406	100.00%

=== General election ===
==== Results ====
2026 West Virginia Senate election, 14th district
Party	Candidate	Votes	%	±%
Republican	Jay Taylor (incumbent)			
Democratic	Jason Armentrout			
Total votes				

== District 15 ==
District 15 election
Nominee	Darren Thorne	Elizabeth Ferris
Party	Republican	Democratic
Incumbent Senator
Darren Thorne
Republican

District 15, highlighted in red

The fifteenth Senate district is located within the state's eastern panhandle. Contained within the district are the entirety of the counties of Hampshire and Morgan, along with portions of Berkeley County. The district contains the eastern half of Martinsburg, the largest community entirely residing within the district is Romney.

The incumbent for this seat is Darren Thorne, a Republican, first appointed to fill a vacancy left by the resignation of Charles S. Trump, who was elected to the state Court of Appeals. Trump was re-elected to the Senate in 2022 with 80.4 percent of the vote. Thorne is running for re-election. Republican nominee Donald Trump won this district with 72.1 percent of the vote in the 2024 presidential election.

=== Republican primary ===
==== Nominee ====
- Darren Thorne, incumbent senator

==== Eliminated in primary ====
- Ken Reed, former member of the West Virginia House of Delegates from the 59th district (2020–2022) and candidate for West Virginia's 2nd congressional district in 2014
- Robert Wolford

==== Endorsements ====
Ken Reed

Organizations

- West Virginia Chamber of Commerce
Darren Thorne

U.S. representatives

- David McIntosh, former IN-02 (1995–2001)

Organizations

- Americans for Prosperity
- School Freedom Fund

==== Fundraising ====
Campaign finance reports as of January 7, 2026
Candidate	Raised	Spent	Cash on hand
Ken Reed (R)	$3,400.00	$289.41	$3,110.59
Darren Thorne (R)	$34,341.03	$17,552.68	$16,196.39
Source: West Virginia Secretary of State

==== Results ====
2026 West Virginia Senate election, 15th district (Republican primary)
Party	Candidate	Votes	%
Republican	Darren Thorne (incumbent)	4,209	55.31%
Republican	Ken Reed	2,703	35.52%
Republican	Robert Wolford	698	9.17%
Total votes		7,610	100.00%

=== Democratic primary ===
==== Nominee ====
- Elizabeth Ferris, educator

==== Results ====
2026 West Virginia Senate election, 15th district (Democratic primary)
Party	Candidate	Votes	%
Democratic	Elizabeth Ferris	3,322	100.00%
Total votes		3,322	100.00%

=== General election ===
==== Results ====
2026 West Virginia Senate election, 15th district
Party	Candidate	Votes	%	±%
Republican	Darren Thorne (incumbent)			
Democratic	Elizabeth Ferris			
Total votes				

== District 16 ==
District 16 election
Nominee	Jason Barrett	Travis Bost
Party	Republican	Libertarian
Senator before election
Jason Barrett
Republican
Elected Senator
TBD

District 16, highlighted in red

The sixteenth Senate district is located on the far edge of the state's eastern panhandle. Contained within the district are the entirety of Jefferson County, along with portions of Berkeley County. The district contains the western half of Martinsburg; other communities within the district include Charles Town, Inwood, Charles Town, and Shannondale.

The incumbent for this seat is Jason Barrett, a Republican, first elected in 2022 with 60.5 percent of the vote, flipping a Democratic-held seat. Barrett is running for re-election. No Democrats filed to run for the seat, likely making the Republican primary tantamount to election. Republican nominee Donald Trump won this district with 60.8 percent of the vote in the 2024 presidential election.

=== Republican primary ===
==== Nominee ====
- Jason Barrett, incumbent senator

==== Eliminated in primary ====
- Chantele Mack

==== Endorsements ====
Jason Barrett

Organizations

- West Virginia Chamber of Commerce

==== Fundraising ====
Campaign finance reports as of January 7, 2026
Candidate	Raised	Spent	Cash on hand
Jason Barrett (R)	$125,445.23	$2,523.08	$120,396.80
Source: West Virginia Secretary of State

==== Results ====
2026 West Virginia Senate election, 16th district (Republican primary)
Party	Candidate	Votes	%
Republican	Jason Barrett (incumbent)	3,509	63.16%
Republican	Chantele Mack	2,047	36.84%
Total votes		5,556	100.00%

=== General election ===
==== Results ====
2026 West Virginia Senate election, 16th district
Party	Candidate	Votes	%	±%
Republican	Jason Barrett			
Total votes				

== District 17 (regular) ==
District 17 regular election
Nominee	Tom Takubo	Wes Holden
Party	Republican	Democratic
Incumbent Senator
Tom Takubo
Republican

District 17, highlighted in red

The seventeenth Senate district is based in southern Charleston, the state's capital and largest city, entirely within Kanawha County. Other communities within the district include Pinch, Sissonville, South Charleston, and St. Albans.

The incumbent for this seat is Tom Takubo, a Republican, first elected in 2014. He was re-elected in 2022 with 58.5 percent of the vote. Takubo is running for re-election. Republican nominee Donald Trump won this district with 59.5 percent of the vote in the 2024 presidential election.

=== Republican primary ===
==== Nominee ====
- Tom Takubo, incumbent senator

==== Eliminated in primary ====
- Chris Pritt, former state delegate from the 36th district (2020–2024) and candidate for this district in 2024

==== Disqualified ====
- Doug Skaff, former Democratic minority leader of the West Virginia House of Delegates (2020–2023) from the 57th district (2008–2014, 2018–2023) (deceased)

==== Endorsements ====
Chris Pritt

Statewide officials

- Patrick Morrisey, governor of West Virginia (2025–present)

State legislators

- Randy Smith, president of the West Virginia Senate (2025–present) from the 14th district (2017–present)
Tom Takubo

U.S. senators

- Shelley Moore Capito, West Virginia (2015–present)

Organizations

- West Virginia Chamber of Commerce

==== Fundraising ====
Campaign finance reports as of January 7, 2026
Candidate	Raised	Spent	Cash on hand
Chris Pritt (R)	$16,851.00	$149.84	$16,701.16
Tom Takubo (R)	$85,075.64	$4,057.24	$81,018.40
Source: West Virginia Secretary of State

==== Polling ====
Poll source	Date(s) administered	Sample size	Margin of error	Chris Pritt	Tom Takubo	Undecided
State Navigate	May 3–6, 2026	360 (LV)	± 5.5%	36%	40%	24%
State Navigate	May 3–6, 2026	360 (LV)	± 5.5%	41%	42%	17%
State Navigate	April 10–12, 2026	324 (LV)	± 5.4%	39%	40%	21%

==== Results ====
Precinct results Takubo: 50–60%; 60–70%; 70–80%; 80–90%; 90–100%; Pritt: 50–60%; 60–70%; 70–80%; 90–100%; Tie No votes

2026 West Virginia Senate election, 17th district (Republican primary)
Party	Candidate	Votes	%
Republican	Tom Takubo (incumbent)	3,863	56.09%
Republican	Chris Pritt	3,024	43.91%
Total votes		6,887	100.00%

=== Democratic primary ===
==== Nominee ====
- Wes Holden, legislative staffer and independent candidate for West Virginia's 1st congressional district in 2024

==== Endorsements ====
Wes Holden

Labor unions

- Communications Workers of America District 2-13

==== Fundraising ====
Campaign finance reports as of January 7, 2026
Candidate	Raised	Spent	Cash on hand
Wes Holden (D)	$3,210.00	$3,210.00	$0.00
Source: West Virginia Secretary of State

==== Results ====
2026 West Virginia Senate election, 17th district (Democratic primary)
Party	Candidate	Votes	%
Democratic	Wes Holden	5,360	100.00%
Total votes		5,360	100.00%

=== General election ===
==== Results ====
2026 West Virginia Senate election, 17th district
Party	Candidate	Votes	%	±%
Republican	Tom Takubo (incumbent)			
Democratic	Wes Holden			
Total votes				

== District 17 (special) ==
District 17 special election
Nominee	Anne Charnock	Richie Robb
Party	Republican	Democratic
Incumbent Senator
Anne Charnock
Republican

=== Republican primary ===
==== Nominee ====
- Anne Charnock, incumbent senator

==== Eliminated in primary ====
- Michael Jarrouj, restaurateur

==== Endorsements ====
Anne Charnock

U.S. representatives

- David McIntosh, former IN-02 (1995–2001)

Statewide officials

- Patrick Morrisey, governor of West Virginia (2025–present)

Organizations

- Americans for Prosperity
- School Freedom Fund
Michael Jarrouj

Organizations

- West Virginia Chamber of Commerce

==== Fundraising ====
Campaign finance reports as of January 7, 2026
Candidate	Raised	Spent	Cash on hand
Anne Charnock (R)	$38,594.80	$718.28	$37,287.85
Michael Jarrouj (R)	$0.00	$0.00	$0.00
Source: West Virginia Secretary of State

==== Polling ====
Poll source	Date(s) administered	Sample size	Margin of error	Anne Charnock	Michael Jarrouj	Undecided
State Navigate	May 3–6, 2026	360 (LV)	± 5.5%	54%	28%	18%
State Navigate	May 3–6, 2026	360 (LV)	± 5.5%	54%	28%	18%
State Navigate	April 10–12, 2026	324 (LV)	± 5.4%	42%	26%	33%

==== Results ====
2026 West Virginia Senate election, 17th district (special Republican primary)
Party	Candidate	Votes	%
Republican	Anne Charnock (incumbent)	3,787	56.74%
Republican	Michael Jarrouj	2,887	43.26%
Total votes		6,674	100.00%

=== Democratic primary ===
==== Nominee ====
- Richie Robb, former mayor of South Charleston, candidate for attorney general in 2024, U.S. Senate in 2020, and Republican candidate for the Supreme Court of Appeals in 1996

==== Eliminated in primary ====
- Ted Boettner, economist

==== Endorsements ====
Ted Boettner

Labor unions

- Communications Workers of America District 2-13

==== Results ====
Precinct results Robb: 50–60%; 60–70%; 70–80%; 80–90%; 90–100%; Boettner: 50–60%; 60–70%; 70–80%; 90–100%; Tie No votes

2026 West Virginia Senate election, 17th district (special Democratic primary)
Party	Candidate	Votes	%
Democratic	Richie Robb	3,839	50.35%
Democratic	Ted Boettner	3,785	49.65%
Total votes		7,624	100.00%

=== General election ===
==== Results ====
2026 West Virginia Senate Special election, 17th district
Party	Candidate	Votes	%	±%
Republican	Anne Charnock (incumbent)	12,964	47%	−17
Democratic	Richie Robb	14,732	53%	+17
Total votes				

== External websites ==
Official campaign websites for 1st district candidates

- Laura Wakim Chapman (R)
- Shawn Fluharty (D)

Official campaign websites for 2nd district candidates

- Christopher Claypole (D)
- Toby Heaney (R)

Official campaign websites for 3rd district candidates

- Caci Petrehn (D)

Official campaign websites for 4th district candidates

- Eric Tarr (R)

Official campaign websites for 5th district candidates

- DuRon Jackson (D)
- Chris Miller (R)

Official campaign websites for 6th district candidates

- Wyatt Lilly (D)
- Mark R. Maynard (R)

Official campaign websites for 7th district candidates

- Zack Maynard (R)

Official campaign websites for 8th district candidates

- Kim Hundley (D)
- Lance Wheeler (R)

Official campaign websites for 9th district candidates

- Christy Cardwell (D)
- Rollan Roberts (R)

Official campaign websites for 10th district candidates

- Vince Deeds (R)
- Kent Gilkerson (D)

Official campaign websites for 11th district candidates

- Kevin Carpenter (D)
- Bill Hamilton (R)

Official campaign websites for 13th district candidates

- Mike Oliverio (R)
- Taylor Richmond (L)
- John Williams (D)

Official campaign websites for 14th district candidates

- Jason Armentrout (D)

Official campaign websites for 15th district candidates

- Elizabeth Ferris (D)
- Ken Reed (I)
- Darren Thorne (R)

Official campaign websites for 16th district candidates

- Jason Barrett (R)
- Travis Bost (L)

Official campaign websites for 17th district candidates

- Wes Holden (D)
- Tom Takubo (R)
