= List of West Virginia Senate districts =

West Virginia's Senate districts since 2021

Current composition of the West Virginia Senate as of May 2024 2 Democrats 2 Republicans 1 Democrat and 1 Republican

The U.S. state of West Virginia currently has seventeen state senate districts, each represented by two members of the West Virginia Senate.

== Current districts and senators ==
Each district sends two senators to Charleston. Black lines on the map indicate state and district boundaries, and gray lines indicate county boundaries.

District	Party	Member up 2026 (Home county)	Party	Member up 2024 (Home county)	District map	Counties represented	2022 result
1st	Republican	Laura Chapman (Ohio)	Republican	Ryan Weld (Brooke)		Brooke; Hancock; Marshall; Ohio	R+21.0
2nd	Republican	Charles H. Clements (Wetzel)	Republican	Chris Rose (Monongalia)		Doddridge; Marion; Marshall; Monongalia; Wetzel; Tyler	R+25.0
3rd	Republican	Mike Azinger (Wood)	Republican	Donna Boley (Pleasants)		Pleasants; Ritchie; Wirt; Wood	R+31.4
4th	Republican	Eric Tarr (Putnam)	Republican	Amy Grady (Mason)		Cabell; Jackson; Mason; Putnam	R+100.0
5th	Democratic	Mike Woelfel (Cabell)	Democratic	Scott Fuller (Wayne)		Cabell; Wayne	D+8.0
6th	Republican	Mark R. Maynard (Wayne)	Republican	Craig A. Hart (Mingo)		McDowell; Mercer; Mingo; Wayne	R+46.8
7th	Republican	Michael B. Stuart (Kanawha)	Republican	Rupie Phillips (Logan)		Boone; Kanawha; Lincoln; Logan	R+16.4
8th	Republican	Kevan Bartlett (Kanawha)	Republican	Glenn Jeffries (Putnam)		Clay; Jackson; Kanawha; Putnam; Roane	R+13.6
9th	Republican	Rollan Roberts (Raleigh)	Republican	Brian Helton (Fayette)		Fayette; Raleigh; Wyoming	R+56.2
10th	Republican	Vince Deeds (Greenbrier)	Republican	Jack Woodrum (Summers)		Fayette; Greenbrier; Monroe; Nicholas; Summers	R+20.8
11th	Republican	Bill Hamilton (Upshur)	Republican	Robert L. Karnes (Randolph)		Barbour; Braxton; Pendleton; Pocahontas; Randolph; Upshur; Webster	R+100.0
12th	Republican	Ben Queen (Harrison)	Republican	Patrick S. Martin (Lewis)		Calhoun; Gilmer; Harrison; Lewis; Taylor	R+37.4
13th	Republican	Mike Oliverio (Monongalia)	Democratic	Joey Garcia (Marion)		Marion; Monongalia	R+0.6
14th	Republican	Jay Taylor (Taylor)	Republican	Randy Smith (Preston)		Grant; Hardy; Mineral; Preston; Taylor; Tucker	R+52.4
15th	Republican	Darren Thorne (Morgan)	Republican	Tom Willis (Berkeley)		Berkeley; Hampshire; Morgan	R+60.8
16th	Republican	Jason Barrett (Berkeley)	Republican	Patricia Rucker (Jefferson)		Berkeley; Jefferson	R+21.0
17th	Republican	Tom Takubo (Kanawha)	Republican	Anne Charnock (Kanawha)		Kanawha	R+17.0

== Historical and present district boundaries ==
Below is a table of West Virginia's state senate district boundary maps, presented chronologically. All redistricting events that took place in West Virginia in 1863 and between 1901 and the current boundaries as of August 2024 are shown.

Legend
- District 1
- District 2
- District 3
- District 4
- District 5
- District 6
- District 7
- District 8
- District 9
- District 10
- District 11
- District 12
  (from 1872)
- District 13
  (from 1891)
- District 14
  (from 1901)
- District 15
  (from 1901)
- District 16
  (from 1937)
- District 17
  (from 1964)

Year adopted	Statewide map	Notes	Ref
1861		District boundaries as they were defined during the first West Virginia Constitutional Convention in 1861. Districts 10 and 11 were planned in the case of other counties joining the state. Only Frederick County in District 11 did not end up joining the state.	
1872		District boundaries as they were defined during the second West Virginia Constitutional Convention in 1872. District 12 was added.	
1891		District 13 was added. When Mingo County split off from Logan County in 1895, it remained in District 7.	
1901		District boundaries as defined by House bill No. 235. Districts 14 and 15 were added.	
1937		A new District 16 and 2 seats are added in the eastern panhandle of the state.	
1951			
1964		A new District 17 and 2 seats are added within District 8 in Kanawha County. District boundaries otherwise remain unchanged.	
1982		Individual counties are split between multiple districts for the first time.	
1992			
2001			
2011		District 8 and 17 are separated.	
2021		Current boundaries as of May 2024.	

== See also ==
- West Virginia Senate
