= Corey Palumbo =

American attorney and politician (born 1972)

Minority Whip of the West Virginia Senate
- In office December 15, 2016 – December 6, 2020
- Preceded by: John Unger
- Succeeded by: Mike Woelfel

Member of the West Virginia Senate
- In office December 1, 2008 – December 1, 2020
- Preceded by: Vic Sprouse
- Succeeded by: Eric Nelson
- Constituency: 17th district (2012–2020); 8th district (2008–2012)

Member of the West Virginia House of Delegates from the 30th district
- In office December 1, 2002 – December 1, 2008
- Preceded by: Ray Keener; Rebecca Mathews; Joe Smith
- Succeeded by: Mark Hunt; Doug Skaff

Personal details
- Born: Corey Lee Palumbo; August 16, 1972 (age 53) Charleston, West Virginia, U.S.
- Party: Democratic
- Spouse: Cristin Meredith
- Children: Riley Meredith, Mario James, and Michael Corey
- Parent(s): Mario Palumbo; Louise Corey Palumbo
- Education: West Virginia University (BA); University of North Carolina at Chapel Hill (JD)
- Website: Official website

Corey Lee Palumbo (born August 16, 1972) is an American attorney and politician who represented the 17th district of the West Virginia Senate from January 14, 2009 until December 1, 2020. He previously served as a member of the West Virginia House of Delegates from 2003 to 2009. Palumbo did not run for reelection in the November 3, 2020 general election and was succeeded by West Virginia State Delegate Eric Nelson. Nelson was officially sworn in on December 1, 2020, before Palumbo's term was due to end.

He is the son of Mario Palumbo, the 32nd Attorney General of West Virginia as well as a former five-term state senator. Palumbo graduated from West Virginia University in 1994, and graduated from University of North Carolina's law school in 1998. He was hired as an attorney for Bowles, Rice, McDavid, Graff and Love that same year.

West Virginia Senate
Preceded by Vic Sprouse	Member of the West Virginia Senate from the 8th district 2009–2013	Succeeded by Chris Walters
Preceded by Dan Foster	Member of the West Virginia Senate from the 17th district 2013–2020	Succeeded by Eric Nelson
