= Martha Wehrle =

American politician (1925–2007)

Martha Gaines Wehrle

Member of the West Virginia Senate from the 17th district
- In office 1989–1994

Member of the West Virginia House of Representatives from the West Virginia's 17th House district 17th district
- In office 1974–1984

Personal details
- Born: November 30, 1925 Charleston, West Virginia, US
- Died: October 31, 2007 (aged 81) Charleston, West Virginia, US
- Party: Democratic
- Education: Vassar College; Harvard Graduate School of Education

Martha Gaines Wehrle (November 30, 1925 – October 31, 2007) was an American politician who served on the West Virginia House of Delegates from 1974 to 1984 and the West Virginia Senate from 1989 to 1994.
