= 2014 West Virginia Senate election =

2014 West Virginia Senate elections
- November 4, 2014

17 of 34 seats in the West Virginia Senate 18 seats needed for a majority
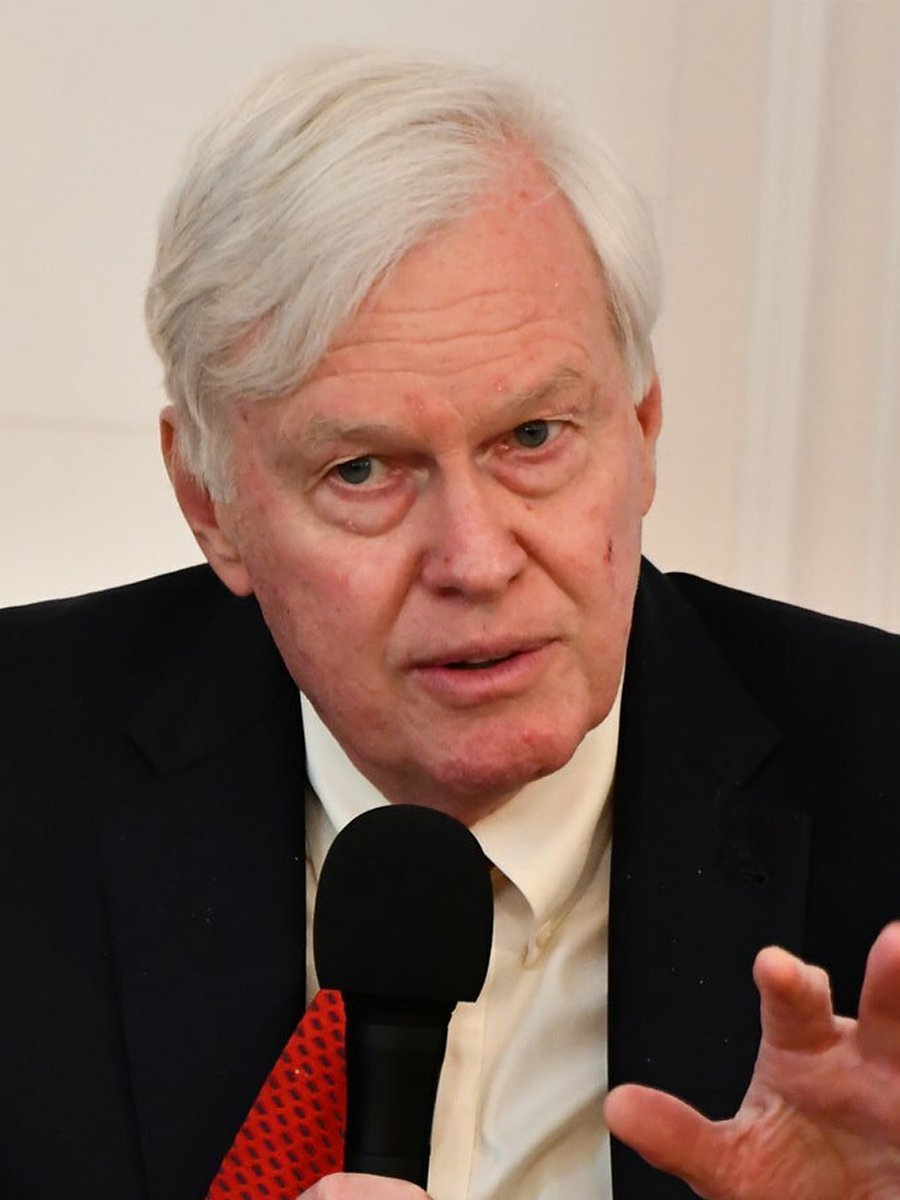

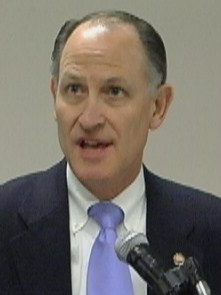
	Majority party	Minority party
Leader	Mike Hall	Jeff Kessler
Party	Republican	Democratic
Leader since	2010	2010
Leader's seat	SD 4	SD 2
Seats before	9	25
Seats after	18	16
Seat change	▲9	▼9
Popular vote	239,003	186,688
Percentage	55.28%	43.18%
Seats up	3	14
Seats won	11	6

Holds and gains
Democratic hold
Republican gain Republican hold
Democratic
40–50%
50–60%
60–70%
Republican
50–60%
60–70%
70–80%
>90%
Senate President before election
Jeff Kessler
Democratic
Elected Senate President
Bill Cole
Republican

The 2014 West Virginia Senate election took place on Tuesday, November 4, 2014, to elect members to the 82nd and 83rd Legislatures; held concurrently with the U.S. House, and U.S. Senate elections. State senate seats in West Virginia are staggered, with senators serving 4-year terms. 17 of the 34 state senate seats were up for election. The Republicans won in a landslide, flipping 8 Democratic seats and securing a majority in the chamber after the defection of Democratic senator Daniel Hall the day after the election.

== Predictions ==
Source	Ranking	As of
Governing	Likely D	October 20, 2014

== Results ==
Summary of the 2014 West Virginia Senate election results
Party	Candidates	Votes	%	Seats				
Party	Candidates	Votes	%	Before 81st Leg.	Up	Won	After 82nd Leg.	+/–
Republican	17	239,003	55.28	9	3	11	18	▲9
Democratic	16	186,688	43.18	25	14	6	16	▼9
Libertarian	1	2,192	0.51	0	0	0	0	Steady
Constitution	2	1,722	0.40	0	0	0	0	Steady
American Freedom	2	1,560	0.36	0	0	0	0	Steady
Mountain	1	1,221	0.28	0	0	0	0	Steady
Total		432,386	100%	34	17		34	Steady

Popular vote
Republican	55.28%
Democratic	43.18%
Libertarian	0.51%
Constitution	0.40%
American Freedom	0.36%
Mountain	0.28%

Seats won
Republican	82.35%
Democratic	17.65%

Total senate seats
Republican	52.94%
Democratic	47.06%

== SD 1 ==
2014 West Virginia SD 1 general election
Party	Candidate	Votes	%
Republican	Ryan Ferns	13,762	51.8
Democratic	Rocky Fitzsimmons (incumbent)	12,821	48.2
Total votes		26,583	100.0
Republican gain from Democratic			

== SD 2 ==
2014 West Virginia SD 2 general election
Party	Candidate	Votes	%
Republican	Kent Leonhardt	13,034	50.0
Democratic	Larry Edgell (incumbent)	12,358	47.4
Constitution	Jeffrey Jarrell	681	2.6
Total votes		26,073	100.0
Republican gain from Democratic			

== SD 3 ==
2014 West Virginia SD 3 general election
Party	Candidate	Votes	%
Republican	David Nohe (incumbent)	19,321	76.3
Democratic	Robin Wilson	6,014	23.7
Total votes		25,335	100.0
Republican hold			

== SD 4 ==
2014 West Virginia SD 4 general election
Party	Candidate	Votes	%
Republican	Mike Hall (incumbent)	22,561	100.0
Total votes		22,561	100.0
Republican hold			

== SD 5 ==
2014 West Virginia SD 5 general election
Party	Candidate	Votes	%
Democratic	Mike Woelfel	12,511	49.8
Republican	Vicki Dunn-Marshall	11,818	47.0
American Freedom	Roy Ramey	793	3.2
Total votes		25,122	100.0
Democratic hold			

== SD 6 ==
2014 West Virginia SD 6 general election
Party	Candidate	Votes	%
Republican	Mark Maynard	11,620	50.8
Democratic	H. Truman Chafin (incumbent)	11,245	49.2
Total votes		22,865	100.0
Republican gain from Democratic			

== SD 7 ==
2014 West Virginia SD 7 general election
Party	Candidate	Votes	%
Democratic	Ron Stollings (incumbent)	14,177	65.7
Republican	Gary Johngrass	7,394	34.3
Total votes		21,571	100.0
Democratic hold			

== SD 8 ==
2014 West Virginia SD 8 general election
Party	Candidate	Votes	%
Republican	Ed Gaunch	14,094	53.0
Democratic	Erik Wells (incumbent)	11,472	43.1
Constitution	Mike Fisher	1,041	3.9
Total votes		26,607	100.0
Republican gain from Democratic			

== SD 9 ==
2014 West Virginia SD 9 general election
Party	Candidate	Votes	%
Republican	Jeff Mullins	14,465	56.9
Democratic	Mike Green (incumbent)	10,970	43.1
Total votes		25,435	100.0
Republican gain from Democratic			

== SD 10 ==
2014 West Virginia SD 10 general election
Party	Candidate	Votes	%
Democratic	Ronald F. Miller (incumbent)	13,776	53.8
Republican	Duane Zobrist	11,815	46.2
Total votes		25,591	100.0
Democratic hold			

== SD 11 ==
2014 West Virginia SD 11 general election
Party	Candidate	Votes	%
Republican	Robert L. Karnes	15,171	55.6
Democratic	Gregory Tucker (incumbent)	12,122	44.4
Total votes		27,293	100.0
Republican gain from Democratic			

== SD 12 ==
2014 West Virginia SD 12 general election
Party	Candidate	Votes	%
Democratic	Mike Romano	14,063	50.0
Republican	Mike Queen	11,850	42.2
Libertarian	Patrick Smith	2,192	7.8
Total votes		28,105	100.0
Democratic hold			

== SD 13 ==
2014 West Virginia SD 13 general election
Party	Candidate	Votes	%
Democratic	Bob Beach (incumbent)	12,061	51.5
Republican	Kris Warner	10,596	45.2
American Freedom	Harry Bertram	767	3.3
Total votes		23,424	100.0
Democratic hold			

== SD 14 ==
2014 West Virginia SD 14 general election
Party	Candidate	Votes	%
Republican	David Sypolt (incumbent)	17,283	65.4
Democratic	Stan Shaver	9,160	34.6
Total votes		26,443	100.0
Republican hold			

== SD 15 ==
2014 West Virginia SD 15 general election
Party	Candidate	Votes	%
Republican	Charles S. Trump IV	17,609	67.1
Democratic	Donald Cookman (incumbent)	8,622	32.9
Total votes		26,231	100.0
Republican gain from Democratic			

== SD 16 ==
2014 West Virginia SD 16 general election
Party	Candidate	Votes	%
Democratic	John Unger (incumbent)	12,287	52.5
Republican	Larry Faircloth	11,122	47.5
Total votes		23,409	100.0
Democratic hold			

== SD 17 ==
2014 West Virginia SD 17 general election
Party	Candidate	Votes	%
Republican	Tom Takubo	15,488	52.1
Democratic	Doug Skaff Jr.	13,029	43.8
Mountain	Jesse Johnson	1,221	4.1
Total votes		29,738	100.0
Republican gain from Democratic			

== See also ==
- 2014 United States Senate election in West Virginia
- 2014 United States House of Representatives elections in West Virginia
