= Richie Robb =

American lawyer, politician (born 1946)

Member-elect of the West Virginia Senate from the 17th district district
- Assuming office January 2027
- Succeeding: Anne Charnock

Mayor of South Charleston, West Virginia
- In office July 1, 1975 – June 30, 2007
- Succeeded by: Frank Mullens

Personal details
- Born: March 1, 1946 (age 80) Huntington, West Virginia, U.S.
- Party: Democratic (2005–present); Republican (1976–2005)
- Spouse: V’icky
- Children: 2
- Education: Marshall University (B.A.); Capital University Law School (J.D.)
- Profession: Lawyer

Richard Allen Robb (born March 1, 1946) is an American politician and lawyer in West Virginia who gained notoriety during the 2004 United States presidential election.

Robb had been mayor of South Charleston, West Virginia, from 1975 until leaving office in 2007, making him the state's longest serving mayor. He first ventured into statewide politics in the unpaid chairman of the state Republican Party for a brief period in the early 1990s.

In 2004, he entered a six candidate primary for the Republican nomination for Governor of West Virginia, finishing fifth. This was only the first seriously contended Republican primary for a major office since 1988 and one of only four since 1930, when that party lost control of the state. In an effort to unify the party, the winning candidate had the state convention appoint the five losers as the state's five Electors in the Electoral College, rather than the traditional slate of party loyalists.

Robb then appeared on CNN and announced that he was a "free agent" and opposed the policies of George W. Bush. He announced that he would not cast the "deciding vote" for him. In the end, the electoral results were not close and Robb chose not to be a "faithless Elector".

He then changed his registration to Democratic and declared his opposition to the war in Iraq. He ran for the nomination for the United States Congress in the state's second district on a "peace platform" against three other candidates and finished a distant third.

Since leaving the mayor's office, he has represented several small cities in the state as municipal counsel. In 2010, Robb challenged incumbent state senator Erik Wells, but lost in the Democratic primary.

He ran in the 2026 West Virginia Senate election as the Democratic candidate in the 17th district; he won the general election, defeating incumbent Anne Charnock.
