= Chris Walters =

American politician (born 1986)

Member of the West Virginia Senate from the 8th district
- In office January 9, 2013 – January 11, 2017
- Preceded by: Corey Palumbo
- Succeeded by: Glenn Jeffries

Personal details
- Born: Chris Wesley Walters; May 1, 1986 (age 40) Charleston, West Virginia, U.S.
- Party: Republican
- Spouse: Elizabeth
- Children: 2
- Parent(s): Ron Walters; Debra Walters
- Education: West Virginia University (BA)
- Website: Official website

Chris Wesley Walters (born May 1, 1986) is an American politician and a former Republican member of the West Virginia Senate representing District 8 between 2013 and 2017.

== Elections ==
- 2012 With incumbent Senator Dan Foster redistricted to District 17, and not seeking re-election Walters was unopposed for the District 8 May 8, 2012 Republican Primary, winning with 4,261 votes, and won the November 6, 2012 General election with 19,242 votes (52.8%) against Democratic nominee Joshua Martin.
- 2010 When House District 44 incumbent Democratic Representative Robert Beach ran for West Virginia Senate and left a seat open, Walters, who was attending West Virginia University at the time, placed second in the six-way May 11, 2010 Republican Primary with 1,923 votes (23.3%), but only placed fifth in the ten-way four-position November 2, 2010 General election behind Representatives Charlene Marshall (D) and Barbara Fleischauer (D), challengers Amanda Pasdon (R) and Anthony Barill (D), and ahead of nominees Stephen Cook (D), Kevin Poe (R), Kevin Patrick (R), Independent Paul Brown, and Libertarian Tad Britch.
