= Sharon Malcolm =

American politician (1947–2019)

succ Sharon Malcolm

Member of the West Virginia House of Delegates from the 39th district
- In office March 30, 2018 – September 3, 2019
- Appointed by: Jim Justice
- Preceded by: Ron Walters
- Succeeded by: T. Kevan Bartlett

Personal details
- Born: July 11, 1947 Park Lake, Michigan, U.S.
- Died: September 30, 2019 (aged 72) Charleston, West Virginia, U.S.
- Party: Republican
- Children: 2
- Profession: retired state employee

M. Sharon Lewis Malcolm (July 11, 1947 – September 30, 2019) was an American politician.

Malcolm was born in Park Lake, Michigan. She served in the West Virginia House of Delegates from 2018 until her death. Malcolm was a Republican. Prior to her appointment to the House of Delegates, she served as the Assistant Doorkeeper for the West Virginia House of Delegates, and later as the Assistant Sergeant-at-Arms for the West Virginia Senate.
