= Ranson =

Ranson is an English surname, and may refer to:

- Arthur Ranson (born 1939), English comic book illustrator
- C. Kyle Ranson, President and CEO of InFocus
- Don Ranson, Australian archaeologist specializing in Tasmania
- Ernita Lascelles Ranson (1890–1972), English actress, novelist, and playwright
- Jack Ranson (1909–1992), English footballer
- Joe Ranson (1900–1945), American league catcher
- Joseph Ranson (1906–1964), Irish Catholic priest, archivist, and historian
- J. B. Ranson (1860–1935), British sea captain, commander of White Star Line liners
- J. M. Ranson (born 1938), English rugby union player
- Lois Ranson (1921–2021), American film actress
- Marcelle Ranson-Hervé (1929–2020), French actress
- Molly Ranson, American actress and singer
- Patricia Ranson (1937–2011), American politician
- Paul Ranson (1864–1909), French painter and writer
- Ray Ranson (born 1960), English entrepreneur and former footballer
- Thomas Davis Ranson (1843–1918), Confederate States Army veteran, lawyer
- Trevor Ranson (1912-1996), Australian rules footballer
- Trish Ranson (born 1969), American politician

== See also ==
- Ranson, West Virginia, an American city
- Ranson criteria, conditions for assessing the mortality risk of acute pancreatitis
- Ranson's Folly, a series of Western works
- Ransons, Virginia, unincorporated American community
- Académie Ranson, private art school in Paris established by Paul Ranson
