= 2004 United States presidential election in West Virginia =

- November 2, 2004
- Turnout: 65.85% (of registered voters); 54.74% (of voting age population)

| Nominee | George W. Bush | John Kerry |
| Party | Republican | Democratic |
| Home state | Texas | Massachusetts |
| Running mate | Dick Cheney | John Edwards |
| Electoral vote | 5 | 0 |
| Popular vote | 423,778 | 326,541 |
| Percentage | 56.06% | 43.20% |

Bush
40–50%
50–60%
60–70%
70–80%
80–90%
Kerry
50–60%
60–70%
President before election
George W. Bush
Republican
Elected President
George W. Bush
Republican

The 2004 United States presidential election in West Virginia took place on November 2, 2004, and was part of the 2004 United States presidential election. Voters chose five representatives, or electors, to the Electoral College, who voted for president and vice president.

West Virginia was won by incumbent President George W. Bush by a 12.86% margin of victory. Prior to the election, 8 of 12 news organizations considered this a state Bush would win, or otherwise considered as a red state, while others considered it a swing state. Democratic President Bill Clinton easily won this state in 1992 and 1996, but Bush carried the state in 2000 with just 51.92% of the vote. West Virginia is the only state to vote against George H. W. Bush both times and vote for George W. Bush both times. On election day, President Bush won here with a 6.53% better margin than his performance in 2000, signaling that the state was trending Republican at the presidential level. This was despite the fact that more than 50% of the state's population were registered Democrats, and both senators were Democrats.

This also marked the last election in which West Virginia voted for the same presidential candidate as neighboring Virginia, and the first election since 1944 in which West Virginia voted more Republican than Virginia. In all subsequent U.S. presidential races since 2004, the Republican nominee won West Virginia while the Democratic nominee won Virginia. This is the last presidential election in which Fayette County, Brooke County, Logan County, and Mingo County voted Democratic. Bush was the first Republican since William McKinley in 1900 to carry West Virginia twice.

== Campaign ==
=== Predictions ===
There were 12 news organizations who made state-by-state predictions of the election. Here are their last predictions before election day.

| Source | Ranking |
|---|---|
| D.C. Political Report | Likely R |
| Associated Press | Toss-up |
| CNN | Likely R |
| Cook Political Report | Lean R |
| Newsweek | Lean R |
| New York Times | Lean R |
| Rasmussen Reports | Likely R |
| Research 2000 | Toss-up |
| Washington Post | Toss-up |
| Washington Times | Toss-up |
| Zogby International | Likely R |
| Washington Dispatch | Likely R |

=== Polling ===
Early on, pre-election polling showed the election as a pure tossup. After September 14, Bush pulled ahead and reached 50% or higher in the polls. The average of the final three polls showed Bush leading 50% to 44%.

=== Fundraising ===
Bush raised $527,380. Kerry raised $627,425.

=== Advertising and visits ===
Bush visited the state eight times; Kerry visited the state six times. A total of between $100,000 and $550,000 was spent each week. As the election went on, both tickets spent less and less here each week.

== Analysis ==
More than any other state, West Virginia highlighted Kerry's trouble in Appalachian America. It swung heavily to the Democrats during the days of Franklin D. Roosevelt, and remained reliably Democratic for most of the next 68 years. The state voted for Democrats (such as Jimmy Carter and Mike Dukakis) who went on to big national defeats. This was largely due to its blue-collar, heavily unionized workers, especially coal miners, who favored Democratic economic policy.

Starting with George W. Bush, however, the state's voters became more receptive to Republicans.

== Results ==
2004 United States presidential election in West Virginia
| Party | Candidate | Running mate | Popular vote | | Electoral vote | | Swing |
| Party | Candidate | Running mate | Count | % | Count | % | Swing |
|---|---|---|---|---|---|---|---|
| Republican | George W. Bush of Texas (incumbent) | Dick Cheney of Wyoming (incumbent) | 423,778 | 56.06% | 5 | 100.00% | ▲4.14% |
| Democratic | John Kerry of Massachusetts | John Edwards of North Carolina | 326,541 | 43.20% | 0 | 0.00% | ▼2.39% |
| Independent | Ralph Nader of Connecticut | Peter Camejo of California | 4,063 | 0.54% | 0 | 0.00% | ▲0.54% |
| Libertarian | Michael Badnarik of Texas | Richard Campagna of Iowa | 1,405 | 0.19% | 0 | 0.00% | ▼0.11% |
| Write-in | Michael Peroutka of Maryland | of - | 82 | 0.01% | 0 | 0.00% | Steady |
| Independent | John Kennedy (write-in) of - | of - | 13 | 0.00% | 0 | 0.00% | Steady |
| Mountain | David Cobb (write-in) of Texas | Pat LaMarche of Maine | 5 | 0.00% | 0 | 0.00% | ▼1.65% |
| Total | | | 755,887 | 100.00% | 5 | 100.00% | |

=== By county ===
| County | George W. Bush Republican | | John Kerry Democratic | | Various candidates Other parties | | Margin | | Total |
| County | # | % | # | % | # | % | # | % | Total |
|---|---|---|---|---|---|---|---|---|---|
| Barbour | 4,004 | 60.17% | 2,610 | 39.22% | 41 | 0.62% | 1,394 | 20.95% | 6,655 |
| Berkeley | 21,293 | 63.03% | 12,244 | 36.24% | 248 | 0.73% | 9,049 | 26.79% | 33,785 |
| Boone | 4,207 | 41.25% | 5,933 | 58.18% | 58 | 0.57% | -1,726 | -16.93% | 10,198 |
| Braxton | 2,986 | 49.35% | 3,035 | 50.16% | 30 | 0.50% | -49 | -0.81% | 6,051 |
| Brooke | 5,189 | 48.17% | 5,493 | 50.99% | 91 | 0.85% | -304 | -2.82% | 10,773 |
| Cabell | 21,035 | 55.43% | 16,583 | 43.70% | 332 | 0.87% | 4,452 | 11.73% | 37,950 |
| Calhoun | 1,588 | 54.97% | 1,266 | 43.82% | 35 | 1.22% | 322 | 11.15% | 2,889 |
| Clay | 2,198 | 53.98% | 1,835 | 45.06% | 39 | 0.95% | 363 | 8.92% | 4,072 |
| Doddridge | 2,362 | 74.30% | 800 | 25.17% | 17 | 0.54% | 1,562 | 49.13% | 3,179 |
| Fayette | 7,881 | 46.45% | 8,971 | 52.87% | 115 | 0.68% | -1,090 | -6.42% | 16,967 |
| Gilmer | 1,665 | 58.38% | 1,159 | 40.64% | 28 | 0.99% | 506 | 17.74% | 2,852 |
| Grant | 4,063 | 80.50% | 963 | 19.08% | 21 | 0.42% | 3,100 | 61.42% | 5,047 |
| Greenbrier | 8,358 | 57.43% | 6,084 | 41.81% | 111 | 0.77% | 2,274 | 15.62% | 14,553 |
| Hampshire | 5,489 | 68.65% | 2,455 | 30.70% | 52 | 0.65% | 3,034 | 37.95% | 7,996 |
| Hancock | 7,298 | 50.96% | 6,906 | 48.22% | 117 | 0.82% | 392 | 2.74% | 14,321 |
| Hardy | 3,635 | 68.90% | 1,617 | 30.65% | 24 | 0.46% | 2,018 | 38.25% | 5,276 |
| Harrison | 17,111 | 55.94% | 13,238 | 43.28% | 239 | 0.79% | 3,873 | 12.66% | 30,588 |
| Jackson | 7,686 | 58.41% | 5,384 | 40.92% | 88 | 0.66% | 2,302 | 17.49% | 13,158 |
| Jefferson | 10,539 | 52.71% | 9,301 | 46.52% | 153 | 0.77% | 1,238 | 6.19% | 19,993 |
| Kanawha | 44,430 | 50.53% | 43,010 | 48.92% | 488 | 0.55% | 1,420 | 1.61% | 87,928 |
| Lewis | 4,445 | 63.51% | 2,475 | 35.36% | 79 | 1.13% | 1,970 | 28.15% | 6,999 |
| Lincoln | 4,102 | 49.35% | 4,048 | 48.70% | 162 | 1.95% | 54 | 0.65% | 8,312 |
| Logan | 7,047 | 47.02% | 7,877 | 52.56% | 63 | 0.42% | -830 | -5.54% | 14,987 |
| Marion | 12,150 | 48.23% | 12,771 | 50.69% | 273 | 1.08% | -621 | -2.46% | 25,194 |
| Marshall | 8,516 | 56.50% | 6,435 | 42.70% | 121 | 0.80% | 2,081 | 13.80% | 15,072 |
| Mason | 6,487 | 54.10% | 5,408 | 45.10% | 95 | 0.80% | 1,079 | 9.00% | 11,990 |
| McDowell | 2,762 | 37.84% | 4,501 | 61.67% | 36 | 0.49% | -1,739 | -23.83% | 7,299 |
| Mercer | 13,057 | 58.34% | 9,178 | 41.01% | 144 | 0.64% | 3,879 | 17.33% | 22,379 |
| Mineral | 7,854 | 68.53% | 3,518 | 30.70% | 89 | 0.78% | 4,336 | 37.83% | 11,461 |
| Mingo | 4,612 | 43.28% | 5,983 | 56.15% | 60 | 0.56% | -1,371 | -12.87% | 10,655 |
| Monongalia | 17,670 | 51.51% | 16,313 | 47.55% | 323 | 0.95% | 1,357 | 3.96% | 34,306 |
| Monroe | 3,590 | 60.33% | 2,311 | 38.83% | 50 | 0.84% | 1,279 | 21.50% | 5,951 |
| Morgan | 4,511 | 65.88% | 2,272 | 33.18% | 64 | 0.93% | 2,239 | 32.70% | 6,847 |
| Nicholas | 5,485 | 52.99% | 4,788 | 46.26% | 78 | 0.75% | 697 | 6.73% | 10,351 |
| Ohio | 11,694 | 57.35% | 8,543 | 41.89% | 155 | 0.76% | 3,151 | 15.46% | 20,392 |
| Pendleton | 2,146 | 60.55% | 1,381 | 38.97% | 17 | 0.48% | 765 | 21.58% | 3,544 |
| Pleasants | 2,061 | 60.00% | 1,349 | 39.27% | 25 | 0.73% | 712 | 20.73% | 3,435 |
| Pocahontas | 2,295 | 58.58% | 1,573 | 40.15% | 50 | 1.27% | 722 | 18.43% | 3,918 |
| Preston | 7,855 | 65.85% | 3,963 | 33.22% | 111 | 0.93% | 3,892 | 32.63% | 11,929 |
| Putnam | 15,716 | 62.49% | 9,301 | 36.98% | 134 | 0.53% | 6,415 | 25.51% | 25,151 |
| Raleigh | 18,519 | 60.67% | 11,815 | 38.71% | 191 | 0.62% | 6,704 | 21.96% | 30,525 |
| Randolph | 6,512 | 56.68% | 4,892 | 42.58% | 86 | 0.75% | 1,620 | 14.10% | 11,490 |
| Ritchie | 3,086 | 73.55% | 1,070 | 25.50% | 40 | 0.95% | 2,016 | 48.05% | 4,196 |
| Roane | 3,440 | 56.39% | 2,612 | 42.82% | 48 | 0.79% | 828 | 13.57% | 6,100 |
| Summers | 2,978 | 53.91% | 2,504 | 45.33% | 42 | 0.76% | 474 | 8.58% | 5,524 |
| Taylor | 3,893 | 59.43% | 2,617 | 39.95% | 41 | 0.62% | 1,276 | 19.48% | 6,551 |
| Tucker | 2,179 | 60.53% | 1,400 | 38.89% | 21 | 0.58% | 779 | 21.64% | 3,600 |
| Tyler | 2,798 | 65.91% | 1,401 | 33.00% | 46 | 1.09% | 1,397 | 32.91% | 4,245 |
| Upshur | 6,191 | 66.62% | 3,034 | 32.65% | 68 | 0.73% | 3,157 | 33.97% | 9,293 |
| Wayne | 10,070 | 54.11% | 8,411 | 45.20% | 128 | 0.69% | 1,659 | 8.91% | 18,609 |
| Webster | 1,724 | 46.42% | 1,965 | 52.91% | 25 | 0.67% | -241 | -6.49% | 3,714 |
| Wetzel | 3,656 | 51.95% | 3,330 | 47.31% | 52 | 0.74% | 326 | 4.64% | 7,038 |
| Wirt | 1,727 | 65.07% | 896 | 33.76% | 31 | 1.17% | 831 | 31.31% | 2,654 |
| Wood | 24,948 | 63.60% | 14,025 | 35.75% | 254 | 0.65% | 10,923 | 27.85% | 39,227 |
| Wyoming | 4,985 | 57.18% | 3,694 | 42.37% | 39 | 0.45% | 1,291 | 14.81% | 8,718 |
| Totals | 423,778 | 56.06% | 326,541 | 43.20% | 5,568 | 0.74% | 97,237 | 12.86% | 755,887 |

==== Counties that flipped from Democratic to Republican ====
- Harrison (largest city: Clarksburg)
- Kanawha (largest city: Charleston)
- Lincoln (largest city: Hamlin)
- Wyoming (largest city: Mullens)

=== By congressional district ===
Bush won all three congressional districts, including two held by Democrats.

| District | Bush | Kerry | Representative |
|---|---|---|---|
| 1st | 58% | 42% | Alan Mollohan |
| 2nd | 57% | 42% | Shelley Moore Capito |
| 3rd | 53% | 46% | Nick Rahall |

== Electors ==
Technically the voters of West Virginia cast their ballots for electors: representatives to the Electoral College. West Virginia is allocated five electors because it has three congressional districts and two senators. All candidates who appear on the ballot or qualify to receive write-in votes must submit a list of five electors, who pledge to vote for their candidate and his or her running mate. Whoever wins the majority of votes in the state is awarded all five electoral votes. Their chosen electors then vote for president and vice president. Although electors are pledged to their candidate and running mate, they are not obligated to vote for them. An elector who votes for someone other than his or her candidate is known as a faithless elector.

The electors of each state and the District of Columbia met on December 13, 2004, to cast their votes for president and vice president. The Electoral College itself never meets as one body. Instead, the electors from each state and the District of Columbia met in their respective capitols.

The following were the members of the Electoral College from the state. All five were pledged for Bush/Cheney:

1. Rob Capehart
2. Doug McKinney
3. Dan Moore
4. Richie Robb
5. Larry Faircloth
