= Ron Walters (politician) =

American politician (born 1950)

Member of the West Virginia House of Delegates from the 39th district
- In office January 12, 2013 – early 2019
- Preceded by: Bill Hamilton
- Succeeded by: Sharon Malcolm

Member of the West Virginia House of Delegates from the 32nd district
- In office January 2001 – January 2013
- Preceded by: Art Ashley

Member of the West Virginia House of Delegates from the 32nd district
- In office January 1993 – January 1999
- Succeeded by: Art Ashley

Personal details
- Born: June 29, 1950 (age 76) Washington, D.C., U.S.
- Party: Republican
- Spouse: Debra Walters
- Children: Chris Walters
- Education: University of Michigan; Michigan School of Economics

Ronald Neal Walters Sr. (born June 29, 1950) is an American politician who was a Republican member of the West Virginia House of Delegates representing District 39 from January 12, 2013 to 2019. Walters served consecutively from January 2001 until January 2013 and non-consecutively from January 1993 until January 1999 in a District 32 seat. Walters was a candidate for West Virginia Senate in 1998.

== Education ==
Walters earned his BS in economics from the University of Michigan and his MA in medical economics from the Michigan School of Economics.

== Elections ==
- 2012 Redistricted to District 39, and with incumbent Bill Hamilton redistricted to District 45, Walters and returning Democratic challenger Clint Casto were both unopposed for their May 8, 2012 primaries, setting up a head-to-head contest; Walters won the November 6, 2012 General election with 4,167 votes (64.9%) against Casto.
- 1990s Walters was initially elected in a District 32 seat in the 1992 Republican Primary and November 3, 1992, General election, and re-elected in the general elections of November 8, 1994, November 5, 1996, and November 3, 1998.
- 2000 When the Senate District 17 seat was left vacant, Walters won the three-way 2000 Republican Primary but lost the November 7, 2000 General election to Democratic nominee Brooks McCabe.
- 2002 When House District 32 Representative Art Ashley ran for West Virginia Senate and left a district seat open, Walters placed in the six-way 2002 Republican Primary and was re-elected to the seat alongside incumbents Tim Armstead (R), Steve Harrison (R), and Rusty Webb (R) in the eight-way four-position November 5, 2002 General election.
- 2004 When Representative Webb ran for West Virginia Senate and left a district seat open, Walters placed in the five-way 2004 Republican Primary, and was elected in the six-way three-position November 2, 2004 General election with incumbent Tim Armstead (R) and Republican nominee Patrick Lane, who had run for state senate in 2002.
- 2006 Walters and Representatives Armstead and Lane were unopposed for the 2006 Republican Primary and were re-elected in the six-way three-position November 7, 2006 General election against Democratic nominees John Cain, Lucille Chandler, and Jim Francis.
- 2008 Walters and Representatives Armstead and Lane were unopposed for the May 13, 2008 Republican Primary, where Walters placed second with 2,457 votes (32.4%), and placed second in the six-way three-position November 4, 2008 General election with 10,098 votes (20.0%) behind Representative Armstead (R) and ahead of Representative Lane (R) and Democratic nominees returning 2006 opponent John Cain, Carmela Ryan-Thompson, and Charles Black.
- 2010 Walters and Representatives Armstead and Lane were unopposed for the May 11, 2010 Republican Primary, where Walters placed second with 1,609 votes (32.2%), and placed second in the seven-way three-position November 2, 2010 General election with 8,251 votes (20.9%) behind Representative Armstead (R) and ahead of Representative Lane (R) and Democratic nominees Clint Casto, Philip Lavigne, returning 2008 challenger Charles Black, and Mountain Party candidate Jesse Johnson.
