= Andrew Bird (disambiguation) =

Andrew Bird (born 1973) is an American musician.

Andrew Bird may also refer to:

- Andrew Bird (film editor) (born 1956), British film editor
- Andrew Bird (rowing) (born 1967), New Zealand rowing cox
- Andy Bird, British executive and former Disney chairman
- Andy Bird, British screenwriter and inspiration for Madonna's song "Beautiful Stranger"

== See also ==
- Andrew Byrd (born 1982), American politician
