= T. Kevan Bartlett =

American politician

Member of the West Virginia Senate from the 8th district
- Incumbent
- Assumed office February 6, 2025 Serving with Glenn Jeffries
- Preceded by: Mark Hunt

Member of the West Virginia House of Delegates from the 39th district
- In office October 29, 2019 – 2020
- Preceded by: Sharon Malcolm
- Succeeded by: Dana Ferrell

Personal details
- Born: Chattanooga, Tennessee, U.S.
- Party: Republican
- Spouse: Linda Bartlett

T. Kevan Bartlett is an American politician serving as a Republican member of the West Virginia Senate for the 8th district. He was appointed by governor Patrick Morrisey to fill the vacancy left by Mark Hunt, who resigned to become State Auditor. Bartlett is the pastor of Maranatha Baptist Church in Charleston, West Virginia. In October 2019, due to the death of Sharon Malcolm, governor Jim Justice appointed Bartlett to the West Virginia House of Delegates, representing the 39th district. Bartlett was born in Chattanooga, Tennessee, and is married with two children. In the West Virginia Senate, he has served on several committees, including Judiciary, Pensions, Education, and Health and Human Resources, and has held leadership roles such as vice chair of the Judiciary and Pensions committees.
