= John Harker =

American businessman

John V. Harker is the former chairman of the InFocus corporation located in Wilsonville, Oregon. He had been the president and CEO of the company since 1992 before Kyle Ranson took his place on September 1, 2004. He resigned as chairman on December 1, 2005.

== Business life ==
John Harker started work at InFocus in 1992 and has transformed the company from being a small startup selling business projectors to a thriving business with many display products. Products that have been developed under his leadership include a variety of business projectors as well as home theatre projection and DLP Rear Projection televisions.

John Harker served a variety of roles before coming to work with the InFocus corporation. He was an Executive Vice President at GENICOM Corporation (1984–1992), the Senior Vice President of Marketing and Corporate Development at Dataproducts Corporation (1982–1984), the Vice President of Booz, Allen, and Hamilton (1979–1982), and as a manager at IBM (1963–1979).

Currently, the combined salary and benefits package for Mr. Harker is about $841,000 per year. This makes him the highest paid person at the InFocus Corporation.

== Community service ==
John Harker currently chairs the Business Advisory Council at the school of business administration at Portland State University, and is on the Business Advisory Council at the Leeds school of Business at the University of Colorado. He also has served on the Board of Trustees for the Oregon Museum of Science and Industry since 1997 and was the board chair from June 2003 to June 2004.

Mr. Harker is also involved with the American Electronics Association. He currently serves as the Chairman of the National Board of the group and is on the council for the local chapter in Oregon. With the AEA, Harker has brought the spotlight on China and the manufacturing concerns of American corporations.

== Personal life ==
John was born in Denison, Iowa and is married to wife Judith (née Skelley). He has three children, John Jr., Julie, and James. He currently resides in Lake Oswego, Oregon and enjoys a variety of outside activities. He attended the University of Colorado and holds a Bachelor of Science degree in Marketing.
