= Anne Charnock (politician) =

American politician

Member of the West Virginia Senate from the 17th district
- Incumbent
- Assumed office February 4, 2025 Serving with Tom Takubo
- Preceded by: Eric Nelson

Personal details
- Born: Charleston, West Virginia, U.S.
- Party: Republican
- Education: West Virginia University

Anne B. Charnock is an American politician serving as a Republican member of the West Virginia Senate for the 17th district. In February 2025, she was appointed by governor Patrick Morrisey to fill the vacancy left by Eric Nelson. She is an attorney who formerly served as a judge on the Municipal Court of Charleston for 12 years. She attended George Washington High School in Charleston, West Virginia, and graduated from West Virginia University with both a Bachelor of Arts and a Juris Doctor.

Charnock was defeated by Richie Robb in November 2026.
