= Eric Nelson (West Virginia politician) =

American politician

Member of the West Virginia Senate from the 17th district
- In office December 1, 2020 – January 13, 2025
- Preceded by: Corey Palumbo
- Succeeded by: Anne Charnock

Member of West Virginia House of Delegates
- In office January 12, 2013 – December 1, 2020
- Succeeded by: Larry Pack
- Constituency: 35th district
- In office January 2011 – January 2013
- Succeeded by: Linda Sumner
- Constituency: 30th district

Personal details
- Born: December 4, 1960 (age 65) Charleston, West Virginia, U.S.
- Party: Republican
- Children: 3
- Education: Washington and Lee University
- Website: nelsonforhouse.com

Fredrik Eric Nelson Jr. (born December 4, 1960, in Charleston, West Virginia) is an American politician and a former Republican member of the West Virginia House of Delegates, having represented District 35 from January 12, 2013, until December 1, 2020. Nelson served consecutively from January 2011 until January 2013 in the District 30 seat. After his tenure in the West Virginia House of Delegates, he went on to run for District 17 in the West Virginia Senate, which he subsequently won in November 3, 2020 general election. He served as a State Senator from 2020 to 2025, when he was appointed as revenue secretary in the administration of Governor Patrick Morrisey.

== Education ==
Nelson earned his BS degrees in accounting and business administration from Washington and Lee University.

== Elections ==
- 2012 Redistricted to District 35, Nelson ran in the ten-way May 8, 2012, Republican Primary and placed first with 2,606 votes (18.5%), and placed third in the eight-way four-position November 6, 2012, general election with 13,397 votes (14.2%), behind incumbent Democratic Representative Doug Skaff, fellow Republican Suzette Raines and ahead of fellow Republican selectee John McCuskey and non-selectees incumbent Democratic Representatives Bobbie Hatfield and Bonnie Brown, Democratic nominee Chris Morris, and fellow Republican nominee Fred Joseph.
- 2010 Originally in District 30, O'Neal ran in the eight-way May 11, 2010, Republican Primary and placed first with 2,963 votes (16.0%), and placed second in the fourteen-way seven-position November 2, 2010, general election with 17,603 votes (8.0%) behind incumbent Democratic Representative Doug Skaff and ahead of incumbents Daniel Wells (D), Bobbie Hatfield (D), Bonnie Brown (D), Mark Hunt (D), and Nancy Guthrie (D).

West Virginia Senate
Preceded by Corey Palumbo	Member of the West Virginia Senate from the 17th district 2020–2025	Succeeded by Anne Charnock
