= Glenn Jeffries =

American politician (born 1961)

Member of the West Virginia Senate from the 8th district
- Incumbent
- Assumed office December 1, 2016 Serving with T. Kevan Bartlett
- Preceded by: Chris Walters

Personal details
- Born: July 15, 1961 (age 65) South Charleston, West Virginia, U.S.
- Party: Republican (since 2022)
- Other political affiliations: Democratic (until 2022)
- Education: West Virginia State University
- Profession: Businessman

Glenn Jeffries is an American politician who is a member of the West Virginia Senate, representing the 8th district since January 11, 2017.

Jeffries was a Democrat until December 2022, when he became a Republican.

== Election results ==
West Virginia Senate District 8 (Position B) election, 2016
Party	Candidate	Votes	%
Democratic	Glenn Jeffries	20,768	53.08%
Republican	Chris Walters (incumbent)	18,357	46.92%
Total votes		39,125	100.0%
