= Andrew Byrd =

American politician

Member of the West Virginia House of Delegates from the 35th district
- In office December 1, 2014 – December 2021
- Preceded by: Doug Skaff
- Succeeded by: Kayla Young

Personal details
- Born: July 15, 1982 (age 44) South Charleston, West Virginia, U.S.
- Party: Democratic
- Spouse: Christina Byrd
- Education: West Virginia University (BSBA, JD)
- Occupation: Attorney; Small Business Owner

Andrew Byrd (born July 15, 1982) is an American politician who served in the West Virginia House of Delegates from the 35th district 2014 to 2021.

In July 2020 he was elected second vice chairman of the West Virginia Democratic Party. The term is two years long.
