= Doug Skaff =

American politician (1976–2025)

Minority Leader of the West Virginia House of Delegates
- In office November 30, 2020 – August 8, 2023
- Preceded by: Tim Miley
- Succeeded by: Sean Hornbuckle

Member of the West Virginia House of Delegates
- In office December 1, 2018 – September 8, 2023
- Preceded by: Charlotte Lane
- Succeeded by: Hollis Lewis
- Constituency: 35th district (2018–2022); 57th district (2022–2023)
- In office December 1, 2008 – December 1, 2014
- Preceded by: Dave Higgins; Corey Palumbo
- Succeeded by: Andrew Byrd; Chris Stansbury
- Constituency: 30th district (2008–2012); 35th district (2012–2014)

Personal details
- Born: November 10, 1976 Charleston, West Virginia, U.S.
- Died: June 10, 2025 (aged 48) Lewis County, West Virginia, U.S.
- Party: Republican (2023–2025)
- Other political affiliations: Democratic (until 2023)
- Education: West Virginia University (BS, MS)
- Occupation: Businessman (President, HD Media)

Douglas John Skaff Jr. (November 10, 1976 – June 10, 2025) was an American politician from the state of West Virginia. Skaff served as a member of the West Virginia House of Delegates, most recently representing the 57th district, as a member of the Democratic Party.

== Early life and education ==
Skaff was born on November 10, 1976, in Charleston, West Virginia. He was raised in South Charleston, and earned a Bachelor of Science in Marketing from West Virginia University in 2000, followed by a master's degree in Labor and Industrial Relations, also from West Virginia University.

== Career ==
Skaff was first elected to the West Virginia House of Delegates in 2008 and served three terms. Skaff opted not to seek re-election to the House of Delegates in 2014, instead running to represent the 17th district in the West Virginia Senate. He was defeated by Republican Tom Takubo, and succeeded in the House of Delegates by Andrew Byrd.

In October 2014, Skaff was arrested for driving under the influence of alcohol while in Morgantown to attend a West Virginia Mountaineers football game. In 2015, Skaff was placed on the statewide casino ban list after pleading no contest to cheating while playing blackjack at the Greenbrier resort.

In the 2018 election, Skaff was re-elected to his old seat in the House of Delegates.

In 2020, Skaff became president of HD Media.

On September 8, 2023, Skaff resigned from the House of Delegates. On October 12, Skaff switched to the Republican Party and filed to run for Secretary of State of West Virginia in 2024. He was replaced in the legislature by Hollis Lewis.

== Death ==
Skaff died in a vehicle crash on Interstate 79 in Lewis County, West Virginia, on June 10, 2025. He was 48.

West Virginia House of Delegates
Preceded by Tim Miley	Minority Leader of the West Virginia House of Delegates; 2020–2023	Succeeded by Sean Hornbuckle
