= Ransons, Virginia =

Unincorporated community in Virginia, United States

Coordinates: 37°38′13″N 78°30′41″W

Ransons is an unincorporated community in Buckingham County, in the U.S. state of Virginia.
