= C. Kyle Ranson =

American businessman

Kyle C. Ranson is an American businessman who was the president and CEO of InFocus from August 2004 to May 2007. At the time, InFocus was headquartered in Wilsonville, Oregon. Kyle was originally hired as the executive vice president of worldwide sales and marketing in April 2003, and previously held the same title at Compaq/Hewlett-Packard. He also held positions at Newberry Data and Vickers Defense.

== Career ==
Ranson gained experience with projectors at his position with Compaq, where he helped the company get into the projector market. Ranson was hired by InFocus to concentrate more on product marketing in the digital projector market, instead of previous emphasis on innovation. At the time, company Chairman John Harker expressed the hope that Ranson's international experience and market understanding would help drive the company back to profitability.

In August 2004, InFocus announced that Ranson (then president and chief operation officer) would be the next CEO and a member of the board of directors, replacing John Harker who had led the company since 1992. Harker would continue in the role of chairman.

On 16 May 2007, InFocus announced that Ranson would leave the company to pursue other interests. He also resigned from the company's board of directors.

== Later career ==
In 2008, Ranson invested in Showers Pass, a company founded by Dave Morrow in 1997 and purchased by Ed Dalton in 2005, becoming co-president. Ranson had met Dalton on a cycling tour of Oregon. In 2012, Dalton sold out to Ranson. The company is headquartered in Portland, Oregon, with Ranson as the CEO. In May 2013, the company established a United Kingdom office, with Ranson's brother Fraser Ranson joining the company as head of UK operations.

== Personal life ==
Ranson was born in Newcastle upon Tyne, England, and graduated from Brunel University in 1985 with a BA in design and technology. He has been a trustee of the Oregon chapter of the National Multiple Sclerosis Society and has taken part in fundraising bike rides with Bikes MS150. In 2015, the National Multiple Sclerosis Society announced that Showers Pass would provide an annual sponsorship to improve life for those suffering from MS and contribute to the search for a cure.
