= Ben Queen (politician) =

American politician

Member of the West Virginia Senate from the 12th district
- Incumbent
- Assumed office December 1, 2022 Serving with Patrick S. Martin
- Preceded by: Mike Romano

Member of the West Virginia House of Delegates from the 48th district
- In office December 1, 2016 – December 1, 2022
- Preceded by: Patsy Samuel Trecost
- Succeeded by: New boundaries

Personal details
- Born: February 7, 1995 (age 31) Clarksburg, West Virginia, U.S.
- Party: Republican

Ben Queen (born February 7, 1995) is an American politician serving in the West Virginia Senate, representing the 12th district. He served in the West Virginia House of Delegates from the 48th district from 2016 to 2022.
