= Laura Wakim Chapman =

American politician

Laura Chapman

Member of the West Virginia Senate from the 1st district
- Incumbent
- Assumed office December 1, 2022 Serving with Ryan Weld

Personal details
- Born: Jeannette Laura Wakim; November 26, 1984 (age 41) Wheeling, West Virginia
- Party: Republican
- Parent: Chris Wakim (father)
- Education: Middlebury College
- Alma mater: West Virginia University

Jeannette Laura Wakim Chapman (née Wakim; born November 26, 1984) is an American politician who has served as a member of the West Virginia Senate from the 1st district since the 2022 West Virginia Senate election.

== Legal career ==
Chapman is an attorney by profession.

== Political career ==
In 2024, Chapman endorsed Donald Trump's presidential campaign.

== Personal life ==
Chapmans father is former state legislator Chris Wakim.
