= Tom Takubo =

American politician

Majority Leader of the West Virginia Senate
- In office January 9, 2019 – January 8, 2025
- Preceded by: Ryan Ferns
- Succeeded by: Patrick S. Martin

Member of the West Virginia Senate from the 17th district
- Incumbent
- Assumed office January 14, 2015 Serving with Anne Charnock
- Preceded by: Brooks McCabe

Personal details
- Born: December 14, 1971 (age 54) Columbus, Ohio, U.S.
- Party: Republican
- Education: Marshall University (BS); West Virginia School of Osteopathic Medicine (DO)

Tom Takubo is an American politician who is a Republican member of the West Virginia Senate, representing the 17th district since January 14, 2015.

== Career ==
Takubo also serves as Majority Leader of the West Virginia Senate, succeeding Ryan Ferns, who was defeated in the 2018 West Virginia Senate election. He is a business owner and serves on the medical faculty for West Virginia University.

== Early life and education ==
Takubo's mother is from Logan County and his biological father was from Japan. Takubo's parents divorced when he was a child, and his mother remarried. He attended Marshall University and received his D.O. from the West Virginia School of Osteopathic Medicine.

== Personal life ==
Takubo has three children. He lives in the Southridge area of South Charleston.

== Election results ==
2018: Takubo ran for re-election in 2018 and was unopposed in the May Republican primary. Takubo faced Terrell Ellis, a longtime Kanawha County community and economic developer, in the November general election. Despite being outspent in the race, Takubo beat Ellis by a slim 52.5%-47.5% margin to win a second term.

West Virginia Senate District 17 (Position A) election, 2018
Party	Candidate	Votes	%
Republican	Tom Takubo	18,466	52.46%
Democratic	Terrell Ellis	16,735	47.54%
Total votes		35,201	100.0%

2014: After 16 years in the Senate, Democratic Senator and small business owner Brooks McCabe retired, leaving an open seat in District 17. Takubo, a doctor and small business owner, ran for the seat and faced Lance Wheeler in the Republican primary. Takubo beat Wheeler by a 68%-32% margin to advance to the November general election, where he faced Democratic nominee Delegate and Assistant Majority Whip Doug Skaff and Mountain Party nominee Jesse Johnson. Takubo beat Skaff and Johnson as part of a Republican wave election that saw Republicans take both chambers of the West Virginia Legislature for the first time in eight decades.

West Virginia Senate District 17 (Position A) election, 2014
Party	Candidate	Votes	%
Republican	Tom Takubo	15,488	52.08%
Democratic	Doug Skaff	13,029	43.81%
Mountain	Jesse Johnson	1,221	4.11%
Total votes		29,738	100.0%

- West Virginia Senate District 17 Republican primary, 2014
  Primary election
  Party	Candidate	Votes	%
  Republican	Tom Takubo	3,477	68.16%
  Republican	Lance Wheeler	1,624	31.84%
  Total votes		5,101	100.0%

West Virginia Senate
Preceded by Ryan Ferns	Majority Leader of the West Virginia Senate; 2019–2025	Succeeded by Patrick S. Martin
