= West Virginia's 8th Senate district =

American legislative district

West Virginia's 8th State Senate district
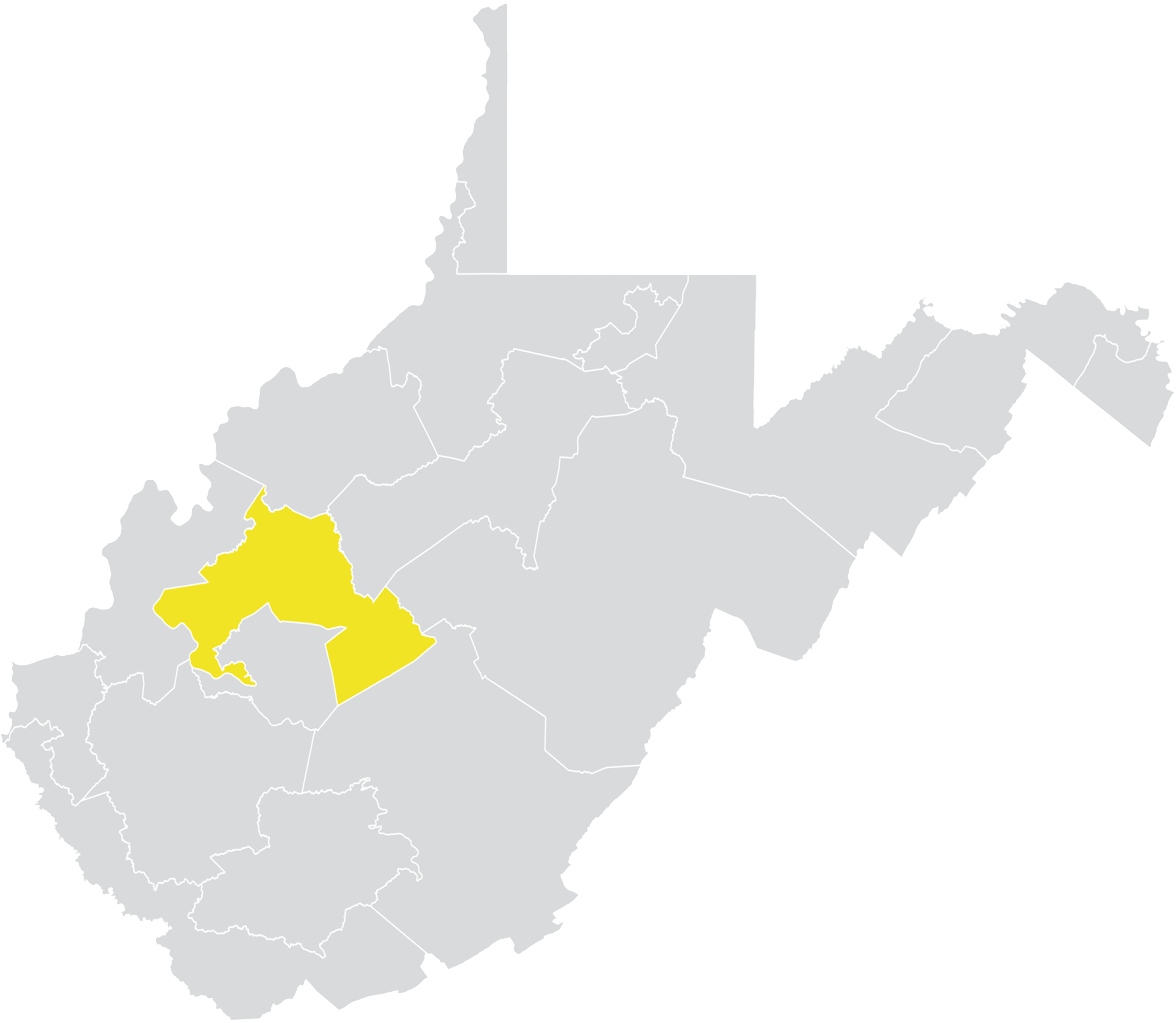
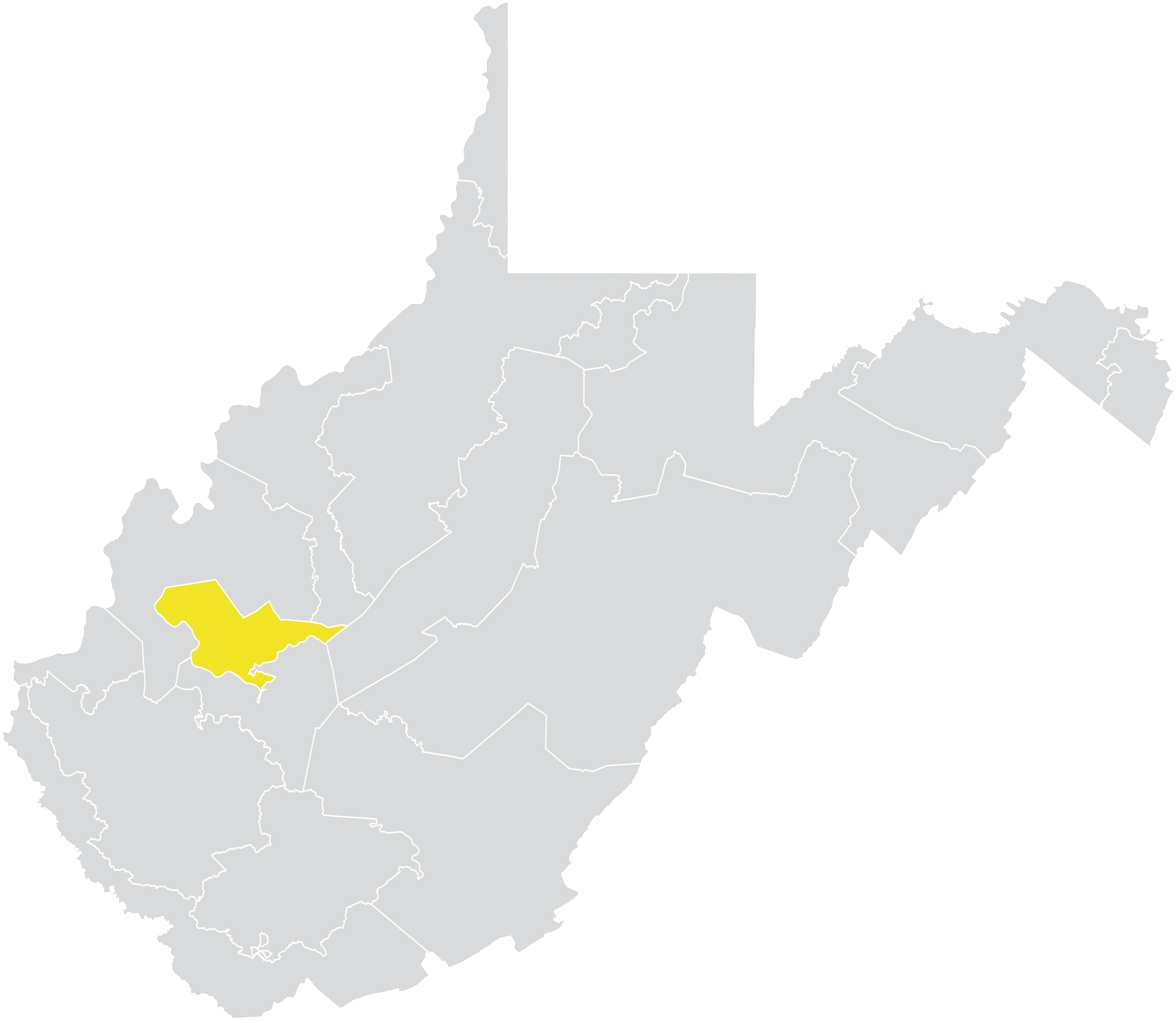
Senator
Mark Hunt; R–Charleston
Glenn Jeffries; R–Red House
- Demographics: 85% White; 9% Black; 1% Hispanic; 1% Asian; 3% Other
- Population (2017): 101,543

West Virginia's 8th Senate district is one of 17 districts in the West Virginia Senate. It is currently represented by Republicans Glenn Jeffries and Mark Hunt. All districts in the West Virginia Senate elect two members to staggered four-year terms.

== Geography ==
District 8 covers parts of Kanawha and Putnam Counties, including much of northern Charleston, the state's capital and largest city. Other communities in the district include Dunbar, Nitro, Cross Lanes, Rand, Sissonville, Buffalo, and Eleanor.

The district is located entirely within West Virginia's 2nd congressional district, and overlaps with the 13th, 35th, 36th, 37th, 38th, 39th, and 40th districts of the West Virginia House of Delegates.

== Recent election results ==
=== 2024 ===
2024 West Virginia Senate election, District 8
Primary election
Party	Candidate	Votes	%
Republican	Glenn Jeffries (incumbent)	8,976	100.0
Total votes		8,976	100.0
General election
Republican	Glenn Jeffries (incumbent)	30,980	100.0
Total votes		30,980	100
Republican hold			

=== 2022 ===
2022 West Virginia Senate election, District 8
Primary election
Party	Candidate	Votes	%
Republican	Mark Hunt (incumbent)	1,801	45.1
Republican	Joshua Higginbotham	1,370	34.3
Republican	Mark Mitchem	821	20.6
Total votes		3,992	100
General election
Republican	Mark Hunt	14,615	56.8
Democratic	Richard Lindsay (incumbent)	11,136	43.2
Total votes		25,751	100
Republican gain from Democratic			

== Historical election results ==
=== 2020 ===
2020 West Virginia Senate election, District 8
Party	Candidate	Votes	%
Democratic	Glenn Jeffries (incumbent)	23,389	55.8
Republican	Kathie Hess Crouse	18,557	44.2
Total votes		41,946	100
Democratic hold			

=== 2018 ===
2018 West Virginia Senate election, District 8
Primary election
Party	Candidate	Votes	%
Democratic	Richard Lindsay	4,721	51.7
Democratic	Mark Hunt	4,407	48.3
Total votes		9,128	100
General election
Democratic	Richard Lindsay	16,537	50.3
Republican	Ed Gaunch (incumbent)	16,372	49.7
Total votes		32,909	100
Democratic gain from Republican			

=== 2016 ===
2016 West Virginia Senate election, District 8
Party	Candidate	Votes	%
Democratic	Glenn Jeffries	20,768	53.1
Republican	Chris Walters (incumbent)	18,357	46.9
Total votes		39,125	100
Democratic gain from Republican			

=== 2014 ===
2014 West Virginia Senate election, District 8
Party	Candidate	Votes	%
Republican	Ed Gaunch	14,094	53.0
Democratic	Erik Wells (incumbent)	11,472	43.1
Constitution	Mike Fisher	1,041	3.9
Total votes		26,607	100
Republican gain from Democratic			

=== 2012 ===
2012 West Virginia Senate election, District 8
Primary election
Party	Candidate	Votes	%
Democratic	Joshua Martin	3,928	54.3
Democratic	Jennifer Scragg Karr	3,307	45.7
Total votes		7,235	100
General election
Republican	Chris Walters	19,242	52.8
Democratic	Joshua Martin	17,184	47.2
Total votes		36,426	100
Republican gain from Democratic			

=== Federal and statewide results ===
Year	Office	Results
2020	President	Trump 58.2 – 39.9%
2016	President	Trump 59.1 – 36.3%
2014	Senate	Capito 57.4 – 39.8%
2012	President	Romney 54.5 – 43.8%
2012	Senate	Manchin 62.1 – 33.9%
2012	Governor	Tomblin 52.2 – 42.6%
