= West Virginia's 17th Senate district =

American legislative district

West Virginia's 17th State Senate district
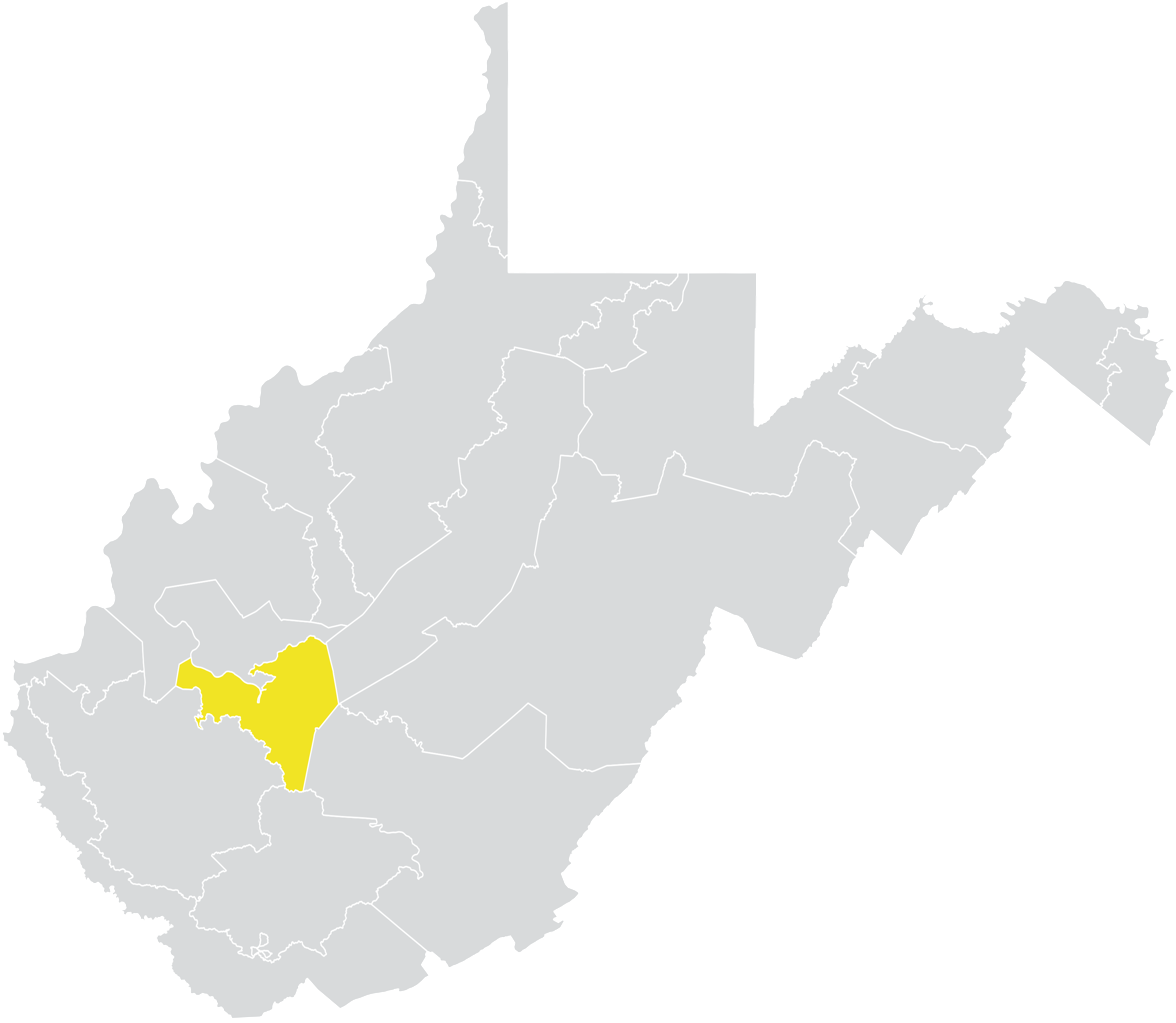
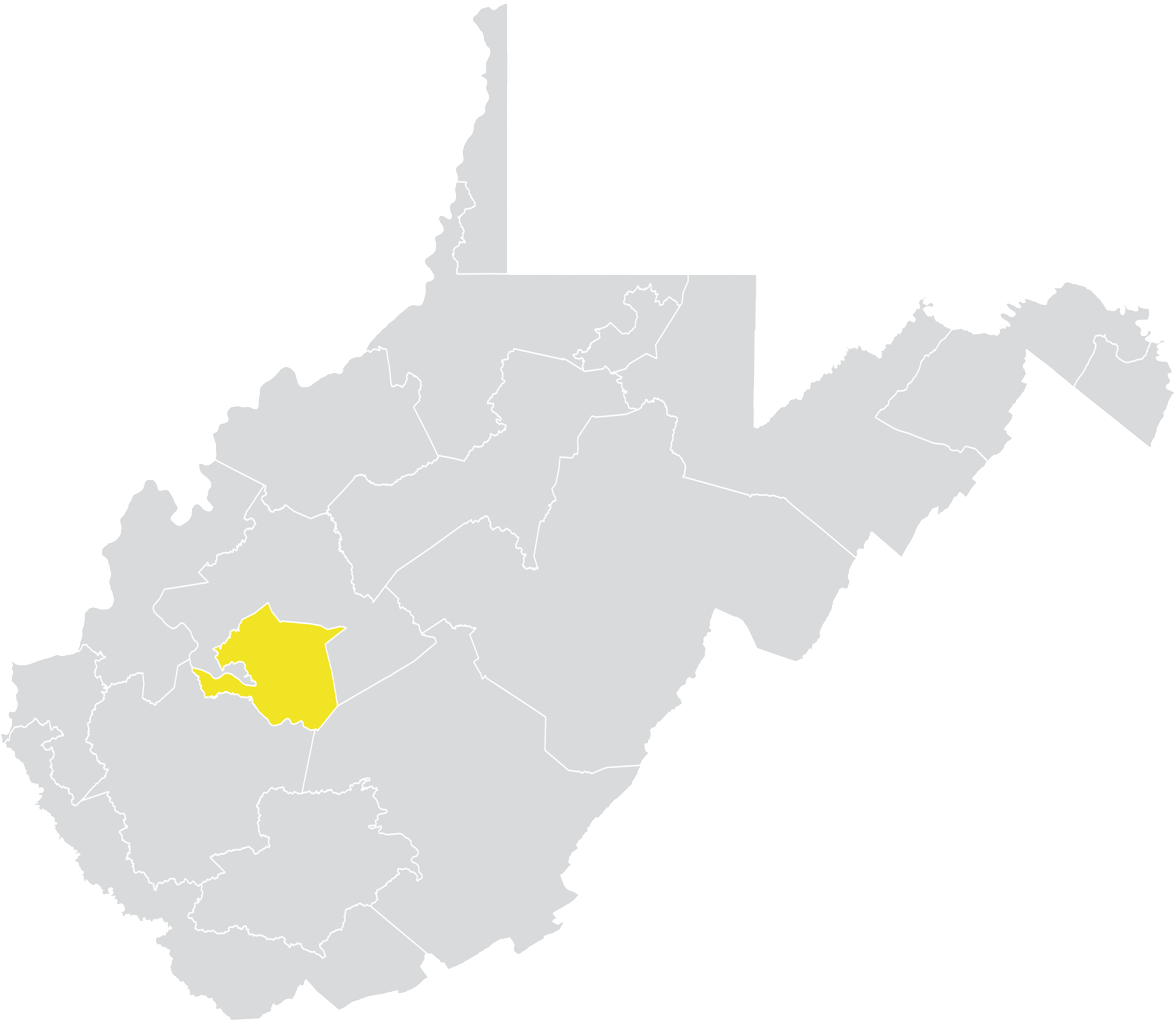
Senator
Tom Takubo; R–Charleston
Eric Nelson; R–Charleston
- Demographics: 92% White; 3% Black; 1% Hispanic; 1% Asian; 3% Other
- Population (2017): 101,817

West Virginia's 17th Senate district is one of 17 districts in the West Virginia Senate. It is currently represented by Republicans Tom Takubo and Eric Nelson. All districts in the West Virginia Senate elect two members to staggered four-year terms.

== Geography ==
District 17 covers the southern half of Kanawha County, including parts of Charleston and the nearby communities of St. Albans, Tornado, South Charleston, Coal Fork, Pinch, Elkview, Clendenin, Marmet, Belle, Chesapeake, and Cedar Grove.

The district is located entirely within West Virginia's 2nd congressional district, and overlaps with the 32nd, 35th, 36th, 39th, and 40th districts of the West Virginia House of Delegates.

== Recent election results ==
=== 2024 ===
2024 West Virginia Senate election, District 17
Primary election
Party	Candidate	Votes	%
Republican	Eric Nelson (incumbent)	6,733	57.7
Republican	Chris Pritt	4,936	42.3
Total votes		11,669	100.0
Democratic	Bil Lepp	5,770	100.0
Total votes		4,510	100.0
General election
Republican	Eric Nelson (incumbent)	26,931	64.3
Democratic	Bil Lepp	14,972	35.7
Total votes		41,903	100
Republican hold			

=== 2022 ===
2022 West Virginia Senate election, District 17
Primary election
Party	Candidate	Votes	%
Republican	Tom Takubo (incumbent)	4,226	71.1
Republican	Terry Burns	1,719	28.9
Total votes		5,945	100
General election
Republican	Tom Takubo (incumbent)	16,739	58.5
Democratic	Samuel Wood	11,897	41.5
Total votes		28,636	100

== Historical election results ==
=== 2020 ===
2020 West Virginia Senate election, District 17
Primary election
Party	Candidate	Votes	%
Democratic	Andrew Robinson	9,432	74.3
Democratic	Jon Hague	3,264	25.7
Total votes		12,696	100
General election
Republican	Eric Nelson	23,717	53.8
Democratic	Andrew Robinson	20,364	46.2
Total votes		44,081	100
Republican gain from Democratic			

=== 2018 ===
2018 West Virginia Senate election, District 17
Primary election
Party	Candidate	Votes	%
Democratic	Terrell Ellis	5,317	52.0
Democratic	Mary Ann Claytor	3,746	36.6
Democratic	Justin Salisbury	1,161	11.4
Total votes		10,224	100
General election
Republican	Tom Takubo (incumbent)	18,466	52.5
Democratic	Terrell Ellis	16,735	47.5
Total votes		35,201	100
Republican hold			

=== 2016 ===
2016 West Virginia Senate election, District 17
Party	Candidate	Votes	%
Democratic	Corey Palumbo (incumbent)	22,781	55.4
Republican	Chris Stansbury	18,345	44.6
Total votes		41,126	100
Democratic hold			

=== 2014 ===
2014 West Virginia Senate election, District 17
Primary election
Party	Candidate	Votes	%
Republican	Tom Takubo	3,477	68.2
Republican	Lance V. Wheeler	1,624	31.8
Total votes		5,101	100
General election
Republican	Tom Takubo	15,488	52.1
Democratic	Doug Skaff	13,029	43.8
Mountain	Jesse Johnson	1,221	4.1
Total votes		29,738	100
Republican gain from Democratic			

=== 2012 ===
2012 West Virginia Senate election, District 17
Primary election
Party	Candidate	Votes	%
Democratic	Corey Palumbo (incumbent)	28,384	100
Total votes		28,384	100
Democratic hold			

=== Federal and statewide results ===
Year	Office	Results
2020	President	Trump 57.3 – 40.8%
2016	President	Trump 59.1 – 36.1%
2014	Senate	Capito 58.9 – 38.5%
2012	President	Romney 56.7 – 41.6%
2012	Senate	Manchin 62.6 – 33.2%
2012	Governor	Tomblin 52.0 – 42.9%
