= West Virginia Senate =

Upper house of the West Virginia Legislature

Coordinates: 38°20′11.5″N 81°36′46.7″W

- 86th West Virginia Legislature

Type
- Type: Upper house of the West Virginia Legislature
- Term limits: None

History
- New session started: January 8, 2025

Leadership
- President: Randy Smith (R) since January 8, 2025
- President pro tempore: Jay Taylor (R) since January 14, 2026
- Majority Leader: Patrick S. Martin (R) since January 8, 2025
- Minority Leader: Mike Woelfel (D) since January 11, 2023

Structure
- Seats: 34
- Political groups: Majority Republican (32) Minority Democratic (2)
- Length of term: 4 years
- Authority: Article VI, West Virginia Constitution
- Salary: $20,000/year + per diem

Elections
- Voting system: Plurality voting in staggered elections
- Last election: November 5, 2024 (17 seats)
- Next election: November 3, 2026 (17 seats)
- Redistricting: Legislative Control

Meeting place
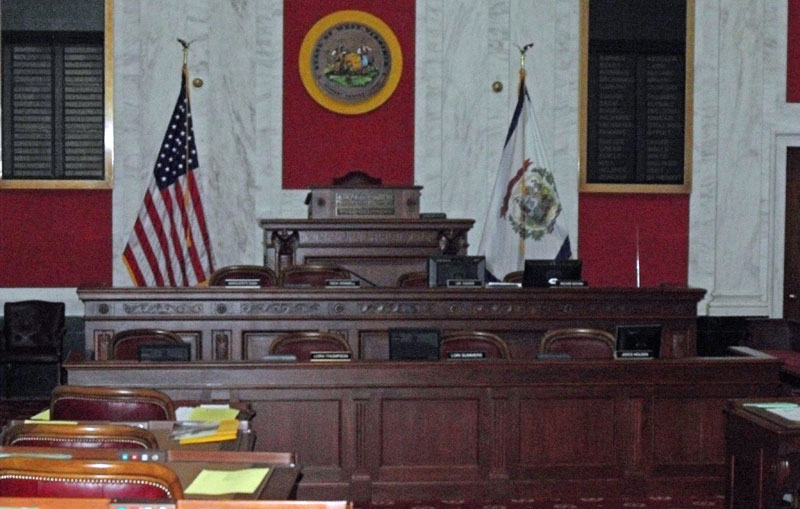
- Senate Chamber; West Virginia State Capitol; Charleston, West Virginia

Website
- West Virginia Legislature

The West Virginia Senate is the upper house of the West Virginia Legislature. There are seventeen senatorial districts. Each district has two senators who serve staggered four-year terms. Although the Democratic Party held a supermajority in the Senate as recently as 2015, Republicans now dominate in the chamber, and hold 32 seats to the Democrats' two seats.

== Organization ==
Senators are elected for terms of four years that are staggered, meaning that only a portion of the 34 state senate seats are up every election.

The state legislature meets on the second Wednesday of January each year and conducts a 60-day regular session.

== Legislative process ==
Unlike most state senates, the West Virginia Senate can introduce revenue bills. Bills must undergo three readings in each house before being sent to the governor. Bills are drafted by the Office of Legislative Services or legislative staff counsel, reviewed by the sponsor of the bill and submitted for introduction. Bills are assigned to committees that make recommendations about a bill in the form of a committee report.

Bills approved in both the West Virginia Senate and West Virginia House of Delegates are then submitted to the governor, who has the power to sign them into law or veto them. The state legislature can override the veto, unless they have already adjourned.

== Districts ==
The state is divided into 17 districts, with each electing a senator for a four-year term every two years. Thus each district contains about 1/17th of the state's population, or about 105,000 persons.

The state's districting system is unique in the United States in that both senators from a district cannot be from the same county, no matter the population of the various parts of the district. This means, for example, that one of the 5th District's two senators must reside in Cabell County and the other must reside in the portion of Wayne County that is inside the 5th District, even though Cabell County has more people than the portion of Wayne County that is part of the 5th District. However, both senators are elected by everybody within the district, not just by the people of the county in which the senators reside.

Responding to the 2010 Census the Senate redistricted itself. Kanawha County was divided for the first time in the Senate's history, with the northern and western portions joining a part of Putnam County as the 8th District and the remainder of the county constituting the 17th district on its own. This reduced the number of Senators from Kanawha County from four to three, as one of the 8th's had to be a resident of Putnam.

Responding to the 2020 Census the Senate again redistricted itself. The Senate adopted a new map, again reflecting a shift of the population to the Morgantown area and the Eastern Panhandle. Ten counties, out of the 55, were divided between two different districts, and Kanawha County was divided between three different districts.

== Senate president ==
The Senate elects its own president from its membership. Randy Smith is currently the president of the West Virginia Senate.

While the West Virginia Constitution does not create or even mention the title of lieutenant governor, West Virginia Code 6A-1-4 creates this designation for the Senate president, who stands first in the line of succession to the office of governor. As stated in Article 7 Section 16 of the constitution: "In case of the death, conviction or impeachment, failure to qualify, resignation, or other disability of the governor, the president of the Senate shall act as governor until the vacancy is filled, or the disability removed." However, the Senate President may not always serve the remainder of the term as the constitution also states: "Whenever a vacancy shall occur in the office of governor before the first three years of the term shall have expired, a new election for governor shall take place to fill the vacancy."

== Current composition ==
Map of partisan composition of legislative districts for state senate after the 2024 elections: 2 Republicans 1 Democrat and 1 Republican

=== 87th Legislature (2025–2026) ===
Affiliation	Party (Shading indicates majority caucus)		Total	Vacant
Affiliation	Republican	Democratic	Total	Vacant
Beginning of the 82nd Legislature	18	16	34	0
End of the 82nd Legislature	18	16	34	0
Beginning of the 83rd Legislature	22	12	34	0
End of the 83rd Legislature	22	12	34	0
Beginning of the 84th Legislature	20	14	34	0
End of the 84th Legislature	20	14	34	0
Beginning of the 85th Legislature	23	11	34	0
End of the 85th Legislature	23	11	34	0
Beginning of the 86th Legislature	30	4	34	0
End of the 86th Legislature	31	3	34	0
Beginning of the 87th Legislature	32	2	34	0
Latest voting share	94.1%	5.9%		

== Leadership of the 87th West Virginia Senate ==
Position	Name	Party	District	County
Senate President/Lieutenant Governor	Randy Smith	Republican	14th	Tucker
President pro tempore	Jay Taylor	Republican	14th	Taylor
Majority Leader	Patrick Martin	Republican	12th	Lewis
Minority Leader	Mike Woelfel	Democratic	5th	Cabell
Majority Whip	Ben Queen	Republican	12th	Harrison
Minority Whip	Joey Garcia	Democratic	13th	Marion

=== Committee chairs and vice chairs ===
Committee	Chair	Vice Chair
Agriculture & Natural Resources	Bill Hamilton	Vince Deeds
Banking and Insurance	Mike Azinger	Mike Oliverio
Confirmations	Donna Boley	Laura Chapman
Economic Development	Glenn Jeffries	Robbie Morris
Education	Amy Grady	Charles Clements
Energy, Industry, & Mining	Chris Rose	Ben Queen
Enrolled Bills	Jack Woodrum	Scott Fuller
Finance	Jason Barrett	Rollan Roberts
Government Organization	Patricia Rucker	Jack Woodrum
Health & Human Resources	Laura Chapman	Vince Deeds
Judiciary	Mike Stuart	Tom Willis
Military	Ryan Weld	Vince Deeds
Outdoor Recreation	Mark Maynard	Jay Taylor
Pensions	Eric Nelson	Mark Hunt
Rules	Randy Smith	Tom Takubo
School Choice	Patricia Rucker	Mark Maynard
Transportation & Infrastructure	Charles Clements	Mike Stuart
Workforce	Rollan Roberts	Glenn Jeffries

== Members of the 87th West Virginia Senate ==
District	Next Election	Name	Party	Start	Residence	Home City (Note: Multi-county districts (all but the 17th district) must elect senators from different counties.)	Counties
1	2026	Laura Chapman	Republican	2022	Wheeling	Ohio	Brooke, Hancock, Marshall, Ohio
1	2028	Ryan Weld	Republican	2016	Wellsburg	Brooke	Brooke, Hancock, Marshall, Ohio
2	2026	Charles H. Clements	Republican	2016	New Martinsville	Wetzel	Doddridge, Marion, Marshall, Monongalia, Wetzel, Tyler
2	2028	Chris Rose	Republican	2024	Maidsville	Monongalia	Doddridge, Marion, Marshall, Monongalia, Wetzel, Tyler
3	2026	Mike Azinger	Republican	2016	Vienna	Wood	Pleasants, Ritchie, Wirt, Wood
3	2026 (special)	Trenton Barnhart	Republican	2026	St. Marys	Pleasants	Pleasants, Ritchie, Wirt, Wood
4	2026	Eric Tarr	Republican	2018	Scott Depot	Putnam	Cabell, Jackson, Mason, Putnam
4	2028	Amy Grady	Republican	2020	Leon	Mason	Cabell, Jackson, Mason, Putnam
5	2026	Mike Woelfel	Democratic	2014	Huntington	Cabell	Cabell, Wayne
5	2028	Scott Fuller	Republican	2024	Kenova	Wayne	Cabell, Wayne
6	2026	Mark R. Maynard	Republican	2014	Genoa	Wayne	McDowell, Mercer, Mingo, Wayne
6	2028	Craig Hart	Republican	2024	Lenore	Mingo	McDowell, Mercer, Mingo, Wayne
7	2026	Zack Maynard	Republican	2025	Harts	Lincoln	Boone, Kanawha, Lincoln, Logan
7	2028	Rupie Phillips	Republican	2020	Lorado	Logan	Boone, Kanawha, Lincoln, Logan
8	2026	T. Kevan Bartlett	Republican	2025	Sissonville	Kanawha	Clay, Jackson, Kanawha, Putnam, Roane
8	2028	Glenn Jeffries	Republican	2016	Red House	Putnam	Clay, Jackson, Kanawha, Putnam, Roane
9	2026	Rollan Roberts	Republican	2018	Beaver	Raleigh	Fayette, Raleigh, Wyoming
9	2028	Brian Helton	Republican	2024	Mount Hope	Fayette	Fayette, Raleigh, Wyoming
10	2026	Vince Deeds	Republican	2022	Renick	Greenbrier	Fayette, Greenbrier, Monroe, Nicholas, Summers
10	2028	Jack Woodrum	Republican	2020	Hinton	Summers	Fayette, Greenbrier, Monroe, Nicholas, Summers
11	2026	Bill Hamilton	Republican	2018	Buckhannon	Upshur	Barbour, Braxton, Pendleton, Pocahontas, Randolph, Upshur, Webster
11	2028	Robbie Morris	Republican	2024	Elkins	Randolph	Barbour, Braxton, Pendleton, Pocahontas, Randolph, Upshur, Webster
12	2026	Ben Queen	Republican	2022	Bridgeport	Harrison	Calhoun, Gilmer, Harrison, Lewis, Taylor
12	2028	Patrick S. Martin	Republican	2020	Weston	Lewis	Calhoun, Gilmer, Harrison, Lewis, Taylor
13	2026	Mike Oliverio	Republican	2022 (Note: Oliverio previously served in the Senate from 1994 to 2010.)	Morgantown	Monongalia	Marion, Monongalia
13	2028	Joey Garcia	Democratic	2024	Fairmont	Marion	Marion, Monongalia
14	2026	Jay Taylor	Republican	2022	Grafton	Taylor	Grant, Hardy, Mineral, Preston, Taylor, Tucker
14	2028	Randy Smith	Republican	2016	Thomas	Tucker	Grant, Hardy, Mineral, Preston, Taylor, Tucker
15	2026	Darren Thorne	Republican	2024	Romney	Hampshire	Berkeley, Hampshire, Morgan
15	2028	Tom Willis	Republican	2024	Martinsburg	Berkeley	Berkeley, Hampshire, Morgan
16	2026	Jason Barrett	Republican	2022	Martinsburg	Berkeley	Berkeley, Jefferson
16	2028	Patricia Rucker	Republican	2016	Harpers Ferry	Jefferson	Berkeley, Jefferson
17	2026	Tom Takubo	Republican	2014	Charleston	Kanawha	Kanawha
17	2026 (special)	Anne Charnock	Republican	2025	Charleston	Kanawha	Kanawha

== See also ==
- List of presidents of the West Virginia Senate
- List of West Virginia Senate districts
- List of West Virginia state legislatures
