= 77th West Virginia Senate =

== Composition ==
2005-2007:

Affiliation	Members
Democratic Party	21 (62%)
Republican Party	13 (38%)
Total	34
Government Majority	8

2007-2009:

Affiliation	Members
Democratic Party	23 (68%)
Republican Party	11 (32%)
Total	34
Government Majority	12

== Floor Leadership ==
- Majority Leader: H. Truman Chafin
- Majority Whip: Billy Wayne Bailey
- Minority Leader: Vic Sprouse
- Minority Whip: Andy McKenzie

== Committees ==
At the start each new Legislature, standing committees are appointed. The Senate President selects the chairpersons. The Rules of the Senate call for the following committees to be formed:

- Agriculture (11 members) - Larry J. Edgell, Chairman
- Banking and Insurance (14 members) - Joseph M. Minard, Chairman
- Confirmations (9 members) - Shirley Love, Chairman
- Economic Development (14 members) - Brooks McCabe, Chairman
- Education (14 members) - Robert H. Plymale, Chairman
- Energy, Industry and Mining (14 members) - William R. Sharpe, Jr., Chairman
- Finance (17 members) - Walt Helmick, Chairman
- Government Organization (14 members) - Edwin Bowman, Chairman
- Health and Human Resources (14 members) - Roman W. Prezioso, Jr., Chairman
- Interstate Cooperation (7 members) - Evan H. Jenkins, chairman; (Senate President is ex officio co-chairperson)
- Judiciary (17 members) - Jeffrey V. Kessler, Chairman
- Labor (11 members) - Michael Oliverio II, Chairman
- Military (9 members) - Jon Blair Hunter, Chairman
- Natural Resources (14 members) - John Pat Fanning, Chairman
- Pensions (7 members) - Dan Foster, Chairman
- Rules (11 members) - Earl Ray Tomblin, Ex officio Chairman as Senate President
- Transportation and Infrastructure (9 members) - John Unger II, Chairman
