= List of members of the 77th West Virginia Senate =

List of members of the Senate for the 77th West Virginia Legislature

== Leadership of the 77th West Virginia Senate ==
Position	Name	Party	District	County
President of the Senate/Lieutenant Governor	Earl Ray Tomblin	Democratic	7	Logan Co.
President Pro Tempore	William R. Sharpe, Jr.	Democratic	12	Lewis Co.
Majority Leader	H. Truman Chafin	Democratic	6	Mingo Co.
Minority Leader	Donald T. Caruth	Republican	10	Mercer Co.
Majority Whip	Billy Wayne Bailey	Democratic	9	Wyoming Co.
Minority Whip	Andy McKenzie	Republican	1	Ohio Co.

== List of Members of the 77th West Virginia Senate by District ==
District	Senator	Party	County(ies)
1	Edwin Bowman	Democratic	Brooke, Hancock, Ohio
1	Andy McKenzie	Republican	Brooke, Hancock, Ohio
2	Larry J. Edgell	Democratic	Calhoun, Doddridge, Marion (part), Marshall, Monongalia (part), Ritchie, Tyler, Wetzel
2	Jeffrey V. Kessler	Democratic	Calhoun, Doddridge, Marion (part), Marshall, Monongalia (part), Ritchie, Tyler, Wetzel
3	Donna J. Boley	Republican	Pleasants, Roane (part), Wirt, Wood
3	Frank Deem	Republican	Pleasants, Roane (part), Wirt, Wood
4	Karen L. Facemyer	Republican	Jackson, Mason, Putnam, Roane (part)
4	Charles C. Lanham	Republican	Jackson, Mason, Putnam, Roane (part)
5	Evan Jenkins	Democratic	Cabell, Wayne (part)
5	Robert H. Plymale	Democratic	Cabell, Wayne (part)
6	H. Truman Chafin	Democratic	McDowell, Mercer (part), Mingo (part), Wayne (part)
6	John Pat Fanning	Democratic	McDowell, Mercer (part), Mingo (part), Wayne (part)
7	Ron Stollings	Democratic	Boone, Lincoln, Logan, Wayne (part)
7	Earl Ray Tomblin	Democratic	Boone, Lincoln, Logan, Wayne (part)
8	Vic Sprouse	Republican	Kanawha (part)
8	Erik Wells	Democratic	Kanawha (part)
9	Billy Wayne Bailey	Democratic	Raleigh, Wyoming (part)
9	Mike Green	Democratic	Raleigh, Wyoming (part)
10	Don Caruth	Republican	Fayette (part), Greenbrier, Mercer, Monroe, Summers
10	Jesse O. Guills	Republican	Fayette (part), Greenbrier, Mercer, Monroe, Summers
11	Shirley Love	Democratic	Fayette (part), Clay, Nicholas, Upshur, Webster
11	Randy White	Democratic	Fayette (part), Clay, Nicholas, Upshur, Webster
12	Joseph M. Minard	Democratic	Braxton, Gilmer, Harrison, Lewis
12	William R. Sharpe, Jr.	Democratic	Braxton, Gilmer, Harrison, Lewis
13	Michael Oliverio II	Democratic	Marion (part), Monongalia (part)
13	Roman W. Prezioso, Jr.	Democratic	Marion (part), Monongalia (part)
14	Jon Blair Hunter	Democratic	Barbour, Grant (part), Mineral (part), Monongalia (part), Preston, Taylor
14	David Sypolt	Republican	Barbour, Grant (part), Mineral (part), Monongalia (part), Preston, Taylor
15	Clark S. Barnes	Republican	Berkeley, Grant (part), Hardy, Hampshire, Pendleton, Pocahontas, Randolph, Upshur (part)
15	Walt Helmick	Democratic	Berkeley, Grant (part), Hardy, Hampshire, Pendleton, Pocahontas, Randolph, Upshur (part)
16	John Unger	Democratic	Berkeley (part), Jefferson
16	John C. Yoder	Republican	Berkeley (part), Jefferson
17	Dan Foster	Democratic	Kanawha (part)
17	Brooks McCabe	Democratic	Kanawha (part)

== See also ==
- West Virginia Senate
- List of members of the 78th West Virginia Senate
