= List of members of the 80th West Virginia Senate =

This is a list of members of the 80th West Virginia Senate. It contains members of the West Virginia Senate for the 80th West Virginia Legislature, which convened in January 2011.

== Leadership of the 80th West Virginia Senate ==
Position	Name	Party	District	County
President of the Senate/Lieutenant Governor	Jeffrey V. Kessler	Democratic	2	Marshall Co.
President Pro Tempore	Joseph M. Minard	Democratic	12	Harrison Co.
Majority Leader	John Unger	Democratic	16	Berkeley Co.
Minority Leader	Mike Hall	Republican	4	Putnam Co.
Majority Whip	Richard Browning	Democratic	9	Wyoming Co.
Minority Whip	Karen L. Facemyer	Republican	4	Jackson Co.

== Members of the 80th West Virginia Senate, by District ==
District	Senator	Party	Residence	District County/Counties
1	Robert J. "Rocky" Fitzsimmons	Democratic	Ohio	Brooke, Hancock, Ohio (part)
1	Jack Yost	Democratic	Brooke	Brooke, Hancock, Ohio (part)
2	Larry J. Edgell	Democratic	Wetzel	Calhoun, Doddridge, Marion (part), Marshall, Monongalia (part), Ohio (part), Ritchie, Tyler, Wetzel
2	Jeffrey V. Kessler	Democratic	Marshall	Calhoun, Doddridge, Marion (part), Marshall, Monongalia (part), Ohio (part), Ritchie, Tyler, Wetzel
3	Donna J. Boley	Republican	Pleasants	Pleasants, Roane (part), Wirt, Wood
3	David Nohe	Republican	Wood	Pleasants, Roane (part), Wirt, Wood
4	Karen L. Facemyer	Republican	Jackson	Jackson, Mason, Putnam, Roane (part)
4	Mike Hall	Republican	Putnam	Jackson, Mason, Putnam, Roane (part)
5	Evan Jenkins	Democratic	Raleigh	Cabell, Wayne (part)
5	Robert H. Plymale	Democratic	Wayne	Cabell, Wayne (part)
6	H. Truman Chafin	Democratic	Mingo	McDowell, Mercer (part), Mingo (part), Wayne (part)
6	John Pat Fanning	Democratic	McDowell	McDowell, Mercer (part), Mingo (part), Wayne (part)
7	Ron Stollings	Democratic	Boone	Boone, Lincoln, Logan, Wayne (part)
7	Art Kirkendoll	Democratic	Logan	Boone, Lincoln, Logan, Wayne (part)
8	Corey Palumbo	Democratic	Kanawha	Kanawha
8	Erik Wells	Democratic	Kanawha	Kanawha
9	Richard Browning	Democratic	Wyoming	Raleigh, Wyoming (part)
9	Mike Green	Democratic	Raleigh	Raleigh, Wyoming (part)
10	Ron Miller	Democratic	Greenbrier	Fayette (part), Greenbrier, Mercer, Monroe, Summers
10	Mark Wills	Democratic	Mercer	Fayette (part), Greenbrier, Mercer, Monroe, Summers
11	William R. Laird, IV	Democratic	Fayette	Fayette (part), Clay, Nicholas, Upshur, Webster
11	Gregory Tucker	Democratic	Nicholas	Fayette (part), Clay, Nicholas, Upshur, Webster
12	Douglas E. Facemire	Democratic	Braxton	Braxton, Gilmer, Harrison, Lewis
12	Joseph M. Minard	Democratic	Harrison	Braxton, Gilmer, Harrison, Lewis
13	Bob Beach	Democratic	Monongalia	Marion (part), Monongalia (part)
13	Roman W. Prezioso, Jr.	Democratic	Marion	Marion (part), Monongalia (part)
14	David Sypolt	Republican	Preston	Barbour, Grant (part), Mineral (part), Monongalia (part), Preston, Taylor
14	Bob Williams	Democratic	Taylor	Barbour, Grant (part), Mineral (part), Monongalia (part), Preston, Taylor
15	Clark S. Barnes	Republican	Randolph	Berkeley, Grant (part), Hardy, Hampshire, Pendleton, Pocahontas, Randolph, Upshur (part)
15	Walt Helmick	Democratic	Pocahontas	Berkeley, Grant (part), Hardy, Hampshire, Pendleton, Pocahontas, Randolph, Upshur (part)
16	Herb Snyder	Democratic	Jefferson	Berkeley (part), Jefferson
16	John Unger	Democratic	Berkeley	Berkeley (part), Jefferson
17	Dan Foster	Democratic	Kanawha	Kanawha
17	Brooks McCabe	Democratic	Kanawha	Kanawha

== See also ==
- West Virginia Senate
  - List of presidents of the West Virginia Senate
  - List of members of the 79th West Virginia Senate
  - List of members of the 78th West Virginia Senate
  - List of members of the 77th West Virginia Senate
- West Virginia House of Delegates
  - List of speakers of the West Virginia House of Delegates
  - List of members of the 79th West Virginia House of Delegates
  - List of members of the 78th West Virginia House of Delegates
  - List of members of the 77th West Virginia House of Delegates
