= List of West Virginia state legislatures =

The legislature of the U.S. state of West Virginia has convened many times since statehood became effective on June 20, 1863.

== Legislatures ==
Number	Start date	End date	Last election
West Virginia Constitution of 1863
1st West Virginia legislature	1863		
2nd West Virginia legislature	1864		
3rd West Virginia legislature	1865		
4th West Virginia legislature	1866		
5th West Virginia legislature	1867		
6th West Virginia legislature	1868		
7th West Virginia legislature	1869		
8th West Virginia legislature	1870		
9th West Virginia legislature	1871		
10th West Virginia legislature	January 16, 1872	February 29, 1872	
West Virginia Constitution of 1872
11th West Virginia legislature	November 19, 1872	December 1873	
12th West Virginia legislature	1875		
13th West Virginia legislature	1877		
14th West Virginia legislature	1879		
15th West Virginia legislature	1881		
16th West Virginia legislature	1883		
17th West Virginia legislature	1885		
18th West Virginia legislature	1887		
19th West Virginia legislature	1889		
20th West Virginia legislature	1891		
21st West Virginia legislature	1893		
22nd West Virginia legislature	1895		
23rd West Virginia legislature	1897		
24th West Virginia legislature	1899		
25th West Virginia legislature	1901		
26th West Virginia legislature	1903		
27th West Virginia legislature	1905		
28th West Virginia legislature	1907		
29th West Virginia legislature	1909		
30th West Virginia legislature	1911		
31st West Virginia legislature	1913		
32nd West Virginia legislature	1915		
33rd West Virginia legislature	1917		
34th West Virginia legislature	1919		
35th West Virginia legislature	1921		
36th West Virginia legislature	1923		
37th West Virginia legislature	1925		
38th West Virginia legislature	1927		
39th West Virginia legislature	1929		
40th West Virginia legislature	1931		
41st West Virginia legislature	1933		
42nd West Virginia legislature	1935		
43rd West Virginia legislature	1937		
44th West Virginia legislature	1939		
45th West Virginia legislature	1941		
46th West Virginia legislature	1942		
47th West Virginia legislature	1944		
48th West Virginia legislature	1947		
49th West Virginia legislature	1949		
50th West Virginia legislature	1951		
51st West Virginia legislature	1953		
52nd West Virginia legislature	1955		
53rd West Virginia legislature	1957		
54th West Virginia legislature	1959		
55th West Virginia legislature	1961		
56th West Virginia legislature	1963		
57th West Virginia legislature	1965		
58th West Virginia legislature	1967		
59th West Virginia legislature	1969		
60th West Virginia legislature	1971		
61st West Virginia legislature	1973		
62nd West Virginia legislature	1975		
63rd West Virginia legislature	1977		
64th West Virginia legislature	1979		
65th West Virginia legislature	1981		
66th West Virginia legislature	1983		
67th West Virginia legislature	1985		
68th West Virginia legislature	1987		
69th West Virginia legislature	1989		
70th West Virginia legislature	1991		
71st West Virginia legislature	1993		
72nd West Virginia legislature	1995		
73rd West Virginia legislature	1997		
74th West Virginia legislature	1999		November 1998: Senate
75th West Virginia legislature	2001		November 2000: Senate
76th West Virginia legislature	2003		
77th West Virginia legislature members of House, Senate	2005		November 2004: Senate
78th West Virginia legislature members of House, Senate	2007		November 2006: Senate
79th West Virginia legislature members of House, Senate	2009		November 2008: Senate
80th West Virginia legislature members of House, Senate	2011		November 2, 2010: Senate
81st West Virginia legislature	2013		November 6, 2012: Senate
82nd West Virginia legislature	January 14, 2015		November 4, 2014: Senate
83rd West Virginia legislature	2017		November 8, 2016: Senate
84th West Virginia legislature	2019		November 6, 2018: House, Senate
85th West Virginia legislature members	2021		November 3, 2020: House, Senate
86th West Virginia legislature members	2023		November 8, 2022: House, Senate
87th West Virginia legislature members	2025		November 5, 2024: House, Senate

== See also ==
- List of speakers of the West Virginia House of Delegates
- List of presidents of the West Virginia Senate
- List of governors of West Virginia
- Politics of West Virginia
- Elections in West Virginia
- West Virginia State Capitol
- Historical outline of West Virginia
- Lists of United States state legislative sessions
