= 1996 West Virginia Senate election =

- November 5, 1996

17 out of 34 seats in the West Virginia Senate 18 seats needed for a majority
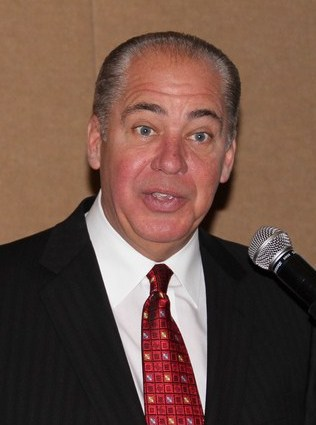

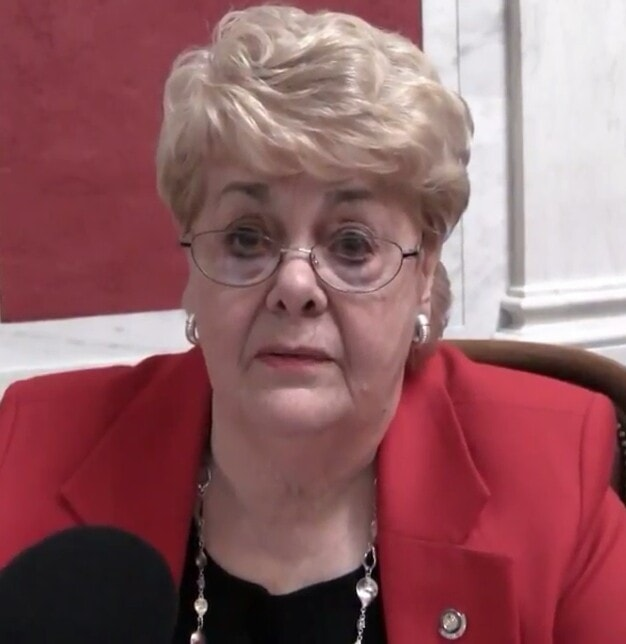
	Majority party	Minority party
Leader	Earl Ray Tomblin	Donna Boley
Party	Democratic	Republican
Leader since	January 3, 1995	January 9, 1991
Leader's seat	District 7	District 3
Last election	26	8
Seats after	25	9
Seat change	▼1	▲1
Popular vote	365,723	178,877
Percentage	67.15%	32.85%
President before election
Earl Ray Tomblin
Democratic
Elected President
Earl Ray Tomblin
Democratic

The 1996 West Virginia Senate election was held on November 5, 1996, to determine which party would control the West Virginia Senate for the following two years in the 73rd West Virginia legislature. Half out of the 34 seats in the West Virginia Senate were up for election. Prior to the election, 26 seats were held by Democrats and 8 seats were held by Republicans. The general election saw Republicans flip a single seat, meaning that Democrats retained their majority in the State Senate.

== Retirements ==
=== Democrats ===
1. District 6: A. Keith Wagner retired.
2. District 10: Tony E. Whitlow retired.
3. District 13: Joe Manchin retired.
4. District 14: Charles B. Felton Jr. retired.

=== Republicans ===
1. District 16: John C. Yoder retired.

== Defeated incumbents ==
=== In general ===
==== Democrats ====
1. District 1: Thais Blatnik lost re-election to Andy McKenzie.
2. District 8: David Grubb lost re-election to Vic Sprouse.

== Closest races ==
Seats where the margin of victory was under 10%:

1. District 4, 2.04%
2. District 8, 2.98% (gain)
3. District 1, 6.96% (gain)

== Results ==
=== District 1 ===
District 1 election, 1996
Party	Candidate	Votes	%
Republican	Andy McKenzie	19,158	53.48%
Democratic	Thais Blatnik (incumbent)	16,666	46.52%
Total votes		35,824	100.0%
Republican gain from Democratic			

=== District 2 ===
District 2 election, 1996
Party	Candidate	Votes	%
Democratic	Larry Wiedebusch (incumbent)	18,285	57.19%
Republican	Donald A. Haskins	13,685	42.81%
Total votes		31,970	100.0%
Democratic hold			

=== District 3 ===
District 3 election, 1996
Party	Candidate	Votes	%
Republican	Donna Boley (incumbent)	26,632	70.62%
Democratic	Louis F. Flade	11,079	29.38%
Total votes		37,711	100.0%
Republican hold			

=== District 4 ===
District 4 election, 1996
Party	Candidate	Votes	%
Democratic	Robert Dittmar (incumbent)	20,861	51.02%
Republican	Bobby Brown	20,024	48.98%
Total votes		40,885	100.0%
Democratic hold			

=== District 5 ===
District 5 election, 1996
Party	Candidate	Votes	%
Democratic	Robert H. Plymale (incumbent)	21,023	100.0%
Total votes		21,023	100.0%
Democratic hold			

=== District 6 ===
District 6 election, 1996
Party	Candidate	Votes	%
Democratic	John Pat Fanning	20,192	100.0%
Total votes		20,192	100.0%
Democratic hold			

=== District 7 ===
District 7 election, 1996
Party	Candidate	Votes	%
Democratic	Earl Ray Tomblin (incumbent)	25,396	81.45%
Republican	Stephen Ray Smith	5,783	18.55%
Total votes		31,179	100.0%
Democratic hold			

=== District 8 ===
District 8 election, 1996
Party	Candidate	Votes	%
Republican	Vic Sprouse	36,042	51.49%
Democratic	David Grubb (incumbent)	33,957	48.51%
Total votes		69,999	100.0%
Republican gain from Democratic			

=== District 9 ===
District 9 election, 1996
Party	Candidate	Votes	%
Democratic	Billy Wayne Bailey (incumbent)	20,795	83.59%
Republican	R. Joseph Whelan	4,081	16.41%
Total votes		24,876	100.0%
Democratic hold			

=== District 10 ===
District 10 election, 1996
Party	Candidate	Votes	%
Democratic	Homer K. Ball	23,754	100.0%
Total votes		23,754	100.0%
Democratic hold			

=== District 11 ===
District 11 election, 1996
Party	Candidate	Votes	%
Democratic	Shirley Love (incumbent)	24,769	72.36%
Republican	Jim Gilkeson	9,462	27.64%
Total votes		34,231	100.0%
Democratic hold			

=== District 12 ===
District 12 election, 1996
Party	Candidate	Votes	%
Democratic	William R. Sharpe Jr. (incumbent)	25,767	66.87%
Republican	David Craft	12,765	33.13%
Total votes		38,532	100.0%
Democratic hold			

=== District 13 ===
District 13 election, 1996
Party	Candidate	Votes	%
Democratic	Roman Prezioso	30,773	100.0%
Total votes		30,773	100.0%
Democratic hold			

=== District 14 ===
District 14 election, 1996
Party	Candidate	Votes	%
Democratic	Jon Blair Hunter	21,195	57.36%
Republican	Thomas H. Hudgins Jr.	15,753	42.64%
Total votes		36,948	100.0%
Democratic hold			

=== District 15 ===
District 15 election, 1996
Party	Candidate	Votes	%
Democratic	Mike Ross (incumbent)	27,314	100.0%
Total votes		27,314	100.0%
Democratic hold			

=== District 16 ===
District 16 election, 1996
Party	Candidate	Votes	%
Democratic	Herb Snyder	19,277	55.44%
Republican	Mel Bowers Jr.	15,492	44.56%
Total votes		34,769	100.0%
Democratic gain from Republican			

=== District 17 ===
District 17 election, 1996
Party	Candidate	Votes	%
Democratic	Martha Yeager Walker (incumbent)	46,201	100.0%
Total votes		46,201	100.0%
Democratic hold			
