= 2004 West Virginia Senate election =

2004 West Virginia Senate elections
- November 2, 2004

17 of 34 seats in the West Virginia Senate 18 seats needed for a majority
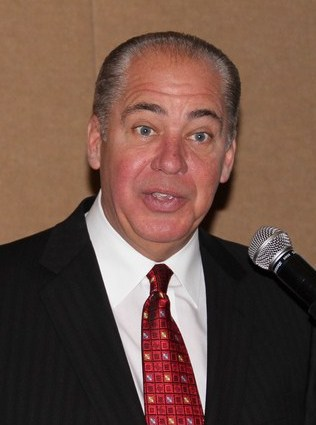

	Majority party	Minority party
Leader	Earl Ray Tomblin	Vic Sprouse
Party	Democratic	Republican
Leader since	1995	1998
Leader's seat	SD 7	SD 8
Seats before	24	10
Seats after	21	13
Seat change	▼3	▲3
Popular vote	418,869	373,728
Percentage	52.7%	47.0%
Seats up	13	4
Seats won	10	7

Holds and gains:
Democratic hold
Republican gain Republican hold
Democratic
50–60%
60–70%
70–80%
Republican
50–60%
>90%
Senate President before election
Earl Ray Tomblin
Democratic
Elected Senate President
Earl Ray Tomblin
Democratic

The 2004 West Virginia Senate election took place on Tuesday, November 2, 2004, to elect members to the 77th and 78th Legislatures; held concurrently with the presidential, U.S. House, and gubernatorial elections. State senate seats in West Virginia are staggered, with senators serving 4-year terms. 17 of the 34 state senate seats were up for election. While Republican candidate for George W. Bush won the state in the presidential election by 13 points, the Democratic Party won a majority of the vote for state senate candidates. Republicans managed to flip 3 seats, chipping away at the Democrats' supermajority.

== Predictions ==
Source	Ranking	As of
Rothenberg	Safe D	October 1, 2004

== Summary ==
Summary of the 2004 West Virginia Senate election results
Party	Candidates	Votes	%	Seats				
Party	Candidates	Votes	%	Before	Up	Won	After	+/–
Democratic	16	418,869	52.7	24	13	10	21	▼3
Republican	17	373,728	47.0	10	4	7	13	▲3
Mountain	1	2,048	0.3	0	0	0	0	Steady
Write-in	1	5	nil	0	0	0	0	Steady
Total		794,650	100%	34	17		34	Steady

Popular vote
Democratic	52.7%
Republican	47.0%
Mountain	0.3%
Write-in	nil%

Seats won
Democratic	58.8%
Republican	41.2%

Total senate seats
Democratic	61.8%
Republican	38.2%

== SD 1 ==
2004 West Virginia SD 1 general election
Party	Candidate	Votes	%
Republican	Andy McKenzie (incumbent)	22,089	53.4
Democratic	Tal Hutchins	19,249	46.6
Total votes		41,338	100.0
Republican hold			

== SD 2 ==
2004 West Virginia SD 2 general election
Party	Candidate	Votes	%
Democratic	Jeffrey V. Kessler (incumbent)	27,822	67.4
Republican	Russ Snyder	13,455	32.6
Total votes		41,277	100.0
Democratic hold			

== SD 3 ==
2004 West Virginia SD 3 general election
Party	Candidate	Votes	%
Republican	Donna J. Boley (incumbent)	37,788	100.0
Total votes		37,788	100.0
Republican hold			

== SD 4 ==
2004 West Virginia SD 4 general election
Party	Candidate	Votes	%
Republican	Karen Facemyer (incumbent)	29,321	57.7
Democratic	David Mullins	21,466	42.3
Total votes		50,787	100.0
Republican hold			

== SD 5 ==
2004 West Virginia SD 5 general election
Party	Candidate	Votes	%
Democratic	Robert H. Plymale (incumbent)	24,268	61.8
Republican	Stephen Hall	15,006	38.2
Total votes		39,274	100.0
Democratic hold			

== SD 6 ==
2004 West Virginia SD 6 general election
Party	Candidate	Votes	%
Democratic	John Pat Fanning (incumbent)	22,232	72.2
Republican	Jacob Potter	8,557	27.8
Total votes		30,789	100.0
Democratic hold			

== SD 7 ==
2004 West Virginia SD 7 general election
Party	Candidate	Votes	%
Democratic	Earl Ray Tomblin (incumbent)	27,147	74.5
Republican	Billy Marcum	9,300	25.5
Total votes		36,447	100.0
Democratic hold			

== SD 8 ==
2004 West Virginia SD 8 general election
Party	Candidate	Votes	%
Republican	Vic Sprouse (incumbent)	48,762	56.4
Democratic	Margaret Workman	37,709	43.6
Total votes		86,471	100.0
Republican hold			

== SD 9 ==
2004 West Virginia SD 9 general election
Party	Candidate	Votes	%
Democratic	Billy Wayne Bailey (incumbent)	20,430	56.6
Republican	Jack Fincham	16,285	44.4
Total votes		36,715	100.0
Democratic hold			

== SD 10 ==
2004 West Virginia SD 10 general election
Party	Candidate	Votes	%
Republican	Donald Caruth	20,714	51.0
Democratic	Anita Caldwell (incumbent)	19,942	49.0
Total votes		40,656	100.0
Republican gain from Democratic			

== SD 11 ==
2004 West Virginia SD 11 general election
Party	Candidate	Votes	%
Democratic	Shirley Love (incumbent)	26,659	64.7
Republican	Robert Johnson	14,549	35.3
Total votes		41,208	100.0
Democratic hold			

== SD 12 ==
2004 West Virginia SD 12 general election
Party	Candidate	Votes	%
Democratic	William R. Sharpe Jr. (incumbent)	28,603	65.2
Republican	Stephen Weaver	13,207	30.1
Mountain	John Williams	2,048	4.7
Total votes		43,858	100.0
Democratic hold			

== SD 13 ==
2004 West Virginia SD 13 general election
Party	Candidate	Votes	%
Democratic	Roman W. Prezioso, Jr. (incumbent)	30,777	68.3
Republican	Mark Reynolds	14,301	31.7
Total votes		45,078	100.0
Democratic hold			

== SD 14 ==
2004 West Virginia SD 14 general election
Party	Candidate	Votes	%
Democratic	Jon Blair Hunter (incumbent)	23,154	51.0
Republican	David Sypolt	22,210	49.0
Write-in	John Bartlett	5	nil
Total votes		45,369	100.0
Democratic hold			

== SD 15 ==
2004 West Virginia SD 15 general election
Party	Candidate	Votes	%
Republican	Clark Barnes	22,000	50.4
Democratic	Mike Ross (incumbent)	21,669	49.6
Total votes		43,669	100.0
Republican gain from Democratic			

== SD 16 ==
2004 West Virginia SD 16 general election
Party	Candidate	Votes	%
Republican	John Yoder	28,480	57.8
Democratic	Gregory Lance	20,748	42.2
Total votes		49,228	100.0
Republican gain from Democratic			

== SD 17 ==
2004 West Virginia SD 17 general election
Party	Candidate	Votes	%
Democratic	Dan Foster	46,994	55.5
Republican	Rusty Webb	37,704	44.5
Total votes		84,698	100.0
Democratic hold			
