= List of members of the 79th West Virginia Senate =

This List of members of the Senate for the 79th West Virginia Legislature is current as of May 2010.

== Leadership of the 79th West Virginia Senate ==
Position	Name	Party	District	County
President of the Senate(de jure)/Governor(since November 15, 2010)	Earl Ray Tomblin	Democratic	7	Logan Co.
President Pro Tempore (de facto Senate President since November 15, 2010)	Joseph M. Minard	Democratic	12	Harrison Co.
Majority Leader	H. Truman Chafin	Democratic	6	Mingo Co.
Minority Leader	Mike Hall	Republican	4	Putnam Co.
Majority Whip	Larry J. Edgell	Democratic	2	Marshall Co.
Minority Whip	Clark S. Barnes	Republican	15	Randolph Co.

== Members of the 79th West Virginia Senate ==
District	Senator	Party	County(ies)
1	Edwin Bowman	Democratic	Brooke, Hancock, Ohio
1	Jack Yost	Democratic	Brooke, Hancock, Ohio
2	Larry J. Edgell	Democratic	Calhoun, Doddridge, Marion (part), Marshall, Monongalia (part), Ritchie, Tyler, Wetzel
2	Jeffrey V. Kessler	Democratic	Calhoun, Doddridge, Marion (part), Marshall, Monongalia (part), Ritchie, Tyler, Wetzel
3	Donna J. Boley	Republican	Pleasants, Roane (part), Wirt, Wood
3	Frank Deem	Republican	Pleasants, Roane (part), Wirt, Wood
4	Karen L. Facemyer	Republican	Jackson, Mason, Putnam, Roane (part)
4	Mike Hall	Republican	Jackson, Mason, Putnam, Roane (part)
5	Evan Jenkins	Democratic	Cabell, Wayne (part)
5	Robert H. Plymale	Democratic	Cabell, Wayne (part)
6	H. Truman Chafin	Democratic	McDowell, Mercer (part), Mingo (part), Wayne (part)
6	John Pat Fanning	Democratic	McDowell, Mercer (part), Mingo (part), Wayne (part)
7	Ron Stollings	Democratic	Boone, Lincoln, Logan, Wayne (part)
7	Earl Ray Tomblin	Democratic	Boone, Lincoln, Logan, Wayne (part)
8/17	Dan Foster	Democratic	Kanawha
8/17	Brooks McCabe	Democratic	Kanawha
8/17	Corey Palumbo	Democratic	Kanawha
8/17	Erik Wells	Democratic	Kanawha
9	Richard Browning	Democratic	Raleigh, Wyoming (part)
9	Mike Green	Democratic	Raleigh, Wyoming (part)
10	John Shott	Republican	Fayette (part), Greenbrier, Mercer, Monroe, Summers
10	Jesse O. Guills	Republican	Fayette (part), Greenbrier, Mercer, Monroe, Summers
11	William R. Laird, IV	Democratic	Fayette (part), Clay, Nicholas, Upshur, Webster
11	Randy White	Democratic	Fayette (part), Clay, Nicholas, Upshur, Webster
12	Douglas E. Facemire	Democratic	Braxton, Gilmer, Harrison, Lewis
12	Joseph M. Minard	Democratic	Braxton, Gilmer, Harrison, Lewis
13	Michael Oliverio II	Democratic	Marion (part), Monongalia (part)
13	Roman W. Prezioso, Jr.	Democratic	Marion (part), Monongalia (part)
14	David Sypolt	Republican	Barbour, Grant (part), Mineral (part), Monongalia (part), Preston, Taylor
14	Bob Williams	Democratic	Barbour, Grant (part), Mineral (part), Monongalia (part), Preston, Taylor
15	Clark S. Barnes	Republican	Berkeley, Grant (part), Hardy, Hampshire, Pendleton, Pocahontas, Randolph, Upshur (part)
15	Walt Helmick	Democratic	Berkeley, Grant (part), Hardy, Hampshire, Pendleton, Pocahontas, Randolph, Upshur (part)
16	Herb Snyder	Democratic	Berkeley (part), Jefferson
16	John Unger	Democratic	Berkeley (part), Jefferson

== Composition of the 79th West Virginia Senate ==
2009–2011:

Affiliation	Members
Democratic Party	26 (76%)
Republican Party	8 (24%)
Total	34
Majority	18

== See also ==
- West Virginia Senate
- List of presidents of the West Virginia Senate
- List of members of the 78th West Virginia Senate
