= 2000 West Virginia Senate election =

2000 West Virginia Senate elections
- November 7, 2000

18 of 34 seats in the West Virginia Senate (17 regular, 1 special) 18 seats needed for a majority
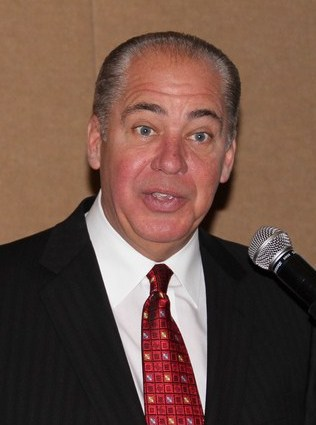

| | Majority party | Minority party |
|---|---|---|
| Leader | Earl Ray Tomblin | Vic Sprouse |
| Party | Democratic | Republican |
| Leader since | 1995 | 1998 |
| Leader's seat | SD 7 | SD 8 |
| Seats before | 29 | 5 |
| Seats after | 28 | 6 |
| Seat change | ▼1 | ▲1 |
| Popular vote | 484,336 | 200,791 |
| Percentage | 70.4% | 29.3% |
| Seats up | 15 | 3 |
| Seats won | 14 | 4 |

Circular inset (SD 11): Special election
Democratic hold
Republican gain Republican hold
Democratic
50–60%
60–70%
70–80%
>90%
Republican
50–60%
70–80%
Senate President before election
Earl Ray Tomblin
Democratic
Elected Senate President
Earl Ray Tomblin
Democratic

The 2000 West Virginia Senate election took place on Tuesday, November 7, 2000. State senate seats in West Virginia are staggered, with senators serving 4-year terms. 18 of the 34 state senate seats were up for election, with 17 regular elections and with SD 11 holding an additional special election for Randy Schoonover, who resigned on September 7, 1999. The election took place concurrently with the presidential, U.S. Senate, U.S. House, and gubernatorial elections. While Republican candidate for George W. Bush won the state in the presidential election, the Democratic Party won over 70% of the vote for state senate candidates and retained a supermajority in the state legislature's upper chamber.

== Summary ==
Summary of the November 2000 West Virginia Senate election results
| Party | Candidates | Votes | % | Seats | | | | |
| Party | Candidates | Votes | % | Before | Up | Won | After | +/– |
|---|---|---|---|---|---|---|---|---|
| Democratic | 18 | 484,336 | 70.4% | 29 | 15 | 14 | 28 | ▼1 |
| Republican | 10 | 200,791 | 29.3% | 5 | 3 | 4 | 6 | ▲1 |
| Libertarian | 1 | 2,885 | 0.3% | 0 | 0 | 0 | 0 | Steady |
| Total | | 688,012 | 100% | 34 | | | | |

Popular vote
| Democratic | 70.4% |
| Republican | 29.3% |
| Libertarian | 0.3% |

House seats
| Democratic | 82.4% |
| Republican | 17.6% |

== SD 1 ==
2000 West Virginia SD 1 general election
| Party | Candidate | Votes | % |
|---|---|---|---|
| Republican | Andy McKenzie (incumbent) | 19,168 | 54.3 |
| Democratic | Walter Bish | 16,159 | 45.7 |
| Total votes | | 35,327 | 100.0 |
| Republican hold | | | |

== SD 2 ==
2000 West Virginia SD 2 general election
| Party | Candidate | Votes | % |
|---|---|---|---|
| Democratic | Jeffrey V. Kessler (incumbent) | 22,344 | 69.7 |
| Republican | Larry Tighe | 9,726 | 30.3 |
| Total votes | | 32,070 | 100.0 |
| Democratic hold | | | |

== SD 3 ==
2000 West Virginia SD 3 general election
| Party | Candidate | Votes | % |
|---|---|---|---|
| Republican | Donna Boley (incumbent) | 28,396 | 70.7 |
| Democratic | Louis Flade | 11,786 | 29.3 |
| Total votes | | 40,182 | 100.0 |
| Republican hold | | | |

== SD 4 ==
2000 West Virginia SD 4 general election
| Party | Candidate | Votes | % |
|---|---|---|---|
| Republican | Karen Facemyer | 24,003 | 51.4 |
| Democratic | Robert Dittmar | 22,656 | 48.6 |
| Total votes | | 46,659 | 100.0 |
| Republican gain from Democratic | | | |

== SD 5 ==
2000 West Virginia SD 5 general election
| Party | Candidate | Votes | % |
|---|---|---|---|
| Democratic | Robert Plymale (incumbent) | 23,179 | 100.0 |
| Total votes | | 23,179 | 100.0 |
| Democratic hold | | | |

== SD 6 ==
2000 West Virginia SD 6 general election
| Party | Candidate | Votes | % |
|---|---|---|---|
| Democratic | John Pat Fanning (incumbent) | 19,770 | 100.0 |
| Total votes | | 19,770 | 100.0 |
| Democratic hold | | | |

== SD 7 ==
2000 West Virginia SD 7 general election
| Party | Candidate | Votes | % |
|---|---|---|---|
| Democratic | Earl Ray Tomblin (incumbent) | 26,408 | 100.0 |
| Total votes | | 26,408 | 100.0 |
| Democratic hold | | | |

== SD 8 ==
2000 West Virginia SD 8 general election
| Party | Candidate | Votes | % |
|---|---|---|---|
| Republican | Vic Sprouse (incumbent) | 39,188 | 53.1 |
| Democratic | Mark Hunt | 34,665 | 46.9 |
| Total votes | | 73,853 | 100.0 |
| Republican hold | | | |

== SD 9 ==
2000 West Virginia SD 9 general election
| Party | Candidate | Votes | % |
|---|---|---|---|
| Democratic | Billy Wayne Bailey (incumbent) | 24,094 | 100.0 |
| Total votes | | 24,094 | 100.0 |
| Democratic hold | | | |

== SD 10 ==
2000 West Virginia SD 10 general election
| Party | Candidate | Votes | % |
|---|---|---|---|
| Democratic | Anita Caldwell | 25,625 | 100.0 |
| Total votes | | 25,625 | 100.0 |
| Democratic hold | | | |

== SD 11 (Full term) ==
2000 West Virginia SD 11 general election
| Party | Candidate | Votes | % |
|---|---|---|---|
| Democratic | Shirley Love (incumbent) | 29,463 | 100.0 |
| Total votes | | 29,463 | 100.0 |
| Democratic hold | | | |

== SD 11 (Unexpired term) ==
2000 West Virginia SD 11 general election
| Party | Candidate | Votes | % |
|---|---|---|---|
| Democratic | Mark Burnette | 24,568 | 73.3 |
| Republican | Hiram Lewis | 8,960 | 26.7 |
| Total votes | | 33,528 | 100.0 |
| Democratic hold | | | |

== SD 12 ==
2000 West Virginia SD 12 general election
| Party | Candidate | Votes | % |
|---|---|---|---|
| Democratic | William R. Sharpe Jr. (incumbent) | 31,797 | 100.0 |
| Total votes | | 31,797 | 100.0 |
| Democratic hold | | | |

== SD 13 ==
2000 West Virginia SD 13 general election
| Party | Candidate | Votes | % |
|---|---|---|---|
| Democratic | Roman Prezioso (incumbent) | 32,039 | 100.0 |
| Total votes | | 32,039 | 100.0 |
| Democratic hold | | | |

== SD 14 ==
2000 West Virginia SD 14 general election
| Party | Candidate | Votes | % |
|---|---|---|---|
| Democratic | Jon Blair Hunter (incumbent) | 21,528 | 53.7 |
| Republican | Robert Harman | 15,696 | 39.1 |
| Libertarian | John Bartlett | 2,885 | 7.2 |
| Total votes | | 40,109 | 100.0 |
| Democratic hold | | | |

== SD 15 ==
2000 West Virginia SD 15 general election
| Party | Candidate | Votes | % |
|---|---|---|---|
| Democratic | Mike Ross (incumbent) | 28,055 | 100.0 |
| Total votes | | 28,055 | 100.0 |
| Democratic hold | | | |

== SD 16 ==
2000 West Virginia SD 16 general election
| Party | Candidate | Votes | % |
|---|---|---|---|
| Democratic | Herb Snyder (incumbent) | 20,408 | 50.6 |
| Republican | Greg Corliss | 19,915 | 49.4 |
| Total votes | | 40,323 | 100.0 |
| Democratic hold | | | |

== SD 17 ==
2000 West Virginia SD 17 general election
| Party | Candidate | Votes | % |
|---|---|---|---|
| Democratic | Larry L. Rowe (incumbent) | 45,224 | 62.8 |
| Republican | Charles Lewis | 26,779 | 37.2 |
| Total votes | | 72,003 | 100.0 |
| Democratic hold | | | |
