= 1998 West Virginia Senate election =

1998 West Virginia Senate elections
- November 3, 1998

18 of 34 seats in the West Virginia Senate (17 regular, 1 special) 18 seats needed for a majority
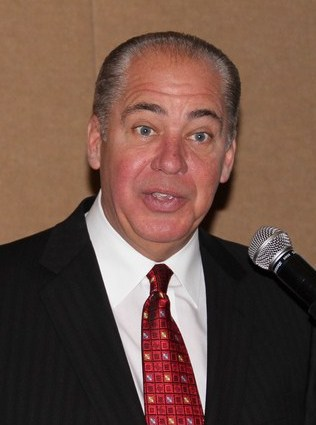

	Majority party	Minority party
Leader	Earl Ray Tomblin	Vic Sprouse
Party	Democratic	Republican
Leader since	1995	1998
Leader's seat	SD 7	SD 8
Seats before	25	9
Seats after	29	5
Seat change	▲4	▼4
Popular vote	265,373	149,651
Percentage	63.2%	35.6%
Seats up	12	6
Seats won	16	2

Circular inset (SD 2): Special election
Holds and gains
Democratic gain Democratic hold
Republican hold
Democratic
50–60%
60–70%
80–90%
>90%
Republican
50–60%
Senate President before election
Earl Ray Tomblin
Democratic
Elected Senate President
Earl Ray Tomblin
Democratic

The 1998 West Virginia Senate election took place on Tuesday, November 3, 1998. State senate seats in West Virginia are staggered, with senators serving 4-year terms. 18 of the 34 state senate seats were up for election, with SD 2 holding an additional special election for Larry Wiedebusch's seat, who died on October 25, 1997. Jeffrey V. Kessler was appointed to fill the seat and was re-elected by a wide margin. The election took place concurrently with the U.S. House elections. The Democratic Party won over 60% of the vote for state senate candidates and flipped 4 Republican seats, retaining a supermajority in the state legislature's upper chamber.

== Summary ==
Summary of the 1998 West Virginia Senate election results
Party	Candidates	Votes	%	Seats				
Party	Candidates	Votes	%	Before	Up	Won	After	+/–
Democratic	18	265,373	63.2%	25	12	16	29	▲4
Republican	13	149,651	35.6%	9	6	2	5	▼4
Libertarian	3	5,100	1.2%	0	0	0	0	Steady
Write-in	1	8	nil	0	0	0	0	Steady
Total		420,124	100%	34	18		34	Steady

Popular vote
Democratic	63.2%
Republican	35.6%
Libertarian	1.2%
Write-in	nil%

Senate seats
Democratic	85.3%
Republican	14.7%

== SD 1 ==
1998 West Virginia SD 1 general election
Party	Candidate	Votes	%
Democratic	Edwin Bowman (incumbent)	14,118	64.0
Republican	Don Chaney	7,944	36.0
Total votes		22,062	100.0
Democratic hold			

== SD 2 (Full term) ==
1998 West Virginia SD 2 general election
Party	Candidate	Votes	%
Democratic	Larry Edgell	11,253	56.4
Republican	Charles Clements	8,691	43.6
Total votes		19,944	100.0
Democratic hold			

== SD 2 (Unexpired term) ==
1998 West Virginia SD 2 general election
Party	Candidate	Votes	%
Democratic	Jeffrey Kessler	13,308	66.5
Republican	Douglas Sapp	6,697	33.5
Total votes		20,005	100.0
Democratic hold			

== SD 3 ==
1998 West Virginia SD 3 general election
Party	Candidate	Votes	%
Republican	Frank Deem (incumbent)	14,159	53.2
Democratic	Paul Thornton	12,465	46.8
Write-in	Larry Butcher	8	nil
Total votes		26,632	100.0
Republican hold			

== SD 4 ==
1998 West Virginia SD 4 general election
Party	Candidate	Votes	%
Democratic	Oshel Craigo (incumbent)	18,183	57.7
Republican	Kelly Given	13,328	42.3
Total votes		31,511	100.0
Democratic hold			

== SD 5 ==
1998 West Virginia SD 5 general election
Party	Candidate	Votes	%
Democratic	Marie Redd	9,082	50.6
Republican	Thomas Scott (incumbent)	8,867	49.4
Total votes		17,949	100.0
Democratic gain from Republican			

== SD 6 ==
1998 West Virginia SD 6 general election
Party	Candidate	Votes	%
Democratic	H. Truman Chafin (incumbent)	10,669	100.0
Total votes		10,669	100.0
Democratic hold			

== SD 7 ==
1998 West Virginia SD 7 general election
Party	Candidate	Votes	%
Democratic	Lloyd G. Jackson II (incumbent)	11,840	100.0
Total votes		11,840	100.0
Democratic hold			

== SD 8 ==
1998 West Virginia SD 8 general election
Party	Candidate	Votes	%
Democratic	John R. Mitchell, Jr.	26,149	57.1
Republican	Jack Buckalew (incumbent)	19,643	42.9
Total votes		45,792	100.0
Democratic gain from Republican			

== SD 9 ==
1998 West Virginia SD 9 general election
Party	Candidate	Votes	%
Democratic	William R. Wooton (incumbent)	11,552	80.0
Libertarian	Joy Johnson	2,892	20.0
Total votes		14,444	100.0
Democratic hold			

== SD 10 ==
1998 West Virginia SD 10 general election
Party	Candidate	Votes	%
Democratic	Leonard Anderson	11,452	61.4
Republican	Thomas Fast	6,022	33.3
Libertarian	Elizabeth Simmons	1,175	6.3
Total votes		18,649	100.0
Democratic hold			

== SD 11 ==
1998 West Virginia SD 11 general election
Party	Candidate	Votes	%
Democratic	Randy Schoonover (incumbent)	15,065	100.0
Total votes		15,065	100.0
Democratic hold			

== SD 12 ==
1998 West Virginia SD 12 general election
Party	Candidate	Votes	%
Democratic	Joseph M. Minard	15,961	65.5
Republican	David Hinkle	8,416	34.5
Total votes		24,377	100.0
Democratic hold			

== SD 13 ==
1998 West Virginia SD 13 general election
Party	Candidate	Votes	%
Democratic	Mike Oliverio (incumbent)	19,094	100.0
Total votes		19,094	100.0
Democratic hold			

== SD 14 ==
1998 West Virginia SD 14 general election
Party	Candidate	Votes	%
Republican	Sarah Minear (incumbent)	15,230	56.3
Democratic	Gary Livengood	10,795	39.9
Libertarian	John Bartlett	1,033	3.8
Total votes		27,058	100.0
Republican hold			

== SD 15 ==
1998 West Virginia SD 15 general election
Party	Candidate	Votes	%
Democratic	Walt Helmick (incumbent)	14,879	61.7
Republican	Les Shoemaker	9,238	38.3
Total votes		24,117	100.0
Democratic hold			

== SD 16 ==
1998 West Virginia SD 16 general election
Party	Candidate	Votes	%
Democratic	John Unger	13,037	55.5
Republican	Harry Dugan (incumbent)	10,439	44.5
Total votes		23,476	100.0
Democratic gain from Republican			

== SD 17 ==
2000 West Virginia SD 17 general election
Party	Candidate	Votes	%
Democratic	Brooks McCabe	26,471	55.8
Republican	Larry Kimble	20,977	44.2
Total votes		47,448	100.0
Democratic gain from Republican			
