= 2002 West Virginia Senate election =

2002 West Virginia Senate elections
- November 5, 2002

17 of 34 seats in the West Virginia Senate 18 seats needed for a majority
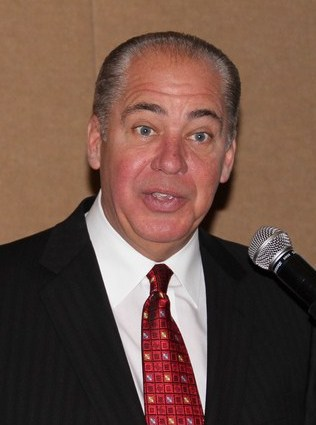

	Majority party	Minority party
Leader	Earl Ray Tomblin	Vic Sprouse
Party	Democratic	Republican
Leader since	1995	1998
Leader's seat	SD 7	SD 8
Seats before	28	6
Seats after	24	10
Seat change	▼4	▲4
Popular vote	278,449	176,195
Percentage	61.1%	38.7%
Seats up	15	2
Seats won	11	6

Holds and gains
Democratic hold
Republican gain Republican hold
Democratic
50–60%
60–70%
80–90%
>90%
Republican
50–60%
60–70%
Senate President before election
Earl Ray Tomblin
Democratic
Elected Senate President
Earl Ray Tomblin
Democratic

The 2002 West Virginia Senate election took place on Tuesday, November 5, 2002, to elect members of the 76th Legislature. 17 of the 34 state senate seats were up for election. State senate seats in West Virginia are staggered, with senators serving 4-year terms. The election took place concurrently with the U.S. House elections. The Democratic Party won over 60% of the vote for state senate candidates, retaining a supermajority, but lost 4 seats to Republicans.

== Summary ==
Summary of the 2002 West Virginia Senate election results
Party	Candidates	Votes	%	Seats				
Party	Candidates	Votes	%	Before	Up	Won	After	+/–
Democratic	17	278,449	61.1%	28	15	11	24	▼4
Republican	12	176,195	38.7%	6	2	6	10	▲4
Mountain	1	1,173	0.2%	0	0	0	0	Steady
Constitution	1	39	nil	0	0	0	0	Steady
Total		455,856	100%	34	17		34	Steady

Popular vote
Democratic	61.1%
Republican	38.7%
Mountain	0.2%
Constitution	nil%

Senate seats
Democratic	70.6%
Republican	29.4%

== Predictions ==
Source	Ranking	As of
The Cook; Political Report	Safe D	October 4, 2002

== SD 1 ==
2002 West Virginia SD 1 general election
Party	Candidate	Votes	%
Democratic	Edwin Bowman (incumbent)	16,150	100.0
Total votes		16,150	100.0
Democratic hold			

== SD 2 ==
2002 West Virginia SD 2 general election
Party	Candidate	Votes	%
Democratic	Larry Edgell (incumbent)	18,030	100.0
Total votes		18,030	100.0
Democratic hold			

== SD 3 ==
2002 West Virginia SD 3 general election
Party	Candidate	Votes	%
Republican	Frank Deem (incumbent)	16,248	58.6
Democratic	Jim Ball	11,459	41.4
Total votes		27,707	100.0
Democratic hold			

== SD 4 ==
2002 West Virginia SD 4 general election
Party	Candidate	Votes	%
Republican	Lisa D. Smith	18,193	52.4
Democratic	Oshel Craigo (incumbent)	16,505	47.6
Total votes		34,698	100.0
Republican gain from Democratic			

== SD 5 ==
2002 West Virginia SD 5 general election
Party	Candidate	Votes	%
Democratic	Evan H. Jenkins	12,192	50.2
Republican	Thomas Scott	12,089	49.8
Total votes		24,281	100.0
Democratic hold			

== SD 6 ==
2002 West Virginia SD 6 general election
Party	Candidate	Votes	%
Democratic	H. Truman Chafin (incumbent)	12,713	100.0
Total votes		12,713	100.0
Democratic hold			

== SD 7 ==
2002 West Virginia SD 7 general election
Party	Candidate	Votes	%
Democratic	Tracy Dempsey	13,970	69.2
Republican	Doug Waldron	6,221	30.8
Total votes		20,191	100.0
Democratic hold			

== SD 8 ==
2002 West Virginia SD 8 general election
Party	Candidate	Votes	%
Republican	Steve Harrison	30,329	53.8
Democratic	John R. Mitchell (incumbent)	26,083	46.2
Total votes		56,412	100.0
Republican gain from Democratic			

== SD 9 ==
2002 West Virginia SD 9 general election
Party	Candidate	Votes	%
Republican	Russ Weeks	9,982	51.7
Democratic	William Wooton (incumbent)	9,340	48.3
Total votes		19,322	100.0
Republican gain from Democratic			

== SD 10 ==
2002 West Virginia SD 10 general election
Party	Candidate	Votes	%
Republican	Jesse Guills	14,760	58.2
Democratic	Mary Compton	10,607	41.8
Total votes		25,367	100.0
Republican gain from Democratic			

== SD 11 ==
2002 West Virginia SD 11 general election
Party	Candidate	Votes	%
Democratic	Randy White	16,256	64.3
Republican	Rick Rice	9,024	35.7
Total votes		25,280	100.0
Democratic hold			

== SD 12 ==
2002 West Virginia SD 12 general election
Party	Candidate	Votes	%
Democratic	Joe Minard (incumbent)	20,615	80.3
Republican	Toni Tampoya	5,070	19.7
Total votes		25,685	100.0
Democratic hold			

== SD 13 ==
2002 West Virginia SD 13 general election
Party	Candidate	Votes	%
Democratic	Mike Oliverio (incumbent)	20,031	100.0
Total votes		20,615	100.0
Democratic hold			

== SD 14 ==
2002 West Virginia SD 14 general election
Party	Candidate	Votes	%
Republican	Sarah Minear (incumbent)	18,774	67.1
Democratic	James Baughman	9,190	32.8
Constitution	John Bartlett	39	0.1
Total votes		28,003	100.0
Republican hold			

== SD 15 ==
2002 West Virginia SD 15 general election
Party	Candidate	Votes	%
Democratic	Walt Helmick (incumbent)	14,630	55.7
Republican	Chris Davis	10,461	39.8
Mountain	Kit Patten	1,173	4.5
Total votes		26,264	100.0
Democratic hold			

== SD 16 ==
2002 West Virginia SD 16 general election
Party	Candidate	Votes	%
Democratic	John Unger (incumbent)	20,021	100.0
Total votes		20,021	100.0
Democratic hold			

== SD 17 ==
2002 West Virginia SD 15 general election
Party	Candidate	Votes	%
Democratic	Brooks McCabe (incumbent)	30,657	55.0
Republican	Patrick Lane	25,044	45.0
Total votes		55,701	100.0
Democratic hold			
