= List of third-party and independent performances in West Virginia state legislative elections =

Hundreds of third-party, independent, and write-in candidates have run for state office in the state of West Virginia. Only candidates who achieved more than 5% of the vote are included.

== State senate ==
Election	District	Party	Candidate	Votes	%	Place	Ref	Note
2026	SD 3	Constitution	Ronnie Green	6,436	26.08 / 100	2nd of 2		RESULTS NOT FINAL
2026	SD 7	Independent	Shawn Legg	1,130	5.97 / 100	3rd of 3		RESULTS NOT FINAL
2026	SD 16	Libertarian	Travis L. Bost	11,729	38.67 / 100	2nd of 2		RESULTS NOT FINAL
2024	SD 9	Mountain	Betsy Orndoff-Sayers	5,551	13.32 / 100	2nd of 2		
2022	SD 9	Libertarian	Kari Woodson	5,194	21.9 / 100	2nd of 2		
2022	SD 10	Libertarian	Austin Lynch	8,529	31.3 / 100	2nd of 2		
2022	SD 15	Upwising WV	Robin Mills	5,148	19.6 / 100	2nd of 2		
2020	SD 3	Libertarian	Travis Shultz	3,363	7.5 / 100	3rd of 3		
2020	SD 15	Mountain	Donald Kinney	10,324	19.9 / 100	2nd of 2		
2018	SD 4	Independent	Amy Nichole Grady	4,005	11.0 / 100	3rd of 3		
2018	SD 15	Independent	Jason A. Armentrout	10,562	28.9 / 100	2nd of 2		
2016	SD 2	Libertarian	H. John Rogers	3,521	8.4 / 100	3rd of 3		
2014	SD 12	Libertarian	Patrick Smith	2,192	7.8 / 100	3rd of 3		
2010	SD 11	Libertarian	Thomas Thacker	2,843	10.6 / 100	3rd of 3		
2010	SD 17	Mountain	David Hall	3,628	6.3 / 100	3rd of 3		
2008	SD 11	Mountain	Andy Waddell	2,682	7.4 / 100	3rd of 3		
2000	SD 14	Libertarian	John Bartlett	2,885	7.2 / 100	3rd of 3		
1998	SD 9	Libertarian	Joy Johnson	2,892	20.0 / 100	2nd of 2		
1998	SD 10	Libertarian	Elizabeth Simmons	1,175	6.3 / 100	3rd of 3		
1994	SD 7	Write-in	David Bell	2,992	19.4 / 100	2nd of 1		
1968	SD 12	Write-in	Robert G. Phillips	4,327	17.1 / 100	2nd of 1		
1968	SD 13	Write-in	Joseph B. Lightburn	2,980	9.7 / 100	2nd of 1		
1914	SD 4	Progressive	J. E. Barrows	768	6.0 / 100	3rd of 4		
1914	SD 8	Socialist	Peter H. Camp	3,450	15.2 / 100	3rd of 4		
1914	SD 9	Independent	Z. W. Campbell	1,674	8.3 / 100	3rd of 4		
1914	SD 11	Independent	L. F. Cartright	1,088	6.7 / 100	3rd of 5		
1914	SD 11	Progressive	T. F. Lanham	995	6.1 / 100	4th of 5		
1914	SD 12	Socialist	A. L. Knight	1,213	7.5 / 100	3rd of 5		
1914	SD 12	Progressive	John L. Ruhl	948	5.8 / 100	4th of 5		
1912	SD 1	Socialist	Herbert C. Zogg	1,834	10.2 / 100	3rd of 4		
1912	SD 2	Progressive	J. W. McIntire	3,392	23.1 / 100	3rd of 5		
1912	SD 2	Socialist	C. L. Conant	801	5.5 / 100	4th of 5		
1912	SD 6	Socialist	A. R. Browning	3,898	16.4 / 100	3rd of 4		
1912	SD 11	Socialist	L. F. Cartright	1,453	7.7 / 100	3rd of 4		
1912	SD 12	Socialist	A. L. Knight	1,176	6.5 / 100	3rd of 4		

== House of Delegates ==
Election	District	Party	Candidate	Votes	%	Place	Ref	Note
2026	HD 3	Independent	Dave Cantrell	828	18.82 / 100	3rd of 3		RESULTS NOT FINAL
2026	HD 12	Libertarian	Stephen Thomas Smith	375	5.93 / 100	3rd of 3		RESULTS NOT FINAL
2026	HD 13	Independent	James Hendershot Jr.	375	9.02 / 100	3rd of 3		RESULTS NOT FINAL
2026	HD 15	Libertarian	Tye Ward	1,197	27.96 / 100	2nd of 2		RESULTS NOT FINAL
2026	HD 33	Independent	Leroy Dehart	467	13.90 / 100	3rd of 3		RESULTS NOT FINAL
2026	HD 39	Independent	Ronnie Oakley	255	6.47 / 100	3rd of 3		RESULTS NOT FINAL
2026	HD 50	Independent	Tom Louisos	834	27.38 / 100	2nd of 3		RESULTS NOT FINAL
2026	HD 50	Constitution	Stacey L. Hensley	401	13.16 / 100	3rd of 3		RESULTS NOT FINAL
2026	HD 54	Independent	Tara Martinez	877	19.95 / 100	2nd of 2		RESULTS NOT FINAL
2026	HD 64	Constitution	Nate Stansberry	1,072	26.75 / 100	2nd of 2		RESULTS NOT FINAL
2026	HD 79	Mountain	Paige Riering	833	22.82 / 100	2nd of 2		RESULTS NOT FINAL
2026	HD 80	Constitution	Melissa Ann Deserio	496	14.24 / 100	2nd of 2		RESULTS NOT FINAL
2026	HD 84	Independent	Joshua Haskiell	430	9.48 / 100	3rd of 3		RESULTS NOT FINAL
2026	HD 89	Constitution	Walter S. Long Sr.	696	12.53 / 100	3rd of 3		RESULTS NOT FINAL
2026	HD 93	Constitution	Tara B Mccoy	1,592	43.03 / 100	2nd of 2		RESULTS NOT FINAL
2026	HD 95	Constitution	Daniel Walls	280	6.46 / 100	3rd of 3		RESULTS NOT FINAL
2026	HD 96	Constitution	Becky Jane Dunmire	420	9.18 / 100	3rd of 3		RESULTS NOT FINAL
2024	HD 50	Independent	Scotty Bowman	396	6.75 / 100	3rd of 3		
2024	HD 91	Constitution	Rick Thomson	1,753	23.46 / 100	2nd of 2		
2022	HD 7	Mountain	Dylan Parsons	356	6.6 / 100	3rd of 3		
2022	HD 12	Libertarian	Stephen Thomas Smith	295	7.5 / 100	3rd of 3		
2022	HD 31	Independent	Brannon D. Akers	377	9.9 / 100	3rd of 3		
2022	HD 57	Mountain	Bud Anderson	285	5.7 / 100	3rd of 3		
2022	HD 62	Americans; Coming Together	Laura McGinnis	899	18.5 / 100	2nd of 2		
2022	HD 89	Independent	Robert B. Wolford	1,253	24.9 / 100	2nd of 2		
2022	HD 91	Americans; Coming Together	S. Marshall Wilson	1,666	39.7 / 100	2nd of 2		
2020	HD 15 (1 seat)	Libertarian	Michael A. Young	586	5.9 / 100	3rd of 3		
2020	HD 46 (1 seat)	Libertarian	Michael Lockard	484	5.8 / 100	3rd of 3		
2020	HD 59 (1 seat)	Independent	Patch Adams	1,656	16.1 / 100	2nd of 3		
2020	HD 59 (1 seat)	Mountain	Robert E. Smith	1,271	12.4 / 100	3rd of 3		
2020	HD 61 (1 seat)	Mountain	Mary Kinnie	489	5.3 / 100	3rd of 3		
2020	HD 63 (1 seat)	Libertarian	Brett David Rogers	544	6.5 / 100	3rd of 3		
2018	HD 2 (1 seat)	Independent	Trevor Barnhart	481	8.5 / 100	3rd of 3		
2018	HD 6 (1 seat)	Independent	J. Scott Beaver	418	8.2 / 100	3rd of 3		
2018	HD 13 (2 seats)	Independent	Todd Mullins	2,620	13.2 / 100	4th of 4		
2018	HD 15 (1 seat)	Independent	Tess Jackson	721	9.3 / 100	3rd of 3		
2018	HD 22 (1 seat)	Independent	Jeff E. Eldridge	2,596	15.2 / 100	4th of 5		
2018	HD 32 (3 seats)	Mountain	David Pritt	2,384	6.0 / 100	7th of 7		
2018	HD 39 (1 seat)	Independent	Dana J. Ferrell	1,315	22.8 / 100	3rd of 3		
2018	HD 39 (1 seat)	Independent	Jon Dodds	3,267	6.9 / 100	6th of 6		
2018	HD 53 (1 seat)	Libertarian	Austin Zuchowski	428	6.3 / 100	3rd of 3		
2018	HD 58 (1 seat)	Independent	Brooks MccCumbee	401	6.5 / 100	3rd of 3		
2018	HD 63 (1 seat)	Libertarian	Brett David Rogers	481	8.4 / 100	3rd of 3		
2016	HD 19 (1 seat)	Libertarian	Derrick Evans	1,881	8.8 / 100	5th of 5		
2016	HD 44 (1 seat)	Mountain	Barbara Daniels	443	7.6 / 100	3rd of 3		
2016	HD 45 (1 seat)	Libertarian	Tom Thacker	1,682	24.0 / 100	2nd of 2		
2016	HD 55 (1 seat)	Libertarian	Tonya Persinger	449	5.7 / 100	3rd of 3		
2014	HD 11 (1 seat)	Mountain	Mark Myers	807	19.0 / 100	2nd of 2		
2014	HD 15 (1 seat)	Independent	Christian Watts	1,095	20.7 / 100	2nd of 2		
2014	HD 34 (2 seats)	Independent	Larry E. Rogers	2,287	21.0 / 100	3rd of 3		
2014	HD 34 (4 seats)	Independent	Tom Louisos	2,287	8.8 / 100	7th of 8		
2014	HD 58 (4 seats)	Independent	Brenda Hutchinson	1,452	31.9 / 100	2nd of 2		
2014	HD 59 (1 seat)	Constitution	Brenda Hutchinson	347	6.9 / 100	3rd of 3		
2014	HD 66 (1 seat)	Mountain	Daniel P. Lutz	876	22.2 / 100	2nd of 2		
2012	HD 5 (1 seat)	Mountain	Raymond V. Davis	761	13.4 / 100	2nd of 3		
2012	HD 5 (1 seat)	Constitution	Denzil W. Sloan	335	5.9 / 100	3rd of 3		
2012	HD 11 (1 seat)	Mountain	Mark Myers	1,093	18.9 / 100	2nd of 2		
2012	HD 12 (1 seat)	Mountain	Justin Johnson	351	5.1 / 100	3rd of 3		
2012	HD 37 (1 seat)	Mountain	Derrick Westley Shaffer	646	12.4 / 100	2nd of 2		
2012	HD 52 (1 seat)	Constitution	Rick Bartlett	965	19.6 / 100	2nd of 2		
2010	HD 1 (2 seats)	Independent	Amanda M. Mesler	4,447 (Note: 8 votes away from winning a seat.)	28.2 / 100	3rd of 3		
2010	HD 11 (1 seat)	Mountain	Mark Steven Meyers	769	19.1 / 100	2nd of 2		
2010	HD 31 (2 seats)	Independent	Janet Thompson	238	6.0 / 100	3rd of 3		
2010	HD 32 (3 seats)	Mountain	Jesse Johnson	2,022	5.1 / 100	7th of 7		
2010	HD 36 (1 seat)	Independent	Duane D. Borchers	1,007	28.3 / 100	2nd of 2		
2008	HD 5 (1 seat)	Constitution	Denzil W. Sloan	917	15.4 / 100	2nd of 2		
2006	HD 51 (1 seat)	Mountain	Robert Mills	369	8.4 / 100	3rd of 3		
2004	HD 7 (1 seat)	Independent	Travis Shultz	561	7.5 / 100	3rd of 3		
2002	HD 5 (1 seat)	Constitution	Denzil W. Sloan	433	12.5 / 100	2nd of 2		
2002	HD 35 (1 seat)	Reform	Steve Forloine	659	17.4 / 100	2nd of 2		
2002	HD 36 (1 seat)	Mountain	Bob Henry Baber	376	9.7 / 100	3rd of 3		
2002	HD 37 (2 seats)	Reform	Kimberly S. Nottingham	847	5.3 / 100	4th of 5		
2002	HD 51 (1 seat)	Mountain	Barbara Tudor	394	9.5 / 100	3rd of 3		
2002	HD 55 (1 seat)	Mountain	Vince George	1,396	38.9 / 100	2nd of 2		
2000	HD 26 (1 seat)	Libertarian	Richard W. Dulee	1,301	23.5 / 100	2nd of 2		
2000	HD 31 (1 seat)	Independent	Janet Thompson	324	7.2 / 100	3rd of 4		
2000	HD 48 (1 seat)	Write-in	Adam Peters	1,315	18.3 / 100	3rd of 2		
2000	HD 55 (1 seat)	Write-in	Robert C. Tabb	884	12.6 / 100	3rd of 2		
1998	HD 9 (1 seat)	Independent	Jim Marion	380	8.2 / 100	3rd of 3		
1998	HD 22 (2 seats)	Libertarian	Richard Church	536	6.2 / 100	3rd of 3		
1998	HD 23 (2 seats)	Libertarian	David Wheland	606	6.2 / 100	4th of 4		
1998	HD 26 (1 seat)	Write-in	Bevie J. Baker	161	5.6 / 100	2nd of 1		
1998	HD 27 (5 seats)	Libertarian	Wallace Johnson	3,149	6.4 / 100	6th of 6		
1998	HD 31 (1 seat)	Libertarian	John Welbourne	284	11.0 / 100	2nd of 2		
1996	HD 4 (2 seats)	Independent	Joe Pariott	5,875	27.8 / 100	3rd of 3		
1990	HD 24 (3 seats)	Independent	Connie Taylor	2,272	10.1 / 100	4th of 4		
1976	HD 22 (2 seats)	Write-in	D. P. Given	1,596	8.1 / 100	3rd of 2		
1974	HD 15 (3 seats)	(Write-in); Democratic	Dan Burleson Mullens	4,355	17.6 / 100	Elected; 3rd of 5		
1952	Upshur (1 seat)	Write-in	Ben L. Beall	464	7.3 / 100	2nd of 1		
1944	Lewis (1 seat)	(Write-in); Democratic	Rush D. Holt	4,602	52.0 / 100	Elected; 1st of 3		
1934	Wayne (2 seats)	Labor	H. E. Kenney	1,034	5.5 / 100	4th of 5		
1934	Wayne (2 seats)	Labor	Charles M. Adkins	980	5.2 / 100	5th of 5		
1920	Clay (1 seat)	Independent	A. R. Brown	178	5.2 / 100	3rd of 3		
1914	Brooke (1 seat)	Independent	John Stephens	210	9.1 / 100	3rd of 3		
1914	Fayette (3 seats)	Fusion	Henry McGraw	4650	15.2 / 100	Elected; 1st of 9		
1914	Fayette (3 seats)	Fusion	C. W. Lemon	4482	14.7 / 100	Elected; 2nd of 9		
1914	Fayette (3 seats)	Fusion	F. T. Burnham	4464	14.7 / 100	Elected; 3rd of 9		
1914	Hancock (1 seat)	Progressive	Joseph I. Dickley	88	5.0 / 100	3rd of 4		
1914	Harrison (2 seats)	Independent	Deco VanHorn	1,036	5.6 / 100	5th of 10 (tie)		
1914	Harrison (2 seats)	Independent	Charles J. Kerr	1,036	5.6 / 100	5th of 10 (tie)		
1914	Mason (2 seats)	Progressive	T. H. Plants	600	7.0 / 100	5th of 8		
1914	Mason (2 seats)	Progressive	Lewis Hern	517	6.0 / 100	6th of 8		
1914	Monongalia (2 seats)	Progressive	C. William Cramer	570	6.3 / 100	5th of 8		
1914	Putnam (1 seat)	Independent	William F. Ray	166	5.0 / 100	3rd of 3		
1914	Raleigh (1 seat)	Independent	Everett Stover	469	8.6 / 100	3rd of 5		
1914	Randolph (1 seat)	Independent	W. P. Conrad	421	9.7 / 100	3rd of 4		
1914	Taylor (1 seat)	Independent	J. G. Brown	574	18.6 / 100	3rd of 3		
1914	Tucker (1 seat)	Independent	O. M. Nearhood	246	8.8 / 100	3rd of 4		
1914	Tyler (2 seats)	Progressive	K. S. Boreman	368	6.3 / 100	5th of 10		
1914	Tyler (2 seats)	Progressive	C. E. Schupbach	323	5.5 / 100	6th of 10		
1914	Upshur (1 seat)	Progressive	Delos Cutright	146	5.1 / 100	3rd of 4		
1914	Wayne (2 seats)	Independent	O. S. Newman	1,844	21.0 / 100	3rd of 4		
1914	Wirt (1 seat)	Progressive	B. T. Board	118	6.2 / 100	3rd of 3		
