= 2006 West Virginia Senate election =

2006 West Virginia Senate elections
- November 7, 2006

17 of 34 seats in the West Virginia Senate 18 seats needed for a majority
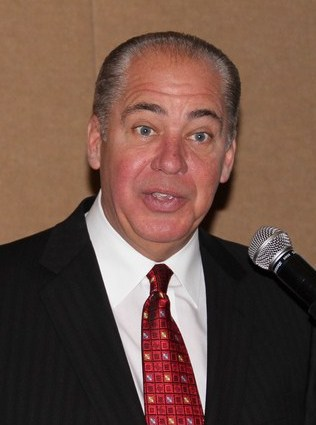

	Majority party	Minority party
Leader	Earl Ray Tomblin	Vic Sprouse
Party	Democratic	Republican
Leader since	1995	1998
Leader's seat	SD 7	SD 8
Seats before	21	13
Seats after	23	11
Seat change	▲2	▼2
Popular vote	301,122	172,007
Percentage	63.6%	36.4%
Seats up	11	6
Seats won	13	4

Holds and gains
Democratic gain Democratic hold
Republican hold
Democratic
50–60%
60–70%
70–80%
>90%
Republican
50–60%
>90%
Senate President before election
Earl Ray Tomblin
Democratic
Elected Senate President
Earl Ray Tomblin
Democratic

The 2006 West Virginia Senate election took place on Tuesday, November 7, 2006, to elect members to the 78th and 79th Legislature. 17 of the 34 state senate seats were up for election. State senate seats in West Virginia are staggered, with senators serving 4-year terms. The election took place concurrently with the U.S. House and U.S. Senate elections. The Democratic Party won over 60% of the vote for state senate candidates and picked up 2 seats held by Republicans, retaining their supermajority. While President George W. Bush won the state in the previous presidential election, Democrats did well across the country and the state in a year described as a blue wave.

== Summary ==
Summary of the 2006 West Virginia Senate election results
Party	Candidates	Votes	%	Seats				
Party	Candidates	Votes	%	Before	Up	Won	After	+/–
Democratic	16	301,122	63.6%	21	11	13	23	▲2
Republican	13	172,007	36.4%	13	6	4	11	▼2
Write-in		102	nil	0	0	0	0	Steady
Total		473,231	100%	34	17		34	Steady

Popular vote
Democratic	63.6%
Republican	36.4%
Write-in	nil%

Seats won
Democratic	76.5%
Republican	23.5%

Total senate seats
Democratic	67.7%
Republican	32.3%

== Predictions ==
Source	Ranking	As of
Rothenberg	Safe D	November 4, 2006

== SD 1 ==
2006 West Virginia SD 1 general election
Party	Candidate	Votes	%
Democratic	Edwin Bowman (incumbent)	17,889	69.9
Republican	George Village	7,690	30.1
Total votes		25,579	100.0
Democratic hold			

== SD 2 ==
2006 West Virginia SD 2 general election
Party	Candidate	Votes	%
Democratic	Larry Edgell (incumbent)	17,009	64.9
Republican	Wayne Weber	9,184	35.1
Total votes		26,193	100.0
Democratic hold			

== SD 3 ==
2006 West Virginia SD 3 general election
Party	Candidate	Votes	%
Republican	J. Frank Deem (incumbent)	19,930	99.5
Write-in		92	0.5
Total votes		20,022	100.0
Republican hold			

== SD 4 ==
2006 West Virginia SD 4 general election
Party	Candidate	Votes	%
Republican	Mike Hall	17,438	51.9
Democratic	Jim Lees	16,135	48.1
Total votes		33,573	100.0
Republican hold			

== SD 5 ==
2006 West Virginia SD 5 general election
Party	Candidate	Votes	%
Democratic	Evan Jenkins (incumbent)	16,502	64.1
Republican	Thomas Scott	9,257	35.9
Total votes		25,759	100.0
Democratic hold			

== SD 6 ==
2006 West Virginia SD 6 general election
Party	Candidate	Votes	%
Democratic	H. Truman Chafin (incumbent)	14,621	100.0
Total votes		14,621	100.0
Democratic hold			

== SD 7 ==
2006 West Virginia SD 7 general election
Party	Candidate	Votes	%
Democratic	Ron Stollings	16,437	77.2
Republican	Larry Lyons	4,865	22.8
Total votes		21,302	100.0
Democratic hold			

== SD 8 ==
2006 West Virginia SD 8 general election
Party	Candidate	Votes	%
Democratic	Erik Wells	31,073	58.1
Republican	Mark Plants	22,408	41.9
Total votes		53,481	100.0
Democratic gain from Republican			

== SD 9 ==
2006 West Virginia SD 9 general election
Party	Candidate	Votes	%
Democratic	Mike Green	12,109	55.7
Republican	Russ Weeks (incumbent)	9,628	44.3
Total votes		21,737	100.0
Democratic gain from Republican			

== SD 10 ==
2006 West Virginia SD 10 general election
Party	Candidate	Votes	%
Republican	Jesse Guills (incumbent)	12,590	51.5
Democratic	Frederick Parker	11,849	48.5
Total votes		24,439	100.0
Republican hold			

== SD 11 ==
2006 West Virginia SD 11 general election
Party	Candidate	Votes	%
Democratic	Randy White (incumbent)	12,991	52.7
Republican	Pete Sigler	11,679	47.3
Total votes		24,670	100.0
Democratic hold			

== SD 12 ==
2006 West Virginia SD 12 general election
Party	Candidate	Votes	%
Democratic	Joe Minard (incumbent)	22,218	100.0
Total votes		22,218	100.0
Democratic hold			

== SD 13 ==
2006 West Virginia SD 13 general election
Party	Candidate	Votes	%
Democratic	Mike Oliverio (incumbent)	25,060	100.0
Total votes		25,060	100.0
Democratic hold			

== SD 14 ==
2006 West Virginia SD 14 general election
Party	Candidate	Votes	%
Republican	Dave Sypolt	16,057	52.8
Democratic	Craig Rotruck	14,334	47.2
Write-in		10	nil
Total votes		30,401	100.0
Republican hold			

== SD 15 ==
2006 West Virginia SD 15 general election
Party	Candidate	Votes	%
Democratic	Walt Helmick (Incumbent)	21,509	99.6
Write-in		92	0.4
Total votes		21,601	100.0
Democratic hold			

== SD 16 ==
2006 West Virginia SD 16 general election
Party	Candidate	Votes	%
Democratic	John Unger (Incumbent)	19,640	64.7
Republican	Jerry Mays	10,729	35.3
Total votes		30,369	100.0
Democratic hold			

== SD 17 ==
2006 West Virginia SD 17 general election
Party	Candidate	Votes	%
Democratic	Brooks McCabe (Incumbent)	31,746	60.7
Republican	Ann Calvert	20,552	39.3
Total votes		52,298	100.0
Democratic hold			
