= 2008 West Virginia Senate election =

2008 West Virginia Senate elections
- November 4, 2008

17 of 34 seats in the West Virginia Senate 18 seats needed for a majority
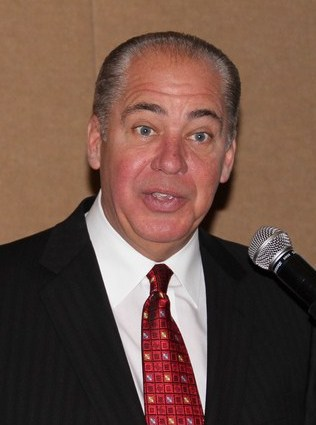

	Majority party	Minority party
Leader	Earl Ray Tomblin	Vic Sprouse (retired)
Party	Democratic	Republican
Leader since	1995	1998
Leader's seat	SD 7	SD 8
Seats before	23	11
Seats after	26	8
Seat change	▲3	▼3
Popular vote	435,696	273,442
Percentage	61.2%	38.4%
Seats up	10	7
Seats won	13	4

Holds and gains
Democratic gain Democratic hold
Republican hold
Democratic
50–60%
60–70%
70–80%
>90%
Republican
50–60%
60–70%
>90%
Senate President before election
Earl Ray Tomblin
Democratic
Elected Senate President
Earl Ray Tomblin
Democratic

The 2008 West Virginia Senate election took place on Tuesday, November 4, 2008, to elect members to the 79th and 80th Legislatures; held concurrently with the presidential, U.S. House, U.S. Senate, and gubernatorial elections. State senate seats in West Virginia are staggered, with senators serving 4-year terms. 17 of the 34 state senate seats were up for election. While Republican candidate for John McCain won the state in the presidential election by 13 points, the Democratic Party won over 60% of the vote for state senate and flipped 3 Republican seats, expanding the Democrats' supermajority.

== Summary ==
Summary of the 2008 West Virginia Senate election results
Party	Candidates	Votes	%	Seats				
Party	Candidates	Votes	%	Before 78th Leg.	Up	Won	After 79th Leg.	+/–
Democratic	16	435,696	61.2	23	10	13	26	▲3
Republican	14	273,442	38.4	11	7	4	8	▼3
Mountain	1	2,682	0.4	0	0	0	0	Steady
Total		711,820	100%	34	17		34	Steady

Popular vote
Democratic	61.2%
Republican	38.4%
Mountain	0.4%

Seats won
Democratic	76.5%
Republican	23.5%

Total senate seats
Democratic	76.5%
Republican	23.5%

== Predictions ==
Source	Ranking	As of
Stateline	Safe D	October 15, 2008

== SD 1 ==
2008 West Virginia SD 1 general election
Party	Candidate	Votes	%
Democratic	Jack Yost	23,938	60.3
Republican	Chris Wakim	15,782	29.7
Total votes		39,720	100.0
Democratic gain from Republican			

== SD 2 ==
2008 West Virginia SD 2 general election
Party	Candidate	Votes	%
Democratic	Jeffrey V. Kessler (incumbent)	23,875	63.8
Republican	Fred Brunner	13,564	26.2
Total votes		37,439	100.0
Democratic hold			

== SD 3 ==
2008 West Virginia SD 3 general election
Party	Candidate	Votes	%
Republican	Donna Boley (incumbent)	35,470	100.0
Total votes		35,470	100.0
Republican hold			

== SD 4 ==
2008 West Virginia SD 4 general election
Party	Candidate	Votes	%
Republican	Karen Facemyer (incumbent)	28,801	61.2
Democratic	Rocky Holmes	18,280	38.8
Total votes		47,081	100.0
Republican hold			

== SD 5 ==
2008 West Virginia SD 5 general election
Party	Candidate	Votes	%
Democratic	Robert Plymale (incumbent)	23,763	67.0
Republican	Stephen Hall	11,722	33.0
Total votes		35,485	100.0
Democratic hold			

== SD 6 ==
2008 West Virginia SD 6 general election
Party	Candidate	Votes	%
Democratic	John Pat Fanning (incumbent)	17,603	65.6
Republican	Mark Maynard	9,242	34.4
Total votes		26,845	100.0
Democratic hold			

== SD 7 ==
2008 West Virginia SD 7 general election
Party	Candidate	Votes	%
Democratic	Earl Ray Tomblin (incumbent)	24,010	73.1
Republican	Billy Marcum	8,813	26.9
Total votes		32,823	100.0
Democratic hold			

== SD 8 ==
2008 West Virginia SD 8 general election
Party	Candidate	Votes	%
Democratic	Corey Palumbo	52,151	67.6
Republican	Robert Ore	25,025	32.4
Total votes		77,176	100.0
Democratic gain from Republican			

== SD 9 ==
2008 West Virginia SD 9 general election
Party	Candidate	Votes	%
Democratic	Richard Browning	24,227	100.0
Total votes		24,227	100.0
Democratic hold			

== SD 10 ==
2008 West Virginia SD 10 general election
Party	Candidate	Votes	%
Republican	Donald Caruth (incumbent)	20,270	53.7
Democratic	James McNeely	17,486	46.3
Total votes		37,756	100.0
Republican hold			

== SD 11 ==
2008 West Virginia SD 11 general election
Party	Candidate	Votes	%
Democratic	William Laird IV	21,619	59.5
Republican	Aubry Wilson	11,984	33.0
Mountain	Andy Waddell	2,682	7.4
Total votes		36,285	100.0
Democratic hold			

== SD 12 ==
2008 West Virginia SD 12 general election
Party	Candidate	Votes	%
Democratic	Douglas Facemire	34,203	100.0
Total votes		34,203	100.0
Democratic hold			

== SD 13 ==
2008 West Virginia SD 13 general election
Party	Candidate	Votes	%
Democratic	Roman W. Prezioso, Jr. (incumbent)	35,520	100.0
Total votes		35,520	100.0
Democratic hold			

== SD 14 ==
2008 West Virginia SD 14 general election
Party	Candidate	Votes	%
Democratic	Bob Williams	22,205	51.3
Republican	Gary Howell	21,098	48.7
Total votes		43,303	100.0
Democratic hold			

== SD 15 ==
2008 West Virginia SD 15 general election
Party	Candidate	Votes	%
Republican	Clark Barnes	25,283	55.9
Democratic	Mark Ross	19,942	44.1
Total votes		45,225	100.0
Republican hold			

== SD 16 ==
2008 West Virginia SD 16 general election
Party	Candidate	Votes	%
Democratic	Herb Snyder	26,793	55.9
Republican	Bob Adams	21,098	44.1
Total votes		47,891	100.0
Democratic gain from Republican			

== SD 17 ==
2008 West Virginia SD 17 general election
Party	Candidate	Votes	%
Democratic	Dan Foster (incumbent)	50,081	66.4
Republican	Alan Long	25,290	33.6
Total votes		75,371	100.0
Democratic hold			

== See also ==
- 2008 United States presidential election in West Virginia
- 2008 United States Senate election in West Virginia
- 2008 United States House of Representatives elections in West Virginia
- 2008 West Virginia gubernatorial election
