= 2010 West Virginia Senate election =

2010 West Virginia Senate elections
- November 2, 2010

18 of 34 seats in the West Virginia Senate 18 seats needed for a majority
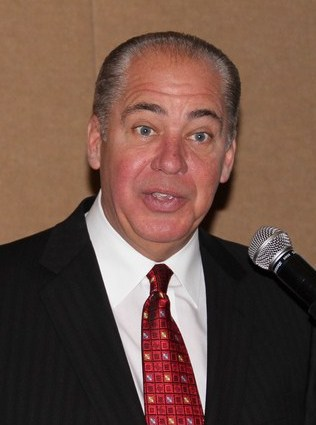

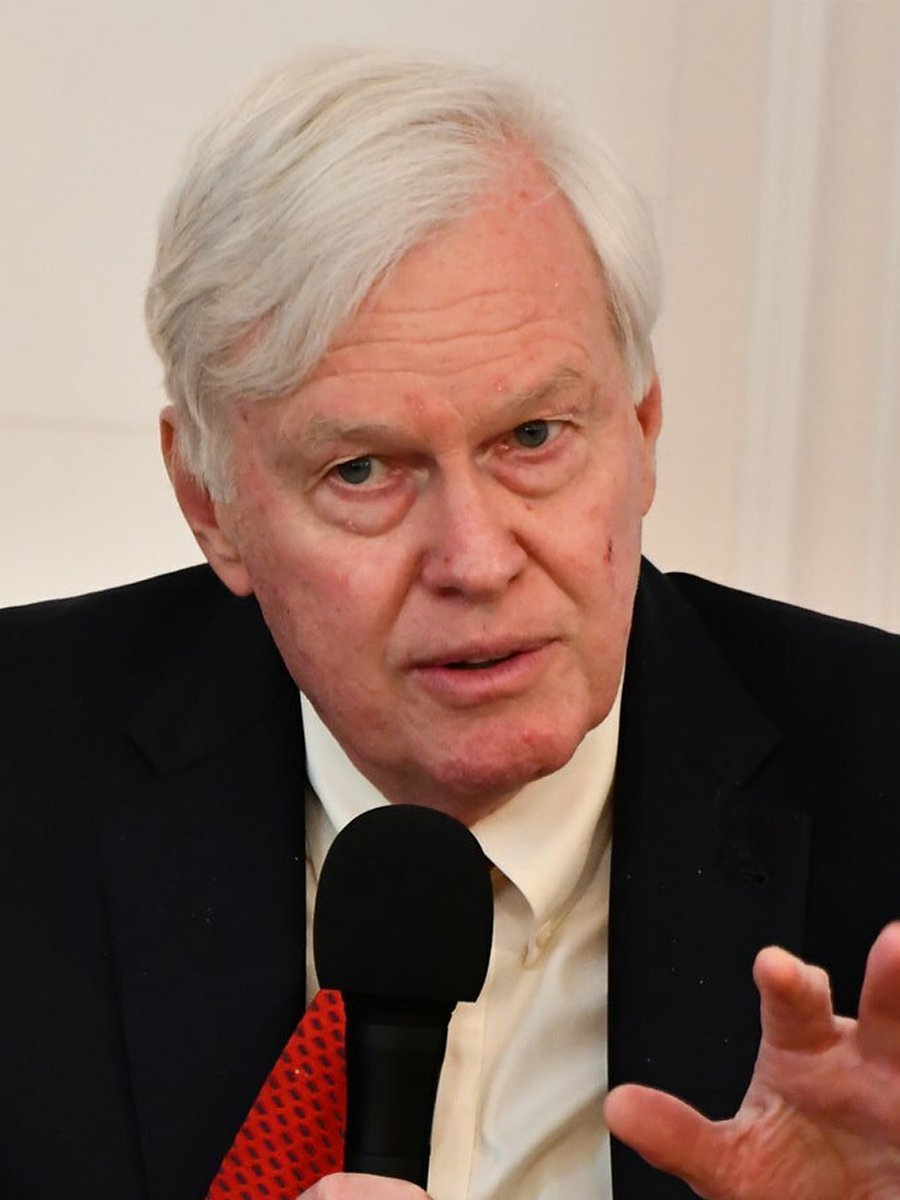
	Majority party	Minority party
Leader	Earl Ray Tomblin	Mike Hall
Party	Democratic	Republican
Leader since	1995	2010
Leader's seat	SD 7	SD 4
Seats before	26	8
Seats after	28	6
Seat change	▲2	▼2
Popular vote	315,959	231,902
Percentage	57.0%	41.8%
Seats up	13	5
Seats won	15	4

Holds and gains:
Democratic gain Democratic hold
Republican hold
Democratic
50–60%
60–70%
70–80%
>90%
Republican
50–60%
60–70%
>90%
Circular inset (SD 10): both seats up for election
Senate President before election
Earl Ray Tomblin
Democratic
Elected Senate President
Earl Ray Tomblin
Democratic

The 2010 West Virginia Senate election took place on Tuesday, November 2, 2010, to elect members to the 80th and 81st Legislatures; held concurrently with the U.S. House and U.S. Senate elections. State senate seats in West Virginia are staggered, with senators serving 4-year terms. 18 of the 34 state senate seats were up for election. 17 were regularly scheduled, with an additional special election in SD 10 after the death of Donald Caruth on May 1, 2010. John H. Shott was appointed to fill the seat, and Mark Wills was elected to finish the term. While Republicans made huge gains across the country, Democrats did well in the state senate, picking up two Republican seats.

== Summary ==
Summary of the 2010 West Virginia Senate election results
Party	Candidates	Votes	%	Seats				
Party	Candidates	Votes	%	Before 79th Leg.	Up	Won	After 80th Leg.	+/–
Democratic	16	315,959	57.0	26	13	15	28	▲2
Republican	13	231,902	41.8	8	5	3	6	▼2
Mountain	1	3,628	0.7	0	0	0	0	Steady
Libertarian	1	2,843	0.5	0	0	0	0	Steady
Total		554,332	100%	34	18		34	Steady

Popular vote
Democratic	57.0%
Republican	41.8%
Mountain	0.7%
Libertarian	0.5%

Seats won
Democratic	83.3%
Republican	16.7%

Total senate seats
Democratic	82.4%
Republican	17.6%

== Predictions ==
Source	Ranking	As of
Governing	Safe D	November 1, 2010

== SD 1 ==
2010 West Virginia SD 1 general election
Party	Candidate	Votes	%
Democratic	Orphy Klempa	17,179	58.6
Republican	Charles Schlegal	12,137	41.4
Total votes		29,316	100.0
Democratic hold			

== SD 2 ==
2010 West Virginia SD 2 general election
Party	Candidate	Votes	%
Democratic	Larry Edgell	19,885	100.0
Total votes		19,885	100.0
Democratic hold			

== SD 3 ==
2010 West Virginia SD 3 general election
Party	Candidate	Votes	%
Republican	David Nohe	21,295	67.7
Democratic	Timothy Reed	10,172	32.3
Total votes		31,467	100.0
Republican hold			

== SD 4 ==
2010 West Virginia SD 4 general election
Party	Candidate	Votes	%
Republican	Mike Hall	27,072	100.0
Total votes		27,072	100.0
Republican hold			

== SD 5 ==
2010 West Virginia SD 5 general election
Party	Candidate	Votes	%
Democratic	Evan Jenkins	19,813	100.0
Total votes		19,813	100.0
Democratic hold			

== SD 6 ==
2010 West Virginia SD 6 general election
Party	Candidate	Votes	%
Democratic	H. Truman Chafin	15,200	100.0
Total votes		15,200	100.0
Democratic hold			

== SD 7 ==
2010 West Virginia SD 7 general election
Party	Candidate	Votes	%
Democratic	Ron Stollings	18,188	100.0
Total votes		18,188	100.0
Democratic hold			

== SD 8 ==
2010 West Virginia SD 8 general election
Party	Candidate	Votes	%
Democratic	Erik Wells	36,280	61.2
Republican	Robert Ore	21,116	36.8
Total votes		57,396	100.0
Democratic hold			

== SD 9 ==
2010 West Virginia SD 9 general election
Party	Candidate	Votes	%
Democratic	Mike Green	14,757	57.7
Republican	James Mullins	10,829	42.3
Total votes		25,586	100.0
Democratic hold			

== SD 10 (Full term) ==
2010 West Virginia SD 10 general election
Party	Candidate	Votes	%
Democratic	Ronald Miller	14,093	51.9
Republican	Johnny Barnes	13,067	48.1
Total votes		27,160	100.0
Democratic gain from Republican			

== SD 10 (Unexpired term) ==
2010 West Virginia SD 10 special election
Party	Candidate	Votes	%
Democratic	Mark Wills	14,029	52.1
Republican	Phillip Stevens	12,900	47.9
Total votes		26,929	100.0
Democratic gain from Republican			

== SD 11 ==
2010 West Virginia SD 11 general election
Party	Candidate	Votes	%
Democratic	Gregory Tucker	14,644	54.7
Republican	Adam Milligan	9,303	34.7
Libertarian	Thomas Thacker	2,843	10.6
Total votes		26,790	100.0
Democratic hold			

== SD 12 ==
2010 West Virginia SD 12 general election
Party	Candidate	Votes	%
Democratic	Joseph Minard	20,337	61.9
Republican	Russel Snyder	12,506	38.1
Total votes		32,843	100.0
Democratic hold			

== SD 13 ==
2010 West Virginia SD 13 general election
Party	Candidate	Votes	%
Democratic	Robert Beach	16,882	50.3
Republican	Cynthia Frich	16,676	49.7
Total votes		33,558	100.0
Democratic hold			

== SD 14 ==
2010 West Virginia SD 14 general election
Party	Candidate	Votes	%
Republican	David Sypolt	20,334	58.5
Democratic	Steven Shaffer	14,423	41.5
Total votes		34,757	100.0
Republican hold			

== SD 15 ==
2010 West Virginia SD 15 general election
Party	Candidate	Votes	%
Democratic	Walt Helmick	19,192	57.0
Republican	Jeremy Bauserman	14,470	43.0
Total votes		33,662	100.0
Democratic hold			

== SD 16 ==
2010 West Virginia SD 16 general election
Party	Candidate	Votes	%
Democratic	John Unger	18,800	50.4
Republican	Craig Blair	18,482	49.6
Total votes		37,282	100.0
Democratic hold			

== SD 17 ==
2010 West Virginia SD 17 general election
Party	Candidate	Votes	%
Democratic	Brooks McCabe	32,085	55.9
Republican	Charles Minimah	21,715	37.8
Mountain	David Hall	3,628	6.3
Total votes		57,428	100.0
Democratic hold			

== See also ==
- 2010 United States Senate election in West Virginia
- 2010 United States House of Representatives elections in West Virginia
