= Mountain Party =

West Virginia affiliate of the Green Party

- Chair: Dylan Parsons
- Vice Chair: Alexa Hartsock
- Secretary: Paige Reiring
- Treasurer: Joshua Craig
- Founder: Denise Giardina; Frank Young
- Founded: May 8, 2000; 26 years ago
- Headquarters: P.O. Box 805; New Martinsville, WV 26155
- Membership (2026): ▲2,788
- Ideology: Green politics Eco-socialism; Anti-Zionism; Communism
- Political position: Left-wing to far-left
- National affiliation: Green Party of the United States
- Colors: Evergreen
- West Virginia Senate: 0 / 34
- West Virginia House of Delegates: 0 / 100

Website
- www.mountainpartywv.net

The Mountain Party (also known as the West Virginia Green Party and the West Virginia Workers’ Party) is a political party in West Virginia affiliated with the Green Party of the United States.

It is an eco-socialist and anti-Zionist party whose party platform primarily focuses on workers' democracy, social justice, an eco-socialist Green New Deal, and the abolition of capitalism.

== History ==
The Mountain Party was created largely in response to the conservative tilt of the West Virginia Democratic Party, and was born out of Denise Giardina's gubernatorial campaign in 2000.

Today, the party is chaired by Dylan Parsons.

=== Prominent campaigns ===
In 2016, the party ran former state senator Charlotte Pritt for Governor of West Virginia. This led to growth for the party. She received nearly 6% of the vote, the highest ever for a Mountain Party gubernatorial candidate.

In 2018, the Mountain Party elected Betsy Orndoff-Sayers as Mayor of Wardensville winning 55.7% of the vote and was re-elected without a challenger in 2022.

In 2022, House of Delegates candidate Dylan Parsons was endorsed by two members of the Morgantown City Council, former Democratic nominees for Congress Mike Manypenny and Sue Thorn, Conservation District Supervisor and Executive Director of the West Virginia Farmers Market Association Holly Morgan, and the organization WV Can't Wait.

In 2024, Wardensville mayor Betsy Orndoff-Sayers sought election to the West Virginia Senate. Orndoff-Sayers received the endorsement of Planned Parenthood Votes South Atlantic and WV Can’t Wait.

In 2026, the Mountain Party nominated Paige Reiring for House of Delegates in district 79. Reiring received the endorsement of WV Can't Wait. The party also endorsed Mountain Party member Joshua Craig in his bid for Moundsville City Council, and union organizer and independent candidate for House of Delegates Dave Cantrell.

== Platform ==
The current Mountain Party platform was formally adopted on February 27, 2021, and can be found in its entirety on the party website.

=== Democratic system ===
The Mountain Party seeks to allow initiative and referendum processes in West Virginia, which the state does not currently provide, and to allow public employees to run for office. The party also supports the creation of citizen assemblies as a means to open legislative participation to all constituents.

The Mountain Party also seeks to allow recall elections at every level of government, ban corporate donations to candidates, enable non-citizen, permanent residents to vote in municipal elections, enact ranked-choice voting, and require all employers to allow workers paid time off to vote.

The Mountain Party opposes legislation that wields penalties against supporters of the Boycott, Divestment, and Sanctions movement.

=== Social policy ===
The Mountain Party supports equal rights for all persons regardless of their sex, gender identity, or sexual orientation. The party supports a ban on conversion therapy and legislation to outlaw discrimination based on gender identity or expression. The Mountain Party supports reparations to black people, indigenous people, and people of color for what it describes as "the past four hundred plus years of genocide, slavery, land-loss, destruction of original identity, and the stark disparities which haunt the present."

The Mountain Party seeks to expand and protect women's rights to participate in society free from sexual harassment and job and wage discrimination. The party seeks to ensure that access to birth control, family planning resources, and abortion remains available.

The Mountain Party seeks to support persons with disabilities by protecting their rights, providing access to healthcare, and enforcing the Americans with Disabilities Act. Additionally, the party supports fully funding residential, community-based services and public sector service coordinators.

The Mountain Party seeks to abolish the use of eminent domain to take over land for use by private corporations. The party also seeks to ends homelessness by constructing and maintaining sufficient public housing, placing a moratorium on home foreclosures and evictions, prohibiting compulsory work service for residents of public housing, providing job training and support services for homeless people, and replacing the shelter system with apartments.

The Mountain Party seeks to end high-stakes testing and eliminate the standardized testing model. The party seeks to fully fund full-day and developmentally appropriate universal pre-kindergarten and all state colleges and universities. The party supports student democratic decision-making in curriculum, administration, and conflict resolution within each school.

=== Economic policy ===
The Mountain Party seeks to allow local governments to establish a higher minimum wage for all workers, increase and enforce a statewide living wage that is adjusted annually for inflation, increase wages for tipped workers, and abolish unpaid internships. The party supports the rights of workers to in engage in collective action and self-representation.

The Mountain Party supports economic democracy through workers' direct control over the means of production.

== Currently elected officials ==
Betsy Orndoff-Sayers has been the Mountain (Green Party) affiliated Mayor of Wardensville, West Virginia since 2018 and was re-elected in 2022.

The Mountain Party has consistently maintained a number of officeholders for non-partisan offices, despite not being nominated by the party membership. According to the Green Party of the United States elections database, there are two non-partisan officeholders registered with the Mountain Party serving as Conservation District Supervisors.

== Election results ==
=== President ===
Year	Nominee	Votes	Percent
2024	Jill Stein	2,531	0.33%
2020	Howie Hawkins	2,599	0.33%
2016	Jill Stein	8,075	1.13%
2012	Jill Stein	4,406	0.66%
2008	Cynthia McKinney	2,355	0.33%

=== Governor ===
Year	Nominee	Votes	Percent
2024	Chase Linko-Looper	9,596	1.30%
2020	Daniel Lutz	11,296	1.47%
2016	Charlotte Pritt	42,068	5.89%
2012	Jesse Johnson	16,787	2.53%
2011	Bob Henry Baber	6,083	2.02%
2008	Jesse Johnson	31,486	4.46%
2004	Jesse Johnson	18,430	2.48%
2000	Denise Giardina	10,416	1.61%

=== Legislature ===
West Virginia Senate			West Virginia House of Delegates	
Year	Total votes	Total Percent	Year	Total votes
2000			2000	
2002	1,173	missing	2002	3,165
2004	2,048	missing	2004	no candidates
2006	no candidates		2006	365
2008	2,682	0.37%	2008	5,606
2010	3,628	0.74% (Note: Percentage calculated excluding vote total from additional unexpired election for District 10)	2010	2,791
2012	no candidates		2012	5,994
2014	1,221	0.28%	2014	3,720
2016	1,404	0.20% (Note: Percentage calculated excluding vote total from additional unexpired election for District 3)	2016	3,031
2018	no candidates		2018	3,365
2020	10,324	1.34%	2020	3,228
2022	no candidates		2022	641
2024	5,551	0.83%	2024	no candidates
