= Harold Sigler =

American politician

Member of the West Virginia House of Delegates from the 35th district
- In office 2010–2012

Personal details
- Party: Republican
- Education: West Virginia Institute of Technology

Harold "Pete" Sigler is an American politician from West Virginia. He is a Republican and represented District 35 in the West Virginia House of Delegates.

Sigler worked as a coal miner. Sigler ran against Randy White for 11th district for the West Virginia Senate in 2006.
