= 1st West Virginia legislature =

1st West Virginia Legislature
←	Restored Government of Virginia	2nd	→

Overview
- Legislative body: West Virginia Legislature
- Term: June 20, 1863 – December 11, 1863
- Governor: Arthur I. Boreman

House of Delegates
- Members: 51 delegates
- Speaker: Spicer Patrick

Senate
- Members: 20 senators
- President: John M. Phelps

The first state legislature of West Virginia convened in Wheeling from June 20, 1863, to December 11, 1863, after the adoption of the West Virginia Constitution which was drafted during the first two years of the Civil War.

== Apportionment ==
Legend
- District 1
- District 2
- District 3
- District 4
- District 5
- District 6
- District 7
- District 8
- District 9
- District 10
- District 11
- 1 delegate
- 2 delegates
- 3 delegates
- Thick black lines: State and district boundaries
- Thin gray lines: County boundaries
- Dashed black lines: Planned district and state boundaries
- Dashed red lines: Counties with rotating member apportionment

The 1863 West Virginia Constitution established the creation of nine senatorial districts, each sending two senators to the state legislature. Additionally, the constitution called for the creation of two other senatorial districts containing counties in northern Virginia assuming they joined the state. For the House of Delegates, the constitution outlined six delegate districts each sending one or two delegates to the House, with another planned for counties in northern Virginia. Every other county was apportioned one to three delegates. The Senate member count was set to be between eighteen and twenty-two, and between forty-seven and fifty-two for the House of Delegates, depending on how many Virginian counties were absorbed into the state.

West Virginia's Senate districts as defined in the 1863 Constitution

West Virginia's Delegate districts as defined in the 1863 Constitution

House of Delegate apportionment as defined in the 1863 Constitution

== Members of the Senate ==
President of the West Virginia Senate: John M. Phelps from Mason County

- District 1 (Hancock, Brooke, and Ohio)
  - John H. Atkinson
  - Chester D. Hubbard
- District 2 (Marshall, Wetzel, and Marion)
  - James Burley
  - Aaron Hawkins
- District 3 (Monongalia, Preston, and Taylor)
  - John J. Brown
  - Edward C. Bunker
- District 4 (Pleasants, Tyler, Ritchie, Doddridge, and Harrison)
  - Daniel Haymond
  - Edwin Maxwell
- District 5 (Wood, Jackson, Wirt, Roane, Calhoun, and Gilmer)
  - Edward S. Mahon
  - William E. Stevenson
- District 6 (Barbour, Tucker, Lewis, Braxton, Upshur, and Randolph)
  - D. D. T. Farnsworth
  - William D. Rollyson
- District 7 (Mason, Putnam, Kanawha, Clay, and Nicholas)
  - Greenbury Slack
- District 8 (Cabell, Wayne, Boone, Logan, Wyoming, Mercer, and McDowell)
  - John B. Brown
  - William H. Copley
- District 9 (Webster, Pocahontas, Fayette, Raleigh, Greenbrier, and Monroe)
  - Thomas K. McCann
  - Samuel Young
  - John M. Phelps
- District 10 (Planned: Pendleton, Hardy, Hampshire, and Morgan)
  - Aaron Bechtol
  - James Carskadon
- District 11 (Planned: Frederick, Berkeley, and Jefferson)

== Members of the House of Delegates ==
Speaker of the West Virginia House of Delegates: Spicer Patrick

=== Members by delegate districts ===
- District 1 (Pleasants and Wood, 2 members)
  - Horatio N. Crooks (Wood)
  - Peter G. Van Winkle (Wood)
- District 2 (Calhoun and Gilmer)
  - William T. Wiant (Gilmer)
- District 3 (Clay and Nicholas)
  - Anthony Rader (Nicholas)
- District 4 (Webster and Pocahontas)
  - Benoni Griffin (Pocahontas)
- District 5 (Tucker and Randolph)
  - Cyrus Kittle (Randolph)
- District 6 (McDowell, Wyoming, and Raleigh)
  - W. S. Dunbar (Raleigh)
- District 7 (Planned: Morgan and Berkeley, 2 members)
  - Joseph S. Wheat (Morgan)
- Greenbrier and Monroe: (3 members, county delegate count in rotation)
  - John C. Gillilan (Greenbrier)
  - Andrew W. Mann (Greenbrier)
  - Lewis Ballard (Monroe)

=== Members by county ===
- Barbour: Joseph Teter Jr.
- Boone: Robert Hager
- Braxton: Felix Sutton
- Brooke: H. W. Crothers
- Cabell: Edward D. Wright
- Doddridge: Ephraim Bee
- Frederick (Planned, 2 members)
- Hampshire:
  - James I. Barrick
  - George W. Sheetz
- Hancock: William L. Crawford
- Hardy: John Michael
- Harrison:
  - Nathan Goff Sr.
  - Soloman S. Fleming
- Jackson: David J. Keeney
- Jefferson (Planned, 2 members)
- Kanawha:
  - Spicer Patrick
  - Lewis Ruffner
- Lewis: Perry M. Hale
- Logan: James H. Hinchman
- Marion:
  - Isaac Holman
  - John S. Barnes
- Marshall:
  - Michael Dunn
  - Joseph Turner
- Mason: Lewis Bumgardner
- Mercer: Thomas Little
- Monongalia:
  - Leroy Kramer
  - John B. Lough
- Ohio:
  - Daniel Lamb
  - Andrew F. Ross
  - W. W. Shriver
- Pendleton: John Boggs
- Preston:
  - James C. McGrew
  - William B. Zinn
- Putnam: George C. Bowyer
- Ritchie: S. R. Dawson
- Roane: J. M. McWhorter
- Taylor: L. E. Davidson
- Tyler: Daniel Sweeny
- Upshur: Jacob Teter
- Wayne: Thomas Couley
- Wetzel: S. I. Robinson
- Wirt: Alfred Foster

== Accomplishments ==
204 bills were passed by the legislature in its first term, including bills to admit Berkeley and Jefferson counties into the state.

== See also ==
- List of West Virginia state legislatures
- Wheeling Convention
