= Martha Yeager Walker =

American politician from West Virginia

Martha Yeager Walker (born May 15, 1940) is a former politician in West Virginia who served in the West Virginia House of Delegates from 1990 to 1993 and the West Virginia Senate from 1993 to 2000. A Democrat, she represented Kanawha County.

James Herndon Yeager and Ardenia Stuck Yeager were her parents. She received a Bachelor of Science degree from West Virginia University. She married H. Jarrett Walker and they had three children and several grandchildren. In 2000, she was a candidate for a seat in the U.S. House of Representatives. She served on the Public Service Commission of West Virginia. She later served as Secretary of West Virginia's Department of Health and Human Resources.
