= 2000 West Virginia gubernatorial election =

- November 7, 2000
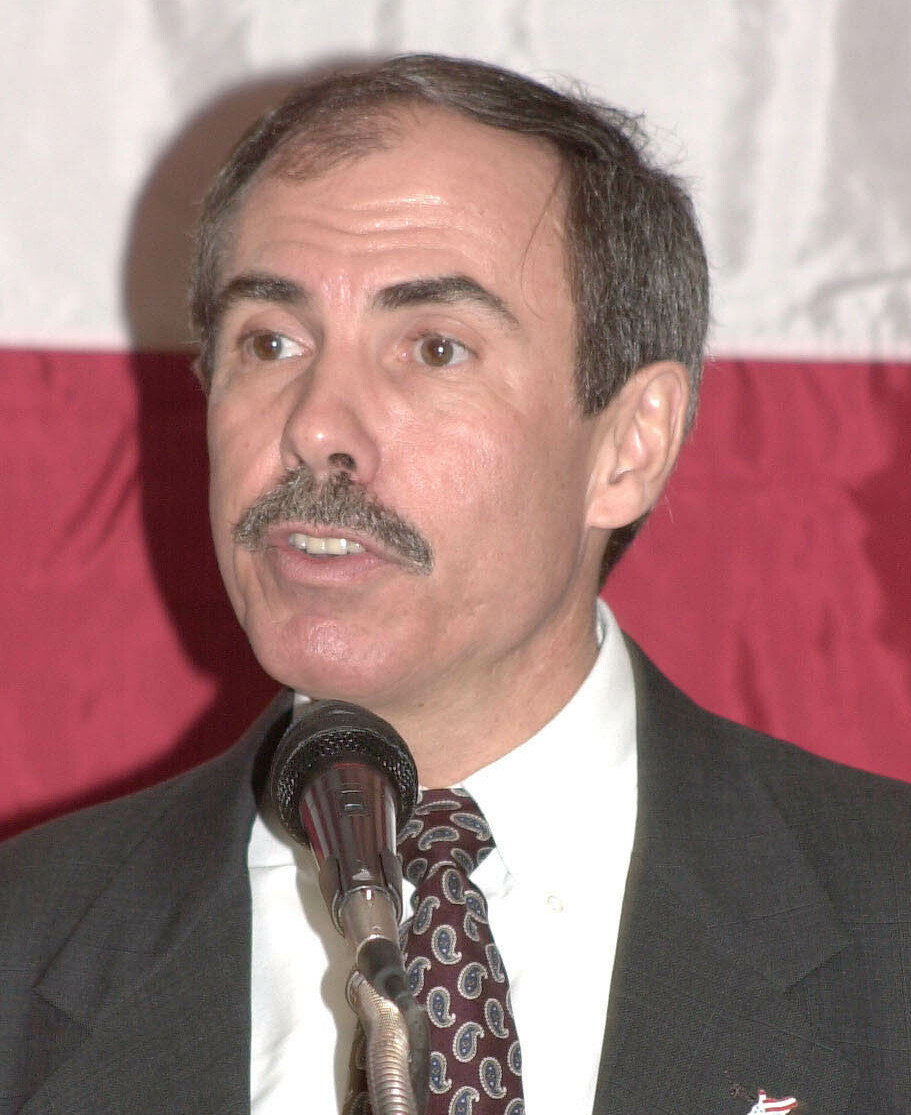

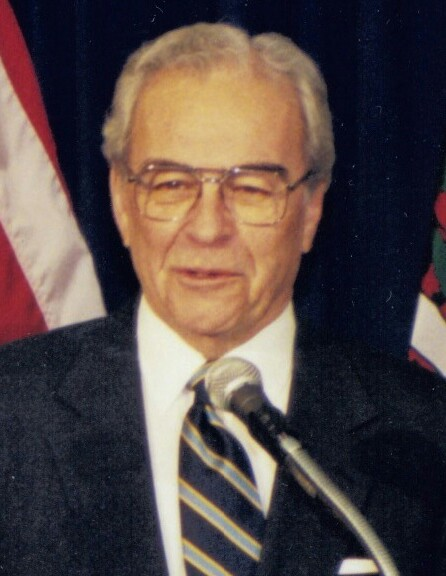
Nominee	Bob Wise	Cecil Underwood
Party	Democratic	Republican
Popular vote	324,822	305,926
Percentage	50.12%	47.21%
- County results Wise: 40–50% 50–60% 60–70% Underwood: 40–50% 50–60% 60–70% 70–80%
Governor before election
Cecil Underwood
Republican
Elected Governor
Bob Wise
Democratic

The 2000 West Virginia gubernatorial election took place on November 7, 2000. Republican incumbent Cecil Underwood ran for re-election to a second consecutive term in office but was defeated by Democratic U.S. representative Bob Wise. As of 2026, this is the last time in which an incumbent West Virginia governor lost re-election.

== Republican primary ==
=== Candidates ===
- Larry Eugene Butcher
- Donna H. McCase
- Joseph Oliverio
- Cecil H. Underwood, incumbent governor since 1997 (Note: Underwood served a prior term as governor from 1957 to 1961.)

=== Results ===
Underwood was easily re-nominated in the Republican primary, defeating three other candidates by a wide margin.

Republican primary results
Party	Candidate	Votes	%
Republican	Cecil Underwood (incumbent)	87,190	80.88%
Republican	Joseph Oliverio	11,590	10.75%
Republican	Donna H. McCase	5,902	4.48%
Republican	Larry Eugene Butcher	3,117	2.89%
Total votes		107,799	100.0

== Democratic primary ==
=== Candidates ===
- Jim Lees, attorney and 1996 candidate for governor
- Bob Wise, U.S. representative from Clendenin

=== Results ===
Democratic primary results
Party	Candidate	Votes	%
Democratic	Bob Wise	174,292	63.13%
Democratic	Jim Lees	101,774	36.87%
Total votes		276,066	100.0

== General election ==
=== Candidates ===
- Randall Ashelman (Natural Law)
- Denise Giardina, author and activist (Mountain)
- Bob Myers (Libertarian)
- Cecil H. Underwood, incumbent governor since 1997 (Note: Underwood served a prior term as governor from 1957 to 1961.) (Republican)
- Bob Wise, U.S. representative from Clendenin (Democratic)

=== Debates ===
- Complete video of debate, October 18, 2000

=== Polling ===
Poll source	Date(s)	Sample size	Margin of error	Cecil Underwood (R)	Bob Wise (D)	Other / undecided (Note: Calculated by taking the difference of 100% and all other candidates combined.)
Harris Insights & Analytics	November 3, 2000	1,691	—	45%	49%	6%
Rasmussen Reports	November 2, 2000	1,066	—	43%	48%	9%
Rasmussen Reports	October 18, 2000	1,036	—	41%	47%	12%

=== Results ===
West Virginia gubernatorial election, 2000
Party	Candidate	Votes	%	±%
Democratic	Bob Wise	324,822	50.12%	+4.32%
Republican	Cecil Underwood (incumbent)	305,926	47.21%	−4.42%
Mountain	Denise Giardina	10,416	1.61%	+1.61%
Libertarian	Bob Myers	5,548	0.86%	−1.71%
Natural Law	Randall Ashelman	1,301	0.20%	+0.20%
Write-in		34	0.01%	N/A
Total votes		648,047	100.00%	N/A
Democratic gain from Republican				

==== By county ====
County	Bob Wise Democratic		Cecil Underwood Republican		Denise Giardina Mountain		Various candidates Other parties		Margin		Total
County	#	%	#	%	#	%	#	%	#	%	Total
Barbour	3,052	50.27%	2,900	47.77%	51	0.84%	68	1.12%	152	2.50%	6,071
Berkeley	10,045	43.80%	12,221	53.29%	283	1.23%	384	1.67%	−2,176	−9.49%	22,933
Boone	6,193	67.36%	2,865	31.16%	90	0.98%	46	0.50%	3,328	36.20%	9,194
Braxton	3,419	64.24%	1,848	34.72%	18	0.34%	37	0.70%	1,571	29.52%	5,322
Brooke	4,908	52.04%	4,317	45.77%	105	1.11%	102	1.08%	591	6.27%	9,432
Cabell	15,190	47.14%	15,661	48.60%	803	2.49%	572	1.77%	−471	−1.46%	32,226
Calhoun	1,411	53.61%	1,124	42.71%	77	2.93%	20	0.76%	287	10.90%	2,632
Clay	2,115	58.44%	1,420	39.24%	47	1.30%	37	1.02%	695	19.20%	3,619
Doddridge	906	31.85%	1,878	66.01%	35	1.23%	26	0.91%	−972	−34.17%	2,845
Fayette	8,746	59.60%	5,520	37.62%	275	1.87%	133	0.91%	3,226	21.98%	14,674
Gilmer	1,418	51.68%	1,231	44.86%	68	2.48%	27	0.98%	187	6.81%	2,744
Grant	957	21.41%	3,453	77.25%	24	0.54%	36	0.81%	−2,496	−55.84%	4,470
Greenbrier	5,896	46.04%	6,443	50.31%	311	2.43%	156	1.22%	−547	−4.27%	12,806
Hampshire	2,245	36.97%	3,648	60.08%	99	1.63%	80	1.32%	−1,403	−23.11%	6,072
Hancock	6,926	53.98%	5,660	44.11%	96	0.75%	149	1.16%	1,266	9.87%	12,831
Hardy	1,377	30.99%	2,991	67.30%	32	0.72%	44	0.99%	−1,614	−36.32%	4,444
Harrison	14,417	54.23%	11,606	43.66%	283	1.06%	279	1.05%	2,811	10.57%	26,585
Jackson	6,155	53.33%	5,157	44.68%	162	1.40%	68	0.59%	998	8.65%	11,542
Jefferson	6,772	47.62%	6,598	46.40%	427	3.00%	424	2.98%	174	1.22%	14,221
Kanawha	43,312	56.54%	30,571	39.91%	2,172	2.84%	554	0.72%	12,741	16.63%	76,609
Lewis	3,368	54.61%	2,686	43.55%	56	0.91%	57	0.92%	682	11.06%	6,167
Lincoln	4,498	60.01%	2,841	37.91%	106	1.41%	50	0.67%	1,657	22.11%	7,495
Logan	8,692	59.03%	5,889	39.99%	45	0.31%	99	0.67%	2,803	19.04%	14,725
Marion	13,078	57.59%	9,207	40.55%	207	0.91%	216	0.95%	3,871	17.05%	22,708
Marshall	6,832	50.44%	6,406	47.30%	156	1.15%	150	1.11%	426	3.15%	13,544
Mason	6,569	58.18%	4,512	39.96%	99	0.88%	110	0.97%	2,057	18.22%	11,290
McDowell	3,723	50.63%	3,570	48.55%	35	0.48%	26	0.35%	153	2.08%	7,354
Mercer	8,728	46.28%	9,786	51.89%	207	1.10%	137	0.73%	−1,058	−5.61%	18,858
Mineral	4,022	41.20%	5,525	56.60%	84	0.86%	131	1.34%	−1,503	−15.40%	9,762
Mingo	5,737	56.67%	4,286	42.34%	40	0.40%	61	0.60%	1,451	14.33%	10,124
Monongalia	13,089	48.09%	12,673	46.56%	916	3.37%	542	1.99%	416	1.53%	27,220
Monroe	2,301	44.70%	2,721	52.86%	77	1.50%	49	0.95%	−420	−8.16%	5,148
Morgan	2,219	39.38%	3,240	57.50%	60	1.06%	116	2.06%	−1,021	−18.12%	5,635
Nicholas	5,144	59.45%	3,366	38.90%	78	0.90%	64	0.74%	1,778	20.55%	8,652
Ohio	7,833	43.53%	9,690	53.85%	235	1.31%	238	1.32%	−1,857	−10.32%	17,996
Pendleton	1,285	40.66%	1,834	58.04%	22	0.70%	19	0.60%	−549	−17.37%	3,160
Pleasants	1,286	39.99%	1,886	58.64%	16	0.50%	28	0.87%	−600	−18.66%	3,216
Pocahontas	1,654	47.80%	1,692	48.90%	70	2.02%	44	1.27%	−38	−1.10%	3,460
Preston	3,920	37.53%	6,231	59.66%	177	1.69%	117	1.12%	−2,311	−22.13%	10,445
Putnam	9,991	49.25%	9,669	47.67%	467	2.30%	158	0.78%	322	1.59%	20,285
Raleigh	11,435	47.44%	12,072	50.09%	408	1.69%	187	0.78%	−637	−2.64%	24,102
Randolph	5,219	54.58%	4,071	42.57%	173	1.81%	99	1.04%	1,148	12.01%	9,562
Ritchie	1,210	31.58%	2,524	65.88%	64	1.67%	33	0.86%	−1,314	−34.30%	3,831
Roane	2,988	52.66%	2,505	44.15%	156	2.75%	25	0.44%	483	8.51%	5,674
Summers	2,145	45.35%	2,459	51.99%	87	1.84%	39	0.82%	−314	−6.64%	4,730
Taylor	2,991	51.01%	2,690	45.88%	34	0.58%	148	2.52%	301	5.13%	5,863
Tucker	1,661	49.21%	1,630	48.30%	44	1.30%	40	1.19%	31	0.92%	3,375
Tyler	960	24.30%	2,921	73.95%	34	0.86%	35	0.89%	−1,961	−49.65%	3,950
Upshur	3,669	44.81%	4,333	52.93%	109	1.33%	76	0.93%	−664	−8.11%	8,187
Wayne	8,787	54.23%	7,103	43.83%	162	1.00%	152	0.94%	1,684	10.39%	16,204
Webster	2,204	66.11%	1,084	32.51%	25	0.75%	21	0.63%	1,120	33.59%	3,334
Wetzel	2,962	46.62%	3,292	51.82%	63	0.99%	36	0.57%	−330	−5.19%	6,353
Wirt	1,099	46.04%	1,261	52.83%	13	0.54%	14	0.59%	−162	−6.79%	2,387
Wood	13,673	40.44%	19,474	57.59%	380	1.12%	286	0.85%	−5,801	−17.16%	33,813
Wyoming	4,390	55.81%	3,385	43.03%	53	0.67%	38	0.48%	1,005	12.78%	7,866
Totals	324,822	50.15%	305,626	47.18%	10,416	1.61%	6,883	1.06%	19,196	2.96%	647,747

==== Counties that flipped from Republican to Democratic ====
- Barbour (largest city: Philippi)
- Boone (largest city: Madison)
- Calhoun (largest city: Grantsville)
- Gilmer (largest city: Glenville)
- Jackson (largest city: Ravenswood)
- Lewis (largest city: Weston)
- Mason (largest city: Point Pleasant)
- Randolph (largest city: Elkins)
- Roane (largest city: Spencer)
- Taylor (largest city: Grafton)
- Harrison (largest city: Clarksburg)
- Marion (largest city: Fairmont)
- Putnam (largest municipality: Hurricane)
