= Jon Blair Hunter =

American politician (born 1938)

Member of the West Virginia Senate from the 14th district
- In office 1997–2009

Personal details
- Born: December 25, 1938 (age 87) Richwood, West Virginia, U.S.
- Party: Democratic
- Spouse: Judy Raught
- Education: University of Wisconsin

Jon Blair Hunter (born December 25, 1938) was a Democratic West Virginia state senator from the 14th district, which represents Barbour County, Preston County, Taylor County, Tucker County and parts of Grant County and Monongalia County. He served from 1996 until 2008. As a legislator he was a voice for environmental issues and has sponsored legislation to stop Mountain Top Removal mining in West Virginia.

He retired having not sought re-election in 2008.
