= William R. Sharpe Jr. =

American politician

William Richard Sharpe Jr.

Member of the West Virginia Senate from the 12th district
- In office December 1, 1992 – December 1, 2008
- Preceded by: Jae Spears
- Succeeded by: Doug Facemire

Member of the West Virginia Senate from the 13th district
- In office December 1, 1984 – December 1, 1992
- Preceded by: Jean Scott Chace
- Succeeded by: Joe Manchin
- In office December 1, 1960 – December 1, 1980
- Preceded by: Raymond J. Vassar
- Succeeded by: Jean Scott Chace

Personal details
- Born: William Richard Sharpe Jr. October 28, 1928 Clarksburg, West Virginia
- Died: February 15, 2009 (aged 80) Weston, West Virginia
- Party: Democratic
- Spouse: Mary Pauline Lester
- Education: Victory High School, West Virginia University
- Occupation: Master electrician, Electrical engineer, Electrical contractor

William Richard Sharpe Jr. (October 28, 1928 – February 16, 2009) was a Democratic member of the West Virginia Senate, representing the 12th district. He was first elected in 1960 and served until 1980. From 1972 to 1980 he served as Majority Whip. He was elected again in 1984 and in 1990 was appointed Senate President Pro Tempore. He is the longest-serving State Senator in West Virginia history, with a career of over 44 years.

In 1994, West Virginia Department of Health and Human Resources opened a new 150 bed acute care psychiatric facility to replace the old Weston State Hospital. The new facility was named William R. Sharpe Jr. Hospital. In 2000 a new Civil Air Patrol facility was built at Charleston's Yeager Airport and it too was named in Sharpe's honor.

In January 2007, Sharpe underwent a 10-hour surgery to treat what doctors called a giant aneurysm. In 2008, Sharpe opted not to seek another term as State Senator. His term expired at the end of December 2008. Sharpe died February 16, 2009.
