= Billy Wayne Bailey =

American politician (1957–2023)

Member of the West Virginia Senate from the 9th district
- In office January 4, 1991 – December 1, 2008
- Preceded by: Juliet Walker Rundle
- Succeeded by: Richard Browning

Personal details
- Born: William Wayne Bailey Jr. June 7, 1957 Bluefield, West Virginia, U.S.
- Died: May 14, 2023 (aged 65)
- Party: Democratic
- Spouse(s): Barbara Jo Thomas; Allison N. Hughart
- Occupation: businessman, cattle farmer, salesman

Military service
- Allegiance: United States
- Branch/service: West Virginia National Guard

William Wayne Bailey Jr. (June 7, 1957 – May 14, 2023) was an American politician who served as a Democratic member of the West Virginia Senate, representing the 9th district from his appointment in January 1991 until leaving office in 2009. He later served as the Deputy Secretary of the West Virginia Department of Veterans Assistance.

Bailey decided to not seek re-election to the WV Senate in 2008 and instead ran an unsuccessful primary campaign for the WV Secretary of State. He resided in Cabell County.

Bailey died on May 14, 2023, at the age of 65.
