= Shirley Love (politician) =

American politician (1933–2020)

Member of the West Virginia House of Delegates from the 32nd district
- In office 2017–2019

Member of the West Virginia Senate from the 11th district
- In office 1994–2008

Personal details
- Born: May 15, 1933 Oak Hill, West Virginia, U.S.
- Died: July 17, 2020 (aged 87) Oak Hill, West Virginia, U.S.
- Party: Democratic

Shirley D. Love (May 15, 1933 – July 17, 2020) was an American politician and broadcast journalist who served as a member of both chambers of the West Virginia Legislature.

== Career ==
Love served as a member of the West Virginia House of Delegates, representing the 32nd District from 2017 until 2019. He unsuccessfully ran in the Democratic primary for U.S. House of Representatives in the 2018, losing the 3rd District primary to Richard Ojeda.

He was a member of the West Virginia Senate representing the 11th district from 1994 until 2008. Love was a broadcast journalist, having spent the majority of his career with WOAY-TV in Oak Hill, West Virginia. Love was also a wrestling announcer and host for NWA Saturday Night Wrestling On WOAY-TV.
