= Edwin Bowman =

American politician (born 1946)

Member of the West Virginia Senate from the 1st district
- In office December 1, 1994 – December 1, 2010
- Succeeded by: Orphy Klempa

Personal details
- Born: December 20, 1946 (age 79) Baltimore, Maryland
- Party: Democratic
- Spouse: Kathy Mrvos

Edwin Bowman is a former Democratic member of the West Virginia Senate, representing the 1st District from 1994 to 2010.
