= Joseph M. Minard =

American politician (1932–2022)

- Minard in 2004

Member of the West Virginia Senate from the 12th district
- In office December 1, 1998 – January 9, 2013
- Preceded by: Rebecca I. White
- Succeeded by: Samuel J. Cann, Sr.

Member of the West Virginia Senate from the 13th district
- In office December 1, 1990 – December 1, 1994
- Preceded by: Jay Wolfe
- Succeeded by: Mike Oliverio

Personal details
- Born: January 5, 1932 Clarksburg, West Virginia
- Died: January 17, 2022 (aged 90)
- Party: Democratic
- Education: West Virginia University
- Occupation: Businessman

Military service
- Allegiance: United States
- Branch/service: United States Army

Joseph M. Minard (January 5, 1932 – January 17, 2022) was an American politician from West Virginia. A Democrat, he was a member of the West Virginia Senate, representing the 12th district from 1990 until 1994, and again from 1998 until 2013. He was a Delegate in the West Virginia House of Delegates from his appointment in 1983 through 1990. Minard was also the President Pro Tempore of the West Virginia Senate. He died on January 17, 2022, at the age of 90.
