= Dan Foster (politician) =

American politician (born 1948)

Member of the West Virginia Senate from the 17th district
- In office December 1, 2004 – December 1, 2012
- Preceded by: Larry L. Rowe
- Succeeded by: Corey Palumbo

Member of the West Virginia House of Delegates from the 30th district
- In office December 1, 2002 – December 1, 2004

Personal details
- Born: January 31, 1948 (age 78) Oak Ridge, Tennessee, U. S.
- Party: Democratic
- Spouse: Kathy Sylvester Foster
- Education: Harvard University; Stanford University School of Medicine
- Profession: surgeon, physician advisor

Daniel Stevenson Foster (born January 31, 1948) was a Democratic member of the West Virginia Senate, representing the 17th District from 2004 through 2012. He was previously a member of the West Virginia House of Delegates from 2002 through 2004.
