= Roman Prezioso =

American politician

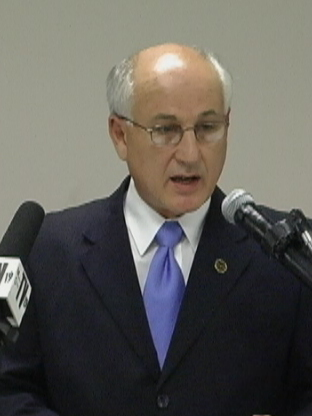

Minority Leader of the West Virginia Senate
- In office January 11, 2017 – December 1, 2020
- Preceded by: Jeff Kessler
- Succeeded by: Stephen Baldwin

Member of the West Virginia Senate from the 13th district
- In office December 1, 1996 – December 1, 2020 Serving with Bob Beach
- Preceded by: Joe Manchin
- Succeeded by: Mike Caputo

Member of the West Virginia House of Delegates from the 43rd district
- In office December 1, 1992 – December 1, 1996
- Preceded by: Constituency established
- Succeeded by: ???

Member of the West Virginia House of Delegates from the 31st district
- In office December 1, 1988 – December 1, 1992
- Preceded by: ???
- Succeeded by: Nelson Sorah

Personal details
- Born: June 29, 1949 (age 77)
- Party: Democratic
- Spouse: Deborah Haught
- Children: 1
- Education: Marshall University; Fairmont State University (BA); West Virginia University, Morgantown (MS)

Roman W. Prezioso, Jr. (born June 29, 1949) is an American politician and former West Virginia state senator representing the 13th district which comprises parts of Marion and Monongalia counties. He is a member of the Democratic Party.

== Background ==
Roman Prezioso was born on June 29, 1949. He had been an educator and administrator prior to his election to public office. He lives in Fairmont, West Virginia.

Prezioso went to Monongah High School with Alabama football coach Nick Saban.

== Service ==
Prior to his election to the West Virginia Senate, he was a delegate in the West Virginia House of Delegates from 1988 to 1996. He served in the Senate from 1996 to 2020.

== Committee memberships ==
Standing Committees

- Banking and Insurance
- Economic Development
- Finance
- Health and Human Resources Chair
- Labor
- Rules
- Natural Resources

Interim committees

- Legislative Intern Committee Chair
- Select Committee A - Flooding and Railroad Issues Chair
- Joint Committee on Technology Chair
- Finance Subcommittee A
- Joint Commission on Economic Development
- Select Committee C - Pharmaceutical Availability and Affordability
- Joint Standing Committee on Finance
- Legislative Rule-Making Review Committee

== See also ==
- List of members of the 79th West Virginia Senate

West Virginia Senate
Preceded by Jeff Kessler	Minority Leader of the West Virginia Senate; 2017–2020	Succeeded by Stephen Baldwin
