= Vic Sprouse =

American politician (born 1968)

Vic Sprouse (born April 29, 1968) is an American Republican politician who formerly served as Senate Minority Leader in the West Virginia State Senate.

Born in Altoona, Pennsylvania, Sprouse graduated from Pennsylvania State University. He was first elected to the West Virginia House of Delegates 30th district in 1994 and was subsequently elected to the West Virginia Senate from Kanawha County in 1996 and re-elected in 2000 and 2004. During his period in the State Senate he was minority leader from 1998 to 2007. He graduated as a chemical engineer from Penn State University. He owned several Curves fitness centers in the Charleston area as well as a political and marketing firm.

Sprouse is the Founder and former CEO of Brickhouse Cardio Club, Inc. a Charleston, West Virginia–based fitness studio and franchise specializing in fitness studios offering group classes.

Sprouse is currently the Federal Funds and Grants Director at the West Virginia Department of Economic Development.

== See also ==
- List of members of the 77th West Virginia Senate

West Virginia House of Delegates
Preceded by Multi-member district	Member of the West Virginia House of Delegates from the 30th district 1994–1996	Succeeded by Multi-member district
West Virginia Senate
Preceded by David Grubb	Member of the West Virginia Senate from the 8th district 1996–2008	Succeeded by Corey Palumbo
Preceded by Jack Buckalew	Minority Leader of the West Virginia Senate; 1998–2007	Succeeded by Don Caruth
