= Truman Chafin =

American politician

H. Truman Chafin

Member of the West Virginia Senate from the 6th district
- In office December 1, 1982 – December 1, 2014
- Preceded by: Lafe P. Ward
- Succeeded by: Mark R. Maynard

Personal details
- Born: July 10, 1945 (age 81) Williamson, West Virginia, U.S.
- Party: Democratic
- Spouse(s): Letitia Neese (m. 2000); Gretchen Lewis (m. 1990; div. 1995)
- Education: Marshall University (B.B.A.); Michigan State University College of Law (J.D.)
- Occupation: Attorney

Harry Truman Chafin (born July 10, 1945) is a former Democratic member of the West Virginia Senate, representing the 6th district from 1982 to 2014. He served as Majority Leader from 1998 to 2010. He is married to Letitia Neese Chafin and has three daughters, Lizzie, Carah, and Carly. Lizzie is the daughter of Chafin's ex-wife and former law partner, Gretchen Lewis.

== Electoral history ==
West Virginia's 6th senatorial district: Results 1982–2014
Year	Democrat	Votes	%	Republican	Votes	%
1982	H. Truman Chafin	18,673	100%	No candidate		
1986	H. Truman Chafin	11,401	100%	No candidate		
1990	H. Truman Chafin	9,652	69%	Richard Bass	4,351	31%
1994	H. Truman Chafin	10,295	100%	No candidate		
1998	H. Truman Chafin	10,669	100%	No candidate		
2002	H. Truman Chafin	12,713	100%	No candidate		
2006	H. Truman Chafin	14,621	100%	No candidate		
2010	H. Truman Chafin	15,200	100%	No candidate		
2014	H. Truman Chafin	11,172	49%	Mark R. Maynard	11,561	51%
