= Jeff Kessler =

American politician

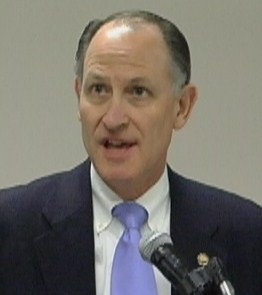

President of the West Virginia Senate Lieutenant Governor of West Virginia
- In office November 15, 2010 (Note: After Tomblin became acting governor, Kessler became acting senate president and lieutenant governor. Both roles became permanent on November 13, 2011, after the 2011 gubernatorial election.) – January 14, 2015
- Governor: Earl Ray Tomblin
- Preceded by: Earl Ray Tomblin
- Succeeded by: Bill Cole

Minority Leader of the West Virginia Senate
- In office January 14, 2015 – January 11, 2017
- Preceded by: Mike Hall
- Succeeded by: Roman Prezioso

Member of the West Virginia Senate from the 2nd district
- In office November 10, 1997 – January 11, 2017
- Preceded by: Larry Wiedebusch
- Succeeded by: Mike Maroney

Personal details
- Born: Jeffrey Vincent Kessler; November 16, 1955 (age 70) Wheeling, West Virginia, U.S.
- Party: Democratic
- Education: West Liberty University (BA); West Virginia University (JD)

Jeffrey Vincent Kessler (born November 16, 1955) is an American politician and former Democratic member of the West Virginia Senate in the United States, representing the 2nd district from 1997 to 2017. He is the former President of the Senate/Lieutenant Governor, Minority Leader of the Senate, Acting President of the Senate and Chairman of the Judiciary Committee. Kessler is also involved in private practice, where he is a partner in the law firm Berry, Kessler, Crutchfield, Taylor & Gordon.

Kessler was born November 16, 1955, in Wheeling, West Virginia. He is the son of George Henry Kessler (1924–2009) and Rosemary Krupica Kessler (1930–1978). He is a 1974 graduate of Bishop Donahue High School in McMechen, West Virginia. He also attended West Liberty State College (now West Liberty University) near Wheeling, West Virginia, and the West Virginia University College of Law in Morgantown, West Virginia.

Kessler unsuccessfully ran for the Democratic nomination in the 2011 gubernatorial election, losing to Earl Ray Tomblin, and in the 2016 gubernatorial election, losing to Jim Justice.

Kessler ran in the 2026 election for United States Senate against incumbent Senator Shelley Moore Capito, however lost the Democratic primary.

== Biography ==
Jeff Kessler was born in 1955, he is of Russian descent on his mother's side. His father served in the US Navy during World War II and the Korean War, then later worked as a cookie salesman for Nabisco, he would bring home free samples and damaged cookies which Kessler enjoyed as a child. His mother stayed at home and took care of Jeff and his three siblings. Jeff's younger brother, Chris, was diagnosed with aplastic anemia when he was a toddler, he went into remission and survived. In 1994, Chris was elected Marshall County Assessor. Kessler's mother later died of breast cancer at the age of 47.

== Positions ==
=== SCORE Initiative ===
In 2014, Kessler spearheaded the SCORE Initiative, which stands for Southern Coalfields Organizing and Revitalizing the Economy. The initiative aims to provide economic opportunities in areas which have suffered from job losses and economic hardships primarily due to losses in the coal industry. According to Kessler, the program acts as a counterpunch to the effects of the "war on coal" and aims to "change our way of thinking so that [Southern West Virginia] can once again become a region that offers our children and grandchildren opportunities for a better future."

=== Abortion ===
In February 2026, Kessler said on Facebook “I’ve always believed in personal responsibility, human dignity, and freedom. My position has evolved because the facts are clear: banning abortion and threatening access to contraception doesn’t protect life — it strips away freedom and endangers health. That’s why, if elected, I will immediately cosponsor the Women’s Health Protection Act to codify Roe v. Wade and the Right to Contraception Act to protect access to birth control and the providers who prescribed it.”

=== Gun control ===
Kessler has previously voted in favor of a bill that eliminated the requirement for a permit and training before a person can carry a concealed weapon. He refers to himself as a "second amendment advocate."

=== Tobacco tax ===
In 2015, Kessler proposed raising the state cigarette tax by $1 per pack, stating that a $1 increase in the cigarette tax would bring in an estimated $130 million. Citing West Virginia's relatively high smoking rate, he has proposed setting aside $20 million of the new revenue for substance abuse programs; this move comes as part of a larger effort He also hopes to set aside $10 million of the money for collegiate scholarships. The idea began to receive increased support in late 2015, with some newspaper boards citing the higher rates of neighboring states and comparing West Virginia's "arbitrarily low" rates to government subsidies for smokers.

Political offices
Preceded by Earl Ray Tomblin	President of the West Virginia Senate; Acting: 2010–2011; 2010–2015	Succeeded by Bill Cole
