= Brooks McCabe =

American politician (born 1949)

Member of the West Virginia Senate from the 17th district
- In office December 1, 1998 – November 15, 2014
- Preceded by: Larry Kimble
- Succeeded by: Tom Takubo

Personal details
- Born: January 19, 1949 (age 77) Charleston, West Virginia, U.S.
- Party: Democratic
- Spouse: Barbara Given
- Children: Katherine Jane
- Education: University of Vermont (B.S., M.Ed.); West Virginia University (Ed.D.)
- Occupation: Managing Member, West Virginia Commercial LLC brokerage

Brooks F. McCabe, Jr. was a Democratic member of the West Virginia Senate, representing the 17th district in Kanawha County. First elected in 1998, Brooks served for eight years as chairman of the Senate Committee on Economic Development. He was a member of the Senate committees on finance banking & insurance, economic development, natural resources, pensions, and government organization. Senator McCabe supported legislation sought by other business leaders relating to major reforms in workers compensation, tax policy, reducing public employee benefits (such as retirement and healthcare) and other pro-business initiatives. In addition, he sponsored legislation relating to economic development, planning and land use which large corporations favored.

McCabe's day job is managing the wealth he inherited from his ancestors and investing money he received from his trust funds in real estate. He remains the primary shareholder and managing member of West Virginia Commercial Properties LLC. As scion of one of Charleston's wealthiest families and a major landholder, he has been a major beneficiary of the pro-business policies he championed. McCabe was a longtime board member of Charleston Renaissance Corporation. He strongly supports the National Trust for Historic Preservation and its Main Street Program which he and his firm have utilized for tax credits and grants to fund numerous projects improving properties he owns.

Other boards on which he has served include the Chemical Alliance Zone, the Charleston Area Medical Center, West Virginia State College Foundation, the University of Vermont, and The Gow School (a private college preparatory school for dyslexic students in South Wales, NY).
