= Larry J. Edgell =

American politician (1946–2025)

Member of the West Virginia Senate from the 2nd district
- In office December 1, 1998 – December 1, 2014
- Preceded by: Don Macnaughtan
- Succeeded by: Kent Leonhardt

Personal details
- Born: November 16, 1946 Hundred, West Virginia, U.S.
- Died: December 24, 2025 (aged 79)
- Party: Democratic
- Spouse: Ceci
- Education: Fairmont State College (B.A.); Salem-Teikyo University (M.A.)
- Profession: Educator

Larry John Edgell (November 16, 1946 – December 24, 2025) was an American politician. He was the Democratic member of the West Virginia Senate, representing the 2nd district from 1998 to 2014. He was the president pro tempore of the Senate. He was also a teacher. He and his wife Cecilia had two children: Eva and Josh. He resided in New Martinsville, West Virginia. Edgell died on December 24, 2025, at the age of 79.

== Electoral history ==
West Virginia's 2nd senatorial district election, 2010
Party	Candidate	Votes	%
Democratic	Larry J. Edgell	19,885	100

West Virginia's 2nd senatorial district election, 2006
Party	Candidate	Votes	%
Democratic	Larry J. Edgell	17,009	64.9
Republican	Wayne A. Weber	9,184	35.1

West Virginia's 2nd senatorial district election, 2002
Party	Candidate	Votes	%
Democratic	Larry J. Edgell	18,030	100

West Virginia's 2nd senatorial district election, 1998
Party	Candidate	Votes	%
Democratic	Larry J. Edgell	11,253	56.4
Republican	Charles H. Clements	8,691	43.6
