= John Pat Fanning =

American politician (1934–2024)

Member of the West Virginia Senate from the 6th district
- In office 1996–2012

Personal details
- Born: August 14, 1934 Iaeger, West Virginia
- Died: January 7, 2024 (aged 89) Charleston, West Virginia
- Party: Democratic
- Spouse: Kathryn Killen
- Education: Davis & Elkins College
- Occupation: Mortician

John Pat Fanning (August 14, 1934 – January 7, 2024) was an American politician who was a Democratic member of the West Virginia Senate, representing the 6th District from 1996. He earlier served from his appointment in June 1968 through 1980, and from 1984 through 1988 and 1996–2012.

In 1988, Fanning was indicted on bribery and conspiracy charges as part of a grand jury investigation into corruption in Mingo County, part of Fanning's district.

On January 7, 2024, Fanning died after a long period of ill health at a rehabilitation center in Charleston, West Virginia. He was 89.
