= 2018 West Virginia Senate election =

- November 6, 2018

17 of the 34 seats in the West Virginia Senate 18 seats needed for a majority

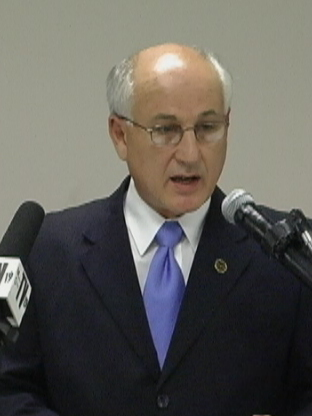
	Majority party	Minority party
Leader	Mitch Carmichael	Roman Prezioso
Party	Republican	Democratic
Leader since	January 11, 2017	January 11, 2017
Leader's seat	4th district	13th district
Seats before	22	12
Seats after	20	14
Seat change	▼2	▲2
Popular vote	306,182	252,564
Percentage	53.4%	44.1%
Swing	▲1.1%	▼3.6%
Seats up	11	6
Races won	9	8
- Results of the elections: Democratic gain Democratic hold Republican hold
Senate President before election
Mitch Carmichael
Republican
Elected Senate President
Mitch Carmichael
Republican

The 2018 West Virginia Senate elections were held on November 6, 2018, as part of the biennial United States elections. 17 of West Virginia's 34 state senators were up for election. West Virginia Senate districts each have two elected representatives. State senators serve staggered four-year terms in West Virginia, with one senator from each district up in even-numbered years corresponding to presidential election years (most recently held in 2016), and the other up in even-numbered years corresponding to presidential midterm years.

Primary elections in the state were held on May 8. After the previous 2016 state elections, Republicans held a majority in the Senate, holding 22 seats to the Democrats' 12. The Republican Party had long been the minority party in West Virginia, but the decline of the strength of coal worker unions, the Democratic Party's increasing focus on environmentalism, the unpopularity of President Barack Obama, and the increasing social conservatism of the Republican Party had helped the GOP solidify power in the state rapidly since 2000.

Despite the high popularity of President Donald Trump within the state and his 42-point margin of victory there in 2016, the Democrats gained two seats in the West Virginia Senate in 2018. This can be attributed to the competitive U.S. Senate race at the top of the ticket (which was won by incumbent Democrat Joe Manchin), the increasing insulation of the West Virginia Democratic Party from the national Democratic Party (particularly on social issues, such as abortion), and a strong year for the Democratic Party nationally, in which they gained control of the U.S. House of Representatives.

Following the state's 2018 Senate elections, Republicans maintained control of the Senate with 20 seats to the Democrats' 14.

== Retirements ==
No incumbents retired in 2018. All 17 incumbent senators ran for re-election.

== Incumbents defeated ==
=== In primary elections ===
Three incumbents were defeated in the May primaries, one more than were defeated in the 2016 primaries.

==== Republicans ====
1. District 4: Mark Drennan lost renomination to Eric Tarr.
2. District 9: Lynne Arvon lost renomination to Rollan Roberts.
3. District 11: Robert Karnes lost renomination to Bill Hamilton.

=== In the general election ===
==== Republicans ====
1. District 1: Ryan Ferns lost to William J. Ihlenfeld.
2. District 8: Ed Gaunch lost to Richard Lindsay.

== Results summary ==
Votes, of total, by party
1. Republican (53.4%)
2. Democratic (44.0%)
3. Independents (2.54%)

All results are certified by the Secretary of State of West Virginia.

Results
Party	Votes		Seats				
Party	Votes	%	Total before	Up	Won	Total after	±
Republican Party	306,182	53.41	22	11	9	20 / 34	▼2
Democratic Party	267,073	44.05	12	6	8	14 / 34	▲2
Independents	14,567	2.54	0	0	0	0 / 34	Steady

Popular vote
Republican	53.41%
Democratic	44.05%
Independents	2.54%

Senate seats
Republican	58.82%
Democratic	41.18%

== Predictions ==
Source	Ranking	As of
Governing	Likely R	October 8, 2018

== Senate president election ==
On January 9, 2019, the West Virginia Senate convened to elect a President for the 84th West Virginia Legislature. The incumbent president, Mitch Carmichael, was nominated by Randy Smith. The nomination was then seconded by Charles Trump. Roman Prezioso received a nomination from Bob Beach, which was seconded by Ron Stollings. In a 19 to 14 vote, Mitch Carmichael was re-elected president of the Senate, having received the support of the eighteen other Republicans present, as well as Senator Prezioso. Mike Maroney, a Republican, was the sole absent member.

Senate Presidential election
Party	Candidate	Votes	%
Republican	Mitch Carmichael (incumbent)	19	57.6
Democratic	Roman Prezioso	14	42.4
Total votes		33	100.0
Republican hold			

Senate presidential election by member
District	Member	Vote
District 3	Mike Azinger	Mitch Carmichael
District 10	Stephen Baldwin	Roman Prezioso
District 13	Bob Beach	Roman Prezioso
District 15	Craig Blair	Mitch Carmichael
District 3	Donna Boley	Mitch Carmichael
District 11	Greg Boso	Mitch Carmichael
District 4	Mitch Carmichael	Roman Prezioso
District 2	Charles Clements	Mitch Carmichael
District 9	Sue Cline	Mitch Carmichael
District 12	Doug Facemire	Roman Prezioso
District 11	Bill Hamilton	Mitch Carmichael
District 1	William Ihlenfeld	Roman Prezioso
District 8	Glenn Jeffries	Roman Prezioso
District 8	Richard Lindsay	Roman Prezioso
District 10	Kenny Mann	Mitch Carmichael
District 6	Mark Maynard	Mitch Carmichael
District 7	Richard Ojeda	Roman Prezioso
District 17	Corey Palumbo	Roman Prezioso
District 5	Robert Plymale	Roman Prezioso
District 13	Roman Prezioso	Mitch Carmichael
District 9	Rollan Roberts	Mitch Carmichael
District 12	Mike Romano	Roman Prezioso
District 16	Patricia Rucker	Mitch Carmichael
District 14	Randy Smith	Mitch Carmichael
District 7	Ron Stollings	Roman Prezioso
District 6	Chandler Swope	Mitch Carmichael
District 14	David Sypolt	Mitch Carmichael
District 17	Tom Takubo	Mitch Carmichael
District 4	Eric Tarr	Mitch Carmichael
District 15	Charles Trump	Mitch Carmichael
District 16	John Unger	Roman Prezioso
District 1	Ryan Weld	Mitch Carmichael
District 5	Mike Woelfel	Roman Prezioso

== Close races ==
District	Winner	Margin
District 8	Democratic (flip)	0.5%
District 16	Democratic	4.3%
District 13	Democratic	4.4%
District 17	Republican	5.0%
District 1	Democratic (flip)	5.8%
District 10	Democratic	6.3%
District 9	Republican	8.1%
District 12	Democratic	9.0%

== Summary of results by state senate district ==
District	Incumbent			Elected senator		Result
District	Member	Party	First elected	Member	Party	Result
District 1	Ryan Ferns	Republican	2014	William Ihlenfeld	Democratic	Democratic gain
District 2	Charles Clements	Republican	2017 (appointed)	Charles Clements	Republican	Republican hold
District 3	Mike Azinger	Republican	2016	Mike Azinger	Republican	Republican hold
District 4	Mark Drennan	Republican	2017 (appointed)	Eric Tarr	Republican	Republican hold
District 5	Mike Woelfel	Democratic	2014	Mike Woelfel	Democratic	Democratic hold
District 6	Mark Maynard	Republican	2014	Mark Maynard	Republican	Republican hold
District 7	Ron Stollings	Democratic	2006	Ron Stollings	Democratic	Democratic hold
District 8	Ed Gaunch	Republican	2014	Richard Lindsay	Democratic	Democratic gain
District 9	Lynne Arvon	Republican	2018 (appointed)	Rollan Roberts	Republican	Republican hold
District 10	Stephen Baldwin	Democratic	2017 (appointed)	Stephen Baldwin	Democratic	Democratic hold
District 11	Robert Karnes	Republican	2014	Bill Hamilton	Republican	Republican hold
District 12	Mike Romano	Democratic	2014	Mike Romano	Democratic	Democratic hold
District 13	Bob Beach	Democratic	2010	Bob Beach	Democratic	Democratic hold
District 14	David Sypolt	Republican	2006	David Sypolt	Republican	Republican hold
District 15	Charles Trump	Republican	2014	Charles Trump	Republican	Republican hold
District 16	John Unger	Democratic	1998	John Unger	Democratic	Democratic hold
District 17	Tom Takubo	Republican	2014	Tom Takubo	Republican	Republican hold

== Detailed results by state senate district ==
All results are certified by the Secretary of State of West Virginia.

=== District 1 ===
==== Republican primary ====
Republican primary
Party	Candidate	Votes	%
Republican	Ryan Ferns (incumbent)	5,233	100.0%
Total votes		5,233	100.0%

==== Democratic primary ====
Democratic primary
Party	Candidate	Votes	%
Democratic	William J. Ihlenfeld II	8,500	100.0%
Total votes		8,500	100.0%

==== General election ====
2018 West Virginia's 1st Senate district election
Party	Candidate	Votes	%
Democratic	William J. Ihlenfeld II	18,450	52.88%
Republican	Ryan Ferns (incumbent)	16,438	47.12%
Total votes		34,888	100%
Democratic gain from Republican			

=== District 2 ===
==== Republican primary ====
Republican primary
Party	Candidate	Votes	%
Republican	Charles Clements (incumbent)	6,809	100.0%
Total votes		6,809	100.0%

==== Democratic primary ====
Democratic primary
Party	Candidate	Votes	%
Democratic	Denny Longwell	5,388	58.94%
Democratic	Carla Jones	3,753	41.06%
Total votes		9,141	100.0%

==== General election ====
2018 West Virginia's 2nd Senate district election
Party	Candidate	Votes	%
Republican	Charles H. Clements (incumbent)	19,895	58.79%
Democratic	Denny Longwell	13,944	41.21%
Total votes		33,839	100%
Republican hold			

=== District 3 ===
==== Republican primary ====
Republican primary
Party	Candidate	Votes	%
Republican	Mike Azinger (incumbent)	6,404	100.0%
Total votes		6,404	100.0%

==== Democratic primary ====
Democratic primary
Party	Candidate	Votes	%
Democratic	Jim Leach	3,695	58.94%
Democratic	Simon Hargus	3,009	44.88%
Total votes		6,704	100.0%

=== General election ===
2018 West Virginia's 3rd Senate district election
Party	Candidate	Votes	%
Republican	Mike Azinger (incumbent)	19,964	57.40%
Democratic	Jim Leach	14,818	42.60%
Total votes		34,782	100%
Republican hold			

=== District 4 ===
==== Republican primary ====
Republican primary
Party	Candidate	Votes	%
Republican	Eric Tarr	4,994	54.76%
Republican	Mark Drennan (incumbent)	4,126	45.24%
Total votes		9,120	100.0%

==== Democratic primary ====
Democratic primary
Party	Candidate	Votes	%
Democratic	Brian Prim	6,819	100.0%
Total votes		6,819	100.0%

==== General election ====
2018 West Virginia's 4th Senate district election
Party	Candidate	Votes	%
Republican	Eric Tarr	18,885	51.78%
Democratic	Brian Prim	13,583	37.24%
Independent	Amy Nichole Grady	4,005	10.98%
Total votes		36,473	100%
Republican hold			

=== District 5 ===
==== Republican primary ====
Republican primary
Party	Candidate	Votes	%
Republican	Larry Brooke Lunsford	4,819	100.0%
Total votes		4,819	100.0%

==== Democratic primary ====
Democratic primary
Party	Candidate	Votes	%
Democratic	Mike Woelfel (incumbent)	7,753	100.0%
Total votes		7,753	100.0%

==== General election ====
2018 West Virginia's 5th Senate district election
Party	Candidate	Votes	%
Democratic	Mike Woelfel (incumbent)	20,305	59.66%
Republican	Larry Brooke Lunsford	13,732	40.34%
Total votes		34,037	100%
Democratic hold			

=== District 6 ===
==== Republican primary ====
Republican primary
Party	Candidate	Votes	%
Republican	Mark Maynard (incumbent)	3,209	61.04%
Republican	Wesley Blankenship	2,048	38.96%
Total votes		5,257	100.0%

==== Democratic primary ====
Democratic primary
Party	Candidate	Votes	%
Democratic	Charles E. Sammons	6,305	100.0%
Total votes		6,305	100.0%

==== General election ====
2018 West Virginia's 6th Senate district election
Party	Candidate	Votes	%
Republican	Mark R. Maynard (incumbent)	17,536	61.51%
Democratic	Charles E. Sammons	10,972	38.49%
Total votes		28,508	100%
Republican hold			

=== District 7 ===
==== Republican primary ====
Republican primary
Party	Candidate	Votes	%
Republican	Jason Stephens	1,851	51.81%
Republican	Gary L. Johngrass	1,722	48.19%
Total votes		3,573	100.0%

==== Democratic primary ====
Democratic primary
Party	Candidate	Votes	%
Democratic	Ron Stollings (incumbent)	9,276	100.0%
Total votes		9,276	100.0%

==== General election ====
2018 West Virginia's 7th Senate district election
Party	Candidate	Votes	%
Democratic	Ron Stollings (incumbent)	15,181	56.70%
Republican	Jason Stephens	11,594	43.30%
Total votes		26,775	100%
Democratic hold			

=== District 8 ===
==== Republican primary ====
Republican primary
Party	Candidate	Votes	%
Republican	Ed Gaunch (incumbent)	5,475	100.0%
Total votes		5,475	100.0%

==== Democratic primary ====
Democratic primary
Party	Candidate	Votes	%
Democratic	Richard Lindsay	4,721	51.72%
Democratic	Mark Hunt	4,407	48.28%
Total votes		9,128	100.0%

==== General election ====
2018 West Virginia's 8th Senate district election
Party	Candidate	Votes	%
Democratic	Richard Lindsay	16,537	50.25%
Republican	Ed Gaunch (incumbent)	16,372	49.75%
Total votes		32,909	100%
Democratic gain from Republican			

=== District 9 ===
==== Republican primary ====
Republican primary
Party	Candidate	Votes	%
Republican	Rollan Roberts	3,384	52.87%
Republican	Lynne Arvon (incumbent)	3,017	47.13%
Total votes		6,401	100.0%

==== Democratic primary ====
Democratic primary
Party	Candidate	Votes	%
Democratic	William R. Wooton	3,649	43.44%
Democratic	John Queensberry	2,171	25.84%
Democratic	Steve Davis	1,731	20.60%
Democratic	Wayne Williams	850	10.12%
Total votes		8,401	100.0%

==== General election ====
2018 West Virginia's 9th Senate district election
Party	Candidate	Votes	%
Republican	Rollan Roberts	16,111	54.07%
Democratic	William R. Wooton	13,686	45.93%
Total votes		29,797	100%
Republican hold			

=== District 10 ===
==== Republican primary ====
Republican primary
Party	Candidate	Votes	%
Republican	George Ambler	4,169	56.45%
Republican	Dan Hill	3,216	43.55%
Total votes		7,385	100.0%

==== Democratic primary ====
Democratic primary
Party	Candidate	Votes	%
Democratic	Stephen Baldwin (incumbent)	10,311	100.0%
Total votes		10,311	100.0%

==== General election ====
2018 West Virginia's 10th Senate district election
Party	Candidate	Votes	%
Democratic	Stephen Baldwin (incumbent)	17,495	53.15%
Republican	George Ambler	15,421	46.85%
Total votes		32,916	100%
Democratic hold			

=== District 11 ===
==== Republican primary ====
Republican primary
Party	Candidate	Votes	%
Republican	Bill Hamilton	6,523	62.25%
Republican	Robert Karnes (incumbent)	3,955	37.75%
Total votes		10,478	100.0%

==== Democratic primary ====
Democratic primary
Party	Candidate	Votes	%
Democratic	Laura M. Finch	5,087	52.42%
Democratic	Margaret Kerr Beckwith	4,617	47.58%
Total votes		9,704	100.0%

==== General election ====
2018 West Virginia's 11th Senate district election
Party	Candidate	Votes	%
Republican	Bill Hamilton	23,718	70.44%
Democratic	Laura M. Finch	9,953	29.56%
Total votes		33,671	100%
Republican hold			

=== District 12 ===
==== Republican primary ====
Republican primary
Party	Candidate	Votes	%
Republican	Waymond Cork II	5,820	100.0%
Total votes		5,820	100.0%

==== Democratic primary ====
Democratic primary
Party	Candidate	Votes	%
Democratic	Mike Romano (incumbent)	9,814	100.0%
Total votes		9,814	100.0%

==== General election ====
2018 West Virginia's 12th Senate district election
Party	Candidate	Votes	%
Democratic	Mike Romano (incumbent)	18,919	54.51%
Republican	Waymond Cork II	15,791	45.49%
Total votes		34,710	100%
Democratic hold			

=== District 13 ===
==== Republican primary ====
Republican primary
Party	Candidate	Votes	%
Republican	Mike Oliverio	4,763	100.0%
Total votes		4,763	100.0%

==== Democratic primary ====
Democratic primary
Party	Candidate	Votes	%
Democratic	Bob Beach (incumbent)	9,383	100.0%
Total votes		9,383	100.0%

==== General election ====
2018 West Virginia's 13th Senate district election
Party	Candidate	Votes	%
Democratic	Bob Beach (incumbent)	18,692	52.18%
Republican	Mike Oliverio	17,129	47.82%
Total votes		35,821	100%
Democratic hold			

=== District 14 ===
==== Republican primary ====
Republican primary
Party	Candidate	Votes	%
Republican	David Sypolt (incumbent)	8,997	100.0%
Total votes		8,997	100.0%

==== Democratic primary ====
Democratic primary
Party	Candidate	Votes	%
Democratic	Stephanie Zucker	7,813	100.0%
Total votes		7,813	100.0%

==== General election ====
2018 West Virginia's 14th Senate district election
Party	Candidate	Votes	%
Republican	David Sypolt (incumbent)	21,936	60.22%
Democratic	Stephanie Zucker	14,492	39.78%
Total votes		36,428	100%
Republican hold			

=== District 15 ===
==== Republican primary ====
Republican primary
Party	Candidate	Votes	%
Republican	Charles S. Trump (incumbent)	7,965	100.0%
Total votes		7,965	100.0%

==== General election ====
2018 West Virginia's 15th Senate district election
Party	Candidate	Votes	%
Republican	Charles S. Trump (incumbent)	25,937	71.06%
Independent	Jason A. Armentrout	10,562	28.94%
Total votes		36,499	100%
Republican hold			

=== District 16 ===
==== Republican primary ====
Republican primary
Party	Candidate	Votes	%
Republican	Michael Craig Folk	5,729	100.0%
Total votes		5,729	100.0%

==== Democratic primary ====
Democratic primary
Party	Candidate	Votes	%
Democratic	John Unger (incumbent)	6,309	100.0%
Total votes		6,309	100.0%

==== General election ====
2018 West Virginia's 16th Senate district election
Party	Candidate	Votes	%
Democratic	John Unger (incumbent)	18,802	52.14%
Republican	Michael Craig Folk	17,257	47.86%
Total votes		36,059	100%
Democratic hold			

=== District 17 ===
==== Republican primary ====
Republican primary
Party	Candidate	Votes	%
Republican	Tom Takubo (incumbent)	5,873	100.0%
Total votes		5,873	100.0%

==== Democratic primary ====
Democratic primary
Party	Candidate	Votes	%
Democratic	Terrell Ellis	5,317	52.01%
Democratic	Mary Ann Claytor	3,746	36.64%
Democratic	Justin 'Dick' Salsbury	1,161	11.36%
Total votes		10,224	100.0%

==== General election ====
2018 West Virginia's 17th Senate district election
Party	Candidate	Votes	%
Republican	Tom Takubo (incumbent)	18,466	52.46%
Democratic	Terrell Ellis	16,735	47.54%
Total votes		35,201	100%
Republican hold			
