= 2020 West Virginia Senate election =

- November 3, 2020

17 of the 34 seats in the West Virginia Senate 18 seats needed for a majority

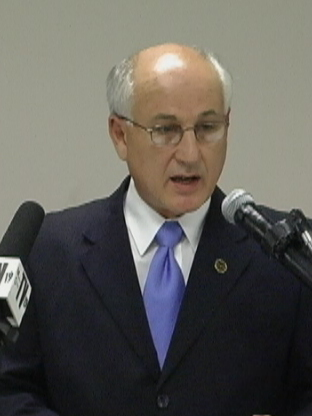
	Majority party	Minority party
Leader	Mitch Carmichael (lost renomination)	Roman Prezioso (retired)
Party	Republican	Democratic
Leader since	January 11, 2017	January 11, 2017
Leader's seat	4th district	13th district
Seats before	20	14
Seats after	23	11
Seat change	▲3	▼3
Popular vote	456,726	267,073
Percentage	61.2%	36.1%
Swing	▲7.8%	▼8.0%
Seats up	11	6
Races won	14	3
- Results of the elections: Republican gain Democratic hold Republican hold
Senate President before election
Mitch Carmichael
Republican
Elected Senate President
Craig Blair
Republican

The 2020 West Virginia Senate elections were held on November 3, 2020, as part of the biennial United States elections. Seventeen of the 34 West Virginia state senators stood for election. West Virginia Senate districts each have two elected representatives.

== Retirements ==
Four incumbents did not run for re-election in 2020. Those incumbents were:

=== Republicans ===
1. District 10: Kenny Mann: Retiring

=== Democrats ===
1. District 7: Paul Hardesty: Retiring
2. District 13: Roman Prezioso: Retiring
3. District 17: Corey Palumbo: Retiring

== Incumbents defeated ==
=== In primary elections ===
Three incumbents were defeated in the June 9 primaries, the same number as were defeated in the 2018 primaries. Senator Mitch Carmichael (R) was one of the three incumbents defeated. As president of the state Senate, Carmichael also served as the lieutenant governor of West Virginia.

==== Republicans ====
1. District 4: Mitch Carmichael lost renomination to Amy Nichole Grady.
2. District 9: Sue Cline lost renomination to David Stover.
3. District 11: John Pitsenbarger lost renomination to Robert Karnes.

=== In the general election ===
==== Democrat ====
1. District 12: Doug Facemire lost to Patrick Martin.

== Predictions ==
Source	Ranking	As of
The Cook Political Report	Likely R	October 21, 2020

== Results summary ==
Votes, of total, by party
1. Republican (61.8%)
2. Democratic (36.1%)
3. Mountain (1.34%)
4. Libertarian (0.71%)

All results are certified by the Secretary of State of West Virginia.

Results
Party	Votes		Seats				
Party	Votes	%	Total before	Up	Won	Total after	±
Republican Party	456,726	61.81	20	11	14	23 / 34	▲3
Democratic Party	267,073	36.14	14	6	3	11 / 34	▼3
Mountain Party	10,324	1.34	0	0	0	0 / 34	Steady
Libertarian Party	5,307	0.71	0	0	0	0 / 34	Steady

Popular vote
Republican	61.81%
Democratic	36.14%
Mountain	1.34%
Libertarian	0.71%

Senate seats
Republican	67.64%
Democratic	32.35%

== Senate president election ==
On January 13, 2021, the West Virginia Senate convened to elect a president for the 85th Legislature. Republican leader and incumbent president Mitch Carmichael lost renomination, leaving the presidency open to a new senator. Senator Craig Blair was nominated by fellow 15th district member Charles Trump, and was seconded by Eric Tarr. On a motion of Senator Stephen Baldwin, nominations for the presidency were closed, and Senator Blair was elected by acclamation to the office of Senate president.

Senate president election
Party	Candidate	Votes	%
Republican	Craig Blair	Acclamation	100.0
Total votes		31	100.0
Republican hold			

== Close races ==
District	Winner	Margin
District 11	Republican	2.6%
District 16	Republican	4.4%
District 1	Republican	6.2%
District 5	Democratic	6.8%
District 17	Republican (flip)	7.4%
District 8	Democratic	11.6%
District 7	Republican (flip)	12.4%
District 13	Democratic	13.6%
District 12	Republican (flip)	14.0%

== Summary of results by state senate district ==
District	Incumbent			Elected senator		Result
District	Member	Party	Since	Member	Party	Result
District 1	Ryan Weld	Republican	2016	Ryan Weld	Republican	Republican hold
District 2	Mike Maroney	Republican	2016	Mike Maroney	Republican	Republican hold
District 3	Donna Boley	Republican	1985	Donna Boley	Republican	Republican hold
District 4	Mitch Carmichael	Republican	2012	Amy Grady	Republican	Republican hold
District 5	Robert Plymale	Democratic	1992	Robert Plymale	Democratic	Democratic hold
District 6	Chandler Swope	Republican	2016	Chandler Swope	Republican	Republican hold
District 7	Paul Hardesty	Democratic	2018	Rupie Phillips	Republican	Republican gain
District 8	Glenn Jeffries	Democratic	2016	Glenn Jeffries	Democratic	Democratic hold
District 9	Sue Cline	Republican	2016	David Stover	Republican	Republican hold
District 10	Kenny Mann	Republican	2016	Jack Woodrum	Republican	Republican hold
District 11	John Pitsenbarger	Republican	2019	Robert Karnes	Republican	Republican hold
District 12	Doug Facemire	Democratic	2008	Patrick Martin	Republican	Republican gain
District 13	Roman Prezioso	Democratic	1996	Mike Caputo	Democratic	Democratic hold
District 14	Randy Smith	Republican	2016	Randy Smith	Republican	Republican hold
District 15	Craig Blair	Republican	2012	Craig Blair	Republican	Republican hold
District 16	Patricia Rucker	Republican	2016	Patricia Rucker	Republican	Republican hold
District 17	Corey Palumbo	Democratic	2009	Eric Nelson	Republican	Republican gain

== Detailed results by state senate district ==
=== District 1 ===
==== Republican primary ====
Republican primary
Party	Candidate	Votes	%
Republican	Ryan Weld (incumbent)	7,088	64.5%
Republican	Jack Newbrough	3,904	35.5%
Total votes		10,992	100.0%

==== Democratic primary ====
Democratic primary
Party	Candidate	Votes	%
Democratic	Randy Swartzmiller	10,995	100.0%
Total votes		10,995	100.0%

==== General election ====
West Virginia's 1st Senate district general election, 2020
Party	Candidate	Votes	%
Republican	Ryan Weld (incumbent)	23,593	53.1%
Democratic	Randy Swartzmiller	20,836	46.9%
Total votes		44,429	100.0%
Republican hold			

=== District 2 ===
==== Republican primary ====
Republican primary
Party	Candidate	Votes	%
Republican	Mike Maroney (incumbent)	7,835	61.5%
Republican	Elijah Dean	4,904	38.5%
Total votes		12,739	100.0%

==== Democratic primary ====
Democratic primary
Party	Candidate	Votes	%
Democratic	Josh Gary	5,663	51.3%
Democratic	Carla Jones	5,379	48.7%
Total votes		11,042	100.0%

==== General election ====
West Virginia's 2nd Senate district general election, 2020
Party	Candidate	Votes	%
Republican	Mike Maroney (incumbent)	24,761	56.2%
Democratic	Josh Gary	19,269	43.8%
Total votes		44,030	100.0%
Republican hold			

=== District 3 ===
==== Republican primary ====
Republican primary
Party	Candidate	Votes	%
Republican	Donna Boley (incumbent)	10,628	100.0%
Total votes		10,628	100.0%

==== Democratic primary ====
Democratic primary
Party	Candidate	Votes	%
Democratic	Robert Wilson Jr.	6,840	100.0%
Total votes		6,840	100.0%

==== General election ====
West Virginia's 3rd Senate district general election, 2020
Party	Candidate	Votes	%
Republican	Donna Boley (incumbent)	29,630	66.3%
Democratic	Robert Wilson Jr.	11,706	26.2%
Libertarian	Travis Shultz	3,363	7.5%
Total votes		44,699	100.0%
Republican hold			

=== District 4 ===
==== Republican primary ====
Republican primary
Party	Candidate	Votes	%
Republican	Amy Nichole Grady	6,402	39.1%
Republican	Mitch Carmichael (incumbent)	5,726	34.9%
Republican	Jim Butler	4,265	26.0%
Total votes		16,393	100.0%

==== Democratic primary ====
Democratic primary
Party	Candidate	Votes	%
Democratic	Bruce Ashworth	9,096	100.0%
Total votes		9,096	100.0%

==== General election ====
West Virginia's 4th Senate district general election, 2020
Party	Candidate	Votes	%
Republican	Amy Nichole Grady	33,206	70.7%
Democratic	Bruce Ashworth	11,885	25.3%
Libertarian	Loyd Butcher	1,895	4.0%
Total votes		46,986	100.0%
Republican hold			

=== District 5 ===
West Virginia's 5th Senate district general election, 2020
Party	Candidate	Votes	%
Democratic	Robert H. Plymale (incumbent)	22,349	53.4%
Republican	Charles Shaffer	19,478	46.6%
Total votes		41,827	100.0%
Democratic hold			

=== District 6 ===
West Virginia's 6th Senate district general election, 2020
Party	Candidate	Votes	%
Republican	Chandler Swope (incumbent)	33,553	100.0%
Total votes		33,553	100.0%
Republican hold			

=== District 7 ===
West Virginia's 7th Senate district general election, 2020
Party	Candidate	Votes	%
Republican	Rupie Phillips	20,484	56.2%
Democratic	Ralph Rodighiero	15,965	43.8%
Total votes		36,449	100.0%
Republican gain from Democratic			

=== District 8 ===
West Virginia's 8th Senate district general election, 2020
Party	Candidate	Votes	%
Democratic	Glenn Jeffries (incumbent)	23,243	55.8%
Republican	Kathie Hess Crouse	18,427	44.2%
Total votes		41,670	100.0%
Democratic hold			

=== District 9 ===
West Virginia's 9th Senate district general election, 2020
Party	Candidate	Votes	%
Republican	David Stover	35,141	100.0%
Total votes		35,141	100.0%
Republican hold			

=== District 10 ===
West Virginia's 10th Senate district general election, 2020
Party	Candidate	Votes	%
Republican	Jack Woodrum	25,191	58.6%
Democratic	William Laird IV	17,812	41.4%
Total votes		43,003	100.0%
Republican hold			

=== District 11 ===
West Virginia's 11th Senate district general election, 2020
Party	Candidate	Votes	%
Republican	Robert Karnes	23,229	51.3%
Democratic	Denise Campbell	22,018	48.7%
Total votes		45,247	100.0%
Republican hold			

=== District 12 ===
West Virginia's 12th Senate district general election, 2020
Party	Candidate	Votes	%
Republican	Patrick Martin	26,066	57.0%
Democratic	Doug Facemire (incumbent)	19,699	43.0%
Total votes		45,765	100.0%
Republican gain from Democratic			

=== District 13 ===
West Virginia's 13th Senate district general election, 2020
Party	Candidate	Votes	%
Democratic	Mike Caputo	25,870	56.8%
Republican	Rebecca Polis	20,178	43.2%
Total votes		46,048	100.0%
Democratic hold			

=== District 14 ===
West Virginia's 14th Senate district general election, 2020
Party	Candidate	Votes	%
Republican	Randy Smith (incumbent)	35,191	72.6%
Democratic	David Childers	13,254	27.3%
Total votes		48,455	100.0%
Republican hold			

=== District 15 ===
West Virginia's 15th Senate district general election, 2020
Party	Candidate	Votes	%
Republican	Craig Blair (incumbent)	41,560	80.1%
Mountain	Donald Kinnie	10,324	19.9%
Total votes		51,884	100.0%
Republican hold			

=== District 16 ===
West Virginia's 16th Senate district general election, 2020
Party	Candidate	Votes	%
Republican	Patricia Rucker (incumbent)	24,928	52.2%
Democratic	Pete Dougherty	22,803	47.8%
Total votes		47,731	100.0%
Republican hold			

=== District 17 ===
West Virginia's 17th Senate district general election, 2020
Party	Candidate	Votes	%
Republican	Eric Nelson	23,584	53.7%
Democratic	Andrew Robinson	20,364	46.3%
Total votes		43,948	100.0%
Republican gain from Democratic			
