= Senator Swope =

Senator Swope may refer to:

- Chandler Swope (born 1942), West Virginia State Senate
- Samuel F. Swope (1809–1865), Kentucky State Senate
