= Senator Tarr =

Senator Tarr may refer to:

- Bruce Tarr (born 1964), Massachusetts State Senate
- Eric Tarr (born 1972), West Virginia State Senate
