= Orphy =

Orphy is a given name. Notable people with the name include:

- Orphy Klempa (1951–2021), American politician
- Orphy Robinson (born 1960), British jazz multi-instrumentalist
