= Karen Facemyer =

American politician

Member of the West Virginia Senate from the 4th district
- In office December 1, 2000 – December 1, 2012
- Preceded by: Robert L. Dittmar
- Succeeded by: Mitch Carmichael

Member of the West Virginia House of Delegates from the 12th district
- In office December 1, 1992 – December 1, 2000
- Preceded by: Multi-member district
- Succeeded by: Mitch Carmichael

Personal details
- Born: June 17, 1954 (age 72) Fort Belvoir, Virginia
- Party: Republican

Karen Facemyer (born June 17, 1954) is an American politician who served in the West Virginia House of Delegates from the 12th district from 1992 to 2000 and in the West Virginia Senate from the 4th district from 2000 to 2012.
