= Senator Helton =

Senator Helton may refer to:

- Brian Helton (born 1970), West Virginia State Senate
- Sam Helton (1954–2016), Oklahoma State Senate
