= Senator Stover =

Senator Stover may refer to:

- David Stover (politician) (born 1954), West Virginia State Senate
- Elias S. Stover (1836–1927), Kansas State Senate
