= Russ Weeks =

American politician (1942–2024)

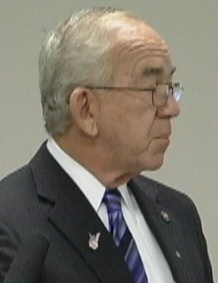

Member of the West Virginia Senate from the 9th district
- In office December 1, 2002 – December 1, 2006
- Preceded by: William R. Wooton
- Succeeded by: Mike Green

Personal details
- Born: Russell Edgar Weeks Jr. May 12, 1942 Beckley, West Virginia, U.S.
- Died: December 19, 2024 (aged 82) New Bern, North Carolina, U.S.
- Party: Republican
- Spouse: Helen Weeks

Military service
- Allegiance: United States
- Branch/service: United States Navy
- Battles/wars: Vietnam War

Russell Edgar Weeks Jr. (May 12, 1942 – December 19, 2024) was an American politician who served as a State Senator from West Virginia's 9th Senatorial District as a member of the Republican party. Weeks was elected in 2002, defeating Senate Judiciary Chairman William R. Wooton. Weeks had not served in public office prior to being elected. He was defeated in 2006. He was the Republican nominee at the 2008 West Virginia gubernatorial election but was defeated by Democrat Joe Manchin.

Born May 12, 1942, to Jeanette Weeks and Russ Weeks, Sr. in Beckley, West Virginia, he was a lifelong resident of the city. He was married to Helen C. Peterson with whom he had two children. The couple has three grandchildren.

Weeks did not graduate from high school but began working to help support his mother and siblings. He enlisted in the US Navy and served in Vietnam, commanding a boat in the Mekong Delta.

Returning to Beckley, he became a leader in the Right to Life organization. This advocacy spurred his interest in seeking public office. Weeks won the 2002 election.

West Virginia Senate election District 9, 2002
Party	Candidate	Votes	%
Republican	Russ Weeks	9,982	51.66%
Democratic	William R. Wooton	9,340	48.34%
Total votes		19,322	100.00%
Republican gain from Democratic			

His committee assignments included: Judiciary, Government Organization, Health and Human Resources, Military, Energy, Industry and Mining, and Agriculture.

Weeks was defeated for re-election in November 2006 by Democrat Mike Green.

In January 2008 it was reported that Weeks was planning to challenge incumbent Governor Joe Manchin in the 2008 election. Russ became the Republican nominee and lost the general election to Manchin. On December 19, 2024, Weeks died at his home in New Bern, North Carolina, at the age of 82.

== See also ==
- List of members of the 77th West Virginia Senate
- 2008 West Virginia gubernatorial election

Party political offices
Preceded by Monty Warner	Republican nominee for Governor of West Virginia; 2008	Succeeded by Bill Maloney
