= Mike Hall (West Virginia politician) =

American politician (born 1948)

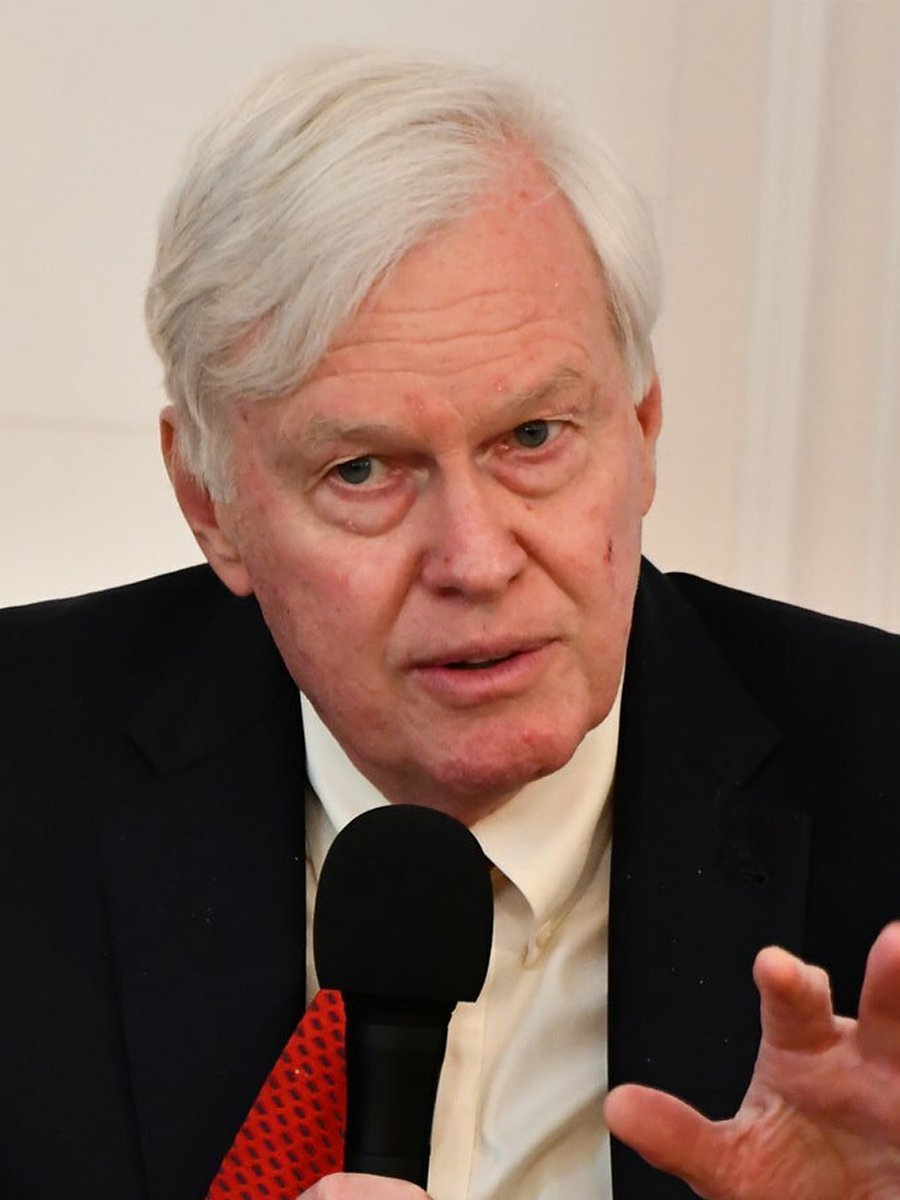

Member of the West Virginia Senate from the 4th district
- In office December 1, 2006 – August 16, 2017 Serving with Mitch Carmichael
- Preceded by: Charles C. Lanham
- Succeeded by: Mark Drennan

Member of the West Virginia House of Delegates from the 14th district
- In office December 1, 1994 – December 1, 2006
- Succeeded by: Troy Andes

Personal details
- Born: November 3, 1948 (age 77) Huntington, West Virginia, U.S.
- Party: Republican
- Education: Marshall University (B.A.)

William Michael Hall (born November 3, 1948) is an American politician and chief of staff to the governor of West Virginia Jim Justice. He previously was a Republican member of the West Virginia Senate representing District 4 between 2006 and 2017. Hall served six terms in the West Virginia House of Delegates, representing the 14th district. In 2012, Hall was nominated by the Republican Party as its nominee for the office of West Virginia State Treasurer. He was defeated in the general election by incumbent State Treasurer John Perdue.

== Elections ==
- 2012 To challenge incumbent Democratic West Virginia Treasurer John Perdue, Hall won the May 8, 2012 Republican Primary with 49,433 votes (55.6%), but lost the November 6, 2012 General election to Perdue.
- 1990s Hall was initially elected to the District 14 seat in the 1994 Republican Primary and November 8, 1994, General election and re-elected in the general election of November 5, 1996.
- 1998 Hall placed in the five-way 1998 Republican Primary and was re-elected in the four-way two-position November 3, 1998 General election along with fellow Republican nominee Lisa Smith.
- 2000 Hall and Delegate Smith were unopposed for the 2000 Republican Primary and were re-elected in the four-way two-position November 7, 2000 General election.
- 2002 When Delegate Smith ran for West Virginia Senate and left a district seat open, Hall was joined in the 2002 Republican Primary and was re-elected in the three-way two-position November 5, 2002 General election with Republican nominee Patti Schoen.
- 2004 Hall and Delegate Schoen were unopposed for the 2004 Republican Primary and were re-elected in the four-way two-position November 2, 2004 General election.
- 2006 When Senator Smith left the Legislature and left a District 4 seat open, Hall was unopposed for the 2006 Republican Primary and won the November 7, 2006 General election narrowly against Democratic nominee Jim Lees, who had run for governor in 1996, 2000 and 2004.
- 2010 Hall was unopposed for both the May 11, 2010 Republican Primary, winning with 5,874 votes, and the November 2, 2010 General election, winning with 27,072 votes.

Party political offices
Vacant Title last held by Bob Adams	Republican nominee for West Virginia State Treasurer; 2012	Succeeded by Ann Urling
