= Orphy Klempa =

American politician (1951–2021)

Member of the West Virginia Senate from the 1st district
- In office December 1, 2010 – December 10, 2012
- Preceded by: Edwin Bowman
- Succeeded by: Rocky Fitzsimmons

Member of the West Virginia House of Delegates from the 3rd district
- In office December 1, 2006 – December 1, 2010
- Preceded by: L. Gil White; Chris Wakim
- Succeeded by: Erikka Lynn Storch; Ryan Ferns

Personal details
- Born: October 9, 1951 Wheeling, West Virginia
- Died: October 11, 2021 (aged 70) Wheeling, West Virginia
- Party: Democratic

Orphy Klempa (October 9, 1951 – October 11, 2021) was an American politician who served in the West Virginia House of Delegates from the 3rd district from 2006 to 2010 and in the West Virginia Senate from the 1st district from 2010 to 2012.

He died of bladder cancer on October 9, 2021, in Wheeling, West Virginia at age 70.
