= Mike Romano =

Mike Romano may refer to:

- Mike Romano (baseball)
- Mike Romano (politician)
