= William R. Wooton =

American politician and judge (born 1944)

Bill Wooton

Chief Justice of the West Virginia Supreme Court of Appeals
- In office January 1, 2025 – December 31, 2025
- Preceded by: Tim Armstead
- Succeeded by: C. Haley Bunn

Justice of the West Virginia Supreme Court of Appeals
- Incumbent
- Assumed office January 1, 2021
- Preceded by: Margaret Workman

Member of the West Virginia Senate from the 9th district
- In office December 1, 1990 – December 1, 2002
- Preceded by: Tracy Hylton
- Succeeded by: Russ Weeks

Personal details
- Born: September 20, 1944 (age 81) Beckley, West Virginia, U.S.
- Party: Democratic
- Spouse: Shir
- Children: 3
- Education: Marshall University (BA); West Virginia University (JD)

William R. Wooton (born September 20, 1944) is an American attorney and politician who has served as a justice of the Supreme Court of Appeals of West Virginia since January 1, 2021. He served as chief justice in 2025.

== Education ==
Wooton received his Bachelor of Arts in business management from Marshall University and his Juris Doctor from the West Virginia University College of Law, where he was editor-in-Chief of the West Virginia Law Review, Order of the Coif, and graduated at the top of his class.

== Political career ==
=== House of Delegates ===
Wooton was a member of the West Virginia House of Delegates representing District 27 from 1978 to 1986, 1988 to 1990, and 2008 to 2010. He served as House Majority Leader from 1985 to 1986.

=== Senate ===
Wooton served in the West Virginia Senate from 1991 through 2002 and also served as the Chairman of the Senate Judiciary Committee. Wooton was also an unsuccessful candidate to return to the Senate in 2018.

== Legal and judicial career ==
Wooton was a law clerk for Judge John A. Field Jr. of the United States Court of Appeals for the Fourth Circuit from 1971 to 1972; an assistant West Virginia Attorney General from 1972 to 1974; and an assistant Raleigh County prosecutor from 1974 to 1977. He practiced law in Beckley with the firm Wooton, Wooton & Fragile from 1977 until 1994; with The Wooton Law Firm from 1994 until 2014; and with Wooton & Wooton, Attorneys at Law, from 2014 to 2020.

=== Supreme Court of Appeals of West Virginia ===
Wooton was elected to a 12 year term in a nonpartisan election to the Supreme Court of Appeals on June 9, 2020, and began his term on January 1, 2021. He was an unsuccessful candidate for the court in 2016, losing to future colleague Beth Walker.

While the Court was hearing oral arguments on September 2, 2026, Wooton suffered a "medical emergency" which necessitated emergency personnel entering the courtroom and Wooton transported to a local hospital.

== Personal life ==
Wooton served in the West Virginia Army National Guard and the United States Army Reserve, reaching the rank of colonel.

He is married to his wife, Shir, and they have three adult sons and five grandchildren.

== Electoral history ==
Supreme Court of Appeals, Division II 2020 Election results
Party	Candidate	Votes	%
Nonpartisan	Bill Wooton	115,668	31.0%
Nonpartisan	Joanna Tabit	108,952	29.2%
Nonpartisan	Kris Raynes	74,334	19.9%
Nonpartisan	Jim Douglas	73,843	19.8%
Total votes		372,797	100.0%

Legal offices
Preceded by Margaret Workman	Justice of the West Virginia Supreme Court of Appeals; 2021–present	Incumbent
Preceded by Tim Armstead	Chief Justice of the West Virginia Supreme Court of Appeals; 2025	Succeeded by C. Haley Bunn
