= Patrick S. Martin =

American politician

Patrick Martin

Majority Leader of the West Virginia Senate
- Incumbent
- Assumed office January 8, 2025
- Preceded by: Tom Takubo

Member of the West Virginia Senate from the 12th district
- Incumbent
- Assumed office December 1, 2020 Serving with Mike Romano
- Preceded by: Doug Facemire

Personal details
- Born: May 1, 1993 (age 33)
- Party: Republican

Patrick S. Martin is an American politician serving as a member of the West Virginia Senate from the 12th district. Elected in November 2020, he assumed office on December 1, 2020, succeeding incumbent Democrat Doug Facemire.

Martin lives in Jane Lew, West Virginia. He also serves as the vice chair of the Senate Economic Development Committee.

West Virginia Senate
Preceded by Tom Takubo	Majority Leader of the West Virginia Senate; 2025–present	Incumbent
