= West Virginia's 12th Senate district =

American legislative district

West Virginia's 12th State Senate district
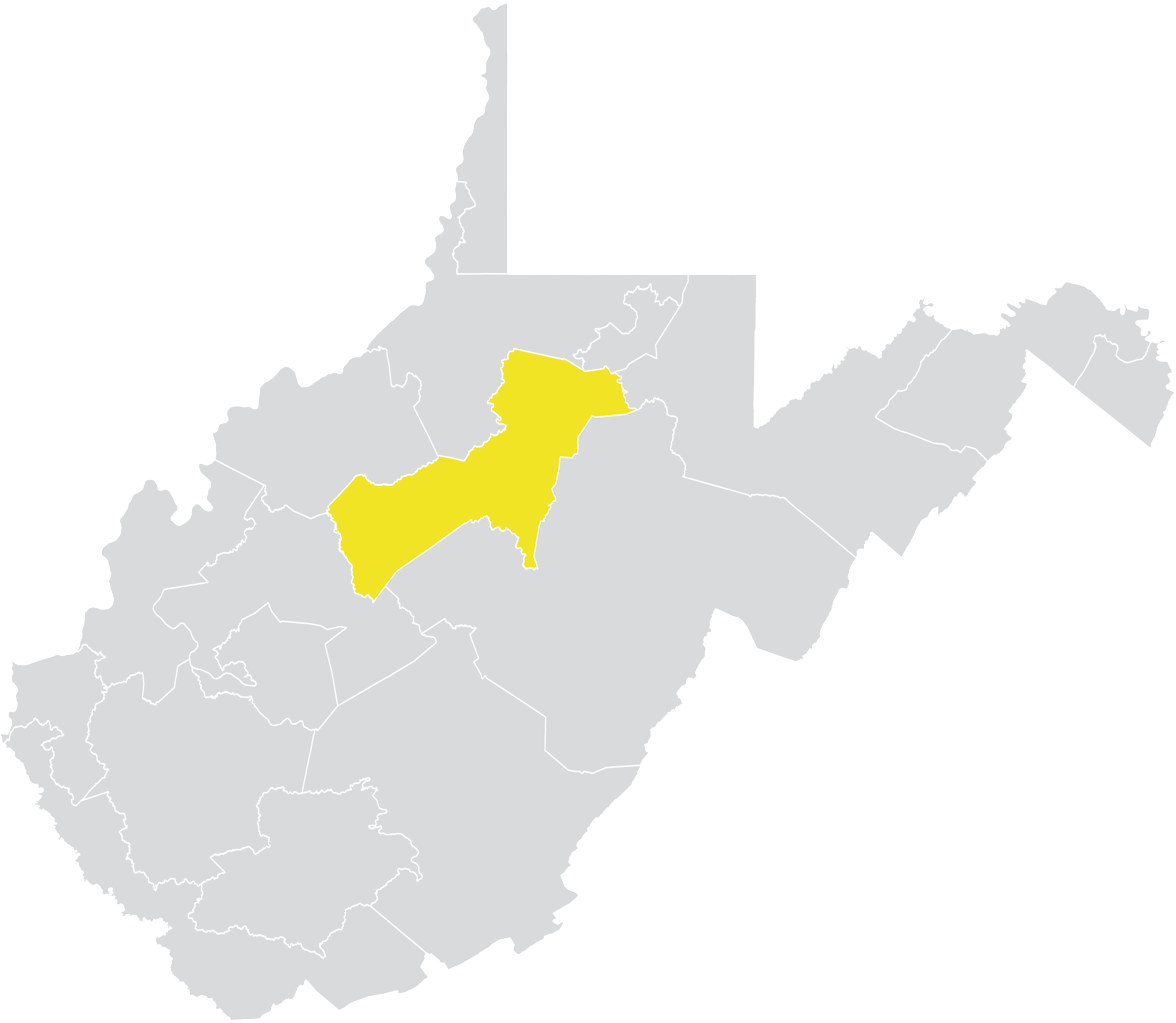
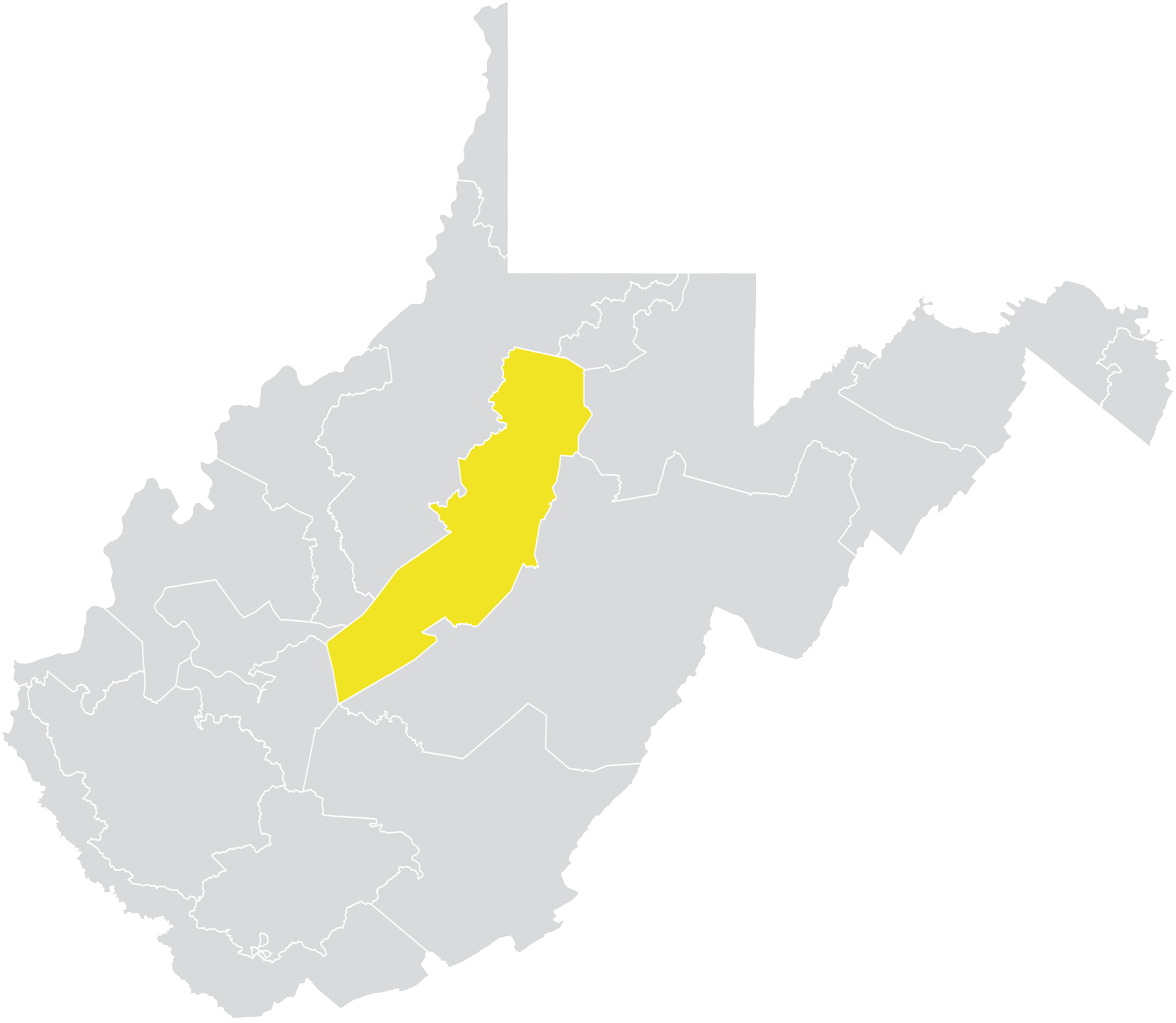
Senator
Ben Queen; R–Bridgeport
Patrick Martin; R–Jane Lew
- Demographics: 94% White; 2% Black; 2% Hispanic; 0% Asian; 2% Other
- Population (2017): 112,641

West Virginia's 12th Senate district is one of 17 districts in the West Virginia Senate. It is currently represented by Republicans Ben Queen and Patrick Martin. All districts in the West Virginia Senate elect two members to staggered four-year terms.

== Geography ==
District 12 covers all of Braxton, Clay, Harrison, and Lewis Counties and parts of Gilmer County in the center of the state. Communities within the district include Clarksburg, Bridgeport, Salem, Shinnston, Stonewood, Nutter Fort, Despard, Clay, Sutton, Glenville, and Weston.

The district overlaps with West Virginia's 1st and 2nd congressional districts, and with the 32nd, 33rd, 34th, 46th, and 48th districts of the West Virginia House of Delegates.

== Recent election results ==
=== 2024 ===
2024 West Virginia Senate election, District 12
Primary election
Party	Candidate	Votes	%
Republican	Patrick S. Martin (incumbent)	11,744	100.0
Total votes		11,744	100.0
General election
Republican	Patrick S. Martin (incumbent)	37,167	100.0
Total votes		37,167	100
Republican hold			

=== 2022 ===
2022 West Virginia Senate election, District 12
Party	Candidate	Votes	%
Republican	Ben Queen	18,711	68.7
Libertarian	Austin Lynch	8,529	31.3
Total votes		27,248	100%

== Historical election results ==
=== 2020 ===
2020 West Virginia Senate election, District 12
Primary election
Party	Candidate	Votes	%
Republican	Patrick Martin	8,490	75.4
Republican	Derrick Love	2,774	24.6
Total votes		11,264	100
General election
Republican	Patrick Martin	26,176	56.9
Democratic	Doug Facemire (incumbent)	19,818	43.1
Total votes		45,994	100
Republican gain from Democratic			

=== 2018 ===
2018 West Virginia Senate election, District 12
Party	Candidate	Votes	%
Democratic	Mike Romano (incumbent)	18,919	54.5
Republican	Waymond Cork	15,791	45.5
Total votes		34,710	100
Democratic hold			

=== 2016 ===
2016 West Virginia Senate election, District 12
Primary election
Party	Candidate	Votes	%
Republican	Franklin Cornette	5,442	54.2
Republican	Derrick W. Love	4,593	45.8
Total votes		10,035	100
General election
Democratic	Doug Facemire (incumbent)	21,295	50.1
Republican	Franklin Cornette	21,188	49.9
Total votes		42,483	100
Democratic hold			

=== 2014 ===
2014 West Virginia Senate election, District 12
Primary election
Party	Candidate	Votes	%
Democratic	Mike Romano	7,308	55.7
Democratic	Sam Cann (incumbent)	5,823	44.3
Total votes		13,131	100
General election
Democratic	Mike Romano	14,036	50.0
Republican	Mike L. Queen	11,850	42.2
Libertarian	Patrick Smith	2,192	7.8
Total votes		28,078	100
Democratic hold			

=== 2012 ===
2012 West Virginia Senate election, District 12
Party	Candidate	Votes	%
Democratic	Doug Facemire (incumbent)	29,173	100
Total votes		29,173	100
Democratic hold			

=== Federal and statewide results ===
Year	Office	Results
2020	President	Trump 70.8 – 27.3%
2016	President	Trump 69.5 – 25.5%
2014	Senate	Capito 59.2 – 37.1%
2012	President	Romney 61.8 – 35.9%
2012	Senate	Manchin 58.7 – 38.1%
2012	Governor	Tomblin 50.4 – 46.3%
