= West Virginia's 6th Senate district =

American legislative district

West Virginia's 6th State Senate district
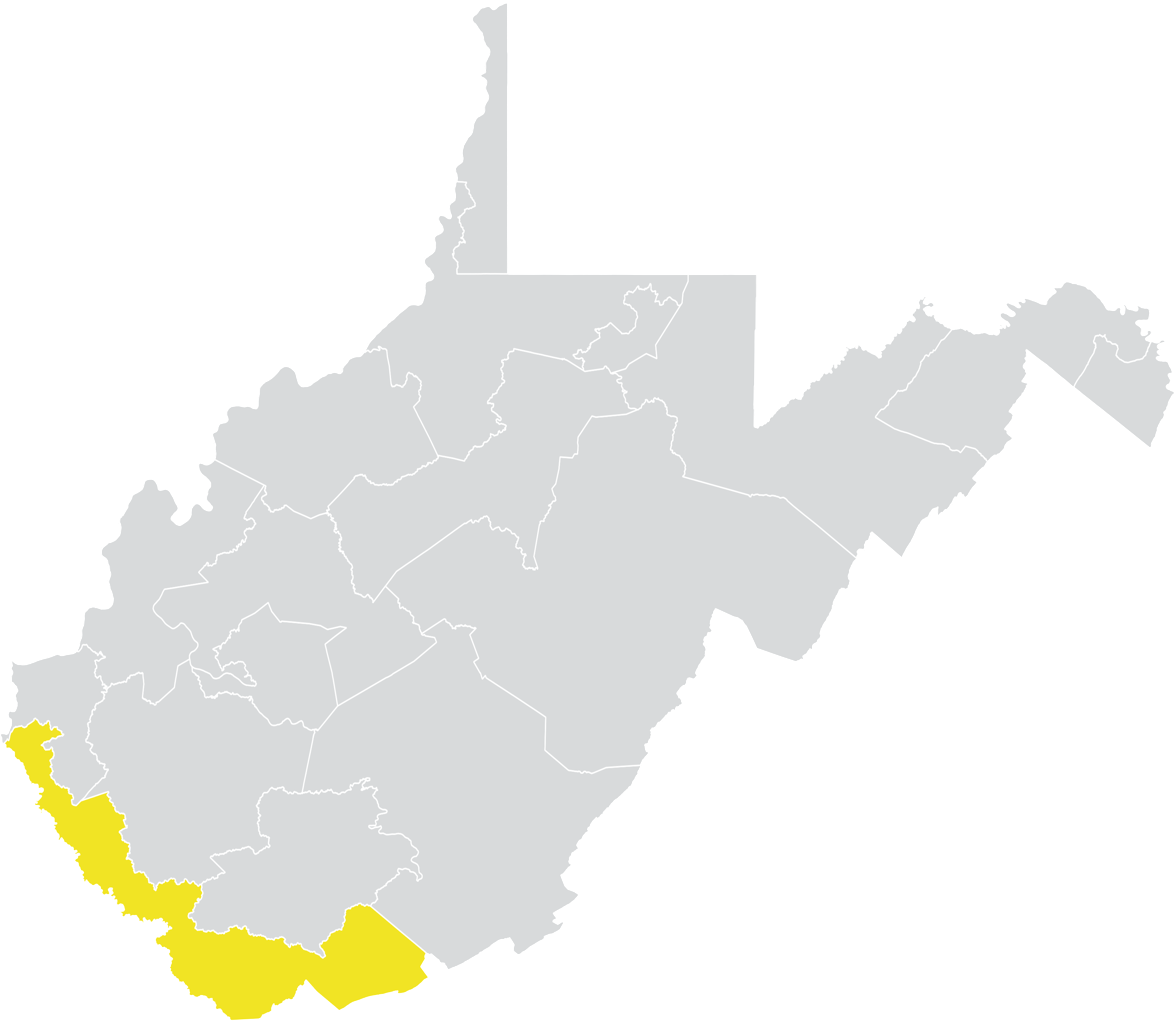
Senator
Mark Maynard; R–Genoa
Craig A. Hart; R–Lenore
- Demographics: 89% White; 7% Black; 1% Hispanic; 0% Asian; 2% Native American
- Population (2021): 110,696

West Virginia's 6th Senate district is one of 17 districts in the West Virginia Senate. It is currently represented by Republicans Mark Maynard and Craig A. Hart. All districts in the West Virginia Senate elect two members to staggered four-year terms. District 6 is currently the most Republican-leaning district in the Senate.

== Geography ==
District 6 stretches along the state's southwestern border, covering all of Mercer County and parts of McDowell, Mingo, and Wayne Counties. It includes the communities of Bluefield, Princeton, Bluewell, Athens, Welch, Williamson, and Gilbert Creek.

The district is located entirely within West Virginia's 1st congressional district, and overlaps with the 29th, 34th, 36th, 37th, 38th, 39th, and 41st districts of the West Virginia House of Delegates. It borders the states of Kentucky and Virginia.

== Recent election results ==
=== 2024 ===
2024 West Virginia Senate election, District 6
Primary election
Party	Candidate	Votes	%
Republican	Craig A. Hart	4,847	40.9
Republican	Chandler Swope (incumbent)	4,384	36.9
Republican	Eric Porterfield	2,633	22.2
Total votes		11,864	100.0
Democratic	Randy Fowler	3,748	100.0
Total votes		3,748	100.0
General election
Republican	Craig A. Hart	23,014	61.0
Democratic	Jeff DiSibbio	12,924	34.3
Independent	Dave Sartin	1,765	4.7
Total votes		37,703	100
Republican hold			

DiSibbio became the Democratic nominee after Fowler was disqualified for not filing required campaign finance reports.

=== 2022 ===
2022 West Virginia Senate election, District 6
Primary election
Party	Candidate	Votes	%
Republican	Mark Maynard (incumbent)	3,213	60.8
Republican	Sabrina Grace	1,378	26.1
Republican	Wesley Blankenship	692	13.1
Total votes		5,283	100
General election
Republican	Mark Maynard (incumbent)		
Democratic	Tiffany Clemins		
Total votes			

== Historical election results ==
=== 2020 ===
2020 West Virginia Senate election, District 6
Primary election
Party	Candidate	Votes	%
Republican	Chandler Swope (incumbent)	6,536	72.3
Republican	Wesley Blankenship	2,502	27.7
Total votes		9,038	100
General election
Republican	Chandler Swope (incumbent)	33,682	100
Total votes		33,682	100
Republican hold			

=== 2018 ===
2018 West Virginia Senate election, District 6
Primary election
Party	Candidate	Votes	%
Republican	Mark Maynard (incumbent)	3,209	61.0
Republican	Wesley Blankenship	2,048	39.0
Total votes		5,257	100
General election
Republican	Mark R. Maynard (incumbent)	17,536	61.5
Democratic	Charles Sammons	10,972	38.5
Total votes		28,508	100
Republican hold			

=== 2016 ===
2016 West Virginia Senate election, District 6
Primary election
Party	Candidate	Votes	%
Democratic	Rocky Seay	8,618	64.6
Democratic	Brandon Barker	4,715	35.4
Total votes		13,333	100
General election
Republican	Chandler Swope	20,776	57.1
Democratic	Rocky Seay	15,606	42.9
Total votes		36,382	100
Republican hold			

=== 2014 ===
2014 West Virginia Senate election, District 6
Party	Candidate	Votes	%
Republican	Mark Maynard	11,620	50.8
Democratic	Truman Chafin (incumbent)	11,245	49.2
Total votes		22,865	100
Republican gain from Democratic			

=== 2012 ===
2012 West Virginia Senate election, District 6
Primary election
Party	Candidate	Votes	%
Democratic	Mark Wills (incumbent)	6,768	52.1
Democratic	Mike Mitchem	6,216	47.9
Total votes		12,984	100
General election
Republican	Bill Cole	18,598	53.3
Democratic	Mark Wills (incumbent)	16,307	46.7
Total votes		34,905	100
Republican gain from Democratic			

=== Federal and statewide results ===
Year	Office	Results
2020	President	Trump 79.4 – 19.5%
2020	Senate	Capito 77.8 – 20.1%
2020	Governor	Justice 76.3 – 20.8%
2018	Senate	Morrisey 54.1 – 42.9%
2016	President	Trump 77.7 – 19.1%
2016	Governor	Cole 48.3 – 46.7%
