= Jeff Mullins (politician) =

American politician

Member of the West Virginia Senate from the 9th district
- In office January 14, 2015 – January 12, 2018
- Preceded by: Mike Green
- Succeeded by: Lynne Arvon

Personal details
- Born: June 28, 1965 (age 61) Mullens, West Virginia, U.S.
- Party: Republican
- Education: Bluefield State College (B.S.)

Jeffrey Keith Mullins is an American politician and former Republican member of the West Virginia Senate, where he represented the 9th district from January 14, 2015 until his resignation on January 12, 2018.

== Election results ==
West Virginia Senate District 9 (Position A) election, 2014
Party	Candidate	Votes	%
Republican	Jeff Mullins	14,465	56.87%
Democratic	Mike Green (incumbent)	10,970	43.13%
Total votes		25,435	100.0%
