= Rocky Fitzsimmons =

American attorney and politician

Member of the West Virginia Senate from the 1st district
- In office December 26, 2012 – December 1, 2014
- Preceded by: Orphy Klempa
- Succeeded by: Ryan Ferns

Personal details
- Born: Robert J. Fitzsimmons; March 5, 1979 (age 47) Wheeling, West Virginia, U.S.
- Party: Democratic
- Education: Washington University in St. Louis (B.S.); Wake Forest University School of Law (J.D.)
- Profession: Lawyer

Robert J. "Rocky" Fitzsimmons (born March 5, 1979) is an American attorney and politician from the state of West Virginia. A member of the Democratic Party, Fitzsimmons served in the West Virginia Senate for the 1st district.

Fitzsimmons attended Washington University in St. Louis, graduating magna cum laude with a bachelor of science degree in biomedical engineering. He enrolled at the Wake Forest University School of Law, where he received his Juris Doctor. As an attorney, he joined the Fitzsimmons Law Firm, based in Warwood, West Virginia, with other members of his family.

Fitzsimmons was appointed to the West Virginia Senate in December 2012 by Governor Earl Ray Tomblin, replacing Orphy Klempa.

On November 4, 2014, Fitzsimmons was defeated for reelection by Republican Delegate Ryan Ferns.
