= Erik Wells =

American politician (born 1967)

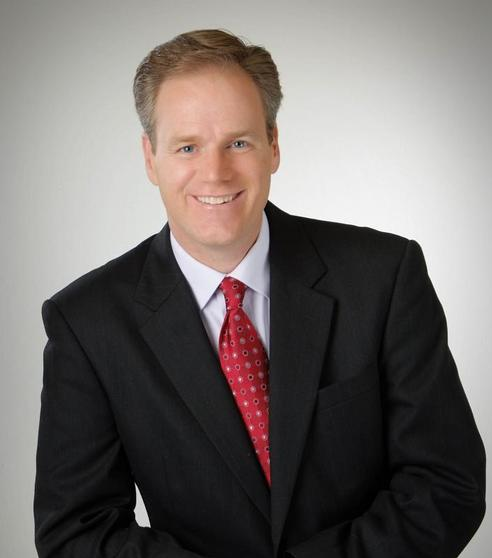

Member of the West Virginia Senate from the 8th district
- In office January 1, 2007 – December 31, 2014
- Preceded by: Steve Harrison
- Succeeded by: Ed Gaunch

Personal details
- Born: February 5, 1967 (age 59) Santa Monica, California, US
- Party: Democratic
- Spouse: Natalie Tennant
- Children: 1
- Education: Saint Vincent College (BA); West Virginia University (MA)
- Occupation: Journalist, businessman

Erik Patrick Wells (born February 5, 1967) is an American politician and former television news anchor. Wells was born and raised in California, but moved to West Virginia in the early 1990s to further his career in journalism. Wells was a popular co-anchor in the state's capital, Charleston, while on a morning show called Good Morning, West Virginia with his wife Natalie Tennant on WCHS TV.

After leaving television news, Wells and his wife decided to pursue political careers. Wells was the Democratic nominee for West Virginia's Second Congressional District. Wells campaigned aggressively against incumbent Shelley Moore Capito, claiming that she was hypocritical in only agreeing to one debate when, in the 2000 Congressional Campaign, she had urged her opponent to debate in every county in the Congressional district. Despite a stronger than expected showing by Wells, Capito maintained her seat.

In 2006, Wells was elected to the West Virginia Senate, representing the 8th district. He defeated Dave Higgins in the Democratic Primary and Charleston lawyer and former WVU football letterman Mark Plants in the general election. Wells was defeated for re-election in 2014.

Wells is married to Natalie Tennant, former Secretary of State of West Virginia. Erik and Natalie reside in Charleston and have one daughter, Delaney.
