= 2008 West Virginia gubernatorial election =

- November 4, 2008
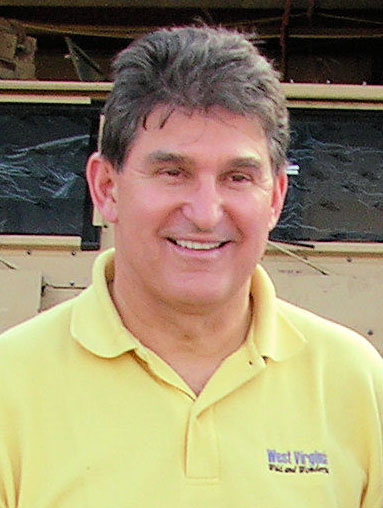

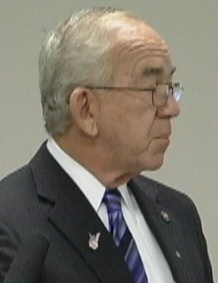
Nominee	Joe Manchin	Russ Weeks
Party	Democratic	Republican
Popular vote	492,697	181,612
Percentage	69.81%	25.73%
- County results Manchin: 50–60% 60–70% 70–80% 80–90%
Governor before election
Joe Manchin
Democratic
Elected Governor
Joe Manchin
Democratic

The 2008 West Virginia gubernatorial election took place on November 4, 2008. Incumbent Governor Joe Manchin was the Democratic nominee, challenged by Republican nominee Russ Weeks and Mountain Party candidate Jesse Johnson. Manchin won every county in the state and was reelected by the largest margin for any gubernatorial candidate in West Virginia's history. Manchin won by over 44%, even as Barack Obama, the Democratic presidential nominee, lost the state to John McCain in the concurrent presidential election.

== Party primaries ==
=== Democratic Party ===
- Mel Kessler, State Delegate
- Joe Manchin, incumbent Governor of West Virginia

Democratic primary results
Party	Candidate	Votes	%
Democratic	Joe Manchin (incumbent)	264,775	74.62
Democratic	Mel Kessler	90,074	25.38
Total votes		354,849	100.00

=== Republican Party ===
- Russ Weeks, former State Senator

Republican primary results
Party	Candidate	Votes	%
Republican	Russ Weeks	81,019	100.00
Total votes		81,019	100.00

== General election ==
=== Predictions ===
Source	Ranking	As of
The Cook Political Report	Safe D	October 16, 2008
Rothenberg Political Report	Safe D	November 2, 2008
Sabato's Crystal Ball	Safe D	November 3, 2008
Real Clear Politics	Safe D	November 4, 2008

=== Polling ===
Poll source	Date(s) administered	Sample size (Note: Key: A – all adults RV – registered voters LV – likely voters V – unclear)	Margin of error	Joe Manchin (D)	Russ Weeks (R)	Other	Undecided
Public Policy Polling (D)	October 29–30, 2008	2,128 (LV)	± 2.1%	69%	27%	–	3%
Rasmussen Reports	October 20, 2008	500 (LV)	± 4.5%	71%	21%	3%	5%

=== Results ===
West Virginia gubernatorial election, 2008
Party	Candidate	Votes	%	±%
Democratic	Joe Manchin (incumbent)	492,697	69.81%	+6.30%
Republican	Russ Weeks	181,612	25.73%	−8.27%
Mountain	Jesse Johnson	31,486	4.46%	+1.99%
Margin of victory		311,085	44.08%	+14.57%
Total votes		705,795	100%	
Democratic hold		Swing		

==== By county ====
Manchin won every county in the state.

County	Joe Manchin Democratic		Russ Weeks Republican		Jesse Johnson Mountain		Margin		Total
County	#	%	#	%	#	%	#	%	Total
Barbour	4,613	73.76%	1,426	22.80%	215	3.44%	3,187	50.96%	6,254
Berkeley	21,545	59.26%	13,288	36.55%	1,525	4.19%	8,257	22.71%	36,358
Boone	6,124	73.41%	1,729	20.73%	489	5.86%	4,395	52.69%	8,342
Braxton	4,083	76.99%	1,111	20.95%	109	2.06%	2,972	56.04%	5,303
Brooke	7,793	79.76%	1,686	17.26%	292	2.99%	6,107	62.50%	9,771
Cabell	26,970	77.81%	6,651	19.19%	1,041	3.00%	20,319	58.62%	34,662
Calhoun	1,612	66.58%	635	26.23%	174	7.19%	977	40.36%	2,421
Clay	2,316	70.89%	782	23.94%	169	5.17%	1,534	46.95%	3,267
Doddridge	1,868	61.96%	1,021	33.86%	126	4.18%	847	28.09%	3,015
Fayette	10,305	67.59%	4,306	28.24%	636	4.17%	5,999	39.35%	15,247
Gilmer	1,728	68.95%	595	23.74%	183	7.30%	1,133	45.21%	2,506
Grant	2,425	59.86%	1,508	37.23%	118	2.91%	917	22.64%	4,051
Greenbrier	9,521	69.54%	3,606	26.34%	565	4.13%	5,915	43.20%	13,692
Hampshire	5,465	66.22%	2,491	30.18%	297	3.60%	2,974	36.04%	8,253
Hancock	10,069	77.38%	2,580	19.83%	364	2.80%	7,489	57.55%	13,013
Hardy	3,777	71.37%	1,278	24.15%	237	4.48%	2,499	47.22%	5,292
Harrison	22,746	72.05%	7,514	23.80%	1,309	4.15%	15,232	48.25%	31,569
Jackson	8,233	67.23%	3,392	27.70%	621	5.07%	4,841	39.53%	12,246
Jefferson	13,563	61.91%	7,010	32.00%	1,334	6.09%	6,553	29.91%	21,907
Kanawha	55,129	68.04%	20,595	25.42%	5,303	6.54%	34,534	42.62%	81,027
Lewis	4,434	67.13%	1,921	29.08%	250	3.79%	2,513	38.05%	6,605
Lincoln	4,776	69.18%	1,755	25.42%	373	5.40%	3,021	43.76%	6,904
Logan	10,101	76.28%	2,591	19.57%	550	4.15%	7,510	56.71%	13,242
Marion	17,849	75.98%	4,610	19.62%	1,033	4.40%	13,239	56.36%	23,492
Marshall	10,555	75.80%	2,915	20.94%	454	3.26%	7,640	54.87%	13,924
Mason	8,605	80.02%	1,806	16.80%	342	3.18%	6,799	63.23%	10,753
McDowell	5,323	83.25%	933	14.59%	138	2.16%	4,390	68.66%	6,394
Mercer	14,654	70.20%	5,687	27.24%	533	2.55%	8,967	42.96%	20,874
Mineral	8,100	70.88%	3,061	26.79%	266	2.33%	5,039	44.10%	11,427
Mingo	6,353	77.38%	1,525	18.57%	332	4.04%	4,828	58.81%	8,210
Monongalia	19,546	60.61%	9,064	28.11%	3,640	11.29%	10,482	32.50%	32,250
Monroe	3,824	68.33%	1,589	28.40%	183	3.27%	2,235	39.94%	5,596
Morgan	4,318	61.05%	2,432	34.38%	323	4.57%	1,886	26.66%	7,073
Nicholas	7,080	75.31%	2,027	21.56%	294	3.13%	5,053	53.75%	9,401
Ohio	14,225	73.61%	4,422	22.88%	677	3.50%	9,803	50.73%	19,324
Pendleton	2,056	61.95%	1,127	33.96%	136	4.10%	929	27.99%	3,319
Pleasants	2,235	74.97%	658	22.07%	88	2.95%	1,577	52.90%	2,981
Pocahontas	2,479	68.03%	902	24.75%	263	7.22%	1,577	43.28%	3,644
Preston	7,078	60.77%	3,782	32.47%	787	6.76%	3,296	28.30%	11,647
Putnam	16,995	69.02%	6,622	26.89%	1,005	4.08%	10,373	42.13%	24,622
Raleigh	15,736	56.19%	11,645	41.58%	625	2.23%	4,091	14.61%	28,006
Randolph	8,149	75.76%	2,084	19.37%	524	4.87%	6,065	56.38%	10,757
Ritchie	2,503	66.01%	1,153	30.41%	136	3.59%	1,350	35.60%	3,792
Roane	3,798	68.00%	1,494	26.75%	293	5.25%	2,304	41.25%	5,585
Summers	3,535	66.75%	1,573	29.70%	188	3.55%	1,962	37.05%	5,296
Taylor	4,419	71.74%	1,477	23.98%	264	4.29%	2,942	47.76%	6,160
Tucker	2,554	73.62%	748	21.56%	167	4.81%	1,806	52.06%	3,469
Tyler	2,567	69.30%	1,001	27.02%	136	3.67%	1,566	42.28%	3,704
Upshur	6,498	72.08%	2,253	24.99%	264	2.93%	4,245	47.09%	9,015
Wayne	11,793	77.08%	3,132	20.47%	374	2.44%	8,661	56.61%	15,299
Webster	2,361	76.73%	555	18.04%	161	5.23%	1,806	58.69%	3,077
Wetzel	4,975	77.97%	1,162	18.21%	244	3.82%	3,813	59.76%	6,381
Wirt	1,652	71.18%	581	25.03%	88	3.79%	1,071	46.14%	2,321
Wood	26,769	75.38%	7,658	21.57%	1,084	3.05%	19,111	53.82%	35,511
Wyoming	4,917	65.18%	2,463	32.65%	164	2.17%	2,454	32.53%	7,544
Totals	492,697	69.81%	181,612	25.73%	31,486	4.46%	311,085	44.08%	705,795

==== Counties that flipped from Republican to Democratic ====
- Berkeley (largest municipality: Martinsburg)
- Doddridge (largest municipality: West Union)
- Grant (largest municipality: Petersburg)
