= Steve Harrison (politician) =

American politician (born 1966)

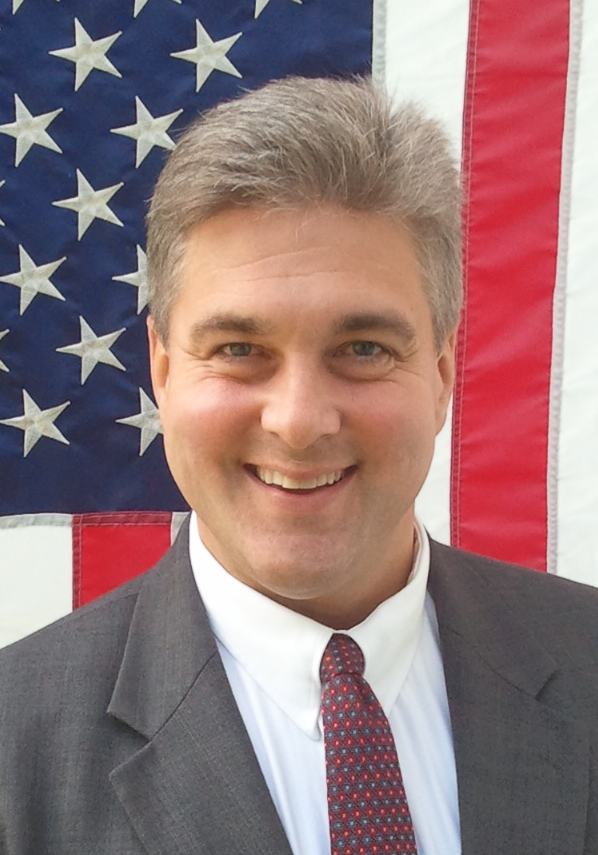

Member of the West Virginia Senate from the 8th district
- In office 2003–2006
- Preceded by: John R. Mitchell Jr.
- Succeeded by: Erik Wells

Member of the West Virginia House of Delegates from the 32nd district
- In office 1993–2002

Personal details
- Born: October 25, 1966 (age 60) Charleston, West Virginia, U.S.
- Party: Republican
- Spouse: Kristen
- Children: Benjamin; Maggie
- Education: Brown University

Steve Harrison (born October 25, 1966) is an American politician from the state of West Virginia. A member of the Republican Party, Harrison served in both the West Virginia House of Delegates and West Virginia Senate. He is currently the Clerk of the West Virginia House of Delegates.

== Career ==
Harrison served in the West Virginia House of Delegates and West Virginia Senate for a total of 14 years. He opted not to run for re-election to the state Senate in 2006. Since retiring from the state Senate, Harrison has worked for Poca Valley Bank, and played as a placekicker for a semi-professional American football team. He also coaches track and field.

Harrison lost the May 2014 primary for the United States House of Representatives, running to represent West Virginia's 2nd congressional district in the 2014 election. Incumbent Shelley Moore Capito was running for the United States Senate. Harrison had won a straw poll held by the Republican Executive Committee of Kanawha County, but ended up losing the primary.

== Personal ==
Harrison received a bachelor's degree from Brown University. He is married.
