= Craig Hart =

American politician

Member of the West Virginia Senate from the 6th district
- Incumbent
- Assumed office December 1, 2024 Serving with Mark R. Maynard
- Preceded by: Chandler Swope

Personal details
- Party: Republican

Craig A. Hart is an American politician serving as a Republican member of the West Virginia Senate for the 6th district. He is an agriculture teacher and an FFA advisor.
