= Mike Green (West Virginia politician) =

American politician (born 1973)

Member of the West Virginia Senate from the 9th district
- In office December 1, 2006 – December 1, 2014
- Preceded by: Russ Weeks
- Succeeded by: Jeff Mullins

Personal details
- Born: November 5, 1973 (age 52)
- Party: Democratic
- Spouse: Kelly Suzette Neely
- Children: Sydney Michelle; Michael Bradyn
- Education: Concord University; Mountain State University

Michael Eugene Green (born November 5, 1973) is an American politician and a former Democratic member of the West Virginia Senate representing District 9 from 2006 to 2014.

== Education ==
Green attended Concord University, Mountain State University (since closed), and the West Virginia State Police Academy.

== Elections ==
- 2010 Green was unopposed for the May 11, 2010 Democratic Primary, winning with 5,774 votes, and won the November 2, 2010 General election with 14,757 votes (57.7%) against Republican nominee James Mullins.
- 2006 To challenge District 9 incumbent Republican Senator Russ Weeks, Green won the three-way 2006 Democratic Primary against Delegate Sally Susman and former state senator Bill Wooton and won the November 7, 2006 General election against Senator Weeks.
