= William J. Powell (attorney) =

American attorney (born 1960)

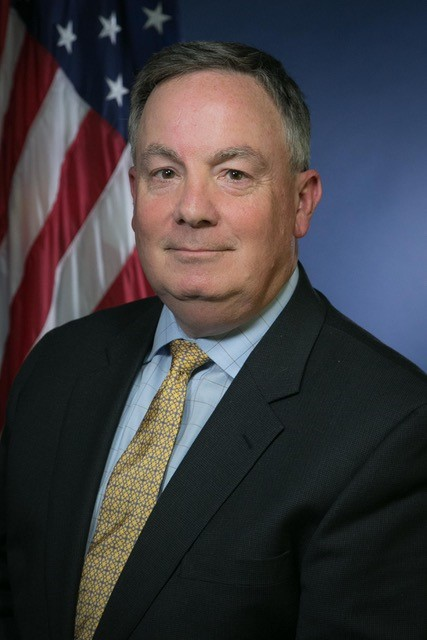

United States Attorney for the Northern District of West Virginia
- In office October 13, 2017 – February 28, 2021
- President: Donald Trump; Joe Biden
- Preceded by: William J. Ihlenfeld II
- Succeeded by: William J. Ihlenfeld II

Personal details
- Born: July 14, 1960 (age 66) Manhasset, New York
- Education: Salem International University (B.A.); West Virginia University College of Law (J.D.)

William J. Powell (born July 14, 1960) is an American attorney who served as the United States Attorney for the Northern District of West Virginia from 2017 to 2021. Prior to assuming his current role, he was the Chief Deputy Prosecuting Attorney for the Jefferson County, West Virginia Prosecuting Attorney's Office. He was previously a member at the law firm of Jackson Kelly PLLC, where his practice focused on civil litigation and white-collar criminal law. He also previously served as an Assistant United States Attorney in the Southern District of West Virginia, where he prosecuted major fraud and violent crimes. Powell was recommended for the role of U.S. Attorney by U.S. Senator Shelley Moore Capito. On February 8, 2021, he along with 55 other Trump-era attorneys were asked to resign. Powell announced his resignation on February 10, effective February 28.
