= Erikka Lynn Storch =

American politician

Erikka Storch

Member of the West Virginia House of Delegates
- In office December 1, 2010 – May 19, 2023
- Preceded by: Orphy Klempa
- Succeeded by: Diana Winzenreid
- Constituency: 3rd district (2010–2022); 4th district (2022–2023)

Personal details
- Party: Republican
- Education: Wheeling University

Erikka Lynn Storch is a former Republican member of the West Virginia House of Delegates. She represented districts in the Northern Panhandle since 2011. In 2010, she announced her intentions to seek one of the two seats being vacated by outgoing Representative Orphy Klempa and Tal Hutchins. She faced off against future Representative Ryan Ferns, businessman Dolph Santorine, and attorney Shawn Fluharty in the general election. She placed first with nearly 5,000 votes. In 2022, Storch was re-elected to the WV House of Delegates after she defeated Democratic challenger Teresa Toriseva. On May 17, 2023, Storch announced she would be resigning from the House of Delegates, taking a job with American Electric Power (AEP).
