= Ed Gaunch =

American politician

West Virginia Secretary of Commerce
- In office January 9, 2019 – July 15, 2022
- Governor: Jim Justice
- Preceded by: Woody Thrasher
- Succeeded by: James Bailey

Member of the West Virginia Senate from the West Virginia's 8th Senate district
- In office December 1, 2014 – December 1, 2018
- Preceded by: Erik Wells
- Succeeded by: Richard Lindsay

Personal details
- Born: May 12, 1947 (age 79) Madison, West Virginia, US
- Party: Republican
- Education: West Virginia State University
- Profession: Insurance agency executive

Charles Edward "Ed" Gaunch is a Republican former member of the West Virginia Senate, who represented the 8th district from January 14, 2015 until his defeat by Democrat Richard Lindsay in 2018. From 2019 to 2022 Gaunch served as the West Virginia Secretary of Commerce.

== Election results ==
West Virginia Senate District 8 (Position A) election, 2018
Party	Candidate	Votes	%
Democratic	Richard Lindsay	16,537	50.25%
Republican	Ed Gaunch (incumbent)	16,372	49.75%
Total votes		32,909	100.0%

West Virginia Senate District 8 (Position A) election, 2014
Party	Candidate	Votes	%
Republican	Ed Gaunch	14,094	52.97%
Democratic	Erik Wells (incumbent)	11,472	43.12%
Constitution	Mike Fisher	1,041	3.91%
Total votes		26,607	100.0%
