= West Virginia's 1st Senate district =

American legislative district

West Virginia's 1st State Senate district
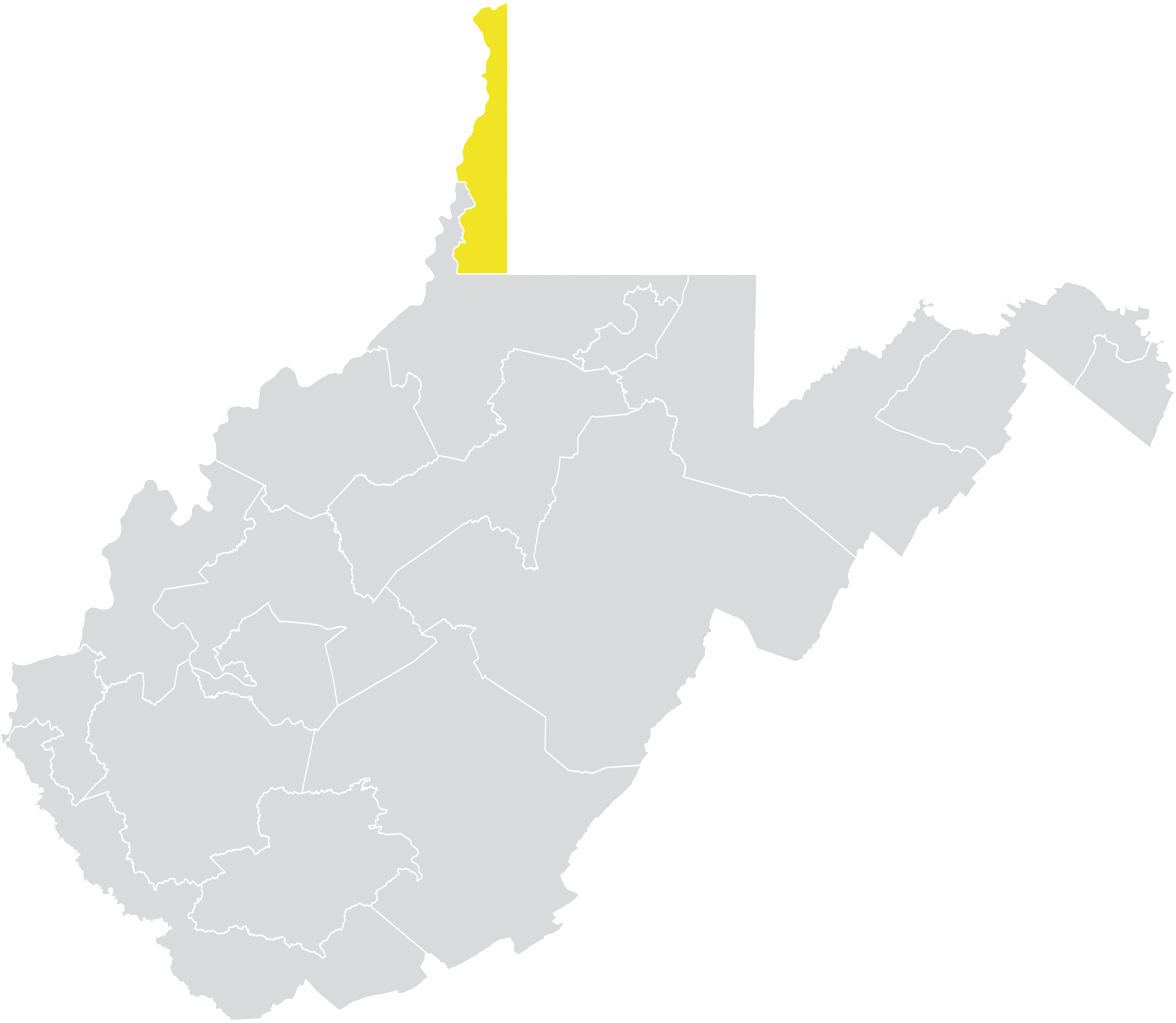
Senator
Laura Chapman; R–Wheeling
Ryan Weld; R–Wellsburg
- Demographics: 91% White; 4% Black; 1% Hispanic; 1% Asian; 2% Native American; 1% Other
- Population (2021): 102,975

West Virginia's 1st Senate district is one of 17 districts in the West Virginia Senate. It is currently represented by Republicans Ryan Weld and Laura Chapman. All districts in the West Virginia Senate elect two members to staggered four-year terms.

== Geography ==
District 1 is based in the Northern Panhandle, covering all of Brooke, Hancock, and Ohio Counties and parts of Marshall County. It includes the communities of Wheeling, Chester, New Cumberland, Weirton, Follansbee, Wellsburg, West Liberty, and Bethlehem.

The district is located entirely within West Virginia's 2nd congressional district, and overlaps with all or part of the 1st through 7th districts of the West Virginia House of Delegates. It borders the states of Ohio and Pennsylvania.

== Recent election results ==
=== 2024 ===
2024 West Virginia Senate election, District 1
Primary election
Party	Candidate	Votes	%
Republican	Ryan Weld (incumbent)	8,342	64.9
Republican	Scott Adams	4,513	35.1
Total votes		12,855	100.0
General election
Republican	Ryan Weld (incumbent)	37,739	100.0
Total votes		37,739	100.0
Republican hold			

=== 2022 ===
2022 West Virginia Senate election, District 1
Primary election
Party	Candidate	Votes	%
Democratic	Randy Swartzmiller	3,520	53.3
Democratic	Owens Brown (incumbent)	3,088	46.7
Total votes		6,608	100
Republican	Laura Chapman	5,619	69.5
Republican	Judi Varner Meyer	2,466	30.5
Total votes		8,085	100.0
General election
Republican	Laura Chapman	18,746	60.5
Democratic	Randy Swartzmiller	12,258	39.5
Total votes		31,004	100.0
Republican gain from Democratic			

== Historical election results ==
=== 2020 ===
2020 West Virginia Senate election, District 1
Primary election
Party	Candidate	Votes	%
Republican	Ryan Weld (incumbent)	7,283	64.1
Republican	Jack Newbrough	4,081	35.9
Total votes		11,364	100
General election
Republican	Ryan Weld (incumbent)	23,844	53.0
Democratic	Randy Swartzmiller	21,137	47.0
Total votes		44,981	100
Republican hold			

=== 2018 ===
2018 West Virginia Senate election, District 1
Party	Candidate	Votes	%
Democratic	William J. Ihlenfeld II	18,450	52.9
Republican	Ryan Ferns (incumbent)	16,438	47.1
Total votes		34,888	100
Democratic gain from Republican			

=== 2016 ===
2016 West Virginia Senate election, District 1
Party	Candidate	Votes	%
Republican	Ryan Weld	21,191	51.1
Democratic	Jack Yost (incumbent)	20,303	48.9
Total votes		41,494	100
Republican gain from Democratic			

=== 2014 ===
2014 West Virginia Senate election, District 1
Party	Candidate	Votes	%
Republican	Ryan Ferns	13,762	51.8
Democratic	Rocky Fitzsimmons (incumbent)	12,821	48.2
Total votes		26,583	100
Republican gain from Democratic			

=== 2012 ===
2012 West Virginia Senate election, District 1
Party	Candidate	Votes	%
Democratic	Jack Yost (incumbent)	22,661	57.4
Republican	Pat McGeehan	16,850	42.6
Total votes		39,511	100
Democratic hold			

=== Federal and statewide results ===
Year	Office	Results
2020	President	Trump 68.0 – 30.4%
2020	Senate	Capito 70.7 – 26.9%
2020	Governor	Justice 64.0 – 31.1%
2018	Senate	Manchin 51.2 – 45.0%
2016	President	Trump 67.2 – 27.2%
2016	Governor	Justice 45.9 – 45.5%
