= Mitch Carmichael =

American politician (born 1960)

President of the West Virginia Senate Lieutenant Governor of West Virginia
- In office January 11, 2017 – January 13, 2021
- Governor: Jim Justice
- Preceded by: Bill Cole
- Succeeded by: Craig Blair

Secretary of the West Virginia Department of Economic Development
- In office May 27, 2021 – October 17, 2024
- Governor: Jim Justice
- Preceded by: Office established
- Succeeded by: Mike Graney

Majority Leader of the West Virginia Senate
- In office January 14, 2015 – January 11, 2017
- Preceded by: John Unger
- Succeeded by: Ryan Ferns

Member of the West Virginia Senate from the 4th district
- In office January 9, 2013 – January 13, 2021 Serving with Eric Tarr
- Preceded by: Karen Facemyer
- Succeeded by: Amy Grady

Member of the West Virginia House of Delegates from the 12th district
- In office January 12, 2001 – January 9, 2013
- Preceded by: Karen Facemyer
- Succeeded by: Steve Westfall

Personal details
- Born: Mitch Brian Carmichael; April 15, 1960 (age 66) Charleston, West Virginia, U.S.
- Party: Republican
- Education: Marshall University (BBA)

Mitchell Carmichael (born April 15, 1960) is an American politician. He is a former Republican member of the West Virginia Senate representing District 4 from 2012 until his defeat in 2020. Prior to his service in the Senate, Carmichael served in the West Virginia House of Delegates representing District 12 from 2000 through 2012. Carmichael was also a candidate for Governor of West Virginia in the 2011 West Virginia gubernatorial special election. As President of the state Senate from January 2017 to January 2021, he held the title Lieutenant Governor of West Virginia. After his defeat in 2020, Governor Jim Justice appointed Carmichael as West Virginia's economic development director.

== Elections ==
- 2020: In the June 2020 Republican primary, Carmichael lost his bid for re-nomination to Amy Nichole Grady, an elementary school teacher who challenged Carmichael amid a state political battle over teacher pay. Grady won 39% of the vote to Carmichael's 35%.

2020 West Virginia Senate election, District 4 Republican Primary
Primary election
Party	Candidate	Votes	%
Republican	Amy Grady	6,528	39.12%
Republican	Mitch Carmichael (incumbent)	5,810	34.82%
Republican	Jim Butler	4,349	26.06%
Total votes		16,687	100.0%

- 2016: In the May 2016 Republican primary, Majority Leader Carmichael faced criticism from pro-union and pro-family groups based on a variety of votes and legislation. He was challenged by Dustin Lewis, a union pipeline worker, who he beat 59.5% to 40.5%. Carmichael then faced personal injury attorney Brian Prim in the general election, who he beat by a narrow 51% to 49% to a win a second term in the senate.

West Virginia Senate District 4 General election, 2016
Party	Candidate	Votes	%
Republican	Mitch Carmichael (incumbent)	22,032	51.05%
Democratic	Brian Prim	21,123	48.95%
Total votes		43,155	100.0%

- West Virginia Senate District 4 Republican primary, 2016
  Primary election
  Party	Candidate	Votes	%
  Republican	Mitch Carmichael (incumbent)	8,442	59.49%
  Republican	Dustin Lewis	5,749	40.51%
  Total votes		14,191	100.0%
- 2012: When District 4 Senator Karen Facemyer retired and left a district seat open, Carmichael was unopposed in the May 8, 2012 Republican Primary, winning with 8,432 votes. He then won the November 6, 2012 General election with 20,951 votes (52.69%) against Democratic nominee Jackson County, West Virginia Sheriff Mike Bright.

West Virginia Senate District 4 General election, 2012
Party	Candidate	Votes	%
Republican	Mitch Carmichael	20,951	52.69%
Democratic	Mike Bright	18,815	47.31%
Total votes		39,766	100.0%

- 2011: When incumbent Democratic Governor Joe Manchin left his position for the United States Senate, Carmichael ran in the eight-way May 14, 2011 Republican Primary, but lost to Bill Maloney; Maloney lost the October 4, 2011 special election to state Senator Earl Ray Tomblin.

2011 West Virginia Gubernatorial Special Election Republican primary
Party	Candidate	Votes	%
Republican	Bill Maloney	27,871	45.0
Republican	Betty Ireland	19,027	30.7
Republican	Clark Barnes	5,891	9.5
Republican	Mark Sorsaia	3,177	5.1
Republican	Larry Faircloth	2,400	3.9
Republican	Mitch Carmichael	2,073	3.3
Republican	Ralph Clark	1,164	1.9
Republican	Cliff Ellis	283	0.5
Total votes		61,886	100

- 2010: Carmichael and returning 2008 Democratic challenger Jo Boggess Phillips were both unopposed for their May 11, 2010 primaries, setting up a rematch; Carmichael won the November 2, 2010 General election with 3,383 votes (50.9%) against Phillips in his closest election to date.
- 2008: Carmichael was unopposed for the 2008 Republican Primary, and won the November 4, 2008 General election with 4,454 votes (53.1%) against Democratic nominee Jo Boggess Phillips.
- 2006: Carmichael was challenged in the 2006 Republican Primary but won. He then won the November 7, 2006 General election with 4,063 votes (62.5%) against Democratic nominee Steve Nicholas.
- 2004: Carmichael was unopposed for the 2004 Republican Primary, and won the November 2, 2004 General election with 5,944 votes (67.5%) against Democratic nominee Corbon Siders.
- 2002: Carmichael was unopposed for the 2002 Republican Primary, and won the November 5, 2002 General election with 3,969 votes (65.8%) against Democratic nominee Carroll Jett, who had run for the seat in 1998.
- 2000: When House District 12 Republican Delegate Karen Facemyer ran for the West Virginia Senate and left the seat open, Carmichael won the three-way 2000 Republican Primary with 1,016 votes (41.7%). He then won the November 7, 2000 General election with 4,584 votes (59.3%) against Democratic nominee Mike Dunlap.

Political offices
Preceded by Bill Cole	President of the West Virginia Senate; 2017–2021	Succeeded by Craig Blair
