= Rollan Roberts =

American politician

Member of the West Virginia Senate from the 9th district
- Incumbent
- Assumed office January 9, 2019 Serving with Brian Helton
- Preceded by: Lynne Arvon

Personal details
- Born: August 23, 1953 (age 72) Redding, California, U.S.
- Party: Republican
- Children: Rollan Roberts II
- Education: Pensacola Christian College (BA)

Rollan A. Roberts (born August 23, 1953) is an American politician and pastor serving as a Republican member of the West Virginia Senate for the 9th district. He assumed office on January 9, 2019.

== Early life and education ==
Roberts was born in Redding, California. He earned a Bachelor of Arts degree in Bible and Biblical languages from Pensacola Christian College.

== Career ==
Since 1988, Roberts has been an administrator at Victory Baptist Academy in Raleigh County, West Virginia. He was elected to the West Virginia Senate in January 2019. During the 2019–2020 legislative session, Roberts served as vice chair of the Senate Enrolled Bills Committee. In the 2021–2022 session, he is vice chair of the Senate Education Committee and chair of the Senate Workforce Committee.

In January 2023, his son, Rollan Roberts II, announced his candidacy for the 2024 United States presidential election.
