= William J. Ihlenfeld II =

American lawyer and politician (born 1972)

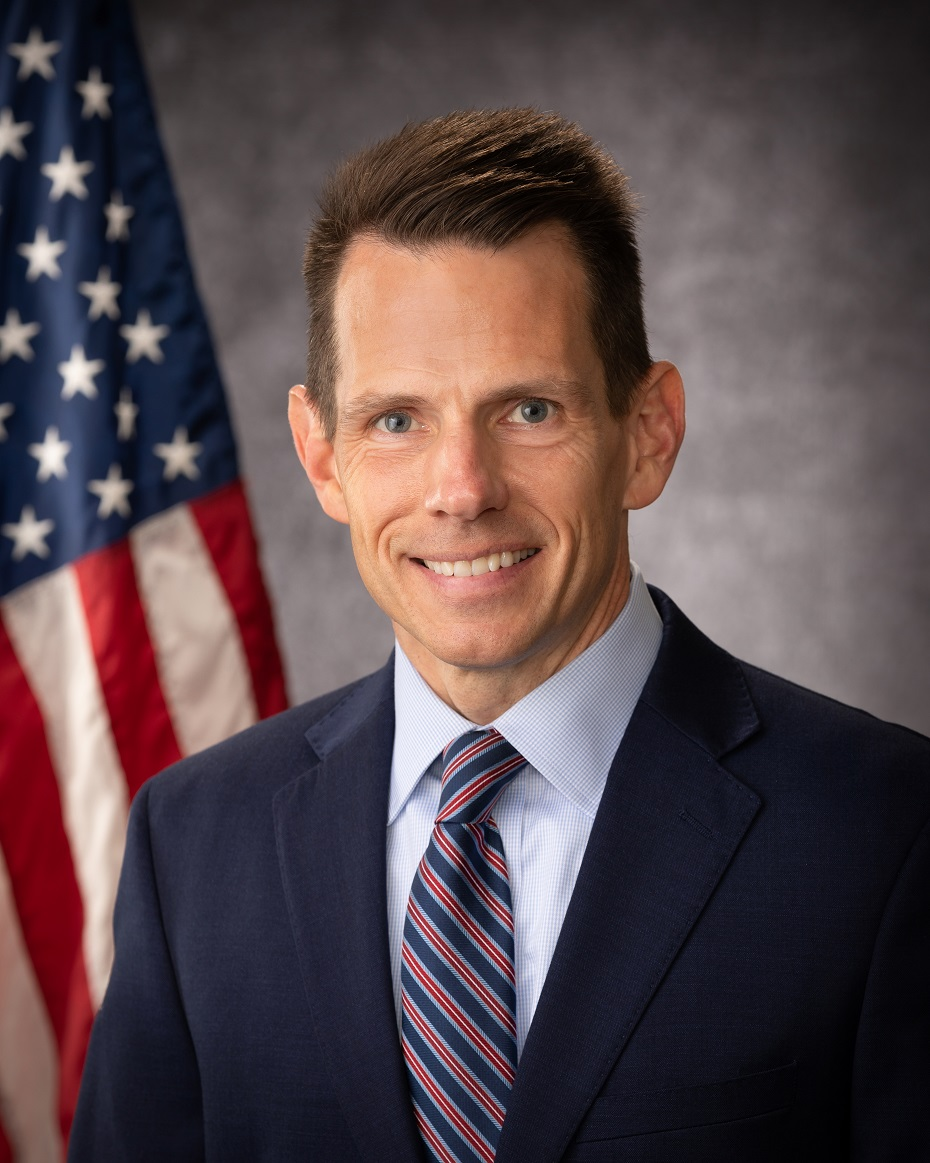

United States Attorney for the Northern District of West Virginia
- In office October 12, 2021 – January 20, 2025
- President: Joe Biden
- Preceded by: William J. Powell
- In office August 2010 – December 31, 2016
- President: Barack Obama
- Preceded by: Sharon Lynn Potter
- Succeeded by: William J. Powell

Member of the West Virginia Senate from the 1st district
- In office December 1, 2018 – October 5, 2021
- Preceded by: Ryan Ferns
- Succeeded by: Owens Brown

Personal details
- Born: William Joseph Ihlenfeld II; May 5, 1972 (age 54) Wheeling, West Virginia, U.S.
- Party: Democratic
- Education: Ohio University (BS); West Virginia University (JD)

William Joseph Ihlenfeld II (born May 5, 1972) is an American attorney and politician from West Virginia. He is a Democrat. He had served as the United States Attorney for the Northern District of West Virginia. He previously served in the same capacity under Barack Obama. He was a state senator in the West Virginia Senate for the 1st district from 2018 to 2021.

== Education ==
Ihlenfeld received his Bachelor of Science from the Ohio University and his Juris Doctor from West Virginia University College of Law.

== Career ==
Ihlenfeld served as an assistant prosecuting attorney for the Brooke County Office of the Prosecuting Attorney from 2007 to 2010 and as an assistant prosecuting attorney and the chief Assistant Prosecutor for the Ohio County Office of the Prosecuting Attorney from 1997 to 2007.

=== West Virginia Senate ===
In February 2018, he filed paperwork to run as a candidate for the West Virginia Senate. Ihlenfeld won uncontested in the primary, and faced State Senator Ryan Ferns in the general election. Ihlenfeld and Ferns debated twice throughout the span of their campaigns. On November 7, Ihlenfeld defeated Ferns, 53% - 47%.

== U.S. attorney ==
=== First term ===
On May 27, 2010, he was nominated by President Barack Obama to be the United States attorney for the Northern District of West Virginia. His nomination was reported favorably by the Judiciary Committee on July 29, 2010, and he was confirmed by the United States Senate by voice vote on August 5, 2010. On December 19, 2016, he announced his resignation effective December 31.

In 2017, Ihlenfeld received the Outstanding Service in Law Enforcement Award from the FBI Citizens Academy Alumni Association.

=== Second term ===
On August 10, 2021, President Joe Biden nominated Ihlenfeld to be the United States attorney for the Northern District of West Virginia. His nomination was sent to the United States Senate the same day. On September 30, 2021, his nomination was reported out of committee by voice vote. On October 5, 2021, his nomination was confirmed in the United States Senate by voice vote. He was sworn into office for a second term on October 12, 2021, by Judge Tom Kleeh.

== Election results ==
West Virginia Senate District 1 (Position A) election, 2018
Party	Candidate	Votes	%
Democratic	William J. Ihlenfeld II	18,450	52.88%
Republican	Ryan Ferns (incumbent)	16,438	47.12%
Total votes		34,888	100.0%

Legal offices
Preceded by Sharon Lynn Potter	United States Attorney for the Northern District of West Virginia; 2010–2016	Succeeded by William J. Powell
Preceded by William J. Powell	United States Attorney for the Northern District of West Virginia; 2021–2025	Succeeded by Matthew L. Harvey
