= Mark Drennan =

American politician

Member of the West Virginia Senate from the 4th district
- In office September 5, 2017 – December 1, 2018
- Preceded by: Mike Hall
- Succeeded by: Eric Tarr

Personal details
- Born: February 29, 1972 (age 54) Charleston, West Virginia, U.S.
- Party: Republican
- Education: West Virginia State University (B.A., psychology); West Virginia University (MSW)

Mark Drennan is a former Republican member of the West Virginia Senate representing the 4th district. Drennan was appointed by Governor Jim Justice to fill the seat previously held by Mike Hall, taking office on September 11, 2017. He lost renomination in 2018 to Eric Tarr.

== Early life ==
Mark Drennan was born February 29, 1972, in Charleston to Emmett G. Drennan (1943-1997) and Patricia Thomas Drennan (1944-2011). He has one brother, Eric Drennan (1975-).

== Marriage and children ==
In 2006, Mark married Sarah Nicolls Drennan and the two have sons Alec (2008-) and Connor (2011-).
