= West Virginia's 4th Senate district =

American legislative district

West Virginia's 4th State Senate district
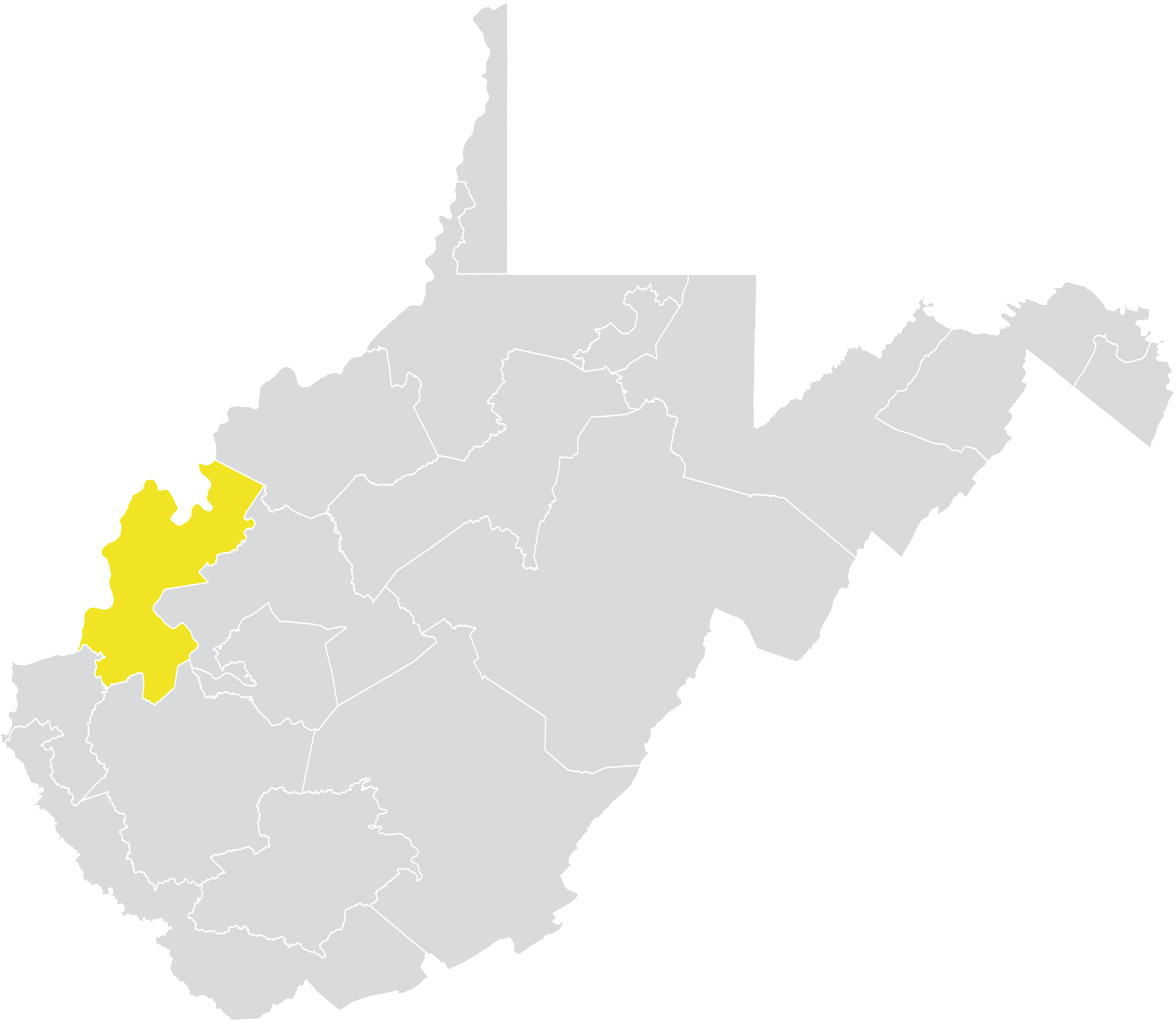
Senator
Eric Tarr; R–Scott Depot
Amy Grady; R–Leon
- Demographics: 94% White; 1% Black; 1% Hispanic; 1% Asian; 2% Native American
- Population (2021): 104,885

West Virginia's 4th Senate district is one of 17 districts in the West Virginia Senate. It is currently represented by Republicans Eric Tarr and Amy Grady. All districts in the West Virginia Senate elect two members to staggered four-year terms.

== Geography ==
District 4 is based in Jackson County, Mason County, and parts of Putnam and Roane Counties to the north of Charleston. It includes the communities of Spencer, Ravenswood, Ripley, Point Pleasant, New Haven, Hurricane, Winfield, and Teays Valley.

The district overlaps with West Virginia's 1st congressional district, and with the 11th, 12th, 13th, 14th, 15th, 22nd, 38th districts of the West Virginia House of Delegates. It borders the state of Ohio.

== Recent election results ==
=== 2024 ===
2024 West Virginia Senate election, District 4
Primary election
Party	Candidate	Votes	%
Republican	Amy Grady (incumbent)	12,955	100.0
Total votes		12,955	100.0
Democratic	Dwayne Russell	4,217	100.0
Total votes		4,217	100.0
General election
Republican	Amy Grady (incumbent)	33,655	74.79
Democratic	Dwayne Russell	11,343	25.21
Total votes		44,998	100.0
Republican hold			

=== 2022 ===
West Virginia's 4th Senate district, 2022
Party	Candidate	Votes	%
Republican	Eric Tarr (incumbent)	21,059	100.0
Total votes		21,059	100.0
Republican hold			

== Historical election results ==
=== 2020 ===
2020 West Virginia Senate election, District 4
Primary election
Party	Candidate	Votes	%
Republican	Amy Grady	6,528	39.1
Republican	Mitch Carmichael (incumbent)	5,810	34.8
Republican	Jim Butler	4,349	26.1
Total votes		16,687	100
General election
Republican	Amy Grady	33,409	70.7
Democratic	Bruce Ashworth	11,950	25.3
Libertarian	Loyd Butcher	1,904	4.0
Total votes		47,263	100
Republican hold			

=== 2018 ===
2018 West Virginia Senate election, District 4
Primary election
Party	Candidate	Votes	%
Republican	Eric Tarr	4,994	54.8
Republican	Mark Drennan (incumbent)	4,126	45.2
Total votes		9,120	100
General election
Republican	Eric Tarr	18,885	51.8
Democratic	Brian Prim	13,583	37.2
Independent	Amy Nichole Grady	4,005	11.0
Total votes		36,473	100
Republican hold			

=== 2016 ===
2016 West Virginia Senate election, District 4
Primary election
Party	Candidate	Votes	%
Republican	Mitch Carmichael (incumbent)	8,442	59.5
Republican	Dustin Lewis	5,749	40.5
Total votes		14,191	100
Democratic	Brian Prim	6,999	58.8
Democratic	Bruce Ashworth	4,910	41.2
Total votes		11,909	100
General election
Republican	Mitch Carmichael (incumbent)	22,032	51.1
Democratic	Brian Prim	21,123	48.9
Total votes		43,155	100
Republican hold			

=== 2014 ===
2014 West Virginia Senate election, District 4
Party	Candidate	Votes	%
Republican	Mike Hall (incumbent)	22,561	100
Total votes		22,561	100
Republican hold			

=== 2012 ===
2012 West Virginia Senate election, District 4
Primary election
Party	Candidate	Votes	%
Democratic	Mike Bright	6,085	67.5
Democratic	Marla Ingels	2,936	32.5
Total votes		9,021	100
General election
Republican	Mitch Carmichael	20,951	52.7
Democratic	Mike Bright	18,815	47.3
Total votes		39,766	100
Republican hold			

=== Federal and statewide results ===
Year	Office	Results
2020	President	Trump 72.0 – 26.2%
2020	Senate	Capito 74.7 – 23.0%
2020	Governor	Justice 66.9 – 29.7%
2018	Senate	Manchin 49.3 – 47.4%
2016	President	Trump 72.7 – 22.7%
2016	Governor	Justice 52.1 – 41.0%
