= Richard Lindsay (West Virginia politician) =

American politician

Member of the West Virginia Senate from the 8th district
- In office January 9, 2019 – December 1, 2022
- Preceded by: Ed Gaunch
- Succeeded by: Mark Hunt

Personal details
- Born: January 29, 1977 (age 49) Charleston, West Virginia, U.S.
- Party: Democratic
- Education: Wingate University (B.A.); George Washington University (M.A.); Appalachian School of Law (J.D.)
- Profession: Lawyer

Richard David Lindsay II (born January 29, 1977) is an American former politician who served as a Democratic member of the West Virginia Senate, representing the 8th district from January 9, 2019, until his term ended on January 12, 2023.

== Election results ==
West Virginia Senate District 8 (Position A) election, 2018
Party	Candidate	Votes	%
Democratic	Richard Lindsay	16,537	50.25%
Republican	Ed Gaunch (incumbent)	16,372	49.75%
Total votes		32,909	100.0%
