= Lynne Arvon =

American politician (born 1961)

Member of the West Virginia Senate from the 9th district
- In office January 23, 2018 – December 1, 2018
- Preceded by: Jeff Mullins
- Succeeded by: Rollan Roberts

Member of the West Virginia House of Delegates from the 31st district
- In office January 12, 2013 – January 23, 2018

Personal details
- Born: May 29, 1961 (age 65) South Charleston, West Virginia, U.S.
- Party: Republican
- Education: Marshall University (A.A.); West Virginia State University (B.S.)
- Profession: Medical office manager

Karen Lynne Arvon (born May 29, 1961 in South Charleston, West Virginia) is an American politician and was a Republican member of the West Virginia Senate representing the 9th district. Prior to this, Arvon represented the 31st district in the West Virginia House of Delegates since January 12, 2013.

== Education ==
Arvon earned her associate degree from Marshall University and her BS in business administration from West Virginia State University.

== Private career ==
Arvon is the office manager for MyCare Inc., her husband's direct primary care facility.

== Political career ==
With district 31 incumbent Democratic Representative Meshea Poore running in district 37 due to redistricting, Arvon was unopposed for the May 8, 2012 Republican primary, winning with 715 votes, and won the November 6, 2012 general election with 3,191 votes (51.2%) against Democratic nominee Clyde McKnight.

Arvon was appointed by Gov. Jim Justice to the district 9 Senate seat in January, 2018. The seat had previously been held by Jeff Mullins, who resigned on January 12, 2018, citing business and family obligations.

== Personal life ==
Avron is married to Matthew Arvon, with whom she has three children.
