= David Stover (politician) =

American politician (born 1954)

Member of the West Virginia Senate from the 9th district
- In office December 1, 2020 – December 1, 2024
- Preceded by: Sue Cline
- Succeeded by: Brian Helton

Personal details
- Born: David Allen Stover; December 16, 1954 (age 71) Mullens, West Virginia, U.S.
- Party: Republican
- Education: Glenville State College (BA)

David Allen Stover (born December 16, 1954) is an American politician who served as a member of the West Virginia Senate from the 9th district. Elected in November 2020, he assumed office on December 1, 2020.

== Early life and education ==
Stover was born in Mullens, West Virginia in 1954. After graduating from Mullens High School, he attended the West Virginia University Institute of Technology and earned a Bachelor of Arts degree in education and history from Glenville State College in 1977.

== Career ==
From 1977 to 1998, Stover worked as a public school teacher. Since 2005, he has served as a court clerk for the Wyoming County Courthouse and Jail. Stover was elected to the West Virginia Senate in November 2020 and assumed office on December 1, 2020. Stover served as vice chair of the Senate Natural Resources Committee and Senate Interstate Cooperation Committee. Stover did not seek re-election in 2024.
