= Mark R. Maynard =

American politician

Member of the West Virginia Senate from the 6th district
- Incumbent
- Assumed office January 14, 2015 Serving with Craig A. Hart
- Preceded by: Truman Chafin

Personal details
- Born: May 14, 1972 (age 54) Huntington, West Virginia, U.S.
- Party: Republican
- Education: Marshall University (B.B.A.)

Mark R. Maynard is a Republican member of the West Virginia Senate, representing the 6th district since January 14, 2015.

He is the owner of a used car lot and towing business. During the 2016 U.S. presidential election, Maynard co-chaired Donald Trump's presidential campaign in West Virginia.

== Election results ==
West Virginia Senate District 6 (Position A) election, 2018
Party	Candidate	Votes	%
Republican	Mark R. Maynard (incumbent)	17,536	61.51%
Democratic	Charles E. Sammons	10,972	38.49%
Total votes		28,508	100.0%

West Virginia Senate District 6 (Position A) election, 2014
Party	Candidate	Votes	%
Republican	Mark R. Maynard	11,620	50.82%
Democratic	H. Truman Chafin (incumbent)	11,245	49.18%
Total votes		22,865	100.0%

West Virginia Senate District 6 (Position B) election, 2008
Party	Candidate	Votes	%
Democratic	John Pat Fanning (incumbent)	17,603	65.57%
Republican	Mark R. Maynard	9,242	34.43%
Total votes		26,845	100.0%
