= Brian Helton =

American politician

Member of the West Virginia Senate from the 9th district
- Incumbent
- Assumed office January 14, 2025 Serving with Rollan Roberts
- Preceded by: David Stover

Personal details
- Born: July 27, 1970 (age 55) Beckley, West Virginia, U.S.
- Party: Republican
- Spouse: Emily

Brian Helton (born July 27, 1970) is an American politician serving as a Republican member of the West Virginia Senate for the 9th district. He took the oath of office on January 14, 2025. He graduated from college with a Bachelor of Science in business administration, and is a business owner. Helton is a Baptist.
