= Doug Facemire =

American politician (born 1961)

Member of the West Virginia Senate from the 12th district
- In office December 1, 2008 – November 30, 2020
- Preceded by: William R. Sharpe Jr.
- Succeeded by: Patrick S. Martin

Personal details
- Born: August 22, 1961 (age 64) Gassaway, West Virginia, U.S.
- Party: Democratic
- Spouse: Tammy
- Children: 3

Douglas Eugene Facemire (born August 22, 1961) is an American who served as a member of the West Virginia Senate representing District 12 from 2008 until 2020.

== Education ==
Facemire graduated from Braxton County High School.

== Career ==
Facemire is the previous owner of the grocery store Glenville Foodland. In 2008, he defeated incumbent state senator Doug Stalnaker in the Democratic primary. The race was the most expensive of the cycle, with Facemire reporting $130,400 in expenses, $98,401 of which being a personal loan from Facemire himself. In the general election, he was unopposed.

In 2012, Facemire was unopposed in both the primary and general election. He was unopposed in the 2016 primary, and won the general election only 107 votes ahead of Republican Franklin D. Cornette, II.

He left office on November 30, 2020 after losing the general election.
