= Ryan Ferns =

American politician (born 1982)

Majority Leader of the West Virginia Senate
- In office January 11, 2017 – January 9, 2019
- Preceded by: Mitch Carmichael
- Succeeded by: Tom Takubo

Member of the West Virginia Senate from the 1st district
- In office January 14, 2015 – January 9, 2019
- Preceded by: Rocky Fitzsimmons
- Succeeded by: William J. Ihlenfeld II

Member of the West Virginia House of Delegates from the 3rd district
- In office January 12, 2011 – January 14, 2015

Personal details
- Born: Ryan James Ferns; December 2, 1982 (age 43) Wheeling, West Virginia, U.S.
- Party: Democratic (Before 2013); Republican (2013–present)
- Education: Wheeling Jesuit University (BS, DPT)

Ryan James Ferns (born December 2, 1982) is an American politician from the state of West Virginia. He was a member of the West Virginia Senate for the 1st district. Ferns was defeated for reelection in 2018 by Democratic candidate William J. Ihlenfeld II.

== Biography ==
Ferns was first elected to the West Virginia House of Delegates in 2010, as a member of the Democratic Party.

On April 20, 2012, he was arrested for drunken driving in Wheeling, West Virginia. On April 23, 2012, he entered a guilty plea and paid a $500 fine. Ferns' blood-alcohol level was 0.22, nearly three times West Virginia's legal limit. That year, he was reelected by 280 votes. He switched his allegiance to the Republican Party in November 2013.

In 2014, he challenged Democrat Rocky Fitzsimmons in an election to the West Virginia Senate. Ferns narrowly defeated Fitzsimmons. He was chosen as the West Virginia Senate Majority Leader in December 2016.

In 2018, Ferns was defeated for reelection by former U.S. Attorney for the Northern District of West Virginia William J. Ihlenfeld II.

== Electoral history ==
West Virginia Senate District 1 (Position A) election, 2018
Party	Candidate	Votes	%
Democratic	William J. Ihlenfeld II	18,450	52.88%
Republican	Ryan Ferns (incumbent)	16,438	47.12%
Total votes		34,888	100.0%

West Virginia Senate District 1 (Position A) election, 2014
Party	Candidate	Votes	%
Republican	Ryan Ferns	13,762	51.77%
Democratic	Rocky Fitzsimmons (incumbent)	12,821	48.23%
Total votes		26,583	100.0%

West Virginia House District 3 election, 2012
Party	Candidate	Votes	%
Republican	Erikka Lynn Storch (incumbent)	10,705	37.64%
Democratic	Ryan Ferns (incumbent)	7,431	26.13%
Democratic	Shawn Fluharty	7,151	25.15%
Republican	Larry Tighe	3,150	11.08%
Total votes		28,437	100.0%

West Virginia House District 3 election, 2010
Party	Candidate	Votes	%
Republican	Erikka Lynn Storch	5,410	28.23%
Democratic	Ryan Ferns	4,958	25.87%
Republican	Dolph Santorine	4,518	23.58%
Democratic	Shawn Fluharty	4,277	22.32%
Total votes		19,163	100.0%

== See also ==
- List of American politicians who switched parties in office

West Virginia Senate
Preceded by Mitch Carmichael	Majority Leader of the West Virginia Senate; 2017–2019	Succeeded by Tom Takubo
