= West Virginia's 9th Senate district =

American legislative district

West Virginia's 9th State Senate district
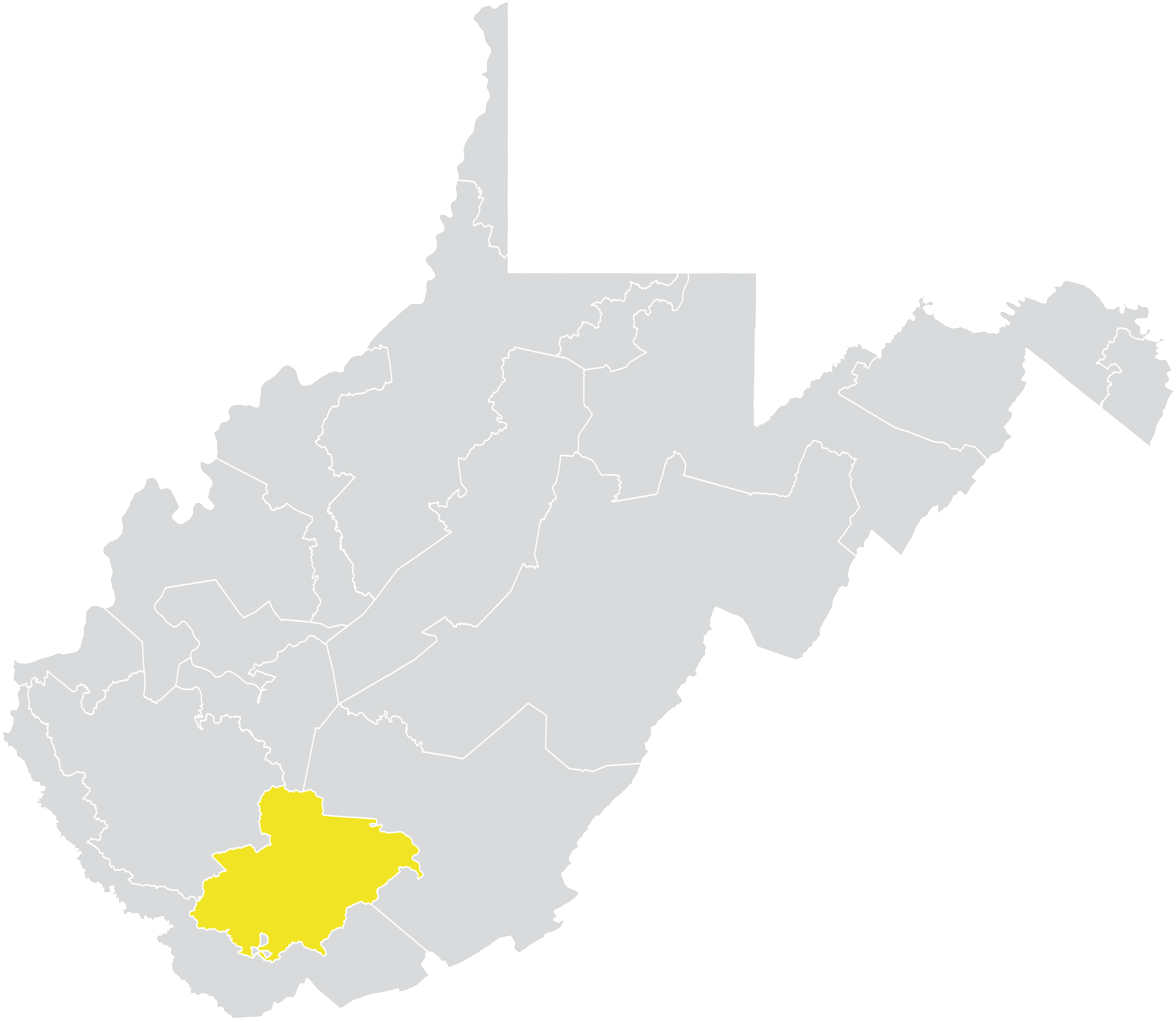
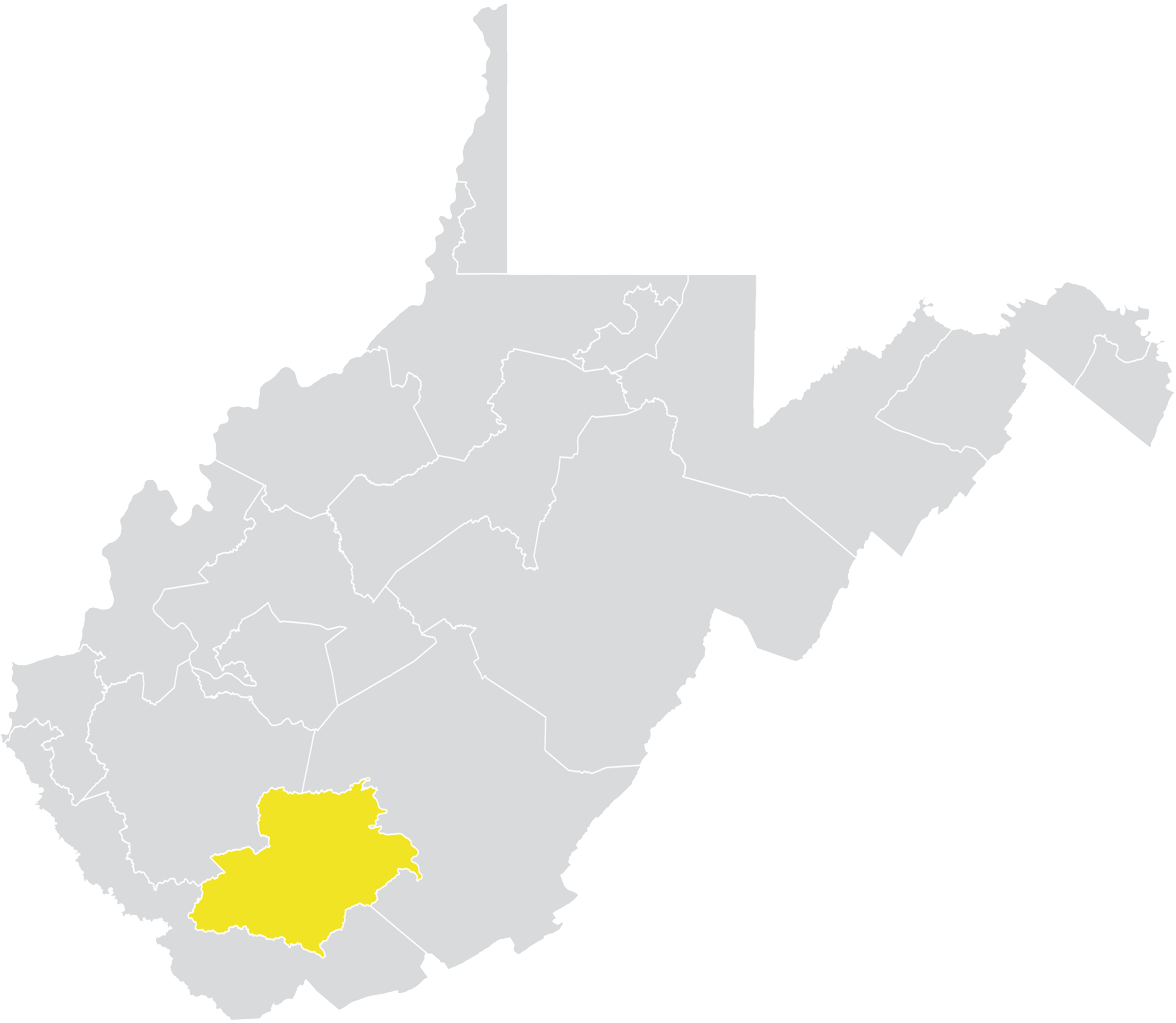
Senator
Rollan Roberts; R–Beaver
Brian Helton; R–Mount Hope
- Demographics: 89% White; 6% Black; 1% Hispanic; 1% Asian; 1% Other
- Population (2017): 101,315

West Virginia's 9th Senate district is one of 17 districts in the West Virginia Senate. It is currently represented by Republicans Rollan Roberts and Brian Helton. All districts in the West Virginia Senate elect two members to staggered four-year terms.

== Geography ==
District 9 is based in Raleigh and Wyoming Counties in Southern West Virginia, also covering a small portion of northern McDowell County. Communities in the district include Beckley, Mabscott, Sophia, Beaver, Bradley, Coal City, Crab Orchard, Daniels, MacArthur, Prosperity, Shady Spring, Stanaford, Mullens, and Oceana.

The district is located entirely within West Virginia's 3rd congressional district, and overlaps with the 21st, 24th, 25th, 26th, 27th, 28th, 29th, 30th, 31st, and 32nd districts of the West Virginia House of Delegates.

== Recent election results ==
=== 2024 ===
2024 West Virginia Senate election, District 9
Primary election
Party	Candidate	Votes	%
Republican	Brian Helton	11,061	100.0
Total votes		11,061	100.0
Democratic	Christy Cardwell	4,510	100.0
Total votes		4,510	100.0
General election
Republican	Brian Helton	30,734	75.0
Democratic	Christy Cardwell	10,240	25.0
Total votes		40,974	100
Republican hold			

=== 2022 ===
2022 West Virginia Senate election, District 9
Primary election
Party	Candidate	Votes	%
Republican	Rollan Roberts (incumbent)	4,561	51.6
Republican	John Kelly	4,272	48.4
Total votes		8,833	100
General election
Republican	Rollan Roberts (incumbent)	18,540	78.1
Libertarian	Kari Woodson	5,194	21.9
Total votes		23,734	100

== Historical election results ==
=== 2020 ===
2020 West Virginia Senate election, District 9
Primary election
Party	Candidate	Votes	%
Republican	David Stover	6,834	60.0
Republican	Sue Cline (incumbent)	4,559	40.0
Total votes		11,393	100
General election
Republican	David Stover	35,665	100
Total votes		35,665	100
Republican hold			

=== 2018 ===
2018 West Virginia Senate election, District 9
Primary election
Party	Candidate	Votes	%
Republican	Rollan Roberts	3,384	52.9
Republican	Lynne Arvon (incumbent)	3,017	47.1
Total votes		6,401	100
Democratic	William Wooton	3,649	43.4
Democratic	John Quesenberry	2,171	25.8
Democratic	Steve Davis	1,731	20.6
Democratic	Wayne Williams	850	10.1
Total votes		8,401	100
General election
Republican	Rollan Roberts	16,111	54.1
Democratic	William Wooton	13,686	45.9
Total votes		29,797	100
Republican hold			

=== 2016 ===
2016 West Virginia Senate election, District 9
Party	Candidate	Votes	%
Republican	Sue Cline (incumbent)	18,861	51.8
Democratic	Mike Goode	17,545	48.2
Total votes		36,406	100
Republican hold			

=== 2014 ===
2014 West Virginia Senate election, District 9
Party	Candidate	Votes	%
Republican	Jeff Mullins	14,465	56.9
Democratic	Mike Green (incumbent)	10,970	43.1
Total votes		25,435	100
Republican gain from Democratic			

=== 2012 ===
2012 West Virginia Senate election, District 9
Primary election
Party	Candidate	Votes	%
Democratic	Daniel Hall	5,303	51.0
Democratic	Richard Browning (incumbent)	5,086	49.0
Total votes		10,389	100
General election
Democratic	Daniel Hall	18,502	53.7
Republican	Epp Cline	15,970	46.3
Total votes		34,472	100
Democratic hold			

=== Federal and statewide results ===
Year	Office	Results
2020	President	Trump 76.7 – 21.9%
2016	President	Trump 76.3 – 20.1%
2014	Senate	Capito 65.1 – 32.0%
2012	President	Romney 72.4 – 25.9%
2012	Senate	Manchin 60.4 – 37.3%
2012	Governor	Maloney 49.6 – 47.5%
