= Amy Grady =

American politician

Member of the West Virginia Senate from the 4th district
- Incumbent
- Assumed office December 1, 2020 Serving with Eric Tarr
- Preceded by: Mitch Carmichael

Personal details
- Born: Amy Nichole Doss; October 15, 1979 (age 46)
- Party: Republican
- Spouse: Jack L. Grady
- Education: Marietta College B.Ed,

Amy Nichole Grady (née Doss; born October 15, 1979) is an American teacher and politician who has served as the junior West Virginia State Senator from the 4th district since 2020. Grady is a Republican. Grady has served as the chair of the West Virginia Senate Education Committee since 2022.

== Early life, education, and career ==
Grady is the daughter of Addie Roberts. She received her Bachelor of Education degree from Marietta College and West Virginia University and served as a teacher before running for office.

== Elections ==
Grady, a teacher, was inspired to run for office after participating in the 2018 West Virginia teachers' strike. Her later opponent in the primary, Lt. Governor and President of the West Virginia Senate, Mitch Carmichael, had opposed pay raises for teachers and supported charter schools. Her role in the strike led her to seek the office.

On her website, Grady described herself as a "Pro-life, Pro-2nd Amendment conservative teacher who is fed up with self-serving elected officials." Her campaign was self-funded and Carmichael outraised her by more than 50:1 in the primary.

Grady won the three-way primary election with 39.12% of the vote, defeating Carmichael by a margin of fewer than 1000 votes. Carmichael conceded the evening of the election and agreed to support Grady in the general.

Grady defeated Democrat Bruce Ashworth in the 2020 general election with 70.69% of the vote.

== Tenure ==
=== Committee assignments ===
- Education (chair)
- Health and Human Resources (Vice Chair)
- Agriculture and Rural Development
- Judiciary
- Military
- Natural Resources

=== Education ===
Grady spoke in support of and voted for House Bill 2013, a bill that would allow more public funds to be used by parents sending their children to private schools.

Grady voted for Senate Bill 680, a bill that would make it harder for school staff to be given raises.

=== Transgender rights ===
As a member of the education committee, Grady was the lead sponsor of Senate Bill 341, a bill that would require transgender athletes to compete in sports associated with their biological sex.

=== DC statehood ===
With many of her fellow Senators, Grady signed onto a resolution requesting West Virginia Senators and Congresspeople to oppose bills that would allow statehood for the District of Columbia.

== Personal life ==
Grady is married to Jack L. Grady and has three children. She is a Christian.
