= Eric Tarr =

American politician

Member of the West Virginia Senate from the 4th district
- Incumbent
- Assumed office January 9, 2019 Serving with Amy Grady
- Preceded by: Mark Drennan

Personal details
- Born: September 10, 1972 (age 53)
- Party: Republican
- Education: University of Kentucky (BS); University of Charleston (MBA); Simmons University (DPT)
- Occupation: Physical therapist; businessman; politician

Eric J. Tarr (born September 10, 1972) is a Republican member of the West Virginia Senate, representing the 4th district since January 9, 2019. Tarr beat appointed Senator Mark Drennan in the 2018 GOP primaries, becoming one of three challengers to beat GOP incumbents.

== Legislature ==
Tarr has previously served as co-chairman of the Senate's Joint Legislative Oversight Committee on Health and Human Resources, co-chairman of Joint Health Committee, co-chairman of the Joint Committee on Technology, and vice chairman of the Senate Health committee.

In June 2021, Tarr spoke out against critical race theory in West Virginia, despite the lack of evidence that it is currently taught in state public schools.

== Personal ==
Tarr is CEO of Generations Physical Therapy Centers in the Charleston and Huntington area. Tarr is the former President of the West Virginia Physical Therapy Association.

== Election results ==
West Virginia Senate District 4 (Position A) election, 2018
Party	Candidate	Votes	%
Republican	Eric Tarr	18,885	51.78%
Democratic	Brian Prim	13,583	37.24%
Independent	Amy Nichole Grady	4,005	10.98%
Total votes		36,473	100.0%

West Virginia Senate District 4 (Position A) Republican primary election, 2018
Party	Candidate	Votes	%
Republican	Eric Tarr	4,994	54.76%
Republican	Mark Drennan (incumbent)	4,126	45.24%
Total votes		9,120	100.0%
