= Sue Cline =

American politician in West Virginia (died 2021)

Member of the West Virginia Senate from the 9th district
- In office January 22, 2016 – December 1, 2020

Personal details
- Born: 1945 or 1946
- Died: December 29, 2021 (aged 75)
- Party: Republican

Naomi Sue Cline (1945 or 1946 – December 29, 2021) was an American politician who served as a member of the West Virginia Senate for the 9th district from 2016 to 2020.

== Personal life ==
Born in 1945 or 1946, Cline died on December 29, 2021, at the age of 75.

== Election results ==
West Virginia Senate District 9 (Position B) election, 2016
Party	Candidate	Votes	%
Republican	Sue Cline (incumbent)	18,861	51.81%
Democratic	D. Michael "Mike" Goode	17,545	48.19%
Total votes		36,406	100.0%

West Virginia House District 25 election, 2014
Party	Candidate	Votes	%
Democratic	Linda Goode Phillips (incumbent)	2,110	51.14%
Republican	Sue Cline	2,016	48.86%
Total votes		4,126	100.0%
