= Mike Romano (politician) =

American politician

Member of the West Virginia Senate from the 12th district
- In office December 1, 2014 – December 1, 2022
- Preceded by: Sam Cann
- Succeeded by: Ben Queen

Personal details
- Born: January 18, 1961 (age 65) Clarksburg, West Virginia, U.S.
- Party: Democratic
- Education: West Virginia University (BS, BA, JD)
- Profession: Attorney

Mike Romano is an American politician and former Democratic member of the West Virginia Senate, having representing the 12th district from 2014 to 2022. Prior to his election to the Senate, Romano was a county commissioner in Harrison County. In 2022, Romano retired from the Senate to run for Harrison County commissioner again, but was defeated by incumbent David Hinkle.

== Election results ==
2018: After running in the 2018 Democratic Primary unopposed, Romano faced small business owner Waymond Cork in the November general election. Romano beat Cork 55-45% to earn a second term.

West Virginia Senate District 12 (Position A) general election, 2018
Party	Candidate	Votes	%
Democratic	Mike Romano (incumbent)	18,919	54.51%
Republican	Waymond Cork II	15,791	45.49%
Total votes		34,710	100.0%

2014: Harrison County Commissioner Mike Romano challenged appointed-incumbent Senator Sam Cann in the May 13, 2014 Democratic Primary. Cann had been appointed by Governor Earl Ray Tomblin to the Senate seat in January 2013 after Joe Minard stepped down to become Senate clerk. Cann had served 18 years in the House of Delegates prior to the appointment. After beating Cann 56-44%, Romano beat former state Delegate Mike Queen in the November general election.

West Virginia Senate District 12 (Position A) general election, 2014
Party	Candidate	Votes	%
Democratic	Mike Romano	14,036	49.99%
Republican	Michael L. "Mike" Queen	11,850	42.20%
Libertarian	Patrick Shawn Smith	2,192	7.81%
Total votes		28,078	100.0%

West Virginia Senate District 12 (Position A) Democratic primary, 2014
Party	Candidate	Votes	%
Democratic	Mike Romano	7,308	55.65%
Democratic	Samuel J Cann (incumbent)	5,823	44.35%
Total votes		13,131	100.0%
