= Chandler Swope =

American politician

Member of the West Virginia Senate from the 6th district
- In office December 1, 2016 – December 1, 2024
- Preceded by: Bill Cole
- Succeeded by: Craig A. Hart

Personal details
- Born: August 14, 1942 (age 84) Welch, West Virginia, U.S.
- Party: Republican
- Education: Ohio State University (B.S.)

Chandler Swope (also referred to in official West Virginia Senate proceedings as William Chandler Swope Sr.) is an American politician who served as a Republican member of the West Virginia Senate from 2016 to 2024, representing the 6th district. He lost renomination in the Republican primary on May 14, 2024, to Craig A. Hart.

== Early life and education ==
Swope was born August 14, 1942, in Welch, West Virginia. He received a Bachelor of Science in industrial management from Ohio State University.

== Legislative career ==
Swope was elected to the West Virginia Senate in 2016 and served two terms. During his tenure, he held committee leadership roles that included chair of the Senate Economic Development Committee (84th and 85th Legislatures) and chair of the Senate Workforce Committee (83rd Legislature), as well as vice chair roles on several committees, including Transportation and Infrastructure (83rd Legislature) and Government Organization (84th and 85th Legislatures).

After the May 2024 primary, Swope filed a challenge regarding Mingo County primary-election results; he later withdrew the challenge after an assurance that the Secretary of State's office would provide additional training to local election officials and poll workers.

== Election results ==
West Virginia Senate District 6 (Position B) election, 2016
Party	Candidate	Votes	%
Republican	Chandler Swope	20,776	57.11%
Democratic	Rockwell "Rocky" Seay	15,606	42.89%
Total votes		36,382	100.0%
