= 2016 West Virginia Commissioner of Agriculture election =

- November 8, 2016
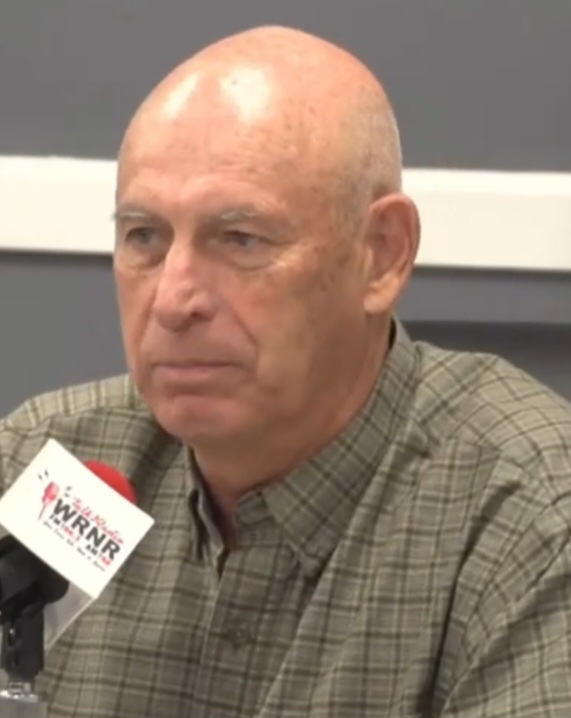

Nominee	Kent Leonhardt	Walt Helmick	Buddy Guthrie
Party	Republican	Democratic	Libertarian
Popular vote	321,560	274,191	68,502
Percentage	48.41%	41.28%	10.31%
- County results Leonhardt: 40–50% 50–60% 60–70% Helmick: 40–50% 50–60% 60–70%
Commissioner of Agriculture before election
Walt Helmick
Democratic
Elected Commissioner of Agriculture
Kent Leonhardt
Republican

The 2016 West Virginia Commissioner of Agriculture election was held on November 8, 2016, to elect the West Virginia Commissioner of Agriculture, concurrently with elections for president of the United States, the U.S. House of Representatives, governor, and other state and local elections.

Incumbent Democratic commissioner Walt Helmick, the only remaining Democratic agriculture commissioner in the United States at the time of the election, lost re-election to Republican state senator Kent Leonhardt in a rematch of the 2012 election for the same office. Libertarian candidate Buddy Guthrie received over 10% of the vote, the highest third-party vote share of any single candidate in West Virginia in 2016.

== Democratic primary ==
=== Candidates ===
==== Nominee ====
- Walt Helmick, incumbent agriculture commissioner (2013–present)

=== Results ===
Democratic primary results
Party	Candidate	Votes	%
Democratic	Walt Helmick (incumbent)	194,220	100.00
Total votes		194,220	100.00

== Republican primary ==
=== Candidates ===
==== Nominee ====
- Kent Leonhardt, state senator from the 2nd district (2014–present) and nominee for agriculture commissioner in 2012

=== Results ===
Republican primary results
Party	Candidate	Votes	%
Republican	Kent Leonhardt	147,782	100.00
Total votes		147,782	100.00

== General election ==
=== Endorsements ===
Walt Helmick (D)

Newspapers and other media

- Charleston Gazette-Mail
- The Exponent Telegram

Labor unions

- West Virginia AFL–CIO
- International Brotherhood of Boilermakers, Iron Ship Builders, Blacksmiths, Forgers and Helpers
Kent Leonhardt (R)

Newspapers and other media

- The Journal

Organizations

- West Virginia Farm Bureau

=== Results ===
2016 West Virginia Commissioner of Agriculture election
Party	Candidate	Votes	%
Republican	Kent Leonhardt	321,560	48.41
Democratic	Walt Helmick (incumbent)	274,191	41.28
Libertarian	Buddy Guthrie	68,502	10.31
Total votes		664,253	100.00
Republican gain from Democratic			
