= 2008 West Virginia Commissioner of Agriculture election =

- November 4, 2008
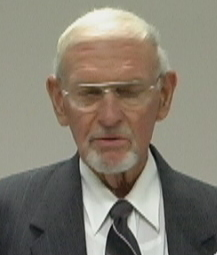

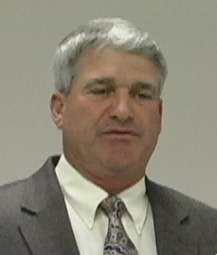
Nominee	Gus Douglass	Mike Teets
Party	Democratic	Republican
Popular vote	352,242	311,496
Percentage	53.07%	46.93%
- County results Douglass: 50–60% 60–70% 70–80% Teets: 50–60% 60–70% 70–80%
Commissioner of Agriculture before election
Gus Douglass
Democratic
Elected Commissioner of Agriculture
Gus Douglass
Democratic

The 2008 West Virginia Commissioner of Agriculture election was held on November 4, 2008, to elect the West Virginia Commissioner of Agriculture, concurrently with the 2008 U.S. presidential election, as well as elections to the United States Senate, U.S. House of Representatives, governor, and other state and local elections.

Incumbent Democratic commissioner Gus Douglass won re-election against Hardy County commissioner Mike Teets, a Republican.

== Democratic primary ==
=== Candidates ===
==== Nominee ====
- Gus Douglass, incumbent agriculture commissioner (1993–present, 1965–1989)

==== Eliminated in primary ====
- Oscar Wayne Casto, farmer

=== Results ===
Democratic primary results
Party	Candidate	Votes	%
Democratic	Gus Douglass (incumbent)	193,766	63.08
Democratic	Oscar Wayne Casto	113,400	36.92
Total votes		307,166	100.0

== Republican primary ==
=== Candidates ===
==== Nominee ====
- Mike Teets, commissioner of Hardy County

==== Eliminated in primary ====
- Lawrence Beckerle, farmer

=== Results ===
Republican primary results
Party	Candidate	Votes	%
Republican	Mike Teets	57,332	64.80
Republican	Lawrence Beckerle	31,146	35.20
Total votes		88,478	100.0

== General election ==
=== Post-primary endorsements ===
Mike Teets (R)

Newspapers and other media

- Times West Virginian

=== Polling ===
Poll source	Date(s) administered	Sample size (Note: Key: A – all adults RV – registered voters LV – likely voters V – unclear)	Margin of error	Gus Douglass (D)	Mike Teets (R)	Undecided
Public Policy Polling	October 29–30, 2008	2,128 (LV)	± 2.1%	50%	41%	9%

=== Results ===
2008 West Virginia Commissioner of Agriculture election
Party	Candidate	Votes	%
Democratic	Gus Douglass (incumbent)	352,242	53.07
Republican	Mike Teets	311,496	46.93
Total votes		663,738	100.0
Democratic hold			
