= 2024 West Virginia Commissioner of Agriculture election =

- November 5, 2024
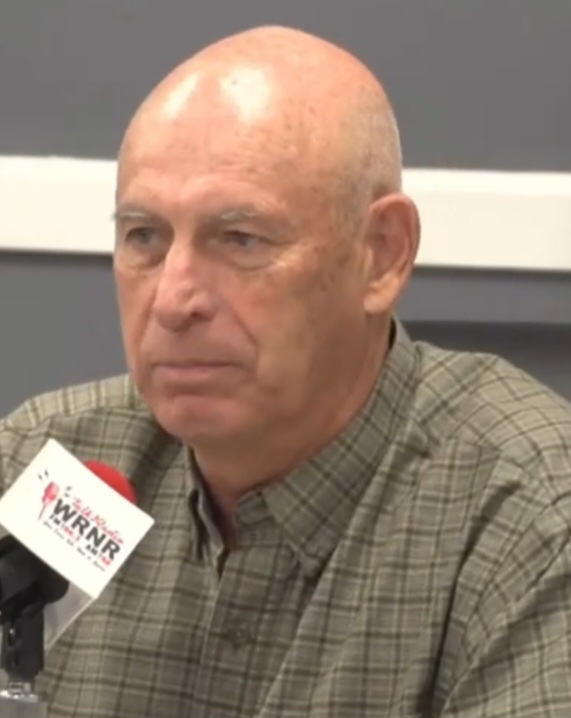

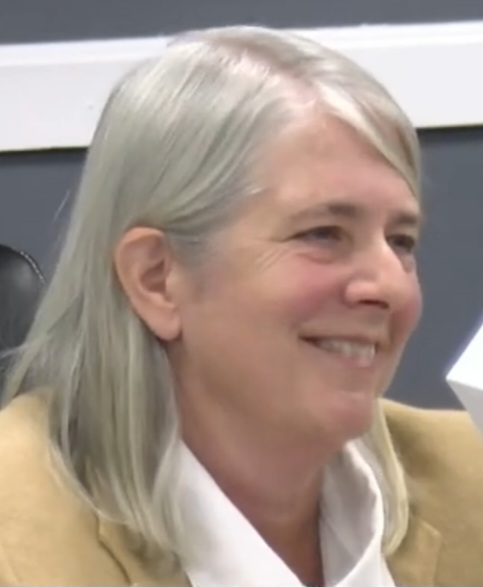
Nominee	Kent Leonhardt	Deborah Stiles
Party	Republican	Democratic
Popular vote	490,964	219,131
Percentage	69.14%	30.86%
- Leonhardt: 50–60% 60–70% 70–80% 80–90%
Commissioner of Agriculture before election
Kent Leonhardt
Republican
Elected Commissioner of Agriculture
Kent Leonhardt
Republican

The 2024 West Virginia Commissioner of Agriculture election took place on November 5, 2024, to elect the next commissioner of agriculture. Incumbent Republican commissioner Kent Leonhardt was re-elected with 69% of the vote.

== Republican primary ==
=== Candidates ===
==== Nominee ====
- Kent Leonhardt, incumbent commissioner of agriculture

==== Eliminated in primary ====
- Joshua Higginbotham, former state delegate from the 13th district (2016–2021)
- Roy Ramsey, farmer and candidate for commissioner of agriculture in 2020

=== Results ===
Results by county: Leonhardt: 40–50%; 50–60%; 60–70%; 70–80%; Higginbotham: 30–40%; 40–50%; 50–60%; Ramsey: 30–40%; 50–60%; 60–70%; Tie: 30–40%

Republican primary results
Party	Candidate	Votes	%
Republican	Kent Leonhardt (incumbent)	97,958	50.82%
Republican	Joshua Higginbotham	57,950	30.07%
Republican	Roy Ramsey	36,831	19.11%
Total votes		192,739	100.00%

== Democratic primary ==
=== Candidates ===
==== Nominee ====
- Deborah Stiles, farmer

=== Results ===
Democratic primary results
Party	Candidate	Votes	%
Democratic	Deborah Stiles	84,557	100.00%
Total votes		84,557	100.00%

== General election ==
=== Results ===
2024 West Virginia Commissioner of Agriculture election
Party	Candidate	Votes	%
Republican	Kent Leonhardt (incumbent)	490,964	69.14%
Democratic	Deborah Stiles	219,131	30.86%
Total votes		710,095	100.00%
Republican hold			

==== By county ====
County	Kent Leonhardt Republican		Deborah Stiles Democratic		Margin		Total
County	#	%	#	%	#	%	Total
Barbour	4,470	74.08%	1,564	25.92%	2,906	48.16%	6,034
Berkeley	35,906	67.42%	17,350	32.58%	18,556	34.84%	53,256
Boone	5,265	71.18%	2,132	28.82%	3,133	42.36%	7,397
Braxton	3,492	70.82%	1,439	29.18%	2,053	41.63%	4,931
Brooke	6,124	67.89%	2,896	32.11%	3,228	35.79%	9,020
Cabell	19,711	60.50%	12,871	39.50%	6,840	20.99%	32,582
Calhoun	1,954	74.87%	656	25.13%	1,298	49.73%	2,610
Clay	2,206	74.25%	765	25.75%	1,441	48.50%	2,971
Doddridge	2,386	85.52%	404	14.48%	1,982	71.04%	2,790
Fayette	9,758	67.39%	4,722	32.61%	5,036	34.78%	14,480
Gilmer	1,631	74.00%	573	26.00%	1,058	48.00%	2,204
Grant	4,300	85.13%	751	14.87%	3,549	70.26%	5,051
Greenbrier	10,096	71.08%	4,107	28.92%	5,989	42.17%	14,203
Hampshire	7,709	78.34%	2,132	21.66%	5,577	56.67%	9,841
Hancock	8,607	70.65%	3,575	29.35%	5,032	41.31%	12,182
Hardy	4,582	75.09%	1,520	24.91%	3,062	50.18%	6,102
Harrison	19,152	68.70%	8,724	31.30%	10,428	37.41%	27,876
Jackson	9,355	76.86%	2,816	23.14%	6,539	53.73%	12,171
Jefferson	16,260	58.54%	11,517	41.46%	4,743	17.08%	27,777
Kanawha	40,498	58.64%	28,563	41.36%	11,935	17.28%	69,061
Lewis	5,230	77.30%	1,536	22.70%	3,694	54.60%	6,766
Lincoln	4,965	75.64%	1,599	24.36%	3,366	51.28%	6,564
Logan	7,406	76.63%	2,259	23.37%	5,147	53.25%	9,665
Marion	16,047	68.15%	7,499	31.85%	8,548	36.30%	23,546
Marshall	8,941	71.51%	3,562	28.49%	5,379	43.02%	12,503
Mason	7,461	75.31%	2,446	24.69%	5,015	50.62%	9,907
McDowell	3,263	72.79%	1,220	27.21%	2,043	45.57%	4,483
Mercer	16,684	75.84%	5,316	24.16%	11,368	51.67%	22,000
Mineral	9,434	76.79%	2,852	23.21%	6,582	53.57%	12,286
Mingo	5,780	80.22%	1,425	19.78%	4,355	60.44%	7,205
Monongalia	22,424	56.80%	17,056	43.20%	5,368	13.60%	39,480
Monroe	4,865	80.32%	1,192	19.68%	3,673	60.64%	6,057
Morgan	6,493	76.49%	1,996	23.51%	4,497	52.97%	8,489
Nicholas	7,094	76.02%	2,238	23.98%	4,856	52.04%	9,332
Ohio	10,950	62.51%	6,568	37.49%	4,382	25.01%	17,518
Pendleton	2,414	76.20%	754	23.80%	1,660	52.40%	3,168
Pleasants	2,420	77.86%	688	22.14%	1,732	55.73%	3,108
Pocahontas	2,619	72.51%	993	27.49%	1,626	45.02%	3,612
Preston	9,948	73.13%	3,655	26.87%	6,293	46.26%	13,603
Putnam	18,493	72.36%	7,064	27.64%	11,429	44.72%	25,557
Raleigh	21,266	74.85%	7,145	25.15%	14,121	49.70%	28,411
Randolph	7,056	64.52%	3,880	35.48%	3,176	29.04%	10,936
Ritchie	3,173	85.00%	560	15.00%	2,613	70.00%	3,733
Roane	3,924	75.51%	1,273	24.49%	2,651	51.01%	5,197
Summers	3,553	73.50%	1,281	26.50%	2,272	47.00%	4,834
Taylor	5,177	74.16%	1,804	25.84%	3,373	48.32%	6,981
Tucker	1,896	54.62%	1,575	45.38%	321	9.25%	3,471
Tyler	2,856	82.95%	587	17.05%	2,269	65.90%	3,443
Upshur	7,070	76.05%	2,226	23.95%	4,844	52.11%	9,296
Wayne	10,121	72.39%	3,861	27.61%	6,260	44.77%	13,982
Webster	2,093	77.38%	612	22.62%	1,481	54.75%	2,705
Wetzel	4,361	76.03%	1,375	23.97%	2,986	52.06%	5,736
Wirt	1,900	80.00%	475	20.00%	1,425	60.00%	2,375
Wood	24,766	70.93%	10,150	29.07%	14,616	41.86%	34,916
Wyoming	5,359	80.09%	1,332	19.91%	4,027	60.19%	6,691
Totals	490,964	69.14%	219,131	30.86%	271,833	38.28%	710,095

Counties that flipped Democratic to Republican

- Monongalia (largest city: Morgantown)

==== By congressional district ====
Leonhardt won both congressional districts.

District	Leonhardt	Stiles	Representative
1st	70%	30%	Carol Miller
2nd	69%	31%	Alex Mooney (118th Congress)
2nd	69%	31%	Riley Moore (119th Congress)
