= 2012 West Virginia elections =

- November 6, 2012
- Registered: 1,246,559
- Turnout: 685,099; 55.0% (▲11.0%)

West Virginia's 2012 general elections were held on November 6, 2012. Primary elections were held on May 8, 2012.

== Federal ==
=== Senate ===
Incumbent Democratic U.S. Senator Joe Manchin, was re-elected, defeating token opposition in the primary, and then perennial candidate John Raese, a businessman and four-time Republican nominee for the Senate (including a challenge to Manchin in 2010), with 61% of the vote.

== State ==
=== Constitutional officers ===
==== Governor ====
Incumbent Democratic Governor Earl Ray Tomblin, who has held the position since 2010, won a full term in his own right, defeating Bill Maloney, a businessman who ran as the Republican nominee in the aforementioned 2011 special election. and two minor party candidates, winning 50% of the vote to 46%, with the minor party candidates receiving the remainder.

The results give automatic ballot access for the next four years to both the Mountain Party, (a "green" party); and the Libertarian Party, as ballot access is based on getting 1% of the vote for governor.

==== Attorney General ====
2012 West Virginia Attorney General election
- November 6, 2012
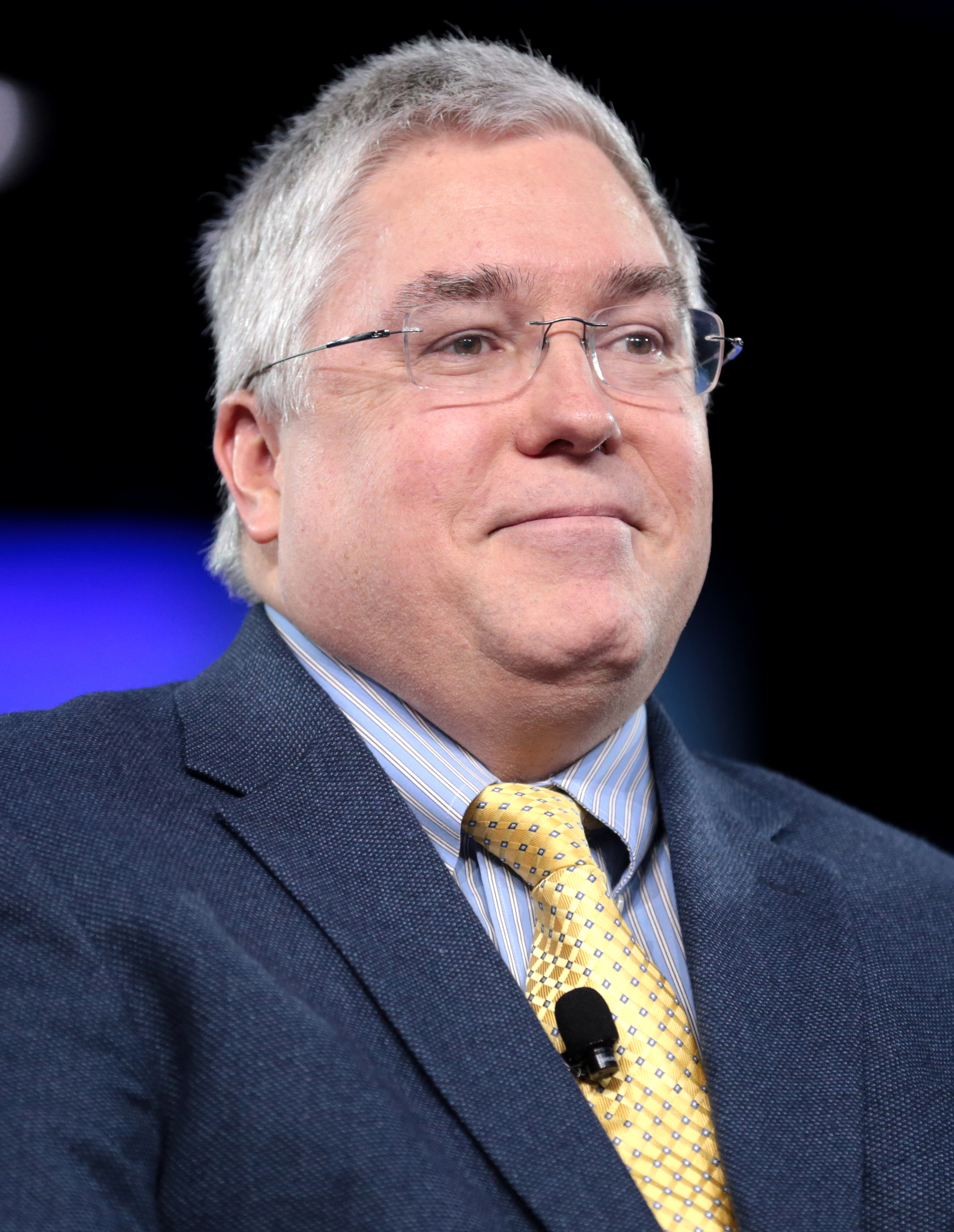

Nominee	Patrick Morrisey	Darrell McGraw
Party	Republican	Democratic
Popular vote	329,854	313,830
Percentage	51.24%	48.76%
- Morrisey: 50–60% 60–70% 70–80% McGraw: 50–60% 60–70% Tie: 50%
Attorney General before election
Darrell McGraw
Democratic
Elected Attorney General
Patrick Morrisey
Republican

Democratic incumbent Darrell McGraw was defeated by Patrick Morrisey, a lawyer specializing in health care matters, 51% to 49%.

West Virginia Attorney General Republican primary results, 2012
Party	Candidate	Votes	%
Republican	Patrick Morrisey	82,747	100.00%
Total votes		82,747	100.00%

West Virginia Attorney General Democratic primary results, 2012
Party	Candidate	Votes	%
Democratic	Darrell McGraw Jr. (incumbent)	166,643	100.00%
Total votes		166,643	100.00%

West Virginia Attorney General Election, 2012
Party	Candidate	Votes	%
Republican	Patrick Morrisey	329,854	51.24%
Democratic	Darrell McGraw Jr. (incumbent)	313,830	48.76%
Total votes		643,684	100.00%
Republican gain from Democratic			

==== Secretary of State ====
Democratic incumbent Natalie Tennant, was re-elected easily, receiving 62% of the vote over state delegate Brian Savilla. She received by far the most votes of any statewide candidate.

West Virginia Secretary of State Democratic primary results, 2012
Party	Candidate	Votes	%
Democratic	Natalie Tennant (incumbent)	171,471	100.00%
Total votes		171,471	100.00%

West Virginia Secretary of State Republican primary results, 2012
Party	Candidate	Votes	%
Republican	Brian Savilla	82,334	100.00%
Total votes		82,334	100.00%

West Virginia Secretary of State General Election, 2012
Party	Candidate	Votes	%
Democratic	Natalie Tennant (incumbent)	398,463	62.40%
Republican	Brian Savilla	240,080	37.60%
Total votes		638,543	100.00%
Democratic hold			

==== Treasurer ====
2012 West Virginia State Treasurer election
- November 6, 2012
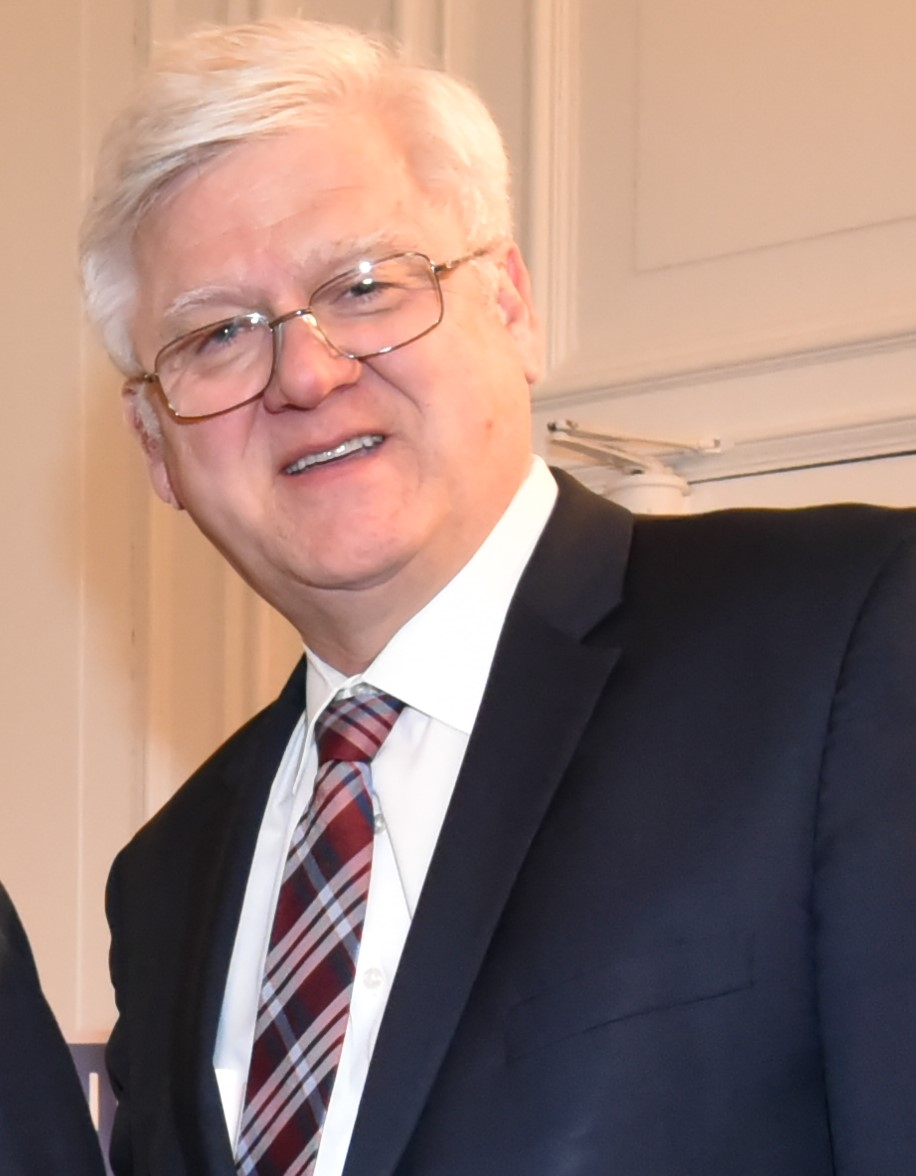

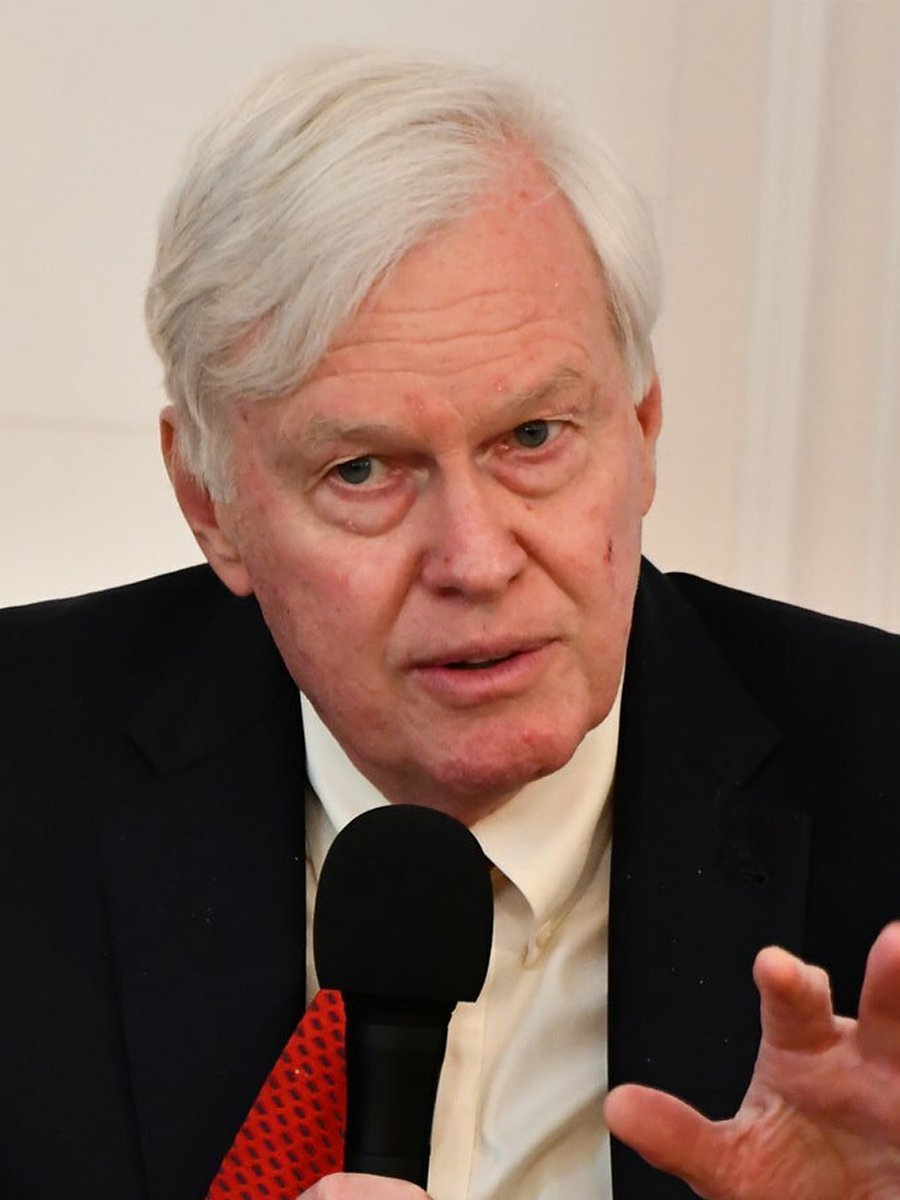
Nominee	John Perdue	Mike Hall
Party	Democratic	Republican
Popular vote	348,267	280,316
Percentage	55.41%	44.59%
- Perdue: 50–60% 60–70% 70–80% Hall: 50–60% 60–70%
State Treasurer before election
John Perdue
Democratic
Elected State Treasurer
John Perdue
Democratic

Democratic incumbent John Perdue, won reelection over State Senate Minority Leader Mike Hall.

Democratic primary
Party	Candidate	Votes	%
Democratic	John Perdue (incumbent)	160,104	100.00%
Total votes		160,104	100.00%

Republican primary
Party	Candidate	Votes	%
Republican	Mike Hall	49,433	55.57%
Republican	Stephen R. "Steve" Connolly	39,512	44.43%
Total votes		88,945	100.00%

West Virginia Treasurer General Election, 2012
Party	Candidate	Votes	%
Democratic	John Perdue (incumbent)	348,267	55.41%
Republican	Mike Hall	280,316	44.59%
Total votes		628,583	100.00%
Democratic hold			

==== Auditor ====
2012 West Virginia State Auditor election
- November 6, 2012
Nominee	Glen Gainer III	Larry V. Faircloth
Party	Democratic	Republican
Popular vote	355,610	263,959
Percentage	57.40%	42.60%
- Gainer: 50–60% 60–70% 70–80% Faircloth: 50–60% 60–70% 70–80%
State Auditor before election
Glen Gainer III
Democratic
Elected State Auditor
Glen Gainer III
Democratic

Democratic incumbent Glen Gainer III, won re-election for the last time over former state Delegate Larry Faircloth.

In April of 2016, Gainer announced he would resign before the end of his term to accept a job as President and CEO of the National White Collar Crime Center, beginning May 15. Lisa Hopkins, who had served as general counsel and deputy commissioner of securities since 2001, was appointed by Governor Earl Ray Tomblin as Gainer's replacement on May 13 and she took office 2 days later.

Democratic primary
Party	Candidate	Votes	%
Democratic	Glen Gainer III (incumbent)	158,163	100.00%
Total votes		158,163	100.00%

Republican primary
Party	Candidate	Votes	%
Republican	Larry V. Faircloth	81,917	100.00%
Total votes		81,917	100.00%

West Virginia State Auditor General Election, 2012
Party	Candidate	Votes	%
Democratic	Glen Gainer III (incumbent)	355,610	57.40%
Republican	Larry V. Faircloth	263,959	42.60%
Total votes		619,569	100.00%
Democratic hold			

==== Commissioner of Agriculture ====
2012 West Virginia Commissioner of Agriculture election
- November 6, 2012
Nominee	Walt Helmick	Kent Leonhardt
Party	Democratic	Republican
Popular vote	316,591	297,088
Percentage	51.59%	48.41%
- Helmick: 50–60% 60–70% 70–80% Leonhardt: 50–60% 60–70%
Secretary of State before election
Gus Douglass
Democratic
Elected Secretary of State
Walt Helmick
Democratic

Democratic incumbent Gus Douglass, who has held the position of state Agriculture Commissioner since 1993 (and previously held the position from 1965 to 1989), decided to retire.

State Senator Walt Helmick sought and received the Democratic nomination to succeed Douglass. He defeated Joe Messineo, a former agricultural field supervisor for the state Department of Agriculture and the USDA; Steve Miller, an assistant state Agriculture Commissioner; Sally Shepherd, a farmer; and, Bob Tabb, the deputy state Agriculture Commissioner and former state Delegate.

Kent Leonhardt, a farmer and retired Marine lieutenant colonel, received the Republican nomination. Mike Teets, a cattleman who unsuccessfully challenged Douglass in 2008, has planned to run but dropped out of the race in February 2012.

Helmick defeated Leonhardt with 52% of the vote.

Democratic primary
Party	Candidate	Votes	%
Democratic	Walt Helmick	59,376	32.88%
Democratic	Sally Shephard	44,454	24.62%
Democratic	Steve Miller	39,130	21.68%
Democratic	Joe Messineo	24,613	13.63%
Democratic	Bob Tabb	12,976	7.19%
Total votes		180,549	100.00%

=== Legislature ===
==== State Senate ====
17 of the 34 members of the West Virginia Senate were up for election. The state Senate consisted of 28 Democrats and 6 Republicans. This was the first election after the redistricting following the 2010 Census.

Democrats won 11 of the 17 races. With the carryover seats the Democrats retained control of the State Senate 23 to 11.

==== State House of Delegates ====
All 100 members of the West Virginia House of Delegates were up for election. The state House previously consisted of 65 Democrats and 35 Republicans. This likewise was the first election following the redistricting, with the House districts changed more than those of the Senate. Democrats won only 55 of the 100 races, making the new balance of power 55–45, the best showing for Republicans since the party shift of 1932.

== Judiciary ==
=== Supreme Court of Appeals ===
Two seats were up for election on the state Supreme Court of Appeals. The electoral system requires voters to "vote for no more than two" in a single election, rather than electing each seat separately. Both seats were held by Democrats.

Justice Robin Jean Davis, who was first elected in 2000, ran for re-election, while Justice Thomas McHugh, kept his pledge to not seek a full term. McHugh had previously served on the court from 1980 to 1997, and was appointed and then elected to an unexpired term in 2008.

Davis faced Wood County Circuit Judge J.D. Beane; Letitia Neese Chafin, a lawyer and wife of state Senator H. Truman Chafin; Louis Palmer, a Supreme Court clerk; H. John "Buck" Rogers, a lawyer; and, Greenbrier County Circuit Judge Jim Rowe, in the Democratic primary. Chafin and Davis received the Democratic nomination.

Allen Loughry, a law clerk for Democrat Supreme Court Justice Margaret Workman, and Jefferson County Circuit Judge John Yoder sought and received the Republican nomination as they were the only two Republican candidates in the primary.

Davis was re-elected, while Allen Loughry was elected to his first term in office. With the election of Loughry, the court has two elected Republicans sitting on the bench for the first time since 1940.

May 8, 2012 Democratic primary
Party	Candidate	Votes	%
Democratic	Robin Davis (incumbent)	83,071	27.90%
Democratic	Letitia Chafin	80,393	27.00%
Democratic	Jim Rowe	59,185	19.88%
Democratic	J.D. Beane	30,543	10.26%
Democratic	H. John "Buck" Rogers	27,374	9.20%
Democratic	Louis Palmer	17,149	5.76%
Total votes		297,715	100.00%

May 8, 2012 Republican primary
Party	Candidate	Votes	%
Republican	John C. Yoder	62,796	54.48%
Republican	Allen Loughry	52,472	45.52%
Total votes		115,268	100.00%

November 6, 2012 general election
Party	Candidate	Votes	%
Democratic	Robin Davis (incumbent)	294,882	27.16%
Republican	Allen Loughry	284,299	26.19%
Republican	John C. Yoder	258,213	23.78%
Democratic	Letitia Chafin	248,284	22.87%
Total votes		1,085,678	100.00%
Democratic hold			
Republican gain from Democratic			
