= Charles H. Clements =

American politician

Member of the West Virginia Senate from the 2nd district
- Incumbent
- Assumed office January 28, 2017 Serving with Chris Rose
- Preceded by: Kent Leonhardt

Member of the West Virginia House of Delegates from the 5th district
- In office 1995–1998
- Preceded by: Dave Pethtel
- Succeeded by: Dave Pethtel

Personal details
- Born: August 21, 1943 (age 83) Huntington, West Virginia, U.S.
- Party: Republican
- Education: West Virginia University (B.A.)
- Profession: Businessman
- Website: Campaign website

Military service
- Branch: United States Army
- Service years: 1966–1968

Charles H. Clements (born August 21, 1943) is a Republican member of the West Virginia Senate, representing the 2nd district since January 28, 2017. Prior to this, Clements represented the 5th District in the West Virginia House of Delegates from 1995 to 1998.

== Election results ==
West Virginia Senate District 2 (Position A) election, 2022
Party	Candidate	Votes	%
Republican	Charles H. Clements (incumbent)	18,720	62.54%
Democratic	Eric Hayhurst	11,213	37.46%
Total votes		33,839	100.0%

West Virginia Senate District 2 (Position A) election, 2018
Party	Candidate	Votes	%
Republican	Charles H. Clements (incumbent)	19,895	58.79%
Democratic	Denny Longwell	13,944	41.21%
Total votes		33,839	100.0%
