= Dave Pethtel =

American politician

Member of the West Virginia House of Delegates from the 5th district
- In office December 1, 1998 – December 1, 2022
- Preceded by: Charles H. Clements
- Succeeded by: New boundaries
- In office December 1, 1988 – December 1, 1994
- Preceded by: Robert Jones
- Succeeded by: Charles H. Clements

Personal details
- Born: January 28, 1951 (age 75) Wheeling, West Virginia, U.S.
- Party: Democratic
- Education: Glenville State College; West Virginia University

David Lee Pethtel (born January 28, 1951) is an American politician who served as a member of the West Virginia House of Delegates representing District 5 from 1998 to 2022. Pethtel served non-consecutively from January 1989 until January 1995.

== Education ==
Pethtel earned his AB from Glenville State College and his MA from West Virginia University.

== Elections ==
- 2012 Pethtel was unopposed for the May 8, 2012, Democratic Primary, winning with 2,856 votes, and returning 2002 and 2008 opponent Denzil Sloan ran as the Constitution Party candidate, setting up a rematch; Pethtel won the three-way November 6, 2012, General election with 4,596 votes (80.7%) against Mountain Party candidate Raymond Davis and Sloan.
- 1980s and early 1990s Pethtel was initially elected in the 1988 Democratic Primary and the November 8, 1988, General election and was re-elected in the general elections of November 6, 1990, and November 3, 1992.
- 1998 When the District 5 seat was left open, Pethtel won the 1998 Democratic Primary and won the November 3, 1998, General election against Republican nominee Ed Amos.
- 2000 Pethtel was unopposed for the 2000 Democratic Primary and won the November 7, 2000, General election against Republican nominee Charles Clements.
- 2002 Pethtel was unopposed for the 2002 Democratic Primary and won the November 5, 2002, General election against Constitution Party candidate Denzil Sloan.
- 2004 Pethtel and returning 1998 Republican opponent Ed Amos both won their 2004 primaries, setting up a rematch; Pethtel won the November 2, 2004, General election against Amos.
- 2006 Pethtel was unopposed for both the 2006 Democratic Primary and the November 7, 2006, General election.
- 2008 Pethtel was unopposed for the May 13, 2008, Democratic Primary, winning with 3,672 votes, returning 2002 challenger Denzil Sloan ran as the Constitution candidate, setting up a rematch; Pethtel won the November 4, 2008, General election with 5,025 votes (84.5%) against Sloan.
- 2010 Pethtel was challenged in the May 11, 2010, Democratic Primary, winning with 2,029 votes (70.1%), and was unopposed for the November 2, 2010, General election, winning with 3,835 votes.
