= Melvin C. Snyder =

American politician

Member of the U.S. House of Representatives from West Virginia's 2nd district
- In office January 3, 1947 – January 3, 1949
- Preceded by: Jennings Randolph
- Succeeded by: Harley Orrin Staggers

Personal details
- Born: October 29, 1898 Albright, West Virginia, U.S.
- Died: August 5, 1972 (aged 73) Kingwood, West Virginia, U.S
- Party: Republican

Military service
- Allegiance: United States of America
- Branch/service: United States Army
- Rank: Colonel

Melvin Claude Snyder (October 29, 1898 – August 5, 1972) was an American attorney and Republican politician who served as a United States representative from West Virginia. He was a member of the Eightieth Congress.

Born in Albright, Preston County, West Virginia, Snyder attended the public schools. During the First World War, he enlisted in the United States Army and served as a private in 1918. In 1923 he graduated from the West Virginia University Law School at Morgantown, West Virginia and was admitted to the bar the same year. He began his legal practice in Kingwood, West Virginia. He became the mayor of Kingwood in 1926. He served as prosecuting attorney for Preston County from 1929 to 1944.

He returned to the United States Army and served from January 6, 1941, until his discharge as a colonel on January 30, 1946. He then served as the director of Surplus Property for Division of Territories and Island Possessions, Department of Interior.

Snyder had run for the U.S. House in 1938, losing to incumbent Democrat Jennings Randolph. In 1946 he tried again and defeated Randolph by two points. Unsurprisingly, a new Democrat ousted Snyder in 1948 and confirmed the defeat in 1950. Snyder had spent most of his war service in Alaska, and in his one House term showed much concern for the territory.

After leaving the House, he served as a judge, eighteenth judicial circuit court, West Virginia from January 1, 1953, to October 1, 1971. He was a member of the West Virginia Judicial Council and was a president of the West Virginia Judicial Association. He died in Kingwood on August 5, 1972, and was buried in Maplewood Cemetery.

== See also ==
- West Virginia's congressional delegations

== Sources ==
- United States Congress. "Melvin C. Snyder (id: S000670)". Biographical Directory of the United States Congress.

U.S. House of Representatives
Preceded by Jennings Randolph	Member of the U.S. House of Representatives from West Virginia's 2nd congressional district 1947–1949	Succeeded by Harley O. Staggers
