= Chris Rose (politician) =

American politician

Member of the West Virginia Senate from the 2nd district
- Incumbent
- Assumed office December 1, 2024 Serving with Charles H. Clements
- Preceded by: Mike Maroney

Personal details
- Born: 1990 (age 35–36)
- Party: Republican
- Education: Bluefield State College

Christopher Andrew Rose (born August 1990) is an American politician serving as a Republican member of the West Virginia Senate for the 2nd district. He is the chair of the Senate Energy, Industry and Mining Committee. He currently works as a controls technician for an electrical utility company. He formerly worked as a fourth generation coal miner for 14 years. Rose is from McDowell County. He graduated from Bluefield State College with a bachelor’s degree in mechanical engineering technology.

== West Virginia enlargement ==
Following the Democratic Party's victories in the 2025 United States elections, particularly in neighboring Virginia, Rose introduced legislation which invited 3 counties in Maryland and 27 in Virginia to join West Virginia. This resolution followed Abigail Spanberger's Democratic flip of the Virginia governorship, and Maryland Governor Wes Moore's decision to form a redistricting advisory commission. Rose later expanded his invitation to six more counties on November 18 in what he termed an "appeal to heaven".
