= Cleve Benedict =

American politician

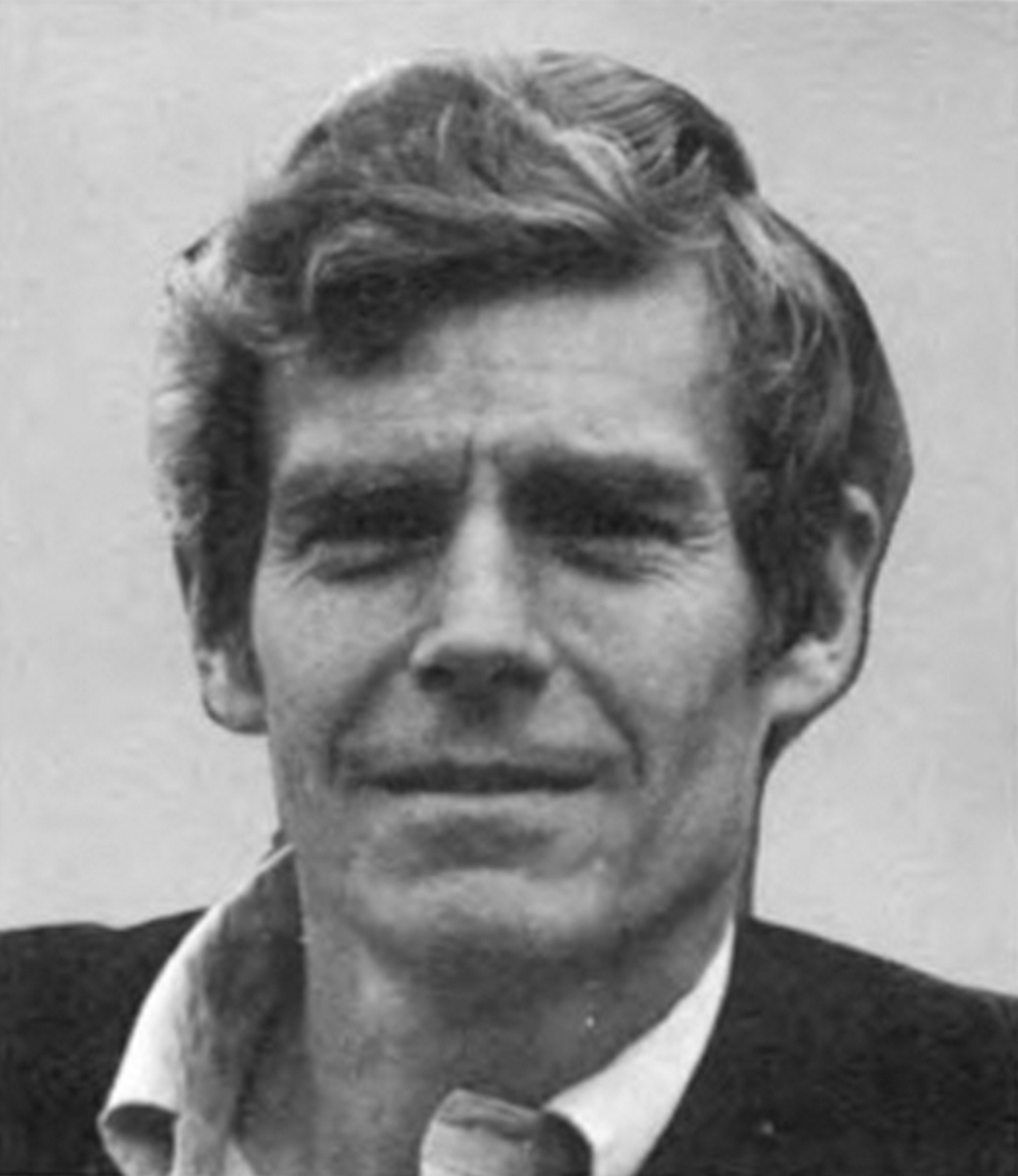

8th West Virginia Commissioner of Agriculture
- In office January 16, 1989 – January 18, 1993
- Governor: Gaston Caperton
- Preceded by: Gus Douglass
- Succeeded by: Gus Douglass

Member of the U.S. House of Representatives from West Virginia's 2nd district
- In office January 3, 1981 – January 3, 1983
- Preceded by: Harley Orrin Staggers
- Succeeded by: Harley O. Staggers Jr.

Personal details
- Born: Cleveland Keith Benedict; March 21, 1935 (age 91) Harrisburg, Pennsylvania, U.S.
- Party: Republican
- Spouse: Ann Farrar Arthur (m. 1957; died 2021)
- Children: 3, including Pinckney
- Education: Princeton University (BA)

Cleveland Keith Benedict (born March 21, 1935) is an American politician. A member of the Republican Party, he served one term in the United States House of Representatives for West Virginia's 2nd congressional district from 1981 to 1983.

== Life and career ==
Benedict was born in 1935 in Harrisburg, Pennsylvania. He graduated from The Hill School in 1953 and then studied at Princeton University, graduating with an A.B. in history in 1957. As part of his undergraduate degree, Benedict wrote a senior thesis titled "The Rise of the Natural Sciences and their Impact upon Oxford and Cambridge." He later attended a school for cattlemen in Kansas and settled near Lewisburg, West Virginia.

Benedict held several appointed positions in the Republican state administration of Arch Moore from 1969 to 1977. In 1970, he was an unsuccessful candidate for the state Senate's 11th District.

Benedict was the Republican nominee for the United States House of Representatives in the 2nd congressional district in 1980. The incumbent, Harley O. Staggers, had retired and the Democratic Party had gone through a bruising 10-way primary election. The Democrats also faced the burden of the unpopular federal administration of Jimmy Carter and state administration of Jay Rockefeller, both of whom carried the state, but lost the 2nd District by large margins.

Benedict won the general election and was subsequently appointed to the Committee on Energy and Commerce.

In 1982, Benedict decided, at the urging of Howard Baker, to forgo re-election and challenge incumbent senator Robert C. Byrd in the statewide race for the United States Senate. He was unsuccessful, although his campaign made great note of Byrd's record of high office in the Ku Klux Klan, his avoidance of service in World War II, and the fact that Byrd, then alone among members of Congress, owned no home in the state he represented. His campaign represented the last serious and well-funded effort to unseat Byrd, spending $1,098,218.

Benedict was then appointed as a deputy assistant secretary in the Department of Energy. In 1988, he ran for statewide election as commissioner of the West Virginia Department of Agriculture, winning by a large margin. He chose not to seek re-election in 1992, choosing instead to run for Governor of West Virginia. That November, he was defeated by a large margin in a three-way race. He finished behind incumbent governor Gaston Caperton.

Benedict has since retired to his dairy farm and has eschewed overtures to again seek elective office. He was a delegate to the 1996 Republican National Convention; however, he supported Democratic gubernatorial nominee Charlotte Pritt, who had run against Benedict and Caperton in the 1992 governor's race. Again in 2000, Benedict was elected as a delegate-at-large to the Republican National Convention committed to George W. Bush. He received the second largest number of votes. In 2006, he opposed a 124-turbine, $300 million Beech Ridge Energy wind farm to be built in Greenbrier County.

== Family ==
He is the son of Cooper Procter Benedict (1907–1968) and Laura DeLamater Benedict Beury (1911-d.). His parents married on April 14, 1934. He had a younger brother, Oakley DeLamater Benedict (1938–1940), who died young and was named after their maternal grandfather; and a younger sister, Elizabeth Hasbrouck Benedict Rice (b. 1941), named after their maternal grandmother. Cleve was named after their paternal grandfather, Rev. Cleveland Keith Benedict (1864–1936).

On his father's side of the family, he descends from Procter & Gamble co-founder William Procter and from Aaron Cleveland IV, the great-grandfather of 22nd and 24th president of the United States Grover Cleveland. On his mother's side of the family, he descends from the Hasbrouck family, industrialist Cornelius H. DeLamater, and Louis DuBois, a patentee (founder) of New Paltz, New York.

On August 10, 1957, in Winchester, Virginia, he married Ann Farrar Arthur (1933–2021), a native of Winchester. Together, they had three children: Cooper Procter Benedict II, Ruth Farrar (Benedict) Mercer, and noted author and college professor Pinckney Arthur Benedict. Pinckney named his son Cleveland Keith Benedict III after his father and great-grandfather.

== See also ==
- List of United States representatives from West Virginia

U.S. House of Representatives
| Preceded by Harley Staggers | Member of the U.S. House of Representatives from West Virginia's 2nd congressional district 1981–1983 | Succeeded by Buckey Staggers |
Party political offices
| Vacant Title last held by Elmer Dodson; 1970 | Republican nominee for U.S. Senator from West Virginia (Class 1); 1982 | Succeeded by Jay Wolfe |
| Preceded by Glenn Smith | Republican nominee for Agriculture Commissioner of West Virginia; 1988 | Succeeded by Steven Teufel |
| Preceded by Arch Moore | Republican nominee for Governor of West Virginia; 1992 | Succeeded by Cecil Underwood |
Political offices
| Preceded by Gus Douglass | Agriculture Commissioner of West Virginia; 1989–1993 | Succeeded by Gus Douglass |
U.S. order of precedence (ceremonial)
| Preceded by Steve Watkins as Former U.S. Representative | Order of precedence of the United States as Former U.S. Representative | Succeeded by Evan Jenkins as Former U.S. Representative |
