= 1982 United States Senate election in West Virginia =

- November 2, 1982
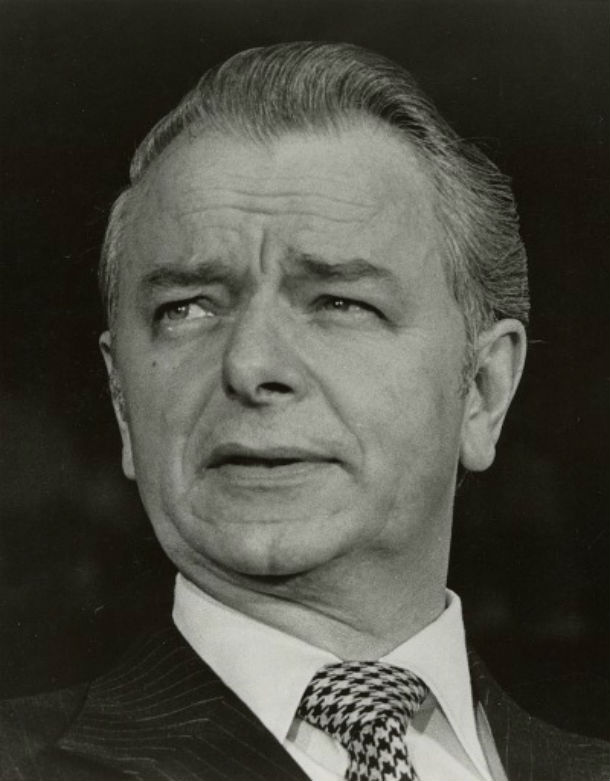

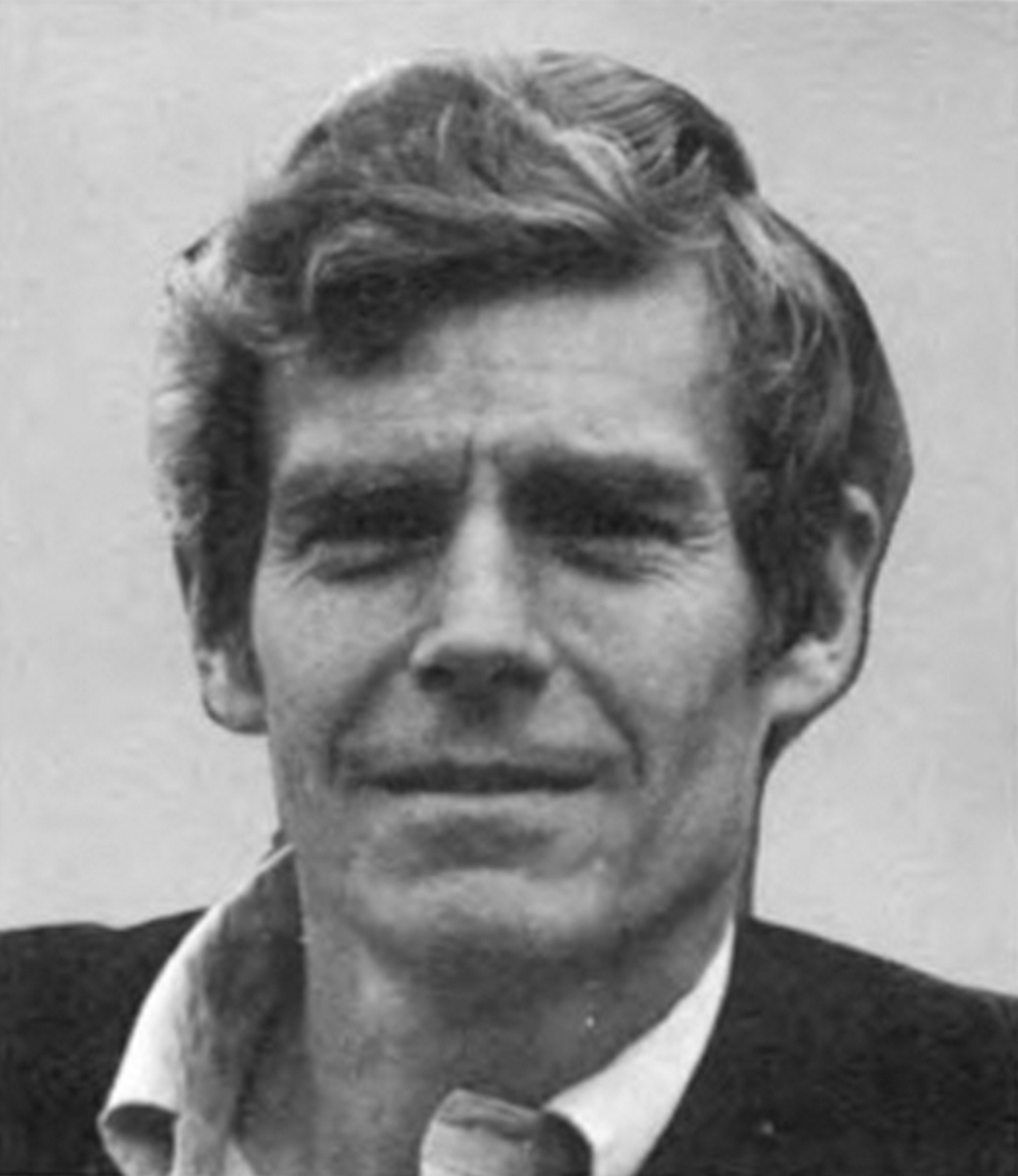
Nominee	Robert Byrd	Cleve Benedict
Party	Democratic	Republican
Popular vote	387,170	173,910
Percentage	68.49%	30.76%
- County results Byrd: 40–50% 50–60% 60–70% 70–80% 80–90% Benedict: 50–60%
U.S. senator before election
Robert Byrd
Democratic
Elected U.S. Senator
Robert Byrd
Democratic

The 1982 United States Senate election in West Virginia took place on November 2, 1982. Incumbent Democratic U.S. Senator Robert Byrd won re-election to a fifth term.

== Candidates ==
=== Democratic ===
- Robert Byrd, incumbent U.S. Senator

=== Republican ===
- Cleve Benedict, U.S. Congressman first elected in 1980

== Campaign ==
Benedict, a freshman congressman, made great note of Byrd's record of high office in the Ku Klux Klan, his avoidance of service in World War II, and the fact that Byrd, then alone among members of Congress, owned no home in the state he represented. His campaign represented the last serious and well-funded effort to unseat Byrd, spending $1,098,218. Byrd was Minority Leader at the time.

== Results ==
General election results
Party	Candidate	Votes	%
Democratic	Robert Byrd (incumbent)	387,170	68.49%
Republican	Cleve Benedict	173,910	30.76%
Socialist Workers	William B. Howland	4,234	0.75%
Total votes		565,314	100.00%
Democratic hold			

== See also ==
- 1982 United States Senate elections
