= West Virginia's 2nd Senate district =

American legislative district

West Virginia's 2nd State Senate district
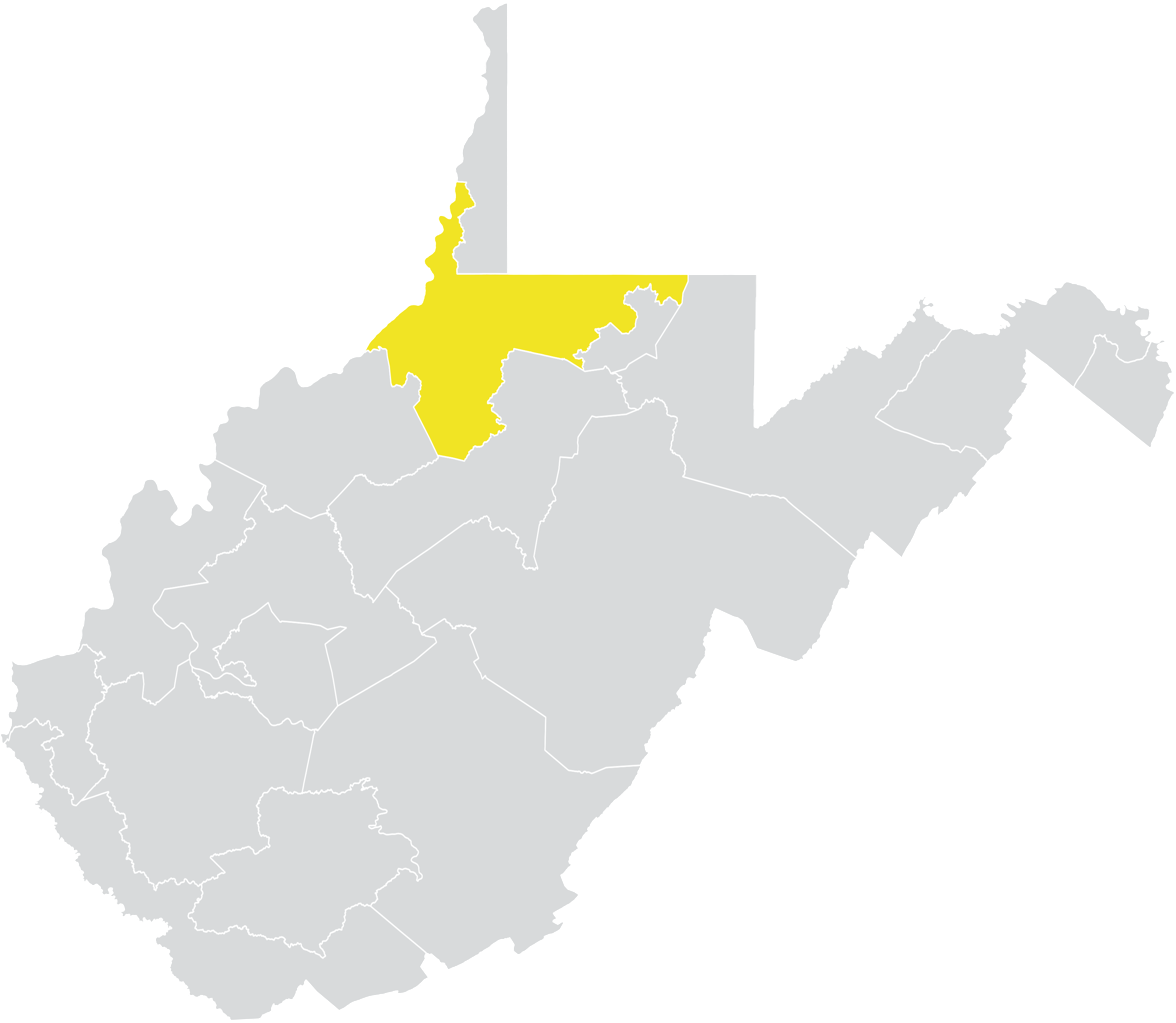
Senator
Charles H. Clements; R–New Martinsville
Chris Rose; R–Granville
- Demographics: 92% White; 2% Black; 1% Hispanic; 0% Asian; 2% Native American; 1% Other
- Population (2021): 104,256

West Virginia's 2nd Senate district is one of 17 districts in the West Virginia Senate. It is currently represented by Republicans Charles H. Clements and Chris Rose. All districts in the West Virginia Senate elect two members to staggered four-year terms.

== Geography ==
District 2 is based in the Mid-Ohio Valley region, covering all of Calhoun, Doddridge, Ritchie, Tyler, and Wetzel Counties and parts of Gilmer, Marion, Marshall, and Monongalia Counties. It includes the communities of Moundsville, McMechen, New Martinsville, Paden City, Mannington, Pennsboro, Sistersville, and Grantsville.

The district is located largely within West Virginia's 1st congressional district, with a small portion extending into West Virginia's 2nd congressional district, and overlaps with the 4th, 5th, 6th, 7th, 33rd, 34th, 50th, and 51st districts of the West Virginia House of Delegates. It borders the states of Ohio and Pennsylvania.

== Recent election results ==
=== 2024 ===
2024 West Virginia Senate election, District 2
Primary election
Party	Candidate	Votes	%
Republican	Chris Rose	7,653	61.3
Republican	Mike Maroney (incumbent)	4,824	38.7
Total votes		12,477	100.0
General election
Republican	Chris Rose	37,022	100.0
Total votes		37,022	100.0
Republican hold			

=== 2022 ===
2022 West Virginia Senate election, District 2
Party	Candidate	Votes	%
Republican	Charles Clements (incumbent)	18,720	62.5
Democratic	Eric Hayhurst	11,213	37.5
Total votes		29,933	100.0
Republican hold			

== Historical election results ==
=== 2020 ===
2020 West Virginia Senate election, District 2
Primary election
Party	Candidate	Votes	%
Republican	Mike Maroney (incumbent)	7,964	61.4
Republican	Elijah Dean	5,016	38.6
Total votes		12,980	100
Democratic	Josh Gary	5,770	51.3
Democratic	Carla Jones	5,478	48.7
Total votes		11,248	100
General election
Republican	Mike Maroney (incumbent)	25,136	56.2
Democratic	Josh Gary	19,569	43.8
Total votes		44,705	100
Republican hold			

=== 2018 ===
2018 West Virginia Senate election, District 2
Primary election
Party	Candidate	Votes	%
Democratic	Denny Longwell	5,388	58.9
Democratic	Carla Jones	3,753	41.1
Total votes		9,141	100
General election
Republican	Charles Clements (incumbent)	19,895	58.8
Democratic	Denny Longwell	13,944	41.2
Total votes		33,839	100
Republican hold			

=== 2016 ===
2016 West Virginia Senate election, District 2
Primary election
Party	Candidate	Votes	%
Republican	Mike Maroney	6,585	54.3
Republican	Ginger Nalley	5,541	45.7
Total votes		12,126	100
General election
Republican	Mike Maroney	22,902	54.3
Democratic	Lisa Zukoff	15,754	37.4
Libertarian	H. John Rogers	3,521	8.3
Total votes		42,177	100
Republican gain from Democratic			

=== 2014 ===
2014 West Virginia Senate election, District 2
Party	Candidate	Votes	%
Republican	Kent Leonhardt	13,034	50.0
Democratic	Larry J. Edgell (incumbent)	12,358	47.4
Libertarian	Jeffrey Jarrell	681	2.6
Total votes		26,073	100
Republican gain from Democratic			

=== 2012 ===
2012 West Virginia Senate election, District 2
Party	Candidate	Votes	%
Democratic	Jeff Kessler (incumbent)	29,474	100
Total votes		29,474	100
Democratic hold			

=== Federal and statewide results ===
Year	Office	Results
2020	President	Trump 69.1 – 29.0%
2020	Senate	Capito 70.9 – 25.8%
2020	Governor	Justice 64.4 – 30.6%
2018	Senate	Manchin 50.5 – 44.0%
2016	President	Trump 69.3 – 24.9%
2016	Governor	Justice 46.8 – 44.2%
