= Harley Orrin Staggers =

American politician (1907–1991)

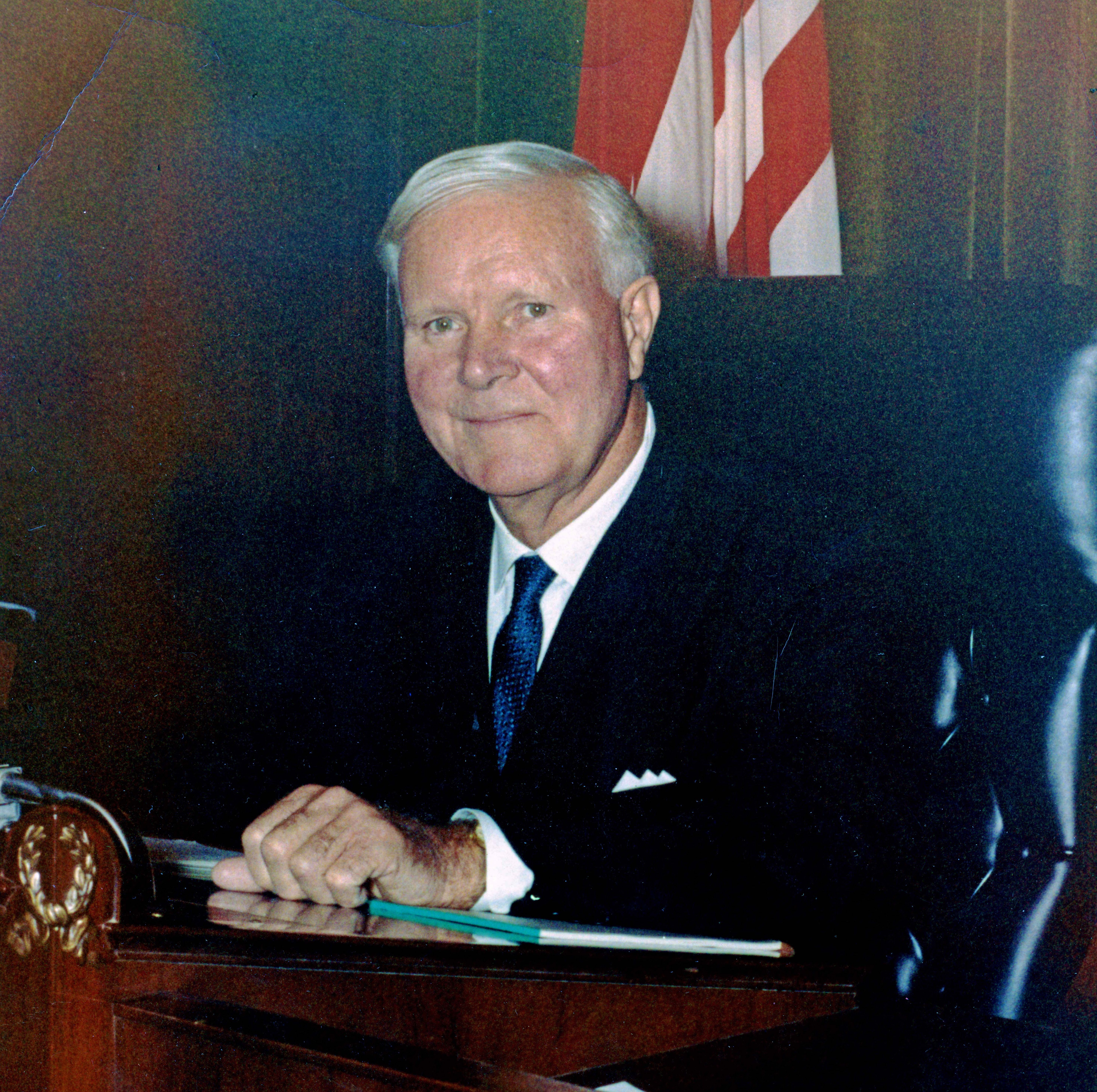
- Staggers in 1966

Member of the U.S. House of Representatives from West Virginia's 2nd district
- In office January 3, 1949 – January 3, 1981
- Preceded by: Melvin C. Snyder
- Succeeded by: Cleve Benedict

Personal details
- Born: Harley Orrin Staggers; August 3, 1907 Keyser, West Virginia, U.S.
- Died: August 20, 1991 (aged 84) Cumberland, Maryland, U.S.
- Party: Democratic
- Spouse: Mary Casey Staggers
- Children: 5, including Margaret and Harley Jr.
- Education: Emory and Henry College (BA); Duke University

Military service
- Branch/service: United States Navy
- Years of service: 1942–1946
- Battles/wars: World War II

Harley Orrin Staggers Sr. (August 3, 1907 – August 20, 1991) was a liberal American politician who served 16 terms in the United States House of Representatives from 1949 to 1981, representing West Virginia's 2nd congressional district as a Democrat. From 1966 until his retirement in 1981, Congressman Staggers chaired the powerful House Committee on Interstate and Foreign Commerce (today the Committee on Energy and Commerce). A longtime supporter of the American railroad industry and its workers, Congressman Staggers' landmark legislative achievement was the Staggers Rail Act, passed in 1980.

== Early life ==
Staggers was born on August 3, 1907, in Keyser, Mineral County, West Virginia; he graduated from Emory and Henry College with a BA in 1931 and did graduate work at Duke University.

Staggers taught science and coached for a Virginia high school and later coached football at Potomac State College. He served as sheriff of Mineral County from 1937 to 1941. He enlisted in the Navy on October 7, 1942, and served as a navigator in the U.S. Naval Air Corps during World War II. He was discharged on January 22, 1946.

== Career ==
In 1948, Staggers was elected to the U.S. House of Representatives, representing West Virginia's 2nd Congressional District. He was reelected to another 15 terms in Congress, serving until his retirement in 1981. For 16 years, from 1966 until his retirement, Staggers chaired the powerful House Committee on Foreign and Interstate Commerce (Energy and Commerce), the longest uninterrupted tenure of any chairman of that committee in its over 200-year history (Staggers' successor, John Dingell, served for 14 years from 1981 until 1995 and again from 2007 until 2009). He was a delegate to the Democratic National Convention from West Virginia in 1960. Staggers did not sign the 1956 Southern Manifesto, and voted in favor of the Civil Rights Acts of 1957, 1960, 1964, and 1968, as well as the 24th Amendment to the U.S. Constitution and the Voting Rights Act of 1965. During his time as a congressman, Staggers had a mainly liberal voting record.

== First Amendment ==
On June 10, 1971, the U.S. Supreme Court ruled that the Nixon Administration could not block The New York Times from publishing the Pentagon Papers. The next month, on July 12, 1971, Staggers ordered CBS News to hand over film not used in the documentary Selling of the Pentagon.

According to Staggers this was the only way to know if the documentary had been accurately edited. The president of CBS News, Frank Stanton, said he would go to jail before complying with Staggers' subpoenas. The House supported Stanton and Staggers was forced to abandon his ultimatum.

In 1973, Staggers heard on the radio the John Lennon song "Working Class Hero" — which includes the lines "'Til you're so fucking crazy you can't follow their rules" and "But you're still fucking peasants as far as I can see" — on WGTB and lodged a complaint with the Federal Communications Commission (FCC). The manager of the station, Ken Sleeman, faced a year in prison and a $10,000 fine, but defended his decision to play the song saying, "The People of Washington, DC are sophisticated enough to accept the occasional four-letter word in context, and not become sexually aroused, offended, or upset." The charges were dropped.

== Illegal drugs in sports ==
On May 11, 1973, the House Committee on Interstate and Foreign Commerce which was chaired by Staggers issued a press release summarizing the results of an investigation that determined illegal drug use existed in all level of sports. The investigation also described the degree of use, including steroids and amphetamines, as alarming.

== Personal life ==
Staggeres married Mary Casey Staggers, with whom they had the following children:

- His daughter Mary Kaye Staggers was a professor at Potomac State College and is a member of the West Virginia Democratic Executive Committee.
- His sons, Harley O. Staggers Jr. and Daniel C. Staggers, practice law in Keyser, West Virginia. Harley Jr. was also a member of the United States House of Representatives, representing West Virginia's 2nd congressional district from 1983 to 1993.
- His daughter Margaret Anne "Peggy" Staggers, a resident of Fayetteville, West Virginia, was twice a member of the West Virginia House of Delegates, from 2006–2014 and 2018–2020.
- His daughter Susan owned and managed two successful local businesses in Keyser until her and her husband's retirement. His daughter Ellen resides in Morgantown.

== Death and legacy ==
He died on August 20, 1991 in Cumberland, Maryland.

In 1980, Congress passed legislation crafted by Congressman Staggers and other members of the Interstate and Foreign Commerce Committee to carry out the deregulation of America's railroad industry. The Staggers Rail Act was signed into law by President Jimmy Carter on October 14, 1980, and named in honor of Congressman Staggers in recognition of his many years of work on the part of railroad companies and their workers. By eliminating archaic regulations over the railroad industry, the bill allowed rail companies to enter into contracts with shippers and set their own prices without Interstate Commerce Commission approval. The Staggers Rail Act is viewed as having a significant role in strengthening the American railroad industry as well as improving safety.

A Federal Court and Post Office building in Morgantown, West Virginia as well as a portion of Water Street in his hometown of Keyser, West Virginia, are named in honor of Congressman Staggers.

== See also ==
- List of United States representatives from West Virginia
- Staggers Rail Act

U.S. House of Representatives
Preceded by Melvin C. Snyder	Member of the U.S. House of Representatives from West Virginia's 2nd congressional district January 3, 1949 – January 3, 1981	Succeeded by Cleve Benedict
Political offices
Preceded by Oren Harris; Arkansas	Chairman of the House Interstate and Foreign Commerce Committee; 1966–1981	Succeeded by John Dingell; Michigan
