= Mike Maroney =

American politician (born 1968)

Member of the West Virginia Senate from the 2nd district
- In office December 1, 2016 – December 1, 2024
- Preceded by: Jeff Kessler
- Succeeded by: Chris Rose

Personal details
- Born: March 8, 1968 (age 58) Wheeling, West Virginia, U.S.
- Party: Republican
- Education: West Virginia University (B.A.); Marshall University School of Medicine (M.D.)
- Profession: Physician

Michael J. Maroney is a former Republican member of the West Virginia Senate, who represented the 2nd district from 2016 to 2024 when he was arrested and charged with driving under the influence and indecent exposure. Subsequently, the Monongalia County Republican Executive Committee called on Maroney to resign from office.

Maroney served as the Senate Chair for the Health and Human Resources Committee and served as Vice Chair of the Military Committee. He also served as a member on additional Senate committees including Finance, Government Organization, Rules, and Workforce.

== Election results ==
2024: Maroney ran for re-election in 2024 but was defeated in the Republican primary by Chris Rose.

2020: After some public ambivalence due to pending criminal litigation, Maroney ran in the June 2020 Republican primary, where he faced challenger Elijah Dean. Maroney beat Dean 61-39%. Maroney then faced Josh Gary, a John Marshall High School teacher, in the November general election. Gary criticized Maroney for his pending legal troubles throughout the race, calling for more details to be released about the criminal charges and civil litigation Maroney is facing. Maroney beat Gary by a 56-44% margin to win a second term.

West Virginia Senate District 2 (Position B) election, 2020
Party	Candidate	Votes	%
Republican	Mike Maroney (incumbent)	25,136	56.23%
Democratic	Josh Gary	19,569	43.77%
Total votes		44,705	100.0%

2020 West Virginia Senate election, District 2 Republican Primary
Primary election
Party	Candidate	Votes	%
Republican	Mike Maroney (incumbent)	7,964	61.36%
Republican	Elijah Dean	5,016	38.64%
Total votes		12,980	100.0%

2016: After State Senate Minority Leader Jeff Kessler announced his candidacy for Governor in the 2016 Governor Election, he left a vacancy in Senate District 2, where he served for 20 years. Maroney, a radiologist, faced Ginger Nalley, a small business owner, in the Republican primary. Maroney beat Nalley 54-46% to advance to the November general election. Maroney faced Democratic nominee Lisa Zukoff, a small business owner, and Libertarian H. John Rogers in the general election. Maroney won the race with 54% of the vote.

West Virginia Senate District 2 (Position B) election, 2016
Party	Candidate	Votes	%
Republican	Mike Maroney	22,902	54.30%
Democratic	Lisa Zukoff	15,754	37.35%
Libertarian	H. John Rogers	3,521	8.35%
Total votes		42,177	100.0%

2016 West Virginia Senate election, District 2 Republican Primary
Primary election
Party	Candidate	Votes	%
Republican	Mike Maroney	6,585	54.30%
Republican	Ginger Nalley	5,541	45.70%
Total votes		12,126	100.0%

== Legal issues ==
On August 28, 2019, Maroney was arrested for soliciting a prostitute. He pleaded not guilty. His case was continued four times, most recently in October 2020 after the circuit court considered a request for a special prosecutor due to an alleged conflict of interest by Marshall County Prosecuting Attorney Rhonda Wade. The charges were dismissed in March 2021. He also briefly faced several misdemeanor charges related to the use of 'Doctor' on campaign signs, although those charges were quickly dismissed.

On August 13, 2024, Maroney was arrested in Glen Dale, West Virginia. According to court documents, he was charged with indecent exposure and disorderly conduct after he was observed on video surveillance masturbating inside a gaming room at Gumby's Cigarette & Beer World, on August 4.

On September 23, 2024, Maroney was arrested and charged with driving under the influence. Subsequently, the Monongalia County Republican Executive Committee called on Maroney to resign from office.
