= Gus Douglass =

American politician (1927–2015)

Gus R. Douglass
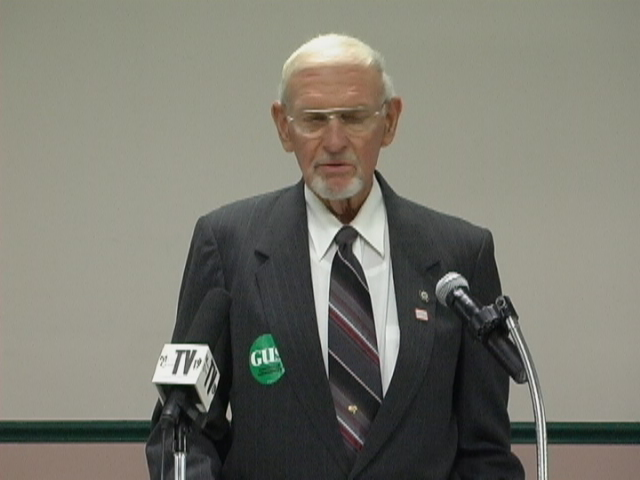
- Douglass in September 2008

7th and 9th West Virginia Commissioner of Agriculture
- In office 1993–2013
- Governor: Gaston Caperton; Cecil H. Underwood; Bob Wise; Joe Manchin; Earl Ray Tomblin
- Preceded by: Cleve Benedict
- Succeeded by: Walt Helmick
- In office 1965–1989
- Governor: Hulett C. Smith; Arch A. Moore, Jr. Jay Rockefeller
- Preceded by: John T. Johnson
- Succeeded by: Cleve Benedict

Personal details
- Born: February 22, 1927 Mason County, West Virginia, U.S.
- Died: March 19, 2015 (aged 88) Mason County, West Virginia, U.S.
- Party: Democratic
- Spouse: Anna Lee Douglass
- Education: West Virginia University

Gus R. Douglass (February 22, 1927 – March 19, 2015) was an American politician and member of the Democratic Party, who served as Agriculture Commissioner of West Virginia for 44 years. First elected to that post in 1964, he served from 1965 to 1989, when he left office having run unsuccessfully for the Democratic nomination for Governor, and again from 1993 to 2013. He was the longest-serving Agriculture Commissioner in US history, having served for 44 years and under 8 different Governors.

== Early life ==
Douglass was born in Mason County in 1927 and raised in Grimms Landing, West Virginia. He served as state and national president of the Future Farmers of America (FFA) as the first president of the FFA to hail from West Virginia, and later was the inaugural president of the National FFA Alumni Association. He is also a 4-H All-Star. Douglas holds a bachelor's degree and an honorary Doctor of Sciences from West Virginia University and an honorary Doctor of Laws from West Virginia State University. Prior to beginning work for the Department of Agriculture, Douglass operated a farm equipment and motor truck dealership.

== Career ==
Douglass, then a farmer in Mason County, was recruited to the position of Assistant Commissioner in the West Virginia Department of Agriculture by then-Commissioner John T. Johnson in 1957. He went on to serve as Commissioner in his own right for six terms between 1965 and 1989, and five more between 1993 and 2013. He unsuccessfully ran for Governor of West Virginia in 1988.

Douglass was re-elected in 2008 over Republican nominee J. Michael Teets, having campaigned on his record of having established programs for meat inspection, food safety and animal health, and calling for technology and security measures including a mobile laboratory able to identify viruses more quickly. In his last term, he successfully acquired funding from the West Virginia Legislature for a cold storage facility near Ripley which is used to store food for the state's schools and its donated foods program, and could also be used for disaster preparation.

During his tenure as Agriculture Commissioner, Douglass served as president of the National Association of State Departments of Agriculture, the Southern Association of State Departments of Agriculture and the Southern United States Trade Association; and chair of the Southern Regional Committee for Food and Agriculture and the United States Secretary of Agriculture's Advisory Committee on Foreign Animal and Poultry Diseases. He also testified before the United States Congress multiple times on matters relating to farming.

When he retired Douglass had worked at the West Virginia Department of Agriculture for more than half of its then 101-year history. Over the period the department's budget grew from less than $1 million to more than $55 million.

== Retirement ==
Douglass announced on May 17, 2011 that he would not seek re-election in 2012, after colleagues in the Department of Agriculture expressed an interest in the position of Commissioner. At the press conference at which he announced his retirement, he described his electoral history as "truly humbling." Douglass was succeeded in 2013 by Walt Helmick.

In 2014 an audit by the West Virginia Legislature found mismanagement, potential fraud and lack of oversight in a loan program operated by the Department of Agriculture during Douglass's tenure. The audit's findings included that Douglass had sought reimbursement of $106.72 per night for a campsite at the West Virginia State Fair when in reality the State Fair provided the campsite free of charge. The audit's findings were turned over to federal prosecutors who, as of March 2015, have taken no action; and the loan program was restructured under Helmick. Douglass said he was not contacted as part of the audit. A follow-up audit later in 2014 raised additional issues with the loan program and found evidence of inappropriate reimbursements and expense claims, including a $282 expense for two nights' lodging for Douglas in relation to a November 2013 retirement party.

== Personal life ==
Douglass ran a 540-acre farm which specialized in beef cattle and grain production with his son, Tom. He and his wife, Anna Lee, had four children, six grandchildren and nine great-grandchildren. Anna Lee died in October 2014.

== Death ==
Douglass died on March 19, 2015, following a fall at his home in Mason County. He was 88. His funeral was held on March 22, 2015. He is survived by his four children and a number of grandchildren and great-grandchildren.

== Electoral history ==
West Virginia Commissioner of Agriculture, Democratic primary, 1964
Gus R. Douglass – 72,016 (27.90%)
Charles E. Jenkins – 46,486 (18.01%)
Roscoe Beall – 38,087 (14.76%)
Carroll R. Hawkins – 34,415 (13.33%)
O. Roy Parker – 27,244 (10.56%)
V. L. Martin – 27,127 (10.51%)
J. P. (Joe) Muck – 12,715 (4.93%)

West Virginia Commissioner of Agriculture, general election, 1964
Gus R. Douglass, Democratic Party – 451,850 (62.01%)
Nicholas M. Homes, Republican Party – 276,834 (37.99%)

West Virginia Commissioner of Agriculture, Democratic primary, 1968
Gus R. Douglass – 128,774 (52.70%)
Charles E. Jenkins – 115,562 (47.30%)

West Virginia Commissioner of Agriculture, general election, 1968
Gus R. Douglass, Democratic Party – 367,949 (53.89%)
Edward T. White, Republican Party – 314,882 (46.11%)

West Virginia Commissioner of Agriculture, Democratic primary, 1972
Gus R. Douglass – 179,130 (64.06%)
Charles Jenkins – 100,480 (35.94%)

West Virginia Commissioner of Agriculture, general election, 1972
Gus R. Douglass, Democratic Party – 452,829 (100.00%)

West Virginia Commissioner of Agriculture, Democratic primary, 1976
Gus R. Douglass – 198,803 (63.70%)
Charles E. Jenkins – 113,295 (36.30%)

West Virginia Commissioner of Agriculture, general election, 1976
Gus R. Douglass, Democratic Party – 508,998 (100.00%)

West Virginia Commissioner of Agriculture, Democratic primary, 1980
Gus R. Douglass – 183,711 (68.21%)
Charles E. Jenkins – 85,626 (31.79%)

West Virginia Commissioner of Agriculture, general election, 1980
Gus R. Douglass, Democratic Party – 442,215 (67.37%)
Lionel L. Smith, Republican Party – 214,228 (32.63%)

West Virginia Commissioner of Agriculture, Democratic primary, 1984
Gus R. Douglass – 227,715 (69.84%)
Charles E. Jenkins – 98,326 (30.16%)

West Virginia Commissioner of Agriculture, general election, 1984
Gus R. Douglass, Democratic Party – 447,947 (67.46%)
Glenn M. Smith, Jr., Republican Party – 216,100 (32.54%)

Governor of West Virginia, Democratic primary, 1988
Gaston Caperton – 132,435 (37.96%)
Clyde See – 94,364 (27.05%)
Mario J. Palumbo – 51,722 (14.84%)
Gus R. Douglass – 48,748 (13.97%)
Dan Tonkovich – 14,916 (4.28%)
Larry Harless – 5,217 (1.50%)
Paul Nuchims – 1,484 (0.43%)

West Virginia Commissioner of Agriculture, Democratic primary, 1992
Gus R. Douglass – 195,494 (70.02%)
Frederick L. Parker – 50,443 (18.07%)
Jeffrey K. Silverman – 33,253 (11.91%)

West Virginia Commissioner of Agriculture, general election, 1992
Gus R. Douglass, Democratic Party – 413,869 (70.64%)
Steven C. Teufel, Republican Party – 172,060 (29.37%)

West Virginia Commissioner of Agriculture, Democratic primary, 1996
Gus R. Douglass – 252,246 (100.00%)

West Virginia Commissioner of Agriculture, general election, 1996
Gus R. Douglass, Democratic Party – 401,961 (72.08%)
Paul Nuchims, Republican Party – 155,673 (27.92%)

West Virginia Commissioner of Agriculture, Democratic primary, 2000
Gus R. Douglass – 224,800 (100.00%)

West Virginia Commissioner of Agriculture, general election, 2000
Gus R. Douglass, Democratic Party – 485,648 (100.00%)

West Virginia Commissioner of Agriculture, Democratic primary, 2004
Gus R. Douglass – 217,069 (100.00%)

West Virginia Commissioner of Agriculture, general election, 2004
Gus R. Douglass, Democratic Party – 437,881 (63.34%)
Andrew Yost, Republican Party – 253,402 (36.66%)

West Virginia Commissioner of Agriculture, Democratic primary, 2008
Gus R. Douglass – 193,766 (63.08%)
Oscar Wayne Casto – 113,400 (36.92%)

West Virginia Commissioner of Agriculture, general election, 2008
Gus R. Douglass, Democratic Party – 352,242 (53.07%)
James Michael Teets, Republican Party – 311,496 (46.93%)

Party political offices
Preceded by John T. Johnson	Democratic nominee for Agriculture Commissioner of West Virginia; 1964, 1968, 1972, 1976, 1980, 1984	Succeeded by Billy Brown Burke
Preceded by Billy Brown Burke	Democratic nominee for Agriculture Commissioner of West Virginia; 1992, 1996, 2000, 2004, 2008	Succeeded by Walt Helmick
