= Walt Helmick =

American businessman and politician (1944–2025)

West Virginia Commissioner of Agriculture
- In office January 14, 2013 – January 16, 2017
- Governor: Earl Ray Tomblin
- Preceded by: Gus Douglass
- Succeeded by: Kent Leonhardt

Member of the West Virginia Senate from the 15th district
- In office December 1, 1994 – January 14, 2013
- Preceded by: Mike Withers
- Succeeded by: Donald Cookman

Member of the West Virginia Senate from the 12th district
- In office December 1, 1990 – December 1, 1994
- Preceded by: Larry Tucker
- Succeeded by: Rebecca I. White

Personal details
- Born: April 25, 1944 Webster Springs, West Virginia, U.S.
- Died: September 6, 2025 (aged 81) Minnehaha Springs, West Virginia, U.S.
- Party: Democratic
- Spouse: Rita Fay
- Children: 4
- Education: West Virginia University, Montgomery

Walter D. Helmick (April 25, 1944 – September 6, 2025) was an American businessman and Democratic Party politician who served as the Commissioner of Agriculture of the state of West Virginia. He was elected to the position in 2012, defeating Republican nominee Kent Leonhardt. In 2016, Leonhardt defeated him in a rematch. Previously, he was a member of the West Virginia Senate, representing the 15th district from 1990 to 2012. Earlier he was a member of the West Virginia House of Delegates from 1988 through 1989, served on the Pocahontas County Commission and on the Pocahontas County School Board.

Walt Helmick died from cancer on September 6, 2025, at the age of 81.

== Electoral history ==
West Virginia House of Delegates 27th District Democratic Primary Election, 1988
| Party | Candidate | Votes | % |
| Democratic | Joe Martin | 3,667 | 23.63 |
| Democratic | Walt Helmick | 3,065 | 19.75 |
| Democratic | Bill Proudfoot | 2,508 | 16.16 |
| Democratic | "Stratt" Ogden Sr. | 2,044 | 13.17 |
| Democratic | Judith Seaman | 1,669 | 10.75 |
| Democratic | James "Ross" Ware | 1,160 | 7.47 |
| Democratic | Frank Rowe | 888 | 5.72 |
| Democratic | Katherine Wright Fagan | 519 | 3.34 |

West Virginia House of Delegates 27th District Election, 1988
| Party | Candidate | Votes | % |
| Democratic | Walt Helmick | 7,908 | 32.56 |
| Democratic | Joe Martin | 7,034 | 28.96 |
| Republican | Jimmie Ryder Sr. | 5,113 | 21.05 |
| Republican | Phillip Cupp | 4,232 | 17.42 |

West Virginia Senate 12th District Democratic Primary Election, 1990
| Party | Candidate | Votes | % |
| Democratic | Walt Helmick | 8,646 | 50.79 |
| Democratic | D. P. Given | 4,916 | 28.88 |
| Democratic | George "Geo." Kallai | 3,461 | 20.33 |

West Virginia Senate 12th District Election, 1990
| Party | Candidate | Votes | % |
| Democratic | Walt Helmick | 17,339 | 65.86 |
| Republican | Ashley Morrissette | 8,989 | 34.14 |

West Virginia Senate 15th District Election, 1994
| Party | Candidate | Votes | % |
| Democratic | Walt Helmick (inc.) | 16,420 | 60.40 |
| Republican | Aubry Wilson | 10,766 | 39.60 |

West Virginia Senate 15th District Democratic Primary Election, 1998
| Party | Candidate | Votes | % |
| Democratic | Walt Helmick (inc.) | 7,316 | 61.09 |
| Democratic | Leslee McCarty | 2,934 | 24.50 |
| Democratic | Tom Jones | 1,725 | 14.41 |

West Virginia Senate 15th District Election, 1998
| Party | Candidate | Votes | % |
| Democratic | Walt Helmick (inc.) | 14,879 | 60.69 |
| Republican | Les Shoemaker Jr. | 9,638 | 39.31 |

West Virginia Senate 15th District Election, 2002
| Party | Candidate | Votes | % |
| Democratic | Walt Helmick (inc.) | 14,630 | 55.70 |
| Republican | Chris Davis | 10,461 | 39.83 |
| Mountain | Kit Patten | 1,173 | 4.47 |

West Virginia Senate 15th District Election, 2006
| Party | Candidate | Votes | % |
| Democratic | Walt Helmick (inc.) | 21,509 | 99.57 |
| Write-in | Jeremy Donald Bauserman | 92 | 0.43 |

West Virginia Senate 15th District Democratic Primary Election, 2010
| Party | Candidate | Votes | % |
| Democratic | Walt Dolph Helmick (inc.) | 6,864 | 67.47 |
| Democratic | Thomas Paul Ditty | 3,310 | 32.53 |

West Virginia Senate 15th District Election, 2010
| Party | Candidate | Votes | % |
| Democratic | Walt Dolph Helmick (inc.) | 19,192 | 57.01 |
| Republican | Jeremy Donald Bauserman | 14,470 | 42.99 |

West Virginia Commissioner of Agriculture Democratic Primary Election, 2012
| Party | Candidate | Votes | % |
| Democratic | Walt Helmick | 59,376 | 32.89 |
| Democratic | Sally Shepherd | 44,454 | 24.62 |
| Democratic | Steve Miller | 39,130 | 21.67 |
| Democratic | Joe Messineo | 24,613 | 13.63 |
| Democratic | Bob Tabb | 12,976 | 7.19 |

West Virginia Commissioner of Agriculture Election, 2012
| Party | Candidate | Votes | % |
| Democratic | Walt Helmick | 316,591 | 51.59 |
| Republican | Kent Leonhardt | 297,088 | 48.41 |

West Virginia Commissioner of Agriculture Election, 2016
| Party | Candidate | Votes | % |
| Republican | Kent Leonhardt | 321,560 | 48.41 |
| Democratic | Walt Helmick | 274,191 | 41.28 |
| Libertarian | Buddy A. Guthrie | 68,502 | 10.31 |

Party political offices
| Preceded by Gus Douglass | Democratic nominee for Agriculture Commissioner of West Virginia; 2012, 2016 | Succeeded by Bob Beach |
