= West Virginia Department of Agriculture =

American Government agency

Agency overview
- Jurisdiction: State of West Virginia
- Headquarters: 1900 Kanawha Boulevard E, Charleston, West Virginia, U.S. 38.337875°N 81.614500°W
- Agency executive: Kent Leonhardt, West Virginia Commissioner of Agriculture
- Website: www.agriculture.wv.gov

The West Virginia Department of Agriculture is a government agency of the U.S. state of West Virginia.

== History ==
The Department of Agriculture was founded in 1891 as the West Virginia State Board of Agriculture. In 1911, the West Virginia Legislature created the modern department.

== Organization ==
The West Virginia Department of Agriculture is managed by the agriculture commissioner, an elected official operating independently of the governor's authority.

Kent Leonhardt has served as the commissioner of the department since January 2017.

== List of Commissioners ==
No.	Name	Took office	Left office	Party
1	Howard E. Williams	March 4, 1913	March 3, 1917	Republican
2	James H. Stewart	March 4, 1917	March 3, 1925	Republican
3	John W. Smith	March 4, 1925	January 10, 1931	Republican
4	Howard M. Gore	February 4, 1931	March 3, 1933	Republican
5	James B. McLaughlin	March 4, 1933	November 20, 1955	Democratic
6	John T. Johnson	December 14, 1955	1965	Democratic
7	Gus R. Douglass	1965	1989	Democratic
8	Cleve Benedict	1989	1993	Republican
9	Gus R. Douglass	1993	2013	Democratic
10	Walt Helmick	2013	2017	Democratic
11	Kent Leonhardt	2017	Incumbent	Republican
