= Kent Leonhardt =

American politician

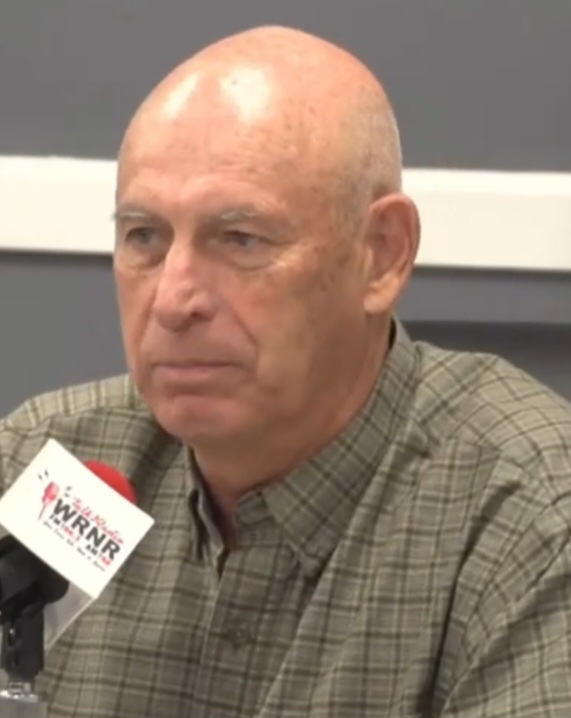

17th Agriculture Commissioner of West Virginia
- Incumbent
- Assumed office January 16, 2017
- Governor: Jim Justice; Patrick Morrisey
- Preceded by: Walt Helmick

Member of the West Virginia Senate from the 2nd district
- In office December 1, 2014 – January 16, 2017
- Preceded by: Larry J. Edgell
- Succeeded by: Charles H. Clements

Personal details
- Born: April 2, 1954 (age 72) New Jersey, U.S.
- Party: Republican
- Education: University of Missouri, Columbia (BA); Central Michigan University (MBA)

Kent Leonhardt (born April 2, 1954) is the West Virginia Commissioner of Agriculture. Having been elected in November 2016, he took office January 2017. He is a member of the United States Republican Party.

Leonhardt is a farmer operating a 380-acre (150 ha) farm in western Monongalia County, West Virginia. He raises sheep, cattle, and goats. He formerly served in the West Virginia State Senate for the 2nd district. He is retired from the United States Marine Corps as a lieutenant colonel. He holds a degree in wildlife management from the University of Missouri and an MBA from Central Michigan University.

== Electoral history ==
West Virginia Commissioner of Agriculture Election, 2012
Party	Candidate	Votes	%
Democratic	Walt Helmick	316,591	51.59
Republican	Kent Leonhardt	297,088	48.41

West Virginia Senate 2nd District Election, 2014
Party	Candidate	Votes	%
Republican	Kent Leonhardt	13,034	49.99
Democratic	Larry J. Edgell (inc.)	12,358	47.40
Constitution	Jeffrey Jarrell	681	2.61

West Virginia Commissioner of Agriculture Election, 2016
Party	Candidate	Votes	%
Republican	Kent Leonhardt	321,560	48.41
Democratic	Walt Helmick (inc.)	274,191	41.28
Libertarian	Buddy A. Guthrie	68,502	10.31

West Virginia Commissioner of Agriculture Election, 2020
Party	Candidate	Votes	%
Republican	Kent Leonhardt	480,386	64.98
Democratic	Robert Beach	258,912	35.02

West Virginia Commissioner of Agriculture Election, 2024
Party	Candidate	Votes	%
Republican	Kent Leonhardt	490,964	69.14
Democratic	Deborah Stiles	219,131	30.86

Party political offices
Preceded by J. Michael Teets	Republican nominee for Agriculture Commissioner of West Virginia; 2012, 2016, 2020, 2024	Most recent
Political offices
Preceded by Walt Helmick	Agriculture Commissioner of West Virginia; 2017–present	Incumbent
